= Never Kiss Your Best Friend: Lockdown Special =

Indian web series

- Genre: Romantic Drama
- Based on: Sumrit Shahi
- Written by: Sumrit Shahi
- Directed by: Arif Khan
- Starring: Nakuul Mehta; Anya Singh; Zain Imam; Jaaved Jaaferi
- Music by: Pranaay
- Original language: Hindi
- No. of seasons: 4
- No. of episodes: 10

Production
- Producers: Mohit Chhabra, Niraj Kothari
- Running time: 9-16 Minutes

Original release
- Network: ZEE5

Never Kiss Your Best Friend Lockdown Season was released on ZEE5 starring Nakuul Mehta, Anya Singh, Jaaved Jaaferi, Zain Imam and Niki Walia. It consists of 10 episodes each running approximately 9 to 16 Minutes. Lockdown season was written by Durjoy Datta and Sumrit Shahi, directed by Arif Khan and produced by Sarita A. Tanwar and Niraj Kothari.

== Plot ==
Two best friends find themselves locking lips, and it shouldn't. The lockdown special edition continues from where it left off. Tanie, who is still in a relationship with Sumer, is convinced that she made the worst mistake of her entire life by kissing her boyfriend Sumer. Love and friendship can't be mixed together.

== Cast ==
- Anya Singh as Tanie Brar
- Nakuul Mehta as Sumer Dhillion
- Jaaved Jaaferi as Bitttu Mama
- Zain Imam as Zayed: Anya's ex
- Nikki Walia as Happy Brar
- Rituraj Singh as Sumer's Father
