= Disha Parmar =

Indian actress and model (born 1994)

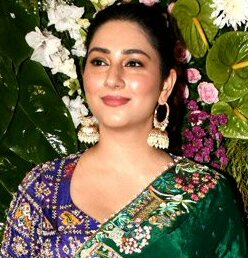
- Parmar in 2023
- Born: Disha Parmar; 11 November 1994 (age 31); New Delhi, India
- Occupations: Actress; model
- Years active: 2012–present
- Known for: Bade Achhe Lagte Hain 2; Pyaar Ka Dard Hai Meetha Meetha Pyaara Pyaara
- Spouse: Rahul Vaidya (m. 2021)
- Children: 1

Disha Parmar Vaidya (born 11 November 1994) is an Indian actress who works in Hindi television. She made her acting debut in 2012 and is known for her portrayal of Pankhuri Gupta in Pyaar Ka Dard Hai Meetha Meetha Pyaara Pyaara and Jhanvi Aggrawal in Woh Apna Sa. She earned wider recognition with her portrayal of Priya Sood in both Bade Achhe Lagte Hain 2. and Bade Achhe Lagte Hain 3.

== Early life and education ==
Parmar was born on 11 November 1994 in New Delhi in a Sahajdhari Sikh family. She completed her schooling from Sadhu Vaswani International School, Delhi. During her higher secondary education, she participated in dance competitions, plays and fashion shows.

Parmar appeared in several print and commercial advertisements in Delhi. She was pursuing a degree in business marketing but left her under-graduate studies midway as she was selected for Pyaar Ka Dard Hai Meetha Meetha Pyaara Pyaara.

== Personal life ==
Singer Rahul Vaidya proposed Parmar on her birthday, during his stint on Bigg Boss 14. Parmar married Vaidya on 16 July 2021 in Mumbai. The couple welcomed their first child, a daughter, Navya, in September 2023.

== Career ==
For a year, Parmar worked at the Delhi-based company Elite Model Management India Pvt. Ltd and organised the auditions for Rajshri Productions.

She enrolled for the auditions and was selected for the lead role of Pankhuri in Pyaar Ka Dard Hai Meetha Meetha Pyaara Pyaara. She was 17 at the time. She has received praise for her pairing with co-star Nakuul Mehta. She continued working in commercials along with the serial.

In 2016, Parmar featured in the web series I Don't Watch TV, released by Arré. In 2017, she played the lead role of Janvi / Jiya in Zee TV's daily soap Woh Apna Sa.

She featured in the music videos "Yaad Teri" and "Madhanya", both alongside Rahul Vaidya. Later she was seen in Box Cricket League as player in 2014. She was also a guest on Bigg Boss 14 to meet boyfriend, Rahul Vaidya, on Valentine's Day.

From 2021 to 2023, Parmar portrayed Priya in Ekta Kapoor's Bade Achhe Lagte Hain 2. She received positive reviews for her performance and her chemistry with Mehta is widely appreciated. Since October 2026, she was a contestant in Colors TV's Dhammal with Pati Patni Aur Panga – Jodiyon Ka Reality Check with her husband, Rahul Vaidya.

== Media image ==
Parmar is also one of the most-followed Indian television actresses on Instagram.

== Filmography ==
=== Television ===
Year	Title	Role	Notes	Ref.
2012–2014	Pyaar Ka Dard Hai Meetha Meetha Pyaara Pyaara	Pankhuri Gupta Kumar		
2014	Pyaar Ka Dard Hai Meetha Meetha Pyaara Pyaara	Ayesha Khan		
2017	Woh Apna Sa	Jhanvi Agarwal		
2017–2018	Woh Apna Sa	Jiya Mehra		
2021–2023	Bade Achhe Lagte Hain 2	Priya Sood Kapoor / Lovely Singh		
2023	Bade Achhe Lagte Hain 3	Dr. Priya Sood Kapoor		
2026–present	Dhammal with Pati Patni Aur Panga – Jodiyon Ka Reality Check	Contestant	Season 2	

==== Special appearances ====
Year	Title	Role	Ref.
2012	Saath Nibhaana Saathiya	Pankhuri	
2012	Ek Doosre Se Karte Hain Pyaar Hum	Pankhuri	
2012	Mann Kee Awaaz Pratigya	Pankhuri	
2012	Ek Hazaaron Mein Meri Behna Hai	Pankhuri	
2012	Iss Pyaar Ko Kya Naam Doon?	Pankhuri	
2013	Yeh Rishta Kya Kehlata Hai	Pankhuri	
2013	Saraswatichandra	Pankhuri	
2013	Diya Aur Baati Hum	Pankhuri	
2014	Yeh Hai Mohabbatein	Pankhuri	
2014	India's Raw Star	Herself	
2014–2015	Box Cricket League 1	Herself	
2015	Bigg Boss 9	Herself	
2017	Kumkum Bhagya	Jhanvi	
2017	Jamai Raja	Jhanvi	
2017	Aisi Deewangi Dekhi Nahi Kahi	Jhanvi	
2018	Kundali Bhagya	Jhanvi	
2018	Kaleerein	Jhanvi	
2021	Bigg Boss 14	Herself	
2021	Indian Idol 12	Priya	
2021	Kaun Banega Crorepati 13	Priya	

=== Web series ===
Year	Title	Role	Ref.
2016	I Don't Watch TV	Herself	

=== Music videos ===
Year	Title	Singer(s)	Ref.
2019	Yaad Teri	Rahul Vaidya	
2021	Madhanya	Asees Kaur and Rahul Vaidya	
2021	Matthe Te Chamkan	Aishwarya Bhandari and Rahul Vaidya	
2023	Prem Kahani	Rahul Vaidya	

== Awards and nominations ==
Year	Award	Category	Work	Result	Ref.
2013	Indian Telly Awards	Fresh New Face (Female)	Pyaar Ka Dard Hai Meetha Meetha Pyaara Pyaara	Won	
2013	BIG Star Entertainment Awards	Entertainer of the Year (Female)	Pyaar Ka Dard Hai Meetha Meetha Pyaara Pyaara	Won	
2014	Indian Telly Awards	Best Onscreen Couple (with Nakuul Mehta)	Pyaar Ka Dard Hai Meetha Meetha Pyaara Pyaara	Won	
2022	21st Indian Television Academy Awards	Popular Actress (Drama)	Bade Achhe Lagte Hain 2	Nominated	
2022	22nd Indian Television Academy Awards	Best Actress (Drama)	Bade Achhe Lagte Hain 2	Won	
2022	Gold Awards	Best Actress in a Lead Role	Bade Achhe Lagte Hain 2	Nominated	

== See also ==
- List of Hindi television actresses
- List of Indian television actresses
