= ITA Award for Best Actor Drama Jury =

Indian Television Academy award

- Awarded for: Best Performance by an Actor in a Leading Role on Television Jury
- Country: India
- Presented by: Indian Television Academy
- First award: 2001
- Final award: 2025
- Recent winner: Kanwar Dhillon

Highlights
- Total awarded: 25
- Most wins: Ram Kapoor (3)
- First winner: Kanwaljit Singh for Saans (2001)
- Latest winner: Kanwar Dhillon for Udne Ki Aasha (2025)

ITA Award for Best Actor Drama Jury is an award given by the Indian Television Academy jury as a part of its annual event.

== Superlatives ==
Ram Kapoor is 3-times winner of the award, which is the highest, followed by Nakuul Mehta, Mohnish Behl and Anil Kapoor who are 2-times winner of the same.

== Winners ==
=== 2000s ===
| Year | Photo | Actor | Character | Show | Ref |
|---|---|---|---|---|---|
| 2001 | | Kanwaljeet Singh | Gautam Kapoor | Saans | |
| 2002 | | Mohnish Behl | Shashank Gupta | Sanjivani | |
| 2003 | | Mohnish Behl | Shashank Gupta | Sanjivani | |
| 2004 | | Harsh Chhaya | Manas Awasthi | Astitva...Ek Prem Kahani | |
| 2005 | | Varun Badola | Abhimanyu Saxena | Astitva...Ek Prem Kahani | |
| 2006 | | Ram Kapoor | Jai Walia | Kasamh Se | |
| 2007 | | Darshan Dave | Sujeet | Ghar Ek Sapnaa | |
| 2008 | | Deven Bhojani | Gopal "Gattu" Thakkar | Baa Bahu Aur Baby | |
| 2009 | | Ronit Roy | Dharmraj Mahiyavanshi | Bandini | |

=== 2010s ===
| Year | Actor | Character | Show | Ref |
|---|---|---|---|---|
| 2010 | | Jay Soni | Ishaan Kashyap | Sasural Genda Phool |
| 2010 | | Ronit Roy | Dharamraj Mahyavanshi | Bandini |
| 2010 | | Sharad Kelkar | Digvijay Singh | Bairi Piya |
| 2010 | | Harshad Chopda | Anurag Ganguly | Tere Liye |
| 2010 | | Sushant Singh Rajput | Manav Deshmukh | Pavitra Rishta |
| 2011 | | Ram Kapoor | Ram Kapoor | Bade Achhe Lagte Hain |
| 2011 | | Ronit Roy | Dharamraj Mahyavanshi | Bandini |
| 2011 | | Sharad Kelkar | Digvijay Singh | Bairi Piya |
| 2011 | | Mohnish Bahl | Dr. Ashutosh Mathur | Kuch Toh Log Kahenge |
| 2011 | | Samir Soni | Kunal Chopra | Parichay |
| 2012 | | Ram Kapoor | Ram Kapoor | Bade Achhe Lagte Hain |
| 2012 | | Anas Rashid | Sooraj Rathi | Diya Aur Baati Hum |
| 2012 | | Manish Wadhwa | Chanakya | Chandragupta Maurya (2011) |
| 2012 | | Mohnish Bahl | Dr. Ashutosh Mathur | Kuch Toh Log Kahenge |
| 2012 | | Samir Soni | Kunal Chopra | Parichay |
| 2013 | | Anas Rashid | Sooraj Rathi | Diya Aur Baati Hum |
| 2013 | | Gautam Rode | Saraswatichandra | Saraswatichandra |
| 2013 | | Mohit Raina | Shiva | Devon Ke Dev...Mahadev |
| 2013 | | Ram Kapoor | Ram Kapoor | Bade Achhe Lagte Hain |
| 2013 | | Vivian Dsena | Rishabh Kundra | Madhubala – Ek Ishq Ek Junoon |
| 2014 | | Anil Kapoor | Jai Singh Rathore | 24 |
| 2014 | | Ashish Sharma | Rudra | Rangrasiya |
| 2014 | | Mohit Raina | Shiva | Devon Ke Dev...Mahadev |
| 2014 | | Vatsal Sheth | Shaurya Goenka | Ek Hasina Thi |
| 2014 | | Anas Rashid | Sooraj Rathi | Diya Aur Baati Hum |
| 2015 | | Karan Patel | Raman Bhalla | Yeh Hai Mohabbatein |
| 2016 | | Anil Kapoor | Jai Singh Rathore | 24 Season 2 |
| 2016 | | Ronit Roy | Advocate K.D. Pathak | Adalat 2 |
| 2016 | | Ashish Sharma | Ram | Siya Ke Ram |
| 2016 | | Sharad Malhotra | Rishi Singh Bedi | Kasam Tere Pyaar Ki |
| 2016 | | Vikram Singh Chauhan | Atharv Sujata | Jaana Na Dil Se Door |
| 2017 | | Purab Kohli | Sartaj Singh | P.O.W.- Bandi Yuddh Ke |
| 2017 | | Ashish Chaudhary | Dev Burman | Dev |
| 2017 | | Nakuul Mehta | Shivaay Singh Oberoi | Ishqbaaaz |
| 2017 | | Satyadeep Mishra | Imaan Khan | P.O.W. - Bandi Yuddh Ke |
| 2017 | | Manish Choudhary | Major Vikram Singh | P.O.W. - Bandi Yuddh Ke |
| 2018 | | Mohit Raina | Ishar Singh | 21 Sarfarosh - Saragarhi 1897 |
| 2018 | | Shaheer Sheikh | Dev Dixit | Kuch Rang Pyar Ke Aise Bhi |
| 2018 | | Nakuul Mehta | Shivaay Singh Oberoi | Ishqbaaaz |
| 2018 | | Mohit Malik | Sikandar Gill | Kullfi Kumarr Bajewala |
| 2018 | | Karan Jotwani | Sahil | Aap Ke Aa Jane Se |
| 2019 | | Mudit Nayar | Yogi | Ishaaron Ishaaron Mein |
| 2019 | | Avinesh Rekhi | Sarabjit Singh Gill | Choti Sarrdaarni |
| 2019 | | Upendra Limaye | Sachin Mane | Tara From Satara |
| 2019 | | Shabir Ahluwalia | Abhishek Mehra | Kumkum Bhagya |

=== 2020s ===
| Year | Photo | Actor | Character | Show | Ref |
|---|---|---|---|---|---|
| 2020 | Not Awarded | | | | |
| 2021 | | Sudhanshu Pandey | Vanraj Shah | Anupamaa | |
| 2022 | | Nakuul Mehta | Ram Kapoor | Bade Achhe Lagte Hain 2 | |
| 2022 | | Sudhanshu Pandey | Vanraj Shah | Anupamaa | |
| 2022 | | Cezanne Khan | Nikhil Jaisingh | Appnapan – Badalte Rishton Ka Bandhan | |
| 2022 | | Neil Bhatt | Virat Chavan | Ghum Hai Kisikey Pyaar Meiin | |
| 2022 | | Fahmaan Khan | Aryan Singh Rathore | Imlie | |
| 2023 | | Nakuul Mehta | Ram Kapoor | Bade Achhe Lagte Hain 3 | |
| 2023 | | Harshad Chopda | Abhimanyu Birla | Yeh Rishta Kya Kehlata Hai | |
| 2023 | | Adnan Khan | Viaan Raghuvanshi | Katha Ankahee | |
| 2023 | | Ram Yashvardhan | Shiva | Shiv Shakti – Tap Tyaag Tandav | |
| 2023 | | Shakti Anand | Karan Luthra | Kundali Bhagya | |
| 2024 | | Amar Upadhyay | Ganga "Agni" Thakur | Doree | |
| 2024 | | Kanwar Dhillon | Sachin Deshmukh | Udne Ki Aasha | |
| 2024 | | Rohit Purohit | Armaan Poddar | Yeh Rishta Kya Kehlata Hai | |
| 2024 | | Aanjjan Srivastav | Srinivas Wagle | Wagle Ki Duniya – Nayi Peedhi Naye Kissey | |
| 2024 | | Jayesh More | Dilip Patel | Pushpa Impossible | |
| 2025 | | Kanwar Dhillon | Sachin Deshmukh | Udne Ki Aasha | |
| 2025 | | Arjit Taneja | Virat Singh Ahuja | Kaise Mujhe Tum Mil Gaye | |
| 2025 | | Rohit Purohit | Armaan Poddar | Yeh Rishta Kya Kehlata Hai | |
| 2025 | | Rajat Verma | Virat Verma | Itti Si Khushi | |
| 2025 | | Sumeet Raghavan | Rajesh Wagle | Wagle Ki Duniya | |

== See also ==
- ITA Award for Best Actress Drama Jury
- ITA Award for Best Actor Drama Popular
- ITA Award for Best Actress Drama Popular
