= Karan Wahi =

Indian actor (born 1986)

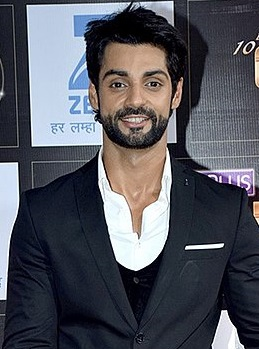
- Wahi in 2017
- Born: 9 June 1986 (age 40); New Delhi, India
- Education: University of Delhi
- Occupations: Actor; model; anchor
- Years active: 2004–present

Karan Wahi (born 9 June 1986) is an Indian actor, model and television host. He is known for his roles in Star One's teen drama Remix and romance drama Dill Mill Gayye. He is also known for his participation in several reality shows Jhalak Dikhhla Jaa 5, Khatron Ke Khiladi 8 , Khatron Ke Khiladi Made In India and Khatron Ke Khiladi 15 also hosted Nach Baliye, Indian Idol and India's Next Superstars. He made his Bollywood debut with Daawat-e-Ishq and Hate Story 4.

== Early life ==
Wahi was born on 9 June 1986 in Delhi to a Punjabi father and a Kashmiri mother. He did his schooling from St. Mark's Senior Secondary Public School and completed his higher education at the IILM Institute. In 2003, Wahi made it to the top 20 for selection to play for the Delhi Under-19 cricket team.

== Career ==
=== Early roles and breakthrough (2004–2013) ===
Wahi started his acting career with the 2004 "Rose Audio Visuals" television series Remix, where he portrayed the lead role of Ranveer Sisodia, the angry lover boy character, opposite Shweta Gulati. The story of the show was based on the lives of 12th-grade students in an elite school for the kids of the rich and the famous, and scholarship students from poorer families. His performance in the show won him the Indian Telly Award for GR8 Best Male Newcomer. In March 2008, Wahi was a contestant in the celebrity talent hunt show Mr. & Ms. TV judged by filmmaker Madhur Bhandarkar and actress Sonali Bendre.

After a break from fiction shows, Wahi made a comeback in the 2009 Colors TV's soap opera Mere Ghar Aayi Ek Nanhi Pari as the male lead opposite Mugdha Chaphekar. By the following year, he starred played Dr. Siddhant Modi in Cinevistaas Limited productions' medical drama series Dill Mill Gayye opposite Jennifer Winget.

Wahi was also seen playing the supporting role of a fun-loving guy, Rohan in mid-December 2011 on Sony Entertainment Television's romance-drama series Kuch Toh Log Kahenge. The show was the Indian adaption of the Pakistani television drama series Dhoop Kinare. In September 2011, he appeared in the travel reality show Ritz Jee Le Ye Pal, which he won. In July 2012, he was one of the hosts of the red carpet segment for the 5th Zee Gold Awards. He was cast alongside Kritika Kamra and Mohnish Behl in Kuch Toh Log Kahenge. In 2012, Wahi was paired with Chhavi Pandey to play the lead in Shontara Productions' anthology series Teri Meri Love Stories.

During the Pakistani cricket team tour of in India in 2012–13, Wahi worked as a live cricket based show host for Star Sports Hindi.

Wahi entered as a wild card in the fifth season of BBC Productions' celebrity dance reality show Jhalak Dikhhla Jaa, but was eliminated next month. He was the co-host of two seasons of the dance reality show Nach Baliye along with Gautam Rode He also hosted the additional series of the same show, Sriman vs Srimati along with Aishwarya Sakhuja.

=== Work as host and web expansion (2014–present) ===
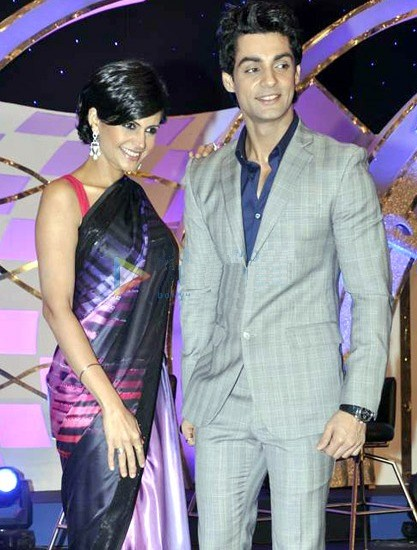
Wahi and Mandira Bedi at a press conference for Indian Idol Junior

Wahi signed his first movie with Habib Faisal's romantic comedy film Daawat-e-Ishq in 2014. He was seen in a supporting role of a Hyderabadi boy, Amjad alongside Parineeti Chopra and Aditya Roy Kapur.

Wahi also signed to play the male lead opposite Rhea Chakraborty in the 2014 romantic drama film Babbu Ki Jawani, produced by Amritpal Singh Bindra, under the UTV Spotboy productions. In September 2015, Wahi was seen as a comedian contestant alongside Bharti Singh in Colors TV's comedy show Comedy Nights Bachao. In 2016, Wahi played the lead character in &TV's Kahani Hamari...Dil Dosti Deewanepan Ki.

Wahi has been the host of various red carpet events and awards shows including the Indian Telly Awards and Star Guild Awards.

Along with Mandira Bedi, he was next seen co-hosting the singing reality show Indian Idol Junior. In 2015, he replaced Jay Bhanushali for the second season as the host of Dance India Dance Super Moms.

Wahi was seen in two episodes of Colors Television's popular comedy talk show Comedy Nights with Kapil. He was also a part of the winning team of the first season of the reality show Box Cricket League. In March 2015, he participated in the reality game show India Poochega Sabse Shaana Kaun?, hosted by actor Shah Rukh Khan. He also participated Fear Factor: Khatron Ke Khiladi in 2017. He ended up at 8th place. In August 2020, he participated 2nd time in Colors TV's stunt-based reality show Khatron Ke Khiladi - Made In India where he finished at 1st runner-up.

After a gap of 6 years, Wahi made a comeback to television, in July 2022 with Star Bharat's show Channa Mereya as Aditya Raj Singh, opposite Niyati Fatnani. In the same year, he played Karan Malhotra in the second season of Never Kiss Your Best Friend opposite Anya Singh. A critic of Gulf News noted, "Karan is steadfast in his histrionics as a brilliant actor insecure in love."

From 2023 to 2024, he appeared as Jogi opposite Maanvi Gagroo, in the series Half Love Half Arranged. Reviewing the second season, Bhawna Arya stated, "Karan as Jogi, brings a unique vibe to his role; however, the writing holds his character back."

== Other work and media image ==
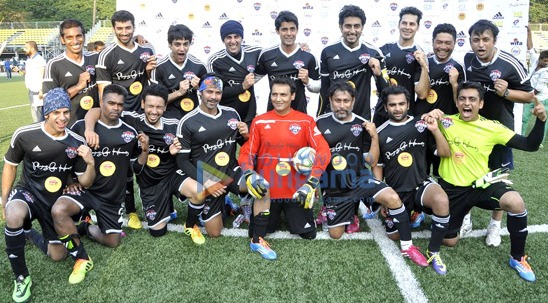
Wahi at All Stars Football charity match

In addition to acting, Wahi has also supported various charitable organisations. In 2012, he joined the All Stars Football Club, a celebrity football club that raises fund for India's largest non-profit organisations. He has also participated in the Gold Charity Soccer matches to raise funds for supporting the junior artists of the industry. In August 2014, he took part in the Ice Bucket Challenge to spread awareness for amyotrophic lateral sclerosis (ALS).

Wahi began his career as a cricketer, representing St. Mark's Senior Secondary Public School during his school days. In 2003, he was selected for the Under-19 cricket team for Delhi alongside Virat Kohli and Shikhar Dhawan. Owing to a major injury, Wahi had to leave the sport and enrolled in a marketing course to join his father's business.

In 2013, Wahi featured at number 46 in the UK newspaper Eastern Eye's "Sexiest Asian Man on the Planet" list. He was also ranked 9th in Times of India's Top 20 Most Desirable Men on Indian Television 2018, 13th in 2019, and 15th in 2020.

== Filmography ==
=== Films ===
Year	Title	Role	Notes	Ref.
2014	Daawat-e-Ishq	Amjad Baig		
2017	Have You Met You	Karan	Short film	
2018	Hate Story 4	Rajveer Khurana		
2025	Aap Jaisa Koi	Namit Agarwal	Netflix film	

=== Television ===
Year	Title	Role	Notes	Ref.
2004–2006	Remix	Ranveer Sisodia		
2007	Kasamh Se	Pradeep		
2008	Mr. & Ms. TV	Contestant	1st runner-up	
2008	Kaun Jeetega Bollywood Ka Ticket	Contestant		
2009	Mere Ghar Aayi Ek Nanhi Pari	Rajveer		
2009–2010	Dill Mill Gayye	Dr. Siddhant "Sid" Modi		
2010	Shraddha	Rohit Khurana		
2010–2011	Baat Hamari Pakki Hai	Ranbeer		
2011	Zor Ka Jhatka: Total Wipeout	Contestant		
2011	Jeele Yeh Pal	Contestant	Winner	
2012	Kuch Toh Log Kahenge	Rohan Solanki		
2012	Teri Meri Love Stories	Ritesh		
2012	Jhalak Dikhhla Jaa 5	Contestant	6th place	
2012	Nach Baliye 5	Host		
2013	Indian Idol Junior	Host		
2013	Nach Baliye 6	Host		
2014–2015	Box Cricket League 1	Contestant		
2015	Farah Ki Dawat	Contestant		
2015	Dance India Dance Super Moms	Host		
2015–2017	Comedy Nights Bachao	Comedian		
2016	Box Cricket League 2	Contestant		
2016	Box Cricket League Punjab	Contestant		
2016	Kahani Hamari... Dil Dosti Deewanepan Ki	Shivin Raichand		
2016	Indian Idol 7	Host		
2017	Fear Factor: Khatron Ke Khiladi 8	Contestant	8th place	
2018	Box Cricket League 3	Contestant		
2018	India's Next Superstars	Host		
2018	India Ke Mast Kalandar	Host		
2019	Kitchen Champion 5	Host		
2019	The Voice	Host		
2019	Dance India Dance 7	Host		
2019	Box Cricket League 4	Contestant		
2020	Fear Factor: Khatron Ke Khiladi – Made in India	Contestant	1st runner-up	
2020	Ladies vs Gentlemen	Panelist		
2021	Indian Pro Music League	Host		
2022	Channa Mereya	Aditya Raj Singh		
2026	Khatron Ke Khiladi 15	Contestant	5th place	

==== Special appearances ====
Year	Name	Role	Ref.
2005	The Great Indian Laughter Challenge	Ranveer Sisodia	
2006	Kyaa Hoga Nimmo Kaa	Ranveer Sisodia	
2014	Comedy Nights with Kapil	Himself	
2015	India Poochega Sabse Shaana Kaun?	Himself	
2015	Nach Baliye 7	Himself	
2015	Jhalak Dikhhla Jaa 8	Himself	
2015	Comedy Classes	Himself	
2016	Ek Tha Raja Ek Thi Rani	Himself	
2016	Bigg Boss 10	Himself	
2017	Entertainment Ki Raat	Himself	
2019	Bigg Boss 13	Himself	
2020	Fear Factor: Khatron Ke Khiladi 10	Himself	
2021	Bigg Boss OTT 1	Himself	
2021	Dance Deewane 3	Himself	
2022	Kumkum Bhagya	Himself	
2022	Swayamvar – Mika Di Vohti	Aditya Raj Singh	
2026	Laughter Chefs – Unlimited Entertainment season 3	Himself	

=== Web series ===
Year	Name	Role	Notes	Ref.
2016	I Don't Watch TV	Himself		
2018	Sacred Games	Karan Malhotra		
2018	Bar Code	Vicky Arora		
2020	Hundred	Manohar "Maddy" Dahiya		
2020	Home Dancer	Host		
2022	Never Kiss Your Best Friend 2	Karan Malhotra		
2023–2024	Half Love Half Arranged	Jogi	2 seasons	
2024	Raisinghani VS Raisinghani	Virat Choudhary		
2025	Couple Goals 5 †	TBA	Completed	

=== Music video appearances ===
Year	Title	Singer(s)	Ref.
2019	"Akhbaar"	Arko Pravo Mukherjee	
2019	"Jutti"	Lil Golu, Seepi Jha	
2022	"Tera Saath Ho"	Zahrah S Khan, Guru Randhawa	
2023	"Mere Ho Jao"	Rahat Fateh Ali Khan	

== Awards and nominations ==
Year	Award	Category	Show	Result
2005	Indian Telly Awards	GR8! Best Newcomer (Male)	Remix	Won
2013	Gold Awards	Most Fit Actor (Male)	—N/a	Won
2014	Indian Telly Awards	Favourite Host	Nach Baliye 6	Won
2014	Indian Television Academy Awards	Best Anchor	Nach Baliye 6	Won
2018	Gold Awards	Most Fit Actor (Male)	—N/a	Nominated
2019	Gold Awards	Most Fit Actor (Male)	—N/a	Won
2022	Indian Television Academy Awards	Best OTT Actor	Never Kiss Your Best Friend 2	Won
