= Never Kiss Your Best Friend season 1 =

Indian web series

Never Kiss Your Best Friend
- Season 1
- Starring: Nakuul Mehta; Anya Singh; Nikki Walla; Rituraj Singh
- No. of episodes: 18

Release
- Original release: January 2020

Season chronology
- Next → Season 2

The first season Indian television series was premiered on ZEE5 in January 2020 starring Nakuul Mehta, Anya Singh, Suchitra Krishnamoorthi, Niki Aneja, Rituraj Singh, and Vivek Mushran. The season was directed by Arif Khan, written by Durjoy Datta and Sumrit Shahi and produced by 11:11 Productions. Never Kiss Your Best Friend was shot in London.

== Cast ==
- Anya Singh as Tanie Brar
- Nakuul Mehta as Sumer Dhillion
- Nikki Walia as Happy Brar
- Nikkita Chadha as Manali
- Rituraj Singh as Sumer's Father

== Reception ==
Heer Kothari from The Free Press Journal gave four star stating " A refreshing web series". Shubham Kulkarni from Koimoi wrote " Nakuul Mehta & Anya Singh Starrer Is A Staple Drama With An Ae Dil Hai Mushkil Hangover To It". Ruchita Mishra from Peeping wrote " Kya pyaar dosti hai?' Nakuul Mehta’s and Anya Singh's friendly rom-com is totally relatable". Arushi Jain from Indian Express wrote" An easy-breezy show on love and friendship".
