= Never Kiss Your Best Friend season 2 =

Never Kiss Your Best Friend
- Season 2
- Starring: Nakuul Mehta; Anya Singh; Karan Wahi; Jaaved Jaaferi
- No. of episodes: 8

Release
- Original network: ZEE5

Season chronology
- ← Previous; Season 1

Never Kiss Your Best Friend Season 2 is Indian web-series on ZEE5 starring Nakuul Mehta, Anya Singh, Karan Wahi, Jaaved Jaaferi, Nikki Walia and Sarah-Jane Dias. This series is based on Sumrit Shahi's book with the same name. Never Kiss Your Best Friend is directed by Harsh Dedhia, produced by 11:11 Productions.

== Plot ==
"This is the returning season of Never Kiss Your Best Friend where the story revolves around two best friends, Tanie and Sumer played by Anya Singh and Nakuul Mehta respectively. Tanie Brar has been through a series of highs and lows over the past two years, and not just because of the pandemic. Tanie was soaring with the success of her first book, when she broke up with her best friend turned boyfriend, Sumer. The two of them reunite incidentally after years of separation and are immediately at loggerheads with each other. Neither of them have been in contact in nearly two years."

== Cast ==
- Anya Singh as Tanie Brar
- Nakuul Mehta as Sumer Dhillion
- Sarah Jane Dias as Lavanyaa Oberoi
- Karan Wahi as Karan Malhotra
- Sapna Pabbi as Alisha
- Jaaved Jaaferi as Bittu Mama
- Nikki Walia as Happy Brar
- Deepti Bhatnagar as Sangeeta Malhotra
- Nikkita Chadha as Manali
- Vicky Modi as Gautam
- Karanuday Jenjani as Rajeev Oberoi
- Navaldeep Singh as Tittu
- Rituraj Singh as Sumer's Father
- Saddhika Syal as Myra

== Reception ==
Archika Khurrana from Times of India gave three and half star starting " A BINGE-WORTHY SEQUEL TO A MILLENNIAL ROM-COM". Shubham Kulkarni from Koimoi wrote" Nakuul Mehta & Anya Singh Suddenly Find A Soul Mid-Way Making This The Better Season." Priyakshi Sharma from PinkVilla wrote " Nakuul Mehta & Anya Singh are delightful as lovers-turned-foes." Manisha Lakhe from Money Control wrote "A refreshing story about love and friendship".
