= Gold Award for Debut in a Lead Role (Male) =

Annual Indian television awards

Gold Award for Best Debut in a Lead Role (Male)
- Awarded for: Best Performance by a Debut Male Actor in a Lead Role on Television
- Country: India
- Presented by: White Leaf Entertainment
- First award: 2007 (for performances in TV shows in 2006)
- Currently held by: Sumedh Mudgalkar for RadhaKrishn (Popular)
- Website: Gold Awards

Gold Award for Best Debut Actor in a Lead Role - Male is an award given as part of its annual Gold Awards for TV serials, to recognize a debut actor who has delivered an outstanding performance in a leading role.

== List of winners ==
=== 2000s ===
- 2007 Sharad Malhotra - Banoo Main Teri Dulhann as Sagar Singh
  - Jay Bhanushali - Kayamath as Neev Shergill
  - Ajay Singh Chaudhary - Love Story as Dev
  - Romit Raj - Ghar Ki Lakshmi Betiyaan as Yuvraj Garodia
- 2008 Kinshuk Mahajan - Sapna Babul Ka...Bidaai as Ranveer
  - Angad Hasija - Sapna Babul Ka...Bidaai as Alekh
  - Karan Hukku - Kasamh Se as Daksh
  - Saurabh Pandey - Jiya Jale as Chandan
  - Harshad Chopda - Kis Desh Mein Hai Meraa Dil as Prem Juneja
  - Vikrant Massey - Dharamveer as Dharam
- 2009 Not Awarded

=== 2010s ===
- 2010 Nandish Sandhu - Uttaran as Veer Singh Bundela
    - Kavi Shastri - Rishta.Com as Rohan Mehra
  - Shashank Vyas - Balika Vadhu as Jagdish
  - Rahul Bagga - Powder as Mahindra Ranade
  - Abhishek Tiwari - Chand Chupa Badal Mein as Siddharth Sood
  - Mohit Malhotra - Mitwa Phool Kamal Ke as Birju
- 2011 Arhaan Behl - Mann Kee Awaaz Pratigya as Krishna Sajjan Singh
- 2012 Kushal Tandon - Ek Hazaaron Mein Meri Behna Hai as Virat Singh Vadhera
  - Rithvik Dhanjani - Pavitra Rishta as Arjun Digvijay Kirloskar
  - Gaurav S Bajaj - Sapnon Se Bhare Naina as Daksh Patwardhan
  - Ashish Kapoor - Dekha Ek Khwab as Yuvraj Rajkumar Udayveer Singh
  - Sumit Vats - Hitler Didi as Rishi
  - Sujay Reu - Ram Milaye Jodi as Anukalp Gandhi
- 2013 Nakuul Mehta - Pyaar Ka Dard Hai Meetha Meetha Pyaara Pyaara as Aditya Harish Kumar (Adi)
  - Kunwar Amar - Dil Dosti Dance as Reyansh Singhania (Rey)
  - Mudit Nayar - Anamika as Jeet Pratap Saluja (Anamika)
  - Shaleen Malhotra - Har Yug Mein Ayega Ek -Arjun as Arjun Suryakant Raute
  - Nishad Vaidya - Amita Ka Amit as Amit Shah
- 2014 Harshad Arora - Beintehaa as Zain Osman Abdullah
  - Mishkat Varma - Aur Pyaar Ho Gaya as Raj Purohit
  - Shivin Narang - Ek Veer Ki Ardaas...Veera as Ranvijay Sampooran Singh
  - Vishal Vashishta - Ek Veer Ki Ardaas...Veera as Baldev Balwant Singh
  - Himanshu Soni - Buddha as Buddha
- 2015 Siddharth Nigam - Chakravartin Ashoka Samrat as Ashoka
- 2016 Rohan Mehra - Yeh Rishta Kya Kehlata Hai as Naksh Singhania
- 2017 Mohsin Khan - Yeh Rishta Kya Kehlata Hai as Karthik Goenka
- 2018 Ritvik Arora - Tu Aashiqui as Ahaan Dhanrajgir
- 2019 Sumedh Mudgalkar - RadhaKrishn as Krishna
