= Bade Achhe Lagte Hain 2 =

2021–23 Indian television soap opera

- Genre: Romance; Drama
- Created by: Ekta Kapoor, Shobha Kapoor
- Based on: Bade Achhe Lagte Hain
- Written by: Deepika Bajpai; Kabeer Deewan
- Directed by: Shahir Raza; Deepak Vithoba Chavan; Abhishek Kumar R Pal
- Starring: Nakuul Mehta; Disha Parmar; Niti Taylor; Randeep Rai
- Theme music composer: Composer; R. D. Burman; Music by Lalit Sen; Nawab Arzoo
- Opening theme: "Bade Achhe Lagte Hain" by Shreya Ghoshal
- Composers: Abhishek Singh; Mintu Jha
- Country of origin: India
- Original language: Hindi
- No. of episodes: 453

Production
- Producers: Ekta Kapoor; Shobha Kapoor
- Camera setup: Multi camera
- Running time: 21–23 minutes
- Production company: Balaji Telefilms
- Budget: 1812 crore

Original release
- Network: Sony Entertainment Television
- Release: 30 August 2021 – 24 May 2023

Related
- Bade Achhe Lagte Hain; Bade Achhe Lagte Hain 3 Bade Achhe Lagte Hain 4

Bade Achhe Lagte Hain 2 is an Indian Hindi-language television romantic drama series that ran from 30 August 2021 to 24 May 2023 on Sony Entertainment Television. It is digitally available on Sony LIV. Produced by Ekta Kapoor under Balaji Telefilms, it is a spiritual sequel or reboot version of the 2011 series of the same name. It starred Nakuul Mehta, Disha Parmar, Randeep Rai and Niti Taylor.

== Plot ==
Priya Sood lives with her mother, sisters Sara, Maitri and Sandy and cousin Akshay. Her father Mahendra, left them, now living with his second wife and son. Established business tycoon, Ram Kapoor was deserted by his girlfriend Vedika and now entirely focuses on work and family, which includes his stepmother Nandini and half-siblings Shubham and Shivina. Nandini just uses Ram for his money.

Shivina and Akshay are having an affair, but Akshay refuses to marry before Priya, thus Ram marries her, much to Nandini's displeasure. Vedika, hoping to get Ram back, reveals their past affair to Priya. Ram and Priya, however, stand united. Nandini, Shubham, Vedika tries many tricks and once took help of Neeraj (Priya's toxic ex) and Mahendra but still Ram and Priya's love and trust for each other increases. Shashi wants Ram's money, but his fraud is exposed. Shashi and Mahendra tries to kill Ram as Mahendra wants to avenge his insult and Shashi wants money. Priya saves Ram by almost dying. Hence finally both Ram and Priya realises their love for each other. Ram decides to reopen the investigation of his father's murder. Sara's husband Varun, Mahendra and Shashi are implicated with this murder and are incarcerated. However Shashi flees away. Shivina dies when Eshan accidentally pushes her in the staircase. Priya takes the blame and goes to prison. She discovers being pregnant with Ram's child but is manipulated by Nandini, in keeping the child away.

=== 5 years later ===
Priya serves her sentence and is blessed with a girl who she names Pihu. Nandini pretends to be depressed and ill and pretends to take medicines in front of Ram and both Nandini and Shubham uses Shivina's death to keep him under control. Both Ram and Pihu, learn about being father-daughter. Ram ends up knowing the truth behind Shivina's death and finally reunites with Pihu and Priya. Vedika emotionally blackmails Pihu to not reveal the truth but eventually Vedika, Shubham and Nandini are exposed in front of Ram who subsequently ousts Vedika. Priya gets pregnant for the second time.

Shubham and Sid crack a deal with Yash Khanna with Ram's help, which unknowingly sets Ram to cross paths with his much-alive mother Swati and brother Lakhan. Lakhan loves Avni, Yash Khanna's daughter, who in turn wants her to marry Sid. Ram and Lakhan are at loggerheads, when the truth of them being brothers comes out. In a bid to destroy Ram, Siddharth plan to kill Priya and provokes Shubham to agree with him. Nandini, Priya and Ram have a final showdown at Sood House. Ram and Priya learn the reality behind Swati's desertion and soon the Sood House is set on fire. Nandini seeing Ram and Priya still caring for her life, realises her mistake and in-turn saves them but dies. Shubham is devastated by Nandini's death and turns abnormal. Siddharth sends him somewhere and after that it's not clear what happened to him. Priya delivers Prachi. Both Ram and Priya pass away, hugging each other.

=== 20 years later ===
Lakhan has now taken over Ram's business. His relationship with Pihu and Prachi is not so good, but he believes that he has a responsibility to take care of the kids. Avni is married to Sid amidst the leap.

Pihu gets attracted to Raghav, Lakhan's secretary, who instead harbours feelings for Prachi. Brinda and Aditya's adoptive son, Angad, has feelings for Pihu. Prachi learns that Pihu loves someone but Pihu doesn't reveal it. But when she is confronted by Angad who confesses his true feelings for her, but learns that she doesn't love him but Raghav.

Avni and Sid's son, Josh, plans on taking over the Kapoors' wealth by winning over Prachi. On the other hand, Lakhan asks Raghav to make Prachi fall in love with Josh, and eventually, Prachi starts liking Josh who manipulates her in getting an entry in Kapoors' business. Josh learns that Raghav loves Prachi, so he frames Raghav to create differences between him and Prachi. Josh also manipulates Lakhan into removing Raghav from Kapoor Mansion. Pihu and Angad, however, side with Raghav and leave Kapoor mansion.

=== 3 years later ===
Prachi's relationship with Lakhan and Monica is mended and they have accepted both the Kapoor sisters as their daughters. Raghav, Pihu and Angad return and plan on saving Prachi's life and kicking out Josh from her life. They are also helped by Lakhan, Monica, Adi, Brinda, Sara and Vikrant. They all try to make Prachi realize about Josh's true colors.

Josh and Prachi get engaged but when he suspects her of having an affair with Raghav and does not trust her, she breaks off their relation and refuses to marry him. Prachi meets with an accident and while in hospital, she over-hears Pihu and Angad, where she learns that the person Pihu loved was Raghav. Prachi realizes her feelings for Raghav but decides to sacrifice for Pihu and proposes Josh again to marry.

Raghav finds out about Sid's hand behind Ram and Priya's murder and is helped by Avni in exposing him. Pihu confesses her love for Angad. Prachi breaks off her alliance with Josh and proposes Raghav to marry her. The story ends with Raghav and Prachi getting married and everyone posing for a family picture.

== Cast ==
=== Main ===
- Nakuul Mehta as Ram "RK" Kapoor: Swati and Virendra's elder son; Nandini's step-son; Lakhan's brother; Shubham and Shivina's half-brother; Priya's husband; Pihu and Prachi's father (2021–2023)
- Disha Parmar as Priya Sood: Meer and Mahendra's daughter; Sarangi, Maitri and Sandhya's sister; Raj's half-sister; Ram's wife; Pihu and Prachi's mother (2021–2023)
- Niti Taylor as Prachi Kapoor: Priya and Ram's daughter; Pihu's sister; Raghav's wife (2023)
- Randeep Rai as Raghav Arora: Kapil's brother; Pihu and Angad's childhood best friend; Prachi's husband (2023)
- Pooja Banerjee as Pihu Kapoor: Priya and Ram's daughter; Prachi's sister; Raghav's childhood best friend; Mahir's ex-fiancee; Angad's love-interest (2023)
  - Aarohi M.Kumawat as Child Pihu Sood Kapoor (2022–2023)
- Leenesh Mattoo as Angad Shekhawat: Brinda and Aditya's adopted son; Raghav's childhood best friend; Pihu's love-interest (2023)

=== Recurring ===
==== Kapoors ====
- Shubhaavi Choksey as Nandini Kapoor (nee: Garewal) – Sanjeev's sister; Virendra's second wife; Shubham and Shivina's mother; Monica's aunt; Ram and Lakhan's step-mother; Pihu and Prachi's step-grandmother (2021–2023) (Dead) (Former antagonist)
- Manraj Singh as Shubham "Shubhu" Kapoor – Virendra and Nandini's son; Shivina's brother; Ram and Lakhan's half-brother; Monica's cousin (2021–2023) (Former antagonist)
- Sneha Namanandi as Shivina "Shivi" Kapoor Mehra – Virendra and Nandini's daughter; Shubham's sister; Ram and Lakhan's half-sister; Monica's cousin; Akshay's wife (2021–2022) (Dead)
- Shalini Arora as Swati Kapoor – Virendra's first wife; Ram and Lakhan's mother; Pihu and Prachi's grandmother (2022–2023)
- Hiten Tejwani as Lakhan "LK" Kapoor – Virendra and Swati's younger son; Nandini's step-son; Ram's brother; Shubham and Shivina's half-brother; Monica's husband; Pihu and Prachi's uncle/father figure (2022–2023)
- Shraddha Jaiswal / Tuhina Vohra as Monica Kapoor (nee: Garewal) – Sanjeev and Mitali's daughter; Nandini's niece; Shubham and Shivina's cousin; Lakhan's wife; Mahir, Pihu and Prachi's aunt and mother-figure (2023)

==== Soods ====
- Abhay Bhargava as Mahendra Sood – Meera's ex-husband; Rakhi's husband; Sarangi, Priya, Maitri, Sandhya and Raj's father; Eshan, Pihu and Prachi's grandfather (2021–2022) (Main antagonist)
- Maanya Singh as Sandhya "Sandy" Sood – Mahendra and Meera's youngest daughter; Sara, Priya and Maitri's sister; Raj's half-sister; Akshay's cousin (2021–2022)
- Ankit Shah as Raj "Bunty" Sood – Mahendra and Rakhi's son; Meera's stepson; Sarangi, Priya, Maitri and Sandhya's half-brother (2021–2022) (Antagonist)
- Geetu Bawa as Rakhi Sood – Mahendra's second wife; Raj's mother; Sarangi, Priya, Maitri and Sandhya's step-mother (2021–2022) (Antagonist)

==== Aroras ====
- Alefia Kapadia as Sarangi "Sara" Arora (nee: Sood) – Mahendra and Meera's eldest daughter; Priya, Maitri and Sandhya's sister; Raj's half-sister; Akshay's cousin; Varun's ex-wife; Vikrant's wife; Ishaan's mother (2021–2023)
- Abhinav Kapoor as Vikrant "Vicky" Arora – Ram and Priya's friend; Twinkle's ex-husband, Sarangi's husband; Ishaan's step-father (2021–2023)
- Krushag Ghuge as Ishaan Arora – Sarangi's son; Vikrant's step-son; Pihu and Prachi's cousin (2022)
  - Meet Mukhi as Teenage Ishaan (2022)
- Ajay Dutta as Mr. Arora – Vikrant's father (2022)

==== Shekawats ====
- Ajay Nagrath as Aditya "Adi" Shekhawat – Ram and Priya's friend; Brinda's husband; Angad's adoptive father (2021–2023)
- Aanchal Khurana as Brinda "Bri" Shekhawat – Ram and Priya's friend; Aditya's wife; Angad's adoptive mother (2021–2023)
- Kanupriya Pandit as Meera Mehra – Dhirendra's sister; Mahendra's ex-wife; Sarangi, Priya, Maitri and Sandhya's mother; Raj's step-mother; Ishaan, Pihu and Prachi's grandmother (2021–2023)

==== Babbar ====
- Vineet Kumar Chaudhary as Shashwat "Shashi" Babbar – Sahil's elder son, Siddharth's brother; Vedika's former husband (2021–2022) (Main antagonist)
- Jitendra Nokewal as Siddharth "Sid" Babbar – Sahil's younger son; Shashwat's brother; Avni's husband; Josh and Kiara's father (2021–2023) (Initially antagonist then main antagonist)
- Ritu Chauhan as Avni Babbar (nee: Khanna) – Yash and Veena's daughter; Siddharth's wife; Josh and Kiara's mother (2022–2023)
- Devashish Chandiramani as Josh Babbar – Siddharth and Avni's son; Kiara's brother; Prachi's ex-fiance (2023) (Antagonist)
- Anurima Chakraborty / Sakshi Parihar as Kiara Babbar – Siddharth and Avni's daughter; Josh's sister; Kapil's girlfriend (2023)

==== Bahl ====
- Anjum Fakih as Maitri Bahl (nee: Sood) – Mahendra and Meera's third daughter; Sarangi, Priya and Sandhya's sister; Raj's half-sister; Akshay's cousin; Neeraj's wife (2021–2022)
- Aman Maheshwari as Neeraj Bahl – Priya's ex-boyfriend; Maitri's husband (2021–2022) (Antagonist)

==== Garewals ====
- Amit Singh Thakur as Sanjeev Garewal – Nandini's brother; Mitali's husband; Monica's father (2021–2023)
- Ritu Vashishtha as Mitali "Meetu" Garewal – Sanjeev's wife; Monica's mother (2021–2023)

==== Mehra ====
- Pranav Misshra as Akshay "Akki" Mehra – Dhirendra and Sarika's son; Sarangi, Priya, Maitri and Sandhya's cousin; Shivina's widower (2021–2022)
- Ajita Kulkarni as Sarika Mehra – Dhirendra's wife; Akshay's mother (2021–2022)
- Krishna Saajnani as Dhirendra Mehra – Meera's brother; Sarika's husband; Akshay's father (2021–2022)

==== Khanna ====
- Yajuvendra Singh as Yash Khanna – Veena's husband; Avni's father. (2022–2023)
- Jyoti Tiwari as Veena Khanna – Yash's wife; Avni's mother. (2022–2023)

==== Others ====
- Reena Aggarwal as Vedika Kumar – Ram's ex-girlfriend; Shashi's ex-wife (2021–2022) (Antagonist)
- Utkarsh Gupta as Kunal Jeet Baweja – Ram and Priya's friend (2021–2022)
- Poorti Arya as Twinkle Singh – Priya's friend; Vikrant's ex-wife (2021)
- Piyush Sahdev as Krish Dixit – Priya's friend; Ram's private investigator (2022)
- Puneet Panjwani as Minister – Kanika's husband (2022)
- Menka Rai as Kanika – Minister's wife (2022) (Former antagonist)
- Shantanu Monga as Varun – Sara's ex-husband; Ishaan's adoptive father (2022) (Antagonist)
- Roshan Kapoor as Mahir – Monica's nephew; Pihu's ex-fiance (2023)
- Mehak Ghai as Samaira Malhotra; an Industrialist (2023)
- Aishwarya Aher as Sania – Kiara's friend (2023)

=== Guest appearances ===
- Pawandeep Rajan in the song "Bhangra Ta Sajda" and "Bade Achhe Lagte Hain" during Ram and Priya's Sangeet Party (2021)
- Arunita Kanjilal in the song "Bhangra Ta Sajda" and "Bade Achhe Lagte Hai" during Ram and Priya's Sangeet Party (2021)
- School of Kids Choir in the song "Bade Achhe Lagte Hain" during Ram and Priya's Sangeet Party (2021)
- Raftaar to promote the song "Ghana Kasoota" (2021)
- Rashmeet Kaur to promote the song "Ghana Kasoota" (2021)
- Sakshi Tanwar as Sheel Chaudhary, to promote Mai: A Mother's Rage (2022)
- Taapsee Pannu as Antara, to promote Dobaaraa (2022)

== Production ==
=== Development ===
In May 2021, it was confirmed that Ekta Kapoor's show, Bade Achhe Lagte Hain which was originally broadcast from 2011 to 2014 will return with a fresh cast and different storyline.

=== Casting ===
Nakuul Mehta was finalized to play the male lead, Ram Kapoor. For the female lead Priya Sood, Divyanka Tripathi was approached who rejected the offer and eventually, Disha Parmar was signed by the makers. The show marks the second collaboration between Mehta and Parmar as they previously co-starred in Pyaar Ka Dard Hai Meetha Meetha Pyaara Pyaara (2012–2014).

In December 2022, Nakuul Mehta decided to quit the show. He said, "I feel, creatively, full having been a part of it for so long. The story is going to places and I feel going ahead there’s nothing new I can bring to it. I will miss playing Ram. I feel I have paid my dues to the makers and the audiences in the last 18 months."

In January 2023 it was confirmed that show will take a generation leap. Leenesh Mattoo, Pooja Banerjee, Niti Taylor and Randeep Rai were cast as Angad, Pihu, Prachi and Raghav respectively.

=== Release ===
The first promo of the series was revealed and released by the show producer Ekta Kapoor on 12 August 2021 featuring Nakuul Mehta and Disha Parmar as Ram and Priya. The first look poster of the upcoming season of the series was unleashed by the show leads Nakuul Mehta and Disha Parmar, at the grand finale episode of Indian Idol 12. The show's premier date was officially announced on 19 August 2021.

=== Crossover ===
Bade Achhe Lagte Hain 2 and Appnapan – Badalte Rishton Ka Bandhan came together for an integration week, called "Mahasangam Saptah". The episodes revolved around Vikrant and Sara's wedding ceremonies, which took place in Meerut.

== Reception ==
=== Critical reception ===
Letty Mariam Abraham of Mid-Day stated "Mehta and Parmar put their best foot forward as they carry the show on their shoulders." She also noted that if the series is "relatable without indulging in melodrama ... it may well surpass its original."

Gursimran Kaur of Times Of India stated "Nakuul Mehta steps into the shoes of Ram Kapoor beautifully. He does justice to his part. Disha Parmar takes the cake with her simplicity and genuinity."

== Soundtrack ==
Bade Achhe Lagte Hain 2 Original Sound Track

Soundtrack album by Lalit Sen and Nawab Arzoo
- Released: 30 August 2021
- Genres: Romance; Soundtrack
- Length: 4:40
- Language: Hindi
- Label: Sony Entertainment Television
- Producers: Ekta Kapoor; Shobha Kapoor

Bade Achhe Lagte Hain 2's soundtrack music is given by Lalit Sen and Nawab Arzoo. The theme song music is composed by R. D. Burman and sung by Shreya Ghoshal and Trijayh Dey.

Bade Achhe Lagte Hain 2: Tracklisting
| No. | Title | Artist | Length |
|---|---|---|---|
| 1. | "Bade Achhe Lagte Hain" (Duet) | Shreya Ghoshal; Trijayh Dey | 4:40 |

== Sequel ==
The spiritual sequel Bade Achhe Lagte Hain 3 premiered on 25 May 2023. It stars the seasons leads Nakuul Mehta and Disha Parmar as Ram and Priya. The series will have a different story from the previous ones.

== Awards and nominations ==
| Year | Award | Category | Recipient | Result | Ref. |
|---|---|---|---|---|---|
| 2022 | 21st Indian Television Academy Awards | Best Actor (Popular) | Nakuul Mehta | Nominated | |
| 2022 | 21st Indian Television Academy Awards | Best Actor (Drama) | Nakuul Mehta | Won | |
| 2022 | 21st Indian Television Academy Awards | Popular Actress (Drama) | Disha Parmar | Nominated | |
| 2022 | 21st Indian Television Academy Awards | Best Show (Popular) | Ekta Kapoor | Nominated | |
| 2022 | 22nd Indian Television Academy Awards | Best Actress (Drama) | Disha Parmar | Won | |
| 2022 | 22nd Indian Television Academy Awards | Best Actor (Drama) | Nakuul Mehta | Won | |
| 2022 | 22nd Indian Television Academy Awards | Best Show (Drama) | Ekta Kapoor | Nominated | |

== See also ==
- List of programs broadcast by Sony Entertainment Television
