= Sarah-Jane Dias =

Indian actress (born 1982)

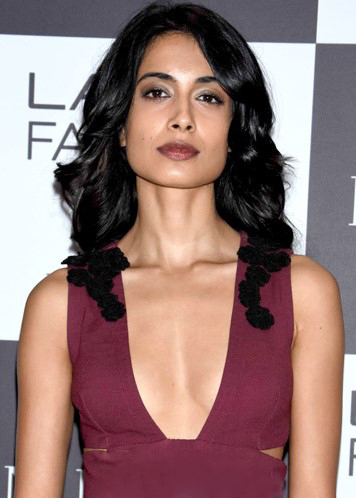
- Dias at Lakme Fashion Week 2017
- Born: 3 December 1982 (age 43); Muscat, Oman
- Citizenship: India
- Education: St. Andrew's College of Arts, Science and Commerce
- Occupations: Actress, musician
- Modeling information
- Height: 1.75 m (5 ft 9 in)

Sarah-Jane Dias is an Indian actress, TV host, video jockey, model and beauty pageant titleholder who won the title of Femina Miss India World in 2007 and represented India at Miss World 2007. She was also a video jockey for Channel V.

== Early life ==
Sarah-Jane Dias was born in Muscat, Oman to a Konkani-speaking Goan Catholic family. Her father, Eustace Dias, is a marketing manager with Oilfields Supply Centre and her mother is named Yolanda. She also has a sister named Elena Rose Dias.

Dias attended Indian School Al Wadi Al Kabir until Grade 10, then she joined Indian School, Muscat doing her 11th and 12th. She then attended university at Mumbai's St. Andrews College. Prior to winning Miss India World title in 2007, she had won the Miss India Oman title in 1997.

== Pageantry ==
In Mumbai, Dias was discovered by Suresh Natrajan by chance when she walked onto his set and was immediately hired for the campaign he was shooting. At the age of 21, she won a talent hunt TV show, which gave her a chance to host a Channel V show. She then became the host of Get Gorgeous, a supermodel hunt TV show on the network.

In 2006, Dias featured in the music video for Australian rock group INXS's "Never Let You Go" from their album Switch.

The next year Dias participated in Femina Miss India 2007. She subsequently won the title of Femina Miss India World 2007 and represented the country at Miss World 2007 but was not place.

== Acting career ==
=== Film debut and few successes (2010-2017) ===
Dias made her acting debut in the 2010 Tamil romantic comedy film, Theeradha Vilaiyattu Pillai opposite Vishal. In the next year, she first made her Hindi debut with Game opposite Abhishek Bachchan and then made her Telugu debut opposite Pawan Kalyan in Panjaa. All films were box office failures. The last of these earned her SIIMA Award for Best Female Debut – Telugu nomination.

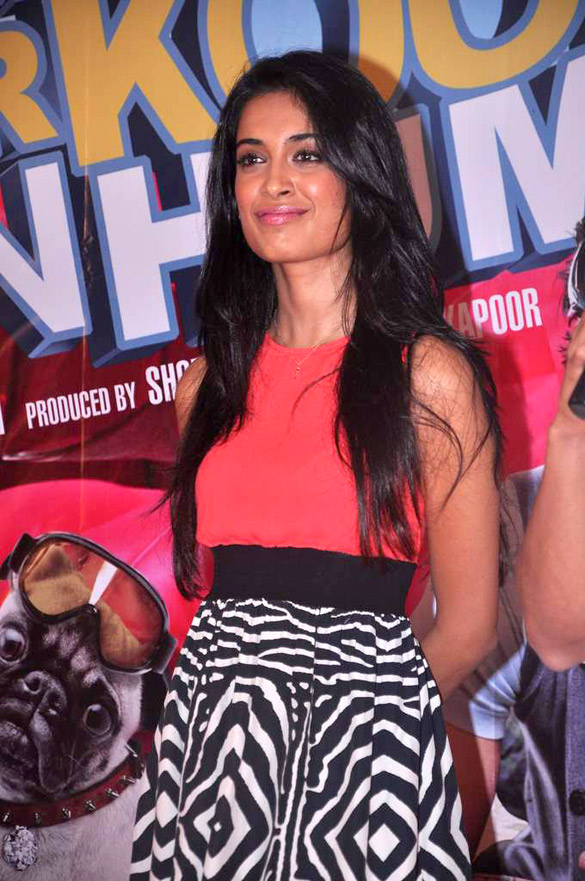
Dias at promotions of Kyaa Super Kool Hai Hum in 2012

Dias had her first commercial success with the 2012 adult comedy film Kyaa Super Kool Hai Hum, where she played a model Anu, opposite Ritesh Deshmukh. Taran Adarsh praised her performance and added that she "gets it right". She received the Stardust Award for Superstar of Tomorrow – Female nomination for the film.

Post a year hiatus, she appeared in O Teri opposite Pulkit Samrat, playing a senior journalist Monsoon. In the same year, she played Laila, a host in Happy New Year, alongside Shah Rukh Khan. In 2015, Dias played a fashion photographer, Frieda in Angry Indian Goddesses. Her performance was mostly well received by critics. While Namrata Joshi of The Hindu noted that she shows "admirable poise", Anna MM Vetticad termed her a "revelation".

In 2016, she played Amira in Zubaan, opposite Vicky Kaushal. Rohit Vats of Hindustan Times noted, "After a fabulous job in Angry Indian Goddesses, Sarah Jane Dias only gets better here." In 2017, she appeared in the English film, Viceroy's House.

=== Expansion to web series (2017-present) ===
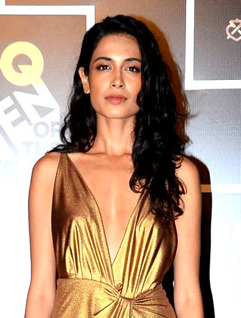
Dias at an event

Post these films, Dias has many appeared in web series. In 2017, she played major roles in Inside Edge, Time Out and had a special appearance in Ultimate Beastmaster. In 2019, she played Rose in Parchhayee. In 2021, she played a politician's wife Ayesha, opposite Saif Ali Khan in Tandav.

In 2022, Dias played Lavanyaa in the second season ofNever Kiss Your Best Friend, opposite Nakuul Mehta. Writing for News 18, Zinia Bandyopadhyay stated, "Sarah Jane Dias portrays the vulnerability of her character under the tough exterior with ease." Her performance earned her the ITA Award for Best Supporting Actress - Drama (OTT).

In 2023, Dias first played Julia in an episode of Made in Heaven and then played a CIA agent Radha in The Freelancer.

== Filmography ==
=== Films ===
- All films are in Hindi unless otherwise noted.

Year	Film	Role	Notes	Ref.
2010	Theeradha Vilaiyattu Pillai	Priya	Tamil film	
2011	Game	Maya Malhotra		
2011	Panjaa	Sandhya	Telugu film	
2012	Kyaa Super Kool Hain Hum	Anuradha “Anu” Marlo		
2014	O Teri	Monsoon Krishnacharya		
2014	Happy New Year	Laila		
2015	Angry Indian Goddesses	Freida De Silva		
2016	Zubaan	Amira	Hindi-Punjabi bilingual film	
2017	Viceroy's House	Sunita	Hindi-English bilingual film	
2024	The Buckingham Murders	Indrani	Hindi-English bilingual film	

=== Television ===
Year	Film	Role	Notes	Ref.
2017	Inside Edge	Meera Nagpal	Season 1	
2017	Time Out	Radha		
2017	Ultimate Beastmaster	Herself	Special appearance	
2019	Parchhayee	Rose		
2021	Tandav	Ayesha Pratap Singh		
2022	Never Kiss Your Best Friend	Lavanyaa Oberoi	Season 2	
2023	Made in Heaven	Julie Mendez	Episode: "A Taste of Heaven"	
2023	The Freelancer	Radha Lampat Baxi		
2025	Kankhajura	Nisha Gaonkar		

== Awards and nominations ==
Year	Award	Category	Work	Result	Ref.
2012	South Indian International Movie Awards	Best Female Debut – Telugu	Panjaa	Nominated	
2013	Stardust Awards	Superstar of Tomorrow – Female	Kyaa Super Kool Hain Hum	Nominated	
2023	Indian Television Academy Awards	Best Supporting Actress - Drama (OTT)	Never Kiss Your Best Friend 2	Won	

Awards and achievements
Preceded by (India) Natasha Suri	Femina Miss India World; 2007	Succeeded by (India) Parvathy Omanakuttan
