= I Don't Watch TV =

2016 Indian sitcom web series

- Genre: Sitcom
- Created by: Nakuul Mehta; Alekh Sangal; Ram Menon
- Written by: Ajay Singh
- Directed by: Ajay Singh; Mohanjeet Kalsi; Ashwin Pal
- Composers: Advait Nemlekar; Vaibhav Ambole; Suraj Bardia
- Country of origin: India
- Original language: Hindi
- No. of seasons: 1
- No. of episodes: 5

Production
- Producers: Nakuul Mehta; Alekh Sangal; Ajay Singh
- Production location: Mumbai
- Cinematography: Uday Mohite
- Camera setup: Multi camera
- Running time: 19 min approx
- Production company: Timbuktu Productions

Original release
- Network: Arré; YouTube
- Release: 15 April – 12 June 2016

I Don't Watch TV is an Indian sitcom web series which premiered on 15 April 2016 and stream on Arré and YouTube. This show is produced by Nakuul Mehta, Alekh Sangal and Ajay Singh. This web series is based on the real life of the Indian television actors and actresses. The show starring Nakuul, Alekh, Ram and other twenty one total actors and actresses.

== Cast ==
=== Main ===
- Nakuul Mehta as himself
- Ram Menon as himself
- Alekh Sangal as himself

=== Recurring ===
- Jankee Parekh as herself
- Drashti Dhami as herself
- Disha Parmar as herself
- Dilnaz Irani as Madam
- Rithvik Dhanjani as himself
- Karan Wahi as himself
- Ridhi Dogra herself
- Karan Patel as himself
- Kritika Kamra herself
- Rita Bhaduri as Baa
- Tanuja Chaturvedi as Nakuul's mother
- Anirudh Dave as himself
- Sanaya Irani as herself
- Aneri Vajani as Tulsi
- Bhupesh Singh as Kranti Sharma
- Mukesh Chhabra as himself
- Arjun as himself
- Sana Sheikh herself
- Aruna Sangal as herself
- K.C. Shankar as himself

== Episodes ==
No.	Title	Original release date
1	"Inglorious Constipated Basturds"	15 April 2016
2	"That 'Shit' We Do"	7 May 2016
3	"Get Me Outt This Shit"	26 May 2016
4	"Let’s Do Some Films"	23 June 2016
5	"Season Finale"	12 July 2016
