= Alefia Kapadia =

Indian television actress

- Born: India
- Education: Jai Hind College
- Occupation: Actress - Model
- Years active: 1995–present
- Notable work: Pyaar Ka Dard Hai Meetha Meetha Pyaara Pyaara
- Website: www.alefiakapadia.com

Alefia Kapadia is an Indian film and television actress, model and certified life coach. She has done many roles in various Indian television shows. She made her television debut in Just Mohabbat, followed by Daaman. She has also appeared in the series Star Bestsellers, Rishtey, C.I.D, Pyaar Ka Dard Hai Meetha Meetha Pyaara Pyaara, SuperCops vs Supervillains, Hamari Sister Didi, Savdhaan India and Aahat. She recently appeared in Laut Aao Trisha.

== Personal life ==
In June 2024, Kapadia revealed that she is in relationship with her Bade Achhe Lagte Hain 2 co-actor Abhinav Kapoor.

== Filmography ==
=== Television ===
Year	Show	Role	Remark
1996–2000	Just Mohabbat	Pia Malhotra	
1998-2018	C.I.D.		Episodic Role
2001	Daaman		
2012–2014	Pyaar Ka Dard Hai Meetha Meetha Pyaara Pyaara	Latika Bafna / Latika Rubel Diwan	
2014–2015	Hamari Sister Didi	Aliya	
2014–2015	Mere Rang Mein Rangne Waali	Neha	
2015–2016	Savdhaan India	Niyati	Episodic role (Episode 1067)
2015–2016	Savdhaan India	Divya Atul Gupta	Episodic role (Episode 1245)
2015–2016	Savdhaan India	Rekha	Episodic role (Episode 1407)
2015–2016	Savdhaan India	Margi	Episodic role (Episode 1582)
2015–2016	Savdhaan India	Sarika	Episodic role (Episode 1677)
2015	Laut Aao Trisha	Deepika	Cameo role (Episode 156 - Episode 160)
2015	Reporters	Tarini	
2015	Satrangi Sasural	Karuna	
2015–2016	Chakravartin Ashoka Samrat	Vasudha	
2016–2017	Brahmarakshas... Jaag Utha Shaitan	Kammo	
2018	Yeh Hai Mohabbatein	Paranormal Expert	
2018	Prithvi Vallabh	Savitri	
2018–2019	Kaal Bhairav Rahasya Season 2	Pavitra	
2021–2023	Bade Achhe Lagte Hain 2	Saranghi "Sara" Sood	

=== Films ===
Year	Title	Role	Notes
2019	Barot House	Sophia D'Souza	
2021	Dybbuk	Darshana Sanghvi	

== Career ==
- Alefia started her modeling career in the 1990s, when she was a teenager.
- She appeared in Remo Fernandes' music video, O Meri Munni.
- She appeared in a short film, Stolen Heart, in 2014.
