= Pranav Misshra =

Indian film actor and writer

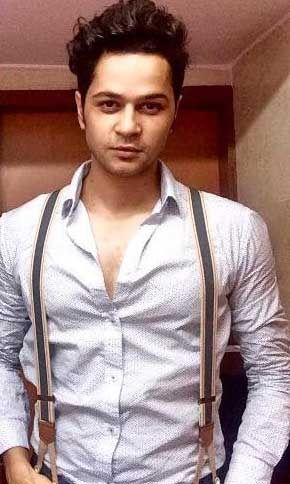
- Occupations: Actor, writer
- Years active: 2010–present
- Height: 6.2 ft (189 cm)

Pranav Misshra is an Indian film actor writer and producer. He played the role of Prem Singh Rathod in the television series Aisi Deewangi Dekhi Nahi Kahin on Zee TV. Misshra has appeared in several television productions, including Kya Huaa Tera Vaada as Ajay Gujral, MTV's Timeout With Imam (2013), Jodha Akbar as Mirza Hakim (2013–15), and Naagin Season 1 (2015) as Arjun. He was also featured in MTV Girls on Top as Shekhar, Kasam Tere Pyaar Ki as Nakul Singh Bedi, and Albeli Kahani Pyar Ki as Geet Gandhi.

Misshra began his career with roles in various television shows. He later appeared as Karan in Internet Wala Love on Colors TV and took on the role of Akki, a parallel lead character, in Bade Achhe Lagte Hain 2 on Sony TV.

Misshra was also associated with the 2023 film Kerala Story.

== Filmography ==
=== Films ===
Year	Show	Role	Language	Notes
2023	The Kerala Story	Abdul	Hindi	Debut lead role film

=== Television ===
Year	Show	Role
2012	Kya Huaa Tera Vaada	Ajay Gujral
2013	MTV Time-Out	Pranav Misshra
2015	Albeli Kahani Pyar Ki	Geet Gandhi
2015	Jodha Akbar	Mirza Hakim
2015–2016	Naagin	Arjun Mathur
2016	MTV Girls on Top	Shekhar
2016	Kasam Tere Pyaar Ki	Nakuul Singh Bedi
2017–2018	Aisi Deewangi Dekhi Nahi Kahi	Prem Singh Rathod
2019	Internet Wala Love	Karan Sharma
2021–2022	Bade Achhe Lagte Hain 2	Akshay Mehra
2022	Swaraj	Azimulla Khan
2024	Bhed Bharam	Vivek Sanyasi
