= Nakuul Mehta =

Indian actor (born 1983)

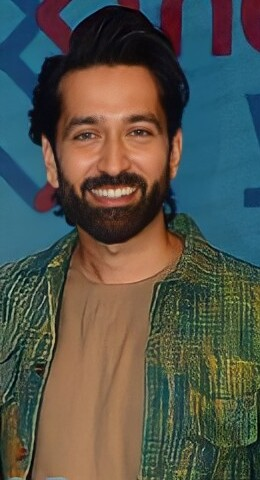
- Mehta in 2022
- Born: 17 January 1983 (age 43); Mumbai, Maharashtra, India
- Occupation: Actor
- Years active: 2005–present
- Known for: Pyaar Ka Dard Hai Meetha Meetha Pyaara Pyaara; Ishqbaaaz; Bade Achhe Lagte Hain 2
- Spouse: Jankee Parekh Mehta (m. 2012)
- Children: 2
- Website: nakuulmehta.com

Nakuul Mehta (born 17 January 1983) is an Indian actor who primarily works in Hindi television. Mehta is known for his portrayal of Shivaay Singh Oberoi in Ishqbaaaz and Ram Kapoor in Bade Achhe Lagte Hain 2. He is a recipient of four ITA Awards, four Gold Awards and three Indian Telly Awards.

Mehta made his television debut in 2012 with Pyaar Ka Dard Hai Meetha Meetha Pyaara Pyaara playing Aditya Kumar, which earned him two Best Debut Male awards. Later, he earned critical acclaim with his portrayals in Ishqbaaaz and Bade Achhe Lagte Hain 2. Both these shows earned him two ITA Awards for Best Actor Popular and established him as a leading television actor.

Mehta made his web debut in 2016 with I Don't Watch TV, which he co-produced. He has since starred in the series Never Kiss Your Best Friend (2020-2022), the short film Ved and Arya (2020) and Bade Achhe Lagte Hain 3 (2023). Mehta is married to singer Jankee Parekh with whom he has a son and daughter.

== Early life ==
Nakuul Mehta's family hails from Udaipur, Rajasthan. His father, Pratap Singh Mehta, is a veteran of the Indo-Pakistani War of 1971, while his great-great grandfather Laxmilal Mehta was the military commander of the Mewar region.

Mehta completed his Master of Commerce from Mumbai University. He was also trained in dance forms including jazz, hip hop, break, folk, salsa and contemporary. He is a trained ballroom dancer having learned under India's foremost ballroom teacher and Bollywood choreographer Sandip Soparrkar. He represented Maharashtra in the All India Dance Sport Federation in June 2011. He was a silver medalist in the Latin Ballroom Category and is a gold medal winner in the Standard Ballroom category.

== Career ==
=== Debut and television breakthrough (2005–2015) ===
Mehta did commercials, music videos, and was associated with theatre for a long time. He made his acting debut with the 2005 Telugu film, Abhimaani and then worked in another Telugu film Indian Beauty in 2006. In 2008, he made his Hindi film debut with Haal-e-Dil, playing a painter Shekhar opposite Amita Patak. Taran Adarsh of Bollywood Hungama noted, "Nakuul Mehta in all fairness, is very confident, a bundle of energy and knows his job well. His expressions are perfect at all times." In 2011, he appeared in the short film Avant Garde, which received praises and was showcased at various film festivals. The film was a box office failure.

From 2012 to 2014, Mehta played Aditya Kumar in his television debut Pyaar Ka Dard Hai Meetha Meetha Pyaara Pyaara, opposite Disha Parmar. For his work in the show, he won the Indian Telly Award for Fresh New Face - Male and the Gold Award for Debut in a Lead Role - Male. In 2015, Mehta hosted India's Got Talent 6.

=== Success, accolades and web expansion (2016–2020) ===
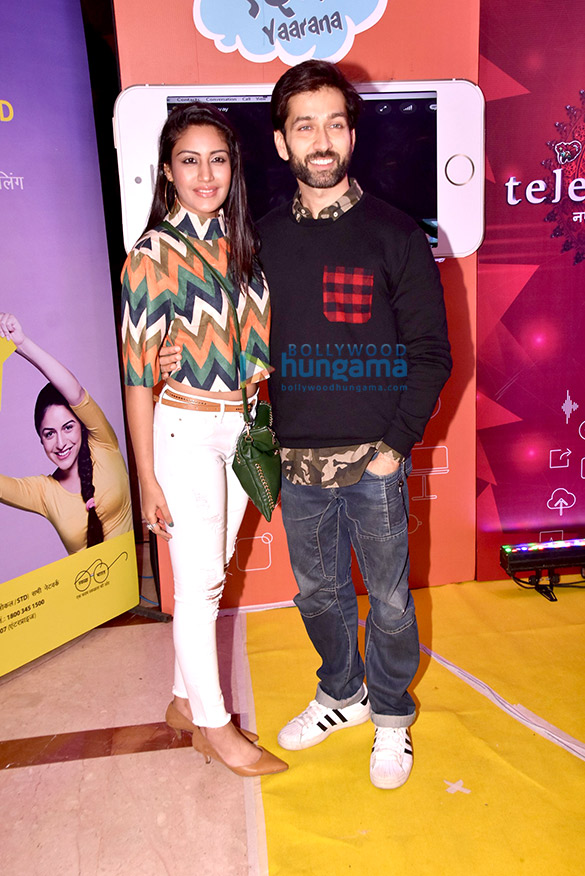
Mehta with Surbhi Chandna at an event in 2017

From 2016 to 2018, Mehta played Shivaay Singh Oberoi in Ishqbaaaz opposite Surbhi Chandna. The show proved to be a major success for him and earned him recognition. For playing Shivaay, he won numerous accolades including ITA Award for Best Actor - Popular, Indian Telly Award for Best Actor in a Lead Role and his pairing with Chandna won them Gold Best Onscreen Jodi award. In 2017, he played Shivaay in Indian television's first spin-off series, Dil Boley Oberoi opposite Surbhi Chandna. Also, from 2018 to 2019, he played Shivansh Singh Oberoi opposite Niti Taylor, post leap in Ishqbaaaz.

In 2016, Mehta made his web debut with I Don't Watch TV, which he also co-produced. It is a satire on the Indian television industry. In 2020, Mehta first appeared in the short film Ved and Arya alongside Sanaya Irani, playing a supportive brother. Rahul Desai of Film Companion stated, "Nakuul Mehta doesn't overdo the urbane drawl-coolness while reacting to his sister's confessions. His eyes are softer than his mannerisms."

Later in 2020, Mehta expanded his web career with Never Kiss Your Best Friend, playing Sumer Singh Dhillion, opposite Anya Singh. Shweta Keshri of India Today noted, "Nakuul Mehta played the 20 something Sumer with ease. The actor easily transitioned from a grown-up to a college boy in the flashback scenes." In the same year, he appeared in another series, BAE Control, playing Shyam.

=== Established actor (2021–present) ===
From 2021 to 2023, Mehta played Ram Kapoor in Bade Achhe Lagte Hain 2, reuniting with Disha Parmar. The show won him an ITA Award for Best Actor - Popular and two ITA Award for Best Actor - Drama. In 2021, he played Vishal in a segment of the series Zindagi in Short.

In 2022, Mehta first played Somesh alongside Naveen Kasturia in the short film Tasalli Se. Archika Khurana of The Times of India praised Mehta's for his "believable and restrained" performance. In the same year, he reprised Sumer Singh Dhillon in the second season of Never Kiss Your Best Friend, opposite Anya Singh and Sarah-Jane Dias. News18's Zinia Bandyopadhyay stated, "Nakuul Mehta is a good actor, and that translates on the screen here as well."

In 2023, Mehta played Ram Kapoor in Bade Achhe Lagte Hain 3, a sequel to the previous seasons, opposite Disha Parmar.

== Personal life ==
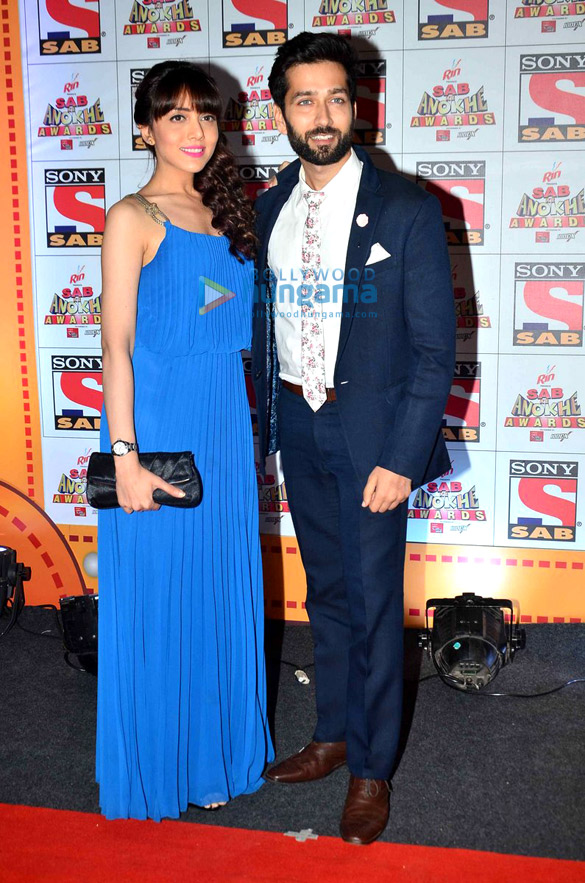
Mehta with his wife Jankee Parekh, in 2015

Mehta met singer Jankee Parekh when he was a teenager, and the couple was in a relationship for over a decade. On 28 January 2012, Mehta married Parekh in a traditional Hindu wedding ceremony. The couple had their first child on 3 February 2021, a boy, Sufi. On 15 August 2025, the couple welcomed their second child, a girl, Rumi.

=== Health ===
In June 2022, Mehta was hospitalised for 2 days in Sujoy Hospital in Juhu, Mumbai, with appendicitis. He underwent appendectomy, a minor surgery, and had his appendix removed.

== Other work and public image ==
Adit Ganguly of Cosmopolitan India termed him "charming, classy and charismatic" and noted, "Mehta is one of the biggest names in Indian television today and is perennially expanding the scope of his art and talent." Asjad Nazir from Eastern Eye noted Mehta's dashing "good looks" and ability to deliver a "winning performance". In the UK-based newspaper Eastern Eye's list of 50 Sexiest Asian Men, Mehta was placed 35th in 2017 and 16th in 2018. In the Times' Most Desirable Men on TV, Mehta was placed 15th in 2017.

Apart from his acting career, he is a celebrity endorser for several brands and products such as Westside, Fair & Handsome, Karbonn Mobiles and UltraTech Cement. He also featured in an Amazon Audible's ad film with Rithvik Dhanjani. Mehta has also hosted many award shows and events such as he hosted the Indian Television Academy Awards in 2014 and 2023. During the COVID-19 pandemic, he wrote and performed poems under the initiative #PoemsForHumanity, to raise funds for the needy. Mehta is also widely known for his fashion style.

== Filmography ==
=== Films ===
- All films are in Hindi unless otherwise noted.

Year	Title	Role	Notes	Ref.
2005	Abhimaani		Telugu film	
2006	Indian Beauty	Shekhar	Telugu film	
2008	Haal-e-Dil	Shekhar Oberoi		
2011	Avant Garde Pythagoras Sharma	Pythagoras Sharma	Short film	
2020	Ved and Arya	Ved	Short film	
2022	Tasalli Se	Somesh	Short film	
2024	Fairy Folk	—N/a	Co- producer	

=== Television ===
Year	Title	Role	Notes	Ref.
2012–2014	Pyaar Ka Dard Hai Meetha Meetha Pyaara Pyaara	Aditya Kumar		
2015	India's Got Talent	Host	Season 6	
2016–2018	Ishqbaaaz	Shivaay Singh Oberoi		
2018–2019	Ishqbaaaz	Shivaansh Singh Oberoi		
2017	Dil Boley Oberoi	Shivaay Singh Oberoi		
2021–2023	Bade Achhe Lagte Hain 2	Ram Kapoor		
2023	Bade Achhe Lagte Hain 3	Ram Kapoor		
2024	Crime Patrol	Host		

==== Special appearances ====
Year	Title	Role	Ref.
2012	Saath Nibhaana Saathiya	Aditya Kumar	
2012	Ek Doosre Se Karte Hain Pyaar Hum	Aditya Kumar	
2012	Mann Kee Awaaz Pratigya	Aditya Kumar	
2012	Ek Hazaaron Mein Meri Behna Hai	Aditya Kumar	
2012	Iss Pyaar Ko Kya Naam Doon?	Aditya Kumar	
2013	Saraswatichandra	Aditya Kumar	
2013	Diya Aur Baati Hum	Aditya Kumar	
2014	Yeh Hai Mohabbatein	Aditya Kumar	
2016	Saath Nibhaana Saathiya	Shivaay Singh Oberoi	
2017	Dil Sambhal Jaa Zara	Shivaay Singh Oberoi	
2017	Yeh Rishta Kya Kehlata Hai	Shivaay Singh Oberoi	
2018	Yeh Hai Mohabbatein	Shivaay Singh Oberoi	
2021	Indian Idol 12	Ram Kapoor	
2024	Udne Ki Aasha	Himself	

=== Web series ===
Year	Title	Role	Notes	Ref.
2016	I Don't Watch TV	Himself	Also producer	
2020	Never Kiss Your Best Friend	Sumer Singh Dhillon	Season 1	
2020	BAE Control	Shyam		
2021	Zindagi in Short	Vishal	Segment: "Sunny Side Upar"	
2022	Never Kiss Your Best Friend	Sumer Singh Dhillon	Season 2	
2023	Star vs Food Survival	Himself	Episode 3	
2024	Bada Sheher Choti Family	Kartik Khanna	Mini series	
2025	Do You Wanna Partner	Bobby Bagga	Season 1	
2026	Space Gen: Chandrayaan	Arjun Verma	Season 1	

=== Voice artist ===
Year	Title	Role	Dub Language	Original Language	Ref.
2021	Free Guy	Guy	Hindi	English	
2023	Animal	Ranvijay Balbir Singh	English	Hindi	

== Awards and nominations ==
=== Television awards ===
Year	Award	Category	Work	Result	Ref.
2013	Indian Telly Awards	Fresh New Face Male	Pyaar Ka Dard Hai Meetha Meetha Pyaara Pyaara	Won	
2013	Gold Awards	Debut in a Lead Role Male	Pyaar Ka Dard Hai Meetha Meetha Pyaara Pyaara	Won	
2013	Big Star Entertainment Awards	Most Entertaining TV Actor	Pyaar Ka Dard Hai Meetha Meetha Pyaara Pyaara	Won	
2014	Indian Telly Awards	Best Onscreen Couple (with Disha Parmar)	Pyaar Ka Dard Hai Meetha Meetha Pyaara Pyaara	Won	
2016	Asian Viewers Television Awards	Male Actor Of The Year	Ishqbaaaz	Won	
2017	Asian Viewers Television Awards	Male Actor Of The Year	Ishqbaaaz	Won	
2017	Gold Awards	Best Actor in a Lead Role Jury	Ishqbaaaz	Won	
2017	Gold Awards	Best Actor in a Lead Role	Ishqbaaaz	Nominated	
2017	Gold Awards	Best Onscreen Jodi (with Surbhi Chandna)	Ishqbaaaz	Won	
2017	Indian Television Academy Awards	Best Actor Drama	Ishqbaaaz	Nominated	
2017	Indian Television Academy Awards	Best Actor Popular	Ishqbaaaz	Won	
2018	Indian Television Academy Awards	Best Actor Popular	Ishqbaaaz	Nominated	
2018	Indian Television Academy Awards	Best Actor Drama	Ishqbaaaz	Nominated	
2018	Gold Awards	Best Actor in a Lead Role	Ishqbaaaz	Won	
2018	Asiavision Awards	Best Actor (Television) - Hindi	Ishqbaaaz	Won	
2018	Asian Viewers Television Awards	Male Actor Of The Year	Ishqbaaaz	Nominated	
2019	Indian Telly Awards	Best Actor in a Lead Role	Ishqbaaaz	Won	
2022	21st Indian Television Academy Awards (Note: The 21st ITA Awards and 22nd ITA Awards were both held in 2022)	Best Actor Drama	Bade Achhe Lagte Hain 2	Won	
2022	21st Indian Television Academy Awards	Best Actor Popular	Bade Achhe Lagte Hain 2	Nominated	
2022	21st Indian Television Academy Awards	Best Actor Popular	Bade Achhe Lagte Hain 2	Nominated	
2022	22nd Indian Television Academy Awards	Best Actor Drama	Bade Achhe Lagte Hain 2	Won	
2022	22nd Indian Television Academy Awards	Best Actor Popular OTT	Never Kiss Your Best Friend 2	Nominated	

=== Others ===
Year	Award	Category	Result	Ref.
2020	Gold Glam and Style Awards	Stylish Influencer Male	Won	
2022	Pinkvilla Screen and Style Icons Awards	Super Stylish TV Star Male	Won	
2023	Bollywood Hungama Style Icons	Most Stylish TV Actor – Male	Nominated	
2024	Bollywood Hungama Style Icons	Most Stylish TV Actor – Male	Won	

== See also ==
- List of Indian television actors
