= Abhinav Kapoor =

Indian television actor

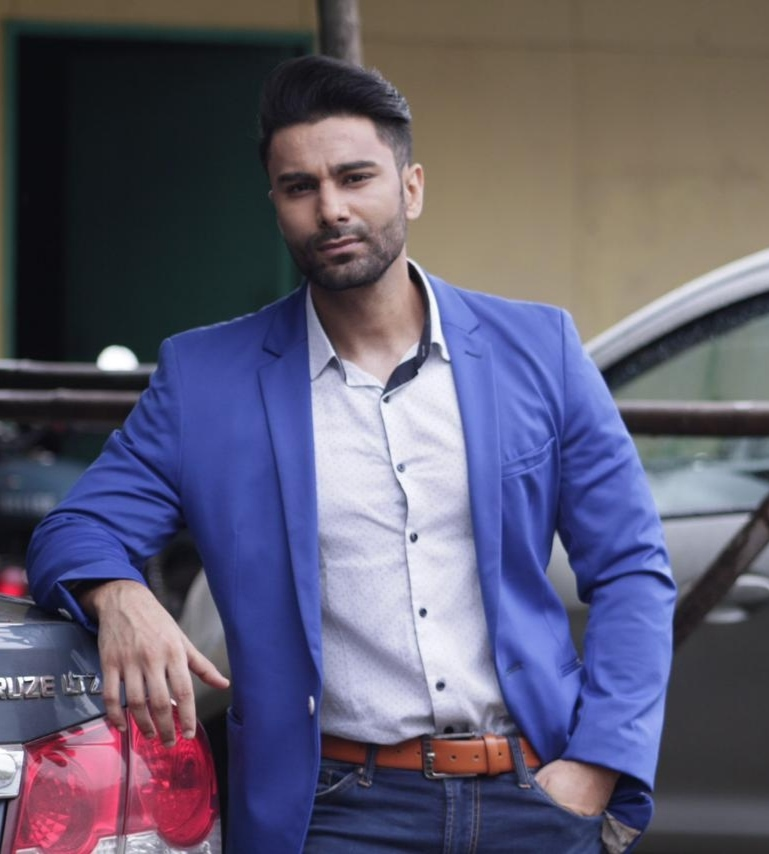
- Kapoor in 2023
- Born: 4 July 1984 (age 42); Bombay (now Mumbai), Maharashtra, India
- Education: Mithibai College, Mumbai
- Occupation: Actor
- Years active: 2004–present

Abhinav Kapoor (born 4 July 1984) is an Indian television actor. He has appeared in the notable shows Kasautii Zindagii Kay, Internet Wala Love, Bade Achhe Lagte Hain 2 and Ek Aastha Aisi Bhee.

== Life and career ==
=== Birth and education (1984–2004) ===
Abhinav Kapoor was born on 4 July 1984 in Bombay (now known as Mumbai), Maharashtra, India. He obtained his formal education from Mithibai College, Mumbai.

=== Early career (2004–2010) ===
In 2004, Kapoor ventured into mainstream television as an actor playing the brief cameo role of Aarav Jain in series Jeet. A breakthrough came for Kapoor in 2005, when Balaji Telefilms gave him a break in their iconic long running daily soap opera Kasautii Zindagii Kay. He portrayed Shravan Gupta Basu, the stepson of the main protagonist Anurag Basu (Cezanne Khan). Later, Kapoor teamed up with Balaji to play uncredited roles, which were factually unknown, between 2006 and 2009 in the successful soap operas Karam Apnaa Apnaa, Kkavyanjali and Kahe Naa Kahe.

=== Personal life ===
In June 2024, Kapoor revealed that he is dating co-actress Alefia Kapadia.

== Television ==
Year	Title	Role	Notes	Ref
2004	Jeet	Aarav Jain	Episodic Role	
2005	Kasautii Zindagii Kay	Shravan Gupta Basu	Recurring Cast	
2005–06	Kkavyanjali	Gaurav	Recurring Cast	
2006–09	Karam Apnaa Apnaa	Saurabh	Supporting Role	
2007–08	Kahe Naa Kahe	Kinju's elder brother	Supporting Role	
2008–10	Miley Jab Hum Tum	Yashvardhan/Yash Devraj Singh	Recurring Cast	
2010	Adaalat	Jaidip Sen	Episodic Role	
2011–13	Ek Hazaaron Mein Meri Behna Hai	Unknown	Recurring Cast	
2012	Savdhaan India	Deveshwar Rao	Episodic Role	
2014	Emotional Atyachar	Abhinav Singh	Lead	
2014–19	Box Cricket League	Himself	Reality Show	
2015	Dilli Wali Thakur Gurls	Aman Kapoor	Supporting Role	
2017	Ek Aastha Aisi Bhee	Balwan Agarwal	Parallel Lead Role	
2018–20	Dil Hi Toh Hai	Aman Verma	Parallel Lead Role	
2019	Internet Wala Love	Premal Kumar	Supporting Role	
2020	Dating Siyapaa	Bodybuilder Boyfriend	Lead	
2021	Bade Achhe Lagte Hain 2	Vikrant Arora	Supporting Role	
