= Qaidi Band =

2017 film directed by Habib Faisal

- Film poster
- Directed by: Habib Faisal
- Written by: Habib Faisal
- Produced by: Aditya Chopra
- Starring: Aadar Jain; Anya Singh; Sachin Pilgaonkar; Peter Muxka Manuel; Prince Parvinder Singh; Cyndy Khojol
- Cinematography: Anay Goswamy
- Edited by: Aarti Bajaj
- Music by: Songs: Amit Trivedi; Score: Hitesh Modak
- Production company: Yash Raj Films
- Distributed by: Yash Raj Films
- Release date: 25 August 2017
- Running time: 119 minutes
- Country: India
- Language: Hindi

Qaidi Band (transl. Prisoner Band) is a 2017 Indian Hindi-language musical drama film directed by Habib Faisal and produced by Aditya Chopra. Starring newcomers Aadar Jain and Anya Singh in the lead roles, the film revolves around a group of seven innocent under-trials, who give a band performance in prison to get into the good books of the authorities and secure their acquittal.

The film was released on 25 August 2017.

== Plot ==
The film opens in a jail in India where in the male ward, a bunch of under-trail prisoners are trying to catch a mouse, which ends up becoming a betting game for all the other prisoners. Sanju the under-trail prisoner who successfully catches the mouse takes his share and leaves. Meanwhile, in the girls' ward, Bindu an under-trail prisoner is illegally earning money by providing her fellow prisoners with eyebrow-cutting and manicure services. A senior prisoner refuses to pay her and Bindu angrily steals money from her and runs. The other girls chase her and thrash her brutally for her antics.

All the prisoners are called by the jailer SP Dhulia who announces that for the first time on the occasion of Independence Day of India, a male-female joint musical band of under-trail prisoners will be created to participate in the Independence Day function. He also announced that the band will be rewarded with grace points, which will help them to get their jail sentences cleared at the earliest. Subsequently, auditions happen and Sanju and Bindu are selected for the band along with Maskeen Singh, Ogu, Rufi, Tatyana and Sange. The group bonds quickly and decides to give their best to get their jail charges cleared as soon as possible, as per the promise of Dhulia. They also reveal their reasons for being imprisoned. Sanju has been framed by the husband of a woman whom he had given a lift on a rainy night to reach home, for trying to molest her. Bindu was accused of trying to kidnap her niece by her brother-in-law who was actually indulging in violence with his wife and daughter. Rufi reveals that after his wedding, he purchased a car which was stolen. After a few days, he discovered that the bomb blast in his city was triggered by his car. Since he hadn't registered a missing complaint of his car, he is framed for being a part of a terrorist group. Ogu is imprisoned for trying to procure drugs in Goa.

== Cast ==
- Aadar Jain as Sanju
- Anya Singh as Bindu
- Sachin Pilgaonkar as Dhulia
- Mikhail Yawalkar as Rufi
- Prince Parvinder Singh as Maskeen Singh
- Peter Muxka Manuel as Ogu
- Cyndy Khojol as Sangey
- Ram Kapoor as Naveen Vachani
- Anna Ador as Tatyana
- Lin Laishram
- Chhavi Awasthi as prisoner
- Ashi Singh as Tulika: The jailer's daughter
- Raman Khatri as Minister
- Deepika Dhulkotiya as Shopkeeper
- Sanvikaa as Reporter

== Soundtrack ==
Qaidi Band

Soundtrack album by Amit Trivedi
- Released: 26 July 2017
- Recorded: 2017
- Studio: Yash Raj Studios
- Genre: Feature film soundtrack
- Length: 35:10
- Label: YRF Music
- Producer: Amit Trivedi

Amit Trivedi chronology
Dear Zindagi (2016)	Qaidi Band (2017)	Secret Superstar (2017)
External audio
- Audio Jukebox on YouTube

The lyrics for the songs have been written by Kausar Munir, Habib Faisal, Peter Muxka Manuel and Sidhant Mago. All the songs featured in the film are sung by Arijit Singh and Yashita Sharma. The soundtrack consists of 9 songs and was released on 26 July 2017 by YRF Music.

All music is composed by Amit Trivedi.

Original track listing
No.	Title	Lyrics	Singer(s)	Length
1.	"I am India"	Habib Faisal	Arijit Singh, Yashita Sharma	3:43
2.	"Hulchul"	Kausar Munir	Arijit Singh, Yashita Sharma	3:57
3.	"Phir Nayi"	Kausar Munir	Yashita Sharma	4:23
4.	"Junooni"	Kausar Munir, Sidhant Mago	Arijit Singh, Yashita Sharma	4:56
5.	"Udanchoo"	Kausar Munir	Arijit Singh, Yashita Sharma	3:27
6.	"Jag Mag"	Habib Faisal, Rap lyrics by Peter Muxka Manuel	Arijit Singh, Yashita Sharma, Peter Muxka Manuel	3:12
7.	"Poshampa"	Kausar Munir	Arijit Singh, Yashita Sharma	4:28
8.	"Phir Wohi"	Kausar Munir	Yashita Sharma	3:46
9.	"I am India" (Escape)	Habib Fasal	Amit Trivedi, Yashita Sharma	3:18
Total length:				35:10

== Critical reception ==
The film garnered mixed reviews from critics. In a review published by Hindustan Times, it received a rating of 2 out of 5. However, the review also lauded the music composer, Amit Trivedi, hailing him stating that "the genius of music composer Amit Trivedi, who is the real star of this interesting yet ordinary film."
