= Aisi Deewangi Dekhi Nahi Kahi =

Indian television series

- Genre: Indian soap opera
- Created by: Dee Jaa Films
- Written by: Mahesh Pandey; Aastha Rathod Naad; Swati
- Directed by: Rajeev; Noel Smith; Ankush Marode
- Creative director: Palki Malhotra
- Starring: Pranav Misshra; Jyoti Sharma
- Country of origin: India
- Original language: Hindi
- No. of seasons: 1
- No. of episodes: 181

Production
- Producers: Jatin Sethi; Aastha Rathod Naad; Piyush Gupta
- Production locations: Gujarat, India
- Camera setup: Multi-camera
- Running time: 22 minutes approx
- Production companies: Dee Jaa Films; Pixx Entertainment

Original release
- Network: Zee TV
- Release: 22 May 2017 – 2 February 2018

Aisi Deewangi Dekhi Nahi Kahi (trans: haven't seen madness like this) is an Indian romantic drama television series, produced by Dee Jaa Films, which premiered on 22 May 2017 and ended on 2 February 2018, being replaced by the series Kaleerein. It was broadcast on Zee TV. The show starred Pranav Misshra and Jyoti Sharma in the lead roles. Set in Gujarat, the story revolved around two individuals, Prem and Tejaswini, who started off in the wrong foot but eventually fell in love with each other.

== Plot ==
Tejaswini Metha is a middle-class girl who was given the opportunity to study at Rajpipla University. There, she meets the heirs of the Singh Rathore family including Prem who terrorizes the other students with his cousins. By opposing them regularly and one day saving their mothers from an attempted murder, Teja attracts the other members of this family's sympathy, contrary to Prem's wishes. He also creates much drama to drive her out of his house, because it turns out that Dharam, his father, authorized him to live under his roof after his nephews kidnapped him one evening from his campus.

Knowing that his new rival is living with him without telling his parents, Prem threatens Tejaswini to reveal the truth to his overbearing mother. But clever as she is, the concerned one blackmails him by threatening not to expose the identities of his kidnappers who happen to be Prem and his cousins. From there, their rivalry increases, until the day when Tejaswini, celebrating her success in the exams, sees Sharda, her mother, disembark at Dharam's mansion. As the girl is forced to leave town and be separated from her new family, everyone blames Prem for it, unaware that it was Prem's cousin Arjun who called Teja's mother.

Prem now senses Tejaswini's absence from the house, and blames himself. But, she returns a few days later to Rajpipla only to concentrate on her studies. Sharda made sure that her daughter promised her that she would no longer have any connection with the Rathores. Prem may try to bring his former rival home, but nothing works. Tejaswini's promise prevents him from succeeding. But soon another misunderstanding arises due to Prem and Tejaswini's different thoughts. They both become enemies again and then reconcile after a racing match.

Unable to keep her promise for too long, Tejaswini confronts her mother. The latter, after some hesitation, reveals to her the main reason for her contempt for the Rathores: Dharam is the murderer of her husband. Shocked by the news and without seeking to learn the truth about this story, Teja decides to take revenge on Dharam by using Prem's affection for her. Meanwhile, her cousin, Preeti, who joined Rajpipla University, fell in love with Prem. And knowing Teja's intentions, she goes so far as to ruin her marriage to stop him, even though Prem and Tejaswini eventually marry.

== Cast ==
=== Main ===
- Pranav Misshra as Prem Singh Rathod, Dharam Singh Rathod’s Son
- Jyoti Sharma as Tejaswini Prem Singh Rathod, Prem's wife

=== Recurring ===
- Aamir Dalvi as Rajveer Thakur, Tejaswini's Obsessed Lover
- Rasik Dave as Dharam Singh Rathod, Prem's father
- Hariom Kalra as Inspector Harish Mehta, Tejaswini's father
- Hina Rajput as Sarala Dharam Singh Rathod, Prem's mother
- Archi Pratik as Arjun Singh Rathore: Prem's cousin
- Simran Sharma as Preeti Arjun Singh Rathore: Arjun's wife; Tejaswini's cousin (Reformed in episode 181)
- Pratish Vora as Anand Singh Rathod, Prem's uncle, Vinay and Ajju's father
- Pari Gala as Priyal Anand Singh Rathod, Anand's wife, Vinay and Ajju's mother
- Nirmala Chandra as Sunaina Deep Singh Rathore: Deep's wife; Arjun's mother
- Bharat Arora as Deep Singh Rathore: Prem's uncle; Arjun's father
- Seema Bora as Sharda Mehta, Tejaswini's mother
- Kalpesh Patel as Hitesh Mehta, Tejasvini's uncle, Preeti and Pinky's father
- Arjun Manhas as Vinay Singh Rathod, Prem's cousin
- Ray Parihar as Ajju Singh Rathod, Prem's cousin
- Rajeev Singh as Principal
- Zeliya Christopher as Urmilla 'Urmi', Tejaswini's friend
- Minoli Nandwana as Pinky Mehta, Tejaswini's cousin

== Development ==
On 5 April 2017, the first promo of the show was released by Zee TV whilst the second promo was released on 26 April 2017. On 15 May 2017, the title song promo was released. On 17 May 2017, an extended promo of the title song was released before the show started on 22 May 2017.

== Controversy ==
In January 2018, actors Jyoti Sharma and Pranav Misshra accused show's producers of exploitation and mistreatment. which lead to the serial shutting down in February 2018.
