= Bade Achhe Lagte Hain 3 =

Indian television series

- Genre: Romance; Drama
- Created by: Ekta Kapoor
- Written by: Deepika Bajpai
- Story by: Saba Mumtaz
- Directed by: Muzammil Desai
- Starring: Nakuul Mehta; Disha Parmar
- Theme music composer: Composer; R. D. Burman; Music by Lalit Sen; Nawab Arzoo
- Opening theme: "Bade Achhe Lagte Hain" by Shreya Ghoshal
- Composers: Abhishek Singh; Mintu Jha
- Country of origin: India
- Original language: Hindi
- No. of episodes: 57

Production
- Producers: Ekta Kapoor; Shobha Kapoor
- Cinematography: Shahir Raza
- Editors: Vikas Sharma; Vishal Sharma
- Camera setup: Multi camera
- Running time: 22 minutes
- Production company: Balaji Telefilms

Original release
- Network: Sony Entertainment Television
- Release: 25 May – 11 August 2023

Related
- Bade Achhe Lagte Hain; Bade Achhe Lagte Hain 2 Bade Achhe Lagte Hain 4

Bade Achhe Lagte Hain 3 is an Indian Hindi-language television romantic drama series that premiered on 25 May 2023 until 11 August 2023 on Sony TV. Produced by Ekta Kapoor under the banner of her Balaji Telefilms, the show is the third installment of Bade Achhe Lagte Hain series. The series stars Nakuul Mehta and Disha Parmar.

== Plot ==
Ram Kapoor, a businessman, is fun-loving and kind-hearted and has recently tasted the success of his food delivery start-up with the help of his friend and business partner, Alekha Malhotra. He lives with his mother, Shalini Kapoor and best friend, Shardul, and is in a relationship with Kriti, whom Shalini disapproves of. On the other hand, Dr. Priya Sood, a dentist, is an optimist who lives with her parents and younger sister, Ritika, and has been in a relationship with Yuvraj Sharma, a competitive, overly ambitious person for the past six years.

The story takes a turn on New Year's Eve, where Ram celebrates his success with his colleagues, Yuvraj chances upon Alekha, and plans to become rich and successful instantly like Ram by hitching with her. Ritika suspects Yuvraj's behaviour, but Priya refuses to believe it, until finally he breaks up, leaving her devastated. He does so to be ahead of his friend, Akhil, who already has ditched Priya's friend for Ram's cousin, Sonalika. Priya's mother and sister inform Ram of Yuvraj's ill intentions during a ceremony meant for Yuvraj and Alekha as well as Akhil and Sonalika, held at the Kapoor Mansion.

Meanwhile, Shalini takes an instant liking towards Priya after a visit to her clinic on New Year's Eve, and wishes to have Ram marry her. She becomes happy assuming Ram and Priya are already in love with each other. Later, Ram and Priya are hospitalized after being injured in a shootout, where the paparazzi capture the two and wrongfully tag them as a couple. Shalini’s health deteriorates and she needs surgery. Her condition for getting it is if Ram gets married within the next week which is the same timeframe she has to get the surgery.

The news about Ram and Priya excites Shalini, who then approaches Priya's mother with their marriage proposal, and the latter instantly agrees as she feels Ram is the apt partner for Priya. Priya originally decides to say no to the relationship but Ram convinces her to say yes, saying that they have to remain married for three months so Shalini will get the surgery. Priya agrees and they hold the engagement. Yuvraj, scared that Priya will reveal why he is marrying Alekha, decides to expose the contract papers for the marriage. Shalini finds the papers and asks Priya and Ram about it. Priya twists it, saying that since people would assume that she was a gold digger, she had the papers made so no one would doubt her. Shalini now says that no one can doubt Priya because of how good she is. Shreya, Ram's cousin, and Kriti try to cancel Ram and Priya's marriage but it proceeds anyway and they start their journey thinking that it is just a three-month marriage contract.

Over the period, Ram and Priya come closer to each other, but this comes at the cost of the former's friendship with Alekha, who believes Ram is unjust towards Yuvraj post-marriage. On the other hand, Ram's relatives - Avinash and Shivani (paternal uncle-aunt), Tej and Mitali (maternal uncle-aunt), and Shreya (Tej-Mitali's daughter) plot to acquire the Kapoor wealth by poisoning Shalini through their housemaid Sheetal. When Sheetal backs out, Avinash injures her, slipping her into coma. Anju and Priya suspect foul play. This leads to Priya discovering that Shalini is being poisoned.

In an attempt to discard Priya as her major obstacle, Shreya defames Priya by publicising her pictures with Yuvraj. Despite the allegations, Ram still trusts Priya and confesses his love for her. Shalini, who too suspected Priya of foul play realises her mistake when Sonalika reveals Akhil's deceit, and how Priya has been her support. Soon enough, Ram and Priya are kidnapped after Kriti sedates their drinks, however, to her oblivion, Shreya uses this as an opportunity and is revealed to be the mastermind behind the kidnapping. Through this, Shreya and the relatives coerce Shalini to sign the will, but fail to do so. Ram and Priya save themselves and confess their love to each other and return to the Kapoor Mansion. Ritika exposes Shreya, who eventually confesses of all the wrongdoings, including how the Kapoor's relatives murdered Ram's father in the same fashion they did for Shalini. Shreya, Avinash, Shivani, Tej and Mitali are arrested for their crimes. Alekha breaks up with Yuvraj for his deceit. Kriti too leaves after Ram professes his love for Priya.

The couple finally reveal to their family of their contract marriage plan, but have fallen in love with each other. Sanjeev finally accepts Ram in the gesture the latter asked to. The story ends on beautiful takeaways of a love story from Ram and Priya amidst the rains.

== Cast ==
=== Main ===
- Nakuul Mehta as Ram Kapoor: CEO of IndiaEatz, Shalini's son; Priya's husband
- Disha Parmar as Dr. Priya Sood Kapoor: A Dentist; Anju and Sanjeev's daughter; Ritika's sister; Ram's wife

=== Recurring ===
- Supriya Shukla as Shalini Kapoor: Ram's mother; Priya's mother-in-law; Tej's sister; Sonalika, Gaurav, Shreya, and Rishabh's aunt
- Srishti Jain as Ritika Sood: Sanjeev and Anju's younger daughter; Priya's younger sister
- Milind Pathak as Sanjeev Sood: Anju's husband; Priya and Ritika's father
- Shivani Mahajan as Anju Sood: Sanjeev's wife; Priya and Ritika's mother
- Kimmy Kaur as Sanjeev's sister
- Akshit Sukhija as Yuvraj Sharma: Alekha's ex fiancé; Priya's former love interest
- Chirag Mehra as Shardul Arora: Ram's best friend
- Tanya Kalra as Alekha Malhotra: Ram's business partner; Yuvraj's ex fiancée
- Saadhika Syal as Kriti: Ram's ex-girlfriend
- Sanaz Irani as Sonalika Kapoor: Avinash and Shivani's daughter; Gaurav's sister; Ram's cousin
- Nitin Bhatia as Rishabh: Ram, Gaurav and Sonalika's cousin
- Ayush Shrivastava as Gaurav Kapoor: Avinash and Shivani's son; Sonalika's brother; Ram and Rishabh's cousin
- Suman Bajaj as Shalini's friend
- Viraj Nanda as Akhil

=== Guest ===
- Shivangi Joshi as Aradhana Sahni: Priya's college friend; Reyansh's employee from Barsatein - Mausam Pyaar Ka
- Kushal Tandon as Reyansh "Rey" Lamba: Aradhana's boss from Barsatein - Mausam Pyaar Ka

== Production ==
=== Development ===
The series was announced after the ratings of Bade Achhe Lagte Hain 2 fell. The original leads of the previous season were cast as the leads, marking their second collaboration with Ekta Kapoor.

=== Casting ===
Nakuul Mehta and Disha Parmar were cast as the leads, Ram and Priya, marking their third show together. Srishti Jain was cast as Ritika, Priya's sister while Akshit Sukhija was cast as the antagonist Yuvraj.

== Soundtrack ==
Bade Achhe Lagte Hain 3 Original Sound Track

Soundtrack album by Lalit Sen and Nawab Arzoo
- Released: 25 May 2023
- Genres: Romance; Soundtrack
- Length: 4:40
- Language: Hindi
- Label: Sony Entertainment Television
- Producers: Ekta Kapoor; Shobha Kapoor

Bade Achhe Lagte Hain 3's soundtrack music is given by Lalit Sen and Nawab Arzoo. The theme song was composed by R. D. Burman and sung by Shreya Ghoshal and Trijayh Dey.

Bade Achhe Lagte Hain 3: Tracklisting
| No. | Title | Artist | Length |
|---|---|---|---|
| 1. | "Bade Achhe Lagte Hain" (Duet) | Shreya Ghoshal; Trijayh Dey | 4:40 |

== Sequel ==
A spiritual sequel Bade Achhe Lagte Hain 4 was announced on 25 March 2025. It stars Harshad Chopda and Shivangi Joshi as Rishabh and Bhagyashree.
