= Kuch Toh Log Kahenge =

Indian television series (2011–2013)

- Genre: Drama
- Created by: Director Kut's Productions
- Written by: Kamlesh Pandey, Dilip Jha & Archita Vishwas
- Directed by: Mandar Devasthali, Sachin Gokhale, Sharad Pandey & Rishi Mandial
- Creative director: Ritesh Modi
- Starring: See below
- Theme music composer: Dony Hazarika
- Opening theme: "Saiyan Naino Ki Bhasha Samjhe Na" by Sukanya Purkayastha
- Country of origin: India
- Original language: Hindi
- No. of seasons: 1
- No. of episodes: 346

Production
- Cinematography: Satish Shetty
- Editor: Sameer Gandhi
- Running time: approx. 40 minute

Original release
- Network: Sony Entertainment Television India and Sony Entertainment Television Asia
- Release: 3 October 2011 – 28 March 2013

Kuch Toh Log kahenge (transl. People Will Say Something After All) is an Indian Hindi-language romantic comedy family drama television series which aired on Sony TV. It premiered on 3 October 2011 and ended on 28 March 2013. The series revolves around a team of doctors working at Dr. Kotnis General Hospital in Lucknow. The show was an official adaptation of the Pakistani television drama Dhoop Kinare.

== Plot ==
Kuch Toh Log Kahenge is a love story that centers around the lives of doctors working at Dr. Kotnis General Hospital in Lucknow. The two main characters, Dr. Ashutosh Mathur and Dr. Malika Trehan, are former college friends and colleagues at the hospital. Dr. Ashutosh is portrayed as a serious and somewhat aloof individual due to past experiences that have left a mark on him emotionally. He is not inclined towards frivolity or enjoyment and maintains a strict demeanor in both his personal and professional life.

Dr. Malika, on the other hand, secretly carries feelings for Dr. Ashutosh, which she subtly hints at by mentioning she has been waiting for him for over a decade. Despite her affections, Dr. Ashutosh shows no interest in pursuing a romantic relationship with her, largely due to the age gap between them.

The story takes a turn with the introduction of Dr. Nidhi Verma, a young and vibrant intern at the hospital. Dr. Nidhi's lively and cheerful nature contrasts with Dr. Ashutosh's serious demeanor. As time goes on, they develop a unique camaraderie, and Dr. Ashutosh finds himself drawn to her, despite the significant age difference between them. However, Dr. Malika perceives this growing connection and becomes envious, leading her to make attempts to create obstacles between them.

Dr. Malika's efforts lead to Nidhi's dismissal from the hospital, a decision influenced by her fear of the blossoming relationship between Ashutosh and Nidhi. Amidst misunderstandings and challenges, the two main characters eventually confess their love for each other. The narrative further unfolds as they navigate societal norms and family dynamics to unite against the odds.

Parallel to the central romance, various subplots add depth to the storyline. Dr. Rangnath, an administrator at the hospital, navigates his feelings for Anji, Nidhi's childhood friend. Another subplot revolves around the intricate relationships between family members and acquaintances, as well as their emotional journeys.

Throughout the series, the characters face emotional dilemmas, personal growth, and external pressures, which contribute to the overall complexity of the narrative. Themes such as love, sacrifice, societal expectations, and personal aspirations are interwoven into the plot, creating a multi-dimensional portrayal of human experiences.

The story also touches on topics like family conflict, professional challenges, and the impact of past decisions on present circumstances. As the characters grapple with their emotions and relationships, they evolve individually and collectively.

The show portrays the evolution of Ashutosh and Nidhi's love story from its inception, through trials and tribulations, to eventual triumph. The narrative highlights the significance of love, understanding, and perseverance in the face of adversity.

As the series progresses, various characters' lives intertwine, bringing about resolutions to their respective conflicts. The show weaves together numerous narrative threads, ultimately culminating in a satisfying conclusion.

Kuch Toh Log Kahenge presents a tale of romance and human relationships that engages viewers with its emotional depth and relatable characters. Through its exploration of love, sacrifice, and personal growth, the series resonates with audiences and offers a reflection of the complexities of real-life relationships.

== Cast ==
=== Main ===
- Kritika Kamra as Dr. Nidhi Yograj Verma / Dr. Nidhi Ashutosh Mathur
- Mohnish Bahl (Last Episode 110) / Sharad Kelkar (Entry Episode 115 in Timing 19:05) as Dr. Ashutosh Mathur

=== Recurring ===
- Ishita Sharma as Anjali Rangnath Acharya (née Solanki) (aka Anji): Fashion Designer
- Vishal Malhotra as Dr. Rangnath Acharya, Anji's husband
- Alok Nath as Dr. Ashish Mathur: Ashutosh's father, father in law of Colonel. Yograj "Trilok" Verma, Nidhi's grand father
- Karan Wahi as Rohan Solanki: Nidhi's Well Wisher
- Rukhsar Rehman as Dr. Mallika Trehan, Ashutosh's friend, Aditya's sister, Suhasini's sister-in-law
- Dakssh Ajit Singh as Mr. Daksh Bharadwaj: Mr. Bharadwaj's son
- Anju Mahendru as Dr. Aradhana Bharadwaj: Mr. Bharadwaj's wife
- Aradhana Uppal as Divya Bharadwaj: Mr. Bharadwaj's daughter
- Riyanka Chanda as Lubna
- Puneet Tejwani as Aditya Trehan: Brother of Mallika
- Nitesh Pandey as Armaan: DR. Ashutosh's friend (Entry in Episode 45)
- Vijay Kashyap as Colonel. Yograj "Trilok" Verma: Nidhi's father
- Nandita Puri as Shyama Solanki: Anjali's mother
- Sanatan Modi as Kapil Solanki: Anjali's father
- Kavita Vaid as Saroj Raani Verma: Nidhi's Dadi bua
- Dheeraj Dhoopar as Amar Tiwari
- Rajshri Deshpande as Suhasini Trehan: Mallika's Sister-in-law
- Manasi Parekh as Mandira
- Sheeba Chaddha as Sanjeevani Garg: Lawer of Dr. Ashutosh's House
- Amardeep Jha as Nurse D'souza
- Tanya Abrol as Phoolan
- Vinay Jain as Sandeep Bagchi
- Yash Gera as Bajrang Tiwari
- Sonal Vengurlekar as Dr. Ahana
- Sheena Bajaj as Dr. Aditi Rai
- Abhay Bhargava as Dr. Dubey
- Kaushal Kapoor as Dr. Rangnath's father
- Sachin Parikh aa Jagan Mehta
- Laal Singh Maan as Arnav: Patient Mrs. Harnam's husband

== Episode list ==
Run time of episodes is approximately 40 minutes.

Episode no.	Episode Name
1	Meet Ashutosh & Nidhi
2	Ashutosh & Nidhi's First Meeting
3	Nidhi Face's Trouble At Work
4	Nidhi's Day at The Children Ward
5	Anjali meets Dr. Rangnath
6	Nidhi Makes A Big Mistake
7	Shahenshah Is Out Of Danger
