= Pyaar Ka Dard Hai Meetha Meetha Pyaara Pyaara =

Indian romantic drama television series

- Genre: Soap opera
- Written by: Zama Habib; Sonali Jafar; Gitangshu Dey; Rohini Ninwane; Rahul Modi
- Directed by: Aashish Shrivasta; Kaushik Ghatak
- Starring: Disha Parmar; Nakuul Mehta; Mukesh Khanna
- Country of origin: India
- Original language: Hindi
- No. of episodes: 663

Production
- Producers: Kavita K. Barjatya; Sooraj Barjatya
- Production locations: Mumbai; Kullu; Manali
- Cinematography: Sanjay Malwankar
- Editors: Janak chauhan Masih habib
- Camera setup: 576i HDTV 1080i
- Running time: 24 minutes
- Production company: Rajshri Productions

Original release
- Network: Star Plus
- Release: 18 June 2012 – 1 November 2014

Pyaar Ka Dard Hai Meetha Meetha Pyaara Pyaara is an Indian Hindi-language romantic drama television series produced by Rajshri Productions. It aired from 18 June 2012 to 1 November 2014 on Star Plus. It starred Disha Parmar and Nakuul Mehta as Pankhuri Gupta Kumar and Aditya Kumar.

== Plot ==
Pankhuri Gupta is a simple girl from Kullu. Aditya Kumar, a rich boy in Mumbai, does not like relationships, having seen his parents Avantika and Harish separated for twenty years.

Purushottam Deewan (Aditya's maternal grandfather), a wealthy businessman, visits the Guptas in Kullu, determined to have Aditya marry Pankhuri.

Instead, Avantika fixes Aditya's engagement with Latika Bafna, who only wants the Deewans' money. Latika frames Aditya for taking advantage of her, but Pankhuri proves his innocence and rebukes Latika for conspiring against Aditya. After the incident, Aditya and Pankhuri become best friends. Pankhuri's parents fix Pankhuri's marriage to Shivam Mehta. Latika tries to ruin the wedding, prompting Shivam to leave. Aditya steps in and marries Pankhuri, and Avantika eventually wholeheartedly accepts her as her daughter-in-law after seeing her unconditional efforts to reunite her with Harish. Rubel, Avantika’s brother Anuj's son returns to India. He is a spoiled brat who hates Aditya and wants the family business and property, and marries Latika to do so. Avantika’s sister-in-law, Sheela and Latika plan and brainwash Anuj for property and make him acquire the power of attorney. They together plot against Aditya and Pankhuri and make them oust the Deewan house. They later fire Shanky, the family’s caretaker. Kaira, Anuj's daughter, hates Purushottam thinking he killed his wife Kaushalya. However, it is revealed that at a young age, Aditya was accidentally responsible for the death of Kaushalya who was in a state of coma. After learning the truth, Kaira apologises to Purushottam. The Deewans are reunited after many ups and downs. Anuj starts showing love and cares for his father Purushottam and his sisters, Avantika and Preeti by handing the reins of the business to Avantika and Aditya, that he had usurped. Preeti marries Sameer Deshpande, whose mother was a former nurse for the Dewan family.

Purushottam dies peacefully after uniting his family with Pankhuri's painstaking efforts. Purushottam's younger brother Manik and his family invite themselves to live in Deewan Mansion after the former's death.

A pregnant Latika joins Manik and his wife Manorama in their ulterior plans and undergoes an abortion but feigns a miscarriage blaming Pankhuri. Aditya is jailed and framed for possessing fake notes and illegal drugs, and is compelled by the wicked Manorama to divorce Pankhuri. Manik and Manorama soon reform after Manorama is paralyzed in an accident. Rubal divorces Latika, and falls in love with, and marries Payal. Pankhuri and Aditya remarry; Kapil (Manik's son) is arrested, and Kaira marries Varun.

The family reunites with Aneesha (the late Kaushalya's younger sister) who returns from Australia after decades. Vikram (Varun's elder brother) wants to use Kaira for revenge on Deewans as a decision by Avantika affects him negatively. The family eventually settles the problem. Aditya and Pankhuri argue. While she goes to Kullu, they patch over the phone just before disappearing in a landslide.

=== 2 years later ===
Harish meets Pankhuri's lookalike, Ayesha on a trip in Lucknow and uses Ayesha to convince Aditya that Pankhuri is no longer alive, failing, as Aditya realizes Ayesha is not Pankhuri. Ayesha falls in love with Aditya but keeps her feelings to herself, aware that Aditya only loves Pankhuri. Ayesha's mother Nilofer forces Aditya to marry Ayesha after Ayesha's image is tarnished by a photographer Arif.

Aditya later marries Ayesha to save Ayesha’s image; Avantika soon accepts Ayesha. Pankhuri is revealed to be alive and is returned to the Deewan mansion in a coma. Upon waking, she reveals being abducted for jewelry. Ayesha later leaves to pursue her dream of becoming a designer, accompanied by Aneesha, who considers Ayesha as her daughter. Avantika's past affair is revealed when her illegitimate son Ayush comes to live with the Deewan family.

Eventually, Harish accepts Ayush as his stepson. The show ends on a happy note with Pankhuri turning pregnant and everyone in the family reuniting and rejoicing: thus, fulfilling the dream of being a united and happy family that the late Purushottam Deewan had dreamt of.

== Cast ==
=== Main ===
- Disha Parmar as
  - Pankhuri Gupta Kumar: Ambika and Diwakar's daughter; Aditya's wife (2012–2014)
  - Ayesha Khan:(Pankhuri's lookalike) Nilofer's daughter; Nafisa and Rukhsaar's sister; Aditya's wife on papers for formality for sometime till Pankhuri returns ; Aditya and Pankhuri's friend (2014)
- Nakuul Mehta as Aditya "Adi" Kumar: Avantika and Harish's son; Ayush's half-brother; Ayesha’s ex-husband and Pankhuri's husband (2012–2014)

=== Recurring ===
- Manasi Salvi as Avantika Deewan Kumar: Puru and Kaushalya's daughter; Anuj and Preeti's sister; Harish's wife; Ayush and Aditya's mother (2012–2014)
- Nitesh Pandey as Harish Kumar: Sukhmani's son; Sarika's brother; Avantika's husband; Aditya's father; Ayush's step-father (2012–2014)
- Nikhil Sharma as Ayush Malhotra: Avantika's son; Harish's step-son; Aditya's half-brother (2014)
- Mehul Buch as Anuj Deewan: Puru and Kaushalya's son; Avantika and Preeti's brother; Sheela's husband; Rubel and Kaira's father (2012–2014)
- Sonali Naik as Sheela Deewan: Anuj's wife; Rubel and Kaira's mother (2012–2014)
- Khushwant Walia as Rubel Deewan: Sheela and Anuj's son; Kaira's brother; Latika's ex-husband; Payal's husband (2012–2014)
- Monica Khanna as Payal Deewan: Deepak's daughter; Rubel's second wife (2013–2014)
- Prinal Oberoi as Kaira Deewan Dhanrajgir: Sheela and Anuj's daughter; Rubel's sister; Manan's ex-girlfriend; Varun's wife (2013–2014)
- Prashant Upadhyay as Varun Dhanrajgir: Vikram's brother; Kaira's husband (2013–2014)
- Kanwarjit Paintal as Jagdish Prasad Gupta: Puru's friend; Mohina's husband; Diwakar, Pushkar and Kailash's father (2012–2014)
- Mukesh Khanna as Purushottam "Puru" Deewan: Manik's elder brother; Jagdish's friend; Kaushalya's husband; Anuj, Avantika and Preeti's father (2012–2013)
- Rita Bhaduri as Mohina Gupta: Jagdish's wife; Diwakar, Pushkar and Kailash's mother (2012)
- Kunwar Aziz Ustahi as Diwakar Gupta: Mohina and Jagdish's eldest son; Pushkar and Kailash's brother; Ambika's husband; Pankhuri's father (2012–2014)
- Leena Prabhu as Ambika Kaneria Gupta: Govardhan and Deepak's sister; Diwakar's wife; Pankhuri's mother (2012–2014)
- Faizal Qureshi as Pushkar Gupta: Mohina and Jagdish's second son; Diwakar and Kailash's brother; Sushma's husband; Neha's father (2012–2014)
- Ajita Kulkarni as Sushma Gupta: Pushkar's wife; Neha's mother (2012–2014)
- Abir Goswami/Vimarsh Roshan as Kailash Gupta: Mohina and Jagdish's youngest son; Diwakar and Pushkar's brother; Preeti's ex-lover; Vedika's husband (2013) (2013–2014)
- Prerna Bhatt as Vedika Gupta: Kailash's wife (2012–2014)
- Manish Khanna as Govardhan Kaneria: Ambika and Deepak's brother; Kamini's husband (2012–2014)
- Bharti Sharma as Kamini Kaneria: Govardhan's wife (2012–2014)
- Shreya Arora/Urmila Tiwari as Neha Gupta Kapur: Sushma and Pushkar's daughter; Naman's wife (2012–2013)
- Anubhav Krishna Srivastava as Naman Kapur: Shivam's brother; Neha's husband (2012–2013)
- Nandita Puri as Kaushalya Deewan: Anisha's elder sister; Puru's wife; Avantika, Anuj and Preeti's mother (2012–2014)
- Ashlesha Sawant as Preeti Deshpande: Kaushalya and Purushottam's daughter; Avantika and Anuj's younger sister; Kailash's ex-lover; Sameer's wife (2012–2014)
- Vijayendra Kumeria as Sameer Deshpande: Nirmala and Sadanand's son; Preeti's husband (2013–2014)
- Mehmood Junior as Shankar "Shanky" Chatterjee: Deewans' caretaker and Puru's aide (2012–2014)
- Meenkashi Sethi as Sukhmani Kumar: Harish and Sarika's mother (2012–2014)
- Yashashri Chiplunker as Payal Sharma: Sarika's daughter (2013–2014)
- Prateek Shukla as Shivam Kapoor: Naman's brother; Pankhuri's ex-fiancé (2012)
- Alefia Kapadia as Latika Bafna Deewan: Nisha's daughter; Aditya's ex-fiancé; Rubel's ex-wife (2012–2014)
- Priyanka Nayyar as Nisha Bafna: Latika's mother (2012–2013)
- Worship Khanna as Toby (2013)
- Nivaan Sen as Sahil (2013)
- Raj Singh Suryavanshi as Manan Modi: Kaira's ex-boyfriend (2013)
- Rajlaxmi Solanki as Nirmala Deshpande: Sadanand's wife; Sameer's mother; Kaushalya's nurse (2013–2014)
- Kuldeep Mallik as Sadanand Deshpande: Nirmala's husband; Sameer's father (2013–2014)
- Apurva Agnihotri as Vikram Dhanrajgir: Varun's brother; Amrita's husband (2014)
- Aleeza Khan as Amrita Dhanrajgir: Vikram's wife (2014)
- Kunickaa Sadanand as Aneesha James Waterson: Kaushalya's younger sister (2014)
- Anil Dhawan as Manik Deewan: Puru's younger brother; Manorama's husband; Kapil and Revati's father (2013)
- Suchitra Bandekar as Manorama Deewan: Manik's second wife; Kapil and Revati's step-mother (2013)
- Alekh Sangal as Kapil Deewan: Manik's son; Manorama's step-son; Revati's brother; Anuradha's husband (2013)
- Harsha Khandeparkar as Anuradha "Roshni" Deewan: Kapil's wife (2013)
- Sonali Nikam as Revati Deewan: Manik's daughter; Manorama's step-daughter; Kapil's sister (2013)
- Mridul Kumar Sinha as Mangal Goel, Sheela Deewan's elder brother (2014)
- Aparna Ghoshal as Nilofer Khan: Nafisa, Ayesha and Rukhsaar's mother (2014)
- Monica Murthy as Rukhsaar Khan: Nilofer's daughter; Ayesha and Nafisa's sister (2014)
- Divjot Sabarwal as Nafisa Khan: Nilofer's daughter; Ayesha and Rukhsaar's sister (2014)
- Preeti Singh as Mona: Intern; Employee (2014)
