= Sumrit Shahi =

Indian novelist and screenwriter (born 1993)

Sumrit Shahi; सुमृत शाही
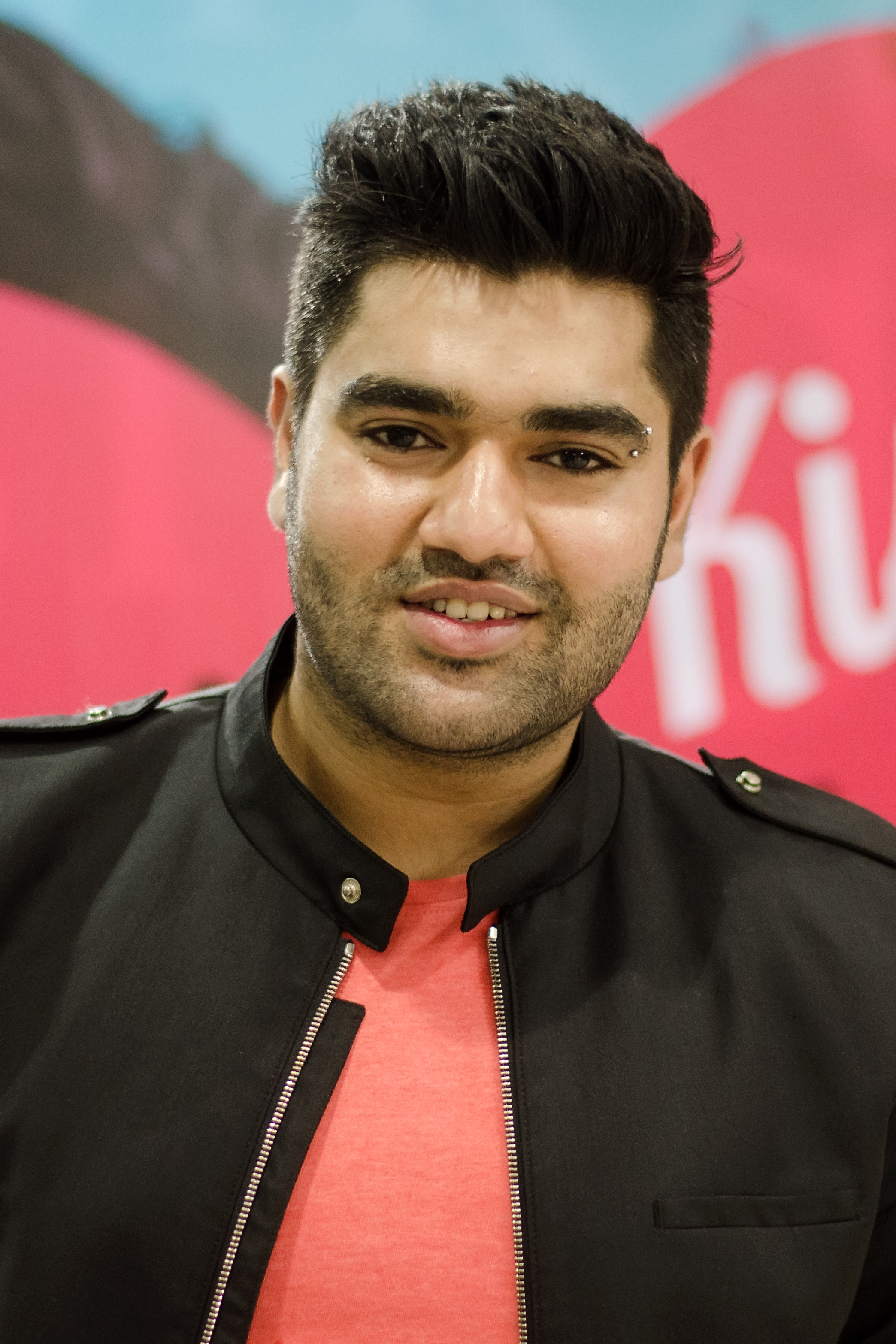
- Shahi at book launch of Never Kiss Your Best Friend in 2015
- Born: 12 February 1993 (age 33); Chandigarh, India
- Education: St. John's High School, SelaQui International School
- Alma mater: Symbiosis International University
- Occupations: Novelist, Scriptwriter, Motivational speaker, Freelance Journalist
- Writing career
- Years active: 2010–present
- Genres: Young adult fiction, Romance
- Notable works: Just Friends, A lot like love...a li'l like chocolate, Sadda Haq - My Life, My choice

Signature
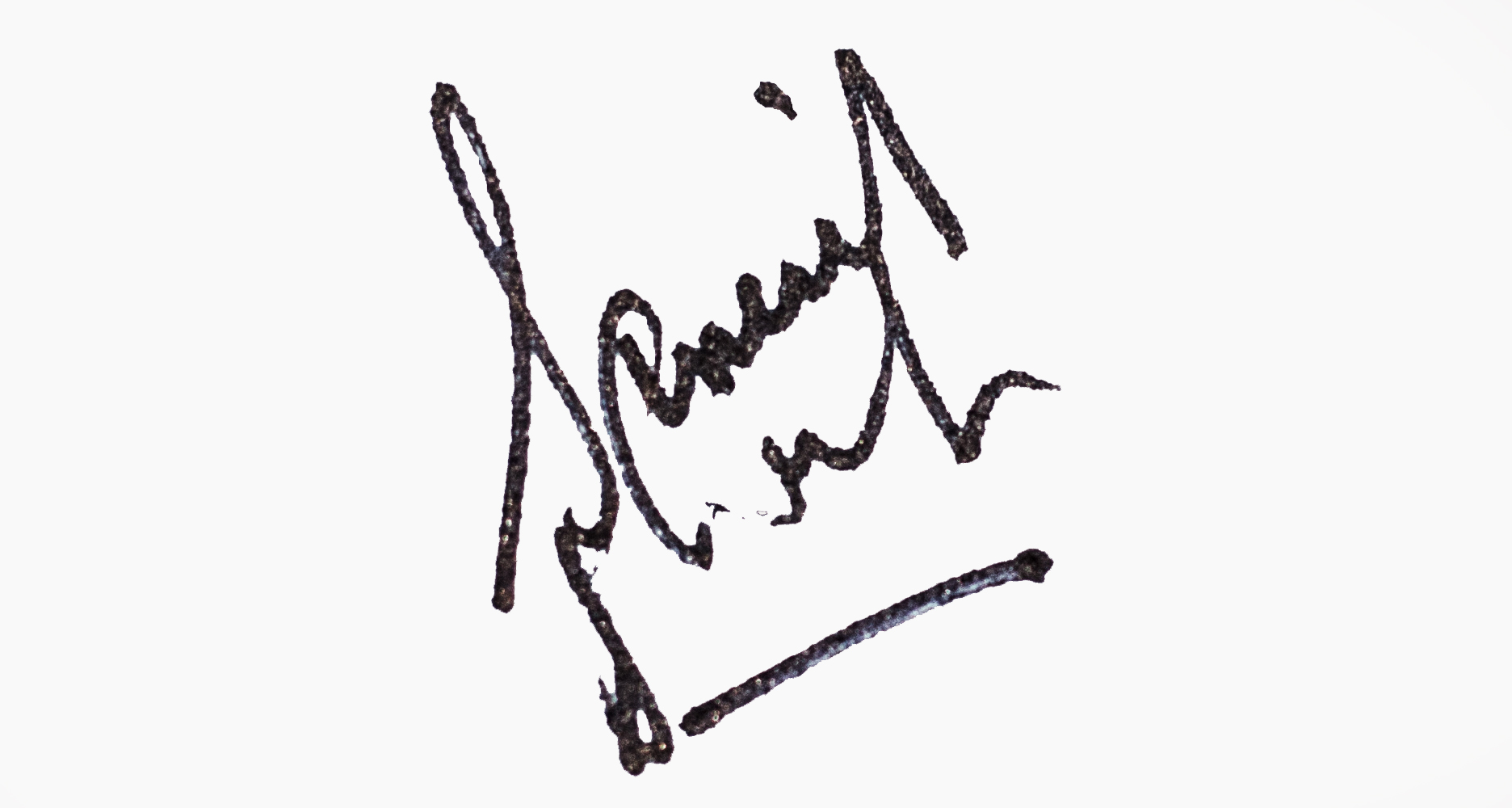

Sumrit Shahi (born 12 February 1993) is an Indian novelist and screenwriter. He has written 7 youth based television shows. This includes Sadda Haq - My Life, My Choice which aired on Channel V India and won the Youth show (fiction) category at Zee Gold Awards in 2014 and at Indian Telly Awards in 2014 and 2015, Million Dollar Girl - From Banaras to Paris also on Channel V India, Boyz on Big Magic entertainment, Twist Waala Love, Secret Diaries on Channel V, BIG F on MTV, and Pyar Tune Kya Kiya on Zing. He also has Ek Veer Ki Ardaas...Veera on Star Plus to his credit. He has written the screenplay for Tu Suraj Mein Saanjh Piya Ki on Star Plus. He has also written the screenplay for a web series called Black Coffee, and dialogues for another web series called Medically Yourrs for Alt Balaji.

He is the author of three novels, Just Friends, A lot like love...a li'l like chocolate and Never Kiss Your Best Friend, which has been adapted into a web series, Same title, streaming on Zee5. He wrote his first novel Just Friends at the age of 17. In 2015, he was chosen by Hindustan Times in the list of Top 30 under 30 young achievers in the country, terming him as a 'writing rockstar of the young'.

Sumrit is a TedX speaker.

== Personal life ==
Sumrit Shahi was born on 12 February 1993 into a family of builders, in Chandigarh, India. He studied till 10th grade at St. John's High School, Chandigarh. He further continued his education at SelaQui International School, Dehradun and finally finished his schooling from Bhavan Vidyalaya, Panchkula. He did his graduation in Liberal Arts from Symbiosis International University, Pune and majored in Media Studies with Film Appreciation and Business Management. He is currently based out of both Mumbai and Chandigarh.

== Career ==
Sumrit Shahi's Just Friends released in 2010 when he was seventeen and still studying in school. The novel was based on his observations of platonic relationships during teenage. It went on to become popular soon after. The novel was seen as a welcome change in the segment of heavy IIT induced literature.

In October 2011, his second novel, A lot like love...a li'l like chocolate was released. In his second novel Sumrit talked about practical relationships. The novel was appreciated for its dark humor and realistic take on the subject of love and relationships in contemporary times.

In the summer of 2012, Sumrit started working as a feature writer for The Daily Post, Chandigarh where he extensively covered celebrities, parties and launches. He also freelanced with India Today as a Business Profile writer, in the following months.

In August 2013, he ventured into television script writing starting with the youth-based show Sadda Haq - My Life, My Choice which airs on Channel V India, earlier he has also written the story for a show on Star Plus called Ek Veer Ki Ardaas...Veera. His third show, also an youth-based show named Million Dollar Girl - From Banaras to Paris too aired on Channel V India. Sumrit wrote his fourth show,"Boyz" for Big Magic Entertainment.

His third novel, Never Kiss Your Best Friend, under "Rupa Publications" released in May 2015. It has recently become a national bestseller. Shahi's novels have had a Hindi translation as well.

== Works ==
=== Novels ===
- Just Friends (2010)
- A lot like love...a li'l like chocolate (2011)
- Never Kiss Your Best Friend (2015)

=== Television shows ===
- Ek Veer Ki Ardaas...Veera (co-writer Durjoy Datta) (2012 - 2015)
- Sadda Haq - My Life, My Choice (co-writer Durjoy Datta) (2013 - 2016)
- Million Dollar Girl - From Banaras to Paris (co-writer Durjoy Datta) (2014 - 2015)
- Boyz (2015)
- Twist Waala Love (2015)
- Secret Diaries (2016)
- Big F ( 2017)
- Pyar Tune Kya Kiya (2017)
- Tu Suraj Mein Saanjh Piya ki (2018)

=== Web series ===
- Black Coffee (2017)
- Duck sey Dude (2018)
- Medically Yours (2019)
- Never Kiss Your Best Friend (2020)
- Bhalla Calling Bhalla ( 2020)
- Never Kiss Your Best Friend Lockdown Edition (2020)
- LSD: Love Scandal & Doctors (2021)
- Dev DD 2 (2021)
- Punchhbeat Season 2
- Girgit
- Never Kiss Your Best Friend season 2
- Fuh se fantasy season 2
- Ek Farzi love story

== Bibliography ==
- Smilyo (2014). BLAZE The Uprising! (PDF). Smilyo Educational Charitable Society ®.
