= Gold Awards =

Annual Indian television awards

- Awarded for: Excellence in Hindi Television
- Sponsored by: Boroplus (2007–2017); Kesh King (2018)
- Location: Mumbai, Maharashtra
- Country: India
- Presented by: Vikaas Kalantri
- First award: 2007
- Final award: 2019
- Website: http://www.goldawards.in

Television/radio coverage
- Produced by: Vikaas Kalantri

The Gold Awards is an annual awards show that honours the best performers in the Hindi-language television industry.

The awards are presented in various areas of excellence, such as popular programming, including music programmes, news, entertainment programmes, sports, travel, lifestyle and fashion; best television channel in a particular category including news, sports, music and entertainment; technical awards and popular awards. The event is managed and founded by Vikaas Kalantari.

== History ==
It is an annual Hindi television award show with many categories, including categories for Indian soap opera. The awards are presented for outstanding achievements, both in popular as well as technical branches such as television software and crafts. Initially the award show represented the best achievements of the year in the opinion of the TV industry. The voting was by industry workers right from the spot boys to actors, directors, writers and producers. Later, however, the voting system changed to an audience vote.

In the year 2007 and 2008, more than 300 TV and film personalities attended the event held in Mauritius and Dubai respectively.

== Editions ==
Year	Ceremony	Channel	Host
2007	1st Gold Awards	Zee TV	Aman Verma; Mandira Bedi
2008	2nd Gold Awards	Zee TV	
2010	3rd Gold Awards	Zee TV	
2011	4th Gold Awards	Zee TV	Ali Asgar; Suresh Menon; Disha Vakani; Dilip Joshi
2012	5th Gold Awards	Zee TV	
2013	6th Gold Awards	Zee TV	Karan Grover; Jayati Bhatia; Bharti Singh
2014	7th Gold Awards	Zee TV	Maniesh Paul; Surbhi Jyoti
2015	8th Gold Awards	Zee TV	
2016	9th Gold Awards	Zee TV	Jay Bhanushali; Gauahar Khan
2017	10th Gold Awards	Zee TV	Jay Bhanushali; Bharti Singh
2018	11th Gold Awards	Zee TV	Nakuul Mehta; Ali Asgar
2019	12th Gold Awards	Zee TV	Nakuul Mehta; Barkha Bisht; Paritosh Tripathi

== Categories ==
=== Popular Awards ===
- Best Actor in a Lead Role
- Best Actress in a Lead Role
- Best Onscreen Jodi
- Best Actor in a Negative Role
- Best Actress in a Negative Role
- Best Actor in a Supporting Role
- Best Actress in a Supporting Role
- Debut in a Lead Role Male
- Debut in a Lead Role Female
- Best Child Artiste Male
- Best Child Artiste Female
- Best Fiction Show of the Year

=== Critics Awards ===
- Best Actor in a Lead Role
- Best Actress in a Lead Role
- Best Actor in a Comic Role
- Best Actress in a Comic Role
- Best Actor in a Negative Role
- Best Actress in a Negative Role
- Best Actor in a Supporting Role
- Best Actress in a Supporting Role
- Stellar Performer of the Year Male
- Stellar Performer of the Year Female
- Face of the Year
- Best Anchor
- Best Director
- Best Youth Show of the Year
- Best Comedy Show of the Year
- Best Crime/Thriller Show of the Year
- Best Dance Talent Show of the Year

=== Special awards ===
- Gold Producer's Honor For Completing 1000 episodes
- Hall of Fame
- Scintillating Comeback on Indian Television
- Most Celebrated Standup Comedian on Indian Television
- Rising Film Stars from Indian Television
- Most Consistent TRP Gainer Show of The Year
- OTT Icon Of The Year

== See also ==
- Gold Glam and Style Awards
- Gold Comedy Awards
- List of Asian television awards
