= Anya Singh =

Indian actress

- Anya Singh in 2025
- Born: London, England
- Citizenship: Indian
- Education: Mayo College Girls School, Ajmer; Sri Venkateswara College, University of Delhi
- Occupation: Actress
- Years active: 2017–present

Anya Singh is an Indian actress from New Delhi, who primarily works in Hindi films and web series. She made her debut in a leading role with the musical drama film Qaidi Band (2017), directed by Habib Faisal, opposite Aadar Jain. She appeared in two seasons of the web series Never Kiss Your Best Friend (2020–2022) and in films including Kho Gaye Hum Kahan (2023) and Stree 2 (2024). In 2025, she played one of the lead roles as Sanya Ahmed, a talent manager, in Aryan Khan's Netflix series The Ba***ds of Bollywood.

== Early life ==
Singh was born in London and spent her early childhood there before moving to New Delhi at the age of five. She studied at Mayo College Girls School in Ajmer and later graduated from Sri Venkateswara College, University of Delhi. She trained in Odissi dance and participated in stage productions during her school and college years. In 2015, she moved to Mumbai to pursue a career in acting.

== Filmography ==
Films

Year	Title (Note: The films are listed in order of release date.)	Role	Notes	Ref.
2017	Qaidi Band	Bindiya Chadha		
2019	Ninu Veedani Needanu Nene	Madhavi/Diya	Telugu/Tamil film; voiced by Chinmayi	
2021	Velle	Riya		
2023	Kho Gaye Hum Kahan	Laxmi "Lala" Lalvani		
2024	Stree 2	Chitti		
2026	Border 2	Sudha Rawat		
2027	Beparwah	TBA		

Web series

Year	Title (Note: The films are listed in order of release date.)	Role(s)	Notes	Ref.
2019	Pyaar Actually	Sukanya		
2020	Never Kiss Your Best Friend (Season 1)	Tanie Brar		
2022	Kaun Banegi Shikharwati	Rajkumari Uma		
2022	Never Kiss Your Best Friend (Season 2)	Tanie Brar		
2023	Jee Karda	Preet Chuharmalani		
2025	The Ba***ds of Bollywood	Sanya Ahmed		

== Awards and nominations ==
Year	Award	Category	Work	Result	Notes	Ref.
2025	Bollywood Hungama OTT India Fest	Breakthrough Performer of the Year	The Ba***ds of Bollywood	Nominated		
2025	Bollywood Hungama OTT India Fest	Best Supporting Actor – Female [Original Series]	The Ba***ds of Bollywood	Won		
2025	Bollywood Hungama OTT India Fest	Breakthrough Performer of the Year - [Female]	The Ba***ds of Bollywood	Nominated		
