= Prateek Sharma =

Indian television producer, creative director, screenwriter

- Born: 24 November 1990 (age 35); Indore, Madhya Pradesh, India
- Education: Mass Media and Communication
- Occupation: Television producer
- Years active: 2016–present

Prateek Sharma (born 24 November 1990) is an Indian television producer, film producer and director, managing director and creative head of LSD Films.

== Career ==
Prateek Sharma joined Star Plus as executive producer and his first show was Pratigya, starring Pooja Gor and Arhaan Behl. He then went on to be an executive producer on Ek Hazaaron Mein Meri Behna Hai, Starring, Karan Tacker, Krystle DSouza, Nia Sharma and Kushal Tandon.

Prateek also worked on Saath Nibhana Saathiya, which had Devoleena Bhattacharjee playing the lead role of Gopi. The show ran for over 6 years. He the worked on Jaana Na Dil Se Door, starring Vikram Singh Chauhan. He quit Star Plus and went on to become the writer and showrunner of Sony Entertainment Television's Beyhadh, starring Jennifer Winget, Kushal Tandon and Aneri Vajani.

He founded his production house in 2017 and Launched his first show Ek Deewaana Tha on Sony Entertainment Television.

Moving in the horror genre, he produced episodic for &TV - Laal Ishq. Post Laal Ishq he produced another supernatural thriller for ZeeTV called Manmohini starring Ankit Siwach, Garima Rathore and Reyhna Pandit.

Post Manmohini, he went on to produce Sufiyana Pyaar Mera for Star Bharat with Helly Shah and Rajveer Shekhawat in the lead.

His latest production, on Colors, is called Bahu Begum. It stars Arjit Taneja, Samiksha Jaiswal and Diana khan.

He then worked on Beyhadh 2, the sequel to Beyhadh. It starred Jennifer Winget, Ashish Chowdhury and Shivin Narang. The show aired from 2 December 2019. It had an abrupt end due to the Coronavirus and lockdown.

== Television shows ==
The following is the list of television shows produced by Prateek Sharma under his banner LSD Films

Year	Title	Channel	Reference(s)
2016–2017	Beyhadh	Sony TV	
2017–2018	Ek Deewaana Tha	Sony TV	
2018–2020	Laal Ishq	And TV	
2018–2020	Manmohini	Zee TV	
2019	Sufiyana Pyaar Mera	Star Bharat	
2019–2020	Bahu Begum	Colors TV	
2019–2020	Beyhadh 2	Sony TV	
2021	Teri Meri Ikk Jindri	Zee TV	
2022–2024	Pyar Ka Pehla Naam: Radha Mohan	Zee TV	
2022–2024	Rabb Se Hai Dua	Zee TV	
2023–2024	Pyaar Ka Pehla Adhyaya: Shiv Shakti	Zee TV	
2024	Pukaar – Dil Se Dil Tak	Sony TV	
2024–2025	Suman Indori	Colors TV	
2024–2025	Jamai No. 1	Zee TV	
2025	Rishton Se Bandhi Gauri	Sun Neo	
2025–present	Tumm Se Tumm Tak	Zee TV	
2026–present	Oh Humnava Tum Dena Saath Mera	StarPlus	
