= Paaras Madaan =

Indian television actor

Paras Madaan
- Born: Delhi, India
- Education: Delhi University
- Occupations: Actor; Model
- Years active: 2008–present

Paras Madaan (born 9 March) is an Indian Actor, best known for playing Anwar in Qubool Hai, Samruddh Latkar in Ghum Hai Kisikey Pyaar Meiin, Rajeev Chandra in Beyhadh 2.

== In the media ==
Paras Madaan was a theatre artist from Delhi. Paras has also done many commercial ads with MTV, Tata, Nestle Eclairs before his debut in acting. Madaan debuted with Kis Desh Mein Hai Meraa Dil and later Keshav Pandit as a supporting actor. He became famous playing Anwar on Zee TV's long-running show Qubool Hai. He is also known for playing Sumit in Star Plus' Nisha Aur Uske Cousins replacing Tarun Singh.

== Television shows ==
- Nath – Rishton Ki Agnipariksha as Shiv Jeet Narayan
- Ghum Hai Kisikey Pyaar Mein as Samarth, Savi's fiancée (2023)
- Beyhadh 2 as Rajiv Chandra
- Divya Drishti as Scorpion
- ALTBalaji (Hero Varrdiwala) as Naveen
- Half Marriage (TV series) as Sidhath Singhania
- Laado 2 as Jai Dev
- Jaat Ki Jugni as Dr. Vikram
- Sarojini – Ek Nayi Pehal as Mayank
- Love by Chance as Mihir
- Nisha Aur Uske Cousins as Sumit
- Keshav Pandit
- Kis Desh Mein Hai Meraa Dil
- Qubool Hai as Aanwar
- Chandrakant Chiplunkar Seedi Bambawala
- Hamari Sister Didi
