= Parineeta Borthakur =

Indian actress and singer (born 1985)

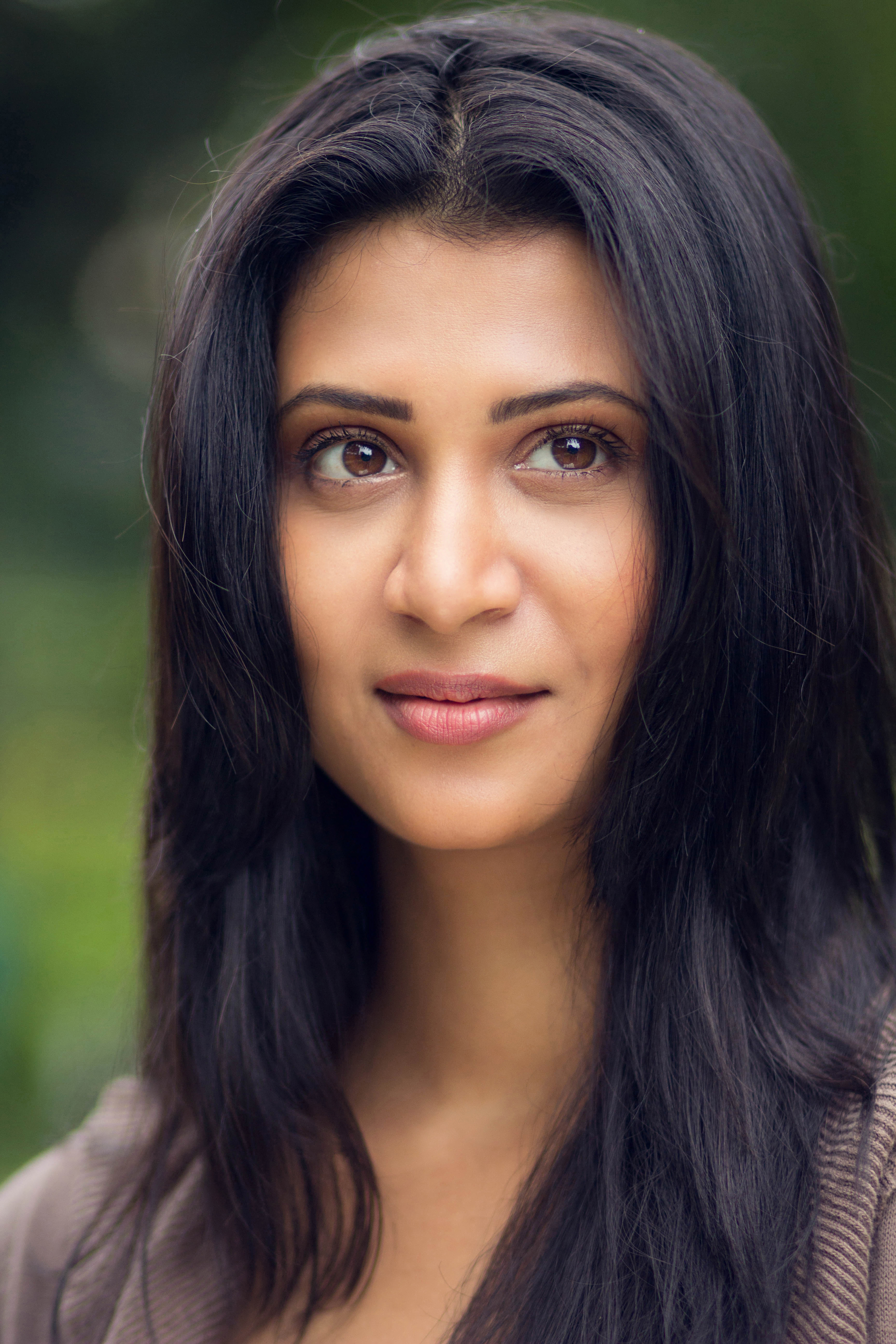
- Born: 21 February 1985 (age 41); Duliajan, Assam, India
- Occupations: Actress; singer; model
- Years active: 2001–present
- Known for: Bepannah; Gupta Brothers; Swaragini
- Spouse: Gautam Chakrabortty (m. 2011)
- Children: 1

Parineeta Borthakur is an Indian film and television actress and singer from Assam. She is known for playing Sharmishta Bose in Swaragini, Anjana Hooda in Bepannah and Ganga Shiv Gupta in Gupta Brothers. Her younger sister Plabita Borthakur is also a singer and actress.

== Career ==
Borthakur made her film debut with the Assamese film Nayak. Her first album was Parineeta, which was released in December 2006. Her first appearance on TV was in Pritam Pyare Aur Woh on SAB TV as Gogi. She also featured in Bollywood movies like Force, Chalo Dilli and Kurbaan. In 2015, she played the role of Sharmishta Bose in Colors TV's Swaragini. In 2017, she was seen in Zee TV's Ek Tha Raja Ek Thi Rani as Vasundhra Suryavanshi. In same year she starred in Assamese movie Gaane Ki Aane alongside Zubeen Garg.In 2018, she portrayed Anjana Hooda in Colors TV's Bepannaah.

In January 2020, she launched India's first vegan and paraben free highly pigmented lip plumpers, under the cosmetic brand- Nyor.

From October 2020 to January 2021, Borthakur was seen as the main female lead, Ganga Shiv Gupta, in Star Bharat's Gupta Brothers opposite Hiten Tejwani. In December 2020, StarPlus announced another Hindi remake of Pandian Stores titled Pandya Store produced by Sphere Origins, which premiered on 25 January 2021. With the launch of the second official Hindi remake of Pandian Stores, the first official Hindi remake, Gupta Brothers was announced to go off the air on 5 February. Mahesh Pandey's Gupta Brothers went off-air abruptly on 26 January, earlier than the announced date.

From March to September 2022, she portrayed the main antagonist in Ashvin Yardi's Spy Bahu on Colors. She also a played a villain character, Mandira Kashyap (formerly Gargi Rameshwar Sharma) in Zee TV's Pyaar Pehla Adyaya: Shiv Shakti by Prateek Sharma since July 2023 to until the show was pulled the plug on August 2024.

From September 2024 to January 2025, she was cast as Aarti Singh Rathore in Leena Gangopadhyay's Durga – Atoot Prem Kahani on Colors TV. The show ended shortly even before her main track was began.

Since July 2025, she replaced Nausheen Ali Sardar as matriarch Chandrika Singh Chauhan in Arvind Babbal's Vasudha on Zee TV as Sardar quit the show.

In November 2026, Borthakur made her devotional singing debut with Kanha Darshan. The soulful Krishna bhajan has music by Ashok Bhadra, is mixed and mastered by Gautam Chakrabortty (her husband), with video concept and direction by Rajesh Jashpal and lyrics penned by Rajiv Dutta.

== Filmography ==
=== Films ===
Year	Film	Role	Director	Language
2001	Nayak	Jonali	Munin Barua	Assamese
2004	Barood		Munin Barua	Assamese
2005	Borolar Sansar		Unknown	Assamese
2008	Saas Bahu Aur Sensex		Shona Urvashi	Hindi
2009	Kurbaan	Professor Vaishali	Rensil D'Silva	Hindi
2009	Jeevan Baator Logori		Timothy Das Hanche	Assamese
2011	Force	Maya's sister	Nishikanth Kamath	Hindi
2011	Chalo Dilli		Shashant Shah	Hindi
2011	Poley Poley Urey Mon	Pallavi	Timothy Das Hanche	Assamese
2016	Gaane Ki Aane	Madhumita	Rajesh Jashpal	Assamese
2018	The Underworld		Rajesh Jashpal	Assamese
2024	Bhool Bhulaiyaa 3	Arjun's mother	Anees Bazmee	Hindi

=== Television ===
Year	Title	Role	Notes	Ref.
2004	Lavanya	Gauri		
2006	Mamta	Anamika		
2009	Kashmakash Zindagi Ki	Pratima		
2009	Monica Mogre – Case Files	Monisha		
2013	Savdhaan India	Radha Rani		
2014	Pritam Pyare Aur Woh	Gogi		
2015–2016	Swaragini – Jodein Rishton Ke Sur	Sharmishtha Bose Gadodia		
2017	Ek Tha Raja Ek Thi Rani	Vasundhra Suryavanshi		
2018	Bepannah	Anjana Hooda		
2020–2021	Gupta Brothers	Ganga Gupta		
2022	Spy Bahu	Veera Nanda		
2023	Pyar Ka Pehla Naam: Radha Mohan	Gargi Sharma / Mandira Kashyap	Special appearance	
2023–2024	Pyar Ka Pehla Adhyaya: Shiv Shakti	Mandira Kashyap		
2024–2025	Durga – Atoot Prem Kahani	Aarati Singh Rathore		
2025–present	Vasudha	Chandrika Singh Chauhan		
