= Vaishali Takkar =

Indian actress (1992–2022)

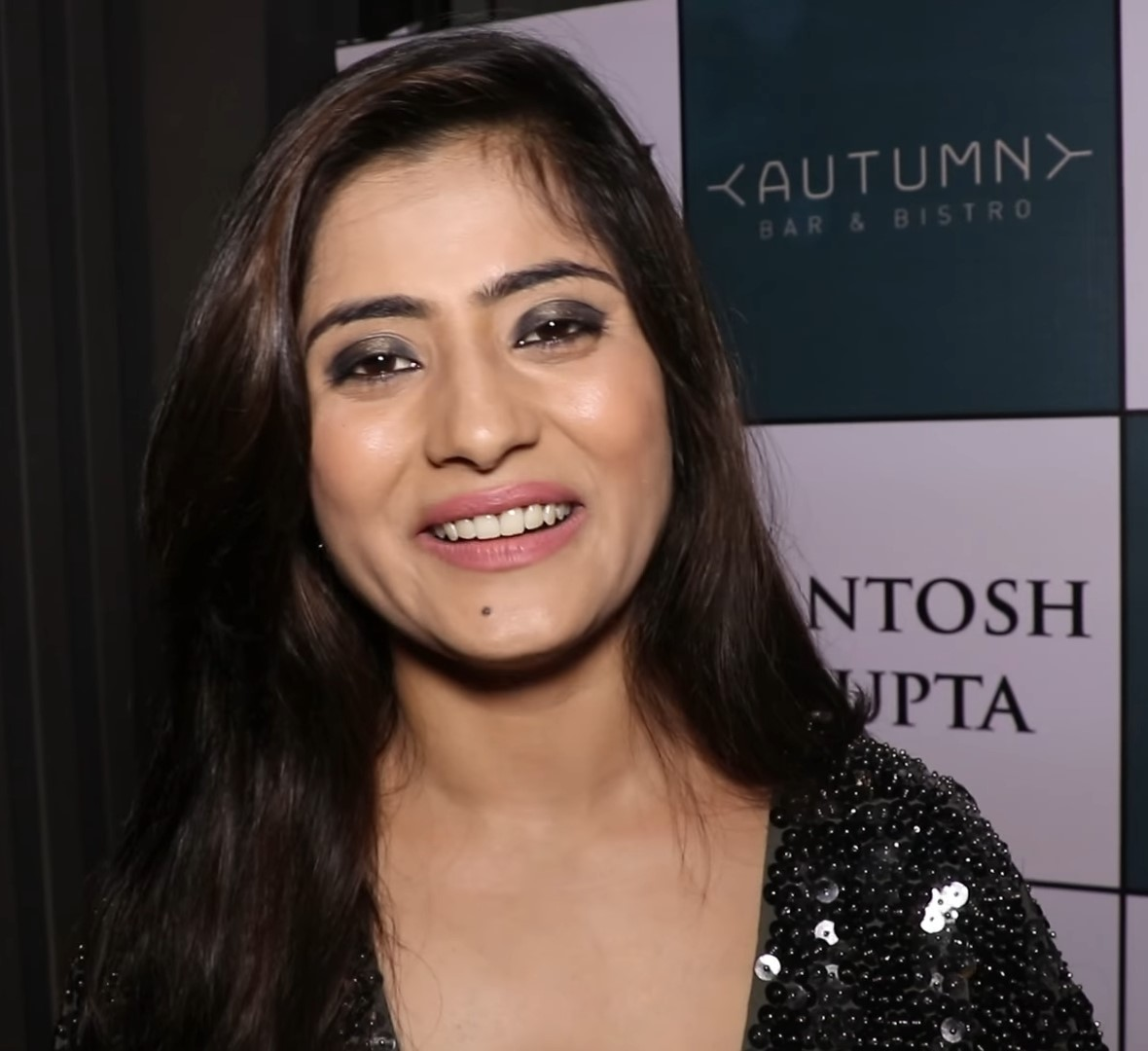
- Takkar in 2019
- Born: 15 July 1992; Ujjain, Madhya Pradesh, India
- Died: 15 October 2022 (aged 30); Indore, Madhya Pradesh, India
- Occupation: Actress
- Years active: 2015–2022
- Known for: Yeh Rishta Kya Kehlata Hai; Sasural Simar Ka

Vaishali Takkar (15 July 1992 – 15 October 2022) was an Indian television actress. She was known for her portrayal of Anjali Bharadwaj in Sasural Simar Ka and Sanjana in Yeh Rishta Kya Kehlata Hai.

== Early life ==
Vaishali Takkar was born on 15 July 1992 in Ujjain, Madhya Pradesh, as the elder of H.B Takkar and Annu Takkar's two children. She had a younger brother, Neeraj Takkar.

== Career ==
Takkar's debut television series was Star Plus's longest running drama Yeh Rishta Kya Kehlata Hai in which she played Sanjana from 2015 to 2016.

In 2016, she acted as Vrinda in Yeh Hai Aashiqui.

From August 2016 to December 2017, she portrayed Anjali Bharadwaj in Colors TV's Sasural Simar Ka opposite Sidharth Shivpuri and Rohan Mehra.

In 2018, she was cast as Shivani in SAB TV's Super Sisters.

Next, she enacted the role of Netra in Colors TV's Vish Ya Amrit: Sitara opposite Arhaan Behll.

From November 2019 to June 2020, Takkar portrayed Ananya/Mansi in Zee TV's Manmohini 2 alongside Karam Rajpal and Reyhna Malhotra.

== Personal life ==
Takkar got engaged to her boyfriend Dr. Abhinandan Singh from Kenya on 26 April 2021. Their wedding was scheduled for June 2021, but they cancelled a month after their engagement.

== Death ==
On 15 October 2022, Takkar committed suicide by hanging herself in her home in Tejaji Nagar, Indore, Madhya Pradesh. Her body was discovered by her father on 16 October 2022. A suicide note was found in her bedroom, stating that she had been harassed by her former boyfriend. Takkar's remains were cremated and her family donated her eyes before cremation.

== Television ==
Year	Serial	Role	Notes	Ref.
2015–2016	Yeh Rishta Kya Kehlata Hai	Sanjana "Sanju" Singh		
2016	Bhakton Ki Bhakti Mein Shakti	Shraddha	Episode 19	
2016	Yeh Vaada Raha	Simran		
2016	Yeh Hai Aashiqui	Vrinda	Episode: "Driver's Son"	
2016–2017	Sasural Simar Ka	Anjali "Anju" Bharadwaj		
2018	Super Sisters	Shivani Sharma		
2018–2019	Vish Ya Amrit: Sitara	Netra Singh Rathore		
2019	Laal Ishq	Juhi	Episode 118 - Raat Danav	
2019–2020	Manmohini 2	Ananya Mishra/Mansi		
2021–2022	Rakshabandhan	Kanak Shivraj Pratap Singh Thakur (Singhsaal)	Final Performance	
