= Shivashakti =

Shivashakti or Sivasakthi is a compound name in which Shiva is the identified masculine consciousness and Shakti is the identified feminine divine energy. It may refer to:

- Sivasakthi, a 1996 Indian Tamil-language film
- Shiv Shakti, a 1988 Indian Hindi-language film
- Sivasakthi (TV series), an Indian TV series
- Shiv Shakti – Tap Tyaag Tandav, an Indian TV series
- Pyar Ka Pehla Adhyaya: Shiv Shakti, an Indian TV series
- Sivasakthi Movie Makers, an Indian film company, established 1996
- Shivshakti Point, the lunar landing location of Chandrayaan-3's Vikram lander
- Sivasakthi Narayanan, Indian footballer
- Sivasakthy Ananthan, Sri Lankan politician
- Shivshakti Sachdev, Indian actress
- Shiv Shakti Temple, a Hindu temple in Bhagalpur, Bihar, India
