= Safarnama (TV series) =

- Genre: Non-fiction, Travel show
- Written by: Ashish Dubey
- Directed by: Ashish Dubey; Ishan Jacob
- Presented by: Ankit Siwach
- Composer: Umang Pandya
- Country of origin: India
- Original language: Hindi
- No. of seasons: 1
- No. of episodes: 9

Production
- Producers: Ashish Dubey; Ishan Jacob; Ankit Siwach
- Cinematography: Abhishek Kashyap
- Editor: Lokesh Mahajan
- Camera setup: Multi-camera
- Running time: 20 minutes
- Production company: Sinashh films

Original release
- Network: Epic
- Release: 3 August 2020

Safarnama (transl. Travelogue) is an Indian Hindi-language travel documentary television series produced by Sinashh Films that has aired on Epic TV since August 2020. The show is hosted by television actor Ankit Siwach and is based on his travel journey starting from Mumbai and ending in Ladakh, covering other parts of India in between.

== Episodes ==
- Episode 01 - Mumbai
- Episode 02 - Manali, Himachal Pradesh
- Episode 03 - Kullu
- Episode 04 - Kullu Part-02
- Episode 05 - Sarchu and Leh
- Episode 06 - Leh and Ladakh - 01
- Episode 07 - Leh and Ladakh - 02
- Episode 08 - Turtuk and Thang
- Episode 09 - Kargil

== Production ==
The show was produced by Sinashh films and Siwach, and was shot on location in the various places shown in the series through a road trip. Siwach relating himself as an avid traveler described the show as a personal journey he wanted highlight for viewers.

== Broadcast ==
It has aired in India on the Epic TV television channel and is also available on its online streaming service Epic ON.
