= Internet Wala Love =

Indian Hindi-language television drama show

- Genre: Drama; Romance
- Starring: Shivin Narang; Tunisha Sharma
- Theme music composer: Rahul Jain
- Opening theme: Internet Wala Love
- Composer: Raju Singh
- Country of origin: India
- Original language: Hindi
- No. of seasons: 1
- No. of episodes: 155

Production
- Producer: Sunjoy Waddhwa
- Running time: 20 minutes approx.
- Production company: Sphere Origins

Original release
- Network: Colors TV (2018–2019); Colors Rishtey (2019)
- Release: 27 August 2018 – 29 March 2019

Internet Wala Love (transl. Love via Internet) is an Indian Hindi-language television drama show which aired on Colors TV from 27 August 2018 to 8 March 2019 before shifting to Colors Rishtey and concluding there on 29 March 2019. Produced by Sunjoy Waddhwa under Sphere Origins, it starred Shivin Narang and Tunisha Sharma.

== Plot ==
Jai Mittal and Aadhya Verma live miles apart but are connected via social media. Completely extroverted Jai is a radio jockey at the Ishq FM radio channel. Introverted Aadhya works as scriptwriter and radio jockey on the same channel. Their paths keep crossing; they later strike an anonymous relationship via online chats. Aadhya falls in love with Jai who eventually realises his feelings too. Karan and Ragini Singh enter to destroy the Mittals for their sister Shruti's revenge, in the disguise as children of Aadhya's father's friend. Jai and Aadhya find out their true intentions. Jai learns about Shruti and is accused of ruining her life. Paralysed and non-responsive, she finally admits she'd falsely accused Jai. Karan and Ragini are forgiven. Jai and Aadhya hug each other and unite.

== Cast ==
=== Main ===
- Shivin Narang as Jai Mittal: Purushottam and Roopa's son, Samrat's cousin, Aadhya's love interest and boyfriend (2018–2019)
- Tunisha Sharma as Aadhya Verma: Shubhankar and Pratima's elder daughter, Diya's sister, Jai's love interest and girlfriend (2018–2019)

=== Recurring ===
- Jayati Bhatia as Roopa Mittal: Purushottam's wife, Jai's mother (2018–2019)
- Varun Badola as Shubhankar Verma: Pratima's husband, Aadhya and Diya's father (2018–2019)
- Anushka Sen / Simran Natekar as Diya Verma: Shubhankar and Pratima's younger daughter, Aadhya's sister, PK's girlfriend (2018–2019)
- Kanwar Dhillon as Samrat Murushottam Mittal (2018): Murushottam's son; Jai's cousin
- Minissha Lamba as Wedding planner Mahira Kapoor (2018)
- Pranav Misshra as Karan Singh: Magician; Shruti's brother; Ragini's husband (2019)
- Swati Kapoor as Ragini Singh: Karan's wife (2019)
- Unknown as Shruti Singh: Karan's sister; Jai's obsessed lover (2019)
- Susheel Parashar as Kulshottam Mittal: Patriarch of the Mittal family; Sarla's husband; Purushottam and Murushottam's father; Jai and Samrat's grandfather (2018–2019)
- Yamini Singh as Sarla Devi Mittal: Matriarch of the Mittals; Kulshottam's wife; Purushottam and Murushottam's mother; Jai and Samrat's grandmother (2018–2019)
- Abhinav Kapoor as Prem Kumar "PK" Mehta: Sushma's son, Savvy's brother, Diya's boyfriend (2019)
- Shweta Rastogi as Pratima Verma: Shubhankar's wife; Aadhya and Diya's mother (2018–2019)
- Asawari Joshi as Sushma Mehta: Roopa's friend, Savvy and PK's mother (2019)
- Sanjay Choudhary as Rajat Mehta: Jai's friend (2018–2019)
- Sagar Parekh as Vihaan "Lugaai" Malhotra: Jai's friend (2018–2019)
- Hetal Puniwala as Murushottam Mittal (2018)
- Preeti Gandwani as Sonali Mittal (2018)
- Krutika Deo as Savita "Savvy" Mehta (2018–2019)
- Poorti Arya as Tanisha Singh (2018)
- Puja Joshi as Aishwarya Nehra: Jai's former girlfriend and Aadhya's colleague (2018)
- Naveen Saini as Purushottam Kulshottam Mittal (2018–2019)

== Production ==
The show was produced by Sunjoy Waddhwa under the banner of Sphere Origins. The name was earlier decided to be E-Love but later, the makers titled the show Internet Wala Love. In March 2019, Narang announced that the show is going off-air.
