= Bhupinder Singh (actor) =

Former Indian television actor

Bhupendra Singh
- Born: 18 May 1969 (age 56); Kalagarh, Uttarakhand, India
- Occupations: Actor, Model
- Years active: 1996–2018
- Known for: Yeh Pyar Na Hoga Kam; Ek Hasina Thi

Bhupendra Singh (born 18 May 1969) is a former Indian actor. He has acted in popular TV serials like Yeh Pyar Na Hoga Kam, Ek Hasina Thi, Madhubala – Ek Ishq Ek Junoon, Rishton Ka Chakravyuh and Tere Sheher Mein, among many others.

In December 2023, he was charged with murder and was arrested by the Uttar Pradesh Police in Bijnor district. Singh allegedly shot dead his neighbor and injured three others. He was also charged with attempt to murder, voluntarily causing hurt, and under the Arms Act.

== Television ==
- Jai Mahabharat as Angraj Karna
- 1857 Kranti as Nana Sahib
- Yeh Pyar Na Hoga Kam as Triyogi Narayan Bajpayee
- Madhubala – Ek Ishq Ek Junoon as Shamsher Mallik
- Ek Hasina Thi as Dr. Dayal Thakur
- Tere Sheher Mein as Dev Agnihotri
- Kaala Teeka as Vishwaveer Jha
- Rishton Ka Chakravyuh as Dhirendra Pandey

== Filmography ==
Year	Film	Role	Language	Notes
1998	Sham Ghansham	Monty	Hindi	
1999	Thammudu	Rohit	Telugu	
2000	Annayya	Chinna Rao	Telugu	
2001	Devi Putrudu		Telugu	
2001	Bhalevadivi Basu	Anji	Telugu	
2001	Badri	Rohit	Tamil	
2002	Villain		Tamil	
2003	Villain		Telugu	
2003	Diwan		Tamil	
2004	Anji	Young Bhatia	Telugu	
2004	Shankar Dada M.B.B.S.	Pandu Dada	Telugu	
2008	Yuvvraaj	Daniel Mehta	Hindi	
2010	Soch Lo		Hindi	
