= Rishton Ka Chakravyuh =

Indian television series

- Genre: Soap opera; Drama
- Created by: Sanjot Kaur
- Story by: Niraj Shukla; Sanjot Kaur; Sheetal Ladha; Dialogues: Niraj Shukla; Amitosh Nagpal
- Directed by: Ashwini Chaudhary (Varanashi track); Sachindra Vatsa; Rajeev Raj
- Creative director: Nikita Parikha
- Starring: See below
- Music by: Amar Mohila; Raju Singh
- Country of origin: India
- Original language: Hindi
- No. of seasons: 1
- No. of episodes: 154

Production
- Producers: Bhupinder Singh; Sanjot Kaur
- Running time: 21 minutes
- Production companies: Rolling Pictures Productions; Private Limited

Original release
- Network: Star Plus
- Release: 7 August 2017 – 23 February 2018

Rishton Ka Chakravyuh (transl. Labyrinth of Relationships) is an Indian television drama series aired on STAR Plus. The show stars Mahima Makwana, Narayani Shastri, Rahul Ssudhir,Sangita Ghosh, Ankit Siwach and Ajay Chaudhary. Set against a royal backdrop, the show revolves around a mother, authoritative royal businesswoman Satrupa, and her 17-year-old free-spirited, confident daughter Anami. The show depicts the life of a royal, industrialist family that resides in Laal Mahal, the house of conspiracies. The show is loosely based on the story of Laal Mahal and depicts grey shades of relationships. The series ended on 23 February 2018.

== Plot ==
Seventeen-year-old Anami, abandoned at birth and adopted by a pandit family in Banaras, returns as the sole yet reluctant heir to a royal family in Laal Mahal in the Bihar badlands.

The tale begins with Satrupa bringing back Anami, whom she gave away at birth, to Laal Mahal after her son and Anami's twin brother Vatsalya's death. Reluctantly, Anami agrees to go back to Laal Mahal.

Adhiraj Pandey, the CBI officer who is handling the case of anything related to Lal Mahal, gradually develops a close bond with Anami, and the two become best friends. Slowly, Anami learns about the past of Laal Mahal and gets to know her dead brother through his diary. She decides to stay in Laal Mahal and find the true culprit behind her brother's death. Because Adhiraj is her best friend and actually loves her without knowing it, he helps her in any decision she makes without any reluctance. She also brings Sudha, her biological father's mistress and also the mother of Narottom, (Anami's half-brother) to Laal Mahal to make Narottom's life happy. She is unaware of Sudha's true motives who wants all the money, power and property of Lal Mahal.

=== Anami and Satrupa ===
Satrupa warns Anami for Sudha, but because of Anami's stubborn behavior and misconception about Satrupa, she never trusts her. At first, Anami trusts Sudha blindfolded but gradually Adhiraj suspects Sudha and tells Anami to watch out for her. Anami tries running away from Lal Mahal to live with her foster parents when her brother Laddo, who is the son of her foster parents, was kidnapped by Sudha's brother and her maternal uncle Purushottam. Adhiraj plans to go with her citing her safety, in order to spend more time with Anami. Neither Adhiraj or Anami wants to leave each other but Anami cannot stay in Lal Mahal. When Anami and Adhiraj, along with Laddo reach Anami's foster parents, they spend a night in one of her dad's friend's houses. Sudha gets the house on fire through people whom she had hired to work for her. Anami thinks it was Satrupa's plan and decides to return to seek revenge.

=== Adhiraj and Anami ===
Meanwhile, Adhiraj expresses his feelings for Anami. Anami seeks some time for her to discover her feelings for him. She gets to know Sudha's true motives when Adhiraj gets proof against her, which causes her to be imprisoned. Narottam provides the proof through a self-confessed audio recording. Anami knows that Satrupa is not guilty. In the end, Sudha is exposed and Anami asks Satrupa for forgiveness. Both share a huge hug and the whole family is happy. Baldev and Satrupa reunite. When Narottam was about to leave Laal Mahal, Anami asks the reason and he tells that because his mother and maternal uncle were involved in Vatsalya's accident, he has no right to stay with the family. Anami promises to keep the secret and asks him not to leave. Terms are settled between Baldev-Satrupa and Narottam. Anami tells Adhiraj about the accident and he makes Sudha confess her crimes. Adiraj and Anami bring Madhu and Murari Pathak to Laal Mahal. Satrupa requests them to stay with them at Laal Mahal.

Seeing the closeness between Anami and Adhiraj Dhiru, Pandey (Adhiraj's father) gets Adhiraj transferred. Learning this, Baldev, along with Gayatri (his mother) meets Pandey and asks for forgiveness for all their deeds and offers friendship. Baldev accepts Narottam and he agrees to stay. Gayatri invites the Pandey family for dinner and everyone shares a happy time until they come to a huge shock. Vatsalya comes into Lal Mahal calling Satrupa (Maa). Everyone is shocked including Anami. The series ends on a cliffhanger with Anami and Vatsalya's face.

== Episodes ==
| No. overall | No. in season | Title | Original release date |
|---|---|---|---|
| 1 | 1 | "The Story of Anami" | 7 August 2017 |
| 2 | 2 | "A Plot To Kill Vatsalya" | 8 August 2017 |
| 3 | 3 | "Vatsalya Is Attacked!" | 9 August 2017 |
| 4 | 4 | "Pujan Singh Instigates Vatsalya" | 10 August 2017 |
| 5 | 5 | "Vatsalya Meets with an Accident" | 11 August 2017 |
| 6 | 6 | "Will Satrupa Pull The Trigger?" | 12 August 2017 |
| 7 | 7 | "Anami Is Attacked!" | 13 August 2017 |
| 8 | 8 | "Time To Bring Anami Home?" | 14 August 2017 |
| 9 | 9 | "Satrupa Visits Murari's House" | 16 August 2017 |
| 10 | 10 | "Satrupa Meets Anami" | 17 August 2017 |
| 11 | 11 | "Will Satrupa Fight For Anami?" | 18 August 2017 |
| 12 | 12 | "Satrupa Brings Anami Back!" | 19 August 2017 |
| 13 | 13 | "Avdhoot Or Anami?" | 21 August 2017 |
| 14 | 14 | "Anami Does The Unthinkable!" | 22 August 2017 |
| 15 | 15 | "Baldev Won't Accept Anami" | 23 August 2017 |
| 16 | 16 | "Pujan Plots Against Anami" | 24 August 2017 |
| 17 | 17 | "Anami Creates a Scene" | 25 August 2017 |
| 18 | 18 | "Pujan Singh Is Afraid" | 26 August 2017 |
| 19 | 19 | "Adhiraj Questions the Family" | 28 August 2017 |
| 20 | 20 | "Anami is Adamant" | 29 August 2017 |
| 21 | 21 | "Satrupa, Anami Asked to Leave!" | 30 August 2017 |
| 22 | 22 | "Pujan Singh Confronts Satrupa" | 31 August 2017 |
| 23 | 23 | "Anami Breaks the Fast?" | 1 September 2017 |
| 24 | 24 | "Satrupa Seeks Adhiraj's Help" | 2 September 2017 |
| 25 | 25 | "Anami, Pujan Singh Clash" | 3 September 2017 |
| 26 | 26 | "Narottam Makes a Revelation" | 4 September 2017 |
| 27 | 27 | "Pujan Manipulates Satrupa" | 5 September 2017 |
| 28 | 28 | "Anami Falls Sick" | 7 September 2017 |
| 29 | 29 | "Vikramaditya in Trouble" | 8 September 2017 |
| 30 | 30 | "Anami Vows to Protect Narottam" | 9 September 2017 |
| 31 | 31 | "Baldev to Sign the DNA Papers?" | 11 September 2017 |
| 32 | 32 | "Anami's Got a Plan" | 13 September 2017 |
| 33 | 33 | "Anami Tricks the Doctor" | 14 September 2017 |
| 34 | 34 | "The Verdict Shocks Anami" | September 2017 |
| 35 | 35 | "Anami Has an Escape Plan" | 15 September 2017 |
| 36 | 36 | "Anami Remembers Vatsalya" | 16 September 2017 |
| 37 | 37 | "Return of Anami, the Avenger!" | 18 September 2017 |
| 38 | 38 | "A Grand Welcome for Anami" | 19 September 2017 |
| 39 | 39 | "Special Ritual for Anami" | 20 September 2017 |
| 40 | 40 | "Anami's New Tantrum" | 21 September 2017 |
| 41 | 41 | "Satrupa Warns Anami" | 22 September 2017 |
| 42 | 42 | "Anami's Secret Outing?" | 23 September 2017 |
| 43 | 43 | "Anami Meets Narottam's Mum" | 25 September 2017 |
| 44 | 44 | "Anami's Heroic Act" | 26 September 2017 |
| 45 | 45 | "Anami Gets Caught!" | 27 September 2017 |
| 46 | 46 | "Satrupa Threatens Anami" | 28 September 2017 |
| 47 | 47 | "What's Anami's IQ?" | 29 September 2017 |
| 48 | 48 | "Anami Accuses Narottam" | 30 September 2017 |
| 49 | 49 | "Anami Gets a Tutor" | 2 October 2017 |
| 50 | 50 | "Anami Agrees to go to College" | 3 October 2017 |
| 51 | 51 | "Anami's First Day in College" | 4 October 2017 |
| 52 | 52 | "Anami is in a Dilemma" | 5 October 2017 |
| 53 | 53 | "Adhiraj's Serious Accusations" | 6 October 2017 |
| 54 | 54 | "Will Satrupa Help Dhiru Win?" | 7 October 2017 |
| 55 | 55 | "Anami Humiliates Satrupa" | 9 October 2017 |
| 56 | 56 | "Anami Feels Betrayed" | 10 October 2017 |
| 57 | 57 | "Anami's Life at Risk" | 11 October 2017 |
| 58 | 58 | "Anami is Trapped Again" | 12 October 2017 |
| 59 | 59 | "Anami Romances Adhiraj!" | 13 October 2017 |
| 60 | 60 | "Adhiraj Has a Shocking News!" | 16 October 2017 |
| 61 | 61 | "Anami Gets Trained" | 17 October 2017 |
| 62 | 62 | "Anami to Mind Her Business" | 18 October 2017 |
| 63 | 63 | "Anami Gets Her Way" | 19 October 2017 |
| 64 | 64 | "Poonam in Danger!" | 20 October 2017 |
| 65 | 65 | "Shocker for Anami" | 23 October 2017 |
| 66 | 66 | "Anami Welcomes the Goddess" | 24 October 2017 |
| 67 | 67 | "Anami's Life in Danger" | 25 October 2017 |
| 68 | 68 | "Sudha Enters Lal Mahal!" | 26 October 2017 |
| 69 | 69 | "Satrupa Slaps Anami" | 27 October 2017 |
| 70 | 70 | "Satrupa Humiliates Sudha" | 30 October 2017 |
| 71 | 71 | "Pujan Insults Sudha" | 31 October 2017 |
| 72 | 72 | "Adhiraj's Shocking Revelation" | 1 November 2017 |
| 73 | 73 | "Anami Has a Task to Finish" | 2 November 2017 |
| 74 | 74 | "Pujan Punishes Narottam" | 3 November 2017 |
| 75 | 75 | "Vikramaditya Confronts Sudha" | 6 November 2017 |
| 76 | 76 | "Anami Questions Sudha!" | 7 November 2017 |
| 77 | 77 | "Satrupa Breathes Fire!" | 8 November 2017 |
| 78 | 78 | "Can Satrupa Change Anami's Mind?" | 9 November 2017 |
| 79 | 79 | "Adhiraj, Anami's Chai Date" | 10 November 2017 |
| 80 | 80 | "Satrupa Reaches Benaras" | 13 November 2017 |
| 81 | 81 | "Surprise for Anami" | 14 November 2017 |
| 82 | 82 | "Sudha Slaps Narottam" | 15 November 2017 |
| 83 | 83 | "Satrupa Influences Ladoo" | 16 November 2017 |
| 84 | 84 | "Will Sudha Kill Gayatri?" | 17 November 2017 |
| 85 | 85 | "Satrupa Provokes Anami" | 20 November 2017 |
| 86 | 86 | "Satrupa, Gayatri's Plan Succeeds" | 21 November 2017 |
| 87 | 87 | "Can Anami Make Sudha Leave?" | 22 November 2017 |
| 88 | 88 | "Will Sudha's Secret be Exposed?" | 23 November 2017 |
| 89 | 89 | "Anami's Secret Mission" | 24 November 2017 |
| 90 | 90 | "Satrupa Warns Sudha" | 27 November 2017 |
| 91 | 91 | "Anami Tests Sudha!" | 28 November 2017 |
| 92 | 92 | "Satrupa Charms Narrotam" | 29 November 2017 |
| 93 | 93 | "Anami Doubts Narottam" | 30 November 2017 |
| 94 | 94 | "Anami's Request to Vikramaditya" | 1 December 2017 |
| 95 | 95 | "Will Anami Accept the Deal?" | 4 December 2017 |
| 96 | 96 | "Double Trouble for Anami" | 5 December 2017 |
| 97 | 97 | "Ladoo Knows Sudha's Plan" | 6 December 2017 |
| 98 | 98 | "Ladoo is Kidnapped!" | 7 December 2017 |
| 99 | 99 | "Adhiraj Finds a Major Lead" | 8 December 2017 |
| 100 | 100 | "Anami Receives a Parcel" | 11 December 2017 |
| 101 | 101 | "Satrupa Consoles Anami" | 12 December 2017 |
| 102 | 102 | "Satrupa Baits Purushottam" | 13 December 2017 |
| 103 | 103 | "Satrupa Rescues Ladoo" | 14 December 2017 |
| 104 | 104 | "Satrupa Does the Unexpected" | 15 December 2017 |
| 105 | 105 | "Satrupa Keeps It a Secret" | 18 December 2017 |
| 106 | 106 | "Anami Finds a Clue" | 19 December 2017 |
| 107 | 107 | "Satrupa is Heartbroken" | 20 December 2017 |
| 108 | 108 | "Anami Risks Her Life" | 21 December 2017 |
| 109 | 109 | "Sudha Does the Unthinkable!" | 22 December 2017 |
| 110 | 110 | "Ladoo Loses His Voice" | 25 December 2017 |
| 111 | 111 | "Will Anami's Plan Work?" | 26 December 2017 |
| 112 | 112 | "Anami Gets Kidnapped?" | 27 December 2017 |
| 113 | 113 | "Sudha Plans Against Ladoo" | 28 December 2017 |
| 114 | 114 | "Sudha Fails in Her Plan" | 29 December 2017 |
| 115 | 115 | "Anami Tricks Satrupa" | 1 January 2018 |
| 116 | 116 | "Anami's Bold Decision" | 2 January 2018 |
| 117 | 117 | "Anami's Escape Plan" | 3 January 2018 |
| 118 | 118 | "Anami, Ladoo's Escape Plan" | 4 January 2018 |
| 119 | 119 | "Adhiraj Finds Anami" | 5 January 2018 |
| 120 | 120 | "Anami, Adhiraj on the Run" | 8 January 2018 |
| 121 | 121 | "Will Satrupa Find Anami?" | 9 January 2018 |
| 122 | 122 | "Anami on the Run" | 10 January 2018 |
| 123 | 123 | "Anami Meets Madhu, Murari" | 11 January 2018 |
| 124 | 124 | "A Shocker for Anami" | 12 January 2018 |
| 125 | 125 | "Anami to Avenge Satrupa" | 15 January 2018 |
| 126 | 126 | "Anami, Adhiraj Part Ways" | 16 January 2018 |
| 127 | 127 | "Satrupa's Mannat Puja" | 17 January 2018 |
| 128 | 128 | "Anami Lies to Satrupa" | 18 January 2018 |
| 129 | 129 | "Sudha Doubts Anami" | 19 January 2018 |
| 130 | 130 | "Sudha Tests Anami" | 22 January 2018 |
| 131 | 131 | "Love Blooms for Adhiraj-Anami" | 23 January 2018 |
| 132 | 132 | "Adhiraj is Arrested" | 24 January 2018 |
| 133 | 133 | "Dhiru Lashes out at Satrupa" | 25 January 2018 |
| 134 | 134 | "Satrupa's Unexpected Move" | 26 January 2018 |
| 135 | 135 | "Anami Accuses Satrupa" | 29 January 2018 |
| 136 | 136 | "Adhiraj's Sweet Surprise" | 30 January 2018 |
| 137 | 137 | "Anami Bakes for Adhiraj" | 31 January 2018 |
| 138 | 138 | "Anami Decides to Forget Adhiraj" | 1 February 2018 |
| 139 | 139 | "Adhiraj Expresses His Love" | 2 February 2018 |
| 140 | 140 | "Is Anami in Love?" | 5 February 2018 |
| 141 | 141 | "Anami's Confused Feelings" | 6 February 2018 |
| 142 | 142 | "Madhu Talks to Anami" | 7 February 2018 |
| 143 | 143 | "Happy Birthday, Anami!" | 8 February 2018 |
| 144 | 144 | "Anami in High Heels" | 9 February 2018 |
| 145 | 145 | "Avdhoot Conspires Against Anami" | 12 February 2018 |
| 146 | 146 | "Anami Meets Madhu" | 13 February 2018 |
| 147 | 147 | "Anami's Birthday Look" | 14 February 2018 |
| 148 | 148 | "Anami Confesses Her Feelings" | 15 February 2018 |
| 149 | 149 | "A Shocker on Anami's Birthday" | 16 February 2018 |
| 150 | 150 | "Sher Singh Reveals the Truth" | 19 February 2018 |
| 151 | 151 | "A Shocker For Sudha" | 20 February 2018 |
| 152 | 152 | "Sudha Gets Arrested" | 21 February 2018 |
| 153 | 153 | "Anami Learns Vatsalya Was Killed" | 22 February 2018 |
| 154 | 154 | "Vatsalya is Alive!" | 23 February 2018 |

== Cast ==
=== Main cast ===
- Mahima Makwana as Anami Baldev Singh: Murari and Madhu's adopted daughter, Baldev and Satrupa's estranged daughter, Vaatsalya's twin, Lakshya's elder sister
- Narayani Shastri as Satrupa Baldev Singh: Baldev's wife; Anami and Vaatsalya's mother
- Sangita Ghosh as Sudha: Baldev's former lover & Narottam's Mother
- Ankit Siwach as CBI officer Adhiraj Pandey

=== Recurring cast ===
- Anju Mahendru as Gayatri Singh: Baldev's mother; Pujan's Aunt; Anami and Vatsalya grandmother
- Ram Gopal Bajaj as Vikramaditya Singh: Anami and Vatsalya grandfather; Pujan's Uncle Head of Lal Mahal and Royal Steel; Gayatri's husband; Baldev's father
- Ajay Chaudhary as Baldev Vikram Singh: Satrupa's husband; Anami, Vatsalya and Narottam's father; Pujan's cousin
- Payal Nair/Vibhuti Thakur as Daamo: Satrupa's assistant and confidant (2017)(2018)
- Bhupinder Singh as Dhirendra Pandey (Dhiru): Adhiraj and Tanya's father
- Akash Gill as Narottam: Baldev's illegitimate son
- Praneet Bhat as Pujan Singh: Baldev's cousin
- Karishma Kapur as Kamini: Pujan's wife
- Ieshaan Sehgal as Avdhoot Pratap Singh: Pujan and Kamini's son
- Vaishnavi Rao as Tanya Pandey: Adhiraj's Sister
- Tom Alter as Somdev Guruji
- Mohit Chauhan as Pandit Murari Pathak: Anami's foster father
- Lubna Salim as Madhu Pathak: Anami's foster mother
- Vineet Kumar Chaudhary as Purushottam: Sudha's Brother
- Devyansh Tapuria as Lakshya "Ladoo" Pathak: Anami's foster brother
- Sanyukta Timsina as Ila: Adhiraj's assistant at CBI office
- Shristhi Mitra as Poonam: Anami's assistant
- Devarshi Shah as Vatsalya Baldev Singh: Baldev and Satrupa's son, Anami's biological twin brother

== Production ==
=== Development and premiere ===
On 3 August 2016 an article published stating Mahima Makwana and Narayani Shastri being part of the show. On 17 July 2017 the first promo of the show was released on Mahima's Instagram. After that, a series of promos featuring Anami was released with #AnamiEkTsunami on Star Plus web pages. The show produced by Bhupinder Singh and Sanjot Kaur under the banner of Rolling Pictures is a Political, Family Drama loosely based on the story of Mahabharat and depicts grey shades of relationships. The show premiered at 6:00 p.m.(IST) on Monday 7 August 2017 and airs from Monday to Friday. Later on, the show shifted to 8:00 pm.(IST) prime time.

=== Casting ===
Main cast of Rishton Ka Chakravyuh
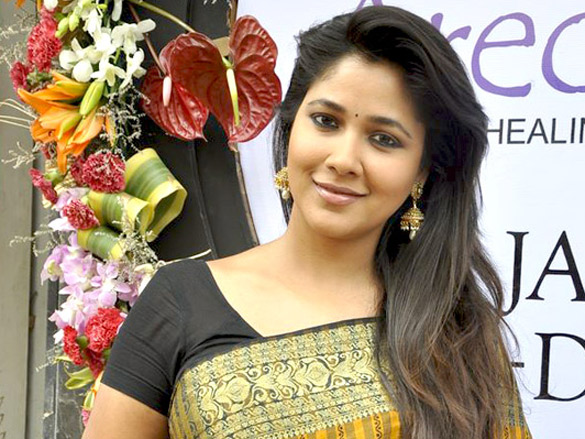
Narayani Shastri

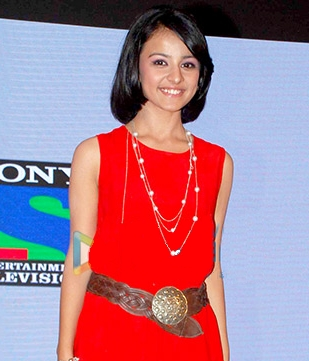
Mahima Makwana

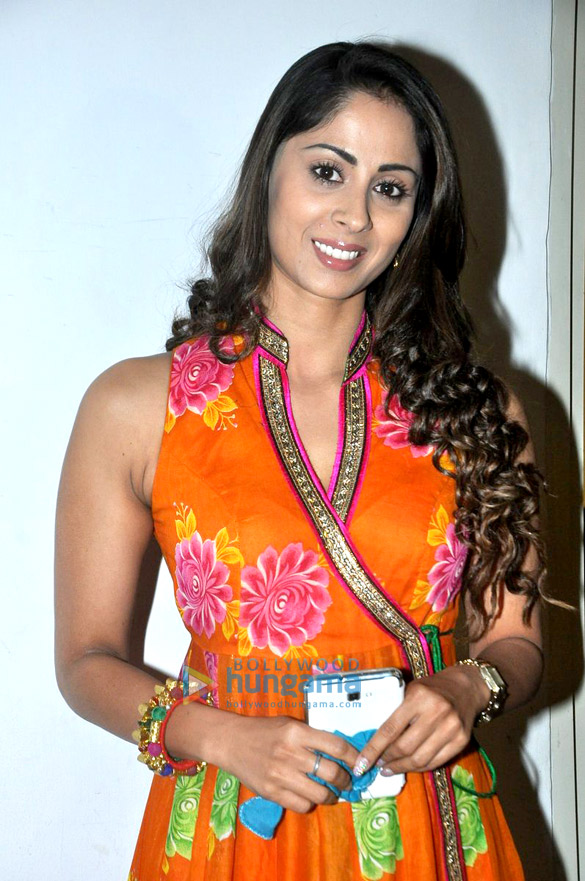
Sangita Ghosh

Praneet Bhat

Actresses, Mahima Makwana and Narayani Shastri were chosen to play the role of Anami and Satrupa respectively. Talking about her character Narayani said, "Satarupa is a sophisticated royal woman. She is a strong woman with a mind of her own and I am enjoying playing the same". Mahima, who has to wear a wig of Dreadlocks in the show said, "Which female actress on TV has adorned jattas? It a herculean task to move around and do action scenes with this heavy wig. I always like trying out different things, so it's fun and people are also giving me a positive feedback". Actress, Sangita Ghosh of ' Kehta Hai Dil Jee Le Zara fame, was cast to play Sudha. Newcomer Ankit Siwach landed in role opposite Mahima Makwana. Actor Akash Gill was chosen to play effeminate Character. Initially, Seema Pahwa was cast as Anami's mother. The role ultimately went to Lubna Salim. Actor Benjamin Gilani was earlier cast as Vikramaditya Singh but was replaced by Ram Gopal Bajaj before the release. The other Prominent casts include Ajay Chaudhary, Lubna Salim, Anju Mahendru, Devrshi Shah, Praneet Bhat among others.

== Awards and nominations ==
| Year | Award | Category | Nominee | Result |
|---|---|---|---|---|
| 2017 | ITA Award | ITA Award for Best Actor – Female | Mahima Makwana, Narayani shastri | Nominated |
| 2017 | ITA Award | ITA Award for Best Actor – Drama | Narayani shastri | Nominated |
| 2017 | ITA Award | ITA Award for Best Actress in a Negative Role | Sangita Ghosh | Nominated |
| 2017 | ITA Award | ITA Award for Best Actor – Male | Ajay Chaudhary | Nominated |
| 2017 | ITA Award | ITA Award for Best TV Show | Rishton Ka Chakravyuh | Nominated |

== Soundtracks ==
=== Series Soundtrack ===
| No. | Title | Singer | Length |
|---|---|---|---|
| 1. | "SAM DAM DAND BHED" | Kailash Kher | 3:30 |

=== Satrupa Vatsalya track ===
| No. | Title | Singer | Length |
|---|---|---|---|
| 1. | "ALVIDA – D DAY song (2013)" | Nikhil D'Souza, Sukhvinder Singh, Shruti Hassan, Loy Mendonsa | 5:01 |

- Note: small track between mother and son, in episode 6.

=== Anami and Madhu Pathak track ===
| No. | Title | Singer | Length |
|---|---|---|---|
| 1. | "AISA KYUN MAA" | Sunidhi Chauhan | 3:40 |

- Note: Small track daughter thinking about her foster mother, in episode 23.

=== Adhiraj and anami track ===
| No. | Title | Singer | Length |
|---|---|---|---|
| 1. | "hawayein" | Arijit Singh | 4:51 |
| 2. | "Tum Tak" | Javed Ali, Keerthi Sagathia, Pooja Vaidyanath | 5:31 |
