= Oh Humnava Tum Dena Saath Mera =

Indian drama television series

- Genre: Romance; Drama
- Created by: Prateek Sharma
- Developed by: Satish Rajwade
- Directed by: Yogesh Pundhir; Prateek Shah; Dharminder Kumar
- Starring: Sriti Jha; Shabir Ahluwalia
- Theme music composer: Saif Ali
- Opening theme: "Deewana Tera" by Javed Ali; Lyrics: Shivam Mishra
- Composer: Nishant Pandey
- Country of origin: India
- Original language: Hindi
- No. of seasons: 1
- No. of episodes: 197

Production
- Producers: Prateek Sharma; Parth Shah
- Cinematography: Suhas Rao
- Camera setup: Multi-camera
- Running time: 20 minutes
- Production company: Studio LSD Private Limited

Original release
- Network: StarPlus
- Release: 20 April 2026 – present

Oh Humnava - Tum Dena Saath Mera (transl. Oh my soulmate, please stay by my side) is an Indian Hindi-language romantic drama television series that premiered on 20 April 2026 on StarPlus and streams digitally on JioHotstar. Produced by Prateek Sharma under Studio LSD Private Limited, the series stars Sriti Jha and Shabir Ahluwalia. It is an official remake of Star Pravah's Marathi series Man Dhaga Dhaga Jodte Nava.

== Premise ==
Aparajita Sharma faces social stigma as a divorcee after leaving an abusive marriage to Lalit Shrimali. She meets Rakshit Bharadwaj, a businessman, and the two later marry.

== Cast ==
=== Main ===
- Sriti Jha as Aparajita "Appu" Sharma Bharadwaj: Malti and Ramgopal's elder daughter; Avinash and Aradhya's sister; Lalit's ex-wife; Rakshit's wife (2026–present)
- Shabir Ahluwalia as Rakshit Bharadwaj: A businessman; Arvind and Sudha's elder son; Vivaan's brother; Ira's ex-fiancé; Aparajita's husband (2026–present)

=== Recurring ===
==== Bharadwaj family ====
- Nishigandha Wad as Sudha Bharadwaj: Arvind's wife; Rakshit and Vivaan's mother (2026–present)
- Sandeep Kapoor as Arvind Bharadwaj: Sudha's husband; Rakshit and Vivaan's father (2026–present)
- Gaurav Wadhwa as Vivaan Bharadwaj: Sudha and Arvind's younger son; Rakshit's brother; Aradhya's husband (2026–present)
- Aishwarya Raj Bhakuni as Aradhya "Aaru" Sharma Bharadwaj: Malti and Ramgopal's younger daughter; Aparajita's sister; Vivaan's wife (2026–present)
- Manisha Purohit as Sheela Bharadwaj: Mohit's mother; Reva's grandmother (2026–present)
- Aman Sharma as Mohit Bharadwaj: Sheela's son; Raveena's ex-husband; Reva's father (2026–present)
- Anaya Bhati as Reva Bharadwaj: Raveena and Mohit's daughter (2026–present)

==== Sharma family ====
- Prasad Athlaye as Ramgopal Sharma: Malti's husband; Avinash, Aparajita and Aradhya's father (2026–present)
- Shruti Gholap as Malti Sharma: Ramgopal's wife; Avinash, Aparajita and Aradhya's mother (2026–present)
- Lokit Phulwani as Avinash Sharma: Malti and Ramgopal's son; Aparajita and Aradhya's brother; Rashmi's husband (2026–present)
- Neha Agarwal as Rashmi Sharma: Aparajita's best friend; Avinash's wife (2026–present)
- Lata Shukla as Buaji: Ramgopal's sister (2026–present)

==== Shrimalis ====
- Utkarsha Naik as Chandrabhaga Shrimali: Lalit's mother (2026)
- Manoj Chandila as Lalit Shrimali: A criminal; Chandrabhaga's son; Aparajita's abusive ex-husband (2026)

==== Others ====
- Sambhabana Mohanty as Raveena: Mohit's ex-wife; Reva's mother (2026-present)
- Tanya Sharma as Ira: Rakshit's ex-fiancée (2026)
- Nandini Thakur as Isha (2026)
- Maitri Sawkar as Pramila: Rohan's mother (2026)
- Manish D Verma as Rohan: Pramila's son; Aradhya's ex-fiancé (2026)
- Ashish Singh as Inspector Naveen: Rakshit's childhood friend (2026–present)
- Shanu Rao as Mansi (2026–present)
- Sumit Arora as Dubey: Rakshit's right hand man (2026–present)
- Sanjay Shejwal as Shashank: Aparajita's friend (2026)
- Micckie Dudaaney as Param (2026)
- Divyansh Jha as Kunal (2026)
- Shabana Khan as Prabha (2026)
- Rajesh Ganesh Sharma:

=== Guest appearances ===
- Neha Harsora as Sailee Jadhav Deshmukh from Udne Ki Aasha (2026)
- Kanwar Dhillon as Sachin Deshmukh from Udne Ki Aasha (2026)

== Production ==
=== Casting ===
Sriti Jha and Shabir Ahluwalia were cast as Aparajita and Rakshit. The series marked the second collaboration between Jha and Ahluwalia, after Kumkum Bhagya (2014–2021). Tanya Sharma was signed to play the negative lead. Gaurav Wadhwa and Aman Sharma were selected to portray Rakshit's brothers, Vivaan and Mohit Bharadwaj respectively. Manoj Chandila was cast as Lalit. Prasad Athqalye and Shruti Gholap also joined the show as Ramgopal and Malti Sharma. In June 2026, Utkarsha Naik joined the cast as Chandrabhaga. Micckie Dudaaney was cast in a supporting role. After Tanya Sharma quit the show, Aishwarya Raj Bhakuni's character Aradhya turned the negative lead of the show.

=== Release ===
In March 2026, StarPlus unveiled a teaser introducing the new show titled Oh Humnava Tum Dena Saath Mera, featuring Sriti Jha and Shabir Ahluwalia.

== Reception ==
Positive early viewer reactions to the premiere were reported, particularly to the chemistry between Jha and Ahluwalia. In its opening week, the show recorded a BARC TRP of 1.1 in week 16 of 2026 and then held at 0.9 for several weeks. Its rating rose to 1.0 in week 22 and stayed at that level until week 24.

== Awards and nominations ==
Year	Award	Category	Recipient	Result	Ref.
2026	Indian Television Academy Awards	Best Supporting Actress - Drama - TV	Nishigandha Wad	Pending	
2026	Indian Television Academy Awards	Best Negative Performance - TV	Aishwarya Raj Bhakuni	Pending	
2026	Indian Television Academy Awards	Best Art Director - TV	Akhil Raut	Pending	
2026	Indian Television Academy Awards	Best Costume Designer - TV	Nisha Bedi	Pending	
2026	Indian Television Academy Awards	Best Music Composer - TV	Nishant Pandey	Pending	
