= Manmohini =

2018 Indian thriller drama television series

- Created by: Prateek Sharma
- Developed by: Prateek Sharma
- Written by: Akash Deep; Shilpa Susheel; ShilpaDmello; Sharad; Prakriti Mukherjee
- Directed by: Prateek Shah; Ranjeet Gupta
- Creative director: Avhiroop Mazzumdar
- Country of origin: India
- Original language: Hindi
- No. of seasons: 2
- No. of episodes: 361

Production
- Producers: Prateek Sharma; Suman Sharma
- Production locations: Rajasthan, India
- Camera setup: Multi-Camera
- Running time: approx. 21 minutes
- Production company: LSD Films Private Limited

Original release
- Network: Zee TV
- Release: 27 November 2018 – 22 July 2020

Manmohini is a Hindi supernatural romantic television series created by Prateek Sharma under LSD Films. It replaced Kaleerein in its timeslot. it aired from November 2018 through July 2020 on Zee TV for two seasons.

During Season 1, the series featured Reyhna Malhotra, Giaa Manek, Ankit Siwach and Garima Singh Rathore in lead roles. Its second season was broadcast in 2019, starring Reyhna Malhotra, Karam Rajpal and Vaishali Takkar.

== Plot ==
For five hundred years, a witch named Mohini has been waiting to fulfill her unrequited love for Rana Saa. Her desires are triggered as he is reborn as Ram. Ram is a businessman who lives with his wife, Siya, and his half brother, Vivian. The couple are on the verge of divorce. However, when Siya learns of Mohini, she decides not to divorce Ram to save him.

=== 500 years ago ===
Rana Saa is married to Rajrajeshwari. Mohini, a maid in their palace, is in love with Rana. One day, Mohini tricks him into getting wounded by rival warriors who are "defeated" by Mohini's black magic. After being saved by Mohini, Rana promises to help her whenever she needs him. Mohini confesses that she is pregnant with his child and reveals that they had gotten intimate in an attempt to save his life. Rana, shocked and ridden with guilt, approaches a pregnant Rajrajeshwari, confesses his mistake and asks her to leave him. Mohini reveals her true nature and slits Rajrajeshwari's throat. Rana immediately takes her to the temple and begs the priestess to save their child. When the child is born, Rajrajeshwari warns Mohini that in every birth there will be a devoted wife to Rana's reincarnation who will free him from her clutches. She dies shortly afterward.

=== Present day ===
In the present day, Siya attempts to save Ram from Mohini. Meanwhile, Mohini tricks Ram into spending a night with her in exchange for saving Siya from her black magic. Ram reluctantly agrees and asks Mohini to never come into their lives again. Siya's life is saved, and life seemingly returns to normal.

=== Five years later ===
Ram and Siya now live a happier life, though they struggle to conceive a child. A 5-year-old boy comes into their lives under mysterious circumstances, and they decide to adopt him and name him Mann. He is seen possessing dark powers and begins to create misunderstandings between Ram and Siya. Over time, he is revealed to be Mohini and Ram's child, whom she has intentionally sent to wreak havoc in their lives. After discovering the truth, Siya decides to keep Mann and make him human to remove his dark powers. Mohini kills a pregnant Siya and Ram at the same time.The series ends when Mohini gets killed.

== Cast ==
=== Season 1 ===
==== Main ====
- Reyhna Malhotra/Giaa Manek as Mohini/Gopika, a 500 year old Chudail, Rana Saa's obsessed lover, Mann's mother (2018-2019) / (2019)
- Ankit Siwach as Rana Bhanupratap Singh, Mohini's lover (2019)/Ram Sisodia, Siya's husband, Mann and Amar's father (2018-2019)
- Garima Singh Rathore as Siya Sisodia, Ram's wife, Amar's mother and Mann's adoptive mother (2018-2019)

==== Recurring ====
- Nikita Sharma as Rani Rajrajeshwari, Rana Saa's wife (2019)
- Rakhi Sawant as Chakwa, a Chudail, Mohini's sister (2019)
- Vaidik Poriya as Mann Sisodia, Ram and Mohini's son, Siya's adoptive son (2019)
- Sonia Singh as Makdi Rani, Mohini's best friend turns her enemy (2019)
- Vandana Pathak as Devki Dai (Dai Maa), Ram's protector / D.K. a Chudail (2018-2019)
- Zuber K. Khan as Vanraaj, a superhuman and Siya's obsessed lover (2019)
- Sharain Khanduja as Jhumari, Vanraaj's lover (2019)
- Neeta Mohindra as Saroj Devi, Ram and Vivian's grandmother (2018)
- Abhimanyu Chaudhary as Vivian, Ram's half-brother (2018)
- Melanie Nazareth as Ram's stepmother and Vivian's mother (2018)
- Rupal Patel as Kubarjra / Usha (2019)
- Poonam Chaudhary as Moha (2019)
- Kanishq Rupani as Madhira (2019)
- Ratnakar Nadkarni as RaajpurohitJi (2018)
- Krishna Kant Singh Bundela as Tantrik

=== Season 2 cast ===
==== Main ====
- Karam Rajpal as Shiv/Mann Sisodia - Ram and Mohini's son, Siya's adoptive son (2019-2020)
- Reyhna Malhotra as Sunanda - an evil Chudail (2019-2020)
- Vaishali Takkar as Ananya Mishra/Mansi (2019-2020)

==== Recurring ====
- Buneet Kapoor as Amar Sisodia, Ram and Siya's son, Mann's younger brother (2020)
- Zaara Khan as Ketki Mishra, Ananya's sister (2019-2020)
- Lata Shukla as Parvati, Ananya's grandmother (2019-2020)
- Rakesh Paul as Kamal, Sunanda's husband (2019-2020)
- Rajesh Ganesh Sharma as Girija Shankar, Manmohini's Jijaji (2019-2020)

== Production ==
The production and airing of the show was halted indefinitely in late March 2020 due to the COVID-19 pandemic. Because of the outbreak, the filming of television series and films was postponed on 19 March 2020 and was expected to resume on 1 April 2020. The series was last broadcast on 24 March 2020 when the remaining episodes were aired. It was intended to end in April 2020 but had to be postponed due to the pandemic.

The show resumed on 14 July 2020 with brand new episodes, ending on 22 July 2020.
