= Kull: The Legacy of the Raisingghs =

2025 Indian television series

- Genre: Drama thriller
- Written by: Althea Kaushal
- Directed by: Sahir Raza
- Starring: Nimrat Kaur; Amol Parashar; Ridhi Dogra
- Music by: Sanchit Choudhary
- Country of origin: India
- Original language: Hindi
- No. of episodes: 8

Production
- Producers: Ekta Kapoor; Shobha Kapoor; Bal Singh; Gagan Anand; Tanveen Dugal; Avnit Chadha; Kuljit Chadha
- Camera setup: Multi-camera
- Running time: 30–37 minutes
- Production companies: Balaji Digital; 9pm films

Original release
- Network: JioHotstar
- Release: 2 May 2025

Kull: The Legacy of the Raisingghs is a 2025 Indian Hindi-language drama thriller television series directed by Sahir Raza and written by Althea Kaushal. Created by Ekta Kapoor and Shobha Kapoor under Balaji Digital and produced by 9pm films, it stars Nimrat Kaur, Amol Parashar and Ridhi Dogra. The series premiered on 2 May 2025 on JioHotstar.

== Cast ==
- Nimrat Kaur as Indrani Raisinggh
- Amol Parashar as Abhimanyu Raisinggh
- Ridhi Dogra as Kavya Raisinggh
- Ankit Siwach as Bhagwan Sharad Ramteke
- Rohit Tiwari as Jograaj
- Arslan Goni as Kabir
- Gaurav Arora as Brij Raisinggh
- Vikram Sakhalkar as Abhay Mathur
- Rahul Vohra as Chandra Pratap Raisinggh
- Tarun Chaturvedi as Veer
- Kuldeep singh panwar as Inspector Mannu
- Rohan Singh as Constable Chand
- Rivaan Gajbhiye as Young Abhimanyu

== Production ==
The series was announced on JioHotstar. 9pm films shot the series in Bikaner, Rajasthan. Filming took place in Laxmi Niwas Palace.

== Release ==
The series was made available to stream on JioHotstar on 2 May 2025.

== Reception ==
Santanu Das writing for Hindustan Times gave the series 2 out of 5 stars. Deepa Gahlot of Rediff.com awarded the series 2 1/2 out of 5 stars.
