= Beyhadh 2 =

Indian television series

- Genre: Romance; Thriller; Revenge
- Created by: Prateek Sharma
- Screenplay by: Shilpa F D'Mello
- Story by: Prakriti Mukherjee
- Directed by: Prateek Shah
- Creative director: Ameeta Devadigga
- Starring: Jennifer Winget; Shivin Narang; Ashish Chaudhary
- Theme music composer: Rahul Jain
- Opening theme: "Chaha Tujhe Dilne Mere"
- Composers: Mukul Puri; Elvis Nishant
- Country of origin: India
- Original language: Hindi
- No. of seasons: 1
- No. of episodes: 86

Production
- Producer: Prateek Sharma
- Editors: Amit Singh; Vinay Mandal
- Camera setup: Multi-camera
- Running time: 25 minutes approx.
- Production company: LSD Films Pvt Ltd

Original release
- Network: Sony Entertainment Television
- Release: 2 December 2019 – 31 March 2020

Related
- Beyhadh

Beyhadh 2 (transl. Extreme 2) is an Indian revenge television drama series which aired from 2 December 2019 to 31 March 2020 on Sony Entertainment Television. It starred Jennifer Winget, Shivin Narang and Ashish Chaudhary.

== Plot ==
Maya Jaisingh, internationally best-selling author, plans to destroy her biggest enemy Mrityunjay "MJ" Roy, to avenge the atrocities committed by him 10 years ago. She plans to get revenge from those who betrayed her using Rudra and Rishi, MJ’s sons.

Maya starts by saving Rishi from drowning, who falls for her while she tricks Rudra to accept her offer to publish her latest book, Beyhadh. Rudra takes an instant dislike to Maya. Elsewhere Maya manipulates Rishi to propose to her. Rudra's business partner, Ananya, loves him, but he considers her only as a friend.

MJ's facade of a loving husband is exposed when he threatens and mistreats Antara. He invites Rudra's investor to his Masquerade party, but Rajiv Chandra, Maya's accomplice, introduces himself as the investor, saving Maya. Elsewhere, Rudra falls for Maya after she helps him get his company's share from MJ. It is revealed that MJ had an affair with Rudra's girlfriend. Thus he hates him.

Maya urges Rishi to ask MJ regarding their wedding, but he refuses to listen. Maya takes advantage of it and tricks Rishi into slitting his wrist to convince MJ of their wedding. Rishi does so and dies. MJ vows to kill Rishi's murderer but kills Myra, who was Manas's girlfriend. Maya sees MJ occasionally and is constantly frightened as she recognised his footsteps, but she tries to remain strong to avenge herself. Later, MJ asks Rudra and Ananya to marry. Elsewhere, Maya plans to kill him and tricks him into following her to Rishikesh. Maya and Rudra realise their love for each other and tie the wedding knot. The Roys were left shocked when he introduces Maya as his wife.

Later, Maya recalls her nasty past (10 years ago) wherein Manvi Singh (Maya's original identity) was betrayed by MJ, whom she had an affair with and promised to marry. Still, after learning she is pregnant, he tortured her with his partners (which resulted in her miscarriage) and threw her into a muddy pit, but she still survives. Manvi was close with Antara, Diya and Aamir, but they betrayed her and helped MJ ruin Manvi’s life. MJ also killed Maya's brother Manas with the help of goons, leaving Nandini to suffer from amnesia who gained consciousness after 7 years.

Back in the present, Maya knocks outs Diya and traps MJ to send her to a mental hospital. Later, MJ gets evidence confirming that Maya is Rishi's murderer. He gives the same to Rudra. Later, MJ and Maya shoot each other.

=== Few days later ===
Maya is shown to be suffering from memory loss and meets a psycho stranger Vikram Jaisingh, who wants to get her, but she doesn't recognize him. Vikram gets some edited photos in Maya's house and claims to be her husband.

Later, it is revealed that it was Vikram who saved Manvi and took her to his house. Then, Vikram proposes marriage which she accepts but only gets a new "Maya Jaisingh". So, after their marriage, she escapes with important papers. She finds Nandini and helps her start a new life. She becomes a writer whose books becomes internationally famous for the next 3 years. In between, she meets Rajeev Chandra (whose company was destroyed by MJ) to devise her revenge.

At present, Rudra vows to kill Maya and is constantly searching for her. Vikram kills Rajeev. Later, frustrated by Vikram, Nandini cuts her wrist and dies, helping Maya recover her memories, and she decides to manipulate Vikram to defeat MJ and reunite with Rudra.

== Cast and characters ==
=== Main ===
- Jennifer Winget as Maya Rudra Roy (née Jaisingh) / Manvi (née Singh) : A writer who plans to destroy MJ, who had betrayed her and killed her unborn child and her brother, Manas, in the past. She was saved by Vikram Jaisingh, but she deceives him after their wedding. Following her deadly plots, Maya kills Rishi but falls in love with Rudra and marries him (2019–2020)
- Ashish Chaudhary as Mritunjay "MJ" Roy: A womanizing and selfish business tycoon with multiple affairs. He deceived Manvi in the past and killed her unborn child which transformed her into Maya Jaisingh and she returned to destroy him (2019–2020)
- Shivin Narang as Rudra Roy: An independent businessman who runs his own company, Ruan Publications. He hates his dad because of his affairs. He falls in love with Maya and marries her (2019–2020)

=== Recurring ===
- Rajat Verma as Rishi Roy: Antara and MJ's younger son who falls in love with Maya after she saves him from drowning, unaware of her agenda. She kills him and avenges the death of her unborn child (2019–2020)
- Ankit Siwach as Vikram "Vicky" Jaisingh: Maya's stalker. In the past he had saved Manvi who lost her memory and named her Maya Jaisingh, proposing her for marriage. However, she betrays him on the wedding day. He kills Rajeev and Nandini and supports Maya against MJ (2020)
- Kangan Nangia as Ananya Dutt: Rudra's business partner and one-sided lover. She starts hating him after he marries Maya. (2019–2020)
- Preeti Mehra as Nandini Singh: Maya and Manas's mother. After MJ betrayed Manvi and killed Manas, she suffered from amnesia for seven years. Maya helped her recover and lies that her husband and Manas abandoned them and lives in the United States. Later, she cuts her wrist and dies because of Vikram. (2019–2020)
- Melanie Nazareth as Antara Roy: MJ's wife. She is addicted to drugs using which MJ keeps threatening her. She helped MJ ruin Manvi's life in the past and thus faces Maya's wrath. She is aware of MJ's affairs but instead blames herself and her addiction for it (2019–2020)
- Nikunj Malik as Dr. Diya Mehta: MJ's girlfriend. In the past, she helped MJ abort Manvi's unborn child. Diya finds out she is pregnant with MJ but him and Antara force her to have an abortion and thus she seeks Maya’s help and also apologises to what she did in the past but instead Maya sends her to a mental hospital for the entire life. (2019–2020)
- Paaras Madaan as Rajeev Chandra: Maya's close friend and computer expert. He also serves as Maya's accomplice and partner-in-crime. MJ had destroyed Rajeev's company. So, he supports Maya against MJ but died in the process (2019–2020)
- Hasan Zaidi as Aamir Abdullah: MJ's business partner and family friend. He often lives in Roy Mansion and helps MJ in his personal-cum-professional life. He helped MJ ruin Manvi's life. So, he is on Maya's hitlist. (2019–2020)
- Rupa Divetia as Nilanjana Roy: MJ's mother. She hates him for his selfish and womanizing personality She is addicted to alcohol. After Rishi's demise she leaves Roy Mansion blaming MJ for his death and goes to London. (2019–2020)
- Manish Verma as Ankit: Rishi's friend and MJ's accomplice. MJ asked him to kidnap Rishi's girlfriend and he kidnaps Maya but dies in the process. (2019–2020)
- Gurpreet Sachdev as Nargis Abdullah: Aamir's wife and MJ's accomplice. (2019)
- Unknown as Jogi: MJ's personal driver. He helped in destroying Manvi's life and thus is on Maya's hitlist. (2019-2020)
- Yajuvendra Singh as Sudhir Dutt: MJ's business partner and Ananya's father. He helped in killing Manvi's unborn child and thus is on Maya's hitlist. (2020)
- Diana Khan as Myra Mehra: Manas's girlfriend and Maya's accomplice. After Manas was killed by MJ, she started hating him. So, after Rishi's death, she gives her sacrifice by claiming herself to be his girlfriend to save Maya from MJ. (2020)
- Vishal Malhotra as Aditya Roy: Rudra and Rishi's cousin, an investigative journalist. (2020)
- Venkatesh Singh as Manas Singh: Manvi's brother and Myra's boyfriend who was killed by MJ. (2020)
- Ahmad Harhash as Veer Singhdosh who was killed by MJ. (2020)

== Production ==
Beyhadh 2 is a spiritual successor of 2016 series of Beyhadh starring Jennifer Winget, Kushal Tandon, Aneri Vajani The first promo was released on 1 October 2019, featuring Winget as Maya Jaisingh.

Talking about the show, Winget said, "In Beyhadh, Maya was looking for love and was hungry for Arjun's attention. But in Beyhadh 2, Maya is back with an agenda and she has hatred in her mind. Everyone wanted to know, who Maya is in the first season but now everyone is aware of the lengths Maya can go to get her things done".

Due to the COVID-19 lockdown in India, on 20 April 2020, the show was cancelled by the channel along with two other shows, Patiala Babes and Ishaaron Ishaaron Mein. A producer, Prateek Sharma, conceded to the network's actions, describing them as being "in the best interest of all the concerned parties, including producer, actors, writers and the rest of the crew". In a statement to Times of India, the channel stated that production on the shows stopped in March, due to the COVID-19 pandemic. They noted that the Beyadh 2 narrative was "time-bound", and the Covid delay made it difficult for the network to finish telling the series' story to the end.

== Reception ==
Times Of India stated, "The plot of the show is intriguing and fast-paced. The sequence of events is well-aligned and it makes for an interesting watch. What stands apart is the outstanding cinematic visuals, something that the viewers were also a witness to in the first season. The background score adds to the mystery element".

== Soundtracks ==
No.	Title	Singer(s)	Length
1.	"Chaha Tujhe Dil Ne Mere"	Rahul Jain	4:50
2.	"Chaha Tujhe - Female Version"	Jennifer Winget	1:29

== See also ==
- List of programs broadcast by Sony Entertainment Television
