= Yeh Pyar Na Hoga Kam =

Indian television drama series

- Genre: Drama
- Developed by: Deepak Panth
- Written by: Jay Verma; Rajita Sharma
- Directed by: Nitin Jindal; Sunand Baranwal
- Creative directors: Rajita Sharma; Shantanu Agrawal
- Starring: See below
- Voices of: Harshwardhan Dixit
- Opening theme: "Yeh Pyar Na Hoga Kam"
- Country of origin: India
- Original language: Hindi
- No. of seasons: 1
- No. of episodes: 161

Production
- Producers: Dheeraj Kumar; Zuby Kochchar
- Production location: Mumbai
- Editor: Rochak Ahuja
- Camera setup: Multi-camera
- Running time: Approx. 24 minutes
- Production company: Creative Eye Limited

Original release
- Network: Colors TV
- Release: 28 December 2009 – 2 September 2010

Yeh Pyar Na Hoga Kam (transl. This Love Won't Diminish) is an Indian television drama series starring Yami Gautam and Gaurav Khanna. It aired on Colors TV, and premiered on 28 December 2009. The story is inspired from 2009 Bollywood flick Delhi-6.

The show is based on the love story between Abeer (Khanna) and Leher (Gautam). It was one of the shows that replaced Bigg Boss 3 after its grand finale, the other being Laagi Tujhse Lagan. Its original run ended on 2 September 2010 due to poor ratings.

== Overview ==
This is the story of Abeer and Leher's love set against the background of caste politics and class differences. The story unfolds in the picturesque township of Lucknow where a Brahmin's son Abeer falls for a Kayastha's daughter Leher. The show portrays the often heard though never-seen-before love story of people from different castes battling their own families and the society in order to unite. The story plays on the popular adage, 'Love is blind' but is also a scathing critique on our country's obsession with caste and class.

Abeer Bajpayee comes from a very wealthy family and is his family's only son. He is a student at the local university pursuing a degree in law so that he can follow his father's footsteps.

The Bajpayees have a Kayasth family, the Mathurs, as their neighbor. There is a rift between both the families because of a building construction (common wall) problem, while building their houses. Mr. Kulbhushan Mathur and his family is delighted to receive his elder brother, Mr. Brijbhushan Mathur, who works in the electricity department and is transferred to Lucknow. Brijbhushan is accompanied by his wife (played by Prachi Shah) whom he lovingly calls 'Dulhan' and his two daughters, Guddan (Leher) and Bittan.

Abeer sees Leher when she is moving her luggage from the truck into the house and is attracted towards her. He even helps her unload the truck without her taking any notice and while helping her, he picks up her payal which falls to the ground in the rush and keeps it with him. He is really smitten by her and tries to talk to her so that he can know her name but she only brushes him away whenever he tries to even attempt to talk to her. She even doesn't tell him her name, until he knows it from Bittan. Abeer helps Leher's family with a lot of things much to the dislike of his family thereby creating a rift between him and his family. After a lot of drama, Abeer and Leher marry each other and the show progresses.

== Cast ==
- Gaurav Khanna as Abeer Bajpayee / Lalla (Lead)
- Yami Gautam as Leher Mathur / Guddan (Leher Bajpayee after marrying Abeer) (Lead)
- Parul Gulati as Bittan (Lehar's young sister)
- Bhupinder Singh as Triyogi Narayan Bajpayee (Abeer's father) (Antagonist)
- Aishwarya Narkar as Sudha Triyogi Narayan Bajpayee (Abeer's mother)
- Prachi Shah / Shweta Gautam as Mridula Mathur (Leher and Bittan's mother)
- Meeankshi Verma as Dadi (Abeer's grandmother) (Antagonist)
- Rajveer Singh Palawat as Banke
- Tushar Dalvi as Brijbhushan Mathur (Leher and Bittan's father)
- Rohitash Gaud as Kulbhushan Mathur (Brijbhushan's younger brother) (Antagonist)
- Akhlaque Khan as Ankur Mathur (Kulbhushan's son)
- Indu Verma as Rama Mathur
- Puneet Tejwani as Madhav Shukla
- Amit Behl as Mr. Shukla (Madhav's father) (Antagonist)
- Nupur Alankar as Mrs.Shukla (Madhav's mother) (Antagonist)
- Chandan K Anand as Omi (The college goon) (Antagonist)
