= Shivin Narang =

Indian television actor

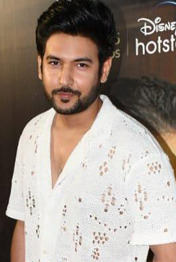
- Narang in 2023
- Born: 7 August 1990
- Occupation: Actor
- Years active: 2012–present
- Notable work: Internet Wala Love; Beyhadh 2; Fear Factor: Khatron Ke Khiladi 10

Shivin Narang (born 7 August 1990) is an Indian television actor. He is best known for his portrayal of Jay Mittal in Colors TV's Internet Wala Love and as Rudra Roy in Sony TV's romantic-thriller Beyhadh 2 (2019–2020). In 2020, he participated in the reality show Fear Factor: Khatron Ke Khiladi 10.

In 2012, he made his acting debut with Channel V's Suvreen Guggal – Topper of The Year playing Yuvraj Singh. In 2022, he made his Bollywood debut with a supporting role in the Amitabh Bachchan starrer slice-of-life comedy-drama Goodbye.

== Career ==
=== Debut and breakthrough (2012–2019) ===
Narang made his television debut with Channel V India's Suvreen Guggal – Topper of The Year (2012–13), backed by 4 Lions Films, where he was cast as Yuvraj Singh, a youngster studying in college and the boyfriend of the titular lead.

He achieved desirable prominence when he got the main role of the titular lead's elder step brother Ranvijay Singh in Star Plus's multi starrer Ek Veer Ki Ardaas...Veera, created by Beyond Dreams Production, alongside Farnaz Shetty and Digangana Suryavanshi, wherein he was present from 2013–2015 until its end.

After two years, Narang was seen in 2017 as Reyhan in the second season of the international TV series Cahaya Cinha. His first music video Dil Zaffran, sung by Rahat Fateh Ali Khan was released in 2018. In August 2018, he joined the lead cast of Colors TV's romantic drama Internet Wala Love opposite Tunisha Sharma as radio jockey Jai Mittal but the show went off air in March 2019.

=== Further success, music videos and film debut (2019–present) ===
In 2019, Narang agreed to participate in and shot as a contestant for Colors TV's stunt based reality show Fear Factor: Khatron Ke Khiladi 10 that was broadcast in 2020. His second music video, Yaad Piya Ki Aane Lagi co-starring Divya Khosla Kumar, was launched in November 2019 and became a chartbuster hit.

In December 2019, he started gaining praise for his work as Rudra Roy opposite Jennifer Winget in Sony TV's thriller Beyhadh 2, produced by Prateek Sharma. The show was abruptly cancelled without a proper ending in March 2020 due to COVID-19 pandemic.

In 2022, he was seen as Mudassar Singh in Goodbye opposite Rashmika Mandanna.

== Filmography ==
=== Films ===
Key
†	Denotes films that have not yet been released

Year	Title	Role	Notes	Ref.
2020	Dheet Patangey	Maddy		
2022	Goodbye	Mudassar Singh		
2022	Rosie: The Saffron Chapter †	Raghav		
2022	Hari Up †	TBA	Filming	
2025	Jatadhara			

=== Television ===
Year	Title	Role	Notes	Ref.
2012–2013	Suvreen Guggal – Topper of The Year	Yuvraj "Yuvi" Singh		
2013–2015	Ek Veer Ki Ardaas...Veera	Ranvijay "Ranvi" Singh		
2017	Cahaya Cinta 2	Rehan		
2018–2019	Internet Wala Love	Jay Mittal		
2019–2020	Beyhadh 2	Rudra Roy		
2020	Fear Factor: Khatron Ke Khiladi 10	Contestant	5th place	

=== Web series ===
Year	Title	Role	Notes	Ref.
2023	Aakhri Sach	Aman		

=== Special appearances ===
Year	Title	Role	Notes	Ref.
2018	Bigg Boss 12	Himself		
2023	Entertainment Ki Raat Housefull	Himself	Episode 5, 6	

=== Music videos ===
Year	Title	Singer(s)	Ref.
2018	Dil Zaffran	Rahat Fateh Ali Khan	
2019	Yaad Piya Ki Aane Lagi	Neha Kakkar	
2020	Chadeya Fitoor	Shahid Mallya, Deedar Kaur	
2020	Sunn Zara	JalRaj	
2020	Gale Lagana hai	Tony Kakkar, Neha Kakkar	
2021	Fakira	Amit Mishra,	
2021	Dooriyan	Raghav Chaitanya	
2021	Toota Tara	Stebin Ben	
2021	Bas Ek Tera Main Hoke	Stebin Ben	
2021	Chale Aatein Hai	Raj Barman	
2021	Mainu Lagda	Raj Barman, Sakshi Holkar	
2021	Main Tera Ho Gaya	Yasser Desai	
2022	Musafir	Ankit Tiwari	
2022	Akhiyaan Na Akhiyaan	Asees Kaur, Goldie Sohel	
2022	Ijazzat Hai	Raj Barman	
2022	Barsaat Ho Jaaye	Jubin Nautiyal, Payal Dev	
2022	Jahan Base Dil	Raj Barman	
2022	Manzoor	Dev Arijit	
2022	Pehli Barsaat	Danish Sabri	
2022	Deewana Deewana	Raj Barman	
2022	Nagin Wala Step	Ankit Tiwari	
2023	Tere Liye Main	Raj Barman	

== See also ==
List of Indian television actors
