= Ajay Chaudhary =

Indian television actor and model

Ajay Singh Chaudhary
- Born: 25 November 1984 (age 41)
- Occupations: Actor, model
- Years active: 2007–present
- Known for: Phulwa
- Spouse: Jyoti Makkar

Ajay Singh Chaudhary is an Indian television actor and model known for ACP Abhay Rai Singh in Phulwa, Vishnu Kashyap in Uttaran, Akash in Junoon – Aisi Nafrat Toh Kaisa Ishq, and as Baldev Singh in Rishton Ka Chakravyuh and as Pralyankar in Tenali Rama.

== Career ==
Chaudhary started his career with Love Story as Dev on SAB TV and appears in the role of Abhay & Vishnu in Phulwa & Uttaran.

== Filmography ==
=== Film ===
Year	Title	Role
2009	Let's Dance (2009 film)	Neil Choudhary

=== Television ===
Year	Title	Role
2006	Ssshhhh...Phir Koi Hai	Priyesh (Episode 8)
2007	Ssshhhh...Phir Koi Hai	(Episode 21)
2007–2008	Love Story	Dev
2008	Champ	Dhruv
2008	Sujata	Jatin
2008–2009	Kumkum – Ek Pyara Sa Bandhan	Ustaad
2009	Palampur Express	Dhruv
2010–2011	Behenein	Amar Patel
2010–2011	Dil Se Diya Vachan	Krushna Karmakar
2011	Anhoniyon Ka Andhera	Rohan
2011–2012	Phulwa	ACP Abhay Singh
2012	Teri Meri Love Stories	Akash
2012–2013	Junoon – Aisi Nafrat Toh Kaisa Ishq	Akash
2013–2015	Uttaran	Vishnu Kashyap
2017–2018	Rishton Ka Chakravyuh	Baldev Singh
2018	Laal Ishq	Rawal
2020	Tenali Rama	Mahamatya Pralyankar
2022	Swaran Ghar	Ajeet Lamba
2023–2024	Nath – Zewar Ya Zanjeer	Sukant
2025	Ram Bhavan	Raghvendra Thakur
2025	Ghum Hai Kisikey Pyaar Meiin	Shrichand Goyal
2025	Udne Ki Aasha	Ranjeet
2025–present	Jagadhatri	Sharad Joshi
2026–present	Sayoneee	Advocate Kabir
