= Pooja Meri Jaan =

2026 Indian Hindi-language crime thriller film Navjot Gulati

- Official release poster
- Directed by: Navjot Gulati
- Written by: Navjot Gulati; Kanishka Singh Deo
- Screenplay by: Niren Bhatt
- Produced by: Dinesh Vijan; Amar Kaushik
- Starring: Mrunal Thakur; Huma Qureshi; Vikram Singh Chauhan; Vijay Raaz; Rajesh Jais
- Cinematography: Madhukar S. Rao
- Edited by: Sanyukta Kaza
- Music by: Vishal Mishra
- Production company: Maddock Films
- Distributed by: ZEE5
- Release date: 2 October 2026
- Running time: 117 minutes
- Country: India
- Language: Hindi

Pooja Meri Jaan is a 2026 Indian Hindi-language crime thriller film directed by Navjot Gulati and co-directed by Vipasha Arvind. Produced by Dinesh Vijan and Amar Kaushik under Maddock Films, it stars Huma Qureshi, Mrunal Thakur, Vijay Raaz, and Vikram Singh Chauhan. The story follows a woman who is blamed for a man's death and a lawyer who becomes involved in her case.

The film was announced in July 2022, after filming had been completed. Following delays to its release, it was premiered on ZEE5 on 2 October 2026.

== Premise ==
Pooja Dogra (Mrunal Thakur) and Aniket Shrivastava (Vikram Singh Chauhan) are two close theatre partners and friends of five years who regularly act as lovers on stage. Over time, Aniket mistakes Pooja's genuine friendship and emotional support for romantic interest, holding on to a one-sided belief that their bond is romantic. Driven by his unrequited affection, Aniket publicly proposes marriage to Pooja, but she turns down his proposal because she does not share his feelings. Unable to cope with the rejection, Aniket tragically dies by suicide. In the aftermath of his death, Pooja becomes the primary target of harsh public condemnation, social media hostility, and moral judgment. Held responsible for his tragic end, she is formally accused of abetment of suicide and subsequently arrested. Sana Mehfooz ( Huma Qureshi ), a practicing lawyer and mutual friend of both Pooja and Aniket, steps in to handle Pooja's defense in court. As the courtroom proceedings unfold alongside flashbacks revealing their shared past, conflicting accounts force a deeper examination of consent, male entitlement, and the line between unrequited love and dangerous obsession.

== Cast ==
- Mrunal Thakur as Pooja Dogra
- Huma Qureshi as Sana Mehfooz
- Vikram Singh Chauhan as Aniket Shrivastava
- Vijay Raaz as Jatin Trivedi
- Rajesh Jais as Gulshan Dogra
- Rituraj Singh as Asad Mehfooz
- Shant Manu as Jagdish Singh
- Chaitanya Vyas as Nikhil
- Jasviekaa Dixxeeth as Kajal
- Nikhil Angrish as Mayank Joshi
- Pranav Chadha as Udayveer
- Sunita Rajwar as Sushila Chauhan

== Production ==
=== Development ===
According to Gulati, the idea for Pooja Meri Jaan arose during a road trip to Goa. After arriving, he described the premise to Amar Kaushik, who encouraged him to develop it into a film. The initial idea concerned a man who threatens to kill himself and hold a woman responsible if she refuses to marry him. Gulati described the film as examining men's responses to rejection, alongside toxic relationships and a courtroom narrative.

The film was written by Kanishka and Gulati, with additional screenplay and dialogue by Niren Bhatt. Vipasha Arvind served as co-director, and Vijan and Kaushik produced the film.

=== Casting and filming ===
Maddock Films announced the film in July 2022 with Thakur, Qureshi, Chauhan and Raaz in the principal cast. The announcement confirmed that filming had already concluded. Post-production was completed by the end of 2022.

Thakur said that playing Pooja required her to convey different emotional states while withholding information that would be revealed later in the narrative. Chauhan said that his preparation focused on understanding his character's motivations and responses to rejection, as the audience's understanding of the character changes during the film.

Jishnu Bhattacharjee served as director of photography, and Vishal Mishra composed the music.

== Release ==
Pooja Meri Jaan was originally intended for a direct-to-streaming release on JioCinema. Its release plans became uncertain following the platform's merger with Disney+ Hotstar, and the film was subsequently offered to other streaming services.

In February 2026, Gulati publicly criticised the prolonged delay. In an interview with Variety India, reported by the Hindustan Times, he attributed the stalled release to disagreements over the price sought by the producers. He said that negotiations with one platform had continued for nine months and questioned why a theatrical release had not been pursued.

In July 2026, Zee 5 included the film in its forthcoming Hindi-language slate. On 19 September, the platform announced that it would premiere on 2 October 2026.

== Reception ==
Archika Khurana of The Times of India rated it 3 out of 5 and described it as an intriguing tale of rejection. She considered Thakur the film's strongest anchor but felt the courtroom drama never generated the tension or intellectual conflict its premise promised, concluding that a strong idea had been undone by uneven execution. A reviewer for NDTV also gave it 3 out of 5, praising the lead performances and summing the film up as "a chilled, one-time watch if you are in the mood for a quick thriller". Mayur Sanap of Rediff.com rated it 3 out of 5 as well, calling the film "well-intentioned, if not particularly brave" and noting that, although it sometimes turned heavy-handed, it made the point that any conversation about consent must begin with taking a rejection seriously. Anuj Kumar of The Hindu felt the film raised valid points about male entitlement but remained oddly lifeless, observing that its heavy reliance on dialogue and an expository style blunted the urgency of the subject even as Thakur's performance held it together. He signed off that it was "not bad if you are scanning for a title on a lazy Sunday afternoon".

Rishabh Suri of Hindustan Times gave it 2.5 out of 5, crediting the film for engaging with consent more seriously than most Hindi cinema but faulting it for backing away from moral complexity and settling for a tidy resolution. Shubhra Gupta of The Indian Express, rating it 1.5 out of 5, found the premise worthwhile and the lead character refreshing, but felt thinly written characters kept the film from rising above the surface, remarking that "good intentions do not always a good film make". Rahul Desai of The Hollywood Reporter India described it as a cheaply mounted thriller whose craft lacked the maturity its grown-up themes demanded, summarising the film as "an unconvincing postmortem of the male gaze". Nandini Ramnath of Scroll.in wrote that the film led viewers on much as its heroine was accused of doing, treating the central relationship too shallowly to be even-handed, though she praised Thakur as "the liveliest actor around".
