= Pyar Ka Pehla Naam: Radha Mohan =

2022 Indian drama television series

- Genre: Drama mystery Supernatural fiction Horror
- Created by: Prateek Sharma
- Directed by: Prateek Shah; Sandeep Shivkant
- Creative director: Ameeta Devadigga
- Starring: Shabir Ahluwalia; Neeharika Roy
- Composer: Paresh Shah
- Country of origin: India
- Original language: Hindi
- No. of episodes: 843

Production
- Producer: Prateek Sharma
- Editor: Amit Singh
- Camera setup: Multi-camera
- Running time: 21—22 minutes
- Production company: Studio LSD Private Limited

Original release
- Network: Zee TV
- Release: 2 May 2022 – 4 September 2024

Related
- Yaaradi Nee Mohini

Pyar Ka Pehla Naam: Radha Mohan (transl. The First Name of Love: Radha Mohan) is an Indian Hindi-language supernatural romantic drama television series. It is produced by Prateek Sharma and premiered from 2 May 2022 on Zee TV. It is the official remake of Zee Tamil's TV series Yaaradi Nee Mohini. It stars Shabir Ahluwalia as Mohan and Neeharika Roy as Radha. After a successful run of two years the show went off-air on 4 September 2024, days after its spin-off series Pyar Ka Pehla Adhyaya: Shiv Shakti too was off-aired. The story follows Mohan, whose deceased first wife Tulsi wanders as a ghost to protect their daughter Gungun, and Radha, who is in love with him.

== Plot ==
Mohan's first wife, Tulsi, dies and their daughter, Gungun, considers him to be Tulsi's murderer. Meanwhile, Radha is in love with Mohan and considers him her inspiration. Tulsi's soul has not received salvation and she wanders in the Trivedi house as a ghost; and she protects Gungun.

Mohan's stepmother, Kadambari, wants Mohan to remarry and she chooses her niece, Damini. Mohan agrees to marry Damini for the sake of Kadambari. Meanwhile, Radha saves Gungun's life and Radha stays at the Trivedi house as a guest.

Radha and Mohan become closer which makes Damini jealous. Kadambari and Damini learn about Tulsi's soul and they both unsuccessfully try to imprison her with the help of Guru Maa. Later, Gungun and Radha become good friends. In order to get Radha out of the Trivedi house, Damini accuses her of theft but Radha proves herself innocent. Later, Radha's grandmother sets Radha's marriage to Hriday who plans to sell Radha after they marry. Mohan and Gungun grow closer while trying to prevent Hriday and Radha's marriage. Gungun learns about Hriday's truth, he throws her into a borewell. Gungun is rescued by Radha and Mohan. Hriday is exposed but is assisted by Damini, who continues to try to kill Radha and Gungun.

Kadambari notices that Radha has feelings for Mohan and tries to tell him, but Damini threatens her and tries to instigate her against Radha. Radha then suspects Damini and tries to expose her but fails. On Mohan and Damini's wedding day, Damini causes misunderstandings between Radha and Mohan, causing Mohan to ask Radha to return to her home. Tulsi then arrives and encourages her to stop the wedding. She dresses Radha as a bride. Radha then forcefully marries Mohan who promises to make her life hell. Slowly Mohan falls for Radha. Radha then visits Mohan's office where she learns that Damini is responsible for Tulsi's death. She tries to expose Damini but fails, causing another rift between her and Mohan.

Damini locks Radha in a freezer which nearly kills her. Mohan then manages to rescue her realising his feelings for her. After Radha recovers, she does not reveal that it was Damini's doing. However, Damini decides to punish Mohan for falling for Radha. Meanwhile, Radha's estranged mother Gargi/Mandira visits Barsana and she reveals to Mohan why she abandoned Radha and Rameshwar. Gargi wanted to live a lavish life, so she created a new identity by fraudulently marrying another man. Radha overhears her conversation.

Damini tries to kill Gungun but fails as Radha protects her. Gungun then calls Radha her mother, Ramaa. Damini reminds Mohan of his planned divorce with Radha to which Mohan refuses and breaks his promise of marrying her. Mohan then plans to confess his feelings to Radha. Gungun finds Tulsi's letters, which were planted by Damini, blaming Radha for her death. Gungun stays away from Radha and together with Rahul and Tulsi's mother they file a case against Radha. Despite other family members believing these allegations, Mohan reveals to Radha that he believes that she did not kill Tulsi. Mohan learns that Damini is working with Tulsi's brother. He then manages to make Gungun realise that Radha is innocent and Gungun apologises to her. In order to stop Mohan from saving Radha, Damini kidnaps him and the judge sentences Radha to death. With the help of Shakti and Dua, Radha is able to escape her execution and briefly reunites with her family. She then sets out to find Mohan. Damini again tries to kill Radha but she outsmarts her and finds Mohan. Radha and Mohan briefly reunite and run away together before being intercepted by Damini. Mohan takes a bullet for Radha and asks her to flee.

After a period of events, Radha's innocence is revealed and she is dropped from the death sentence, angering Damini and Kaveri. Radha returns to the Trivedi house with Mohan. Radha and Mohan decide to get married again, while Damini and her mother unsuccessfully oppose it.

In order to forget the troubles that happened with Radha, Mohan and the family decide to vacation in the Maldives. Damini learns of this and decides to go with them. After Radha and Mohan spend two days in the Maldives, Damini tries to kill Radha and causes her some problems, but fails to kill her, thanks to Mohan.

Mohan and Radha with the family decide to return home, and when they board the plane, they are surprised by the presence of a criminal gang trying to kill the passengers. Amid the passengers' fear, a gang member plants a bomb on the plane, which sparks news and media. But the police were able to arrest the criminals and dismantle the bomb in time.

Upon returning home, Tulsi's soul takes possession of Mohan's body, making Mohan do unnatural things. The family calls a priest to free Tulsi's soul from Mohan's body, but they are surprised when the priest tells them that Tulsi's soul will not leave Mohan's soul until she eliminates her killer, who is a member of the house.

Damini and her mother contact Guru Maa in order to eliminate Tulsi's spirit. She tells them that Tulsi's spirit possesses Mohan from time to time. Mohan sees Damini in a state of extreme fatigue and decides to take her to the hospital. Damini is surprised that Tulsi's spirit has taken over Mohan's body in order to kill her in the burning house where she was killed, but she manages to escape. Radha learns of Damini's communication with Guru Maa and decides to expose them. Radha begins to suspect that Guru Maa is Kadambari. The family decides to celebrate Damini's birthday, but in the middle of the party, Tulsi takes over Mohan and threatens her to confess that she was the one who killed her. Damini confesses that she was the one who killed Tulsi in front of the police and family. At the same time, Mohan and Radha admit that this was their plan to reveal the truth about Damini and that Tulsi never possessed Mohan. Before being arrested, Damini manages to escape and kidnap Gungun. Damini threatens Radha, but Radha summons Tulsi's spirit to help her save Gungun's life from Damini. Tulsi's spirit responds to her on the condition that she appears with the intention of killing her killer, who is Damini. Damini takes Gungun to the valley in order to kill her there, and Radha and Mohan follow her. During the attempt to kill her, the spirit of Tulsi appears and kills Damini and throws her from the valley and saves Gungun.

Tulsi suspects that her real killer is still alive and is a family member. She tells Radha this before she disappears and asks Radha to be aware of her surroundings. Radha suspects that Tulsi's real killer is Guru Maa. She goes to Tulsi's burned-out house in order to search for any clues. She finds Kadambari there and confesses to her that she herself is Guru Maa and the real killer of Tulsi. Kadambari decides to kill Radha by locking her in the burnt house and burning her. While Kadambari thinks that she got rid of Radha, Radha discovers that the bones of Tulsi's body are still there and have not been cremated in all these years. Kadambari is surprised when Radha returns home with the bones of Tulsi's body and threatens her.

Surprisingly, Tulsi walks in with Mohan at that moment. The family decide to hide the fact that Radha is married to Mohan. Tulsi makes outrageous demands to Mohan, even going as far as asking for Mohan to take Radha's mangalsutra off. However Gungun tells Mohan that he need to give Radha back the mangalsutra. Tulsi attempts to kill herself, but Radha believes that she is bluffing and dares her to jump. So Tulsi jumps, resulting in Gungun becoming angry with Radha. Radha tries to warn the family against the fake Tulsi, but they believe she is mentally ill and suggest thar she gets a checkup. It is revealed that Tulsi really had disappeared and the Tulsi in their house was none other than Damini, who is in cahoots with Kadambari. Vishwanath finds about this and tries to warn the others, but Kadambari manipulates them into thinking Vishwanath was lying in behest of Radha.

Damini and Kadambari decide to oust Radha from Mohan's life. They make it seem like Radha threw Vishwanath off the balcony. Mohan finally believes that Radha is mentally ill and sends her to an asylum. Damini and Kadambari then plan to get rid of Gungun by bringing her to wildlife sanctuary. However, Radha becomes aware of the plan and runs away to save Gungun. Damini tries to kill Gungun by throwing Gungun in front of the lion, but Radha manages to save her. Mohan also arrives there, but refuses to believe Radha, as Radha had slapped Kadambari. Mohan blames Radha for destroying his and his daughter's life. At her wit's end, Radha breaks her nuptial chain and cuts all ties with Mohan. Radha leaves with the mental asylum workers.

=== 7 years later ===
Radha is revealed to be living as Radhika Kohli in South Delhi as a successful radio host. She is now married to a businessman named Yug Kohli, and Manan, her and Mohan's son, considers Yug as his own father. Mohan and his family have also moved into the same city and live in Meera's house. Gungun is now a teenager and feels that irrespective of Radha and Mohan's personal issues, Radha should not have abandoned her, so she hates Radha. Gungun is now being cared for by Meera, who is also Mohan's businesses partner. Meera likes Mohan and Gungun also wishes that Mohan would marry Meera.

Mohan, however, still lives with Radha's memories. Seven years ago, after Gungun got consciousness, she revealed that Tulsi is Damini. Damini is then arrested for her crimes. Kadambari's truth is still hidden and she is paralyzed now. It is revealed that Kadambari had strangulated Vishwanath to death, but before he died, he threw a vase at Kadambari, which resulted in her current condition.

Mohan and his family move to Yug's neighboring house where Mohan and Gungun meet Manan, with whom they develop a close bond. Meanwhile, it is revealed that Radha is still affected from Mohan's ill behaviour towards her. She misses Mohan, but at the same time has vowed to keep herself and Manan away from him.

== Cast ==
=== Main ===
- Neeharika Roy as Radha "Radhika" Sharma Trivedi: Rameshwar and Gargi's daughter (2022–2024)
  - Kiara Sadh as Child Radha Sharma (2022)
- Shabir Ahluwalia as Mohan Trivedi: Vishwanath and Sakshi's son (2022–2024)
  - Arunim Mishra as Teenage Mohan Trivedi (2022)
- Manit Joura as Yug Kohli: Poonam's elder son (2024)

=== Recurring ===
- Sarah Killedar as Gungun Trivedi: Tulsi and Mohan's daughter (2024)
  - Reeza Chaudhary as Child Gungun Trivedi (2022–2024)
- Shaurya Vijayvargiya as Manan Trivedi: Radha and Mohan's son (2024)
- Keerti Nagpure as
  - Tulsi Banerjee Trivedi: Narmada's daughter (2022–2024) (Dead / Ghost)
  - Damini Bharadwaj (After plastic surgery): Kaveri's daughter (2024)
    - Sambhabana Mohanty as Damini Bharadwaj (before plastic surgery) (2022–2024)
- Swati Shah as Kadambari "Gurumaa" Trivedi: Kaveri's sister (2022–2024)
- Rajendra Lodhia as Vishwanath Trivedi: Sakshi's widower (2022–2024)
- Manisha Purohit as Kaveri Bharadwaj: Kadambari's sister (2022–2024)
- Pooja Kawa as Ketki Trivedi Kashyap: Kadambari and Vishwanath's daughter (2022–2024)
- Sumit Arora as Ajeet Kashyap: Padma's son; Ketki's husband (2022–2024)
- Mayanshi Verma as Sargam "Shalgam" Kashyap: Ketki and Ajeet's daughter (2024)
- Ranveer Singh Malik as Rahul Trivedi: Kadambari and Vishwanath's son; Ketki's brother; Mohan's half-brother (2022–2024)
- Saarvie Omana as Meera: Mohan's friend and one-sided lover (2024)
- Roma Navani as Poonam Kohli: Yug and Garv's mother (2024)
- Sheela Sharma as Pari Kohli: Yug and Garv's grandmother (2024) (Dead)
- Vrutansh Upadhyay as Garv Kohli: Poonam's younger son; Yug's brother (2024)
- Brijkishore Tiwari as Rameshwar Sharma: Sundari's son (2022–2024)
- Kajal Khanchandani as Sundari Sharma: Rameshwar's mother (2022–2024)
- Parineeta Borthakur as Gargi Sharma / Mandira Kashyap: Rameshwar's estranged wife; Radha's mother (2023)
- Jhuma Mitra as Padma Kashyap: Ajeet's mother (2023)
- Harvineet Patel as Gaurav (2024)
- Adi Irani as Kulbhushan (2023)
- Sunny Sachdev / Manish Chawla as Advocate Shekhar (2022–2023) / (2023)
- Aleeza Khan as Advocate Devika Sahay (2023)
- Abdu Rozik as Chota Bhaijaan (2023)
- Krishnakant Singh Bundela as Panditji (2022–2023)
- Suzanne Bernert as Mr. X in a guest appearance (2023)

== Production ==
=== Development ===
In 2022 Zee TV planned an official Hindi remake of Zee Tamil's Tamil-language series Yaaradi Nee Mohini to be produced by Prateek Sharma. It is the second Hindi remake after Main Bhi Ardhangini, which aired on &TV from 21 January 2019 to 1 November 2019. The shooting of the series began in April 2022.

=== Release ===
The first promo was released in April 2022 featuring Shabir Ahluwalia and Neeharika Roy.

== Adaptations ==
Language	Title	Original release	Network(s)	Last aired	Notes	Ref.
Tamil	Yaaradi Nee Mohini யாரடி நீ மோகினி	24 April 2017	Zee Tamil	22 August 2021	Original	
Kannada	Yaare Nee Mohini ಯಾರೇ ನೀ ಮೋಹಿನಿ	18 September 2017	Zee Kannada	4 December 2020	Remake	
Telugu	Evare Nuvvu Mohini ఎవరే నువ్వు మోహిని	11 December 2017	Zee Telugu	4 May 2018	Remake	
Odia	Mu Bi Ardhangini ମୁ ବି ଅର୍ଦ୍ଧାଙ୍ଗିନୀ	9 July 2018	Zee Sarthak	11 January 2020	Remake	
Hindi	Main Bhi Ardhangini में भी अर्धांगिनी	21 January 2019	And TV	1 November 2019	Remake	
Hindi	Pyar Ka Pehla Naam: Radha Mohan प्यार का पहला नाम: राधा मोहन	2 May 2022	Zee TV	4 September 2024	Remake	
Bengali	Alor Kole আলোর কোলে	27 November 2023	Zee Bangla	22 June 2024	Remake	
Malayalam	Mayamayooram മായാമയൂരം	18 December 2023	Zee Keralam	24 November 2024	Remake	
