= Nimisha Vakharia =

Indian actress

- Born: Mumbai, Maharashtra, India
- Occupation: Actress
- Spouse: Nitin Vakharia

Nimisha Vakharia is an Indian actress, working in Hindi TV shows.

== Television ==
Year(s)	Show	Role	Notes
1999	Ek Mahal Ho Sapno Ka	Purnima	
2005–2010	Baa Bahoo Aur Baby	Charubala Tusshar Bhayani	Main role / Supporting role
2006	Kumkum – Ek Pyara Sa Bandhan	Shanti	Cameo
2007–2009	Teen Bahuraaniyaan	Kokila Gheewala	Nominated—Indian Telly Award for Best Actress in a Negative Role (2007)
2008	Saas v/s Bahu	Herself / contestant	Dance reality show
2008–2009	Shree	Putlibai	Supporting role
2010–2012	Ram Milaayi Jodi	Bijal Gandhi	Negative role
2010	Taarak Mehta Ka Ooltah Chashmah	Jayshree Parekh	Guest appearance for promoting Khichdi: The Movie
2011	Adaalat	Mrs Thakkar	"K.D. in Ahmedabad" (episode 56)
2011–2015	Sasural Simar Ka	Manoranjan Singh	Negative role
2014	Badi Door Se Aaye Hai	Advocate Neelima Raichura	Cameo
2016	Tamanna	Dharaa's mother-in-law	Supporting role
2016	Balika Vadhu	Triveni	Supporting role
2017–2020, 2024–2025	Tenali Rama	Lakshmiamma	Supporting role
2020	Shakti – Astitva Ke Ehsaas Ki	Tejinder Singh	Supporting role
2021	Wagle Ki Duniya – Nayi Peedhi Naye Kissey	Rekha Gondalekar	Guest appearance
2022	Shubh Laabh – Aapkey Ghar Mein	Kavita Toshniwal	Negative Role
2022	Anandibaa Aur Emily	Kalindi "Kallu"	Cameo Role
2023	Ajooni	Amrit Jarnail Singh Bagga	Negative Role
2023–2024	Pyaar Ka Pehla Adhyaya: Shiv Shakti	Manorama	Supporting Role
2024–present	United States of Gujarat (Colors Gujarati)	Jasumati Modi	Negative Role

== Filmography ==
Year	Film	Role
2010	Khichdi: The Movie	Jayshree Parekh
2025	Dhoom Dhaam	Suhasini Poddar
