= Gold Award for Best Actor in a Negative Role =

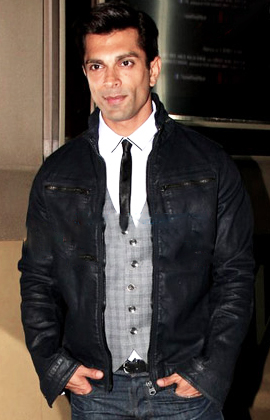
- The 2019 recipient: Karan Singh Grover
- Awarded for: Best Performance by a Male Actor in a Negative Role on Television
- Country: India
- Presented by: White Leaf Entertainment
- First award: 2007 (for performances in TV shows in 2006)
- Currently held by: Karan Singh Grover for Kasautii Zindagii Kay (Popular); Sanjay Gagnani for Kundali Bhagya (Jury)
- Website: Gold Awards

Gold Award for Best Actor in a Negative Role is an award given by Zee TV as part of its annual Gold Awards for Indian television series and artists, to recognize a male actor who has delivered an outstanding performance in a supporting role.

The award was first awarded in 2007 and since has been separated in two categories, Critics Award and Popular Award. Critics Award is given by the chosen jury of critics assigned to the function while Popular Award is given on the basis of public voting.

== List of winners ==
=== 2000s ===
- 2007 Mohnish Bahl - Ek Ladki Anjaani Si as Veer
  - Akashdeep Saigal - Kyunki Saas Bhi Kabhi Bahu Thi as Eklavya Virani
  - Jatin Shah - Kasturi as Raunak Singhania
  - Chetan Hansraj - Kahaani Ghar Ghar Kii as Shasha
  - Vikas Manaktala - Left Right Left as Cadet Amardeep Hooda
  - Ronit Roy - Kasamh Se as Aparjit Deb
- 2008 Chetan Hansraj - Kahaani Ghar Ghar Kii as Shasha
  - Akashdeep Saigal - Kyunki Saas Bhi Kabhi Bahu Thi as Eklavya Virani
  - Jatin Shah - Kasturi as Raunak Singhania
  - Chetan Hansraj - Dharti Ka Veer Yodha Prithviraj Chauhan as Raja Bhimdev
  - Satyajit Sharma - Balika Vadhu as Basant Singh
  - Raj Premi - Jai Shri Krishna as Kans
- 2009 Not Held

=== 2010s ===
- 2010 Sudesh Berry - Agle Janam Mohe Bitiya Hi Kijo as Loha Singh
  - Satyajit Sharma - Balika Vadhu as Basant Singh
  - Sharad Kelkar - Bairi Piya as Thakur Digvijay Singh
  - Aadesh Chaudhary - Laagi Tujhse Lagan as Digamber
  - Anand Goradia - Na Aana Is Des Laado as Gajender Sangwan
- 2011 Anupam Shyam - Mann Kee Awaaz Pratigya as Thakur Sajjan Singh
  - Vishwajeet Pradhan - Maryada: Lekin Kab Tak? as Brahmanand
  - Nikhil Arya - Tere Liye as Ritesh Basu
  - Pankaj Vishnu - Pavitra Rishta as Arjit Lokhande
- 2012 Anupam Shyam - Mann Kee Awaaz Pratigya as Thakur Sajjan Singh
  - Mahesh Shetty - Bade Achhe Lagte Hain as Siddhant Kapoor
  - Kiran Karmarkar - Uttaran as Tej Singh Bundela
  - Karanvir Bohra - Dil Se Di Dua... Saubhagyavati Bhava? as Viraj Dobriyal
- 2013 Mahesh Shetty - Bade Achhe Lagte Hain as Siddhant Kapoor
  - Kiran Karmarkar - Uttaran as Tej Singh Bundela
  - Vikram Singh Chauhan - Qubool Hai as Imran Qureshi
  - Kanwarjit Paintal - Pyaar Ka Dard Hai Meetha Meetha Pyaara Pyaara as Jagdish Gupta
  - Akshay Dogra - Punar Vivaah as Akash Sindhia
- 2014 Mohit Malik - Doli Armaano Ki as Samrat Singh Rathore
- 2015 Mohit Malik - Doli Armaano Ki as Samrat Singh Rathore
- 2016 Sangram Singh - Ye Hai Mohabbatein as Ashok Khanna
- 2017 Ayub Khan - Shakti - Astitva Ke Ehsaas Ki as Maninder Singh
- 2018 Arjun Bijlani - Ishq Mein Marjawan as Deep Raj Singh
- 2019 Karan Singh Grover - Kasautii Zindagii Kay as Rishabh Bajaj
