= Ek Deewaana Tha =

Indian romantic thriller TV series on Sony TV

- Genre: Thriller; Romance
- Created by: Prateek Sharma
- Written by: Mrinal Jha; Shilpa D'Mello; Sharad Tripathi
- Directed by: Manan Rawat; Prateek Shah; Ashish singh
- Creative director: Anil Kunwar
- Starring: See below
- Opening theme: Ek Deewana Tha
- Composer: Adil Prashant
- Country of origin: India
- Original language: Hindi
- No. of seasons: 1
- No. of episodes: 160

Production
- Producers: Prateek Sharma; Prem Krishen; Suman Sharma
- Camera setup: Multi-camera
- Running time: 21-22 minutes
- Production company: LSD Films Private Limited

Original release
- Network: Sony Entertainment Television
- Release: 23 October 2017 – 1 June 2018

Ek Deewaana Tha (transl. There was a lover) is an Indian horror thriller television show which was broadcast on Sony Entertainment Television from 23 October 2017 to 1 June 2018. The show was created by Prateek Sharma and produced by LSD Films Private Limited.

The series starred Namik Paul, Vikram Singh Chauhan and Donal Bisht.

== Plot ==
In a fatal accident, Sharanya ends up in a coma. After 2 years, When she wakes up, she has no memory of the last 3 years. Vyom introduced himself to be her boyfriend. After strange incidents spontaneously threaten Vyom's life caused by a spirit, Sharanya decides to marry Vyom to save his life angering the spirit. As they get married, the spirit kills Sharanya's father. The spirit attacks and injures Vyom again and again, and Sharanya goes to Kapali Hills to find out how she can protect Vyom. There she discovers Shiv’s (the spirit) dead body.

Sharanya tries to prove Vyom's crimes, his mother Madhvi takes the blame and arrested. Vyom's father Rajan Bedi wants his wife released so he fake his death and put the blame on him thus procuring Madhvi's release.

Vyom called Odhni to get rid of Shiv's spirit and, on her advice, Shiv's mother Swarna to get Sharanya to perform Shiv's last rites and burn all his belongings. Sharanya sees Rajan and Madhvi together and confronts Vyom. Vyom is forced to admit his crime - the murder of Shiv's father (to protect his own parents).

Sharanya tells him that she could never love him and prepares to leave but Rajan told Sharanya to give him Shiv's ring so he can get rid of Shiv's spirit for good. But before she can remove it, Swarna pushes her off a cliff to her death.

About to kill Swarna, a distraught Vyom instead kills himself.

=== 25 years later ===
Rajan and Madhvi are raising a girl named Shivani who is supposed to be Sharanya's rebirth, returns from London with her boyfriend Akash who is Vyom's lookalike (reincarnation) and whose mannerisms also remind Rajan of Vyom.

Shivani and Akash decide to get engaged and at their engagement party, Akash surprises her with her favourite superstar Krrish Khanna (KK) who is Shiv's lookalike(reincarnation). Then they meet Radhika at their film shooting who is Sharanya's lookalike(reincarnation).

Swarna reveals that Radhika is Sharanya's reincarnation and that Odhni and Swarna swapped the babies because Rajan and Madhvi wanted to adopt the girl expected to be Sharanya's reincarnation.

Krish and Radhika see Swarna and try to help her. Meanwhile, at Akash and Shivani's wedding, Akash is revealed to be Vyom. Swarna had prevented him from killing himself declaring it his punishment to stay alive. Akash described his true identity as Vyom and his story.

Shivani has gone missing and Radhika takes her place in the film. Krish convinces Radhika to join the film as they continue searching for Shivani. Radhika hears Shivani's phone ringing in the basement and goes there to find her but is confronted by Freddy and faints on seeing him. She awakens in her bed and is told by Akash that Rajan and Madhavi are in Manali to look for Shivani. However, Radhika shows Krish Freddy's shirt button to prove to him that she did see him in the basement.

Radhika and Krish go to the basement to find Shivani but are overpowered by Freddy. Radhika recall her past life that she remembers being in love with Vyom. Krish is shocked but Vyom is overjoyed to finally get Sharanya. But she is lying to find Swarna, Rajan and Madhvi. Krish tricks him into killing Freddy. Vyom commits suicide by jumping off a cliff.

Krish and Radhika are united, however it is not without obstacles; Vyom's spirit returns as he was deewana of Sharanya, is deewana of Sharanya and will be deewana of Sharanya.

== Cast ==
=== Main ===
- Namik Paul as double role
  - Shiv Kapoor: Sharanya's boyfriend, Swarna and Dhananjay's son(2017-2018)(Dead)
  - Krish Khanna: Shiv's reincarnation; Radhika's boyfriend (2018)
- Vikram Singh Chauhan as double role
  - Vyom Bedi: Sharanya's husband; Rajan and Madhvi's son; Rameshwar and Suman's son-in-law, Aditya's brother-in-law (2017-2018)
  - Aakash Khurana: Vyom's reincarnation; Shivani's boyfriend (2018)
- Donal Bisht as double role
  - Sharanya Bisht / Sharanya Bedi: Suman and Rameshwar's daughter; Aditya's sister; Shiv's girlfriend; Vyom's wife, Rajan and Madhavi's daughter-in-law (2017-2018)
  - Radhika : Sharanya's reincarnation, Shivani's best friend, Krish's girlfriend (2018)
- Shivani Surve as Shivani Bedi: Aakash's girlfriend, Rajan and Madhvi's adoptive daughter; Radhika's best friend (2018)

=== Recurring ===
- Sachin Parikh as Rameshwar "Ram" Bisht: Suman's husband; Sharanya and Aditya's father, Vyom's father-in-law (2017)
- Mamta Verma as Suman Bisht: Rameshwar's wife; Sharanya and Aditya's mother, Vyom's mother-in-law (2017)
- Gaurav Sareen as Aditya Bisht: Suman and Rameshwar's son; Sharanya's brother, Vyom's brother-in-law (2017)
- Amar Upadhyay as Rajan Bedi: Vidyut's elder brother; Madhvi's husband; Vyom's father, Sharanya's father-in-law, Shivani's adoptive father (2017-2018)
- Jaswinder Gardner as Madhvi Bedi: Rajan's wife; Vyom's mother, Sharanya 's mother-in-law, Shivani's adoptive mother (2017-2018)
- Ajay Nain as Vidyut Bedi: Rajan's younger brother; Rati's husband; Avni's father, Sharanya's molester (2017)
- Geeta Bisht as Rati Bedi: Vidyut's widow; Avni's mother (2017-2018)
- Raymon Kakar as Chandni Bedi: Rajan and Vidyut's sister-in-law, Rab's mother (2017-2018)
- Ayaan Khan as Rab Bedi: Chandni's son (2017-2018)
- Delnaaz Irani as Odhni: Freddy's ex-best friends (2017-2018)
- Jason Tham as Detective Freddy D’Mello: Vyom's best friend (2017-2018)
- Shilpa Tulaskar as Sadhvi: A spiritual lady (2017)
- Payal Nair as Swarna Mehra: Dhananjay's widow; Shiv's mother, Sharanya's murderer (2018)
