= Pyar Ka Pehla Adhyaya: Shiv Shakti =

Indian drama television series

- Genre: Drama; Thriller; Fiction
- Created by: Prateek Sharma
- Creative director: Avhiroop Mazzumdar
- Starring: Arjun Bijlani; Nikki Sharma
- Composer: Paresh Shah
- Country of origin: India
- Original language: Hindi
- No. of seasons: 1
- No. of episodes: 406

Production
- Producer: Prateek Sharma
- Camera setup: Multi-camera
- Running time: 20-24 minutes
- Production company: Studio LSD Private Limited

Original release
- Network: Zee TV; ZEE5
- Release: 3 July 2023 – 18 August 2024

Pyaar Ka Pehla Adhyaya: Shiv Shakti (transl. The First Chapter of Love: Shiv Shakti) is an Indian Hindi-language romantic drama television series that premiered on 3 July 2023 on Zee TV and digitally streams on ZEE5. Produced by Prateek Sharma under Studio LSD Private Limited, it is a spin-off of Pyar Ka Pehla Naam: Radha Mohan which too went off-air days after it getting off-aired. The series stars Arjun Bijlani and Nikki Sharma as Shiv and Shakti respectively. After running for more than a year the series concluded on 18 August 2024.

== Plot ==
Shakti Sharma is a kind woman who aspires to be a doctor. After losing her parents, she lives with her uncle, aunt and cousin in Varanasi. Shiv Kashyap is a doctor, who has a hurting past and is unable to heal. The series follows Shiv and Shakti's story, how they cross path and how Shakti becomes Shiv's strength.

Shiv and Shakti becomes friends after frequently meeting each other. Shiv has a tragic past which causes his hand to shiver while doing any operation. Shakti wants to become a doctor and Shiv helps him get admitted to the college which belonged to his grandfather Ramprasad Kashyap. Mandira, Shiv's evil aunt plots against Shiv and Shakti as because of their friendship her plans of destroying Shiv and Shakti's career backfires. Shiv and Shakti falls for each other while saving Rimjhim from a fraud guy. Shiv and Shakti and Keertan and Rimjhim finally marry. Mandira brings out Shiv's past in front of Shakti and creates misunderstandings between them.

Initially, Shakti was angry because Shiv has hidden the truth. Shiv loses his control and wreaks havoc. But lately Shakti realises Mandira's conspiracy and tries to win Shiv back. Actually Shiv was first married to Gauri but was killed by Mandira after her real intentions revealed in front of her. But she made it look like it happened because of Gayatri (Shiv's mother) and made Shiv felt guilty. They had a son Kartik whom they sent to hostel. In present Shakti tries to win over Kartik and then Shiv. She continues her studies and also bonds with Kartik slowly tries to win over Shiv's heart. Shakti faces various challenges led by Mandira. She gives fake medicine to Shiv in order to keep him unwell and lose his control over his anger in front of Shakti. But Shakti controls him and later takes the responsibility of Shiv's medicine.

Keertan tortures Rimjhim. Love blossoms between Koyal and Dharam. Shiv realises that he misunderstood Shakti and decides to confess her. He came to take blessings from Gayatri but she is murdered by Mandira. Shiv was framed for the murder. Shiv pretends to be mentally unstable. Shakti tries to save him from the Police. Soon, Shiv and Shakti team up against Mandira and Mandira was soon exposed by them in front of the family. Mandira is finally imprisoned for her crimes.

Shiv, Shakti and Kartik are living happily with each other. With a supernatural turn Bhagwati learns from Ramkishore about an auspicious day when Moon and Sun would be seen together. Bhagwati fears about a secret which she hid from everyone. 25 years ago Shiv was a child and visited a village called Shivpur, where at the same day he saw a Naag and Naagin consummating he mistakenly kills a Naag Kundan (Mohini's lover) mistakenly who wanted to kill him. Mohini Kills Shiv in revenge. Bhagwati runs away with a dead Shiv and took help from a tantrik Baba. He revives Shiv by killing Kundan. Baba captives Mohini inside the earth putting a Trishula. It is estimated that if Shiv or any of Shiv's successor carrying Shiv's bloodline ever comes to Shivpur and takes off the Trishula then Mohini's curse will end and she will be freed. In present Shiv with Shakti and Kartik reaches Shivpur. Kartik picks off the Trishula and Mohini is freed. Disguising as a villager Mohini takes lift from Shiv and reaches Shiv's home. On the other hand, Koyal marries Dharam. Koyal faces difficulties in adjusting with the Sharma's.

Mohini kills Bhagwati, who had learned her real identity. Shakti suspects Mohini. She creates illusions and tries to prove Shakti mentally unstable.

== Cast ==
=== Main ===
- Arjun Bijlani as Dr. Shiv Kashyap: (2023–2024)
- Nikki Sharma as Shakti Sharma Kashyap: (2023–2024)

=== Recurring ===
- Dolly Chawla as Mohini Singh: (2024)
- Nimisha Vakharia as Manorama Sharma: (2023–2024)
- Phool Singh as Brijkishore Sharma: (2023–2024)
- Chinmay Patwardhan as Ravi Singh (2023–2024)
- Megha Singh as Janvi Sharma (2023–2024)
- Parineeta Borthakur as Mandira Kashyap (formerly Gargi Rameshwar Sharma): (2023–2024)
- Sanjay Swaraj as Raghunath Kashyap: (2023–2024)
- Seema Pandey as Gayatri Kashyap: (2023–2024)
- Ashman Kumar as Ayush Singh (2023–2024)
- Sandeep Sachdev as Kamalnath Kashyap: (2023–2024)
- Gaurav Wadhwa as Dr. Keertan Kashyap: (2023–2024)
- Aditi Patwa as Koyal Kashyap Sharma: (2023–2024)
- Jhuma Mitra as Padma Kashyap: (2023–2024)
- Vrushab Khadtale as Nandu Kashyap: (2023–2024)
- Meenakshi Verma as Bhagwati Kashyap: (2023–2024)
- Aan Tiwari as Kartik Kashyap: (2024)
- Prince Dhiman as Dharam Sharma: (2023–2024)
- Reva Kaurase as Rimjhim Sharma Kashyap: (2023–2024)
- Darsh Mody as Ranjan Mishra:(2023)
- Ssumier Pasricha as Purnendu (2023–2024)
- Ravi Bhatia as Naag: Mohini's brother (2024)

=== Guest appearances ===
- Niharika Roy as Radha Sharma Trivedi: (2023)
- Shabir Ahluwalia as Mohan Trivedi: (2023)

== Production ==
=== Development ===
The series was announced by Studio LSD Private Limited. The show showcases a modern-day interpretation of the Shiv-Shakti dynamic.

=== Casting ===
Arjun Bijlani was cast as the male lead Shiv, who is a doctor. Nikki Sharma was cast as the female lead Shakti, who is an aspiring doctor. Nimisha Vakharia was cast as Shakti's aunt while, Gaurav Wadhwa cast to play Shiv's brother. Parineeta Borthakur was cast to play Shiv's aunt Mandira, the negative lead.

=== Filming ===
The series is set in Varanasi. It is mainly shot in Varanasi and at Film City, Mumbai. Shabir Ahluwalia and Niharika Roy of Pyar Ka Pehla Naam: Radha Mohan, also shot for the series in Varanasi.
