= Keshav Pandit =

17th-century Sanskrit scholar and poet

Keshav Swami Purohit (died 1690), also known as Keshav Pandit or Keshav Bhat Pandit, was Chhatrapati Shivaji's Rajpurohit (Religious chief) and a Sanskrit scholar and poet of his times. He was also the ‘Rajpurohit’ and Danadhyaksha of Sambhaji and Rajaram. Sambhaji's schooling took place under his guidance.

== Contribution to coronation ==
Keshav Pandit accompanied Shivaji’s secretary Balaji Awji in his campaign to Uttar Pradesh and Udaipur for obtaining Shivaji’s family history which was necessary for the coronation ceremony.

== Contribution to history ==
Keshav Pandit has written in Sanskrit poetical biographies of all the Chhatrapatis he had worked with. Especially, his book ‘Rajaram Charitam’ written in 1690, gives a detailed account of Rajaram’s secret flight to Gingee fort from Panhala fort through the areas occupied by the Mughal army. It is supposed to be the most reliable source of Rajaram's escape as Keshav Pandit himself was one of the participants of this journey. The original book is kept intact in the royal library of Tanjavur. Soon after completion of this book, Keshav Pandit died at Gingee approximately at the age of 60. His heirs are staying in the villages near Devrukh in Ratnagiri district with the surname 'Purohit'. Most of them have now shifted to Ratnagiri, Thane and Pune.

== His works ==
- Shivaji’s biography in Sanskrit
- Sambhaji’s biography in Sanskrit
- Rajaram’s biography ‘Rajaram Charitam’ in Sanskrit
- 'Dandneeti' (Sanskrit) i.e. Criminal Code proposed for Maratha Empire
