= Vikram Singh Chauhan =

Indian television actor

- Born: Dehradun, Uttarakhand, India
- Occupation: Actor
- Years active: 2013–present
- Spouse: Sneha Shukla (m. 2021)
- Children: 1

Vikram Singh Chauhan is an Indian actor who primarily works in Hindi television. He made his acting debut in 2013, with Qubool Hai. Chauhan is best known for his portrayal of Atharv Sujata in Jaana Na Dil Se Door, Vyom Bedi in Ek Deewaana Tha and Aman Khan in Yehh Jadu Hai Jinn Ka!. He has since received recognition with Mardaani 2 (2019) and Pooja Meri Jaan (2026).

== Early and personal life ==
Chauhan was born and brought up in Dehradun.

Chauhan married his longtime girlfriend Sneha Shukla, a corporate lawyer, on 27 April 2021 in his hometown Dehradun. The couple had their first child, a baby girl named Sia, on 2 May 2022.

== Career ==
Chauhan made his debut in 2013 with Qubool Hai as Imran Qureshi. Next, he appeared in Million Dollar Girl as Virat Thakur and Ek Hasina Thi as Rishi Singh.

From 2016 to 2017, he played Atharva Vashisht in Star Plus's Jaana Na Dil Se Door opposite Shivani Surve. From 2017 to 2018, he portrayed Vyom Bedi / Akash Khurana in Sony Entertainment Television's Ek Deewaana Tha with Donal Bisht.

Since October 2019 to 2020, Chauhan had played the role of Aman Junaid Khan in Star Plus's Yehh Jadu Hai Jinn Ka! with Aditi Sharma. Chauhan made his Hindi film debut by playing the role of Anup Singh, a police officer in Rani Mukerji starrer Mardaani 2, released in 2022 and produced by Yash Raj Films. In 2022, he also played Ashok Nikose, a cop in a web series named Rudra: The Edge of Darkness.

In March 2026, Chauhan returned to television after six years, playing Shivaay Pandey in Colors TV's Do Duniya Ek Dil along with Rachi Sharma.

== Filmography ==
Key
†	Denotes films that have not yet been released

=== Films ===
Year	Title	Role	Notes	Ref.
2015	The Perfect Girl	Kartik Sharma		
2019	Mardaani 2	Inspector Anup Singhal		
2019	Kesari	Sep. Heera Singh		
2026	Pooja Meri Jaan	Aniket Shrivastava		

=== Television ===
Year	Title	Role	Notes	Ref.
2013–2014	Qubool Hai	Imran Qureshi		
2014	Ek Hasina Thi	Rishi Singh		
2014	Savdhaan India	Arun Bhasin	Episodic role	
2014	Million Dollar Girl	Virat Thakur		
2015	Twist Wala Love	Farhan Ali		
2016–2017	Jaana Na Dil Se Door	Atharv Sujata		
2017–2018	Ek Deewaana Tha	Vyom Bedi / Akash Khurana		
2019–2020	Yehh Jadu Hai Jinn Ka!	Aman Junaid Khan		
2026	Do Duniya Ek Dil	Shivaay Pandey		

=== Web series ===
Year	Title	Role	Notes	Ref.
2019–2020	Baarish	Aniket Karmakar		
2021	Chattis Aur Maina	Chattis Singh		
2022	Rudra: The Edge of Darkness	Captain Ashok Nikose		
2024	Raat Jawaan Hai	Satwinder "Sattu" Singh Gulati		
2025	Sena: Gardian Of The Nation	Captain Kartik Sharma		

== Awards and nominations ==
Year	Award	Category	Work	Result	Ref.
2013	Gold Awards	Best Actor in a Negative Role	Qubool Hai	Nominated	
2016	Indian Television Academy Awards	Best Actor (Drama)	Jaana Na Dil Se Door	Nominated	
2018	Gold Awards	Best Actor in a Negative Role	Ek Deewaana Tha	Nominated	
2026	Bright OTT and Style Awards	Best Actor	Sena: Gardian Of The Nation	Won	
