= Ankit Siwach =

Indian actor

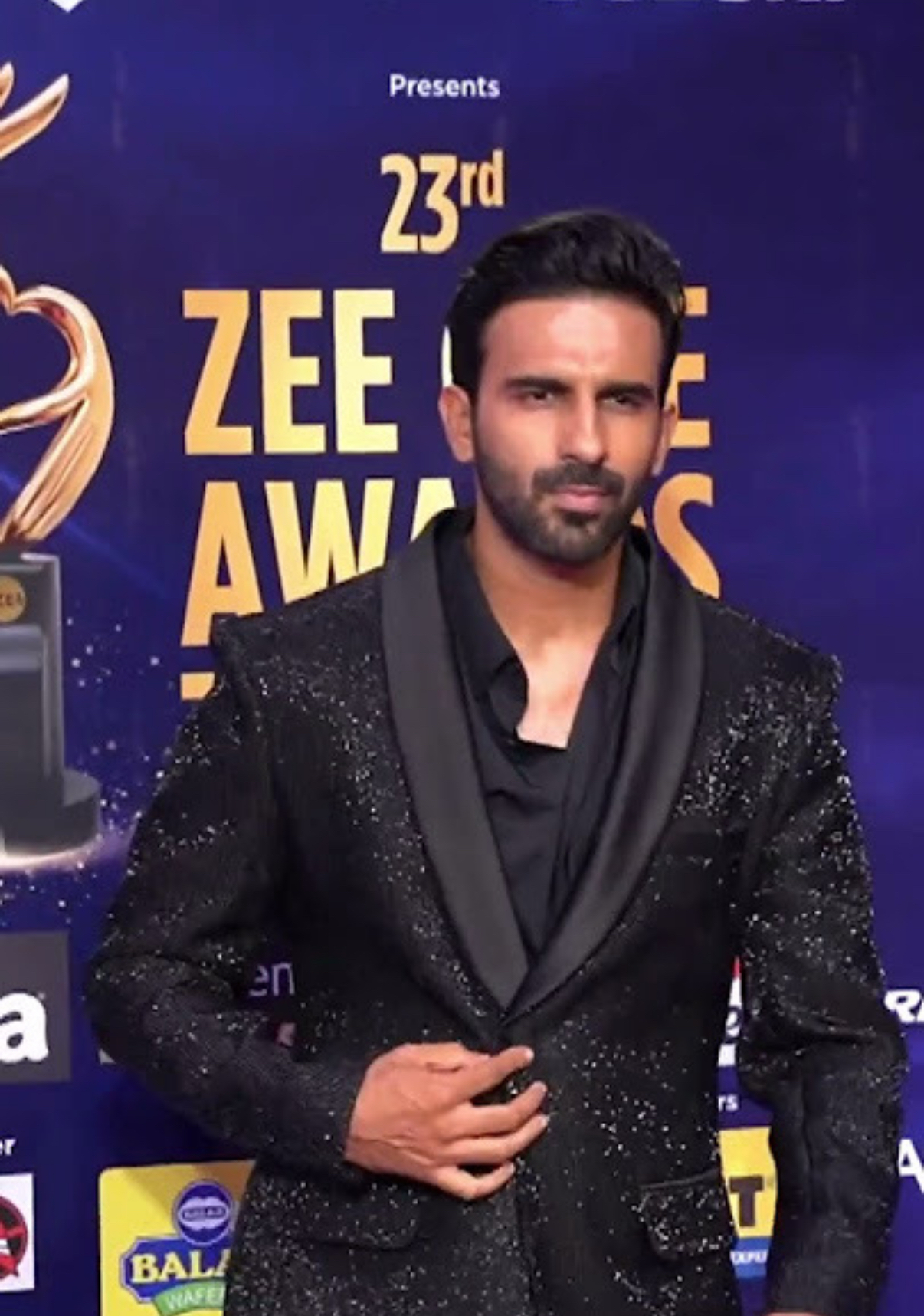
- Siwach in 2025
- Born: January 23, 1991 (age 35); Meerut, Uttar Pradesh, India
- Education: St. Mary's Academy, Meerut College of Vocational Studies, Delhi University Amity Business School
- Occupation: Actor
- Years active: 2017—present
- Spouse: Nupur Bhatia (m. 2020)

Ankit Siwach is an Indian actor known for his work in Hindi films and television.

== Career ==
Siwach began his television career in 2017 with the leading role of Inspector Adhiraj Pandey in Star Plus' Rishton Ka Chakravyuh. In 2018, he appeared in a cameo role for Star Plus' Ishqbaaaz and an episodic role for &TV's Laal Ishq. Starting Nov 2018 to Nov 2019, he played the lead role of Ram/Rana Bhanu Pratap Singh in Zee TV's Manmohini.

In 2020, he portrayed the role of Vikram Jai Singh in Sony TV's Beyhadh 2. In August 2020, he produced and was seen as the host in Epic TV's Safarnama. In 2021, he played the role of Vyom in Voot's popular web series Ishq Mein Marjawan 2: Naya Safar. In March 2022, he portrayed the main lead Armaan in StarPlus' show Yeh Jhuki Jhuki Si Nazar.

In 2025, he gained critical acclaim for the role of CBI Officer Bhagwan Sharad Ramteke in Disney Star's web series Kull: The Legacy of the Raisingghs.

In June 2025, Ankit represented his film Madam Driver at the prestigious New York Indian Film Festival. As Hassan, Ankit impressed audiences with his nuanced portrayal of a resilient, soft-spoken man navigating life’s challenges with quiet strength. His heartfelt performance earned him praise for bringing depth and authenticity to the character.

Ankit played the role of Ramlal Yadav in Excel Entertainment’s 120 Bahadur alongside Farhan Akhtar, released on 21st November 2025.. His portrayal of Ramlal was praised by audience and critics.

Ankit Siwach has been featured twice in The Times 20 Most Desirable Men on Television list.

== Filmography ==
=== Television ===
| Year | Title | Role | Notes |
|---|---|---|---|
| 2017–2018 | Rishton Ka Chakravyuh | Adhiraj Pandey | Lead role |
| 2018 | Ishqbaaaz | Farhan Qureshi | Cameo |
| 2018 | Laal Ishq | Prabhu | |
| 2018–2019 | Manmohini | Ram/Rana Bhanu Pratap Singh | Lead role |
| 2020 | Beyhadh 2 | Vikram Jai Singh | |
| 2020 | Safarnama | Host | Also producer |
| 2022 | Yeh Jhuki Jhuki Si Nazar | Armaan Rastogi | Lead role |
| 2023 | Pyaar Ka Pehla Naam Radha Mohan | KK | Cameo |

=== Web series ===
| Year | Title | Role | Streaming On | Ref |
|---|---|---|---|---|
| 2021 | Ishq Mein Marjawan 2: Naya Safar | Vyom | | |
| 2025 | Kull: The Legacy of the Raisingghs | CBI Officer Bhagwan Sharad Ramteke | Jio Hotstar | |
| 2026 | Dhaai Chaal | | Jio Hotstar | |

=== Film ===
| Year | Title | Role | Notes | Ref |
|---|---|---|---|---|
| 2021 | Khidki | | | |
| 2025 | Madam Driver | Hassan | | |
| 2025 | 120 Bahadur | Ramlal Yadav | | |

=== Music videos ===
| Year | Title | Singer(s) | Label | Ref |
|---|---|---|---|---|
| 2022 | Glass Khali | Pratibha Sharma | Zee Music Company | |
| 2023 | Kenda Hai Tu | Pratibha Sharma | Panorama Music | |
| 2023 | Mehfilein | Ravish Sundriyal | One Creative Man | |
| 2025 | Aakhiri | Ravish Sundriyal | One Creative Man | |
