= Reyhna Malhotra =

Indian actress

Reyhna Pandit
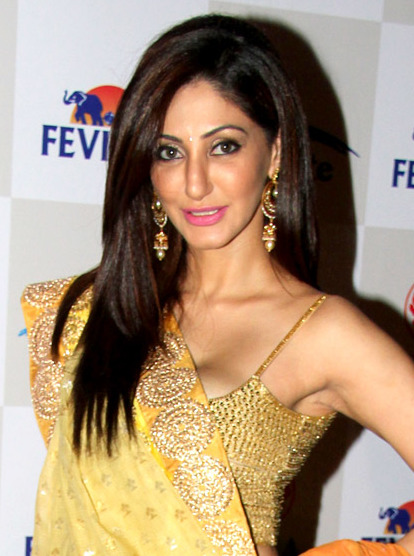
- Born: 1990 (age 35–36)
- Other name: Reyhna Pandit
- Occupations: Actress; Model
- Years active: 2014–present

Reyhna Malhotra, also known as Priyanka Pandit, is an Indian actress who is popular for her role as Mohini in Manmohini, Svetlana in Ishqbaaz and as Alia Mehra in Kumkum Bhagya which is longest running serial of ZeeTv.

== Personal life ==
Malhotra was in a relationship with actor Zeeshan Khan, who is a decade younger than her, from 2021 to early 2023. In a 2026 podcast with Siddharth Kannan, Malhotra described the relationship as traumatic and alleged that she was "suggested to convert" to Khan's Islamic faith.

== Filmography ==
=== Television ===
Year	Title	Role
2014–16	Jamai Raja	Samaira Patel
2015	Gulmohar Grand	Jasmine
2016	D4 - Get Up and Dance	Sweety (Cameo)
2016–18	Ishqbaaaz	Svetlana Kapoor
2016–17	Ichhapyaari Naagin	Vishali / Amrita
2017	Dil Boley Oberoi	Svetlana Kapoor
2017	Iss Pyaar Ko Kya Naam Doon 3	Svetlana Kapoor
2017	Woh Apna Sa	Tamara
2018–19	Manmohini	Mohini
2019–20	Manmohini 2	Sunanda
2020–2023	Kumkum Bhagya	Alia Mehra

.

=== Films ===
Year	Title	Role	Language
2014	Babloo Happy Hai	Gazala	Hindi
2014	Antha Scene Ledu	Sitara	Telugu
2017	2016 The End	Sandy	Hindi
2017	Jackpot	Unknown	Urdu
2017	The Final Exit	Alina	Hindi

=== Music videos ===
Year	Title	Singer(s)	Label	Ref.
2017	Superstar	Sukhe, Musical Doctors, Divya Bhatt	T-Series	
2018	Hunter	DJ Flow	Speed Records	
