= List of awards and nominations received by Jennifer Winget =

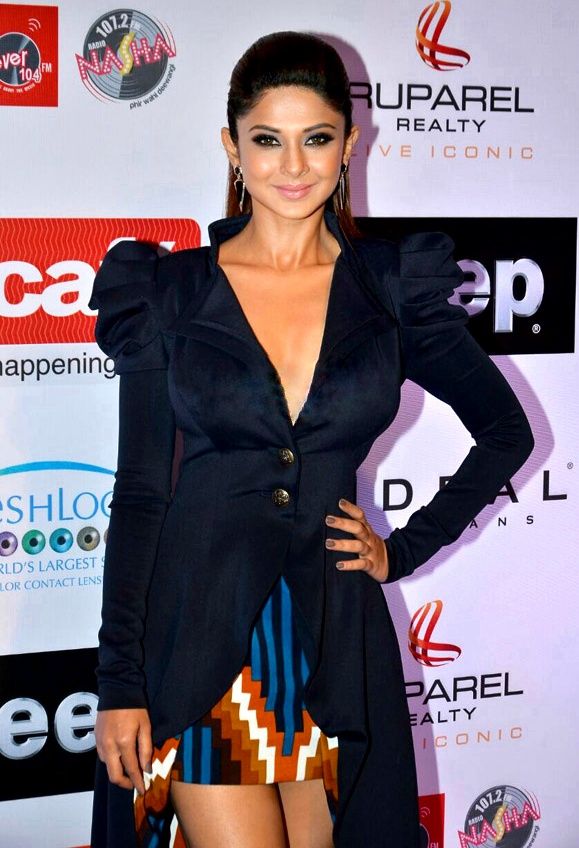
Winget in 2017

Jennifer Winget is an Indian television actress, known for her roles as Sneha Bajaj in Kasautii Zindagii Kay, Ganga Bhatia in Sangam and Dr. Riddhima Gupta in Dill Mill Gayye. Winget established herself as an actress with her portrayal of Kumud Sundari Desai in Saraswatichandra, Maya Mehrotra in the psychological thriller series Beyhadh and Zoya Siddiqui in romantic drama series Bepannah. Winget has won many awards mostly for Saraswatichandra and Bepannah.

== Indian Television Academy Awards ==
The Indian Television Academy Awards, also known as the (ITA Awards) is an annual event organised by the Indian Television Academy. The awards are presented in various categories, including popular programming (music, news, entertainment, sports, travel, lifestyle and fashion), best television channel in various categories, technical awards, and Best Performance awards.

Year	Category	Show	Character	Result	Ref.
2013	Best Actress (Popular)	Saraswatichandra	Kumud Desai Vyas	Nominated	
2013	Best Actress (Drama)	Saraswatichandra	Kumud Desai Vyas	Won	
2017	Best Actress (Jury)	Beyhadh	Maya Mehrotra	Won	
2018	Best Actress (Popular)	Bepannah	Zoya Siddiqui	Nominated	
2018	Best Actress (Drama)	Bepannah	Zoya Siddiqui	Nominated	

== Indian Telly Awards ==
The 'Indian Telly Awards' are annual honours presented by the company of Indian Television to persons and organisations in the television industry of India. The Awards are given in several categories such as best programme or series in a specific genre, best television channel in a particular category, most popular actors and awards for technical roles such as writers and directors.

Year	Category	Show	Character	Result	Ref.
2007	Best Supporting Actress	Kasautii Zindagii Kay	Sneha Basu Gill	Nominated	
2014	Best Actress (Jury)	Saraswatichandra	Kumud Desai Vyas	Won	
2014	Best Actress in a Lead Role	Saraswatichandra	Kumud Desai Vyas	Nominated	
2019	Best Actress in Lead Role	Bepannah	Zoya Siddiqui	Won	
2019	Best Jodi (With Harshad Chopda)	Bepannah	Zoya Siddiqui	Nominated	

== Gold Awards ==
The Zee Gold Awards (also known as the Gold Television or Boroplus Awards) are honours presented excellence in the television industry. The Awards are given in several categories.

Year	Category	Show	Character	Result	Ref.
2013	Most Fit Actress	—N/a	—N/a	Won	
2018	Best Actress (Jury)	Bepannah	Zoya Siddiqui	Won	

== Asiavision Television Awards ==
Year	Category	Show	Character	Result	Ref.
2016	Best Actress	Saraswatichandra	Kumud Desai Vyas	Won	

== Asian Viewers Television Awards ==
Year	Category	Show	Character	Result	Ref.
2016	Best Actress of the Year	Saraswatichandra	Kumud Desai Vyas	Nominated	
2018	Best Actress of the Year	Bepannah	Zoya Siddiqui	Nominated	
2019	Best Actress of the Year	Bepannah	Zoya Siddiqui	Nominated	

== Filmfare OTT Awards ==
Year	Category	Show	Character	Result	Ref.
2020	Best Actor Series: Drama (Female)	Code M	Major Monica Mehra	Nominated	

== Bollywood Hungama Style Icons ==
Year	Category	Show	Character	Result	Ref.
2023	Most Stylish TV Actor (Female)	—N/a	—N/a	Nominated	
