= Cinevistaas Limited =

Indian media production house

- Type: Public
- Traded as: BSE: 532324; NSE: CINEVISTA
- Founded: 1 January 1993 (Private); 20 December 1999 (Public)
- Founder: Prem Krishen Malhotra (EC); Sunil Mehta (CEO, MD)
- Headquarters: Mumbai, Maharashtra, India
- Area served: Worldwide
- Key people: Prem Krishen Malhotra, Sunil Mehta, K. B. Nair, Siddharth Malhotra
- Website: www.cinevistaas.com

Cinevistaas Limited, formerly known as Cinevista Communications Limited, is an Indian production house founded by Prem Krishen. Based in Mumbai, Maharashtra, it is known for producing successful shows like Crime Patrol, Sanjivani, Dill Mill Gayye, Dil Dosti Dance, Ek Hazaaron Mein Meri Behna Hai, Ek Hasina Thi, Beyhadh, and Bepannah.

== History ==
The company was formed on 1 January 1993 by Prem Krishen and Sunil Mehta as a Partnership firm known as 'Cinevista Communications' but was subsequently incorporated as a Private Limited Company as 'Cinevista Communications Private Limited' under Part IX of the Companies Act, 1956 and became a Public Limited Company on 20 December 1999 as 'Cinevista Communications Limited'. In 2016, one of the key producers, Sidharth Malhotra moved out of Cinevistaas and started his own production company. In 2018, on the sets of Bepannaah, a fire broke out, it has been said that fire safety equipment was not working in the studio, and the studio did not submit a mandatory working check for the fire fighting systems, hence they were disallowed to shoot until proper fire safety is put in place, during the fire a 20 year old assistant also died.

== Productions ==
The company has produced the following television and films:

=== Television ===
Title	Channel
Aap Ki Taarif	DD Metro
Aati Rahengi Baharein	Zee TV
Apni Khushian Apne Gham	SAB TV
Ayushmaan	Sony TV
Beyhadh	Sony TV
Bepannaah	Colors TV
Best Friends Forever	Channel V
Crime Patrol	Sony TV
Deewarein	Star Plus
Dharam Aur Hum	Star Plus
Dil Dosti Dance	Channel V
Dil Apna Preet Parayee	DD National
Dill Mill Gayye	STAR One
Dilli Wali Thakur Gurls	&TV
Door Door Doorbeen	Hungama TV
Draupadi	Sahara One
Ek Tukda Chaand Ka	Zee TV
Ek Hasina Thi	Star Plus
Ek Hazaaron Mein Meri Behna Hai	Star Plus
Ghutan	DD National
Gul Gulshan Gulfaam	DD National
Hamari Betiyoon Ka Vivaah	Zee TV
Hindustani	DD Metro
Hum Hain Kal Aaj Aur Kal	Metro Gold/Star Plus
Jaane Bhi Do Paro	DD Metro
Jaane Kya Baat Hui	Colors TV
Jaane Pehchaane Se Ye Ajnabbi	STAR One
Jai Mata Ki	DD National
Jersey No. 10	SAB TV
Junoon	Doordarshan
Kabhi Aise Geet Gaya Karo	Disney Channel
Kaisi Laagi Lagan	Sahara One
Katha Sagar	DD National
Kati Patang Hai Life Yaaron	DD National
Khatta Meetha	DD Metro
Kohinoor	Sahara One
Krisshna Arjun	Star Plus
Lo Ho Gayi Pooja Iss Ghar Ki	SAB TV
LOC:Life Out Of Control	Star Plus
Mahabharatham	Sun TV
Mamla Gadbad Hai	Metro Gold/Star Plus
Manzil	Star Plus
Music Station	DD Metro
Naam Ki Loteri Apna Hai	Star Plus
Nehle Pe Dehla	DD National
Noorjahan	DD National
Paalkhi	Zee TV
Pyaar Vyaar and All That	MTV India
Saahil	DD Metro
Saaksshi	Sony TV
Saathiya	Sahara One
Saboot	Star Plus
Sanjivani	Star Plus
Sanskruti	Star Plus
Shubh Kadam	Sahara One
Ssshhhh...Koi Hai	Star Plus
Tera Mujhse Hai Pehle Ka Naata Koi	Sony TV
Veer	Hungama TV
Vicky & Vetaal	Disney Channel India
Vicky Aur Vetaal	Disney Channel India
Vikraal Aur Gabraal	Star Plus
Yahaan Ke Hum Sikander	Zee Next
Yeh Teri Galiyan	Zee TV
Zara Hatke Zara Bachke	STAR Plus
Zindagi	DD National
Zindagi Milke Bitayenge	Metro Gold/Star Plus
Zindagi Wins	Bindass

=== Films ===
Title	Year
Garv: Pride and Honour	2004
Sssshhh...	2003
Yeh Mohabbat Hai	2002
Praying with Anger	1992

== Awards and nominations ==
Year	Award	Category	Nominee	Show	Result	Source
2008	Kalakar Awards	Best Promising Star	Karan Singh Grover	Dill Mill Gayye	Won	
2008	Indian Telly Awards	Best Actor in a Leading Role	Karan Singh Grover	Dill Mill Gayye	Nominated	
2008	Indian Telly Awards	Best Ensemble	Dill Mill Gayye	Dill Mill Gayye	Nominated	
2008	Indian Television Academy Awards	Best On-Screen Couple	Karan Singh Grover & Shilpa Anand	Dill Mill Gayye	Won	
2009	Indian Television Academy Awards	Best Singer	Sonu Nigam	Dill Mill Gayye	Won	
2010	Indian Telly Awards	Best Youth Show	Dill Mill Gayye	Dill Mill Gayye	Won	
2010	Indian Telly Awards	Fresh New Face	Neha Jhulka	Dill Mill Gayye	Nominated	
2010	Indian Telly Awards	Best Actor in a Comic Role	Prasad Barve	Dill Mill Gayye	Nominated	
2018	Gold Awards	Best Actor Male	Harshad Chopda	Bepannah	Nominated	
2018	Gold Awards	Best Actor Female	Jennifer Winget	Bepannah	Nominated	
2018	Gold Awards	Best Actor Female (Critics)	Jennifer Winget	Bepannah	Won	
2018	Gold Awards	Best Onscreen Jodi	Harshad Chopda & Jennifer Winget	Bepannah	Nominated	
2018	Gold Awards	Best Actress In A Negative Role	Vaishnavi Dhanraj	Bepannah	Nominated	
2018	Gold Awards	Best Show	Bepannaah	Bepannah	Nominated	
2018	Indian Television Academy Awards	Best Actor (Popular)	Harshad Chopda	Bepannah	Won	
2018	Indian Television Academy Awards	Best Actress (Popular)	Jennifer Winget	Bepannah	Nominated	
2018	Indian Television Academy Awards	Best Show (Popular)	Bepannaah	Bepannah	Won	
2018	Indian Television Academy Awards	Best Actress (Jury)	Jennifer Winget	Bepannah	Nominated	
2018	Indian Television Academy Awards	Best Actress In A Negative Role	Parineeta Borthakur	Bepannah	Nominated	
2018	Indian Television Academy Awards	Best Show (Jury)	Bepannaah	Bepannah	Nominated	
2018	Indian Television Academy Awards	Best Director (Jury)	Aniruddha Rajderkar	Bepannah	Won	
2018	Indian Television Academy Awards	Best Singer	Rahul Jain	Bepannah	Nominated	
2018	Indian Television Academy Awards	Best Song Track	Rahul Jain	Bepannah	Nominated	
2018	Indian Television Academy Awards	Best Lyricist	Rahul Jain	Bepannah	Nominated	
2018	Asian Viewers Television Awards	Male Actor Of The Year	Harshad Chopda	Bepannah	Won	
2018	Asian Viewers Television Awards	Female Actor Of The Year	Jennifer Winget	Bepannah	Nominated	
2018	Asian Viewers Television Awards	Soap Of The Year	Bepannaah	Bepannah	Nominated	
2019	Lions Gold Awards	Best Actor (Popular)	Harshad Chopda	Bepannah	Won	
2019	Lions Gold Awards	Best Actress (Popular)	Jennifer Winget	Bepannah	Won	
2019	Lions Gold Awards	Best Supporting Actor (Male)	Rajesh Khattar	Bepannah	Won	
2019	Indian Telly Awards	Best Actor In Lead Role (Popular)	Harshad Chopda	Bepannah	Nominated	
2019	Indian Telly Awards	Best Actress In Lead Role (Popular)	Jennifer Winget	Bepannah	Won	
2019	Indian Telly Awards	Best Jodi (Popular)	Harshad Chopda & Jennifer Winget	Bepannah	Nominated	
2019	Indian Telly Awards	Best Actor In Supporting Role (Popular)	Shehzad Shaikh	Bepannah	Nominated	
2019	Indian Telly Awards	Best Actor In Negative Role (Popular)	Rajesh Khattar	Bepannah	Won	
2019	Indian Telly Awards	Best Actress In Negative Role (Popular)	Parineeta Borthakur	Bepannah	Nominated	
2019	Indian Telly Awards	Best Daily Series (Popular)	Bepannaah	Bepannah	Nominated	
2019	Indian Television Academy Awards	Best Actor (Popular)	Harshad Chopda	Bepannah	Won	
2019	Asian Viewers Television Awards	Male Actor Of The Year	Harshad Chopda	Bepannah	Won	

== Sources ==
- Interview with television and film producer Prem Kishen
- Cinevistaas Limited at Google Finance
