= Saraswatichandra (TV series) =

Indian television series

- Genre: Soap opera
- Created by: Sanjay Leela Bhansali (initial episodes)
- Based on: Saraswatichandra by Govardhanram Tripathi
- Written by: Shruti Vaidya; Utkarsh Naithani; Saba Mumtaz; Gautam Hegde; Ved Raj; Abhijit Sinha; Shilpa D'Mello
- Directed by: Arvind Babbal; Sharad Pandey; Mayank Gupta; Himanshu Singh; Arshad Khan
- Starring: Gautam Rode; Jennifer Winget; Varun Kapoor; Monica Bedi
- Theme music composer: Aadil-Prashant
- Opening theme: "Kuch Na Kahe" by Shreya Ghoshal and Javed Ali
- Country of origin: India
- Original language: Hindi
- No. of episodes: 403

Production
- Producers: Sanjay Leela Bhansali; Sunjoy Waddhwa; Comall Sunjoy W.
- Cinematography: Deepak Pandey; Arjun Rao
- Running time: 22 minutes
- Production companies: SLB productions (2013); Sphere Origins (2013–2014)

Original release
- Network: STAR Plus
- Release: 25 February 2013 – 20 September 2014

Saraswatichandra, international title: Saras and Kumud, is an Indian Hindi-language romantic drama television series that was initially produced by Sanjay Leela Bhansali. It is based on Saraswatichandra by Govardhanram Tripathi. It aired on Star Plus from 25 February 2013 to 20 September 2014.

Due to issues arising from the original production company, in August 2013, Saraswatichandra switched its production house to Sphere Origins.

== Plot ==
Young aristocrat Saraswatichandra Laxminandan Vyas, a.k.a. Saras, who lives in Dubai is introverted due to his mother's suicide and rejects an arranged marriage by his father with his friend Vidyachatur Desai's daughter Kumud, informing her by letter. She challenges him to inform her father and so Saras travels to her village named Ratnanagari in Ahmedabad district, Gujarat, India, gains familiarity with her family and gradually falls in love with her. On his return to Dubai, Saras finds a letter from his mother Saraswati, explaining that she committed suicide due to his father having an affair with Ghuman. That letter was written by his step mother Ghuman. Saras disowns his father and decides not to marry Kumud because he cannot support her without his family's wealth.

To save her family's reputation, Kumud rushes into a marriage with Pramad, the son of a politician. Saras realizes his mistake and tries to stop the wedding, but is beaten up by thugs. Kumud finds that her husband is an abusive alcoholic but resolves to change him. Pramad's sister Alak finds Saras and brings him to the family home to recover. Saras vows to change Pramad's ways. Pramad's father also wants Pramad to change, and hires Saras as his secretary which makes Pramad jealous.

Pramad pretends to be a changed man, but tries to kill Kumud with the help of maid Kalika. Saras rescues Kumud, who separates from Pramad and returns to her family home. However, Kalika enters the household by marrying Kumud's cousin Yash. Pramad attempts to abduct Kumud but his goons take her sister Kusum. Saras saves Kusum, who develops feelings for him but agrees to marry another. Pramad sends evidence of Kusum's kidnapping to the groom's family, who call off the wedding. To save the family's reputation, Kumud convinces her family to allow Saras to marry Kusum. Saras agrees, but plots to have Kusum married to his younger step brother Danny, who loves her. Kusum gradually recognizes Danny's love and returns his feelings. Pramad travels abroad for medical treatment, abandoning Kumud and facilitating her divorce. Kumud marries Saras, who reconciles with his father Laxminandan. Laxminandan meets with an accident with car of a man, Kabir.

After the wedding, Kabir helps the families when Laxminandan falls into a coma. Kabir is secretly working for Saras's stepmother Ghuman to create problems between Danny, Kusum and Saras in order to gain Laxminandan's wealth. Actually he is pretending to help Ghuman to take revenge from her. Kumud finds out Kabir's truth. Kumud learns about Ghuman's elder sister Menaka and Ghuman's secret. Kumud goes to that place where Ghuman used to work as a dancer before marrying Laxminandan. Kumud is kidnapped and again rescued by Saras. Ghuman's friend Sunanda reveals to Saras and Kumud that Ghuman had paid a governess to kill a baby 21 years earlier. Vidyachatur's younger sister Dugba who was Saraswati's friend tells Saras and Kumud after that Saraswati was pregnant for a second time but she suffered a miscarriage and Laxminandan blamed her for the miscarriage, that's why she killed herself. Then she searches in that hospital in which Saraswati was admitted at the time of her delivery. She learns that her baby was alive and was swapped with a stillborn baby and Dugba tells this to Saras and Kumud. They doubt Ghuman. Saras and Kumud confront Menaka for her and Ghuman's secret and Menaka reveals Kabir's identity as Saras's younger brother, thought to have died in infancy, and that he is actually seeking vengeance on Ghuman for separating him from his family. He was raised by Menaka because Menaka wanted to take revenge from Ghuman and to take her property. Ghuman learns of this and has Kabir kidnapped in London, with Saras and Kumud going to save him. Meanwhile, Ghuman uses Kalika to try to separate Danny and Kusum. Kalika reveals the truth and is divorced and disowned by Yash. Ghuman tries to kill Saras, Kumud and Kabir, but they are saved. Laxminandan awakens and disowns Ghuman, who is arrested. Saras and Kabir both reconcile with their father.

Saras and Kumud move to Mumbai for a business project for six months. Their landlord Prashant Tyagi becomes obsessed with Kumud, who is a lookalike of his girlfriend he murdered. The landlord kidnaps them both and tries to murder Saras, but they find evidence and have him arrested.

During Kabir's wedding to Kusum's friend Anushka, a young man attempts to kill Saras and Kumud, extorting Anushka's cooperation because he had kidnapped her younger brother Avinash and blackmailed her. Saras is hospitalized saving Kumud and Kabir breaks off the engagement. Kabir and Danny save Avinash, and Kabir forgives Anushka. Ghuman is revealed to be behind the plot.

Ghuman feigns mental illness and is transferred from jail to a mental asylum, where she finds her rival, Saras's mother Saraswati who is alive and suffering amnesia. Ghuman informs Kumud but still tries to take revenge. Kumud helps Saraswati regain her memory and mental health, and the family is reunited. Ghuman is returned to jail. Saras and Kumud have their first child. They named her Sanskriti Saraswatichandra Vyas.

== Cast ==
=== Main ===
- Jennifer Winget as Kumud Desai Vyas: Guniyal and Vidyachatur's daughter; Kusum's sister; Pramadan’s ex-wife; Saraswatichandra's wife; Sanskriti's mother (2013-2014)
- Gautam Rode as Saraswatichandra "Saras" Vyas: Saraswati and Laxminandan's son; Ghuman's stepson; Kabir's brother; Danny's half-brother; Kumud's husband; Sanskriti's father (2013-2014)

=== Recurring ===
- Varun Kapoor as Danny Vyas: Ghuman and Laxminandan's son; Saras and Kabir's half-brother; Kusum's husband (2013–2014)
- Shiny Doshi as Kusum Desai Vyas: Guniyal and Vidyachatur's younger daughter; Kumud's sister; Yash and Kumari's cousin; Mohan's ex-fiancée; Danny's wife (2013–2014)
- Ashish Kapoor as Kabir Vyas: Saraswati and Laxminandan's younger son; Ghuman's stepson; Menaka's foster son; Saras' brother; Danny's half-brother; Anushka's husband (2014)
- Srishty Rode as Anushka Vyas: Kabir's wife (2014)
- Anshul Trivedi as Pramadan "Pramad" Dharmadhikari: Saubhagyavati Devi and Buddhidhan's son; Alak's brother; Kumud's ex-husband (2013)
- Chetan Pandit as Laxminandan Vyas: Saraswati's husband; Ghuman's ex-husband; Saras, Kabir and Danny's father; Vidyachatur's best friend (2013–2014)
- Maleeka Ghai as Saraswati Vyas: Laxminandan's first wife; Saras and Kabir's mother; Danny's stepmother; Dugba's best friend (2014)
- Monica Bedi as Ghuman Kaur (formerly Vyas): Menaka's sister; Laxminandan's ex-wife; Danny's mother; Saras and Kabir's stepmother (2013–2014)
- Yatin Karyekar / Aliraza Namdar as Vidyachatur Desai: Dugba and Gyanchatur's brother; Guniyal's husband; Kumud and Kusum's father; Laxminandan's best friend (2013–2014)/(2014)
- Alpana Buch as Guniyal Devi Desai: Vidyachatur's wife; Kumud and Kusum's mother (2013–2014)
- Ragini Shah as Dugba Desai: Vidyachatur and Gyanchatur's sister; Sahastrar's wife; Kumari's mother; Saraswati's best friend (2013–2014)
- Sanjay Bhatia as Sahastrar: Dugba's husband; Kumari's father (2013–2014)
- Vinita Mahesh as Kumari: Dugba and Sahastrar's daughter; Yash, Kumud and Kusum's cousin (2013–2014)
- Mehul Kajaria as Gyanchatur Desai: Vidyachatur and Dugba's brother; Chandrika's husband (2013–2014)
- Manasi Jain as Chandrika Kaur Desai: Gyanchatur's wife (2013–2014)
- Smita Shetty as Sunder Desai: Vidyachatur, Gyanchatur and Dugba's sister-in-law; Yash's mother (2013)
- Surya Kanth / Winy Tripathi as Yash Desai: Sunder's son; Kumud, Kusum and Kumari's cousin; Kalika's ex-husband (2013)/(2013–2014)
- Soni Singh as Kalika Das (formerly Desai): Murakh's daughter; Yash's ex-wife (2013–2014)
- Sonia Shah as Menaka Kaur: Ghuman's sister; Kabir's foster mother (2013–2014)
- Sai Ballal as Buddhidhan Dharmadhikari: Saubhagyawati Devi's husband; Pramad and Alak's father (2013)
- Pratichi Mishra as Saubhagyavati Devi Dharmadhikari: Buddhidhan's wife; Pramad and Alak's mother (2013)
- Vahbbiz Dorabjee as Alak Dharmadhikari: Saubhgyavati Devi and Buddhidhan's daughter; Pramad's sister; Indresh's wife (2013)
- Vijay Badlani as Indresh: Alak's husband (2013)
- Shahrukh Sadri as Murakh Das: Kalika's father; Dharmadhikari house's servant (2013–2014)
- Rahulram Manchanda as Prashant: Saras and Kumud's landlord in Mumbai (2014)
- Mithil Jain as Sub-Inspector Umesh Solanki: Kumari's ex-lover (2014)
- Varun Sharma as Mohan: Kusum's ex-fiancé (2014)
- Shivani Gosain as Sunanda: Ghuman's friend-turned-rival (2014)
- Menaka Lalwani as Aarati (2014)
- Manasi Parekh as Karuna (2014)

== Guest ==
- Karan Tacker as Viren from Ek Hazaaron Mein Meri Behna Hai (2013)
- Kushal Tandon as Virat from Ek Hazaaron Mein Meri Behna Hai (2013)
- Krystle D'Souza as Jeevika from Ek Hazaaron Mein Meri Behna Hai (2013)
- Nia Sharma as Manvi from Ek Hazaaron Mein Meri Behna Hai (2013)
- Mohammad Nazim as Ahem from Saath Nibhaana Saathiya (2013)
- Devoleena Bhattacharjee as Gopi from Saath Nibhaana Saathiya (2013)
- Anas Rashid as Sooraj from Diya Aur Baati Hum (2014)
- Deepika Singh Goyal as Sandhya from Diya Aur Baati Hum (2014)
- Karan Patel as Raman Bhalla from Yeh Hai Mohabbatein (2014)
- Divyanka Tripathi as Ishita Iyer Bhalla from Yeh Hai Mohabbatein (2014)
- Avinash Sachdev as Shlok Agnigotri from Iss Pyaar Ko Kya Naam Doon? Ek Baar Phir (2014)
- Shrenu Parikh as Astha Shlok Agnigotri from Iss Pyaar Ko Kya Naam Doon? Ek Baar Phir (2014)
- Hina Khan as Akshara from Yeh Rishta Kya Kehlata Hai (2014)
- Karan Mehra as Naitik from Yeh Rishta Kya Kehlata Hai (2014)

== Production ==
The production of the series began in May 2012.

The grand set of the series and the production cost ₹5.5 crore (55 million rupees). Initial scenes were shot in Dubai and Rajkot. In August 2013, Sphere Origins took over the production of the series from Sanjay Leela Bhansali Films Pvt Ltd, after which, in January 2014, the storyline deviated from the novel as Saras and Kumud marry.

== Reception ==
=== Critics ===
Hindustan Times said, "Style is good but substance is better."

=== Ratings ===
The series garnered an average rating of 2.5 TVR in its first episode and 2.1 TVR in the premiere week. However, the following weeks it improved.

== Awards and nominations ==
Year	Award	Category	Cast	Result	Ref
2013	Gold Awards	Best Actor	Gautam Rode	Nominated	
2013	Indian Television Academy Awards	Best Actress – Drama	Jennifer Winget	Won	
2013	Indian Television Academy Awards	Best Actress – Popular	Jennifer Winget	Nominated	
2013	Indian Television Academy Awards	Best Actor – Popular	Gautam Rode	Nominated	
2014	Gold Awards	Best Actor	Gautam Rode	Won	
2014	Indian Telly Awards	Best Actor in a Lead Role	Gautam Rode	Won	
2014	Indian Telly Awards	Best Actress (Jury)	Jennifer Winget	Won	
