= ITA Award for Best Actress Drama Jury =

Indian Television Academy award

ITA Award for Best Actress Drama
- Awarded for: Best Performance by an Actress Jury
- Sponsored by: Indian Television Academy
- First award: 2001
- Final award: 2025
- Recent winner: Priya Thakur

Highlights
- Total awarded: 25
- Most wins: Shweta Tiwari (5)
- First winner: Pallavi Joshi for Justujoo (2001)
- Latest winner: Priya Thakur for Vasudha (2025)
- Website: http://indiantelevisionacademy.com

ITA Award for Best Actress Drama Jury, also known as Best Actress Jury, is an award given by the Indian Television Academy jury as a part of its annual event.

== Superlatives ==
Actress with most awards	Shweta Tiwari	5
Actress with most nominations	Sakshi Tanwar	6
Actress with most nominations (without ever winning)	Shivangi Joshi and Rupali Ganguly	5
Character with most wins	Prerna Sharma	3

== Winners and nominations ==
=== 2000s ===
Year	Photo	Actress	Character	Show	Ref
2001		Pallavi Joshi	Leela	Justujoo	
2002		Achint Kaur	Malika Sareen	Dhadkan	
2003		Shweta Tiwari	Prerna Sharma	Kasautii Zindagii Kay	
2004		Geeta Nair	Vasudha	Haqeeqat	
2005		Mona Singh	Jasmeet Walia	Jassi Jaissi Koi Nahin	
2006		Shweta Tiwari	Prerna Sharma	Kasautii Zindagii Kay	
2007		Sarita Joshi	Godavari Thakkar	Baa Bahoo Aur Baby	
2008		Avika Gor	Anandi	Balika Vadhu	
2009		Ratan Rajput	Lali	Agle Janam Mohe Bitiya Hi Kijo	

=== 2010s ===
Year	Photo	Actress	Character	Show	Ref
2010		Surekha Sikri	Kalyani Devi	Balika Vadhu	
2011		Surekha Sikri	Kalyani Devi	Balika Vadhu	
2011		Sakshi Tanwar	Priya Kapoor	Bade Achhe Lagte Hain	
2012		Shweta Tiwari	Sweety Ahluwalia	Parvarrish – Kuchh Khattee Kuchh Meethi	
2013		Jennifer Winget	Kumud Desai	Saraswatichandra	
2014		Surekha Sikri	Kalyani Devi	Balika Vadhu	
2015		Shweta Tiwari	Bindiya Rani	Begusarai	
2016		Rubina Dilaik	Soumya Singh	Shakti - Astitva Ke Ehsaas Ki	
2016		Sakshi Tanwar	Shivani Malik	24 Season 2	
2016		Anuja Sathe	Dharaa Solanki	Tamanna	
2016		Deepika Singh	Sandhya Rathi	Diya Aur Baati Hum	
2016		Kratika Sengar	Tanushree	Kasam Tere Pyaar Ki	
2017		Jennifer Winget	Maya Mehrotra	Beyhadh	
2017		Shivangi Joshi	Naira Singhania	Yeh Rishta Kya Kehlata Hai	
2017		Amrita Puri	Harleen Kaur	P.O.W. - Bandi Yuddh Ke	
2017		Sandhya Mridul	Nazneen Khan	P.O.W. - Bandi Yuddh Ke	
2017		Narayani Shastri	Satrupa Baldev Singh	Rishton Ka Chakravyuh	
2017		Sriti Jha	Pragya Mehra	Kumkum Bhagya	
2018		Divyanka Tripathi	Ishita Iyer Bhalla	Yeh Hai Mohabbatein	
2018		Jennifer Winget	Zoya Siddiqui	Bepannah	
2018		Sriti Jha	Pragya Mehra	Kumkum Bhagya	
2018		Shivangi Joshi	Naira Singhania	Yeh Rishta Kya Kehlata Hai	
2018		Aditi Sharma	Dr. Mauli Malhotra	Silsila Badalte Rishton Ka	
2018		Surbhi Jyoti	Bela	Naagin 3	
2019		Sriti Jha	Pragya Arora	Kumkum Bhagya	
2019		Ashnoor Kaur	Mini	Patiala Babes	
2019		Roshni Walia	Tara	Tara From Satara	
2019		Anushka Sen	Lakshmi Bai	Jhansi Ki Rani	

=== 2020s ===
Year	Photo	Actress	Character	Show	Ref
2020		Shweta Tiwari	Guneet Sikka	Mere Dad Ki Dulhan	
2020		Shivangi Joshi	Naira Singhania	Yeh Rishta Kya Kehlata Hai	
2020		Sriti Jha	Pragya Arora	Kumkum Bhagya	
2020		Shraddha Arya	Preeta Arora	Kundali Bhagya	
2021		Ashi Singh	Meet Hooda	Meet: Badlegi Duniya Ki Reet	
2021		Alice Kaushik	Raavi Shah	Pandya Store	
2021		Shivangi Joshi	Anandi	Balika Vadhu 2	
2021		Gia Manek	Gopika	Tera Mera Saath Rahe	
2021		Nimrit Kaur Ahluwalia	Meher Kaur Dhillon	Choti Sarrdaarni	
2021		Rupali Ganguly	Anupamaa Joshi	Anupamaa	
2022		Disha Parmar	Priya Sood	Bade Achhe Lagte Hain 2	
2022		Ulka Gupta	Banni	Banni Chow Home Delivery	
2022		Karuna Pandey	Pushpa	Pushpa Impossible	
2022		Ayesha Singh	Sai Joshi	Ghum Hai Kisikey Pyaar Meiin	
2022		Rajshree Thakur	Pallavi	Appnapan – Badalte Rishton Ka Bandhan	
2022		Rupali Ganguly	Anupamaa Joshi	Anupamaa	
2023		Aditi Sharma	Katha Singh	Katha Ankahee	
2023		Shivangi Joshi	Aradhana Sahni	Barsatein – Mausam Pyaar Ka	
2023		Rupali Ganguly	Anupamaa Joshi	Anupamaa	
2023		Pranali Rathod	Akshara Goenka	Yeh Rishta Kya Kehlata Hai	
2023		Mugdha Chaphekar	Prachi Mehra	Kumkum Bhagya	
2024		Neha Harsora	Sailee	Udne Ki Aasha	
2024		Karuna Pandey	Pushpa	Pushpa Impossible	
2024		Trupti Mishra	Poonam Raghuvanshi	Qayaamat Se Qayaamat Tak	
2024		Rupali Ganguly	Anupamaa Joshi	Anupamaa	
2024		Amandeep Sidhu	Bani Arora	Badall pe paon hai	
2025		Priya Thakur	Vasudha Singh Chauhan	Vasudha	
2025		Rupali Ganguly	Anupamaa Joshi	Anupamaa	
2025		Shruti Bhist	Noyontara Sengupta	Noyontara	
2025		Smriti Irani	Tulsi Virani	Kyunki Saas Bhi Kabhi Bahu Thi 2	
2025		Sriti Jha	Amruta Bhavani Chitnis	Kaise Mujhe Tum Mil Gaye	
2025		Sumbul Touqeer	Anvita Diwekar	Itti Si Khushi	

== See also ==
- ITA Award for Best Actor Drama Jury
- ITA Award for Best Actress Drama Popular
- ITA Award for Best Actor Drama Popular
