= Gaurav Kumar =

Gaurav Kumar may refer to:

- Gaurav Kumar (cricketer)
- Gaurav Kumar (politician)
- Gaurav Kumar (kabaddi)
