= Ek Hazaaron Mein Meri Behna Hai =

Indian Hindi-language soap opera

- Genre: Family drama Romance
- Written by: Zama Habib
- Directed by: Santram Varma; Kaushik Ghatak; Vikram Labhe; Ajit Kumar; Rahul Aggarwal; Noel Smith
- Creative directors: Pinky Shah; Ameeta Devadiga; Pritish Das
- Starring: Krystle D'Souza; Nia Sharma; Karan Tacker; Kushal Tandon
- Opening theme: Ek Hazaaron Mein Meri Behna Hai by Shreya Ghoshal
- Country of origin: India
- Original language: Hindi
- No. of seasons: 1
- No. of episodes: 515

Production
- Producers: Prem Kishan; Sunil Mehta
- Production locations: Rishikesh; Mussoorie; Chandigarh; Mumbai
- Cinematography: Mahesh Talkad; Sanjay Malwankar; Danny
- Editor: Nirmala John
- Running time: Approx. 21 minutes
- Production company: Cinevistaas Limited

Original release
- Network: StarPlus
- Release: 3 October 2011 – 13 September 2013

Ek Hazaaron Mein Meri Behna Hai (lit. My Sister is One in a Thousand), also internationally known as The Inseparables, is an Indian Hindi-language family drama television series that aired on StarPlus during weekdays from 3 October 2011 to 13 September 2013. It is digitally available on Disney+ Hotstar.

== Plot ==
Two sisters, Jeevika and Manvi live in Rishikesh with their family. Jeevika is sweet, righteous and mature, and is a teacher in a neighbouring school. Her younger sister, Manvi, fresh out of college, is carefree, rebellious, childish and immature. Chandrika, their grandmother receives a marriage proposal for Jeevika from the Vadheras in Chandigarh. Jeevika has some feelings for Dr. Manan, but sides with Chandrika despite her feelings.

The Vadheras' sons, Viren and Virat, meet Jeevika and Manvi. Viren meets Jeevika and falls for her and they marry. After a series of incidents, Virat and Manvi bond with each other.

Soon after, Manvi is diagnosed with cancer. But she decides not to disclose it to Jeevika or her new family. Around the same time, Jeevika faces an accident during her stay at Rishikesh. Viren asks Manvi to donate her blood, but she refuses leaving Viren furious. A confused Virat takes her away from the hospital and confronts her, and ends their friendship. She is thus forced to reveal to Virat about her condition.

On the other hand, Viren, unaware of Manvi's illness, forbids her to meet Jeevika and leaves for Chandigarh with his unconscious wife on chartered flight. Virat supports Manvi and decides to take her to Chandigarh. Troubled, Manvi reaches Chandigarh, and the family, later, Jeevika learns of her condition. Jeevika takes Manvi to Mumbai to further pursue treatment. Manvi successfully recovers and in the process, Virat and Manvi grow closer and are engaged. Meanwhile, Jeevika becomes pregnant.

On the day of the engagement, Manvi learns that her Mumbai treatment was unsuccessful and she has two years to live. For her treatment to be successful, she needs a bone marrow donor. Jeevika's bone marrow matches with Manvi, but she is unable to donate because she is pregnant. Jeevika and Viren decide it would be right to abort their child to save Manvi's life. After all, Manvi is like Jeevika's first child. Manvi resents Jeevika's decision as she does not want her to abort her child. She goes to court to stop Jeevika with Inder fighting from her side and Viren fighting Jeevika's. Later, Jeevika lies to the family that they found another donor whose bone marrow matched with Manvi's to get the treatment done. Jeevika aborts her child and secretly donates her bone marrow to Manvi with the support of Viren.

The family later faces more obstacles; due to Viren's professional rival Jaiswal sending Swamini's son, Karan to their house. Virat and Jeevika are falsely imprisoned, but Manvi and Viren manage to prove them innocent. The sisters manage to save the Chaudharys' ancestral property from being taken away by Dabbu's greedy wife, Sweety by reforming her. Virat later moves out to prove himself as a successful singer and Manvi follows him. The sisters' estranged father, Mahesh also makes an appearance, and Manvi immediately forgives her father for his absence and helps him reconcile with the family.

Jeevika learns that she is infertile; due to having donated her bone marrow to Manvi while she was pregnant the first time and they opt for surrogacy with the help of a woman named Vidhi. Meanwhile, Manvi is also pregnant and reunite with the family. Viren helps Vidhi escape from her abusive husband, Harshad. Vidhi conceives and later gives birth to Viren and Jeevika's child.

Jeevika names her daughter Mansi while Manvi names her daughter Jhanvi. Furthermore, it is revealed that Jeevika is pregnant. The show ends on a happy note with the entire family together.

== Cast ==
=== Main ===
- Krystle D'Souza as Jeevika Singh Vadhera: Mahesh and Payal's elder daughter; Manvi's elder sister; Viren's wife; Mansi's mother (2011–2013)
  - Simran Natekar as Child Jeevika Singh Chaudhary (2011)
- Nia Sharma as Manvi Singh Vadhera: Mahesh and Payal's younger daughter; Jeevika's younger sister; Virat's wife; Jhanvi's mother (2011–2013)
  - Reem Shaikh as Child Manvi Singh Chaudhary (2011)
- Karan Tacker as Viren Singh Vadhera: Vikram and Vanshika's elder son; Virat's elder brother; Jeevika's husband; Mansi's father (2011–2013)
- Kushal Tandon as Virat Singh Vadhera: Vikram and Vanshika's younger son; Viren's younger brother; Manvi's husband; Jhanvi's father (2011–2013)

=== Recurring ===
- Deep Dhillon as Vijay Singh Vadhera: Daljeet's husband; Vikram, Inder and Swamini's father; Viren, Virat, Shlok and Karan's grandfather; Mansi and Jhanvi's great-grandfather (2011–2013)
- Amardeep Jha as Daljeet Singh Vadhera: Vijay's wife; Vikram, Inder and Swamini's mother; Viren, Virat, Shlok and Karan's grandmother; Mansi and Jhanvi's great-grandmother (2011–2013)
- Hiten Tejwani as Vikram Singh Vadhera: Vijay and Daljeet's son; Inder and Swamini's brother; Vanshika's husband; Viren and Virat's father; Mansi and Jhanvi's grandfather (2011) (cameo)
- Indu Verma as Vanshika Singh Vadhera: Vikram's wife; Viren and Virat's mother; Mansi and Jhanvi's grandmother (2011–2013)
- Anupam Bhattarcharya as Inder Singh Vadhera: Vijay and Daljeet's son; Vijay and Swamini's brother; Kadambari's husband; Shlok's father (2011–2013)
- Manasvi Vyas as Kadambari Singh Vadhera: Inder's wife; Shlok's mother (2011–2013)
- Nikunj Pandey as Shlok Singh Vadhera: Inder and Kadambari's son (2011–2013)
- Seema Kapoor as Swamini Singh Shekhawat: Vijay and Daljeet's daughter; Vikram and Inder's sister; Karan's mother (2011–2013)
- Sehban Azim as Karan Singh Shekhawat: Swamini's son; Viren, Virat and Shlok's cousin (2011–2013)
- Tarla Joshi as Sunidhi Singh Chaudhary: Mahesh and Madan's grandmother; Jeevika, Manvi and Devender's great-grandmother (2011–2013)
- Anju Mahendru as Chandrika Singh Chaudhary: Mahesh and Madan's mother; Jeevika, Manvi and Devender's grandmother (2011–2013)
- Imran Khan as Mahesh Singh Chaudhary: Chandrika's son; Madan's brother; Payal's husband; Jeevika and Manvi's father; Mansi and Jhanvi's grandfather (2013)
- Tassnim Sheikh as Payal Singh Chaudhary: Mahesh's wife; Jeevika and Manvi's mother; Mansi and Jhanvi's grandmother (2011)
- Mohit Chauhan as Madan Singh Chaudhary: Chandrika's son; Mahesh's brother; Pinky's husband; Devender's father (2011–2013)
- Divyajyotee Sharma as Pinky Singh Chaudhary: Madan's wife; Devender's mother (2011–2013)
- Gaurav Kumar/Akshay Dogra/Vishal Karwal as Devender "Dabbu" Singh Chaudhary: Madan and Pinky's son; Sweety's husband (2011–2013)
- Lavina Tandon as Sweety Singh Chaudhary: Devender's wife (2013)
- Abhinav Shukla as Dr. Manan Bisht – Jeevika's crush (2011–2012)
- Mihir Mishra as Dr. Rahul Mehra (2012)
- Nikunj Malik as Maya Bharadwaj: Virat's ex-fiancé (2012)
- Aman Verma/Abir Goswami as Rajiv Talwar: Vanshika's friend (2012)
- Manasi Parekh as Mahi Chaudhary: Jeevika and Manvi's cousin (2012)
- Apurva Agnihotri as Judge of the singing competition (2012)
- Shilpa Saklani as Judge of singing competition (2012)
- Anele Bele as a presenter at singing competition (2012)
- Suzanne Bernert as Liz: Vijay's love interest (2013)
- Bhupinder Bhoopii as Inspector Joginder Singh
- Utpal Dashora
- Puneet Sachdev as Vikram Rekhi (2013)
- Karan Suchak as Sambhav Malik (2013)
- Kajal Pisal as Riya Malik: Sambhav's wife (2013)
- Neeraj Malviya as Shashank Mehta/Harshad: Vidhi's ex-husband (2013)
- Neha Gosain as Vidhi Mehta: Mansi's surrogate mother (2013)

=== Guests ===
- Ragini Khanna and Jay Soni as Suhana Kashyap and Ishaan Kashyap from Sasural Genda Phool
- Sanaya Irani as Khushi Singh Raizada from Iss Pyaar Ko Kya Naam Doon?
- Barun Sobti as Arnav Singh Raizada from "Iss Pyaar Ko Kya Naam Doon?"
- Deepika Singh as Sandhya Rathi from Diya Aur Baati Hum
- Anas Rashid as Sooraj Rathi from "Diya Aur Baati Hum"
- Hina Khan as Akshara Singhania from Yeh Rishta Kya Kehlata Hai (2012)
- Karan Mehra as Naitik Singhania from "Yeh Rishta Kya Kehlata Hai" (2012)
- Kunwar Amar (2011) from Dil Dostii Dance special performance on Bole Chudiyan
- Shakti Mohan (2011) from Dil Dostii Dance special performance on Bole Chudiyan
- Shantanu Maheshwari (2011) from Dil Dostii Dance special performance on Bole Chudiyan
- Sneha Kapoor (2011) from Dil Dostii Dance special performance on Bole Chudiyan
- Archi Pratik (2011) from Dil Dostii Dance special performance on Bole Chudiyan
- Alisha Singh (2011) from Dil Dostii Dance special performance on Bole Chudiyan
- Amar Gowda (2011) from Dil Dostii Dance special performance on Bole Chudiyan
- Vinti Idnani (2011) from Dil Dostii Dance special performance on Bole Chudiyan
- Macedon D'mello (2011) from Dil Dostii Dance special performance on Bole Chudiyan
- Samentha Fernandes (2011) from Dil Dostii Dance special performance on Bole Chudiyan
- Mohammad Nazim (2012) as Ahem Modi from Saath Nibhaana Saathiya
- Devoleena Bhattacharjee (2012) as Gopi Modi from Saath Nibhaana Saathiya
- Disha Parmar (2012) as Pankhuri Kumar from Pyaar Ka Dard Hai Meetha Meetha Pyaara Pyaara
- Gautam Rode as Saraswatichandra Vyas from "Saraswatichandra" (2014)
- Jennifer Winget as Kumud Desai Vyas from "Saraswatichandra" (2014)
- Varun Kapoor as Danny Vyas from "Saraswatichandra
- Shiny Doshi as Kusum Desai Vyas from "Saraswatichandra" (2014)
- Ashish Kapoor as Kabir Vyas from "Saraswatichandra" (2014)
- Srishty Rode as Anushka Vyas from "Saraswatichandra" (2014)
- Karan Patel as Raman Bhalla from "Yeh Hai Mohabbatein" (2014)
- Divyanka Tripathi as Ishita Bhalla from "Yeh Hai Mohabbatein" (2014)
- Avinash Sachdev as Shlok Agnihotri from "Iss Pyaar Ko Kya Naam Doon? Ek Baar Phir" (2014)
- Shrenu Parikh as Astha Shlok Agnihotri from "Iss Pyaar Ko Kya Naam Doon? Ek Baar Phir" (2014)
- Abhishek Bachchan to promote Bol Bachchan (2012)
- Ajay Devgn to promote Bol Bachchan (2012)
- Prachi Desai to promote Bol Bachchan (2012)
- Asin to promote Bol Bachchan (2012)

== Production ==
=== Development ===
Much of the show has been shot in Rishikesh, Chandigarh and Mumbai. In the earlier episodes of the show, the cast had gone to Mussoorie to shoot the show in Jaypee Residency Manor, Mussoorie but in the show it was claimed as their bungalow. The series was also dubbed into English as The Inseparables on Star Life.

=== Casting ===
The show is produced and directed by Siddharth Malhotra of Cinevistaas Limited. Krystle D'Souza was cast to play Jeevika Chaudhary along with Nia Sharma as Manvi Chaudhary. Karan Tacker and Kushal Tandon both were finalised to play the main role. Abhinav Shukla was roped to play another important chartecter in the series. Other cast included Seema Kapoor, Anju Mahendru, Manasvi Vyas, Anupam Bhattacharya, Divyajyotee Sharma, Gaurav Kumar, Deep Dhillon and Tarla Joshi. Seema played a strict women and but later her character turned positive.

=== Cancellation and future ===
Speaking about its end, producer Siddharth Malhotra said, "The channel did not want to shut the show. Both the channel and the production house tried reasoning with the cast. But since they are unwilling to play parents on screen, we have to forcibly end the show." In Jan 2021, the show confirmed returning with a sequel.

== Reception ==
The Indian Express rated the show two stars and said, "The show is strictly average fare. Krystal D'Souza and Nia Sharma as Jeevika and Maanvi share a sweet chemistry. The promos of the show and the title had got us excited but the bonding between the two sisters doesn't go beyond hugging each other and wiping each other's tears. We wish the scenes were written better…with a title like that we expected some more endearing, engaging stuff between the sisters."

== Awards and nominations ==
Year	Award Ceremony	Category	Recipient	Result
2012	Indian Telly Awards	Fresh New Face (Male)	Kushal Tandon	Won
2012	Gold Awards	Best Debut (Male)	Kushal Tandon	Won
2012	Gold Awards	Best Show	Prem Krishen & Sunil Mehta	Nominated
2012	People's Choice Awards India	Favourite New Television Drama	Prem Krishen & Sunil Mehta	Nominated
2012	Indian Television Academy Awards	Best Actress Drama	Nia Sharma	Won
2012	Indian Television Academy Awards	Best Actor Drama	Kushal Tandon	Nominated
2012	Indian Television Academy Awards	Best Serial Drama	Prem Krishen & Sunil Mehta	Nominated
2012	Indian Television Academy Awards	Best Actress Drama (Jury)	Krystle D'Souza	Nominated
2012	Indian Television Academy Awards	Best Serial Drama (Jury)	Prem Krishen & Sunil Mehta	Nominated
2012	Indian Television Academy Awards	GR8! Performer Of The Year	Karan Tacker	Nominated
2012	Indian Television Academy Awards	Best Director Drama (Jury)	Santaram Verma	Nominated
2012	Indian Television Academy Awards	Best Teleplay (Jury)	Bhavini Iyer & Zama Habib	Won
2013	Indian Telly Awards	Best Ensemble	Cinevistaas Limited	Won
2013	Indian Telly Awards	Best Actress In Leading Role	Nia Sharma	Nominated
2013	Indian Telly Awards	Best Drama Series	Cinevistaas Limited	Nominated
