= Raisinghani vs Raisinghani =

Hindi legal drama OTT series on Sony LIV

- Created by: Aniruddha Rajderkar Bhavna Shrestha
- Written by: Anuraadha Tewari
- Directed by: Aniruddha Rajderkar
- Starring: Jennifer Winget; Karan Wahi; Reem Sameer Shaikh; Eklavya Sood; Sanjay Nath
- Music by: Gaurav Dagaonkar
- Composers: Bebaaqiyan; Awargi
- Country of origin: India
- Original language: Hindi
- No. of seasons: 1
- No. of episodes: 102

Production
- Producers: Smruti Shinde; Harvindar Arora
- Cinematography: Indranil Singha
- Running time: 30 minutes
- Production company: Sobo Films Holding

Original release
- Network: SonyLIV; Sony Entertainment Television
- Release: 12 February – 9 August 2024

Raisinghani vs Raisinghani is a legal drama series streaming on Sony LIV, directed by Aniruddha Rajderkar. Produced by Sobo Films Holding P.Ltd, it stars Jennifer Winget, Karan Wahi, and Reem Shaikh. It first streamed on Sony LIV OTT platform and then was telecast on Sony Entertainment Television.

== Synopsis ==
Anushka is a clear-sighted, honest and intelligent young lawyer, striving to make her mark in her father’s prestigious law firm. Virat, an ambitious and driven young lawyer, is viewed as the natural successor of the firm. As her ethics and righteousness clash with his views and objectives, moral differences play out.

Anushka and Virat, who were once in love, are now in conflict, bound by destiny and brought together by their differences. The stakes are high in this professional rivalry with differing ideologies.

The law firm’s young intern, Ankita Pandey, navigates her own dark secrets as she attempts to lay claim to what she believes is rightfully hers.

== Cast ==
- Jennifer Winget as Anushka Raisinghani: Rajdeep's elder daughter; Gayatri's granddaughter; Virat's love interest.
  - Kiara Sadh as young Anushka
- Karan Wahi as Virat Choudhary: R-Legal's de facto head; Anushaka's love interest; Rajdeep's Prodigy and senior Lawyer & Partner at R-Legal.
- Reem Shaikh as Ankita Raisinghani : Rajdeep's and Madhu's illegitimate daughter; Rahul's adopted daughter (died)

=== Recurring ===
- Sanjay Nath as Rajdeep Raisinghani: Anushka's father; Ankita's illegitimate father; Gayatri's elder son; Dev's elder brother.
- Anita Kanwal as Gayatri Raisinghani: Rajdeep and Dev's mother; Anushka and Ankita's grandmother
- Joy Sengupta as Dev Raisinghani: Dolly's husband; Siddharth's father; Gayatri's younger son; Rajdeep's young brother; Anushka's paternal uncle.
- Ashita Dhawan as Dolly Raisinghani: Dev's wife; Siddharth's mother; Gayatri's Daughter-in-law; Anushka's paternal aunt.
- Sid Makkar as Akshat Mehra: Anushka's ex love interest
- Abhishek Saklani as Siddharth Raisinghani: Dev and Dolly's son; Gayatri's grandson
- Preeti Amin as Radha Mehta Raisinghani: Rajdeep's wife; Anushka's mother
- Simone Singh as Dr. Ramaya Grewal: Rajdeep's love Interest
- Deepak Parashar as Girdharilal Mehta: Anushka's maternal grandfather; Rajdeep's father-in-law; Radha's father
- Shaline pandey (Shelly) as Shahnaz, she's the student of Anushka
- Unknown as Shravan Mehta: son of Girdhari's son; Anushka's uncle
- Eklavya Sood as Harsh Nokewal: Rajdeep's son old friend and Junior Lawyer at R-legal (died)
- Ishaan Singh Manhas as Aryaman Singh Kandola: Virat's childhood friend
- Priyanka Dutt as Monica
- Nimesh Diliprai as Aryaman's father
- Nanncy Gil as Jia Chatterjee
- Jay Zaveri as Dheeraj: senior partner at R legal
- Yogesh Semwal as Milind
- Sharmistha Raut as Jyoti: senior partner at R legal
- Kaizad Kotwal as Kersey: sleeping partner at R legal and friend of Rajdeep Raisinghani
- Sahaj Singh as Raghav Khurana
- Kuldeep Singh as ACP Yogesh Patkar
- Vishal Nayak as Rahul Pandey (died)
- Bhawna Aneja as Madhu Rastogi Pandey: Ankita's mother; Rahul's wife
- Rishi Gambir as Prashant Radhakrishnan: Akshat's best friend and crime tv show host
- Deepshikha Nagpal as Nina Walia: sharavan mehta's Friend
- Sarmishta Acharjee as Rumina Khan: an intern at R Legal
- Ankita Rai as Kalpu: student of Anushka Night Classes
- Bharat Arora
- Mayanka Sharma Patel
