= Code M =

Indian web series

- Genre: Drama; Mystery
- Created by: Juggernaut Productions (Season 1&2); JioStudios (Season 2)
- Written by: Shubhra Chatterji; Ankit Khurana; Aniruddha Guha; Aparna Nadig
- Directed by: Hrishikesh Bhargava; Arnav Chakravarti
- Starring: Jennifer Winget
- Country of origin: India
- Original language: Hindi
- No. of seasons: 2
- No. of episodes: 16

Production
- Executive producers: Aakaash Berry; Akanksha Shukla
- Producer: Samar Khan
- Production location: India
- Cinematography: Shanu Singh Rajput
- Camera setup: Multi-camera
- Running time: 18–25 minutes
- Production companies: Juggernaut Productions (Seasons 1 & 2); JioStudios (Season 2)

Original release
- Network: ALT Balaji (season 1 & 2); ZEE5 (season 1); Voot (season 2)
- Release: January 15, 2020 – June 8, 2022

Code M is an Indian Hindi-language crime drama web series created and produced by Juggernaut Productions for ALT Balaji and ZEE5. The series stars Jennifer Winget, Rajat Kapoor, Seema Biswas and Tanuj Virwani.

== Plot ==
The series revolves around an Indian Army lawyer, Monica Mehra, who discovers a conspiracy plot during her investigation of a military encounter case.

The series starts with a flashback scene, where three military men (Maj. Shakti Mandappa, Maj. Gaurav Shekhawat and Maj. Ajay Paswan) are following two terrorists. After ambushing them, a gunfire battle ensues, where the two terrorists and Maj. Paswan are killed.

At the nearby Indian Army base in Jodhpur, Rajasthan, after facing protests from locals disputing the military's characterization of a terrorist encounter as fake, the mother of the slain Indian asks for justice. After she immolates herself and suffers burns, the military establishment hires an Army lawyer (Monica Mehra) to probe the incident independently.

Monica is shown to be a fierce and fearless individual, who is just weeks away from her wedding, accepts the order for investigation upon the urge of the military head of the base, Col. Suryaveer Chauhan, who incidentally happens to be a family friend. Initially, Monica finds the incident an open-and-shut case.

However, after additional questioning of Shakti and Gaurav, she suspects them of wrong-doing. In reaction, the two hire Angad Sandhu as their counsel, who coincidentally happens to be Monica's ex-boyfriend. After a series of confrontations and mishaps, Monica and Angad team up together to learn the truth. After days of twists and turns, Monica confronts Gaurav, who under emotional distress, reveals the truth partly. Gaurav says that he and Shakti are gay and they love each other. Even after Shakti's marriage and kid, they continued to maintain their same-sex relationship by making sure they were stationed at the same base. Gaurav says that after Maj. Paswan learned of their truth, afraid that he may expose them one day, Shakti and Gaurav plot to kill him with a fake terrorist encounter as a ruse.

As the series ends, Shakti is taken into military police custody while Gaurav commits suicide. As Monica leaves for home, she remembers another detail that bothers her and returns to the base. She confronts Shakti to unveil the remaining truth and Shakti tells her that Col. Chauhan wanted purity in the military and asks her to confront him.

After setting up a routine conversation with Col. Chauhan, in a fit of rage, he admits that he directed Shakti and Gaurav to kill Ajay as he disapproved of his engagement with his daughter as Ajay belonged to a different caste that he felt were inferior to his. He blackmailed Shakti to commit this crime to protect his gay identity.

Monica finally exposes Col. Chauhan and admonishes him for wearing a military uniform that is meant to serve all irrespective of gender or societal status while committing such crimes. She brings forth his daughter, Gayatri, who slaps him and abandons him.

The series ends with a tribute to the brave men and women of the Indian armed forces.

== Cast ==
=== Season 1 ===
- Jennifer Winget as Major Monica Mehra
- Tanuj Virwani as Legal Council Angad Sandhu
- Rajat Kapoor Col. Suryaveer Chauhan
- Seema Biswas as, alleged terrorist, Asif's mother
- Anisa Butt as Gayatri Chauhan
- Madhurima Roy as Zeenat
- Keshav Sadhna as Major Gaurav Shekhawat
- Aalekh Kapoor as Major Shakti Mandappa
- Meghana Kaushik as Serana, Shakti's Wife

=== Season 2 ===
- Jennifer Winget as Major Monica Mehra
- Tanuj Virwani as Legal Council Angad Sandhu
- Swanand Kirkire

== Episodes ==
=== Series overview ===
Series	Episodes	Originally released
1	8	15 January 2020
2	8	9 June 2022

=== Season 1 ===
No. overall	No. in season	Title	Directed by	Written by	Original release date
1	1	"Iss Case Ko Dil Se Nahi Dimaag Se Solve Karna"	Akshay Choubey	Shubhra Chatterji, Aparna Nadig, Aniruddha Guha	15 January 2020
2	2	"Fauj Ki Dahad"	Akshay Choubey	Shubhra Chatterji, Aparna Nadig, Aniruddha Guha	15 January 2020
3	3	"Vardi Maili Ho Ya Saaf, Indian Army Ki Hi Hoti Hai!"	Akshay Choubey	Shubhra Chatterji, Aparna Nadig, Aniruddha Guha	15 January 2020
4	4	"Saat Saal Pehle Bhi Ek Encounter?"	Akshay Choubey	Shubhra Chatterji, Aparna Nadig, Aniruddha Guha	15 January 2020
5	5	"Har Kahaani Ke Teen Pehlu Hote Hai – Unka, Tumhara, Aur Sach"	Akshay Choubey	Shubhra Chatterji, Aparna Nadig, Aniruddha Guha, Sulagna Chatterjee	15 January 2020
6	6	"Aakhir Encounter Ke Din Hua Kya Tha?"	Akshay Choubey	Shubhra Chatterji, Aparna Nadig, Aniruddha Guha	15 January 2020
7	7	"Murder Hai, Motive Hai, Bas Confession Chahiye!"	Akshay Choubey	Shubhra Chatterji, Aparna Nadig, Aniruddha Guha	15 January 2020
8	8	"Jung Mein Kabhi Akele Mat Jaana!"	Akshay Choubey	Shubhra Chatterji, Aparna Nadig, Aniruddha Guha, Sulagna Chatterjee	15 January 2020

=== Season 2 ===
No. overall	No. in season	Title	Directed by	Written by	Original release date
1	1	"Back With A Bang"	Akshay Choubey	Shubhra Chatterji, Aparna Nadig, Aniruddha Guha	9 June 2022
2	2	"The Handover"	Akshay Choubey	Shubhra Chatterji, Aparna Nadig, Aniruddha Guha	9 June 2022
3	3	"The Target"	Akshay Choubey	Shubhra Chatterji, Aparna Nadig, Aniruddha Guha	9 June 2022
4	4	"The Commander"	Akshay Choubey	Shubhra Chatterji, Aparna Nadig, Aniruddha Guha	9 June 2022
5	5	"Behind The Scenes"	Akshay Choubey	Shubhra Chatterji, Aparna Nadig, Aniruddha Guha	9 June 2022
6	6	"The Past"	Akshay Choubey	Shubhra Chatterji, Aparna Nadig, Aniruddha Guha	9 June 2022
7	7	"The Test"	Akshay Choubey	Shubhra Chatterji, Aparna Nadig, Aniruddha Guha	9 June 2022
8	8	"The Vigilante"	Akshay Choubey	Shubhra Chatterji, Aparna Nadig, Aniruddha Guha	9 June 2022

== Critical reception ==
Writing in India Today Shweta Keshri has described the series as "Jennifer Winget and Tanuj Virwani-starrer Code M successfully connects with the audience. Also, with so many shows on men in uniform, it was a pleasant change to see a woman lead the way." Ruchi Kaushal for Hindustan Times wrote "Jennifer Winget makes an impressive debut on the digital platform as an army lawyer who delves into a high-profile case just days before her wedding." Priyakshi Sharma for Pinkvilla wrote "The 20-something minute episode does not waste a second. It is fast-paced and engaging from the word go."
