= Gaurav Kumar (kabaddi) =

Indian kabaddi player

Personal information
- Full name: Gaurav Kumar Chaudhary
- Nationality: Indian
- Born: 10 December 1997 (age 27); Bharapur Bhori, Haridwar, UP (now in Uttarakhand)

Sport
- Country: India
- Sport: Kabaddi
- Position: Defender, Left Corner
- League: Pro Kabaddi League

Gaurav Kumar (born 10 December 1997) is an Indian kabaddi player who currently plays for the UP Yoddha in VIVO Pro Kabaddi League and the India national kabaddi team.

== Early life ==
Gaurav Kumar was born in Bharapur Bhori village of Uttarakhand Haridwar district, where he started playing kabaddi.
