= ITA Award for Best Actress Drama Popular =

Indian Television Academy award

ITA Award for Best Actress Popular
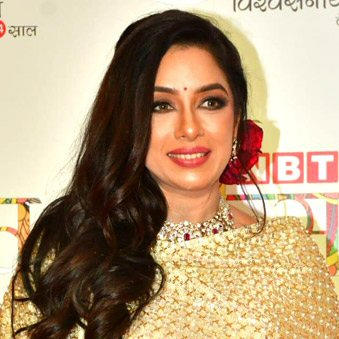
- The 2025 recipient: Rupali Ganguly
- Type: Best Actress Popular
- Awarded for: Most Popular Actress in Drama Category
- Country: India
- Presented by: Indian Television Academy Awards
- Formerly called: Desh Ki Dhadkan
- First award: 2001
- Final award: 2025

Highlights
- Most wins: Smriti Irani (5)
- Most nominations: Sakshi Tanwar (8)
- First winner: Smriti Irani for Kyunki Saas Bhi Kabhi Bahu Thi (2001)
- Latest winner: Rupali Ganguly for Anupamaa (2025)
- Website: Website

ITA Award for Best Actress Drama Popular is an award given by the Indian Television Academy as a part of its annual event to the female actor who receives the highest votes. First awarded in 2001, the award was originally named Desh Ki Dhadkan but was later renamed to Best Actress Popular.

== Superlatives ==
As of 2019, Smriti Irani has won the award 5 times out of the 6 nominations she received from 2001 to 2006. Hina Khan, Surbhi Chandna, Pranali Rathod and Rupali Ganguly have won 2 awards out of the 3 nominations they received. Sakshi Tanwar and Shweta Tiwari have 8 and 7 nominations, but have not won a single award. In 2004, Smriti Irani and Mona Singh, while in 2008 Parul Chauhan and Sara Khan shared the award.

== Winners and nominees ==
=== 2000s ===
Year	Photo	Actor	Role	Show
2001		Smriti Irani	Tulsi Virani	Kyunki Saas Bhi Kabhi Bahu Thi
2001		Sakshi Tanwar	Parvati Aggrawal	Kahaani Ghar Ghar Kii
2001		Neena Gupta	Priya Kapoor	Saans
2001		Pallavi Joshi	Leela Sharma	Justujoo
2001		Sandhya Mridul	Kaajal	Koshish - Ek Aasha
2002		Smriti Irani	Tulsi Virani	Kyunki Saas Bhi Kabhi Bahu Thi
2002		Sakshi Tanwar	Parvati Aggrawal	Kahaani Ghar Ghar Kii
2002		Shweta Tiwari	Prerna Sharma	Kasautii Zindagii Kay
2002		Gurdeep Kohli	Dr. Juhi Singh	Sanjivani - a medical boon
2002		Nausheen Ali Sardar	Kkusum	Kkusum
2003		Smriti Irani	Tulsi Virani	Kyunki Saas Bhi Kabhi Bahu Thi
2003		Sakshi Tanwar	Parvati Aggrawal	Kahaani Ghar Ghar Kii
2003		Farida Jalal	Sushma Mehra	Shararat
2003		Shweta Tiwari	Prerna Sharma	Kasautii Zindagii Kay
2003		Aamna Shariff	Kashish	Kahiin To Hoga
2004		Smriti Irani	Tulsi Virani	Kyunki Saas Bhi Kabhi Bahu Thi
2004		Mona Singh	Jasmeet Walia	Jassi Jaissi Koi Nahin
2004		Sakshi Tanwar	Parvati Aggrawal	Kahaani Ghar Ghar Kii
2004		Geeta Nair	Geeta	Haqeeqat
2004		Shweta Tiwari	Prerna Sharma	Kasautii Zindagii Kay
2004		Niki Aneja Walia	Dr. Simran Mathur	Astitva...Ek Prem Kahani
2005		Smriti Irani	Tulsi Virani	Kyunki Saas Bhi Kabhi Bahu Thi
2005		Sakshi Tanwar	Parvati Aggrawal	Kahaani Ghar Ghar Kii
2005		Niki Aneja Walia	Dr. Simran Mathur	Astitva...Ek Prem Kahani
2005		Shweta Tiwari	Prerna Sharma	Kasautii Zindagii Kay
2005		Mona Singh	Jassi	Jassi Jaissi Koi Nahin
2006		Rajshree Thakur	Saloni Singh	Saat Phere: Saloni Ka Safar
2006		Shweta Tiwari	Prerna Sharma	Kasautii Zindagii Kay
2006		Ratna Pathak	Maya Sarabhai	Sarabhai vs Sarabhai
2006		Supriya Pathak	Hansa Parekh	Instant Khichdi
2006		Divya Dutta	Shanno	Shanno Ki Shaadi
2007		Divyanka Tripathi	Vidya Singh	Banoo Main Teri Dulhann
2007		Shweta Tiwari	Prerna Sharma	Kasautii Zindagii Kay
2007		Prachi Desai	Bani Walia	Kasamh Se
2007		Sarita Joshi	Godavari Thakkar	Baa Bahu Aur Baby
2007		Smriti Irani	Vasudha	Virrudh
2007		Mugdha Chaphekar	Sanyogita	Dharti Ka Veer Yodha Prithviraj Chauhan
2008		Parul Chauhan	Ragini Rajvansh	Sapna Babul Ka...Bidaai
2008		Sara Khan	Sadhna Rajvansh	Sapna Babul Ka...Bidaai
2008		Divyanka Tripathi	Vidya Singh	Banoo Main Teri Dulhann
2008		Sarita Joshi	Godavari Thakkar	Baa Bahoo Aur Baby
2008		Additi Gupta	Heer Juneja	Kis Desh Mein Hai Meraa Dil
2008		Avika Gor	Anandi	Balika Vadhu
2009		Hina Khan	Akshara Singhania	Yeh Rishta Kya Kehlata Hai
2009		Ankita Lokhande	Archana Karanjkar	Pavitra Rishta
2009		Sara Khan	Sadhna Rajvanshi	Sapna Babul Ka...Bidaai
2009		Ratan Rajput	Laali	Agle Janam Mohe Bitiya Hi Kijo
2009		Aasiya Kazi	Santo Mahyavanshi	Bandini

=== 2010s ===
Year	Photo	Actress	Character	Show
2010		Rashami Desai	Tapasya Thakur	Uttaran
2010		Ankita Lokhande	Archana Karanjkar	Pavitra Rishta
2010		Hina Khan	Akshara Singhania	Yeh Rishta Kya Kehlata Hai
2010		Pooja Gor	Pratigya	Mann Kee Awaaz Pratigya
2010		Ragini Khanna	Suhana Kashyap	Sasural Genda Phool
2011		Giaa Manek	Gopi Modi	Saath Nibhaana Saathiya
2011		Ankita Lokhande	Archana Karanjkar	Pavitra Rishta
2011		Sakshi Tanwar	Priya Kapoor	Bade Achhe Lagte Hain
2011		Pratyusha Banerjee	Anandi	Balika Vadhu
2011		Pooja Gor	Pratigya	Mann Kee Awaaz Pratigya
2012		Nia Sharma	Maanvi Chaudhary	Ek Hazaaron Mein Meri Behna Hai
2012		Shweta Tiwari	Sweety Kaur Ahluwalia	Parvarrish – Kuchh Khattee Kuchh Meethi
2012		Sakshi Tanwar	Priya Kapoor	Bade Achhe Lagte Hain
2012		Rati Pandey	Indira	Hitler Didi
2012		Drashti Dhami	Madhubala	Madhubala – Ek Ishq Ek Junoon
2013		Devoleena Bhattacharjee	Gopi Modi	Saath Nibhaana Saathiya
2013		Paridhi Sharma	Jodhabai	Jodha Akbar
2013		Deepika Singh	Sandhya Rathi	Diya Aur Baati Hum
2013		Ankita Lokhande	Archana Deshmukh	Pavitra Rishta
2013		Sakshi Tanwar	Priya Kapoor	Bade Achhe Lagte Hain
2014		Deepika Singh	Sandhya Rathi	Diya Aur Baati Hum
2014		Sriti Jha	Pragya Arora	Kumkum Bhagya
2014		Divyanka Tripathi	Ishita Iyer	Ye Hai Mohabbatein
2014		Sanaya Irani	Parvati	Rangrasiya
2014		Preetika Rao	Aaliya	Beintehaa
2014		Drashti Dhami	Madhubala	Madhubala – Ek Ishq Ek Junoon
2014		Pooja Sharma	Draupadi	Mahabharat
2015		Hina Khan	Akshara Singhania	Yeh Rishta Kya Kehlata Hai
2015		Sriti Jha	Pragya Mehra	Kumkum Bhagya
2015		Divyanka Tripathi	Ishita Iyer	Ye Hai Mohabbatein
2015		Kratika Sengar	Tanu Bedi	Kasam Tere Pyaar Ki
2015		Pallavi Kulkarni	Ragini Khanna	Itna Karo Na Mujhe Pyaar
2016		Mouni Roy	Shivanya Singh	Naagin 1
2016		Sriti Jha	Pragya Mehra	Kumkum Bhagya
2016		Divyanka Tripathi	Ishita Iyer	Ye Hai Mohabbatein
2016		Kratika Sengar	Tanu Bedi	Kasam Tere Pyaar Ki
2016		Rubina Dilaik	Soumya	Shakti - Astitva Ke Ehsaas Ki
2017		Helly Shah	Devanshi Chaudhary	Devanshi
2017		Sriti Jha	Pragya Mehra	Kumkum Bhagya
2017		Mouni Roy	Shivangi Singh	Naagin 2
2017		Surbhi Chandna	Anika Trivedi	Ishqbaaaz
2017		Aditi Rathore	Avni Ayesha	Naamkarann
2018		Surbhi Chandna	Anika Trivedi	Ishqbaaz
2018		Jennifer Winget	Zoya Siddiqui	Bepannah
2018		Drashti Dhami	Nandini Thakur	Silsila Badalte Rishton Ka
2018		Rubina Dilaik	Soumya Singh	Shakti - Astitva Ke Ehsaas Ki
2018		Aditi Rathore	Avni Ayesha	Naamkarann
2019		Shivangi Joshi	Naira Goenka	Yeh Rishta Kya Kehlata Hai
2019		Shraddha Arya	Preeta Arora	Kundali Bhagya
2019		Ashi Singh	Naina Agarwal	Yeh Un Dinon Ki Baat Hai
2019		Erica Fernandes	Prerna Sharma	Kasautii Zindagii Kay

=== 2020s ===
Year	Photo	Actress	Character	Show
2020		Surbhi Chandna	Bani Sharma	Naagin 5
2020		Shraddha Arya	Preeta Arora	Kundali Bhagya
2020		Rupali Ganguly	Anupamaa	Anupamaa
2020		Helly Shah	Riddhima Raisinghania	Ishq Mein Marjawan 2
2021		Rupali Ganguly	Anupamaa Joshi	Anupamaa
2021		Shivangi Khedkar	Pallavi Rao	Mehndi Hai Rachne Waali
2021		Ashi Singh	Meet Hooda	Meet: Badlegi Duniya Ki Reet
2021		Helly Shah	Riddhima Raisinghania	Ishq Mein Marjawan 2
2021		Mallika Singh	Radha	RadhaKrishn
2022		Pranali Rathod	Akshara Birla	Yeh Rishta Kya Kehlata Hai
2022		Tejasswi Prakash	Pratha Gujral	Naagin 6
2022		Gulki Joshi	Haseena Malik	Maddam Sir
2022		Niyati Fatnani	Ginni Grewal	Channa Mereya
2022		Mallika Singh	Radha	RadhaKrishn
2023		Tejasswi Prakash	Pratha Gujral	Naagin 6
2023		Shivangi Joshi	Aradhana Sahni	Barsatein – Mausam Pyaar Ka
2023		Aditi Sharma	Katha Singh	Katha Ankahee
2023		Pranali Rathod	Akshara Birla	Yeh Rishta Kya Kehlata Hai
2023		Ashi Singh	Meet Hooda	Meet: Badlegi Duniya Ki Reet
2024		Pranali Rathod	Akshara Birla	Yeh Rishta Kya Kehlata Hai
2024		Rupali Ganguly	Anupamaa	Anupamaa
2024		Sumbul Touqeer	Kavya Bansal	Kavya – Ek Jazbaa, Ek Junoon
2024		Aditi Rathore	Tanvi Sharma	Aangan – Aapno Kaa
2024		Samridhii Shukla	Abhira Sharma	Yeh Rishta Kya Kehlata Hai
2024		Ashi Singh	Meet Hooda	Meet: Badlegi Duniya Ki Reet
2025		Rupali Ganguly	Anupamaa Joshi	Anupamaa
2025		Shivangi Joshi	Bhagyashree Iyer	Bade Achhe Lagte Hain 4
2025		Ashi Singh	Kairi Sharma	Ufff..Yeh Love Hai Mushkil
2025		Pranali Rathod	Prarthana Malhotra	Kumkum Bhagya
2025		Smriti Irani	Tulsi Virani	Kyunki Saas Bhi Kabhi Bahu Thi 2
2026		Shivangi Joshi	Bhagyashree Iyer	Bade Achhe Lagte Hain 4
2026		Priyanka Choudhary	Purvi	Naagin 7
2026		Pranali Rathod	Prarthana Malhotra	Kumkum Bhagya
2026		Samridhii Shukla	Abhira Sharma	Yeh Rishta Kya Kehlata Hai
2026		Yashika Sharma	Rimjhim	Rimjhim: Choti Umar Bada Safar

== See also ==
- ITA Award for Best Actor Drama Popular
- ITA Award for Best Actress Drama Jury
- ITA Award for Best Actor Drama Jury
