= Prem Krishen =

Indian actor and producer

- Born: Prem Krishen Malhotra; 5 July 1953 (age 73); Bombay, Bombay State, India
- Occupations: Television director; television producer; actor
- Years active: 1977-present
- Known for: Bepannaah; Dill Mill Gayye
- Parents: Prem Nath (father); Bina Rai (mother)
- Relatives: Rajendra Nath (Paternal uncle); Narendra Nath (Paternal uncle); Siddharth P. Malhotra (son)

Prem Krishen (born 5 July 1953) is an Indian actor, turned TV and film producer and the owner of Cinevistaas Limited, a film and television production company established in 1993, known for TV series such as Kathasagar, Gul Gulshan Gulfaam, Junoon, Dill Mill Gayye and Bepannaah.

== Early life and education ==
He is the son of former actor Prem Nath and former actress Bina Rai. He has a younger brother, Kailash.

== Career ==
He followed in his parents' footsteps and his first film was Jaan Haazir Hai starring Shekhar Kapur and Trilok Kapoor. He later starred in the big hit Dulhan Wohi Jo Piya Man Bhaye (1977) which revived the Rajshri banner, and in a few television serials. Soon he became a producer.

== Filmography ==
=== Actor ===
Year	Film	Role.
1977	Alibaba Marjinaa	Alibaba
1977	Dulhan Wohi Jo Piya Man Bhaye	Prem
1977	Jay Vejay	Prince Vejay/Pratap Singh
1979	Hamare Tumhare	Vikram Sinha
1980	Guest House	Prem
1981	Hotel	Sanjay
1982	Hum Paagal Premee	Prem
1982	Ashanti	Ashok

=== Producer ===
Film

Year	Film
2002	Yeh Mohabbat Hai
2003	Sssshhh...
2004	Garv: Pride and Honour

Television

Year	TV-Series	Channel
1987	Gul Gulshan Gulfaam	DD National
2008	Hamari Betiyoon Ka Vivaah	Zee TV
2010	Dill Mill Gayye	Star One
2014	Ek Hasina Thi (TV series)	Star Plus
2016	Beyhadh	Sony TV
2018	Ek Deewaana Tha	Sony TV
2018	Bepannaah	Colors TV
2018	Yeh Teri Galiyan	Zee TV
