= Bepannah =

Indian television series

- Genre: Romance; Drama; Mystery
- Created by: Aniruddha Rajderkar
- Written by: Prakriti Mukherjee
- Screenplay by: Ishita Moitra; Prakriti Mukherjee; Ishaan Bajpayee
- Story by: Prakriti Mukherjee; Srinita Bhoumick
- Directed by: Aniruddha Rajderkar; Vikram Labhe; Yogesh Pundir
- Creative director: Ameeta Devadigga
- Starring: Harshad Chopda; Jennifer Winget
- Theme music composer: Rahul Jain
- Opening theme: Bepannaah
- Composer: Rahul Jain
- Country of origin: India
- Original language: Hindi
- No. of seasons: 1
- No. of episodes: 186

Production
- Executive producer: Vijay Singh Phoolka
- Producers: Prem Krishen; Sunil Mehta
- Cinematography: Hanoz VK
- Editors: Shadab Khan; Aasif Khan; Sanjay Sapte
- Running time: 20 minutes
- Production company: Cinevistaas Limited

Original release
- Network: Colors TV
- Release: 19 March – 30 November 2018

Bepannah (Endless) is a Hindi romantic mystery drama television series that aired from 19 March to 30 November 2018 on Colors TV. Produced by Cinevistaas Limited, it streamed on Voot and starred Harshad Chopda and Jennifer Winget.

== Plot ==
Aditya Hooda and Zoya Siddiqui are two individuals brought together by fate through their spouses' betrayal.

Aditya and Zoya's partners Pooja Mathur and Yash Arora are found dead together in a road accident. They discover that the two were having an affair and are left shocked. Aditya channels his grief into anger while Zoya goes into denial. The divorce papers filed by Pooja and Yash reach them late. Unable to run from the truth anymore, Zoya attempts suicide but is saved by Aditya.

As the two bond over their shared trauma, CBI Inspector Rajveer Khanna enters their lives with a relentless hunger to put them behind bars. He believes them to be guilty for the murder of their spouses and frames for the same. Having grown to trust one another, Aditya and Zoya go on the run to prove their innocence.

Harshvardhan proves them innocent. Aditya and Zoya read Pooja's diary and break down, learning that Pooja was pregnant with Yash's child. Broken but resolute, Aditya and Zoya decide to move on. Together, they forgive Yash and Pooja. Aditya leaves for Paris, wanting time to reflect on himself, while Zoya focuses on reviving her bankrupt company.

=== Six months later ===
Zoya is a successful entrepreneur. Sakshi is being held hostage by Anjana. Zoya supports Noor and Arjun when she finds out about their feelings. When Aditya returns from Paris, he finds Zoya a more confident and assertive version of herself while he himself has grown quieter. Their friendship blooms as they begin spending time together. Aditya realizes that he has fallen in love with Zoya.

When Aditya decides to confess to Zoya, he gets to know about her suitor Arshad Habib. Aditya gets jealous on seeing Zoya spend time with him. Sakshi is aware about Anjana being Pooja and Yash's murderer. Afraid of getting exposed, Anjana pushes Sakshi off a cliff. Aditya confesses his love to Zoya, but she misunderstands him.

Amidst the confusion, Zoya agrees to marry Arshad. Aditya confronts her and asks her to listen to her heart. Zoya remains obstinate but realizes she is not happy. On her wedding day, she accepts her feelings for Aditya, and her father Waseem breaks ties with her. Aditya and Zoya get married.

Zoya starts getting threatening messages and calls from Kalpana Dadeech. She brings out the truth about Rajveer being Harshvardhan's son and reveals his past where her daughter Pallavi was pregnant with Rajveer but Harshvardhan, unaware of it, had married Anjana. Heartbroken, Pallavi had committed suicide. Rajveer and Kalpana kill Harshvardhan to avenge Pallavi's death and frame Aditya, who is found unconscious near Harshvardhan's body, holding the knife. Rajveer causes misunderstandings between Aditya and Zoya. The two, broken and helpless, go their separate ways.

=== One year later ===
Aditya has taken over Hooda and Associates. Anjana is mentally unstable and kept under supervision. Zoya having studied clinical psychology, gets an internship in the same hospital Anjana is admitted in. Aditya and Zoya miss each other. When they come face to face, they try to ignore their feelings but eventually reconcile.

Arjun confesses his love for Noor. Anjana owns up about killing Pooja, Yash and Sakshi. She asks Aditya and Zoya to forgive her and is arrested. Aditya breaks down in disbelief. Zoya comforts him and the two embrace. Arjun and Noor get married and Aditya, Zoya, Arjun, Noor, Roshnaq and Waseem pose for a photograph.

== Cast ==
=== Main ===
- Harshad Chopda as Captain Aditya "Adi" Hooda: Pilot and businessman; owner of Hooda and Associates; former owner of Zosh Events; Anjana and Harshvardhan's son; Arjun's brother; Rajveer's half-brother Zoya's husband
- Jennifer Winget as Zoya Aditya Hooda: Event manager, businesswoman & clinical psychologist; owner of Zosh Events and clinical psychologist; Roshnaq and Waseem's daughter; Noor's sister; Aditya's wife

=== Recurring ===
- Rajesh Khattar as Harshvardhan "Harsh" Hooda: Renowned criminal lawyer; Anjana's husband; Aditya, Arjun and Rajveer's father
- Parineeta Borthakur as Anjana Hooda: Harshvardhan's wife; Aditya and Arjun's mother
- Iqbal Azad as Waseem Siddiqui: Roshnaq's husband; Zoya and Noor's father
- Aaryaa Sharma as Roshnaq Siddiqui: Waseem's wife; Zoya and Noor's mother
- Shehzad Shaikh as Arjun Hooda: Lawyer and radio jockey; Anjana and Harshvardhan's son; Aditya's brother; Rajveer's half-brother; Noor's husband
- Aanchal Goswami as Noor Arjun Hooda: Roshnaq and Waseem's younger daughter; Zoya's sister; Arjun's wife
- Namita Dubey as Pooja Mathur: Poet and artist; Sakshi's daughter; Aditya's former wife; Yash's lover
- Sehban Azim as Yash Arora: Businessman and poet; former owner of Zosh events; Madhu's son; Mahi's brother; Zoya's former husband; Pooja's lover
- Vaishnavi Dhanraj as Mahi Arora: Madhu's daughter; Yash's sister; Aditya's one-sided lover
- Shweta Gautam as Madhu Arora: Yash and Mahi's mother
- Mallika Nayak as Sakshi Mathur: Pooja's mother
- Apurva Agnihotri as Rajveer Khanna: CBI officer; Pallavi and Harshvardhan's son; Aditya and Arjun's half-brother
- Shagufta Ali as Kalpana Dadeech: Pallavi's mother; Rajveer's grandmother
- Unknown as Pallavi Dadeech: Kalpana's daughter; Harshvardhan's former lover; Rajveer's mother
- Taher Shabbir as Arshad Habib: Doctor; Ameena and Sohail's son; Zoya's former suitor
- Anjali Thakkar as Ameena Habib: Sohail's wife; Arshad's mother
- Unknown as Sohail Habib: Ameena's husband; Arshad's father; Waseem's friend
- Ishani Sharma as Milli: Receptionist at Hooda and Associates; Aditya's assistant
- Hargun Grover as Kunal: Aditya's friend
- Farah Lakhani as Mona: Employee at Zosh
- Palak Jain as Akanksha: Employee at Zosh
- Arun Sharma as Mithilesh: Employee at Zosh
- Yash Bhatia as Shaun: Employee at Zosh
- Nitesh Prasher as Vinod: Employee at Zosh
- Chandar Khanna as Kanti Virani: Client at Zosh Events; patriarch of the Virani family; Kalpesh and Sumer's father
- Rushil Bangia as Kalpesh Virani: Client at Zosh Events; Kanti's son; Sumer's brother; Sagarika's husband; Rajveer's friend
- Manisha Marzara as Sagarika Virani: Client at Zosh Events; Kalpesh's wife
- Sidhant Kapoor as Sumer Virani: Client at Zosh Events; Kanti's son; Kalpesh's brother
- Urfi Javed as Bella Kapoor: Client at Zosh Events; Rohan's wife
- Aakash Mansukhani as Rohan: Client at Zosh Events; Bella's husband
- Amir Malik as Ashish: Yash's friend and former company partner
- Sanjeev Sharma as Court Judge

=== Guests ===
Episode(s)	Name	Integration
69	Meera Deosthale	Jashn–E–Eid
69	Vijayendra Kumeria	Jashn–E–Eid
142—146	Vatsal Sheth	Sitaron Se Saji Baarat
142—146	Ishita Dutta	Sitaron Se Saji Baarat
142	Hina Khan	Sitaron Se Saji Baarat
143	Karan Tacker	Sitaron Se Saji Baarat

== Production ==
=== Development ===
The show was earlier titled Adhura Alvida but was later renamed Bepannaah.

=== Casting ===
Harshad Chopda and Jennifer Winget were cast as Aditya Hooda and Zoya Siddiqui.

On being asked about how he selected his role, Chopda said, "I am returning to television after a hiatus and I was consciously waiting to pick the right story. Bepannaah's core concept was the major influence in this case; Jennifer and I hit off as soon as we met. I'm sure it will be exciting for the audience to see us together onscreen." Winget added, "The first time I heard the narration for the show, I had tears in my eyes; a show like Bepannaah comes your way rarely and I am ecstatic to be a part of it."

Apart from them; Rajesh Khattar, Parineeta Borthakur, Shehzad Shaikh, Aanchal Goswami, Iqbal Azad, Aaryaa Sharma, Namita Dubey, Sehban Azim and Vaishnavi Dhanraj were cast to portray Harshvardhan Hooda, Anjana Hooda, Arjun Hooda, Noor Siddiqui, Waseem Siddiqui, Roshnaq Siddiqui, Pooja Mathur, Yash Arora and Mahi Arora.

In May 2018, Apurva Agnihotri joined the cast as Rajveer Khanna. Taher Shabbir was chosen to play Dr. Arshad Habib.

=== Filming ===
Bepannaah was mainly shot in Cinevistaas Studios, Mumbai but the opening sequences were filmed in Mussoorie.

== Soundtrack ==
Bepannah Original Soundtrack

Soundtrack album by Rahul Jain
- Released: 26 March 2018
- Genres: Romance; Soundtrack
- Length: 18:33
- Language: Hindi
- Label: Pehchan Music
- Producer: Soham Naik

Bepannah's soundtrack is written and composed by Rahul Jain. It released on 26 March 2018. The title track, Bepannaah, is sung by Rahul Jain and Roshni Shah. Zaroorat, sung by Rahul Jain and Ankita Dwivedi, was released on 18 August 2018.

Track listing
No.	Title	Lyrics	Music	Singer(s)	Length
1.	"Bepannah" (Male)	Rahul Jain & Amit Lakhani	Rahul Jain	Rahul Jain	5:12
2.	"Bepannah" (Duet)	Rahul Jain & Amit Lakhani	Rahul Jain	Rahul Jain & Roshni Shah	6:30
3.	"Mere Dil Ko Tere Dil Ki Zaroorat Hai" (Male)	Rahul Jain, Sandeep Jahaal & Vandana Khandelwal	Rahul Jain	Rahul Jain	5:44
4.	"Mere Dil Ko Tere Dil Ki Zaroorat Hai" (Female)	Rahul Jain, Sandeep Jahaal & Vandana Khandelwal	Rahul Jain	Ankita Dwivedi	1:47
Total length:					18:33

== Reception ==
=== Ratings ===
According to BARC India reports, Bepannaah debuted with 5.8 million impressions and a 2.7 TRP. Thus, making it to the list of top five shows in its very first week.

=== Reviews ===
The Times Of India said, "The show comes as a breath of fresh air and attempts at a new story filled with mystery and romance."

India Today noted, "Bepannaah is as intense as it could get: be it romance or murder mystery and as fresh as an Indian TV show can be in terms of packaging and treatment. Jennifer Winget and Harshad Chopda deliver a stupendous performance.”

Bollywood Life commented, "Bepannaah with its finesse is a welcome change. The story promises to be an enthralling one."

== Awards and nominations ==
Year	Award	Category	Nominee	Result	Reference
2018	Gold Awards	Best Actor Male	Harshad Chopda	Nominated	
2018	Gold Awards	Best Actor Female	Jennifer Winget	Nominated	
2018	Gold Awards	Best Actor Female Critics	Jennifer Winget	Won	
2018	Gold Awards	Best Onscreen Jodi	Harshad Chopda & Jennifer Winget	Nominated	
2018	Gold Awards	Best Actress in a Negative Role	Vaishnavi Dhanraj	Nominated	
2018	Gold Awards	Best Show	Bepannaah	Nominated	
2018	Indian Television Academy Awards	Best Actor Drama Popular	Harshad Chopda	Won	
2018	Indian Television Academy Awards	Best Actress Drama Popular	Jennifer Winget	Nominated	
2018	Indian Television Academy Awards	Best Drama Popular	Bepannaah	Won	
2018	Indian Television Academy Awards	Best Actress Drama Jury	Jennifer Winget	Nominated	
2018	Indian Television Academy Awards	Best Actress in a Negative Role	Parineeta Borthakur	Nominated	
2018	Indian Television Academy Awards	Best Drama Jury	Bepannaah	Nominated	
2018	Indian Television Academy Awards	Best Director Drama	Aniruddha Rajderkar	Won	
2018	Indian Television Academy Awards	Best Singer	Rahul Jain	Nominated	
2018	Indian Television Academy Awards	Best Song Track	Rahul Jain	Nominated	
2018	Indian Television Academy Awards	Best Lyricist	Rahul Jain	Nominated	
2018	Asian Viewers Television Awards	Male Actor of the Year	Harshad Chopda	Won	
2018	Asian Viewers Television Awards	Female Actor of the Year	Jennifer Winget	Nominated	
2018	Asian Viewers Television Awards	Soap of the Year	Bepannaah	Nominated	
2019	Lions Gold Awards	Best Actor Popular	Harshad Chopda	Won	
2019	Lions Gold Awards	Best Actress Popular	Jennifer Winget	Won	
2019	Lions Gold Awards	Best Supporting Actor Male	Rajesh Khattar	Won	
2019	Indian Telly Awards	Fan Favorite Actor	Harshad Chopda	Nominated	
2019	Indian Telly Awards	Fan Favorite Actress	Jennifer Winget	Won	
2019	Indian Telly Awards	Fan Favorite Jodi	Harshad Chopda & Jennifer Winget	Nominated	
2019	Indian Telly Awards	Best Actor in Supporting Role Popular	Shehzad Shaikh	Nominated	
2019	Indian Telly Awards	Best Actor in Negative Role Popular	Rajesh Khattar	Won	
2019	Indian Telly Awards	Best Actress in Negative Role Popular	Parineeta Borthakur	Nominated	
2019	Indian Telly Awards	Best Daily Series Popular	Bepannaah	Nominated	
2019	Indian Television Academy Awards	Best Actor Drama Popular	Harshad Chopda	Nominated	
2019	Asian Viewers Television Awards	Male Actor of the Year	Harshad Chopda	Won	
2019	Asian Viewers Television Awards	Female Actor of the Year	Jennifer Winget	Nominated	
2019	Asian Viewers Television Awards	Soap of the Year	Bepannaah	Won	
