= ITA Award for Best Actor Drama Popular =

Indian Television Academy award

ITA Award for Best Actor Popular
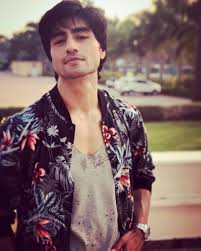
- The 2025 recipient: Harshad Chopda
- Type: Best Actor Popular
- Awarded for: Most Popular Actor in Drama Category
- Country: India
- Presented by: Indian Television Academy Awards
- Formerly called: Desh Ka Sitara
- First award: 2001
- Final award: 2025

Highlights
- Most wins: Harshad Chopda (6)
- Most nominations: Harshad Chopda (10)
- First winner: Amar Upadhyay for Kyunki Saas Bhi Kabhi Bahu Thi (2001)
- Latest winner: Harshad Chopda for Bade Achhe Lagte Hain 4 (2025)
- Website: Website

ITA Award for Best Actor Drama Popular is an award given by the Indian Television Academy as a part of its annual event to the male actor who receives the highest votes by the public. First awarded in 2001, the award was originally named Desh Ka Sitara but was later renamed to Best Actor Popular.

== Superlatives ==
Harshad Chopda holds the record for the most wins in the category, having won the award six times. Chopda has achieved five consecutive wins from 2021 to 2025.

Ronit Roy, Dheeraj Dhoopar, Karan Mehra, and Nakuul Mehta are next in line, each of whom have won the award twice.

== Winners and nominees ==
=== 2000s ===
Year	Photo	Actor	Character	Show	Ref
2001		Amar Upadhyay	Mihir Virani	Kyunki Saas Bhi Kabhi Bahu Thi	
2001		Kiran Karmarkar	Om Agarwal	Kahaani Ghar Ghar Kii	
2001		Harsh Chhaya	Lalit Sharma	Justujoo	
2001		Shivaji Satam	A.C.P. Pradyuman	CID	
2001		Kanwaljit Singh	Gautam Kapoor	Saans	
2002		Cezanne Khan	Anurag Basu	Kasautii Zindagii Kay	
2002		Kiran Karmarkar	Om Agarwal	Kahaani Ghar Ghar Kii	
2002		Amar Upadhyay	Mihir Virani	Kyunki Saas Bhi Kabhi Bahu Thi	
2002		Varun Badola	Dev Malik	Des Mein Niklla Hoga Chand	
2002		Suresh Oberoi	Dr. Raj Pradhan	Dhadkan	
2003		Ronit Roy	Mihir Virani	Kyunki Saas Bhi Kabhi Bahu Thi	
2003		Kiran Karmarkar	Om Agarwal	Kahaani Ghar Ghar Kii	
2003		Cezanne Khan	Anurag Basu	Kasautii Zindagii Kay	
2003		Mihir Mishra	Dr. Rahul Mishra	Sanjivani - A Medical Boon	
2004		Ronit Roy	Mihir Virani	Kyunki Saas Bhi Kabhi Bahu Thi	
2004		Rajeev Khandelwal	Sujal Garewal	Kahiin to Hoga	
2004		Varun Badola	Abhimanyu Saxena	Astitva...Ek Prem Kahani	
2004		Apurva Agnihotri	Armaan Suri	Jassi Jaissi Koi Nahin	
2004		Kiran Karmarkar	Om Agarwal	Kahaani Ghar Ghar Kii	
2005		Hiten Tejwani	Karan Virani	Kyunki Saas Bhi Kabhi Bahu Thi	
2005		Ronit Roy	Rishabh Bajaj	Kasautii Zindagii Kay	
2005		Apurva Agnihotri	Armaan Suri	Jassi Jaissi Koi Nahin	
2005		Rajeev Khandelwal	Sujal Garewal	Kahiin to Hoga	
2005		Hussain Kuwajerwala	Sumit Wadhwa	Kumkum – Ek Pyara Sa Bandhan	
2006		Rohit Roy	Rahul Lamba	Viraasat	
2006		Ram Kapoor	Jai Walia	Kasamh Se	
2006		Eijaz Khan	Kavya Nanda	Kkavyanjali	
2006		Sharad Kelkar	Nahar Singh	Saat Phere: Saloni Ka Safar	
2006		Hussain Kuwajerwala	Sumit Wadhwa	Kumkum – Ek Pyara Sa Bandhan	
2007		Rajat Tokas	Prithviraj Chauhan	Dharti Ka Veer Yodha Prithviraj Chauhan	
2007		Sharad Malhotra	Sagar Pratap Singh	Banoo Main Teri Dulhann	
2007		Ram Kapoor	Jai Walia	Kasamh Se	
2007		Rajeev Khandelwal	Captain Rajveer Singh Shekhawat	Left Right Left	
2007		Rohit Roy	Rahul Lamba	Viraasat	
2008		Angad Hasija	Aalekh Rajvansh	Sapna Babul Ka...Bidaai	
2008		Ram Kapoor	Jai Walia	Kasamh Se	
2008		Harshad Chopda	Prem Juneja	Kis Desh Mein Hai Meraa Dil	
2008		Sharad Malhotra	Sagar Pratap Singh	Banoo Main Teri Dulhann	
2008		Shabbir Ahluwalia	Milind Mishra	Kayamath	
2009		Karan Mehra	Naitik Singhania	Yeh Rishta Kya Kehlata Hai	
2009		Ronit Roy	Dharamraj Mahiyavanshi	Bandini	
2009		Sushant Singh Rajput	Manav Deshmukh	Pavitra Rishta	
2009		Avinash Sachdev	Dev Purohit	Chotti Bahu	
2009		Angad Hasija	Alekh Rajvansh	Sapna Babul Ka...Bidaai	

=== 2010s ===
Year	Photo	Actor	Character	Show	Ref
2010		Sushant Singh Rajput	Manav Deshmukh	Pavitra Rishta	
2010		Karan Mehra	Naitik Singhania	Yeh Rishta Kya Kehlata Hai	
2010		Arhaan Behll	Krishna Singh	Mann Kee Awaaz Pratigya	
2010		Ronit Roy	Dharamraj Mahiyavanshi	Bandini	
2010		Nandish Sandhu	Veer Singh Bundela	Uttaran	
2011		Arhaan Behll	Krishna Singh	Mann Kee Awaaz Pratigya	
2011		Sushant Singh Rajput	Manav Deshmukh	Pavitra Rishta	
2011		Harshad Chopda	Anurag Ganguly	Tere Liye	
2011		Karan Mehra	Naitik Singhania	Yeh Rishta Kya Kehlata Hai	
2011		Nandish Sandhu	Veer Singh Bundela	Uttaran	
2012		Barun Sobti	Arnav Singh Raizada	Iss Pyaar Ko Kya Naam Doon?	
2012		Samir Soni	Kunal Chopra	Parichay	
2012		Gurmeet Choudhary	Maan Singh Khurana	Geet – Hui Sabse Parayi	
2012		Dilip Joshi	Jethalal Gada	Taarak Mehta Ka Ooltah Chashmah	
2012		Kushal Tandon	Virat Singh Vadhera	Ek Hazaaron Mein Meri Behna Hai	
2013		Karan Singh Grover	Asad Ahmed Khan	Qubool Hai	
2013		Ram Kapoor	Ram Kapoor	Bade Achhe Lagte Hain	
2013		Anas Rashid	Sooraj Rathi	Diya Aur Baati Hum	
2013		Gurmeet Choudhary	Yash Sindhia	Punar Vivaah	
2013		Vivian Dsena	Rishabh Kundra	Madhubala - Ek Ishq Ek Junoon	
2014		Harshad Arora	Zain Abdullah	Beintehaa	
2014		Anas Rashid	Sooraj Rathi	Diya Aur Baati Hum	
2014		Ashish Sharma	Rudra Pratap Ranawat	Rangrasiya	
2014		Shabir Ahluwalia	Abhishek Mehra	Kumkum Bhagya	
2014		Shaheer Sheikh	Arjun	Mahabharat	
2015		Karan Mehra	Naitik Singhania	Yeh Rishta Kya Kehlata Hai	
2015		Shabir Ahluwalia	Abhishek Mehra	Kumkum Bhagya	
2015		Karan Patel	Raman Bhalla	Yeh Hai Mohabbatein	
2015		Shakti Arora	Ranveer Vaghela	Meri Aashiqui Tum Se Hi	
2016		Shabir Ahluwalia	Abhishek Mehra	Kumkum Bhagya	
2016		Shaheer Sheikh	Dev Dixit	Kuch Rang Pyar Ke Aise Bhi	
2016		Karan Patel	Raman Bhalla	Yeh Hai Mohabbatein	
2016		Vivian Dsena	Harman Singh	Shakti - Astitva Ke Ehsaas Ki	
2016		Shravan Reddy	Aryan Chimaji	Krishnadasi	
2017		Nakuul Mehta	Shivaay Singh Oberoi	Ishqbaaaz	
2017		Vivian Dsena	Harman Singh	Shakti - Astitva Ke Ehsaas Ki	
2017		Aasif Sheikh	Vibhuti Narayan Mishra	Bhabiji Ghar Par Hain!	
2017		Zain Imam	Neil Khanna	Naamkarann	
2017		Barun Sobti	Advay Singh Raizada	Iss Pyaar Ko Kya Naam Doon 3	
2018		Harshad Chopda	Aditya Hooda	Bepannah	
2018		Nakuul Mehta	Shivaay Singh Oberoi	Ishqbaaaz	
2018		Randeep Rai	Sameer Maheshwari	Yeh Un Dinon Ki Baat Hai	
2018		Zain Imam	Neil Khanna	Naamkarann	
2018		Vivian Dsena	Harman Singh	Shakti - Astitva Ke Ehsaas Ki	
2019		Dheeraj Dhoopar	Karan Luthra	Kundali Bhagya	
2019		Harshad Chopda	Aditya Hooda	Bepannah	
2019		Randeep Rai	Sameer Maheshwari	Yeh Un Dinon Ki Baat Hai	
2019		Vivian Dsena	Harman Singh	Shakti - Astitva Ke Ehsaas Ki	

=== 2020s ===
Year	Photo	Actor	Character	Show	Ref
2020		Dheeraj Dhoopar	Karan Luthra	Kundali Bhagya	
2020		Sudhanshu Pandey	Vanraj Shah	Anupamaa	
2020		Rrahul Sudhir	Vansh Raisinghania	Ishq Mein Marjawan 2	
2020		Sharad Malhotra	Veeranshu Singhania	Naagin 5	
2020		Sumedh Mudgalkar	Krishn	RadhaKrishn	
2021		Harshad Chopda	Abhimanyu Birla	Yeh Rishta Kya Kehlata Hai	
2021		Nakuul Mehta	Ram Kapoor	Bade Achhe Lagte Hain 2	
2021		Gaurav Khanna	Anuj Kapadia	Anupamaa	
2021		Abrar Qazi	Rudraksh Khurana	Yeh Hai Chahatein	
2021		Mohsin Khan	Kartik Goenka	Yeh Rishta Kya Kehlata Hai	
2021		Sumedh Mudgalkar	Krishna	RadhaKrishn	
2022		Harshad Chopda	Abhimanyu Birla	Yeh Rishta Kya Kehlata Hai	
2022		Gaurav Khanna	Anuj Kapadia	Anupamaa	
2022		Sumedh Mudgalkar	Krishna	RadhaKrishn	
2022		Karan Wahi	Aditya Singh	Channa Mereya	
2022		Karan Kundra	Host	Dance Deewane Junior	
2022		Maniesh Paul	Host	India's Best Dancer	
2023		Harshad Chopda	Abhimanyu Birla	Yeh Rishta Kya Kehlata Hai	
2023		Nakuul Mehta	Ram Kapoor	Bade Achhe Lagte Hain 2	
2023		Adnan Khan	Viaan Raghuvanshi	Katha Ankahee	
2023		Harshad Arora	Dr. Satya Adhikari	Ghum Hai Kisikey Pyaar Meiin	
2023		Sudhanshu Pandey	Vanraj Shah	Anupamaa	
2024		Harshad Chopda	Abhimanyu Birla	Yeh Rishta Kya Kehlata Hai	
2024		Krushal Ahuja	Aniruddh Bose	Jhanak	
2024		Mahir Pandhi	Digvijay Mahajan	Vanshaj	
2024		Mishkat Varma	Adhiraj Pradhan	Kavya – Ek Jazbaa, Ek Junoon	
2024		Rohit Purohit	Armaan Poddar	Yeh Rishta Kya Kehlata Hai	
2025		Harshad Chopda	Rishabh Kapoor	Bade Achhe Lagte Hain 4	
2025		Arjit Taneja	Virat Singh Ahuja	Kaise Mujhe Tum Mil Gaye	
2025		Rohit Purohit	Armaan Poddar	Yeh Rishta Kya Kehlata Hai	
2025		Krushal Ahuja	Aniruddha Bose	Jhanak	
2025		Shagun Pandey	Ved Birla	Saru	
2026		Harshad Chopda	Rishabh Kapoor	Bade Achhe Lagte Hain 4	
2026		Parth Samthaan	Mufti Mohammed Mahid Niyazi	Seher Hone Ko Hai	
2026		Namik Paul	Aryaman Suri	Naagin 7	
2026		Shagun Pandey	Ved Birla	Saru	
2026		Himanshu Awasthi	Sameer Singh Shekhawat	Rimjhim: Choti Umar Bada Safar	

== See also ==
- ITA Award for Best Actress Drama Popular
- ITA Award for Best Actor Drama Jury
- ITA Award for Best Actress Drama Jury
