= Harshad Chopda =

Indian television actor (born 1983)

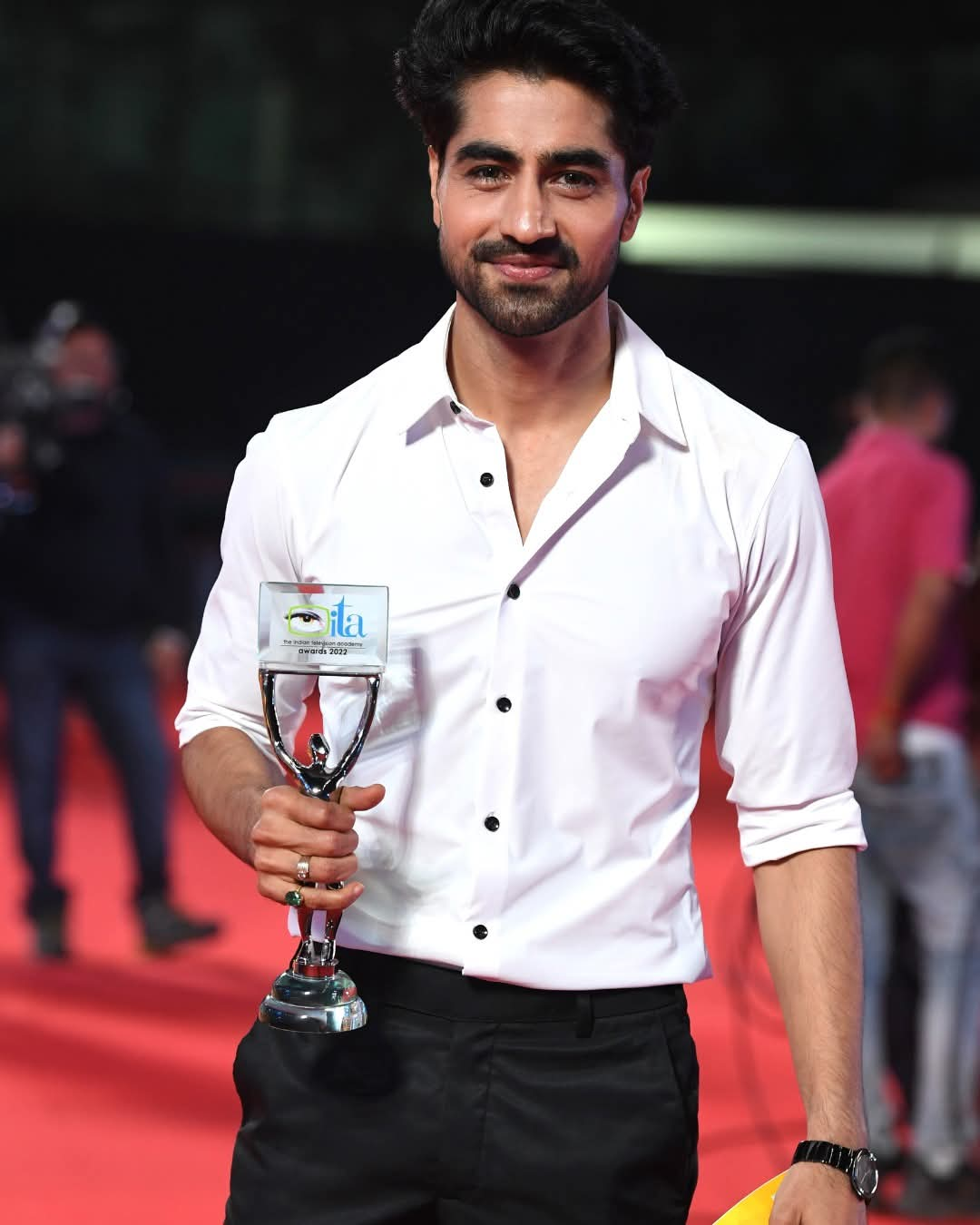
- Chopda at the 24th Indian Television Academy Awards
- Born: Harshad Chopda; 17 May 1983 (age 43); Gondia, Maharashtra, India
- Education: PES Modern College of Engineering, Pune
- Occupation: Actor
- Years active: 2006–present
- Known for: Kis Desh Mein Hai Meraa Dil; Tere Liye; Humsafars; Bepannah; Yeh Rishta Kya Kehlata Hai; Lock Upp 2: Sach Ya Saza
- Awards: Indian Television Academy Awards; Indian Telly Awards; Asian Viewers Television Awards; Gold Awards

Signature
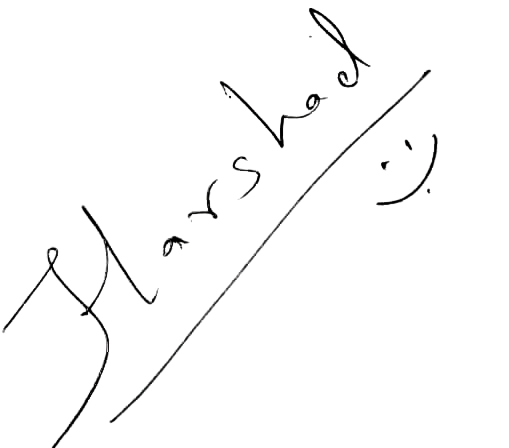

Harshad Chopda (born 17 May 1983) is an Indian actor known for his performances on Hindi television. His work has earned him seven Indian Television Academy Awards, six of which are Best Actor Popular, in addition to three Indian Telly Awards and two Asian Viewers Television Awards. Chopda is also one of the highest paid and most awarded actors in Indian television history.

He made his acting debut in 2006 with the drama show Mamta and went onto feature in shows like Left Right Left and Amber Dhara. He received wider reach for his portrayal of Prem Juneja in Kis Desh Mein Hai Meraa Dil and Anurag Ganguly in Tere Liye. Chopda expanded his work profile by essaying Mohan Gala in Dharampatni, Raghavendra "Raghav" Pratap Singh in Saubhagyavati Bhava and Sahir Azeem Chaudhary in Humsafars. He then established himself as a successful leading actor by playing Captain Aditya Hooda in Bepannah followed by Dr. Abhimanyu Birla in Yeh Rishta Kya Kehlata Hai and Rishabh Kapoor in Bade Achhe Lagte Hain 4.

== Early life and education ==
Chopda was born on 17 May 1983 in Gondia, Maharashtra. His Marwari family has roots in the city of Balotra, which is located in the Barmer district of Rajasthan. He finished his school education from Rabindranath Tagore School. Chopda then graduated in computer engineering from PES Modern College of Engineering, Pune.

== Career ==
=== Debut and breakthrough (2006–2017) ===
Chopda started his television career in 2006 with Zee TV's Mamta where he played Karan Srivastav. From 2006 to 2007, he essayed the role of Cadet Ali Baig in SAB TV's Left Right Left. This was followed by Sony TV's Amber Dhara where he portrayed Akshat Mehra opposite Kashmira Irani.

From 2008 to 2010, he played Prem Juneja in Star Plus's Kis Desh Mein Hai Meraa Dil opposite Additi Gupta. The show was a big success and broke records. From 2010 to 2011, Chopda essayed the role of Anurag Ganguly in Star Plus's Tere Liye opposite Anupriya Kapoor. For it, he won the Indian Television Academy Award for GR8! Face of the Year and the Indian Telly Award for Best Actor In Leading Role Male Popular.

From 2011 to 2012, he portrayed Mohan Gala in NDTV Imagine's Dharampatni opposite Aasiya Kazi. He followed it up in 2012 by playing Raghavendra Pratap "Raghav" Singh in Life OK's Dil Se Di Dua... Saubhagyavati Bhava? opposite Sriti Jha. From 2014 to 2015, he was seen portraying Sahir Azeem Chaudhary in Sony TV's Humsafars opposite Shivya Pathania. He essayed the role of a frosty businessman with a past.

In 2017, Chopda made his film debut in 2016 The End where he played Rahul. The movie also co-starred Priya Banerjee, Divyendu Sharma and Kiku Sharda.

=== Bepannah and further success (2018–2024) ===
In 2018, he portrayed Aditya Hooda in Colors TV's Bepannah opposite Jennifer Winget. The show made a successful debut, entering the list of top five Hindi language shows in its first week. In their review, Times of India said, "Harshad Chopda is a complete natural and plays his part effortlessly." On the other hand, India Today felt, "Harshad nails his character of Aditya with some black humour and hard-hitting one-liners." For his portrayal, he won the Indian Television Academy Award for Best Actor Popular.

In 2020, he starred in Stebin Ben's song Juda Kar Diya opposite Erica Fernandes. Chopda was also a part of the musical series Aakhiri Mulaqaat which spanned a total of four songs opposite Smriti Kalra.

From 2021 to 2023, he played Dr. Abhimanyu Birla in Star Plus's Yeh Rishta Kya Kehlata Hai opposite Pranali Rathod. In the popular and long-running family drama, his role was that of a heart surgeon. He was the lead of the third generation and won the Indian Television Academy Award for Best Actor Popular four years in a row for it.

=== BALH 4 and beyond (2025–present) ===
In 2025, Chopda portrayed Rishabh Kapoor, a businessman under an alias to get revenge for betrayal, in Bade Achhe Lagte Hain 4. He essayed the role opposite Shivangi Joshi. He called the series a slow-burn: delicate, and deeply human with the concept of two unlikely people; both bruised by life, carrying silent scars who find themselves entangled in a relationship that neither of them saw coming. He described his character as a mystery waiting to be solved or unsolved. In 2026, Chopda participated in Netflix based reality series Lock Upp 2: Sach Ya Saza and voluntarily walked out of the competition in the sixth week while placed 8th, rather than being eliminated.

== Media image ==
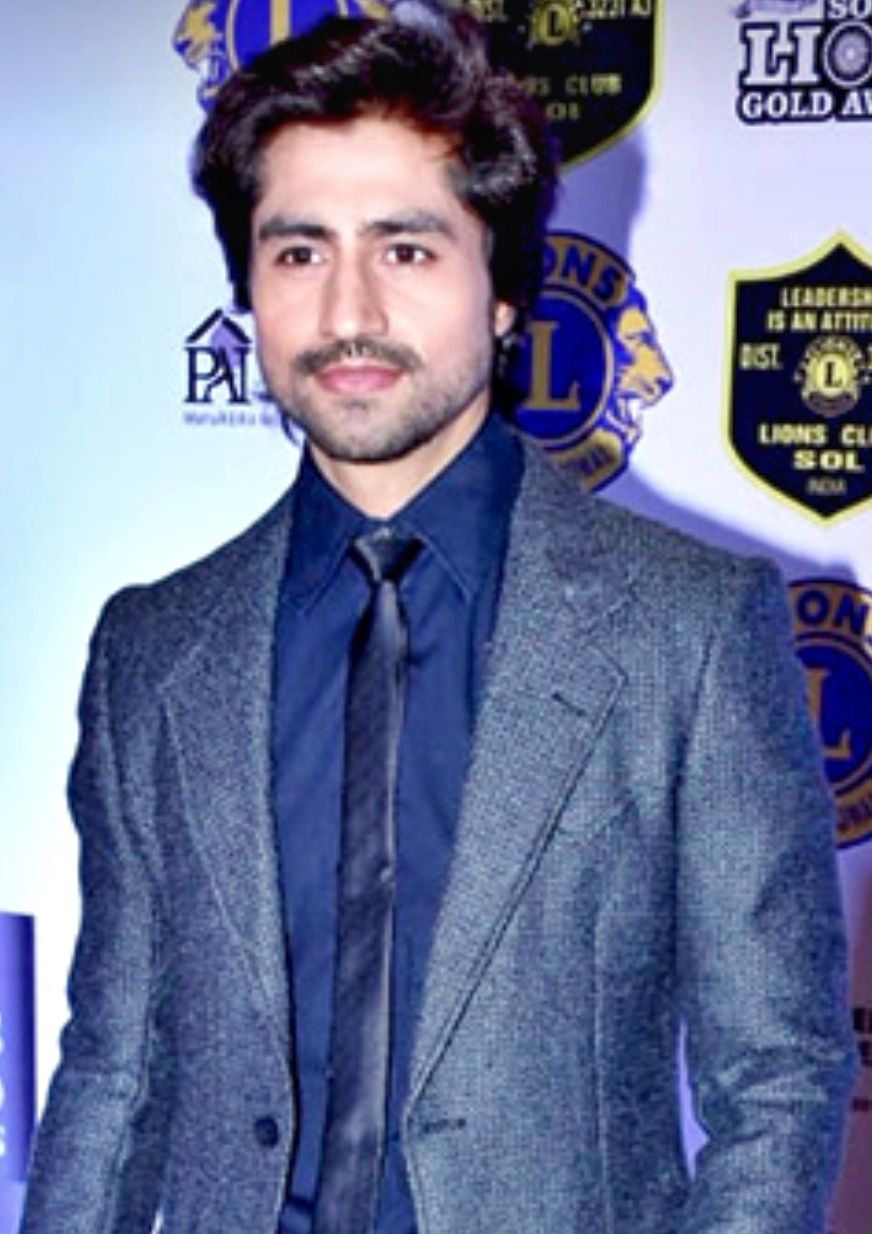

Since 2017, Chopda has been placed on The Times of India's Most Desirable Television Men list. He was ranked 16th in 2017, 8th in 2018 and 8th in 2019. In 2018, his on-screen pairing with Jennifer Winget in Bepannah, won them the title of Times of India's Most Favourite Onscreen Jodi.

Chopda was also placed on Eastern Eye's 50 Most Sexiest Asian Men list. He was listed 19th in 2018 and 6th in 2019. In 2023, he was placed at 30th in Eastern Eye's Top 50 Asian Stars of 2023 list.

In September 2023, he was reported to be one of the highest-paid actors on Hindi television.

== Filmography ==
=== Films ===
Year	Title	Role	Language	Ref
2015	Bondhu Amar	Joy	Bengali	
2017	2016 The End	Rahul	Hindi	

=== Television ===
Year	Title	Role	Ref(s)
2006	Mamta	Karan Srivastav	
2006–2007	Left Right Left	Cadet Ali Baig	
2007	Amber Dhara	Akshat Mehra	
2008–2010	Kis Desh Mein Hai Meraa Dil	Prem Juneja	
2008	Kahaani Hamaaray Mahaabhaarat Ki	Arjuna	
2010–2011	Tere Liye	Anurag Ganguly	
2011–2012	Dharampatni	Mohan Gala	
2012	Dil Se Di Dua... Saubhagyavati Bhava?	Raghavendra "Raghav" Pratap Singh	
2014–2015	Humsafars	Sahir Azeem Chaudhary	
2018	Bepannah	Captain Aditya "Adi" Hooda	
2021–2023	Yeh Rishta Kya Kehlata Hai	Dr. Abhimanyu "Abhi" Birla	
2025	Bade Achhe Lagte Hain 4	Rishabh Kapoor	
2026	Lock Upp 2: Sach Ya Saza	Contestant (8th place)	

=== Music videos ===
Year	Title	Singer(s)	Notes	Ref(s)
2020	"Juda Kar Diya"	Stebin Ben		
2021	"Humsafar"	Suyyash Rai	Musical series: Aakhiri Mulaqaat	
2021	"Pyaar Ke Saleeqe"	Lakshay Chaudhary; Aakanksha Sharma	Musical series: Aakhiri Mulaqaat	
2021	"Ghalat"	Himani Kapoor	Musical series: Aakhiri Mulaqaat	
2021	"Aakhiri Mulaqaat"	Suyyash Rai	Musical series: Aakhiri Mulaqaat	

== Awards and nominations ==
Harshad Chopda awards and nominations
Awards and nominations
Award	Wins	Nominations
Indian Television Academy Awards	7	5
Indian Telly Awards	3	3
Asian Viewers Television Awards	2	0
Gold Awards	0	4
Others	4	6

Totals (Note: Certain award groups do not simply award one winner. They acknowledge several different recipients, have runners-up, and have third place. Since this is a specific recognition and is different from losing an award, runner-up mentions are considered wins in this award tally. For simplification and to avoid errors, each award in this list has been presumed to have had a prior nomination.)
- Wins: 16
- Nominations: 18

=== Television awards ===
Year	Award	Category	Work	Result	Ref.
2008	Indian Telly Awards	Fan Favorite Actor	Kis Desh Mein Hai Meraa Dil	Nominated	
2008	Indian Television Academy Awards	Best Actor Drama Popular	Kis Desh Mein Hai Meraa Dil	Nominated	
2008	Gold Awards	Best Actor in a Lead Role	Kis Desh Mein Hai Meraa Dil	Nominated	
2010	Indian Television Academy Awards	Best Actor Drama Jury	Tere Liye	Nominated	
2010	Indian Television Academy Awards	Face of the Year	Tere Liye	Won	
2010	Indian Telly Awards	Fan Favorite Actor	Tere Liye	Won	
2011	Indian Television Academy Awards	Best Actor Drama Popular	Tere Liye	Nominated	
2011	Gold Awards	Best Actor in a Lead Role	Tere Liye	Nominated	
2018	Gold Awards	Best Actor in a Lead Role	Bepannah	Nominated	
2018	Gold Awards	Best Onscreen Jodi	Bepannah	Nominated	
2018	Indian Television Academy Awards	Best Actor Drama Popular	Bepannah	Won	
2018	Asian Viewers Television Awards	Male Actor of the Year	Bepannah	Won	
2019	Lions Gold Awards	Best Actor Popular	Bepannah	Won	
2019	Indian Telly Awards	Fan Favorite Actor	Bepannah	Nominated	
2019	Indian Telly Awards	Fan Favorite Jodi	Bepannah	Nominated	
2019	Indian Television Academy Awards	Best Actor Drama Popular	Bepannah	Nominated	
2019	Asian Viewers Television Awards	Male Actor of the Year	Bepannah	Won	
2021	Indian Television Academy Awards	Best Actor Drama Popular	Yeh Rishta Kya Kehlata Hai	Won	
2022	Indian Television Academy Awards	Best Actor Drama Popular	Yeh Rishta Kya Kehlata Hai	Won	
2023	Iconic Gold Awards	Best Actor Television Popular	Yeh Rishta Kya Kehlata Hai	Won	
2023	Indian Telly Awards	Fan Favorite Actor	Yeh Rishta Kya Kehlata Hai	Won	
2023	Indian Telly Awards	Fan Favorite Jodi	Yeh Rishta Kya Kehlata Hai	Won	
2023	Indian Television Academy Awards	Best Actor Drama Popular	Yeh Rishta Kya Kehlata Hai	Won	
2023	Indian Television Academy Awards	Best Actor Drama Jury	Yeh Rishta Kya Kehlata Hai	Nominated	
2024	Pinkvilla Screen and Style Icons Awards	Best Actor TV Male	Yeh Rishta Kya Kehlata Hai	Nominated	
2024	Indian Television Academy Awards	Best Actor Drama Popular	Yeh Rishta Kya Kehlata Hai	Won	
2025	Lions Gold Awards	Best Actor Popular	Bade Achhe Lagte Hain 4	Won	
2025	Indian Television Academy Awards	Best Actor Drama Popular	Bade Achhe Lagte Hain 4	Won	
2026	Indian Television Academy Awards	Best Actor Drama Popular	Bade Achhe Lagte Hain 4	Pending	

=== Other awards ===
Year	Award	Category	Result	Ref.
2019	Gold Glam and Style Awards	Most Fit Actor	Nominated	
2019	Gold Glam and Style Awards	Most Stylish Actor	Nominated	
2019	Gold Glam and Style Awards	TV Personality of the Year Male	Nominated	
2020	Gold Glam and Style Awards	Fitness Icon Male	Won	
2020	Gold Glam and Style Awards	Hotstepper Male	Nominated	
2020	Gold Glam and Style Awards	Style Icon Male	Nominated	

== See also ==
- List of Indian television actors
- List of Hindi television actors
