= Beyhadh =

Indian romantic television series

- Genre: Thriller; Psychological; Crime; Romance; Revenge
- Created by: Prateek R Sharma
- Screenplay by: Shilpa F D'Mello; Radhika Anand; Bhupsa
- Story by: Prateek Sharma
- Directed by: Vikram V. Labhe
- Creative director: Ameeta Devadigga
- Starring: Jennifer Winget; Kushal Tandon; Aneri Vajani
- Music by: Mukul Puri; Elvis Nishant
- Country of origin: India
- Original language: Hindi
- No. of seasons: 1
- No. of episodes: 273

Production
- Producers: Prem Krishen; Sunil Mehta
- Production locations: Mumbai; Lonavala; Mauritius
- Cinematography: Hanoz Kerawala
- Editors: Ganga Kacharla; Amit Singh
- Camera setup: Multi-camera
- Running time: 20 minutes
- Production companies: Cinevistaas Limited; LSD Films

Original release
- Network: Sony Entertainment Television
- Release: 11 October 2016 – 27 October 2017

Related
- Beyhadh 2

Beyhadh (transl. Extreme) is an Indian romantic thriller television series which aired from 11 October 2016 to 27 October 2017 on Sony Entertainment Television. It starred Jennifer Winget, Kushal Tandon and Aneri Vajani.

Beyhadh 2 premiered on 2 December 2019 and starred Jennifer Winget, Ashish Chaudhary and Shivin Narang. It went off-air abruptly due to the COVID-19 pandemic.

== Plot ==
Maya Mehrotra, the owner of "Fashion and the City" is a young and successful business tycoon, with net worth of around 900 million dollars suffering from dark past and troubled childhood due to her abusive dad, Ashwin. Carefree and cheerful, Arjun Sharma is a photographer in Maya's company. His childhood friend, lawyer Saanjh Mathur, secretly loves him. Initially, Arjun and Maya are at loggerheads as their opposing natures and perspectives often collide and Maya tries to terminate Arjun many times but he gets a chance and returns and annoys Maya even more but with time the two come closer and start to understand each other. As Arjun rescues Maya in an elevator accident and later, from Ashwin, she falls in love with and proposes him.

A series of circumstances including Maya rescuing Ayaan (Arjun's younger brother) from jail, revealing her past to Arjun, helping him realize his past mistakes and uniting him with his step mother Vandana and completing his family in the process leads to Arjun falling for Maya. Thus, he ends up proposing her in Mauritius, much to Saanjh's dismay. As Maya and Arjun plan their wedding, Ashwin (Maya's father) tries to provoke Saanjh and Vandana (Arjun's mother) against Maya to ruin her wedding. Moreover, he tries to get over her company's shares as well but all in vain as he was murdered. Arjun and Maya get married.

Later, Jhanvi (Maya's mother) gets to know about Ashwin's murderer and tries to expose the truth, however, was pushed off a building by the murderer causing her to go in a coma and was blamed for the murder. Meanwhile, Arjun's flirtatious nature and his extreme friendship with Saanjh irks Maya and she fakes a miscarriage and blames Saanjh, leading to a fall out between Arjun and Saanjh. Hurt, Saanjh leaves for London.

=== Three years later ===
Maya has completely isolated Arjun from everyone. Arjun has realized Maya's mental illness. Saanjh returns to India with her boyfriend Samay Ahuja. Saanjh and Samay are about to get married. Later, it is revealed that Samay has been Maya's obsessive lover for the last eight years.

Maya accuses Ayaan in her fake attempt to rape case with the help of Samay. Later, Saanjh tries to expose Maya but Samay kills Prem (Saanjh's father) to discard all the evidences against Maya. It is revealed that the person behind Ashwin's murder and Jhanvi's accident is none other than Maya, and thus she is blackmailed by Samay. Later, on his wedding day, he abducts Maya but Arjun saves her as she is pregnant with his child and thus gets to know about Samay and Maya's relationship, which makes him hate her.

=== Six months later ===
Maya is in a mental hospital where she admitted herself for her treatment to pretend to be cured. Ayaan tries to expose Maya but she runs her car over him and he gets severely injured. Later, during a fight with Vandana, Maya falls from the stairs and loses her unborn child. Filled with anguish and desire for revenge, Maya kills Vandana.

Maya learns Arjun's feelings of hatred for her, thus, she traps him and fakes her death by knocking him out and then killing and planting her lookalike, Mansi, at the scene of the crime. Arjun is convicted of her murder and is given death sentence. Maya decides to die to unite Arjun in her after life but is saved by Samay.

Arjun believes that Maya is alive and escapes from jail to expose Maya. Maya joins hands with Samay to plot against Arjun and Saanjh but Arjun convinces Samay that Maya is only using him. Maya kills Samay and abducts Saanjh. Arjun rescues Saanjh and Maya is proved guilty in court after her own mother testifies against her and is sentenced to be hanged. Arjun realizes his love for Saanjh, and so does Saanjh and both decide to get married, much to Maya's dismay. She sends many people to injure and kill Saanjh, but none of her plan work. On the day Maya was going to be hanged, her punishment changed to life time prison. Finally, Arjun and Saanjh get married. Saanjh is still scared of Maya. Later, Maya is sent to solitary confinement.

=== Five years later ===
Maya is still in jail. Arjun has become a millionaire and has tight security around the house. Ayaan is a widower and has a daughter named Aarohi. Saanjh and Arjun raise his child together. Maya escapes from jail by, once again, faking her death.

Maya intentionally hurts Ayaan's daughter due to which Ayaan moves away from Arjun with Arohi. Later, Arjun and Saanjh decide to use a surrogate, as Saanjh cannot conceive. Maya manages to somehow become their surrogate leaving Arjun and Saanjh shocked.

Saanjh decides to care for Maya despite her longtime animosity towards her, whilst Maya plots against everyone. As the pregnancy nears an end, Maya asks Saanjh for Arjun in exchange for the baby, but he expresses his hatred for Maya and love for Saanjh. Maya gives birth to a baby girl and runs away with her. Saanjh approaches Maya, who points the gun at her. Arjun shoots Maya from behind. Saanjh finds out the gun which Maya pointed on her was empty. Thus Maya dies by Arjun's hands, confessing her obsessive and limitless love for him.

== Cast ==
=== Main ===
- Jennifer Winget as Maya Mehrotra: Ashwin and Jhanvi's daughter; Arjun's former wife and obsessive lover; Samay's love interest, owner of 'Fashion and the City", Arjun and Saanjh's baby surrogate mother (2016–2017)
  - Mansi : Maya's friend in the mental asylum, whom Maya made her lookalike through plastic surgery, who had an abusive married life.
- Kushal Tandon as Arjun "Duffer" Sharma: Rajeev and Raksha's son; Vandana's step son; Ayaan's half-brother; Maya's former husband and Saanjh's husband (2016–2017)
- Aneri Vajani as Saanjh "Dusky" Mathur Sharma : Prem and Suman's daughter; Shubh's sister; Arjun's childhood friend turned wife (2016–2017)

=== Recurring ===
- Kavita Ghai as Jhanvi Mehrotra: Ashwin's widow; Maya's mother (2016–17)
- Rajesh Khattar as Ashwin Mehrotra: Jhanvi's husband; Maya's father (2016–17)
- Swati Shah as Vandana Sharma: Rajeev's second wife; Arjun's step-mother; Ayaan's mother (2016–17)
- Sumit Bhardwaj as Ayaan Sharma: Rajeev and Vandana's son; Arjun's half-brother; Simmi's widower; Aarohi's father. (2016–17)
- Vaishnavi Rao as Smriti "Simmi" Sharma: Ayaan's wife (2017)
- Vibha Bhagat as Suman Mathur : Prem's widow, Saanjh and Shubh's mother, Vandana's bestfriend. (2016–17)
- Imran Khan as Premnath "Prem" Mathur : Suman's husband, Saanjh and Shubh's father (2016–17)
- Rakshit Wahi as Shubh Mathur : Suman and Prem's son, Saanjh's brother. (2016–17)
- Piyush Sahdev as Rajeev Randhawa : Maya's obsessive lover and stalker since last 8 years. Later, he changed his identity to "Samay Ahuja" (2017)
- Sharad Vyas as Aadesh Malkhani : Saanjh's boss at Law Firm (2016–17)
- Shraddha Jaiswal as Swati Baweja
- Vaishnavi Dhanraj as Advocate Pooja Daschandni (2017)
- Kiran Srinivas as Dr. Jitendra Kumar Srivastava (2016)
- Shraddha Kaul as jailer : Warden at Maya's jail. She ordered to kill Maya but died herself in the process.

== Dubbed version ==
Language	Title	Original release	Network(s)	Last aired
Marathi	Bebhan Prem He बेभान प्रेम हे	16 December 2024	Sony Marathi	8 February 2025

== See also ==
- List of programs broadcast by Sony Entertainment Television
