= Jennifer Winget =

Indian actress (born 1985)

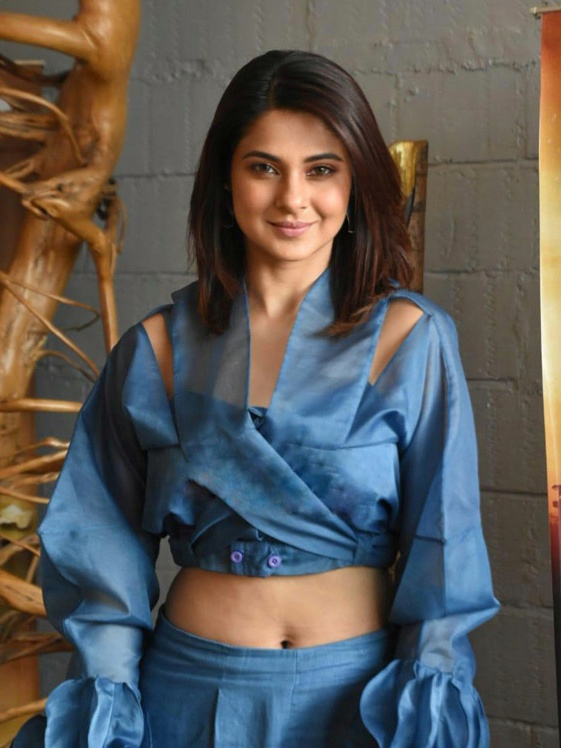
- Winget in 2020
- Born: 30 May 1985 (age 41); Bombay, Maharashtra, India
- Occupation: Actress
- Years active: 1995–present
- Known for: Kasautii Zindagii Kay; Dill Mill Gayye; Saraswatichandra; Beyhadh; Bepannah
- Spouses: Karan Singh Grover (m. 2012; div. 2014); William Ishmael (m. 2026)
- Awards: Full list

Jennifer Winget (born 30 May 1985) is an Indian actress who primarily appears in Hindi television. One of the highest-paid television actresses in India, Winget is a recipient of several accolades including two ITA Awards and two Indian Telly Awards.

Winget started her career as a child actor with the 1995 film Akele Hum Akele Tum and made her television debut in 2002 with Shaka Laka Boom Boom. She later gained recognition for her portrayal of Sneha Bajaj in Kasautii Zindagii Kay and Dr. Riddhima Gupta in Dill Mill Gayye. Winget further established herself as a leading actress with her portrayal of Kumud Sundari Desai in Saraswatichandra, Maya Mehrotra in Beyhadh and Zoya Siddiqui in Bepannah. For Saraswatichandra and Beyhadh, she earned the ITA Award for Best Actress Jury. Winget expanded to web with Code M for which she received a Filmfare OTT Award nomination.

== Early life ==
Winget was born on 30 May 1985 in Bombay, (present-day Mumbai), India. She is the daughter of a Punjabi Hindu mother, Prabha, and a Maharashtrian Christian father, Hemant Winget, and is often mistaken for a person of non-Indian origins due to her western first name.

== Career ==
=== Early work (1995–2009) ===
Winget started her career as a child actor with the 1995 film Akele Hum Akele Tum and later appeared as a School kid in 1997 film Raja Ki Aayegi Baraat which starring Rani Mukerji. At the age of 15 she was seen in the 2000 film Raja Ko Rani Se Pyar Ho Gaya as Tanu, and then appeared as a supporting actor in the Indian film Kuch Naa Kaho at the age of 18. Later, she went on to work in various Indian TV shows. Winget's big break as the lead in television came with the show Karthika, where she played the role of a struggling singer who dreams of making it big.

She later starred in Kasautii Zindagii Kay, where she played Sneha, the daughter of the protagonists Shweta Tiwari and her performance was praised. Then she replaced Kavita Kaushik as Natasha in Kyaa Hoga Nimmo Kaa. In 2007, she was seen playing Svetlana in StarPlus popular drama Kahin To Hoga. From 2007 to 2009 she was portrayed the female protagonist Ganga Bhatia in StarPlus drama Sangam.

In 2008, she participated in Star One's dance reality show Zara Nach Ke Dikha 1 and emerged as the Winner of the show. After winning the former, she hosted the second season of the show along with Dekh India Dekh and the comedy Laughter Ke Phatke both 2009–2010.

=== Breakthrough and success (2010–2015) ===
The same year, she replaced Sukirti Kandpal as Dr. Riddhima Gupta in the medical youth show Dill Mill Gayye opposite Karan Singh Grover and Karan Wahi. It revolves around Young aspiring medical interns join Sanjeevani in hopes of becoming the best doctors.

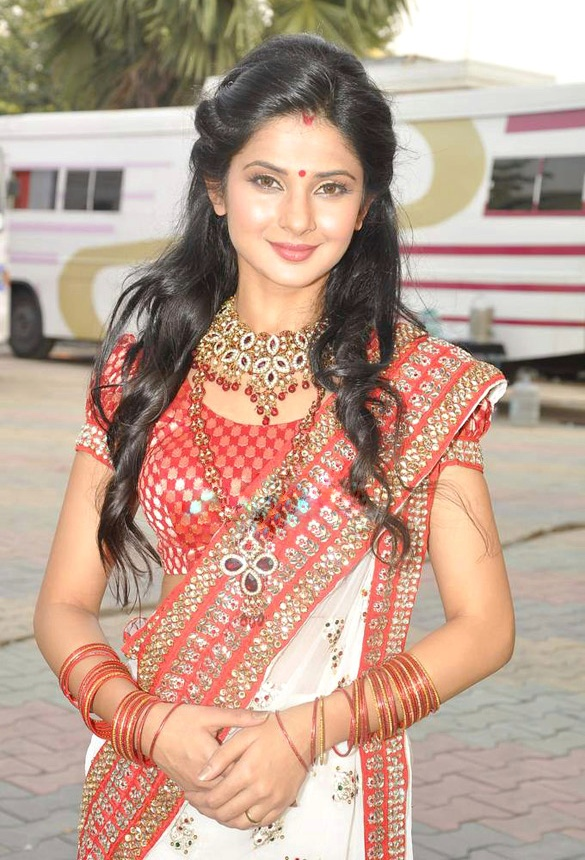
Winget at a shoot for Star Plus in 2011

In 2011, she was seen hosted the comedy show Comedy Ka Maha Muqabala and the dance show Nachle Ve with Saroj Khan's finale episode. Two years later, In 2013, she starred in Sanjay Leela Bhansali's television show Saraswatichandra as the protagonist Kumud Desai opposite Gautam Rode. The story revolves around classic tale of love and heartbreak, Saras and Kumud are soulmates who are repeatedly denied the joy of being together. For her performance she received several accolades including the Indian Television Academy Award for Best Actress Critics.

=== Established actress (2016–2019) ===
Following a two-year absence, Winget returned in 2016 portrayed her notable role Maya Mehrotra in Sony TV's psychological thriller series Beyhadh. Her portrayal of a complex and obsessive character earned her critical acclaim and a massive fan following. For her performance she earned numerous accolades and appreciation including Indian Television Academy Awards for Best Actress (Jury) respectively.

In 2018, she starred as Zoya Siddiqui in Colors TV's romantic drama series Bepannaah opposite Harshad Chopda. It focuses the story of two protagonists Zoya and Aditya who meet in the most unfortunate circumstances. She received praise for her exceptional acting skills, At the Gold Awards, she earned Best Actress (Jury) and Indian Telly Awards for Best Actress in Lead Role.

After the success of first season, In 2019, she starred portrayed the role of Maya Jaisingh in Sony TV's revenge romantic thriller Beyhadh 2 a spiritual successor 2016 series of Beyhadh opposite Ashish Chaudhary and Shivin Narang.

=== Expansion to streaming projects (2020–present) ===
From 2020 to 2022, She ventured into web with Code M, where she portrayed the role of Major Monica Mehra. Ruchi Kaushal for Hindustan Times wrote "Winget makes an impressive debut on the digital platform as an army lawyer who delves into a high-profile case just days before her wedding". For her performance she was nominated at the Filmfare OTT Awards for Best Actress Series (Female).

After a two-year hiatus, Winget portrayed an advocate, Anushka Raisinghani in the 2024 series Raisinghani vs Raisinghani opposite Karan Wahi. Prachi Arya of India Today noted, "Jennifer is impressive as a lawyer whose personal and professional struggles collide. She obviously shares an easy chemistry with Wahi, but when they are together, it is hard to look away from her."

Winget portrayed Sakshi Mathur, a woman who abducted Parineeti Chopra's daughter for revenge in the 2026 series Shaque: Trust No One, opposite Dhruv Choudhry.

== Personal life ==
Winget met actor Karan Singh Grover in the sets of Dill Mill Gayye in 2009. Winget married Grover on 9 April 2012. The couple got divorced in 2014.

In July 2026, Winget married William Ishmael in the United Kingdom in a Christian wedding ceremony. This was followed by a Hindu wedding ceremony in Goa.

== In the media ==
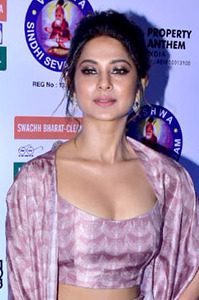
Winget in 2018

Winget's acting performances in Kasautii Zindagii Kay, Dill Mill Gayye, Saraswatichandra, Beyhadh and Bepannah, has established her among the popular and highest-paid actresses of Hindi television. She is widely noted for her powerful and impactful onscreen roles and performances. She was placed fifth in Rediff's "Top 10 Television Actresses" list of 2014. In 2017, The Indian Express placed her first in its "Top 10 Television Actresses" list.

In UK-based newspaper Eastern Eye's list of "50 Sexiest Asian Women", Winget was placed 21st in 2012, 15th in 2013 and 13th in 2018. Winget became Times Most Desirable Women on Television in 2017. She was further placed 2nd in 2018 and 2019, and 5th in 2020. In 2022, Winget contributed to the fight for India's elephants by spending three days volunteering with Wildlife SOS. She has also been cover model for various magazines.

== Filmography ==
=== Films ===
Year	Title	Role	Notes	Ref.
1995	Akele Hum Akele Tum	Young girl	Child actor	
1997	Raja Ki Aayegi Baraat	School kid	Child actor	
2000	Raja Ko Rani Se Pyar Ho Gaya	Tanu	Child actor	
2003	Kuch Naa Kaho	Pooja	Child actor	
2013	Life Reboot Nahi Hoti	Aisha Mittal		
2018	Phir Se...	Kajal Kapoor		

=== Television ===
Year	Title	Role	Notes	Ref.
2002–2003	Shaka Laka Boom Boom	Piya		
2003	Kkusum	Simran		
2003	Kkoi Dil Mein Hai	Preeti		
2004	Karthika	Karthika		
2005–2007	Kasautii Zindagii Kay	Sneha Bajaj		
2006	Kyaa Hoga Nimmo Kaa	Natasha		
2007	Kahin To Hoga	Svetlana		
2007–2009	Sangam	Ganga Bhatia		
2008	Zara Nach Ke Dikha 1	Contestant	Winner	
2009	Dekh India Dekh	Host		
2009	Laughter Ke Phatke	Host		
2009	Comedy Circus 3	Contestant		
2009	Dill Mill Gayye	Dr. Riddhima Gupta		
2010	Zara Nach Ke Dikha 2	Host		
2011	Zor Ka Jhatka: Total Wipeout	Contestant		
2011	Comedy Ka Maha Muqabala	Host		
2011	Nachle Ve with Saroj Khan	Host	Finale episode	
2013–2014	Saraswatichandra	Kumud Desai		
2016–2017	Beyhadh	Maya Mehrotra		
2018	Bepannaah	Zoya Siddiqui		
2019–2020	Beyhadh 2	Maya Jaisingh		

=== Web Series ===
Year	Show	Role	Platform	Ref.
2020–2022	Code M	Major Monica Mehra	ALT Balaji	
2024	Raisinghani VS Raisinghani	Anushka Raisinghani	Sony LIV	
2026	Shaque: Trust No One	Sakshi Mathur	Netflix	

=== Music videos ===
Year	Title	Singer	Ref.
2023	Guli Mata	Shreya Ghoshal, Saad Lamjarred	

==== Special appearances ====
Year	Title	Role	Notes	Ref.
2006	Kahaani Ghar Ghar Kii	Herself		
2007	Kumkum – Ek Pyara Sa Bandhan	Ganga Bhatia		
2009	Perfect Bride	Herself	Dance performance	
2012	Teri Meri Love Stories	Neeti		
2013	Ek Hazaaron Mein Meri Behna Hai	Kumud Desai		
2014	Yeh Rishta Kya Kehlata Hai	Kumud Desai		
2015	Kumkum Bhagya	Herself		
2016	The Kapil Sharma Show	Maya Mehrotra		
2018	Laado 2 – Veerpur Ki Mardani	Zoya Siddiqui		
2018	Silsila Badalte Rishton Ka	Zoya Siddiqui		
2018	Dev 2	Zoya Siddiqui		
2018	Udaan	Zoya Siddiqui		
2018	Dance Deewane	Zoya Siddiqui		
2020	Ishaaron Ishaaron Mein	Maya Jaisingh		

== Accolades ==
Winget has received two Indian Television Academy Awards for her performance in Saraswatichandra and Beyhadh. Additionally, she has received two Indian Telly Awards for Saraswatichandra and Bepannah.

== See also ==
- List of Hindi television actresses
- List of Indian television actresses
- List of Indian film actresses
