= Valliyin Velan =

Tamil language television series

- Genre: Melodrama; Family
- Written by: Boopathy Pandian / Shara Sithara (dialogues)
- Directed by: V. Sadhasivam / Prathap Mani
- Starring: Shreya Anchan; Sidhu Sid
- Country of origin: India
- Original language: Tamil
- No. of episodes: 217

Production
- Producer: John Attaikulam
- Production location: Tamil Nadu
- Cinematography: David Basker
- Editor: Jeyasimman
- Camera setup: Multi-camera
- Running time: 22 minutes
- Production company: Yatra Media Works

Original release
- Network: Zee Tamil
- Release: 2 September 2024 – 25 May 2025

Valliyin Velan is an Indian Tamil language television series that premiered from 2 September 2024 to 25 May 2025 on Zee Tamil. It is produced by John Attaikulam, directed by Prathap Mani / V. Sadhasivam and it stars the real couple Shreya Anchan and Sidhu Sid. The story revolves around an innocent young girl Valli from wealthy family, who has been waiting for years to get the love of her father. It is the remake of Zee Telugu's Ammayi Garu.

== Cast ==
=== Main ===
- Shreya Anchan as Valli: Rathinavel Pandiyan & Janaki's only one daughter & Kadhirvelan's wife (2024–2025)
- Sidhu Sid as Kadhirvelan / Sakthivel: Rathinavel Pandiyan's aide-turned-Son-in-law & Valli's husband (2024–2025)
- Saakshi Siva (2024) / Sridhar (2024–2025) / Girish (2025) as Rathinavel Pandiyan: Valli's father, Janaki's husband, Vedhanayagi's younger brother, Kathivelan's uncle & Kadhirvelan's Father-in-law

=== Recurring ===
- Kanya Bharathi as Vedhanayagi : Rathinavel Pandiyan & Muthupandi's elder sister
- Hari Krishnan as Muthupandi : Vedhanayagi & Rathinavel Pandiyan's younger brother
- Nimisha Anandhan as Janaki : Rathinavel Pandiyan's wife, Valli's mother & Kadhirvelan's paternal aunt & Mother-in-law
- Siddharth Kapilavayi as Ranjith : Vedhanayagi's son & Ranjini elder brother
- Sahasraa as Ammu : Muthupandi & Sumathy's daughter
- Indhra Ravichandran as Sumathy : Muthupandi's wife
- Meena Sellamuthu as Pechi Kadhirvelan : Veni & Anandhi's mother
- Ashokraja as Muthaiya Kadhirvelan : Veni & Anandhi's father
- Devika elogovan as Veni : Kadhirvelan & Anandhi's elder sister, Rajakili wife
- Sree Priya as Anandhi : Kathivelan & Veni's younger sisters & Karthik love interest
- Hemadayal as Renuka : Karthik younger sister & Kadhirvelan's love interest
- Vivin Arumugam as Karthik : Renuka's elder brother, Anandhi love interest
- Singaraja as : Karthik & Renuka's father
- Duraimani as Rajakili : Veni's husband
- Chitra Rebecca as Ranjini : Vedhanayagi's daughter
- Birla Bose as Daramalingam : Vedhanayagi, Rathinavel Pandiyan & Muthupandi's brother
- Indran as : Kadhirvelan friend

=== Special Appearances ===
- Shyam Viswanathan
- Anjana Sreenivasan as Inspector Durga
- Ineya as Governor

== Production ==
=== Development ===
The show was produced by John Attaikulam under the Yatra Media Works. It was second collaboration with Zee Tamil after Kanaa serial. It was directed by Prathap Mani and V. Sadhasivam.

=== Casting ===
Shreya Anchan was cast as Valli and This series the mark comeback Shreya after one years hiatus on TV and also it was second collaboration with Zee Tamil after Rajini serial. Sidhu Sid was cast as the male lead Kathirvelan. This series will be the first series in which they will act together after their marriage. And also this is the second series where the duo will be acting together after the Thirumanam series. Saakshi Siva and Kanya Bharathi was selected to play Rathinavel Pandiyan and Vedhanayagi. From on 14 November, actor Saakshi Siva was replaced by Sridhar. He played the role until his death on 5 April 2025 and he was replaced by Girish.

On 20 March 2025, actress Ineya was brought in for special appearances as Governor.

=== Release ===
The makers released the first official Launch Promo for Valliyin Velan on 7 August 2024, which gave a brief insight in Valli's background story. The second promo was unveiled on 28 August 2024, featuring Valli and Kadhirvelan and also revealing the upcoming release date. The serial was released on 2 September 2024, replacing Ninaithen Vandhai in its 7:30 PM slot on Zee Tamil.

== Adaptations ==
Language	Title	Original release	Network(s)	Last aired	Notes
Telugu	Ammayi Garu అమ్మాయి గారూ	31 October 2022	Zee Telugu	19 December 2026	Original
Kannada	Shravani Subramanya ಶ್ರಾವಣಿ ಸುಬ್ರಹ್ಮಣ್ಯ	18 March 2024	Zee Kannada	4 September 2026	Remake
Tamil	Valliyin Velan வள்ளியின் வேலன்	2 September 2024	Zee Tamil	25 May 2025	Remake
Malayalam	Akale അകലെ	25 November 2024	Zee Keralam	Ongoing	Remake
Marathi	Shubh Shravani शुभ श्रावणी	19 January 2026	Zee Marathi	19 September 2026	Remake
Bengali	Saat Paake Bandha সাত পাকে বাঁধা	19 March 2026	Zee Bangla	Ongoing	Remake
Hindi	Dilo Ki Ram Leela दिलों की राम लीला	24 August 2026	Zee TV	Ongoing	Remake
