= Chithi (TV series) =

Indian Tamil-language Television Serial

- Genre: Drama
- Screenplay by: Raj Prabhu; Kavibharathy; Dialogue: Raj Prabhu; Kavibharathy
- Story by: C. J. Baskar
- Directed by: C. J. Baskar
- Starring: Radhika Sarathkumar; Sivakumar
- Theme music composer: Dhina
- Opening theme: "Kanninmani Kanninmani"; Nithyasree Mahadevan (Vocal); Vairamuthu (Lyrics)
- Country of origin: India
- Original language: Tamil
- No. of seasons: 2
- No. of episodes: 467

Production
- Cinematography: Sakthi Saravanan
- Running time: approx. 20-22 minutes per episode
- Production company: Radaan Mediaworks

Original release
- Network: Sun TV
- Release: 20 December 1999 – 1 November 2001

Related
- Chithi 2

Chithi is an Indian Tamil prime time soap opera that aired on Sun TV. The show premiered on 20 December 1999 and ended on 1 November 2001. It aired Monday through Friday at 9:30pm. The serial stars Radhika Sarathkumar in dual roles, with Sivakumar.

The show was produced by Radaan Mediaworks, directed by C. J. Baskar. The title track was composed by Dhina. It was also aired in Sri Lanka Tamil Channel on Shakthi TV and United Kingdom Tamil Channel on Deepam TV. The show started reairing from 6 April 2020 to 26 June 2021 in Sun TV. It was dubbed into Telugu as Pinni and aired on Gemini TV. The show started reairing from 2 October 2025 on Thanthi One.

A reboot version of the series titled Chithi 2 premiered from January 27, 2020, on Sun TV starring Radikaa Sarathkumar and Preethi Sharma.

== Plot ==
Chithi is a serial based on women empowerment and the challenges faced by women in India. A Brahmin society in Srirangam, Trichy, Ramachandran, lives with his seven-year-old daughter Kaveri and a mentally challenged wife Vaidhegi. He has a best friend, Krishna, son of a box factory watchman. On the night of Karthigai Deepam, Vaidhegi drowns in a river, and following, a woman is running and a few men chasing her with firesticks. They set her saree aflame, and she jumps into the river. Vaidhegi is presumed dead and Kaveri longs for a mother's love. She waits for chithi (step-mum/aunt). Soon, she rescues the woman with the help of Krishna and Ramu. She starts calling her chithi, which creates chaos among the society people. The woman does not talk, but Kaveri clings to her. Ramu gets irritated and in the end, to prove his stand, he had no other choice but to accept the woman. The woman talks for the first time and reveals her name to be Sharadha. Krishna's father passes away, then Ramu and Krishna go to Madras searching for a job.

In Madras, they go to a textile store which is owned by Mahalingam. They buy clothes linings and materials worth about 10 Lacs and ask Mahalingam to loan it to them to which he disagrees. Distraught, they wander around the shop and bumps into Prabhavathi, the daughter of Mahalingam. She convinces her father to loan to them, and he agrees. Prabha falls for Ramu and helps both of them in all the ways she can, together with her cousin Velumani. This right side of Prabha has a qualified team, which shows that being the only daughter of a rich man, she would get anything she wants. If she does not get it, no one should get it. This behaviour of Prabha starts at a higher height when she falls in love with Ramu.

When Ramu and Krishna become successful in business, Prabha comes forward to reveal her love to Ramu, but he said he has Sharadha waiting for him at Agraharam. She becomes sad and plans to take revenge over Ramu.

Mahalingam and Padma fix a groom for Prabhavathi from the US, just because she forced Krishna to marry her. Velumani and Prabha make Krishna drink more, and makes him marry her at no other choice. Once Ramu marries Sharadha, he brings her and Kaveri to Chennai and later found Krishna being married. As Ramu said he could not leave Krishna in his life, he brings Krishna, Prabha and Velumani to the same house where he stays for rent.

The owner of the house is Janaki (Mahalingam's first love) and her two daughters. Mahalingam was forced to marry the Padma but secretly lives with Janaki with whom he gave birth to two daughters Viji and Geetha. As days pass, both Sharadha and Prabhavathi become pregnant. Prabhavathi makes Kaveri turn towards her to take revenge on her father and stepmother. Soon Kaveri leaves hostel and Sharadha starts a textile industry named Kavery Garments and builds a new house which she calls as Sharadha Illam.

They also bring Krishna's family to that house, including Velumani. Meanwhile, at Janaki's side, Viji loves a shed mechanic Surya, but Janaki reluctant to get her daughter married to a mechanic, makes Viji marry her own uncle's (Janaki's brother) son named Anand, where she faces torture from him.

Sharadha and Prabhavathi are admitted in the same hospital at the same time, and both simultaneously deliver sons. Ramu and Krishna fear these children will cause division between them, exchange the babies. Ramu names Krishna's son as Srinivasan and Krishna name Ramu's son as Prasad. Years pass, Sharadha business Kaveri Garments grows with profit, and she delivers two more kids, daughter Swetha and son Sreevatsan. Meanwhile, Prabhavathi and Krishna have another child, a daughter named Brindha. Since then all five kids grow up in the same house, like brothers and sisters. Srinivasan was found to be physically challenged as Prabha has taken a tablet to try to abort him, but Krishna is happy that the child is with Sharadha who loves him. She starts to love Srinivasan more than her other two children.

Kaveri, who went to the hostel as a child, return home as a teen. Initially, she was against her chithi by insulting her. Velumani and Prabha make Kaveri fall in love with a womaniser and drug smuggler named Nagu, without knowing his true colours, Kaveri loves him. Soon she starts to elope with him but before that she apologises to her step mom. She even used to insult Srinivas for being a lame person. On the day of fleeing on her 19th birthday, she found Nagu's true colours and both get remanded in a police station, Sharadha comes and saves her and hides the truth from her family. She starts to love her chithi more and realises her mistake, and soon shraddha starts to find a groom for her with Ramu and Krishna. Angered by Velu and Prabha, they try to stop Kaveri wedding by several attempts.

They hire Yogi as General Manager for Kaveri Garments, who kept on following Sharadha since her arrival to Srirangam, as few flash scenes were showing Sharadha and Yogi were working together and are relatives. But she does not want to bring her past and dedicates her complete life to Kaveri and Ramu. However, still, they make Yogi stay in their home, as he was a successful Manager for Kaveri Garments and Architect for Sharadha Illam as none knew about the past. Kaveri wedding gets fixed and got stopped as Ramu hid the truth to grooms parents that Sharadha belongs to different caste, as Vaidehi's mother exposed it. She did not like Ramu marrying different caste girl. To make Kaveri come out of it, Ramu and Sharadha do her work at Kaveri Garments. Meanwhile, Viji who faced torture under Anand and his family runs from their home and seeks Sharadha's house for shelter. Even she joins the same department of Kaveri at Kaveri Garments, and both enjoy working there.

Soon Sharadha finds a groom for Kaveri, from a lower-middle-class family. She gifts a house to them, and he works part-time at Temple, then in a computer training centre and evening as hotel supervisor to support his family. His name is Madhavan, who belongs to the same caste as Ramu. Wedding gets fixed, and Madhavan parents are excellent Sharadha being from a different caste. Things go smoothly, and Ramu learns that Vaidhegi is alive, he asks many times to go to his home, but she refused as he lived half of his life with Sharadha, but he secretly lives with her, and only Krishna come to know about it. One day Sharadha and Yogi spots Ramu giving flowers to a woman in a car and arguments arrives between them, an angered Yogi tells who Sharadha is.

Story shifts to flashback to Thirunelveli, where Sharadha is found to be IAS Collector of Thiruvnelveli, she has a twin sister named Sakthi Eshwar who is AC. Their father Eashwaran Pandiyan is a business tycoon and big don of the city which has fume with MLA Viswanathan. Yogi's mother's brother is Eshwara Pandi, as Yogi lost his mom as a toddler, he grew at Eashwaran house. Sakthi was his love interest. Eashwaran Pandian is not fond of Sharadha and favours Shakti over her.

Nevertheless, Sharadha and Shakti are close to each other. There comes a problem and unknowingly Eswara Pandian is a part of it. Amidst this, Sharada and Shakti's mother dies in a bomb blast, and Sharadha fights with her father. She even says that he would be punished. Angered, MLA Viswanathan and Eswara Pandian plot against Sharadha. Shakti suspecting this takes the form of her sister's avatar as Sharadha IAS and goes with Yogi. When they reach a temple, MLA and Eswaran, mistaking Shakti for Sharadha, kills her. Sharadha devastated, argues with her father, who realises his mistake. The MLA, on the other hand, orders his men to kill Sharadha. Eswaran Pandian and Yogi fail to save Sharadha, and Eswaran are arrested. Sharadha runs for her life and jumps into the water, and the little Kaveri saves her life in Kavery River, at Srirangam, which happened at the beginning of the show.

Yogi completes telling the story to Ramu and the rest and Sharadha's secret is out. And Vaidheghi's existence is revealed to Sharadha by Krishna and they bring her with Sharadha's approval. Meanwhile, Kaveri gets pregnant while at the same time, Nagu is out of jail to avenge Kaveri. (Madhavan knows about Nagu and Kaveri). Viji faces problems at the factory due to her past life with Anand and Sharadha gets her married to Yogi. Angered and insulted, Anand comes to throw acid at Viji's face but gets involved in an accident. He apologises to Viji before dying, and Anand's chapter is over. Nagu tries very hard to avenge Kaveri. Kaveri is admitted to the hospital at night, and Nagu goes there, which results in Kaveri's miscarriage. Kaveri's mother-in-law starts hating her for hiding the truth about Nagu. Suddenly, Krishna who has gotten liver cancer by his drinking habit last time, But he is mysteriously killed by a group. Prabhavathi poisons Prasad's mind that Ramu and Sharadha are the reason Krishna died. Prasad curses them before leaving Sharadha Illam with his family and Velu. Ramu is left heartbroken with the death of his best friend and rift between his family and Krishna's family. Viji gets pregnant but slips and falls and goes into labour. She dies of injuries but gives birth to a healthy baby girl whom Yogi names Sakthi.

The year rolls by, and all the kids are grown up. Kavery is left childless even after consulting many doctors and gains more of her mother-in-law's wrath. Madhavan keeps on supporting her. Srinivas, who is bounded to crutches, becomes a journalist and writer. Shakti is seen to have a feeling for Srinivasan. Shweta becomes a teacher at a school while Srivatsan becomes a doctor. Prasad an engineer and Brindha start training as for IPS. Now Vaidhegi and her mother are staying with Sharadha in a rented house, but act against Sharadha by indirectly helping Prabha. Sharadha Islam is undergoing a court case after Prabha files the fact that she too has a share in it. Things start to heat up when the children fall in love, and Eswaran gets released. Shakti's crush on Srinivas starts to bother Ramu as technically, Srinivas and Shakti are brother and sister as their biological mothers, Prabha and Viji are half-sisters. But Srinivas starts to fall for a fan of him, Kamini. Brindha and her fellow IPS friend, Shreedar form a mutual friendship, but Shreedar falls for Brindha. Prasad's friend, Daniel, eventually marries Brindha and Prasad gets committed with a girl called Charulatha. Srivatsan marries his doctor friend Sangeetha and stays in her house. What Shweta does comes as a shock to the whole family. At the day of her wedding, Shweta runs away with a useless, poor slum guy called Kannan. Ramu leaves home after this and stays in an Ashramam. It is Prasad, who arranged Kannan through Daniel to torture Sharadha using her daughter, Shweta. But he did not expect Shweta to fall for Kannan. Under some circumstances, Sharadha and the family move to the Janaki's house like before, Vaidhegi chases her mother out and goes a change of heart. Kavery Garment starts to fall apart, and Sharadha stumbles. Eswaran comes and stays with the family. Padmavathy angrily goes to Prabha and tells the truth about her son. It was shown that Krishna told Padmavathy the truth before he died. Later, Padmavathy dies in a car accident and Mahalingam also died out of shock. Prabha comes to meet Ramu in the ashram and learns the truth. She is left heartbroken as she loves Prasad a lot.

Kaveri stays with Sharadha and her mother-in-law falls sick. Madhavan comes to bring her back but Kaveri disagrees much to Madhavan's anger. But things changes and Madhavan's mother accepts Kaveri with a full heart. Shweta lives a hard and troubled lifestyle. Later, Kanan changes his heart and start a business through the indirect help of Sharadha. But Shwetha starts to demand from Sharadha. Shweta scolds her saying that she always preferred Kaveri over her children, causing Sharadha to get angrier on her and chase her out of Kavery Garments. Ramu returns after some time. Meanwhile, murders take place and it surrounds Prabha and Sharadha's families. Eswaran also dies after fighting with some old rivals in Prabha's residence. Shreedar starts to investigate the case with Brindha and they suspect Prabha to be responsible. Prabha is having a dilemma to choose between Prasad or Srinivas. Her slight affection towards her biological son, Srinivas, anger and upsets Prasad. Velu Mani finds the relevant document of Sharadha being Prasad's birth mother and is shocked. Heart-broken in thinking that Prasad is not his real nephew at first, he changes and demands 5 crores from Prabha to hide the truth. Prabha, scared and helpless, kills Velu also. Everyone is shocked about this. Shakti kills herself after discovering from Prabha that Srinivas, the man she loved is her cousin. The whole family is shattered. Sharadha illam case is solved and Sharadha gets back her home. Srinivas goes to meet Prabha and learns that Shakti went there before killing herself after Prasad accidentally blurts it out. Srinivas fights with Prabha and Prasad accidentally pushes him against a wall, injuring his head. Prabha angered at Prasad argues with him and he leaves home devastated.

Sharadha learns of Srinivas's injury and is angered, goes to kill Prasad and Prabha. Ramu stops her and tells her the truth that Prasad is her real son. Sharadha cries learning the truth. Meanwhile, Yogi learns the truth about the original sons of Sharadha and Prabha from the suicidal letter of Sakthi. Srinivas comes home and Sharadha breaks down in front of him. They get a call and learn that Prabha had locked herself in a room and wants to speak to Sharadha. They go to Prabha's house and Prabha begs Sharadha to not take Prasad away from her. Sharadha, realizing Prabha's true love for Prasad, promises her that she would not tell anyone the truth and that Prasad is her son. Prabha, thankful, surrenders to the police. Sharadha has to take care of both Prasad and Srinivas.

Several days later, Yogi brings photograph crew to the Sharadha Illam to take a family photo. To their shock, the crew looks exactly like the dead Eswaran, Velu Mani and much to Ramu's shock, Krishna. But they are not their men. While taking the photograph, Kaveri declares she is pregnant. A few years later, Prabha is released and the whole family with their children pose for the final family photograph.

== Cast ==
=== Main ===
- Radhika Sarathkumar in a dual role as:
  - Sharadha Ramachandran – Owner of Kaveri Garments; Eeswarapaandian and Rajeshwari's elder daughter; Sakthi's twin sister; Yogi's cousin; Ramu's second wife; Kaveri's stepmother; Prasad, Shwetha and Shree’s mother; Srinivasan's adoptive mother
  - Sakthi – Eeswarapaandian and Rajeshwari's younger daughter; Sharadha's twin sister; Yogi's cousin and ex-fiancée (Dead)
- Sivakumar as Ramachandran (Ramu)– Krishna's best friend; Sharadha and Vaidhegi’s husband; Kaveri, Prasad, Shwetha and Shree's father; Srinivasan's adoptive father

=== Recurring ===
- Subhalekha Sudhakar as Krishna – Ramu's best friend; Prabhavati's husband; Srinivasan's and Brinda's father; Prasad's adoptive father (Dead)
- Yuvarani as Prabhavathi (Prabha) – Mahalingam's and Padmavati's daughter; Janaki's step-daughter; Viji's and Geetha's half-sister; Velu's cousin; Krishna's widow; Srinivasan's and Brindha's mother; Prasad's adoptive mother
- Deepa Venkat / Bhavana as Viji – Mahalingam's and Janaki's daughter; Padmavati's step-daughter; Geetha's sister; Prabhavati's half-sister; Anand's ex-wife; Yogi's wife; Jr. Sakthi's mother (Dead)
- Ajay Rathnam as Yogi – Eeswarapaandian and Rajeshwari's nephew; Sharadha's and Sakthi's cousin; Viji's widower; Jr. Sakthi's father
- Neena as Kaveri – Vaidhegi's and Ramu's daughter; Sharadha's step-daughter; Prasad, Shwetha and Shree's half-sister; Srinivasan's adopted half-sister; Nagu's ex-fiancée; Madhavan's wife
  - Hemalatha as Child Kaveri
- Vijay Adhiraj as Prasad – An Engineer; Sharadha and Ramu's eldest son; Shwetha and Shree's brother; Kaveri's half-brother; Krishna and Prabhavathi's adopted son; Srinivasan and Brindha's adopted brother; Charulatha's love interest
- Tharika as Shwetha – A Teacher; Sharadha and Ramu's daughter; Prasad and Shree's sister; Kaveri's half-sister; Srinivasan's adopted sister; Kannan's wife
- Dev Anand Sharma as Shreevatsan aka Shree – A Doctor; Sharadha and Ramu's younger son; Prasad and Shwetha's brother; Kaveri's half-brother; Srinivasan's adopted brother; Sangeetha's husband
- Sashikumar Subramani as Srinivasan aka Seenu / Cheenu – A journalist and writer; Prabhavathi and Krishna's son; Brindha's brother; Sharadha and Ramu's adopted son; Prasad, Shwetha and Shree's adopted brother; Kaveri's adopted half-brother
- Shilpa Mary Teresa as Brindha – A Police Officer; Prabhavathi and Krishna's daughter; Srinivasan's sister; Prasad's adopted sister; Daniel's wife
- Karpagam as Jr. Sakthi – Viji and Yogi's daughter; Srinivasan's cousin and one-sided lover (Dead)
- Sureshwar as Madhavan – Kaveri's husband
- Vinodhini as Charulatha aka Charu – Prasad's lover turned wife
- Vijay Sarathy as Kannan – Shwetha's husband
- Bhuvaneswari as Sangeetha – A Doctor; Gayathri's daughter; Shree's friend turned wife
- Seetha Anil as Kamini - Srinivasan's lover turned wife
- T. C. Balaji as Daniel - Brindha's husband
- Anju as Vaidhegi – Ambujam's daughter; Ramu's ex-wife; Kaveri's mother
- Delhi Kumar as Mahalingam – Janaki and Padmavati's husband; Prabhavathi, Viji and Geetha's father; Srinivasan, Brindha and Jr. Sakthi's grandfather; Prasad's adoptive grandfather (Dead)
- Janavi as Janaki – Mahalingam's first wife; Viji and Geetha's mother; Prabhavati's step-mother; Jr. Sakthi's grandmother
- Shanthi Williams as Padmavathi aka Padma – Mahalingam's second wife; Prabhavathi's mother; Viji and Geetha's step-mother; Srinivasan and Brindha's grandmother; Prasad's adoptive grandmother (Dead)
- Bhuvana as Geetha – Mahalingam and Janaki's younger daughter; Padmavati's step-daughter; Viji's sister; Prabhavati's half-sister; Shiva's wife
- Charukesh as Shiva – Geetha's husband
- Vasu Vikram as Velumani aka Velu – Prabhavathi's cousin and sidekick; Roja's husband (Dead)
- D. Priyanka as Roja – Sharadha's maid; Velu's wife
- Vatsala Rajagopal as Ambujam – Vaidhegi's mother; Kaveri's grandmother
- Ravikumar as Eeswarapaandian aka Eshwaran – A business tycoon; Rajeshwari's widower; Sharadha and Sakthi's father; Yogi's uncle
- Latha as Rajeshwari – Eeswarapaandian's wife; Sharadha and Sakthi's mother; Yogi's aunt (Dead)
- Vincent Roy as Vishwanathan MLA – Eshwaran's former friend; Sharadha's enemy; Sakthi's murderer
- Rohit as Suriya – Viji's former lover
- Vasuki as Sundari
- Junior Balaiah as James; Jennifer's husband and Daniel's father
- Viji Kannan as Jennifer; James wife and Daniel's mother
- Charuhasan as Ramu's mate in ashram
- Ramamani Monalisa as Ramu's mate in ashram
- Riyaz Khan as Anand; Viji's ex-husband
- Nandhakumar as Anand's house owner
- Kuyili as Gauthami
- K. S. Jayalakshmi as Anand's mother
- Poovilangu Mohan as Marudhappan; Charulatha's father
- Pasi Sathya as Kannan's mother
- Vishwa as Nagu (Srikumar), Kaveri's former lover
- V. K. Ramasamy as Ramasamy
- Kavi as Mallika (Sharadha's maid and Subbaiah's wife)
- Kumaresan as Subbaiah (Saratha's servant and Mallika's husband)
- Akash as Sreedhar
- Bombay Gnanam as Sreedhar's mother
- Mali as Kannan's brother
- R. N. K. Prasad as D. V. Reddy
- Vizhuthugal Santhanam as Prabhavathi's lawyer/judge
- A. Thamizh Kumaran as V. Thamizh Kumaran
- Mohan Raman as Prabhavathi's lawyer
- Sangeetha Balan as Thamizharasan's wife
- Geethalakshmi as Nagu's assistant
- Isaac Varghese as Dandapani (Isaac Sekhar)
- Srilekha Rajendran as Kamini's mother
- Sheik Mohammed (Raj Madan) as Sangeetha's father
- Gowthami Vembunathan as Gayathri, Sangeetha's mother
- Vijayaraj as a collector office staff
- Rathnaraj as an undercover police officer
- Padmini as a police inspector
- Lollu Sabha Palani as Kaveri Garments staff
- Sampath Ram as a police inspector
- Devaraj as Prakash
- Vijay Anand as Saradha's former colleague
- Padayappa Ramesh as a police inspector
- K. Krishnamurthy as Mahalingam' lawyer
- D. Srinivasan (Manager Cheena Srinivasan) as Prasad's auditor
- Sregajesh as a bus passenger
- R. Krishnamachary as Sarangan
- R. Murugan (Yuvanraj Nethran) as Venkateshan
- Meesai Murugesan as Narasimman's father
- Adade Manohar as Parthasarathy
- Valli Suresh as Mythili
- Sumangali as Sumangali
- Soumyanarayanan as Narasimman/police inspector
- Chelladurai as a marriage broker
- Siva Narayana Murthy as Chakradevan
- Kaladhar Parthasarathy as a foreman
- Iyyappan Kobee (Ala Kasi Viswanathan) as Muthukkalai, Viswanathan's aide
- Vasantha as a spectator in the court
- Jayasurya as Eashwarapandiyan's henchman
- Sampathkumaran Sridharan as a temple priest
- Lollu Sabha Swaminathan as the temple priest's accountant
- Srividya as a girl affected by the paint factory pollution
- Sudhangan as himself
- Muthulingam in a special appearance as himself
- Mathiazhagan (Arivumathi) in a special appearance as himself

== Production ==
=== Filming ===
The series was filmed in Chennai, Kallidaikurichi, Tenkasi, Srirangam, and Kumbakonam in India.

== Soundtrack ==
The title song and the background score was composed by the music director Dhina lyrics written by Vairamuthu.

Track listing
No.	Title	Lyrics	Singer(s)	Length
1.	"Kanninmani Kanninmani கண்ணின்மணி கண்ணின்மணி"	Vairamuthu	Nithyasree Mahadevan	3:07
2.	"Vaanathai Nokki வானத்தை நோக்கி"	Virutchamuni	S. P. Balasubrahmanyam	4:54

== Adaptations ==
Language	Title	Original release	Network(s)	Last aired	Notes
Tamil	Chithi	20 December 1999	Sun TV	1 November 2001	Original
Malayalam	Parvathi	14 August 2000	Surya TV	20 October 2000	Remake
Hindi	Chhoti Maa...Ek Anokha Bandhan	3 August 2001	Zee TV	16 May 2002	Remake
Odia	Mausi	2001	ETV Odia	2002	Remake
Kannada	Chikkamma	2010	Udaya TV	2011	Remake

== Reception ==
Chithi became one of the most watched Indian soap opera and most watched Tamil program at that time. In week 26 of 2000, it was one of the most watched Indian serial with 4.67 TVR. Overall in 2000, it was the seventeenth most watched Indian television program with 4.45 TVR. From 30 April 2001 to 6 May 2001 and the following week it was at fourth position in All TV homes ratings with 4.7 TVR. On 3 October 2001, it garnered 5.55 TVR.
