= Sukirti Kandpal =

Indian actress and model

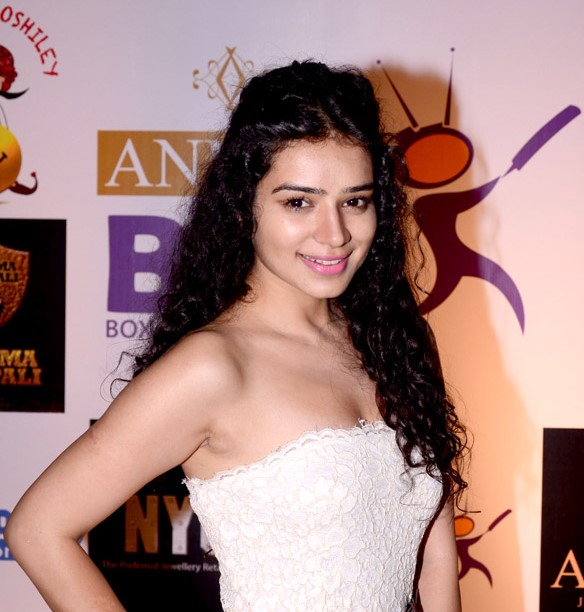
- Kandpal in 2016
- Born: 1987 or 1988 (age 38–39); Nainital, Uttarakhand, India
- Education: Economics Honours from Sophia College for Women, Mumbai
- Occupations: Actress; model
- Years active: 2007–present
- Known for: Dill Mill Gayye; Pyaar Kii Ye Ek Kahaani; Story 9 Months Ki; Dilli Wali Thakur Gurls
- Title: Miss India Worldwide India 2011; Miss Bollywood Diva

Sukirti Kandpal is an Indian actress and model who appears in Hindi television. She established herself as one of the leading actresses of Indian Television from the late 2000s through the early 2010s. Recognised for her comic timing and vivacious on-screen persona, she is the recipient of several accolades, in addition to two Indian Television Academy Awards nominations.

She marked her acting debut with the youth show Jersey No 10. Kandpal got recognition after portraying the leading roles of Dr. Riddhima Gupta in Dill Mill Gayye and Piya Dobriyal in romantic thriller Pyaar Kii Ye Ek Kahaani. In 2014, she participated in Bigg Boss 8 and finished in 19th place.

Her other notable works include portraying Simran Khanna in Kaisa Yeh Ishq Hai... Ajab Sa Risk Hai and Debjani Thakur in Dilli Wali Thakur Gurls and as business woman Alia Shroff in Story 9 Months Ki. After a hiatus of two years she made a comeback on television with the character of freedom fighter Pritilata Waddedar in Swaraj(2023). In the same year, she was seen portraying Shruti Ahuja in the popular show Anupamaa. She made her debut on web with ZEE5 original Hostel Haadsa: Bhoot ya Bhram. She is currently seen as portraying the lead character Priyal Basu in mystery-horror supernatural-thriller series.

== Life and education ==
Kandpal was born in Nainital, Uttarakhand, to B.D. Kandpal (former President of the Uttarakhand Bar Association, Deputy Advocate General of Uttarakhand High Court) and Manju Kandpal. She has two siblings an elder sister, Bhavna Kandpal, and a younger brother, Manjul Kandpal. She attended St. Mary's Convent High School, Nainital.

Kandpal originally wanted to pursue law as her father was a public prosecutor. She received an honors degree in Economics from Sophia College for Women, Mumbai. She dated Manavendra Singh Shekhawat during the early years of her career but split afterwards.

== Career ==
=== 2007–2009: Start of a career and Dill Mill Gayye ===
Kandpal started her television career in 2007 with Jersey No. 10, an Indian adaptation of the American series One Tree Hill on Sab TV, which was first sports-based show on Indian television and one of the most popular shows on TV in 2008. A creative director from Cinevistaas Limited spotted her at a coffee shop and asked her to meet him later for an audition. In the same year, she also appeared in the various episodics of Indian horror thriller television anthology series Ssshhhh...Phir Koi Hai on Star One.

In 2008, she replaced Shilpa Anand as Dr. Riddhima Gupta in medical romantic comedy show Dill Mill Gayye. She worked there for ten months and quit in 2009.

In 2009, she appeared in the official music video of the song "Teri Yaad Mein" from the album Chaandan Mein by Kailash Kher.

=== 2010–2015: Breakthrough in Pyaar Kii Ye Ek Kahaani and Bigg Boss ===
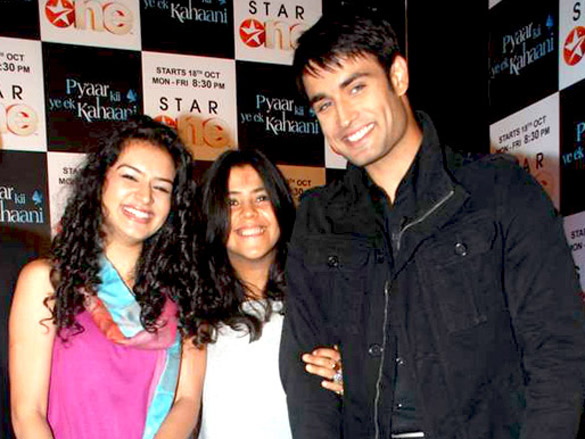
Sukirti Kandpal Ekta Kapoor and Vivian Dsena at the launch of Star One's Pyaar Kii Ye Ek Kahaani

In 2010, she appeared as Siddheshwari Singh in Agle Janam Mohe Bitiya Hi Kijo. In June 2010, she participated in Imagine TV's reality show Meethi Choori No 1. Later in October 2010, she played a double role in Balaji Telefilms' supernatural romance Pyaar Kii Ye Ek Kahaani as Piya Dobriyal and as Princess Maithili. The show was the first youth centric supernatural series in India, inspired by The Vampire Diaries and Twilight Saga. The show aired its last episode on 15 December 2011 and established her fame and recognition. In the same year, she participated in another reality show for Imagine TV, Nachle Ve with Saroj Khan.

Kandpal took a break before returning to acting in 2012 as NRI Jazz in Rab Se Sona Ishq in 2012. She appeared as four characters with same face in Life OK's series Mystery of clones as a part of Hum Ne Li Hai...Shapath and later returned for another episode as a part of team of criminals who escape from prison to take revenge on Shapath team. She co-hosted a special episode based on the harassment of girls in the crime based television series Gumrah: End of Innocence on Channel V, and later made an appearance on the same show as a college girl in an episode based on the consequences of an open relationship.

In 2013, she starred in Kaisa Ye Ishq Hai..ajab sa risk hai on Life OK as lead. In 2014, she participated in the reality show Bigg Boss 8 where she survived for two weeks until she got evicted on day 14.

In 2015, she played a journalist, Debjani Thakur, in &TV's Dilli Wali Thakur Gurls, which was a TV adaptation of Anuja Chauhan's novel Those Pricey Thakur Gurls.

=== 2016–present: Kaala Teeka and further success with Story 9 Months Ki ===
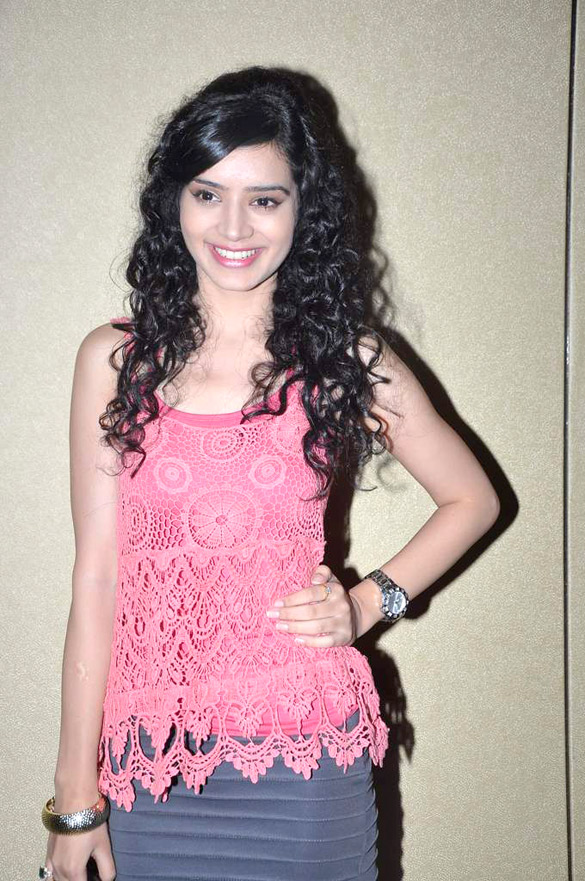
Kandpal at launch of Rab Se Sona Ishq

In early 2016, opposite Gaurav Khanna, Kandpal appeared as a lead in the episode "Grahan" of &TV's horror fiction show Darr Sabko Lagta Hai. She next played the character of a Haryanvi girl Rajjo in Zee TV's Tashan-E-Ishq.

She was a celebrity host for the travel-centered web series Desi Explorers also featuring in two sub series of Desi Explorers: Desi Explorers Jordan and Desi Explorers Taiwan. In 2017, she returned to fictional TV series in season 2 of Zee TV's Kaala Teeka as Naina Yug Choudhary. After this, she decided to have some time off to spend with her family. In July 2019, after a hiatus of two years, she appeared as Saundarya in a five part special crime thriller titled "Chausar" as a part of Savdhaan India special crime series on Star Bharat.

In November 2020, she made a comeback as a lead character of a successful businesswoman Aliya Shroff in Story 9 Months Ki on Sony Entertainment Television. Story 9 Months Ki is the first-ever show based on choice motherhood through In vitro fertilization on Indian television and explores the journey of a successful single woman towards motherhood on her own terms. The show was called "one of the most pathbreaking shows of the year 2021" by Urban Asian. Her character Aliya Shroff was included among a list of Strong female characters on Indian television and web series by The Times of India.

In 2023, she made a comeback to the acting after a hiatus of nearly two years with DD National's Swaraj, a Docudrama series based on the tales of courage of more than 550 Indian freedom fighters and inspired from the Azadi Ka Amrit Mahotsav national campaign of the Prime Minister, Shri Narendra Modi, portraying the character of Bengal's first woman martyr Pritilata Waddedar. In March 2024, Swaraj was released on OTT platform Amazon Prime Video by Union Minister for Information and Broadcasting, Shri Anurag Singh Thakur.

Since December 2023, she is portraying Shruti Ahuja opposite Gaurav Khanna, a photographer in StarPlus's Anupamaa.

== Other work and media image ==
In 2016, she was associated with the "Sarvodaya Women Empowerment" initiative by Nainital police in her home state of Uttarakhand. In 2020, she was associated with "Main Darpok Hoon", an awareness campaign by Hamdard India which was aimed at encouraging people to stay indoors and take preventive measures to stay healthy and safe during the COVID-19 pandemic. In 2021, she received MEGA Achievers Award by Make Earth Green Again (MEGA) foundation for her work for animal welfare.

In a Hindustan Times poll on "The Next Big Thing: Television actors" (2011), she was chosen by senior actor Varun Badola as the one who "has the potential to make it big" alongside Ragini Khanna and Ankita Lokhande. She received the Aadhi Aabadi Women Achievers Award in 2013 for outstanding contributions in her field. She was included in Eastern Eye's list of the top 50 sexiest Asian women in 2014, 2015, 2016 and 2017. An Indian lifestyle website for men, MensXP.com, listed her among the "35 Hottest Actresses In Indian Television" and also included her among the most desired actresses of Indian Television among teens from 2000s. In 2016, MissMalini.com listed her among the "28 Sexiest Hindi Television Actresses".

She was ranked 20th Television Personality in a 2015 poll by Sabras Radio for her show Dilli Wali Thakur Gurls. She has been a regular face of the annual Telly Calendar, featuring popular Indian television actresses by Marinating Films and Balaji Telefilms, and was part of all six of its editions up to 2017. She was featured in the list of 2021's Top 50 Women of Indian Television by a South Asian entertainment website Urban Asian for her performance in Story 9 Months Ki.

== Beauty pageants ==
Kandpal represented India (as Miss India Worldwide India) in the 2011 Miss India Worldwide contest held in Dubai, won the title Miss Bollywood Diva, and was one of the top ten contenders among the participants spanning over 30 countries. She was a judge for the Mrs. India Dubai International Beauty Pageant in 2016, alongside Dia Mirza and Mr and Miss Delhi India in 2017, alongside Aditi Govitrikar and Shahnaz Hussain.

== Filmography ==
=== Films ===
Year	Film	Notes
2013	Koi Kuch Karta Kyun Nahin	Short film

=== Television ===
Year	Show	Role	Notes	Ref.
2007	Jersey No. 10	Sakshi	TV debut	
2008	Ssshhhh...Phir Koi Hai	Rinky / Sumi		
2008–2009	Dill Mill Gayye	Dr. Riddhima Gupta	Lead role	
2009–2010	Agle Janam Mohe Bitiya Hi Kijo	Siddheshwari Singh	Antagonist	
2010	Meethi Choori No 1	Contestant		
2010	Comedy Circus	Contestant		
2010–2011	Pyaar Kii Ye Ek Kahaani	Piya Dobriyal & Princess Gayatrisinghi Shivranjini Maithali Gaurima Pandher	Dual role	
2011	Nachle Ve with Saroj Khan	Contestant		
2012	Rab Se Sohna Isshq	Jasbeer "Jazz" Pal	Antagonist	
2012	Hum Ne Li Hai...Shapath	Monisha, Leena, Sonia & Bindiya (Multiple clones)		
2012	Gumrah: End of Innocence	Tanvi	Lead role	
2013–2014	Kaisa Yeh Ishq Hai... Ajab Sa Risk Hai	Simran "Simmi" Khanna	Lead role	
2014	Bigg Boss 8	Contestant	24th place	
2014–2015	Box Cricket League 1	Contestant	Player for Team Rowdy Bangalore	
2015	Killerr Karaoke Atka Toh Latkah	Contestant		
2015	Dilli Wali Thakur Girls	Debjani Thakur	Lead role	
2016	Darr Sabko Lagta Hai	Rashmi	Episode "Grahan"	
2016	Tashan-e-Ishq	Rajjo	Cameo appearance	
2017	Kaala Teeka	Naina Choudhary	Lead role	
2019	Savdhaan India	Saundarya	Lead role	
2020–2021	Story 9 Months Ki	Aliya Shroff	Lead role	
2023	Swaraj	Pritilata Waddedar		
2023–2024	Anupamaa	Shruti Ahuja	Supporting role	

=== Special appearances ===
Year	Show	Role	Notes	Ref(s)
2009	Sa Re Ga Ma Pa L'il Champs	Herself	Guest	
2010	Geet – Hui Sabse Parayi	Guest (as Piya)	To promote Pyaar Kii Ye Ek Kahaani	
2010	Dhoondh Legi Manzil Humein	Guest (as Piya)	To promote Pyaar Kii Ye Ek Kahaani	
2010	Rang Badalti Odhani	Guest (as Piya)	To promote Pyaar Kii Ye Ek Kahaani	
2010	Yeh Ishq Haaye	Guest (as Piya)	To promote Pyaar Kii Ye Ek Kahaani	
2011	Koffee With Karan	Guest as Piya	(Season 3, Episode 10)	
2012	Punar Vivaah - Zindagi Milegi Dobara	Guest	Special Mahasangam episode for Zee TV 20 years celebration	
2013	Pavitra Rishta	Guest as Jazz	Special appearance in episode 956	
2013	Junoon – Aisi Nafrat Toh Kaisa Ishq	Guest (as Simran)	Dance performance	
2013	The Bachelorette India: Mere Khayaalon Ki Mallika	Guest (as Simran)	Guest presenter in the grand finale	
2021	India's Best Dancer	Guest	To promote Story 9 Months Ki	
2023	Hum Mahilayen Uttarakhand conclave	Guest/panelist		
2025	TOI Dialogues Uttarakhand	Guest/panelist	As a co-panelist on The Uttarakhand Story - From Screen to Success	

==== Web series ====
Year	Series	Role	Platform	Ref(s)
2026	Hostel Haadsa: Bhoot Ya Bhram	Priyal Basu	ZEE5	

==== Other appearances ====
Year	Show	Role	Ref(s)
2016	Desi Explorers Jordan	Host	
2016	Desi Explorers Taiwan	Host	
2020	NBT Star Homemakers	Herself as jury member	

==== Music videos ====
Year	Song	Album	Singer
2009	"Teri Yaad Mein"	Chaandan Mein	Kailash Kher

== Awards and nominations ==
Year	Award	Category	Work	Result	Ref
2010	Zee Rishtey Awards	‘’Favourite Saas-Bahu Rishta’’	Agle Janam Mohe Bitiya Hi Kijo	Won	Shared with Roopa Ganguly
2012	Zee Rishtey Awards	‘’Favourite Nayi Jodi’’	Rab Se Sohna Isshq	Nominated	Shared with Ashish Sharma
2017	Indian Television Academy Awards	Best Actress Popular	Kaala Teeka	Nominated	
2021	Indian Television Academy Awards	Best Actress in a Lead Role	Story 9 Months Ki	Nominated	
