= Iconic Gold Awards =

Annual Indian television awards

- Awarded for: Film and television
- Location: Mumbai, Maharashtra, India
- Country: India
- Hosted by: Karanvir Sharma & Ayushi Shekhawat (2025)
- First award: 2020
- Final award: present
- Website: iconicgoldawards.com

The Iconic Gold Awards is an annual awards show that honours the best performers in the Hindi films and Television industry.

The Iconic Gold Awards was founded in 2020 by Priya P. Jaiswal, and Piyush Jaiiswaal is the CEO. The event recognises achievements in acting, production, direction, and technical categories and best known for its red-carpet presence and celebrity participation the awards are streamed on ZEE5, reaching audiences across India and abroad.

== Popular Awards ==
=== Best Actor Film ===
Year	Actor	Show	Photo	Reference
2021	Not Awarded			
2022	Siddharth Malhotra	Shershaah		
2023	Anupam Kher	The Kashmir Files		
2024	Abhishek Bachchan	Ghoomer		
2025	Kartik Aaryan	Bhool Bhulaiyaa 3		

=== Best Actress Film ===
Year	Actor	Show	Photo	Reference
2021	Not Awarded			
2022	Kriti Sanon	Mimi		
2023	Huma Qureshi	Monica, O My Darling		
2024	Shraddha Kapoor	Tu Jhoothi Main Makkaar		
2025	Kriti Sanon	Teri Baaton Mein Aisa Uljha Jiya		

=== Best Actor Television ===
Year	Actor	Show	Photo	Reference
2021	Karanvir Sharma	Shaurya Aur Anokhi Ki Kahani		
2022	Dheeraj Dhoopar	Kundali Bhagya		
2023	Harshad Chopda	Yeh Rishta Kya Kehlata Hai		
2024	Mohit Malik	Baatein Kuch Ankahee Si		
2025	Dheeraj Dhoopar	Rabb Se Hai Dua		

=== Best Actress Television ===
Year	Actor	Show	Photo	Reference
2021	Shivangi Joshi	Yeh Rishta Kya Kehlata Hai		
2022	Shivangi Joshi	Yeh Rishta Kya Kehlata Hai		
2023	Rupali Ganguly	Anupamaa		
2024	Rupali Ganguly	Anupamaa		
2025	Pranali Rathod	Durga – Atoot Prem Kahani		

== Critics Awards ==
=== Best Actor Film ===
Year	Actor	Show	Photo	Reference
2024	Kartik Aaryan	Satyaprem Ki Katha		

=== Best Actress Film ===
Year	Actor	Show	Photo	Reference
2024	Adah Sharma	The Kerala Story		

=== Best Actress OTT ===
Year	Actor	Show	Photo	Reference
2023	Alia Bhatt	Darlings		
2024	Rakul Preet Singh	Chhatriwali		
2025	Kriti Sanon	Do Patti		
