= Chithi 2 =

Indian television series

- Genre: Soap opera
- Screenplay by: Sekizhar
- Story by: Sekizhar; Dialogues; Pa. Raghavan
- Directed by: Sundar K. Vijayan (Episodes 1-31); K. Sulaiman (Episode 32-580)
- Starring: Radhika Sarathkumar; Preethi Sharma; Nandan Loganathan
- Theme music composer: Dhina
- Opening theme: "Kanninmani"
- Composer: Clement
- Country of origin: India
- Original language: Tamil
- No. of seasons: 2
- No. of episodes: 580

Production
- Executive producer: R. Radikaa Sarathkumar
- Producer: Pooja Sarathkumar
- Camera setup: Multi-camera
- Running time: approx. 21-23 minutes
- Production companies: Radaan Mediaworks; Sun Entertainment

Original release
- Network: Sun TV
- Release: 27 January 2020 – 28 May 2022

Chithi 2 is an Indian Tamil-language soap opera which premiered on 27 January 2020 and ended on 28 May 2022 with 580 episodes on Sun TV. It is a reboot of the 1999 series Chithi. Produced by Radaan Mediaworks, it starred Radhika Sarathkumar with Preethi Sharma and Nandan Loganathan.

== Plot ==
Sharada is an honest teacher. She is married to Shanmugam under circumstances as his first wife, and Sharada's elder sister had run away with her lover. She even takes complete responsibility for Shanmugam and Padma's children Kalai and Anbu. Mallika, a rich lady who wished to marry Shanmugam is revealed to have helped in chasing away Padma and her lover. Sharada gives birth to a girl, and Mallika's brother Dharma and his wife Gowri too have a girl. Dharma's baby is seemingly stillborn and is taken to hospital and declared dead. A dejected Dharma takes his dead baby but sees Sharada's car in an accident and swaps his baby with hers. Sharada comes to consciousness and learns her child is stolen, and to everyone's surprise, Dharma's baby survives and Sharada raises her as her daughter and names her Venba. Sharada deals with various issues that trouble her family and keeps them closer. Nandini, Anbu's wife has an enmity with Sharada and Venba who had previously insulted her for a misunderstanding. Nandini learns about Venba's birth and breaks it open on her birthday. Venba feels shattered but gathers herself and considers the family hers. Kavin, a London MBA graduate, and Mallika's son returns to India to work for his company "Kavin Industries". Venba works as his secretary and he slowly falls in love with her. Mallika pressures him to marry Yazhini, her brother Dharma's daughter. However, Dharma soon learns that Venba is his real daughter after Sharada's relative Gomathinayagam reveals the truth about her birth. Kavin proposes to Venba who rejects him and suggests he marry Yazhini for betterment as Sharada and Mallika are at loggerheads because Mallika thinks that Sharada had exposed her illegal activities to the police when in fact it's Nandini who did it. Kavin who knows Venba loves him, secretly takes her to a temple and ties the sacred marriage chain as she is praying. A shocked Venba keeps this a secret and lies to Kavin that she has donated the gold chain he put on her. A saddened but determined Kavin tries to win her heart while his marriage preparations are going on with Yazhini. Soon Sharada learns that Yazhini is her real daughter and Venba is Dharma's daughter. She goes into a dilemma as Venba too confesses that she loves Kavin. She sends Venba away so Yazhini can get married in peace. Dharma learns about Kavin and Venba's marriage and goes to announce to his family that Venba is the real heir of the family but soon meets with an accident and lands in a coma. After a series of events, it is revealed that Kavin and Venba are already married, and Venba faces the wrath of her family. They soon accept the truth and get Kavin and Venba legally married. Sharada shifts to Singapore with her family to continue her services as a teacher there.

Venba shifts to Kavin's place and faces hurdles and hatred of Mallika, Gowri, and Yazhini while Dharma cries in the silence seeing his daughter suffer. Despite all hurdles, Kavin stands as a huge support for Venba. Venba soon wins over Gowri who considers her like her daughter and supports her. Mallika creates a ruckus and tells Kavin to pay 1 crore for bringing him up. Kavin moves out with Venba and faces a lot of hurdles but leads a simpler and happier life. Yazhini and Mallika try to stop their growth but go futile. Kavin and Venba take over Natarajan and Subbulakshmi's almost bankrupt company and bring them to a stable position. Kavin is shocked to learn that Venba is Dharma’s real daughter and that Yazhini is Sharada's daughter but is stopped by Dharma from revealing the truth to Venba. Mallika is diagnosed with a brain tumor and is told that she has a few days to live. Gowri and later Venba discover Mallika's illness and plead with her to agree to the surgery. Mallika puts forth a condition that Venba has to find a groom for Yazhini and only after she is married, she'll proceed with the surgery. Venba and Kavin find Kanniyan, a professor as a match for Yazhini. Yazhini agrees to the marriage as Mallika reveals to her that she has faked her brain tumor only to kidnap Kanniyan and force Kavin to wed her. On the day of the marriage, Venba learns that she is Dharma and Gowri's real daughter and is delighted only for Yazhini to blackmail her into revealing the truth as Mallika will accept Venba as she is the real heir of the family. Venba sadly accepts and heads to the wedding where Mallika executes her plan by kidnapping Kanniyan only for Dharma to rescue him and bring him on time. Kanniyan weds Yazhini. Kavin reveals that Mallika has faked her tumor and she planned to kidnap Kanniyan, he confusedly also reveals that Mallika herself had revealed to Ravi that Kanniyan was kidnapped. As the whole family reaches home, Gowri welcomes the newlyweds home taking arti. Venba and Kavin start to leave saying they can't enter without paying back the money. Mallika calls out to Venba and also identifies her as her brother's daughter shocking everyone. She tells Gowri that Venba is her only daughter who she gave birth to. Gowri cries hearing it. Mallika reveals that she had followed Yazhini to the temple in the morning and witnessed her whole confrontation scene with Venba. Gowri tearfully embraces Venba and gets emotional when she refers to her as mom. Dharma apologizes to Venba for being unable to reveal the truth all along and for all the difficulties she faced thus far. He gets emotional when Venba refers to him as dad and tells him not to worry as they're all reunited again. Mallika emotionally embraces Venba and apologizes to her for hurting her all along, not knowing that she is her brother's real daughter. Yazhini cries witnessing all of this but Kanniyan supports her. Mallika happily welcomes Kavin and Venba back into the house, which makes Dharma and Gowri happy witnessing it. Venba makes peace with Yazhini by telling her that she's always the daughter of the house as she (Venba) herself is happy being the daughter-in-law. Kavin plans for honeymoon. Venba reveals that she wants to go to Singapore to meet Sharada. Yazhini happily agrees with Venba as she too wants to meet her mom Sharada. Mallika too realizes that Sharada was right the whole time and wishes to reunite with her. The show ends with the family uniting together and living happily.

== Cast ==
=== Main cast ===
- Radhika Sarathkumar as Saradha Shanmugapriyan. Shanmugam’s wife. Venba’s adoptive mother. Kalai and Anbu’s stepmother. Yazhini’s biological mother.
- Preethi Sharma as Venba Kavin
- Nandan Loganathan as Kavin

=== Recurring ===
- Dharshna Sripal Golecha as Yazhini. Saradha and Shanmugam’s biological daughter. Gowri and Dharmaraj’s adopted daughter.
- Meera Vasudevan / Sirisha Sougandh / Meera Krishna as Mallika Devi
- Sridhar Subramaniyam as Dharmaraj, Venba’s biological father. Yazhini’s adopted father.
- Uma Padmanabhan as Gowri Dharmaraj. Venba’s biological mother. Yazhini’s adopted mother.
- Ponvannan / Nizhalgal Ravi as Shanmugapriyan a.k.a Shanmugam
- Sakthi Saravanan as Kalaiselvan "Kalai" Shanmugapriyan
- Prathiksha Sankar as Ammulu Kalaiselvan
- Mahalakshmi as Deepa Kalaiselvan
- Shilpa Mary / V. Jayalakshmi as Lakshmi Gomathinayagam
- Santhanu Arulmani as Gomathinayagam
- Neha Menon as Sevandhi Gomathinayagam
- Rupini / Rajashree as Padma Shanmugapriyan
- "Saathappan" Nandakumar as Saathappan
- Bharath Kalyan as Mohanraj
- Vijayalakshmi as Deivanayagi
- Vinitha Jaganathan as Vinitha aka Vini
- Jairam as Praveen
- Jeganathan / Ravi Chandran as Nandhini's and Praveen's father
- Mithun Raj as Jeeva
- Gemini as Deepa's father
- Smrithi as Deepa's mother
- Sasikala Shree as Thamaraiselvi
- Meesai Rajendran as Education Minister
- Manishika Vijay as Shivani
- Vasavi as Shivani's mother
- Nikhila Rao / Gayathri Yuvraaj as Nandini Anbuselvan
- Ashwin Kumar as Anbuselvan "Anbu" Shanmugapriyan
- Mercy Leyal as Sanghavi
- Chandhini Prakash as Parvathi
- Veena Venkatesh / Usha Elizabeth Suraj as Advocate Subbulakshmi Natarajan
- Sivaji Manohar as Natarajan
- Munish Raja as Singaram
- Murali Krishnan as Ticket Ravi
- Akalya Venkatesan as Divya
- VJ Azhar as Kanniyan
- Rekha Angelina as Kanniyan's mother

=== Special appearances ===
- Jeeva Ravi as Padma's second husband
- Vincent Roy as Saradha's father
- S. N. Parvathy as Saradha's mother
- K. Bhagyaraj as himself
- Samuthirakani as himself
- Bharatha Naidu as Sandhya
- Venkat Subha as Sandhya's grandfather
- Ambika as Sargunam
- Pandavar Illam family members
- Madhan Bob as himself
- Vinodhini as herself
- VJ Aswath as himself
- Sastika Rajendran as herself
- Anuradha Krishnamoorthy as herself
- Sanjeev as Thirunavukarasu aka Thiru
- VJ Azhar as himself and Kaniyan Poongundran (climax episodes)
- Pujitha Devaraju as herself
- Suja Varunee as herself
- Navya Swamy as Kamali
- Nancy Jennifer as Jeni
- Daniel Annie Pope as Saravanan aka Saro

== Development ==
=== Release ===
The 1999 series Chithi having a reboot was first announced in June 2019. It was first reported to premiere in September 2019. Then, it was reported again as October 2019. However, in December 2019, Radikaa announced the making of the reboot version during Sun Kudumbam Viruthugal, and it premiered on 27 January 2020. The first promo was released on 15 January 2020.

Speaking about the series, Radikaa said, "I'm playing the title role and the story gathers steam from the first episode. In this family drama, the heroine is neither rich nor poor. She is a middle-class woman, who takes a vital decision, which leads to many consequences. It'll be interesting to watch how she faces them."

=== Broadcast ===
Owing COVID-19 outbreak, the production and filming of all the Indian television series and films were halted on 19 March 2020 and was to resume from 1 April 2020. But it could not resume due to the imposed nationwide lockdown which was extended on increasing cases and the series aired its last new episode on 3 April 2020. The 1999 series Chithi took its slot since then until its production and airing resumed. The production resumed in July 2020 and the new episodes began airing on 10 August 2020. Initially scheduled to resume on 3 August 2020, it was postponed a week to 10 August 2020.

=== Casting ===
Radhika reprises her lead role of Saradha from the original series Chithi. Preethi Sharma was cast as female lead Venba due to which she had quit the series Thirumanam. Nandan Loganathan was cast as the male lead Kavin. Shilpa and Vincet Roy who played Daniel, Brindha and Vishwanathan also reprise from the former series. Besides Ponvannan, Rupini, Meera Vasudevan, Neha Menon, Mahalakshmi, Sakthi Saravanan, Ashwin Kumar, Arulmani, Nandhakumar, and Jeeva Ravi were cast then.

K. Bhagyaraj and Samuthirakani were cast for guest roles in a few episodes.

Post COVID-19 break when the production resumed in July 2020 after three months, Ponvannan was replaced by Nizhalgal Ravi, Shilpa was replaced by Jayalakshmi, Nikhila was replaced by Gayathri and Sirisha Sougandh, who replaced Meera Vasudevan weeks after premiere, was replaced by Meera Krishnan owing the pandemic. In February 2021, Radhika left the series.

== Dubbed version ==
Language	Title	Original release	Network(s)	Last aired
Telugu	Pinni 2	29 June 2020	Gemini TV	20 February 2021

== Reception ==
=== Critical reception ===
The Indian Express quoted, "The song of Chithi itself makes everyone move back 22 years, creating a feel of nostalgia."

=== Viewership ===
It became the fifth most watched Tamil television programme in its debut week with 8.220 million impressions.
