= Jaat Na Poocho Prem Ki =

Indian television series

- Genre: Drama
- Directed by: Pankaj Batra
- Starring: Pranali Rathod; Kinshuk Vaidya
- Country of origin: India
- Original language: Hindi
- No. of seasons: 1
- No. of episodes: 50

Production
- Producers: Rajesh Ram Singh; Pradeep Kumar
- Running time: 20-24 minutes
- Production companies: Cockcrow & Shaika Entertainment

Original release
- Network: & TV
- Release: 18 June – 26 August 2019

Jaat Na Poocho Prem Ki (transl. Don't ask the caste of love) is an Indian Hindi-language romantic drama television series that premiered from 18 June 2019 to 26 August 2019 on & TV and is digitally available on ZEE5. An adaptation of the films Sairat and Dhadak, it starred Kinshuk Vaidya and Pranali Rathod.

== Plot ==
Badal and Suman are from two different caste backgrounds. While Badal is a dalit, Suman is a brahmin. They are in love and try to pursue their relationship despite the social dictates of casteism.

They attempt to change the mindset of their respective families and eventually, the society. After facing several tribulations, Suman and Badal are reunited and they get married.

== Cast ==
=== Main ===
- Kinshuk Vaidya as Badal: Chatura's son; Suman's husband
- Pranali Rathod as Suman Pandey: Pujan's daughter; Badal's wife

=== Recurring ===
- Sai Ballal as Pujan Pandey: Suman's father
- Avinash Mukherjee as Arjun Mishra: Sharmila's son; Suman's prospective groom
- Amita Choksi as Chatura: Badal's mother
- Garima Agarwal as Sharmila Mishra: Arjun's mother
- Aloknath Pathak as Ramashish Shukla
- Geetika Mehandru as Jhimli
- Daksh Sharma as Rajendra
- Mohit Tiwari as Gajju
- Yogendra Singh
- Sanjay Sonu

== Production ==
=== Casting ===
Kinshuk Vaidya was cast to portray a Dalit boy, Badal. For his role, he lost 10 kg. to fit into the character.

Pranali Rathod was cast to portray Suman, marking her fiction debut with the show. She played a Banarasi character."

Sai Ballal was cast to portray Rathod's father. Avinash Mukherjee was cast to portray the negative lead in August 2022.

=== Filming ===
The series is set in Varanasi, Uttar Pradesh. It is mainly shot at the Film City, Mumbai and Varanasi. Some initial sequences were also shot at Lucknow.

=== Release ===
Jaat Na Poocho Prem Ki promos were released in May 2019. It premeried on 18 June 2019 on &TV.

=== Cancellation ===
Jaat Na Poocho Prem Ki went off air within 2 months on 26 August 2019, due to low viewership.

== Adaptations ==
Jaat Na Poocho Prem Ki is the official television adaptation of the 2016 Marathi film Sairat and the 2018 Hindi film Dhadak.

== Soundtrack ==
Jaat Na Poocho Prem Ki

Soundtrack album by Ajay–Atul
- Released: 2019
- Genre: Romance; Soundtrack
- Length: 3:51
- Language: Hindi
- Label: Zee Music Company
- Producer: Rajesh Ram Singh; Pradeep Kumar

The Jaat Na Poocho Prem Ki soundtrack is composed by Ajay–Atul. The title song is sung by Yasser Desai & Aishwarya Pandit.

Jaat Na Poocho Prem Ki: Tracklisting
No.	Title	Singer(s)	Length
1.	"Jaat Na Poocho Prem Ki" (Duet)	Yasser Desai, Aishwarya Pandit	3:51

== See also ==
- List of programmes broadcast by &TV
