= Aashay Mishra =

Indian television actor

- Born: 10 July 1995 (age 31); Bilaspur, Madhya Pradesh (present-day Chhattisgarh), India
- Education: Narsee Monjee College of Commerce and Economics, Mumbai, India
- Occupations: Actor; Model
- Years active: 2017–present
- Known for: Story 9 Months Ki; Shubh Laabh – Aapkey Ghar Mein

Aashay Mishra (born 10 July 1995) is an Indian television actor who is best known for his roles in as Agnisakshi...Ek Samjhauta and Durga – Atoot Prem Kahani.

== Career ==
Mishra started his career in a theatre company of Nadira Babbar. While he was working as the lead in the play Jhumru Aur Jhumri, he had to leave the play in-between to act in an advertisement for Paytm.

Mishra made his debut in television series in 2017 with Tenali Rama. In 2019, he got his first lead role of Omkar Gupta in Pyaar Ke Papad. From 2020 to 2021, he played the role of Sarangdhar "Sarang" Pandey in Sony TV's Story 9 Months Ki. From 2021 to 2022, he was seen as Vaibhav Toshniwal opposite Tanisha Mehta in Sony SAB's serial Shubh Laabh – Aapkey Ghar Mein.

In 2023, he played the lead role of Satvik Bhosle opposite Shivika Pathak in Colors TV's serial Agnisakshi...Ek Samjhauta. From 2024 to 2025, he portrayed Dr. Anurag Singh Rathore in Colors TV's Durga – Atoot Prem Kahani opposite Pranali Rathod.

== Filmography ==
=== Television ===
| Year | Title | Role | Notes | Ref. |
|---|---|---|---|---|
| 2017 | Tenali Rama | Vishnu Ramana / Suprada Ghost | Episode 53–55 | |
| 2019 | Pyaar Ke Papad | Omkar Gupta | | |
| 2020–2021 | Story 9 Months Ki | Sarangdhar "Sarang" Pandey / Azaad Roy | | |
| 2021–2022 | Shubh Laabh – Aapkey Ghar Mein | Vaibhav Toshniwal | | |
| 2023 | Agnisakshi...Ek Samjhauta | Satvik Bhosle | | |
| 2024–2025 | Durga – Atoot Prem Kahani | Dr. Anurag Singh Rathore | | |
| 2025–2026 | Binddii | Mahi Pathak | | |

=== Films ===
| Year | Title | Role | Notes | Ref. |
|---|---|---|---|---|
| 2019 | Pari & Pinocchio | Amit | Short film | |

== See also ==
- List of Indian actors
- List of Indian television actors
