= Preethi Sharma =

Indian actress

- Occupations: Model; actress
- Years active: 2018–present
- Known for: Thirumanam; Chithi 2

Preethi Sharma is an Indian television actress who works predominantly in the Tamil and Telugu industries. She rose to fame in Thirumanam as Anitha and in Chithi 2 as Venba.

== Career ==
Sharma has acted in Thirumanam and The Harvest. In 2018 she won the third prize in the Miss Handloom contest. She was a famous TikToker, until it was banned in India in 2020. Preethi studied at Shri Nehru Vidyalaya up to 10th standard. But she discontinued her studies and started modeling.

She rose to fame from the Tamil series Chithi 2 playing the role of Venba, and is now acting as lead heroine in Sun TV serial Malar and as Aadhya in Zee Telugu Padmathi Sandhyaragam. She danced in the album song Vaada Raasa with Ken Karunas and Grace Karunas.

== Television ==
=== Serials ===
Year	Title	Role	Language	Channel	Notes
2018	Oru Kadhai Paadatuma, Sir?	Preethi	Tamil	Colors Tamil	Debut series
2018–2020	Thirumanam	Anitha	Tamil	Colors Tamil	Replaced by Vidhya Chandran
2020–2022	Chithi 2	Venba	Tamil	Sun TV	
2020	Poove Unakkaga	Venba	Tamil	Sun TV	Special appearance
2021	Abhiyum Naanum	Venba	Tamil	Sun TV	Special appearance
2021	Thirumagal	Venba	Tamil	Sun TV	Special appearance
2021	Vanathai Pola	Venba	Tamil	Sun TV	Special appearance
2021	Kannana Kanne	Venba	Tamil	Sun TV	Special appearance
2021–2023	Kavyanjali	Anjali	Telugu	Gemini TV	
2022	Vanathai Pola	Venba	Tamil	Sun TV	Special appearance
2022–2026	Padamati Sandhya Ragam	Aadhya	Telugu	Zee Telugu	
2023–2024	Malar	Malar	Tamil	Sun TV	Replaced by Ashwathy Ash
2023	Thirumagal	Malar	Tamil	Sun TV	Special Appearance
2024	Anna	Koperundevi	Tamil	Zee Tamil	Special Appearance
2025	Chamanthi	Herself	Telugu	Zee Telugu	Special Appearance
2025	Dhoolpet Police Station	Priya	Tamil	Aha Tamil	
2026–present	Samanthi	Samanthi	Tamil	Zee Tamil	

=== Shows ===
Year	Title	Role	Language	Channel
2020	Chithi 2 Special	Herself	Tamil	Sun TV
2020	Vanakkam Tamizha	Guest	Tamil	Sun TV
2020	Vanakkam Tamizha	Guest	Tamil	Sun TV
2021	Vada da	Herself	Tamil	Sun Music
2021	Vanakkam Tamizha	Guest	Tamil	Sun TV
2021	Rowdy Baby	Guest	Tamil	Sun TV
2021	Poova Thalaiya	Contestant	Tamil	Sun TV
2021	Vanakkam Tamizha	Guest	Tamil	Sun TV
2021	Vaada Raasa Special Show	Herself	Tamil	Sun Music
2021	Chat Box	Guest	Tamil	Sun Music
2021	Poova Thalaiya	Contestant	Tamil	Sun TV
2021	Thalai Deepavali	Participant	Tamil	Sun TV
2022	Maathi Yosi	Contestant	Tamil	Sun TV
2022	Bomma Borusaa	Contestant	Telugu	Gemini TV
2022	Maathi Yosi	Contestant	Tamil	Sun TV

=== Movies ===
Year	Title	Role	Notes
2018	Kattaduraiku Kattam Sari Illa		
2019	The Harvest		Award-winning Tamil short film
