= Shreya Anchan =

Indian actress

Shreya Anchan Sidhu
- Occupation: Actress
- Years active: 2014–present
- Notable work: Thirumanam
- Spouse: Sidhu Sid (m. 2021)

Shreya Anchan Sidhu is an Indian actress who primarily works in Kannada films and Tamil television shows. She is best known for her work in the soap opera Thirumanam (2017–2018).

== Career ==
She made her debut with the Kannada film Chaturbhuja (2014). The film was released to mixed reviews with a critic calling her performance as one of the highlights. She then appeared in the Tulu film Jai Tulunadu before starring in the Kannada serial Aramane . She garnered notice for her roles in Ondu Motteya Kathe (2017) and Katheyondu Shuruvagide (2018). She played a lead role in the Tamil television series Thirumanam and a supporting role in the Kannada film Soojidaara (2019). She was brought in as Reshma Venkatesh's replacement in Anbudan Kushi and played one of the leads in Zee Tamil's Rajini and Valliyin Velan.

== Personal life ==
Originally from Mangalore, Shreya Anchan's mother tongue is Tulu and she knew Kannada. She later learnt Tamil following a career in television. She married her Thirumanam co-star Sidhu Sid.

== Filmography ==
Year	Title	Role	Language	Notes	Ref.
2014	Chaturbhuja	Shreya	Kannada		
2016	Jai Tulunadu		Tulu		
2017	Ondu Motteya Kathe	Moha	Kannada		
2018	Katheyondu Shuruvagide	Swarna	Kannada	Nominated—Filmfare Award for Best Supporting Actress – Kannada	
2019	Soojidaara	Prajna Hegde	Kannada		
2019	Randhawa		Kannada		
2021	Ainthu Unarvugal		Tamil		

=== Television ===
Year	Title	Role	Network	Language	Notes	Ref.
2016–2018	Aramane		Udaya TV	Kannada		
2017–2018	Nandini	Gayathri/Sandhya	Sun TV; Udaya TV	Tamil; Kannada	Shot in two languages	
2018–2020	Thirumanam	Janani Santhosh	Colors Tamil	Tamil		
2021	Anbudan Kushi	Kushi	Star Vijay	Tamil	Replaced Reshma Venkatesh	
2021–2023	Rajini	Rajini	Zee Tamil	Tamil		
2024–2025	Valliyin Velan	Valli	Zee Tamil	Tamil		
2026	Cooku with Comali season 7	Contestant	Star Vijay	Tamil	Reality - Cooking show	
