= Malar (2023 TV series) =

- Genre: Drama
- Written by: Dialogue; Karthik Yuvaraj
- Screenplay by: Iyyappan Sabapathy
- Directed by: A. Jawahar
- Starring: Ashwathy Ash; VJ Surendhar Raj
- Theme music composer: Visu
- Opening theme: Malare Malare by Anuradha Sriram
- Country of origin: India
- Original language: Tamil
- No. of seasons: 1
- No. of episodes: 585

Production
- Producer: Vaidehi Ramamurthy
- Cinematography: P. Chellapandi
- Editor: Ashok Anthony
- Camera setup: Multi-camera
- Running time: approx.20-22 minutes per episode
- Production companies: Sun Entertainment; Vision Time India Private Limited

Original release
- Network: Sun TV
- Release: 27 February 2023 – 1 February 2025

Malar (transl. Flower) is an Indian Tamil-language television series that aired from 2023 to 2025. The series stars Ashwathy Ash, VJ Surendhar Raj, Sunitha Srinivasan, and Varun Udhay. It was directed by A. Jawahar and produced under the banner of Sun Entertainment and Vision Time India Private Limited.

The series premiered on 27 February 2023 on Sun TV, replacing the serial Abhiyum Naanum. It was broadcast from Monday to Saturday and concluded on 1 February 2025, after which it was replaced by the serial Poongodi. The show is also available for streaming on the digital platform Sun NXT.

== Cast ==
=== Main ===
- Preethi Sharma (2023–2024) / Ashwathy Ash (2024–2025) as Malar Arjun: Parvathi's sister; Arjun's wife
- VJ Agni Natchathiram (2023–2024) / VJ Surendhar Raj (2024–2025) as Arjun Vishwanathan: Malar's husband

=== Recurring ===
- Nivisha Kingkon (2023) / Sunitha Srinivasan (2023–2025) as Parvathi Santhosh: Malar's sister; Santhosh's wife
- Varun Udhai as Santhosh: Parvathi's husband (2023–2025)
- Akhila Prakash as Durga Anand: Anand's wife; Prathap's love interest (2023–2025) (Main antagonist)
- Niharika Harshu as Senbagavalli Vishwanathan: Arjun's mother (2023–2025)
- Ravikanth/Auditor Sridhar as Vishwanathan: Senbagavalli's husband; Arjun's father
- Dev Anand Sharma as Anand: Durga's husband (2023–2025)
- Sekar Raja in dual roles as:
  - Prathap: Prakash's elder brother; Durga's love interest
  - Prakash: Prathap's younger brother
- V. M. Rajesh Kanna as Krishnamurthy (2023–2025)
- Bavithran as Siva: Durga's brother (2023–2025) (Antagonist)
- Divya Dharmaraj as Nikitha: Arjun's ex-fiancée (2023–2025)
- Srilekha Rajendran as Lakshmi: Parvathi and Malar's aunt (2023–2025)
- Indiran as Katterumbu: Malar's friend (2023–2025)
- Meenakshi Muruha as Sakuntala (2023–2025)
- Bala as Vasu: Parvathi and Malar's cousin; Sakuntala's son (2023–2025)
- Usha Elizabeth Suraj as Suseela: Santhosh and Aishwarya's mother (2023–2025)
- Jayashree as Aishwarya: Santhosh's sister (2023)
- D. S. R. Seenivasan (2023)
- Kalaivel (2023)

== Production ==
=== Casting ===

Preethi Sharma was initially cast in the female lead role as Malar, marking her return to Tamil television after a brief hiatus. However, on 3 July 2024, she was replaced by actress Ashwathy Ash. VJ Agni Natchathiram played the male lead alongside her. In early January 2024, he exited the show citing an injury, and was subsequently replaced by VJ Surendhar Raj, who took over the role of Arjun.

Actress Nivisha Kingkon was originally cast as Parvathi, Malar's elder sister, but was replaced by Sunitha Srinivasan in September 2023.

=== Release ===
The first promotional teaser was released on 15 February 2023, featuring Preethi Sharma, Nivisha Kingkon, and Srilekha Rajendran. The second promo was unveiled on 20 February 2023, featuring lead actress Preethi Sharma and Niharika Harshu, and also revealed the release date.

The series premiered on Sun TV on 27 February 2023, replacing the time slot previously occupied by Abhiyum Naanum.
