= List of Darr Sabko Lagta Hai episodes =

Darr Sabko Lagta Hai (Hindi: डर सबको लगता है English: Everybody feels fear) was an Indian anthology horror fiction television series, which premiered on 31 October 2015 and was broadcast on &TV. The series aired on every Saturday and Sunday nights. The series was produced by Reel Life Entertainment. Ending on 17 April 2016, two seasons of the series have been successfully aired. Bipasha Basu hosted the first season of the series. Completing two seasons, 49 episodes had been aired.

== Series overview ==
Series	Episodes	Originally released	
Series	Episodes	First released	Last released
1	26	31 October 2015	24 January 2016
2	23	30 January 2016	17 April 2016

== Episodes ==
=== Season 1 (2015–16) ===
No. overall	No. in season	Title	Cast	Original release date
1	1	"Abbey Villa"	Vidya Malvade	31 October 2015
Bollywood actress, Bipasha Basu decides to break out of her life of reading scripts and plans to meet those who have experienced paranormal happenings for real.
2	2	"Hostel"	Shweta Basu Prasad	1 November 2015
Bipasha Basu meets a girl, who narrates a story that occurred with a victim, who stayed at a hostel named Jannat.
3	3	"Good Boy"	Sanjeeda Sheikh	7 November 2015
Bipasha Basu meets a young boy, who narrates to her a chilling story of boy named Rohan.
4	4	"Cottage No. 6"	Chahat Khanna & Rakhi Vijan	8 November 2015
Bipasha Basu meets a sage who narrates a chilling story to her.
5	5	"Ishita"	Shilpa Saklani as Dr. Shehnaz Mistry & Anish Shah	14 November 2015
A doctor meets Bipasha Basu and narrates to her a haunting story experienced by his secretary,
6	6	"2 AM"	Nishanthi Evani & Abhijit Pundla	15 November 2015
Bipasha Basu takes us on a tour of a spine chilling horror story as she reads a diary that arrives at her place.
7	7	"Happy Birthday"	Zakir Hussain	21 November 2015
Bipasha Basu's search for a supernatural story leads her to a lady whom she meets during one of her ad shoots for an NGO.
8	8	"Survivor"	Priyanka Chand, Abhishek Bajaj & Sonal Vengurlekar	22 November 2015
Neha meets Bipasha and tells her about a paranormal activity that had she experienced recently.
9	9	"Darwaza"	Parul Yadav & Ishita Ganguly as Ana	28 November 2015
Bipasha meets a nun who tells her a real story of an aspiring nun Ellis, who gets possessed by devilish spirits.
10	10	"Selfie"	Rashi Mal, Swati Rajput, Rahul Chaudhary, Avinash Tiwary & Pratibha Tiwari	29 November 2015
Bipasha listens to a story of a mysterious camera which belonged to self-obsessed girl who died and haunts everyone.
11	11	"Carol"	Sarika	5 December 2015
Bipasha Basu recognizes her teacher's cane and is immediately excited to meet her teacher.
12	12	"Lag Jaa Gale"	Sachin Shroff & Pavitra Punia	6 December 2015
Bipasha and her friends discuss about some horror stories where each one shares an interesting story.
13	13	"Anhoni"	Karishma Kotak, Nalini Negi &Pranshu Agrawal	12 December 2015
A Cancer survivor narrates his story to Bipasha about his paranormal experience.
14	14	"Mera Saaya"	Samir Soni, Shraddha Jaiswal & Nakul Tiwadi	13 December 2015
The story is of a woman named Jaya. A woman narrates the story of Jaya to Bipasha.
15	15	"Cell No. 13"	Arya Babbar, Ishita Sharma & Ankita Shrivastava	19 December 2015
Actress Bipasha Basu's hair dresser narrates to her the tale that is related to her ex-lover and involves paranormal occurrences.
16	16	"Nanny"	Lillete Dubey, Mansi Srivastava & Shrhaan Singh	20 December 2015
Bipasha Basu meets a woman, who narrates a supernatural story to her. The woman, Nandini tells Bipasha the story of a caretaker, who started her haunting sessions.
17	17	"Mask"	Aarti Chhabria & Puneet Tejwani	26 December 2015
Bipasha Basu meets the author of a very fascinating book on masks. The author named Rajesh Sharma narrates to her a tale of mask that is horrifying but is true.
18	18	"Raani Nagar"	Puja Banerjee & Vipul Gupta	27 December 2015
Bipasha Basu is searching for a property to purchase but what she learns from the vendor is that the place she is planning to purchase is haunted.
19	19	"Grahan"	Sukirti Kandpal & Tarun Wadhwa	2 January 2016
Bipasha Basu is astonished when Kimi Roy approaches her, keen to tell a story. She tells her the story of Aman and Rashmi, who just get married.
20	20	"Putliwadi"	Arhaan Behll, Tanvi Thakkar & Ritika Vidushi	3 January 2016
A tour guide tells Bipasha Basu the story of Putlivadi, a place that is haunted, a place not far away from his home.
21	21	"Payal"	Nandish Sandhu & Payal Rajput	9 January 2016
Bipasha Basu meets Meenakshi at a restaurant, who tells her the story of Paayal.
22	22	"Keemat"	Kamya Panjabi & Avinesh Rekhi	10 January 2016
A woman narrates to some people. She says that this horrific event occurred with her when her daughter, Vidya returned home from the hospital.
23	23	"Woh Kaun Thi?"	Karan Khanna, Himmanshoo A. Malhotra & Prerana Jhamb	16 January 2016
Upen lives with his flat mate Nirvaan, who goes home for a week long holiday.
24	24	"Kashish"	Sai Deodhar Jagrati Sethia & Vikas Sethi	17 January 2016
A woman is being chased down by someone who then murders her.
25	25	"Raaz"	Indraneil Sengupta as Avinash, Nivedita Bhattacharya as Ruhi	23 January 2016
Avinash and Ruhi a couple are on their way home with their son Kush.
26	26	"Dwaar"	Yuvika Chaudhary & Diwakar Pundir	24 January 2016
A woman desperate to bring back her dead son mistakenly opens the door to hell.

=== Season 2 (2016) ===
No. overall	No. in season	Title	Cast	Original release date
27	1	"Daayan"	Mahek Chahal, Rohit Bakshi & Raina Ahluwalia	30 January 2016
Shikhar and his young student pack their bags and embark on a journey through the dry jungles which is haunted by beautiful but vampiric witches.
28	2	"Rajni"	Bhuvnesh Mann, Anusha Jain & Shirin Sewani	31 January 2016
Few men are seen drinking alcohol and listening to the radio.
29	3	"Insaaf"	Aamir Dalvi, Antara Banerjee & Rohan Khurrana	6 February 2016
A woman waits for the arrival of her husband Aamir but the wait continues for days.
30	4	"Paheli"	Shahab Khan, Parvati Niraban & Gaurav Khanna	7 February 2016
When two drunk men reach a 'haveli' one of them warns the other against entering the haunted mansion.
31	5	"Aaina"	Arjun Singh & Sapna Thakur	13 February 2016
Nikhil and his wife visit a market place, reach an antiques shop and buys an ominious mirror.
32	6	"Siskiyan"	Hiten Tejwani, Parul Bansal & Rishina Kandhari	14 February 2016
The story begins with a girl looking for a job. She meets a man and tells him that she is looking for a job as a nurse.
33	7	"Shraap"	Riddhi Dogra & Vijay Verma	20 February 2016
Vikram reaches the police station with a bag of cash that he had robbed from a bank and tells his horror story.
34	8	"Vaada"	Shweta Prasad & Naina Tiwari	21 February 2016
In another horror and thrilling episode of 'Darr Sabko Lagta Hai' we get to experience the horror story of a girl, who dies after being set ablaze after she failed to give her in-laws dowry. With the help of her friend, she avenges her death.
35	9	"Terrorist"	Abhishek Sethiya, Saurabh Goyal, Prabhat Raghunandan & Jia Shankar	27 February 2016
When one of the cadets named Pushkar goes missing form the army camp located in a jungle, he is announced missing.
36	10	"Lucky no. 7"	Mrinal Dutt & Richa Meena	28 February 2016
A couple decide to buy an abandoned house to spend their lives and as soon as they step into this house, paranormal activities begin to take its toll.
37	11	"Khel"	Ritika Dodeja, Auroshika Dey, Ruma Singh, Shoumita Chatterjee & Taruna Singh	5 March 2016
A man loses his life at the NM Hockey Academy when he takes the instructions and gets to cleaning the academy.
38	12	"Darinda"	Isha Sharma, Vijay Dahiya, Simran Bakshi, Shivam Roy & Kush Sharma	12 March 2016
It's the story of two medical research students, who visit a hospital for a medical research.
39	13	"Gudda"	Sucheta Khanna & Palak Dey	13 March 2016
A boy brings home a shabby looking doll and his mother does not seem pleased about it.
40	14	"Khabees"	Kishori Shahane, Resha Konkar & Farhan Patel	19 March 2016
Aamir finds his old time batch mate, Alia tied up with the chains and speaks to Imaam Saab about it.
41	15	"Jail"	Ruchi Savarn, Anita Kanwal, Sonika Chopra, & Unnati Davara	20 March 2016
42	16	"Khwaab"	Meghana Kaushik	26 March 2016
Atish wakes up in the middle of the night in order to fulfil his lusty fantasies. He finds a girl to chat with on the internet but is surprised to see a shadow speaking to him.
43	17	"Airplane"	Shruti Iyer, Mahima Mehta, Qutee Nagpal, Gaurav Sharma & Aneesha Shah	27 March 2016
A private plane, which happens to be haunted. The guard checking the plane, gets attacked by an evil spirit, who drags the man in the washroom and mummifies him.
44	18	"Screen Queen"	Sonal Minocha & Anusha Jain	2 April 2016
After a man takes advantage of his employee, he realizes that the house he is in earlier belonged to a yesteryear actress Kalpana, who had passed away after committing several murders.
45	19	"Pishachini"	Sonia Singh, Dishank Arora & Anima Pagare	3 April 2016
A female ghost, haunts a house and the people living in it.
46	20	"Aghori"	Samikssha Batnagar, Anjali Singh & Kamaljeet	9 April 2016
An Aghori is possessed by a mission to attain 'param siddhi' or the boon of eternal power.
47	21	"Kinnar"	Amitabh Mishra, Rahul Verma Rajpoot, Yogendra Kumaria, Khushboo Upadhyay, Sheikh	10 April 2016
A woman with her son shifts into the house of her decreased husband which is haunted by a ghost of an eunuch.
48	22	"Uttradhikari"	Ankush Ratnani, Shivani Mahajan, Sonal Bandekar & Sulagna Chatterjee	16 April 2016
A pregnant woman watches a doll and is on the verge of taking it with her. But just then, a wild beast lays his hands on the doll.
49	23	"Haunted Villa"	Mohit Abrol, Priya Shinde & Sunidhi	17 April 2016
A couple buys a new house, who is unknown of the fact that the house is being haunted.
