= Agnisakshi...Ek Samjhauta =

Indian Hindi television series

- Genre: Drama
- Written by: Yasha M Shetty
- Directed by: Randeep Shantaram Mahadik
- Creative director: Amber shri Gupta
- Starring: See below
- Opening theme: Agnisakshi...
- Country of origin: India
- Original language: Hindi
- No. of episodes: 182

Production
- Producer: Srividya Raj
- Production location: Bangalore
- Running time: 22-44 minutes
- Production company: Pichchar Studio

Original release
- Network: Colors TV
- Release: 23 January – 13 October 2023

Related
- Agnisakshi

Agnisakshi…Ek Samjhauta (transl. With Fire As Witness...A Compromise) is an Indian Hindi-language television series which is produced by Pichchar Studio. It is an official remake of Colors Kannada's series Agnisakshi. It stars Shivika Pathak and Aashay Mishra. It aired from 23 January 2023 to 13 October 2023 on Colors TV.

== Plot ==
Jeevika Rane dreams of a happy married life and children. Satvik is a rich businessman who always obeys his father, Narayan Bhonsle. Although he is in love with Supriya, Satvik promises his father to marry a girl of Narayan's choice. Narayan agrees to his urgent angioplasty due to that. Meanwhile, Jeevika accidentally falls from height due to Satvik's negligence. Her family is told that she can never conceive in the future, but this truth is hidden from her. Jeevika's sister-in-law blackmails Satvik's family in order to get them married as she wants Satvik's money.

Satvik does not want to betray Jeevika so he tells her the truth about why he is marrying her and how he is in love with someone else. Jeevika does not find out about it until after the marriage when Satvik hands her divorce papers. Jeevika is heartbroken because she is in love with Satvik. To add to their problems, Rajnandini, Satvik's sister-in-law, constantly tries to create hurdles for the couple so they can separate.

Rajnandini is vindictive and wants to ruin Satvik's family. She pretends to be the ideal daughter-in-law, but she plots against them. She agreed to have Jeevika marry Satvik because she knew Jeevika could not give the family an heir. Rajnandani wants to rule over the house and the business, so she cannot see Jeevika being accepted by the family and Satvik.

Hence, Supriya is brought back by Rajnandini to separate Satvik and Jeevika. The plan fails when Satvik realizes he has started developing feelings for Jeevika. Supriya's true face is revealed and she exposes Rajnandini, but no on in the family believes her. After some hurdles, Satvik and Jeevika reunite and Satvik brings up the courage to confess to Jeevika. However, Jeevika finds out she can never conceive and Rajnandini manipulates her to leave Satvik. Satvik confesses his love to her, but Jeevika rejects him and demands a divorce. Jeevika is not willing to tell Satvik the reason behind her sudden change as her mother had made her promise to not tell Satvik.

Satvik is unwilling to let Jeevika go and strives keep her. Rajnandini continues to plot against him and sends goons after him. The goons end up stabbing him, but Jeevika takes him to hospital on time. Jeevika confesses her love and asks Satvik to open his eyes. Satvik eventually gains consciousness and remembers Jeevika's confession. He asks her if she loves him then why she is leaving, but due to the promise, but she tells him nothing.

== Cast ==
=== Main ===
- Shivika Pathak as Jeevika Rane Bhosle: Manohar and Sukanya's daughter; Pradeep and Swara's sister; Jhanvi's paternal aunt; Satvik's wife (2023)
- Aashay Mishra as Satvik Bhosle: Savitri and Narayan's second son; Utkarsh, Shlok and Aadhya's brother; Jeevika's husband (2023)

=== Recurring ===
- Vaishali Pala as Rajnandini Bhosle: Juhi's and Riddhima's sister; Utkarsh's fake wife (2023)
- Shresth Kumar as Utkarsh Bhosle: Savitri and Narayan's eldest son; Satvik, Shlok and Aadhya's eldest brother; Riddhima's husband; Rajnandini's false husband (2023)
- Daksh Sharma as Shlok Bhosle: Savitri and Narayan's third son; Utkarsh, Satvik and Aadhya's brother; Swara's husband (2023)
- Pradeep Shembekar as Manohar Rane: Sukanya's husband; Pradeep, Jeevika and Swara's father; Jhanvi's grandfather (2023)
- Shilpa Gandhi as Sukanya Rane: Manohar's wife; Pradeep, Jeevika and Swara's mother; Jhanvi's grandmother (2023)
- Abhijeet Singh as Pradeep Rane: Manohar and Sukanya's son; Pallavi's husband; Jhanvi's father (2023)
- Manasi Patil as Pallavi Rane: Pradeep's wife; Jhanvi's mother (2023)
- Kiara Bhadala as Jhanvi Rane: Pradeep and Pallavi's daughter; Jeevika and Swara's niece; Manohar and Sukanya's granddaughter (2023)
- Sakshi Bhadala as Swara Rane: Manohar and Sukanya's younger daughter; Pradeep and Jeevika's sister; Jhanvi's paternal aunt (2023)
- Bharat Pahuja as Narayan Bhosle: Patriarch of the Bhosle family; Utkarsh, Satvik, Shlok and Aadhya's father (2023)
- Kajal as Juhi: Rajnandini's younger sister (2023)
- Vaibhav Bhatt as Manas: Satvik's best friend (2023)
- Rekha Rao as Lata: Utkarsh, Satvik, Shlok and Aadhya's aunt (2023)

== Production ==
=== Development ===
The series was announced by Pichchar Studio for Colors TV in November 2022. It is the remake of Colors Kannada's Kannada series Agnisakshi, that aired from 2 December 2013 to 3 January 2020.

=== Casting ===
Shivika Pathak as Jeevika Rane and Aashay Mishra as Satvik Bhosle were signed as the lead.

== Adaptations ==
Language	Title	Original release	Network(s)	Last aired	Notes
Kannada	Agnisakshi ಅಗ್ನಿಸಾಕ್ಷಿ	2 December 2013	Colors Kannada	3 January 2020	Original
Tamil	Thirumanam திருமணம்	8 October 2018	Colors Tamil	16 October 2020	Remake
Hindi	Agnisakshi...Ek Samjhauta अग्निसाक्षी...एक समझौता	23 January 2023	Colors TV	13 October 2023	Remake
Gujarati	Hu Tu Ane Hututu હું તું અને હુતુતુ	13 February 2023	Colors Gujarati	14 October 2023	Remake
Marathi	Antarpaat अंतरपाट	10 June 2024	Colors Marathi	25 August 2024	Remake
