= Agnisakshi (TV series) =

Indian Kannada language TV series

- Genre: Drama
- Directed by: Mysore Manju
- Starring: See below
- Country of origin: India
- Original language: Kannada
- No. of episodes: 1588

Production
- Editor: Gurumoorth Hegde

Original release
- Network: Colors Kannada
- Release: 2 December 2013 – 3 January 2020

Agnisakshi (transl. The Fire Witness) is an Indian Kannada language television series that premiered on Colors Kannada from 2 December 2013 directed by Mysore Manju. The show formally came to an end on 3 January 2020, after airing for 6 years.

== Plot ==
Two families are associated with Sannidhi, a kind and gentle person who puts the needs of others ahead of hers and Siddharth, a young easy-going, fun-loving businessman. Their marriage was arranged by Siddhartha's elder sister-in-law, Chandrika, who chose Sannidhi because of her infertility and thereby her inability to produce an heir to inherit the family fortune. As time progresses the two fall in love, and Siddharth's younger brother Akhil and Sannidhi's younger sister, Tanu also begin to like each and hope to get married. However, their dreams along with Sannidhi and Siddharth's marriage will be continuously threatened by Chandrika who due to unknown and mysterious reasons (surrounding her father's death, who in turn had a close relation with Vasudev, Siddharth's father) plans to destroy Siddharth's family with the help of her acquaintances. It is also revealed that Chandrika has an elder sister named Radhika who is the real wife of Gautham, the eldest son of Vasudev. The couple have two twin daughters, Kushi and Ayushi. The story revolves around how Sannidhi uses her will power to protect her family by foiling Chandrika's plans.

== Cast ==
=== Main ===
- Vaishnavi Gowda as Sannidhi – Sumathi's elder daughter; Pradeep and Tanu's sister; Siddhartha's wife.;
- Vijay Suriya as Siddhartha – Vasudeva's second son; Gautam, Akhil and Anjali's brother; Sannidhi's husband.

=== Recurring ===
- Mukhyamantri Chandru as Vasudeva – Gautham, Siddhartha, Akhil and Anjali's father; Aayushi and Khushi's grandfather.
- Sukrutha Naag as Anjali – Vasudeva's daughter; Siddhartha, Gautham and Akhil's sister; Shaurya's wife.
- Rajesh Dhruva as Akhil – Vasudeva's third son; Gautham, Siddhartha and Anjali's brother; Tanu's husband.
- Shobha Shetty/Aishwarya Salimath as Tanu – Sumathi's younger daughter; Pradeep and Sannidhi's sister; Akhil's wife.
- Shashank Purushottam as Gautham – Vasudeva's eldest son; Siddhartha, Akhil and Anjali's brother; Radhika's husband; Aayushi and Khushi's father.
- Anusha Rao as Radhika – Chandrika and Maya's sister; Gautham's wife; Aayushi and Khushi's mother.
- Baby Chandana as
  - Aayushi – Gautham and Radhika's elder daughter; Khushi's twin sister.
  - Khushi – Gautham and Radhika's younger daughter; Aayushi's twin sister.
- Rajeshwari Parthasarathy/Priyanka S. as Chandrika – Radhika and Maya's sister; Gautham's fake wife.
- Ishitha Varsha as Maya – Chandrika and Radhika's sister; Akhil's ex-fiancé.
- Chitkala Biradar as Sumathi – Pradeep, Sannidhi and Tanu's mother.
- Sampath J.S. as Pradeep – Sumathi's son; Sannidhi and Tanu's brother; Vaani's husband.
- Sithara Thaara as Vaani – Pradeep's wife; Chandrika's helper.
- Amith Rao as Kishore – Chandrika's boyfriend
- Nagarjun as Kaushik/Tejas – Kishore's brother
- R. N. Sudarshan as Swamiji
- Sneha Kappanna as Maid
- Rajeshwari Parthasarathy as Chandrika
- Shobha Shetty as Tanu

=== Guest appearances ===
- Kavitha as Chinnu, Siddharth's love interest
- Yasir as Adithya Local Gangster
- Karthik Jayaram as JK, Sannidhi's brother
- Skanda Ashok as Raman, Siddharth's friend

== Adaptations ==
Language	Title	Original release	Network(s)	Last aired	Notes
Kannada	Agnisakshi ಅಗ್ನಿಸಾಕ್ಷಿ	2 December 2013	Colors Kannada	3 January 2020	Original
Tamil	Thirumanam திருமணம்	8 October 2018	Colors Tamil	16 October 2020	Remake
Hindi	Agnisakshi...Ek Samjhauta अग्निसाक्षी...एक समझौता	23 January 2023	Colors TV	13 October 2023	Remake
Gujarati	Hu Tu Ane Hututu હું તું અને હુતુતુ	13 February 2023	Colors Gujarati	14 October 2023	Remake
Malayalam	Mangalyam മാംഗല്യം	4 September 2023	Zee Keralam	25 September 2026	Remake
Marathi	Antarpaat अंतरपाट	10 June 2024	Colors Marathi	25 August 2024	Remake
