= Pranali Rathod =

Indian actress (born 1999)

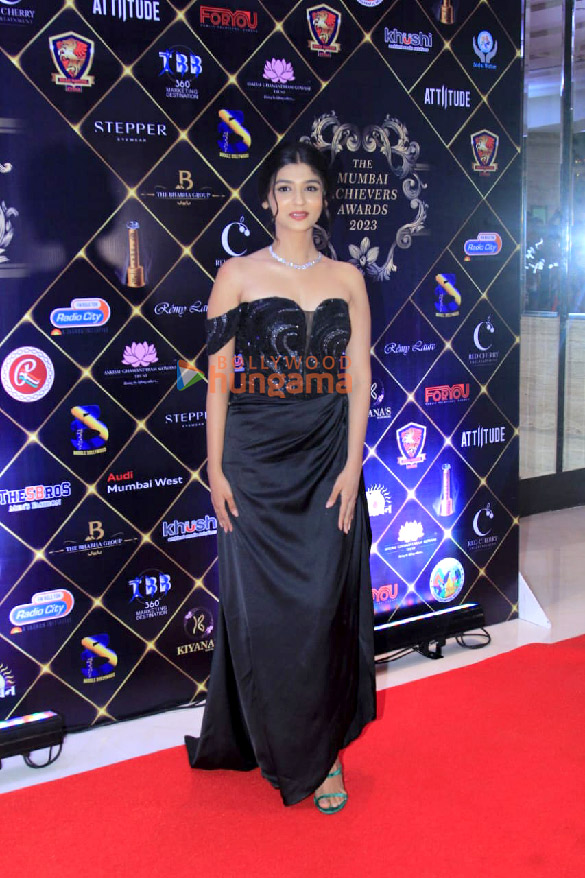
- Rathod in 2023
- Born: 15 October 1999 (age 27); Mumbai, Maharashtra, India
- Occupation: Actress
- Years active: 2018–present
- Known for: Yeh Rishta Kya Kehlata Hai; Barrister Babu

Pranali Rathod (born 15 October 1999) is an Indian actress who primarily works in Hindi television. Rathod is best known for her roles in Barrister Babu, Yeh Rishta Kya Kehlata Hai and Kumkum Bhagya. Rathod won two ITA Award for Best Actress Popular for her performance in Yeh Rishta Kya Kehlata Hai.

== Early life ==
Rathod was born on 15 October 1999. She was raised in Maharashtra.

== Career ==
Rathod made her acting debut in 2018 with Pyaar Tune Kya Kiya's Season 10 (Pyaar Pehli Baar), where she portrayed Saanvi in the first episode. In 2019, she portrayed Suman Pandey in Jaat Na Poocho Prem Ki opposite Kinshuk Vaidya.

Rathod in 2020

She then played the villainous Saudamini 'Mini' Bhaumik Greenwood in Barrister Babu in 2020, opposite Pravisht Mishra and Jason Shah from which she gained recognition. In 2021, she portrayed Radha Sahani in Kyun Utthe Dil Chhod Aaye opposite Yash Tonk. That same year, she made her web debut with Chutzpah, where she portrayed Richa.

From October 2021 to November 2023, Rathod played Akshara Goenka in StarPlus's longest-running series Yeh Rishta Kya Kehlata Hai, opposite Harshad Chopda. The show proved to be a major turning point in her career. She received the ITA Award for Best Actress Popular Drama for her performance twice. In 2022, Rathod reprised her role as Akshara Goenka on the game show Ravivaar With Star Parivaar.

From 2024 to 2025, Rathod portrayed Durga Kalmera in Durga – Atoot Prem Kahani, opposite Aashay Mishra.

== Media image ==
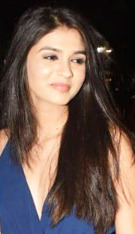
Rathod in 2023

In 2023, Rathod was featured in Eastern Eye's "30 under 30 Asians" list. She was placed 30th along with Harshad Chopda, in Eastern Eye's "Top 50 Asian Stars" list of 2023 and their pairing in Yeh Rishta Kya Kehlata Hai acclaimed as the most popular on-screen pairing on television of 2023. In 2026, she was listed in 30 Under 30 by the Indian edition of Variety.

== Filmography ==
=== Television ===
Year	Title	Role	Notes	Ref.
2018	Pyaar Tune Kya Kiya	Saanvi	Season 10, Episode 1	
2018	Saam Daam Dand Bhed	Misri		
2019	Jaat Na Poocho Prem Ki	Suman Pandey		
2020	Barrister Babu	Saudamini "Mini" Bhaumik		
2021	Kyun Utthe Dil Chhod Aaye	Radha Sahani		
2021–2023	Yeh Rishta Kya Kehlata Hai	Akshara "Akshu" Goenka Sharma		
2022	Ravivaar With Star Parivaar	Akshara "Akshu" Goenka Sharma		
2024–2025	Durga – Atoot Prem Kahani	Durga Kalmera		
2025	Kumkum Bhagya	Prarthana Parikh Randhawa		
2026	Ishq Sarfira †	—N/a		

=== Web series ===
Year	Title	Role	Ref.
2021	Chutzpah	Richa	
2026	Dil Ka Kya Kasoor †	—N/a	
2026	Untitled Netflix series †	—N/a	

=== Music videos ===
Year	Title	Singer	Ref.
2021	Humko Toh Pyaar Hogaya	Raj Barman	

== Awards and nominations ==
Year	Award	Category	Work	Result	Ref.
2022	21st Indian Television Academy Awards	Best Actress Jury	Yeh Rishta Kya Kehlata Hai	Nominated	
2022	22nd Indian Television Academy Awards	Best Actress Popular	Yeh Rishta Kya Kehlata Hai	Won	
2023	Indian Telly Awards	Fan Favorite Actress	Yeh Rishta Kya Kehlata Hai	Nominated	
2023	Indian Telly Awards	Fan Favorite Jodi	Yeh Rishta Kya Kehlata Hai	Won	
2023	23rd Indian Television Academy Awards	Best Actress Popular	Yeh Rishta Kya Kehlata Hai	Nominated	
2023	23rd Indian Television Academy Awards	Best Actress Jury	Yeh Rishta Kya Kehlata Hai	Nominated	
2024	24th Indian Television Academy Awards	Best Actress Popular	Yeh Rishta Kya Kehlata Hai	Won	
2025	Iconic Gold Awards	Best Actress TV Popular	Durga – Atoot Prem Kahani	Won	

== See also ==
- List of Hindi television actresses
- List of Indian television actresses
