= Story 9 Months Ki =

2020 Indian television series

- Genre: Drama; Romance
- Created by: Anjum Abbas
- Screenplay by: Amit Senchoudhary
- Story by: Anjum Abbas
- Directed by: Aniruddha Rajderkar; Ashish Ranglani
- Creative director: Danish Mansurie
- Starring: Sukirti Kandpal; Aashay Mishra
- Opening theme: Love Story Poore Nine Months Ki
- Composer: Sarthak Nakul
- Country of origin: India
- Original language: Hindi
- No. of seasons: 1
- No. of episodes: 102

Production
- Producers: Ashraf Abbas; Akash Thakkar
- Cinematography: Ankit Trivedi
- Editors: Sandeep Singh; Vinay Mandal
- Camera setup: Multi-camera
- Running time: 25–26 minutes
- Production company: Rangrez Television Works

Original release
- Network: Sony Entertainment Television
- Release: 23 November 2020 – 23 April 2021

Story 9 Months Ki (transl. Story of 9 months) is an Indian television drama series on Sony TV. It premiered on 23 November 2020. Produced by Rangrez Television Works, it stars Sukirti Kandpal and Aashay Mishra. The show ended on 23 April 2021.

== Plot ==
This drama centers on Alia Shroff, a headstrong woman who deals with her career, life with a father who disparages her absent mother, and a wish to have a child.

In Mathura, aspiring writer Sarangdhar Pandey sees Alia on TV discussing her plan to use In-Vitro Fertilization (IVF) to become a mother after divorcing her cheating husband Veer Malhotra. He comes to Mumbai and becomes an office runner at Alia’s company, “Direct Dil Se” (DDS.) Alia’s assistant Rahul, who is unsuccessful wooing his friend Mala because she believes that he's gay, tricks Sarang into becoming the sperm donor for the IVF procedure after the original candidate cancels at the last minute.

Sarang’s father Brijmohan and old-fashioned aunt Bua disapprove of his move to Mumbai and plot to make him return. His mother Kalameshwari warns him not to go, but when Alia asks him to come to Mathura he realizes that he is attracted to her.

Although Sarang disguises himself as a Punjabi, he is recognized. Brijmohan bribes a doctor to advise Alia to stay in Mathura for at least three weeks after she faints during a family argument. Brijmohan, Bua and Elaichi (Bua’s candidate to marry Sarang) align against Alia, Sarang and Kalameshwari in a culture conflict between traditional and progressive viewpoints.

After Alia and Sarang’s impending parenthood is revealed, Alia tries to leave Sarang, but returns when she realizes that he was the "sweet" boy she met on her way to boarding school many years earlier.

After they learn that the pregnancy will be twins and once Alia is reassured that she will not be abandoned again, the couple agree to marry. Alia also reconciles with her mother and learns about the lies her father had told. Alia is injured in a car accident, and after Sarang pleads on Facebook for blood donations, pulls through with a donation from Elaichi.

Sarang and Alia’s relationship becomes widely known, and Sarang’s coworker Faheem tries to frame him for wrongdoing. Sarang’s family has come to Mumbai, and he goes missing. Brijmohan is found beaten up, and the police Alia find Sarang in a warehouse. In the hospital, Sarang and Alia make vows and promise to love each other forever.

During the wedding preparations, Sarang accepts a screenwriting job and leaves Mumbai. Multiple ominous events, or abshagun, hint that a happy ending is not certain.

Six years later, Alia and her son Agastya live in Mumbai. Alia was told that her other twin was born dead. She has sold DDS, and struggles financially as a DDS employee. Agastya, who is bullied in school, wants to meet his favorite comics author, 'Azaad Roy'.

Sarang and his daughter Sayuri live in Mathura. He and Alia decided to part ways shortly before the wedding, and have not kept in touch. Sarang has become very successful writing children’s comics as ‘Azaad Roy’, and his old flame Kavya is now his secretary. He thinks Sayuri is the only living twin.

Alia and Sarang begin to share their day-to-day experiences on an online forum for single parents. The doctor advises Sarang to take his daughter Sayuri, who has heart damage due to the car accident she survived before birth, to Mumbai for special treatment.

Sayuri and Agastya are schoolmates, and become friends. Alia encounters Sayuri without knowing of their relationship, and Sarang befriends Agastya under the same misconception. Alia’s job involves marketing the comic characters “Papa Toofan” (Father Storm) and “Chhotu Toofan” (Little Storm), and she makes an effort to locate ‘Azaad Roy’.

Alia’s father Gautam secretly brings her ex-husband Veer to join DDS, in order to gain her sympathy and remarry her. Her assistant Rahul, now married to Mala, works with Alia’s former employees and investors so that she can establish a new company.

Alia and Sarang, on the anonymous single parent forum, learn that their children share a birthday and agree to prepare a special celebration, at which they will meet in person.

== Cast ==
=== Main ===
- Sukirti Kandpal as Alia Shroff: Founder and CEO-turned-employee at Direct Dil Se (DDS); Gautam and Nandini's daughter; Veer's ex-wife; Sarangdhar's ex-fiancée; Agastya and Sayuri's mother (2020–2021)
- Aashay Mishra as Sarangdhar "Sarang" Pandey / Azaad Roy – Kamaleshwari and Brijmohan's son; Kusum and Kumkum's brother; Alia's ex-fiancé; Agastya and Sayuri's father (2020–2021)

=== Recurring ===
- Bhumika Chheda as Dr. Rabia Ahmed – Alia's gynecologist and best friend (2020–2021)
- Dadhir Pandey as Brijmohan Pandey – Kamaleshwari's husband; Kusum, Kumkum, and Sarangdhar's father; Agastya and Sayuri's grandfather (2020–2021)
- Kanupriya Pandit as Kamaleshwari Pandey – Brijmohan's wife; Kusum, Kumkum, and Sarangdhar's mother; Agastya and Sayuri's grandmother (2020–2021)
- Monaa Mokhha as Kusum Pandey – Kamaleshwari and Brijmohan's elder daughter; Kumkum and Sarangdhar's sister; Pawan's wife (2020–2021)
- Sharat Sonu as Pawan – Kusum's husband (2020–2021)
- Anusubdha Bhagat as Kumkum Pandey – Kamaleshwari and Brijmohan's younger daughter; Kusum and Sarangdhar's sister; Suraj's wife (2020–2021)
- Rajan Singh as Suraj – Kumkum's husband (2020–2021)
- Hridaan Choudhary as Agastya "Aggu" Shroff – Alia and Sarangdhar's son; Sayuri's twin brother (2021)
- Avni Taywade as Sayuri "Chhoti" Pandey – Alia and Sarangdhar's daughter; Agastya's twin sister (2021)
- Ashish Nayyar as Gautam Shroff – Nandini's husband; Alia's father; Agastya and Sayuri's grandfather (2020–2021)
- Komal Chhabria as Nandini Sharma Shroff – Gautam's wife; Alia's mother; Agastya and Sayuri's grandmother (2020–2021)
- Tanvi Prabha as Sunita – Alia's housekeeper (2020–2021)
- Anant V Joshi as Veer Malhotra – New CEO of DDS; Alia's ex-husband; Nitya's fiancé. (2020–2021)
- Vidhi Chitalia as Nitya – Alia's friend; Veer's fiancée (2020–2021)
- Shruti Prakash as Kavya – Owner of Kavya's Green Café; Sarangdhar's friend; Vishu's sister (2020–2021)
- Mohit Tiwari as Vishu – Kavya's brother (2020–2021)
- Sayantan Banerjee as Param Chakroborty – DDS's HR (2020–2021)
- Nabeel Mirajkar as Faheem Saudagar – DDS's writer (2020–2021)
- Rajesh Singh as Rakesh – Sarangdhar's friend (2020–21)
- Kalpana Rao as Scarlett – DDS's receptionist (2020–21)
- Pooja Jadhav as Mala – DDS's employee (2020–21)
- Hardik Thakkar as Rahul – DDS's employee (2020–21)
- Sam as Sam – DDS's employee (2020–21)
- Nimesh Balaji Shinde as Ramesh Bhau – Sarangdhar's friend and roommate (2020–21)
- Shivanshu Sharma as Sarangdhar's friend (2020–21)
- Suryansh Patel as Suleiman – Sarangdhar's friend and roommate (2020–21)
- Deepak Soni as Gurupal: Sarangdhar's friend and roommate (2020–21)
- Kaushiki Rathore as Elaichi: Sarang's childhood friend (2021)
- Kavita Vaid as Buaji (2021)
- Aditya Jha as Chotelaal (2020)
- Lakshmi Mehta

== Episodes ==
No.	Title	Original release date
1	"Staying Connected"	23 November 2020
In Alia's office, a clip for the company's advertisement shows how distance and work keep family and friends far from each other, but with the help of technology people can stay connected.
2	"Enough For Sarangdhar"	24 November 2020
Sarangdhar decides to leave home in order to make his dreams come true, rejecting his father's focus on money and power.
3	"Alia Is Upset Over Her Husband"	25 November 2020
Alia's husband Veer is not giving her the time and care she needs due to work pressure. Alia motivates him and tries to release his stress.
4	"Sarangdhar And His Dreams"	26 November 2020
Sarangdhar leaves his hometown for an unknown future. He meets a lady who annoys him.
5	"Sarangdhar Reaches His Dream City"	30 November 2020
Sarangdhar reaches Mumbai, but his mother calls and scolds him for being out of contact.
6	"Sarang Goes To The Police Station"	1 December 2020
Sarang goes to the police station to lodge a complaint about his missing luggage. His bookseller friend makes up a story to hurry the case, but Sarang decides to tell the truth.
7	"Alia Catches Veer Red-Handed"	2 December 2020
Alia spots Veer at a hotel, and he lies to her about how he came back early from Dubai.
8	"Will Sarang Meet Alia?"	3 December 2020
A heart-broken Alia heads to the hotel to hear Veer out. Sarang is trying to find Alia so that he can speak to her.
9	"Sarang Gets Hired at DDS"	7 December 2020
10	"Alia Fires Manju"	8 December 2020
11	"Sarang To Resign?"	9 December 2020
12	"Alia and Sarang's Humiliation"	10 December 2020
13	"A Change In Alia's Life Goals"	14 December 2020
14	"Alia's IVF Jitters"	15 December 2020
15	"Alia's Sperm Donor Hunt"	16 December 2020
16	"Man With Loud Manners, Sarang"	17 December 2020
17	"Mala's Carelessness, Alia's Fury"	21 December 2020
18	"Sarang Gets Sacked"	22 December 2020
19	"Sarang Celebrates Poonawala's Anniversary"	23 December 2020
20	"Sarang Refuses Alia's Job Offer"	24 December 2020
21	"Sarang Earns Praises"	28 December 2020
22	"Sarang Gets Re-Hired?"	29 December 2020
23	"Alia Versus Sarang"	30 December 2020
24	"Sarang's Song Upsets Alia"	31 December 2020
26	"Alia Finds A Donor"	1 January 2021

== Reception ==
News18 termed the show's storyline 'progressive'. The show was lauded by film producer Farah Khan and actress Anita Hassanandani for delving into the subject of motherhood through IVF and supporting a woman's choice to be a mother.

=== Ratings ===
In the UK, the show launched with 10,400 viewers on 23 November 2020 but showed a significant increase with 55,300 viewers the next day (24 November 2020), finishing the week with 37,200 viewers and third place for Sony TV on 26 November 2020. The show found 55,400 viewers in its second week (1 December 2020), ranking first on Sony TV and third overall. The show remained in Top-5 shows in the UK during the rest of the week.
