= Antarpaat =

2024 Indian Marathi language TV series

- Genre: Drama; Soap opera
- Starring: See below
- Country of origin: India
- Original language: Marathi
- No. of episodes: 76

Production
- Producer: Kashmira Pathare
- Production locations: Nashik, Maharashtra
- Camera setup: Multi-camera
- Running time: 22 minutes
- Production company: Virat Entertainment

Original release
- Network: Colors Marathi
- Release: 10 June – 25 August 2024

Related
- Agnisakshi

Antarpaat is an Indian Marathi language television series which is produced by Kashmira Pathare under the banner of Virat Entertainment. The series premiered from 10 June 2024 aired on Colors Marathi. It stars Ashok Dhage, Rashmi Anpat in lead roles and Resham Tipnis in supporting role. It is an official remake of Kannada TV series Agnisakshi.

== Plot ==
The story of Gautami, a young, simple girl from a middle-class family and Kshitij, the second son of a wealthy businessman. Kshitij asks for a divorce on the day of their marriage.

== Cast ==
=== Main ===
- Ashok Dhage as Kshitij Salvi
- Rashmi Anpat as Gautami Parkar

=== Recurring ===
- Resham Tipnis as Vidula
- Pratiksha Shivankar as Janhavi
- Rushikesh Wamburkar as Prateek
- Sanket Korlekar as Neeraj
- Trushna Chandratre as Sayali
- Rajan Tamhane as Appa
- Milind Phatak as Baliram
- Hardeek Jadhav as Prabhat
- Pragalbha Kolekar as Sandhya
- Prateek Salvi as Harshad
- Pradeep Doiphode as Dinkar Anna
- Chaitali Jadhav as Sumitra
- Nia Pawar as Jui

== Adaptations ==
Language	Title	Original release	Network(s)	Last aired	Notes
Kannada	Agnisakshi ಅಗ್ನಿಸಾಕ್ಷಿ	2 December 2013	Colors Kannada	3 January 2020	Original
Tamil	Thirumanam திருமணம்	8 October 2018	Colors Tamil	16 October 2020	Remake
Hindi	Agnisakshi...Ek Samjhauta अग्निसाक्षी...एक समझौता	23 January 2023	Colors TV	13 October 2023	Remake
Gujarati	Hu Tu Ane Hututu હું તું અને હુતુતુ	13 February 2023	Colors Gujarati	14 October 2023	Remake
Marathi	Antarpaat अंतरपाट	10 June 2024	Colors Marathi	25 August 2024	Remake
