= Abhiyum Naanum (TV series) =

Indian Tamil soap opera

- Genre: Drama
- Screenplay by: Karthik Yuvraj; Saba Iyyapan
- Directed by: Natarajan
- Starring: Riya Manoj; Vidhya Mohan; Baby Nidhish
- Theme music composer: N. R. Raghunanthan
- Opening theme: Konjum kili - sung by Super Singer Srinisha
- Country of origin: India
- Original language: Tamil
- No. of seasons: 1
- No. of episodes: 726

Production
- Executive producer: Vaidehi Ramamoorthy
- Cinematography: R.P. Sathiyamoorthy
- Editors: M.S Thiyagarajan M.Prabakaran; Lakshmi Murugesan
- Camera setup: Multi-camera
- Running time: approx. 25–27 minutes
- Production companies: Sun Entertainment; Vision Time India Pvt Ltd.

Original release
- Network: Sun TV
- Release: 26 October 2020 – 25 February 2023

Abhiyum Naanum (transl. Abhi and I) is a 2020–2023 Indian Tamil-language soap opera that aired on Sun TV. It premiered on 26 October 2020 and ended on 25 February 2023 with 726 episodes. It stars Riya Manoj, Vidhya Mohan and Nidhish Kutty. The show is available on Sun NXT. This show replaced Azhagu (TV series) and was replaced by Malar (2023 TV series).

== Synopsis ==
Abhirami, nicknamed Abhi, is an eight-year-old girl raised by Saravanan, who works as a driver for a wealthy family. Abhi develops a strong connection with Meena, Saravanan's employer, and it is later revealed that Abhi is Meena and Shiva's lost child. Saravanan adopted Abhi at a young age based on an astrological prediction that Rajeshwari's son and his wife would not survive if they keep the child before she turns nine years old. Abhi also faces conflicts with Mukhil, Meena and Shiva's indulged son who is envious of the attention Abhi receives from his mother. In addition to this, Girija, Shiva's younger sister, is stingy and covetous and dislikes Abhi and Meena, as well as Rajeshwari, the family matriarch.

== Cast ==
=== Main ===
- Riya Manoj as Abhirami "Abhi" Sivasubramaniam: Siva and Meena's daughter; Saravanan's adoptive daughter; Mukhil's sister (2020–2023)
- Vidhya Mohan as Meena Veluchamy Sivasubramaniam: Veluchamy and Vijayalakshmi's daughter; Eshwaran's sister; Siva wife; Abhi and Mukhil's mother (2020–2023)
- Nidhish Kutty as Ilamukhil "Mukhil" Sivasubramaniam: Siva and Meena's son; Abhi's brother (2020–2023).

=== Supporting ===
- Shyam ji as Raghuvaran "Raghu" Sangilikaruppan: Rajeswari and Sangilikaruppan's younger son; Siva and Girija's brother; Janani's ex-fiancé; Vaathi's husband
- Ramya Gowda as Vaathi Vishwanathan Raghuvaran: Jaanaki and Vishwanathan's youngest daughter; Kaarkulali and Magilni's sister; Raghu's wife
- Akhila Prakash as Girija Sangilikaruppan Sundaramoorthy: Rajeshwari and Sangilikaruppan's daughter; Siva and Raghu's sister; Sundar's wife; Sumo's mother
- Kurinji Nathan as Sundaramoorthy aka Sundar: Girija's husband; Sumo's father
- Aravind Akash as Dr. Sivasubramaniam "Siva" Sangilikaruppan: Rajeshwari and Sangilikaruppan's elder son; Girija and Raghu's brother; Meena's husband; Abhi and Mukhil's father
- Latha as Rajeshwari Sangilikaruppan: Vishwanathan's sister; Sangilikaruppan's widow; Siva, Girija and Raghu's mother; Abhi, Mukhil and Sumo's grandmother
- Aadhish Jatti Jaganathan as Sumohan "Sumo" Sundarmoorthy: Girija and Sundarmoorthy's son; Abhi and Mukhil's cousin
- Jaishankar as Sangilikaruppan: Rajeshwari's husband; Siva, Girija and Raghu's father; Abhi, Mukhil and Sumo's grandfather (Dead)
- Rajkamal as Saravanan: Abhi's adoptive father; Keerthi's love interest
- Yamuna Chinnadurai as Keerthi: Mukhil's teacher; Saravanan's love interest
- Lakshmi Raj / Sekar Raja as Eshwaran Veluchamy: Veluchamy and Vijayalakshmi's son; Meena's brother; Kalyani's husband
- Vanaja as Kalyani Eshwaran: Eshwaran's wife
- Vasu Vikram as Veluchamy: Vijayalakshmi's husband; Eshwaran and Meena's father; Abhi and Mukhil's grandfather
- Dharani as Vijayalakshmi Veluchamy: Veluchamy's wife; Eshwaran and Meena's mother; Abhi and Mukhil's grandmother
- Sathish Arunagiri as Dr. Prakash: Siva's arch-rival
- Master Jerome as Munna: Mukhil's friend
- Roja Sholapur as Jaanaki Vishwanathan: Sethupet Sekizhar's daughter; Vishwanathan's widow; Kaarkulali, Maagilni and Vaathi's mother
- Hensha Deepan as Maagilni Vishwanathan: Jaanaki's second daughter; Kaarkulali and Vaathi's sister
- Nisha as Kaarkulali Vishwanathan: Jaanaki's eldest daughter; Maagilni and Vaathi's sister
- V C Jeyamani as Sethupet Sekizlar: Retired Tamil professor; Jaanaki's father; Kaarkulali, Magilni and Vaathi's grandfather; Mukhil's tuition master
- Tamil Selvan as Kuruvi: Vaathi's friend

=== Special appearances ===
- Parthan Siva as Vishwanathan: Rajeshwari's brother; Jaanaki's husband; Kaarkulali, Maagilni and Vaathi's father (Dead)
- Singampuli as Pulikutty: Rajeshwari's cousin's son
- Jangiri Madhumitha as Jill Jung Juck: Pulikutty wife
- RJ Vigneshkanth as Harrish: Siva's friend (Dead)
- Nandita Swetha as herself: Raghu's love interest
- Suhasini as Meenakshi: Nandhitha's sister
- Baba Lakshman as Meenakshi's husband
- Narasimha Raju as Himalayan priest
- Jishnu Menon as Karthikeyan

== Reception ==
In its debut week, it became the fifth most watched Tamil television program garnering 6.6 million impressions. The following week it increased to 6.89 million impressions occupying the same position as of previous week. The following week it garnered 7.10 million impressions. In week 47, it dropped to 6.853 million impressions occupying fifth position.

== Soundtrack ==
Track list
No.	Title	Lyrics	Singer(s)	Length
1.	"Kannil Pokira"	Arun Bharathi	M. M. Manasi	2:59
2.	"Konjum Killi"	Vishal Chandrasekhar	Srinisha Jayaseelan	3:05
