= Durga – Atoot Prem Kahani =

2024 Indian drama television series

- Genre: Romance; Drama
- Created by: Leena Gangopadhyay
- Written by: Leena Gangopadyay
- Screenplay by: Leena Gangopadhyay
- Story by: Leena Gangopadhyay
- Directed by: Rajeev Raj
- Starring: Pranali Rathod; Aashay Mishra; Indira Krishnan; Parineeta Borthakur; Rishi Kaushik
- Opening theme: "Dil Ki Rahon Pe" by Prantik Sur and Shalini Mukherjee
- Composer: Debojyoti Mishra
- Country of origin: India
- Original language: Hindi
- No. of seasons: 1
- No. of episodes: 112

Production
- Producers: Saibal Banerjee; Leena Gangopadhyay
- Editors: Sameer; Soumen
- Camera setup: Multi-camera
- Running time: 20 minutes
- Production company: Magic Moments Motion Pictures

Original release
- Network: Colors TV
- Release: 16 September 2024 – 5 January 2025

Durga – Atoot Prem Kahani (transl. Durga-An Eternal Love Story) is an Indian Hindi-language television drama series that aired on Colors TV from 16 September 2024 to 5 January 2025 and streams digitally on JioCinema. Produced under Magic Moments Motion Pictures, it starred Pranali Rathod and Aashay Mishra.

== Plot ==
Durga, a young tribal girl, embarks on a journey of self-discovery, navigating societal prejudices, domestic abuse, and her pursuit of education amid unfulfilled love and cultural complexities. As Durga's childhood friendship with Anurag blossoms into a deep love, they encounter resistance from Paani Bai, challenging their bond and her aspirations.

== Cast ==
=== Main ===
- Pranali Rathod as Durga Kalmera: Gayatri and Niketan's daughter; Anurag's childhood friend and love interest; Rajesh's widow; Jari Burhi's grandniece (2024–2025)
  - Hera Mishra as child Durga (2024)
- Aashay Mishra as Anurag Singh Rathore: Vikram and Aarti's son; Anubhav, Charu and Devika's cousin; Durga's childhood friend and love interest (2024–2025)
  - Akshaan Sehrawat as child Anurag (2024)

=== Recurring ===
- Indira Krishnan as Veena "Paani Bai": Hukkum's mistress; Madhav's mother; Vikram and Anant's step mother; Rathore's family advisor; Durga's caretaker (2024–2025)
- Jasjeet Babbar as Savitri Singh Rathore: Hukkum's wife; Vikram and Anant's mother; Madhav's step-mother; Anurag, Anubhav, Charu and Devika's grandmother (2024–2025)
- Sachin Verma as Vikram Singh Rathore: Savitri and Hukkum's elder son; Veena's step son; Anant's elder brother; Madhav's step brother; Aarti's husband; Anurag's father (2024–2025)
- Karmveer Choudhary as Dadaji ji
- Parineeta Borthakur as Aarti Singh Rathore: Vikram's wife; Anurag's mother (2024–2025)
- Digvijay Purohit as Anant Singh Rathore: Savitri's younger son; Veena's step son; Vikram's brother; Madhav's step brother; Indira's husband; Anubhav, Charu and Devika's father (2024–2025)
- Jaya Binju Tyagi as Indira Singh Rathore: Anant's wife; Anubhav, Charu and Devika's mother (2024–2025)
- Madhurima Basak as Suhani Bhattacharya: Anurag's obsessive lover (2024–2025)
- Krishna Soni as Madhav Singh Rathore: Veena and Hukkum's son; Savitri's step son; Vikram and Anant's step brother; Bhavya's husband (2024–2025)
- Aditi Asija as Bhavya Singh Rathore: Madhav's wife (2024–2025)
- Soumendra Bhattacharya as Anubhav Singh Rathore: Anant and Indira's son; Charu and Devika's brother; Anurag's cousin (2024–2025)
- Rishi Kaushik as Rajesh: Meera's ex-husband; Durga's husband (2024)
- Akanksha Gilani as Meera Singh: Rajesh's ex-wife (2024–2025)
- Lavanya Singh as Chandni (2024–2025)
- Kajal Khanchandani as Rajesh's aunt (2024–2025)
- Vineeta Malik as Jari Burhi: Gayatri's aunt; Durga's grandaunt (2024)
- Kimmy Kaur as Dr. Aditi Agarwal: SKH's mother (2024)
- Farhan Khan as SKH: Aditi's son (2024)
- Unknown as Niketan Kalmera: Gayatri's husband; Durga's father (2024)

== Production ==
=== Casting ===
Pranali Rathod was cast as Durga. Previously, Dhruv Bhandari was rumored to play the lead role of Anurag but Aashay Mishra replaced him. Indira Krishnan was cast as Paani Bai. Sachin Verma was selected to portray Vikram Singh Rathore.

=== Cancellation ===
Due to declining viewership and low ratings, the show ended on 5 January 2025 within 4 months of the launch.
