= Darr Sabko Lagta Hai =

Indian horror series

- Genre: Horror; Fiction
- Created by: Raj DK
- Written by: Manish Tiwari; Chandra Pemmaraju; Srinivas Abrol; Swapnil Mahaling
- Directed by: Mahesh Nair; Soumik Sen; Chandra Pemmaraju; Suparn Verma; Faizal Akhtar; Devatma Mandal; Sarthak Dasgupta; Wilson Louis; Prashant Singh; Rakesh Ranshinge; Mayank Sharma; Tigmanshu Dhulia (Season 2)
- Creative directors: Ronita Mishra; Aman Bevli
- Presented by: Bipasha Basu (Season 1)
- Theme music composer: Mahesh Shankar; Sandeep Chauta
- Country of origin: India
- Original language: Hindi
- No. of seasons: 2
- No. of episodes: 49 (list of episodes)

Production
- Producers: Vinay Sinha; Vikram; Priti Sinha; Namrata Oberoi
- Production locations: Mumbai, Maharashtra, India
- Cinematography: Prakash Kutty
- Camera setup: Multi-camera
- Running time: 45 minutes approx.
- Production company: Reel Life Entertainment

Original release
- Network: &TV
- Release: 31 October 2015 – 17 April 2016

Darr Sabko Lagta Hai (Hindi: डर सबको लगता है, English: Everybody feels fear) is an Indian anthology horror fiction television series, which premiered on 31 October 2015 and was broadcast on &TV. The series aired on every Saturday and Sunday nights. The series was produced by Reel Life Entertainment. Ending on 17 April 2016, two seasons of the series have been successfully aired. Bipasha Basu hosted the first season of the series.

Different directors helmed different episodes of the first season, including Soumik Sen, Chandra Pemmaraju, Suparn Verma, Siraj Kalla, Faizal Akhtar, Devatma Mandal, Sarthak Dasgupta, Wilson Louis, Prashant Singh, Rakesh Ranshinge and Mayank Sharma. Tigmanshu Dhulia directed the second season.

== Plot ==
The series is a supernatural fiction, which focuses on a different aspects of paranormal activity, such as ghosts, zombies, phantoms, undead persons, possessed objects, witches and wizards. The series aired on every Saturday and Sunday nights and telecasted two new fresh stories every week.

== Cast ==
Each story had a different star cast. Sometimes the actors/actresses who had appeared in some episodes of the series reappeared in other episodes of the series. Various popular TV actors have appeared like Shahab Khan, Vipul Gupta, Ishita Ganguly, Sarika, Sachin Shroff, Kamya Panjabi, Hiten Tejwani, Kishori Shahane and Mohit Abrol.

== Series overview ==
Series	Episodes	Originally released	
Series	Episodes	First released	Last released
1	26	31 October 2015	24 January 2016
2	23	30 January 2016	17 April 2016

With a total run of 26 episodes, the first season of the series ended on 24 January 2016. The first season was hosted by Bipasha Basu. The series was renewed for a second season and was aired on 30 January 2016. The host Bipasha Basu was no longer seen in the second season. The format of the series had been changed too. The show now focused more on haunting visuals.

== Reception ==
The series received mixed to positive reviews from critics. Kiran Kaur of Bollywood Life gave 3/5 stars to the series stating "The show is definitely a good attempt but has its flaws which are salvageable."
