= Rajini (TV series) =

Indian Tamil-language soap opera

- Genre: Drama
- Written by: Dialogues; Krithika
- Screenplay by: Sargunam Pungaraj
- Directed by: Vaithi(2021); Zaheer hussain; K.Rajeev Prasad; S.S. Saravanan (2022); Y.V. Ramana Moorthy(2022); A.Manjunathan(2022-2023)
- Starring: Shreya Anchan; Arun Crizer
- Theme music composer: Sai Bharath
- Opening theme: "Oli Vidum Sudar Nee.."
- Country of origin: India
- Original language: Tamil
- No. of seasons: 1
- No. of episodes: 435

Production
- Executive producer: Chitra P.S
- Producers: Anbu Aran; Aran Hari
- Editors: Shanmuga velu Ravindhiran, Rajendiran
- Camera setup: Multi-camera
- Running time: approx. 22–24 minutes per episode
- Production company: Spectraa Productions

Original release
- Network: Zee Tamil
- Release: 27 December 2021 – 30 April 2023

Rajini is an Indian Tamil-language family drama television series that aired on Zee Tamil and digitally available on ZEE5. It premiered on 27 December 2021. The series stars Shreya Anchan in the title role with Arun Crizer in the lead roles. The show was ended on 30 April 2023 with 436 episodes.

The show aired a four hour long finale on Sunday, 30 April 2023.

== Synopsis ==
Rajini, a determined and bold woman, who take cares her whole family as a single lady. But things take turns when her love was forgiving to her sister.

== Cast ==
=== Main ===
- Shreya Anchan as Rajini: a determined and bold woman, an IT employee; Ranjitham's 2nd daughter; Radhika, Murali and Divya's elder sister; Shankari's younger sister; Parthiban's wife; Aravind's ex-girlfriend
- Arun Crizer as Parthiban: Anitha's brother; Rajini's husband.

=== Recurring ===
- Srilekha Parthasarathy as Ranjitham: Rajini, Radhika, Shankari, Murali and Divya's mother; Marimuthu's first wife.
- Poppy Master as Padma: Marimuthu's second wife, Meena's mother, Rajini's stepmother (2022–2023)
- Andrews Jesudoss as Marimuthu: Ranjitham and Padma's husband; Rajini, Radhika, Shankari, Murali and Divya's father; Singamuthu's elder brother (2022–2023)
- Subiksha Kayarohanam as Radhika; Aravind's wife; Rajini and Shankari's younger sister; Murali and Divya's elder sister; Ranjitham's 3rd daughter (Main Antagonist)
- Hemanth Kumar as Aravind: Rajini's ex-boyfriend; Radhika's husband
- Arifa Arafat as Siva Shankari: Rajini, Radhika, Murali and Divya's elder sister; Ranjitham's 1st daughter
- Vishwanth as Kuberan: Shankari's husband
- Rithieshvar Rajan / Tharun Appasamy as Murali: Aishwarya’s husband; Rajini, Radhika and Shankari's younger brother; Divya's elder brother; Ranjitham's son
- Sinthuja Mu as Aishwarya: Murali’s wife
- Preetha Suresh as Divya: Anand's wife; Rajini, Radhika, Shankari and Murali's youngest sister; Ranjitham's 4th daughter
- Vishnukanth as Anand: Divya's husband; Rajini, Radhika, Shankari, Murali and Divya's maternal cousin; Ranjitham's elder nephew; Selvi and Rajasekhar's son
- Yalini Rajan as Anitha: Rajini's best friend since childhood; Parthiban's elder sister, Jerold's wife
- David Solomon Raja as Singamuthu: Rajini, Radhika, Shankari, Murali and Divya's younger paternal uncle; Marimuthu's younger brother
- Srividya Shankar as Selvi: Rajini, Radhika, Shankari, Murali and Divya's maternal aunt; Ranjitham's elder sister-in-law; Anand's mother; Rajasekhar's wife
- Geetha Ravishankar / Babitha Justin as Kamala, Parthiban Mother (2022-2023)
- Ravishankar as Kaalimuthu, Parthiban Father (2022)
- Sai Rithu as Meena: Marimuthu and Padma's daughter (2022–present)
- Girija Hari as Nisha: Aravind's elder sister, Bhaskar's wife (2021–present)
- Manoj Kumar as Rajasekhar: Rajini, Radhika, Shankari, Murali and Divya's maternal uncle; Ranjitham's elder brother; Selvi's husband; Anand's father (2021–present)
- Sai Lakshmi as Kamakshi: Singamuthu's wife; Rajini, Radhika, Shankari, Murali and Divya's younger paternal aunt (2021–2023)
- Maanas Chawla as Ramesh Sharma: Rajini's IT Manager (2022–2023)
- Nalini as Azhagamma: Parthiban's aunt (2022–2023)
- Dharani as Hemalatha: Radhika's mother-in-law; Aravind and Nisha's mother
- Bala as Manoj: Radhika's father-in-law; Aravind and Nisha's father
- Sankavi Rajendran as Raghavi: Parthiban's ex-fiancée, fixed by Anitha (2022–2023)
- Revathy Shankar as Anitha and Parthiban's mother (2022)
- Premi Venkat as Kavitha: Raghavi's aunt (2022)
- Babitha as Raghavi's mother (2022)
- Shravan Dwaraganath as Ragavi's father (2022)
- Vetrivel as Jerold: Rajini's colleague; Anitha's husband (2021–2022)

=== Cameo appearances ===
- VJ Parvathy as Sharanya
- Vishnu as Vishnu
- Sanjeev Venkat

== Special and Crossover episodes ==
- The series held a one hour special episode on Sunday for the love proposal of Parthiban-Rajini on 15 May 2022 at 2pm.
- Rajini with Anbe Sivam series held a one hour episodes of Super Sanagamam from 23 May to 6 June 2022.
- The series again held a one hour special episode on Sunday for the court scene on 17 July 2022 at 2pm.

== Awards and nominations ==
Year	Award	Category	Recipient	Role	Result
2023	Zee Tamil Kudumbam Viruthugal 2022	Best Actress	Shreya Anchan	Rajini	Won
2023	Zee Tamil Kudumbam Viruthugal 2022	Favorite Pair On-Screen	Arun Crizer & Shreya Anchan	Parthiban & Rajini	Won
2023	Zee Tamil Kudumbam Viruthugal 2022	Favorite Villi	Subiksha Kayarohanam	Radhika	Won
2023	Zee Tamil Kudumbam Viruthugal 2022	Find of the year	Arun Crizer	Parthiban	Won
2023	Zee Tamil Kudumbam Viruthugal 2022	Favorite Heroine	Shreya Anchan	Rajini	Nominated
2023	Zee Tamil Kudumbam Viruthugal 2022	Favorite Hero	Arun Crizer	Parthiban	Nominated
