= Thirumanam (TV series) =

Indian Tamil TV series

- Genre: Soap opera
- Based on: Marriage to Love
- Directed by: Gopikanth
- Starring: Shreya Anchan; Sidhu Sid; Sherin Jaanu; Preethi Sharma; Deepak Chinky
- Country of origin: India
- Original language: Tamil
- No. of episodes: 500

Production
- Camera setup: Multi-camera
- Running time: 22 minutes

Original release
- Network: Colors Tamil
- Release: 8 October 2018 – 16 October 2020

Thirumanam (transl. "The Wedding") is an Indian Tamil language drama airing on Colors Tamil. It premiered on 8 October 2018 to 16 October 2020 The show stars Shreya Anchan and Sidhu Sid. The series is a remake of Agnisakshi, an Indian Kannada television drama that premiered on Colors Kannada on 2 December 2013.

== Cast ==
=== Main ===
- Shreya Anchan as Janani Santhosh − Santhosh's wife
- Sidhu Sid as Santhosh − Janani's husband; Shakti's ex-lover

=== Recurring ===
- Sherin Jaanu as Shakti − Santhosh's ex-lover
- Preethi Sharma (2018 − 2020) as Anitha Naveen − Santhosh's younger sister-in-law; Janani's younger sister; Naveen's wife
  - Vidhya Chandran (2020) as Anitha Naveen (replacement of Preethi Sharma)
- Deepak Chinky as Naveen − Santhosh's younger brother; Anitha's husband
- Indumathy Manikandan as Maya − Santhosh's elder sister-in-law; Harish's wife
- Vedha Doss as Harish − Santhosh's elder brother; Maya's husband
- Sivalingam Babu as Srinivasan − Santhosh's father
- Reysha as Shwetha − Santhosh's younger sister
- Tina as Aarthi − Maya's younger sister
- Britto as Gautham − Santhosh's friend
- Manoj Kumar as Lakshmanan − Janani's father
- Kiruba as Sumathi − Janani's mother
- Hari Krishnan as Vinodh − Janani's elder brother; Vaani's husband
- Rekha Angelina as Vaani − Janani's elder sister-in-law; Vinodh's wife
- Maithreya Rajasekar as Anand − Janani's cousin

=== Special appearance ===
- Soori as himself
- Urvashi as marriage counselor
- Neelima Rani

== Adaptations ==
Language	Title	Original release	Network(s)	Last aired	Notes
Kannada	Agnisakshi ಅಗ್ನಿಸಾಕ್ಷಿ	2 December 2013	Colors Kannada	3 January 2020	Original
Tamil	Thirumanam திருமணம்	8 October 2018	Colors Tamil	16 October 2020	Remake
Hindi	Agnisakshi...Ek Samjhauta अग्निसाक्षी...एक समझौता	23 January 2023	Colors TV	13 October 2023	Remake
Gujarati	Hu Tu Ane Hututu હું તું અને હુતુતુ	13 February 2023	Colors Gujarati	14 October 2023	Remake
Marathi	Antarpaat अंतरपाट	10 June 2024	Colors Marathi	25 August 2024	Remake
