= List of awards and nominations received by Shweta Tiwari =

Shweta Tiwari awards and nominations
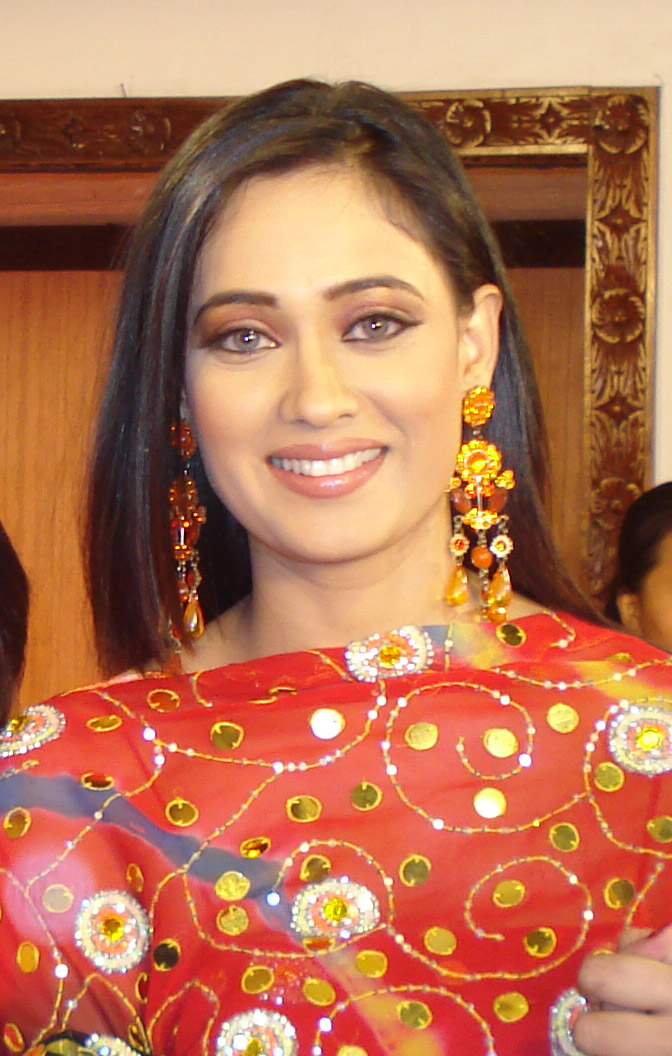
- Shweta in 2009
Awards and nominations
Award	Wins	Nominations
ITA Awards	8	17
Indian Telly Awards	9	19
Gold Awards	3	3
Apsara Film & Television Producers Guild Awards	1	3

Totals (Note: Certain award groups do not simply award one winner. They acknowledge several different recipients, have runners-up, and have third place. Since this is a specific recognition and is different from losing an award, runner-up mentions are considered wins in this award tally. For simplification and to avoid errors, each award in this list has been presumed to have had a prior nomination.)
- Wins: 22
- Nominations: 43

Shweta Tiwari is an Indian actress who primarily works in the Hindi television industry, where she has established herself as a leading actress. She is the recipient of several awards, including six ITA Awards and eight Indian Telly Awards. She received most of the awards for her performance in the television series Kasautii Zindagii Kay (2001-2008).

== ITA Awards ==
Category	Character	Show	Result
Year-2002
Best Actress - Drama (Jury)	Prerna Sharma	Kasautii Zindagii Kay	Nominated
Best Actress - Drama (Popular)	Prerna Sharma	Kasautii Zindagii Kay	Nominated
Year-2003
Best Actress - Drama (Jury)	Prerna Basu	Kasautii Zindagii Kay	Won
Best Actress - Drama (Popular)	Prerna Basu	Kasautii Zindagii Kay	Nominated
Year-2004
Best Actress - Drama (Jury)	Prerna Basu	Kasautii Zindagii Kay	Nominated
Best Actress - Drama (Popular)	Prerna Basu	Kasautii Zindagii Kay	Nominated
Year-2005
Best Actress - Drama (Jury)	Prerna Bajaj	Kasautii Zindagii Kay	Nominated
Best Actress - Drama (Popular)	Prerna Bajaj	Kasautii Zindagii Kay	Nominated
Gr8! Face of the Year - Female	Prerna Bajaj	Kasautii Zindagii Kay	Nominated
Year-2006
Best Actress - Drama (Jury)	Prerna Bajaj	Kasautii Zindagii Kay	Won
Best Actress - Drama (Popular)	Prerna Bajaj	Kasautii Zindagii Kay	Nominated
Year-2007
Best Actress - Drama (Popular)	Prerna Bajaj	Kasautii Zindagii Kay	Nominated
Gr8! Face of the Year - Female	Prerna Bajaj	Kasautii Zindagii Kay	Nominated
Year-2008
Best Actress - Drama (Jury)	Aradhana	Jaane Kya Baat Hui	Nominated
Year-2009
Best Actress - Drama (Jury)	Aradhana	Jaane Kya Baat Hui	Nominated
Year-2010
Best TV Host/Anchor	Herself	Jhalak Dikhhla Jaa 3	Nominated
Year-2012
Best Actress - Drama (Jury)	Sweety Ahluwalia	Parvarrish – Kuchh Khattee Kuchh Meethi	Won
Best Actress - Drama (Popular)	Sweety Ahluwalia	Parvarrish – Kuchh Khattee Kuchh Meethi	Nominated
Gr8! Performer of the Year - Female	Sweety Ahluwalia	Parvarrish – Kuchh Khattee Kuchh Meethi	Nominated
Year-2013
Best Actress - Drama (Jury)	Sweety Ahluwalia	Parvarrish – Kuchh Khattee Kuchh Meethi	Nominated
Year-2015
Best Actress in a Negative Role	Bindiya Rani	Begusarai	Won
Year-2021
ITA Milestone Award	Prerna Sharma/Basu/Bajaj	Kasautii Zindagii Kay	Won
Best Actress - Drama (Jury)	Guneet Sikka	Mere Dad Ki Dulhan	Won
Year-2023
Best Actress - Drama (Jury)	Aparajita Singh	Main Hoon Aparajita	Won

== Indian Telly Awards ==
Category	Title	Result	Ref.
Year-2002
Best Actress in a Lead Role	Kasautii Zindagii Kay	Nominated	
Best Onscreen Couple (with Cezanne Khan)	Kasautii Zindagii Kay	Won	
Year-2003
Best Onscreen Couple	Kasautii Zindagii Kay	Won	
Best Actress in a Lead Role (Critics)	Kasautii Zindagii Kay	Won	
Year-2004
Best Onscreen Couple (with Cezanne Khan)	Kasautii Zindagii Kay	Nominated	
Best Actress in a Lead Role	Kasautii Zindagii Kay	Nominated	
Year-2005
Best Onscreen Couple (with Cezanne Khan)	Kasautii Zindagii Kay	Nominated	
Best Actress in a Lead Role	Kasautii Zindagii Kay	Nominated	
Best Style Icon	N/A	Nominated	
Year-2006
Best Actress in a Lead Role	Kasautii Zindagii Kay	Nominated	
Year-2007
Best Actress in a Lead Role	Kasautii Zindagii Kay	Nominated	
Best TV Personality - Female		Nominated	
Year-2008
Special Honour	Kasautii Zindagii Kay	Won	
Best Judge	Aaja Mahii Vayy	Nominated	
Year-2009
Best Host/Anchor	Jhalak Dikhhla Jaa 3	Won	
Year-2010
Best TV Personality - Female	-	Won	
Year-2012
Best Actress in a Lead Role - Critics	Parvarrish – Kuchh Khattee Kuchh Meethi	Won	
Best Actress in a Lead Role - Popular	Parvarrish – Kuchh Khattee Kuchh Meethi	Nominated	
Best TV Personality - Female	-	Nominated	
Year-2013
Best Actress in a Lead Role - Critics	Parvarrish – Kuchh Khattee Kuchh Meethi	Nominated	
Best Actress in a Lead Role - Popular	Parvarrish – Kuchh Khattee Kuchh Meethi	Nominated	
Best TV Personality - Female	-	Nominated	
Year-2014
Best TV Personality - Female	-	Nominated	
Year-2015
Best Actress in a Negative Role - Critics	Begusarai	Won	
Best Actress in a Lead Role - Critics	Begusarai	Nominated	
Best TV Personality - Female	-	Nominated	
Year-2019
Best TV Personality - Female	-	Nominated	
Year-2023
Best Actress in a Lead Role - Critics	Main Hoon Aparajita	Won	

== Gold Awards ==
Year	Title	Category	Result	Ref.
2007	Kasautii Zindagii Kay	Best Actress in a Lead Role	Nominated	
2010	Herself	Most Fit Actor	Won	
2012	Parvarrish – Kuchh Khattee Kuchh Meethi	Best Actress in a Lead Role	Won	
2013	Parvarrish – Kuchh Khattee Kuchh Meethi	Best Actress in a Lead Role	Nominated	

== Gold Glam & Style Awards ==
Year	Title	Category	Result	Ref.
2020	—N/a	Woman of substance	Won	

== Star Parivaar Awards ==
Year	Category	Role	Show
2003	Favourite Maa	Prerna	Kasautii Zindagii Kay
2003	Favourite Jodi	Prerna- Anurag	Kasautii Zindagii Kay
2004	Favourite Bahu	Prerna	Kasautii Zindagii Kay
2004	Favourite Maa	Prerna	Kasautii Zindagii Kay
2005	Favourite Maa	Prerna	Kasautii Zindagii Kay
2006	Favourite Maa	Prerna	Kasautii Zindagii Kay
2007	Favourite Maa	Prerna	Kasautii Zindagii Kay
