= Indian Telly Award for Fan Favorite Jodi =

Television award category

- Awarded for: Popular couple on Television
- Country: India
- First award: 2002
- Currently held by: Hiba Nawab & Krushal Ahuja for Jhanak (2025)
- Website: Indian Telly Awards

Indian Telly Award for Fan Favorite Jodi is an award given as part of its annual Indian Telly Awards. It is voted for by fans.

== Superlatives ==
Superlative	Best Onscreen Couple	
Actor with most awards	Cezanne Khan; Karan Patel	2
Actress with most awards	Divyanka Tripathi	3
Onscreen Couples with most awards	Cezanne Khan and Shweta Tiwari; Karan Patel and Divyanka Tripathi	2
Onscreen Couples with most nominations without winning any award	Hiten Tejwani and Gauri Pradhan Tejwani; Hussain Kuwajerwala and Juhi Parmar	5

== Winners ==
- 2001
  Not Awarded
- 2002
  Cezanne Khan & Shweta Tiwari as Anurag Basu and Prerna Sharma for Kasautii Zindagii Kay
  - Hiten Tejwani & Gauri Pradhan as Pratham and Gauri for Kutumb
  - Juhi Parmar & Hussain Kuwajerwala as Kumkum Wadhawa and Sumit Wadhawa for Kumkum
  - Puneet Vasishtha & Aparna Tilak as Kabir and Sanjana for Kohi Apna Sa
- 2003
  Cezanne Khan & Shweta Tiwari as Anurag Basu & Prerna Basu for Kasautii Zindagii Kay
  - Rajeev Khandelwal & Aamna Shariff - Kahin To Hoga as Sujal Garewal and Kashish Sinha
  - Hiten Tejwani & Gauri Pradhan - Kyunki Saas Bhi Kabhi Bahu Thi as Karan and Nandini
  - Juhi Parmar & Hussain Kuwajerwala - Kumkum as Kumkum and Sumit Wadhawa
- 2004
  Rajeev Khandelwal & Aamna Shariff as Sujal Garewal and Kashish Sinha for Kahin To Hoga
  - Cezanne Khan & Shweta Tiwari - Kasautii Zindagii Kay as Anurag Basu and Prerna Sharma
  - Hiten Tejwani & Gauri Pradhan - Kyunki Saas Bhi Kabhi Bahu Thi as Karan and Nandini
  - Juhi Parmar & Hussain Kuwajerwala - Kumkum as Kumkum and Sumit Wadhawa
- 2005
  Eijaz Khan & Anita Hassanandani- Kkavyanjali as Kkavya Nanda and Anjali Salve
  - Ronit Roy & Shweta Tiwari - Kasautii Zindagii Kay as Rishab Bajaj and Prerna Bajaj
  - Hiten Tejwani & Gauri Pradhan - Kyunki Saas Bhi Kabhi Bahu Thi as Karan and Nandini
  - Juhi Parmar & Hussain Kuwajerwala - Kumkum as Kumkum and Sumit Wadhawa
  - Rajeev Khandelwal & Aamna Shariff - Kahin To Hoga as Sujal Garewal and Kashish Garewal
- 2006
  Ram Kapoor & Prachi Desai for Kasamh Se as Jai Walia and Bani Dixit
- 2007
  Sharad Malhotra & Divyanka Tripathi forBanoo Main Teri Dulhann as Sagar Pratap Singh and Vidya Pratap Singh
  - Cezanne Khan & Shweta Tiwari - Kasautii Zindagii Kay as Anurag Basu and Prerna Bajaj
  - Hiten Tejwani & Gauri Pradhan - Kyunki Saas Bhi Kabhi Bahu Thi as Karan and Nandini
  - Juhi Parmar & Hussain Kuwajerwala - Kumkum as Kumkum and Sumit Wadhawa
  - Ram Kapoor & Prachi Desai - Kasamh Se as Jai Udai Walia and Bani Nishikant
- 2012
  Barun Sobti & Sanaya Irani for Iss Pyaar Ko Kya Naam Doon? as Arnav Singh Raizada and Khushi Kumari Gupta
  - Sushant Singh Rajput & Ankita Lokhande- Pavitra Rishta Manav Deshmukh & Archana Deshmukh
  - Samir Soni & Kirti Nagpure- Parichay—Nayee Zindagi Kay Sapno Ka as Kunal Chopra & Siddhi Chopra
  - Anas Rashid & Deepika Singh- Diya Aur Baati Hum as Sooraj Rathi & Sandhya Rathi
  - Ram Kapoor & Saakshi Tanwar- Bade Achhe Lagte Hain as Ram Kapoor & Priya Kapoor
  - Gurmeet Choudhary & Drashti Dhami- Geet - Hui Sabse Parayi as Maan Singh Khurana & Geet Khurana
- 2013
  Vivian Dsena & Drashti Dhami - Madhubala - Ek Ishq Ek Junoon as Rishabh Kundra and Madhubala Kundra
  - Shakti Arora & Asha Negi- Pavitra Rishta as Dr. Onir Dutt & Purvi Dutt
  - Anas Rashid & Deepika Singh- Diya Aur Baati Hum as Sooraj Rathi & Sandhya Rathi
  - Ram Kapoor & Saakshi Tanwar- Bade Achhe Lagte Hain as Ram Kapoor & Priya Kapoor
  - Karan Singh Grover & Surbhi Jyoti- Qubool Hai as Asad Ahmed Khan & Zoya Farooki
  - Gurmeet Choudhary & Kratika Sengar- Punar Vivah as Yash Scindia & Aarti Scindia
- 2014
  Karan Patel & Divyanka Tripathi - Yeh Hai Mohabbatein as Raman Kumar Bhalla and Dr Ishita Iyer Bhalla & Nakuul Mehta & Disha Parmar - Pyaar Ka Dard Hai Meetha Meetha Pyaara Pyaara as Aditya Kumar and Pankhuri Aditya Kumar
  - Vivian Dsena & Drashti Dhami - Madhubala - Ek Ishq Ek Junoon as Rishabh Kundra and Madhubala Kundra
  - Anas Rashid & Deepika Singh- Diya Aur Baati Hum as Sooraj Rathi & Sandhya Rathi
  - Gautam Rode & Jennifer Winget - Saraswatichandra as Saras and Kumud
  - Rajat Tokas & Paridhi Sharma - Jodha Akbar as Akbar and Jodha
  - Ashish Sharma & Sanaya Irani - Rang Rasiya as Rudra & Parvati
- 2015
  Karan Patel & Divyanka Tripathi - Yeh Hai Mohabbatein as Raman Kumar Bhalla and Dr Ishita Iyer Bhalla and Shabbir Ahluwalia & Sriti Jha - Kumkum Bhagya as Abhishek Mehra and Pragya Arora
  - Ravi Dubey & Nia Sharma- Jamai Raja as Siddharth Khurana & Roshni Khurana
  - Vishal Aditya Singh & Shivangi Joshi- Begusarai as Lakhan Bhushan Thakur & Poonam Lakhan Thakur
  - Shakti Arora & Radhika Madan- Meri Aashiqui Tum Se Hi as Ranveer Vaghela & Ishani Vaghela
  - Rajeev Khandelwal & Kritika Kamra- Reporters as Kabir Sharma & Ananya Kashyap
  - Apurva Agnihotri & Sonali Bendre- Ajeeb Daastaan Hai Ye as Vikram Ahuja & Shobha Sachdev
  - Anas Rashid & Deepika Singh as Sooraj Rathi & Sandhya Rathi for Diya Aur Baati Hum
  - Parth Samthaan & Niti Taylor as Manik Malhotra & Nandini Murthy for Kaisi Yeh Yaariaan
- 2019
  Parth Samthaan & Erica Fernandes as Anurag Basu & Prerna Sharma for Kasautii Zindagii Kay
  - Harshad Chopda & Jennifer Winget as Aditya Hooda & Zoya Siddiqui for Bepannah
  - Surbhi Chandna & Nakuul Mehta as Annika Trivedi & Shivaay Singh Oberoi for Ishqbaaaz
  - Shraddha Arya & Dheeraj Dhoopar as Preeta Arora & Karan Luthra for Kundali Bhagya
  - Randeep Rai & Ashi Singh as Sameer Maheshwari & Naina Agarwal for Yeh Un Dinon Ki Baat Hai
  - Mohsin Khan & Shivangi Joshi as Kartik Goenka & Naira Singhania for Yeh Rishta Kya Kehlata Hai
  - Pearl V Puri & Surbhi Jyoti as Mahir Sehgal & Bela Sehgal for Naagin 3
  - Zain Imam & Aditi Rathore as Neil Khanna & Avni Ayesha for Naamkarann
  - Rubina Dilaik & Vivian Dsena as Soumya Singh & Harman Singh for Shakti - Astitva Ke Ehsaas Ki
  - Divyanka Tripathi & Karan Patel as Ishita Bhalla & Raman Bhalla for Yeh Hai Mohabbatein
  - Adnan Khan & Eisha Singh as Kabeer Ahmed & Zara Siddiqui for Ishq Subhan Allah
  - Vijayendra Kumeria & Meera Deosthale as Suraj Rajvanshi & Chakor Rajvanshi for Udaan
  - Shabbir Ahluwalia & Sriti Jha as Abhishek Mehra & Pragya Mehra for Kumkum Bhagya
  - Nishant Singh Malkani & Kanika Mann as Akshat Jindal & Guddan Jindal for Guddan Tumse Na Ho Payega
  - Sumedh Mudgalkar & Mallika Singh for Radhakrishn
- 2023
  Harshad Chopda & Pranali Rathod as Abhimanyu Birla & Akshara Goenka for Yeh Rishta Kya Kehlata Hai
- 2025
  Hiba Nawab & Krushal Ahuja for Jhanak
