= Chahat Kay Safar Mein =

Song by Babul Supriyo and Priya Bhattacharya

from the album Kasautii Zindagii Kay
- Language: Hindi
- Released: 1 October 2001
- Length: 1:07
- Label: Balaji Telefilms
- Composer: Dinesh Chaturvedi
- Lyricist: Nawab Arzoo
- Producer: Ekta Kapoor

Music video
- "Chahat Kay Safar Mein" on YouTube

"Chahat Kay Safar Mein" is a song from the 2001 Indian soap opera, Kasautii Zindagii Kay. The song is composed by Dinesh Chaturvedi and sung by Babul Supriyo along with Priya Bhattacharya. The lyrics were penned by Nawab Arzoo. The song features Shweta Tiwari and Cezanne Khan in the video. Babul Supriyo received many accolades for his honey-soaked rendition of the song.

== Development ==
Babul Supriyo recorded the whole song in multiple takes and received much appreciation from the established TV personalities involved in the project.

the song was so popular worldwide that I got requests to sing Chahat Ke Safar Mein in events of Holland, West Indies and even London. You can very well gauge the popularity this iconic love saga had. We do know that this reprised version will also be famous just like the original one.

— Supriyo sharing his experience of recording "Chahat Kay Safar Mein".

== Picturization ==
The song is picturized on Prerna Sharma (Shweta Tiwari) and Anurag Basu (Cezanne Khan). The song picturises the romance and the strong relation between the two characters and their love and sacrifices for each other through their lives.

== Remake ==
Remake of the song was released at 21 July 2018 for the rebooted version of the soap Kasautii Zindagii Kay where the song was reduced to 0:40 seconds.

== Reception ==
"Chahat Kay Safar Mein" was an instant success and topped the charts. Babul Supriyo became the first and till date is the only singer to win both Indian Telly Award and Indian Television Academy Awards for his song.

In the promo Ekta Kapoor said:

"Old memories are back. Babul is a well-known person. He took his time and gave us time and said that I will shoot wherever I am and he has sung with all his heart. He created the same old memories again. Priya has done so well. Lalit has created the same song, old team is back. Yeh Aksar Toot Jaatay Hain, Kabhie Ansoo Bahaty Hain, Phir Bhi Muskuraty Hain are my favorite lines."

— Ekta Kapoor sharing her experience with old team creating "Chahat Kay Safar Mein".
