= Manasvi =

Manasvi is an Indian given name and surname. Notable people with the name include:

- S. Manasvi (fl. 2004), Indian architect, filmmaker, and writer
- Manasvi Mamgai (born 1989), Indian actress, model, and producer
