= Parvarrish – Season 2 =

- Also known as: Parvarrish
- Genre: Indian soap opera, drama
- Created by: DJ's a Creative Unit
- Written by: Bijesh Jayrajan, Dilip Jha, Archita Biswas Jha and S. Manasvi, RITU BHATIA (dialogue)
- Directed by: Vikram Ghai
- Creative director: Sonalika Bhonsle
- Starring: See below
- Opening theme: Shaan and Shankar Mahadevan
- Country of origin: India
- Original language: Hindi
- No. of seasons: 2
- No. of episodes: 152

Production
- Producers: Deeya Singh, Tony Singh
- Production locations: Mumbai, Maharashtra, India
- Cinematography: Dinesh singh
- Editor: Sujeet Das
- Camera setup: Multi-camera
- Running time: Approx. 23 minutes
- Production company: DJ's a Creative Unit

Original release
- Network: Sony Entertainment Television India and Sony Entertainment Television Asia
- Release: 23 November 2015 – 7 July 2016

Parvarrish – Season 2 (transl. Upbringing - Season 2, abbreviated as Parvarrish or Parvarish) is an Indian soap opera that premiered on 23 November 2015 on Sony TV. The show is a sequel to the 2011–2013 series Parvarrish – Kuchh Khattee Kuchh Meethi by the same producers, creative director and writing team and aired till 7 July 2016.

Parvarrish – Season 2 revolves around the families of two female friends who reconnect as mothers of teenagers. It focuses on the troubles of raising teenage children and the lessons they learn from the experience.

The ratings for the first season encouraged the show's renewal for a second season.

== Plot ==
Surinder Khurana and her husband Kulwinder move their middle-class family to Delhi to provide a better life for their children, Jassi and Jogi. In Delhi, Surinder meets her old friend, Simran Gupta, and they revive their friendship and discuss issues including parenting. Simran is an affluent working woman with a teenaged daughter, Riya.

In a Student of the Year competition, Jassi, Jogi and Riya represent their school along with rivals Aditya and Ankita. These latter two make several attempts to have the others withdrawn from the competition, with Aditya exploiting Riya's crush on him. Jogi saves Riya before things go too far

At the culmination of the competition, there is an attempt to assassinate the visiting minister of culture. Someone has also been spying on the Gupta family. Riya is kidnapped in an attempt to force her father to poison the minister, but they instead fake the minister's death to expose the culprit.

Later, Jassi, Jogi, Riya and Aditya – who has redeemed himself to the others – are driving from a party when they hit something with their car. They conceal this from their parents, and are surprised to learn a reported hit-and-run victim was the bully who chased them from the party. They soon find themselves caught in a blackmail scheme. When they ultimately confess what happened to authorities, it turns out that the hit-and-run driver was the son of the Deputy Commissioner of Police, who agrees to face the consequences of what he had done.

== Cast ==
=== Khuranas ===
- Sangeeta Ghosh as Surinder "Suri" Khurana – Simran's best friend; Kulwinder's wife; Jogi and Jassi's mother; Raj's neighbour friend; Aditya and Riya's neighbour and well-wisher
- Sandeep Baswana as Kulwinder Khurana – Daarji and Bebe's son; Surinder's husband; Jogi and Jassi's father; Raj and Simran's neighbour friend; Aditya and Riya's neighbour and well-wisher
- Anuj Pandit Sharma as Joginder "Jogi" Khurana – Surinder and Kulwinder's son; Jaswinder's brother; Riya's neighbour friend
- Diana Khan as Jaswinder "Jassi" Khurana – Surinder and Kulwinder's daughter; Joginder's sister; Riya's neighbour friend
- Deepak Qazir Kejriwal as Daarji – Kulwinder's father; Jogi and Jassi's grandfather
- Meenakshi Sethi as Bebe – Kulwinder's mother; Jogi and Jassi's grandmother

=== Guptas ===
- Gautami Kapoor as Simran Gupta – Surinder's best friend; Raj's wife; Riya's mother; Aditya, Jaswinder and Joginder's neighbour and well-wisher
- Vinay Jain as Dr. Raj Gupta – Simran's husband; Riya's father; Surinder and Kulwinder's neighbour friend; Jaswinder, Joginder and Aditya's neighbour and well-wisher
- Bhavika Sharma as Riya Gupta – Simran and Raj's daughter; Jaswinder and Joginder's neighbour and friend; Aditya's girlfriend
- Seema Sharma as Mrs. Gupta – Raj's mother; Riya's grandmother

=== Recurring ===
- Jitendra Nokewal as Aditya Kapoor – Riya's boyfriend; Jassi and Jogi's friend
- Jovita Jose as Ankita Mehra – Jassi's rival
- Sushant Mohindru as Rahul – Jassi's friend
- Aamir Dalvi as Sumedh Singh – Coach of SOTY
- Bhoomika Sharma as Dolly – Riya's best friend
- Simran Budharup as Meenu – Ankita's best friend
