= Gudiya Hamari Sabhi Pe Bhari =

Indian television series

- Genre: Comedy; Drama; Sitcom
- Created by: Essel Vision Productions
- Written by: Samta Sagar
- Directed by: Imtiaz Punjabi; Iqbaal Rizzvi
- Creative director: Shashank Srivastava
- Starring: Sarika Bahroliya; Karam Rajpal; Sarrtaj Gill
- Country of origin: India
- Original language: Hindi
- No. of seasons: 1
- No. of episodes: 340

Production
- Production locations: Chanderi; Mumbai
- Camera setup: Multi camera
- Running time: 21 Minutes
- Production company: Essel Vision Productions

Original release
- Network: &TV; ZEE5
- Release: 27 August 2019 – 26 March 2021

Related
- Gudiya Ki Shaadi

Gudiya Hamari Sabhi Pe Bhari is an Indian television comedy drama which premiered on August 27, 2019, on &TV, starring Sarika Bahroliya, Karam Rajpal and Sartaj Gill. The story revolves around Gudiya, a goofy, ordinary looking, free-spirited girl whose family is desperate to find a spouse for her.

== Plot ==
Gudiya Humari Sabhi Pe Bhari is a Hindi television comedy drama show starring Sarika Bahroliya, Sartaj Gill and Karam Rajpal. The story revolves around Gudiya, a goofy, ordinary looking, free-spirited girl whose family is desperate to find a spouse for her. After being rejected by many men, her family finally finds a boy for her. Will Gudiya find her true soul mate?

Gudiya creates troubles and solves the trouble with her funny activities. Gudiya shows her positive side beautifully in whole series, and story ends up without Gudiya's Marriage

== Cast ==
=== Main ===
- Sarika Bahroliya as Pratibha Gupta a.k.a. Gudiya— Sarla and Radhe's daughter Alka and Pappu's sister (2019– 2021)
  - Sarika Bahroliya as Jhumri— Gudiya's look-alike (2020)

=== Recurring ===
- Samta Sagar as Sarla Gupta– Radhe's wife, Alka, Pappu and Gudiya's mother (2019– 2021)
- Ravi Mahashabde as Radhe Mohan Gupta– Sarla's husband, Alka, Pappu and Gudiya's father (2019– 2021)
- Manmohan Tiwari as Pradeep Gupta a.k.a. Pappu– Sarla and Radhe's son, Sweety's husband, Alka and Gudiya's brother (2019– 2021)
- Shweta Rajput as Sweety Gupta– Pappu's wife, Nanhelal's daughter (2019– 2021)
- Sudheer Neema as Nanhelal Gupta– Sweety's father (2019– 2021)
- Sarrtaj Gill as Muddhu Kandhele– Gudiya's fiancé (2019)
- Karam Rajpal as Guddu Pahalwan– Gudiya's Friend (2020– 2021)
- Neela Mulherkar as Savitri Gupta a.k.a. Jiya– Radhe's mother, Alka, Gudiya and Pappu's grandmother (2019– 2021)
- Khushboo Jain as Alka Gupta– Radhe and Sarla's daughter, Gudiya and Pappu's sister (2019– 2021)
- Abdur Rehman Shaikh as Bantu– Alka's son, Pappu and Gudiya's nephew (2019– 2021)
- Riney Aryaa as Jasleen
- Saroj Sharma as Rajkumari– Alka, Gudiya and Pappu's aunt, Sarla's aunt (2020)
- Abha Parmar as PutliBai– Guddu's grandmother (2020– 2021)
- Madhuri Sanjeev as Harbheji (2020)

=== Episodic Cast (Guest Appearance) ===
- Shivam Sengar as Raju
- Manish Kaushik as Vinod– Alka's husband
- Dolly Kaushik as Rubi Gupta– Pappu, Alka and Gudiya's cousin sister
- Chandrahas Pandey as Suresh Nagoriya– Rubi's ex-fiancé
- Nirmal Choudhary as Shyam Gupta– Radhe's brother, Rubi's father
- Aliraza Naamdar as Hukumchand Kandhele– Muddhu's father
- Ashiwini Shukla as Saroj– Sweety'friend, Pappu's ex-girlfriend
- Habib Mithiborwala as Rocky
- Zayn Khan as 1st boy to meet gudiya
- Anmol Jain as Manoj
- Pari Gala as Sajili
- Urmeila M Sharma as Kamla
- Anjali Singh as Fraud ghost
- Ishitiyak Khan as Ballu
- Saurabh Patel as Manoj Pathak
- Manisha Rani as Manisha Rani
- Khushboo Sawan as Champa/Suman– Ballu's first wife, Pappu's ex-girlfriend
- Kaushiki Rathore as Chameli– Ballu's second wife
- Jyotsana Trivedi as Menaka
- Kishan Bhan as Mathai Dadda - caretaker of Putlibai's haveli
- Aman Gandhi as Gabbar
- Roslyn D'souza as Nanhi
- Braj Kishor as Madhav
- Pawan Singh as Atta Chacha
- Sambhavna Seth as Mahua
- Amit Poddar as Monti– Bhojpuri director
- Juhi Aslam as Vandana Pateriya
- Shubham Vyas as Neelu Pathak– Vandana's lover
- Payal Sharma as Pinki– Vandana's cousin
- Rani Chatterjee as Gulabo
- Sandeep Aanand as Sandeep a.k.a. Chamatkaar
- Neha Kandalgaonkar as Guest appearance (Dance performance with Sandeep)
- Annu Awasthi as himself
- Bhavana Balsavar as Babli Bua
- Vivaan Mudgal as Nikka
- Jay Soni as Hulchal Pandey
- Gopi Desai as Bijli Amma
- Ankur Jain as Vidyut
- Harshi Sharma as Komal
- Saachi Tiwari as Dolly
- Shefali Rana as Gudiya's Taiji
