= Gautami Kapoor =

Indian television actress

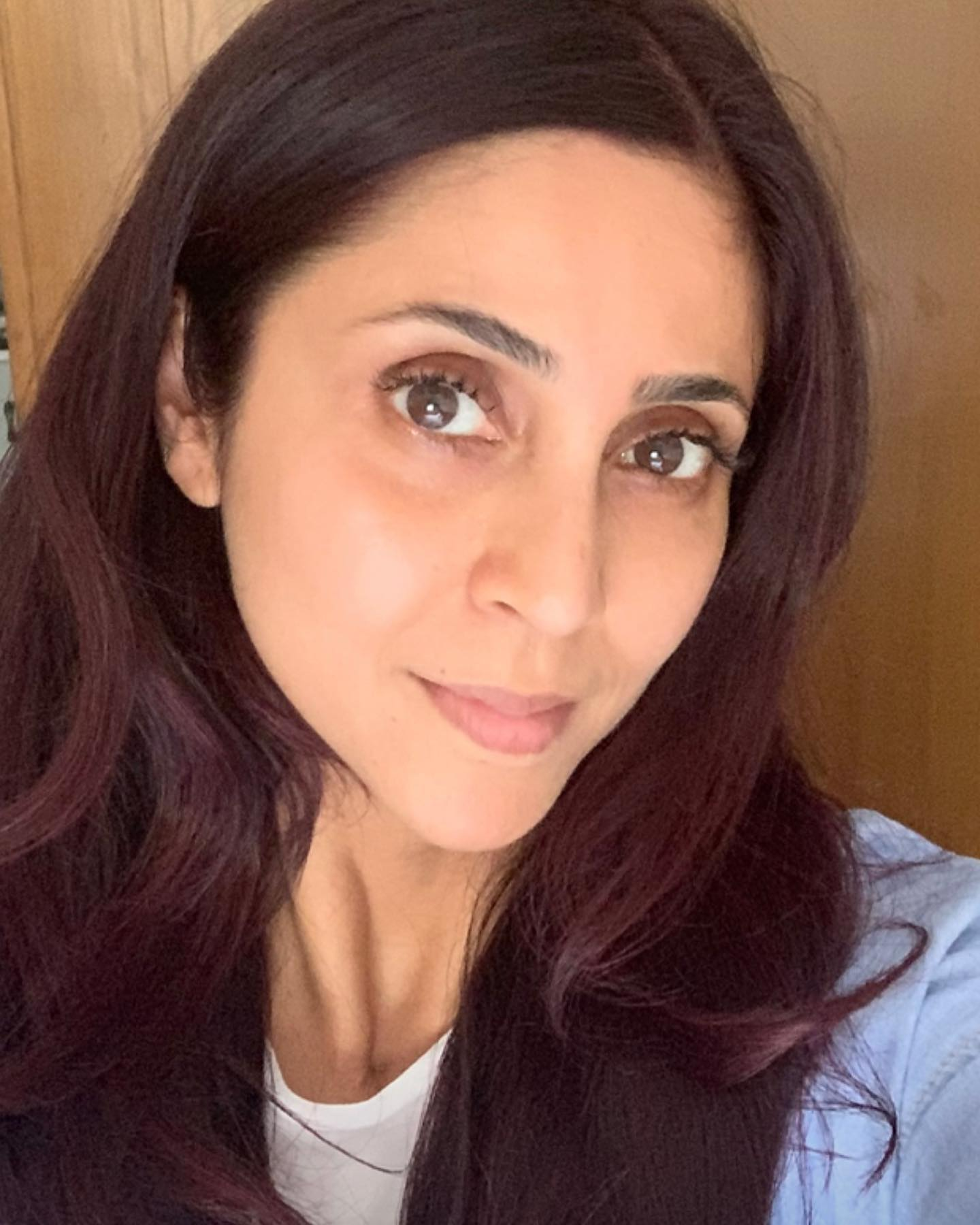
- Kapoor in 2025
- Born: Gautami Gadgil; Mumbai, Maharashtra, India
- Occupations: Actor; model
- Years active: 1999–present
- Spouses: Madhur Shroff (divorced); Ram Kapoor (m. 2003)
- Children: 2

Gautami Kapoor (née Gadgil; born 21 Jun 1974) is an Indian actress who primarily works in Hindi films and television. She is best known for playing the role of Jaya in the TV series Kehta Hai Dil. She also gained popularity as the lead in the TV drama Ghar Ek Mandir and more recently in Parvarrish - Season 2. Kapoor has also appeared in several films including Fanaa (2006), Student of the Year (2012) and De De Pyaar De 2 (2025), all of which were box office success.

== Personal life ==
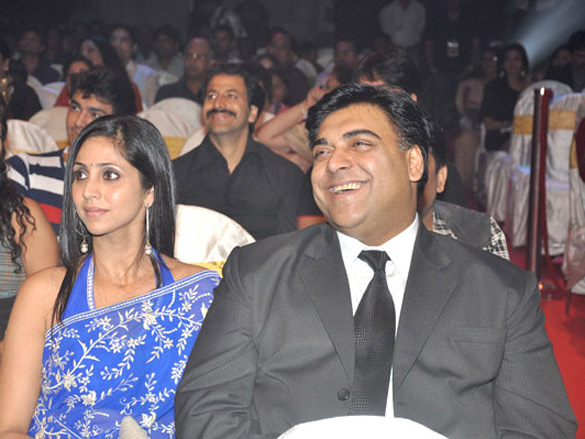
Kapoor with her husband, Ram Kapoor

Kapoor met actor Ram Kapoor in 2000 on the set of Ghar Ek Mandir. After dating for two years, the couple got married on 14 February 2003. They have two children..

== Filmography ==
=== Films ===
Year	Title	Role	Notes	Ref.
1999	Bindhast	Mayuri "Mayu"	Marathi film	
2001	Pyaar Tune Kya Kiya	Mrs. Jaiswal		
2003	Kuch Naa Kaho	Poonam "Pony"	Special appearance	
2006	Fanaa	Rubina "Ruby" Ansari		
2012	Student of the Year	Gayatri Nanda		
2014	Shaadi Ke Side Effects	Aanchal Malik Malhotra		
2014	Lekar Hum Deewana Dil	Marriage Counselor		
2021	Satyameva Jayate 2	Suhasini Devi Azad		
2025	De De Pyaar De 2	Anju "Rajji" Khurana		

=== Television ===
Year	Title	Role	Notes	Ref.
1997–1999	Saturday Suspense	Renu	Episode: "The Switch"	
1997–1999	Saturday Suspense	Neelam	Episode: "Agar"	
1998	Family No.1	Priya		
1999	CID	Anupama Shrivastav	Episode: "The Cross Connection"	
2000	Alag Alag			
2000–2002	Ghar Ek Mandir	Aanchal		
2002	Dhadkan	Chanchal		
2002	Kehta Hai Dil	Dr. Jaya Singh		
2003–2004	Lipstick	Tulsi Gayatri		
2007–2008	Kyunki Saas Bhi Kabhi Bahu Thi	Juhi Thakral / Fake Tulsi Virani		
2013	Khelti Hai Zindagi Aankh Micholi	Shruti Joshipura Mehta		
2015	Tere Sheher Mein	Sneha Chaubey Mathur		
2015	Parvarrish 2	Simran Gupta		

=== Web series ===
Year	Title	Role	Notes	Ref.
2020–2025	Special OPS	Saroj Singh		
2021	Special Ops 1.5: The Himmat Story	Saroj Singh		
2024	Gyaarah Gyaarah	Sanjana Tiwari		
2025	The Ba***ds of Bollywood	Anu Talwar		

== Awards and nominations ==
Year	Award	Category	Work	Result	Ref.
2007	Indian Telly Awards	Best Actress in a Lead Role	Kyunki Saas Bhi Kabhi Bahu Thi	Nominated	
