= Pal Chhin =

- Created by: Neena Gupta Productions
- Written by: Mir Muneer
- Directed by: Neena Gupta
- Starring: Manohar Singh
- Opening theme: "Pal Chinn" by Jagjit Singh
- Country of origin: India
- Original language: Hindi
- No. of episodes: 98

Production
- Producer: Anupam K. Kalidhar
- Running time: approximately 30 minutes

Original release
- Network: STAR Plus
- Release: 9 April 1999 – 2000

Pal Chhin (translation: Moment) is an Indian television drama series which ran on Star Plus from 1999. It was directed by Neena Gupta, and veteran actor Manohar Singh played the protagonist of the show.

The title song of the show "Koi atka hua hai pal shayad" was written by Gulzar and sung by Jagjit Singh

== Synopsis ==
Pal Chhin is about the conflicts between good and evil. The mounting pressures of modern life coupled with never-ending desire make traditional values look farcical. The mantras for success today are aggression and manipulation. The serial is about the conflict of the old and new as well.

The protagonist, Manohar Singh, believes in traditional themes such as honesty, affection and sincerity. He believes that if you are honest to yourself and good to others, there is no way you can't succeed. But he has to face pitfalls every day for being so out of sync with the present system. He has his detractors in his house, like his eldest son Ranjit who believes in the 'instant culture'. For him, the end is more important than the means, and definitely more important than his father's idealism.

Manohar Singh wants to make a statement that all is not lost and there is some hope left, that we can lead our lives with dignity and belief in our values, still be successful in the accepted sense. These are the moments in our lives, which lead our destinies.

== Cast ==
- Manohar Singh as Manohar Singh
- Gurpreet Singh as Ranjeet Singh
- Arun Govil as Pratap Singh
- Prabha Sinha as Sandhya Pratap Singh
- Aparna Bhatnagar as Pinky Singh
- Shilpa Tulaskar as Charulata
- Savita Prabhune as Damyanti Singh
- Anant Jog as Rajendra
- Cezanne Khan as Rajesh
- Jaya Bhattacharya as Anjali
- Sanjay Swaraj as Shekhar
- Mohan Bhandari
