= Sanjeet Bedi =

Indian actor (1977–2015)

Sanjit Bedi
- Born: May 8, 1977; New Delhi
- Died: June 23, 2015 (aged 38); Mumbai
- Occupation: Indian television actor
- Years active: 2000–2015
- Spouse: Rekha Bhatia

Sanjit Bedi (8 May 1977 – 23 June 2015) was an Indian television actor. He was majorly known for playing the role of Dr. Omi Joshi in Indian television show Sanjivani. He began his career as a model, before transitioning into theatre and, eventually, into television. He died on 23 June 2015, after failing to emerge from a coma, induced by a brain ailment.

In addition to his role in Sanjivani, he also starred in such programs as Jaane Kya Baat Hui, Kyaa Hoga Nimmo Kaa and Kasautii Zindagii Kay.

== Television ==
Year	Series	Role	Sources
2001–2002	Maan	Kuldeep Singh Maan	
2001–2005	Sanjivani	Dr Omi	
2004	Koie Jane Na	Krish Rajvansh	
2004–2005	Saathiya - Pyar ka Naya Ehsaas	Aryan Oberoi	
2005–2006	Kasautii Zindagii Kay	Advocate Mahesh Bajaj	
2006-2007	Kyaa Hoga Nimmo Kaa	Vikrant	
2008-2009	Jaane Kya Baat Hui	Shailendra Sareen	
2010	Aahat	Sanjeet	
