= Love U...Mr. Kalakaar! =

Love U... Mr. Kalakaar!
- Theatrical release poster
- Directed by: S. Manasvi
- Screenplay by: S. Manasvi
- Story by: S. Manasvi
- Produced by: Ajit Kumar Barjatya; Kamal Kumar Barjatya; Rajkumar Barjatya
- Starring: Tusshar Kapoor; Amrita Rao
- Cinematography: Saurabh Vishwkarma
- Edited by: Navnita Sen Datta
- Music by: Sandesh Shandilya
- Distributed by: Rajshri Productions
- Release date: 13 May 2011
- Country: India
- Language: Hindi

Love U...Mr. Kalakaar! (transl. Love you, Mr. Artist) is a 2011 Indian Hindi-language romantic comedy film directed by debutant S. Manasvi. The film stars Tusshar Kapoor and Amrita Rao.

== Plot ==
Sahil (Tusshar Kapoor), is an artist who draws cartoons. He falls in love with Ritu (Amrita Rao), the daughter of a businessman (Ram Kapoor), for whom Sahil had designed a mascot. The story moves on and both fall in love. Her father hates artists, and he decides qand he was h-p she will not marry him. Upon her compulsion, her father decided to hire Sahil as the managing director of his company for three months. He has to earn profits in those three months to marry his daughter. Company politics come into play and Sahil falls short of his goals. But eventually, his dream of becoming a cartoon strip writer is realized when a newspaper decides to publish his cartoon "Office Space."

== Cast ==
- Tusshar Kapoor as Sahil
- Amrita Rao as Ritu
- Ram Kapoor as Deshraj Diwan, Ritu's father
- Madhoo as Vidya, Ritu's Paternal Aunt
- Prem Chopra as Ritu's Paternal Grandfather
- Jai Kalra as Manohar
- Kiran Kumar as Jayant Singh Chauhan
- Snigdha Akolkar as Charu
- Prashant Ranyal as Aman
- Yatin Karyekar as Israni jonny
- Kunal Kumar as Hiten
- Mukund Bhatt as Peon
- Prarthana Behere as Kamya

== Soundtrack ==
| No. | Title | Singer(s) | Length |
|---|---|---|---|
| 1. | "Tera Intezaar (Revisited)" | Reeky Dev | 3:59 |
| 2. | "Bhoore Bhoore Badal" | Shreya Ghoshal, Kunal Ganjawala | 4:23 |
| 3. | "Sarphira Sa Hai Dil" | Shreya Ghoshal, Neeraj Shridhar | 5:22 |
| 4. | "Reaching For The Rainbow" | Jenice Sobti, Vinnie Hutton | 3:44 |
| 5. | "Tera Intezaar" | Vijay Prakash, Gayatri Iyer | 4:10 |
| 6. | "Kahin Se Chali Aa" | Mohit Chauhan, Shibani Kashyap | 4:47 |
| 7. | "Love U Mr. Kalakaar" | Kunal Ganjawala, Gayatri Iyer | 3:41 |

== Reception ==
Love U...Mr. Kalakaar! received mixed reviews from Indian critics. Nikhat Kazmi of the Times of India gave it 2.5 out of five stars and wrote in her review, "The film does have a sweetness that grows on you and seasoned actors like Ram Kapoor and Madhoo add a dignity to their roles. The love birds Tusshar and Amrita are in sync with each other, but the film is so predictable and so long, it loses impact. Surely, a bit of reinvention is the need of the hour for Rajshri Inc too. After all, it's a fast and furious world we live in today.". Preeti Arora of Rediff found the movie unimpressive and wrote, "The Rajshri fans who thrive on old world love stories might just enjoy this. Simple and uncomplicated crafted in true Barjatya fashion. Or if you like the idea of Tusshar Kapoor in a lead romantic role. There aren't too many of these films being made these days. Thankfully!" Subhash K Jha of Bollywood Hungama wrote, "It is Harindranath Chattopadhyay who said, 'It's very difficult to be simple'. It takes a lot of guts to make a film as simple, honest and transparent as Love U...Mr Kalaakar in this day and age when Munni and Sheila are happily letting it all hang out and Ragini's love is lost in the lust and greed of an MMS mess."
