= Piya Kay Ghar Jana Hai =

Pakistani television drama

- Genre: Drama; Romance
- Written by: Syed Aatif Ali
- Directed by: Fahim Burney
- Starring: Karanvir Bohra; Cezanne Khan; Dipannita Sharma; Imran Abbas Naqvi
- Opening theme: Piya Ke Ghar Jaana Hai
- Country of origin: Pakistan
- Original languages: Urdu; Hindi
- No. of seasons: 1
- No. of episodes: TBA

Production
- Production locations: Dubai, Karachi
- Camera setup: Multi camera
- Running time: Approx. 22-24 Minutes

Original release
- Network: ARY Digital; Star Plus; Star Utsav
- Release: 2006 – 2007

Piya Kay Ghar Jaana Hai is a Pakistani drama which aired in 2006 on ARY Digital & on Star Plus in India .

== Cast ==
- Karanvir Bohra as Altaf
- Cezanne Khan
- Imran Abbas Naqvi as Amaan Ali
- Achint Kaur
- Dipannita Sharma
- Aman Verma
- Zainab Qayyum
- Wilmer Valderrama
