= Indian Telly Award for Best Actress in a Lead Role =

Annual television award

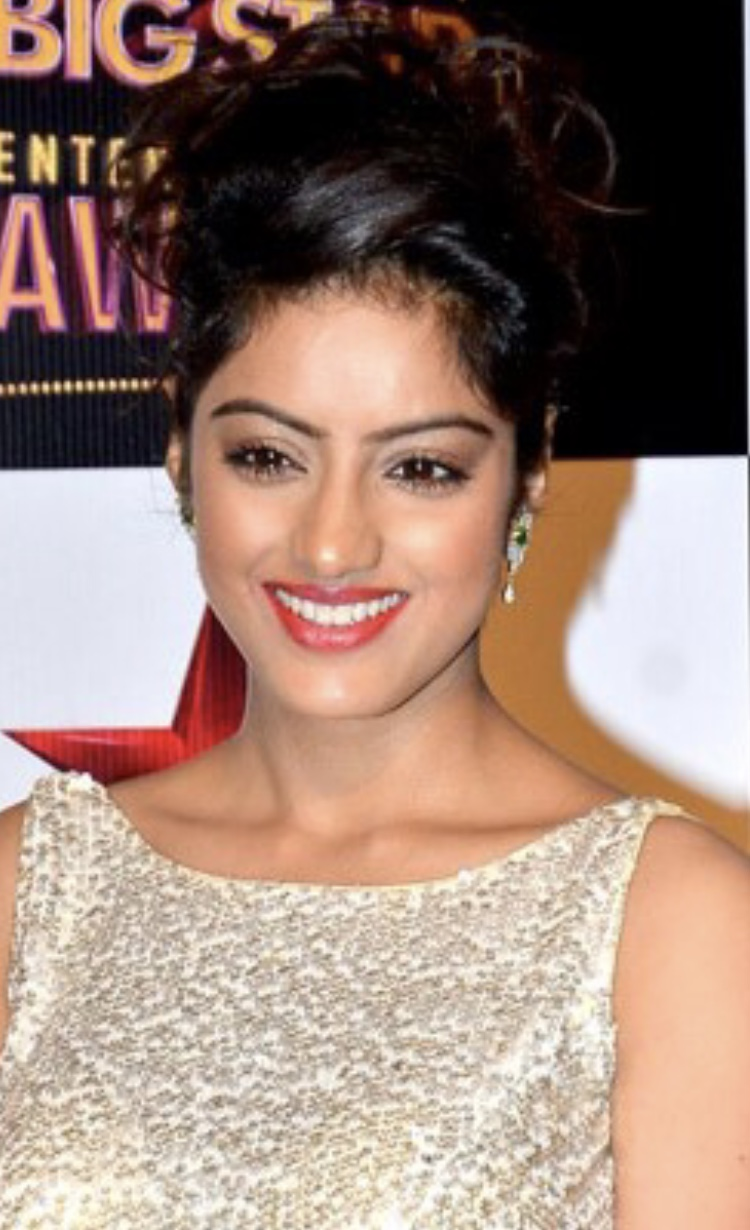
- Awarded for: Best performance by an actress in a leading role on television
- Country: India
- Presented by: Indian Television Dot Com
- First award: 2003
- Currently held by: Deepika Singh for Mangal Lakshmi as Mangal Srivastava Saxena (2025)
- Website: indiantellyawards.com

The Indian Telly Award for Best Actress in a Lead Role is an accolade presented annually by Indian Television Dot Com as part of the Indian Telly Awards. The award honours outstanding performances by actresses in leading roles on Indian television. Until 2012, it was presented without prior nominations, after which the process was modified to include a list of nominees decided by the jury panel.

== Winners ==
- 2003 – Shweta Tiwari for Kasautii Zindagii Kay as Prerna Bajaj
- 2005 – Juhi Parmar for Kumkum – Ek Pyara Sa Bandhan as Kumkum Wadhwa
- 2006 – Shweta Tiwari for Kasautii Zindagii Kay as Prerna Bajaj
- 2007 – Smriti Irani for Virrudh as Vasudha
- 2008 – Not awarded
- 2009 – Not awarded
- 2010 – Avika Gor for Balika Vadhu as Anandi Singh
- 2011 – Not awarded
- 2012 – Sakshi Tanwar for Bade Achhe Lagte Hain as Priya Kapoor
  - Ragini Khanna for Sasural Genda Phool as Suhana Kashyap
  - Shweta Tiwari for Parvarrish as Sweety Ahluwalia
  - Kritika Kamra for Kuch Toh Log Kahenge as Arohi
- 2013 – Surekha Sikri for Balika Vadhu as Kalyani Devi
  - Sonarika Bhadoria for Devon Ke Dev...Mahadev as Parvati
  - Nia Sharma for Ek Hazaaron Mein Meri Behna Hai as Manvi Vadhera
  - Harshita Ojha for Ek Veer Ki Ardaas...Veera as Veera Singh
  - Sakshi Tanwar for Bade Achhe Lagte Hain as Priya Kapoor
- 2014 – Jennifer Winget for Saraswatichandra as Kumud Desai
  - Surekha Sikri for Balika Vadhu as Kalyani Devi
  - Sakshi Tanwar for Bade Achhe Lagte Hain as Priya Kapoor
  - Mandira Bedi for 24 as Nikita Rai
  - Krystle D'Souza for Ekk Nayi Pehchaan as Sakshi Modi
- 2015 – Not awarded
- 2019 – Divyanka Tripathi for Yeh Hai Mohabbatein as Ishita Bhalla
  - Adaa Khan for Vish Ya Amrit: Sitara as Sitara
  - Aditi Sharma for Silsila Badalte Rishton Ka as Mauli Srivastav Khanna
  - Drashti Dhami for Silsila Badalte Rishton Ka as Nandani Malhotra
  - Shivangi Joshi for Yeh Rishta Kya Kehlata Hai as Naira Singhania
- 2023 – Rupali Ganguly for Anupamaa as Anupamaa
  - Ayesha Singh for Ghum Hai Kisikey Pyaar Meiin as Sai
  - Sushmita Mukherjee for Jagannath Aur Purvi Ki Dosti Anokhi as Kusum
  - Disha Parmar for Bade Achhe Lagte Hain 2 as Priya
  - Priyanka Chahar Choudhary for Udaariyaan as Tejo
  - Karuna Pandey for Pushpa Impossible as Pushpa
- 2025 – Deepika Singh for Mangal Lakshmi as Mangal Srivastava Saxena
  - Rupali Ganguly for Anupamaa as Anupamaa Joshi
  - Rutuja Bagwe for Maati Se Bandhi Dor as Vaijayanti
  - Sriti Jha for Kaise Mujhe Tum Mil Gaye as Amruta
  - Bharati Achrekar for Wagle Ki Duniya – Nayi Peedhi Naye Kissey as Radhika Wagle
