= Sartaj Gill =

Indian actor

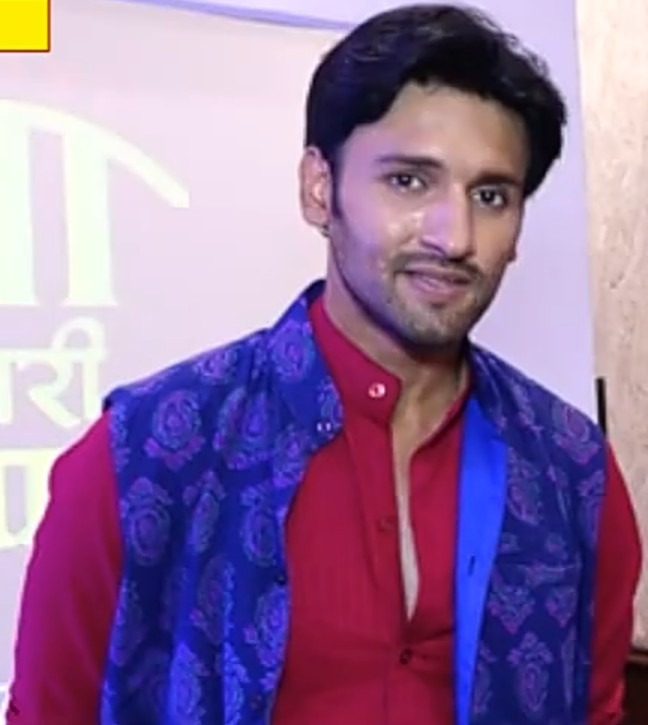
- Gill in 2019
- Born: Amritsar, Punjab
- Occupations: Actor, dancer
- Years active: 2011–present
- Known for: Begusarai

Sartaj Gill (sometimes spelled Sarrtaj Gill) is a former Indian television actor best known for portraying Priyom Thakur In Begusarai.

== Career ==
Gill started off career journey with the 2011 film Khap as Kush J. Mitter. He made his television debut in &TV's Begusarai playing Priyom Thakur in 2015.

From 2016 to 2017, he portrayed Raja/Raj/Kunwar Rajveer Singh on Zee TV's Ek Tha Raja Ek Thi Rani opposite Eisha Singh winning several awards.

In December 2018, he appeared in an episode of &TV's Laal Ishq playing Kishore Bagga opposite Neha Marda. Eight months later, Gill joined the cast of the same channel's comedy Gudiya Hamari Sabhi Pe Bhari as Muddhu Kandhele.

== Filmography ==
Year	Title	Role	Details	Notes
2011	Khap	Kush J. Mitter	Hindi language film	Film debut
2015-2016	Begusarai	Priyom Thakur	Television series	Television debut opposite Shweta Tiwari
2015	Killerr Karaoke Atka Toh Latkah	Himself	Television series	Television series
2016–2017	Ek Tha Raja Ek Thi Rani	Raja/Raj/Kunwar Rajveer Singh	Television series	Opposite Eisha Singh
2018	Laal Ishq	Kishore Bagga	Television series	Episodic role opposite Neha Marda
2019	Gudiya Hamari Sabhi Pe Bhari	Muddhu Kandhele	Television series	
