= Panch Kriti =

Panch Kriti Five Elements
- Directed by: Sannjoy Bhargv
- Story by: Haripriyaa Bharggav, Sannjoy Bhargv and Kumar Rakesh
- Produced by: Haripriyaa Bharggav, Sannjoy Bhargv
- Starring: Brijendra Kala; Tanmay Chaturvedi; Umesh Bajpai; Mahi Soni; Sagar Wahi; Devyani Chaubey; Purva Parag; Sarika Bahroliya; Ravi Chauhan
- Cinematography: Yogendra Tripathi
- Edited by: Sunil Yadav, Arun D.Yadav
- Production company: Ubon Vision Pvt Ltd
- Release date: 25 August 2023
- Running time: 124 mins
- Country: India
- Language: Hindi

Panch Kriti Five Elements is a 2023 Indian Hindi-language drama film, written and directed by Sannjoy Bhargv and produced by Haripriyaa Bharggav and Sannjoy Bhargv under the banner of Ubon Vision Pvt Ltd. The film stars Brijendra Kala, Umesh Bajpai, Sagar Wahi, Purva Parag, Mahi Soni and Ravi Chauhan will also be seen in the film. It was theatrically released on 25 August 2023.

== Synopsis ==
Panch Kriti Five Elements is a film consisting of five interconnected stories set in the town of Chanderi. Through a unique blend of storytelling, each story stands alone while also being intertwined by a common thread.

== Cast ==
- Brijendra Kala as Pandit Ji
- Tanmay Chaturvedi as Mukesh
- Umesh Bajpai as Morya Ji
- Kurangi Nagraj as Sakhi
- Mahi Soni as Mahi
- Sagar Wahi as Sunny
- Devyani Chaubey as Ratna
- Purva Parag as Kusum
- Ravi Chauhan as Rajani's father
- Sarika Bahroliya as Rajani
