= Kyaa Hoga Nimmo Kaa =

- Written by: Dialogues; Aslam Parvez; Nilesh Rupapara
- Screenplay by: Vipul Mehta
- Story by: Vipul Mehta
- Directed by: Ravindra Gautam
- Creative director: Nivedita Basu
- Starring: See below
- Opening theme: "Kyaa Hoga Nimmo Kaa" by Shreya Ghoshal
- Country of origin: India
- Original language: Hindi
- No. of episodes: 176

Production
- Producers: Ekta Kapoor; Shobha Kapoor
- Cinematography: Santosh Suryavanshi
- Editors: Vikas Sharma; Sandeep Bhatt
- Running time: 24 minutes
- Production company: Balaji Telefilms

Original release
- Network: Star One
- Release: 20 March 2006 – 18 January 2007

Kyaa Hoga Nimmo Kaa (transl. What will happen to Nimmo) is an Indian comedy-drama television series produced by Balaji Telefilms that aired on Star One.

== Story ==
The series follows Nimmo, a girl from a middle-class family, and the twists and turns in her life. Luck has never favoured this sweet and charming girl and she is often found to end up in circumstances which create much havoc. She still managed to remain fun-loving, confident and always had a positive approach towards life. Nimmo is very content and satisfied with whatever she does in life and whatever she has with herself. She shares a very strange relationship with God and together they share an extremely complex understanding. She is often found to be conversing with God and blaming Him for whatever happens in her life. Nimmo seems to accept her hard luck with high spirits until Kya Hoga Nimmo Ka takes a major turn and she falls in love with Vikrant (Sanjeet Bedi) who seems to be more interested in her sister.

Meanwhile, Nimmo happens to meet Kunal Sehgal (Eijaz Khan). Kunal is from a very well-to-do family and is a playboy by reputation. A contractual marriage bonds them to each other and her life takes a complete turn when she is married to him. This turn is not only a surprise to her family but also to everyone else except Kanta Masi who is her confidante. But there is more to this marriage than that meets the eye. Ultimately Nimmo, with her poise and conduct, is able to manage everyone in the Sehgal household. Kunal's love interest Natasha becomes a major issue and Nimmo shifts away. It was late for Kunal to realize that he has fallen in love with Nimmo, but he manages to woo her back.

== Cast ==
- Sanjeeda Sheikh as Namrata "Nimmo" Sehgal
- Eijaz Khan as Kunal Sehgal
- Kavita Kaushik / Jennifer Winget as Natasha
- Tina Chaudhary as Swati Mathuria
- Anas Rashid as Karan Sehgal
- Dara Singh as Amardeep Sehgal
- Dolly Thakore as Preet Sehgal
- Garima Bhatnagar / Barkha Bisht as Naina Mathuria, Nimmo's sister
- Navneet Nishan as Parminder Sehgal
- Ansha Sayed as Riti Sehgal
- Sanjeet Bedi as Vikrant
- Sandeep Baswana as Palash
- Bharti Achrekar as Kanta Maasi
- Gautam Chaturvedi as Mr. Sehgal
- Navjot Singh Sidhu as God
- Sujata Mehta as Namrata's mother
- Karan Wahi as Ranveer
- Amit Divetia as Bagwanji Bhai
- Nitin Trivedi
- Bakul Thakkar
- shubhangi gokhale nimmos aunty
