= Sarika Bahroliya =

Actress

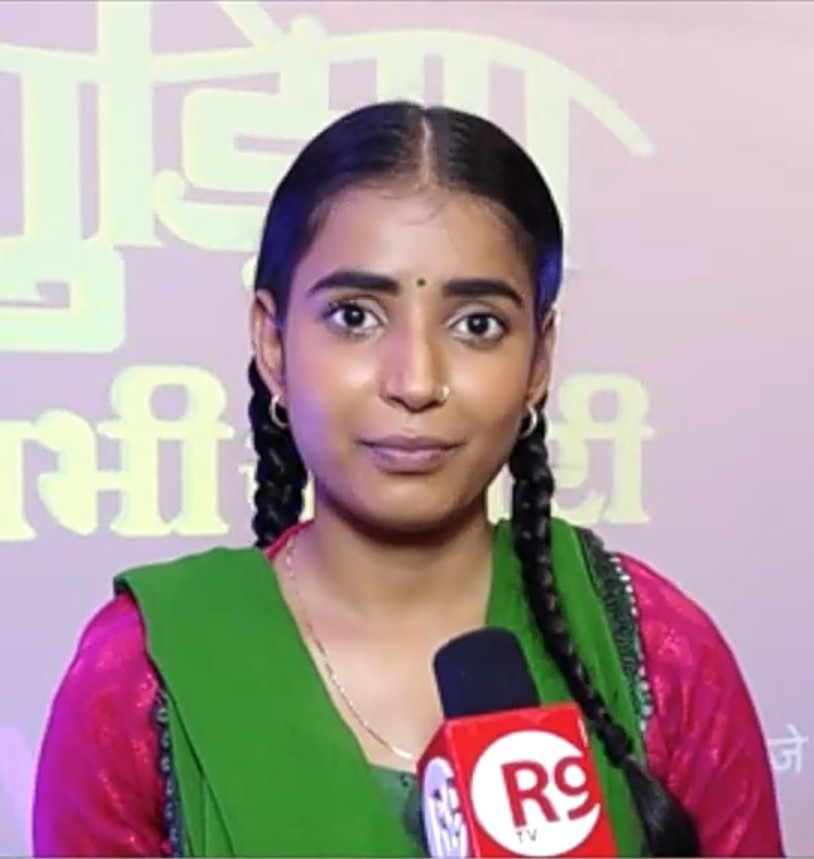
- Born: December 19, 1999 (age 26); Gwalior, Madhya Pradesh, India
- Education: Raja Mansingh Tomar Music & Arts University
- Occupation: Actress
- Years active: 2019 – present
- Known for: Gudiya Hamari Sabhi Pe Bhari

Sarika Bahroliya is an Indian actress best known for her prominent work in television. She gained recognition starring in the &TV comedy-drama sitcom Gudiya Hamari Sabhi Pe Bhari (2019–2021), where she played the lead role of Pratibha Gupta (affectionately known as Gudiya), a goofy and free-spirited girl, as well as a secondary look-alike character named Jhumri. In addition to her successful television run, she expanded her acting career to the silver screen, appearing in the 2023 Bollywood feature film Panch Kriti.

== Filmography ==
=== Television ===
Year	Title	Role	Notes	Ref.
2019–2021	Gudiya Hamari Sabhi Pe Bhari	Pratibha Gupta, Gudiya, Jhumri	Lead	

=== Film ===
Year	Title	Role	Notes	Ref.
2022	Ghodi Pe Hoke Sawar	Pinky	Lead (Short film)	
2023	Panch Kriti	Rajani	Lead	

== External link ==
- Sarika Bahroliya at IMDb
