= Anuj Pandit Sharma =

Indian film and television actor (born 1991)

Anujj Anil Sharrma
- Born: 1991/10/21; Mumbai
- Occupation: Actor
- Years active: 1999–present
- Known for: Bittu Sardar in Koi...Mil Gaya, Sunny from Aadat se Majboor, Jogi From Parvarish Season 2

Anujj Anil Sharma is an Indian actor, who works in Hindi films and television. He is known for his role in Koi... Mil Gaya and as Jogi from Parvarrish - Season 2.

== Biography ==
Anujj Anil Sharrma started acting in a television serial titled Apun Toh Bas Vaise Hi co-starring Satish Shah before starring in Koi... Mil Gaya (2003). He played a Sikh child named Bittu in both the serial and the film. He played Yami Gautam's brother in Total Siyappa (2014). He started his own singing career with his first single with Zee Music Company (2024) called Meri Heeriyyee.

== Filmography ==
=== Television ===
Year	Show	Role
2001	Apun Toh Bas Vaise Hi	Bittu
2005	Hero - Bhakti Hi Shakti Hai	Sadashiv
	Hukum Mere Aaka	Jinny
	Crime Patrol	Vijay Tripathi
2015–2016	Parvarrish - Season 2	Joginder 'Jogi' Kulwinder Khurrana
	Bacchon Ki Adaalat	Child advocate
2017–2018	Aadat Se Majboor	Sunny

=== Film ===
Year	Title	Role	Ref.
2003	Darna Mana Hai	Varun	
2003	Koi... Mil Gaya	Bittu	
2007	Say Salaam India	Gurvinder	
2014	Total Siyappa	Manav Singh	

=== Web series ===
Year	Title	Role	Note
2021	Bamini and Boys	Utpal	Disney+ Hotstar
