= Seeta Aur Geeta (TV series) =

- Created by: Sunil Bohra
- Based on: Seeta Aur Geeta by Salim–Javed
- Directed by: Maqbool Khan
- Starring: See below
- Country of origin: India
- Original language: Hindi
- No. of seasons: 8
- No. of episodes: 90

Production
- Producer: Sunil Bohra
- Running time: 24 minutes

Original release
- Network: NDTV Imagine
- Release: 25 May – 25 September 2009

Seeta Aur Geeta (transl. Seeta and Geeta) is an Indian television drama series that aired on NDTV Imagine. It was adapted from the Bollywood film of the same name (1972), written by Salim–Javed. The series was produced by Sunil Bohra and directed by Maqbool Khan. It aired on NDTV Imagine from 25 May 2009 to 25 September 2009.

== Plot ==
Set against the backdrop of Mumbai, Seeta and Geeta are daughters of rich parents who were separated as children. The family's maid had run off with Geeta. She grows in the middle class as the maid's daughter and becomes a bully. Seeta grows in the loving care of her parents and becomes an introvert. When her parents die in an accident, evil relatives take over her family fortune and treat her like maid.

Chaos ensues when Seeta and Geeta come face to face. They decide to exchange places. Geeta takes revenge from evil relatives posing as Seeta and Seeta lives simple life in the streets while falling in love with Seeta's thug friend Raka.

== Cast ==
Actor	Character
Anjori Alagh	Seeta and Geeta (double role)
Gaurav Dixit	Raka
Cezanne Khan	Ravi
Rituraj Singh	Seeta's chacha
Sushmita Mukherjee	Manorama Geeta's chachi
Honey Chhaya	Ramu.
Sulabha Arya	Seeta's grandmother who supports her.

=== Guest appearance ===
- Shweta Tiwari as Raka's dream girl

== Production ==
Initially planned for 260 episodes, it ultimately ended with only 90 episodes.

Rahil Azam was originally cast as Raka, one of the lead characters. A few episodes were produced with Azam in the role, but two months before the premiere he was suffering from malaria and was replaced by Gaurav Dixit. Azam's sequences were re-shot with Dixit before the premiere.
