= Parvarrish =

2011 Indian television series

- Also known as: Parvarrish
- Genre: Indian soap opera
- Written by: Satyam Tripathy, Bijesh Jayrajan, Dilip Jha, Archita Biswas Jha and S. Manasvi
- Directed by: Imtiaz Punjabi, khalid Akhtar
- Creative director: Sonalika Bhonsle
- Starring: See below
- Opening theme: Shaan and Shankar Mahadevan
- Country of origin: India
- Original language: Hindi
- No. of seasons: 2
- No. of episodes: 388

Production
- Producers: Deeya Singh; Tony Singh
- Cinematography: Mahesh R. Gupta
- Editor: Hemantt Kumarr
- Camera setup: Multi-camera
- Running time: 23 minutes
- Production company: DJ's a Creative Unit

Original release
- Network: Sony Entertainment Television
- Release: 21 November 2011 – 14 August 2013

Related
- Parvarrish - Season 2

Parvarrish is an Indian soap opera that aired on Sony TV. The show premiered on 21 November 2011 and ended on 14 August 2013. The serial is about two families having different ways of raising their kids. The story focuses on the lives, morals, and rituals of the families.

== Plot summary ==
Parvarrish primarily revolves around two families who are relatives: the Ahluwalias and the Ahujas. It focuses on the troubles they go through in bringing up their children and the lessons they learn from these experiences.

Sweety Ahluwalia is very strict with her children, Rocky and Ginny, to the point where they get frustrated with her and secretly rebel. Although she constantly scolds them and complains about their studies, she considers them her life. With her supportive husband Lakvir Singh, she tries to provide them with the best she can.

On the other hand, Sweety's younger sister, Pinky Ahuja, wants to take care of her children, Raavi, Raashi and Sunny by being friends with them. However, her overreacting nature often suffocates her kids and creates problems in the relationship she shares with them. She often finds a supportive friend in her caring and loving husband Jeet.

== Cast ==
Ahluwalia Family

- Shweta Tiwari as Sweety Kaur Khanna Ahluwalia – Rajesh's elder daughter; Pinky and Lovely's sister; Lucky's wife; Rocky and Ginni's mother; Raavi, Rashi and Sunny's aunt. (2011-2013)
- Vivek Mushran as Lakhmeet "Lucky" Singh Ahluwalia – Bebe's son; Sweety's husband; Rocky and Ginni's father; Raavi, Rashi and Sunny's uncle. (2011-2013)
- Tapasvi Mehta as Rakvinder "Rocky" Singh Ahluwalia – Sweety and Lucky's son; Ginni's brother; Raavi, Rashi and Sunny's cousin. (2011-2013)
- Aashika Bhatia as Gunwant "Ginni" Kaur Ahluwalia – Sweety and Lucky's daughter; Rocky's sister; Raavi, Rashi and Sunny's cousin.(2011-2013)

Ahuja Family

- Rupali Ganguly as Pinky Kaur Khanna Ahuja – Rajesh's younger daughter; Sweety and Lovely's sister; Jeet's wife; Raavi, Rashi and Sunny's mother; Rocky and Ginni's aunt. (2011–2013)
  - Barkha Sengupta as Pinky Kaur Khanna Ahuja (2013)
- Vishal Singh as Jeet Ahuja – Pinky's husband; Raavi, Rashi and Sunny's father; Rocky and Ginni's uncle. (2011-2013)
- Aanchal Munjal as Raavi Ahuja – Pinky and Jeet's elder daughter; Rashi and Sunny's sister; Rocky and Ginni's cousin. (2011-2013)
- Sparsh Khanchandani as Rashi Ahuja – Pinky and Jeet's younger daughter; Raavi and Sunny's sister; Rocky and Ginni's cousin. (2011-2013)
- Rakshit Wahi as Sundesh ‘Sunny’ Ahuja – Pinky and Jeet's son; Raavi and Rashi's brother; Rocky and Ginni's cousin. (2011-2013)

Khanna Family

- Rajesh Puri as Rajesh Singh Khanna – Sweety, Pinky and Lovely's father; Rocky, Raavi, Ginni, Rashi and Sunny's grandfather (2011-2013)
- Vivek Madan as Lovely Singh Khanna – Rajesh's son; Pinky and Sweety's brother; Dolly's husband (2011-2013)
- Namrata Ramsay as Dolly Kaur Khanna – Lovely's wife (2011-2013)

Others

- Unknown as Bebe/Mrs. Ahluwalia – Lucky's mother; Rocky and Ginni's grandmother
- Raju Kher as Senior Mr. Ahluwalia – Lucky's father; Rocky and Ginni's grandfather
- Samara as Aishwarya Soonawaala – Rocky's Classmate/Friend
- Anshul Pandey as Siddarth Rastogi a.k.a. Siddhu/Sid – Ahuja's Neighbor
- Jiten Lalwani as Monty Sood – Lucky's Childhood Friend (Fraud)
- Gaurav Nanda as Amit Kapoor
- Abhishek Bajaj as Nithin Mehta – Raavi's crush
- Param Singh as Yudhishthir "Yudi" Sharma – Mandira's son; Rocky's friend
- Kamya Panjabi as Mandira Sharma – Yudi's mother
- Ranvierr Chahal as Vicky
- Ayaz Ahmed as Aarav Sengupta
- Aashish Kaul as Bharat Sharma
- Prashant Ranyal as Siddarth Mathur
- Vaishnavi Dhanraj as Meera Siddart Mathur
- Kishwer Merchant as Parminder (Pam) – Ahuja's Neighbor
- Eshaan Sahney as Dev Sawhney
- Aman Verma as Advocate Raghav Jaitley (RJ)
- Mahip Marwah
- Payal Bhojwani as Payal – Ginni's Classmate
- Unknown as Koyal – Ginni's Classmate
- Unknown as Deejay Khurana – Raavi's Stalker (Eve Teaser)
- Unknown as Mrs. Khurana – Deejay's Mother
- Unknown as Mr. Khurana – Deejay's Father
- Siddharth Sen as Raj Tyagi – Ginni's Music Teacher
- Anoop Gautam as Football Coach
- Athar Siddiqui as Kapil – Games Teacher
- Mona Ambegaonkar as Miss Mini Mehtab – Theater Artist

Guest appearances from Saas Bina Sasural

- Ravi Dubey as Tejprakash "Tej" Chatuvedi
- Aishwarya Sakhuja as Tanya "Toasty" Sharma Chaturvedi
- Darshan Jariwala as Cheddilal Chaturvedi
- Arvind Vaidya as Anandilal Chaturvedi
- Rajendra Chawla as Pashupatinath Chaturvedi
- Rohini Banerjee as Maalti Chaturvedi
- Rishi Khurana as Vedprakash "Ved" Chaturvedi
- Shruti Bapna as Nitika Chaturvedi
- Shraman Jain as Pracheenprakash "Pracheen" Chaturvedi
- Meghan Jadhav as Gyanprakash "Gyan" Chaturvedi

== Sequel ==
In May 2015, it was announced that the show would return with a sequel. In September 2015, it was announced that actors like Sangita Ghosh, Sandeep Baswana, Vinay Jain and Gautami Kapoor would star in the sequel. The sequel began from 23 November 2015 and ended on 7 July 2016.

== Awards and nominations ==
- Indian Telly Awards 2012
  - Best Child Artist (Female) - Aanchal Munjal
  - Best Ensemble Cast
- ITA 2012
  - Best Actress (Jury) - Shweta Tiwari
  - Best Serial (Jury)
  - Best Direction
- Kalakr Awards 2013
  - Best Actress (Jury) - Shweta Tiwari & Rupali Ganguly
- Indian Telly Awards 2013
  - Best Actress (Jury) - Shweta Tiwari

== See also ==
- List of programs broadcast by Sony Entertainment Television
