= Jaane Kya Baat Hui =

- Genre: Drama
- Developed by: Sharad Raj
- Written by: Charudutt Acharya
- Directed by: Mukul Abyankar
- Creative directors: Amitabh Raina & Sonal Sonarikar
- Starring: See below
- Country of origin: India
- Original language: Hindi
- No. of seasons: 1
- No. of episodes: 198

Production
- Executive producer: Manoj Sharma
- Producers: Prem Krishen & Sunil Mehta
- Cinematography: Mahesh R. Gupta
- Editor: Randhir Afzal
- Camera setup: Multi-camera
- Running time: approximately 24 minutes
- Production company: Vision Time India Private Limited

Original release
- Network: Colors TV; Surya TV; Sun TV
- Release: 1 December 2008 – 5 June 2009

Jaane Kya Baat Hui (transl. Don't Know What Happened) is an Indian television series which premiered on Colors TV on 1 December 2008. It replaced the reality show Bigg Boss which ended on 22 November 2008. It starred Shweta Tiwari and Sanjeet Bedi in the leads.

== Plot ==
The story takes off after 10 years of Aradhna's marriage to Shailendra Sareen. Everybody loves her, except for Brinda, Bharat's wife. Brinda wants her status in the family to strengthened and to also have a part of the property of her share; (for her children Sagar and Simran) The show deals with the extramarital affairs of Shailendra-; And him never loving/finding time to spend with Aradhna. Sameera, a girl who worked with Shailendra as his new secretary, and he continuously started to have a secret affair with her, even while Aradhna was working with him in the office. Unfortunately Aradhna witnessed one of the moments with Sameera and Shailendra and totally broke up. Finally, in greed, Shailendra agrees to always maintain his relationship with Aradhna and not betray her by making relationships with women that he employs. Unfortunately, one day an evil woman named Raveena decides to dupe Shailendra into her charms and turn him against Aradhna to gain his full trust to gain his property and business. Shailendra, who was blindfolded by Raveena, lent her money to buy a flat of her own (because at the time she was staying in a hotel), and she lied to Shailendra that she had financial problems. Meanwhile, Shantanu (the Sareens' family friend), and Chandar (Shailendra's elder brother), plotted many plans to eliminate Raveena from Shailendra's life. A few of these plans were not successful. Unfortunately Sanjana and Vrinda was also sided with Raveena just for the money and their side of the property. They never managed to realise the importance of Aradhna in the Sareen house, therefore never learnt their lesson.

In the end Aradhna achieves her goal (to get Shailendra out of Raveena's clutches), and Shailendra is sorry for his unacceptable actions. Aradhna does not forgive Shailendra fully, but instead says that if he was treated in the same way that she was, how would he feel, and the serial ended on a puzzling note.

== Cast ==
=== Main cast ===
- Shweta Tiwari as Aradhana Sareen
- Sanjeet Bedi as Shailendra Sareen

=== Recurring cast ===
- Rupal Patel as Vrinda Bharat Sareen
- Rajendra Chawla as Bharat Sareen
- Shishir Sharma as Jawahar Sareen
- Abhinav Kohli as Akshay Sareen
- Ami Trivedi as Sanjana Akshay Sareen
- Abhinav Shukla as Shantanu Agnihotri
- Tapeshwari Sharma as Simran Sareen
- Aparna Kumar as Raveena Anand
- Lucky Raajput as Inspector Khan
- Vimal
- Sundar C
- Jaswinder Gardner
- Parinita Seth
- Vikram Sahu
