= Indian Telly Award for Best Television Personality of the Year =

Indian performing arts award

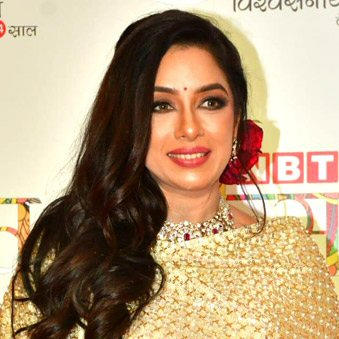
- The 2025 recipient: Rupali Ganguly
- Awarded for: Best contribution of an anchor/host/actor/presenter/professional to television
- Country: India
- Presented by: IndianTelevision.com
- First award: 2001
- Website: Indian Telly Awards

Indian Telly Award for Best Television Personality of the Year is an award given by Indiantelevision.com as part of its annual Indian Telly Awards for TV serials, to recognize a television anchor/host/actor/presenter/professional who overshadowed all his peers either on the screen or off it leaving an indelible mark/stamp during the year and have consistently topped in terms of impact, visibility, acceptability. He/she could have remarkably improved the viewership of a channel or programme by his/her unique presence.

The award was first awarded in 2001 to Bollywood actor Amitabh Bachchan for hosting popular reality show Kaun Banega Crorepati. Most of the time, the winner is announced out of nominations, but sometimes the award is given without nominations. In 2007, 2009 and 2010, the award was awarded with different titles. Only once, in 2012, the award was given separately to a male and female personality.

== List of winners ==
=== 2001-2009 ===
- 2001
  Amitabh Bachchan
- 2002
  Cezanne Khan
  - Prannoy Roy
  - Harsha Bhogle
  - Vir Sanghvi
  - Rajdeep Sardesai
  - Amitabh Bachchan
  - Navjot Singh Sidhu
  - Shekhar Suman
- 2003
  Smriti Irani
- 2004
  Rajeev Khandelwal & Mona Singh
  - Hiten Tejwani
  - Niki Aneja Walia
  - Mandira Bedi
- 2005
  Rajeev Khandelwal
  - Ronit Roy
  - Abhijeet Sawant
  - Shekhar Suman
- 2006
  Ronit Roy
  - Javed Jaffrey
  - Rajdeep Sardesai
  - Navjot Singh Sidhu
- 2007
  Hussain Kuwajerwala (Style Icon of the Year)
  - Ronit Roy
  - Rajeev Khandelwal
  - Rajdeep Sardesai
- 2008
  Akshay Kumar
  - Salman Khan
  - Shilpa Shetty
  - Saroj Khan
  - Parul Chauhan
  - Sara Khan
  - Shahrukh Khan
  - Shaan
- 2009
  Rani Mukerji (TV Ki Rani Award)

=== 2010-2019 ===
- 2010
  Ronit Roy (10th Anniversary Special Award for TV Star of the Decade)
- 2011
  No Award
- 2012
  Ronit Roy (Male) and Ankita Lokhande (Female)
  - Barun Sobti
  - Pratyusha Banerjee
  - Gia Manek
- 2013
  Karan Singh Grover
- 2014
  Rohit Shetty
- 2015
  Divyanka Tripathi
- 2016
  Not Awarded
- 2017
  Not Awarded
- 2018
  Not Awarded
- 2019
  Divyanka Tripathi

=== 2020-present ===
- 2023
  Shaheer Sheikh
- 2025
  Rupali Ganguly
