= Shweta Tiwari =

Indian actress (born 1980)

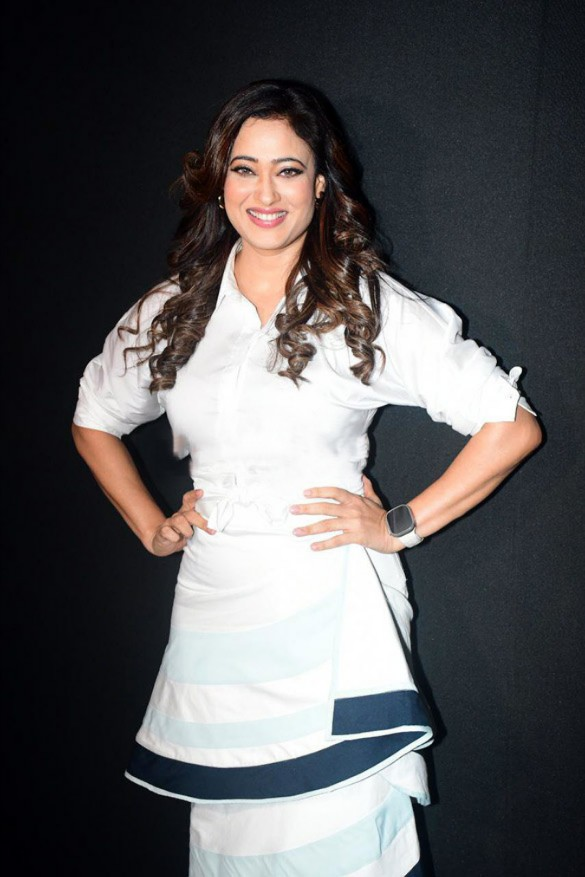
- Tiwari in 2024
- Born: 4 October 1980 (age 46); Pratapgarh, Uttar Pradesh, India
- Occupations: Actress; model
- Years active: 1999–present
- Known for: Kasautii Zindagii Kay; Bigg Boss 4
- Spouses: Raja Chaudhary (m. 1998; div. 2012) Abhinav Kohli (m. 2013; sep. 2019)
- Children: 2 (including Palak)
- Awards: Full list

Shweta Tiwari (pronounced [ˈʃʋeːt̪a t̪ɪˈʋaːɾi]; born 4 October 1980) is an Indian actress who primarily works in Hindi television. One of the highest paid television actress, Tiwari is widely known for her portrayal of Prerna Sharma in Star Plus daily soap opera Kasautii Zindagii Kay. In 2010, she participated in Bigg Boss 4 and emerged as the winner, thus becoming the first female winner of the series.Other reality shows to her credit include Nach Baliye, Jhalak Dikhhla Jaa 6, Fear Factor: Khatron Ke Khiladi Season 11 and The Traitors India.

Tiwari has also worked in several other television shows and is known for portraying Sweety Ahluwalia in Sony TV's Parvarrish, Bindiya Thakur in & TV's Begusarai, Guneet Sikka Sharma in Mere Dad Ki Dulhan and Aparajita Singh in Main Hoon Aparajita also on Sony TV.

== Life and family ==
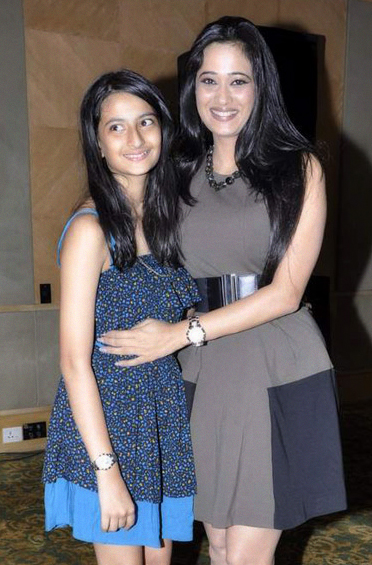
Tiwari and her daughter Palak, in 2012

Tiwari was born on 4 October 1980 in Pratapgarh, Uttar Pradesh.

Tiwari married actor Raja Chaudhary in 1998 and they have a daughter Palak Tiwari, born on 8 October 2000. She filed for a divorce in 2007 after nine years of marriage. Tiwari reported she suffered a troubled relationship characterised by Chaudhary's alcoholism and domestic violence. She complained that he used to beat her up daily. He used to turn up on the sets of her shows and misbehave with her. Their divorce was granted in 2012.

Tiwari and actor Abhinav Kohli married on 13 July 2013 after dating for three years. On 27 November 2016, Tiwari gave birth to their son Reyansh Kohli. Reports of problems in their marriage first emerged in 2017. In August 2019, she filed a complaint of domestic violence against Kohli alleging harassment by him towards her and her daughter. Kohli was taken into police custody. Tiwari and Kohli separated in 2019.

== Career ==
Tiwari made her acting debut in 2000 with Aane Wala Pal. She then had her career breakthrough with Kasautii Zindagii Kay, which is her most notable work. From 2001 to 2008, she portrayed Prerna Sharma opposite Cezanne Khan, Hiten Tejwani and Ronit Roy. The series was a success and won her several awards and nominations including two Indian Telly Award for Best Actress in a Lead Role.

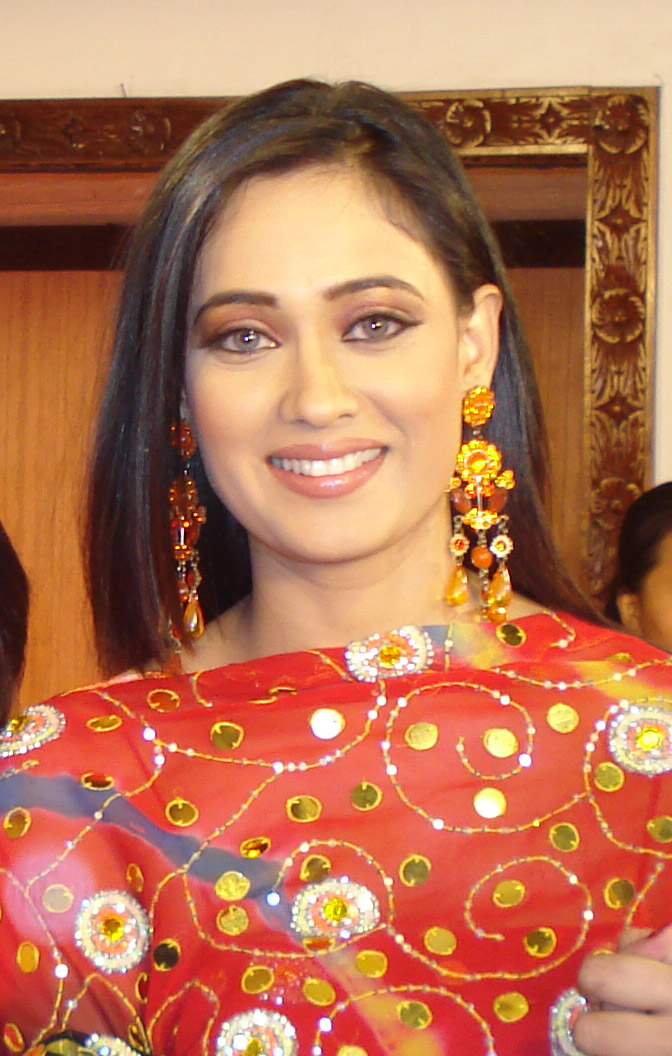
Tiwari on the sets of Trinetra, in 2009

Tiwari then went onto appear in several Hindi, Bhojpuri and other languages films. Some of these include: Aabra Ka Daabra (2004), Hamar Sayian Hindustani (2008), Apni Boli Apna Des (2009) and Bin Bulaye Baraati (2011). In 2014, Tiwari also appeared in the Pakistani film Sultanat.

Tiwari participated in Bigg Boss 4 and emerged as the winner of the show, thus becoming the first female winner of the reality show. Following this, Tiwari portrayed Sweety Kaur Khanna Ahluwalia in Parvarrish – Kuchh Khattee Kuchh Meethi opposite Vivek Mushran, Bindiya "Maa Thakurain" Thakur in Begusarai opposite Sarrtaj Gill, Guneet Sikka Sharma in Mere Dad Ki Dulhan opposite Varun Badola and Aparajita Singh in Main Hoon Aparajita opposite Manav Gohil. Her performance in Kasautii Zindagii Kay, Parvarrish – Kuchh Khattee Kuchh Meethi, Begusarai and Mere Dad Ki Dulhan earned her five ITA Award for Best Actress – Jury.

Tiwari made her web debut in 2019 with Hum Tum And Them. In 2024, she appeared in the series Indian Police Force as a police officer's wife opposite Vivek Oberoi. Trisha Bhattacharya of India Today stated, "Despite her brief presence, Tiwari unquestionably made a lasting impression." In the same year, she played a police officer in the film Singham Again. A box office success, it emerged as the seventh highest-grossing Indian film of the year. A critic of Bollywood Hungama found her "memorable" in her role.

== In the media ==
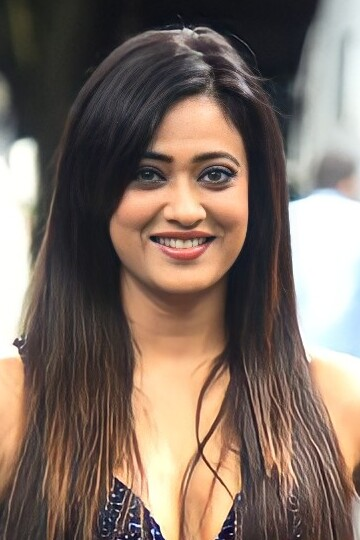
Tiwari in 2021

Tiwari is considered among the highest–paid television actresses. She has been termed as one of the hottest television actress by Rediff.com. Her character Prerna Sharma is recognised among the strongest female characters on television. In 2023, she ranked 1st in Times Now "Popular Television Actresses" list.

== Filmography ==
Key
†	Denotes films that have not yet been released

=== Films ===
Year	Title	Role	Language	Notes	Ref.
2004	Madhoshi	Tabbasum	Hindi		
2004	Aabra Ka Daabra	Shivani R. Singh	Hindi		
2008	Trinetra	Unknown	Nepali		
2008	Hamar Sayian Hindustani	Radha	Bhojpuri		
2008	Kab Aibu Anganwa Hamar	Naina	Bhojpuri		
2009	Ae Bhouji Ke Sister	Unknown	Bhojpuri		
2009	Apni Boli Apna Des	Satkar Kaur	Punjabi		
2009	Devru	Unknown	Kannada	Cameo appearance	
2010	Benny and Babloo	Sheena	Hindi		
2011	Bin Bulaye Baraati	Rajjo / Rosie	Hindi		
2011	Miley Naa Miley Hum	Herself	Hindi	Special appearance in a song	
2012	Married 2 America	Mrs. Singh	Hindi		
2012	Yedyanchi Jatra	Bakula	Marathi	Special appearance in a song	
2014	Sultanat		Urdu	Pakistani film	
2023	Mitran Da Naa Chalda	Advocate Indu Mittal	Punjabi		
2023	The Purple Scarf	Devyani	Hindi	Short film	
2024	Singham Again	ACP Devika Singh	Hindi		
2026	The Vvaan: Force of the Forrest	Sushila Kumar	Hindi		

=== Television ===
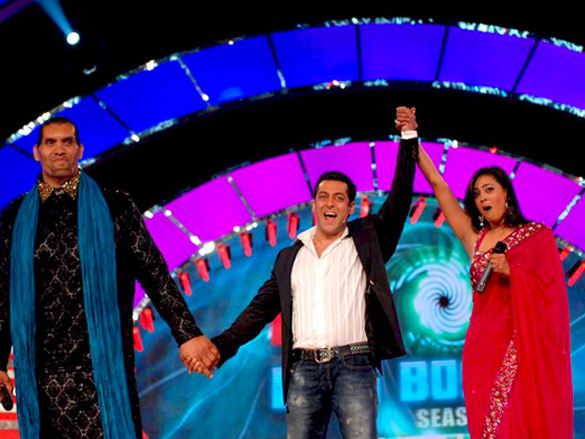
Tiwari's Bigg Boss 4 winning moment

Year	Title	Role	Notes	Ref.
2000	Aane Wala Pal			
2001	Kaleerein			
2001	Karam			
2001	Kaahin Kissii Roz	Anita		
2001–2008	Kasautii Zindagii Kay	Prerna Sharma / Prerna Basu / Prerna Bajaj	Main role	
2002	Kya Hadsaa Kya Haqeeqat	Sunita Menon		
2005	Dost	Mashal	Pakistani serial	
2006	Nach Baliye 2	Contestant	6th place	
2007	Jjhoom India	Contestant		
2007	Naaginn	Queen Surmaya		
2008	Jalwa Four 2 Ka 1	Contestant		
2008–2009	Jaane Kya Baat Hui	Aradhna Sareen	Main role	
2009	Iss Jungle Se Mujhe Bachao	Contestant		
2009	Jhalak Dikhhla Jaa 3	Host		
2009	Aaja Mahii Vayy	Judge		
2010–2011	Bigg Boss 4	Contestant	Winner	
2011	Comedy Circus Ka Naya Daur	Contestant	Winner	
2011–2013	Parvarrish – Kuchh Khattee Kuchh Meethi	Sweety Kaur Khanna Ahluwalia	Main role	
2012–2015	Rangoli	Host		
2013	Ek Thhi Naayka	Juhi	Main role	
2013	Jhalak Dikhhla Jaa 6	Contestant	12th place	
2014	Baal Veer	Mahabhasm Pari		
2015–2016	Begusarai	Bindiya "Maa Thakurain" Thakur	Main role	
2019–2020	Mere Dad Ki Dulhan	Guneet Sikka Sharma	Main role	
2021	Fear Factor: Khatron Ke Khiladi 11	Contestant	5th place	
2022–2023	Main Hoon Aparajita	Aparajita Singh	Main role	
2024	Aapka Apna Zakir	Shweta Tiwari		

==== Special appearances ====
Year	Title	Role	Ref.
2002	Kumkum – Ek Pyara Sa Bandhan	Prerna Sharma	
2003	Kyunki Saas Bhi Kabhi Bahu Thi	Prerna Sharma	
2003	Khichdi	Prerna Sharma	
2004	Kahaani Ghar Ghar Kii	Prerna Sharma	
2004	Kahiin to Hoga	Prerna Sharma	
2005	Kesar	Prerna Sharma	
2005	Kkavyanjali	Prerna Sharma	
2006	Kandy Floss	Herself	
2006	Karam Apnaa Apnaa	Prerna Bajaj	
2007	Kasturi	Prerna Bajaj	
2007	Kayamath	Prerna Bajaj	
2008	Raja Ki Aayegi Baraat	Prerna Sharma	
2008	Kis Desh Mein Hai Meraa Dil	Prerna Sharma	
2008	Sapna Babul Ka... Bidaai	Prerna Sharma	
2008	Ajeeb		
2009	Seeta Aur Geeta	Raka's dream girl	
2011	Adaalat	Revati Amrit Nagpal	
2011	Sajan Re Jhoot Mat Bolo	ACP Archana	
2011	Bigg Boss 5	Herself	
2012	Bigg Boss 6	Herself	
2013–2015	Comedy Nights with Kapil	Various Characters	
2014	Mad In India	Herself	
2020	India's Best Dancer	Guneet Sikka	
2021	Dance Deewane 3	Herself	
2022	Bigg Boss 15	Herself	
2022	Bhabhi Ke Pyaare Pritam Hamare	Herself	

=== Web series ===
Year	Title	Role	Notes	Ref.
2019	Hum Tum And Them	Shiva		
2024	Womaniya			
2024	Indian Police Force	Shruti Bakshi		
2025	Do You Wanna Partner	Laila Singh		
2026	The Traitors India season 2	Contestant	12th Place	

=== Music videos ===
Year	Title	Singer	Ref.
2022	Jado Main Tere Kol Si	Raj Barman	

== Theatre ==
Tiwari has also been associated with theatre productions. In 2018, she appeared alongside Rahul Bhuchar and Rakesh Bedi in the stage play Jab We Separated, produced under the banner of Felicity Theatre.

== Accolades ==
Tiwari is a recipient of several accolades including eight Indian Television Academy Awards, nine Indian Telly Awards and two Gold Awards.
