= S. Manasvi =

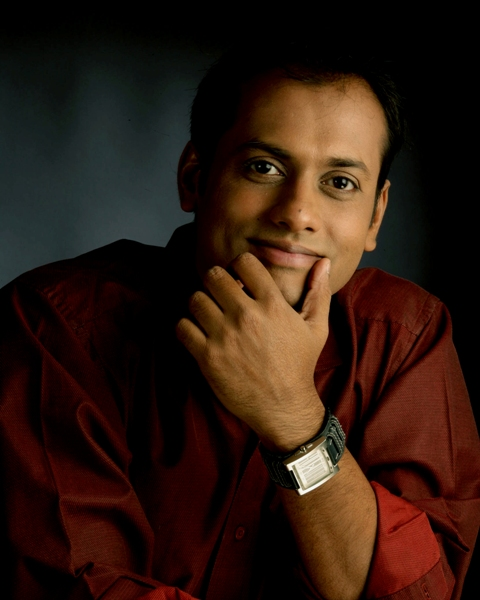

S. Manasvi, also known as Manasvi Sharma, is an architect from Madhav Institute of Technology and Science (MITS), Gwalior who later, became a filmmaker and a writer. He is an alumnus of the Film and Television Institute of India, Pune. After passing out of FTII in 2004, he made corporate films, adfilms, music videos and wrote for Television. He has been credited the dialogue writer for Left Right Left, Choti Bahu and several other shows. He also wrote the dialogue for Parvarrish – Kuchh Khattee Kuchh Meethi, Ek Boond Ishq and Hum Hain Na, Ek Veer Ki Ardaas...Veera, Jiji Maa, Dilli Wali Thakur Gurls, Jeet Gayi Toh Piya Morey. He is credited as story-writer for Kavya – Ek Jazbaa, Ek Junoon and as story-screenplay-dialogue writer for various episodes of Wagle Ki Duniya – Nayi Peedhi Naye Kissey.

He made his debut as a film director with Rajshri Productions' Love U...Mr. Kalakaar! featuring Tusshar Kapoor, Amrita Rao, Ram Kapoor, Madhoo, Kiran Kumar, Jai Kalra and in a very special appearance, Prem Chopra. The film introduces Prashant Ranyal in a cameo. This film was released on 13 May 2011 and got mixed response from critics and audience alike. He has also directed several short films and two web-series - Adi Suri Ki Dulhaniya & Gum Ho Jayen. He has written the web-series Bada Naam Karenge for SonyLIV which has been appreciated by audience and critics alike.
