= Begusarai (TV series) =

- Genre: Family; Romantic; Soap opera
- Developed by: Sachin Mohite
- Written by: Anshuman Sinha; Mahesh Pandey; Shobhit Jaiswal; Dilip & Archita Jha; Kamal Pandey; Prakriti Mukherjee; Ajit Kumar
- Directed by: Yogesh Bijendra Bhati
- Creative director: Pritha Nag
- Starring: Shivangi Joshi; Shweta Tiwari; Sartaj Gill; Vishal Aditya Singh
- Opening theme: Begusarai Tune
- Country of origin: India
- Original language: Hindi
- No. of seasons: 2
- No. of episodes: 346

Production
- Production location: India
- Camera setup: Single-camera
- Running time: 22 minutes
- Production companies: Saregama Productions (2015); Swastik Productions (2015-2016)

Original release
- Network: &TV
- Release: 2 March 2015 – 24 June 2016

Begusarai is a soap opera that aired on &TV. The show aired from 2 March 2015 to 24 June 2016. The show was produced by Swastik Pictures. It starred Shivangi Joshi, Vishal Aditya Singh, Shweta Tiwari, and Sartaj Gill in lead roles.

The show is set in Begusarai, Bihar which shows the story of a High Respected goon-based Thakur family in Begusarai, turns the love of family into hate and violence when their sons Priyom and Lakhan falls for their Shy neighbour servants daughter Poonam.

== Plot ==
The intelligent Poonam Kumari dreams of higher studies. Her childhood best friend Priyom is the son of Begusarai's Bahubali Phulan Thakur, whose nephew Lakhan has loved Poonam since childhood. Phulan marries Lakhan who starts to torture Poonam. Breaking the alliance, Phulan plans a fixed wedding for Poonam and Priyom and they fall in love. Lakhan wreaks havoc on the Begusarai and Thakur families. Poonam decides to marry him, so he will leave Thakur's family alone.

Bindiya, a dancer enters Begusarai to make money by dancing in events. She wants to ruin the Thakurs as her father was the former king of Begusarai whom Phulan killed, bringing Bindiya and her mother on the road, and thus becoming the king himself. Once Lakhan and Poonam marry, he again tortures her. Poonam learns about Lakhan's love for her and how he never hurt anyone when trying to woo her; she starts to like and turns him into a soft person, and they become closer.

Priyom is constantly angered by Bindiya's antics and tries to change her. Guddi is pregnant with the child of Poonam's brother, who dies in an accident. Poonam blames Lakhan for this, and they are separated. Bindiya and Priyom fall in love; he becomes the Bahubali of Begusarai. Priyom tries to stop Mithilesh from killing a cheating business partner, but ends up being collateral and dies by his hands. Bindiya swears vengeance on Mithilesh. The entire family opposes her, except for Poonam and Lakhan. She decides to file a case against Mithilesh but loses when Badi Amma locks Poonam in the supply closet. Datta Ji leaves jail and returns to the Thakur Haveli. He strips Bindiya in front of the entire Begusarai and drowns her. Lakhan and Poonam unsuccessfully try to save her. He also tries to kill Guddi and her child, but Poonam and Lakhan save her.

Poonam and Lakhan finally reveal their mutual feelings and start a new relationship. Bindiya is revealed to be alive and returns for vengeance against the entire Thakur family for not saving her. She gives mercy to Lakhan and Poonam but tortures the rest of the family members and even kills Datta Ji. Choti Amma's granddaughter, Komal, comes to visit her while Bindiya becomes the Bahubali of Begusarai. Komal falls in love with Lakhan and financially assists Bindiya by bringing her a Sarkar business partner. Sarkar demands much from Bindiya, costing Guddi to lose her child and Lakhan and Poonam to almost divorce. The Thakur family oppose Bindiya and Komal and try to discover who Sarkar is. Sarkar is revealed to be Choti Amma, who wants revenge on the Thakur family and brought Komal to the Thakur family. In a chase between Komal and Choti Amma and Lakhan and Mithilesh, Komal's car falls off a cliff, and Choti Amma and Komal die. Bindiya is revealed to be pregnant with Priyom's child.

A couple of months later, Poonam and Mithilesh's wife, Maya, are pregnant. When the three daughters-in-law celebrate their baby shower and do puja by the river, Guddi is pulled into the water. Her cadaver is found. It is revealed that Komal is alive and killed Guddi. Komal then kidnaps Mithilesh and Poonam's father, demanding that Poonam leave Lakhan. Mithilesh and Poonam's father flee, but Poonam's father dies in the ensuing chase. Poonam decides to surrender herself for the safety of the Thakur family. Lakhan finds Poonam and Komal and shoots Komal in the chest. Poonam falls unconscious, and Lakhan takes her to the hospital. At the hospital, goons kidnap Poonam, and it is revealed that Komal was saved after she had been shot. Komal shoots Mithilesh and Lakhan, and Poonam dies during childbirth. Bindiya takes the baby and decides to raise him as her own.

=== 20 years later ===
Twenty years later, Bindiya has become Ma Thakurain and cares for Mithilesh and Maya's children, Soni, Adarsh, Amar, and Samar, her and Priyom's son, Garv, and Poonam and Lakhan's son, Shakti, who resembles Lakhan. Bindiya hates women because of what Komal did to the family. The entire family is scared of her and never do anything she does not like. All of the boys are like goons and do everything for Bindiya. Everyone calls her mom, and Maya is jealous because her children do not consider her their real mother. Ananya Mishra, the daughter of Ramakant Mishra, a constable who is transferred to Begusarai, arrives. Ananya has an older good-for-nothing brother named Mayank (Mithil Jain), who chats with Soni online.

Ananya and Shakti first meet when Shakthi saves Ramakant from goons. He asks for money, but since she has none, he takes her late mother's necklace. She retrieves it and learns he fears his mother. They have funny interactions. Mayank and Soni meet secretly, but someone sees them and tells Ma Thakurain. She plans to have Soni marry within three days. When Mayank hears of this, he attempts suicide. When Ananya discovers the reason for the attempt, she decides to let Soni and Mayank meet for a final time. But Mayank cheats Ananya and flees with Soni. When the five brothers learn Ananya helped Soni escape, they kidnap her and torture them to learns where Soni and Mayank are.

When Ananya is freed, helped by police, the police arrest Ma Thakurain and the brothers seek revenge. Ma Thakurain leaves jail, and Soni and Mayank return to Badi Haveli. Ma Thakurain decides to allow Soni and Mayank's marriage, but they live in their house on Mayank's condition. She asks Shakti to make Ananya fall in love with him, and then she will marry all of her sons. Ananya falls in love with Shakti, and Bindiya has her marry all of the sons without interference. When Ananya learns the truth of her sham marriage, she seeks vengeance on the Thakur family. She refuses any relations with the brothers and learns the oldest, Adarsh, is secretly married and is about to have his child.

She gets Adarsh's wife her rights in the house, and Shakthi falls in love with Ananya. Bindiya reverts to her former self when Badi Amma tells her she acted precisely like Datta Ji. Ananya talks to Bindiya and then asks if she can leave. Shakthi asks her to stay, but she says her trust was broken, and she cannot. A few months later, Ananya is shown to be a teacher at a school, and Shakti arrives. He asks her to forgive him and marry him for real, and she finally forgives him. The show ends with Ananya forgiving Shakti.

== Cast ==
=== Main ===
- Vishal Aditya Singh as
  - Lakhan Thakur: Bhushan and Rekha's son; Poonam's husband; Shakti's father (2015–2016)
  - Shakti Thakur: Poonam and Lakhan's son; Ananya's husband (2016)
- Shivangi Joshi as Poonam Jadhav: Lakhan's wife; Shakti's mother; Priyom's ex-fiancée (2015–2016)
- Shweta Tiwari as Bindiya Thakur: Priyom's wife; Garv's mother; mother-figure to Shakti, Pintu, Amar, Samar and Soni (2015–2016)
- Sarrtaj Gill as Priyom Thakur: Phulan's second son; Bindiya's husband; Garv's father; Poonam's ex-fiancé (2015)
- Veebha Anand as Ananya Mishra: Shakti's wife (2016)

=== Recurring ===
- Rati Pandey as Komal Thakur: Chhoti Amma's relative; Poonam's enemy (2015–2016)
- Ankit Gupta as Garv Priyom Thakur: Priyom and Bindiya's son (2016)
- Sulbha Arya as Nandita “Badi Amma” Devi: The eldest member of the Thakur family; Phulan and Bhushan's mother; Chhoti Amma's elder sister (2015–2016)
- Madhavi Gogate as Chhoti Amma / Sarkar: Badi Amma's younger sister; Komal's relative (2015–2016)
- Narendra Jha as Phulan Thakur: Patriarch of the Thakur family; Mithlesh, Priyom, Guddi and Rajkumar's father (2015–2016)
- Sudesh Berry as Manohar Rajacharan Thakur / Datta Ji: Phulan's cousin (2015)
- Harshh Sethi as Bhushan Thakur: Phulan's younger brother; Rekha's husband; Laakhan's father (2015–2016)
- Malini Sengupta as Rekha Bhushan Thakur: Bhushan's wife; Laakhan's mother (2015–2016)
- Darshan Dave as Mithilesh Phulan Thakur: Elder son of Phulan Thakur; Maya's husband; Soni, Pintu, Amar and Samar's father (2015–2016)
- Vaishnavi Dhanraj/Kanishka Soni as Maya Mithilesh Thakur: Mithilesh's wife; Soni, Pintu, Amar and Samar's mother (2015–2016)
  - Kanishka Soni replaced Vaishnavi Dhanraj as Maya Mithilesh Thakur (2016)
- Riya Deepsi as Soni Mithilesh Thakur: Mithilesh and Maya's daughter; Pintu, Amar and Samar's sister (2016)
- Manish Naggdev as Adarsh "Pintu" Mithilesh Thakur: Mithilesh and Maya's eldest son; Soni, Amar and Samar's brother (2016)
- Parichay Sharma as Amar Mithilesh Thakur: Mithilesh and Maya's second son; Samar's twin brother; Soni and Pintu's younger brother (2016)
- Mukul Raj Singh as Samar Mithilesh Thakur: Mithilesh and Maya's third son; Amar's twin brother; Soni and Pintu's younger brother(2016)
- Aru Krishansh Verma as Rajkumar Phulan Thakur: Phulan's youngest son (2015)
- Richa Mukherjee as Gauri "Guddi" Phulan Thakur: Phulan's daughter: Mithilesh, Priyom and Rajkumar's sister; Dolt's lover (2015–2016)
- Nikhil Mehta as Dalbir "Dolt" Kumar Mahendra Jadhav: Poonam's brother; Guddi's lover (2015)
- Abhimanyyu Raj Singh as Ramakant Mishra: Ananya's father (2016)
- Mithil Jain as Mayank Ramakant Mishra: Ananya's brother
- Aalisha Panwar as Najma Akhtar Khan (2015)
- Saptrishi Ghosh as SP K N Rai
- Ankit Mohan as SP Avinash Srivastav (2015)
- Dheeraj Miglani as Ghungroo
- Vineet Raina as Bhanu (2015)
- Nandini Singh as Shravani

== Background and production ==
=== Development and writing ===
After the launch of &pictures in November 2014, ZEE network launched its second channel under the "&" network brand, "&tv", to be launched in March 2015. The channel's original content line-up was announced in early 2015 with "Begusarai" included, announced as a thriller serial. All promos were featured on ZEE.

=== Casting ===
Vishal Aditya Singh as Lakhan Thakur and Shivangi Joshi as Poonam Thakur were cast as the lead. Talking about their characters, "Singh portrays a angry young man and Joshi portrays the simple girl in the show. Shweta Tiwari was cast to portray the negative lead in the show. And talking about her character, she said:

I play a nachaniya called Bindiya from Begusarai, a small town in Bihar where the Thakur family is based. She is ameethi churi. All the bahubalis in are enamoured by her beauty. She uses this to her advantage as a way to escape her poverty and make way into the powerful Thakur family.

Sartaj Gill was roped to play another important character in the series. But later he quit the show and said:

“I quit the show because I did not like the way the story was progressing. My character was a Casanova and bindass, but it soon became a homely one and that was the moment when the character lost its importance. That was one of the many reasons, which supported my decision of quitting the show. It started becoming boring for me and the audiences too.”

=== Filming ===
The series is set in Begusarai and the fictional town of Bihar. Filming began in December 2014 and the sets are based in Film City as well as Umargam, Gujarat.

== Awards and nomination ==
Year	Award	Category	Recipient	Result	Ref
2015	Indian Telly Awards	Best Actress in a Negative Role	Shweta Tiwari	Won	
2015	Indian Telly Awards	Fresh New Face - Female	Shivangi Joshi	Nominated	
2015	Indian Telly Awards	Fresh New Face - Male	Sartaj Gill	Nominated	
2015	Indian Telly Awards	Best Onscreen Couple	Vishal Aditya Singh and Shivangi Joshi	Nominated	
2015	Indian Television Academy Awards	Best Actress in a Negative Role	Shweta Tiwari	Won	
2015	Gold Awards	Popular thriller show	Begusarai	Won	
2015	Gold Awards	Best Actress in Supporting Role	Rati Pandey	Nominated	
