= Prerna Sharma (character) =

- Kasautii Zindagii Kay character
- First appearance: 29 October 2001
- Last appearance: 28 February 2008
- Created by: Ekta Kapoor; Balaji Telefilms
- Portrayed by: Shweta Tiwari

In-universe information
- Gender: Female
- Occupation: Businesswoman
- Spouse: Anurag (2003 - 04); Rishab Bajaj (2002) (2004 - 08)
- Children: 04

Prerna Sharma Bajaj/Basu is the central protagonist of the Indian television series Kasautii Zindagii Kay, which premiered in 2001. Created by Ekta Kapoor and produced by Balaji Telefilms, the show became a cultural phenomenon, particularly due to Prerna's character, which resonates with viewers on multiple levels. Portrayed by actress Shweta Tiwari, Prerna embodies qualities such as resilience, loyalty, and a strong moral compass, making her one of the most memorable characters in Indian television history.

== Development ==
Set against the backdrop of modern Indian society, Kasautii Zindagii Kay explores complex themes of love, betrayal, and family dynamics. Prerna's character is intricately woven into this narrative, representing the struggles faced by women in a patriarchal culture. Her journey reflects the challenges and aspirations of young women seeking love and fulfillment while navigating societal expectations.

== Legacy ==
Prerna’s impact extends beyond the original series. The character has been revisited in reboots and adaptations, demonstrating her lasting appeal. Newer generations of viewers are introduced to her story, allowing her legacy to continue. The themes of love, sacrifice, and resilience that Prerna embodies remain relevant, making her a timeless figure in Indian television.

== Character background ==
=== Family dynamics ===
Prerna Sharma hails from a middle-class family, which plays a crucial role in shaping her values and outlook on life. Her parents are depicted as traditional yet supportive, instilling in her the importance of family and moral integrity. This foundation is central to Prerna’s character; her loyalty and sense of responsibility toward her family are defining traits. She often prioritizes her family's needs over her own, illustrating the traditional expectations placed on women in Indian Punjabi society. She has been a dutiful daughter, a responsible daughter-in-law, a loving wife, an emotional and supportive mother, and a strict grandmother.
