= Kasautii Zindagii Kay (2001 TV series) =

Indian Hindi-language television series

- Title Card
- Genre: Drama; Romance
- Created by: Ekta Kapoor
- Developed by: Ekta Kapoor
- Story by: Mahesh Pandey
- Directed by: Santram Varma; Gautam Sobti; Qaeed Kuwajerwala; Ravindra Gautam; Santosh Bhatt; Yash Chauhan; Raminder Singh Suri; Sushen Bhatnagar; Rajeev Bhatia; Ashish Bhatia; Jitendra K. Basantt; Rohit Malhotra; Sangeeta Rao; Deepak Chavan; Jignesh Vaishnav; Arvind Babbal; Rishi Tyagi; Hitesh Tejwani; Shankar Verma; Anoop Chaudhary; V. G. Roy
- Creative directors: Monisha Singh; Nivedita Basu; Doris Dey; Shipra Arora; Shiwangi Singh Chauhan; Riti Chopra
- Starring: Cezanne Khan; Shweta Tiwari; Hiten Tejwani; Ronit Roy; Urvashi Dholakia
- Theme music composer: Lalit Sen
- Opening theme: Babul Supriyo and Priya Bhattacharya
- Country of origin: India
- Original language: Hindi
- No. of seasons: 1
- No. of episodes: 1,423

Production
- Executive producer: Niel Singh
- Producers: Ekta Kapoor; Shobha Kapoor
- Cinematography: Santosh Suryavanshi; Deepak Malwankar; Rajesh Naag
- Editors: Dharmesh Shah; Sanjeev Shukla; Uday Raj; Achintya Ghosh; Vikas Sharma; Sandeep Bhatt
- Camera setup: Multi-camera
- Running time: 24 minutes

Original release
- Network: Star Plus
- Release: 29 October 2001 – 28 February 2008

Related
- Kasautii Zindagii Kay (2018 TV series)

Kasautii Zindagii Kay (transl. The Trials of Life) is an Indian Hindi-language romantic drama television series produced by Ekta Kapoor's Balaji Telefilms on StarPlus. The show starred Shweta Tiwari, Cezanne Khan, Ronit Roy, and Urvashi Dholakia. The show aired from 29 October 2001 to 28 February 2008. Kasautii Zindagii Kay is one of the longest-running Indian television soap operas. The entire series is digitally available on Disney+ Hotstar.

== Plot ==
Anurag and Prerna fall in love, but fate repeatedly separates them. Komolika and Rishabh Bajaj play a vital catalyst in the story. Spanning eighty years, the story revolves around Anurag, Prerna and their children, Prem and Sneha, and eventually their grandchildren.

=== Chapters ===
Chapter No.	Episodes	Chapter description
Chapter 1	1 - 26	Anurag Basu and Prerna Sharma are in love. Mohini, Anurag's mother, wants him to marry Komolika.
Chapter 2	27 – 67	Anurag marries Komolika due to his mother's emotional blackmail; Prerna is pregnant with his child.
Chapter 3	67 – 108	Moloy recovers from coma and learns about Anurag and Komolika's marriage.
Chapter 4	109 – 164	Komolika and Anurag divorce.
Chapter 5	165 – 210	Prerna marries Rishabh Bajaj to protect the assets of Basu family.
Chapter 6	211 – 276	Bajaj's wife Menka poses problems for Bajaj as they are not divorced yet.
Chapter 7	277 – 330	Bajaj disappears after his accident. Prerna and Anurag get engaged and married happily.
Chapter 8	331 – 374	Bajaj creates problems in Anurag and Prerna's paradise. He clicked intimate photos with Prerna in Pune by making her unconscious, later he used these photos to blackmail her with the help of Mr. Patel, who was also involved in Prem's kidnapping.
Chapter 9	375 – 402	Prerna and Anurag's son Prem is abducted, due to the irresponsible behaviour of Prerna, who forgot to pick up Prem from school . Prerna had ignored her responsibility towards Prem many times before, because of Kuki, Bajaj's daughter. Prem dies.
Chapter 10	403 – 441	Anurag and Prerna's marriage fell apart due to misunderstandings and Prem's death. Anurag marries Aparna, leaving pregnant Prerna alone for her misdeed.
Chapter 11	442 – 472	Prerna is mad at Anurag and moves to Panchmeshwar with her daughter, Sneha.
Chapter 12	473 – 511	After eight years, Sneha visits Anurag's house. Due to the pressurised situation, Prerna unwillingly decides to engage with Bajaj.
Chapter 13	512 – 572	Sneha is diagnosed with leukaemia. Anurag and Prerna become closer due to Sneha's illness and have another child named Prem Jr. Bajaj realizes that Prerna only loves Anurag.
Chapter 14	573 – 623	Aparna's plot to murder Anurag.
Chapter 15	624 – 646	Prerna is accused of Aparna's murder.
Chapter 16	647 – 685	Anurag does not show interest in getting back with Prerna, so she decides to marry Bajaj. Madhavi reveals her pregnancy, but Bajaj refuses to accept Madhavi as well as his unborn child.
Chapter 17	686 – 757	Generation Leap: Shravan avenges his mother Aparna's death.
Chapter 18	758 – 781	Anurag, Prerna and Bajaj meet with a fatal accident. Prerna suffers from amnesia; she only remembers her marriage with Anurag. After she regains her memory, she accuses Anurag of conspiracy, but she realizes her mistakes and apologizes to Anurag.
Chapter 19	782 – 833	Bajaj's past comes out. Tanisha is Bajaj's child with Madhavi, whom he refused to accept so he could marry Prerna.
Chapter 20	834 – 873	Yudi is actually Prem Jr.
Chapter 21	874 – 928	Yudi's transformation. Prerna takes charge to change Prem.
Chapter 22	929 – 993	Mukti and Yudi grow closer. Sharad assaults Mukti.
Chapter 23	994 – 1022	An attempt to take Prerna's life.
Chapter 24	1023 – 1048	Anurag marries Sampada. Prerna takes the blame for Sneha's offence and goes to jail.
Chapter 25	1049 – 1069	After five years: Anurag and Sampada are living happily and have taken Prem and Sneha's responsibility. Bajaj destroys his business and leaves his family to suffer alone. He cut all relations with his family after finding out that Prerna can't love anyone but Anurag. Meanwhile, Anurag provides shelter to Bajaj's family. Prerna returns from jail.
Chapter 26	1070 – 1101	Prem is shattered by Mukti's death.
Chapter 27	1102 – 1163	Prem is taken to Panchameshwar for treatment.
Chapter 28	1164 – 1202	Aparna's attempt to murder Prerna.
Chapter 29	1203 – 1250	Kasak falsely frames Shravan for her condition and manipulates Bajaj against Shravan. Bajaj vows to destroy Shravan. Prerna shoots Anurag.
Chapter 30	1251 – 1300	Twenty years later, Prerna's granddaughter Prerna (P2) is the protagonist. Anurag returns as Pratham Mittal.
Chapter 31	1301 – 1358	Sampada confesses her crime. Prerna apologises to Anurag. Anurag exposes Bajaj that he is still alive.
Chapter 32	1359 – 1394	Anurag exposes Komolika's plan.
Chapter 33	1395 – 1423	Komolika points the gun at Anurag, but Prerna takes the bullet to save Anurag. However, both Anurag and Prerna die in each other's arms. Komolika falls off the cliff and dies. Prerna and Anurag unite in death. Prem writes a book: Kasautii Zindagii Kay on Anurag and Prerna's life. Mr. Bajaj is left alone forever and the two true love birds unite after death.

== Cast ==
=== Main ===
- Shweta Tiwari as Prerna Sharma: Veena and Rajesh's daughter; Shekhar, Shivani, Mitali and Mahesh's sister; Anurag's ex-wife; Bajaj's wife; Prem, Sneha, Jr. Prem and Kasak's mother; Vishakha, Tushar and Kokila’s adoptive mother; Jr. Prerna, Dhara and Rudraksh's grandmother; Tanvi, Tara, Jwala, Gargi and Kanishtha's adoptive grandmother (2001–2008)
- Cezanne Khan / Hiten Tejwani as Anurag Basu: Mohini and Moloy's son; Nivedita, Rakhi and Tapur's brother; Prerna, Komolika and Aparna's ex-husband; Sampada's widower; Prem, Sneha and Jr. Prem's father; Shravan's adoptive father; Jr. Prerna, Dhara and Rudraksh's grandfather; Kritika's adoptive grandfather (2001–2007) / (2007–2008)
- Urvashi Dholakia as Komolika Majumdar: Uma's daughter; Subroto's wife; Anurag and Akash's ex-wife; Prem and Shravan's foster mother; Kritika's foster grandmother (2001–2008)
- Ronit Roy as Rishabh Bajaj: Mahesh's brother; Menka's widower; Prerna's husband; Vishakha, Tushar, Kukki, Tanisha and Kasak's father; Sneha's adoptive father; Tanvi, Tara, Jwala, Gargi, Kanishtha and Kritika's grandfather; Jr. Prerna's adoptive grandfather (2002–2008)

=== Recurring ===
==== Sharmas ====
- Nandita Thakur as Veena Sharma – Rajesh's wife; Shekhar, Prerna, Shivani, Mitali and Mahesh's mother; Prem, Sneha, Jr. Prem and Kasak's grandmother; Vishakha, Tushar and Kokila's adoptive grandmother; Jr. Prerna, Dhara and Rudraksh's great grandmother; Tanvi, Tara, Jwala, Gargi and Kanishtha's adoptive great grandmother (2001–2008)
- Manoj Pandey as Shekhar Sharma – Rajesh and Veena's elder son; Prerna, Shivani, Mitali and Mahesh's brother; Suman's husband (2001–2004)
- Shivani Gosain as Suman Sharma – Shekhar's wife (2001–2004)
- Kusumit Sana as Shivani Sharma – Rajesh and Veena's second daughter; Prerna, Shekhar, Mitali and Mahesh's sister; Subroto's former wife (2001–2003)
- Kishwer Merchant as Mitali Sharma – Rajesh and Veena's youngest daughter; Prerna, Shekhar, Shivani and Mahesh's sister (2001–2004)
- Mahesh Pandey as Mahesh Sharma – Rajesh and Veena's younger son; Prerna, Shekhar, Shivani and Mitali's brother; Kajol's husband (2001–2004)
- Tasneem Sheikh / Prerna Shah as Kajol Basu Sharma – Pranay and Yamini's daughter; Anirudh and Subroto's sister; Mahesh's wife (2001–2003) / (2003)

==== Basus ====
- Deepak Qazir as Moloy Basu – Pranay and Sanjay's brother; Mohini's husband; Rakhi, Nivedita, Anurag and Tapur's father; Prem, Diya, Sneha and Jr. Prem's grandfather; Shravan's adoptive grandfather; Jr. Prerna, Dhara and Rudraksh's great grandfather; Kritika's adoptive great grandfather (2001–2005) (Dead)
- Kannu Gill as Mohini Basu – Moloy's wife; Rakhi, Nivedita, Anurag and Tapur's mother; Prem, Diya, Sneha and Jr. Prem's grandmother; Shravan's adoptive grandmother; Jr. Prerna, Dhara and Rudraksh's great grandmother; Kritika's adoptive great grandmother (2001–2008)
- Unknown as Prem Basu – Anurag and Prerna's elder son; Sneha and Jr. Prem's brother; Kasak's half-brother (2002–2003) (Dead)
- Karanvir Bohra / Vikas Sethi as Yudi / Jr. Prem Basu – Anurag and Prerna's younger son; Prem and Sneha's brother; Kasak's half-brother; Devki's husband; Palchin's widower; Dhara and Rudraksh's father (2005–2008)
- Shubhangi Atre / Monika Singh / Shriya Bisht as Palchin Verma Basu – Jr. Prem's late wife; Dhara's mother (2007–2008)
- Tina Parekh as
  - Mukti Deshmukh – Jeevan's daughter; Jr. Prem's love interest (2005–2006) (Dead)
  - Devki Basu – Mukti's lookalike; Jr. Prem's second wife; Rudraksh's mother (2006–2008)
- Deepak Bajaj as Rudraksh Basu – Jr. Prem and Devki's son; Dhara's half-brother (2007–2008)
- Abhinav Kapoor / Pradeep Kharab / Puneet Sachdev as Shravan Basu – Aparna and Debo's son; Anurag's adoptive son; Tanisha's husband; Kritika's father (2005–2007)
  - Chintan Shah as Child Shravan Basu
- Shubha Verma as Tanisha Khanna Basu – Rishabh and Madhavi's daughter; Vineet's adoptive daughter; Vishakha, Tushar, Kukki and Kasak's half-sister; Shravan's wife; Kritika's mother (2005–2007)
- Gazala Selmin as Kritika Basu – Shravan and Tanisha's daughter (2007–2008)
- Moonmoon Banerjee as Sampada Basu – Anurag's late wife (2005–2007)
- Aparna Jaywant as Tapur Basu – Moloy and Mohini's youngest daughter; Anurag, Nivedita and Rakhi's sister (2001–2003)
- Yatin Karyekar as Pranay Basu – Moloy and Sanjay's brother; Yamini's husband; Subroto, Anirudh and Kajol's father (2001–2003)
- Niyati Joshi as Yamini Basu – Pranay's wife; Subroto, Anirudh and Kajol's mother (2001–2006)
- Ankur Nayyar / Pracheen Chauhan / Prem Agarwal / Vishal Puri / Aashish Kaul as Subroto Basu – Pranay and Yamini's elder son; Anirudh and Kajol's brother; Shivani's ex-husband; Komolika's widower (2001–2006)
- Rushad Rana as Anirudh Basu – Pranay and Yamini's younger son; Subroto and Kajol's brother (2001–2002)
- Naveen Saini as Sanjay Basu – Moloy and Pranay's brother; Geeta's husband; Samay and Shulabh's father (2001–2005)
- Monica Pradhan / Jayati Bhatia as Geeta Basu – Sanjay's wife; Samay and Shulabh's mother (2001–2006)
- Hitesh Kriplani as Samay Basu – Sanjay and Geeta's elder son; Shulabh's brother (2001–2005)
- Om Bhanushali as Shulabh Basu – Sanjay and Geeta's younger son; Samay's brother (2001–2005)

==== Senguptas ====
- Himani Shivpuri as Chaini Sengupta – Praveen, Anupam and Indraneel's mother; Diya's grandmother (2002–2003)
- Manav Gohil / Tarun Khanna as Praveen Sengupta – Chaini's eldest son; Anupam and Indraneel's brother; Rakhi's husband; Diya's father (2001–2004)
- Prachi Thakker as Rakhi Basu Sengupta – Moloy and Mohini's eldest daughter; Nivedita, Anurag and Tapur's sister; Praveen's wife; Diya's mother (2001–2007)
- Barkha Bisht as Diya Sengupta – Rakhi and Praveen's daughter (2005)
- Manish Goel / Hiten Paintal as Anupam Sengupta – Chaini's second son; Praveen and Indraneel's brother; Nivedita's husband (2001–2003) / (2006)
- Poonam Narula / Smita Bansal as Nivedita Basu Sengupta – Moloy and Mohini's second daughter; Rakhi, Anurag and Tapur's sister; Anupam's wife (2001–2003) / (2006)
- Sikandar Kharbanda as Indraneel Sengupta – Chaini's youngest son; Anupam and Praveen's brother; Komolika's spy (2002–2008)

==== Bajajs ====
- Vishal Sabnani as Tushar Bajaj – Rishabh and Menka's son; Prerna's adopted son; Vishakha and Kukki's brother; Tanisha and Kasak's half-brother; Sneha’s adoptive brother; Doris's husband; Tara, Jwala, Gargi and Kanishtha's father (2002–2008)
- Suzanne Bernert as Doris Bajaj – Tushar's wife; Tara, Jwala, Gargi and Kanishtha's mother (2006–2008)
- Nidhi Uttam as Tara Bajaj – Tushar and Doris' eldest daughter; Jwala, Gargi and Kanishtha's sister (2007–2008)
- Praneeta Sahu as Jwala Bajaj – Tushar and Doris' second daughter; Tara, Gargi and Kanishtha's sister (2007–2008)
- Sreejita De as Gargi Bajaj – Tushar and Doris' third daughter; Tara, Jwala and Kanishtha's sister (2007–2008)
- Rudrakshi Shetty as Kanishtha Bajaj – Tushar and Doris' youngest daughter; Tara, Jwala and Gargi's sister (2007–2008)
- Tarana Raja / Preeti Puri / Amita Chandekar as Vishakha Bajaj – Rishabh and Menka's elder daughter; Tushar and Kukki's sister; Tanisha and Kasak's half-sister; Sneha’s adoptive sister; Tanvi's mother (2002–2007)
- Shriya Parekh as Tanvi Bajaj – Vishakha and Aditya's daughter; Kukki's adopted daughter (2007–2008)
- Mansi Parekh / Garima Bhatnagar as Kokila "Kukki" Bajaj – Rishabh and Menka's younger daughter; Tushar and Vishakha's sister; Tanisha and Kasak's half-sister; Sneha’s adoptive sister; Tanvi's adoptive mother (2004–2007)
  - Swapnali Kulkarni as Child Kokila "Kukki" Bajaj (2002–2003)
- Surveen Chawla / Parineeta Seth as Kasak Bajaj – Prerna and Rishabh's daughter; Vishakha, Tushar, Kukki, Tanisha, Prem, Sneha and Jr. Prem's half-sister; Shravan's ex-fiancée; Kritika's surrogate mother (2005–2006) / (2007) (Dead)
- Amar Upadhyay / Sanjeet Bedi as Advocate Mahesh Bajaj – Rishabh's brother; Nandini's husband; Yuvraj's father (2005–2007)
- Jatin Shah as Yuvraj Bajaj – Mahesh and Nandini's son (2006) (Dead)

==== Gills ====
- Shabbir Ahluwalia as Omi Gill – Sneha's second husband; Jr. Prerna's father (2006–2007)
- Jennifer Winget as Sneha Basu Gill – Anurag and Prerna's daughter; Bajaj's adopted daughter; Prem and Jr. Prem's sister; Kasak's Vishakha, Tushar and Kukki’s half-sister; Sharad's ex-wife; Omi's widow; Jr. Prerna's mother (2005–2007)
  - Shriya Sharma as Child Sneha Bajaj (2004–2005)
- Navneet Nishan as Anahita Gill – Omi's aunt (2006–2007)

==== Garewals ====
- Tuhina Vohra as Devyana Garewal – Vardaan and Nihal's mother (2007–2008)
- Mridul Sanghvi as Vardaan Garewal – Devyana's elder son; Nihal's brother; Dhara's husband (2007–2008)
- Wasna Ahmed as Dhara Basu Garewal – Jr. Prem and Palchin's daughter; Rudraksh's half-sister; Vardaan's wife (2007–2008)
- Naman Shaw as Nihal Garewal – Devyana's younger son; Vardaan's brother; Jr. Prerna's husband (2007–2008)
- Kratika Sengar Dheer as Jr. Prerna "P2" Gill Garewal – Sneha and Omi's daughter; Saksham's love interest; Nihal's wife (2007–2008)

==== Others ====
- Mini Ribeiro as Uma Majumdar – Komolika's mother; Prem and Shravan's adoptive grandmother; Kritika's adoptive great grandmother (2001–2002)
- Poonam Joshi as Jyoti – Prerna's best friend (2001–2002) / (2003–2004)
- Anand Suryavanshi / Vivek Mushran / Nasir Khan as Vineet Khanna – Anurag's business partner and best friend; Madhavi's husband; Tanisha's adoptive father (2001–2006)
- Sonal Sehgal / Vaishnavi Mahant as Advocate Madhavi Bose Khanna – Menka's sister; Vineet's wife; Tanisha's mother (2004–2006)
- Prashant Bhatt as Akash Dasgupta – Komolika's ex-husband (2002)
- Ruby Bhatia as Menka Bose – Madhavi's sister; Rishabh's ex-wife; Tushar, Vishakha and Kukki's mother (2002–2003) (Dead)
- Pratap Sachdev as Mr. Gupta – Bajaj's friend (2003–2006)
- Geetanjali Tikekar as Aparna Ghosh – Anurag and Debo's ex-wife; Shravan's mother; Kritika's grandmother (2003–2007)
- Yash Tonk as Debo – Anurag's friend; Aparna's ex-husband; Shravan's father; Kritika's grandfather (2004)
- Rakshanda Khan as Advocate Dorasti – Lawyer (2005)
- Sanjay Batra as Jeevan Deshmukh – Bajaj family's driver; Mukti's father (2005–2006)
- Anju Mahendru as Kamini Gupta – Sharad's mother (2005–2006)
- Amit Singh Thakur as Shailendra Gupta – Sharad's father (2005–2006)
- Karan Patel as Karan (2005–2006)
- Karan Singh Grover as Sharad Gupta – Kamini and Shailendra's son; Sneha's ex-husband (2005–2006)
- Sai Deodhar as Debonita – Komolika's niece (2006)
- Lucky Raajput as Lucky – Yudi's friend (2006)
- Ankita Bhargava Patel as Shipra – Omi's girlfriend (2006)
- Jitendra Trehan as Baba – Sampada's father (2006–2007)
- Ravi Jhankal as Mr. Verma – Palchin's father (2007)
- Sunny Nijar as Saksham – Jr. Prerna's love interest (2007) (Dead)
- Prachi Desai as Prachi Chauhan – Gurukul's student (2007)
- Sandeep Baswana as Dr. Jatin – Devki's doctor (2007)
- Muheet Khan as Smily – Dheeraj Sarna’s son and Kasak’s friend in college (2007–2008)

=== Special appearances ===
Jeetendra	at completion of 1000 episodes
Tushar Kapoor	at completion of 1000 episodes
Ekta Kapoor	at completion of 1000 episodes
Shobha Kapoor	at completion of 1000 episodes
Kajol	guest appearance for condolence of Prem's death
Smriti Irani	guest appearance for condolence of Prem's death
Sakshi Tanwar	guest appearance for condolence of Prem's death
Mouli Ganguly	guest appearance for condolence of Prem's death
Juhi Parmar	cameo to promote Kumkum – Ek Pyara Sa Bandhan and as a guest appearance for condolence of Prem's death
Aamna Sharif	cameo to promote Kahiin to Hoga
Anita Hassanandani	cameo to promote Kkavyanjali
Eijaz Khan	cameo to promote Kkavyanjali
Prachi Desai	cameo
Pallavi Subhash	cameo to promote Karam Apnaa Apnaa
Mohammed Iqbal Khan	cameo to promote Karam Apnaa Apnaa
Jay Bhanushali	cameo to promote Kayamath
Panchi Bora	cameo to promote Kayamath
Sara Khan	cameo to promote Sapna Babul Ka... Bidaai
Parul Chauhan	cameo to promote Sapna Babul Ka... Bidaai
Arjun Bijlani	cameo to promote Miley Jab Hum Tum
Sanaya Irani	cameo to promote Miley Jab Hum Tum
Harshad Chopda	cameo to promote Kis Desh Mein Hai Meraa Dil
Additi Gupta	cameo to promote Kis Desh Mein Hai Meraa Dil

== Production ==
=== Development ===
Ekta Kapoor stated that Anurag was named after her director friend, while Prerna was named after the daughter of her father's friend, actor Prem Chopra.

The series was primarily filmed on sets at Balaji House. In 2003 sets shifted into Sankraman Studio set number 11A and after leaps in 2007 shifted into Killick Nixon Studio, set number 7B in Mumbai.

In early 2003, a special sequence was shot in Australia.

In October 2003, the series featured a crossover episode with Des Mein Niklla Hoga Chand, adding a unique twist to the storyline.

In 2005, several episodes of the series (Episodes 708 to 721) were filmed in Singapore and Malaysia, adding an international flavor to the narrative due to the show's popularity in those countries.

In 2007, Cezanne Khan, who portrayed Anurag Basu, was replaced by Hiten Tejwani in the series.

=== Cancellation ===
In November 2007, it was confirmed that Kasautii Zindagii Kay would go off-air in January 2008. However, the series eventually ended on 28 February 2008. Speaking about the conclusion of the show, Kapoor stated, "I won't deny that the TRPs of Kasautii Zindagii Kay had gone down quite a bit, and moreover, I didn't have a story to tell."

== Reboot series ==
A reboot of the show, also titled Kasautii Zindagii Kay, aired on StarPlus from 25 September 2018 to 3 October 2020. However, unlike the original series, the reboot did not sustain the expected ratings. This reboot was also remade in the Kannada language on Star Suvarna, titled Premloka.

== Reception ==
=== Critics ===
Rediff.com praised the show, stating: "One nice thing about Kasautii Zindagii Kay is that all characters in the serial are very strong. Be it the protagonists or antagonists, every character stands on firm ground."

=== Ratings ===
Kasautii Zindagii Kay became the third-longest-running and top-rated Hindi GEC (General Entertainment Channel) series after Kyunki Saas Bhi Kabhi Bahu Thi and Kahaani Ghar Ghar Kii—all three produced by Balaji Telefilms. The show recorded one of the highest TRPs, helping StarPlus maintain its leading position in channel ratings.

The series started with an average rating of 4.44, which grew in subsequent years—achieving average TRPs of 7.51 in 2002, 8.83 in 2003, and 9.14 in 2004. By 18 November 2003, Kasautii garnered a 9.9 TVR, placing it in third position. The crossover episode with Des Mein Niklla Hoga Chand in October 2003 further boosted its ratings, garnering over 14 TVR.

In 2005, the show maintained its third position with a 10.93 TVR, but in the following year, it saw a slight drop to 8.78 TVR, though it retained its ranking.

By the second week of January 2007, the show continued to hold third place, albeit with a reduced rating of 5.6 TVR.

Despite being one of the top-rated Indian television series and maintaining its position among the top ten programs until 2008, Kasautii dropped to eleventh position in January 2008, after which it was soon cancelled.

== Soundtrack ==
The Kasautii Zindagii Kay soundtrack has recorded more than hundred tracks during its airing from 2001 to 2008 and won several awards. The tracks include versions of Bollywood hit songs Kya Pyaar Karoge Mujhse, Ajeeb Dastan Hai Yeh, Hum Bewafa Hargiz Na Thay, Kal Ho Naa Ho, Jiyen To Jiyen Kaisy and Do Ajnabi Kidar Ja Rahy Hain.

=== Original serial versions ===
Track listing
No.	Title	Length
1.	"Chahat Kay Safar Mein" (title track)	1:20
2.	"Milti Hai Nigahein"	1:30
3.	"Chahat Kay Safar Mein" (sad version)	1:23
4.	"Zindagii Kay Safar Mein"	1:54
5.	"Zindagi Kya Hai Jaisy"	1:29
6.	"Mujse Rootho Na Aisy"	1:45
7.	"Pyaar Ke Mor Per"	1:23
8.	"Jab Se Tum Milay Ho"	1:36
9.	"Teri Meri Yeh Yaari"	1:24
10.	"Meri Ankhon Ke Taaray"	1:32
11.	"Aega Wo Ek Din"	1:26
12.	"Jaany Anjaany Mein"	1:28
13.	"Kya Chaha Tha Mein Na"	2:34
14.	"Kabhi Aisa Bhi Hota Hai"	1:59
15.	"Koi Jab Mujse Kehta Hai"	1:46
Total length:		24:29
