= Cezanne Khan =

Indian television actor

- Born: 28 December 1972 (age 53); Bombay, Maharashtra, India
- Occupations: Model, actor
- Years active: 1997–2009; 2021–2022
- Parents: Rais Khan (father); Tasnim Khan (mother)

Cezanne Khan is an Indian television actor. He is best known for his role of Anurag Basu in Kasautii Zindagi Kay, that aired on Star Plus. He is also known for his role of Harman Singh and Nikhil Jaisingh in Shakti – Astitva Ke Ehsaas Ki, that aired on Colors TV and Appnapan – Badalte Rishton Ka Bandhan that aired on Sony Entertainment Television, respectively. He has also worked in Pakistani television series.

== Early life ==
Khan was born into a Muslim family in Bombay, India on 28 December, 1972. His father was Ustad Rais Khan, a famous sitarist. His mother, Tasnim Khan, is an interior designer. They divorced when Cezanne was three, his father later moved to Karachi, Pakistan and he and his brother were raised by his mother. His brother, Suhail Khan, is a singer, composer and sitar player.

Khan went to boarding school at Barnes in Deolali. He earned his Bachelor of Commerce from M.M.K. College of Commerce & Economics in Bandra, Mumbai.

He was named after the famous French painter Paul Cézanne.

== Career ==
During his college days, he was involved with modelling and theatre. After Cezanne finished his B.Com, he was supposed to join NMIMS (Narsee Monjee Institute of Management Studies) for MBA when he was offered a film. This film never released, but it served to prompt him leave his MBA to pursue a career in acting. It was at this point that his television career began. Anubhav Sinha offered him a role in his TV serial, Hasratein, on Zee TV and he accepted the offer. And soon after, he got Neena Gupta's Pal Chhin and Balaji Telefilms's Kaliren. He also did a bit of acting in B. R. Films' serial Dushman. Meanwhile, Ekta Kapoor was doing the auditions for Kasautii Zindagi Kay (KZK) and offered him the role of Anurag Basu. KZK catapulted Cezanne into a household name. As the shy and meek Anurag Basu in KZK, he gained immense popularity. KZK was one of the top serials of Star Plus.

He got his name from the famous French painter Paul Cezanne. But the Indian entertainment world often confused him with Hrithik Roshan's wife Suzanne Khan. However, after KZK, he was soon known by a different name altogether - Anurag Basu. "I agree that I am more popular as Anurag than by my real name. The role surely is the turning point in my career," says the actor. Due to his immense popularity, he is getting film offers as well. "But I want a lead role and no less. It should also be good and substantial". On his look in KZK he said, "Though I think looks do matter initially, something like an identity card, but as you move on from one role to the other on television, you have to have substance in you to carry you forward. You should have the charisma to impress the audience to watch you day after day".

In June 2007, Cezanne Khan entered Sony Entertainment Television's Ek Ladki Anjaani Si as Dr. Dhruv Mehra.

Khan also hosted The Good Health Show on Zee TV for some time. He acted in two Pakistani TV serials - Piya Kay Ghar Jana Hai aired on ARY Digital in 2006 and Silsilay Chahat Ke in 2007. He returned to TV after 9 years in a lead role as Harman Singh in Rashmi Sharma's TV show Shakti – Astitva Ke Ehsaas Ki, replacing Vivian Dsena opposite Rubina Dilaik.

== Relationship ==
Khan has been in a serious relationship with actress Afsheen Zehra and proposed to her in 2020. In a candid interview with Times of India, he stated - "We have been together for three years now and are happy. Had it not been for the pandemic, we would have been married by now. We plan to tie the knot later this year. Anyway, I feel there is no perfect age to get married."

== Television ==
Year	Title	Role	Notes
	Kaliren		Lead role
1998	Hasratein	Yogesh	
	The Good Health Show	Host	health show on Zee TV
1999–2000	Pal Chhin	Rajesh	
2001	Dushman		
2001–2007	Kasautii Zindagii Kay	Anurag Basu	Lead role
2003	Kya Hadsaa Kya Haqeeqat – Kab Kyun Kahaan	Kunwar Sujeet Singh	
2004—2005	Hum 2 Hain Na	Vir Singh	
2006	Piya Kay Ghar Jana Hai		Pakistani TV serial on ARY Digital
2007	Ek Ladki Anjaani Si	Dr. Dhruv Mehra	
2007	Silsilay Chahat Ke		Pakistani TV serial on ARY Digital
2009	Seeta Aur Geeta	Ravi	Lead role
2021	Shakti – Astitva Ke Ehsaas Ki	Harman Singh	Lead role
2022	Appnapan – Badalte Rishton Ka Bandhan	Nikhil Jaisingh	Lead role

== Awards and nominations ==
Year	Award Show	Category	Character	Series	Result
2002	Indian Television Academy Awards	Best Actor - Popular	Anurag Basu	Kasautii Zindagii Kay	Won
2002	Indian Telly Awards	Best Jodi	Anurag Basu	Kasautii Zindagii Kay	Won
2003	Indian Telly Awards	Best Jodi	Anurag Basu	Kasautii Zindagii Kay	Won
2003	Indian Telly Awards	Best TV Personality-Male	Anurag Basu	Kasautii Zindagii Kay	Won

== See also ==
- List of Indian television actors
