= List of awards and nominations received by Divyanka Tripathi =

Divyanka Tripathi awards and nominations
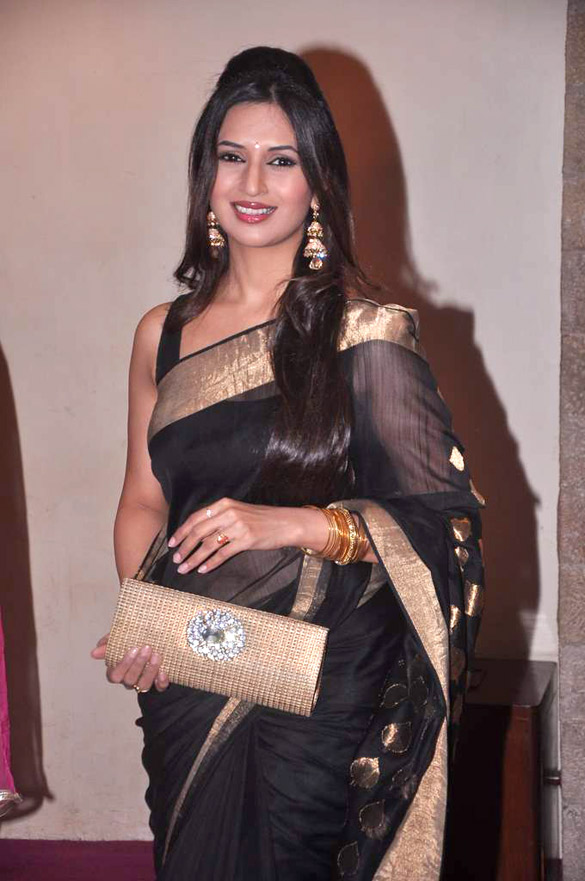
- Tripathi in 2012
Awards and nominations
Award	Wins	Nominations
Indian Television Academy Awards	3	4
Indian Telly Awards	9	6
Apsara Awards	0	2
Gold Awards	7	9
BIG Star Entertainment Awards	1	0
Asian Viewers Television Awards	1	2
Iconic Gold Awards	1	0
Pinkvilla Screen and Style Icons Awards	1	0

Totals (Note: Certain award groups do not simply award one winner. They acknowledge several different recipients, have runners-up, and have third place. Since this is a specific recognition and is different from losing an award, runner-up mentions are considered wins in this award tally. For simplification and to avoid errors, each award in this list has been presumed to have had a prior nomination.)
- Wins: 23
- Nominations: 25

Divyanka Tripathi is an Indian actress who mainly works in Hindi television. Tripathi has received several accolades including Indian Television Academy Awards, Gold Awards and Indian Telly Awards. She is best known for her portrayal of Vidya Pratap Singh in Banoo Main Teri Dulhann and Dr. Ishita Iyer Bhalla in Star Plus popular serias Yeh Hai Mohabbatein.

== Indian Television Academy Awards ==
The Indian Television Academy Awards, also known as the (ITA Awards) is an annual event organised by the Indian Television Academy. The awards are presented in various categories, including popular programming (music, news, entertainment, sports, travel, lifestyle and fashion), best television channel in various categories, technical awards, and Best Performance awards.

Year	Category	Show	Character	Result
2007	Best Actress (Popular)	Banoo Main Teri Dulhann	Vidya Pratap Singh	Won
2014	Best Actress (Jury)	Ye Hai Mohabbatein	Ishita Bhalla	Nominated
2016	GR8! ON-Screen Couple of the Year	Ye Hai Mohabbatein	Ishita Bhalla	Won
2018	Best Actress (Jury)	Ye Hai Mohabbatein	Ishita Bhalla	Won

== Star Parivaar Awards ==
Year	Category	Show	Role	Result
2014	Naya Sadasya (Female)	Ye Hai Mohabbatein	Ishita	Won
2014	Favourite International Jodi	Ye Hai Mohabbatein	Raman Ishita	Won
2014	Favourite Jodi	Ye Hai Mohabbatein	Raman Ishita	Won
2015	Favourite Jodi	Ye Hai Mohabbatein	Raman Ishita	Won
2015	Favourite Digital Sadasya (Female)	Ye Hai Mohabbatein	Ishita	Won
2015	Favourite International Jodi	Ye Hai Mohabbatein	Raman Ishita	Won
2016	Favourite International Jodi	Ye Hai Mohabbatein	Raman Ishita	Won
2016	Favourite Jodi	Ye Hai Mohabbatein	Raman Ishita	Won
2016	Favourite Digital Sadasya (Female)	Ye Hai Mohabbatein	Ishita	Won
2016	Favourite Maa	Ye Hai Mohabbatein	Ishita	Won
2016	Favourite Patni	Ye Hai Mohabbatein	Ishita	Won
2016	Favourite Bahu	Ye Hai Mohabbatein	Ishita	Won
2017	Favourite Maa	Ye Hai Mohabbatein	Ishita	Won
2018	Favourite Maa	Ye Hai Mohabbatein	Ishita	Won

== Indian Telly Awards ==
The 'Indian Telly Awards' are annual honours presented by the company of Indian Television to persons and organisations in the television industry of India. The Awards are given in several categories such as best programme or series in a specific genre, best television channel in a particular category, most popular actors and awards for technical roles such as writers and directors.

Year	Category	Show	Character	Result
2007	Fresh New Face (Female)	Banoo Main Teri Dulhann	Vidya Pratap Singh	Won
2007	Most Popular On-Screen Couple (with Sharad Malhotra)	Banoo Main Teri Dulhann	Vidya Pratap Singh	Won
2012	Best Actress in a Comic Role	Chintu Chinki Aur Ek Badi Si Love Story	Chinki	Nominated
2014	Best Actress in a Lead Role	Ye Hai Mohabbatein	Ishita Bhalla	Won
2014	Best Onscreen Couple (with Karan Patel)	Ye Hai Mohabbatein	Ishita Bhalla	Won
2015	Best Jodi (with Karan Patel)	Ye Hai Mohabbatein	Ishita Bhalla	Won
2015	Best Television Personality	—N/a	—N/a	Won
2015	Most Dynamic Personality	—N/a	—N/a	Won
2015	Best Actor in a Leading Role (Female)	Ye Hai Mohabbatein	Ishita Bhalla	Nominated
2019	Best Actress in a Lead Role (Jury)	Ye Hai Mohabbatein	Ishita Bhalla	Won
2019	Best Actor in Lead Role Female (Popular)	Ye Hai Mohabbatein	Ishita Bhalla	Nominated
2019	Best Jodi (Popular) (With Karan Patel)	Ye Hai Mohabbatein	Ishita Bhalla	Nominated
2019	Television Personality of the Year	—N/a	—N/a	Won

== Apsara Awards ==
The Apsara Film & Television Producers Guild Awards are presented annually by members of the Apsara Producers Guild to honour Excellence in film and television.

Year	Category	Show	Character	Result
2008	Best Actress in a Drama Series	Banoo Main Teri Dulhann	Vidya Pratap Singh	Nominated
2015	Best Actress in a Drama Series	Ye Hai Mohabbatein	Ishita Bhalla	Nominated

== Gold Awards ==
The Zee Gold Awards (also known as the Gold Television or Boroplus Awards) are honours presented excellence in the television industry. The Awards are given in several categories.

Year	Category	Show	Character	Result
2007	Emami Golden Skin	—N/a	—N/a	Won
2008	Best Actress in a Lead Role	Ye Hai Mohabbatein	Ishita Bhalla	Won
2014	Boroplus Face of the Year	Ye Hai Mohabbatein	Ishita Bhalla	Won
2016	Boroplus Face of the Year	Ye Hai Mohabbatein	Ishita Bhalla	Won
2016	Best Actress in a Lead Role	Ye Hai Mohabbatein	Ishita Bhalla	Won
2016	Best Jodi (with Karan Patel)	Ye Hai Mohabbatein	Ishita Bhalla	Nominated
2017	Best Actress in a Lead Role	Ye Hai Mohabbatein	Ishita Bhalla	Won
2019	TV Personality of the Year	—N/a	—N/a	Won

== Iconic Gold Awards ==
Year	Category	Show	Character	Result
2022	Fearless Performance of the Year	Fear Factor: Khatron Ke Khiladi 11	—N/a	Won

== Asian Viewers Television Awards ==
Year	Category	Show	Character	Result
2015	Best Actress of the Year	Ye Hai Mohabbatein	Ishita Iyer Bhalla	Won

== BIG Star Entertainment Awards ==
Year	Category	Show	Character	Result
2014	Most Entertaining Actress - Fiction	Ye Hai Mohabbatein	Ishita Iyer Bhalla	Won

== Pinkvilla Screen and Style Icons Awards ==
Year	Category	Show	Character	Result
2023	Enigmatic Power Couple (with Vivek Dahiya)	—N/a	—N/a	Won

== Kalakar Awards ==
Year	Category	Show	Character	Result
2008	Best Actress Television	BANOO MEIN TERI DULHAN	Vidya	Won

== Honours ==
She was honoured with the Padma Shri Mahendra Kapoor Award at the ITSF (International Talent Society Film) Awards Ceremony in April 2025.
