= Ram Pyaare Sirf Humare =

Indian Sitcom Television seria

- Genre: Comedy
- Directed by: Sachin Mohite, Akshay Patil
- Starring: Nikhil Khurana; Jyoti Sharma; Shamin Mannan
- Theme music composer: Puneet Dixit Esha Gaur
- Composer: Puneet Dixit
- Country of origin: India
- Original language: Hindi
- No. of episodes: 58

Production
- Producer: Sachin Mohite
- Production location: Mumbai
- Camera setup: Multi camera
- Running time: 22 minutes (approx)
- Production company: Jasvand Entertainment

Original release
- Network: Zee TV
- Release: 5 October – 12 December 2020

Ram Pyaare Sirf Humare (transl. Dear Ram is just mine) is an Indian sitcom television series that premiered on 5 October 2020 on Zee TV. This shows involves Dulari (Jyoti Sharma), a young woman, is proud of having landed a charming husband, Ram (Nikhil Khurana). However, Dulari is highly possessive and wants to protect her husband Ram from the eyes of other women in the muhalla. The show was produced by Jasvand Entertainment. It replaces Ishq Subhan Allah in its timeslot.

== Plot ==
Ram, who runs a beauty parlour in Bhopal and while he provides the best beauty services in town, women also visit the parlour to gawk at him. While Ram is practically the Maryada Purushottam who doesn't give in to the flirtations coming his way, Dulari sees other women flirting with him as Surpanakhas. To ensure she keeps her man safe and away from the clutches of these surpanakhas, Dulari uses several tips and tricks to keep Ram close to her. She gets the nuskas to keep her husband to herself from a book given to her by her brother Patang and though she hilariously ends up creating trouble for Ram and herself every single time she turns to the book; she does not give up. Adding to the comedy of errors, Koel aims to befriend Ram and Dulari, break their marriage and steal Ram. While the wife is blissfully unaware of Koel's wicked plans, her actions and attempts to get close to Ram make Dulari question her intentions.

== Cast ==
- Nikhil Khurana as Ram: Ram runs a beauty parlour named after his wife (‘Ram Dulari Beauty Parlour’) in Bhopal, Madhya Pradesh. Ram is quite popular among the women for his skills and his handsomeness, but he has never looked at any woman that way except for his wife. His friends tease him about the same by calling him "sharif baccha”.
- Jyoti Sharma as Dulari: She is a woman who is head over heels in love with her husband Ram and equally possessive of him. She tries to protect her husband from other women with the help of various nuskhas. When Dulari’s brother gives her a book called Pati Ko Kabu Mein Rakhne Ke 151 Tarike, Dulari starts experimenting with every nuskhas on her husband, which creates hilarious situation between them.
- Shamin Mannan as Koyal.
- Mukesh Tripathi as Irfan bhai.
- Shiny Dixit as Cherry: Cherry is the young assistant who works at Ram's beauty parlour. She dreams of opening her own parlour and thus wants to take practical training by working for Ram. Cherry has been with Ram for two years, but shows no signs of leaving to start her own business. She feels that Ram is the best boss and she cannot betray him. Cherry is smitten by Ram's nature and has a lot of respect for him.
- Saawankumar Deepak Badgujar as Kinshuk: He played the lead comedy Villain 'Kinshuk', who enters the show as Koyal's brother who wants to marry Dulari.
- Pallavi Mukherjee as Menaka
- Unknown as Pratang: Dulari's brother Patang helps his sister by giving her the book Pati Ko Kabu Mein Rakhne Ke 151 Tarike. He tries his level best to solve his sister's marital issues and helps her with the nuskhas. Patang falls in love with Cherry and Dulari decides to get them married as her competition will reduce. However, the twist is that Patang looks exactly like Radha's to-be husband who ran away on the night of their wedding, and hence, Radha decides to give marriage another try and falls in love with Patang.
- Akshita Sethi as Radha Bai: She is the maid of the house, whose husband ran away on the day of the marriage. She believes all men are cheaters except for Ram. Radha feels Ram is the perfect man and adores him. She cannot say no to anything that Ram requests from her and this makes Dulari jealous.
