= Gold Award for Best Actress in a Lead Role =

Annual film award

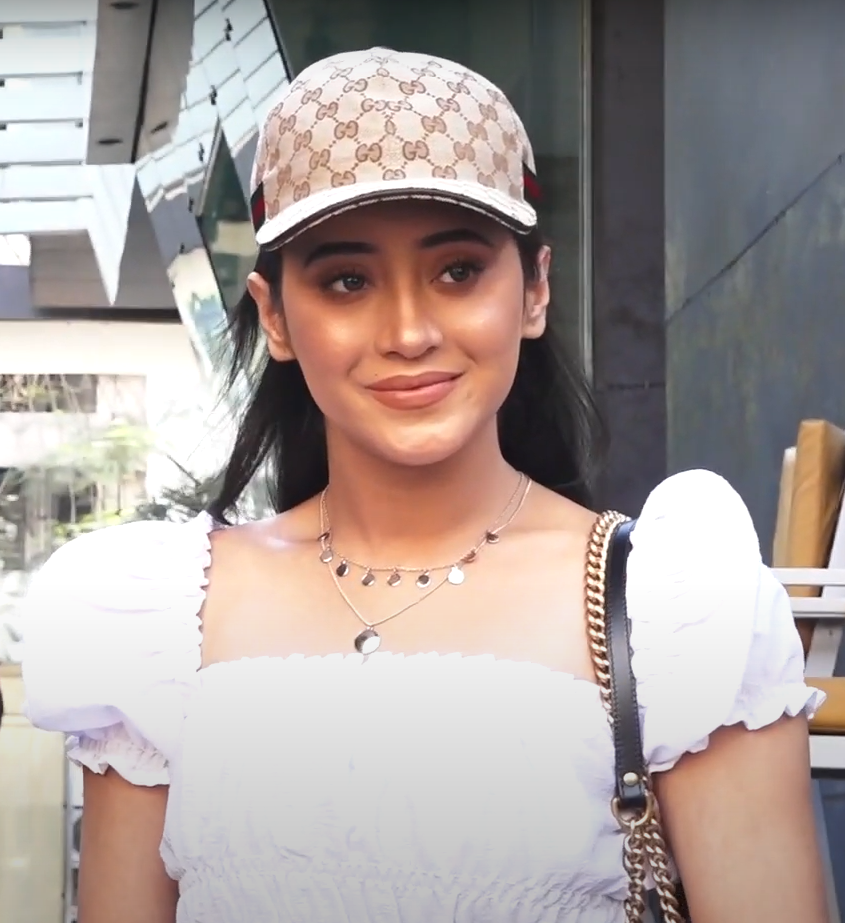
- 2019 recipient: Shivangi Joshi
- Awarded for: Best Performance by a Female Actor in a Lead Role on Television
- Country: India
- Presented by: White Leaf Entertainment
- First award: 2007 (for performances in TV shows in 2006)
- Currently held by: Shivangi Joshi for Yeh Rishta Kya Kehlata Hai and Shraddha Arya for Kundali Bhagya (Popular); Erica Fernandes for Kasautii Zindagii Kay (Jury)
- Website: goldawards.in

Gold Award for Best Actress in a Lead Role is an award given as part of its annual Gold Awards for TV serials.

The award was first awarded in 2007 under the title Best Actress in a Lead Role. A special award called Best Actor – Critics or Best Actor – Jury is also awarded occasionally since 2008, whose winner was selected by the jury of critics assigned to the function.

The jury award was awarded without prior nominations until 2010. Since then, the jury award is also awarded with prior nominations just like the original award which is now called Best Actress – Popular.

== Superlatives ==
| Superlative | Popular | | Overall (Popular + Jury) | |
|---|---|---|---|---|
| Actress with most awards | Divyanka Tripathi dahiya | 4 | Divyanka Tripathi Dahiya | 4 |
| Actress with most nominations | Sakshi Tanwar | 3 | Sakshi Tanwar | 5 |
| Actress with most nominations (without ever winning) | Hina Khan | 5 | Hina Khan | 6 |

- Divyanka Tripathi with four awards has the most wins, followed by Ankita Lokhande, Deepika Singh and Shraddha Arya with two wins each.
- Tripathi also holds the most nominations with six.
- Divyanka Tripathi holds the record of three wins for same role (Yeh Hai Mohobatein) under Best Actress category
- Rashami Desai holds most nominations in three different categories for same role (Uttaran), that is, for Best Actress (Popular), Best Actress (Critics) and Best Actress in a negative role (Popular), out of which Desai won the latter two.
- There have been four ties: between Ankita Lokhande and Mahi Vijj in 2011, Divyanka Tripathi and Mouni Roy in 2016, Sriti Jha and Shraddha Arya in 2018, and Shraddha Arya and Shivangi Joshi in 2019.

== Multiple nominations ==
- 6 Nominations: Divyanka Tripathi
- 5 Nominations: Sriti Jha
- 4 Nominations: Deepika Singh
- 3 Nominations: Hina Khan, Shweta Tiwari, Shivangi Joshi, Ankita Lokhande, Kratika Sengar
- 2 Nominations: Pooja Gor, Giaa Manek, Avika Gor, Sakshi Tanwar, Drashti Dhami, Sanaya Irani, Devoleena Bhattacharjee, Dipika Kakar, Mouni Roy, Surbhi Chandna, Shraddha Arya, Rubina Dilaik

== List of winners (Popular) ==
=== 2000s ===
- 2007 Rajshree Thakur - Saat Phere...Saloni Ka Safar as Saloni Singh
  - Prachi Desai - Kasamh Se as Bani Walia
  - Divyanka Tripathi Dahiya - Banoo Main Teri Dulhann as Vidya Pratap Singh
  - Priyanka Bassi - Left Right Left as Cadet Naina Singh Ahluwalia
  - Shweta Tiwari - Kasautii Zindagii Kay as Prerna Bajaj
  - Smriti Zubin Irani - Virrudh as Vasudha
- 2008 Divyanka Tripathi - Banoo Main Teri Dulhann as Vidya Pratap Singh / Divya
  - Parul Chauhan - Sapna Babul Ka...Bidaai as Ragini Ranvir Rajvansh
  - Sara Khan - Sapna Babul Ka...Bidaai as Sadhana Alekh Rajvansh
  - Additi Gupta - Kis Desh Mein Hai Meraa Dil as Heer Prem Juneja
  - Avika Gor - Balika Vadhu as Anandi Jagdish Singh
  - Shubhangi Atre Poorey - Kasturi as Kasturi Sabbarwal
- 2009 Not Held

=== 2010s ===
- 2010 Ratan Rajput - Agle Janam Mohe Bitiya Hi Kijo as Laali
  - Ragini Khanna - Sasural Genda Phool as Suhana Ishaan Kashyap
  - Hina Khan - Yeh Rishta Kya Kehlata Hai as Akshara Singhania
  - Tina Dutta - Uttaran as Ichha
  - Ankita Lokhande - Pavitra Rishta as Archana M. Deshmukh
  - Pooja Gor - Mann Kee Awaaz Pratigya as Pratigya
- 2011 Ankita Lokhande - Pavitra Rishta as Archana Manav Deshmukh (tied with) Mahhi Vij - Laagi Tujhse Lagan as Nakusha
  - Anupriya Kapoor - Tere Liye as Taani Anurag Ganguly
  - Pooja Gor - Mann Kee Awaaz Pratigya as Pratigya
  - Hina Khan - - Yeh Rishta Kya Kehlata Hai as Akshara Singhania
  - Rashami Desai - Uttaran as Tapasya Bundela
  - Giaa Manek - Saath Nibhaana Saathiya as Gopi Ahem Modi
- 2012 Ankita Lokhande - Pavitra Rishta as Archana Manav Deshmukh
  - Giaa Manek - Saath Nibhaana Saathiya as Gopi Ahem Modi
  - Hina Khan - Yeh Rishta Kya Kehlata Hai as Akshara Singhania
  - Pratyusha Banerjee - Balika Vadhu — Kachchi Umar Ke Pakke Rishte as Anandi Jagdish Singh
  - Sakshi Tanwar - Bade Achhe Lagte Hain as Priya Ram Kapoor
  - Shweta Tiwari - Parvarrish – Kuchh Khattee Kuchh Meethi as Sweety Maya Ahluwalia
- 2013 Deepika Singh - Diya Aur Baati Hum as Sandhya Rathi
  - Sanaya Irani - Iss Pyaar Ko Kya Naam Doon? as Khushi Kumari Gupta Singh Raizada
  - Drashti Dhami - Madhubala – Ek Ishq Ek Junoon as Madhubala Kundra
  - Sakshi Tanwar - Bade Achhe Lagte Hain as Priya Ram Kapoor
  - Rachana Parulkar - Ek Mutthi Aasmaan as Kalpana Jadhav
  - Shweta Tiwari - Parvarrish – Kuchh Khattee Kuchh Meethi as Sweety Maya Ahluwalia
  - Avika Gor - Sasural Simar Ka as Roli Siddhanth Bharadwaj
  - Kratika Sengar - Punar Vivaah as Aarti Yash Sindhia
- 2014 Deepika Singh - Diya Aur Baati Hum as Sandhya Rathi
  - Sanaya Irani - Rangrasiya as Parvati
  - Drashti Dhami - Madhubala – Ek Ishq Ek Junoon as Madhubala Kundra
  - Divyanka Tripathi - Yeh Hai Mohabbatein as Dr. Ishita Raman Bhalla
  - Pooja Sharma - Mahabharat as Draupadi
  - Paridhi Sharma - Jodha Akbar as Jodha
- 2015 Divyanka Tripathi - Yeh Hai Mohabbatein as Dr. Ishita Raman Bhalla
  - Sriti Jha - Kumkum Bhagya as Pragya Arora
  - Devoleena Bhattacharjee - Saath Nibhaana Saathiya as Gopi Modi
  - Pallavi Kulkarni - Itna Karo Na Mujhe Pyar as Ragini Nachiket Khanna
  - Deepika Singh - Diya Aur Baati Hum as Sandhya Rathi
  - Toral Rasputra - Balika Vadhu as Anandi Shivraj Shekhar
  - Dipika Kakar - Sasural Simar Ka as Simar Prem Bharadwaj
- 2016 Divyanka Tripathi - Yeh Hai Mohabbatein as Dr. Ishita Raman Bhalla (tied with) Mouni Roy - Naagin (season 1) as Shivanya Ritik Singh
  - Sriti Jha - Kumkum Bhagya as Pragya Arora
  - Kratika Sengar - Kasam - Tere Pyaar Ki as Tanu Rishi Singh Bedi
  - Devoleena Bhattacharjee - Saath Nibhaana Saathiya as Gopi Modi
  - Deepika Singh - Diya Aur Baati Hum as Sandhya Rathi
  - Dipika Kakar - Sasural Simar Ka as Simar Prem Bharadwaj
- 2017 Divyanka Tripathi - Yeh Hai Mohabbatein as Dr. Ishita Raman Bhalla
  - Sriti Jha - Kumkum Bhagya as Pragya Arora
  - Kratika Sengar - Kasam - Tere Pyaar Ki as Tanuja Rishi Singh Bedi
  - Mouni Roy - Naagin (season 2) as Shivangi Rocky Pratap Singh
  - Devoleena Bhattacharjee - Saath Nibhaana Saathiya as Gopi Modi
  - Surbhi Chandna - Ishqbaaz as Annika Shivaay Singh Oberoi
  - Shivangi Joshi - Yeh Rishta Kya Kehlata Hai as Naira Kartik Goenka
- 2018 Sriti Jha - Kumkum Bhagya as Pragya Mehra (tied with) Shraddha Arya - Kundali Bhagya as Dr. Preeta Arora
  - Shivangi Joshi - Yeh Rishta Kya Kehlata Hai as Naira Kartik Goenka
  - Jennifer Winget - Bepanaah as Zoya
  - Rubina Dilaik - Shakti - Astitva Ke Ehsaas Ki as Saumya Harman Singh
  - Surbhi Chandna - Ishqbaaz as Annika Shivaay Singh Oberoi
- 2019 Shraddha Arya - Kundali Bhagya as Dr. Preeta Arora (tied with) Shivangi Joshi - Yeh Rishta Kya Kehlata Hai as Naira Kartik Goenka
  - Sriti Jha - Kumkum Bhagya as Pragya Arora
  - Rhea Sharma - Yeh Rishtey Hain Pyaar Ke as Mishti Abir Rajvansh
  - Erica Fernandes - Kasautii Zindagii Kay (2018 TV series) as Prerna Sharma
  - Rubina Dilaik - Shakti - Astitva Ke Ehsaas Ki as Saumya Harman Singh
  - Surbhi Jyoti - Naagin (season 3) as Bela Mahir Sehgal
