= Sharad Malhotra =

Indian film and television actor (born 1983)

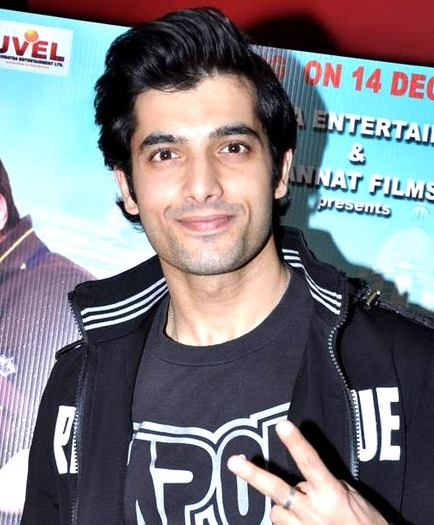
- Malhotra in 2015
- Born: 9 January 1983 (age 43); Kolkata, West Bengal, India
- Other name: Ssharad Malhotra
- Education: St. Xavier's College
- Occupation: Actor
- Years active: 2004–present
- Known for: Banoo Main Teri Dulhann; Bharat Ka Veer Putra – Maharana Pratap; Kasam Tere Pyaar Ki; Naagin 5
- Spouse: Ripci Bhatia (m. 2019)

Sharad Malhotra (born 9 January 1983) is an Indian actor, who primarily works in Hindi television and Hindi films. He made his acting debut in 2004 with the role of Prince Goldy in Princess Dollie Aur Uska Magic Bag. His first major role was the lead role of Sagarpratap Singh in Banoo Main Teri Dulhann.

Sharad had his breakthrough with the role of Maharana Pratap Singh in Bharat Ka Veer Putra – Maharana Pratap and is noted for his portrayal of Rishi Singh Bedi in Kasam Tere Pyaar Ki and Veeranshu Singhania in Naagin 5.

He made his film debut in 2012 with From Sydney with Love.

== Early life ==
Sharad Malhotra was born and brought up in Kolkata on 9 January 1983, he did his B.Com from St. Xavier's College. In 2003, he won Face Of The Year in Kolkata from where his journey started.

Besides modeling and acting, Sharad is also enthusiastic about cricket, kickboxing, horse riding, and swimming.

== Personal life ==
He dated actress Divyanka Tripathi for seven years before they broke up in 2015.

He then dated actress Pooja Bisht, for almost two years but they broke up in 2018.

He married Ripci Bhatia on 20 April 2019.

== Career ==
=== 2004–2013: Debut and early career ===
Malhotra attending acting workshop and did modelling after he came to Mumbai. He was the first male model to do a jewellery campaign. Malhotra started his career with India's Best Cinestars Ki Khoj as a Contestant in 2004. He then made his acting debut in the same year as Prince Goldy in Princess Dollie Aur Uska Magic Bag and had a cameo in Kabhie To Nazar Milao.

He had his first major role in 2006 with Banoo Main Teri Dulhan where he played the lead role of Sagar and Amar opposite Divyanka Tripathi. The show was successful. The show ended in mid-2009. In 2008, he was also a part of a dance reality show named Yeh hai Jalwa, which had various popular television celebrities, including Ronit Roy, Shweta Tiwari and Rakhi Sawant.

Then he took a break from his TV career and went on to attend New York Film Academy in the year 2009. In 2010, he appeared as a contestant on Nachle Ve with Saroj Khan. In 2012, He made his film debut with the role of Rohit Khurana in From Sydney with Love.

=== 2014–2020: Breakthrough and success ===
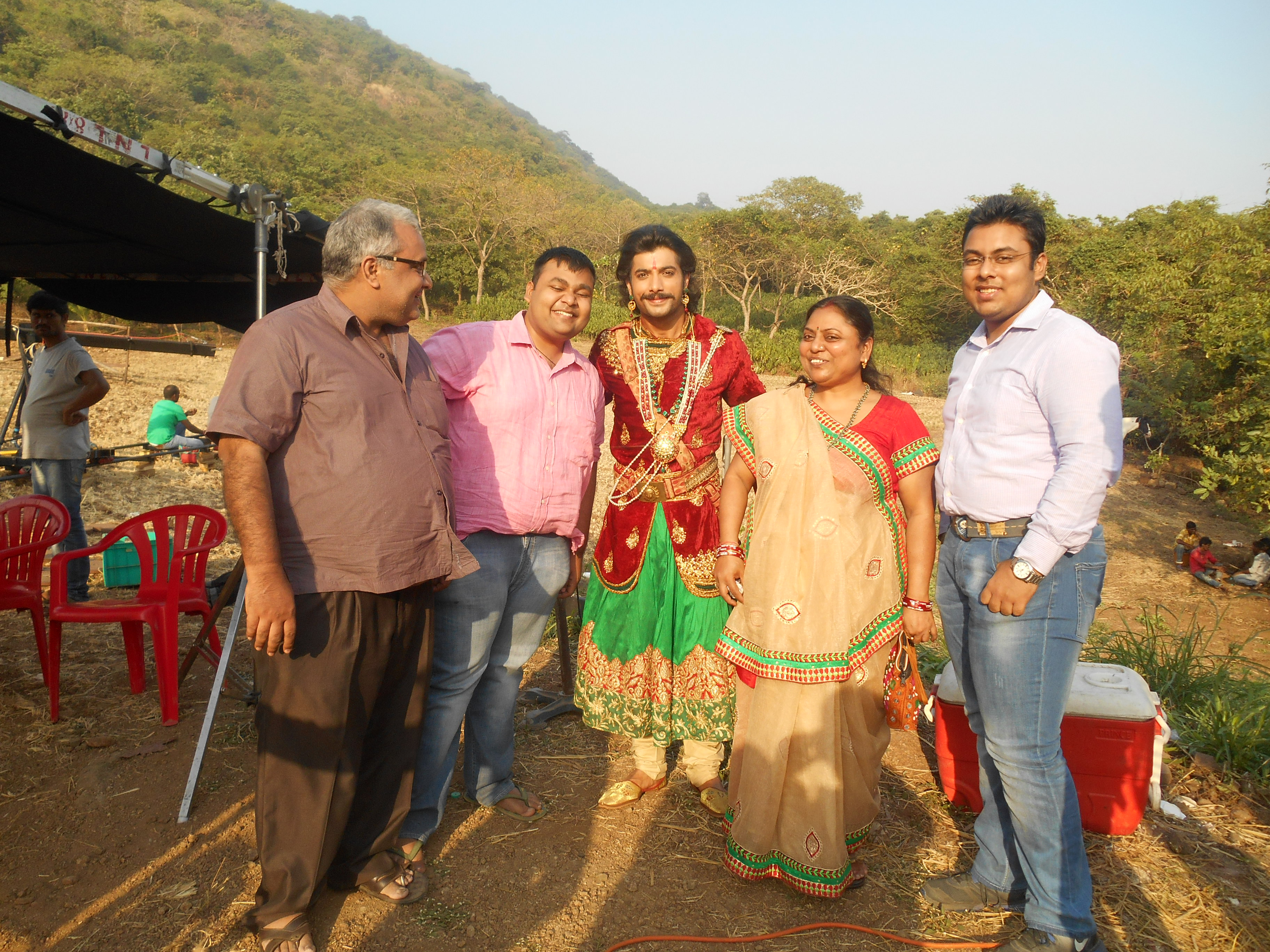
Sharad with fans on Maharana Pratap set

In 2014, he played Prakash in Pankaj Dheer's movie My Father Godfather opposite Kratika Sengar, which was India's first webfilm ever. Aditya Pancholi and Johnny Lever had special appearance in this movie. Sharad returned to television in 2015 and had his breakthrough with the role of Maharana Pratap in Sony TV's Bharat Ka Veer Putra – Maharana Pratap opposite Rachana Parulkar. The show ended in the same year, it was successful and received praises, also winning awards. While working on this show, he also participated in Box Cricket League season 1 and was the Captain of Kolkata Baabu Moshayes in season 2.

In 2016, Malhotra played the lead role of Rishi Singh Bedi and Ranbir Kapoor in the show Kasam Tere Pyaar Ki. It was him working with Kratika Sengar and Vijay Kashyap for the second time after My Father Godfather. Due to its popularity, it was also broadcast in the UK and many other countries, and also was dubbed in many other Indian and international languages. His chemistry with Kratika brought him more popularity and awards. This show wrapped up a while after completing 2 years.

Another Hindi film was released in 2016 called Ek Tera Saath, where Malhotra played the lead character Kunwar Aditya Pratap Singh. He also appeared as a guest on Comedy Nights Bachao and later as a contestant. In 2017, he appeared in his first music video Paas Baitho Na. He next portrayed Raunak Singh in Rashmi Sharma's Muskaan from 2018 to 2020.

=== 2021–present: Acclaim and further career ===
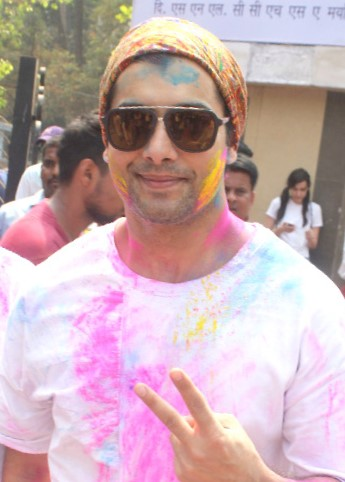
Sharad at a Holi party

In August 2020, he joined the cast of Naagin 5, portraying the prince of shape-shifting cheels named Veeranshu Singhania. Malhotra played the role as the Grey Shaded hero opposite Surbhi Chandna. The show wrapped up in February 2021.

In March 2021, his music video Bepanah Pyar with Vyrl Originals was released, followed by Beypanah Ishq in August 2021. His chemistry with Surbhi was also very celebrated by the audience. In the same year he appeared with Helly Shah in a peppy song Halo Re Halo and with Adaa Khan in a romantic song Door Ho Gaya.

In October 2021, he started portraying the role of Bakshi Jagabandhu in StarPlus's historical drama Vidrohi. It was his second historic character. The show went off-air after 5 month in March 2022. In February 2022, he appeared in a short film Not Out along with Karan Wahi, where they both played the role of two best friends.

== In the media ==
In 2021, he won the Iwmbuzz Award for Trendsetter of the Year.

He was also ranked number 7 in The Times Most Desirable Men on TV 2020.

In 2023, he was awarded the Best Foreign Actor at the Blue star Awards, Vietnam for Naagin 5.

== Filmography ==
=== Television ===
Year	Title	Role	Notes
2004	India's Best Cinestars Ki Khoj	Himself	Contestant
2004	Princess Dollie Aur Uska Magic Bag	Prince Goldy	
2004	Kabhie To Nazar Milao	Unnamed	Cameo
2006–2009	Banoo Main Teri Dulhann	Sagar Pratap Singh / Amar Upadhyay	Main Lead
2008	Yeh Hai Jalwa	Himself	Contestant
2010	Nachle Ve with Saroj Khan	Himself	Contestant
2014–2015	Bharat Ka Veer Putra – Maharana Pratap	Maharana Pratap Singh	Main Lead
2014–2015	Box Cricket League 1	Himself	Contestant
2016	Box Cricket League 2	Himself	Contestant
2016–2018	Kasam Tere Pyaar Ki	Rishi Singh Bedi / Ranbir Kapoor	Main Lead
2016–2017	Comedy Nights Bachao	Himself	Guest, later Contestant
2018–2020	Muskaan	Raunak Singh	Main Lead
2020	Bigg Boss 14	Veeranshu "Veer" Singhania	Guest
2020-2021	Naagin 5	Veeranshu "Veer" Singhania	Main Lead
2021–2022	Vidrohi	Baxi Jagabandhu	Main Lead

=== Films ===
Year	Title	Role	Notes
2012	From Sydney with Love	Rohit Khurana	Debut in Bollywood
2014	My Father Godfather	Prakash	
2016	Ek Tera Saath	Kunwar Aditya Pratap Singh	

=== Short film ===
Year	Title	Role	Notes
2018	She's D One	Shaurya	
2018	Prem, Gajra Aur Chilli Chicken		Directorial Debut
2020	Pasta	Anant	
2022	Butterflies: Not Out	Abhay	Season 3; Episode 5
2022	The Hindu Boy	Main Pandit Boy	
2023	Thanks Mom	Rohan	
2024	Pravaah	Shivoham	
2024	Denial	Siddharth	

=== Web series ===
Year	Title	Role	Notes	Ref.
2020	Kashmakash: Kya Sahi Kya Galat	Pankaj	Episode: Rampur Rocks	
2022	Ratri Ke Yatri 2	Manoj	Episode 5: Kanya Dosh	
2023	Honey Trap Squad	Mirage	Season 1	
2024	Jai Jagannath	Lord Krishna		
2025	Ek Anjaan Rishtey Ka Guilt 4	Vikram Ahuja		
2025	Deewana Aashiq	Mohan		
2025	Galat	Dev Kapoor	Season 1	
2025	Galat 2	Dev Kapoor	Season 2	
2025	Yeh Hai Sanak	Inspector Pradeep Singh		
2026	ACP Vikrant	ACP Vikrant		
2026	Missing Mahi	Sameer		
2026	Accidental Wife	Abhimanyu Ahuja		
2026	Surkh	SHO Arun Kumar		
2026	IPS Rudra	Sharad Malhotra		

=== Music videos ===
Year	Title	Singer(s)	Ref.
2017	Paas Baitho Na	Ramasubhramanian CV	
2018	Jiya Lagena	Krishna Beura	
2021	Bepanah Pyaar	Yasser Desai, Payal Dev	
2021	Bepanah Ishq	Yasser Desai, Payal Dev	
2021	Halo Re Halo	Mika Singh, Payal Dev	
2021	Idhar Dekho	Amit Mishra	
2021	Door Ho Gaya	Akhil Sachdeva	
2022	Eni Qismat	Jules	
2023	Tauba Meri Tauba	Mamta Sharma	
2023	Baarishon	Udit Narayan, Payal Dev	
2023	Ghafil	Altamash Faridi	
2023	Aye Baarish	Altamash Faridi	
2023	Naughty Balma	Arun Yadav, Sanjeev Chaturvedi, Biswaa	
2023	Nasha Tera	Kunal Sachdeva, Jyotica Tangri	
2023	Kaali Kaali Raaton Mein	Kumar Sanu	
2023	Ganraj	Nanu Gurjar	
2024	Love & Latte (Beh Ja Mere Kol)	Altamash Faridi	
2024	Regret (Afsos)	Altamash Faridi	
2024	Teri Aadat Ab Nahi	Altamash Faridi	
2024	Izhar-E-Mohabbat	Altamash Faridi	Album: Sheesha
2024	Saaf Pata Chalta Hai	Altamash Faridi	Album: Sheesha
2024	Kya Sheesha Dekh Paoge	Nakash Aziz	Album: Sheesha
2024	Adhoori Daastan	Sahil Kulkarni	
2024	Mere Pyare Hindustan	Raj Barman	
2024	Chalo Ayodhya Dham	Nitin Kumar	
2024	Dil Nisar Hua	Javed Ali	
2024	Tumse Pyaar Hua	Mohammad Irfan, Ishita Vishwakarma	
2024	Dil Ko Sukoon	Tawab Noor	
2024	Aakhri Mulakat	Javed Ali, Mairien James	
2024	Kuch Pal	Bharat Sharma	
2024	Baarisha	Shubh Inder	
2025	Jai Bhavani Jai Shivaji	Kailash Kher	
2026	Saah	Vanitaa Pande	

== Awards and nominations ==
Year	Award	Category	Show	Role	Result
2007	Indian Telly Awards	Best Onscreen Couple (with Divyanka Tripathi)	Banoo Main Teri Dulhann	Sagar Pratap Singh/Amar Upadhay	Won
2007	Indian Telly Awards	Best Actor Male (Critics)	Banoo Main Teri Dulhann	Sagar Pratap Singh/Amar Upadhay	Won
2007	Gold Awards	Best Debut (Male)	Banoo Main Teri Dulhann	Sagar Pratap Singh/Amar Upadhay	Won
2008	Indian Telly Awards	Best Actor Male (Popular)	Banoo Main Teri Dulhann	Sagar Pratap Singh/Amar Upadhay	Won
2015	Indian Telly Awards	Best Actor in a Lead Role	Bharat Ka Veer Putra - Maharana Pratap	Maharana Pratap	Nominated
2016	Gold Awards	Best Onscreen Couple (With Kratika Sengar)	Kasam Tere Pyaar Ki	Rishi Singh Bedi/Ranbir Kapoor	Won
2018	Gold Awards	Best Actor	Kasam Tere Pyaar Ki	Rishi Singh Bedi/Ranbir Kapoor	Nominated
2018	Gold Awards	Best Onscreen Jodi (With Kratika Sengar)	Kasam Tere Pyaar Ki	Rishi Singh Bedi/Ranbir Kapoor	Won
2018	Asian Viewers Television Awards	Male Actor Of The Year	Kasam Tere Pyaar Ki	Rishi Singh Bedi/Ranbir Kapoor	Nominated
2020	Gold Glam and Style Awards	Best Dressed Actor (Male) TV	—N/a	—N/a	Won
2020	Dadasaheb Phalke Icon Award	Best Actor TV	Naagin 5	Veeranshu "Veer" Singhania	Won
2021	Iconic Gold Award	Most Popular TV Actor	Naagin 5	Veeranshu "Veer" Singhania	Won
2021	Chatrapati Shivaji Maharaj Gaurav Award	Best Actor TV	—N/a	—N/a	Won
2021	IWMBuzz Style Awards	Trendsetter of The Year (Male)	—N/a	—N/a	Won
2021	Mumbai Achievers Award	Most Fit & Fabulous Actor	—N/a	—N/a	Won
2021	International Iconic Award	Best Jodi in Historical series (with Sulagna Panigrahi)	Vidrohi	Baxi Jagabandhu	Won
2021	Dadasaheb Phalke Icon Award	Best Actor of Indian Television (Male) & Performer of The Year	Vidrohi	Baxi Jagabandhu	Won
2022	Empower Business Award	—N/a	Vidrohi	Baxi Jagabandhu	Won
2022	Netaji Subhash Chandra Bose Noble Peace Award	—N/a	Vidrohi	Baxi Jagabandhu	Won
2022	Iconic Gold Award	Trustworthy Actor	—N/a	—N/a	Won
2022	Satyajit Ray Icon Cinema Award	Best Actor (Male)	—N/a	—N/a	Won
2022	Star Eminence Award	Best Actor	—N/a	—N/a	Won
2022	Uttar Pradesh Artist Academy (UPAA) Award		—N/a	—N/a	Won
2022	International Iconic Award (IIA)	Versatile Actor of Indian Television	—N/a	—N/a	Won
2022	Mumbai Global Achievers Award	Best Actor	—N/a	—N/a	Won
2022	Pillars of Maharashtra Awards	—N/a	—N/a	—N/a	Won
2022	Dadasaheb Phalke Indian Television Awards	—N/a	—N/a	—N/a	Won
2022	Dadasaheb Phalke Icon Award	Best Actor (TV)	—N/a	—N/a	Won
2023	Rashtriya Abhimaan Puraskar	Most Versatile Actor	—N/a	—N/a	Won
2023	International Iconic Award (IIA)	International Iconic Promising Actor 2022	—N/a	—N/a	Won
2023	Pride of Nation	Iconic Actor of Television Industry			Won
2023	Yatha Katha Film & Literature Festival	Best Actor	Thanks Mom	Rohan	Won
2023	The 7th Chambal International Film Festival	Best 2nd Actor	Thanks Mom	Rohan	Won
2026	International Iconic Award (IIA)	Entertainment Icon of the Year			Won
