= 108: Base Hospital Uri =

Indian medical romance television series

- Genre: Medical; Action; Romance
- Created by: Chanddni Arya
- Written by: Dialogue; Ritu Bhatia; Lyrics; Aman Pant
- Screenplay by: Sudhir Singh
- Story by: Faizal Akhtar; Jayant Gupta
- Directed by: Shachindra Vats; Sahil Rakesh Groka
- Starring: Erica Fernandes; Gashmeer Mahajani; Nikhil Khurana
- Theme music composer: Nipun Malhotra
- Composer: Elvis Valentine
- Country of origin: India
- Original language: Hindi
- No. of seasons: 1
- No. of episodes: 30

Production
- Executive producers: Kiran Kadam; Ajay Verekar
- Producers: Aditya Pittie; Samar Khan; Chanddni Arya; Sameer Arya
- Production locations: Bhaderwah; Kashmir
- Cinematography: Shanu Singh Rajput; Dinesh Kanojiya; Raja Puthran
- Editors: Satya Sharma; Sumanth Sharma
- Camera setup: Multi-camera
- Running time: 30–40 minutes
- Production companies: The Epic Company; A-Game Entertainment

Original release
- Network: Colors TV
- Release: 15 August – 22 November 2026

108: Base Hospital Uri is an Indian Hindi-language medical military romantic drama television series premiered on 15 August 2026 to 22 November 2026 on Colors TV and streams digitally on JioHotstar. Produced by Samar Khan under The Epic Company and co-produced by Chandni Arya for A-Game Entertainment, starring Erica Fernandes, Gashmeer Mahajani and Nikhil Khurana.

== Plot ==
Dr. Major Anirudh Jaiswal, who arrives in Uri to serve at 108 Base Hospital. Anirudh carries a heavy burden of guilt, believing himself responsible for the accident involving his brother and sister-in-law that left their children orphaned. Although he has taken on the responsibility of raising them, earning their acceptance remains an uphill battle.

His arrival in Uri also brings him face-to-face with Dr. Major Naina Sanyal, the woman he once loved during their college days. The two went their separate ways after Anirudh disapproved of Naina’s decision to join the army. His reservations stem from his own childhood, having grown up feeling the absence of his mother, who serves as a brigadier in the army.

Rekindling their romance, however, won’t be straight forward. Major Sameer Dixit is deeply in love with Naina, despite her continued hesitation towards him. This creates an interesting dynamic between the three characters and leaves viewers wondering who Naina will ultimately choose.

== Cast ==
=== Main ===
- Erica Fernandes as Dr. Major Naina Sanwal
- Gashmeer Mahajani as Dr. Major Anirudh Jaiswal
- Nikhil Khurana as Major Sameer Dixit
- Ayoshi Talukdar as Dr. Captain Mili Banerjee

=== Recurring ===
- Hiten Tejwani as Dr. Col. Suryakant Thakur
- Smita Bansal as Lt. Col. Principal Matron Kavita Jha
- Arham Zaidi as Captain Akash Kumar(Dead)
- Yashi Saxena as Captain Jhanvi Nambiar (Dead)
- Pavneet Singh Bagga as Captain Nirvair Singh
- Massheuddin Qureshi as Wali Bhai
- Ashmita Bakshi as Anitha Solanki
- Aliraza Namdar as Panther
- Vidyasagar Bagde as Bhediya

=== Special appearances ===
- Shaleen Malhotra as Lt. Col. Teghbir Singh Sandhu
- Shaheer Sheikh as Dr. Ved Gupta

== Production ==
=== Development ===
The military‑medical drama draws inspiration from a real medical facility in Kashmir that saved wounded personnel.

=== Casting ===
Erica Fernandes was signed for the role of Dr. Major Naina Sanwal, and marks her television comeback after a 5 year hiatus. Nikhil Khurana was confirmed to play Major Sameer Dixit. Smita Bansal was selected to portray Lt. Col Principal Matron Kavita Jha. Hiten Tejwani was cast to portray Dr. Col. Suryakant Thakur. Shaleen Malhotra was hired to portray Tegvir.

=== Release ===
Colors TV unveiled the first promo in July 2026. It was launched as weekend limited series at 8.00 p.m. slot premiering with India's Independence Day.

=== Filming ===
The primary filming location is a constructed realistic replica of the military base hospital in Bhaderwah. The crew filmed intense rescue and combat scenes across remote, mountainous forests and rugged landscapes in Kashmir.

== Awards and nominations ==
Year	Award	Category	Recipient	Result	Ref.
2026	Indian Television Academy Awards	Best Serial - Drama - TV	108: Best Hospital Uri	Pending	
2026	Indian Television Academy Awards	Best Actor Drama - TV	Gashmeer Mahajani	Pending	
2026	Indian Television Academy Awards	Best Director - Drama - TV	Shachindraa Vats	Pending	
2026	Indian Television Academy Awards	Best Story - TV	Faizal Akhtar	Pending	
2026	Indian Television Academy Awards	Best Teleplay - TV	Sudhir Singh	Pending	
