= Nikhil Khurana =

Indian actor

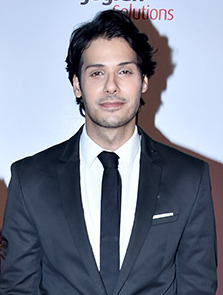
- Khurana at Dadasaheb Phalke Film Foundation 2018 awards
- Born: 18 January 1988 (age 38)
- Occupations: Actor; model
- Years active: 2014–present

Nikhil Khurana is an Indian actor who has appeared in TV shows including Pyaar Tune Kya Kiya, Yeh Hai Aashiqui, Kasam Tere Pyaar Ki, Tere Liye Bro and Jijaji Chhat Per Hain. In 2020, he appeared in Ram Pyaare Sirf Humare as Ram, the cynosure of every women.

== Early life ==
Khurana belongs to an army family, born and brought up all over India, though most of his education was in Chandigarh. He completed his bachelor's (in commerce) from DAV College, Chandigarh Sector 10, and while in college he was equally inclined towards cultural activities and youth fests. Known for its vibrant cultural group, the college encouraged his enthusiasm to participate in dance and modelling. He has an MBA from SIMS Pune and worked with Marsh for about two years prior to joining the film industry. He also worked in some ad films like Videocon 4K Ultra HD.

== Filmography ==
=== Film ===
Key
†	Denotes films that have not yet been released

Film performances
Year	Title	Role	Language	Ref(s)
2017	Noor	Rahul Parekh	Hindi	
2022	Sanaa	Akash	Hindi	
2024	Murder Mubarak	Warden Ashok	Hindi	

=== Television ===
Year	Title	Role	Notes	Ref(s)
2014	Yeh Hai Aashiqui	Varun		
2015	Pyaar Tune Kya Kiya	Aftab		
2015	Pyaar Marriage Shhhh	Joy	Lead role	
2016–2017	Kasam Tere Pyaar Ki	Nakul Singh Bedi		
2017	MTV Big F	Karan		
2017–2018	Tere Liye Bro	Vineet	Lead role	
2018–2020	Jijaji Chhat Per Hain	Pancham Khurana	Lead role	
2020	Ram Pyaare Sirf Humare	Ram	Lead role	
2026	108 Base Hospital – Uri	Major Sameer Dixit		

=== Web series ===
Year	Title	Role	Notes	Ref(s)
2024	Pill	Ekam Gill		
2025	Lovely Lolla	Arjun Malhotra		
