= Lovely Lolla =

2024 Indian romantic family drama series

- Genre: Romance; Drama
- Created by: Sargun Mehta; Ravi Dubey
- Written by: Munisha Rajpal
- Directed by: Abhijit Das
- Creative directors: Rohit Anand; Shweta Mishra
- Starring: Isha Malviya; Gauahar Khan; Nikhil Khurana
- Country of origin: India
- Original language: Hindi
- No. of seasons: 1
- No. of episodes: 36

Production
- Executive producers: Sargun Mehta; Ravi Dubey; Srman Jain; Preet Rajput
- Editors: Dharmesh Patel; Shadab Khan
- Camera setup: Multi-camera
- Running time: 30-40 minutes
- Production company: Dreamiyata Dramaa

Original release
- Network: YouTube
- Release: 25 December 2024 – 1 May 2025

Lovely Lolla is an Indian Hindi-language romantic comedy drama series produced by Sargun Mehta and Ravi Dubey for their entertainment channel Dreamiyata Dramaa. It stars Isha Malviya, Gauahar Khan and Nikhil Khurana as Lovely Chaddha, Lolla Chawla and Arjun Malhotra. The series aired from 25 December 2024 to 1 May 2025 on YouTube.

== Plot ==
Lovely and Lolla are a mother-daughter duo with a complicated relationship. Lovely and Lolla are full of life but not with each other. Dilemma occurs when their bond sees the real battle as they both set their sights on the same person Arjun. Watch them as their love, rivalry, and family drama unfold in this rollercoaster series with lots of fun, comedy and real entertainment. Lovely is a 21 year old employee who works at Mantraz to pay the bills and keep things afloat. Lolla is a 39 year old film star and Lovely's mother. Arjun is a 37 year old businessman and the CEO of Mantraz.

== Cast ==
=== Main ===
- Isha Malviya as Lovely Chaddha: Employee at Mantraz, Lolla and Raja's daughter, Arjun's lover
  - Kiara Yadav as Young Lovely Chaddha
- Gauahar Khan as Vaishnavi "Lolla" Chawla: Film star, Shakuntala's daughter, Raja's former wife, Lovely's mother
  - Cheshta Ahuja as Young Vaishnavi "Lolla" Chawla
- Nikhil Khurana as Arjun Malhotra: CEO of Mantraz, Amit's son, Sarika's brother, Lovely's lover
  - Ansh Tejpal as Young Arjun Malhotra

=== Recurring ===
- Dolly Ahluwalia as Shakuntala Chawla: Lolla's mother, Lovely's grandmother
  - Shefali Rana as Young Shakuntala Chawla
- Ravi Kothari as Raja Chaddha: Lolla's former husband, Lovely and Neelu's father, Mona's husband,
- Dilraj Uday as Mona Chaddha: Raja's wife, Lovely's stepmother, Neelu's mother
- Sanjana Solanki as Sarika Malhotra: Amit's daughter, Arjun's sister
- Chandan Nilwar as Amit Malhotra: Arjun and Sarika's father
- Raman Dagga as Mr. Chawla: Shakuntala's husband, Lolla's father, Lovely's grandfather
- Riddhima Nagpal as Neelu Chaddha: Mona and Raja's daughter, Lovely's half-sister
- Kanika Wadhwa as Megha, Employee at Mantraz
- Mamta Rana as Suraksha, Manager at Mantraz

== Production ==
=== Release and casting ===
The trailer of the series was released on 14 December 2024 and the first episode aired on 25 December 2024. Isha Malviya was cast to play Lovely Chaddha, a simple and sharp girl who has never received love from her parents. Gauahar Khan was cast as Vaishnavi "Lolla" Chawla, an actress and star who does not value other people's emotions and leaves her own daughter behind. Dolly Ahluwalia plays Shakuntala Chawla, Lolla's mother and Lovely's grandmother. Nikhil Khurana plays Arjun Malhotra, Lovely's boss and love interest as well as Lolla's former one-sided lover who she left years ago.

=== Soundtrack ===
The official soundtrack of Lovely Lolla has the two songs. Pyaar Nna Paundi features Isha and Nikhil as Lovely and Arjun. Naam Hai Lolla Ji focuses on Gauahar as Lolla.
