= Ek Tera Saath =

2016 Indian horror film by Arshad Siddiqui

1:13:7 Ek Tera Saath
- Theatrical release poster
- Directed by: Arshad Siddiqui
- Written by: Zuhaebb & Arshad siddiqui
- Produced by: Eyefaa Studio; Pradeep K Sharma; V. Nazareth
- Starring: Sharad Malhotra; Hritu Dudani; Melanie Nazareth; Vishwajeet Pradhan; Deepraj Rana; Gurpreet Ghuggi; Aprajita; Ashish Vidyarthi
- Cinematography: Ravi Bhat
- Music by: Sunil Singh; Liyakat Ajmeri; Ali -Anirudh
- Production company: Baba Motion Pictures
- Release date: 21 October 2016
- Country: India
- Language: Hindi

Ek Tera Saath (transl. One with you) is a 2016 Indian horror film. The film is directed by Arshad Siddiqui starring Sharad Malhotra, Hritu Dudani and Melanie Nazareth in lead roles and was released on 21 October 2016. Ek Tera Saath is a romantic film with a bit of supernatural element. It has been shot in Ghanerao, Jaisalmer, Jodhpur, Delhi, Chandigarh, Shimla and Mumbai. The trailer and its songs were released on 16 September 2016.

== Cast ==
- Sharad Malhotra as Kuwar Aditya Pratap Singh
- Hritu Dudani as Kasturi / Nikita
- Melanie Nazareth as Sonali
- Vishwajeet Pradhan as Dev # 1
- Deepraj Rana ad Dev # 2
- Gurpreet Ghuggi as Clown in Circus
- Aprajita as Kuwar Rani Singh
- Ashish Vidyarthi as Dev # 3
- Pankaj Berry as Acp Sanjeev Khanna

== Music ==
The music is composed by Sunil Singh, Liyakat Ajmeri & Ali -Anirudh. The soundtrack of Ek Tera Saath was released on 16 September 2016 by Zee Music on YouTube. The songs are sung by Rahat Fateh Ali Khan & K.K.

Track listing
No.	Title	Lyrics	Music	Singer(s)	Length
1.	"Aye Mere Khuda"	A. M. Turaz	Liyakat Ajmerili	Rahat Fateh Ali Khan, Swati Sharma	4:55
2.	"Ek Tera Saath"	Devendra Kafir	Sunil Singh	Rahat Fateh Ali Khan & Swati Sharma	4:09
3.	"Pakeeza"	Ahmed Siddiqui	Liyakat Ajmeri	K.K, Swati Sharma & Ali Aslam	5:33
4.	"Saiyyan"	A. M. Turaz	Ali (Piku)	Aman Trikha & Swati Sharma	4:52
5.	"Queen"	Husna Khan	Liyakat Ajmeri & Nawab Khan	Shahid Mallya, Bhoomi Trivedi	3:27
6.	"Humsafar"	Devendra Kafir	Sunil Singh	Swati Sharma	5:15
7.	"Saiyyan (Reprise)"	A. M. Turaz	Ali (Piku)	Sonu Nigam & Swati Sharma	5:00

== Crew ==
- Director – Arshad Siddiqui
- Cinematographer – Ravi Bhatt
- Associated Director – Tanveer Alam
