= My Father Godfather =

- Directed by: Pankaj Dheer
- Written by: Ankur Pajni
- Produced by: Essel Vision Productions
- Starring: Kratika Sengar; Sharad Malhotra; Aditya Pancholi; Shagufta Ali; Vijay Kashyap; Arun Bali
- Release date: April 2014
- Country: India
- Language: Hindi

My Father Godfather is a 2014 Indian romantic comedy-drama film directed by Pankaj Dheer and written by Ankur Pajni and produced by Essel Vision Productions. It was released in April 2014. The film has an ensemble cast starring Kratika Sengar and Sharad Malhotra. The film was intentionally supposed to be released theatrically but instead was released on Video on demand.

== Plot ==
Jahnavi (Kratika Sengar) and Prakash (Sharad Malhotra) are couple and are struggling in the television industry to make a mark. Jahnavi wants to be a famous actress while Prakash wants to be a writer. How difficult circumstances force Jahnavi to take a stance which makes her entire world turns unexpectedly to form the crux of the story.

== Cast ==
- Kratika Sengar as Jahnavi
- Sharad Malhotra as Prakash
- Aditya Pancholi as Don Suraj Singh
- Shagufta Ali as Mamiji
- Vijay Kashyap as Mamaji
- Arun Bali as Maalik
- Abhishek Duhan as Tittoo
- Ishaan Chhibber as Rimmey
- Utkarsha Naik as Constable Sheetal
- Vishal Thakkar as Roshan
- Aradhana Uppal as Boutique Owner
- Nishikant Dixit as Casting Coordinator
- Shamiksha Bhatnagar as Sabrina
- Johnny Lever (Special appearance)
