= Kratika Sengar =

Indian actress (born 1985)

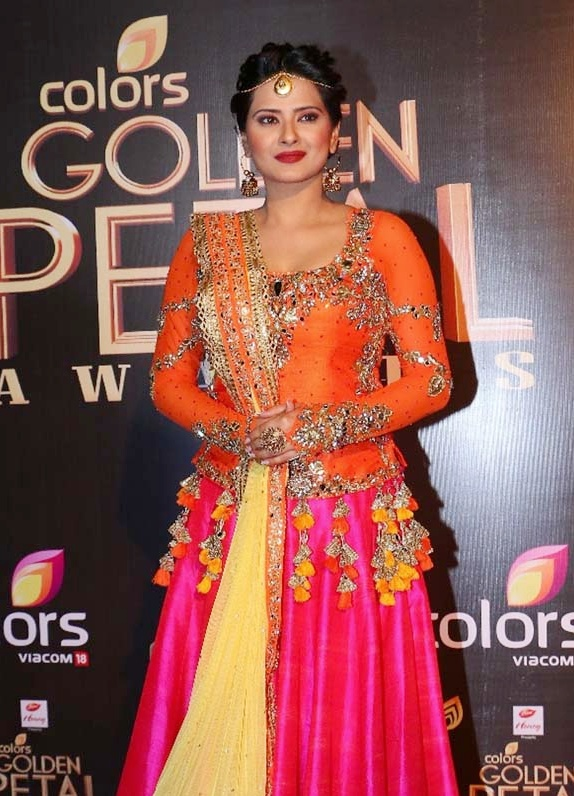
- Kratika in 2016
- Born: 3 July 1986 (age 40); Kanpur, Uttar Pradesh, India
- Other name: Kratika Sengar Dheer
- Occupation: Actress
- Years active: 2007–present
- Spouse: Nikitin Dheer (m. 2014)
- Children: 1
- Relatives: Pankaj Dheer (father-in-law)

Kratika Sengar Dheer (born 3 July 1986) is an Indian actress who primarily works in Hindi television. Sengar is widely recognised for her portrayal of Rani Lakshmibai in Ek Veer Stree Ki Kahaani – Jhansi Ki Rani and Tanushree Khurana Bedi / Tanuja Sikand Bedi / Kritika Kohli in Kasam Tere Pyaar Ki. She is a recipient of a Gold Award.

Sengar made her acting debut with Kyunki Saas Bhi Kabhi Bahu Thi, where she portrayed Sanchi and Sugandhi Virani. Her first major role came with her portrayal of Prerana "P2" Gill Garewal in Kasautii Zindagii Kay. Sengar earned further success while portraying Aarti Sindhia in Punar Vivaah – Zindagi Milegi Dobara and Payal Prasad in Service Wali Bahu. The biggest break of Sengar came with Kasam Tere Pyaar Ki in 2016.

Sengar is married to actor Nikitin Dheer with whom she has a daughter.

== Early life ==
Kratika Sengar was born on 3 July 1985 in Kanpur, Uttar Pradesh. She went to Methodist High School, Kanpur, and then moved to Delhi and graduated in Mass Communication from Amity University, Noida.

== Personal life ==
Kratika Sengar married Nikitin Dheer, son of actor Pankaj Dheer, on 3 September 2014 in an arranged marriage. In November 2021, Sengar announced her pregnancy. The couple welcomed their first child, a girl Devika Dheer on 12 May 2022.

== Career ==
=== Debut and early career (2007–2011) ===
Kratika Sengar started her acting career in 2007, in the series Kyunki Saas Bhi Kabhi Bahu Thi, and in Kasautii Zindagii Kay in 2008. She then bagged another Balaji Telefilms show Kya Dill Mein Hai in 2008. Later, she had a small guest appearance in Sony TV's comedy show Bura Na Mano Holi Hai. She also appeared in the reality show Lux Kaun Jeetega Bollywood ka Ticket.

In 2009, Sengar got her first main lead role with Zee TV's show Jhansi Ki Rani. She did a small cameo appearance in Balaji's show Kis Desh Mein Hai Meraa Dil. In 2010 she also appeared in an episodic appearance in Aahat.

=== Success and lead roles (2012–2015) ===
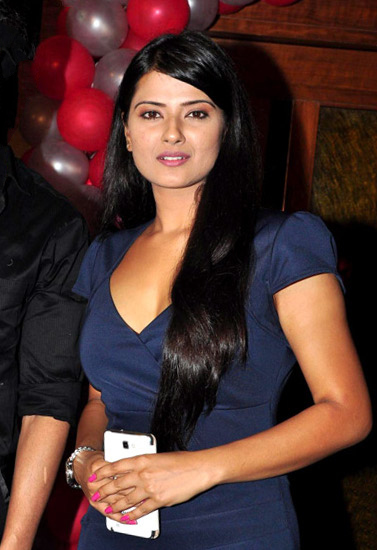
Sengar at Punar Vivah success party

In 2012, Kratika made her comeback to television with Zee TV's show Punar Vivah opposite Gurmeet Choudhary. The show ended on 17 May 2013. While playing Aarti, she made an appearance on Qubool Hai to promote her show. In January 2014, she made a special appearance in Star Plus' show Ek Veer Ki Ardaas...Veera. Later in the year, she entered Life OK's show Devon Ke Dev...Mahadev starring Mohit Raina and Mouni Roy as Manasa Devi before the show ended.

She made her film debut in 2014 with My Father Godfather. In 2015, Kratika acted in Zee TV's next Service Wali Bahu.

=== Establishment and further career (2016–present) ===
In 2016, Sengar played a lead role opposite Sharad Malhotra for a short period in Ekta Kapoor's show Kasam Tere Pyaar Ki. However, because of the fans' love for that character, she lasted longer than expected. Later, her character was killed off and reincarnated with a new face. But the fans' demand brought her back in September 2016 replacing Shivani Tomar. Later in the show, her character was again killed and reincarnated but this time the face remained same. The show went off air on 27 July 2018.

In 2017, she narrated in the show Chandrakanta. In 2021, she appeared in Choti Sarrdaarni.

== Filmography ==
=== Films ===
Year	Title	Role	Notes	Ref.
2011	Read My Silence	Arsala Fatima	Short film	
2014	My Father Godfather	Jhanvi Singh		

=== Television ===
Year	Title	Role	Notes	Ref.
2007	Kyunki Saas Bhi Kabhi Bahu Thi	Sanchi		
2008	Kyunki Saas Bhi Kabhi Bahu Thi	Sugandhi Virani (Note: Sengar played two or more characters in a single series.)		
2007–2008	Kasautii Zindagii Kay	Prerana "P2" Gill Garewal		
2008	Kya Dill Mein Hai	Naina Mann		
2008	Kaun Jeetega Bollywood Ka Ticket	Contestant		
2010–2011	Ek Veer Stree Ki Kahaani – Jhansi Ki Rani	Rani Lakshmibai		
2010	Aahat	Chitra Devasthal	Episode: "Bheemganj Part I & II"	
2012–2013	Punar Vivaah – Zindagi Milegi Dobara	Aarti Sindhia		
2014	Devon Ke Dev...Mahadev	Manasa		
2015	Service Wali Bahu	Payal Dev Prasad		
2016	Kasam Tere Pyaar Ki	Tanushree "Tanu" Khurana Bedi		
2016–2018	Kasam Tere Pyaar Ki	Tanuja Sikand Bedi		
2018	Kasam Tere Pyaar Ki	Kritika Kohli		
2021	Choti Sarrdaarni	Sandhya Shastri		

==== Special appearances ====
Year	Title	Role	Ref.
2008	Kahaani Ghar Ghar Kii	Prerana "P2" Gill Garewal	
2008	Bura Na Mano Holi Hai	Herself	
2008	Kis Desh Mein Hai Meraa Dil	Simran Dasgupta	
2011	Chotti Bahu – Sawar Ke Rang Rachi	Aarti Sindhia	
2012	Qubool Hai	Aarti Sindhia	
2014	Ek Veer Ki Ardaas...Veera	Herself	
2017	Chandrakanta	Narrator	

== Accolades ==
Year	Award	Category	Work	Result	Ref.
2013	Indian Telly Awards	Best Actress in a Lead Role	Punar Vivaah – Zindagi Milegi Dobara	Nominated	
2013	Indian Telly Awards	Best Onscreen Couple (with Gurmeet Choudhary)	Punar Vivaah – Zindagi Milegi Dobara	Nominated	
2013	Gold Awards	Best Actress in a Lead Role	Punar Vivaah – Zindagi Milegi Dobara	Nominated	
2016	Gold Awards	Best Actress in a Lead Role	Kasam Tere Pyaar Ki	Nominated	
2016	Gold Awards	Best Popular Jodi (with Sharad Malhotra)	Kasam Tere Pyaar Ki	Won	
2016	Indian Television Academy Awards	Best Actress - Popular	Kasam Tere Pyaar Ki	Nominated	
2016	Indian Television Academy Awards	Best Actress - Drama	Kasam Tere Pyaar Ki	Nominated	
2017	Gold Awards	Best Actress in a Lead Role	Kasam Tere Pyaar Ki	Nominated	
