= The Magic Of Shiri =

- Release poster
- Genre: Drama
- Written by: Sanchit Gupta; Priyadarshee Srivastava
- Directed by: Birsa Dasgupta
- Starring: Divyanka Tripathi; Jaaved Jaaferi; Namit Das; Darshan Jariwala; Nishank Verma; Parmeet Sethi
- Music by: Diptarka Bose
- Country of origin: India
- Original language: Hindi
- No. of episodes: 10

Production
- Producer: Jyoti Deshpande
- Cinematography: Shubhankar Bhar
- Camera setup: Multi-camera
- Running time: 26-33 minutes
- Production company: Jio Studios

Original release
- Network: JioCinema
- Release: 14 November 2024

The Magic Of Shiri is an Indian Hindi-language drama television series directed by Birsa Dasgupta and written by Sanchit Gupta and Priyadarshee Srivastava. Produced by Jyoti Deshpande and Tanveer Bookwala under Jio Studios, it stars Divyanka Tripathi, Jaaved Jaaferi, Namit Das, Darshan Jariwala, Nishank Verma and Parmeet Sethi. The series was premiered on JioCinema on 14 November 2024.

== Cast ==
- Divyanka Tripathi Dahiya as Shiri Shroff/ Shiri Dutt
- Jaaved Jaaferi as Jadugar Salim
- Namit Das as Naveen Shroff
- Darshan Jariwala as Jigar Shroff
- Parmeet Sethi as Ranveer Dutt/RD
- Neelu Kohli as Harleen
- Nishank Verma as Aakash Khanna
- Anngad Raaj as Sonu
- Pitobash as Bilal/Viktor

== Production ==
The series was announced on Jio Studios. The teaser of the series was released on 3 July 2023. Subsequently, the official trailer was released on 6 July 2023.

== Release ==
The series was initially scheduled to release on 13 July 2023, but was delayed and released on 15 November 2024 on Jio cinema

== Reception ==
Arpita Sarkar of OTTPlay rated the series 3/5 stars.
