= Kasam Tere Pyaar Ki =

Television series

- Genre: Fiction; Drama; Romance
- Written by: Anil Nagpal; Muhammad Haris Siddiqui
- Directed by: Mujammil Desai; Ranjan Kumar Singh; Anil V Kumar; Dharam Tarangi; Sharad Pandey; Sahil Sharma
- Starring: Sharad Malhotra; Kratika Sengar
- Opening theme: Pamela Jain
- Country of origin: India
- Original language: Hindi
- No. of seasons: 1
- No. of episodes: 623

Production
- Producers: Ekta Kapoor; Shobha Kapoor
- Camera setup: Multi-camera
- Running time: 21-25minutes
- Production company: Balaji Telefilms

Original release
- Network: Colors TV
- Release: 7 March 2016 – 27 July 2018

Kasam Tere Pyaar Ki (transl. Swear by Your Love) is an Indian Hindi-language television romantic drama series. That premiered on 7 March 2016 on Colors TV and went off air on 27 July 2018. It traces the journey of two lovers, Rishi and Tanu, reuniting after their rebirths. Produced by Balaji Telefilms, it stars Kratika Sengar and Sharad Malhotra. It is also digitally available on Voot.

== Plot ==
Tanu and Rishi are childhood friends just like their fathers, Veerendra and Raj in Patiala. They wanted to get Rishi and Tanu married. Katyani Bai prophecies they will be together for the next seven births. Rano who dislikes Tanu, tricks Raj into going to America. Tanu and Rishi part ways but vow to reunite when they grow up.

=== 17 years later ===
Tanu desperately waits for Rishi since 17 years, who returns to India. Rishi is a boxer and ladies' man, who forgot about Tanu. Veerendra and Sharda die in a terrorist attack. Bani sends Tanu and Ahana to Mumbai and misleads Bedis that Neha is Tanu and introduces Tanu as Tanvi. Rishi gets engaged to Neha but falls in love with Tanvi (actual Tanu) who is set to be wed to Pawan. Neha has a boyfriend Sandeep "Sandy" Sikand. Pawan first seemed to be a nice man but Rishi is suspicious of him. Pawan is revealed to be already married to Saloni who pretends to be his sister-in-law. Soon Rishi learns about Pawan's lie and runs away with Tanvi. Tanvi reveals that she is Tanu and marries Rishi. Bani's lies are revealed to the bedis, so do the lies of Pawan. Pawan is jailed and Raj curses Neha to be unhappy throughout her life. Neha, who wants revenge against the Bedis, lies to Sandy that Rishi molested her and ran away with her cousin, so Sandy tries to kill Rishi. He shoots Rishi but Tanu takes the bullets and dies in Rishi's arms. Rishi is shattered by Tanu's death. Rishi imagines talking to Tanu's soul that Tanu will return and waits for her. Tanu is reborn as Tanuja, Vikram's daughter, the friend Sandy considered as his own brother. Rishi drives his car fast and falls down from a cliff.

=== 20 years later ===
Tanuja, who lost her parents in a car accident, lives with Sandy's family in Amritsar. Sandy is still in guilt for killing Tanu. Neha and Sandy are married and have two daughters named Nidhi and Vidhi. On the other hand Rishi has lost his faith in love, hates women and is a tough person and Businessman. Ahana and Manpreet are married and they've two children named Smiley and Chintu. Yuvraj and Divya has a son Nakul. The Bedi family hates Bani and her family members. But Bani has not loose her greed for the Bedis' fortune yet. Neha and Bani trick to send Nidhi, Vidhi and Tanuja to the Bedi house. When Tanuja comes to Mumbai and she feels connected with the city. Tanuja's past life starts to haunt her, also in her dreams. Tanuja, Nidhi and Vidhi are sheltered at Bedi House, as per Bani's trick. Tanuja tries to find a job and she gets one in Rishi's company as his secretary. Rishi starts to hate her, not knowing that she is his secretary. Nidhi and Vidhi are on a mission to attract Nakul for the family's fortune. Tanuja feels a special connection with Bedi house and the family members. On the day of Ganesh Chaturthi, a fire breaks out at Bedi house, Rishi gets hurt and Tanuja's face gets burnt badly while saving him.

=== 3 months later ===
Tanuja gets Tanu's face through plastic surgery, whose photo was mistakenly given by Biji to the doctor, leaving Bedis shocked. Rishi believes that it was a part of Bani and Tanuja's plan. Tanuja realises her feelings for Rishi but he hates her believing her a gold digger. Rishi decides to marry Malaika to avoid Tanuja, but Raj learns about her affair as he sees Malaika entering a hotel room with a man. Raj reveals the truth to everyone but no one believes him. Everyone believes that he was hallucinating because of his Alzheimer's disease. Malaika pretends to be a well wisher of Rishi only to get revenge on him for destroying her boyfriend Shekhar's business. Raj tricks Tanuja to marry Rishi in order to save him from Malaika. Rano and Malaika tries to create distance and misunderstandings between them. They find a medical report saying Tanuja is pregnant and tags her characterless. Rishi makes Tanuja sign divorce papers. Just the moment everyone was about to throw her out of the house, it is revealed that it was actually Smiley who was pregnant with her boyfriend Rohit's child, and in order to save Bedi family's reputation, Tanuja pretended to be pregnant. Rishi eventually realises his love for Tanuja and they consummate their marriage. Rishi exposes Malaika and threw her out of the house. Next day, Tanuja falls down the stairs and faints. Taking advantage of the situation, Bani misleads the police that Bedis tortured their daughter-in-law Tanuja for dowry and gets them behind the bars. Again Rishi misunderstands Tanuja thinking that she did this on purpose to get revenge on Rano and throws her out of the house. Tanuja, then, meets with an accident and remembers her past life as Tanu. Seeing Tanuja in so much pain, Katyani Bai lies to Tanuja that she is a bad luck for Rishi, so Tanuja asked for divorce saying that Rano doesn't want her in the family or the house. Just after that, Raj's illegitimate son Purab Bohra shows up to destroy Rishi. He demands 51% percent shares in Bedi property as compensation from Raj. Raj, in order to save his family from him, gets the Bedi property on Tanuja's name by forging Rishi's signature behind the family's back. Now Tanuja runs the Bedi house and acts like a money sucker in front of the whole family including Rishi. Rishi tries to get the property papers signed from Tanuja to get it back but fails every time, and also gets close to Tanuja in the process. Rishi agrees to get engaged to Netra to make Tanuja jealous and also for Rano's sake. Rishi continues to flirt with Netra in order to make Tanuja jealous. Divya has joined hands with Purab and conspires against Rishi and Tanuja. Rishi overhears an argument between Tanuja and Rano and misunderstands that Tanuja is a gold digger. Tanuja finds out that Katyani Bai lied to her and confesses her love to Rishi, but he does not believe Tanuja. Tanuja vows to convince Rishi but is shocked after seeing Rishi and Netra together in bed (which was actually Netra's plan to create misunderstandings). Tanuja leaves the Bedi house and Rishi tries to stop her but during the argument, due to the allegations Tanuja made against him, Rishi gets angry and slaps her. She breaks all ties with him and boards the train. Tanuja finds out that she is pregnant with Rishi's child and tries to stop the train and inform Rishi but remembers the deception Rishi and Netra gave her together and decides to raise the child on her own.

=== 7 years later ===
Rishi is already a successful business tycoon. Yuvraj, Divya and Nakul have settled in the US Smiley is married to a nice guy. Rishi adopted Smiley's daughter, Tanya. Netra acts as Tanya's mother in the society. Rishi has a business rival named Abhishek Khurana with whom Tanuja is raising Rishi's and her daughter named Natasha in London. To Natasha, Abhishek is her father. Abhishek reaches India with Natasha and Tanuja to make business deals with Rishi. Rishi and Abhishek become business partners. Rishi meets Natasha as Abhishek's daughter, unaware that she is his child, as she is enrolled in the same school as Tanya. When Rishi comes across Tanuja, he is disheartened believing that she is Abhishek's wife and that they have a daughter together. Still Rishi tries to convince Tanuja to leave Abhishek and come live with him along with Natasha. But Tanuja refused to return because the situation convinced her that Rishi has a complete family and she doesn't want to be a homewrecker. So she keeps on trying to make Rishi believe that she has a happy family and doesn't plan to leave all of that for him.

One day, after school, Natasha meets an accident and lacks blood. As Rishi and Natasha share the blood group, he donates blood to Natasha. Emotionally driven Tanuja tries to tell Rishi the truth but fails. Rishi stops pursuing Tanuja after seeing the bond between Abhishek and Natasha. But after finding the reports of Natasha, Rishi's doctor friend gets suspicious and tests their DNA samples. Then informs Rishi that he is Natasha's real father. Rishi confronts Tanuja who refuses to return. Abhishek, who is secretly in love with her, discovers her past with Rishi. Rano files a case for Natasha's custody. Meanwhile Tanuja and Abhishek fight against the Bedis for Natasha's custody, it's revealed in front of everyone that Tanuja is not married to Abhishek. As it can weaken her case against Bedis, she decides to marry Abhishek. But Rishi prevents the wedding by proving that they are not divorced yet. Natasha learns that Rishi is her father. Natasha tells the court that she wants to live with Rishi and Tanuja. Tanuja moves in to Bedi house with Natasha after the court hearing, while she also tries to accept Netra. Netra gets insecure of Tanuja. Upon clearing all the misunderstandings created by Netra, Tanuja reconciles with Rishi. Heartbroken, Netra arranges a trap to kill them. Abhishek finds out but is late to inform Tanuja. Tanuja dies and in grief, Rishi also commits suicide. Netra gets jailed for her crimes.

=== 25 years later ===
Rishi's soul is reincarnated as Ranbir Kapoor, a football player born and raised in Canada. Ranbir, who is Rishi’s biological son too, was conceived through the preserved sperm shortly after Rishi's death. Tanuja is reincarnated as Kritika Kohli, a women raised in Ludhiana who later becomes a lawyer. Neither Ranbir nor Kritika remembers the love they once shared, and they lead different lives.

Fate, however, has other plans. Ranbir travels to India for a football event, and his path crosses with Kritika’s in Mumbai, in ways that neither can ignore. At first, their meetings are marked by misunderstandings and sharp words. Ranbir sees her as stubborn and arrogant; Kritika finds him self-obsessed. Yet beneath the surface, there is a strange familiarity — a pull neither of them can explain.

Circumstances bring them together when Ranbir is falsely accused in a scandal that threatens his career. Kritika, working as a lawyer, initially stands against him, but as the truth unfolds, she realizes his innocence and fights to clear his name. Through these trials, their animosity gives way to trust, and trust slowly blossoms into love. Ranbir begins to openly pursue her, while Kritika, though hesitant, finds herself drawn to him in ways that defy logic.

As their bond deepens, hints of their past-life connection appear in moments of unspoken understanding, shared glances, and an unshakable sense that they have known each other forever. Their souls recognize what their minds cannot.

In the final moments, Ranbir and Kritika recover their past-life memories, recognise each other, confess their love and unite, fulfilling the vows they made as Rishi and Tanu. The series closes on the idea that true love is timeless, surviving death and rebirth to find its way back again.

== Cast ==
=== Main ===
- Kratika Sengar as
  - Tanushree "Tanu" Khurana Bedi: Veerendra and Sharda's elder daughter; Ahana's elder sister; Rishi's first wife; Natasha's step-mother; Smiley and Chintu's aunt; Nakul's adoptive aunt; She reincarnates as Tanuja Sikand. (2016)
    - Kreesha Shah as Child Tanu. (2016)
  - Tanuja Sikand Bedi: Tanu's reincarnation; Vikram's daughter; Rishi's second wife; Natasha's mother; Tanya's adoptive mother; Smiley and Chintu's aunt; Nakul's adoptive aunt; She reincarnates as Kritika Kohli. (2016–2018)
    - Shivani Tomar as Tanuja (before plastic surgery). (2016)
  - Kritika Kohli: Tanuja's reincarnation; Arun and Malini's daughter; Ranbir's love interest. (2018)
    - Arshia Verma as child Kritika (2018)
- Sharad Malhotra as
  - Rishi Singh Bedi: Raj and Rano's elder son; Manpreet's elder brother; Yuvraj's adoptive brother; Tanu's widower; Tanuja's husband; Natasha's father; Tanya's adoptive father; Smiley and Chintu's uncle; Nakul's adoptive uncle. He reincarnates as Ranbir Kapoor. (2016–2018)
    - Hardik Khanna as Child Rishi. (2016)
  - Ranbir Kapoor: Rishi's reincarnation and biological son; Balraj and Mahima's son; Akki's cousin; Kritika's love interest. (2018)

=== Recurring ===
- Saba Mirza as Priti Singh Bedi "Biji": Raj's mother; Rishi, Manpreet and Purab's grandmother; Yuvraj's adoptive grandmother; Natasha, Smiley, and Chintu's great-grandmother; Nakul's adoptive great-grandmother; Tanya's great-great-grandmother. (2016–2018)
- Vijay Kashyap as Raj Singh Bedi: Rishi, Manpreet and Purab's father; Yuvraj's adoptive father; Rano's husband; Natasha, Smiley, and Chintu's grandfather; Nakul's adoptive grandfather; Tanya's great-grandfather. (2016–2018)
- Vibha Chibber as Rano Singh Bedi: Raj's wife; Rishi and Manpreet's mother; Purab's step-mother; Yuvraj's adoptive mother; Natasha, Smiley, and Chintu's grandmother; Nakul's adoptive grandmother; Tanya's great-grandmother. (2016–2018)
- Shivika Rishi as Natasha Singh Bedi: Rishi and Tanuja's daughter; Manpreet's niece; Yuvraj's adoptive niece; Tanu's step-daughter. (2017–2018)
- Aditi Sharma Ved as Ahana Khurana Bedi: Veerendra and Sharda's younger daughter; Tanu's younger sister; Manpreet's wife; Smiley and Chintu's mother; Natasha's aunt; Nakul's adoptive aunt; Tanya's grandmother. (2016–2018)
- Zuber K. Khan as Manpreet Singh Bedi: Raj and Rano's younger son; Rishi's younger brother; Yuvraj's adoptive brother; Ahana's husband; Smiley and Chintu's father; Natasha's uncle; Nakul's adoptive uncle; Tanya's grandfather. (2016–2018)
- Farhad Khan / Chandni Sandhu as Smiley Singh Bedi: Manpreet and Ahana's daughter; Rishi and Tanu's niece; Chintu's sister; Rohit's ex-lover; Tanya's mother. (2016–2017)
- Chahat Tewani as Tanya Singh Bedi: Smiley and Rohit's daughter; Rishi and Tanuja's grandniece and adopted daughter; Natasha's niece and adopted sister. (2017–2018)
- Devarsh Nirmal / Avtar Vaishnani as Chintu Singh Bedi: Manpreet and Ahana's son; Rishi and Tanu's nephew; Smiley's brother. (2016–2017)
- Lalit Bisht as Yuvraj Singh Bedi: Raj and Rano's adopted son; Rishi and Manpreet adopted brother; Divya's husband; Nakul's father. (2016–2017)
- Chetna Kaintura as Divya Singh Bedi: Yuvraj's wife; Nakul's mother. (2016–2017)
- Nikhil Khurana / Pranav Misshra / Pratyaksha Rajbhatt as Nakul Singh Bedi: Yuvraj and Divya's son. (2016–2017)
- Vishnu Sharma as Veerendra Khurana: Kuljeet's brother; Sharda's husband; Tanu and Ahana's father; Neha and Swati's uncle; Smiley and Chintu's grandfather; Tanya's great-grandfather. (2016)
- Jyoti Gauba as Sharda Khurana: Veerendra's wife; Tanu and Ahana's mother; Neha and Swati's aunt; Smiley and Chintu's grandmother; Tanya's great-grandmother. (2016)
- Gagan Gupta as Kuljeet Khurana: Veerendra's brother; Bani's husband; Neha and Swati's father; Tanu and Ahana's uncle; Vidhi and Nidhi's grandfather. (2016)
- Roma Bali as Bani Khurana: Kuljeet's wife; Neha and Swati's mother; Tanu and Ahana's aunt; Vidhi and Nidhi's grandmother. (2016–2017)
- Suman Jain as Swati Khurana: Kuljeet and Bani's younger daughter; Neha's younger sister; Tanu and Ahana's cousin; Nidhi and Vidhi's aunt. (2018)
- Sharhaan Singh as Sandeep "Sandy" Sikand: Vikram's brother-like friend; Neha's husband; Nidhi and Vidhi's father; Tanuja's uncle. (2016)
- Renee Dhyani as Neha Sikand: Kuljeet and Bani's elder daughter; Swati's elder sister; Tanu and Ahana's cousin; Rishi's ex-fiancée; Sandy's wife; Nidhi and Vidhi's mother; Tanuja's aunt. (2016–2017)
- Hema Sood as Nidhi Sikand: Sandy and Neha's elder daughter; Vidhi's elder sister; Tanuja's cousin. (2016)
- Shreya Gupta as Vidhi Sikand: Sandy and Neha's younger daughter; Nidhi's younger sister; Tanuja's cousin. (2016–2017)
- Bikramjeet Kanwarpal as Balraj Kapoor: Mahima's husband; Ranbir's father; Akki's uncle. (2018)
- Manjushree Kulkarni as Mahima Kapoor: Balraj's wife; Ranbir's mother; Akki's aunt. (2018)
- Abeer Singh Godhwani as Akshay "Akki" Kapoor: Balraj's nephew; Ranbir's cousin and best-friend; Jiyana's love interest. (2018)
- Rajesh Puri as Arun Kohli: Malini's widower; Pammi's husband; Kritika, Ishaani, and Jiyana's father. (2018)
- Jyothi Joshi as Malini Kohli: Arun's first wife; Kritika's mother; Ishaani and Jiyana's step-mother. (2018)
- Shivani Gosain as Parminder "Pammi" Kohli: Arun's second wife; Ishaani and Jiyana's mother; Kritika's step-mother. (2018)
- Vedika Bhandari as Ishaani Kohli: Arun and Pammi's elder daughter; Malini's step-daughter; Jiyana's elder sister; Kritika's step-sister. (2018)
- Sabina Jat as Jiyana Kohli: Arun and Pammi's younger daughter; Malini's step-daughter; Ishaani's younger sister; Kritika's step-sister. (2018)
- Manorama Bhattishyam as Katayani Bai: A Kali maa devote who prophesied that Rishi and Tanu soulmates. (2016–2017)
- Malhar Pandya as Pawan Malhotra: Savitri and Sukhpal's son; Saloni's husband; Tanu's ex-fiancé. (2016)
- Sehrish Ali as Saloni Malhotra: Pawan's wife. (2016)
- Parveen Kaur as Savitri Malhotra: Sukhpal's wife; Pawan's mother. (2016)
- Smriti Khanna as Malaika Malhotra: Rishi's ex-fiancée; Shekhar's girlfriend; Purab's ally. (2016–17)
- Amitabha A Gupta as Dr. Khanna (2016)
- Rohit Sharma as Shekhar Singh Ahlawat: Rishi's business rival; Malaika's boyfriend. (2016–17)
- Abhilash Kumar as Rohit: Smiley's ex-lover; Tanya's biological father (2016–17)
- Rohit Khurana as Dr. Manav Garewal. (2017)
- Puneet Sachdeva as Purab Bohra: Raj and Rita's illegitimate son; Rano's step-son; Rishi and Manpreet's half-brother. (2017)
- Pranitaa Pandit as Netra: Rano's friend Kanchan's daughter; Rishi's ex-fiancée; Tanya's caretaker; Tanuja's murderer (2017–2018)
- Amit Tandon as Abhishek "AK" Khurana: A rich NRI; Rishi's business rival, later business partner; Tanuja's friend; Natasha's foster father (2017–2018)
- Sonali Joshi as Abhishek's aunt; Myra's mother (2017–2018)
- Rini Das as Myra Khurana: Abhishek's cousin (2017–2018)
- Aansh Arora as Samar Singh Rajput: Abhishek's friend and manager in London. (2017)
- Mayank Kumar as Rohit: Abhishek's friend and manager. (2017–2018)
- Riya Raj Bhakuni as Riya: Abhishek's secretary (2017)
- Amit Behl as Ayush Batra: Kapoor mansion's caretaker; Malishka's father (2018)
- Shamin Mannan as Malishka Batra: Ayush's daughter (2018)
- Jiten Lalwani as Advocate Vikaas Sharma: Batras' lawyer; Kritika's boss (2018)
- Pooja Singh as Shilpa: Malishka's cousin (2018)

== Awards and nominations ==
Year	Award	Category	Recipient	Result	Ref.
2016	Gold Awards	Best Popular Jodi	Kratika Sengar & Sharad Malhotra	Won	
2016	Gold Awards	Best Actress in a Lead Role	Kratika Sengar	Nominated	
2016	Gold Awards	Best Actor in a Lead Role	Sharad Malhotra	Nominated	
2016	Indian Television Academy Awards	Gr8! Face (Male)	Sharad Malhotra	Won	
2016	Indian Television Academy Awards	Best Actor (Drama)	Sharad Malhotra	Nominated	
2016	Indian Television Academy Awards	Best Actress (Popular)	Kratika Sengar	Nominated	
2016	Indian Television Academy Awards	Best Actress (Drama)	Kratika Sengar	Nominated	
2016	FICCI Excellence Awards	Most Popular Television Fiction	Ekta Kapoor	Won	
2017	Gold Awards	Best Power Packed Performance	Sharad Malhotra	Won	
2017	Gold Awards	Best Actor in a Lead Role	Sharad Malhotra	Nominated	
2017	Gold Awards	Best Actress in a Lead Role	Kratika Sengar	Nominated	
2017	Gold Awards	Best Television Show (Fiction)	Ekta Kapoor	Nominated	
2018	Asian Viewers Television Awards	Male Actor of the Year	Sharad Malhotra	Nominated	
