= Service Wali Bahu =

- Genre: Drama
- Created by: Village Boy Productions
- Screenplay by: Siddhartha Vankar Saurabh; Dialogues; Amit Jha
- Story by: Raakesh Paswan; Vandana Tiwari
- Directed by: Rajesh Ram Singh; Sandeep Vijay; Vinod Laxmi Kumar
- Creative director: Neha Kothari
- Starring: Abhishek Rawat; Kratika Sengar
- Music by: Aashish Rego
- Country of origin: India
- Original language: Hindi
- No. of seasons: 1
- No. of episodes: 123

Production
- Producer: Raakesh Paswan
- Production location: Jharkhand
- Running time: 22 Minutes

Original release
- Network: Zee TV
- Release: 23 February – 17 July 2015

Service Wali Bahu (Translation: "Working Daughter-in-law"; international Title: Bride With Benefits) is an Indian television drama show, which premiered on 23 February 2015 and It airs on Zee TV. The show produced by Raakesh Paswan, under Village Boy Production. The show starring with Abhishek Rawat and Kratika Sengar in lead roles. The show also feature Akshara Singh, Vineet Kumar Chaudhary, Atul Srivastava, Pratichee Mishra, Ramakanth Daayama and Meena Mir in pivotal roles.

== Cast ==
- Kratika Sengar Dheer as Payal Dev Prasad
- Abhishek Rawat as Dev Jogeshwar Prasad
- Atul Srivastava as Jogeshwar Prasad(Natru), Dev's Father, Payal's Father-in-law
- Vineet Kumar Chaudhary as Ayodhya Prasad
- Akshara Singh as Gulkand Ayodhya Prasad
- Rammakanth Daayama as Bhuvneshwar Rai, Payal's Father
- Pratichee Mishra as Santoshi Prasad, Payal's Mother-in-law
- Meena Mir as Indu Rai
- Rocky Verma as Dubeyji (Secretary)

== Production and casting ==
The show is produced by Raakesh Paswan, under his own Village Boy Productions. The show feature actors Abhishek Rawat and Kratika Sengar in lead roles. Actor Abhishek Rawat is playing the role of Dev, a jobless person, And actress Kratika Sengar is playing the role of Payal, a civil engineer.

The show was promoted in Delhi on 20 February 2015.
