= Kabhie To Nazar Milao =

- Created by: Anuradha Gakhar
- Written by: Rajesh Beri; Reshma Khan Kidwai
- Directed by: Girish Vasaikar
- Starring: see below
- Theme music composer: Lalit Sen
- Opening theme: "Kabhie To Nazar Milao" by Alka Yagnik
- Country of origin: India
- Original language: Hindi
- No. of episodes: 100

Production
- Executive producer: Saeed Akhtar
- Producers: Ronnie Screwvala; Zarina Mehta; Deven Khote
- Editor: Mohammad Nazir
- Running time: 23 minutes per episode

Original release
- Network: Sony Entertainment Television
- Release: 15 May 2006

Kabhie To Nazar Milao is an Indian television drama series that premiered on Sony Entertainment Television on 15 May 2006. The series was produced by the UTV Software Communications, in association with in-house production of Sony Pictures.

== Plot ==
Karun does not realize that the girl with whom he falls in love is unable to see. As the story moves on, Karun finds out and he decides that he will be her eyesight. Now, Sunaina confronts all adversities of life with the help of Karun, but she does not realize that being too dependent on someone can be sorrowful.

== Cast ==
- Sudeepa Singh as Sunaina
- Gagan Arya as Karun
- Nishigandha Wad
- Mahru Shaikh
- Sharad Malhotra
- Kishori Shahane
- Lalit Parimoo
