= Sanskaar – Dharohar Apnon Ki =

Indian soap opera

- Genre: Soap opera
- Written by: Jayesh D. Patil; Harsha Jagdish; Rajesh Bura; Shirish Latkar; R M Joshi; Kirtida Gautam; Manish Paliwal
- Directed by: Anshoo Shyam
- Starring: See below
- Theme music composer: Shankar–Ehsaan–Loy
- Country of origin: India
- Original language: Hindi
- No. of seasons: 2
- No. of episodes: 331

Production
- Producers: Jitendra Thakare, Shalini Thakare, Ameya Khopkar
- Production locations: Godhra; Mumbai; New York City
- Cinematography: Sanjay Memane
- Camera setup: Multi-camera
- Running time: 22 minutes
- Production companies: Cimemantra Entertainment & Media P LTD

Original release
- Network: Colors TV
- Release: 14 January 2013 – 30 April 2014

Sanskaar – Dharohar Apnon Ki (transl. Values - our legacy) is a 2013 Indian soap opera that was broadcast on Colors TV. The first season of the show aired weeknights from 14 January 2013 to 12 September 2013. Season 2 began airing 7 October 2013 and the show ended on 30 April 2014.

This Serial was dubbed into Tamil as Gouravam and was telecasted on Raj TV. Both the seasons were telecasted continuously without a break between them.

== Series overview ==
Season	No. of episodes	Originally broadcast (India)	
Season	No. of episodes	Series premiere	Series finale
1	174	14 January 2013	12 September 2013
2	157	7 October 2013	30 April 2014

== Plot ==
Series is the story of Jai Kishan, the dedicated and cultured son of the Vaishnav family that lives in Keshavgarh. He wants to stay with his family, but situations force him to leave his home and go to the US. The show deals with his stay in a foreign land, and how he keeps his tradition close to his heart even when he's away from his homeland. Jai Kishan Vaishnav meets another Gujarati, Urmila Patel at a Lord Krishna temple in the US. His struggles continue with the loss of his luggage. Looking for his missing luggage, Jai Kishan reaches the office where he has to join. A policeman informs the Vaishnavs that the burning of their mill was not an accident. Meanwhile, Jai Kishan struggles to join his job without the documents. His boss cancels his work permit and he doesn't have any option except marrying an American citizen. He later marries Bhoomi and Bhoomi passes all the tests conducted by Ansu Baa and is finally accepted by the family

In season 2, Bhoomi gets pregnant and meets with an accident and dies along with the child. Jai gets engaged to childhood friend Deepika but marries Dhara for his protection. Although they are in a contract marriage, Dhara becomes pregnant with Jai's child but keeps it a secret while Deepika tells Jai she's pregnant with his child too. Both pregnancies come to light in front of the rest of the family. Dhara lies about the identity of the father of her child and Jai is forced to marry Deepika as soon as the contract ends. Deepika pretends that she is pregnant with Jai’s child. On the wedding day, it is revealed that she is not pregnant and Jai decides to stay with Dhara who finally admits that the baby she's carrying is his. Deepika shoots Dhara in a fit of jealousy but Dhara and her child are both fine.

== Cast ==
- Jay Soni as Jai Kishan Vaishnav
- Tejasswi Prakash as Dhara Vaishnav
- Shamin Mannan as Bhoomi Vaishnav
- Farhad Shahnawaz as Rammy
- Swapna Waghmare Joshi as Urmila Patel "Ummi"
- Sujata Sanghamitra as Gayatri
- Aruna Irani as Anusuya Vaishnav "Ansu Baa"
- Rasik Dave as Karsandas Vaishnav
- Sonali Sachdev as Parul Karsandas Vaishnav
- Rajendra Chawla as Hasmukhlal Vaishnav
- Chhaya Vora as Ramila Vaishnav
- Kartik Soni as Dilip Vaishnav
- Ketkie Jain as Avni
- Shresth Kumar as Gaurav
- Spandan Chaturvedi as Aarvi Vaishnav
- Devyansh Tapuriah as Nanku
- Pooja Kanwal Mahtani as Deepika
- Yashashri Masurkar / Supriya Kumari as Bharati
- Daisy Irani as Rukmini "Motiben"
- Krunal Pandit as Mayank
- Avinash Mukherjee as Ankit Vaishnav
- Arbaaz Ali Khan as Amritlal
- Ram Kapoor as Parmeshwar Patel Kapoor "Paddy"
- Supriya Shukla as Rameela Vaishnav
- Ahmad Harhash as Raj Pratap Rathore
- Hemant Thatte as Shaukat

== Other versions ==
This serial is also broadcast as Dil Ki Pukar on the Rishtey network.
