= Vivek Dahiya (actor) =

Indian actor

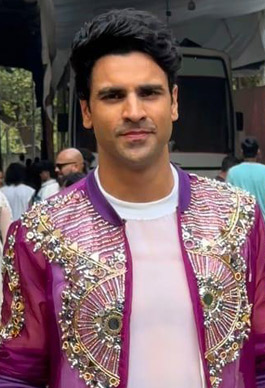
- Dahiya in 2023
- Born: 8 November 1984 (age 41); Chandigarh, India
- Occupation: Actor
- Years active: 2013–present
- Known for: Yeh Hai Mohabbatein, Qayamat Ki Raat
- Spouse: Divyanka Tripathi (m. 2016)
- Children: 2

Vivek Dahiya (born 8 November 1984) is an Indian movie, webseries and television actor. He has been seen in shows like Yeh Hai Mohabbatein and Qayamat Ki Raat. Dahiya also appeared in the web-series State of Siege: 26/11. He emerged as winner of the reality series Nach Baliye 8 in 2017.

== Early life ==
Dahiya was born on 8 November 1984 in Chandigarh in a Hindu Jat family. He pursued his master's degree M.Sc. in International Business Management from De Montfort University, England.

== Personal life ==
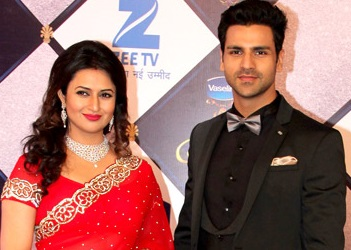
Dahiya with his wife Divyanka Tripathi, 2016

On 8 July 2016, Dahiya married his Yeh Hai Mohabbatein co-actress Divyanka Tripathi. The couple had twin sons on 26 May 2026.

== Filmography ==
=== Television ===
Year	Serial	Role	Notes.
2013	Yeh Hai Aashiqui	Devesh	
2014–2015	Ek Veer Ki Ardaas...Veera	ACP Rajveer Thakur	
2015–2017	Ye Hai Mohabbatein	Inspector Abhishek Singh	
2016	Kavach	Rajveer Bundela	
2017	Nach Baliye 8	Contestant	Winner
2018–2019	Qayamat Ki Raat	Rajvardhan Singh Suryavanshi / Raghav Sharma	
2023	Jhalak Dikhhla Jaa	Contestant	
2026–present	Dhammal with Pati Patni Aur Panga – Jodiyon Ka Reality Check	Contestant	Season 2

=== Web series ===
Year	Title	Role
2020	State of Siege: 26/11	Captain Rohit Bagga
2022	Pavitra Rishta 2	Rajveer

=== Films ===
Year	Title	Role	Ref
2021	State of Siege: Temple Attack	Captain Rohit Bagga	
2022	Jeena Abhi Baaki Hai	Cameo	
2023	Chal Zindagi		

=== Music videos ===
Year	Title	Singer
2021	"Aashiq Tera"	Amit Mishra
2022	"Main Kamina"	Rock D, Akansha Tripathi
2026	Ishtam	Kavya Kriti, Yashraj Kapil, Salamat Khan

== Awards ==
Year	Award	Category	Show	Result	Ref.
2018	Gold Awards	Most Fit Actor (Male)	—N/a	Won	
