= Ramashankar Yadav =

Indian poet and activist (1957 – 2015)

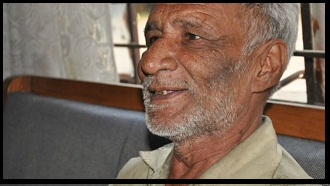
- Born: 3 December 1957; Sultanpur, Uttar Pradesh, India
- Died: 8 December 2015 (aged 58); New Delhi, India
- Education: Jawaharlal Nehru University
- Occupations: Poet, Social Activist
- Writing career
- Pen name: Vidrohi

Ramashankar Yadav (3 December 1957 – 8 December 2015), also known as Vidrohi, was an Indian poet and social activist. He attended Jawaharlal Nehru University (JNU) as a student, but continued to live on or around its campus well beyond his student life.

Always present during student protests, reciting his revolutionary poetry at such occasions, and otherwise at Ganga Dhaba, was a common sight. He died participating in a student protest in Delhi. He was a progressive poet with reformative spirit. He tried to sensitise the society at large against religious superstition, gender discrimination and economic inequality in society through his poems. He was vocal against state repression, persecution of marginalised people and silencing of dissent. A documentary, Main tumhara Kavi Hoon, was published on his life and work on 20 September 2015.

== Biography ==
Vidrohi was born in Sultanpur, Uttar Pradesh, India, to Ramnarayan Yadav and Karma Devi. He was studying for his LLB in a college in U.P. where he was rusticated due to his involvement in student politics. He came to New Delhi and got enrolled as a PhD candidate in the Hindi department of the Jawaharlal Nehru University, where he was rusticated again for similar reasons, during the disciplinary actions in response to the student protests of the early 1980s.

He is known for his poetry and for the lifestyle he had chosen. He lived mostly devoid of material possession, his clothes, mostly bought by others, being the only exception. He lived at the trees of JNU, the corners of its hostels, the benches of its eateries and the office of its student union.

He did not seek money, fame or power. He just recited his poems, opting to not write them down. His remaining written work was written down by his admirers, and later published. Vidrohi's poetry addressed issues including social inequality, caste discrimination, religious superstition, gender justice, state violence, and economic exploitation.

Vidrohi died on 8 December 2015 in New Delhi while participating in protests related to the Occupy UGC movement. His death was widely mourned by students, academics, writers, and activists, particularly within the JNU community, where he had become an iconic figure.

== Legacy ==
Vidrohi is remembered as one of the most distinctive voice of contemporary Hindi protest poetry. His life and work have been the subject of documentaries, books, and academic discussions. The documentary "Mai Tumhara Kavi Hoon " helped preserve his performances and introduced his poetry to a wider audience. His influence continues through public recitations, literary events, and student movements that invoke his poems and political ideals.
