= Banoo Main Teri Dulhann =

Indian drama television series

- Created by: Shakuntalam Telefilms
- Directed by: Neelima Bajpayi; Ismail Umar Khan; Inder Das
- Starring: See below
- Opening theme: "Banoo Main Teri Dulhann" by Mahalaxmi Iyer
- Composer: Abhijeet Hegdepatil
- Country of origin: India
- No. of seasons: 2
- No. of episodes: 700

Production
- Producers: Shyamashis Bhattacharya; Neelima Bajpaie
- Running time: 22 minutes
- Production company: Shakuntalam Telefilms Ltd

Original release
- Network: ZEE TV
- Release: 14 August 2006 – 28 May 2009

Banoo Main Teri Dulhann (transl. I will become your Bride) is a Hindi drama television series that aired on Zee TV from 14 August 2006 to 28 May 2009. The series deals with the trials and tribulations of an uneducated small-town woman, Vidya, after she marries Sagar, a rich educated businessman who is mentally ill and childlike after a car accident.

== Plot ==
=== Season 1 ===
Vidya is a kind-hearted and simple girl from Benaras (Varanasi). Similar to Cinderella, she is made to do all the work in her household and is tortured by her uncle, aunt, and cousin. They also do not allow her to get an education, leaving her illiterate.

A businessman from Delhi, Rajendra Pratap Singh, sees and likes Vidya and decides that she will be his daughter-in-law. On the day of her marriage, Vidya discovers that her new husband is mentally unstable with the mind of a child, due to a terrible car accident six months ago. Because of negative outer interferences and misunderstandings, the two get off to a rocky start trying to adjust to each other.

Sindoora, Sagar's evil stepsister, wants the family property and had caused the deadly car accident to kill him but was unsuccessful. She harasses Vidya along with her younger sisters, Mahua and Chandra, and attempts to expel her from the house. Sindoora brings Sagar's ex-girlfriend, Surili, who claims to have Sagar's child. She's eventually exposed and tries to expose Sindoora too, but no one believes her. Sindoora's kind ex-husband Aniket and young son Bharat support Vidya. Despite Sindoora's efforts, Vidya endears herself to the family, including Sagar.

After learning that a doctor from Singapore can cure Sagar, the couple travels there. Sagar's operation is successful but he does not remember anything after his car accident; thus, he does not recall his marriage nor Vidya. Sindoora tries to take advantage of this and turns him against his wife but the couple eventually reconcile and remarry. Sindoora tries to kill Sagar again but Aniket protects him, becoming paralyzed in the process. Gayatri, Sagar's aunt, knows about Sindoora and helps Vidya, encouraging her to learn to read and write. Sindoora sends Aniket to jail by blaming him for Sagar's accident, then attempts to murder Gayatri. She does not die but becomes comatose.

Sagar realizes the truth about his stepsister and he and Vidya work to get evidence to incriminate her. This culminates in Sindoora chasing down and shooting the couple dead at a cliff. Sagar and Vidya die together, but not before they are able to hide their evidence, with Sagar declaring that the story is not over. Meanwhile, Bharat learns that his mother killed Sagar and Vidya and flees the house.

=== Season 2 ===
==== 21 years later ====
Sagar and Vidya are reborn as Amar and Divya on the night of their death, with their economical statuses swapped from their previous lives; Amar grows up poor while Divya grows up wealthy. Amar is actually born as the son of Mahua and her husband Rajeev. Rajeev overhears the priest's future prediction about Sindoora and switches Amar with a boy named Samrat to keep him safe. Divya grows up as a modern girl from London while Amar becomes a spunky tour guide, living in Benaras. Divya becomes engaged to Samrat and travels with him to Delhi, where the Singh family, especially Sindoora, becomes shell-shocked upon seeing her physical similarity to Vidya.

Amar and Divya meet in Benaras, where their previous incarnations had also met for the first time. Divya has strange flashbacks of her previous life but does not understand them. The couple falls in love and when Amar comes to Delhi, Rajeev learns that he is his son as does Sindoora. Amar and Divya get married and individually remember their past lives at different times. They also reunite with a now-adult Bharat, who discovers that they are Sagar and Vidya's reincarnations. The three work together to take down Sindoora once and for all, and the show ends with their victory.

== Cast ==
=== Main ===
- Divyanka Tripathi as
  - Vidya Sagar Pratap Singh: Kaushalya's daughter; Sagar's wife
  - Divya Amar Shukla: Amar's wife
- Sharad Malhotra as
  - Sagar Pratap Singh "Chhote Thakur": Vidya's husband; son of Thakur Raghav Pratap Singh and Uma Pratap Singh
  - Amar Rajeev Shukla: Rajeev and Mahua's biological son; Divya's husband
- Kamya Panjabi as Sindoora Pratap Singh: Sagar's evil half-sister, Raghav's eldest daughter, Bharat's mother, Aniket's ex-wife and Sagar and Vidya's murderer (episodes 7–557, 622–700)

=== Recurring ===
- Amrapali Gupta as Radha: Vidya's friend from Benares. (episodes 1–12)
- Suhita Thatte as Kaushalya: Vidya's mother (episodes 1–206)
- Renuka Bondre as Hema: Vidya's evil aunt, Shalu's mother and Cheenu's mother-in-law (episode 1–562).
- Snehal Sahai as Shalu: Hema's daughter, Vidya's cousin, Cheenu's wife and Kamna's mother (episodes 1–393, 453, 517 & 537)
- Manish Naggdev as Chinmay "Cheenu": Uma's naphew, Sagar's cousin, Shalu's husband and Kamna's father (episodes 1–393, 453 & 537)
- Rajendra Gupta as Raghav Pratap Singh: Sagar, Sindoora, Mahua and Chandramukhi's father (episodes 1–13)
- Surinder Kaur as Uma Pratap Singh: Raghav Pratap Singh's second wife; Sagar's mother; Sindoora, Mahua and Chandramukhi's step-mother "Choti Maa" (episodes 1–700)
- Puneet Vashisht as Harsh: a local goon from Benares, Chandramukhi's ex-husband (episodes 1–377)
- Himanshi Choudhry as Mahua Singh: Raghav's second daughter, Sagar's half-sister, Kartik's ex-wife, Rajeev's wife, and Amar's mother (episodes 7–494)
  - Ritu Vashisht replaced Choudhry (episodes 495–578)
- Addite Shirwaikar as Chandramukhi: Raghav youngest daughter, Sagar's half-sister (episodes 7–393)
  - Shweta Dadhich replaced Shirwaikar (episodes 396–673)
- Rajesh Balwani as Aniket: Sindoora's ex-husband and Bharat's father (episodes 28–419, 515–700)
- Faisal Raza Khan as Kartik: Mahua's ex-husband
- Shyam Sharma as young Bharat Singh: Aniket and Sindoora's son (episode 28–393)
  - Mohit Malik as adult Bharat Singh "Mr. BS" (episodes 515–700)
- Soni Singh as Surili: Sagar's ex-girlfriend
- Raj Lathia as Sameer: a mute boy who was forced to play Sagar and Surili's fake illegitimate son (episodes 100–343)
- Indraneil Sengupta as Tushar: Sagar's childhood friend (episodes 128–206)
- Jaya Bhattacharya as Gayatri: Sagar's aunt (episodes 266–354)
- Kamini Kaushal as Dadi Maa: Harsh's grandmother
- Harsh Vashisht as Rajeev Shukla: Mahua's second husband (episodes 278–514, 527, 529, 553, 571 & 575)
- Shamin Mannan as Aditi: Bharat's wife and Karan's ex-wife (episodes 516–700)
- Vishal Watwani as Samrat: the false son of Rajeev and Mahua; Viren and Divya's good friend; Divya's ex-fiancé (episodes 396–507)
- Amrin Chakkiwala as Kamna: daughter of Cheenu and Shalu (episodes 403–508)
- Neeta Shetty as Dr. Shivani
- Atul Srivastava as DJ: Sagar and Vidya's helper
- Abhileen Pandey as Chintu: Amar's younger cousin Samrat's biological brother
- Anokhi Shrivastav as Bindiya: Amar's childhood friend and former fiancée
- Aadesh Chaudhary as Viren: Divya and Samrat's old friend; Divya's fake husband (episodes 509–520)
- Sachin Shroff as Dr. Shashank (episodes 677–696)
- Anisha Kapur as Gauri: a village girl who thinks Amar is her fiancée Shivam (episodes 563–655)
- Omar Vani as Shivam: Gauri's fiancée on whom Amar accidentally runs over the car and kills (episodes 562, 563, 566 & 593)
- Sonali Verma as Karuna: Bharat's Chhoti Maa

=== Special guests ===
- From Saat Phere – Saloni Ka Safar:
  - Rajshree Thakur as Saloni Singh
  - Sharad Kelkar as Nahar Singh
- From Maayka:
  - Neha Bamb as Mahi Sareen
  - Vivan Bhatena as Shabd Sareen
- From Ghar Ki Lakshmi Betiyann:
  - Kshitee Jog as Saraswati Garodia
  - Romit Raj as Yuvraj Garodia
- From Rakhi – Atoot Rishtey Ki Dor
  - Ayub Khan as Bhai Raja
  - Monalika Bhonsle as Neelima Thakur
- Sayantani Ghosh as Amrita from Naaginn. (special appearance in episodes 581 and 582)

== Production ==
Producer Neelima Bajpai wanted to name the series as Dulhan but as the copyright was with Yash Raj Films with the same title of a film, Bajpai named the series as Banoo Main Teri Dulhann.

In November 2008, the shootings and telecast of this series and films were stalled on 8 November 2008 due to dispute by the technician workers of FWICE (Federation of Western India Cine Employees). During the strike, the channels blacked out new episodes broadcast and repeat telecasts were shown from 10 November 2008. On 19 November 2008, the strike was called off after settling the disputes, and the production resumed. The new episodes started to telecast from 1 December 2008.

The series was supposed to go off air on 22 May 2009 but got an extension for four episodes and it ended on 28 May 2009.

== Broadcasts ==
Country	Channel	Language
Afghanistan	Ariana TV	Dari
Indonesia	ANTV (Zee Bioskop	Indonesian)
France	Zee Magic	French
United Arab Emirates	Zee Aflam	Arabic
South Africa	Zee World	English
Vietnam	Đài Phát thanh - Truyền hình Cần Thơ	Vietnamese
Cambodia	SEATV	Khmer
Romania	National TV	Romanian
Myanmar	5 Plus	Burmese
