= Vijay Kashyap =

Indian actor

- Occupation: Actor
- Years active: 1982 – present

Vijay Kashyap is an Indian actor, known for his role in films like Gandhi and the famous Doordarshan TV series Tenali Rama.

== Filmography ==
=== Film ===
- Gandhi (1982) - Apte
- Ardh Satya (1983) - Union Leader
- Party (1984) - Guest
- Saaransh (1984) - Dr. Bhatt
- Mohan Joshi Hazir Ho! (1984) - Chawl Tenant 4
- Giddh (1984) - Katra
- Nasoor (1985)
- Aghaat (1985)
- Tan-Badan (1986)
- Bhagwaan Dada (1986) - Michael D'Costa
- New Delhi Times (1986) - Mehku miya
- Wasta (1989)
- Nocturne indien (1989) - La réceptionniste de l'hôtel Mandovi
- Drishti (1990) - Ramesh
- Diksha (1991) - Manjunath
- Karamati Coat (1993) - Magan
- Aaja Meri Jaan (1993)
- Little Buddha (1993) - Vizir
- Triyacharitra (1994)
- Barsaat (1995) - Kapurchand (College Principal)
- Tarpan The Absolution (1995) - Phatto
- English Babu Desi Mem (1996)
- Dillagi (1999)
- Hum To Mohabbat Karega (2000) - Havaldar Rokde
- Nayee Padosan (2003) - Shastri Iyengar
- Swami (2007) - Muthu - Swami's friend
- Milenge Milenge (2010) - Premsing
- F.A.L.T.U (2011) - Nair
- Arjun: The Warrior Prince (2012) - Shakuni (voice)
- Psycho (2013) - Meera's Father
- Divana-e-Ishq (2013)
- My Father Godfather (2014) - Landlord
- Take It Easy (2015)
- Jai Ho! Democracy (2015) - Khurram Razak Cheema

=== Television ===
Year	Title	Role	Notes	Ref.
1984	Yeh Jo Hai Zindagi	Tarun Bhattacharya		
1987	The Edge Malgudi Days			
1990	Tenali Rama	Tenali Rama		
2011–2013	Kuch Toh Log Kahenge	Colonel. Yograj "Trilok" Verma		
2016–2018	Kasam Tere Pyaar Ki	Raj Singh Bedi		
2017	Kundali Bhagya	Raghuveer Arora		
2017	Kumkum Bhagya	Raghuveer Arora	Cameo	
2019	Khoob Ladi Mardaani – Jhansi Ki Rani	Baji Rao II		
2019–2020	Yeh Hai Chahatein	Gopal "GPS" Srinivasan		
2020–2021	Ziddi Dil Maane Na	Col. Pushpinder Batra		
2020–2021	Hero – Gayab Mode On	Professor Bhatkal		
2025	Ram Bhavan	Ram Das Vajpayee		
