= Chintu Chinki Aur Ek Badi Si Love Story =

- Promotional poster
- Genre: Comedy
- Written by: Rajat Vyas; Nitin Keswani
- Directed by: Ashish Khurana; Divyesh Pathak
- Starring: See below
- Music by: Abhijeet Hegdepatil (KK)
- Country of origin: India
- Original language: Hindi
- No. of seasons: 1
- No. of episodes: 130

Production
- Producers: Jamandas Majethia; Aatish Kapadia
- Camera setup: 480i
- Running time: 24 minutes
- Production companies: Hats Off Productions; 3 Cheers Production

Original release
- Network: Sony SAB
- Release: 22 August 2011 – 17 February 2012

Chintu Chinki Aur Ek Badi Si Love Story (transl. Chintu Chinki and a longest story) is a SAB TV comedy TV show. It was produced by JD Majethia and Aatish Kapadia from Hats Off Productions and co-produced by Rajesh Kumar, Ashish Khurana and Rajat Vyas from 3 Cheers Production.

== Plot ==
Set in the present time Bhopal, the serial revolves around the love story of Mr Chintu and Miss Chinki. Chintu stays in a joint family and is a simple, innocent guy. He is famous in college and loved by his neighbours. Majority of decisions in the family are taken by elders and chintu knows the fact. It is time for Chintu to get married as per his family wishes rather his own will.

Chinki is from a small family. She is independent-minded person but very soft and kind at heart. She is very clear that she needs to marry a guy who measures up to her father in thoughts and values. She loves her grandmother who believes in romance. Partially supporting Chinki is their loyal servant with whom the grand mother always fights.

Chintu accidentally meets Chinki and falls in love with her. In subsequent episodes the love story progresses with hits, misses, confusions. The love letters, family opposition, hidden meetings, and funny excuses to go on a date form the core part of the story. Chintu's friend Kishan is the major supporter who gives the ideas and get based too. Yet things get resolved, Chintu and Chinki get married. After their marriage, the story revolves on how Chinki progresses from a nuclear family to a large joint family with Chintu. Thus the love story takes a journey of its own constrained by limitations of joint family beliefs and values.

== Cast ==
- Rajesh Kumar as Chintu
- Divyanka Tripathi Dahiya as Chinki
- Dolly Minhas as Saraswati
- Rakesh Bedi as Jagat mama
- Abhishek Avasthi as Kishan
- S. M. Zaheer as Swatantra Swabha Dwivedi
- Nishikant Dixit
- Saurabh Raj Jain as Aman
- Deepak Dutta as Chintu's Father
- Harsh Khurana as Chintu's Uncle
- Jhumma Mitra as Chintu's Aunt
- Gurvinder Gauri as Chintu's Mother.
