= Divyanka Tripathi =

Indian television actress (born 1984)

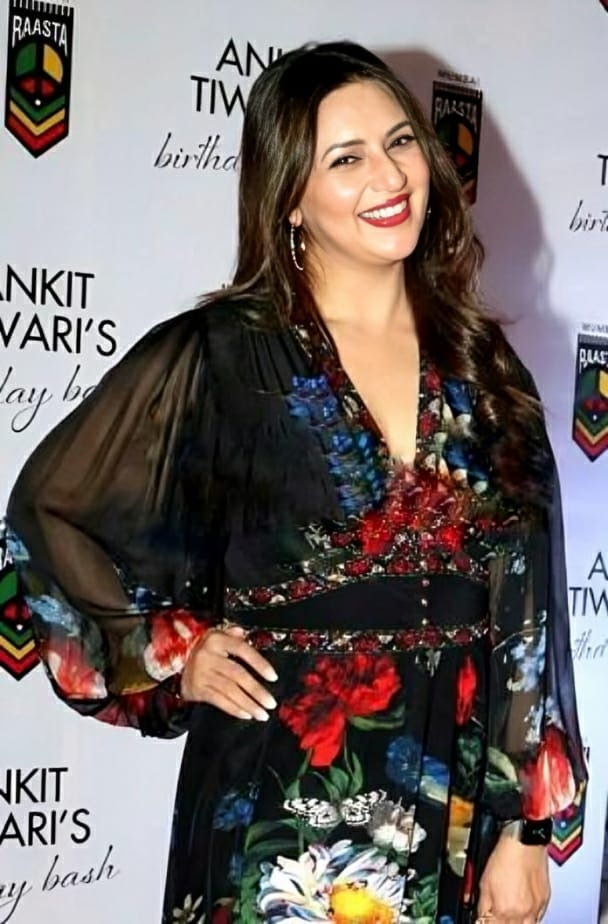
- Tripathi in 2025
- Born: 14 December 1984 (age 41); Bhopal, Madhya Pradesh, India
- Education: Nehru Institute of Mountaineering
- Known for: Yeh Hai Mohabbatein; Banoo Main Teri Dulhann; Nach Baliye 8; Fear Factor: Khatron Ke Khiladi 11
- Spouse: Vivek Dahiya (m. 2016)
- Children: 2
- Awards: Full list

Divyanka Tripathi Dahiya (née Tripathi; pronounced [d̪ɪˈʋjaŋka t̪ɾɪˈpaːʈʰi]; born 14 December 1984) is an Indian actress who primarily works in Hindi television. One of the highest-paid television actresses in India, She is a recipient of several accolades including three ITA Awards, nine Indian Telly Awards and seven Gold Awards. She has appeared in Forbes India's Celebrity 100 list since 2017.

She is known for playing the double roles of Vidya Pratapsingh and Divya Shukla in Zee TV's Banoo Main Teri Dulhann and Dr. Ishita Bhalla in Star Plus's Yeh Hai Mohabbatein, both of these show earned her ITA Award for Best Actress - Popular and Best Actress - Jury. In 2017, participated in the dance reality show Nach Baliye 8 and emerged as the winner. In 2021, she participated at Fear Factor: Khatron Ke Khiladi 11 as a contestant where she emerged as the runner-up.

== Early life and education ==
Tripathi was born on 14 December 1984 in Bhopal, Madhya Pradesh. She was educated at Carmel Convent School, Bhopal. She then graduated from the Sarojini Naidu Government Girls PG College in Bhopal. She completed a mountaineering course from Nehru Institute of Mountaineering in Uttarkashi.

== Career ==
Tripathi started her career as an anchor on All India Radio, Bhopal. She participated in Pantene Zee Teen Queen in 2003 and won the title of Miss Beautiful Skin. In 2004, Tripathi participated in India's Best Cinestars Ki Khoj and ended up being in top 8 from Bhopal zone. She again contested from the Indore zone where she was declared the runner up. This ensured her qualification for phase 2 of the contest where she lost eventually. In 2005, she was crowned Miss Bhopal.

Tripathi made her acting debut in a telefilm for Doordarshan and later presented a show called Akash Vani. In 2005, she acted in Star One's Yeh Dil Chahe More as Payal followed by Viraasat as Melanie in 2006. In August 2006, Tripathi was roped in for Zee TV's drama fiction Banoo Main Teri Dulhann by playing the dual roles of Vidya and Divya. She received recognition for the role of Vidya and her onscreen pair with Sharad Malhotra. She won many awards for her performance in the show including the Indian Television Academy Award for Best Actress in Drama Category and the Indian Telly Award for Fresh New Face. The show ran for three years and ended in 2009. She participated in Zee TV's Khana Khazana as a contestant in 2006.

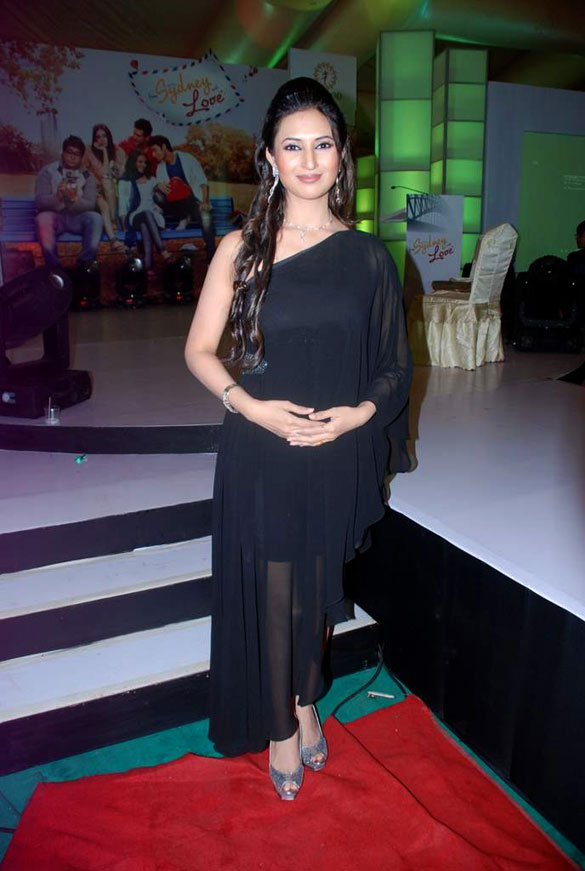
Tripathi in 2012

In 2007, Tripathi participated in Sahara One's reality show, Jjhoom India as a contestant. In 2008, she participated in Imagine TV's Nachle Ve with Saroj Khan. In the same year she presented 9X's Jalwa Four 2 Ka 1. In 2009, Tripathi featured in the second season of StarPlus's horror thriller Ssshhhh...Phir Koi Hai. In 2010, she played the role of Rashmi Sharma, a housewife in SAB TV's comedy drama Mrs. & Mr. Sharma Allahabadwale. In 2011 Tripathi participated in Imagine TV's Zor Ka Jhatka: Total Wipeout. She later played the lead in SAB TV's Chintu Chinki Aur Ek Badi Si Love Story as Suman, followed by appearing in an episodic appearance in Adaalat. In 2012, she acted in Star Plus's Teri Meri Love Stories as Nikita opposite Iqbal Khan.

In 2013, she portrayed the character of Dr. Ishita Bhalla, an infertile dentist who marries a chief executive officer, in order to provide maternal affection to his daughter in Ekta Kapoor's show Yeh Hai Mohabbatein opposite Karan Patel.

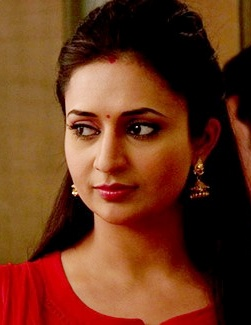
Tripathi on the sets of Yeh Hai Mohabbatein in 2015

The show premiered in December 2013 and ran successfully for six years until it ended at the end of 2019. Her portrayal of Ishita won her many awards and nominations such as the Indian Telly Award for Best Actress in a Lead Role, the Lions Gold Award for Best Actress in Lead Role, and the Boroplus Gold Award for Best Actress in a Lead Role. In 2015, she received a Shan-E-Bhopal Award. In 2016, she received two awards at the Gold Awards for Face of The Year and Best Actress in a Lead Role.

In 2016, Tripathi participated in Colors TV's sports reality show, Box Cricket League 2. Later in the same year, she made a cameo appearance in Life OK's Bahu Hamari Rajni Kant along with Anita Hassanandani, Hina Khan and Karanvir Bohra. In 2017, she participated in Nach Baliye 8 with her husband Vivek Dahiya and emerged as the winner while Mohit Sehgal, Sanaya Irani became finalists.

In 2018, Tripathi made an appearance on Kanpur Wale Khuranas. In early 2019, Tripathi presented Star Plus's singing reality show The Voice 3. In June 2019, Tripathi made a cameo appearance in Kahaan Hum Kahaan Tum starring Dipika Kakar. In 2020, she made an appearance on The Greedy Closet. In December 2020, Tripathi presented Sony TV's crime show, Crime Patrol until March 2021. In 2021, she participated in Colors TV's stunt based reality show, Fear Factor: Khatron Ke Khiladi 11 as a contestant. Since October 2026, she was a contestant in Colors TV's Dhammal with Pati Patni Aur Panga – Jodiyon Ka Reality Check with her husband.

== Personal life ==
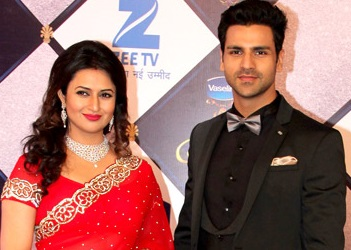
With her husband Vivek Dahiya, 2016

Tripathi dated actor Sharad Malhotra, her co-actor from Banoo Main Teri Dulhann for 8 years, but they broke up in 2015.

On 16 January 2016, she got engaged to her Ye Hai Mohabbatein co-actor Vivek Dahiya. They got married on 8 July 2016 in Bhopal. The couple had twin sons on 26 May 2026.

== Media image ==
In 2014, Tripathi was ranked 23 among the "35 Hottest Actresses In Indian Television" by MensXP.com, an Indian lifestyle website for men. In 2017, she became the first Indian television actress to appear in the Forbes Celebrity 100 list, a list based on the income and popularity of India's celebrities, ranking 96th. For the next two years, she was ranked 94th & 79th respectively. In 2017, for her performance as Ishita, The Indian Express placed her at second position in its "Top 10 television actresses" list. In 2018, Times ranked her 3rd in the Top 10 Popular Actress in Television.

In 2017, Tripathi posted some emotional tweets condemning the rape of a 12-year-old girl in Chandigarh on Independence Day (15 August), some of which she addressed to Prime Minister Narendra Modi, urging him to take strict action against the rapist.

In the same year, Tripathi was trolled for her character Haryanavi from the serial Yeh Hai Mohabbatein. She was called pathetic and disgusting for using dark brown makeup for this role. About this Tripathi replied to the troll by saying:

If I chose to be dark... How's it pathetic? Do you find it pathetic? You guys don't even think before bashing! Which Indian actor will voluntarily choose to look dark on screen? It's not usual!!!", "Know me first before judging! I'm doing that make up myself! Everyday! So please... Watch the track, understand and respect instead of writing baseless provocative comments!

In 2020, Tripathi won the title of "International Iconic Most Popular Face Of Indian Television 2020". Tripathi honored with Champions of Change in 2021.

== Filmography ==
=== Television ===
Year	Title	Role	Notes	Ref(s)
2006	India's Best Cinestars Ki Khoj	Contestant		
2006–2008	Banoo Main Teri Dulhann	Vidya Sagar Pratapsingh	Main role	
2008–2009	Banoo Main Teri Dulhann	Divya Amar Shukla	Main role	
2006	Khana Khazana	Contestant		
2008	Nachle Ve with Saroj Khan	Contestant		
2008	Jalwa Four 2 Ka 1	Presenter		
2009	Ssshhhh...Phir Koi Hai – Intezaar	Radhika		
2009	Ssshhhh...Phir Koi Hai – Intezaar	Meera		
2010	Mrs. & Mr. Sharma Allahabadwale	Rashmi Sharma	Main role	
2011	Zor Ka Jhatka: Total Wipeout	Contestant		
2011	Chintu Chinki Aur Ek Badi Si Love Story	Chinki	Main role	
2011	Adaalat	Kumud Sharma / Flavia Golmes		
2012	Teri Meri Love Stories	Nikita		
2012	Ramayan	Devi Apsara		
2013	Savdhaan India	Resham		
2013	Comedy Circus	Contestant		
2013–2019	Yeh Hai Mohabbatein	Dr. Ishita Bhalla	Main role	
2014–2015	Box Cricket League 1	Contestant		
2017	Nach Baliye 8	Contestant	Winner	
2019	The Voice 3	Host		
2021	Crime Patrol	Presenter		
2021	Fear Factor: Khatron Ke Khiladi 11	Contestant	1st runner-up	
2023	Fear Factor: Khatron Ke Khiladi 13	Challenger		
2026–present	Dhammal with Pati Patni Aur Panga – Jodiyon Ka Reality Check	Contestant		

==== Special appearances ====
Year	Title	Role	Ref.
2005	Viraasat	Melanie Kapoor	
2007	Kasamh Se	Vidya	
2007	Saat Phere: Saloni Ka Safar	Vidya	
2008	Chotti Bahu	Vidya	
2010	F.I.R.	Rashmi	
2011	Taarak Mehta Ka Ooltah Chashmah	Suman	
2013	Iss Pyaar Ko Kya Naam Doon?	Ishita	
2015	Tere Sheher Mein	Ishita	
2015	Nach Baliye 7	Ishita	
2015	Kuch Toh Hai Tere Mere Darmiyaan	Ishita	
2016	Diya Aur Baati Hum	Ishita	
2016	Bahu Hamari Rajni Kant	Ishita	
2018	Kundali Bhagya	Herself	
2018	Kanpur Wale Khuranas	Herself	
2019	Kahaan Hum Kahaan Tum	Herself	
2019	Nach Baliye 9	Herself	
2019	Yeh Hai Chahatein	Ishita	
2020	The Greedy Closest	Herself	
2022	Mika Di Vohti	Herself	
2023	Jhalak Dikhhla Jaa 11	Herself	

=== Films ===
Year	Title	Role	Ref.
2012	Lala Hardaul	Rani Padmavati	
2014	A Divorce to Remember	Zara	

=== Web series ===
Year	Title	Role	Ref.
2019	Coldd Lassi Aur Chicken Masala	Chef Nithya Sharma	
2023	Adrishyam – The Invisible Heroes	Parvati	
2024	The Magic Of Shiri	Shiri	

=== Music videos ===
Year	Title	Singer	Label	Ref.
2022	Babul Da Vehda	Asees Kaur	MB Music	

== See also ==
- List of Hindi television actresses
- List of Indian television actresses
