= Shamin Mannan =

Indian actress

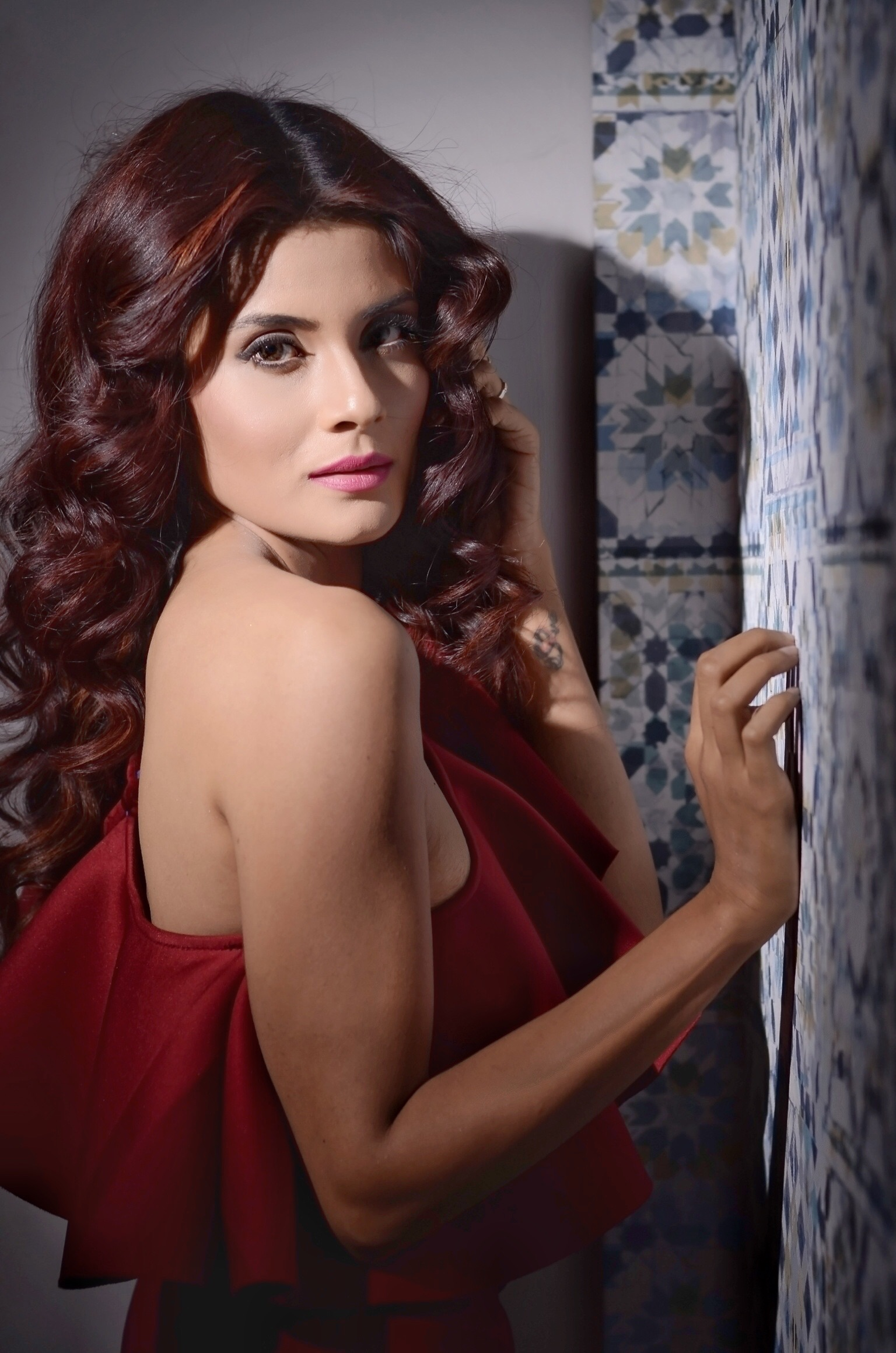
- Mannan in 2018
- Born: Dibrugarh, Assam, India
- Occupations: Actress; model
- Relatives: Tamanna Mannan (sister)

Shamin Mannan is an Indian actress who works in Hindi television. She is best known for playing Bhoomi Vaishnav in Colors TV drama series Sanskaar – Dharohar Apno Ki (2013–14).

== Early and personal life ==
Mannan was born in Dibrugarh, Assam. She has a younger sister, Tamanna, who is also a Hindi television actress, known for her work in Star Plus' Nazar.

Mannan is a Muslim and describes herself as "more spiritual than religious". In February 2016, she revealed that she has been in an eight-year long relationship with Atul Kumar. On 3 December 2017, she married Kumar in a private ceremony in Kaziranga.

== Career ==
Shamin appeared in many TV commercials - Dabur Gulabari Rose Water, Bagh bakri tea, Dish TV, Sony Ericson, Polycrol antacid & McDonalds. She was most appreciated for Colors TV's Sanskaar - Dharohar Apno Ki as Bhoomi.

== Web ==
Title	Channel	Notes
Anjaan : Rural Myths	Netflix	Lead
Khade Hain Teri Raahon Mein	Hotstar	Lead

== Television ==
Year	Title	Channel	Notes
2013-2014	Sanskaar - Dharohar Apno Ki	Colors TV	Lead
	Ram Pyaare Sirf Humare	Zee TV	Lead
2013-2016	Yeh Hai Aashiqui	Bindass	Lead
	Pyaar Tune Kya Kiya	Zing TV	Lead
	Khidki	Sab TV	Lead
	MTV Big F	MTV	Lead
2018	Kasam Tere Pyaar Ki	Colors	Antagonist
