= List of accolades received by Kasautii Zindagii Kay =

Kasautii Zindagii Kay awards and nominations
Award	Won	Nominated
Indian Television Academy Awards	26	49
Indian Telly Awards	37	38
Asian Television Awards	1	N.A.
Apsara Film & Television Producers Guild Awards	5	9
Star International Awards	5	6
Zee Gold Awards	2	5
Kalakar Awards	7	2
Sinsui Television Awards	13	6
The Global Indian Film and TV Honours	3	2
Golden Glory Awards	1	0
International Iconic Awards	1	0
- Tally
Totals	156	117

Kasautii Zindagii Kay (2001 TV series) was the Ekta Kapoor's second most awarded show after Kyunki Saas Bhi Kabhi Bahu Thi and one of the Longest ran serial of Indian Television. The show won both Technical and Personality awards in both categories i-e Jury and Popular. Urvashi Dholakia as Komolika Basu made a range winning most Indian Telly Awards for Best Actress in Negative role. Shweta Tiwari as Prerna Basu made a range winning most awards for Favourite Maa. Cezanne Khan & Ronit Roy also won numerous awards for their performances. The Cast of the show was also considered the GR8! Ensemblance Acting Cast in 2003. Kasauti was the 2nd Most Awarded and Entertaining Best Show of Star Plus and Indian Television, too. The show also won three International awards for International Favorite Serial in 2002, 2003, 2004.

== Indian Television Academy Awards ==
The Indian Television Academy Awards, also known as the (ITA Awards) is an annual event organised by the Indian Television Academy. The awards are presented in various categories, including popular programming (music, news, entertainment, sports, travel, lifestyle and fashion), best television channel in various categories, technical awards, and Best Performance awards.

Year	Category	Recipient	Character	Result		
2002	Best Music Composer	Lalit Sen	Crew	Won		
2002	Best Dialogues	Rekkha Modi	Crew	Won		
2002	Best Dress Designer	Manohar Sawant	Crew	Won		
2002	Best Actor in a Comic Role - Drama	Manish Goel	Anupam Sen Gupta	Won		
2002	Best Actor in a Comic Role - Drama	Sikandar Kharbanda	Indroneal Sen Gupta	Nominated		
2002	Best Actor in a Supporting Role - Drama	Manav Gohil	Praveen Sen Gupta	Nominated		
2002	Best Actress in a Supporting Role - Drama	Prachi Thakker	Rakkhee Sen Gupta	Nominated		
2002	Best Actress in a Supporting Role - Drama	Poonam Narula	Nivedita Basu	Nominated		
2002	Best Actor in a Negative Role - Drama	Ronit Roy	Rishab Bajaj	Nominated		
2002	Best Actress in a Supporting Role - Drama	Ruby Bhatia	Maneka Bose	Nominated		
2002	Best Actress in a Supporting Role - Drama	Urvashi Dholakia	Komolika Majumdar	Nominated		
2002	Best Star Cast	Ekta Kapoor	team	Nominated		
2003	Best Dress Designer	Manohar Sawant	Crew	Won		
2003	Best Director - Drama	Gautam Sobti	Crew	Won		
2003	Best Actress in a Negative Role - Drama	Urvashi Dholakia	Komolika Basu	Won		
2003	Best Star Cast	Ekta Kapoor	Kasautii Zindagii Kay Team	Won		
2003	Best Serial - Drama (Jury)	Ekta Kapoor	Kasautii Zindagii Kay Team	Won		
2003	Best Actress - Drama (Jury)	Shweta Tiwari	Prerna Basu	Won		
2003	Best Actor in a Comic Role - Drama	Sikandar Kharbanda	Indroneal Sen Gupta	Won	Nominated	
2003	Best Actress in a Negative Role - Drama	Ruby Bhatia	Maneka Bose		Nominated	
2003	Best Actor in a Supporting role - Drama	Deepak Qazir	Molloy Basu		Nominated	
2003	Best Actor in a Supporting role - Drama	Ronit Roy	Rishab Bajaj		Nominated	
2003	Best Actor - Drama (Jury)	Cezanne Khan	Anurag Basu		Nominated	
2003	Best Actress - Drama (Popular)	Cezanne Khan	Anurag Basu	Shweta Tiwari	Nominated	Prerna Basu
2003	Best Serial - Drama (Popular)	Ekta Kapoor	Kasautii Zindagii Kay		Nominated	
2003	2004	Best Art Director	Sourabh Tiwari	Crew	Nominated	Won
2003	2004	Best Director - Drama	Gautam Sobti & Ravindra Gautam	Crew		Won
Best Child Actress - Drama	2004	Shriya Sharma	Sneha Prerna Sharma			Won
Best Actress in a Negative Role - Drama	2004	Geetanjali Tikekar	Aparna Basu/Suchitra			Won
Best Actor in a Comic Role - Drama	2004	Sikandar Kharbanda	Indroneal Sen Gupta			Won
Best Actor - Drama (Popular)	2004	Cezanne Khan	Anurag Basu			Won
Best Serial - Drama (Jury)	2004	Ekta Kapoor	Kasautii Zindagii Kay			Won
Best Music	2004	Lalit Sen	Crew	Nominated		
Best Actress in a Negative Role - Drama	2004	Urvashi Dholakia	Komolika Basu	Nominated		
Best Actor in a Supporting Role - Drama	2004	Yash Tonk	Deboo	Nominated		
Best Actress in a Supporting Role - Drama	2004	Geetanjali Tikekar	Aparna Basu\Suchitra	Nominated		
Best Actor - Drama (Jury)	2004	Cézanne Khan	Anurag Basu	Nominated		
Best Actor - Drama (Popular)	2004	Cézanne Khan	Anurag Basu	Nominated		
Best Actress - Drama (Jury)	2004	Shweta Tiwari	Prerna Sharma	Nominated		
Best Actress - Drama (Popular)	2004	Shweta Tiwari	Prerna Sharma	Nominated		
Best Serial - Drama (Popular)	2004	Ekta Kapoor	Kasautii Zindagii Kay	Nominated		
2005	Best Actress in a Negative Role - Drama	Urvashi Dholakia	Komolika Majumdar	Won		
2005	Best Actor - Drama (Jury)	Cezanne Khan	Anurag Basu	Won		
2005	Best Lyrics	Nawab Arzoo	Crew	Won		
2005	Best Story Writer	Sonai Bhonsle	Crew	Nominated		
2005	Best Music	Lalit Sen	Crew	Nominated		
2005	Best Director	Hitesh Tejwani, Gautam Sobti & Ravindra Gautam	Crew	Nominated		
2005	Best Actress in a Supporting Role - Drama	Surveen Chawla	Kasak Bajaj	Nominated		
2005	Best Actress - Drama (Jury)	Shweta Tiwari	Prerna Basu	Nominated		
2005	Best Actress - Drama (Popular)	Shweta Tiwari	Prerna Basu	Nominated		
2005	Best Actor - Drama (Popular)	Cézanne Khan	Anurag Basu	Nominated		
2005	Best Serial - Drama (Jury)	Ekta Kapoor	Kasautii Zindagii Kay	Nominated		
2005	Best Serial - Drama (Popular)	Ekta Kapoor	Kasautii Zindagii Kay	Nominated		
2006	Best Actress in a Negative Role - Drama	Urvashi Dholakia	Komolika Majumdar	Won		
2006	Best Actor in a Negative Role	Ronit Roy	Rishab Bajaj	Won		
2006	Best Director - Drama	Ravindra Gautam & Gautam Sobti	Crew	Nominated		
2006	Best Actress in a Negative Role - Drama	Geetanjali Tikekar	Aparna Mahesh	Nominated		
2006	Best Actress in a Supporting Role - Drama	Tina Parekh	Mukti Deshmukh	Nominated		
2006	Best Actress - Drama (Jury)	Shweta Tiwari	Prerna Basu	Nominated		
2007	Best Art Director	Saurabh Tiwari	Crew	Won		
2007	Best Director - Jury	Qaeed Kuwajerwala, Ravindra Gautam & Gautam Sobti	Crew	Won		
2007	Best Actress in a Negative Role - Drama	Urvashi Dholaia	Komolika	Won		
2007	Best Actor in a Negative Role - Drama	Ronit Roy	Rishab Bajaj	Won		
2007	Best Serial - Drama (Jury)	Ekta Kapoor	Kasautii Zindagii Kay	Won		
2007	Best Serial - Drama (Popular)	Ekta Kapoor	Kasautii Zindagii Kay	Nominated		
2007	Best Music	Lalit Sen	Crew	Nominated		
2007	Best Actress in a Supporting Role - Drama	Jennifer Winget	Sneha Basu	Nominated		
2007	Best Actress - Drama (Popular)	Shweta Tiwari	Prerna Basu	Nominated		
2010	ITA Milestone Award	Ekta Kapoor, Shweta Tiwari, Cezanne Khan, and Urvashi Dholakia	Ekta Kapoor, Anurag Basu, Prerna Basu and Komolika Basu	Won		
2020	ITA Milestone Award	Ekta Kapoor, Shweta Tiwari, Cezanne Khan and Urvashi Dholakia	Ekta Kapoor, Anurag Basu, Prerna Basu and Komolika Basu	Won		

== Indian Telly Awards ==
The 'Indian Telly Awards' are annual honours presented by the company of Indian Television to persons and organisations in the television industry of India. The Awards are given in several categories such as best programme or series in a specific genre, best television channel in a particular category, most popular actors and awards for technical roles such as writers and directors.

Year	Category	Recipient	Character	Result
2002	Best Dress Designer	Manohar Sawant	Crew	Won
2002	Best Debut TV Programme	Ekta Kapoor	Kasautii Zindagii Kay	Won
2002	Best Drama Series (Jury)	Ekta Kapoor	Kasautii Zindagii Kay	Won
2002	Most Popular Drama Series	Ekta Kapoor	Kasautii Zindagii Kay	Nominated
2002	Most Popular Daily Series	Ekta Kapoor	Kasautii Zindagii Kay	Nominated
2002	Best Child Artiste - Female	Swapnali Kulkarni	Kukki Bajaj	Nominated
2002	Best Actor in a Lead Role	Cézanne Khan	Anurag Basu	Nominated
2002	Best Actress in a Lead Role	Shweta Tiwari	Prerna Basu	Nominated
2002	Best Actor in a Comic Role	Manish Gohil	Anupam Sen Gupta	Nominated
2003	Best Make-up Artist	Purohit Joker	Crew	Won
2003	Best Cinematography	Santosh Suryavansh	Crew	Won
2003	Best Direction	Gautam Sobti	Crew	Won
2003	Logitech Style Icon - Female	Ruby Bhatia	Maneka Bose	Won
2003	Best Actor in a Comic Role	Sikandar Kharbanda	Indroneal Sen Gupta	Won
2003	Best Actress in a Negative Role	Urvashi Dholakia	Komolika Basu	Won
2003	Best TV Personality (Male)	Cézanne Khan	Anurag Basu	Won
2003	Best Onscreen Couple	Cezanne Khan - Shweta Tiwari	Anurag Basu - Prerna Basu	Won
2003	Best Actress in a Lead Role - Jury	Shweta Tiwari	Prerna Basu	Won
2003	GR8! Ensemblance Cast - Drama	Ekta Kapoor	Kasautii Zindagii Kay	Won
2003	Best Drama Series (Jury)	Ekta Kapoor	Kasautii Zindagii Kay	Won
2003	Most Popular Daily TV Programme	Ekta Kapoor	Kasautii Zindagii Kay	Nominated
2003	Best Lyrics	Nawab Arzoo	Crew	Nominated
2003	Best Music Composer	Lalit Sen	Crew	Nominated
2003	Best TV Debutant (Female)	Geetanjali Tikekar	Aparna Basu	Nominated
2003	Best Actress in a Supporting Role	Geetanjali Tikekar	Aparna Basu	Nominated
2004	Best Dialogues Writer	Rekhha Modi	Crew	Won
2004	Best Direction	Qaeed Kuwajerwala & Ravindra Gautam	Crew	Won
2004	Best Creative Director	Ekta Kapoor	Kasautii Zindagii Kay	Won
2004	Best Continuing TV Programme	Ekta Kapoor	Kasautii Zindagii Kay	Won
2004	Best Drama Series (Jury)	Ekta Kapoor	Kasautii Zindagii Kay	Won
2004	Best Child Artiste - Female	Shriya Sharma	Sneha Prerna Sharma	Won
2004	Best Actor in a Supporting Role	Ronit Roy	Rishab Bajaj	Won
2004	Best Actress in a Supporting Role	Geetanjali Tikekar	Aparna Basu	Won
2004	Best Actress in a Negative Role	Urvashi Dholakia	Komolika Basu	Won
2004	Best Music Composer	Lalit Sen	Crew	Nominated
2004	Best Actor in a Supporting Role	Yash Tonk	Deboo	Nominated
2004	Best Actor in a Lead Role	Cézanne Khan	Anurag Basu	Nominated
2004	Bright ON Screen Couple	Shweta Tiwari & Cézanne Khan	Prerna Sharma & Anurag Basu	Nominated
2004	Most Popular Daily Serial	Ekta Kapoor	Kasautii Zindagii Kay	Nominated
2005	Best Art Director	Saurabh Tiwari	Crew	Won
2005	Best Music Composer	Lalit Sen	Crew	Won
2005	Best Actress in a Negative Role (Popular)	Urvashi Dholakia (shared with Rakshanda Khan)	Komolika Basu	Won
2005	Best Actress in a Supporting Role Critics	Jennifer Winget	Sneha Basu	Won
2005	Best Lyrics	Nawab Arzoo	Crew	Nominated
2005	Best Child Artiste - Female	Shriya Sharma	Sneha Basu	Nominated
2005	Best Actor in a Lead Role	Cezzane Khan	Anurag Basu	Nominated
2005	Best Actress in a Negative Role (Jury)	Urvashi Dholakia	Komolika Basu	Nominated
2005	Bright ON Screen Couple	Shweta Tiwari & Cézanne Khan	Prerna Sharma & Anurag Basu	Nominated
2005	Best Drama Series	Ekta Kapoor	Kasautii Zindagii Kay	Nominated
2005	Most Popular Daily Show		Kasautii Zindagii Kay	Nominated
2006	Best Costumes	Manohar Sawant	Crew	Won
2006	Best Lyrics	Nawab Arzoo	Crew	Won
2006	Coolest Face	Jennifer Winget	Sneha Basu	Won
2006	Best TV Personality (Male)	Ronit Roy	Rishab Bajaj (shared with Mihir Virani)	Won
2006	Best Actress in a Supporting role	Tina Parekh	Mukti Deshmukh	Won
2006	Best Actress in a Negative Role (Jury)	Urvashi Dholakia	Komolika Basu	Won
2006	Best Actor in Negative Role (Jury)	Karanvir Bohra	Prem Basu	Won
2006	Best Actress in a Negative Role (Jury)	Geetanjali Tikekar	Aparna Basu	Nominated
2006	Best Actress in a Negative Role (Popular)	Urvashi Dholakia	Komolika Basu	Nominated
2006	Best Actress in a Lead Role	Shweta Tiwari	Prerna Basu	Nominated
2006	Best Actor in a Lead Role	Cezzane Khan	Anurag Basu	Nominated
2006	Best Continuing TV Programme	Ekta Kapoor	Kasautii Zindagii Kay	Nominated
2006	Best Show with Social Message	Ekta Kapoor	Kasautii Zindagii Kay	Nominated
2006	Most Popular Drama Series	Ekta Kapoor	Kasautii Zindagii Kay	Nominated
2007	Best Actress in a Negative Role (Jury)	Urvashi Dholakia	Komolika	Won
2007	Best Direction	Qaeed Kuwajerwala, Hitesh Tejwani, Ravindra Gautam & Gautam Sobti	Crew	Won
2007	Best Drama Series (Jury)	Ekta Kapoor	Kasautii Zindagii Kay	Won
2007	Best Show with a Social Message	Ekta Kapoor	Kasautii Zindagii Kay	Nominated
2007	Best Continuing TV Programme	Ekta Kapoor	Kasautii Zindagii Kay	Nominated
2007	GR8! Ensemblance Cast	Ekta Kapoor	Kasautii Zindagii Kay	Nominated
2007	Best Drama Series (Popular)	Ekta Kapoor	Kasautii Zindagii Kay	Nominated
2007	Most Popular Daily Show	Ekta Kapoor	Kasautii Zindagii Kay	Nominated
2007	Best Child Artiste - Female	Rudrakshi	Kanishta	Nominated
2007	Best Actress in a Lead Role	Shweta Tiwari	Prerna Basu	Nominated
2007	Best TV Personality (Female)	Shweta Tiwari	Prerna Basu	Nominated
2008	SPL Recognision to One of The Best Ended Show	Ekta Kapoor	Kasautii Zindagii Kay	Won
2010	Best Actor of Decade	Ronit Roy	Rishab Bajaj (also shared for Mihir Virani)	Won
2010	Best Vamp on TV of Decade	Urvashi Dholakia	Komolika Basu	Won

== Asian Television Awards ==
Kasautii got the Asian Television Award from year 2000 - 2008 for most watching and awarded show rank at no. #2 in whole Asia.

Year	Category	Recipient	Character	Result
2000 - 2008	Asia's #2 Most Watched and Awarded Show	Ekta Kapoor	Kasautii Zindagii Kay	Won

== Star International Awards ==
Kasautii also won International awards in 2002, 2003, 2004, and 2007. The show was not only honoured in India but also abroad, too.

Year	Category	Recipient	Character	Result
2002	Internationally Most Stylish Icon - Female	Urvashi Dholakia	Komolika	Nominated
2002	Internationally Best Fictional Series of the World	Ekta Kapoor	Kasautii Zindagii Kay	Won
2003	Internationally Best Actress in a Negative Role - Fictional Serial Drama	Urvashi Dholakia	Komolika	Won
2003	Internationally Best Fictional Series of the World	Ekta Kapoor	Kasautii Zindagii Kay	Won
2003	Internationally Best Style Icon - Male	Ronit Roy	Rishab Bajaj	Nominated
2003	Internationally Best Style Icon - Female	Urvashi Dholakia	Komolika	Nominated
2003	Internationally Best Actor in a Lead Role - Fictional Series Drama	Cezanne Khan	Anurag Basu	Nominated
2003	Internationally Best Actress in a Lead Role - Fictional Series Drama	Shweta Tiwari	Prerna Sharma	Nominated
2004	Internationally Best Fiction Series of the World	Ekta Kapoor	Kasautii Zindagii Kay	Won
2004	Internationally Best Style Icon - Female	Urvashi Dholakia	Komolika	Nominated
2005	Internationally Best Style Icon - Female	Urvashi Dholakia	Komolika	Won

== Apsara Film & Television Producers Guild Awards ==
The Apsara Film & Television Producers Guild Awards are presented annually by members of the Apsara Producers Guild to honour Excellence in film and television.

Year	Category	Recipient	Character	Result
2003	Best Direction	Gautam Sobti & Qaeed Kuwajerwala	Crew	Won
2003	Best Serial - Fiction	Ekta Kapoor	Kasautii Zindagii Kay	Nominated
2003	Best Actor in a Lead Role - Fiction Series	Cezanne Khan	Anurag Basu	Nominated
2004	Best Serial of the Year - Fiction	Ekta Kapoor	Kasautii Zindagii Kay	Won
2004	Best TV Actor - Drama Fiction	Cezanne Khan	Anurag Basu	Won
2004	Best TV Actress - Drama Fiction	Shweta Tiwari	Prerna Sharma	Nominated
2005	Best TV Show	Ekta Kapoor	Kasautii Zindagi Kay	Nominated
2005	Best TV Actor	Cezanne Khan	Anurag Basu	Nominated
2005	Best TV Actress	Urvashi Dholakia	Komolika	Nominated
2007	Best TV Actress	Urvashi Dholakia	Komolika	Won
2007	Best TV Show	Ekta Kapoor	Kasatii Zindagii Kay	Won
2007	Best TV Actor	Ronit Roy	Rishab Bajaj	Nominated
2007	Best TV Actor	Cezanne Khan	Anurag Basu	Nominated
2007	Best TV Actress	Shweta Tiwari	Prerna Basu	Nominated

== Kalakar Awards ==
The Kalakar Awards are given by Bengali Federation of India to honour the Best in Regional as well as Hindi television and cinema.

Year	Category	Recipient	Character	Result
2002	Best Dress Designer - Fiction	Manohar Sawant	Crew	Won
2003	Best Make Up Artist	Pandhari Juker	Crew	Won
2003	Best TV Director	Gautam Sobti	Crew	Won
2003	Best TV Show	Ekta Kapoor	Kasautii Zindagii Kay	Won
2003	Best TV Actor - Female	Urvashi Dholakia	Komolika	Won
2003	Best TV Actor - Male	Ronit Roy	Rishab Bajaj	Nominated
2004	Best TV Actor	Cezanne Khan	Anurag Basu	Won
2004	Best Director	Gautam Sobti and Ravindra Gautam	Crew	Won
2004	Best TV Actress	Shweta Tiwari	Prerna Basu	Nominated

== Sansui Television Awards ==
Sansui awards awarded the awards to the following members of Kasauti in 2006.

Year	Category	Recipient	Character	Result
2006	Best Dress Designer	Manohar Sawant	Crew	Won
2006	Best Actress in a Supporting Role (Jury)	Tina Parekh	Devki Prem Basu	Won
2006	Popular Actress in a Supporting Role	Jennifer Winget	Sneha Basu	Won
2006	Best TV Personality	Ronit Roy	Rishab Bajaj	Won
2006	Best Actress	Shweta Tiwari	Prerna Basu	Nominated
2006	Best Actor	Cezanne Khan	Anurag Basu	Nominated
2006	Best Actress in a Negative Role	Urvashi Dholakia	Komolika	Nominated
2006	Best TV Fiction	Shobha Kapoor	Kasautii Zindagii Kay	Nominated
2007	Best Screenplay	Saba Mumtaz	crew	Won
2007	Best Costumes	Manohar Sawant	Crew	Won
2007	Popular Actress in a Negative Role	Urvashi Dholakia	Komolika	Won
2007	Best Fiction	Shobha Kapoor	Kasautii Zindagii Kay	Won
2007	Best Actress in a Negative Role	Urvashi Dholakia	Komolika	Nominated
2007	Best Actor	Cezanne Khan	Anurag Basu	Nominated
2015	Most Popular Show (Decade)	Ekta Kapoor	Team	Won
2015	Most Popular Actress in a Negative Role (Decade)	Urvashi Dholakia	Komolika	Won
2015	Most Popular Actress in Supporting Role (Decade)	Jennifer Winget	Sneha Basu	Won
2015	Most Popular Actress (Decade)	Shweta Tiwari	Prerna Basu	Won

== Zee Gold Awards ==
The Zee Gold Awards (also known as the Gold Television or Boroplus Awards) are honours presented excellence in the television industry. The Awards are given in several categories.

Year	Category	Recipient	Character	Result
2007	Gold Drama Series	Ekta Kapoor	Kasautii Zindagii Kay	Won
2007	Gold Actress in a Negative Role (Popular)	Urvashi Dholakia	Komolika	Won
2007	Gold Actress in a Lead Role (Critics)	Shweta Tiwari	Prerna Basu	Nominated
2007	Gold Debutant in a Lead Role	Kratika Sengar	Prerna Sneha Sharma	Nominated
2007	Gold Actress in a Supporting Role	Tina Parekh	Devki	Nominated
2007	Gold Actress in a Supporting Role	Jennifer Winget	Sneha Basu	Nominated
2007	Gold Actor in a Negative Role	Karanvir Bohra	Prem Basu	Nominated

== Golden Glory Awards ==
Year	Category	Recipient	Character	Result
2021	Most Iconic Television Actor	Urvashi Dholakia	Komolika	Won

== International Iconic Awards ==
Year	Category	Recipient	Character	Result
2021	Best Actor of Decade in Negative Role	Urvashi Dholakia	Komolika	Won
