= List of awards and nominations received by Hina Khan =

Hina Khan awards and nominations
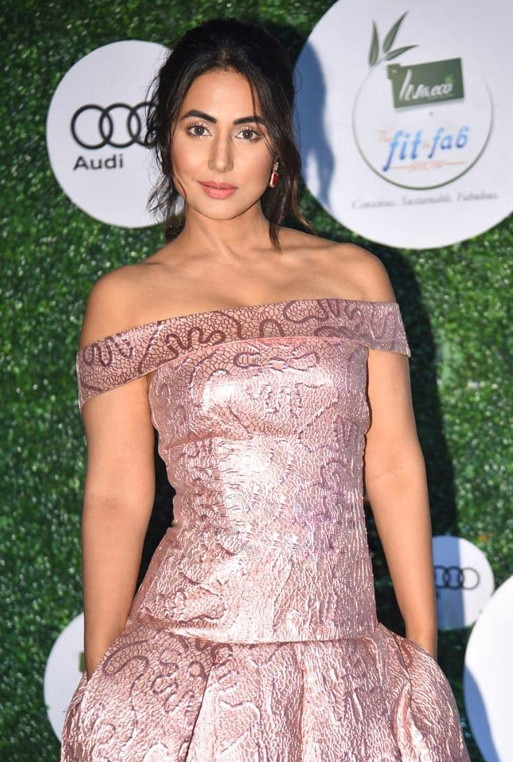
- Khan in 2021
Awards and nominations
Award	Wins	Nominations
Indian Television Academy Awards	3	4
Indian Telly Awards	3	6
Apsara Awards	0	1
Gold Awards	6	9
Nigar Awards	0	1
Gold Glam and Style Awards	2	2
Iconic Gold Awards	3	2
Bollywood Hungama Style Icons	1	2
Pinkvilla Screen and Style Icons Awards	1	0

Totals (Note: Certain award groups do not simply award one winner. They acknowledge several different recipients, have runners-up, and have third place. Since this is a specific recognition and is different from losing an award, runner-up mentions are considered wins in this award tally. For simplification and to avoid errors, each award in this list has been presumed to have had a prior nomination.)
- Wins: 20
- Nominations: 29

Hina Khan is an Indian actress who works in Hindi television along with films and web series. Khan has won several accolades mostly noted for Yeh Rishta Kya Kehlata Hai and is best known for playing Akshara in the series. She has received six Gold Awards, three Indian Television Academy Awards and three Indian Telly Awards. Khan has also seen playing grey role of Komolika in Star Plus popular Kasautii Zindagii Kay 2 which earned her the Gold Award for Best Actress in a Negative Role.

== Indian Television Academy Awards ==
The Indian Television Academy Awards, also known as the ITA Awards, is an annual event organised by the Indian Television Academy. The awards are presented in various categories, including popular programming (music, news, entertainment, sports, travel, lifestyle and fashion), best television channel in various categories, technical awards, and Best Performance awards.

Year	Category	Show	Character	Result	Ref.
2009	Best Actress (Popular)	Yeh Rishta Kya Kehlata Hai	Akshara Singhania	Won	
2010	Best Actress (Popular)	Yeh Rishta Kya Kehlata Hai	Akshara Singhania	Nominated	
2015	Best Actress (Popular)	Yeh Rishta Kya Kehlata Hai	Akshara Singhania	Won	
2023	Best Actress - OTT	Lines	Nazia	Won	

== Indian Telly Awards ==
The 'Indian Telly Awards' are annual honours presented by the company of Indian Television to persons and organisations in the television industry of India. The Awards are given in several categories such as best programme or series in a specific genre, best television channel in a particular category, most popular actors and awards for technical roles such as writers and directors.

Year	Category	Show	Character	Result	Ref.
2009	Fresh New Face (Female)	Yeh Rishta Kya Kehlata Hai	Akshara Singhania	Won	
2009	Best Actress in a Lead Role	Yeh Rishta Kya Kehlata Hai	Akshara Singhania	Nominated	
2010	Best Actress in a Lead Role	Yeh Rishta Kya Kehlata Hai	Akshara Singhania	Nominated	
2012	Best Actress in a Lead Role	Yeh Rishta Kya Kehlata Hai	Akshara Singhania	Nominated	
2019	Best Actress in a Negative Role	Kasautii Zindagii Kay	Komolika	Won	
2019	Best Actress in a Negative Role - Jury	Kasautii Zindagii Kay	Komolika	Won	

== Apsara Awards ==
The Apsara Film & Television Producers Guild Awards are presented annually by members of the Apsara Producers Guild to honour Excellence in film and television.

Year	Category	Show	Character	Result	Ref.
2012	Best Actress in Drama Series	Yeh Rishta Kya Kehlata Hai	Akshara Singhania	Nominated	

== Gold Awards ==
The Zee Gold Awards (also known as the Gold Television or Boroplus Awards) are honours presented excellence in the television industry. The Awards are given in several categories.

Year	Category	Show	Character	Result	Ref.
2010	Face of the Year	—N/a	—N/a	Won	
2010	Best Actress in a Lead Role	Yeh Rishta Kya Kehlata Hai	Akshara Singhania	Nominated	
2011	Best Actress in a Lead Role	Yeh Rishta Kya Kehlata Hai	Akshara Singhania	Nominated	
2012	Best Actress in a Lead Role	Yeh Rishta Kya Kehlata Hai	Akshara Singhania	Nominated	
2015	Best Actress in a Lead Role - Jury	Yeh Rishta Kya Kehlata Hai	Akshara Singhania	Won	
2016	Best Onscreen Jodi (with Karan Mehra)	Yeh Rishta Kya Kehlata Hai	Akshara Singhania	Won	
2018	Style Diva	—N/a	—N/a	Won	
2019	Best Actress in a Negative Role	Kasautii Zindagii Kay	Komolika	Won	
2019	Most Fit Actor (Female)	—N/a	—N/a	Won	
2019	TV Personality of the Year (Female)	—N/a	—N/a	Won	

== Gold Glam and Style Awards ==
Year	Category	Result	Ref.
2020	Diva of the Television Industry	Won	
2020	Diva (Female) Social Media	Won	

== Iconic Gold Awards ==
Year	Category	Show	Character	Result	Ref.
2021	Iconic Actress - OTT	Lines	Nazia	Won	
2023	Iconic Style Diva	—N/a	—N/a	Won	
2024	Pathbreaking Personality of the year	—N/a	—N/a	Won	

== Bollywood Hungama Style Icons ==
Year	Category	Result	Ref.
2023	Most Stylish Trailblazer	Nominated	
2025	Most Stylish Trailblazer of the Year	Won	

== Pinkvilla Style Icon Awards ==
Year	Category	Result	Ref.
2025	Super Stylish Charismatic Diva	Won	
