= List of awards and nominations received by Urvashi Dholakia =

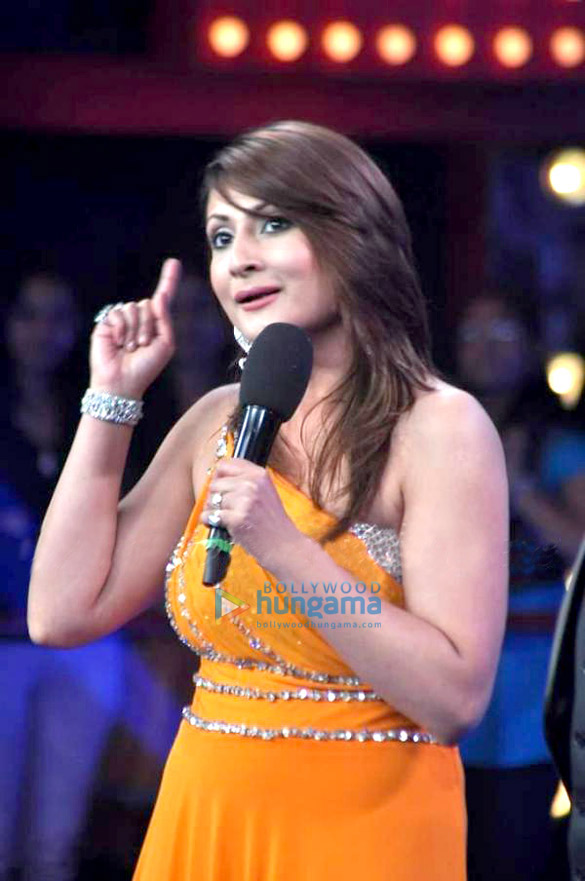
Dholakia on Bigg Boss 6 Grand Finale

Urvashi Dholakia is an Indian television actress, known as Komolika of Kasautii Zindagii Kay. Dholakia has won many awards for her Komolika (character).

== Indian Television Academy Awards ==
The Indian Television Academy Awards, also known as the (ITA Awards) is an annual event organised by the Indian Television Academy. The awards are presented in various categories, including popular programming (music, news, entertainment, sports, travel, lifestyle and fashion), best television channel in various categories, technical awards, and Best Performance awards.

Year	Category	Show	Character	Result
2003	Best Actress in Negative Role	Kasautii Zindagii Kay	Komolika	Won
2005	Best Actress in Negative Role	Kasautii Zindagii Kay	Komolika	Won
2006	Best Actress in Negative Role	Kasautii Zindagii Kay	Komolika	Won
2007	Best Actress in Negative Role	Kasautii Zindagii Kay	Komolika	Won
2010	ITA Milestone Award	Kasautii Zindagii Kay	Komolika	Won
2017	Best Actress in Negative Role	Chandrakanta	Rani Iravati	Won
2020	ITA Milestone Award	Kasautii Zindagii Kay	Komolika	Won
2025	ITA Milestone Award	Kasautii Zindagii Kay	Komolika	Won

== Indian Telly Awards ==
The 'Indian Telly Awards' are annual honours presented by the company of Indian Television to persons and organisations in the television industry of India. The Awards are given in several categories such as best programme or series in a specific genre, best television channel in a particular category, most popular actors and awards for technical roles such as writers and directors.

Year	Category	Show	Character
2003	Best Actress in Negative Role (Popular)	Kasautii Zindagii Kay	Komolika
2004	Best Actress in Negative Role (Popular)	Kasautii Zindagii Kay	Komolika
2005	Best Actress in Negative Role (Popular)	Kasautii Zindagii Kay	Komolika
2006	Best Actress in Negative Role (Critics)	Kasautii Zindagii Kay	Komolika
2007	Best Actress in Negative Role (Critics)	Kasautii Zindagii Kay	Komolika
2010	Best TV Vamp of Decade	Kasautii Zindagii Kay	Komolika

== Star International Awards ==
Year	Category	Show	Character	Result
2002	Internationally Best TV Style Icon (Female)	Kasautii Zindagii Kay	Komolika Basu	Nominated
2003	Internationally Best TV Vamp	Kasautii Zindagii Kay	Komolika Basu	Won
2003	Internationally Best TV Style Icon (Female)	Kasautii Zindagii Kay	Komolika Basu	Nominated
2004	Internationally Best TV Style Icon (Female)	Kasautii Zindagii Kay	Komolika Basu	Nominated
2005	Internationally Best TV Style Icon (Female)	Kasautii Zindagii Kay	Komolika Basu	Won

== Apsara Awards ==
The Apsara Film & Television Producers Guild Awards are presented annually by members of the Apsara Producers Guild to honour Excellence in film and television.

Year	Category	Show	Character	Result
2006	Best Actress in Television Drama Series	Kasautii Zindagii Kay	Komolika	Nominated
2007	Best Actress in Television Drama Series	Kasautii Zindagii Kay	Komolika	Nominated

== Gold Awards ==
The Zee Gold Awards (also known as the Gold Television or Boroplus Awards) are honours presented excellence in the television industry. The Awards are given in several categories.

Year	Category	Show	Character	Result
2007	Best Actress in Negative Role (Popular)	Kasautii Zindagii Kay	Komolika	Won
2007	Best Actress in Negative Role (Critics)	Kasautii Zindagii Kay	Komolika	Nominated

== Sinsui Television Awards ==
Sinsui awards awarded the awards to the following members of Kasauti in 2006.

Year	Category	Show	Character	Result
2006	Best Actress in Negative Role (Popular)	Kasautii Zindagii Kay	Komolika Basu	Nominated
2007	Best Actress in Negative Role (Critics)	Kasautii Zindagii Kay	Komolika Basu	Won
2015	Best Actress in Negative Role (Decade)	Kasautii Zindagii Kay	Komolika Basu	Won

== Kalakar Awards ==
The Kalakar Awards are given by Bengali Federation of India to honour the Best in Regional as well as Hindi television and cinema.

Year	Category	Show	Character	Result
2003	Favorite TV Actress	Kasautii Zindagii Kay	Komolika Basu	Won

== Golden Glory Awards ==
Year	Category	Show	Character	Result
2022	Iconic TV Actress	Kasautii Zindagii Kay	Komolika	Won

== Iconic Gold Awards ==
Year	Category	Show	Character	Result
2022	Iconic Best Negative tv Actress of the year:	Kasautii Zindagii Kay	Komolika	Won
