= Gold Award for Best Actress in a Negative Role =

Gold Award for Best Actor in a Negative Role - Female
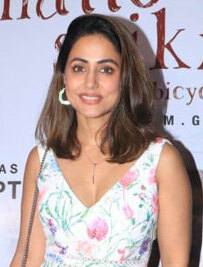
- The 2019 recipient: Hina Khan
- Awarded for: Best Performance by a Female Actor in a Negative Role on Television
- Country: India
- Presented by: White Leaf Entertainment
- First award: 2007 (for performances in TV shows in 2006)
- Currently held by: Hina Khan for Kasautii Zindagii Kay (Popular); Helly Shah for Sufiyana Pyaar Mera (Jury)
- Website: Gold Awards

Gold Award for Best Actress in a Negative Role is an award given by Zee TV as part of its annual Gold Awards for Indian television series and artists, to recognize an actor who has delivered an outstanding performance in a supporting role.

The award was first awarded in 2007 and since has been separated in two categories, Critics Award and Popular Award. Critics Award is given by the chosen jury of critics assigned to the function while Popular Award is given on the basis of public voting.

Anita Hassanandani has won 4 awards out of 4 nominations. Kanika Maheshwari and Kamya Panjabi have won 2 awards each with 3 and 2 nominations respectively.

== List of winners ==
=== 2000s ===
- 2007 Kamya Panjabi - Banoo Main Teri Dulhann as Sindoora Pratap Singh
  - Suvarna Jha - Kyunki Saas Bhi Kabhi Bahu Thi as Trupti
  - Nimisha Vakharia - Teen Bahuraaniyaan as Kokila
  - Aruna Irani - Maayka - Saath Zindagi Bhar Ka as Durga
  - Urvashi Dholakia - Kasautii Zindagii Kay as Komolika
  - Karishma Tanna - Ek Ladki Anjaani Si as Ayesha
  - Moonmoon Banerjee - Kasautii Zindagii Kay as Sampada
  - Ashwini Kalsekar - Kasamh Se as Jigyasaa
  - Sanjeeda Sheikh - Kayamath as Ayesha
- 2008 Sanjeeda Sheikh - Kayamath as Ayesha
  - Kamya Panjabi - Banoo Main Teri Dulhann as Sindoora
  - Ashwini Kalsekar - Kasamh Se as Jigyasaa
  - Suvarna Jha - Kyunki Saas Bhi Kabhi Bahu Thi as Tripti
  - Pallavi Subhash Shirke - Kasamh Se as Meera
- 2009 Not Held

=== 2010s ===
- 2010 Rashami Desai - Uttaran as Tapasya Thakur
  - Parvati Sehgal - Mann Kee Awaaz Pratigya as Komal
  - Hunar Hali - 12/24 Karol Bagh as Mili
  - Surekha Sikri - Balika Vadhu as Kalyani Devi
  - Meghna Malik - Na Aana Is Des Laado as Ammaji
  - Sushmita Mukherjee - Agle Janam Mohe Bitiya Hi Kijo as Gangiya
  - Usha Nadkarni - Pavitra Rishta as Savita Deshmukh
- 2011 Usha Nadkarni - Pavitra Rishta as Savita Deshmukh
  - Pratima Kazmi - Uttaran as Naani
  - Aashka Goradia - Laagi Tujhse Lagan as Kalavati Tai
  - Reshmi Ghosh - Tere Liye as Nupur
  - Shivshakti Sachdev - Afsar Bitiya as Pinky Raj
- 2012 Kanika Maheshwari - Diya Aur Baati Hum as Meenakshi Rathi
  - Pratima Kazmi - Uttaran as Naani
  - Eva Grover - Bade Achhe Lagte Hain as Niharika Kapoor
  - Usha Nadkarni - Pavitra Rishta as Savita Deshmukh
  - Jyotsna Chandola - Sasural Simar Ka as Billo
  - Mona Vasu - Parichay—Nayee Zindagi Kay Sapno Ka as Richa Thakral
- 2013 Kanika Maheshwari - Diya Aur Baati Hum as Meenakshi Rathi
  - Aanchal Khurana - Sapne Suhane Ladakpan Ke as Charu Mayank Garg
  - Jyotsna Chandola - Sasural Simar Ka as Billo
  - Mouli Ganguly - Kya Huaa Tera Vaada as Anushka Bhalla
  - Adaa Khan - Amrit Manthan as Amrit Kaur Sodi
  - Seema Mishra - Madhubala - Ek Ishq Ek Junoon as Deepali Bhatia
- 2014 Anita Hassanandani - Ye Hai Mohabbatein as Shagun Arora
  - Ashwini Kalsekar - Jodha Akbar as Mahamanga
  - Simone Singh - Ek Hasina Thi as Sakshi Goenka
  - Aashka Goradia - Bharat Ka Veer Putra – Maharana Pratap as Maharani
  - Monica Bedi - Saraswatichandra as Ghuman
  - Nigaar Khan - Main Naa Bhoolungi as Madhurima Aditya Jagannath
- 2015 Anita Hassanandani - Ye Hai Mohabbatein as Shagun Arora
  - Shraddha Arya - Dream Girl as Ayesha
  - Shweta Tiwari - Begusarai as Bindia
  - Tejaswi Prakash Wayangankar - Swaragini as Ragini
  - Additi Gupta - Qubool Hai as Sanam
  - Sarita Joshi - Meri Aashiqui Tum Se Hi as Hansa Parekh
  - Shikha Singh - Kumkum Bhagya as Aliya Mehra
  - Ashwini Kalsekar - Jodha Akbar as Mahamanga
- 2016 Anita Hassanandani - Ye Hai Mohabbatein as Shagun Arora
  - Shikha Singh - Kumkum Bhagya as Aliya Mehra
  - Adaa Khan - Naagin as Shesha
  - Sudha Chandran - Naagin as Yamini
  - Eva Grover - Tashan-e-Ishq as Anita Luthra
  - Achint Kaur - Jamai Raja as Durga Devi
- 2017 Anita Hassanandani - Ye Hai Mohabbatein as Shagun Arora (tied with) Kamya Panjabi - Shakti - Astitva Ke Ehsaas Ki as Preeto Singh
  - Shikha Singh - Kumkum Bhagya as Aliya Mehra
  - Pavitra Punia - Ye Hai Mohabbatein as Nidhi Chabbra
  - Riddhi Dogra - Woh Apna Sa as Nisha Jindal
  - Adaa Khan - Naagin (season 2) as Shesha
  - Sudha Chandran - Naagin (season 2) as Yamini
  - Aashka Goradia - Naagin (season 2) as Queen Avantika
- 2018 Shikha Singh - Kumkum Bhagya as Aliya Mehra
  - Pallavi Pradhan - Jiji Maa as Uttara Devi
  - Ruhi Chaturvedi - Kundali Bhagya as Sherlyn Khurrana
  - Aalisha Panwar - Ishq Mein Marjawan as Tara Raichand
  - Gauri Pradhan - Tu Aashiqui as Anita Sharma
  - Leena Jumani - Kumkum Bhagya as Tanushree Mehta
- 2019 Hina Khan - Kasautii Zindagii Kay as Komolika Anurag Basu
  - Shikha Singh - Kumkum Bhagya as Aliya Mehra
  - Ruhi Chaturvedi - Kundali Bhagya as Sherlyn Khurrana
  - Helly Shah - Sufiyana Pyaar Mera as Kaynaat Shah
  - Rakshanda Khan - Naagin (season 3) as Sumitra Sehgal
  - Antara Biswas -Nazar as Mohana

=== 2000s ===
- 2007 Urvashi Dholakia - Kasautii Zindagii Kay as Komolika

=== 2010s ===
- 2012 Mouli Ganguly - Kya Huaa Tera Vaada as Anushka Sarkar
- 2015 Shweta Tiwari - Begusarai as Bindiya Rani
