= Hina Khan =

Indian actress (born 1987)

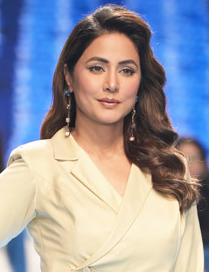
- Khan at an event in 2023
- Born: 2 October 1987 (age 39); Srinagar, Jammu and Kashmir, India
- Occupation: Actress
- Years active: 2009–present
- Spouse: Rocky Jaiswal (m. 2025)
- Awards: Full list

Hina Khan (pronounced [ˈɦiːnaː kʰaːn]; born 2 October 1987) is an Indian actress who appears in Hindi and Punjabi films and television. Born into a Kashmiri family in Srinagar, Khan moved to Delhi for higher education and thereafter shifted to Mumbai to pursue acting. Khan is noted for her versatility across genres—from family dramas and reality shows to psychological thrillers. One of the highest-paid television actresses in India, she is a recipient of several accolades including three ITA Awards, three Indian Telly Awards and seven Gold Awards.

Khan is widely recognised for portraying Akshara Maheshwari Singhania in Yeh Rishta Kya Kehlata Hai (2009–2016), her performances earned her two ITA Award for Best Actress - Popular. Khan emerged as the runner-up in the eighth and the eleventh seasons of the reality shows Fear Factor: Khatron Ke Khiladi (2017) and Bigg Boss (2017–2018). She then played the critically acclaimed negative character in the romantic television series Kasautii Zindagii Kay 2 from 2018 to 2019, which earned her the Gold Award for Best Actress in a Negative Role.

== Early life ==
Khan was born on 2 October 1987 in Srinagar, Jammu and Kashmir, India into an orthodox Kashmiri Muslim family. She has one younger brother, Aamir Khan, who is the owner of a travel agency company. She completed her Master of Business Administration (MBA) in 2009 from the CCA School of Management in Gurgaon. She moved to Mumbai at the age of 20 to pursue acting, without initially informing her parents. After she revealed her decision to act to her parents, her parents also moved to Mumbai to help her. Her father supported her decision on the condition that she finish her education, while her mother's friends and family cut ties with them over it.

== Career ==
=== Early work and rise to stardom (2008-2019) ===
Khan auditioned for Sony TV's singing reality show Indian Idol where she managed to be in the top 30 in 2008. Later, during her college studies in Delhi, Khan auditioned for Yeh Rishta Kya Kehlata Hai when her friends forced her and was selected for it. She moved to Mumbai and made her television debut in 2009, when she starred in one of the longest running Indian soap operas as Akshara Maheshwari Singhania. After eight years, she quit the show in November 2016 to pursue other projects. Her performance in the series earned her positive critical reviews and also won her multiple awards.

In 2017, she joined Colors TV's Fear Factor: Khatron Ke Khiladi 8 as a contestant, where she finished as the 1st runner up. In the same year, she participated in Colors TV's reality show, Bigg Boss 11 as a celebrity contestant where she emerged as the first runner up.

In late February 2018, she wrapped up the shooting of a Punjabi music video with Sonu Thukral, which released in March 2018. On 31 March, it was announced that she had signed in to make her digital debut with Ankoosh Bhatt's short film, 'SmartPhone', opposite actor Kunaal Roy Kapur. In July 2018, Hina appeared in a Sonu Thukral's Punjabi music video "Bhasoodi". In October 2018, she bagged the role of Komolika, an antagonist in Kasautii Zindagii Kay. She left the show in April 2019 and was replaced by Aamna Sharif. In the same year, she signed her debut film Lines, opposite actress Farida Jalal, which is directed by Hussain Khan and written by Rahat Kazmi and Shakti Singh.

=== Expansion and further career (2019-present) ===
On 2 January 2019, she signed another short film Soulmate, opposite actor Vivan Bhatena. The film was directed by Pawwan Sharma. In May 2019, she shot for Rahat Kazmi's short film "Wish List" opposite actor Jitendra Rai. In September, she began shooting for Rahat Kazmi's third film, the Indo-Hollywood' movie called 'The Country of the Blind' as Gosha. In the same month, she signed a psychological crime drama, digital series called Damaged 2.

In January 2020, she signed a ZEE5 horror film opposite actor Kushal Tandon. Khan played the main lead in a cameo appearance in the fifth season of Ekta Kapoor's Naagin along with Dheeraj Dhoopar and Mohit Malhotra. In February 2020, Khan made her Bollywood entry with the film Hacked, with director Vikram Bhatt, alongside Sid Makkar. In October 2020, Khan returned to Bigg Boss in its fourteenth season as a toofani senior along with Gauahar Khan and Sidharth Shukla for the first two weeks. In May 2021, Khan appeared in the music video song for T-Series song 'Patthar Wargi' alongside Tanmay Ssingh. In June 2021, Khan appeared in her next song 'Baarish Ban Jana' along with Shaheer Sheikh, which was shot in Kashmir. The song was sung by Stebin Ben and Payal Dev.

In September 2021, her Music Video 'Main bhi Barbaad' was released, opposite Angad Bedi sung by Yasser Desai. In March 2022, she announced her next web series titled Seven One where she's playing a cop. In 2024, she made her Pollywood debut in Shinda Shinda No Papa on Chaupal opposite Gippy Grewal. Since August 2025, she participated in Colors TV's reality show, Pati Patni Aur Panga as a Contestant along with her husband.

== Personal life ==
Khan is a Muslim Kashmiri and speaks the Kashmiri language fluently.

=== Marriage ===
In 2014, Khan started dating Yeh Rishta Kya Kehlata Hai's supervising producer Rocky Jaiswal. Her parents were initially shocked at her decision to date outside her religion, but later accepted it. The couple got married in June 2025.

=== Health ===
She revealed that she has asthma on the sets of the reality show Fear Factor: Khatron Ke Khiladi in 2017. In June 2024, she revealed that she is suffering from Stage-3 Breast cancer and confirmed that she is undergoing chemotherapy for the treatment.

== Other work and public image ==
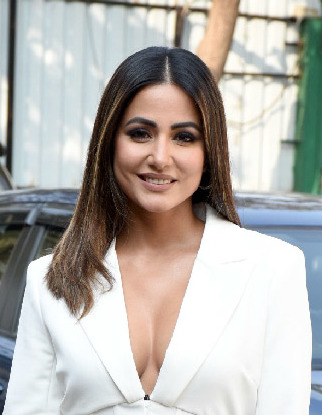
Khan in 2021

Khan has established herself as one of the leading and highest-paid actresses of the Hindi television, with her acting performances in the series - Yeh Rishta Kya Kehlata Hai and Kasautii Zindagii Kay 2. She was placed fourth in Rediff's "Top 10 television actresses" list. Khan earned the title of Sher Khan in Bigg Boss 11.

Khan was named in the Top 50 Sexiest Asian Women List by Eastern Eye in 2013, 2014, 2015, 2016, and 2017. In 2014, she was listed nineteenth among the "35 Hottest Actresses in Indian Television" by MensXP.com, an Indian lifestyle website for men. In 2018, Khan became the victim of trolling for posting the image of her teddy bear named Pooh, when saving her co-contestant Luv Tyagi during a task in Bigg Boss.

On 2 April, Khan walked the ramp for Streax Professional in Mumbai for marigold collection. She was awarded "Style Diva of Television Industry" at 11th Gold Awards. Khan appeared on the cover of FHM India December 2018 edition. Khan was named the Times of India's "Most Desirable Women on Television" in 2018 and 2019. Subsequently, she was also placed in the "Times 50 Most Desirable Women" list, at 19th in 2018 and at 29th in 2019. In 2018, Times ranked her 2nd in the Top 10 Popular Actress in Television. She was also ranked 18th in BizAsia's list of top 30 TV Personalities in 2020. In 2021, she revealed she was rejected for a role of a Kashmiri girl due to her dusky complexion, despite being Kashmiri and speaking the language fluently. In 2023, she ranked 2nd in Times Now "Popular Television Actresses" list. In April 2025, in the aftermath of the Pahalgam terrorist attack, Khan condemned the attackers "wholeheartedly, absolutely and unconditionally" and expressed sorrow at the deaths; Khan also apealed to Kashmiri Muslims to facilitate the return of displaced Kashmiri Hindus and asked other Indians not to alienate all Muslims for the acts of some.

In addition to her roles on television, Khan has also appeared as a guest in many other series. Her first guest appearance was in Kayamath in 2009 followed by Kis Desh Mein Hai Meraa Dil and Sabki Laadli Bebo. After that she appeared as a guest in Sapna Babul Ka... Bidaai, Saath Nibhaana Saathiya and Chand Chupa Badal Mein in 2010. In 2011 she appeared as a guest in Chef Pankaj Ka Zayka, a cooking show. In December 2016, Khan made an appearance on Bigg Boss 10, as a panellist to support her friend Rohan Mehra.

== Filmography ==
=== Films ===
Key
†	Denotes films that have not yet been released

Year	Title	Role	Notes	Ref.
2020	Smartphone	Suman	Short film	
2020	Hacked	Sameera Khanna		
2020	Unlock	Suhani		
2020	Wishlist	Shalini	Also co-producer	
2021	Lines	Nazia	Also co-producer	
2024	Shinda Shinda No Papa	Nikki	Punjabi film	
TBA	Country of Blind †	TBA	Hindi–English bilingual; also co-producer	

=== Television ===
Year	Title	Role	Notes	Ref.
2008	Indian Idol	Contestant	Auditioned / Top 30	
2009–2016	Yeh Rishta Kya Kehlata Hai	Akshara Maheshwari Singhania	Main role	
2017	Fear Factor: Khatron Ke Khiladi 8	Contestant	1st runner-up	
2017–2018	Bigg Boss 11	Contestant	1st runner-up	
2018–2019	Kasautii Zindagii Kay	Komolika Chaubey Basu	Main role	
2020	Naagin 5	Nageshvari aka Sarvashreshtha Adi Naagin	Extended cameo	
2020	Bigg Boss 14	Senior		
2022	Shadyantra	Natasha	Teleplay on Zee Theatre	
2023	Fear Factor: Khatron Ke Khiladi 13	Challenger		
2025	Pati Patni Aur Panga	Contestant	4th Runner-up	

==== Special appearances ====
Year	Title	Role	Ref.
2009	Kayamath	Akshara Maheshwari Singhania	
2009	Karam Apnaa Apnaa	Akshara Maheshwari Singhania	
2009	Kumkum – Ek Pyara Sa Bandhan	Akshara Maheshwari Singhania	
2009	Sabki Laadli Bebo	Akshara Maheshwari Singhania	
2009	Tujh Sang Preet Lagai Sajna	Akshara Maheshwari Singhania	
2009	Kasturi	Akshara Maheshwari Singhania	
2009	Kis Desh Mein Hai Meraa Dil	Akshara Maheshwari Singhania	
2009	Raja Ki Aayegi Baraat	Akshara Maheshwari Singhania	
2009	Perfect Bride	Akshara Maheshwari Singhania	
2010	Sapna Babul Ka... Bidaai	Akshara Maheshwari Singhania	
2010	Sasural Genda Phool	Akshara Maheshwari Singhania	
2011	Chand Chupa Badal Mein	Akshara Maheshwari Singhania	
2011	Chef Pankaj Ka Zayka	Akshara Maheshwari Singhania	
2011	Iss Pyaar Ko Kya Naam Doon?	Akshara Maheshwari Singhania	
2012	Saath Nibhaana Saathiya	Akshara Maheshwari Singhania	
2012	Teri Meri Love Stories	Akshara Maheshwari Singhania	
2012	Ek Hazaaron Mein Meri Behna Hai	Akshara Maheshwari Singhania	
2013	Masterchef - Kitchen Ke Superstars	Herself	
2013	Nach Baliye 6	Herself	
2014	Yeh Hai Mohabbatein	Akshara Maheshwari Singhania	
2015	Tere Sheher Mein	Akshara Maheshwari Singhania	
2015	Diya Aur Baati Hum	Akshara Maheshwari Singhania	
2015	Comedy Classes	Herself	
2016	Bahu Hamari Rajni Kant	Neha Khanna	
2016	Bigg Boss 10	Herself	
2016	Box Cricket League 2	Herself	
2017	Waaris	Herself	
2017	India Banega Manch	Herself	
2017	Bhaag Bakool Bhaag	Herself	
2018	Roop - Mard Ka Naya Swaroop	Herself	
2018	Bepannah	Herself	
2018	Bigg Boss 12	Herself	
2018	Kanpur Wale Khuranas	Herself	
2019	Khatra Khatra Khatra	Herself	
2019	Bigg Boss 13	Herself	
2019	Kitchen Champion	Herself	
2021	Pandya Store	Herself	
2021	MTV Forbidden Angels	Herself	
2021	Bigg Boss OTT	Herself	
2021	Bigg Boss 15	Herself	
2022	Swayamvar – Mika Di Vohti	Herself	
2024	Bigg Boss 18	Herself	
2026	Lock Upp 2	Herself	

=== Web series ===
Year	Title	Role	Notes	Ref.
2020	Damaged	Gauri Batra	Season 2	
2024	Namacool	Rubiya		
TBA	Seven One	Radhika Shroff		

=== Music video appearances ===
Year	Title	Singer(s)	Ref.
2018	"Bhasoodi"	Sonu Thukral	
2019	"Raanjhana"	Arijit Singh	
2020	"Humko Tum Mil Gaye"	Naresh Sharma and Vishal Mishra	
2021	"Bedard"	Stebin Ben	
2021	"Patthar Wargi"	Ranveer	
2021	"Baarish Ban Jaana"	Payal Dev and Stebin Ben	
2021	"Main Bhi Barbaad"	Yasser Desai	
2021	"Mohabbat Hai"	Stebin Ben	
2022	"Runjhun"	Vishal Mishra	
2023	"Barsaat Aa Gayi"	Shreya Ghoshal, Stebin Ben	
2024	"Halki Halki Si"	Asees Kaur, Saaj Bhatt	

== Accolades ==
For Yeh Rishta Kya Kehlata Hai, Khan has won two ITA Award for Best Actress - Popular, among three nominations.

== See also ==
- List of Hindi television actresses
- List of Indian television actresses
- List of Hindi film actresses
