= Shivshakti Sachdev =

Indian actress (born 1993)

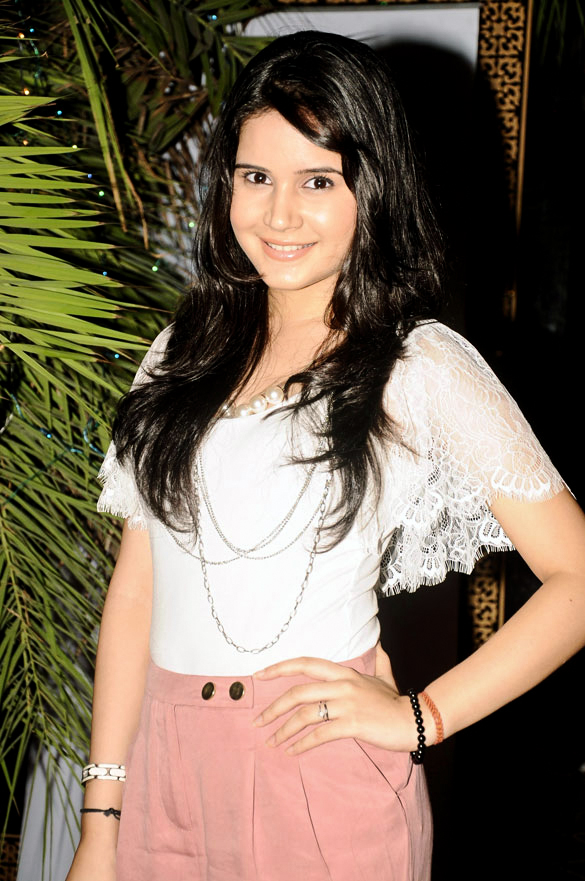
- Sachdev in 2011
- Born: 21 May 1993 (age 33); New Delhi, India
- Occupation: Actress
- Years active: 2007–2016; 2020
- Known for: Sabki Laadli Bebo; Afsar Bitiya; The Suite Life of Karan & Kabir; Amaram Akhilam Prema

Shivshakti Sachdev (born 21 May 1993) is an Indian actress who mainly works in Hindi television. She made her acting debut in 2007 with Bhabhi portraying Mehak Thakral. She is best known for her portrayal of Bebo Narang Malhotra in Sabki Laadli Bebo, Priyanka Raj in Afsar Bitiya and Rani Uberoi in The Suite Life of Karan & Kabir.

Sachdev made her film debut with the Telugu film Amaram Akhilam Prema in 2020.

== Early life ==
Sachdev was born on 21 May 1993 in New Delhi.

== Career ==
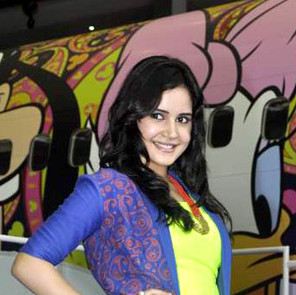
Sachdev in 2014

She has starred in Indian TV serials such as Sabki Laadli Bebo, Afsar Bitiya, Break Time Masti Time, The Suite Life of Karan & Kabir and Diya Aur Baati Hum and more along with many Indian TVC. She also had played the role of Saloni in an episodic show Gumrah - End Of Innocence. Her influences include Vidya Balan. In 2020, she acted in the Telugu film Amaram Akhilam Prema, her debut film.

== Filmography ==
=== Films ===
Year	Title	Role	Notes	Ref.
2020	Amaram Akhilam Prema	Akhila	Telugu film	released on Aha

=== Television ===
Year	Title	Role	Notes	Ref.
2007–2008	Bhabhi	Mehak Thakral		
2007	Hero - Bhakti Hi Shakti Hai	Neetu Shrivastava		
2008–2009	Break Time Masti Time	Pari		
2008	Balika Vadhu	Champa		
2009	Uttaran	Lali Thakur		
2009–2011	Sabki Laadli Bebo	Bebo Narang Malhotra/ Rano		
2011–2012	Afsar Bitiya	Priyanka "Pinky" Raj		
2012	Gumrah - End Of Innocence	Saloni	Season 2	
2012-2013	The Suite Life of Karan & Kabir	Rani Uberoi		
2013	Emotional Atyachar	Neha	Season 4	
2013	MTV Webbed	Kavya Rao	Episode: "Fall From Grace"	
2014	Yeh Hai Aashiqui	Bhoomi	Episode: "Love, Camera, Dhokha"	
2015	Diya Aur Baati Hum	Bulbul		
2015	Piya Rangrezz	Chanda		
2016	Khidki	Disha	Story: "Har Ek Friend Namuna Hotha Hai"	

== Awards and nominations ==
Year	Award	Category	Work	Result	Ref.
2009	Indian Telly Awards	Fresh New Face - Female	Sabki Laadli Bebo	Nominated	
2010	Gold Awards	Debut in a Lead Role (Female)	Sabki Laadli Bebo	Nominated	
2011	Gold Awards	Best Actress in a Negative Role	Afsar Bitiya	Nominated	
2012	Indian Telly Awards	Best Actress in a Negative Role	Afsar Bitiya	Nominated	
