= Amaram Akhilam Prema =

2020 Telugu romantic drama film

- Film poster
- Directed by: Jonathan Edwards
- Written by: Jonathan Edwards
- Produced by: Vevkds Prasad
- Starring: Vijay Ram; Shivshakti Sachdev
- Cinematography: Rasool Ellore
- Edited by: Mariappan
- Music by: Radhan
- Distributed by: Aha
- Release date: 18 September 2020
- Running time: 132 minutes
- Country: India
- Language: Telugu

Amaram Akhilam Prema is a 2020 Indian Telugu-language romantic drama film written and directed by Jonathan Edwards and produced by Vevkds Prasad. The film stars Vijay Ram and Shivshakti Sachdev along with Naresh, Annapoorna and Srikanth Iyengar in supporting roles. The music was composed by Radhan while cinematography was handled by Rasool Ellore and editing done by Mariappan. The film was released on Aha on 18 September 2020.

== Plot ==
Akhila (Shivshakti Sachdev) is a calm and introvert girl who loves her father a lot. Even her father loves her like his world. But she makes a mistake eloping with her boyfriend. Later she realises that he is not correct for her and returns. Not to know this that her father stops talking to her.

Heartbroken she decides to study civils as it is her father's dream and make him happy. She comes to her aunt's home for coaching. Amar (Vijay ram) a sweet heart who runs a bookstore with his dad eventually falls for akhila. He knows about her past that she is estranged from her father after making a mistake, Amar decides not to talk to her anymore.

On the results day she is qualified for Indian Administrative Service but still her father has no change of heart. Amar comes back and try to convince his father. Eventually Akhila too falls for Amar but is reluctant as she wants nothing more than her father's approval. The rest of the story is how Amar convinces her father and win his love.

== Cast ==
- Vijay Ram as Amar
- Shivshakti Sachdev as Akhila
- Naresh as Amar's father
- Srikanth Iyengar as Akhila's father
- Annapoorna as Akhila's grandmother
- Sri Lakshmi as Akhila's aunt
- Siva Reddy
- Ravi Siva Teja as Bujji

== Music ==
Music for the film was composed by Radhan. Lyrics for the songs were written by Rehman. On 16 September 2020, the first single "Tholi Tholi" was released by Madhura Audio.

== Release ==
The film was released through Aha on 18 September 2020 due to the COVID-19 pandemic.

== Reception ==
Thadhagath Pathi of The Times of India wrote that "despite having a good message, the film doesn't stick to its guns". Sangeetha Devi Dundoo of The Hindu noted the film tells "a familiar tale of love, bonding and egos".
