= Mitali Nag =

Indian television actress (born 1984)

- Born: March 18, 1984 (age 42); Nagpur, Maharashtra, India
- Occupation: Actress
- Years active: 2011–2022
- Spouse: Sankalp Pardeshi (m. 2014)
- Children: 1

Mitali Nag is an Indian television actress. She is known for portraying the role of Krishna Raj on Afsar Bitiya.

== Career ==
Nag began her acting career in 2011, when she was cast in Afsar Bitiya as Krishna Raj. In 2013, she bagged the role of Prerna in Dil Ki Nazar Se Khoobsurat. In the same year, she appeared in Fear Files: Darr Ki Sacchi Tasvirein. She also participated in Welcome – Baazi Mehmaan Nawazi Ki as a contestant. In early 2018, she was cast in Roop - Mard Ka Naya Swaroop as Kamla Shamsher Singh.

== Personal life ==
Mitali is married to Sankalp Pardeshi. She has one son.

== Filmography ==
=== Television ===
| Year | Serial | Role | Notes |
|---|---|---|---|
| 2011–2012 | Afsar Bitiya | Krishna Raj Singh | Lead role |
| 2013 | Dil Ki Nazar Se Khoobsurat | Prerna Periwal Shergill | Supporting role |
| 2013 | Fear Files | | Episodic role |
| 2014–2015 | Anudamini | | Supporting role |
| 2015–2016 | Draupadi | Rajkumari / Maharani Draupadi | Lead role |
| 2017 | Iss Pyaar Ko Kya Naam Doon 3 | Mrs. Raizada | Cameo role |
| 2018–2019 | Roop – Mard Ka Naya Swaroop | Kamalesh "Kamala" Kumari Singh Vaghela | Supporting role |
| 2020–2022 | Ghum Hai Kisikey Pyaar Meiin | Devyani Chavan Deshpande | Supporting role |

=== Reality shows ===
| Year | Show | Role |
|---|---|---|
| 2013 | Welcome – Baazi Mehmaan Nawazi Ki | Contestant |

=== Web series ===
| Year | Show | Role | Notes |
|---|---|---|---|
| 2022 | Aashiqana | Tejaswini | Negative role |

== Nominations ==
| Year | Award | Category | Work | Result |
|---|---|---|---|---|
| 2012 | Indian Telly Awards | Best Fresh New Face (Female) | Afsar Bitiya | Nominated |
| 2012 | Zee Rishtey Awards | Favorite Behen | Afsar Bitiya | Nominated |
| 2012 | Zee Rishtey Awards | Favorite Beti | Afsar Bitiya | Nominated |
