= Mohit Malhotra =

Indian television actor (born 1994)

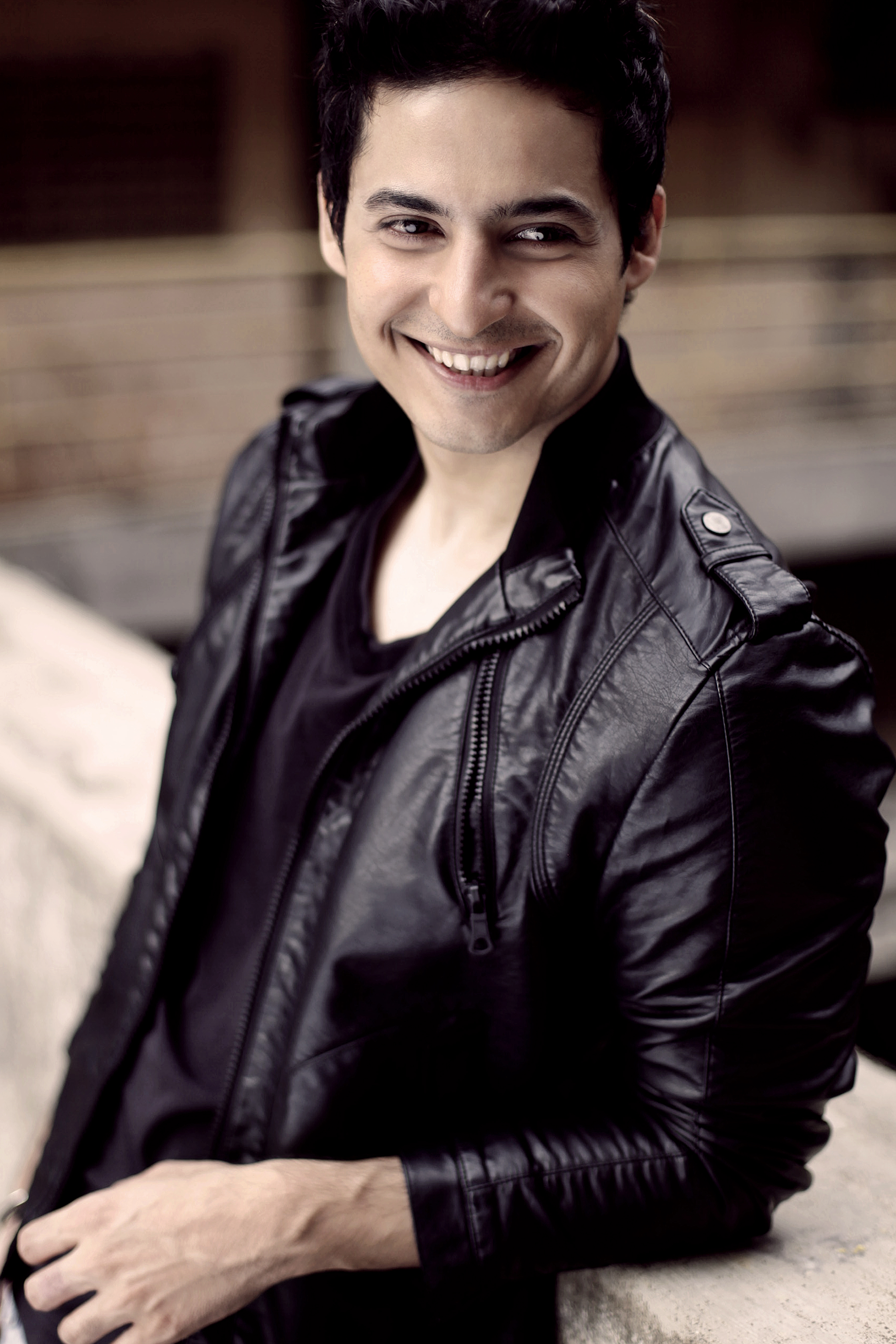
- Mohit Malhotra in 2009
- Born: 4 April 1986 (age 40); Delhi, India
- Occupation: Actor
- Years active: 2009–present
- Relatives: Himmanshoo A. Malhotra (brother); Amruta Khanvilkar (sister-in-law)

Mohit Malhotra is an Indian film and television actor. He is known for his participation in Splitsvilla 2 and his portrayal of Kartik Sharma in Bade Achhe Lagte Hain and Sid in Sasural Genda Phool. He made his film debut through Vikram Bhatt's psychological thriller Hacked.

== Career ==
Malhotra started his career as lead contestant with MTV's Splitsvilla 2 and appeared as the male protagonist in Mitwa Phool Kamal Ke as Birju.

In 2010, he appeared in Sasural Genda Phool as a Sid. In 2011, he was cast in Bade Achhe Lagte Hain as Kartik. In 2012, Malhotra played Vihaan in Kya Hua Tera Vaada and Ayaz in Gumrah: End of Innocence.

In 2013, he hosted as an anchor India's Dancing Superstar. He was also a part of Bindass' Mentals. In 2014, he also played a protagonist in anthology series Yeh Hai Aashiqui. Next, he portrayed Zubair Qureshi in Colors TV's Beintehaa.

In 2015, Malhotra played Yash as a parallel lead in Zee TV's Jamai Raja. In 2017, he played a protagonist as abhishek in &TV's Chupke Chupke. In 2018, he was seen as Raj in &TV's anthology horror series Laal Ishq.

From 2018 to 2019, he played a protagonist as Akarsh in &TV's Daayan. In 2020, he made his film debut in Vikram Bhatt's psychological thriller Hacked, opposite Hina Khan. In 2020, Mohit started his production house "Roots Entertainment" and music label "Roots Music' and also worked in Naagin 5 as Adi Naag Hirday alongside Hina Khan.

== Television ==
Year	Serial	Role
2009	MTV Splitsvilla 2	Contestant
2009	Mitwa Phool Kamal Ke	Birju
2010	Sasural Genda Phool	Sid
2011	Anhoniyon Ka Andhera	Vishal
2011	Nachle Ve with Saroj Khan	Contestant
2011–2012	Bade Achhe Lagte Hain	Kartik Sharma
2012	Gumrah: End of Innocence	Ayaz
2012–2013	Kya Huaa Tera Vaada	Vihaan
2013	India's Dancing Superstar	Host
2013	Mentals	Himself
2014	Yeh Hai Aashiqui	Mahesh Krishnan
2014	Beintehaa	Zubair Qureshi
2015–2016	Jamai Raja	Yash Mehra
2017	Chupke Chupke	Abhishek Awasthi/Abhi
2018	Laal Ishq	Shivam
2018–2019	Daayan	Akarsh Chaudhary
2020	Naagin 5	Hriday
2023	Bhagya Lakshmi	Vikrant Kakkar

=== Web Series ===
Year	Title	Role
2019	Maaya 3	Aarav Arora

=== Films ===
Year	Title	Role
2020	Hacked	Rohan Mehra

=== Music videos ===
Year	Title	Singer(s)
2015	Main Hoon Jhumroo	Kishore Kumar
2017	Kabhi Yaadon Mein	Palak Muchhal, Arijit Singh
2020	Sohna Sohna Munda	Miss Pooja
2020	Mehfooz	Arko
2020	Ab Na Phir Se	Yasser Desai
2024	Black Suit	Diljan
