= Hacked (film) =

2020 thriller film directed by Vikram Bhatt

- Theatrical release poster
- Directed by: Vikram Bhatt
- Written by: Govind Bhana
- Produced by: Krishna Bhatt; Amar Thakkar; Jatin Sethi
- Starring: Hina Khan; Rohan Shah; Mohit Malhotra; Sid Makkar
- Cinematography: Prakash Kutty
- Edited by: Kuldip Mehan
- Music by: Arko; Jeet Gannguli; Chirantan Bhatt; Sunny and Inder Bawra; Amjad Nadeem Aamir
- Production companies: Zee Studios; Loneranger Productions
- Distributed by: Zee Studios
- Release date: 7 February 2020 (India)
- Running time: 118 minutes
- Country: India
- Language: Hindi
- Budget: ₹4.50 crore
- Box office: ₹1.82 crore

Hacked is a 2020 Indian psychological thriller film written and directed by Vikram Bhatt and produced by Krishna Bhatt, Amar Thakkar and Jatin Sethi under their banner Loneranger Productions. The film stars Hina Khan, Rohan Shah and Mohit Malhotra. The story revolves about a boy's love for an older girl and how it turns into an obsession with him hacking her Life.

Principal photography commenced in August 2019. The film was theatrically released in India on 7 February 2020.

== Plot ==
Sameera "Sam" Khanna, an employee at a magazine company, lives next to Vivek Tiwari, a 19-year-old hacker who has a crush on her. Sam has a tenuous relationship with her boyfriend, actor Om Kapoor, who is inconsistent in his affections. At her birthday party, Om's absence upsets Sam. Vivek comforts her, leading to a brief romantic encounter. The following morning, Sam regrets the incident, but complications arise when Vivek begins interfering in her personal and professional life.

Vivek hacks Sam's laptop, leaking sensitive company files to retaliate against her boss, leading to Sam's dismissal. His escalating actions include publicizing intimate images of Sam and Om, causing Om to deny their relationship and leaving Sam devastated. Sam lodges a police complaint against Vivek after a series of confrontations, but Vivek manipulates his way out of custody and continues to harass Sam by hacking her social media.

Through her neighbor Rohan and Vivek's maid, Riya, Sam learns of Vivek's history of manipulative and abusive behavior, including actions that led to a classmate's suicide. When Vivek's grandmother threatens to expose his lies, he kills her. In the climax, Sam devises a plan to kill Vivek, erasing all evidence linking her to the crime. The case is closed without resolution, and Sam is shown leaving with Rohan, hinting at a new beginning.

== Cast ==
- Hina Khan as Sameera Khanna aka Sam
- Rohan Shah as Vivek Tiwari : Sam's Neighbour and Hacker
- Sid Makkar as Om Kapoor : Sam's ex Boyfriend
- Mohit Malhotra as Rohan Mehra : Sam's Childhood Friend
- Pravina Deshpande as Mrs. Tiwari (Vivek's grandmother)
- Sheetal Dabholkar as Nandini Sahai (Sam's boss)
- Garrvil Mohan as Dr. Ravi Sinha
- Tanvi Thakkar as Riya (Vivek's maid)

== Music ==
Hacked

Soundtrack album by Arko, Jeet Gannguli, Chirantan Bhatt, Sunny and Inder Bawra and Amjad Nadeem Aamir
- Released: 13 January 2020
- Recorded: 2019
- Genre: Feature film soundtrack
- Length: 26:53
- Language: Hindi
- Label: Zee Music Company
External audio
- Official Audio Jukebox on YouTube

The film's music is composed by Arko, Jeet Gannguli, Chirantan Bhatt, Sunny and Inder Bawra and Amjad Nadeem Aamir, with lyrics written by Arko, Amjad Nadeem, Shakeel Azmi, Manoj Yadav and Kumaar.

Track listing
No.	Title	Lyrics	Music	Singer(s)	Length
1.	"Mehfooz"	Arko	Arko	Arko	3:14
2.	"Ab Na Phir Se"	Amjad Nadeem	Amjad Nadeem Aamir	Yasser Desai	4:07
3.	"Tu Jo Mili"	Shakeel Azmi	Jeet Gannguli	Yasser Desai	3:40
4.	"Lavkar Love Karuya"	Manoj Yadav	Chirantan Bhatt	Apeksha Dandekar	2:57
5.	"Tujhe Hasil Karunga"	Kumaar	Sunny and Inder Bawra	Stebin Ben	3:56
6.	"Hacked Theme"	-	Sunny and Inder Bawra	-	1:21
7.	"Ab Na Phir Se" (Version 2)	Amjad Nadeem	Amjad Nadeem Aamir	Nikhita Gandhi	4:23
8.	"Mehfooz" (Version 2)	Arko	Arko	Akanksha Sharma	3:15
Total length:					26:53

== Release ==
The film was theatrically released in India on 7 February 2020.

== Reception ==
Moumita Bhattacharjee of Rediff.com gave the film 2.5 out of 5, writing, "Hacked has plenty of highs for Hina Khan fans but apart from that, there's not much to look for in the film." Mrinal Rajaram of The New Indian Express wrote, "Hacked follows the tried-and-tested formula of the stalker trope with a whole lot of tech stuff thrown in for good measure (half of which seems wildly implausible). The film, though largely overdone and melodramatic, does touch upon a relevant theme not explored enough in mainstream Hindi cinema. This theme is that of the Internet, and how you never really have your privacy once connected to the near-indispensable world wide web."

== See also ==
- Net (film)
