= Indian Telly Award for Best Actress in a Negative Role =

Television award

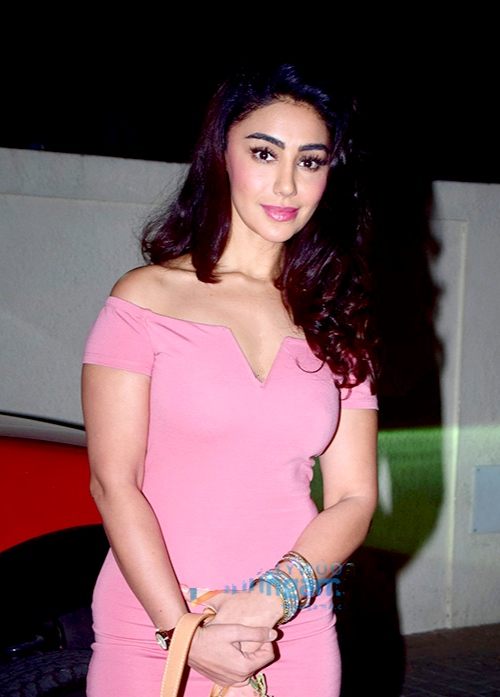
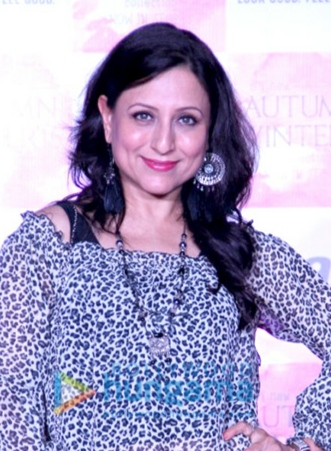
- The 2023 recipient: Mahek Chahal and Kishori Shahane
- Awarded for: Best Performance by a female actor in a Negative Role on Television
- Country: India
- Presented by: IndianTelevision.com
- First award: 2002 (for performances in TV shows in 2001)
- Currently held by: Mahek Chahal for Naagin 6 (Popular); Kishori Shahane for Ghum Hai Kisikey Pyaar Meiin (Jury)
- Website: Indian Telly Awards

Indian Telly Award for Best Actress in a Negative Role is an award given by Indiantelevision.com as part of its annual Indian Telly Awards for TV serials, to recognize a female actor who has delivered an outstanding performance in a negative role, that is in the role of an antagonist.

The award was first awarded in 2002. Since 2005, the award has been separated in two categories, Jury Award and Popular Award. Winner of Jury award is chosen by the jury of critics assigned to the function while Popular Award is given on the basis of public voting.

Urvashi Dholakia, Meghna Malik and Hina Khan are the only actresses who have won both Popular and Jury awards.

== Superlatives ==
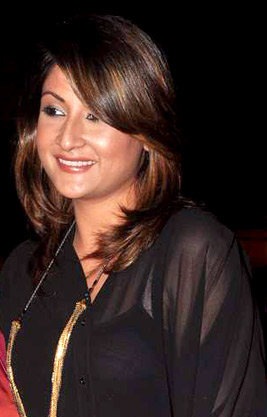
Urvashi Dholakia is 5-time winner of the award (popular & Jury's choice combine)

Superlative	Popular		Overall (Popular + Jury)	
Actress with most Awards	Urvashi Dholakia	3	Urvashi Dholakia	5
Actress with most Nominations	Urvashi Dholakia	6	Urvashi Dholakia	6
Actress with most Nominations (without ever winning)	Sudha Chandran	3	Sudha Chandran; Sushmita Mukherjee; Pratima Kazmi	3
Character with most Awards	Komolika	4	Komolika	7

== Popular Awards ==
=== 2001-2009 ===
- 2001 Not Awarded
- 2002 Shweta Kawatra - Kahaani Ghar Ghar Ki as Pallavi Aggrawal
  - Shweta Keswani - Des Mein Niklla Hoga Chand as Anu
  - Urvashi Dholakia - Kasautii Zindagii Kay as Komolika
  - Sudha Chandran - Kaahin Kissii Roz as Ramola Sikand
  - Jaya Bhattacharya - Kyunki Saas Bhi Kabhi Bahu Thi as Payal
- 2003 Urvashi Dholakia - Kasautii Zindagii Kay as Komolika
  - Shweta Kawatra - Kahaani Ghar Ghar Ki as Pallavi Aggrawal
  - Sudha Chandran - Kaahin Kissii Roz as Ramola Sikand
  - Mandira Bedi - Kyunki Saas Bhi Kabhi Bahu Thi as Mandira
  - Shweta Keswani - Des Mein Niklla Hoga Chand as Anu
- 2004 Urvashi Dholakia - Kasautii Zindagii Kay as Komolika
  - Tanaaz Currim - Yeh Meri Life Hai as Jayshree Bua
  - Rupali Ganguly - Sanjivani - A Medical Boon as Dr. Simran
  - Grusha Kapoor - Kehta Hai Dil as Lalita Devi
  - Shweta Kawatra - Kahaani Ghar Ghar Ki as Pallavi Aggrawal
  - Sudha Chandran - Kaahin Kissii Roz as Ramola Sikand
- 2005 Rakshanda Khan - Jassi Jaissi Koi Nahin as Mallika (tied with) Urvashi Dholakia - Kasautii Zindagii Kay as Komolika
  - Amrita Singh - Kkavyanjali as Nitya Nanda
  - Tasneem Sheikh - Kyunki Saas Bhi Kabhi Bahu Thi as Mohini
  - Poonam Narula - Kkusum as Mahi
- 2006 Ashwini Kalsekar - Kasamh Se as Jigyasaa Bali
  - Arzoo Gowitrikar - Ek Ladki Anjaani Si as Tulika Samarth
  - Urvashi Dholakia - Kasautii Zindagii Kay as Komolika
  - Aanchal Dwivedi - Saat Phere: Saloni Ka Safar as Kaveri
  - Navneet Nishan - Kyaa Hoga Nimmo Kaa as Parminder
- 2007 Kamya Panjabi - Banoo Main Teri Dulhann as Sindoora
  - Suvarna Jha - Kyunki Saas Bhi Kabhi Bahu Thi as Trupti
  - Nimisha Vakharia - Teen Bahuraaniyaan as Kokila
  - Aruna Irani - Maayka - Saath Zindagi Bhar Ka as Durga
  - Urvashi Dholakia - Kasautii Zindagii Kay as Komolika
  - Karishma Tanna - Ek Ladki Anjaani Si as Ayesha
  - Moonmoon Banerjee - Kasautii Zindagii Kay as Sampada
  - Ashwini Kalsekar - Kasamh Se as Jigyasaa
  - Sanjeeda Sheikh - Kayamath as Ayesha
- 2008 Surekha Sikri - Balika Vadhu as Kalyani Devi
  - Kamya Panjabi - Banoo Main Teri Dulhann as Sindoora
  - Sanjeeda Sheikh - Kayamath as Ayesha
  - Suvarna Jha - Kyunki Saas Bhi Kabhi Bahu Thi as Tripti
  - Pallavi Subhash Shirke - Kasamh Se as Meera
- 2009 Meghna Malik - Na Aana Is Des Laado as Ammaji
  - Surekha Sikri - Balika Vadhu as Kalyani Devi
  - Rashami Desai - Uttaran as Tapasya
  - Rasika Joshi - Bandini as Tarulata/Motiben
  - Sushmita Mukherjee - Agle Janam Mohe Bitiya Hi Kijo as Gangiya

=== 2010-present ===
- 2010 Rashami Desai - Uttaran as Tapasya
  - Parvati Sehgal - Mann Kee Awaaz Pratigya as Komal
  - Hunar Hali - 12/24 Karol Bagh as Mili
  - Surekha Sikri - Balika Vadhu as Kalyani Devi
  - Meghna Malik - Na Aana Is Des Laado as Ammaji
  - Sushmita Mukherjee - Agle Janam Mohe Bitiya Hi Kijo as Gangiya
- 2011 No Award
- 2012 Kanika Maheshwari - Diya Aur Baati Hum as Meenakshi Vikram Rathi
  - Usha Nadkarni - Pavitra Rishta as Savita Damodar Deshmukh
  - Eva Grover - Bade Achhe Lagte Hain as Niharika Kapoor
  - Mona Vasu - Parichay—Nayee Zindagi Kay Sapno Ka as Richa Thakral
  - Shivshakti Sachdev - Afsar Bitiya as Pinky Raj
- 2013 Aanchal Khurana - Sapne Suhane Ladakpan Ke as Charu Mayank Garg
  - Jyotsana Chandola - Sasural Simar Ka as Billo
  - Mouli Ganguly - Kya Huaa Tera Vaada as Anushka Bhalla
  - Adaa Khan - Amrit Manthan as Amrit Kaur Sodi
  - Seema Mishra - Madhubala - Ek Ishq Ek Junoon as Deepali Bhatia
- 2014 Ashwini Kalsekar - Jodha Akbar as Mahamanga (tied with) Simone Singh - Ek Hasina Thi as Sakshi Goenka
  - Aashka Goradia - Bharat Ka Veer Putra – Maharana Pratap as Maharani
  - Monica Bedi - Saraswatichandra as Ghuman
  - Nigaar Khan - Main Naa Bhoolungi as Madhurima Aditya Jagannath
  - Anita Hassanandani Reddy - Yeh Hai Mohabbatein as Shagun Arora
- 2015 Shraddha Arya - Dream Girl as Ayesha
  - Shweta Tiwari - Begusarai as Bindia
  - Tejaswi Prakash Wayangankar -Swaragini as Ragini
  - Anita Hassanandani - Yeh Hai Mohabbatein as Shagun
  - Additi Gupta - Qubool Hai as Sanam
- 2016 No Award
- 2017 No Award
- 2018 No Award
- 2019 Hina Khan - Kasautii Zindagii Kay as Komolika
  - Parineeta Borthakur - Bepannah as Anjana Hooda
  - Antara Biswas - Nazar as Mohna
  - Shubhavi Choksey - Kasautii Zindagii Kay (2018) as Mohini Basu
  - Aalisha Panwar - Ishq Mein Marjawan as Tara Raichand
  - Anjali Anand - Kullfi Kumarr Bajewala as Lovely Singh
  - Reyhna Malhotra - Manmohini as Mohini
  - Gauri Pradhan - Tu Aashiqui as Anita Sharma
  - Leena Jumani - Kumkum Bhagya as Tanushree Mehta
- 2020 No Award
- 2021 No Award
- 2022 No Award
- 2023 Mahek Chahal - Naagin 6 as Mahek Ahlawat
  - Ankita Bahuguna - Pandya Store as Shweta Patel
  - Isha Malviya - Udaariyaan as Jasmine Sandhu
  - Reyhna Malhotra - Kumkum Bhagya as Alia Mehra
  - Seerat Kapoor - Imlie as Cheeni Tripathi

== Jury Award ==
=== 2005-2009 ===
- 2005 Amrita Singh - Kkavyanjali as Nitya Nanda
- 2006 Urvashi Dholakia - Kasautii Zindagii Kay as Komolika
- 2007 Urvashi Dholakia - Kasautii Zindagii Kay as Komolika
- 2008 Not Awarded
- 2009 No Awarded

=== 2010-present ===
- 2010 Meghna Malik - Na Aana Is Des Laado as Ammaji
  - (No prior nominations)
- 2011 No Award
- 2012 Asmita Sharma - Mann Kee Awaaz Pratigya as Sumitra Thakur
  - Usha Nadkarni - Pavitra Rishta as Savita Deshmukh
  - Sushmita Mukherjee - Ek Nayi Chhoti Si Zindagi as Devki
  - Pratima Kazmi - Uttaran as Sumitra Devi
  - Sheeba Chaddha - Na Aana Is Des Laado as Bajri
  - Aashka Goradia - Laagi Tujhse Lagan as Kalavati
- 2013 Adaa Khan - Amrit Manthan as Amrit Kaur Sodi
  - Krutika Desai - Uttaran as Ekadashi Avinash Chatterjee
  - Pratima Kazmi - Uttaran as Sumitra Devi (Nani)
  - Asmita Sharma - Mann Kee Awaaz Pratigya as Sumitra Thakur
  - Alka Kaushal - Qubool Hai as Raziya Mumani
- 2014 Nigaar Khan - Main Naa Bhoolungi as Madhurima Jagannath
  - Krutika Desai - Uttaran as Ekadashi Chatterjee
  - Pratima Kazmi - Uttaran as Nani
  - Nigaar Khan - Buddha - Rajaon Ka Raja as Mangala
  - Shivani Tanksale - 24 (Indian TV series) as Divya Maurya
- 2015 Shweta Tiwari - Begusarai as Bindia
- 2019 Hina Khan - Kasautii Zindagii Kay 2 as Komolika
- 2023 Kishori Shahane - Ghum Hai Kisikey Pyaar Meiin as Bhavani Nagesh Chavan

== Milestone ==
=== 2000 - 2010 ===
- 2010 Urvashi Dholakia - Kasautii Zindagii Kay as Komolika
