= Akshara Maheshwari Singhania =

Fictional character from Yeh Rishta Kya Kehlata Hai

- Yeh Rishta Kya Kehlata Hai character
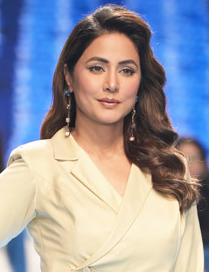
- Hina Khan as Akshara Maheshwari
- First appearance: 2009
- Last appearance: 2016
- Created by: Rajan Shahi
- Portrayed by: Hina Khan

In-universe information
- Full name: Akshara Maheshwari Singhania
- Gender: Female
- Occupation: Businesswoman; Teacher
- Religion: Hinduism
- Origin: Udaipur, Rajasthan, India
- Nationality: Indian
- Affiliation: Maheshwaris (paternal family); Goyels (maternal family); Singhanias (in-laws/descentants); Naitik Singhania (husband)

Akshara Maheshwari Singhania is the protagonist of the first generation in the television series Yeh Rishta Kya Kehlata Hai played by Hina Khan. Created by Rajan Shahi under Director's Kut Productions, the series became a cultural phenomenon, particularly due to Akshara's character, which resonates with viewers on multiple levels. Akshara is regarded among the most memorable characters in Indian television..

== Development ==
Rajan Shahi cast college student Hina Khan to play Akshara, marking her acting debut. Khan stated that she knew nothing about acting while signing the series, saying, "I didn't learn acting from anywhere. I think it's because of luck that I landed up in TV. Even after that I had to do a lot of hard work. It was more difficult for me when I began acting and straight away I had to perform. I never got to learn". In November 2016, Khan left the show to explore more projects.

== Characterization ==
Akshara is a kind-hearted and soft-spoken girl from Udaipur, who is known for her positive nature. She is educated and belongs to the Maheshwari family, a wealthy Marwari joint family recognised for their hotel business. Akshara is shown as a dutiful daughter. Khan's portrayal of the character has a blend of warmth, strength, and emotional depth.

== Styling ==
As a Rajasthani girl, the character of Akshara was seen wearing heavy jewellers and traditional dresses. Initially, Khan wore salwar-kameez. Her post marriage look saw her wear saree with jewelleries. During festive celebrations, Khan wore heavy lehenga to embrace the culture of Rajasthan. Following a leap, when her character shifted to Cape Town and later back to India, Khan sported a more modern look, including tops and palazzos.

== Legacy and influence ==
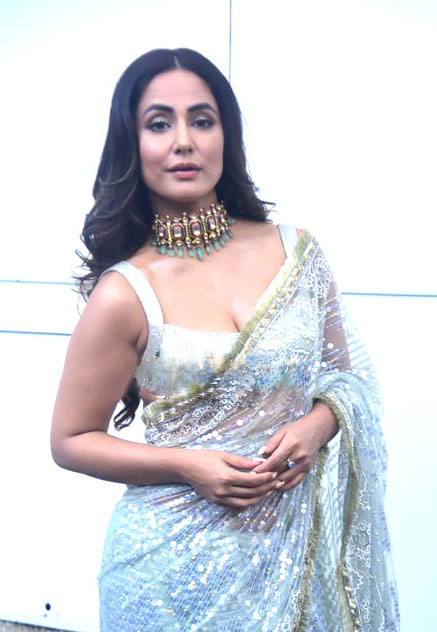
Akshara's character established Hina Khan among television's highest paid actresses.

Khan's portrayal of Akshara has garnered significant acclaim, establishing her as a popular character in Indian television. Her performance has contributed to the show's longevity and earned her several accolades. Khan's on-screen pairing with Karan Mehra has garnered significant attention, with fans frequently expressing their admiration for the couple. Several publications like Pinkvilla and News18 termed Akshara among the "most iconic characters" of Indian television. The popularity of the series and her character established Khan among the highest paid and most popular actresses of Indian television.

== See also ==
- Hina Khan
- Yeh Rishta Kya Kehlata Hai
