= Power of Paanch =

- Release poster
- Genre: Superhero
- Written by: Maithili Desai
- Screenplay by: Arshad Jafri; Sumrit Sahri
- Directed by: Iqbal Rizvi; Jeetu Arora
- Creative director: Prabhjyot Gujraal
- Country of origin: India
- Original language: Hindi
- No. of episodes: 50

Production
- Producers: Ekta Kapoor; Shobha Kapoor
- Cinematography: Raju Gauli; Ankush Ram Birajdar
- Editor: Uday Chaudhary
- Running time: 19–26 minutes
- Production company: Balaji Telefilms

Original release
- Network: Disney+ Hotstar
- Release: 17 January – 4 April 2025

Power of Paanch is an Indian Hindi-language superhero television series. Produced by Ekta Kapoor and Shobha Kapoor under Balaji Telefilms, it stars Riva Arora, Jaiveer Juneja, Aditya Arora, Anubha Arora, Bianca Arora, Yash Sehgal, Barkha Bisht and Urvashi Dholakia. The series premiered on 17 January 2025 on Disney+ Hotstar. It ended on 4 April 2025 after completing 50 episodes.

== Plot ==
Bela Luthra, an 18-year-old girl, and her mother Tabu Luthra, a single parent, live in Boisar, Maharashtra. One night, Tabu leaves on an assignment with her research team, prompting Bela to search the restricted areas of her home. She discovers her mother's connections with the town of Panchgiri and the age-old myth claiming that the five elements secretly live a human life. While the parents of the current power holders of the four elements search for the "Fifth element", Bela travels to Panchgiri and sets out on a mission to unveil the secrets of Panchgiri.

The story tells that on their 16th birthday, the powers of the parents are inherited by their first-born child. As per this, Ranveer, Ali, Baggu and Jhanvi become the power holders of the four elemental powers (air, fire, water, and earth respectively).

To find her mother, Bela travels to Panchgiri. She gets to know that Tanu Shergill is her mother's twin sister. Tanu tries to damage Bela's hands by a car accident which fails. Bela soon finds out that she is the Earth element as she was born three months before Jhanvi, who fakes being a power holder. It is soon found out that Tanu's younger son Kai is the "Life element" when he comes back to life after dying from an accident. It is also revealed that Param gave Kai to Tanu when she faced a miscarriage during her second child delivery. Karthik reveals that on a day when five stars come in a straight line was suitable for opening the ancient box with help of the five elements. Tanu plans with Param to secretly damage Bela's hands to get the powers transferred to Jhanvi. But everyone finds out that Jhanvi was not the Earth element. Finally, the box is opened, with a book inside it written in an ancient language which only Tabu could read. Bela has a fight with Tanu and disappears for 3 weeks. The Blue Jeans Cafe opens in Panchgiri.

Baggu and Ali face love complications due to Adeeba being in a relationship with Ali. Ali faces an accident with a mysterious girl and reaches Panchgiri Inn. Soon, Ali and Baggu find out that Bela and her best friend Ahaan are working there. The mysterious girl disappears from the hospital to the surprise of Aasma (Ali's mom and DGP of Panchgiri). Jhanvi and Karan grow closer and Ahaan gets a job at Blue Jeans Cafe. Karthik tells Aasma that evil powers have arrived.

Mr. Sidh, an industrialist, instructs his adopted daughter Myra to get close with Ranveer. Myra and Mr. Sidh manipulate Ranveer that he could bring the potential power of the five elements. Meanwhile, Bela is searching for her mother Tabu (Bela's mother) when an unknown girl Tanya takes admission in the college. Bela grows anxious when Tanya grows a fast friendship with his friends. Meanwhile, Adeeba blackmails Ali and his mother, due to that reason Ali had to break up with Baggu.

Mr. Sidh reveals that Ahaan (Bela's best friend) is his son, and Karan too. He instructs Ahaan that all the five elements should touch the crystal so that the crystal absorbs the energies of the five elements. In the semifinal and in the final match, Ranveer uses his power and wins the final match. Karan told Bela that he knows about the five elements and he wants to save them, but Mr. Sidh and Myra captured Karan and Bela, and Bela gets to know about Ahaan's identity. They traveled to Sidh's house where Ranveer and his friends were enjoying a party. Myra and Ahaan tie Bela, Ranveer, Kai, and Karan when Kai's real powers get opened.

Aasma, Kartik, and Tanu arrive in Sidh's house, meanwhile Ranveer uses his power to get the crystal from Kai. Bela and Baggu attack Ranveer while Kai runs with the crystal. Aasma arrives in time and saves the kids and arrests Mr. Sidh, meanwhile Myra runs away. Bela and Karan had a romantic moment.

Bela gets to know the truth of Tanya, that she is her mother for Kai's powers. Bela, Ranveer, Ali, Baggu, and Kai get to know about the backstory of elements, and they must defeat the evil forces for their immortality. Aasma starts to train the elements to face vin. Tanu becomes the dean of the High Crest university and is shocked to see the new donor Payal Chauhan, a wealthy lady. Tanu and Aasma try to uncover Payal Chauhan's true identity, meanwhile Ranveer starts to work on Blue Jeans Cafe with Bela and Karan. Payal Chauhan's growing influence to buy the High Crest University makes Kai and the other students protest against the selling. Bela finds out about Payal Chauhan's true identity, meanwhile Ahaan rejoins the college, which shocks the elements.

On prom proposal day, Baggu meets a new student, Zain, and Ali gets jealous of Baggu and Zain. The elements are doing their training but they can't coordinate with each other. Meanwhile, Tanu gets to know about Tanya's real identity, Kai uses his powers and transforms Tanya into Tabu, and Tanu gets angry at Tabu. Tanu tells that Tabu killed a girl named Poonam Mishra that night, which forced Tabu to leave Panchgiri. Bela, Ranveer and Karan clash over trust and secrets. Kai returns to High Crest but plans to protest against the college selling.

While planning the protest, he gets a box belonging to his grandfather; Kai's grandmother tells him about the box and his grandfather. Tabu comes to her house to meet her mother and to take important documents of her father. While Ranveer confesses to Bela that he has feelings for her, Bela gets worried about what she should do now. Finally, Bela breaks her relationship with Karan for Ranveer, and Bela and Karan have an emotional conversation; Karan gets angry at Bela's decision. While Ranveer comes back to take his charger from the training spot, he sees Tabu there searching for something; because of this, Ranveer suspects Tabu, but after Bela gets to know about this, she gets angry with Ranveer. Meanwhile, Payal, Ahaan, and Myra plan to take down the elements. Bela, Ranveer, Ali and Baggu fight with each other while Kartik stops them and tells them that danger has come. While Kai gets a shock to see Adeeba and Ahaan's conversation with each other, Kai tries to call Baggu but he fails; when he becomes senseless, he sees that Payal kidnapped him.

Bela, Ranveer, Ali, Baggu and their family members get tense not finding Kai while the elements have to get ready for the fight. Bela, Ranveer, Ali, Baggu arrive at the prom night while searching for Kai, meanwhile Payal Chauhan arrives while the students start to protest against her. Ahaan rings the fire alarm of the college; all the students get out of there. The elements attack Payal and Ahaan.

== Cast ==
- Riva Arora as Bela Luthra: Tabu's daughter; an 18-year-old girl from Besar, who houses the powers of the "Earth" element. Still unaware of the truth of her newfound powers, she is on a mission to unveil the secrets of Panchgiri. (2025–present)
- Anubha Arora as Adeeba; Ali's girlfriend who is madly in love with him, while Ali wants to break up with her. She's unaware of the world of powers and navigates her way through the secrets, finding her path to Ali. (2025–present)
- Jaiveer Juneja as Ranveer Deol: Param's son; Kai's half-brother; Ali's best-friend; Bela's admirer; Jhanvi's situationship partner; an 18-year-old boy, who houses the powers of the "Wind" element. He appears to be a playboy, but is a sensitive person. (2025–present)
- Aditya Arora as Ali Mazhar: Aasma's son; Ranveer's best-friend; Baggu's admirer; an 18-year-old boy, who houses the "Fire" element. He is upset of his relationship with Adeeba and wants to end it. He often loses control on his powers. (2025–present)
- Bianca Arora as Baggu: Kartik's daughter; Ali's love-interest; an 18-year-old girl who houses the "Water" element. She always calms Ali and guides him through tricky situations. (2025–present)
- Barkha Bisht in dual roles as
  - Tanu Shergill: Tabu's twin sister; Jhanvi's mother; Kai's adoptive mother; the former power-holder of the "Earth" element. She hates Tabu owing to the latter getting more attention from her father. She plans to send Bela back to Besar. (2025–present)
  - Tabu Luthra: Tanu's twin sister; Bela's mother; the former power-holder of the "Earth" element. She left her family years ago and lives away from Panchgiri to keep her daughter unknown to its secrets. (2025–present)
- Urvashi Dholakia as DGP Aasma Mazhar: a Haryanvi police officer; Ali's mother; the former power-holder of the "Fire" element. She is a strict mother and wants Ali to learn controlling his powers. (2025–present)
- Pankaj Vishnupurikar as Kartik: a scientist; Baggu's father; the former powerholder of the "Water" element. (2025–present)
- Tanvi Gadkari as Jhanvi Shergill: Tanu's daughter; Kai's sister; an 18-year-old girl, who fakes being the power holder of the "Earth" element under her mother's influence but gets exposed. She is in a situationship with Ranveer but secretly wants to get into a relationship with him. She dislikes Bela as the latter being older than her, gets the powers. (2025–present)
- Yash Sehgal as Kai Shergill: Param's estranged son; Ranveer's half-brother; Jhanvi's adoptive brother; a 15-year-old boy, who houses the "Life" element. He gets upset of his mother's constant nagging. He bonds well with Bela and announces his homosexuality when she encourages her. (2025–present)
- Inder Bajwa as Param Deol: Ranveer's father; Kai's estranged father; a popular actor originally from Punjab, who shows careless approach towards Kartik's speculations. (2025–present)
- Omar Kandhari as Ahaan Sharma: Bela's best-friend (2025–present)
- Nikhat Khan as Sharmila: Tabu and Tanu's mother; Bela and Jhanvi's grandmother; Kai's adoptive grandmother; a generous lady who supports Bela in her tiff with Tanu (2025–present)
- Umesh Pherwani as Akshat Shergill: Tanu's husband; Jhanvi's father; Kai's adoptive father (2025–present)
- Shikha Singh as Payal Chauhan: a very rich woman who want to buy the High Crest University, and later joined Ahaan, Myra and Tanu; Kai's kidnapper (2025–present)

== Production ==
The series was announced on Disney+ Hotstar. The trailer of the series was released on 13 January 2025.

== Reception ==
Archika Khurana of The Times of India rated the series 3/5 stars and wrote “Power of Paanch is a decent attempt at exploring the supernatural mystery genre. With its talented cast and intriguing premise, it offers mild excitement and a refreshing departure from typical slice-of-life content.” Risha Ganguly of Times Now gave the show 3 stars.
