= Sssshhh... =

- Poster
- Directed by: Pavan S. Kaul
- Written by: Arshad Ali Syed
- Based on: Scream by Wes Craven
- Produced by: Sunil Mehta
- Starring: Dino Morea; Tanishaa; Kushal Punjabi; Gaurav Kapur; Suvarna Jha; Shivaji Satam; Simone Singh; Karan Nath
- Cinematography: Hiroo Keswani
- Edited by: Amit Saxena
- Music by: Songs: Anu Malik; Background Score: Salim–Sulaiman
- Distributed by: Cinevistaa Films
- Release date: 24 October 2003
- Running time: 163 minutes
- Country: India
- Language: Hindi

Sssshhh... is a 2003 Indian slasher film written and directed by Pavan S. Kaul. It stars Tanishaa (in her debut) and Dino Morea along with Kushal Punjabi, Gaurav Kapur, Suvarna Jha, Karan Nath, Shivaji Satam and Simone Singh. It was produced by Sunil Mehta and Prem Kishen, with the music directed by Anu Malik and background score by Salim-Sulaiman. It is a remake of the 1996 American film Scream.

== Plot ==
Late one night, Malini Gujral and her boyfriend Sunny are brutally murdered by a killer in a clown mask on their college campus.

Six months later, in Shimla, Malini's younger sister Mahek runs into police inspector Kamat Uncle. He tells her there is no progress in searching for her sister's killer, as no evidence was left behind. Mahek gets a call from the killer, which frightens her. The next day at college, she hangs out with her friends Rocky, Gehna, Rajat, Rhea, and Nikhil when she meets Suraj Rai, the man who returned her purse at the mall the other day. He is new to the campus from Delhi. It is obvious that Rocky is jealous and in love with Mahek. Over the course of the day, Mahek is stalked by the killer, who murders one of her teachers, Mrs. Roy.

There is a bloody shoe print at the crime scene, and inspectors believe it is the work of a serial killer. Rocky jokes about how he escaped having to take the psychology exam, and Kamat Uncle becomes suspicious, but Rocky's feet are bigger than the prints at the scene, eliminating him as a suspect. Suraj becomes nervous when his shoe size matches the footprint. Kamat Uncle suggests that they wait for the post-mortem report.

Mahek starts to avoid Rocky and apologizes to Suraj for his behavior. Suraj shares his close relationship with his father, and Mahek has flashbacks to when her dad left her family. She is comforted by her mom at home, who then leaves for an art convention in Delhi. Later that night, Mahek finds a window unlocked and realizes she's in the house with the killer. She notices an orange watch on the killer's wrist during the pursuit. She manages to alert Kamat Uncle and is able to fight the killer, who escapes before the police arrive. She runs outside, and Suraj is there. She notices the same orange watch on his wrist. Kamat Uncle arrives, and Suraj is arrested.

Mahek attends a party with Rocky but leaves early. On the foggy drive home, she receives a call from the killer. She is terrified because Suraj is supposed to be in jail. The killer appears on the road, causing Gehna to lose control of the car and crash into a river. Gehna is unconscious, and the killer tries to drown Mahek. Suraj arrives and fights the killer. It turns out he had an alibi. The killer escapes and is shot by Kamat Uncle. He jumps into the river, but the police are unsuccessful in recovering the killer's body.

Mahek makes amends with Suraj but continues to have visions of the killer. She has a breakdown, and her friends decide that they need to go on holiday. They go to an island and get trapped with the killer, who has followed them. They realise there is no escaping death now and argue over who cannot be trusted amongst them. Mahek is turned against Rocky as suspicious circumstances continue to surround him. Rajat, Rhea, and Nikhil are all murdered. Kamat Uncle and Rathod arrive on the island with news of Mahek's mother's death. Kamat Uncle is killed, and Suraj shoots the killer. When they remove the mask, it is Inspector Rathod. Rocky implores Mahek to accept his love, but Suraj shoots him.

Suraj reveals his identity as the killer. It is also revealed that Rajat was not killed but is alive. The killer is a duo. Heartbroken, Suraj and Rajat are brothers. Their mother was raped by Mahek and Malini's estranged father, destroying their family after she committed suicide from the shame. Following their mother's suicide, their dad shot himself. For revenge, Suraj and Rajat killed Mahek's father first, followed by Malini, then her mother, and needed to claim Mahek's life to repay the debt owed for her father ruining their lives.

Rocky shoots Suraj and Rajat, saving Mahek from the same fate as her family. Suraj dies at the hands of Mahek, who stabs him after his gunshot wound proves nonfatal. Rocky and Mahek ride back to the mainland on a boat in each other's arms.

== Cast ==
- Dino Morea as Rocky
- Tanishaa as Mehek Gujral
- Gaurav Kapur as Rajat Rai
- Kushal Punjabi as Nikhil
- Karan Nath as Suraj Rai
- Suvarna Jha as Gehna
- Tina Choudhary as Riya
- Alyy Khan as Inspector Akash Rathore
- Shivaji Satam as Commissioner Kamath
- Simone Singh as Malini Gujral
- Sambhavna Seth in an item number
- Kashmera Shah in an item number

== Production ==
Sssshhh... was the first feature-film production by Cinevistaas Limited. Filming took place at locations including Shimla, Kullu-Manali, Goa and Khandala in India, as well as Bangkok and Poda Island in Thailand. Director Pavan S. Kaul stated prior to the film's release that the entire second half was filmed in Thailand.

During filming in Manali, Tanishaa Mukerji, Dino Morea, Gaurav Kapur and Kaul were involved in a road accident after their vehicle skidded and overturned. Mukerji suffered a concussion and later said that she had no memory of several days surrounding the accident. She subsequently returned to filming and completed the production.

== Music ==
Sssshhh...

Soundtrack album by Anu Malik
- Released: 5 September 2003
- Genre: Feature film soundtrack
- Label: T-Series

No.	Title	Lyrics	Singer(s)	Length
1.	"Dheere Dheere Hua"	Praveen Bhardwaj	Alka Yagnik, Adnan Sami	6:33
2.	"Ishq Da Maara"	Dev Kohli	Sunidhi Chauhan, Sukhwinder Singh	7:09
3.	"Kab Mera Haal-E-Dil"	Rahat Indori	Sonu Nigam	5:16
4.	"Sapney"	Yogesh Gaur	Sonu Nigam, Alka Yagnik	7:50
5.	"Mohabbat Mein Ye"	Praveen Bhardwaj	Shaan	5:45
6.	"Tera Mera Dil"	Praveen Bhardwaj	Sonu Nigam, Alka Yagnik	7:02

== Release ==
Sssshhh... was released in India on 24 October 2003, during the Diwali period.

=== Home media ===
The film was released on Screambox on 3 February 2023 in United States.

=== Box office ===
The film was made on a budget of ₹3.5 crore. It earned ₹5.5 crore gross in India, with a worldwide gross of approximately ₹5.6 crore. Box Office India and Rediff.com classified the film as a "flop."

== Reception ==
Taran Adarsh from Bollywood Hungama gave the film 2 stars out of 5, feeling it was stylishly executed and had ample shock value, but was also weakly written and too lengthy. Sukanya Verma from Rediff.com criticized the acting performances except Morea, the focus on romance, and the background score.

Reviewing the film in 2022, Paul Lê from Bloody Disgusting noted the film's similarities with Scream as well as I Still Know What You Did Last Summer, feeling it still had a high amount of unpredictability, and while not as good as the original, the film was "a loud remake rich in regional charm and bold choices."
