= Tanmay Ssingh =

Indian actor

- Born: 18 September 1991 (age 35); Delhi, India
- Occupation: Film Actor

Tanmay Ssingh (born 18 September 1991) is an Indian actor in Bollywood films. Tanmay's debut film as lead actor was 'Sayonee (film)' which was produced by lucky Morani and Mohomed Morani and directed by Abhay Singhal & Nitin Kumar Gupta. This movie was inspired by the iconic 90s song 'Sayonee' sung by Pakistani Lahore’s sufi rock band Junoon. Tanmay will be soon feature in a signal Patthar Wargi of T series with Hina Khan and B Praak. Tanmay recently signed a three song video deal with the producer of Patthar Wargi.

== Film career ==
Tanmay Ssingh was born to Mukesh and Chitra Sachdeva. He was born and raised in New Delhi. After completing graduation he attended the Asmita theatre group in New Delhi.

Actor

Year	Film	Role	Other notes
2021	Sayonee	Lead Role	18 December 2020
2021	Patthar Wargi (Single)	Gangster	14 May 2021
