= Sabki Laadli Bebo =

- Written by: Anjana Sood; Farhan S; Vicky Chandra
- Directed by: Ravi Raj
- Starring: See Below
- Opening theme: "Mein Laadli, Laadli"
- Country of origin: India
- Original language: Hindi
- No. of episodes: 534

Production
- Producers: Anjana Sood; Vicky Chandra
- Running time: 24 minutes

Original release
- Network: StarPlus
- Release: 11 March 2009 – 25 March 2011

Sabki Laadli Bebo was a popular Indian drama television series that aired on STAR Plus. The series premiered on 11 March 2009 and was produced by Endemol India and Sachidanand Productions. It was concluded on 25 March 2011.

Sabki Laadli Bebo is all about a cute, cheerful, innocent girl Bebo, who is loved by her family immeasurably. This affluent, respectable, traditional Punjabi family of three brothers and their parents always yearned for a girl. Their happiness knew no bounds when, after years, God answered their prayers and a daughter was born.

== Plot ==
Sabki Laadli Bebo is the story of a family which yearns for a girl after having three boys. Kukku Narang (Kanwaljeet Singh) and his wife Amarjeet's prayers are finally answered and the family is blessed with Bebo, who gradually becomes everybody's laadli (favourite).

Bebo (Shivshakti Sachdev), a 16 years old woman, meets Amrit (Anuj Sachdeva) at a railway station. She assumes he is Shravan, the person whom her family have found as her suitor but later discovers that he isn't. On her wedding day, it is revealed that Bebo is an orphan who was adopted by the Narangs leading to the wedding being called off. Amrit consoles Bebo and they become friends. Amrit falls in love with Bebo. Karan, Simran's brother, also falls in love with Bebo. Simran blackmails Bebo and asks her to marry Karan. Bebo decides to marry Karan, while the whole family disapproves. The blackmail is discovered and her family instead gets her married to Amrit.

Amrit's sister-in-law Gursheel, makes her sister, Goldie the daughter-in-law of the Narangs by tricking them. Wanting the Narangs' property, Goldi accuses Amarjeet for a fire and Amro and Kuku are sent to jail. Bebo and Amrit uncover their truth. Goldie, Gursheel and Bablu are sent to jail and Amarjeet and Kuku, now proved innocent, return home.

Amrit gets a new job and at his set he meets a girl who looks exactly like Bebo - Rano, who falls in love with him. She stays with Bebo and her family and becomes jealous of Bebo and Amrit, so she makes herself look like Bebo and makes Bebo look like Rano. Rano tells Bebo to meet Rano's husband Tiwari on a cliff where she hits Bebo with an iron rod and pushes her off it. Bebo then recovers and starts living with Tiwari, and she has lost her memory completely. Tiwari's jealous wife tries to harm Bebo but she runs away where she sees Amrit and Rano marry. Amrit thinks she is Rano and so keeps her in his house. Rano gets irritated and worried, and so she tries to get her out the house but after so many attempts with her plans with Gursheel she fails to. Bebo finally regains her memory and plans to teach Rano a lesson. Rano kills Babul. Bebo films the murder and shows it to the police and proves that she is the real Bebo. Babul didn’t really die as it was his and Bebo’s plan to trap Rano and to prove that she is not Bebo. Rano then accepts and realises her mistakes and apologises to Bebo and the entire Narang family. The Narang family forgive Rano. Rano places Bebo hands onto Amrit’s hand and then leaves with her mother.

Bebo and Amrit are in an accident, and a new family kidnaps Bebo and lies to her that she is part of their family. Arjun Khanna, who lost his real wife, is pretending to be Bebo's husband. This family gives the entire authority of the Narang house to Goldie and Gursheel. Bebo's family is told that Bebo and Amrit are dead. Bebo tries to find out Amrit and she learns that Amrit was killed. She decides to stay back at the Khanna family and seek revenge for his death. Actually, Amrit is being held captive by Vijender, Arjun's brother. Discovering that her real family is being tortured, Bebo enters their home as Nimmo, a maid. She cures her mentally upset father and helps him to regain his memory. Meanwhile, Vijender convinces Amrit that Bebo cheated on him with Arjun and Amrit now wants to kill Arjun and Bebo.

On Amrit and Bebo's marriage anniversary, Bebo and her family plan to take their wealth back. It is revealed that Vijender killed Arjun's wife. Vijender, Kamini and Anchal are put in jail. Bebo goes back to her parents thinking that Amrit is dead. In a temple, Amrit follows Bebo to kill her. Bebo sees Amrit and takes him to her parents' house. Amrit still thinks that Bebo is cheating on him with Arjun. After a series of misunderstandings, Bebo and Arjun show Amrit the truth who then throws Gursheel and Goldie out of the house.

A mysterious girl (Manjeet) is in jail and calls Kuku Narang. He goes to the jail but does not know the girl - the girl gives a letter to Kuku, he reads it and then bails her out and takes her to live in their house. Kuku then revealed that she is his niece, in other words she is Kuku's younger brother's daughter. Manju falls in love with Amrit. Saru has a baby girl who is named Kanuk by Kuku. As Gursheel and Goldie stay at the women's hostel, Goldie decides that she doesn't want money but wants her family. Goldie goes to apologize to the family, who accept her on Kuku's request. Manjeet confesses her love for Amrit who says that he doesn't love her. While trying to shoot Bebo, the lights go out and Manjeet gets shot. Bebo is blamed for the murder, who then has to go to court. Eventually Gursheel turns a new leaf. The family develop a plan to find Manjeet's shooter by putting Manjeet in the hospital. The killer believes that she is alive and goes to kill her and is revealed to be Veer, who was her colleague and loved Manjeet and wanted to get revenge for mocking his love.

Nevertheless, the show ends on a happy note with all the family finally happy.

== Cast ==
- Shivshakti Sachdev as Bebo Amrit Malhotra and Rano

Kuku and Amro's daughter, Ashok, Daljeet and Omi's younger sister, Amrit's wife

- Anuj Sachdeva as Amrit Malhotra

Bebo's husband

- Kanwaljit Singh as Kuku Narang

Rajkumari's son, Pammi's elder brother, Amro's husband, Ashok, Daljeet, Omi and Bebo's father

- Shailley Kaushik as Amro Narang

Kuku's wife, Ashok, Daljeet, Omi and Bebo's mother

- Mohini Sharma as Rajkumari Narang

Kuku and Pammi's mother

- Vandana Sajnani as Pammi Narang

Rajkumari's daughter, Kuku's younger sister

- Pankaj Bhatia as Ashok Narang

Kuku and Amro's son, Daljeet, Omi and Bebo's elder brother, Saru's husband

- Madhuri Pandey as Saru Ashok Narang

Ashok's wife

- Vineet Kumar as Daljeet Narang

Kuku and Amro's son, Ashok's younger brother, Omi and Bebo's elder brother, Prabhjot's husband

- Nancy Johal as Prabhjot Narang

Daljeet's wife

- Siddharth Bajaj as Omi Narang

Kuku and Amro's son, Ashok and Daljeet's younger brother, Bebo's elder brother, Goldie's husband

- Anushree Bathla as Goldie Omi Narang

Gursheel's sister, Omi's wife

- Jayati Bhatia as Gursheel Malhotra

Goldie's sister, Amrit's sister in law

- Preet Kaur Madhan as Geet Malhotra

Amrit's sister

- Jatin Grewal as Arjun Khanna
- Hasan Zaidi as Karan Oberoi
- Yajuvendra Singh as Vijendra
- Iira Soni as Simran Kapoor / Simran Karan Oberoi
- Jasbir Jassi as Tiwari - Rano's husband
- Priyamvada Kant as Manjeet - Amrit’s Lover

== Production ==
A report stated the reason for the series to end that, "The production house decided to end the show as it was becoming increasingly difficult to meet the absurd demands of the leading couple — Shivshakti Sachdeva and Anuj Sachdeva of the show."
