= Komolika =

- Kasautii Zindagii Kay character
- First appearance: 22 November 2001
- Last appearance: 28 February 2008
- Created by: Ekta Kapoor; Balaji Telefilms
- Portrayed by: Urvashi Dholakia (2001–2008)

In-universe information
- Gender: Female
- Occupation: Business woman
- Family: Uma Majumdar (Mother); Ronit Majumdar (Uncle)
- Spouse: Anurag Basu (ex-husband)
- Children: 0
- Nationality: Indian

Komolika Majumdar is a fictional character from the Indian television series Kasautii Zindagii Kay, created by Ekta Kapoor. She is known for her glamorous style and malevolent schemes. The character has been portrayed by Urvashi Dholakia in the original series (2001–2008).

== Awards and recognition ==
=== Original series ===
Indian Telly Awards

- Best Actress in a Negative Role (2002, 2003, 2004, 2005, 2006, 2007, 2010)

Gold Awards

- Gold Award for Best Actress in a Negative Role (2007)

Golden Glory Awards

- Most Iconic TV Character (2022)

Indian Television Academy Awards

- Best Actress in Negative Role (2003, 2005, 2006, 2007, 2020)
- ITA Milestone Award (2020,2025)

== Legacy ==
As a fashion icon, Komolika's glamorous style has had a lasting impact on beauty and fashion trends in India. Her bold choices influenced viewers' perceptions of style, prompting a surge in interest in dramatic makeup and high-fashion outfits. Many fans continue to seek inspiration from her looks, demonstrating how a fictional character can shape real-world fashion.

Multifaceted Villainy

Unlike standard villains, Komolika was a complex character whose motivations were deeply rooted in themes of love and jealousy. This emotional depth made her relatable, allowing viewers to see her as more than just a typical antagonist.

Iconic Style

Komolika's bold makeup and stylish outfits established her as a fashion trendsetter, influencing the portrayal of vamps on Indian television. Many fans began to adopt her distinctive look, solidifying her status as a style icon.

Memorable Dialogues

Her character is renowned for striking lines and a dramatic delivery that enhanced her appeal, making her an unforgettable presence in the series. These memorable catchphrases contributed significantly to her character's legacy.

Cultural Impact

As a vamp, Komolika subverted traditional portrayals of women on Indian TV, often embodying a form of empowerment that was uniquely her own. Her character sparked important conversations about the complexities of female representation in media.

Soundtrack

Komolika's character BGM "Nikka" sang by Sunidhi Chauhan was a hit among Indian Television Watchers and till date has an impact on Social Media.
