= Suvarna Jha =

Indian television actress

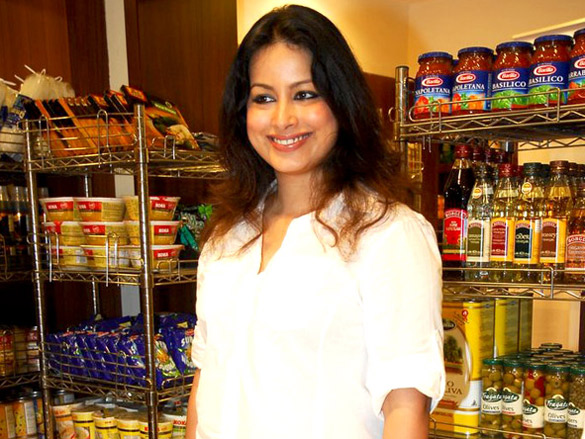
Suvarna Jha in 2010

Suvarna Jha is an Indian television actress who played Tripti Virani in Kyunki Saas Bhi Kabhi Bahu Thi. She did her schooling at Convent of Jesus and Mary, Waverley, Mussoorie.

== Career ==
Suvarna jha is widely known for her role as Tripti Virani in Star plus's cult classic- Kyunki Saas Bhi Kabhi Bahu thi (2000-2008). Her role as tripti is still fresh in viewers mind, with her dialogues from the serial getting viral all over social media. Prompting suvarna to return from london and enter the show again in 2026 after taking a break from acting from almost 16+years, in the show's second serial which is currently on air on star plus. Suvarna has also made prominent chatacterestic appearances in shows like kasamh se (2006–2009). Suvarna Jha played Gehna in the 2003 Bollywood movie Sssshhh.... Farah Khan, the daughter of the yesteryear Bollywood actor Sanjay Khan, offered her role in a show titled Jannat broadcast on DD Metro. She played the character of Zoya in that Muslim social drama. Soon after she was offered a role in Dekho Magar Pyaar Se, which was aired on Star Plus. She hosted Kaun Jeetega Bollywood Ka Ticket which aired on 9X. From 2005 to 2006, she played the role of Mishti Bose Mittal in Kaisa Ye Pyar Hai. From 2007 to 2008, she played the role of Karuna Makhija in Kasamh Se.

== Television ==
Year	Serial	Role	Channel
2001–2002	Jannat	Zoya	DD Metro; Star Plus
2002	Ssshhhh...Koi Hai – Meow!	Karishma Sharma (Episode 48)	Star Plus
2005–2006	Kaisa Ye Pyar Hai	Mishti Bose / Mishti Mittal	Sony Entertainment Television
2006–2008	Kyunki Saas Bhi Kabhi Bahu Thi	Tripti Rishabh Malhotra / Tripti Sahil Virani	Star Plus
2007–2008	Kasamh Se	Karuna Makhija	Zee TV
2026	Kyunki Saas Bhi Kabhi Bahu Thi 2	Tripti Subhash Dasgupta	Star Plus

=== Reality Show ===
Year	Show	Role	Channel
2008	Kaun Jeetega Bollywood Ka Ticket	Host	9X

=== Film ===
Year	Film	Role
2003	Sssshhh...	Gehna
