= Urvashi Dholakia =

Indian actress (born 1979)

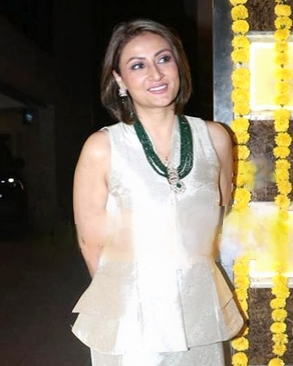
- Dholakia in 2025
- Born: 9 July 1979 (age 47); Delhi, India
- Occupation: Actress
- Years active: 1984–present
- Known for: Dekh Bhai Dekh; Kasautii Zindagii Kay; Kabhii Sautan Kabhii Sahelii; Bigg Boss 6
- Notable work: Kasautii Zindagii Kay; Bigg Boss 6
- Children: 2
- Awards: Full list

Urvashi Dholakia (pronounced [ˈʊɾʋəʃi d̪ʱoːˈlaːkɪjaː]; born 9 July 1979) is an Indian television actress. She is best known for her role of Komolika in the long running television series Kasautii Zindagii Kay, for which she won the Indian Telly Award for Best Actress in a Negative Role and the ITA Award for Best Actress in a Negative Role five times, and for winning the reality television show Bigg Boss 6.

== Early life ==
Dholakia was born on 9 July 1979 to a Gujarati mother and a Punjabi father.

Dholakia married at age 16 and had twin boys, Kshitij and Sagar, at age 17; she has raised them as a single mother.

== Career ==
=== Early career (1985–2000) ===
Dholakia made her acting debut at 6 in a TV commercial for Lux soap with Revathi. As a child she appeared as Rajlaxmi in the Doordarshan TV series Shrikant. Her first TV adult role was in Doordarshan's Dekh Bhai Dekh as Shilpa followed by Waqt Ki Raftar.

=== Widespread recognition (2000–2011) ===
The 2000s decade came as a golden period in bringing Dholakia to the top list of most popular actresses up until then, as she achieved a lot of universal acclaim and awards success for her performances in the Ekta Kapoor shows Ghar Ek Mandir, Kabhii Sautan Kabhii Sahelii, Kasautii Zindagii Kay and Kahiin To Hoga.

Among these, the character of Komolika in Kasautii Zindagii Kay (2001–2008), one of the longest running television series at that point, went on to be opined by many reviews as the most iconic villainess till date, winning her a number of recognitions. Since then, Dholakia and Kapoor have collaborated many times.

=== Bigg Boss and more (2013–2019) ===
In 2012, she participated in Colors TV's Bigg Boss 6 and on 12 January 2013, she emerged as the winner of the season. As of 2017, she is featured in Colors TV's historical fantasy series Chandrakanta as Queen Iravati.

=== Television comeback (2022–present) ===
Dholakia in 2022 again came back to fiction genre in Naagin 6 as Urvashi.

== Filmography ==
=== Television ===
Year	Serial	Role	Notes
1987	Shrikant	Rajlakshmi	
1993	Dekh Bhai Dekh	Shilpa	
1995	Zamana Badal Gaya	Anju Mathur	
1997	Waqt Ki Raftar		
2000–2001	Ghar Ek Mandir	Sonia	
2000-2002	Mehndi Tere Naam Ki	Pooja	
2001	Shaktimaan	Mansi Sharma	
2001-2002	Karam	Aditti	
2001–2002	Kabhii Sautan Kabhii Sahelii	Sonia	
2001	Des Mein Niklla Hoga Chand	Preet	
2001–2008	Kasautii Zindagii Kay	Komolika Majumdar	
2003	Tum Bin Jaaoon Kahaan	Shweta	
2003	Kahani Terrii Merrii	Kajol	
2003–2007	Kahiin To Hoga	Archana "Archie" Khanna	
2008–2009	Comedy Circus	Contestant	
2009	Sacch Ka Saamna	Guest	
2009–2010	Bayttaab Dil Kee Tamanna Hai	Karishma Mehra	
2010	Meethi Choori No 1	Contestant	
2012	Dil Se Di Dua... Saubhagyavati Bhava?	Dr. Komolika Rana	
2012–2013	Bigg Boss 6	Contestant	Winner
2014	Bigg Boss 8	Guest	
2015	Badi Door Se Aaye Hai	555	
2017–2018	Chandrakanta	Queen Iravati Singh	
2018	Juzzbaat	Guest	
2019	Ishq Mein Marjawan	Mohini	
2019	Tu Aashiqui	Mohini	
2019	Kitchen Champion 5	Guest	
2019	Nach Baliye 9	Contestant	8th place
2020	Bigg Boss 13	Guest	
2022	Bigg Boss 15	Guest	
2022-2023	Naagin 6	Urvashi Kataria	
2023-2024; 2025	Pushpa Impossible	Devi Singh Shekhawat	
2023	Jhalak Dikhhla Jaa 11	Contestant	16th place
2025	Power of Paanch	DGP Aasma Mazhar	
2026	The 50	Contestant	Semi Finalist
2026 –	Maa Hai Na	Contestant	

=== Films ===
Year	Movie	Role	Language
1986	Babul	Rani "Rannu" / Nandini "Nannu" Singh	Hindi
1988	Kab Tak Chup Rahungi	Laxmi	Hindi
1991	Izzat	Anu	Hindi
2006	Swapnam	Yamini/Komolika	Malayalam/Hindi

== See also ==
- List of Indian television actresses
