= Afsar Bitiya =

2011 Indian TV series

- Created by: Rakesh Paswan
- Written by: Rakesh Paswan, Kamlesh Kunti Singh, Anshumali Jha, Komal Garg, Tuhin Sinha, Sandeep Nath, Amit Jha, Rekha Babal Madhu Bastola & Vandana Tiwary
- Directed by: Arvind Babbal, Prabhat Prabhakar, K.K.Chauhan, Ajay Veermal, Sandeep Vijay, Anand Kumar & Gurpreet Rana
- Creative director: Neha Kothari
- Starring: Mitali Nag; Kinshuk Mahajan; Shahbaz Khan; Shivshakti Sachdev; Monica Khanna; Virendra Saxena; Tanya Sharma; Neha Prajapati
- Theme music composer: Dony Hazarika
- Opening theme: Afsar Bitiya
- Country of origin: India
- Original language: Hindi
- No. of seasons: 1
- No. of episodes: 268

Production
- Producer: Raakesh Paswan
- Production locations: Bhagalpur, Bihar
- Cinematography: Shabbir Naik & Munaf Naik
- Production company: Village Boy Production Pvt. Ltd.

Original release
- Network: Zee TV
- Release: 19 December 2011 – 28 December 2012

Afsar Bitiya (international title: Krishi) is an Indian soap opera, which was broadcast on the channel Zee TV from 19 December 2011 to 28 December 2012. With it set in Bhagalpur, Bihar, it is the story of Krishna, who rises from modest beginnings to a successful career. The show was further dubbed into English and then aired on Zee World, targeting international audience.

== Plot summary ==
Krishna, who is the protagonist of the story, comes from a very poor family. Yet she dreams of becoming a BDO (Block Development Officer). She constantly struggles with money, jealous relatives and her dark skin being mocked. Her dad and the landlord's sons, Babloo and Pintu, secretly help her study and even kidnap her to sit for the tough exams while her uncle bribes to push his own daughter Pinky instead.

After endless drama—family fights, a near-forced marriage, false accusations, and Pintu getting trapped into marrying Pinky—Krishna nails the tests, exposes the cheating, and finally becomes BDO. She marries Pintu, faces more corruption and tragedy (including losing loved ones), but stays strong, turns down bigger dreams to save her family, and gives birth to a baby girl. In the end, even Pinky softens up, and everyone's happy.

== Cast ==
=== Main cast ===
→ Mitali Nag as Krishna Raj/ Krishna Pintu Singh

→ Kinshuk Mahajan as Pintu Singh

=== Recurring cast ===
→ Virendra Saxena as Vidyapati Raj, Krishna's father

→ Shahbaz Khan as Tuntun Singh, Pintu's father

→ Yash Sinha as Babloo Singh, Pintu's elder brother

→ Shivshakti Sachdev as Priyanka "Pinky" Raj, Dehati & Bihari's daughter, Krishna's cousin

→ Monica Khanna as Swati Raj, Krishna's second elder sister

→ Mukesh Tripathi as Mahesh, Swati's Husband

→ Tanya Sharma as Chanchal Raj, Krishna's younger sister

→ Meena Mir as Saraswati Vidyapati Raj, Krishna's mother

→ Prachee Pathak as Dehati Bihari Raj, Krishna's aunt-in-law, Bihari's wife

→ Neeraj Sood as Bihari Raj, Krishna's uncle, Vidyapati's younger brother

→ Indira Krishnan as Ganga Devi/ Ganga Tuntun Singh, Pintu's mother

→ Neha Prajapati as Manisha Raj, Krishna's elder sister

→ Ashwini Kalsekar as Sikka Thakurain

→ Soni Sharma as Anchor

== Development ==
My sister is a BDO in Jharkhand. I have seen how hard she worked to get through her exams and I have always encouraged her to pursue her education and career. I remember I had arranged to send her to Delhi for special classes for the exam. Finally, when she got through, the whole family atmosphere had changed. I could feel the immense joy and pride in my parents. That made me think and I began to explore how best I can narrate this story on television: a story of hard work, the importance of education and how success comes only after hard work. Thus, Afsar Bitiya was conceptualized.

— Producer Rakesh Paswan

== Reception ==
=== Critics ===
The Indian Express rated three stars and stated it as a must watch series.

=== Ratings ===
The series opened with a rating of 1.9 TVR. As in February 2012, it garnered 1.7 TVR. As in July 2012, it garnered a low ratings ranging 0.8 and 0.9 TVR. The series ended with 2 TVR.
