= Sriti Jha =

Indian actress (born 1986)

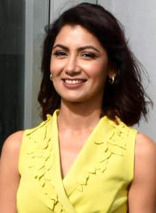
- Jha in 2022
- Born: 26 February 1986 (age 40); Begusarai, Bihar, India
- Education: Sri Venkateswara College, University of Delhi
- Occupation: Actress
- Years active: 2007–present
- Notable work: Dil Se Di Dua... Saubhagyavati Bhava? Balika Vadhu; Kumkum Bhagya

Signature
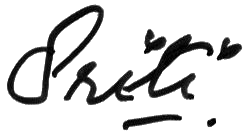

Sriti Jha (pronounced [ˈsɾɪt̪i d͡ʒʱaː]; born 26 February 1986) is an Indian actress who primarily works in Hindi television. Noted for her versatility in a range of genres, Jha is a recipient of several accolades including two ITA Awards, three Indian Telly Awards and two Gold Awards.

Jha made her acting debut in 2007 with the teen drama, Dhoom Machaao Dhoom, playing Malini Sharma. Jha then established herself as a leading actress with her portrayal of Sudha "Devika" Sharma Vashisht in Jyoti, Sandhya Savratkar Pradhan in Rakt Sambandh and Jhanvi Dobriyal / Sia Pratapsingh in Dil Se Di Dua... Saubhagyavati Bhava?. Jha earned wider recognition with her portrayal of Pragya Arora Mehra in Kumkum Bhagya. In 2022, she participated in Fear Factor: Khatron Ke Khiladi 12, where she finished at 10th place and became the 3rd runner-up in Jhalak Dikhhla Jaa 10.

== Early life and education ==
Jha was born on 26 February 1986 in Begusarai, Bihar. She went to live with her family in Kolkata, where they stayed for 10 years, then moved to Kathmandu, Nepal. They then moved to New Delhi, where she continued her studies at Laxman Public School. She completed her Bachelor of Arts degree in English at Sri Venkateswara College, New Delhi. She has an elder sister, Meenakshi and a younger brother, Shashank.

== Career ==
=== Debut and early breakthrough (2007-2013) ===
Jha made her acting debut in 2007 playing Malini Sharma in Disney India's teen drama Dhoom Machaao Dhoom. In 2008, she played Sunaina Kotak opposite Saurabh Pandey in Jiya Jale and also participated in the friend-based reality show Kaho Na Yaar Hai. Jha played Suhani, a royal princess in Shaurya Aur Suhani, opposite Saurabh Pandey, in 2009.

Jha's first major role was in Jyoti, where she played Sudha Sharma, a split personality patient opposite Alok Narula, from 2009 to 2010. In 2010, Jha played a visually impaired girl, Sandhya Savratkar Pradhan opposite Naman Shaw and Dhruv Bhandari in Rakt Sambandh. Critic from The Indian Express noted, "Sriti is well cast as she brings a certain vulnerability and quiet strength to her character." In that year, she appeared as a contestant on Nachle Ve with Saroj Khan and Meethi Choori No 1.

From 2011 to 2013, Jha portrayed Jhanvi Sharma Dobriyal / Sia Sharma Pratapsingh, a victim of domestic violence in Dil Se Di Dua... Saubhagyavati Bhava?, opposite Harshad Chopda and Karanvir Bohra. The show proved to be her breakthrough and earned her recognition. In 2013, Jha also played Ganga Singh opposite Shashank Vyas in Balika Vadhu.

=== Established actress (2014-2022) ===
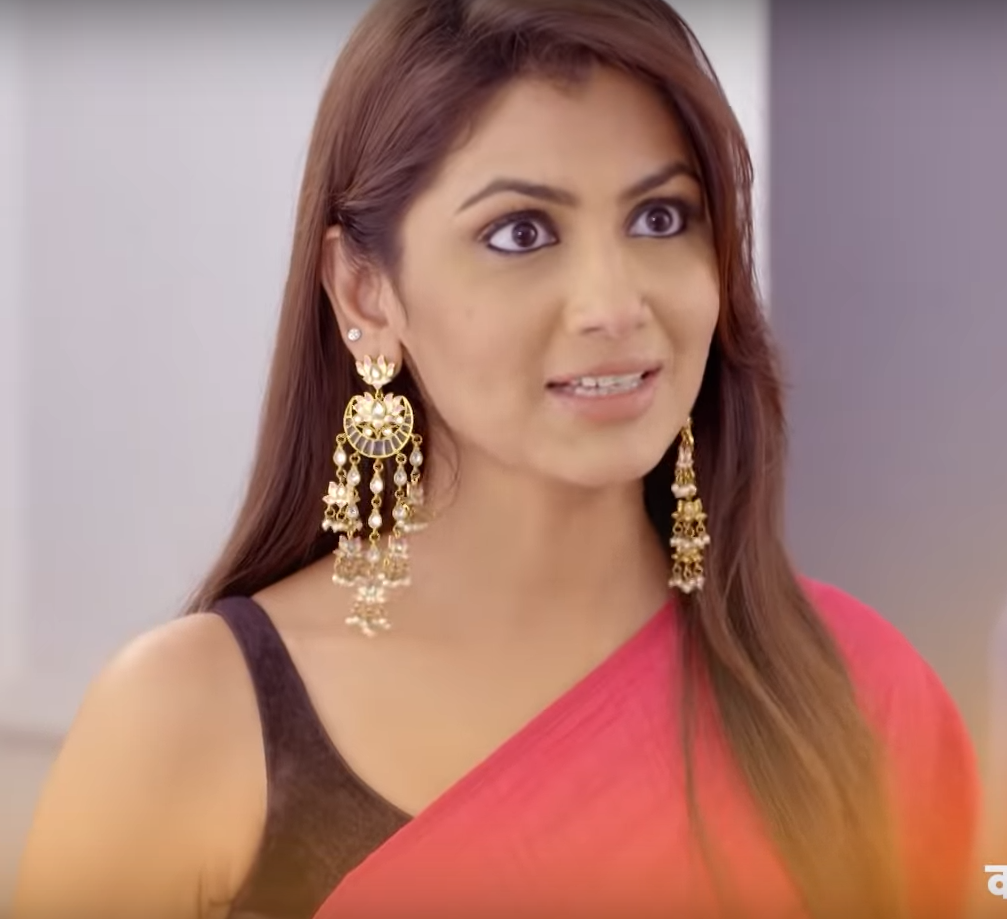
Jha in a scene of Kumkum Bhagya

From 2014 to 2021, Jha portrayed Pragya Arora Mehra in Ekta Kapoor's Kumkum Bhagya opposite Shabir Ahluwalia. The series earned her critical acclaim, success and established her among the leading actresses of Indian television. Her portrayal of Pragya earned her various accolades including ITA Award for Best Actress - Drama and Indian Telly Award for Best Actress in a Lead Role.

Alongside her role in Kumkum Bhagya, Jha acted as the narrator for Naagin 2 in 2016. She also played Deepa in the 2020 short film U-Turn and in 2021, she played Sakshi Deewan in the podcast series Darmiyaan.

In 2022, Jha first participated in Fear Factor: Khatron Ke Khiladi 12 and ended up finishing at the 10th place. In the same year, she participated in Jhalak Dikhhla Jaa 10, as a wildcard entry and finished as the 3rd runner-up.

=== Recent work (2023-present) ===
In 2023, Jha played Jaya, an actress in Karan Johar's Rocky Aur Rani Kii Prem Kahaani. In the same year, she appeared as the ghost of Jhanvi / Sia in Saubhagyavati Bhava: * Niyam Aur Shartein Laagu, a sequel to her 2011 series. She played a working wife in the short film Chawal, alongside Nihal Parashar, in the same year.

From November 2023 to May 2025, Jha is seen playing Amruta Bhavani Chitnis, a banker opposite Arjit Taneja in Kaise Mujhe Tum Mil Gaye.

== Other work and public image ==
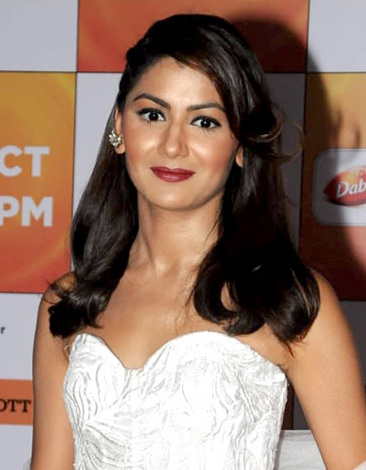
Jha at an event in 2018

Jha's acting performances in the series - Jyoti, Rakt Sambandh, Dil Se Di Dua... Saubhagyavati Bhava? and Kumkum Bhagya, established her among the leading and highest-paid actresses of the Hindi television. Jha is widely known for her style and fashion sense.

For her performance as Pragya in Kumkum Bhagya, The Indian Express placed her at fifth position in its "Top 10 television actresses" list of 2017. The Times of India noted Jha's different portrayals and appearances mainly in female-led shows and roles. Jha and Shabir Ahluwalia's pair was named among the "Best jodis of television" in 2014. Jha is a celebrity endorser for brands including, Accessorize India, Belleza, and Kalki Fashion and Nupur Henna. In 2020, Jha became a part of a fundraiser for people affected by the COVID-19 pandemic. In 2023, Jha along with the cast of Kaise Mujhe Tum Mil Gaye and Kumkum Bhagya, celebrated Christmas with SNEHA foundation.

In addition to her acting career, Jha also recite poems and does live shows. In January 2021, Jha recited a poem, "Confessions Of An Asexual Romantic", during the 2020 Kommune India Spoken Fest, in which she spoke about how the life of an asexual might be and how there is a lack of freedom in India when it comes to talking about one's sexuality. In an interview, she clarified she is not an asexual and that the poem isn't about her. She also recited two more poems regarding people with different sexual preferences and the problems they face such as "Choodiyaan" which talks about a gay male, and "Chaabi Gum Gai Hai", based on a lesbian female. In "It's Pehla Pyaar Every Time", she talks about how every time we fall in love, it feels as if it's the first time.

Her other works, such as "To Like? Or To Love?" differentiate between loving and liking and how liking is free of boundaries while love is limiting. Jha's first open letter "A Letter To Myself" is about what she wants to tell her 15-year-old self in the past and that we should never compromise under any circumstance. In this collaboration with ITC Vivel, Jha inspires women to uncondition, challenge stereotypes and go forth to fulfill their dreams with confidence and say out loud, "Ab Samjhauta Nahin". She also presented a poem "Cheesy Stupid Ishq", as a narrator a day before the Valentines Day in 2021.

== Filmography ==
=== Films ===
Year	Title	Role	Notes	Ref.
2020	U-Turn	Deepa	Short film	
2023	Rocky Aur Rani Kii Prem Kahaani	Jaya	Cameo	
2023	Chawal	Wife	Short film	

=== Television ===
Year	Title	Role	Notes	Ref.
2007–2008	Dhoom Machaao Dhoom	Malini Sharma	Supporting role	
2008	Jiya Jale	Sunaina Kotak	Main role	
2008	Kaho Na Yaar Hai	Contestant		
2009	Shaurya Aur Suhani	Princess Suhani	Main role	
2009–2010	Jyoti	Sudha "Devika" Sharma Vashisht	Supporting role	
2010	Rakt Sambandh	Sandhya Savratkar Pradhan	Main role	
2010	Nachle Ve with Saroj Khan	Contestant		
2010	Meethi Choori No 1	Contestant		
2010	Rahul Dulhaniya Le Jayega	Herself		
2011–2013	Dil Se Di Dua... Saubhagyavati Bhava?	Jhanvi Dobriyal / Sia Pratap Singh	Main role	
2013	Balika Vadhu	Ganga Singh	Supporting role	
2014–2021	Kumkum Bhagya	Pragya Arora Mehra	Main role	
2015	Nach Baliye 7	Herself	Guest appearance	
2015	Bad Company	Herself		
2016	Naagin 2	Narrator		
2016	Women Empowerment Awards	Host		
2021	Darmiyaan	Sakshi Deewan		
2022	Fear Factor: Khatron Ke Khiladi 12	Contestant	10th place	
2022	Jhalak Dikhhla Jaa 10	Contestant	4th place	
2023	Saubhagyavati Bhava: * Niyam Aur Shartein Laagu	Jhanvi / Sia	Special appearance	
2023–2025	Kaise Mujhe Tum Mil Gaye	Amruta Bhavani Chitnis	Main role	
2026–present	Oh Humnava Tum Dena Saath Mera	Aparajita "Appu" Sharma Bharadwaj	Main role	

== Accolades ==
Year	Award	Category	Work	Result	Ref.
2014	Gold Awards	Best Actress in a Lead Role	Kumkum Bhagya	Nominated	
2014	Indian Television Academy Awards	Best Actress - Popular	Kumkum Bhagya	Nominated	
2014	Indian Television Academy Awards	Best Actress - Drama	Kumkum Bhagya	Nominated	
2015	Indian Television Academy Awards	Best Actress - Popular	Kumkum Bhagya	Nominated	
2015	Indian Television Academy Awards	Gr8! On-Screen Couple (with Shabir Ahluwalia)	Kumkum Bhagya	Won	
2015	Indian Telly Awards	Best Actress in a Lead Role	Kumkum Bhagya	Won	
2015	Indian Telly Awards	Best Onscreen Couple (with Shabir Ahluwalia)	Kumkum Bhagya	Won	
2015	Producers Guild Film Awards	Best Actress in a Drama Series	Kumkum Bhagya	Nominated	
2016	Gold Awards	Face of the Year	Kumkum Bhagya	Won	
2016	Gold Awards	Best Actress in a Lead Role	Kumkum Bhagya	Nominated	
2016	Indian Television Academy Awards	Best Actress - Popular	Kumkum Bhagya	Nominated	
2017	Indian Television Academy Awards	Best Actress - Popular	Kumkum Bhagya	Nominated	
2017	Indian Television Academy Awards	Best Actress - Drama	Kumkum Bhagya	Nominated	
2018	Gold Awards	Best Actress in Lead Role	Kumkum Bhagya	Won	
2018	Gold Awards	Best Onscreen Jodi (with Shabir Ahluwalia)	Kumkum Bhagya	Nominated	
2018	Indian Television Academy Awards	Best Actress - Popular	Kumkum Bhagya	Nominated	
2018	Indian Television Academy Awards	Best Actress - Drama	Kumkum Bhagya	Nominated	
2019	Indian Telly Awards	Best Actress in a Lead Role	Kumkum Bhagya	Nominated	
2019	Indian Telly Awards	Best Onscreen Couple (with Shabir Ahluwalia)	Kumkum Bhagya	Nominated	
2019	Gold Awards	Best Actress in a Lead Role	Kumkum Bhagya	Nominated	
2019	Indian Television Academy Awards	Best Actress - Drama	Kumkum Bhagya	Won	
2025	Indian Telly Awards	Best Actress in a Lead Role	Kaise Mujhe Tum Mil Gaye	Nominated	
2025	Indian Telly Awards	Fan Favorite Actress	Kaise Mujhe Tum Mil Gaye	Nominated	
2025	Indian Telly Awards	Fan Favorite Jodi (with Arjit Taneja)	Kaise Mujhe Tum Mil Gaye	Nominated	
2025	Indian Telly Awards	Fan Favorite Star - Zee TV	Kaise Mujhe Tum Mil Gaye	Won	
2025	Indian Telly Awards	Best Television Personality of the Year	—N/a	Nominated	

== See also ==
- List of Hindi television actresses
- List of Indian television actresses
