= Mahendra Bohra =

Indian producer (1946–2026)

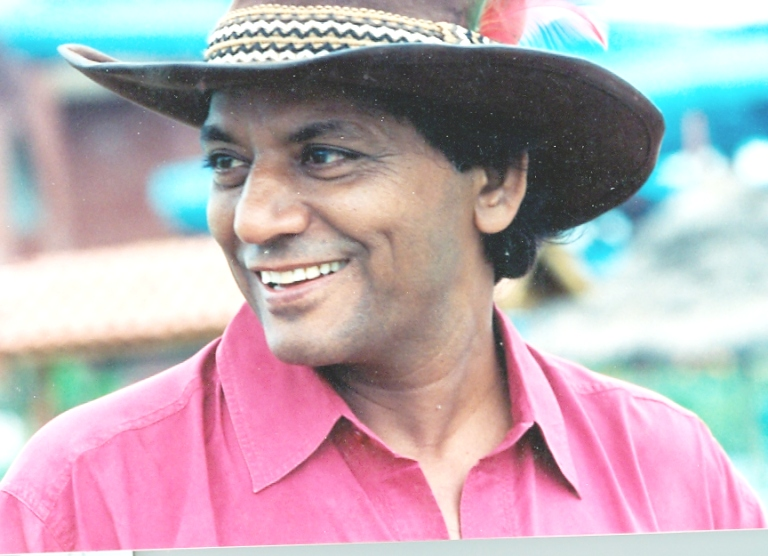
Bohra on the sets of Takkar

Mahendra Ramkumar Bohra (3 July 1946 – 2 March 2026) was an Indian Bollywood producer.

== Early life ==
Bohra was born in Jodhpur, Rajputana (now Rajasthan) on 2 July 1946, into a Marwari family. He was the son of popular filmmaker Ramkuma Bohra. He had a daughter Meenakshi and a son Karanvir.

== Death ==
Bohra died on 2 March 2026, at the age of 79. His son, actor Karanvir Bohra, shared the news of his father's death in a social media post.

== Filmography ==
Year	Film
1975	Saraswati Lakshmi Parvati
1990	Tejaa
1992	Veera Velo Aavje
1995	Takkar
2019	Hume Tumse Pyaar Kitna
2022	My Pink Shoes
2023	Gopala
