= Saurabh Prajapati =

Indian choreographer

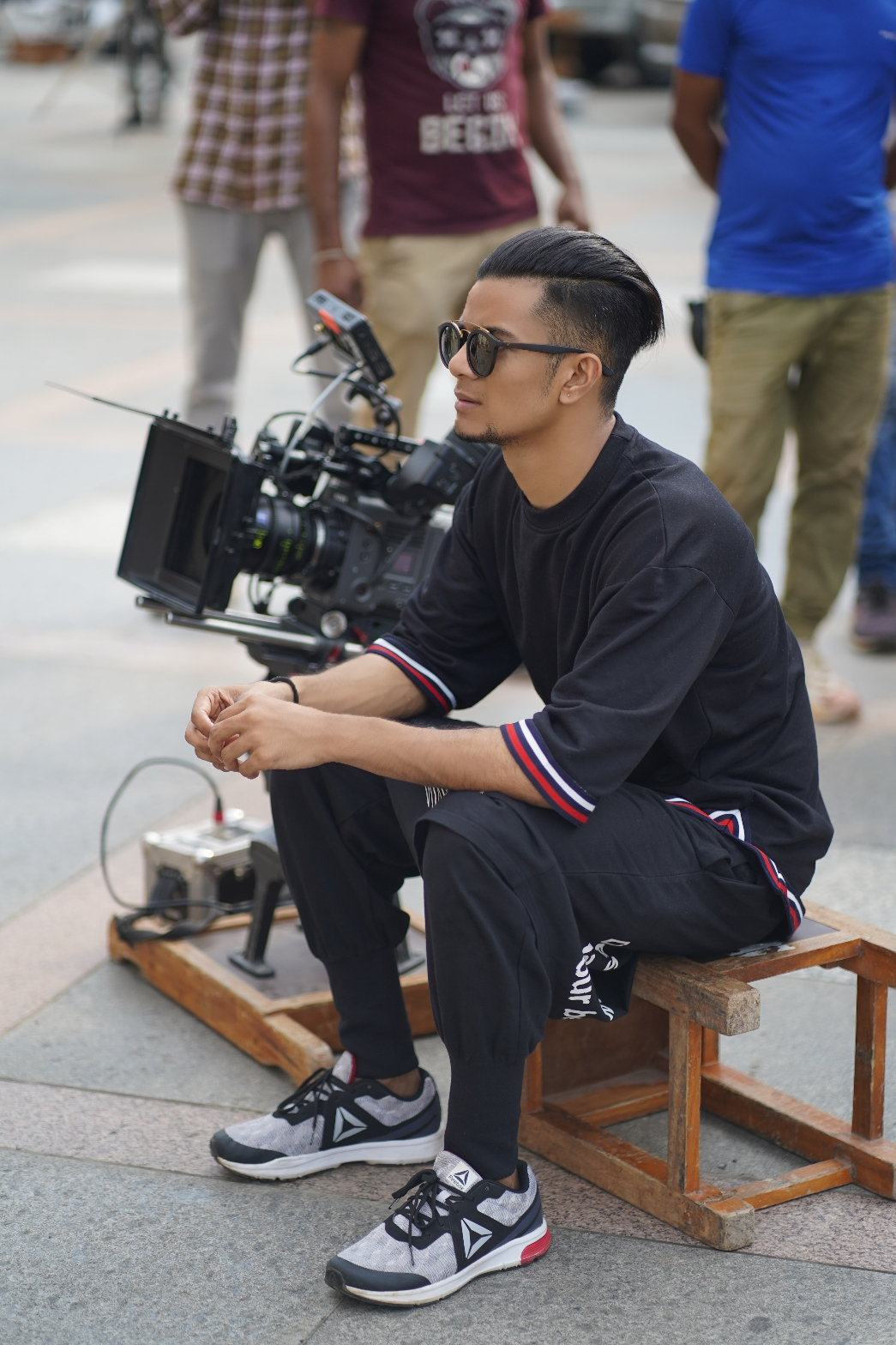
- Born: Saurabh Prajapati; 24 March 1999 (age 27); Uttar Pradesh
- Education: Graduation in dance and Diploma in Dance Foundation
- Occupations: Artistic director; choreographer
- Television: The Kapil Sharma Show, India's Best Dancer

Saurabh Prajapati (born 24 March 1999) is an Indian choreographer, dancer and artistic director. He is widely known for his performance and direction of the "Fidaai" music video starring Elli AvrRam and Salman Yusuff Khan.

== Early life ==
Saurabh Prajapati was raised in Uttar Pradesh, India. His journey began when he discovered his talent at 8 years old, leading him to attend dance classes in Uttar Pradesh. He pursued his education in dance and a Diploma in Dance Foundation, being trained nationally and international at institutions like Terence Lewis' Professional Training Institute.

== Career ==
Saurabh is a choreographer in several Bollywood films and music videos. He has also choreographed alongside multiple well-known artists for stage shows, feature films and music videos. Saurabh is currently holding the title of the "Youngest Dance Choreographer and Director" in India with performances and appearance on various successful films and music videos.

In 2019, he appeared as a judge on Electric Heels, a group dance competition by IIT Guwahati. He has later appeared on several dance live shows as a guest.

In 2021, he directed and choreographed the music video "Fidaai" starring Elli AvrRam and Salman Yusuff Khan, which was later supported by Aamir Khan for his work. He also starred as a choreographer alongside Yo Yo Honey Singh and Lulia Vantur for the music video and promotional videos of "Yai Re".

In 2022, he worked with the rapper Badshah on curating and choreographing the Paagal Tour across India.

He has also directed promotional videos for Jio IPL T20 and Domino's Pizza.

In 2022, he directed the video of the song "Aao Naa", sung by Vishal Mishra, featuring with Terence Lewis.

During The Kapil Sharma Show S1 (E168), on the "choreographers special show" featuring Geeta Kapoor, Ganesh Acharya and Terence Lewis as guests, Saurabh appeared in the episode directing Tenu Meri Umar Lag Jaave, during its promotion, including many other television live shows.

He also appeared in the finale of India's Best Dancer for the live performance of Tenu Meri Umar Lag Jaave, which was also directed by him.

== Projects ==
=== Projects Directed by Saurabh Prajapati ===
| No. | Year | Title of Work |
|---|---|---|
| 1 | 2020 | Tu Hai Toh |
| 2 | 2020 | Tenu Meri Umar Lag Jaave |
| 3 | 2020 | Palaash Muchhal Feat. Amit Mishra: Ab Kya Jaan Legi Meri |
| 4 | 2020 | Tenu Meri Umar Lag Jaave |
| 5 | 2021 | Fidaai (ft. Elli AvrRam, Salman Yusuff Khan) |
| 6 | 2022 | Shaidayee |
| 7 | 2022 | Bharosa (ft. Vishal Mishra, Nishawn Bhullar, Kaushal Kishore, Saurabh P) |
| 8 | 2022 | Khuda Badal Diya (ft. Surbhi Jyoti | Rohit Khandelwal, Sumit B, Bhanu P, Saurabh P) |
| 9 | 2022 | Directed & Choreographed Dhavni Bhanushali Live Tour Shows |
| 10 | 2022 | Aao Naa (ft. Vishal Mishra, Kaushal Kishore) |
| 11 | 2022 | Chandni (ft. Vishal Mishra) (VYRL Originals) |
| 12 | 2022 | Badshaah Paagal Tour |

=== Projects choreographed by Saurabh Prajapati ===
| Year | Title of Work |
|---|---|
| 2019 | Arjun Kanungo (ft. Hona Chaida) |
| 2020 | Kandhe Ka Who Til (ft. Sachet Tandon) |
| 2020 | Palaash Muchhal (Ft. Amit Mishra: Ab Kya Jaan Legi Meri) |
| 2021 | Soulmate (ft. Akull, Aastha Gill, Shivaleeka Oberoi, Mellow D, Dhruv Y |
| 2022 | Shonk Se |
| 2022 | Dhokebaaz (ft. Jaani l Afsana Khan l Vivek Anand Oberoi, Trindha Choudhury) (VYRL Originals) |
| 2022 | Runjhun Barsaatien Aayi Hai (ft. Vishal Mishra, Hina Khan & Shaheer S l Rashmi Virag l Raj Jaiswal) |
| 2022 | Laal Mehendiyaan (ft. Akull) |
| 2022 | Aao Naa (ft. Vishal Mishra) |
| 2022 | Nazneen (ft. Uchana Amit, Sonarika Bhadoria) |
| 2022 | Badshaah Paagal Tour |
| 2022 | Yai Re (ft. Yo Yo Honey Singh, Lulia Vantur) |
| 2022 | Film Banda Singh with Arshad Warsi and Meher Vij |
| 2023 | Been (ft. Kaka WRLD, Pranjal Dahiya, Renuka Panwar, Jaani, Avvy Sra, B2gether Pros) |
| 2023 | Kyun (ft. Aastha Gill) |
| 2023 | Kut Kut Bajra (ft. Neha Bhasin) |
| 2023 | Ashk (ft. Yo Yo Honey Singh, Tahmina Arsalan) |
