= Tapeshwari Sharma =

Indian television actress

- Born: Odisha, India
- Other names: Tashi
- Education: Bachelor of Commerce from Symbiosis International University; Diploma in Human resource management from NMIMS
- Occupation: Actress, D.J.
- Years active: 2007 - Present
- Known for: Sasural Genda Phool; Jiya Jale
- Spouse: Vishal Grewal
- Children: Viraj Grewal

Tapeshwari Sharma is an Indian television actress born in Odisha, India. She started her career with her first show Kasauti Zindagi Ki in 2007, When she was doing management course in NMIMS, Mumbai (2007) After that she got a parallel lead role in a show called Jiya Jale as Sujata Kotak on 9X (TV channel) with Sriti Jha (2007). after that she worked in various Hindi daily soaps. But she is mostly famous for the show Sasural Genda Phool Sanjana Bajpai, Suhana's sister, Kamal Kishore's youngest daughter, Deepak's wife (in the last episode) (2010–12). She is 39 years old.

== Filmography ==
Year	Title	Role	Notes	Reference
2007	Jiya Jale	Sujata Kotak		
2008	Jaane Kya Baat Hui	Shweta Tiwari		
2008	Hum Ladkiyan	Pooja	Lead Role	
2010–2012	Sasural Genda Phool	Sanjana Bajpayee		
2011	Nachle Ve with Saroj Khan	Contestant	Finalist	
2012	Parichay — Nayee Zindagi Kay Sapno Ka	Anokhi Gaurav Chopra		
2013	Chhanchhan	Sonali		
2013	Madhubala – Ek Ishq Ek Junoon	-	Opposite Vivian Dsena	
2014	Devon Ke Dev...Mahadev	Usha/Behula		

== Awards ==
Year	Award	Category	Serial	Outcome
2012	People's Choice Awards India	Favourite Ensemble Cast	Parichay	Nominated
