= Tere Mere Sapne =

Tere Mere Sapne (transl. Our Dreams) may refer to these in Indian entertainment:

- "Tere Mere Sapne" or "Tere Mere Sapne Ab Ek Rang Hai", a song from the 1965 Hindi film Guide
- Tere Mere Sapne (1971 film), a Hindi film directed by Vijay Anand
- Tere Mere Sapne (1996 film), a Hindi film produced by Amitabh Bachchan
- Tere Mere Sapne (TV series), an Indian drama-series, 2009–2011
