= Dil Se Di Dua... Saubhagyavati Bhava? =

Indian social drama television series

- Also known as: Jhanvi Ki Kahani
- Genre: Psychological thriller
- Inspired by: Sleeping With The Enemy
- Written by: Anshuman Sinha; Bijesh Jayarajan; Anil Nagpal
- Directed by: Santosh Kohle; Prasad Govandi; Ismail umar khan
- Starring: Karanvir Bohra; Sriti Jha; Harshad Chopda
- Theme music composer: Rajiv Bhatt
- Opening theme: Hume Tumse Pyaar Kitna
- Country of origin: India
- Original language: Hindi
- No. of seasons: 1
- No. of episodes: 326

Production
- Executive producers: Vishal Vivek; Taruni Mathur
- Producers: Vikas Seth; Mahesh Pandey
- Cinematography: Ashok Salian; Raju Gulai
- Editor: Sachin Shinde
- Running time: 22 minutes
- Production companies: UTV Software Communications; Trishula Productions

Original release
- Network: Life OK
- Release: 18 December 2011 – 18 January 2013

Related
- Saubhagyavati Bhava: * Niyam Aur Shartein Laagu

Dil Se Di Dua... Saubhagyavati Bhava? (transl. Heartfelt Prayers... May You Be Fortunate?) is an Indian Hindi-language psychological thriller television series. Produced by UTV Software Communications and Trishula Productions, it aired on Life OK (later rebranded as Star Bharat) from December 2011 to January 2013. It starred Sriti Jha, Harshad Chopda and Karanvir Bohra. The series was inspired from 1991 American film, Sleeping with the Enemy.

== Plot ==
Viraj Dobriyal, a dashing, wealthy and powerful businessman is married to an educated and simple middle class girl, named Jhanvi Sharma. Gradually, she discovers that, he is over possessive and abusive, when she faces domestic abuse. On their wedding night, he drinks milk after drowning a cockroach in it.

Viraj, who had an abusive childhood, is irrationally dominating, he has been diagnosed with OCD, well being sweet, polite and nice in front of people. Viraj sees Jhanvi with Sanjay one day when she went shopping to buy a gift for Viraj. Sanjay drops Jhanvi home. Meanwhile, Viraj sees Sanjay holding her hand. Jhanvi decorates the house, with candles and flowers and makes a cake for Viraj. When Viraj comes home, angry at her for being, with Sanjay, he beats her up and rapes her. Jhanvi decides to tell her family about Viraj, but her father gets framed for theft, which is actually planned, by Viraj. With the help of his connections in the Indian Police Service, Viraj arrests Sanjay for framing Jhanvi's father.

Jhanvi becomes pregnant with Viraj's baby. Viraj is not happy to see Jhanvi's grandmother, Sudha at home. He hires a mute maid, named Geeta to keep an eye on Sudha. Viraj's plan backfires on Sudha, when she manages to enter a closed room of the house and get her hands on a file. Sudha arrives at his doctor, Komolika Rana and she, knows everything about Viraj and his bad behavior. Later, Viraj organises Siya's engagement, with his employee in a hotel. Sudha arrives at the hotel, intending to tell everyone about Viraj's past. But, before she is able to meet anyone, Viraj locks her at the terrace and starts arguing, and throwing things at her, resulting in her falling. She gets paralyzed.

It turns out that, Geeta can in fact speak and is actually Viraj's mother. He beats her for helping Sudha, but Jhanvi comes home and hears everything. Viraj pushes Jhanvi on a table, which, makes her suffer a miscarriage. She becomes traumatized and starts imagining her child "Krishna" in the cradle. She does not face her problems.

Viraj discovers that, Sanjay has been released from jail. Sanjay tries to tell Jhanvi about Viraj, but she refuses to believe him. Viraj sees the two of them on the CCTV of his house. So, a tense Viraj takes Jhanvi to a room and shows his family picture to her, who had died in his childhood. He reveals everything about his past and asks her not to ever leave him. Out of frustration, he tries to hit Jhanvi, but she does not react, due to her promise.

Unable to bear Viraj's torture, Jhanvi attempts to kill herself. Later, Geeta encourages Jhanvi to live and face her problems. Dr. Komolika suspects Viraj of Sudha's illness and Sanjay's arrest. She and Jhanvi try to get Viraj treated for his condition. He takes the treatment for sometime, but it later turns out that, he was faking it. Jhanvi then tells an NGO about Viraj's abuse, angering him. Viraj mistreats his mother. He then forcibly takes Jhanvi in his car and drops her at her parents' house. Jahnvi breaks down on seeing her family members' dead bodies. She screams at Viraj, but he tells her that, he does not care and continues to torture her, burning her house and walking seven "pheras" of marriage with her. She loses all her senses and collapses. The next day, he says that, since they got "married" the previous night, they should consummate it. Geeta sedates Viraj's milk, saving Jhanvi. Desperate to escape, Jhanvi fakes her own death, changes her identity to Sia and flees from Viraj, but Geeta dies from an accident they meet. Sia meets Raghav in Gurgaon, who falls in love, with her. She becomes a governess to his nephew, Krish, and comes to be loved, by his family.

Viraj tracks her down and creates misunderstandings with Raghav's family. Sia finally stands up to him and realizing her love for Raghav, divorces Viraj, who is sent to a mental asylum and marries Raghav.

=== 1 year later ===
Raghav's brother, Dev and his wife, Komal are killed. Raghav learns that, the killer is their family friend ACP Saxena, who moonlights as a criminal, named Rana. When Viraj discovered Rana's truth, Rana used electroshock therapy to reduce Viraj's mental ability to that of a seven-year-old child. Raghav manages to get Rana arrested and saves Viraj from near death. He helps Viraj regain his memory after, which Viraj tries to win Sia back, but Raghav decides to return him to prison.

On their way, they are attacked, by goons, who kill Raghav. Raghav dies, with Sia's name on his lips and Viraj is blamed for the murder. He tries to convince Jhanvi, but also wants her back in his life. He poisons her and tells her that, he will administer the antidote only, when she tells him she loves him. She refuses and dies telling Viraj that, she had only loved Raghav and that, her heart will live on to ensure Viraj has to pay for his misdeeds.

=== After Jhanvi's death ===
Jhanvi's heart is donated to a TV journalist, named Ananya. Aware of Jhanvi and Viraj's story, Ananya digs deeper and discovers that, Viraj had killed Jhanvi. She tries to expose him, but initially fails. Viraj finds out about the operation and is angered that, something was stolen from Jhanvi and tries to get her heart back.

Ananya discovers Viraj has been hiding Jhanvi's dead body and finds it, and takes it to be cremated. Viraj tries to stop her, but she curses him and he suddenly realizes how wrong he has been. Emotionally destroyed, he surrenders himself to the police and is sentenced to 14 years in prison. The story ends, with Ananya's heart finally forgiving Viraj, who is shown to be repenting his actions and living in prison, with Jhanvi's memories.

== Cast ==
=== Main ===
- Karanvir Bohra as Viraj Dobriyal: Geeta's son; Jhanvi's ex-husband and murderer (2011-2013)
- Sriti Jha as Jhanvi Viraj Dobriyal/Sia Sharma: Viraj's ex-wife; Raghav's widow; Krish's governess turned maternal aunt (2011-2013)
- Harshad Chopda as Raghavendra "Raghav" Pratap Singh: Dev's younger brother; Jhanvi's second husband; Krish's maternal uncle (2011-2013)

=== Recurring ===
- Mala Salariya as Ananya Ghosh: a journalist who receives Jhanvi's heart
- Vinay Rohrra as Rajendra Khanna aka Raj: Ananya's friend (2012-2013)
- Mouli Dutta as Paromita Ghosh
- Jaya Ojha as Uma Sharma (2011-2013)
- Akanksha Juneja as Tanisha (2012-2013)
- Sudha Chandran as Ms. Vyas (2012)
- Neha Mehta as Dr. Komal Singh: Raghav's sister-in-law
- Yash Ghanekar as Krish Singh: Dev and Komal's son; Raghav's nephew
- Kiran Bhargava as Sudha Sharma: Jhanvi and Siya's grandmother (2012)
- Sumukhi Pendsey as Gayatri Singh
- Sulagna Chatterjee as Siya Sharma: Jhanvi's younger sister
- Natasha Rana as Geeta: Viraj's mother
- Ram Mehar Jangra as Unniyal: Viraj's employee
- Zubin Dutt as Sanjay Sinha: Jhanvi's friend
- Urvashi Dholakia as Dr. Komolika Rana: Viraj and Payal's doctor, who helps Jhanvi get her new identity (2012)
- Fenil Umrigar as Priya Malhotra (2012)
- Vaquar Shaikh as Mr. Shekhawat (2012)
- Sagar Naik as Dr. Bhandari

== Reception ==
The show focussed on struggle of a woman to save herself from her obsessive, abusive husband. The Times of India stated that Bohra's and Sriti's performance brought higher TRPs to the show.

== Sequel ==
In August 2023, Star Bharat announced a sequel of the series, titled Saubhagyavati Bhava: * Niyam Aur Shartein Laagu. It began airing on 26 September 2023, starring Amandeep Sidhu, Karanvir Bohra and Dheeraj Dhoopar.
