= Shaurya Aur Suhani =

- Created by: Sphere Origins
- Written by: Jay Verma
- Directed by: Partho Mitra
- Opening theme: None
- Country of origin: India
- Original language: Hindi
- No. of episodes: Total 66

Production
- Producers: Sunjoy Wadhawa; Comall Sunjoy Wadahawa
- Running time: Approx. 54 minutes
- Production company: Sphere Origins

Original release
- Network: Star Plus
- Release: 21 March – 16 August 2009

Shaurya Aur Suhani is a show on Star Plus which premiered on 21 March 2009. It is a fantasy based show which focuses on Shaurya and Suhani's love story. The serial is produced by Sphere Origins.

== Plot ==
Shaurya aur Suhani is a story about Shaurya who is a destiny child, born to a royal family but living in the jungle, he is unaware of his royal roots. To protect him at the time of his birth, he was taken away from his royal family and lived in the jungles – to grow up to be Shaurya – a strong and tough man.

This fight and struggle for his kingdom is intertwined with his romantic love story with Princess Suhani. The story portrays love story of two human beings, who are separated by class and find their way to each other's heart.

== Cast ==
=== Main ===
- Saurabh Pandey as Shaurya
- Sriti Jha as Suhani

=== Recurring ===
- Manish Wadhwa as Takshak
- Vineet Kumar Chaudhary as Simha
- Mohammad Nazim
- Manoj Verma as Veer Bhadra
- Shaji Choudhary as Aghor
- Lilliput as Bhasundi
- Rohit Purohit as Chitwan
- Priya Bathija
- Roshmita as Rati
- Ankit Shah as Dara
- Rahul Dosani as Chelu
- Geeta
