= Maat Pitaah Ke Charnon Mein Swarg =

- Genre: Drama
- Created by: Director's Kut Productions
- Written by: Zama Habib; Garima Goyal; Salil Sand; M.P. Anamika
- Directed by: Rajan Shahi
- Creative directors: Rajan Shahi; Salil Sand
- Starring: See below
- Voices of: Alka Yagnik; Naveen Tripathi
- Theme music composer: Naveen - Manish
- Opening theme: "Maat Pitaah Ke Charnon Mein Swarg"
- Country of origin: India
- Original language: Hindi
- No. of seasons: 1
- No. of episodes: 245

Production
- Producer: Rajan Shahi
- Production location: Vrindavan
- Editor: Sameer Gandhi
- Camera setup: Multi-camera
- Running time: Approx. 24 minutes
- Production company: Director's Kut Productions

Original release
- Network: Colors TV
- Release: 29 June 2009 – 4 June 2010

Maat Pitaah Ke Charnon Mein Swarg (transl. Heaven Lies at the Feet of Parents) is an Indian television series based on the concept of love, emotion and respect among children and parents. The series premiered on Colors TV on 29 June 2009, and is produced by Rajan Shahi. This follows the story of Shubh, who faces many ups and downs in his life but always tries to obey and serve his parents. It was dubbed in Telugu as Swargam on Gemini TV. A ₹17.5-crore Porsche car was used in a sequence.

== Plot ==
Shubh, the only son of Kamala and Satyanarayan Tripathi, is a bright and affectionate boy. He is disabled and needs an operation on one of his legs. However, Kamala dies in a stampede while trying to raise enough money to pay for Shubh's operation. Satyanarayan gets remarried to Yashoda, who is very fond of Shubh. Even though the Tripathi family is able to raise enough money, doctors reveal that it is too late for Shubh's operation.

Shubh grows up into a mature and responsible young man. He dotes on his younger half brothers: Arjun and Ansh. Being disabled, Shubh has to face many insults and disappointments but remains unwavering in his devotion to God and to Satyanarayan and Yashoda. Satyanarayan especially trusts Shubh. Arjun marries Lalita and Shubh marries Suhani. Arjun and Lalita start poisoning Yashoda's mind against Shubh and Suhani. As a result, Yashoda's love for Shubh begins to waver. This leads to a series of complications with Shubh and Suhani leaving the Tripathi house, Suhani vanishes but is later found with a changed appearance, and Arjun taking over the control of the household with Lalita's help.

In the end, all gets well, though the Tripathi family suffers some irreversible losses in the process.

== Cast ==
- Pracheen Chauhan as Shubh Tripathi: Satyanarayan and Kamala's son; Yashoda's step son; Arjun and Ansh's half brother; Suhani's husband
- Archana Taide / Megha Gupta as Suhani Tripathi: Aastha's younger sister; Shubh's wife
- Yatin Karyekar as Satyanarayan Tripathi: Manorama's brother; Kamala and Yashoda's husband; Shubh, Arjun and Ansh's father
- Pooja Madaan as Kamala Tripathi: Satyanarayan's first wife; Shubh's mother
- Jyoti Gauba as Yashoda Tripathi: Satyanarayan's second wife; Arjun and Ansh's mother; Shubh's stepmother
- Nikhil Chaddha as Arjun Tripathi: Yashoda and Satyanarayan's elder son; Ansh's brother; Shubh's half brother; Lalita's husband
- Shamin Mannan as Lalita Tripathi: Arjun's wife
- Dheeraj Dhoopar as Ansh Tripathi: Yashoda and Satyanarayan's younger son; Arjun's brother; Shubh's half brother, Gayatri's second husband
- Amardeep Jha as Mehru Chachi: Shubh's grandmother figure
- Avinash Wadhawan as Kalishwer
- Vinny Arora as Gayatri: Jhini and Tilluram's daughter
- Reshma Modi as Manorama: Satyanarayan's sister; Chandar's wife
- Rajendra Chawla as Chandar: Manorama's husband
- Shilpa Shinde as Aastha: Suhani's elder sister
- Sunil Jaitley as Tilluram: Jhini's husband; Gayatri's father
- Geeta Tyagi as Jhini: Tilluram's wife; Gayatri's mother
- Riddhi Dogra as Payal: Suhani's childhood friend
