= Parull Chaudhry =

Indian television actress

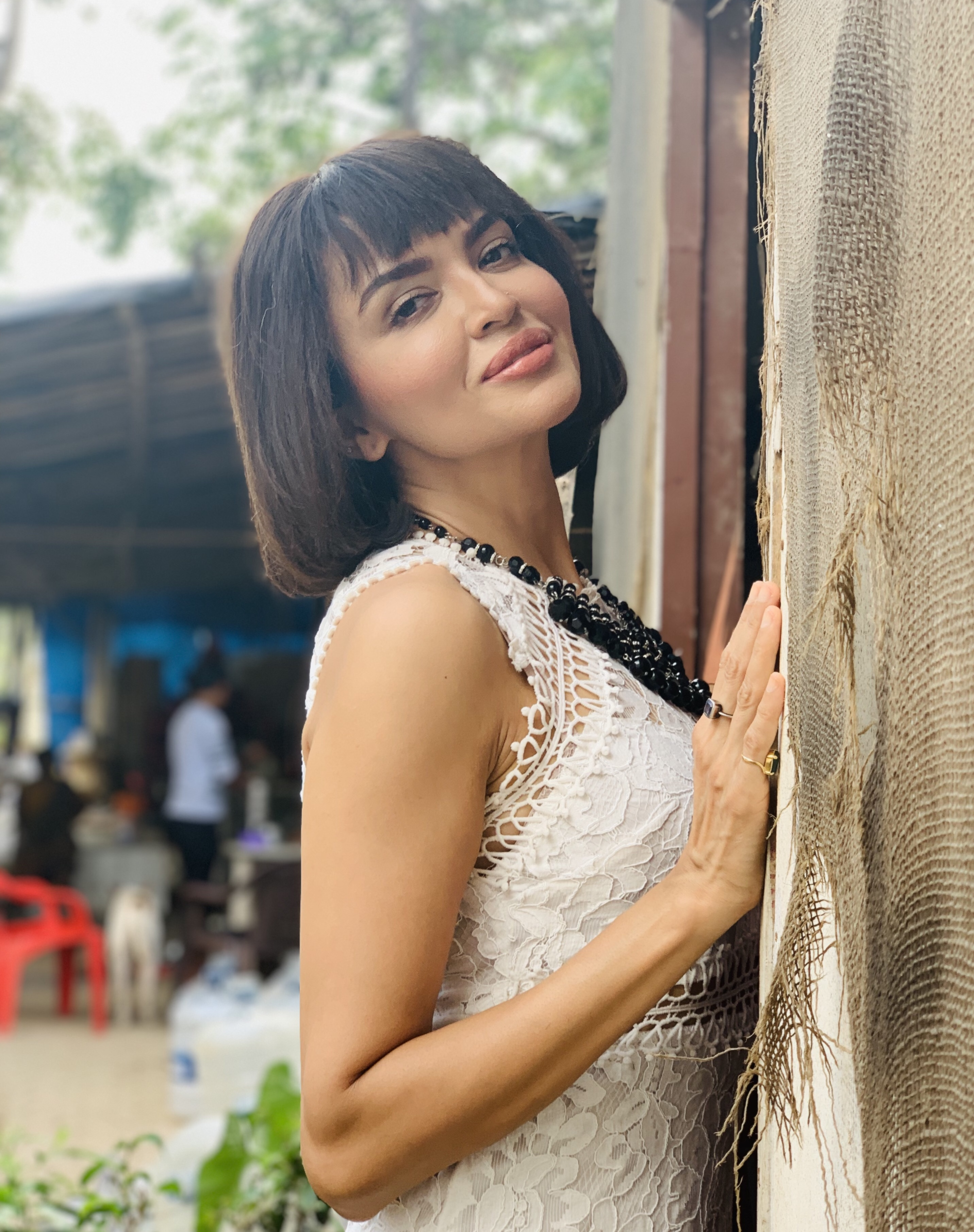
- Chaudhry in 2019
- Born: 5 February 1984/1986; New Delhi, India
- Occupations: Actress, YouTuber
- Known for: Ek Tha Raja Ek Thi Rani; Divya Drishti; Tere Mere Sapne; Savdhaan India; Piyaa Albela
- Political party: Bharatiya Janata Party (2026–present)
- Relatives: Snigdhaa Chaudhary (sister)

Parull Chaudhry is an Indian television series, film actress and YouTuber. She is recognized for her television serials such as Ek Tha Raja Ek Thi Rani, Divya Drishti, Tere Mere Sapne, Savdhaan India, Piyaa Albela.

== Career ==
Chaudhry began her career with the Star One horror-thriller serial Ssshhhh...Koi Hai. She starred in the television drama series Tere Mere Sapne as Kayma in 2009. The story concentrates on the question of migration from rural to the dream city, Mumbai. She appeared in the crime-drama show Adaalat and played various roles like Pranali Jagasia, Pranali Anurag Rastogi, and Sylvia Fernandes from 2010 to 2014. In 2015, she was cast in the drama-romance serial Ek Tha Raja Ek Thi Rani, playing the role of Kunwarani Kokila Chandravadan Singh Deo.

Chaudhry next appeared as Neelima Vyas in the television series Piyaa Albela in the year 2019. She was also a part of the fantasy show Divya Drishti and the drama series Kasautii Zindagii Kay as Rakhi Basu.

== Political career ==
Chaudhry joined the Bharatiya Janata Party on 8 May 2026 as a member of BJP Uttar Bhartiya Morcha.

== Filmography ==
=== Television ===
- Star One's Ssshhhh...Phir Koi Hai
- Zee TV's Aaj Ki Housewife Hai... Sab Jaanti Hai
- Star Plus's Baa Bahoo Aur Baby
- Sahara One's Haunted Nights, & Kuch Apne Kuch Paraye
- Sony SAB's Left Right Left
- Sony TV's Crime Patrol, Bhoot Aaya, Adaalat & Bhanwar
- Zee TV's Aaj Ki Housewife Hai... Sab Jaanti Hai, Ek Tha Raja Ek Thi Rani as Kunwarani Kokila Chandravadan Singh Deo
- Life OK's SuperCops vs Supervillains & Devon Ke Dev...Mahadev
- Star Plus's Tere Mere Sapne
- Zee Tv's Piya Albela as Neelima Vyas
- Star Plus's Phir Bhi Na Maane...Badtameez Dil
- Sony Pal's Tum Saath Ho Jab Apne as Nazima Yunuis Baig
- Zee TV's Ek Tha Raja Ek Thi Rani
- Star Plus's Divya-Drishti as Ashlesha "Ash" Shergill
- Star Plus's Kasautii Zindagii Kay as Rakhi Basu
- Star Plus's Anupamaa as Dr. Mona Chopra
- Zee TV's Bhagya Lakshmi as Karishma Chopra

=== Films ===
- Apna Aasmam in 2007
- Apartment in 2010
- Accident on hill road in 2009
- Dabur Vatika Brave and Beautiful in 2014
- Short Film - Watermelon in 2015
- The Last Koan (festival film) in 2019

=== Music video ===
- Harega Nahi India (2020) - sung by Gaurav Sharma
