= Vinny Arora =

Indian television actress (born 1991)

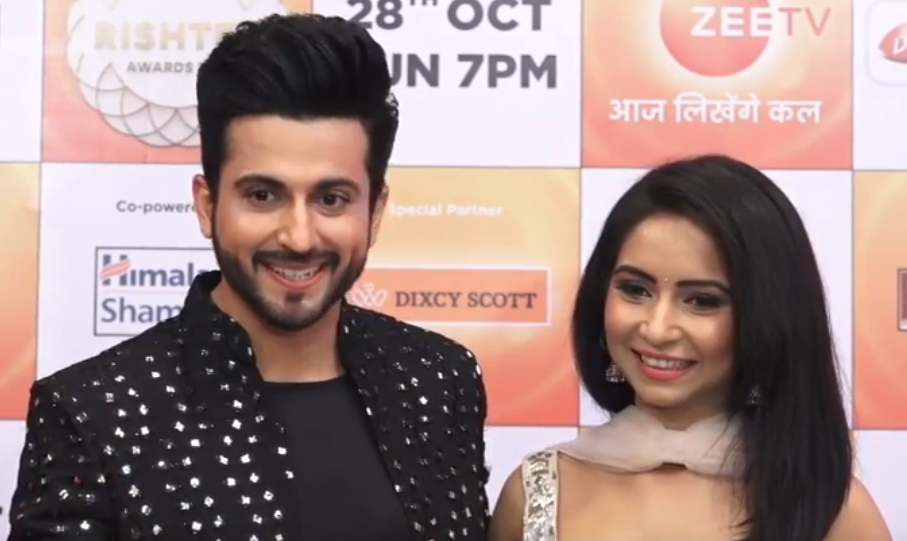
- Vinny (right) with husband Dheeraj Dhoopar (left) at Zee Rishtey Awards in 2018
- Born: 28 June 1991 (age 35)
- Other name: Vinny Arora Dhoopar
- Occupations: Actress; YouTuber
- Years active: 2007–present
- Known for: Laal Ishq; Laado – Veerpur Ki Mardani; Udaan
- Spouse: Dheeraj Dhoopar (m. 2016)
- Children: 1

Vinny Arora (born 28 June 1991) is a former Indian television actress and a Youtuber. She started her acting career with Kasturi. She later appeared in Kuchh Is Tara and Aathvaan Vachan. She went on to portray prominent roles in shows like Maat Pitaah Ke Charnon Mein Swarg, Shubh Vivah and Itna Karo Na Mujhe Pyaar. She was last seen playing Juhi Sethi in Colors TV's Laado – Veerpur Ki Mardani.

== Personal life ==
Arora married actor Dheeraj Dhoopar on 16 November 2016 in Delhi. They first met on the sets of Maat Pitaah Ke Charnon Mein Swarg in 2009. In April 2022, they announced that they were expecting their first child. On 10 August 2022, the couple had their first child, a boy.

== Career ==
Arora started working at a very young age. Her first appearance on television was at the age of 16. She has bagged most of the notable roles till date. She has been part of many entertainment channels like Star Plus, Sony TV, Colors TV and Life OK. She was seen in Yeh Hai Aashiqui on Bindass for an episode The Other Mummy as Sachi. Apart from TV soaps, Arora also appeared on a TV commercial for Sonata Watches Wedding Collection in 2015. She played the role of Asha, a teacher in the award-winning film Dhanak in 2016. She was last seen playing the role of Juhi Sethi in Laado – Veerpur Ki Mardani on Colors TV and Surbhi in the web series Pati Patni Aur Woh.

== Filmography ==
=== Films ===
Year	Title	Role	Notes	Ref.
2016	Dhanak	Asha		

=== Television ===
Year	Title	Role	Notes	Ref.
2007	Kasturi	Drashti		
2008	Kuchh Is Tara	Simran		
2008	Aathvaan Vachan	Urmila "Urmi" Shastri		
2009	Maat Pitaah Ke Charnon Mein Swarg	Gayatri		
2011	Crime Patrol	Roshni Patel	Episodic appearance	
2012	Shubh Vivah	Neelu Saxena Nigam		
2012	Main Lakshmi Tere Aangan Ki	Ginnu		
2013	Fear Files	Nidhi		
2013	Rasoi Ki Rani	Herself	Guest appearance	
2013	Do Dil Ek Jaan	Ruksana		
2014	Yeh Hai Aashiqui	Sachi		
2014	Love By Chance	Koyal	Episode: "Pyaar Ka Ghulam"	
2014	Saraswatichandra	Khushi		
2014	Hum Hain Na	Satya		
2015	Code Red - Mukhota	Arpita	Episode 48	
2015	Itna Karo Na Mujhe Pyaar	Nishi Khanna		
2016	Udaan	Tina Raichand		
2018	Laado – Veerpur Ki Mardani	Juhi Sethi		
2018	Juzz Baatt	Herself	Guest appearance	
2018	Laal Ishq	Madhu	Episode 45	

=== Web series ===
Year	Title	Role	Notes	Ref.
2020	Pati Patni Aur Woh	Surbhi Sharma	MX Player series	

== See also ==
- List of Indian television actresses
