= Dheeraj Dhoopar =

Indian television actor (born 1984)

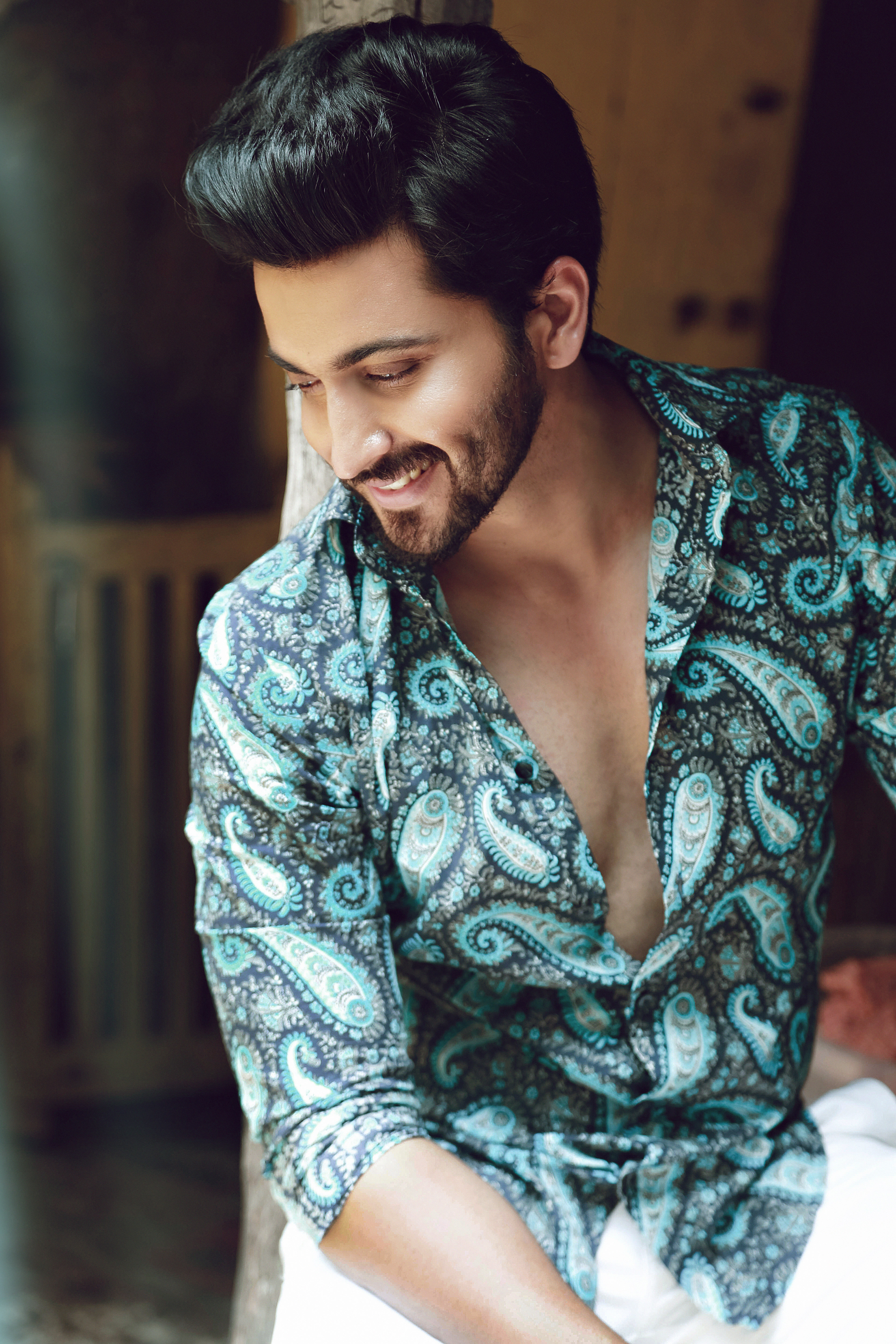
- Born: 20 December 1984 (age 41); New Delhi, India
- Occupations: Actor; model
- Years active: 2009–present
- Notable work: Sasural Simar Ka; Kundali Bhagya
- Spouse: Vinny Arora (m. 2016)
- Children: 1

Dheeraj Dhoopar (born 20 December 1984) is an Indian actor and model who appears in Hindi television. He is best known for his portrayal of Prem Bharadwaj in Sasural Simar Ka and Karan Luthra in Kundali Bhagya for which he received several awards including Gold Awards and Indian Television Academy Awards for Best Actor Male (Popular).

== Personal life ==
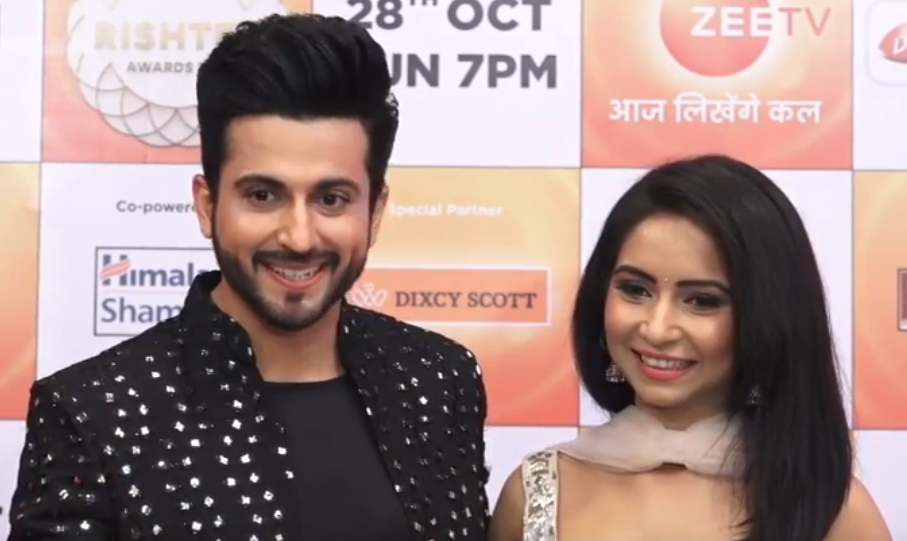
Dhoopar with wife Vinny Arora at Zee Rishtey Awards, 2018

Dhoopar was born to Sushil Dhoopar on 20 December 1984. He belongs to a Punjabi Hindu family.

He married actress Vinny Arora on 16 November 2016 in Delhi. They first met on the sets of Maat Pitaah Ke Charnon Mein Swarg. In April 2022, they announced that they were expecting their first child. On 10 August 2022, the couple had their first child, a boy.

== Career ==
Dhoopar started his career as a model and featured in over hundred commercials for brands like Maruti Suzuki, Parker, Dabur Honey, Samsung Galaxy, Videocon Mobile. Before venturing in acting, Dhoopar did an advanced course in fashion designing as well as worked as an airline cabin crew member.

Dhoopar made his television debut with Maat Pitaah Ke Charnon Mein Swarg as Ansh. He also played Bhavesh Patel in Star Plus's Behenein, Sushant in Mrs. Tendulkar and Shikhar in Zindagi Kahe – Smile Please. He also made a cameo appearance in Sony TV's Kuch Toh Log Kahenge.

From 2013 to 2017, he portrayed Prem Bhardwaj in Colors TV's Sasural Simar Ka opposite Dipika Kakar. He also hosted the grand finale of Sa Re Ga Ma Pa. From 12 July 2017 to 9 June 2022, he played the lead role of Karan Luthra in Zee TV's Kundali Bhagya opposite Shraddha Arya for 5 years.

In 2019, he also hosted Dance India Dance 7 but later quit.

In 2020, Dhoopar portrayed a cameo role of Cheel Akesh and Shakura respectively, opposite Hina Khan in Naagin 5.

In June 2022, Dhoopar quit Kunda li Bhagya To focus On New Projects and Parenthood . In July 2022, Dhoopar announced that he is participating in Jhalak Dikhhla Jaa 10 but walked out of the show in Week 4 owing to health and personal issues. From September 2022 to February 2023, he was seen in Colors TV's Sherdil Shergill as Rajkumar Yadav opposite Surbhi Chandna.

From September 2023 to December 2023, he portrayed Raghav, a grey character, in Star Bharat's Saubhagyavati Bhava: * Niyam Aur Shartein Laagu alongside Karanvir Bohra and Amandeep Sidhu.

From February 2024 to December 2024, he was seen in Rabb Se Hai Dua portraying the role of Subhaan Siddiqui opposite Yesha Rughani.

== Media ==
Dhoopar was ranked in The Times Most Desirable Men On TV at No. 12 in 2019, at No. 9 in 2020.

Dhoopar was ranked in The Times Most Desirable Men at No. 47 in 2019, at No. 45 in 2020.

== Filmography ==
=== Television ===
| Year | Serial | Role | Notes | Ref. |
|---|---|---|---|---|
| 2009–2010 | Maat Pitaah Ke Charnon Mein Swarg | Ansh Tripathi | | |
| 2010–2011 | Behenein | Bhavesh Patel | | |
| 2011 | Mrs. Tendulkar | Sushant | | |
| 2011 | Zindagi Kahe – Smile Please | Shikhar | | |
| 2012 | Kuch Toh Log Kahenge | Amar | | |
| 2013–2017 | Sasural Simar Ka | Prem Bharadwaj | | |
| 2014–2016 | Box Cricket League | Contestant | 2 seasons | |
| 2016 | Sohaagi Sindoor | Dhruv | | |
| 2016 | Comedy Nights Bachao | Himself | Guest | |
| 2017–2022 | Kundali Bhagya | Karan "TKL" Luthra | | |
| 2017 | Entertainment Ki Raat | Himself | Guest | |
| 2019 | Sa Re Ga Ma Pa | Host | Grand Finale | |
| 2019 | DID: Battle Of The Champions | Host | 2 episodes | |
| 2019 | Haiwaan: The Monster | Unnamed | Cameo | |
| 2020 | Naagin 5 | Akesh/Shakura | Cameo | |
| 2021 | Indian Pro Music League | Himself | Guest | |
| 2022 | Jhalak Dikhhla Jaa 10 | Contestant | 15th place | |
| 2022–2023 | Sherdil Shergill | Rajkumar Yadav | | |
| 2023 | Saubhagyavati Bhava: * Niyam Aur Shartein Laagu | Raghav Jindal | | |
| 2024 | Rabb Se Hai Dua | Subhaan "SS" Siddiqui | | |
| 2026 | Lock Upp 2: Sach Ya Saza | Contestant | 11th place | |

=== Music videos ===
| Year | Title | Singer(s) | Ref. |
|---|---|---|---|
| 2020 | Viah Nai Karuana | Asees Kaur | |
| 2020 | Mera Dil | Mairien James | |
| 2020 | Humko Tum Mil Gaye | Naresh Sharma and Vishal Mishra | |
| 2021 | Jogiya | Shibani Kashyap | |
| 2022 | Kafan | Shekhar Khanijo | |

=== Web series ===
| Year | Title | Role | Ref. |
|---|---|---|---|
| 2023 | Tatlubaaz | Bulbul Tyagi | |

== Awards and nominations ==
| Year | Award | Category | Show | Result | Ref. |
|---|---|---|---|---|---|
| 2015 | 15th Indian Television Academy Awards | Rishtey Naate Award | Sasural Simar Ka | Won | |
| 2018 | Gold Awards | Best Actor Male (Popular) | Kundali Bhagya | Nominated | |
| 2018 | Gold Awards | Best Jodi (Popular) (with Shraddha Arya) | Kundali Bhagya | Nominated | |
| 2019 | Indian Telly Awards | Best Actor in Lead Role (Popular) | Kundali Bhagya | Nominated | |
| 2019 | Indian Telly Awards | Best Jodi (Popular) (with Shraddha Arya) | Kundali Bhagya | Nominated | |
| 2019 | Gold Awards | Best Actor Male (Popular) | Kundali Bhagya | Won | |
| 2019 | Gold Awards | Best Jodi (Popular) (with Shraddha Arya) | Kundali Bhagya | Nominated | |
| 2020 | Gold Glam and Style Awards | Professional Glamorous Star (Male) TV | —N/a | Won | |
| 2022 | 21st Indian Television Academy Awards | Best Actor (Popular) | Kundali Bhagya | Won | |
| 2022 | 22nd Indian Television Academy Awards | Popular Actor - Drama | Kundali Bhagya | Nominated | |
| 2022 | Iconic Gold Awards | Iconic Best tv Actor of the year | Kundali Bhagya | Won | |
| 2022 | Iconic Gold Awards | Iconic Most Stylish TV Actor of the Year | Kundali Bhagya | Won | |
| 2023 | Iconic Gold Awards | Television Personality of the Year | Kundali Bhagya | Won | |

== See also ==
- List of Indian television actors
