= Aathvaan Vachan =

Indian television series

- Also known as: Aathvaan Vachan - Saath Vachano Se Badkar
- Written by: Rahool Bose; Nikhil Dev
- Directed by: Bhushan Patel
- Starring: see below
- Theme music composer: Prakash Gaikwad & Prabhakar Marwade
- Opening theme: "Aathvaan Vachan" by Pamela Jain
- Country of origin: India
- No. of episodes: 139

Production
- Producer: Shristi Arya
- Running time: 23 minutes
- Production company: Rose Audio Visuals

Original release
- Network: Sony Entertainment Television
- Release: 1 September 2008 – 21 May 2009

Aathvaan Vachan - Saath Vachano Se Badhkar (transl. The Eighth Vow - Greater Than The Seven Vows) is an Indian Hindi television series that aired on Sony Entertainment Television India from 1 September 2008 to 21 May 2009.

== Plot ==
The story is based on the life of a young woman named Manali, with a mentally challenged younger sister, Urmi. Usually, a traditional Hindu marriage involves seven vows. Manali marries Aadesh, who takes an eighth vow (aathvaan vachan) that he will take care of Urmi for life. The show traces the story of their lives as a family.

Urmi's arrival to their home does not go down well with most members of Aadesh's family. Manali tries her best to balance her duties as a wife, a sister, and a daughter-in-law. Some time later, Manali is murdered mysteriously but Aadesh's mother covers up the truth and Aadesh is told that it was an accident. As Aadesh tries to pick up the pieces after this sudden tragedy, he must take care of Urmi. Gradually, Urmi begins to recover. Aadesh's family wants him to remarry but he continues to be committed to the promise of caring for Urmi. As time passes, complications arise as a recovering Urmi realises she may have deeper feelings for Aadesh. However, by now Aadesh is engaged to business partner Sneha who he connects with based on their past experiences of getting over personal tragedies. A conflicted Urmi decides to finally leave Aadesh's life so they can both move on but now Aadesh feels uncomfortable at the idea of Urmi living independently.

== Cast ==
- Vishal Singh as Aadesh
- Mouli Ganguly as Manali
- Vinny Arora as Urmila Shastri/Urmi
- Alka Kaushal / Niyati Joshi as Aadesh's mother
- Sulabha Arya as Manali and Urmi's mother
- Varun Khandelwal as Tarun, Aadesh's older brother
- Nivaan Sen as Football Coach
- Dimple Inamdar as Tarun's wife
- Manish Khanna
- Pallavi Subhash as Sneha Ahuja, who is later engaged to Aadesh
- Gulfam Khan as Biloo Mausi
