= The Casino (Indian TV series) =

Indian web series

- Official poster
- Genre: Crime; Action thriller
- Written by: Girish Dhamija; Deepak Pachory
- Directed by: Hardik Gajjar; Tushar Bhatia
- Starring: Karanvir Bohra; Sudhanshu Pandey; Aindrita Ray; Mandana Karimi
- Country of origin: India
- Original language: Hindi
- No. of seasons: 1
- No. of episodes: 10

Production
- Producers: KVB Entertainment; Gajjar Parth; Richa Amod Sachan
- Production location: India
- Running time: Approx. 25 minutes
- Production company: Hardik Gajjar Films

Original release
- Network: Zee5
- Release: 12 June 2020 – present

The Casino - My Game, My Rules is a 2020 Hindi language streaming television series directed by Hardik Gajjar and Tushar Bhatia. It is written by Girish Dhamija and Deepak Pachory whereas produced by KVB Entertainment Gajjar Parth and Richa Amod Sachan. The series marks the digital debut of actors Karanvir Bohra and Mandana Karimi. The series started streaming on ZEE5 from 12 June 2020.

== Cast ==
- Karanvir Bohra as Vikramaditya (Vicky) Singh Marwah
- Sudhanshu Pandey as Shailendra Singh Marwah
- Aindrita Ray as Camilla Khurana
- Mandana Karimi as Rehana Chaudhari
- Pooja Banerjee as Riya Marwah
- Gungun Uprari as Roop Marwah
- Rajesh Khera as Deshmukh
- Mantra as Rinzin
- Micky Makhija as Commissioner

== Production ==
=== Filming ===
Principal photography commenced in Nepal with the lead actors Karanvir Bohra and Mandana Karimi, and they had been spotted shooting on Wednesday 22 January 2020.

== Marketing and release ==
=== Promotion ===
The official trailer of the webseries was launched on 12 May 2020 by ZEE5 on YouTube.

=== Release ===
The Casino - My Game, My Rules was available for streaming on ZEE5 from 12 June 2020.

== Episodes ==
| No. overall | No. in season | Title | Directed by | Written by | Original release date |
|---|---|---|---|---|---|
| 1 | 1 | "Queen of Hearts" | Hardik Gajjar, Tushar Bhatia | Girish Dhamija, Deepak Pachory | 12 June 2020 |
| 2 | 2 | "King of Casino" | Hardik Gajjar, Tushar Bhatia | Girish Dhamija, Deepak Pachory | 12 June 2020 |
| 3 | 3 | "The Reluctant Prince" | Hardik Gajjar, Tushar Bhatia | Girish Dhamija, Deepak Pachory | 12 June 2020 |
| 4 | 4 | "End of King" | Hardik Gajjar, Tushar Bhatia | Girish Dhamija, Deepak Pachory | 12 June 2020 |
| 5 | 5 | "Rise of Queen" | Hardik Gajjar, Tushar Bhatia | Girish Dhamija, Deepak Pachory | 12 June 2020 |
| 6 | 6 | "Bad Players of the Game" | Hardik Gajjar, Tushar Bhatia | Girish Dhamija, Deepak Pachory | 12 June 2020 |
| 7 | 7 | "Friends with Benefits" | Hardik Gajjar, Tushar Bhatia | Girish Dhamija, Deepak Pachory | 12 June 2020 |
| 8 | 8 | "Playing Blind in Love" | Hardik Gajjar, Tushar Bhatia | Girish Dhamija, Deepak Pachory | 12 June 2020 |
| 9 | 9 | "Rise of the Prince" | Hardik Gajjar, Tushar Bhatia | Girish Dhamija, Deepak Pachory | 12 June 2020 |
| 10 | 10 | "Trojan Horse" | Hardik Gajjar, Tushar Bhatia | Girish Dhamija, Deepak Pachory | 12 June 2020 |

== Soundtrack ==
Track listing
| No. | Title | Lyrics | Music | Singer(s) | Length |
|---|---|---|---|---|---|
| 1. | "I am the Queen" | Shabbir Ahmed | Poonam | Bhoomi Trivedi, Shannon | 1:52 |
| 2. | "Bang Bang" | Shabbir Ahmed | Poonam | Shannon, Saumitra Dev Berman | 1:47 |
| 3. | "Casino Title" | Shabbir Ahmed | Poonam | Sunidhi Chauhan | 1:30 |
| 4. | "O Chunarwali" | Shabbir Ahmed | Poonam | Dev Negi, Ikka, Saloni Thakkar | 2:37 |
