= Ganga Kii Dheej =

Indian TV drama series

- Genre: Drama
- Written by: Mahesh Pandey; Manish Paliwal; Nageen Mirza; Vandna Oberoi Sharma; Anupama Mishra; Prakriti Mukherjee
- Directed by: Anil V. Kumar; Saagar Kagra
- Creative director: Anil V. Kumar
- Starring: See below
- Theme music composer: 1
- Composer: Dony Hazarika
- Country of origin: India
- Original language: Hindi
- No. of seasons: 1
- No. of episodes: 135

Production
- Camera setup: Multi-camera
- Running time: Approx. 24 minutes

Original release
- Network: Sahara One
- Release: 15 November 2010 – 3 June 2011

Ganga Kii Dheej (transl. Ganga's shelter) is an Indian television drama series which premiered on 15 November 2010 on Sahara One. The story dealt with the ordeals faced by young unmarried women in a fictional village called Kaliganj in West Bengal.

== Plot ==
The story revolves around a young girl named Pakhi who lives in Kaliganj village where all the girls are protected under strict surveillance before they are married. This results in a lack of freedom of their own until marriage. But before they can start their married life, they must go through a test of purity (Ganga kii Dheej). The test is to find out if the girl is pure or not and if not, she has committed some sort of impure thing or had an impure thought in her life. This is carried out by Maha Mai, who asks that the bride to be to walk 25 steps holding her hand, while underwater.

Sharmi, who is Pakhi's friend makes it 24 steps before she cannot hold her breath any longer. Maha Mai calls her impure and this makes Sharmi's father rage and throw a stone at Maha Mai, who in return gets Sharmi stoned as a punishment from the villagers and sent to Nark ki Dawar, where the impure girls live their entire life and her family is shamed and never spoken to again. This religion is a hoax to hide the real reason behind Ganga kii Dheej.

DadaBhai who is the village head has joined hands with Maha Mai to prove all girls impure and send them to his cottage in the jungle so that he can take advantage of them and have fun and then send them off to their way out of the village. On the other side Pakhi and her friends run into Shivom in the temple where all the girls do pooja every morning. Not knowing about the rules, Shivom takes a picture of all the girls doing pooja and Pakhi becomes outraged and calls the brothers who escort the young girls to the temple. This results in Shivom being beaten and him blaming Pakhi for getting him hurt. After Shivom saves Pakhi's father's life, the two bump into each other a couple of times and start to like each other. Dadabhai sees Pakhi running in the farms without her veil and decides that she is the girl to be married next. He plans with Maha Mai to get her married in the next 7 days so that she can be unsuccessful in Ganga kii Dheej and sent to him. Maha Mai convinces Pakhi's father to get his daughter married as she is of age now. she gives him one day and when he fails to do so Maha Mai finds a groom for them and her wedding is decided after 7 days. In the midst of this, Shivom finds out that the groom that has been decided is mentally disabled. When this is discovered all are worried because Pakhi's marriage has been broken so who will marry her now. On the other hand, Dadabhai is upset because he will not be able to meet Pakhi. Shivom decides to marry Pakhi and also that she will not go on the Ganga kii Dheej. He goes to the city and tells Pakhi he is going to stop this tradition forever and he will be back. Shivom send news reporters to the place where Pakhi is to prove her purity. Maha Mai handles the situation and decides to give Pakhi the ultimate purity test because of the reporters. She needs to hold a leaf in her hand filled with ganaga jaal and walk 25 steps along a stone path while being blindfolded and she must not spill even a drop of ganga jaal or she will be proved impure. Again on the 24th step Pakhi fails.

Shivom on the other hand gets kidnapped so he is unable to get to Paaakhi in time but Agantuk, Dadabhai'sson gets there just as they are about to take Pakhi to Narak ki Dawar and marries her. He decided that he will also go with her. While in Narak Kii Dawar, Pakhi feels Sharmi is there but before she can be sure she and Aguntuk are taken back out of the jungle back home with respect because of circumstances. When Pakhi goes home to her in-laws no one is able to accept her except for her mother in law. Shivom escapes only to find out that Pakhi is already married.

== Cast ==
- Leena Jumani as Pakhi, Agantuk’s wife
- Mohit Raina as Agantuk, Pakhi’s husband
- Kabir Bedi as Dadabhai Thakur, Pakhi's father-in-law, Agantuk's father
- Ashwini Kalsekar as Maha Mai
- Saurabh Pandey/Jatin Shah as Shivom
- Pratima Kazmi as the second Maha Mai
- Nandini Singh as Uttara
- Kritika Kamra as Geeta
