= Jiya Jale =

Indian television series

- Created by: Big Synergy
- Screenplay by: Anil Nagpal; Bhavna Vyas; Pinki Shah
- Story by: Anil Nagpal; Kavita Nagpal
- Directed by: Arvind Babbal
- Starring: see below
- Opening theme: "Jiya Jale" by Shreya Ghoshal
- Country of origin: India

Production
- Producer: Siddhartha Basu
- Running time: approx. 24 minutes

Original release
- Network: 9X
- Release: 19 November 2007 – 19 June 2008

Jiya Jale is an Indian television series that aired on 9X channel from 19 November 2007 to 19 June 2008.

== Plot ==
The story is based on the life of an ordinary girl Sunaina, who was brought up in a close and caring family. The story takes off when Sunaina has just fallen in the love with the idea of love, when she meets Chandan. But they are also caught up in the trials and tribulations of hatred, deceit and betrayal, which changes their lives drastically. The question remains that will Sunaina and Chandan be able to hold their love for each other above all these problems?

== Cast ==
- Sriti Jha as Sunaina Kotak
- Saurabh Pandey as Chandan Bhimani
- Mahesh Thakur as Krishnakant Kotak
- Tapeshwari Sharma as Sujata Kotak
- Yasir Shah as Yug Suryavanshi
- Bharat Kaul as Virendra Bhimani
- Mihir Mishra
- Natasha Sinha as Chandrika Bhimani
- Bharati Achrekar as Chandan's grandmother
- Rakhi Vijan as Chandan's maternal aunt
- Shital Thakkar
- Sonia Rakkar/Rudrakshi Gupta as Chandan's stepmother
- Sushmita Daan as Anupama
- Nitin Chatterjee as Sunaina's younger brother Rohan
- Raj Logani as Dhanush Bhimani
- Mehul Nisar as Aatish
