= Anil V. Kumar =

Indian director and producer

Anil V Kumar (born 4 June 1975) is a television and film director and producer in India. He started his production house "Flying Turtle Films" with his partners Shabbir Ahluwalia and Sakett Saawhney in 2010. The shows he has directed include Kahaani Ghar Ghar Kii and Kahin To Hoga, both on Star Plus. In 2013, Flying Turtle Films co-produced the movie Zanjeer starring Priyanka Chopra and Ram Charan.

== Director ==
=== Films ===
- Kucch To Hai (2003)

=== Television ===
- Kitani Mohabbat Hai - NDTV Imagine (250 episodes)
- Dekha Ek Khwaab - Sony TV (Rose movies)
- Kis Desh Mein Hai Meraa Dil -Star plus( 100 episodes)
- Karam Apnaa Apnaa - Star TV(150 episodes)
- Kavyanjali - Star Plus ( 50 episodes)
- Kayamath - Star Plus ( 200 episodes)
- Kkoi Dil Mein Hai - Sony TV ( 100 episodes)
- Kitni Mast Hai Zindagi- MTV (full)
- Kasamh Se - Zee TV.(250 episodes)
- Kahin To Hoga - Star TV.(250 episodes)
- Kahaani Ghar Ghar Kii - Star Plus (350 episodes)
- Kkusum - Sony TV.( 380 episodes)
- Kaun - DD National.(12 episodes)
- Sujata- Sony TV (BR Telefilms)
- Ganga Kii Dheej - Sahara One
- Jodha Akbar - Zee TV
- Manasu Mamatha
- Meri Aashiqui Tumse Hi- Colors TV
- Itna Karo Na Mujhe Pyaar- Sony TV
- Thriller At 10
- Kundali Bhagya (2017; 2022)
- Ratri Ke Yatri (2022)

=== Web series ===
Year	Title	Platform	Notes
2020	Kehne Ko Humsafar Hain	ALTBalaji and ZEE5	

== Producer ==
=== Television ===
- Ganga Kii Dheej ( Sahara One)

=== Films ===
- Zanjeer (2013) Starring Priyanka Chopra, Ram Charan Teja, Sanjay Dutt, Mahie Gill
