= Love Yoou Soniye =

- Theatrical release poster
- Directed by: Sahil Kohli
- Screenplay by: Sahil Kohli
- Produced by: Karanvir Bohra; Teejay Sidhu
- Starring: Karanvir Bohra; Teejay Sidhu; Raghu Ram; Vindu Dara Singh; Upasana Singh
- Cinematography: Ashok Salian
- Edited by: Shiva Bayappa; Shekhar Reddy
- Music by: Rishi Rich; Juggy D; Harry Anand
- Production company: Firebird Entertainment Pvt. Ltd
- Distributed by: PVR Cinemas (India); B4U (UK)
- Release date: 6 December 2013
- Running time: 140 minutes
- Country: India
- Language: Punjabi

Love Yoou Soniye (English: Love You Sweetheart) is a 2013 Indian Punjabi language romantic comedy film directed by Sahil Kohli. The film stars Karanvir Bohra and Teejay Sidhu in lead roles, who also produced the film. Other cast includes Vindu Dara Singh, Upasna Singh and Hiten Paintal in supporting roles.

== Plot ==
Lovleen is an only child in the Sidhu family whose parents love her to the core. During her first day of college she meets a boy named Karanvir Singh Gill whom she hits with her car while he is riding his bike. Karanvir seeks revenge for the accident and decides to retaliate.

When Lovleen arrives at her classroom the next day, Karanvir poses as a professor and humiliates her. Karanvir invites his friends and Lovleen's best friend, Dolly, to a pub where he asks her to dance. While dancing, Karanvir accidentally touches Lovleen, which angers her and results in her attempt to slap him. The next day, she asks her friends to fight Karanvir but is not successful.

She takes Karanvir at unknown place where she frames him for raping her. He slaps her and reveals that he has romantic feelings for Lovleen. She reacts by saying that she is sorry for what she did and tries to apologize but Karanvir is not receptive. Later, Lovleen angrily shouts at Karanvir for ignoring her and tells him that she would never talk to him. Finally, he apologises to her, and they become best friends.

Karanvir expresses his emotions to his elder brother, Mahendra Singh Gill. As the time passes on, Karanvir confesses his love towards her and she reciprocate him as well. Eventually, Lovleen's father Kewal Sidhu learns about their love, but agrees to meet his family. In a showroom, Mahendra wants to give a car to Karanvir as a gift but chooses a car which has already been booked. Mahendra argues with the manager for the car and tries to slap him, but he is held back by the owner. He also fights with the owner and goes out of the showroom. The Gill brothers then head to Sidhu's house and learn that the owner was the notorious figure Kewal Sidhu. Kewal insults the Gill brothers which makes Karanvir furious and he vows to marry Lovleen at any cost. Meanwhile, Kewal arranges her marriage to a NRI Harmeet from Canada. Heartbroken, Karanvir tries to meet her but is held by security guards as he was not allowed to enter. Eventually, Lovleen, heartbroken and sad, confesses her feelings towards Karanvir to her aunt. Her dad listens to this and fills with rage, and he now wants Lovleen to marry the very next day. Lovleen pleads to Karanvir for a solution, but Karanvir has no option left but to leave Lovleen forever. Lovleen runs to find Karanvir and tell him to elope with her. Karanvir disagrees, but Lovleen threatens him that if he does not agree then she will commit suicide by jumping in a lake. She jumps but Karanvir dives to save her. Karanvir saves Lovleen and brings her back to the mansion. Upon their return, Karanvir is beaten by her uncle and brother. Kewal points the gun to shoot him, but Mahendra steps forward and saves him. Heartbroken, Gill brothers leaves the mansion. Loveleen pleads to her dad to leave her. Kewal, after a change of heart, finally agrees and Karanvir and Lovleen are united.

== Cast ==
- Karanvir Bohra as Karanvir Singh Gill / Parminder
- Teejay Sidhu as Lovleen Sidhu
- Raghu Ram as Mahendra Singh Gill (Karanvir's brother)
- Vindu Dara Singh as Billu (Lovleen's uncle (Chachu))
- Hiten Paintal as Harmeet (Lovleen's fiancée)
- Manav Gohil as real Parminder (cameo)
- Upasna Singh as Loveleen's aunt (Chachi)
- Tanya Abrol as Dolly
- Shavinder Mahal as Kewal Sidhu (Lovleen's father)
- Harry Anand as Lovleen's brother

== Music ==
The soundtrack of the film was composed by Rishi Rich, Juggy D and Harry Anand. The music event launch was held in PVR Elante in Chandigarh.

#	Title	Singer(s)
1	"Ek Pila"	Harry Anand (lyrics too)
2	"Labda Phira"	Shree D, Swaroop Khan, Palak Muchhal
3	"Love Karley"	ShreeD, Palak Muchhal
4	"Moti"	Ishq Bector, Shree D, Shivangi Bhayan
5	"Relief Ni"	Ashim Kemson, Isheta Sarckar
6	"Love Yoou Soniye (title track)"	Rishi Rich, Juggy D

== Filming and development ==
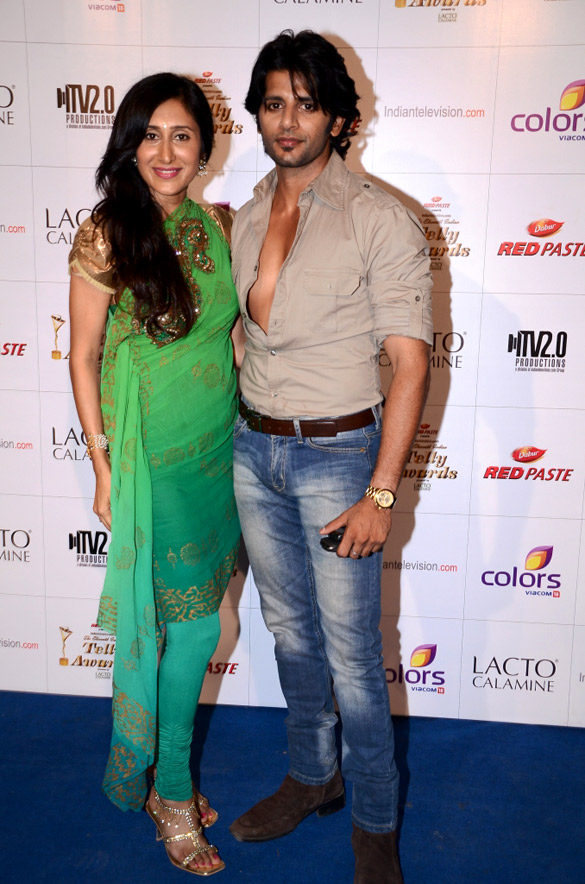
Karanvir Bohra with wife Teejay Sidhu as protagonists of film

Principal photography began in January 2013. The first schedule was completed in Baroda, Gujarat, whereas the second shooting schedule took place in Chandigarh, Punjab. Karanvir sported 2 looks in this film (One with a Sikh attire and second as a college student) . Teejay played his love interest. Raghu Ram played Karanvir's elder brother in the film whereas Vindu Dara Singh played Teejay's uncle in the film. For the most part, this film used common Bollywood film plots.

== Marketing ==
Promotional events took place in Ansal Plaza in Ferozepur, Amritsar, and PVR Elante in Chandigarh. The couple also promoted the film at London, where they had interviewed at BBC radio.
