= Tejaa =

1990 Indian action film

Tejaa तेजा
- Promotional Poster
- Directed by: Ramesh Puri
- Written by: Ramesh Puri
- Screenplay by: Mahendra Bohra
- Produced by: Mahendra Bohra
- Starring: Sanjay Dutt; Kimi Katkar
- Cinematography: Rajesh Patni
- Edited by: Subodh Shukla
- Music by: Anu Malik
- Release date: 7 December 1990 (India)
- Country: India
- Language: Hindi

Tejaa is an Indian Hindi-language action film directed by Ramesh Puri and produced by Mahendra Bohra. It stars Sanjay Dutt and Kimi Katkar in the main roles. The film performed above average at the box office.

== Plot ==
Lal Singh, Heeralal Ghosh, and Zoravar rob a bank's gold vault and take off with all the gold bars. They bury it deep in the countryside. Several weeks later, they return to share the bars but find them gone. Suspecting a nearby family has stolen them, they kill the husband and wife, Shanti, and hang the young son. They abscond upon hearing people coming to investigate this commotion. Twenty years later, a man named Tejaa meets with Lal Singh and kills him. Then Tejaa meets with Heeralal, befriends him, and then subsequently kills him. When Zoravar finds out that he could be Tejaa's next victim, he starts to take all possible precautions from this assailant, as well as lay an elaborate trap and ensure that they avenge their former partners and father, respectively.

== Cast ==
- Sanjay Dutt as Tejaa / Sanjay
- Karanvir Bohra as Young Teja
- Kimi Katkar as Sonu
- Sonu Walia as Heena
- Amrish Puri as Zoravar
- Ranjeet as Lal Singh
- Puneet Issar as Heeralal
- Beena Banerjee as Shanti (Tejaa's mother)
- Surendra Pal as Tejaa's father
- Viju Khote as Police Inspector, Special appearance
- Firoz Irani as Zoravar Henchman

== Songs ==
1. "Aage Aage Jaye Mera Dil" - Asha Bhosle
2. "Ambua Ka Pedh Hai" - Anuradha Paudwal
3. "Mera Chrcha Mumbai Se" - Kavita Krishnamurthy
4. "Een Meen Een Meen" - Alka Yagnik
