= Ramkumar Bohra =

Indian film producer (1928–1991)

- Born: 2 August 1928; Jodhpur, Rajasthan, India
- Died: 11 October 1991 (aged 63); Mumbai, Maharashtra, India
- Occupations: Film director; producer; actor; screenwriter
- Years active: 1946–1991
- Spouse: Madankumari Bohra (m. 1932; died 1991)
- Children: 3
- Relatives: Karanvir Bohra (grandson)

Ramkumar Bohra (pronounced [ˌɾɑːmkʊˈmɑːɾ ˈboːɦɾə]; 2 August 1928 – 11 October 1991) was an Indian film producer, director, actor, and screenwriter. Originally from Jodhpur, Rajasthan, he came to Bombay in 1947 to pursue a career in film. He, along with his brother Shree Ram Bohra, founded Bohra Bros in 1948. His grandson is actor Karanvir Bohra.

== Filmography ==
Year	Film
1948	Lachak
1951	Thief of Baghdad
1953	Jahaji Lootera
1957	Tikdambaaz
1959	Alhilal
1961	Dr Shaitan
1962	Haowrah Express
1963	Pedro
1964	Pataal Nagri
1964	Hercules
1965	Jaal thi Hofonisba
1965	Bhakt Prahlad
1966	Thief of Bhagdad
1967	Golden Eyes
1968	Puruskar
1970	Behrupiya
1971	Bijlee

== Sources ==
- "Ramkumar Bohra Video | Interviews". OVGuide.
- "Ramkumar Bohra". IMDb.
