= Saubhagyavati Bhava: * Niyam Aur Shartein Laagu =

Indian drama television series

- Genre: Psychological thriller supernatural fiction
- Written by: Anshuman Sinha; Bhavna Byas; Dhiraj Sarna
- Screenplay by: Anshuman Sinha
- Directed by: Nandita Mehra; Ismail Umarr Khan
- Starring: Dheeraj Dhoopar; Amandeep Sidhu; Karanvir Bohra
- Country of origin: India
- Original language: Hindi
- No. of episodes: 89

Production
- Producers: Sachin Pandey; Aditi Sachin Pandey
- Camera setup: Multi camera
- Running time: 20-23 minutes
- Production company: Bombay Show Studios LLP

Original release
- Network: Star Bharat
- Release: 26 September 2023 – 6 January 2024

Related
- Dil Se Di Dua... Saubhagyavati Bhava?

Saubhagyavati Bhava: * Niyam Aur Shartein Laagu (transl. May You Be Fortunate: *Terms and Conditions Apply) is an Indian Hindi-language television series produced by Bombay Show Studios LLP. It is a sequel of the 2011 series to the same name and stars Karanvir Bohra, Dheeraj Dhoopar and Amandeep Sidhu. The series premiered on 26 September 2023 on Star Bharat.

== Plot ==
After the events of the first opus, Viraj Dobriyal, supposed to be serving a 14-year prison sentence, is released 12 years into his sentence for good behavior. He becomes a social worker and tells that he has opened an organization called Jhanvi, using this position to protect the young women in his town, since everybody fears Raghav Jindal.

== Cast ==
=== Main ===
- Amandeep Sidhu as Siya Jindal (née Sharma): Mrs. Sharma's eldest daughter, Tushar and Rashmi's sister, Khushi's aunt, Raghav's widow (2023-2024)
- Dheeraj Dhoopar as Raghav Jindal: Mrs. Jindal's son, Siya's husband (2023) (Dead)
- Karanvir Bohra as Viraj Dobriyal: A businessman-turned-social worker, Geeta's son, Jhanvi's ex-husband and murderer, Siya's well-wisher, Raghav's enemy, Unniyal's boss, Khushi's father (2023-2024)

=== Recurring ===
- Sneha Raikar as Mrs. Sharma: Siya, Tushar and Rashmi's mother, Khushi's maternal grandmother (2023-2024)
- Jatin Suri as Tushar Sharma: Mrs. Sharma's younger son, Siya and Rashmi's brother, Khushi's maternal uncle (2023-2024)
- Sheersha Tiwari as Rashmi Sharma: Youngest daughter of Mrs. Sharma, sister of Siya and Tushar, (2023-2024)
- Farida Dadi as Nilamma Sharma: Siya, Tushar and Rashmi's grandmother (2023-2024)
- Ram Mehar Jangra as Unniyal: Viraj's employee (2023-2024)
- Archana More as Mrs. Jindal: Raghav's mother (2023-2024)
- Angel Shetty as Khushi Dobriyal: Viraj's daughter (2023-2024)
- Rohit Roy as D.C.P. Avinash Saxena: Nandini's husband, Arjun's father (2023)
- Unknown as Dr. Nandini Saxena: Avinash's wife, Arjun's mother (2023)
- Unknown as Arjun Saxena: Avinash and Nandini's son (2023) (Dead)

== Production ==
The series was announced by Bombay Show Studios LLP on Star Bharat. Karanvir Bohra reprised his role as Viraj Dobriyal from the previous season, and was joined by Dheeraj Dhoopar and Amandeep Sidhu as Raghav and Siya respectively in lead roles. Principal photography commenced in August 2023 and was mainly shot at the Film City, Mumbai.

== See also ==
- List of programs broadcast by Star Bharat
