= Tere Mere Sapne (TV series) =

Indian drama series

- Promotional image
- Genre: Drama; Romance
- Created by: Sphere Origins
- Directed by: Ranjan Kumar Singh & Chetan Sharma & Suniil Raghuvansh
- Starring: See Below
- Country of origin: India
- Original language: Hindi
- No. of seasons: 3
- No. of episodes: 559 Total

Production
- Producers: Sunjoy Waddhwa & Comall Sunjoy Waddhwa
- Running time: 24 minutes
- Production company: Sphere Origins

Original release
- Network: Star Plus
- Release: 2 November 2009 – 16 December 2011

Tere Mere Sapne is an Indian television series that was broadcast on Star Plus from 4 November 2009, to 16 December 2011. The show was produced by Sphere Origins. It premiered during prime time, but was later shifted to afternoon slot due to low ratings.

Just after the show ended STAR Plus decided to end all the other shows in the afternoon slots.

== Plot ==
The show is the tale of Sarju who was married to Radha in his childhood. He loves his family and Radha immensely but when his friend Kalua is framed in a case in Mumbai, he goes to help him where he meets Kamya, who is a widow. She runs a magazine and hires Sarju for the same on the condition that he can't leave Mumbai and can't get married. Sarju lies that he is unmarried and Kamya frees Kalua who used to work in her office. Kalua warns Sarju about Kamya not being a nice person but Sarju sticks to his decision to work with her. Kalua informs Radha about it in the village and she runs away from home to go after her husband. Sarju tells Radha everything and asks her to hide their marriage. Radha agrees and tells the family that she has come to look for her husband. The family hires her as a maid. Slowly the truth of Radha being Sarju's wife gets exposed. In the meantime, Kamya has turned obsessive towards Sarju and tries everything to get close to him after she gets to know that Radha is his wife. Kamya's brother-in-law too enters the show midway and hates Sarju but later leaves. Driven by mad obsession, Kamya develops homicidal tendencies and kills Radha. But Radha is saved and returns as Sonia pretending to be a Radha look-alike. Kamya's truth is revealed with the help of Kamya's mother-in-law who doesn't like her. Kamya then frames Sarju of raping her. Radha succeeds in finding a good lawyer and wins the case. Kamya is sentenced to six years imprisonment and also has to pay 1 crore rupees to Radha and Sarju who return to their village.

In the village, Laachi (Sarju's sister-in-law, played by is taunted by her mother-in-law Ramdei for not giving an heir to the family. She gets her son, Kesoo remarried a girl, Kalki, who is already in love with someone else and is pregnant with his child. No one is aware of this. Much happens and Kalki, after giving birth to her child, runs away with the family's jewellery and money. The fact that Kesoo is impotent then comes to light and Kesoo decides to seek medical help but Ramdei is afraid that this news would spread in the village and bring shame to the family name. Kesoo goes ahead, anyway, even though they now have Kalki's child to use as cover. Sarju's aunt (chachi), with her daughter-in-law and son (Mrs. Hiraman, Phoolmani and Vishnu respectively) are also creating havoc in their lives. A girl named Rani who disguises herself as Meera (actually Vishnu's lover) enters the family's household and pursues Sarju. Ramdei is taken in with Meera and starts hating Radha as she feels Radha is the reason Kesoo went against her. Rani's truth is revealed and now Kalki returns. Sarju's cousin, Vishnu, mends his ways. Kalki sends Kesoo to jail by lying that his family and he tortured her for dowry. She behaves badly with everyone is the family. Ramdei slowly realizes how ideal her daughters-in-law - Radha and Laachi are.

Because everyone dislikes Kalki, they attempt to arrange for 8 lakh rupees to get her out of the house. However, they are unable to arrange the money and eventually everyone goes with Radha's plan to mortgage the house. Sarju and Radha talk and they get the divorce papers and affidavit to finalize the divorce of Kesoo & Kalki. Later on, they call Kalki and show her the money. Radha forces Kalki to sign the divorce papers, but Kalki rips the affidavit apart. Everyone is shocked. But the family has a second bag containing another set of 8 lakhs and the divorce papers and the affidavit. Kalki is "defeated", however, she wants to steal the baby so she persuades the family to let her stay the night and leave early morning. Laachi disapproves and insults her. Kalki gets tortured again by the family. Kalki successfully persuades Radha. At night, Kalki steals the baby from Laachi's room and Laachi wakes up shocked. Kesoo reassures her that it was just a dream and they go to sleep. The next morning, Kalki is out of sight and the baby is gone. Laachi is shocked and frantically searches for the baby. She fails and goes mad, then holds Radha responsible. Laachi then insults God, and tries to commit suicide by injecting herself with poison from a poisonous cactus plant. Luckily, she is saved, but has an illusion which she thinks is true. She sees the baby in her illusion but everyone else tells her there is no baby, and she goes mad again.

Sarju, Radha, and the others try to comfort Kesoo who feels responsible. Laachi loses her mental balance and is on medication. Mrs. Hiraman makes the situation worse by shouting at Laachi. Laachi is discharged from the hospital and everyone tells her that the baby is back. However, it's just a doll that Sarju bought from the shop. Laachi thinks it's her baby and treats it accordingly. Meanwhile, Mrs. Hiraman and Phoolmani resume their tricks. At night, Mrs. Hiraman steals Sarju's phone and calls her son, Gopal. Radha goes searching for his phone but then Vishnu takes it off them and saves them, though he is annoyed with their behaviour. Radha retrieves the phone from the living room. Sarju is suspicious when he sees the name Gopal on his contact list. Radha then knows that it was Mrs. Hiraman and Phoolmani. The next morning, Kesoo tells Radha that there is no cure for Laachi. He tells Radha to expose the truth. Phoolmani goes into Laachi's room and tells her that her so-called "baby" is a lifeless doll. Laachi takes it seriously and tells Phoolmani that she will kill her if she says one more thing about her "baby." Phoolmani is scared. Then Laachi gets better and gets pregnant and Kamya comes back for revenge on Radha so she can get her love back. So she plans to make much trouble for Radha. Then Radha goes to jail for killing Gurumata (Kamya), so Sarju gets her out; then Gurumata throws her out but then she stays and exposes Kamya. Ramdei throws Kamya out of the house. Radha is pregnant and Mrs. Hiraman and Phoolmani apologise to Radha.

== Cast ==
Character	Played by
Radha	Ekta Tiwari
Sarju	Saurabh Pandey / Yash Pandit
Kamya Oberoi	Parull Chaudhry
Manager	Sharhaan Singh
Maaji	Sulakshana Khatri
Shambhu	Gyan Prakash
Kesoo	Chandresh Singh
Jamuna	Anima Pagare
Lachi	Payal Singh
Ishwar	Amit Kumar Sharma
Meera / Rani	Paridhi Sharma
Kalki	Neha Gosain
Hiraman Chacha	Ram Awana
Akshay	Kartik Sabharwal
Meethi	Jalina Thakur
Mukta	Surekha Sikri
Lakha	Rammehar Jangra
