= Saurabh Pandey =

Indian Television and Bollywood actor (born 1988)

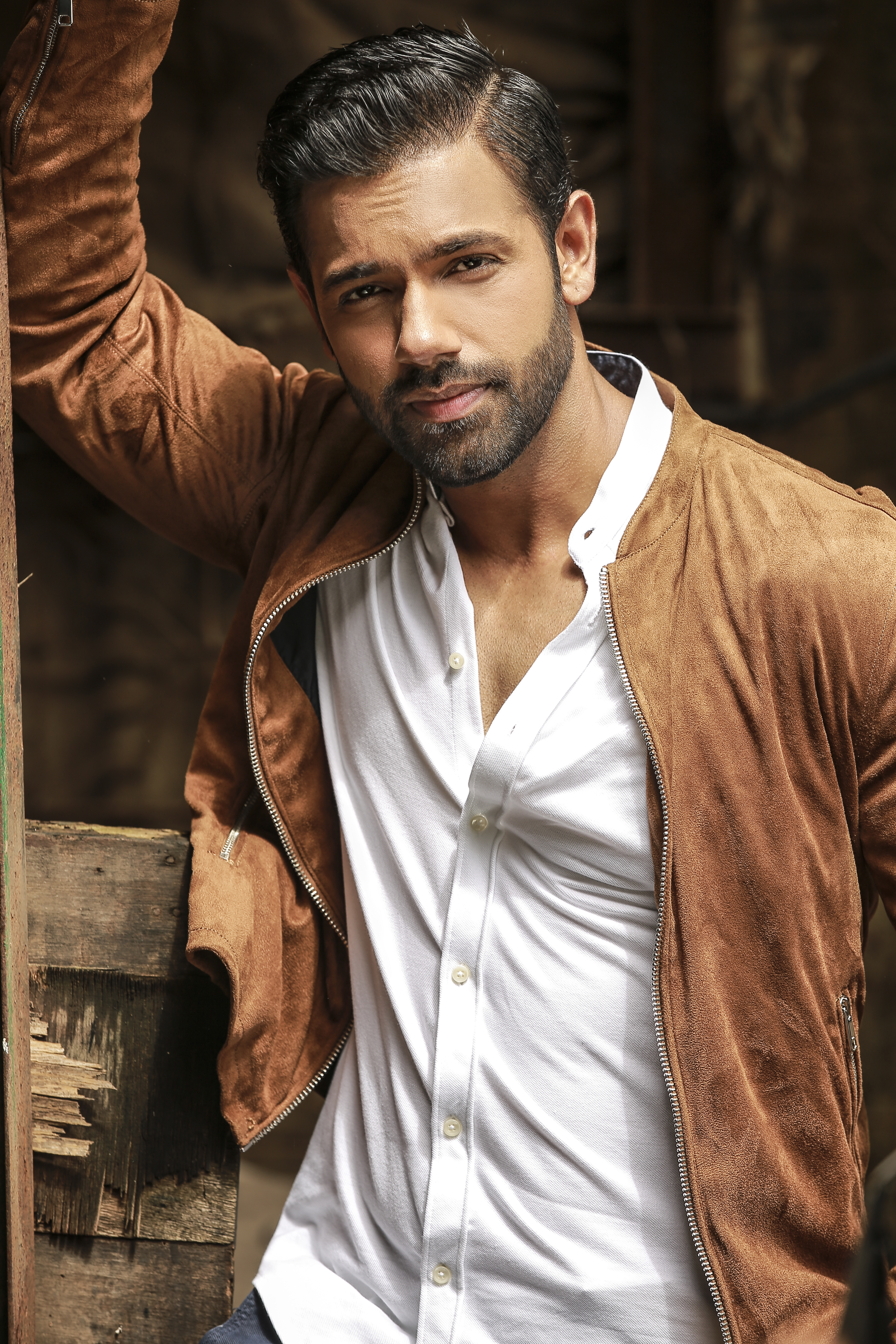
- Pandey in 2018
- Born: 11 May 1988 (age 37); New Delhi, India
- Occupations: Actor; Film producer
- Years active: 2005–2016
- Spouse: Zara Barring (m. 2017)
- Relatives: Gaurav Pandey (Brother); Neha Pandey (Sister)

Saurabh Pandey (born 11 May 1988) is an Indian Television and Bollywood actor. Famously known for his portrayal as Lord Krishna in Suryaputra Karn on Sony Entertainment Television. His debut TV show as lead was Siddharth Basu's first Fiction TV show Jiya Jale for 9X TV in (2007). He later played the role of Shaurya in his second TV show titled Shaurya Aur Suhani for Star Plus channel. He also played the role of protagonist in shows like Tere Mere Sapne, Ganga Kii Dheej and Razia Sultan.

== Early life and education ==
Saurabh Pandey was born in New Delhi, India to Hindu Brahmin parents. He started his education at St. Mark's Senior Secondary School, Janakpuri. Saurabh furthered his education in Mussoorie where he studied at Mussoorie Modern School for six months and then later went on to complete his education at SelaQui International School, Dehradun.

== Career ==
Saurabh got his first TV show with Siddharth Basu's Big Synergy, titled Jiya Jale. The show aired on 9X channel. Jiya Jale was Big Synergy's first fiction TV show. Saurabh played the main lead role of Chandan Bhamani. He then acted in another show Angad, which was originally supposed to be aired on 9X TV but due to the winding up of ANGAD TV, the show was re-launched by Star Plus. as Shaurya Aur Suhani. The romantic action based fantasy drama was produced by Sunjoy Wadhwa's Sphere Origins. Saurabh played the title role of super hero Shaurya.

A show by Star Plus channel in September 2009, titled Tere Mere Sapne and produced by Sunjoy Wadhwa's Sphere Origins was Saurabh's next show. Saurabh played the role of the protagonist, Sarju, a simple boy from a small village living his life in a big metropolitan city like Mumbai. In the year 2011, Saurabh appeared in a TV show titled Ganga Kii Dheej. This was a joint venture of Harry Baweja's Baweja Movies and Flying turtle Films. The show aired on Sahara One, and Saurabh played the role of Shivom.

After four years of gap in his acting career. In August 2015 Saurabh got back to his acting career and was seen on &TV's historical TV show Razia Sultan playing the role of Jamal-Ud-Din-Yakut. Immediately after the ending of his show Razia Sultan in November 2015, he was offered the role of Lord Krishna in Suryaputra Karn on Sony TV by the same production house "Swastik Pictures", who produced the TV show Razia Sultan.

== Personal life ==
Saurabh is the eldest among 3 siblings and was in a relationship with Indo-Canadian model and actress Zara Barring. After a 10 years of long term relationship with Zara Barring, both got married on 28 November 2017 in Juhu ISKCON temple Mumbai His brother Gaurav Pandey is also an actor and made his debut in Hindi film Humpty Sharma Ki Dulhania as Shaunty.

== Filmography ==
=== As actor – TV shows ===
Year	TV Show name	Role	Channel
2007–2008	Jiya Jale	Chandan	9X
2009	Shaurya Aur Suhani	Shaurya	Star Plus
2010	Tere Mere Sapne	Sarju	Star Plus
2010	Aahat	Rajiv	Sony TV
2011	Ganga Kii Dheej	Shivom	Sahara One
2015	Code Red Talash (Episode 171)	Munna Yadav	Life OK
2015	Razia Sultan	Jamal-Ud-Din Yakut	&TV
2015-16	Suryaputra Karn	Lord Krishna/Paundraka Vasudeva	Sony TV

=== Films ===
Year	Film	Director	Producer	ScreenWriter	Film Editor	DOP	Notes
2012	The Essence of Mumbai	No	Yes	No	Yes	No	Short film
2013	International Kirtan Fest 2013	Yes	Yes	No	Yes	Yes	Event film
2013	Salah – The Prayer	No	Yes	No	No	No	Short film
2014	Tujh Se Hee Raabta	No	Yes	No	Yes	No	Television Film

=== Music videos ===
Year	Music Video	Director	Producer	Film Editor	DOP	Music label	Notes
2014	Tenu Vekh Ke	Yes	Yes	Yes	No	T-Series	
2014	Bismillah Karaan – Acoustic	Yes	Yes	Yes	Yes	Junglee Talkies & Tumbi Records	Digital partner Times music
2015	Rishtey (Theme song of Mafatlal Industries)	No	Yes	Yes	No	Mafatlal Industries Ltd	A Musical Ad

== See also ==
- Cinema of India
- Bollywood
