= Karanvir Bohra =

Indian actor, producer, designer

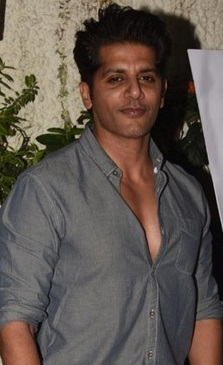
- Bohra in 2019
- Born: Manoj Bohra; 28 August 1982 (age 44); Jodhpur, Rajasthan, India
- Citizenship: Indian
- Education: Sydenham college
- Occupations: Actor; producer; designer
- Years active: 1990; 1999–present
- Known for: Shararat; Kasautii Zindagii Kay; Dil Se Di Dua... Saubhagyavati Bhava?; Qubool Hai; Naagin 2; Bigg Boss 12
- Height: 1.7 m (5 ft 7 in)
- Spouse: Teejay Sidhu (m. 2006)
- Children: 3
- Family: Bohra family

Signature
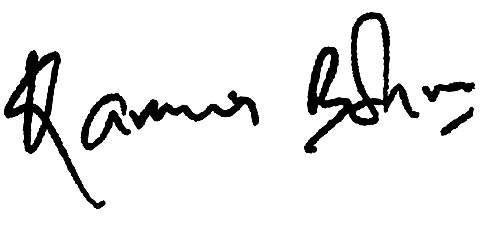

Manoj Bohra (born 28 August 1982), is better known by his stage name Karanvir Bohra, is an Indian television and film actor, producer and designer. In the year 2007, Bohra changed his name from Manoj to Karanveer.

He is recognised for his roles in TV shows like Kasautii Zindagii Kay, Dil Se Di Dua... Saubhagyavati Bhava?, Shararat, Just Mohabbat, Naagin 2, Qubool Hai. Karanvir has also appeared in films such as Kismat Konnection, Mumbai 125 KM, Love Yoou Soniye, and Hume Tumse Pyaar Kitna. Additionally he has participated in several reality shows including Nach Baliye 4, Jhalak Dikhhla Jaa 5, Fear Factor: Khatron Ke Khiladi 5 and Bigg Boss 12.

== Early life and education ==
Bohra was born on 28 August 1982 in Jodhpur, Rajasthan. He is the son of filmmaker Mahendra Bohra and the grandson of actor-producer Ramkumar Bohra. Producer Sunil Bohra is his first cousin. He has one older sister, Meenakshi Bohra Vyas. He attended G D Somani Memorial School in Cuffe Parade. As a child, he was not academically inclined, nor was he good at sports. He attended junior college at Elphinstone College in Mumbai, studying science, but he left the school in twelfth grade. Later, he was admitted to Sydenham College in Churchgate, where he received a Bachelor of Commerce degree. Bohra received training in the Kathak dance style for two years under Pandit Veeru Krishnan.

== Personal life ==
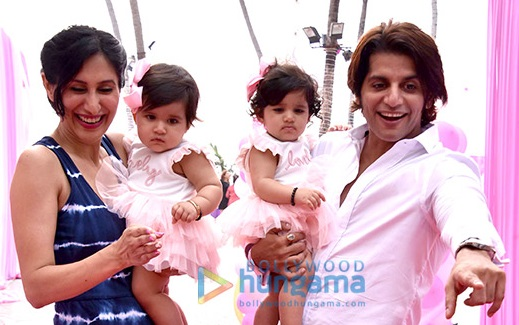
Karanvir and wife Teejay with their twin daughters in 2017.

Bohra is married to model and VJ Teejay Sidhu His marriage took place at Sri Sri Ravishankar Ashram in Bengaluru on 3 November 2006. The couple have three daughters. Earlier Bohra and his wife lived at Lokhandwala in Andheri, Mumbai, and in 2014, he moved to Goregaon, a locality in the Mumbai Suburban district. Bohra is enthusiastic about cleanliness and meditation.

== Career ==
=== Debut And Early Breakthrough and success in Television (1990; 1999–2008) ===
Bohra's first acting role was as a child artist in Tejaa (1990). Bohra made his television debut with the role of Kabir in DJ's a Creative Unit's Just Mohabbat. Later, he worked as an assistant to B. P. Singh on the detective series C.I.D, followed by Achanak 37 Saal Baad. He had his first leading role with Ronnie Screwvala's Shararat, a comedy fantasy show where he played Dhruv. Bohra also played minor parts in Kyunki Saas Bhi Kabhi Bahu Thi (2007) and Kkusum (2008). In 2005, he joined the cast of the popular show Kasautii Zindagii Kay. He played the character of Prem Basu/Yudi, a spoilt brat opposite Tina Parekh. After being a part of the show for more than two years, he decided to quit it to pursue his Bollywood career. In 2008, Bohra hosted Ek Se Badhkar Ek with Tina Parekh. In the same year, Bohra participated in dance reality shows Nach Baliye 4 with his wife Teejay Sidhu, and in Kabhi Kabhii Pyaar Kabhi Kabhii Yaar with his wife and Tina Parekh.

=== Bollywood Debut, Television Comeback and Success as an Antagonist (2008–2012) ===
In 2008, Bohra had a cameo role in Aziz Mirza's film Kismat Konnection, playing the character of Dave Kataria, a businessman with a bratty attitude. Taran Adarsh of Bollywood Hungama wrote of his performance, "Bohra acts well". In 2011, Bohra made his comeback to television with Dil Se Di Dua... Saubhagyavati Bhava? He played the role of Viraj Dobriyal, a psychotic lover who has mood swings and suffers from cleanliness-focused obsessive–compulsive disorder. His character was described by The Indian express as "perhaps the most popular baddie on television".The show was no 1 on life ok channel.

=== Regional Debut And Expansion to Production (2013–2014) ===
In 2013, Bohra made his debut in regional Punjabi film, Love Yoou Soniye, with his wife Teejay Sidhu. Bohra and Sidhu themselves produced the film. In 2013, he acted in Telugu director Hemant Madhukar's Hindi film Mumbai 125 KM alongside Veena Malik and Vedita Pratap Singh. The film grossed ₹1.65 crore (US$170,000) domestically. In June 2012, he launched his own line of men's clothing, Pegasus, in association with fashion designer Ammy Billmoria. In March 2014, Bohra and his wife participated in Fear Factor: Khatron Ke Khiladi 5. In 2014, he replaced Abhay Deol as the host of the Balaji Telefilms documentary show Gumrah: End of Innocence 4 for season 4. However, Bohra quit the show in May 2015, as the producers faced a financial crunch and were asking to reduce his salary.

=== Further Success In Television (2014–2017) ===
In April 2014, Bohra performed in Zee TV's Qubool Hai opposite Surbhi Jyoti. He played Aahil Raza Ibrahim, a snobbish, unpredictable, volatile, rebel biker with a dry sense of humour. In December 2014, Shruti Jambhekar writing for The Times of India of India stated that "Karanvir Bohra and Surbhi Jyoti as Aahil and Sanam in the post leap version of Qubool Hai had managed to save their show from getting the axe earlier in the year 2014. The couple have an "impressive fan following" on social networking sites. In October 2014, the show ranked 9th on the list of top 10 shows on Indian Television. In December 2014, The Times Of India reported Sanam and Aahil(Saahil) to be "hit with the viewers. In May 2015, Gayatri Kolwankar writing for The Times of India stated that Surbhi Jyoti has been the face of 'Qubool Hai' since its inception and the show is popular, and that "Surbhi and Karanvir make an ideal pair on-screen". At 2015 Zee Gold Awards, the couple were titled as the Best Onscreen Jodi. Neha Maheshwri, writing for The Times of India in July 2014, stated that the show "has failed to impress the audience. In May 2015, Zehra Kazmi writing for Hindustan Times stated that the show should end as it has nothing new to offer, which is evident with the dip of TRPS. In March 2015, when news of Karanvir Bohra quitting the show were out, fans had set up an online petition to reunite Sanam and Aahil in the show.

In March 2015, he decided to leave the show, saying that taking his character further would just be stretching it. Later, he decided to return to the show. He quit the show once again in July 2015, as the production house were planning a 20-year leap of the show's storyline. Qubool Hai ended in January 2016.

In October 2016, he joined the cast of Naagin 2 as Rocky Pratap Singh, opposite Mouni Roy and Adaa Khan. The show received high TRPs and ended in June 2017. He also hosted the reality television show India's Best Judwaah on Zee TV the same year.

=== Bigg Boss and Hume Tumse Pyaar Kitna (2018–2019) ===
Bohra was a celebrity contestant in Bigg Boss 12, the Indian version of the reality TV show Big Brother. He entered the house on 16 September 2018, and was eliminated in fifth place on 30 December.

In July 2019, Bohra starred alongside Priya Banerjee and Samir Kochhar in the romantic thriller film Hume Tumse Pyaar Kitna, which was produced by his father Mahendra Bohra. Upon its release, the film received mixed reviews from critics, with praise towards Bohra's performance. However, it turned out to be a massive financial failure putting Bohra in massive debt.

=== OTT Debut, Lock Upp and Negative Roles (2020–2024) ===
In January 2020, Bohra announced that he was set to make his digital debut with Zee5's thriller web series The Casino. The show was released during the COVID-19 lockdown in India. He played the role of Vikramaditya Marwah, aka Vicky, who is the heir to his father's successful business but falls into the trap of his father's mistress. Bohra also served as a co-producer on the show. Upon its release, the show generally received negative reviews from critics and mixed responses from audience. Later that year, he appeared in another Zee5 web series Bhanwar, alongside his wife and his Hume Tumse Pyaar Kitna co-star Priya Banerjee. He made his directorial debut with this show. The show was based on time travel and was much better received than his previous show.

In February 2022, he entered the web reality show Lock Upp as a contestant. During the show, he made some shocking revelations regarding his personal and professional life. He was eliminated from the show on Day 52.

In May 2023, Bohra made his comeback to fiction television playing the negative lead role of Samar Ahluwalia Barot in Hum Rahe Na Rahe Hum. Later the same year, he reprised his iconic role of Viraj Dobriyal in Saubhagyavati Bhava: * Niyam Aur Shartein Laagu. In 2024, he played finite negative roles in television shows Ghum Hai Kisikey Pyaar Meiin and Shiv Shakti - Tap Tyaag Taandav. He also appeared in numerous music videos in this time period.

=== Further Career (2025–present) ===
In March 2025, he appeared in Hungama's mystery thriller web series Khadaan where he portrayed the character of Mahipal. In July 2025, he joined the cast of Sony TV's horror show Aami Dakini as Professor D.D. Kalkarni. Bohra also appeared in numerous micro drama series in this period.

== Filmography ==
Year	Title	Role	Ref(s)
1990	Tejaa	Young Tejaa	
2006	Yabardaasti Kyon Kar De O Ji?	Shashmit Mukabara	
2008	Kismat Konnection	Dave Kataria	
2013	Love Yoou Soniye	Karanvir Singh Gill	
2014	Mumbai 125 KM	Prem	
2017	Patel Ki Punjabi Shaadi	Pat Singh/Pankaj Patel	
2019	Hume Tumse Pyaar Kitna	Dhruv Mittal	
2021	Kutub Minar: The Eighth Wonder	Satyavan Sharma	

=== Television ===
Year	Title	Role	Notes	Ref(s)
1999–2000	Just Mohabbat	Kabir	Debut Show	
2000	C.I.D	Assistant Director		
2000	Achanak 37 Saal Baad	Assistant Director		
2002	Kyunki Saas Bhi Kabhi Bahu Thi	Tushar Mehta		
2001-2002	Ssshhhh...koi Hai	Neeraj		
2002–2003	Kya Hadsaa Kya Haqeeqat	Rohan		
2003–2005	Kkusum	Nakul Oberoi		
2003–2006	Shararat	Dhruv	Main Lead	
2005–2007	Kasautii Zindagii Kay	Prem Basu/Yudi	Negative Lead	
2006	Ek Se Badhkar Ek	Host		
2006	Piya Kay Ghar Jaana Hai	Altaaf		
2008	Nach Baliye 4	Contestant		
2008	Mr. & Ms. TV	Contestant		
2008	Kabhi Kabhii Pyaar Kabhi Kabhii Yaar	Contestant		
2011–2013	Dil Se Di Dua... Saubhagyavati Bhava?	Viraj Dobriyal	Negative Lead	
2012	Jhalak Dikhhla Jaa 5	Himself	Guest	
2013	Sapne Suhane Ladakpan Ke	Himself		
2013	Welcome – Baazi Mehmaan Nawazi Ki	Contestant		
2013	Jhalak Dikhhla Jaa 6	Contestant	8th place	
2014	Fear Factor: Khatron Ke Khiladi 5	Contestant	6th place	
2014	Gumrah: End of Innocence 4	Host		
2014	Yeh Hai Aashiqui	Rohan		
2014–2015	Qubool Hai	Aahil Raza Ibrahim	Main Lead	
2015	Farah ki Dawat	Guest		
2014	Jamai Raja	Aahil Raza Ibrahim	Guest	
2015	Kumkum Bhagya	Aahil Raza Ibrahim	Guest	
2015	Nach Baliye 7	Himself	Guest	
2016	Bahu Hamari Rajni Kant	Himself	Guest	
2016	Box Cricket League 2	Contestant		
2016	Bigg Boss 10	Himself	Guest	
2016–2017	Naagin 2	Rocky Pratapsingh	Main Lead	
2017	India's Best Judwaah	Host		
2017	Bigg Boss 11	Guest	Himself	
2018	Juzzbaat	Guest	Himself	
2018	Bigg Boss 12	Contestant	4th runner up	
2019	Kitchen Champion 5	Himself	Guest	
2019	Naagin 3	Rocky Pratapsingh	Guest	
2019	Khatra Khatra Khatra	Himself		
2019	MTV Ace Of Space 2	Himself		
2019	Bigg Boss 13	Himself	Guest	
2023	Hum Rahe Na Rahe Hum	Samar Ahluwalia Barot	Negative Lead	
2023–2024	Saubhagyavati Bhava: Niyam Aur Shartein Laagu	Viraj Dobriyal	Negative Lead	
2024	Ghum Hai Kisikey Pyaar Meiin	Inspector Bhanwar Patil	Finite Negative Role	
2024	Shiv Shakti – Tap Tyaag Tandav	Andhaka	Finite Negative Role	
2025	Aami Dakini	Professor D.D. Kalkarni	Finite Negative Role	

=== Music Videos ===
Year	Title	Singer(s)	Ref.
2020	Changing for Good	Shafaat Ali, Daniya Ali	
2023	Jeet Ki Zubaan	Romy, Harmaan Nazim	
2023	Sara Sehar	Afsana Khan	
2024	Jhooti Mohabbat	Altamash Faridi	
2024	Zindagi	Ahaan	
2025	Riddhi Siddhi Ke Deva	Hashar Sharma	

=== Web series ===
Year	Title	Role	Platform	Ref(s)
2020	Bhanwar	Ranvir Makhija	Zee5	
2020	The Casino	Vikramaditya (Vicky) Marwah	Zee5	
2022	Lock Upp 1	Contestant	AltBalaji	9th place
2024	Ek Ladki Ko Dekha To	Rohit Marwah	PocketFM	Season 2
2025	Khadaan	Mahipal	Hungama	

== Awards ==
Year	Award	Category	Work	Result	Reference
2006	Indian Telly Awards	Best Actor in a Negative Role	Kasautii Zindagii Kay	Won	
2012	Indian Telly Awards	Best Actor in a Negative Role	Dil Se Di Dua... Saubhagyavati Bhava?	Won	
2012	Indian Television Academy Awards	Best Actor in a Negative Role	Dil Se Di Dua... Saubhagyavati Bhava?	Won	
2012	Gold awards	Best Actor In a Negative Role	Dil Se Di Dua... Saubhagyavati Bhava?	Won	
2014	Zee Rishtey Awards	Favourite jodi	Qubool hai	Nominated	
2014	Zee Rishtey Awards	Favourite Nayi Jodi	Qubool hai	Nominated	
2014	Zee Rishtey Awards	Favorite popular Face	Qubool Hai	Nominated	
2015	Gold Awards	Best Onscreen Jodi (along Surbhi Jyoti)	Qubool Hai	Won	
2017	Gold Awards	Best Actor (Critics)	Naagin 2	Won	
2017	Zee Rishtey Awards	Social Swagger of the Year	—N/a	Won	
2017	Boroplus Gold Awards	Best Actor	Naagin 2	Nominated	
