= List of awards and nominations received by Ronit Roy =

Ronit Roy awards and nominations
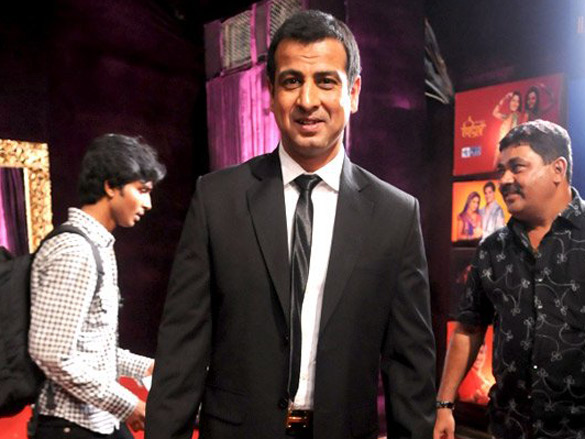
- Roy in 2010
Awards and nominations
Award	Wins	Nominations
Filmfare Awards	1	2
ITA Awards	5	5
Indian Telly Awards	6	7
Screen Awards	2	0
IIFA Awards	0	2
Zee Cine Awards	1	1
Apsara Awards	2	3
Stardust Awards	0	2
Gold Awards	2	4
IReel Awards	0	1
Kalakar Awards	2	0
BIG Television Awards	1	0
Other awards	4	0

Totals (Note: Certain award groups do not simply award one winner. They acknowledge several different recipients, have runners-up, and have third place. Since this is a specific recognition and is different from losing an award, runner-up mentions are considered wins in this award tally. For simplification and to avoid errors, each award in this list has been presumed to have had a prior nomination.)
- Wins: 26
- Nominations: 26

Ronit Roy is an Indian actor who works in several Indian TV shows and movies. He won the Best Actor in a Negative Role Awards at Star Screen Awards and Zee Cine Awards for his role of an oppressive father in the movie Udaan (2010). He also won the Filmfare Award for Best Supporting Actor for the same.

Roy is one of the most decorated Indian television actors. He has received numerous awards for his performance in shows like Kasautii Zindagii Kay, Kyunki Saas Bhi Kabhi Bahu Thi, Bandini, Adaalat etc.

== Apsara Awards ==
Year	Category	Show/Film	Results	Ref.
2006	Best Actor in a Drama Series	Kyunki Saas Bhi Kabhi Bahu Thi	Nominated	
2011	Best Actor in a Drama Series	Bandini	Nominated	
2011	Best Actor in a Negative Role	Udaan	Nominated	
2015	Best Actor in a Drama Series	Itna Karo Na Mujhe Pyaar	Won	

== BIG Television Awards ==
Year	Category	Show/Film	Results	Ref.
2011	Veer Character - Male (Fiction)	Adaalat	Won	
2011	Yadgaar Negative Role Character - Male	Kasautii Zindagii Kay	Won	

== Filmfare Awards ==
Year	Category	Show/Film	Result	Ref.
2011	Best Supporting Actor	Udaan	Won	
2015	Best Supporting Actor	2 States	Nominated	

== IIFA Awards ==
Year	Category	Show/Film	Result	Ref.
2011	Best Performance in a Negative Role	Udaan	Nominated	
2015	Best Supporting Actor	2 States	Nominated	

== Indian Television Academy Awards ==
Year	Category	Show/Film	Results	Ref.
2003	Best Actor (Popular)	Kyunki Saas Bhi Kabhi Bahu Thi	Won	
2004	Best Actor (Popular)	Kyunki Saas Bhi Kabhi Bahu Thi	Won	
2005	Best Actor (Popular)	Kyunki Saas Bhi Kabhi Bahu Thi	Nominated	
2009	Best Actor - Drama	Bandini	Won	
2010	Best Actor - Drama	Bandini	Nominated	
2010	ITA Milestone Award	Kyunki Saas Bhi Kabhi Bahu Thi	Won	
2011	Best Actor Popular	Bandini	Nominated	
2011	Best Actor - Drama	Adaalat	Nominated	
2016	Best Actor - Drama	Adaalat (season 2)	Nominated	
2016	Special Award (with Rohit Roy)	Kyunki Saas Bhi Kabhi Bahu Thi; Adaalat	Won	

== Indian Telly Awards ==
Year	Category	Show/Film	Results	Ref.
2003	Best Actor in a Lead Role	Kyunki Saas Bhi Kabhi Bahu Thi	Nominated	
2004	Best Supporting Actor	Kyunki Saas Bhi Kabhi Bahu Thi	Nominated	
2004	Best Supporting Actor	Kasautii Zindagii Kay	Won	
2005	Best Father	Kasautii Zindagii Kay	Nominated	
2005	Best Actor in a Negative Role	Kasautii Zindagii Kay	Nominated	
2006	Best Actor in a Negative Role	Kasautii Zindagii Kay	Nominated	
2006	Best TV Personality	—N/a	Won	
2007	Best Actor in a Negative Role	Kasamh Se	Won	
2009	Best Actor in a Lead Role	Bandini	Won	
2010	Best Actor of the Decade	Kasautii Zindagii Kay	Won	
2012	Best TV Personality	—N/a	Won	
2012	Best Actor in a Lead Role	Adaalat	Nominated	
2015	Best Actor in a Lead Role	Itna Karo Na Mujhe Pyaar	Nominated	

== iReel Awards ==
Year	Category	Nominated work	Result
2019	Best Actor (Drama)	Hostages	Nominated

== Kalakar Awards ==
Year	Category	Show/Film	Results	Ref.
2003	Best TV Actor	Kyunki Saas Bhi Kabhi Bahu Thi	Won	

== Screen Awards ==
Year	Category	Show/Film	Results	Ref.
2011	Best Villain	Udaan	Won	
2016	Best Villain	Guddu Rangeela	Won	

== Stardust Awards ==
Year	Category	Show/Film	Results	Ref.
2015	Best Supporting Actor	2 States	Nominated	
2016	Best Actor in a Negative Role	Guddu Rangeela	Nominated	

== Zee Cine Awards ==
Year	Category	Show/Film	Results	Ref.
2011	Best Performance in a Negative Role	Udaan	Won	
2018	Best Performance in a Negative Role	Kaabil	Nominated	

== Gold Awards ==
Year	Category	Show/Film	Results	Ref.
2010	Best Actor in a Lead Role (Jury)	Bandini	Won	
2010	Best Actor in a Lead Role	Bandini	Nominated	
2011	Best Actor in a Lead Role	Bandini	Nominated	
2011	Stellar Performance of The Year (Male)	Adaalat	Won	
2012	Best Actor in a Lead Role	Adaalat	Nominated	
2015	Best Actor in a Lead Role	Itna Karo Na Mujhe Pyaar	Nominated	
2019	Best Actor (OTT)	Hostages	Won	

== Other awards ==
- 2018: HT India's Most Stylish TV Personality (Male)
