= Producers Guild Film Award for Best Actor in a Drama Series =

Annual Indian film award

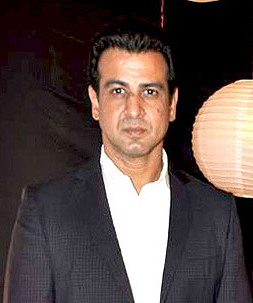
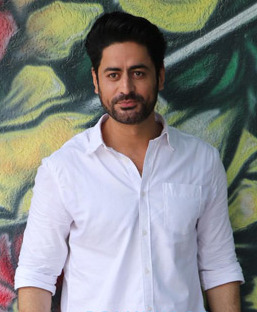
- The 2015 Recipient: Ronit Roy & Mohit Raina
- Awarded for: Best Performance by an Actor in a Lead Role on Television
- Sponsored by: Film & Television Producers Guild (Mumbai, India)
- First award: 2004
- Final award: 2015

Highlights
- Total awarded: 7
- First winner: Ronit Roy, for Kasautii Zindagii Kay (2004)
- Last winner: Ronit Roy, for Itna Karo Na Mujhe Pyaar & Mohit Raina for Devon Ke Dev...Mahadev (2015)

Producers Guild Film Award for Best Actor in a Drama Series is an award given by Apsara Producers Guild to recognize excellence in film and television, to recognize a male actor in television drama series who has delivered an outstanding performance in a leading role.

The award was first awarded in 2004 under the title Best Actor in a Drama Series and is awarded every year annually thereafter.

== Winners ==
Year	Result	Actor	Role	Show
2004
2004	Winner	Ronit Roy	Rishabh Bajaj	Kasautii Zindagii Kay
2004	Nominated	Pankaj Kapoor	Mussadi Lal	Office Office
2004	Nominated	Manoj Joshi	Mayor Sahab	Kehta Hai Dil
2004	Nominated	Mohnish Behl	Vikram	Devi
2005	Not Held			
2006
2006	Winner	Varun Badola	Abhimanyu Saxena	Astitva...Ek Prem Kahani
2006	Nominated	Pawan Shankar	Siddhanth	Siddhanth
2006	Nominated	Apoorva Agnihotri	Armaan Suri	Jassi Jaissi Koi Nahin
2006	Nominated	Ronit Roy	Mihir Virani	Kyunki Saas Bhi Kabhi Bahu Thi
2006	Nominated	Sudhir Pandey	Tribhuvandas Pandey	Kareena Kareena
2007	Not Held			
2008	Nominated	Rajat Tokas	Prithviraj Chauhan	Dharti Ka Veer Yodha Prithviraj Chauhan
2008	Nominated	Sharad Malhotra	Sagar Pratap Singh	Banoo Main Teri Dulhann
2008	Nominated	Deven Bhojani	Gattu Thakkar	Baa Bahoo Aur Baby
2008	Nominated	Alok Nath	Babuji	Sapna Babul Ka...Bidaai
2008	Nominated	Sushant Singh	Sushant Sharma	Virrudh
2009	N/A			
2010
2010	Winner	Ayub Khan	Jogi Thakur	Uttaran
2010	Nominated	Harsh Chhaya	Karan Singh	Ladies Special
2010	Nominated	Dilip Joshi	Jethalal Gada	Taarak Mehta Ka Ooltah Chashmah
2010	Nominated	Angad Hasija	Alekh Rajvansh	Sapna Babul Ka...Bidaai
2010	Nominated	Sudesh Berry	Loha Singh	Agle Janam Mohe Bitiya Hi Kijo
2011	Nominated			
2011	Winner	Dilip Joshi	Jethalal Gada	Taarak Mehta Ka Ooltah Chashmah
2011	Nominated	Sushant Singh Rajput	Manav Deshmukh	Pavitra Rishta
2011	Nominated	Barun Sobti	Shravan Jaiswal	Baat Hamari Pakki Hai
2011	Nominated	Ronit Roy	Dharamraj Mahyavanshi	Bandini
2011	Nominated	Kanwaljit Singh	Kuku Narang	Sabki Laadli Bebo
2012
2012	Winner	Manish Wadhwa	Chanakya	Chandragupta Maurya
2012	Nominated	Ram Kapoor	Ram Kapoor	Bade Achhe Lagte Hain
2012	Nominated	Daya Shankar Pandey	Shani Dev	Mahima Shani Dev Ki
2012	Nominated	Vivek Mushran	Lucky Singh Ahluwalia	Parvarrish – Kuchh Khattee Kuchh Meethi
2012	Nominated	Shoaib Ibrahim	Prem Bhardwaj	Sasural Simar Ka
2013
2013	Winner	Ram Kapoor	Ram Kapoor	Bade Achhe Lagte Hain
2013	Nominated	Hiten Tejwani	Manav Deshmukh	Pavitra Rishta
2013	Nominated	Samir Soni	Kunal Chopra	Parichay – Nayee Zindagi Kay Sapno Ka
2013	Nominated	Sidharth Shukla	Shivraj Shekhar	Balika Vadhu
2013	Nominated	Shoaib Ibrahim	Prem Bhardwaj	Sasural Simar Ka
2014
2014	Winner	Rajat Tokas	Akbar	Jodha Akbar
2014	Nominated	Karan Patel	Raman Bhalla	Ye Hai Mohabbatein
2014	Nominated	Mohit Raina	Mahadev	Devon Ke Dev...Mahadev
2014	Nominated	Shabbir Ahluwalia	Rockstar Abhi	Kumkum Bhagya
2014	Nominated	Anil Kapoor	Jai Singh Rathore	24
2015
2015	Winner	Ronit Roy Mohit Raina	Neil Khanna Lord Shiva	Itna Karo Na Mujhe Pyaar Devon Ke Dev...Mahadev
