= Gold Award for Best Actor in a Lead Role =

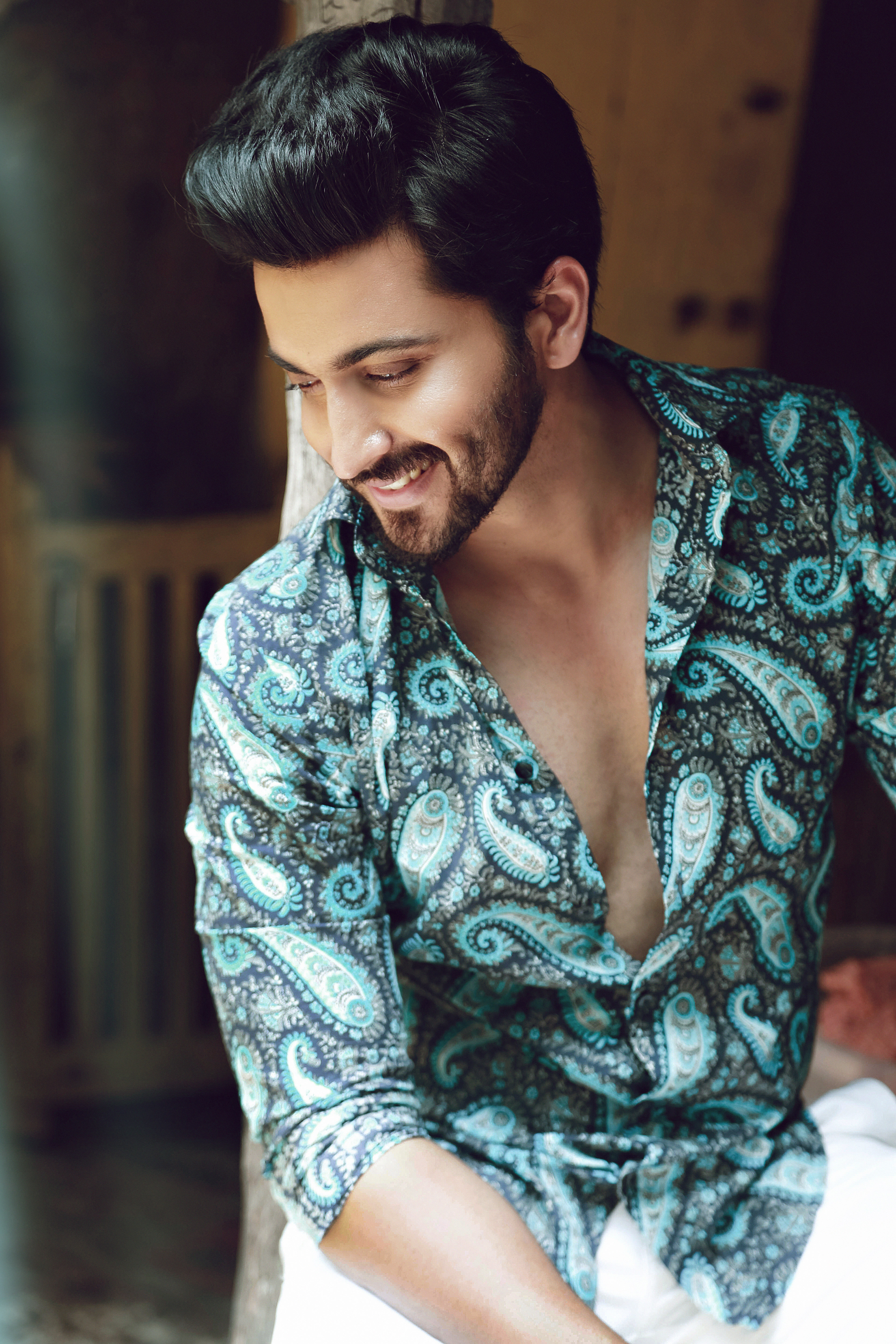
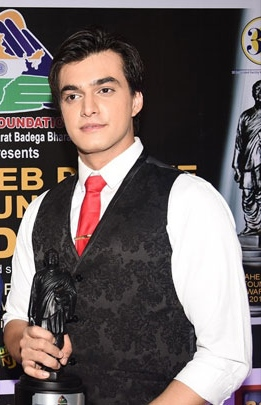
- The 2019 recipients: Dheeraj Dhoopar and Mohsin Khan
- Awarded for: Best Performance by a Male Actor in a Lead Role on Television
- Country: India
- Presented by: White Leaf Entertainment
- First award: 2007
- Currently held by: Dheeraj Dhoopar for Kundali Bhagya; Mohsin Khan for Yeh Rishta Kya Kehlata Hai
- Website: Gold Awards

Gold Award for Best Actor in a Lead Role Male is an award given as part of its annual Gold Awards to recognise a male actor who has delivered an outstanding performance in a leading role on Hindi television. The award is voted for by the fans.

== Superlatives ==
Superlative	Name	Times
Actor with most awards	Karan Patel	4
Actor with most nominations	Ronit Roy	8
Actor with most nominations (without ever winning)	Karan Mehra	5

== Winners and nominees ==
=== 2000s ===
Year	Photo	Actor	Character	Show	Ref
2007		Rajeev Khandelwal	Rajveer Singh Shekhawat	Left Right Left	
2007		Ram Kapoor	Jai Walia	Kasamh Se	
2007		Rohit Roy	Rahul Lamba	Viraasat	
2007		Shabir Ahluwalia	Milind Mishra	Kayamath	
2007		Sharad Malhotra	Sagar Pratap Singh	Banoo Main Teri Dulhann	
2007		Sushant Singh	Susant Sharma	Virrudh	
2008		Shabir Ahluwalia	Milind Mishra	Kayamath	
2008		Sharad Malhotra	Sagar Pratap Singh	Banoo Main Teri Dulhann	
2008		Angad Hasija	Alekh Rajvansh	Sapna Babul Ka...Bidaai	
2008		Harshad Chopda	Prem Juneja	Kis Desh Mein Hai Meraa Dil	
2008		Karan Singh Grover	Dr. Armaan Mallik	Dill Mill Gaye	
2008		Ram Kapoor	Jai Walia	Kasamh Se	

=== 2010s ===
Year	Photo	Actor	Character	Show	Ref
2010		Sushant Singh Rajput	Manav Deshmukh	Pavitra Rishta	
2010		Arhaan Behl	Krishna Singh	Mann Kee Awaaz Pratigya	
2010		Iqbal Khan	Rudra Singh Rawat	Sanjog Se Bani Sangini	
2010		Karan Mehra	Naitik Singhania	Yeh Rishta Kya Kehlata Hai	
2010		Nandish Sandhu	Veer Singh Bundela	Uttaran	
2010		Ronit Roy	Dharamraj Mahiyanshi	Bandini	
2011		Sushant Singh Rajput	Manav Deshmukh	Pavitra Rishta	
2011		Harshad Chopda	Anurag Ganguly	Tere Liye	
2011		Arhaan Behl	Krishna Singh	Mann Kee Awaaz Pratigya	
2011		Karan Mehra	Naitik Singhania	Yeh Rishta Kya Kehlata Hai	
2011		Nandish Sandhu	Veer Singh Bundela	Uttaran	
2011		Ronit Roy	Dharamraj Mahiyanshi	Bandini	
2012		Ram Kapoor	Ram Kapoor	Bade Achhe Lagte Hain	
2012		Samir Soni	Kunal Chopra	Parichay	
2012		Anas Rashid	Sooraj Rathi	Diya Aur Baati Hum	
2012		Gurmeet Chaudhary	Maan Singh Khurana	Geet - Hui Sabse Parayi	
2012		Hiten Tejwani	Manav Deshmukh	Pavitra Rishta	
2012		Ronit Roy	KD Pathak	Adaalat	
2013		Karan Singh Grover	Asad Khan	Qubool Hai	
2013		Sidharth Shukla	Shivraj Shekhar	Balika Vadhu	
2013		Anas Rashid	Sooraj Rathi	Diya Aur Baati Hum	
2013		Vivian Dsena	Rishabh Kundra	Madhubala - Ek Ishq Ek Junoon	
2013		Gurmeet Chaudhary	Yash Sindhia	Punar Vivaah	
2013		Mohit Raina	Shiva	Devon Ke Dev...Mahadev	
2013		Ram Kapoor	Ram Kapoor	Bade Achhe Lagte Hain	
2014		Karan Patel	Raman Bhalla	Yeh Hai Mohabbatein	
2014		Gautam Rode	Saraswatichandra Vyas	Saraswatichandra	
2014		Rajat Tokas	Akbar	Jodha Akbar	
2014		Mohit Raina	Shiva	Devon Ke Dev...Mahadev	
2014		Anas Rashid	Sooraj Rathi	Diya Aur Baati Hum	
2014		Shaheer Sheikh	Arjuna	Mahabharat	
2014		Ashish Sharma	Rudra Pratap Singh	Rangrasiya	
2015		Karan Patel	Raman Bhalla	Yeh Hai Mohabbatein	
2015		Ronit Roy	Nachiket Khanna	Itna Karo Na Mujhe Pyar	
2015		Shakti Arora	Ranveer Vaghela	Meri Aashiqui Tumse Hi	
2015		Ravi Dubey	Siddharth Khurana	Jamai Raja	
2015		Shabir Ahluwalia	Abhishek Mehra	Kumkum Bhagya	
2015		Sharad Malhotra	Maharana Pratap	Bharat Ka Veer Putra – Maharana Pratap	
2016		Karan Patel	Raman Bhalla	Yeh Hai Mohabbatein	
2016		Shabir Ahluwalia	Abhishek Mehra	Kumkum Bhagya	
2016		Arjun Bijlani	Ritik Singh	Naagin 1	
2016		Sharad Malhotra	Rishi Singh Bedi	Kasam Tere Pyaar Ki	
2016		Ravi Dubey	Siddharth Khurana	Jamai Raja	
2016		Anas Rashid	Sooraj Rathi	Diya Aur Baati Hum	
2017		Karan Patel	Raman Bhalla	Yeh Hai Mohabbatein	
2017		Karanvir Bohra	Rocky Pratap Singh	Naagin 2	
2017		Shabir Ahluwalia	Abhishek Mehra	Kumkum Bhagya	
2017		Sharad Malhotra	Rishi Singh Bedi	Kasam Tere Pyaar Ki	
2017		Nakuul Mehta	Shivaay Singh Oberoi	Ishqbaaaz	
2018		Nakuul Mehta	Shivaay Singh Oberoi	Ishqbaaaz	
2018		Shabir Ahluwalia	Abhishek Mehra	Kumkum Bhagya	
2018		Harshad Chopda	Captain Aditya Hooda	Bepannah	
2018		Mohsin Khan	Kartik Goenka	Yeh Rishta Kya Kehlata Hai	
2018		Dheeraj Dhoopar	Karan Luthra	Kundali Bhagya	
2018		Karan Patel	Raman Bhalla	Ye Hai Mohabbatein	
2019		Dheeraj Dhoopar	Karan Luthra	Kundali Bhagya	
2019		Mohsin Khan	Kartik Goenka	Yeh Rishta Kya Kehlata Hai	
2019		Shabir Ahluwalia	Abhishek Mehra	Kumkum Bhagya	
2019		Parth Samthaan	Anurag Basu	Kasautii Zindagii Kay	
2019		Pearl V Puri	Mahir Sehgal	Naagin 3	
2019		Shaheer Sheikh	Abir Rajvansh	Yeh Rishtey Hain Pyaar Ke	
2019		Mohit Malik	Sikander Singh Gill	Kulfi Kumar Bajewala	
