= Rajat Tokas =

Indian actor (born 1991)

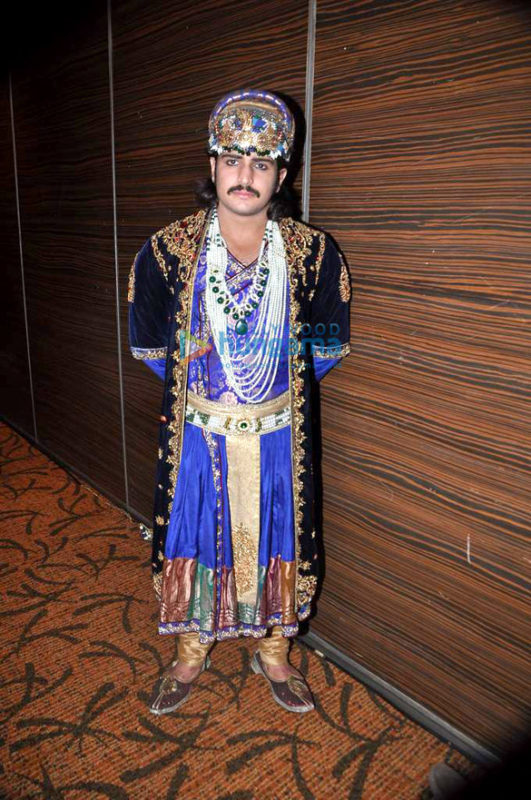
- Tokas in 2013
- Born: 19 July 1991 (age 35); Munirka, Delhi, India
- Occupation: Actor
- Years active: 2005–2019
- Notable work: Dharti Ka Veer Yodha Prithviraj Chauhan; Dharam Veer; Jodha Akbar; Naagin 3; chandra nandini
- Spouse: Shrishti Nayyar (m. 2015)

Rajat Tokas born 19 July 1991, is an Indian actor who primarily works in Hindi television. Recognised for his portrayal of historic characters, Tokas is best known for his portrayal of Prithviraj Chauhan in Dharti Ka Veer Yodha Prithviraj Chauhan and Akbar in Jodha Akbar. His other notable work includes Dharam Veer and Naagin 3 and Chandra Nandhini . Tokas is a recipient of several accolades including one ITA Award and three Indian Telly Awards.

== Career ==
=== Debut and Prithviraj Chauhan (2005–2012) ===
Tokas started his television career with show Bongo as Ashu on DD national. He then did many shows including Lighthouse for children, Jadui Chirag, Tarang, and Ye Hawayan. In 2005, he came to Mumbai with his father and bagged the role of Tantya, who was Sai Baba's brother, in Sai Baba.

In 2006, Tokas was selected by Sagar Arts to play his first lead role of young Prithviraj Chauhan in the series Dharti Ka Veer Yodha Prithviraj Chauhan for which he won best actor in ITA 2007.

In 2008 he was again selected by Sagar Arts to play Veer in the NDTV imagine show Dharam Veer.

In 2010-11, Ekta Kapoor of Balaji Telefilms chose Rajat to play the parallel lead in Tere Liye where he played the character of Robindo Ganguly. Later, he did episodic roles in Bandini and Fear Files: Darr Ki Sacchi Tasvirein.

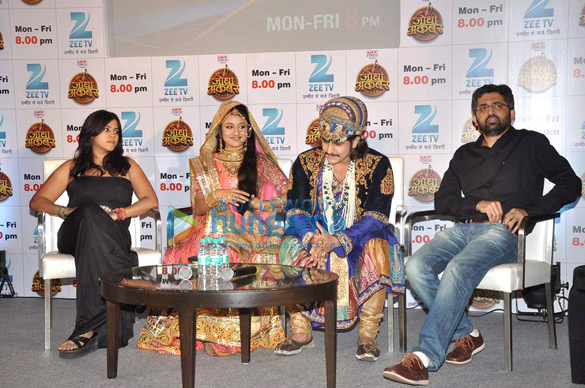
Ekta Kapoor, Paridhi Sharma, Rajat Tokas, Ajay Bhalwankar at Jodha Akbar launch

=== Jodha Akbar and other success (2013–2019) ===
In 2013, Tokas starred in the role of Mughal Emperor Jalaluddin Mohammed Akbar in the historical drama show Jodha Akbar. It aired from 18 June 2013 to 7 August 2015 on Zee TV and was produced by Ekta Kapoor under Balaji Telefilms. The show was a critical and commercial success amassing regularly high TV viewership ratings. Critics have praised the series for its acting, scope, soundtrack and production values. Tokas went on to win several awards for his performance including BIG Star Most Entertaining Television Actor - Male, Star Guild Award for Best Actor in a Drama Series, Boroplus Gold Award for Best Actor in Lead Role (Critics), and Indian Telly Award for Best Actor in a Lead Role.

In 2016, he played the negative role of Kabir (Icchadhari Nevla) in Naagin, a fantasy drama which was aired on Colors TV. Also in 2016 he was selected by Balaji Telefilms to play the lead role of Chandragupta Maurya in Star Plus show Chandra Nandini. He returned to reprise his role of Vikrant in 2019 in Naagin 3, again produced by Balaji Telefilms.

== Early and personal life ==
He studied in the Hope Hall Foundation School, R. K. Puram, Delhi and later on completed his graduation through distance mode.

On 30 January 2015, he married Shrishti Nayyar, a theatre actor.

== Filmography ==
=== Television ===
Year	Title	Role	Notes	Ref.
2005	Sai Baba	Tantya	Child artist	
2006–07	Dharti Ka Veer Yodha Prithviraj Chauhan	Prithviraj Chauhan		
2008	Dharam Veer	Veer		
2010	Keshav Pandit	Madhav Shastri		
2010–11	Tere Liye	Robindo Shekhar Ganguly		
2013–15	Jodha Akbar	Jalaluddin Mohammad Akbar		
2016	Naagin	Ichhadhaari Nevla (Fake Kabir Oberoi)		
2016–17	Chandra Nandini	Chandragupta Maurya		
2018–19	Naagin 3	Ichhadhaari Naag Vikrant		

==== Special appearances ====
Year	Title	Role	Notes	Ref.
2011	Bandini	Krishna		
2012	Fear Files: Darr Ki Sacchi Tasvirein	Ankush	Season 1, Episode 26	

== Awards ==
Year	Award	Category	Series	Result
2007	7th Indian Television Academy Awards	Best Actor in Lead Role (Popular)	Dharti Ka Veer Yodha Prithviraj Chauhan	Won
2007	7th Indian Telly Awards	Best Child Artiste (Male)	Dharti Ka Veer Yodha Prithviraj Chauhan	Won
2007	7th Indian Telly Awards	Dharti ka Sitara	Dharti Ka Veer Yodha Prithviraj Chauhan	Won
2013	BIG Star Entertainment Awards	Most Entertaining Television Actor (Male)	Jodha Akbar	Won
2014	7th Boroplus Gold Awards	Best Actor in Lead Role (Critics)	Jodha Akbar	Won
2014	13th Indian Telly Awards	Best Actor in a Lead Role	Jodha Akbar	Won
2014	9th Renault Star Guild Awards	Best Actor in a Drama Series	Jodha Akbar	Won

== See also ==
- List of Indian television actors
