= Bhanujeet Sudan =

Indian actor

- Born: 14 April 1981 (age 45); Kolkata, India
- Occupations: Actor, Model
- Years active: 2000–2019

Bhanujeet Sudan (born 14 April 1981) is an Indian model and television actor who made his debut in 2006 show Bhabhi in the lead role of Nihaal. He has appeared on the show Pavitra Rishta as Rishabh, SuperCops vs Supervillains, Itna Karo Na Mujhe Pyaar as Babu, Ye Hai Mohabbatein as Subbhu and Adaalat as Sanjay Rathore. He is the younger brother of model Inder Mohan Sudan. Bhanujeet, also a model has walked the ramp for designers Tarun Tahiliani, Manish Malhotra and Ritu Beri.

== Television ==
Year	Film	Role	Ref.
2006 - 2008	Bhabhi	Nihaal	
2013 - 2014	Pavitra Rishta	Rishabh Kapoor	
2014	Do Dil Bandhe Ek Dori Se	Rohit Seharia	
2015	Itna Karo Na Mujhe Pyaar	Babu Bhai	
2015 - 2016	Ye Hai Mohabbatein	Dr. Subramaniam Chandran "Subbhu"	
2016	Adaalat	Sanjay Rathore	
2018-2019	Patiala Babes	Ashok Khurana	

=== Music videos ===
Year	Song	Singer	Co-star(s)	Role	Note	Ref
2005	"Tera Mera Pyar"	Kumar Sanu	Nimrat Kaur	Boy in theater		
2005	"Yeh Kya Hua"	Shreya Ghoshal	Nimrat Kaur	Boy in theater		
