= Laqshya =

- Directed by: Bhagwan Thakur
- Produced by: Asha Kumar
- Starring: Ronit Roy; Priyanka; Tinu Anand; Paresh Rawal
- Music by: Jatin–Lalit
- Release date: 1994
- Running time: 143 minutes

Laqshya is a 1994 Bollywood film directed by Bhagwan Thakur and starring Ronit Roy, Priyanka, Tinu Anand and Paresh Rawal. The film didn't perform well at the box office.

== Cast ==
- Ronit Roy as Prakash
- Priyanka as Dhristi
- Tinu Anand as Vivek
- Paresh Rawal as Sagar Bhardwaj
- Sujit Kumar as Vikas
- Dalip Tahil as Shamsher

== Soundtrack ==
#	Song title	Singer(s)	Lyricist(s)
1	"Bekhudi Ke Nashe"	Udit Narayan, Sadhana Sargam	Majrooh Sultanpuri
2	"Pyar Karte Hain Hum"	Alka Yagnik, Abhijeet	Rani Malik
3	"Raftaar Hai Zindagi Ki"	Jatin Pandit, Abhijeet, Udit Narayan	Majrooh Sultanpuri
4	"Tere Bina O Mere Sanam"	Kumar Sanu, Kavita Krishnamurthy	Majrooh Sultanpuri
5	"Tum Humko Hum Tumko"	Kumar Sanu, Alka Yagnik	Rani Malik
6	"Tumhare Paas Aane Se"	Kumar Sanu, Alka Yagnik	Madan Pal
7	"Yeh Dil Sanam Tumhare"	Kumar Sanu, Alka Yagnik	Anwar Sagar
