= Mohit Raina =

Indian actor (born 1982)

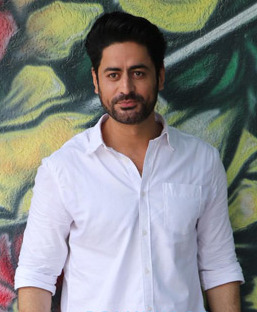
- Raina in 2019
- Born: 14 August 1982 (age 44)
- Occupations: Actor; model
- Years active: 2004–present
- Spouse: Aditi Chandra (m. 2022)
- Children: 1

Mohit Raina (born 14 August 1982) is an Indian actor who appears in Hindi films and television. He started his acting career with a science fiction show Antariksh (2004) and later went on to play a role in Don Muthu Swami (2008). He is best known for the lead role of the Hindu god Shiva in the television series Devon Ke Dev – Mahadev and Mahabharat, prior to which he is known for the roles as lead in Chehra, Ganga Kii Dheej and supporting role in Bandini.

== Early life and background ==
Mohit Raina was born into a Kashmiri Pandit family on 14 August 1982 to Dr. Udesh Chandar Raina and Dura raina and raised in Jammu. He was educated at Kendriya Vidyalaya School, Jammu and earned a bachelor of Commerce degree from University of Jammu. He moved to Mumbai to begin a career in modelling. He hoped that modelling would provide him with a route into acting work and lost 29 kilograms (64 lb) from his teenage weight of 107 kilograms (236 lb) so that he could participate in the 2005 Grasim Mister India modelling contest. He was placed among the top five contestants in that competition.

== Career ==
Mohit's acting career began in 2004 with a science fiction TV show called Antariksh. In 2008, he starred as Jai Kishan in the comedy film Don Muthu Swami, which was not a success at the box office and caused him to return to television work. In 2009 he appeared in the Chehra TV series, a suspense drama revolving around a disabled girl. Mohit played her husband Garv, a young business tycoon. He was also part of Bandini.

In 2011, he was cast as the lead in Nikhil Sinha's Devon Ke Dev – Mahadev. The series focused on the god Shiva and portrays his journey from a hermit to a householder through his marriage to Sati and later to Parvati. Mohit worked on improving his physique for the role, and started learning the Indian classical dance form Kathak, which is integral part of his role as Shiva. The Times of India said the role created fans due to his "fab abs, groovy smile and acting chops" He played over 30 different characters in the series, which ran for three years, ending in December 2014, by which time Mohit had become a celebrity.

Mohit has played the adult emperor Ashoka, in the historical serial Chakravartin Ashoka Samrat on Colors TV. The series started broadcasting from 2 May 2016. After Ashoka, Mohit also played the lead role as Havildar Ishar Singh in 21 Sarfarosh - Saragarhi 1897 which is based on the Battle of Saragarhi.

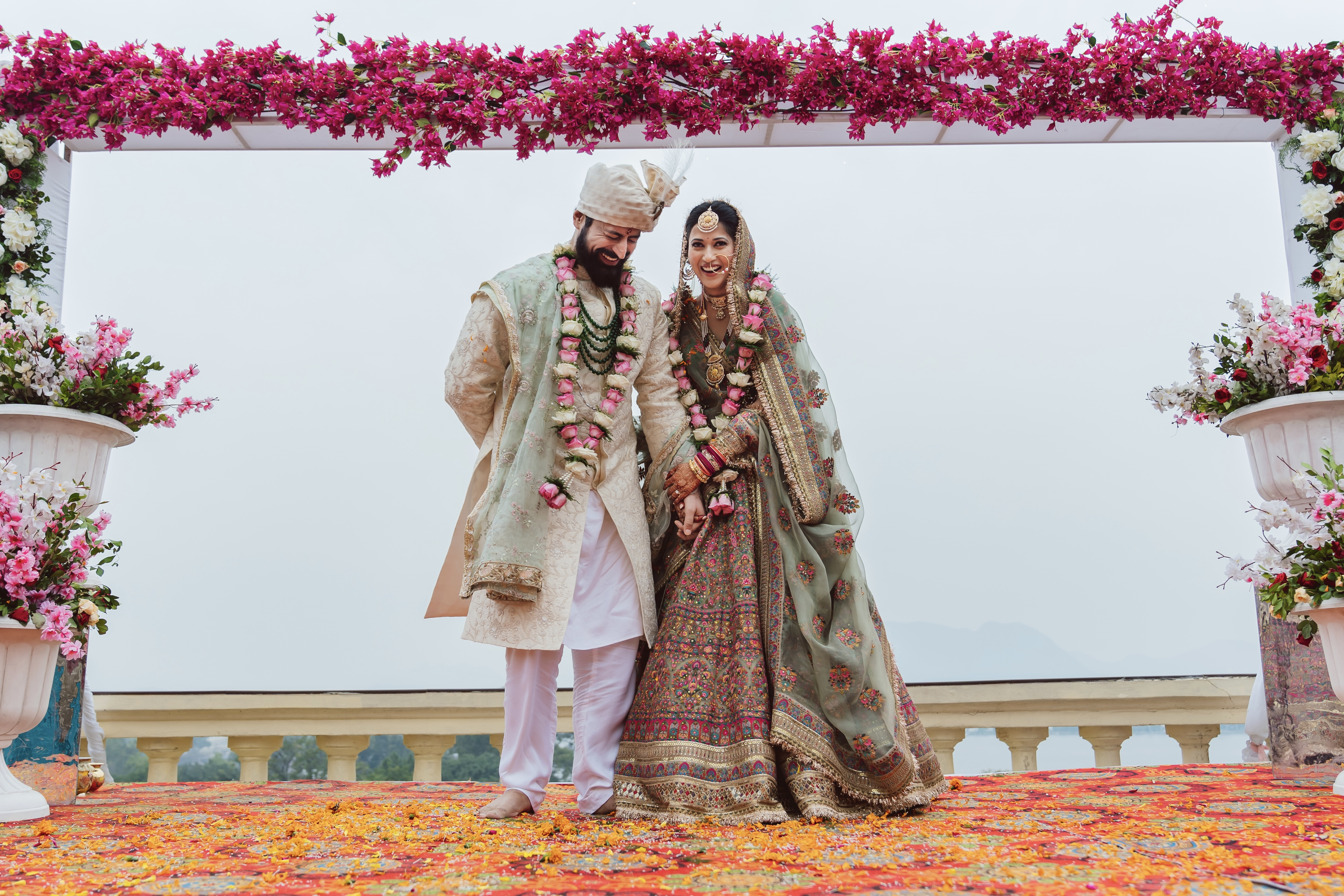
Mohit Raina and Aditi Chandra wedding

Mohit played the role of Major Karan Kashyap in the Bollywood film Uri: The Surgical Strike, released on 11 January 2019.

He made his web debut with the ZEE5 web series Kaafir, starring opposite Dia Mirza.

Mohit Raina is playing the character of Dr. Kaushik Oberoi the series Mumbai Diaries 26/11. The show is created by Nikkhil Advani and produced by Emmay Entertainment. It also stars Konkana Sen Sharma, Tina Desai, and Shreya Dhanwanthary.

== Personal life ==
On 1 January 2022, Raina revealed that he had married his longtime girlfriend Aditi Chandra. The couple had their first child, a baby girl on 16 March 2023.

== Filmography ==
Key
†	Denotes films that have not yet been released

=== Films ===
Year	Title	Role	Notes
2008	Don Muthu Swami	Jaikishan	
2019	Uri – The Surgical Strike	Major Karan Kashyap	
2019	Good Newwz	Flight passenger	Cameo appearance
2020	Mrs. Serial Killer	Imran Shahid	
2021	Shiddat	Gautam	
2023	Ishq-e-Nadaan	Ashutosh	

=== Television ===
Year	Title	Role	Notes	Ref.
2005	Meher			
2005	Bhabhi	Shubham		
2006–2007	Antariksh – Ek Amar Katha	Vikrant		
2009	Chehra	Garv Dhanvat Rai		
2010	Bandini	Rishabh Hiten Mahivanshi		
2011	Ganga Kii Dheej	Agantuk		
2011–2014	Devon Ke Dev – Mahadev	Shiva		
2013	Mahabharat	Shiva		
2016	Chakravartin Ashoka Samrat	Ashoka		
2018	21 Sarfarosh - Saragarhi 1897	Havildar Ishar Singh		
2019	Kaafir	Vedant Rathod		
2020–2022	Bhaukaal	Navniet Sekera	2 seasons	
2020	A Viral Wedding	Yudhisthir Kaul		
2021–2023	Mumbai Diaries 26/11	Dr. Kaushik Oberoi	2 seasons	
2023	The Freelancer	Avinash Kamath		
2025	Kankhajura	Max Gaonkar	1 Season	

== Awards and nominations ==
Year	Award	Category	Work	Result	Ref.
2013	Indian Telly Awards	Best Actor (Jury)	Devon Ke Dev...Mahadev	Won	
2013	Indian Telly Awards	Best Actor in a Lead Role	Devon Ke Dev...Mahadev	Nominated	
2013	Indian Television Academy Awards	Best Actor – Drama	Devon Ke Dev...Mahadev	Nominated	
2013	Indian Television Academy Awards	Best Actor in a Negative Role	Devon Ke Dev...Mahadev	Won	
2013	Gold Awards	Steller Performance of the Year	Devon Ke Dev...Mahadev	Won	
2013	Gold Awards	Best Actor	Devon Ke Dev...Mahadev	Nominated	
2014	Indian Telly Awards	Best Actor in a Lead Role	Devon Ke Dev...Mahadev	Nominated	
2014	Indian Telly Awards	Best Actor (Jury)	Devon Ke Dev...Mahadev	Nominated	
2014	Indian Television Academy Awards	Best Actor – Drama	Devon Ke Dev...Mahadev	Nominated	
2015	Star Guild Awards	Best TV Actor	Devon Ke Dev...Mahadev	Won	
2018	Indian Television Academy Awards	Best Actor – Drama	21 Sarfarosh - Saragarhi 1897	Won	
2019	Indian Telly Awards	Best Actor (Jury)	21 Sarfarosh - Saragarhi 1897	Won	

== See also ==
- List of Indian television actors
- List of Indian film actors
