= Love All (film) =

- Poster
- Directed by: Sudhanshu Sharma
- Screenplay by: Sudhanshu Sharma; Sonal
- Story by: Sudhanshu Sharma
- Produced by: Sudhanshu Sharma
- Starring: Kay Kay Menon; Shriswara; Swastika Mukherjee; Sumit Arora
- Cinematography: Raut Jaywant Murlidhar
- Edited by: Aalaap Majgavkar; Raunak Phadnis
- Music by: Saurabh-Vaibhav
- Production companies: Filmart Productions; L6F Studios; Anand Pandit Motion Pictures
- Distributed by: M. Ramesh’s Lakshmi Ganapathy Films Studios
- Release date: 1 September 2023
- Country: India
- Language: Hindi

Love All is a 2023 Indian Hindi-language sports drama film written, directed and produced by Sudhanshu Sharma. Featuring Kay Kay Menon, Shriswara, Swastika Mukherjee, Sumit Arora, Ark Jain, Deep Rambhiya, and Mazel Vyas. The film was initially set to be released on 25 August 2023, in theaters. However, it got postponed by one week, to 1 September 2023.

== Synopsis ==
Love-All portrays Siddharth, a small-town Badminton star whose ambitions crumble due to injury and financial struggles. He abandons his dreams, grows bitter and distant, even forbids his son from participating in any kind of sports. Destiny brings him back to the same city, which he left many years ago, forcing him to confront his past and make some tough choices. He seeks redemption by exploring his lost passion for badminton again, but this time through someone else.

== Cast ==
- Kay Kay Menon as Siddharth
- Shriswara as Jaya, Siddharth’s wife
- Swastika Mukherjee as Soma, Siddharth’s friend
- Atul Srivastava
- Sumit Arora as Viju, Siddharth’s friend
- Ark Jain as Aditya, Siddharth’s son
- Deep Rambhiya as Young Siddharth
- Mazel Vyas as Young Soma
- Tanishka Mihi Varma as Pakhi
- Robin Das as Baba

== Production ==
Released under the banner of M. Ramesh’s Lakshmi Ganapathy Films Studios (Distributors), the film is produced by FilmArt Studios (Production) and presented by LGF Studios, Anand Pandit, Pullela Gopichand, and Mahesh Bhatt. Love-All is produced by Sudhanshu Sharma, supported for marketing and distribution efforts by Dilipsoni Jaiswal, Rahul V. Dubey, and Sanjay Singh. The screenplay and dialogues are penned by Sudhanshu Sharma and Sonal. Music for the film is composed by Saurabh-Vaibhav, while lyrics were created by Ankit Pandey and Sonal. Background score is by Debarpito Saha. Cinematography is done by Raut Jaywant Murlidhar (WICA), and the editing is done by Aalaap Majgavkar and Raunak Phadnis.
