= Kehta Hai Dil =

Indian television series (2002–2005)

- Directed by: Rakesh Sarang
- Starring: see below
- Music by: Lalit Sen
- Opening theme: "Kehta Hai Dil" by Mahalakshmi Iyer and Kumar Sanu
- Country of origin: India
- No. of episodes: 144

Production
- Producers: Ronnie Screwvala; Zarina Mehta
- Running time: approx. 52 minutes
- Production company: UTV Software Communications

Original release
- Network: Star Plus
- Release: 2 July 2002 – 29 March 2005

Related
- Picket Fences

Kehta Hai Dil (transl. The heart says) is an Indian soap opera that aired on Star Plus channel from 2 July 2002 to 29 March 2005, and is produced by UTV Software Communications. The story is based on the life of a girl named Karishma and portrays the dramatic events that occur in her life, which affect her entire family - who lives in the small, idyllic town of Anand Nagar. The series was initially based on the American CBS series Picket Fences. However soon the story was entirely deviated from Picket Fences.

== Plot ==
Kehta Hai Dil is the story of a family who lives in the small, idyllic town of Anand Nagar. It is the family of Superintendent of Police (SP) Adityapratap Singh, Dr. Jaya Singh, and their three children - Karishma, Kunal and Kiran. Karishma loves Dhruv who is her childhood friend. Their fathers have also been friends.

SP Adityapratap tries to expose the corrupt town mayor Bhandari and his wife Lalita Devi. To take revenge, Lalita makes her elder son Nikhil befriend Karishma and then makes the media print a fake report alleging that Karishma is having an affair with Nikhil. This forces Karishma to marry Nikhil. It is only after they are married that the Bhandaris' lies is revealed. A devastated Karishma vows to take revenge on every single one of them. The story follows Karishma as she exacts her revenge and exposes the Bhandaris.

== Cast ==
- Kamya Panjabi / Pallavi Kulkarni as Karishma Singh / Karishma Nikhil Bhandari (lead role)
- Aman Verma / Akshay Anand as SP Adityapratap Singh
- Gautami Kapoor as Dr. Jaya Adityapratap Singh
- Swapnil Joshi as Dhruv
- Manoj Joshi as Mayor Bhandari
- Rushad Rana as Nikhil Bhandari: Mayor Bhandari and Lalita's adopted son; Aanchal's elder cousin (2002–2003) (Dead)
- Grusha Kapoor as Lalita Bhandari: Mayor Bhandari's wife; Nikhil's adopted mother; Aanchal's mother (2002–2005) (Dead)
- Ram Kapoor as Jai Singh
- Nivedita Bhattacharya as Mrs. Singh
- Manoj Pahwa as Ranbir
- Kuljeet Randhawa as Sonia
- Mehul Kajaria as Kunal Singh
- Tanvi Bhatia as Kiran Singh
- Dara Singh as Karishma's Grandfather
- Soumya Arya as Dr. Talwar
- Kajal Nishad as Priya
- Rajeev Kumar as Inspector Vikram
- Lata Sabharwal as Constable's Wife
- S.P Khere as Ameeta's Father
- Reshma Polekar as Ameeta
- Suhita Thatte as Sarson
- Pamela Mukherjee as Divya
- Devanshi as Sonia's Son
- Sushmita Daan as Nilanjana
- Atul Srivastava as Charandas
- Hrishita as Deepti
- Shagufta Ali as Jaya's Mother
- Rakesh as Pappu
- Tina Parekh as Dhruv's Friend
- Rajesh Asthana as Inspector
- Khyaati Khandke Keswani as Aanchal
- Abbas Khan as Chota Pappu
- Shadab Khan as Doctor
- Sunita Verma as Menka
- Rajni Chandra as Nikhil's Mother
- Manav Merchant as Ravi
- Dinesh Hinge as Judge
- Navin Nischol as Pradhan
- Natasha Sinha as Manju
- Tanvir Roy as Chief Minister
- Rahul Lohani as Swayam
- Prithvi Zutshi as Professor
- Pankaj Mishra as Narayan
- Narendra Gupta as Dr. Jain
- Salil Ankola as Ranveer Rathore / Sandeep Jain / Shakti Singh
- Veerendra Saxena as Bijlani
- Nagesh Bhonsle as Inspector Pandey
- Sandeep Vohra as Prosecutor
- Sunil Verma as Prisoner
- Sunil Ghate as Judge
- Kavita Vaid
- Pooja as Shangrila

== Reception ==
Aired on Tuesdays at prime time, it became the most watched Hindi show in its slot and one of the top ten Hindi GEC overall. Despite deviating entirely from Picket Fences, it was one of the top shows. In third week of August 2004, it garnered 7.1 TVR. Between July and October 2004, it averaged 9.6 TVR with a peak rating of 10.5 TVR.

== Soundtrack ==
The music for Kehta Hai Dil was composed by Lalit Sen, and the lyrics were penned by Naqsh Lyalpuri. The title track was sung by Kumar Sanu, Mahalakshmi Iyer, and Priya Bhattachariya.

== Awards ==
The series has won the following awards in The Indian Telly Awards of 2003:

- Best Actor in a Negative Role (Male) – Manoj Joshi Shared with Mohnish Behl.
- Best Actor of the Year (Male) – Aman Verma shared with Shivaji Satam.
