= Pallavi Kulkarni =

Indian actress

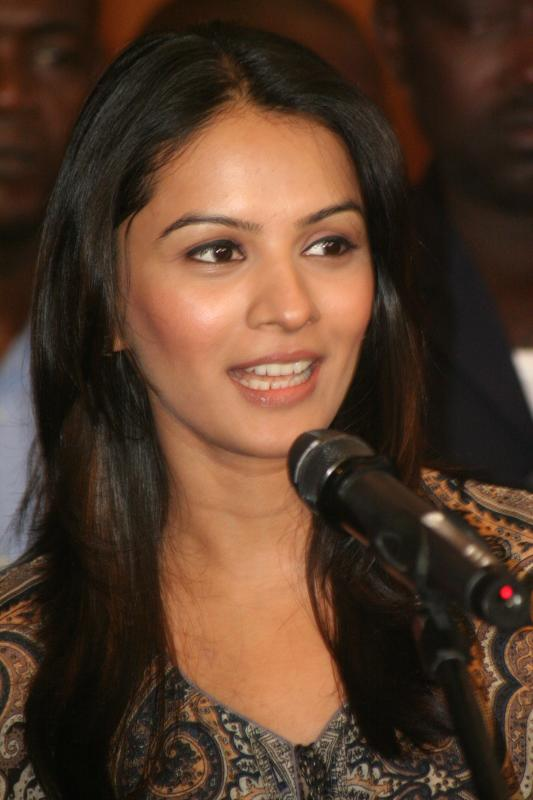
- Born: Pallavi Kulkarni
- Occupation: Actress
- Years active: 1999–2007; 2014–2015; 2017; 2021
- Known for: Arjun Pandit; Kehta Hai Dil; Vaidehi; Itna Karo Na Mujhe Pyaar
- Spouse: Mihir Nerurkar (m. 2007)
- Children: 1

Pallavi Kulkarni is an Indian actress who mainly works in Hindi television. Kulkarni is best known for her portrayal of Karishma Singh Bhandari in Kehta Hai Dil, Vaidehi Jaisingh in Vaidehi and Ragini Patel Khanna in Itna Karo Na Mujhe Pyaar.

== Personal life ==
Kulkarni married Mihir Nerurkar in 2007, after which she took a break from acting. The couple has a son named Kayaan Nerukar.

== Filmography ==
=== Films ===
| Year | Title | Role | Notes | Ref. |
|---|---|---|---|---|
| 1999 | Arjun Pandit | Shilpa Dixit | | |
| 2002 | Kranti | Anu Singh | | |
| 2017 | Munna Michael | | Cameo appearance | |

=== Television ===
| Year | Serial | Role | Notes | Ref. | Co–Star |
|---|---|---|---|---|---|
| 1999–2000 | Hudd Kar Di | Riya Dhanwa Malhotra | Lead role | | Kabir Sadanand |
| 2000 | Aaj Bhi Ateet | Neha | Lead role | | Ujjwal Rana |
| 2002 | Kya Hadsaa Kya Haqeeqat – Hadsaa | Neonika "Nikki" Chatterjee | Lead role | | Sumeet Sachdev; Rajeev Khandelwal |
| 2002–2005 | Kehta Hai Dil | Karishma Singh Bhandari | Lead role | | Swapnil Joshi; Rushad Rana |
| 2005 | Kaisa Ye Pyar Hai | Herself | Guest appearance | | |
| 2006 | Vaidehi | Vaidehi Aryavardhan Jaisingh | Lead role | | Sachin Sharma; Manav Gohil |
| 2014–2015 | Itna Karo Na Mujhe Pyaar | Ragini Patel Khanna | Lead role | | Ronit Roy; Darshan Pandya |

=== Web series ===
| Year | Title | Role | Notes | Ref. |
|---|---|---|---|---|
| 2021 | 1962: The War in the Hills | Jaya | On Disney+ Hotstar | |
