= Shriswara =

Indian film actress

- Born: Shriswara Dubey; India
- Other names: Sreeswara; Sriswara
- Occupation: Actress
- Known for: D-Day as Nafisa
- Notable work: Singham Returns (2014); Simmba (2018); Baaghi 3 (2020)

Shriswara Dubey, known mononymously as Shriswara, is an Indian actress who mainly works in Hindi films and television shows. She is best-known for her performances in films like D-Day, Singham Returns, Baaghi 3.

== Early life ==
Shriswara grew up in Lucknow. She completed her studies in the United States where she also participated in pageant competitions.

== Filmography ==
=== Films ===
Year	Title	Role	Notes
2013	Bhaag Milkha Bhaag	Nirmal Saini	deleted scenes
2013	D-Day	Nafisa Rehmani	
2014	Singham Returns	Neeta Parmar	
2015	Guddu Rangeela	Babli Singh	
2017	Golmaal Again	Prerna Iyer	
2018	Rangoon	Haseena Ranade	
2018	Simmba	Varsha Ranade	
2019	Section 375	Kainaaz Khurana	
2020	Baaghi 3	Hafeeza Siddiqui	
2021	Uma	Mrinalini	Unreleased
2023	Love All	Jaya	
2025	The Diplomat	Naina	

=== Television ===
Year(s)	Series	Role	Notes
2018	Breathe	Dr. Aruna Sharma	
2018	Swami Ramdev - Ek Sangharsh	Gulabo Devi	
2020	The Will	Padma Sharma	

=== Web series ===
Year(s)	Series	Role	Notes
2018	The Great Indian Dysfunctional Family	Geeta Ranaut	
2019–2020	Hostages	Saba Singh	

== Recognition ==
- 2014 - Nominated - Screen Weekly Awards - "Most Promising Newcomer - Female" - for her role Nafisa in D-Day.
