= Shabir Ahluwalia =

Indian actor and host (born 1979)

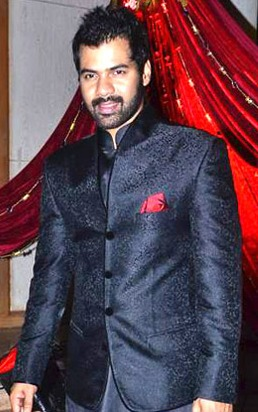
- Born: 10 August 1979 (age 47); Mumbai, Maharashtra, India
- Education: University of Maryland, College Park
- Occupations: Actor; Host
- Years active: 1999–present
- Notable work: Kumkum Bhagya
- Spouse: Kanchi Kaul (m. 2011)
- Children: 2

Shabir Ahluwalia (born 10 August 1979) is an Indian actor and host who works in Hindi television and films. He is best known for portraying Abhishek Prem Mehra in Zee TV's romantic drama series Kumkum Bhagya. He won the third season of Fear Factor: Khatron Ke Khiladi and hosted Nach Baliye, Guinness World Records – Ab India Todega and Dancing Queen.

Apart from this, Ahluwalia has acted in Kyunki Saas Bhi Kabhi Bahu Thi (2002), Kya Hadsaa Kya Haqeeqat (2004), Kahi To Milenge (2002), Kkavyanjali (2005), Kasamh Se (2006), Kasautii Zindagii Kay (2006), Kayamath (2007), Laagi Tujhse Lagan (2011) and many more. He made his debut in Bollywood with Shootout at Lokhandwala. His second film was Mission Istanbul.

== Early life ==
Ahluwalia was born on 10 August 1979 to a Sikh father and a Catholic mother in Mumbai. He has two siblings Shefali and Sameer Ahluwalia. He did his schooling from St. Xavier's High School, Vile Parle. He then completed his graduation from University of Maryland, College Park.

== Personal life ==
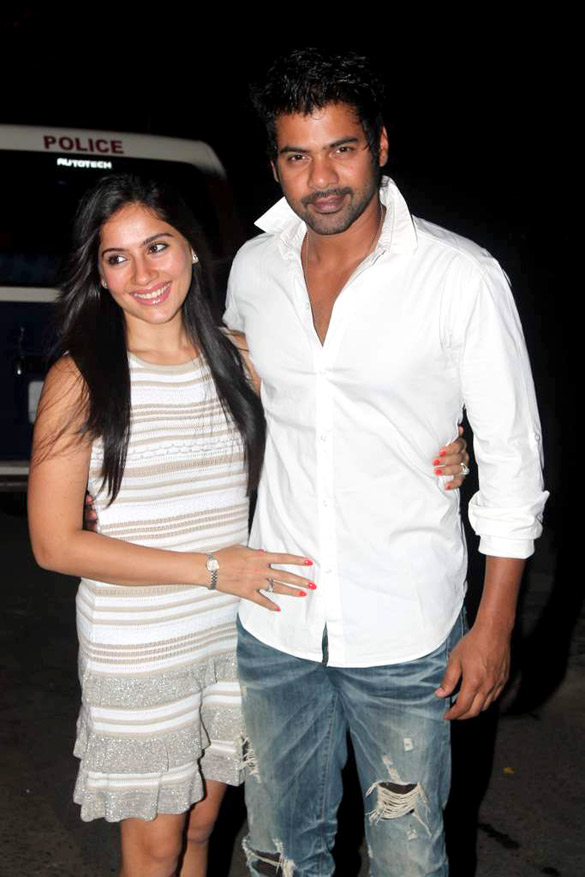
Kaul with husband Shabir Ahluwalia

Ahluwalia met actress Kanchi Kaul in 2007 on the sets of Bhabhi. After a five-year relationship, Ahluwalia married Kaul on 27 November 2011. The couple have two sons, Azai (born 23 July 2014) and Ivarr (born 18 February 2016).

== Filmography ==
=== Films ===
Year	Title	Role	Notes	Ref.
2007	Shootout at Lokhandwala	RC		
2008	Mission Istaanbul	Khalil Nazar		

=== Television ===
Year	Title	Role	Notes	Ref.
1999	Hip Hip Hurray	Purab		
2002	Kyunki Saas Bhi Kabhi Bahu Thi	Aniket Mehta		
2002	Sanjivani	Rohit		
2002	Kahi To Milenge	Shashaank		
2003–2007	Kahiin To Hoga	Rishi Garewaal		
2004	Kahaani Ghar Ghar Kii	Saumil Dikshit		
2004	Kya Hadsaa Kya Haqeeqat	Aman/Jay		
2005	Kkavyanjali	Vansh Malhotra		
2005–2006	Nach Baliye	Host	Seasons 1-2	
2006	Kasamh Se	Sandeep Sikand/Sandy		
2006–2007	Kasautii Zindagii Kay	Omi		
2007–2009	Kayamath	Milind Mishra		
2009	Dhamaal Express	Contestant		
2009	Dancing Queen	Host		
2010	Meethi Choori No 1	Host		
2010	Fear Factor: Khatron Ke Khiladi 3	Contestant	Winner	
2010	Guinness World Records – Ab India Todega	Host		
2011–2014	Celebrity Cricket League	Player	Seasons 1-4	
2011–2012	Laagi Tujhse Lagan	Dutta Bhau		
2013	Savitri	—N/a	Producer	
2014–2021	Kumkum Bhagya	Abhishek "Abhi" Mehra		
2017–2018	Kundali Bhagya	Abhishek "Abhi" Mehra	Special appearances	
2021	Bhagya Lakshmi	Abhishek "Abhi" Mehra	Special appearances	
2021	Meet	Abhishek "Abhi" Mehra	Special appearances	
2022–2024	Pyar Ka Pehla Naam: Radha Mohan	Mohan Trivedi		
2023	Pyar Ka Pehla Adhyaya: Shiv Shakti	Mohan Trivedi	Guest appearance	
2025	Ufff..Yeh Love Hai Mushkil	Advocate Yug Sinha		
2026–present	Oh Humnava Tum Dena Saath Mera	Rakshit Bhardwaj		
2026–present	Dhammal with Pati Patni Aur Panga – Jodiyon Ka Reality Check	Contestant	Season 2	

=== Web series ===
Year	Title	Role	Notes	Ref.
2019	Fixerr	Jaiveer Maalik	ALT Balaji series	

== Awards and nominations ==
Year	Award	Category	Work	Result	Ref.
2004	Indian Telly Awards	Best Actor in a Negative Role	Kahiin To Hoga	Won	
2005	Indian Telly Awards	Best Actor in a Negative Role	Kahiin To Hoga	Nominated	
2005	Indian Television Academy Awards	Best Actor in a Supporting Role	Kahiin To Hoga	Won	
2006	Indian Television Academy Awards	Best Anchor Music/Films (along with Sangeeta Ghosh)	Nach Baliye	Won	
2006	Indian Telly Awards	Best Actor in a Supporting Role	Kahiin To Hoga	Nominated	
2007	Indian Telly Awards	Best Anchor (along with Sangeeta Ghosh)	Nach Baliye	Nominated	
2007	Indian Telly Awards	Best Actor in a Lead Role	Kayamath	Nominated	
2008	Indian Telly Awards	Best Actor in a Lead Role	Kayamath	Nominated	
2008	Gold Awards	Best Actor in a Lead Role	Kayamath	Won	
2011	Gold Awards	Most Stylish Actor	—N/a	Won	
2014	Indian Television Academy Awards	Best Actor - Popular	Kumkum Bhagya	Nominated	
2015	Indian Telly Awards	Best Actor in a Lead Role	Kumkum Bhagya	Nominated	
2015	Indian Telly Awards	Best Onscreen Couple (along with Sriti Jha)	Kumkum Bhagya	Won	
2015	Gold Awards	Best Actor in a Lead Role – Jury	Kumkum Bhagya	Won	
2016	Indian Television Academy Awards	Best Actor - Popular	Kumkum Bhagya	Won	
2018	Gold Awards	Best Actor in a Leading Role	Kumkum Bhagya	Won	
2018	Gold Awards	Best On Screen Jodi (along with Sriti Jha)	Kumkum Bhagya	Nominated	
2019	Indian Telly Awards	Best Actor - Popular	Kumkum Bhagya	Nominated	
2019	Indian Telly Awards	Best Jodi Popular (along with Sriti Jha)	Kumkum Bhagya	Nominated	

== See also ==
- List of Indian television actors
