= Agni Shikha =

- Album Cover
- Directed by: Sujit Guha
- Produced by: Binu Sengupta; Damini Naidu
- Starring: Prosenjit Chatterjee; Ronit roy Rituparna Sengupta
- Music by: Bappi Lahiri
- Release date: 5 January 1999
- Running time: 1:25:45
- Country: India
- Language: Bengali

Agni Shikha (transl. Flames of Fire) is a 1999 film directed by Sujit Guha and produced by Binu Sengupta & Damini Naidu.

== Plot ==
Abhi hates his father since he believes that the man left his mother to marry a rich girl. He eventually begins to destroy his father's business empire, not knowing that the latter is also remorseful.

== Cast ==
- Prosenjit Chatterjee as Abhimanyu roy
- Ronit Roy as Prodipta Roy
- Rituparna Sengupta as chondra singh
- Ranjit Mallick as (Arjun) Abhi & Prodipta's Father
- Anuradha roy as Abhi's Mother
- Subhendu Chatterjee as Arjun's Father
