= Vaidehi (2006 TV series) =

Indian drama television series

- Promotional log
- Also known as: Vaidehi – Ek Aur Agni Pareeksha
- Created by: AK Films
- Directed by: Pawan Sahu
- Starring: See below
- Music by: Abhijeet Hegdepatil
- Opening theme: "Vaidehi"
- Country of origin: India
- No. of episodes: 54

Production
- Producer: Aruna Irani
- Running time: 23 minutes
- Production company: AK Films

Original release
- Network: Sony Entertainment Television
- Release: 5 June – 28 December 2006

Vaidehi or Vaidehi – Ek Aur Agni Pareeksha (transl. Vaidehi – One more test of fire) is an Indian Hindi-language television series that aired on Sony TV. The show premiered on 5 June 2006. It was produced by Aruna Irani.

== Plot ==
The story revolves around Vaidehi, a sweet 21-year-old middle-class girl, who dreams of marrying her Prince Charming and having a supportive family. Being born in a poor family made Vaidehi believe that her dream may never come true. However, Vaidehi's parents receive a marriage proposal for her from one of the richest families in the town — the Jaisinghs.

Vaidehi's family finds it hard to believe that the Jaisinghs want Vaidehi to marry their son Aryavardhan. Vaidehi is also sceptical and wonders about the reason behind this proposal and refuses the offer. After major pressure from her parents, Vaidehi marries Aryavardhan. A few days after her marriage, Vaidehi feels trapped in the relationship, and her life comes to a standstill. The question remains — what is the secret that lurks in the corridors of the Jaisingh mansion and what will happen when the truth is finally unveiled?

== Cast ==
- Pallavi Kulkarni as Vaidehi Aryavardhan Jaisingh, a spirited 21-year-old young woman.
- Sachin Sharma as Aryavardhan "Aryan" Jaisingh, Vaidehi's sophisticated yet possessive husband.
- Manav Gohil as Neel Agnihotri, Aryan's adopted brother, who falls in love with Vaidehi and eventually becomes her protector.
- Kiran Kumar as Harshvardhan "Harsh" Jaisingh, Aryan's father, the richest man in town.
- Aruna Irani as Sitadevi "Sita" Harshvardhan Jaisingh, Harsh's wife whom he's married since 35 years, who shares a motherly bond with Vaidehi.
- Vineet Raina as Yashvardhan "Yash" Jaisingh, Aryan's younger brother.
- Gulrez Khan as Maithili Yashvardhan Jaisingh, Yash's wife.
- Ashlesha Sawant as Bhumija Jaisingh / Bhumija Siddharth Singhania, Aryan's younger sister and Siddharth's wife.
- Sushmita Daan as Arundhati, a journalist whose only purpose is to unmask the Jaisingh family.
- Neetha Shetty as Natasha Jaisingh, Aryan's younger sister.
- Snigdha Akolkar as Janki Aryavardhan Jaisingh, Aryan's first wife, who faked her death to escape from him and the torture inflicted upon her by Aryan.
- Vishal Watwani as Sameer, Janki's second husband and Yuvika's father.
- Vivan Bhatena as Inspector Akash Jaisingh, Aryan's youngest brother.
- Sachin Shroff as Siddharth Singhania, Bhumija's husband.
- Namrata Thapa as Maithili Yashvardhan Jaisingh, Yash's wife.
- Siddharth Dhawan as Karan, Bhumija's ex-boyfriend.
- Amrapali Gupta as Varsha, Vaidehi's younger sister
- Sonia Singh as Anita, Vaidehi's friend and Yashvardhan's girlfriend
- Adita Wahi as Tara
- Baby Barbie as Yuvika, Sameer and Janki's daughter; Aryan's adopted daughter.
- Lira Williams as Priya
- Adi Irani
- Dinesh Kaushik
- Kulbir Baderson
- Rushita Singh
- Nasir Sheikh as Mr. Singhania

== Reception ==
Rediff.com stated the plot as interesting which makes viewers hooked to the series.
