= Guddu Rangeela =

2015 film by Subhash Kapoor

- Directed by: Subhash Kapoor
- Written by: Subhash Kapoor
- Produced by: Sangeeta Ahir
- Starring: Ronit Roy; Arshad Warsi; Amit Sadh; Aditi Rao Hydari
- Cinematography: Jamie Fowlds
- Edited by: Arindam Ghatak
- Music by: Songs: Amit Trivedi; Background Score: Hitesh Sonik
- Production company: Fox Star Studios
- Release date: 3 July 2015
- Running time: 124 minutes
- Country: India
- Language: Hindi
- Budget: ₹150 million (US$1.6 million)

Guddu Rangeela is an Indian action black comedy film, directed by Subhash Kapoor. It stars Arshad Warsi, Amit Sadh and Ronit Roy in the lead roles. The film is presented by Fox Star Studios and produced by Sangeeta Ahir. Guddu Rangeela has incorporated the Manoj-Babli honour killing case in the storyline. The film received mixed reviews upon release and was a major commercial failure at the box office.

== Plot ==
Based in North India, Guddu Rangeela is a story about two cousins trying to make ends meet in the crime infested surroundings. Rangeela (Arshad Warsi) and Guddu (Amit Sadh) are orchestra singers by day and informants by night, acquiring measly pay offs from the information provided to local gangsters about the richest families in town, which has brought them an easy and safe way to live without getting their hands dirty in the bargain. Although cousins by blood, both are very much unlike each other. The love/hate relation of the two comes to be seen through the many dangerously funny circumstances, that they are met with and their impromptu methods of saving their skin each time. Having suffered a tragic past at the hands of the gang lord turned politician Billu Pahalwan (Ronit Roy); the antagonist of the tale; both are discreetly entangled in a 10-year-old legal battle against him through Gupta, an honest advocate fighting on their behalf.

While the unorthodox and impulsive Guddu aspires to grow out of their hand to mouth way of life by executing the loot themselves, the comparatively self-righteous and mature Rangeela despises the idea of getting onto the dark side of the city's law. Like money, women too are Guddu's poison, who is time and again seen flirting and effortlessly pulling off one night stands. Rangeela on the contrary hasn't moved on from the tragedy that consumed his only love Babli (Shriswara) years back. Rangeela's prime motto has always been to overthrow his nemesis Billo, thus undoing the injustice and cruelty that transpired years back. Lucky enough, one such opportunity comes knocking. They kidnap Baby (Aditi Rao Hydari) from Shimla, looking to make an easy 1 million money in the process. In the process finds himself confronting the vicious and tyrannical Billo. What follows is a chaotic tale of redemption and payback. An ambition, a plan, a kidnapping and a To-and-Fro tale of victory and defeat leading up to a dramatic climax.

== Cast ==
- Arshad Warsi as Rangeela
- Amit Sadh as Guddu
- Ronit Roy as Billu Pahalwan, the main antagonist
- Aditi Rao Hydari as Baby
- Sandeep Goyat as Chottey
- Shriswara as BabliJ
- Dibyendu Bhattacharya as Bangali
- Brijendra Kala
- Achint Kaur as CM
- Amit Sial as Police Inspector Ajay Singh
- Rajiv Gupta as Inspector Gulab Singh
- Virendra Saxena as lawyer
- Vishal O Sharma
- Naushad Abbas as a real goon
- Yashpal Sharma as Rakshak Bhai
- Aparshakti Khurana as Inspector Laathi
- Omi Vaidya as Anthony

== Reception ==
The film grossed an estimated ₹73.6 million (US$780,000) after five days of its release and after that dropped heavily.

== Soundtrack ==
Guddu Rangeela

Soundtrack album by Amit Trivedi
- Released: 19 June 2015
- Genre: Feature film soundtrack
- Length: 19:03
- Language: Hindi
- Label: Zee Music Company

The songs for Guddu Rangeela are composed by Amit Trivedi while lyrics are written by Irshad Kamil. The first single "Mata Ka Email" was released on 8 June 2015. The full audio album was released on 19 June 2015. Music rights for the film are acquired by Sony Music India & Zee Music Company.

No.	Title	Singers	Length
1.	"Guddu Rangeela" (Title Track)	Amit Trivedi, Divya Kumar	04:41
2.	"Sooiyan"	Arijit Singh, Chinmayi Sripada	04:01
3.	"Sahebaan"	Chinmayi Sripada, Amit Trivedi, Shahid Mallya	03:23
4.	"Guddu Rangeela" (Remix)	Divya Kumar, Shahid Mallya	04:33
5.	"Mata Ka Email"	Gajender Phogat	02:25
Total length:			19:03
