= Hostages (Indian TV series) =

2019 Indian crime mystery thriller series

- Genre: Mystery; Crime thriller
- Based on: Hostages
- Written by: Nisarg Mehta; Shiva Bajpai; Mayukh Ghosh
- Directed by: Sudhir Mishra; (Season 1): Sachin Krishn; (Season 2)
- Starring: Ronit Roy; Tisca Chopra; Parvin Dabas; Aashim Gulati; Mohan Kapur; Dalip Tahil
- Theme music composer: Karel Antonin
- Country of origin: India
- Original language: Hindi
- No. of seasons: 2
- No. of episodes: 22

Production
- Executive producers: Rohit Philip; Sameer Rajendran
- Producers: Sameer Nair; Deepak Dhar; Deepak Segal
- Production location: India
- Running time: 25-33 Minutes
- Production companies: Applause Entertainment; Banijay Asia

Original release
- Network: Disney+ Hotstar
- Release: 31 May 2019 – 9 September 2020

Hostages is an Indian Hindi-language crime thriller series for Hotstar Specials, which is an official remake of an Israeli series of the same name. Written by Nisarg Mehta, Shiva Bajpai and Mayukh Ghosh, the series is directed by Sudhir Mishra. Starring Tisca Chopra, Ronit Roy, Parvin Dabas, Aashim Gulati, Mohan Kapoor, Dalip Tahil, with Malhaar Rathod, Sharad Joshi, Aashim Gulati, Surya Sharma and Anangsha Biswas in supporting roles. The series is about a renowned surgeon who is scheduled for a routine operation on the chief minister was ordered to assassinate him in the process, in order to save family being captivated.

Sameer Nair of Applause Entertainment brought the rights for the adaptation in April 2018, followed by the principal shooting which started in May 2018 and completed in March 2019. Marked as Sudhir Mishra's digital debut, the series was eventually premiered on Disney+ Hotstar on 31 May 2019. The series received mixed response, and although the writing was criticised, critics praised the performances of Ronit Roy and Tisca Chopra. The actors eventually won two awards at the Gold Awards (an award ceremony for television-based content) for their performances. The series was also broadcast on StarPlus in April 2020.

A second season was officially announced on 16 October 2019. The narrative of the second season eventually follows a week after the events of the first season, with the retired cop, kidnaps the chief minister for a bone marrow transplant to save his wife's life. Production of the second season began in October 2019 and ended in July 2020, despite production delays due to COVID-19 pandemic. The new season is directed by Sachin Krishn, replacing its predecessor Sudhir Mishra, who also worked on the second series. It premiered through Disney+ Hotstar on 9 September 2020.

== Premise ==
=== Season 1 ===
Surgeon Dr. Mira Anand (Tisca Chopra) is scheduled to perform a routine operation on the chief minister, but the night before the procedure, her family is taken hostage and she is ordered to assassinate her unwitting patient in order to save her family, forcing her to make a decision.

=== Season 2 ===
The story starts a week after season 1. Handa is still under captivity and the whole crew is about to move to Nepal to perform the bone marrow operation. When Handa tries to escape, an unexpected change of plan leads the team to take refuge in a dilapidated old mansion where shooting results in a hostage situation. When new players and motives behind the original plan is revealed more complex situation rises which Prithvi now has to overcome including saving his daughter's life.

== Cast ==
=== Main ===
- Ronit Roy as Superintendent of Police Prithvi Singh
- Tisca Chopra as Dr. Mira Anand (Season 1)
- Parvin Dabas as Sanjay Anand (Season 1)
- Aashim Gulati as Aman
- Mohan Kapur as Subramanian
- Dalip Tahil as CM Khushwant Lal Handa
- Anangsha Biswas as Hyma
- Shriswara as Saba Singh, Prithvi's wife
- Meenal Kapoor as Sneha (Head Nurse)
- Amit Sial as Peter George (Morgue Incharge)
- Faezeh Jalali as Sarah George
- Sharad Joshi as Shovan Anand (Season 1)
- Malhaar Rathod as Shaina Anand (Season 1)
- Anuranjan Awasthi as Aditya Sinha (Season 1)
- Md Azimul Islam Sheblu as Rony Hossain (season 1)
- Surya Sharma as Prince
- Kanwaljit Singh as Karnail Singh, head of ATS (Season 2)
- Divya Dutta as Ayesha Khan (Season 2)
- Sachin Khurana as DSP Ashwini Dutt
- Dino Morea as Ranbir (Season 2)
- Shibani Dandekar as Isha Andrews (Season 2)
- Asif Basra as Asghar Nabi (Season 2)
- Shweta Basu Prasad as Shikha Pandey (Season 2)
- Rahul Bagga as Navin
- Danish Sood as Rohan, Shikha's friend and colleague (Season 2)
- Shilpa Shukla as Shanaya Sahni (Season 2)
- Danish Husain as Arjun Bhasin / Owais (Season 2)
- Himanshi Choudhry as Kanika Arora, Journalist (season 2)

=== Recurring ===
- Manish Uppal as Naveen Khatana
- Parag Gupta as Bunty
- Megha Bestie as Girl Hostage
- Danish Kalra as Dr. Shastri
- Harish Khatri as Dr. Hingoorani
- Dalip Gulati as Doctor 1
- Shahnawaz Pradhan as Shukla
- Yusuf Hussain as Dr. Ali
- Pratik Parihar as Sniper Commando
- Richa Goswami as Avantika (CM’S Secretary)
- Saajan Malhotra as Rakesh (CM Security Guard 1)
- Dayaram Yadav as CM Security Guard 2
- Sumit Yadav as Arms Dealer
- Bhavesh Babani as Sameer Kapoor
- Palak Sindhwani as Min (Shovan’S Crush)
- Ritu as Mishra Lata (Maid)
- Manu Malik as Mahesh (Neighbour)
- Akanksha Khatri

== Episodes ==
Series	Episodes	Originally released
1	10	31 May 2019
2	12	9 September 2020

=== Season 1 ===
No.	Title	Directed by	Written by	Original release date
1	"Threat"	Sudhir Mishra	Nisarg Mehta	31 May 2019
A night before the operation of the Chief Minister of Haryana, Dr. Mira Anand, his surgeon, is held hostage along with her family by three masked men.
2	"Sabotage"	Sudhir Mishra	Nisarg Mehta	31 May 2019
It's not a usual day at the hospital. While the clock is ticking, she desperately searches for a way to buy time. It is revealed that the kidnappers have a fourth team member.
3	"Complications"	Sudhir Mishra	Nisarg Mehta	31 May 2019
At work, Mira has to deal with her old mentor's suspicion. Meanwhile, an angry neighbor shows up at the house.
4	"Gatecrasher"	Sudhir Mishra	Nisarg Mehta	31 May 2019
A new challenge presents itself and Prithvi must tie up the loose ends. As Mira and Sanjay debate over her kids' safety, an unannounced visitor arrives.
5	"Falling Apart"	Sudhir Mishra	Nisarg Mehta	31 May 2019
As Mira struggles to help a wounded Sanjay, Prithvi takes a gamble to save the day. Meanwhile, suspicion creeps into the kidnappers' team.
6	"Pieces of the Puzzle"	Sudhir Mishra	Nisarg Mehta	31 May 2019
A sudden order to be present at the station leaves Prithvi concerned. On her way to the hospital, Mira begins to penetrate Prithvi's identity.
7	"Betrayal"	Sudhir Mishra	Nisarg Mehta	31 May 2019
Mira doesn't know whom to trust, especially after she discovers the truth about Sanjay. Meanwhile, Aditya (Shaina's boyfriend) hatches a plan to escape with Shovan and Shaina, with help from Mira.
8	"Escape"	Sudhir Mishra	Nisarg Mehta	31 May 2019
Prince and Aman chase Aditya and the kids into the jungle. Aditya meets with an accident and the kids are separated. Shaina calls the number provided by Mira earlier and reaches Subramaniam, the CM's Chief of Security. At home, Sanjay does the unthinkable.
9	"Endgame"	Sudhir Mishra	Nisarg Mehta	31 May 2019
Piecing together the clues, Mira is now following a new person. Elsewhere, Sanjay and Shovan take a risk to escape while Prithvi and Subramaniam end up in a clash after it is revealed that Subramaniam had recruited Prithvi.
10	"A Matter of Choice"	Sudhir Mishra	Nisarg Mehta	31 May 2019
Prithvi has to contend with a mutiny from his crew, while Mira manages to turn the game around. Soon, she is faced with another choice, the one which was presented to her at the very beginning of the story.

=== Season 2 ===
No.	Title	Directed by	Written by	Original release date
1	"From frying pan to the fire"	Sachin Krishn	Nisarg Mehta	9 September 2020
After kidnapping Handa, Prithvi and his team are off to Nepal. However plans go awry when Handa escapes, Saba's health worsens and Subramaniam finds them.
2	"No Visual"	Sachin Krishn	Nisarg Mehta	9 September 2020
With cops and reporters swarming the abandoned mansion, Prithvi scrambles for time. Ayesha Khan brought in as hostage negotiator, establishes a communication line.
3	"The trade off"	Sachin Krishn	Nisarg Mehta	9 September 2020
Prithvi is forced to make a tough decision and demands the release of a Tihar Jail inmate, Ashgar Nabi, who's a former surgeon. But Ayesha has a card up her sleeve.
4	"Caught off guard"	Sachin Krishn	Nisarg Mehta	9 September 2020
While Prithvi helps Ashgar setup for the bone marrow transplant, Desai gets an unwelcome guest. Elsewhere Shikha smells a rat in a so-called open-and-shut case.
5	"Plan B"	Sachin Krishn	Nisarg Mehta	9 September 2020
With Ashgar completing his task, Prithvi plans an exit strategy. On the other side, Shikha pays the price for going against orders. Later Handa and Saba form a bond.
6	"Cat and Mouse"	Sachin Krishn	Nisarg Mehta	9 September 2020
When Sarah helps Prithvi, she catches unwanted attention. Meanwhile, Kanika meets an unexpected informant and Shikha comes across some crucial evidence.
7	"Sneak in, Sneak out"	Sachin Krishn	Nisarg Mehta	9 September 2020
As Peter begins to crack under the hostage crisis, an intruder breaks into Sarah's house. On the other end, Shikha and Rohan decide to spy on Isha Andrews.
8	"Beginning of the end"	Sachin Krishn	Nisarg Mehta	9 September 2020
The situation worsens when Prithvi receives a heart-stopping phone call about his daughter. Meanwhile, Handa tries to manipulate Peter into helping him.
9	"Connecting the Dots"	Sachin Krishn	Nisarg Mehta	9 September 2020
A mysterious journalist, Arjun Bhasin, arrives to cover CM Handa's funeral. Back at the mansion, Handa sheds light on his questionable deals and Ayesha keeps a close eye on Dutt.
10	"Old Friends reveal themselves"	Sachin Krishn	Nisarg Mehta	9 September 2020
As Prithvi reconnects with his old comrade, he plans to outwit Ranbir. On the other end, Arjun has an interesting encounter with a political extremist.
11	"Inching Closer"	Sachin Krishn	Nisarg Mehta	9 September 2020
When Aman and Saba struggle to escape, Prithvi joins Dutt to clear out the mansion. Rohan finds a critical lead as the conspiracy unravels more.
12	"Against the clock"	Sachin Krishn	Nisarg Mehta	9 September 2020
It's a race against time for Prithvi to save his daughter. Ayesha finds something amiss and goes with her gut feeling, and Shikha finally puts it all together.

== Production ==
=== Development ===
In April 2018, Sameer Nair, CEO of Aditya Birla Group's content studio Applause Entertainment, announced their collaboration with Armoza Formats, in order to adapt the Israeli series Hostages, La Famiglia and Honey Badgers. Sameer Nair initially slated that he has been a fan of Israeli content, due to a close cultural affinity and stated that the series have incredibly universal appeal. The team planned of filming of the series after the completion of the writing and casting process. In May 2018, the production house officially announced the details of the cast and crew members, with Sudhir Mishra being assigned to direct the series, and Ronit Roy, Tisca Chopra and Parvin Dabas were roped in for the principal cast.

I treat each and every film/show of mine as the first one, which helps me think of the plot in a new and fresh way. Hostages is one such example. It is an enthralling and captivating concept, which will hook viewers, which justifies that there is a clear demand for a show like this in the digital space. For me, every element and every person who is involved in the project forms an integral part, including the actors, producers, writer, cameraman and the whole team

— Sudhir Mishra, on directing the series, in an interview with Indo-Asian News Service

For the second season, Sudhir Mishra eventually roped in Sachin Krishn, the cinematographer of the first season as well as Sudhir's previous films. In October 2020, Sachin announced that there will be a third season.

=== Casting ===
Ronit Roy who plays the role of Prithvi Singh, a retired cop, initially accepted the script stating that the original series being hugely appreciated all over the globe. In an interview with Indo-Asian News Service, he stated "My character in the series is very intriguing. I constantly strive to keep my audiences engaged and entertained with each of my performances." Tisca Chopra who plays the role of a renowned surgeon, Dr. Mira Anand, eventually said that her character "is very demanding and it will be challenging to live up to the high hopes set by the original show." The supporting characters include Malhaar Rathod, Sharad Joshi, Aashim Gulati, Surya Sharma and Anangsha Biswas.

With Ronit being retained for the second season, Dino Morea, Shibani Dandekar, Divya Dutta and Shweta Basu Prasad, were the new addition for the cast. Some of the old members like Dalip Tahil, Surya Sharma, Aashim Gulati, Anangsha Biswas and Mohan Kapur are still a part of the series.

=== Filming ===
==== Season 1 ====
Principal shoot of the first season took place in Delhi in May 2018. The team had shot major sequences at Delhi, bracing extreme climatic conditions, as the temperature is high as 48-49 degrees. While filming the climax sequence at a National Zoological Park in New Delhi, Ronit Roy, suffered major injuries, and undergone 17 stitches in order to continue shooting. Speaking about this experience, Ronit Roy said, "It was the most difficult chase sequence towards the end of our shoot, while we shot for the climax in the national park in Delhi. It was not just me, but the entire unit was running through that forest." Shooting was wrapped up in March 2019.

==== Season 2 ====
On 16 October 2019, the series was officially renewed for a second season. Within announcement, the makers kickstarted the shooting of the series, with principal shoot being held across Delhi, Mumbai and a few scenes were shot in Nepal. However, shooting was delayed due to the COVID-19 pandemic in India, with post-production works being affected. The makers resumed the shoot in July 2020, following the necessary safety guidelines imposed by the government, to avoid the pandemic spread, and was eventually wrapped by the end of the month.

== Release ==
The series' digital distribution rights were brought by Hotstar. On 15 January 2019, the streaming platform announced that the series will be released under the label Hotstar Specials, with the production house Applause Entertainment collaborated with Hotstar to release it through first set of their original contents in March 2019. A poster which released on 13 May 2019, features Ronit Roy, taking Tisca Chopra as a hostage. But Rohit claimed that it was a suspense. On 15 May 2019, a 30-second trailer was unveiled through social media platforms, receiving positive response. The first season of the series was released on Hotstar on 31 May 2019, in Hindi, Tamil, Telugu, Malayalam, Kannada, Bengali and Marathi languages.

In April 2020, Star Plus announced for a premiere of the web series, as the shooting of television shows were affected due to the COVID-19 pandemic lockdown in India, eventually halting the premiere of new episodes in television. The series consisting of 10-episodes was premiered at the channel in the 10:30 p.m. IST slot, which eventually belonged to the paranormal thriller Nazar 2, for the same channel. With this, Hostages became the first Hotstar Specials series to be premiered directly on television. Commenting on this Ronit Roy stated, "The good part is that people get it to watch it for free. If they enjoy it, they might subscribe to Hotstar. The section of people, who only watch traditional TV, who do not have access to OTT platforms, will get to watch the show. If they like it, some of them might go to OTT to watch the second season. Its a win-win situation in both ways."

The second season of the series was eventually scheduled to be released in May 2020, but delayed as the work in post-production got interrupted due to the COVID-19 pandemic in India. On 31 August 2020, the official trailer of the second season was released through social media platforms, receiving positive response from fans. The series premiered through Disney+ Hotstar on 9 September 2020.

== Reception ==
=== Critical response ===
==== Season 1 ====
The first season of the series eventually received mixed response from critics. Archika Khurana, writing for The Times of India, gave three out of five stars and stated "The series tries too hard to be an edge-of-the-seat thriller by relying solely on performances, instead, the makers should have worked on coming up with a tighter script." Bloomberg Quint's Karishma Upadhyay, rated the same and wrote "A riveting home-invasion drama at its core, Hostages keeps you rooted to your seat with its twists and turns, but also leaves you a little baffled with the unreal lives of its characters." Shweta Kesari of India Today, commented "Ronit Roy, Tisca Chopra starrer is intriguing in parts but fails to hold the interest of its viewers."

Sonali Kokra of Firstpost gave two out of five and summarised "Hostages is honest to a fault about sticking to its mandate of being the official Hindi adaptation of a hit Israeli show by the same name. Like the original, the first season of the Hindi iteration is exactly 10 episodes long, each one recreated almost scene for scene, with scarcely any alterations in the dialogue or the screenplay. But while the original was saved from drowning in the absurdities of its script by stellar acting and a determined cast, the Hindi version offers no such respite." Sowmya Srivatsava of Hindustan Times rated the series, one-and-a-half out of five and summarised "Hostages is a generic thriller that offers nothing new in terms of the story it tells, the characters it introduces, the way it is shot or even the themes it plays with."

==== Season 2 ====
The second season received mixed response. Archika Khuaran of The Times of India, gave three out of five stars and stated "The series has no dull moments owing to the ample twists-and-turns that keep the momentum going. The show is engaging and keeps its audience hooked while the battle between the both sides are on." Pradeep Menon of Firstpost gave three out of five and stated "Hostages is the sort of show that takes generous liberties with logic and possibilities, but that hardly comes in the way of you moving to the next episode." Udita Jhunjhunwala, writing for Scroll.in commented "A bunch of guest appearances, some unexpected returning characters and a lot of going round in circles later, the season ends with a dramatic climax, which should satisfy fans of Hostages." Gaurang Chauhan of Zoom TV, gave three-and-a-half out of five stars and commented "Hostages season 2 is a worthy sequel to the thrilling season 1."

In contrast, Ektaa Malik of The Indian Express gave one-and-a-half out of five and summarised "Hostages Season 2 is a wasted effort. There are plenty of twists of turns, and if done well, the show could have been a binge-worthy, edge-of-the-seat thriller." Saraswati Datar of The News Minute commented "Hostages Season 2 has too many distractions and plot entanglements to keep us invested in the ‘hostages’ and their safety for 12 long episodes." Gauthaman Bhaskaran of News18 gave two out of five and stated "Hostages 2 seems stretched, with the rest of the story in not only as predictable, but has incidents that are uncomfortably distracting." Namrata Thakkar of Rediff gave two-and-a-half out of five and commented "Hostages 2 is not as crisp and engaging as season one. But the show is still worth watching once because of Ronit Roy and a few other fine performances."

=== Awards and nominations ===
Year	Award	Category	Recipient	Result
2019	iReel Awards	Best Actor (Drama)	Ronit Roy	Nominated
2019	Gold Awards	Best Actor	Ronit Roy	Won
2019	Gold Awards	Best Actress	Tisca Chopra	Won
2019	Gold Awards	Best Drama Series	Hostages	Won

== See also ==
- Tanaav
