= Kaabil =

2017 Indian film by Sanjay Gupta

- Theatrical release poster
- Directed by: Sanjay Gupta
- Screenplay by: Vijay Kumar Mishra
- Dialogues by: Sanjay Masoom
- Story by: Vijay Kumar Mishra
- Produced by: Rakesh Roshan
- Starring: Hrithik Roshan; Yami Gautam; Ronit Roy; Rohit Roy
- Cinematography: Sudeep Chatterjee; Ayananka Bose
- Edited by: Akiv Ali
- Music by: Songs: Rajesh Roshan; Score: Salim–Sulaiman
- Production company: Filmkraft Productions Pvt. Ltd
- Distributed by: Filmkraft Productions Pvt. Ltd; B4U Motion Pictures
- Release date: 25 January 2017
- Running time: 139 minutes
- Country: India
- Language: Hindi
- Budget: ₹35 crore
- Box office: est. ₹208.14 crore

Kaabil (transl. Capable) is a 2017 Indian Hindi-language action-thriller film directed by Sanjay Gupta, written by Vijay Kumar Mishra, and produced by Rakesh Roshan under his banner FilmKraft Productions. The film stars Hrithik Roshan, Yami Gautam, Ronit Roy and Rohit Roy. The film’s soundtrack is composed by Rajesh Roshan. Principal photography began on 30 March 2016.

The film follows a blind dubbing artist who becomes disillusioned when his wife faces injustice and dies. He becomes a vigilante and decides to seek revenge against those responsible for his wife's death, while also dodging police with a cover that no one would believe a blind man can kill someone. Kaabil was released theatrically on 25 January 2017, and received mixed reviews from critics. Roshan was nominated for the Filmfare Award for Best Actor for his performance at the 63rd Filmfare Awards.

== Plot ==
Rohan Bhatnagar is a kind young man who has been blind since birth and works as an animation voice actor for a living. Through his friends, he meets Supriya, a working woman who is also blind, but proudly independent. The two fall in love and get married. One night, on their way back home after dining out, they are interrupted by Amit Shellar, a local goon and younger brother of Madhavrao Shellar, a well-known politician. He and his friend, Wasim, drunkenly misbehave with the couple, enraging Rohan. The next morning while Rohan is at work, Amit and Wasim sneak into the house and gang rape Supriya. A horrified Rohan immediately calls the police; officer Chaubey advises him to get his wife medically examined in 24 hours to prove the assault. While Rohan and Supriya are on their way to the clinic, they are kidnapped by Shellar's men and held captive for 36 hours.

After being set free, Rohan and Supriya are criticized by police for the delay in getting Supriya clinically examined, and are accused of being liars. Heartbroken, they return home. Supriya attempts to live normally but Rohan becomes silent and introspective, which hurts her. One morning, Rohan returns early from work to apologize to Supriya for not being as supportive as he should have, only to find her corpse, hanging from the ceiling fan. Madhavrao visits Rohan and reveals that his brother Amit raped Supriya not once but twice. Rohan finds Supriya's suicide note, which ascertains that Amit and Wasim had gang raped her a second time; this second assault led to her suicide. Shattered, Rohan implies to officer Chaubey that he will avenge his wife's death, mocking Chaubey that he will know who did it but will be able to do nothing about it, just like he did nothing about Supriya's case.

Rohan uses his voice-modulating skills to lure the culprits to places that Rohan knows well. First, he tricks Wasim and hangs him, leaving Amit's handkerchief behind to frame Amit. He then lures Amit to the warehouse where he and Supriya were held captive for 36 hours. He finds Amit by scent, tying him down to be burned alive in an explosion. Chaubey suspects Rohan of Amit and Wasim's murders and puts him under house arrest. Rohan gets past the police with the help of his friend and calls Madhavrao to a building under construction that was to be Rohan and Supriya's new home. There, Rohan kills him and makes it look like a suicide. Rohan later relates the story to Chaubey: he made it look as if Amit killed Wasim, then Madhavrao committed suicide due to the pain of Amit's death. With no evidence against Rohan, a blind man, Chaubey stands helpless. After this, Rohan scatters Supriya's ashes in the sea.

== Cast ==
- Hrithik Roshan as Rohan Bhatnagar
- Yami Gautam as Supriya Sharma / Supriya Bhatnagar
- Ronit Roy as Madhavrao Shellar
- Rohit Roy as Amit Shellar
- Narendra Jha as Inspector Amol Chaube
- Suresh Menon as Zafar, Rohan's friend
- Sahidur Rahman as Wasim
- Akhilendra Mishra as Wasim's father
- Girish Kulkarni as Sub-Inspector Pravin Nalavde
- Urvashi Rautela as a dancer in the item number "Haseeno Ka Deewana" (special appearance)
- Shaji Chaudhary as Anna

== Production ==
=== Development ===
Sanjay Gupta announced the film in January 2016 with Hrithik Roshan portraying the lead role. Rakesh Roshan was confirmed to be producing the project under his production banner FilmKraft Productions Pvt. Ltd, with his brother Rajesh Roshan composing the soundtrack. Yami Gautam was confirmed to play the lead heroine while brothers Ronit Roy and Rohit Roy were confirmed to play negative roles in the film. Resul Pookutty was the sound designer, while the cinematography was handled by Sudeep Chatterjee and Ayananka Bose.

=== Filming ===
Principal photography commenced in Mumbai in March 2016. Filming was concluded in July 2016.

== Release ==
Kaabil was released on 25 January 2017 worldwide, clashing with Raees. On 2 February 2017, Kaabil was released across Pakistan, becoming the first Indian film to be screened in Pakistan, post lifting of ban on Indian films after the 2016 Uri terror attack and its aftermath. It was released in Hindi along with its Tamil dubbed version titled Balam.

Following the good performance of the film at the box-office, the film was released on around 200 more screens in India, on 2 February 2017. Kaabil was released in China on 5 June 2019 but performed weakly upon its release. A sequel is reportedly in development with Roshan set to reprise his role.

== Reception ==
=== Critical response ===
Taran Adarsh of Bollywood Hungama gave the film 4 out of 5 stars and wrote, "On the whole, Kaabil is gripping, gut-wrenching and is likely to stay with you for a long time." The Indian Express gave the film 1.5 out of 5 stars and wrote, "Hrithik does all the heavy lifting and remains the only bright spot in this dispirited mess of a movie. He still has the moves. What he needs is a plot." Meena Iyer of Times of India gave the film 4/5 stars, noting that the movie seemed to be inspired by the 1989 movie Blind Fury and the 2014 Korean movie Broken. Iyer praised Roshan's performance as his "all-time best", and felt that the character Rohan was "vulnerable as a lover and menacing as a killing-machine". Sarita A. Tanwar of Daily News and Analysis gave 4/5 stars writing "Kaabil is old-school, emotional and forceful. And an absolute must for all Hrithik Roshan fans. And if you aren't his fan, you might feel differently after this film".

Writing for The Hindu, Namrata Joshi gave the film 2 out of 5 stars and called it a "predictable revenge and retribution saga that offers nothing new other than the visually impaired protagonists." Rachit Gupta from Filmfare gave 3 out of 5 stars and wrote "Hrithik carries this film on his capable shoulders. His perfectly nuanced performance is the reason you’ll enjoy the thrills of Kaabil". Bollywood Bubble gave 4 out of 5 stars and wrote, "‘Kaabil’ will present you a far bitter truth. It'll draw a very uncomfortable, shrewd reality wherein the ones in greater need of support are the ones often thrown on the edge, laughed at. It'll show you a world in desperate need of more compassion, more kindness." Joginder Tuteja of Movie Talkies gave 4/5 stars and wrote, "Rakesh Roshan has ensured that Kaabil turns out to be a commercial film for the audiences that has all the right ingredients in place and that too in the right proportions. It must have been quite a challenge to have three creative brains (Sanjay, Hrithik and himself) to blend seamlessly and deliver a product which is in just the right synch. That happens with Kaabil and that is the right reason why the final outcome keeps you glued on the screen right till the end."

Business Standard criticized the film's plot and direction: "I’m not sure what’s more infuriating about this film – whether it’s regressive or stupid. Or whether it’s regressive and stupid and joyless and monotonous and silly and pointless. In fact, let’s call Kaabil for what it is: a B-movie with well-known actors. Worse, it’s exacerbated by shoddy CG, fake earnestness and a needless item number." Udita Jhunjhunwala from First Post gave 3 out of 5 stars and wrote, "If you are able to look past many of these niggles it's thank to Hrithik Roshan's committed performance which keeps you rooting for his Rohan all the way." Sukanya Varma from Rediff.com gave the film 2.5 out of 5 stars, writing "Kaabil serves nothing beyond an unabashed platform to vaunt a seething Hrithik, sentimental Hrithik, snarky Hrithik, sly Hrithik or spry Hrithik...". Saibal Chaterjee from NDTV gave 2.5 out of 5 stars, calling the film "...paisa vasool (transl. worth the money) fare, if not more." Mike McCahill from The Guardian gave the film 2 out of 5 stars, and remarked that "Sanjay Gupta's tale of a blind dubbing artist avenging the ghost of his wife is the sort of nonsense the Indian film industry stopped churning out 20 years ago."

== Soundtrack ==
Kaabil

Soundtrack album by Rajesh Roshan
- Released: 21 December 2016
- Recorded: 2016
- Genre: Feature film soundtrack
- Length: 24:37
- Language: Hindi
- Label: T-Series
- Director: Sanjay Gupta
- Producer: Rakesh Roshan

Rajesh Roshan chronology
Krrish 3 (2013)	Kaabil (2016)

The soundtrack album was released on 21 December 2016 by T-Series.

The soundtrack was composed by Rajesh Roshan. The song "Haseeno Ka Deewana" is a cover version of "Sara Zamana" from Roshan's original soundtrack to the film Yaarana (1981). The original Yaarana version was sung by Kishore Kumar, and featured Amitabh Bachchan and Neetu Singh in the music video. The Kaabil cover version is sung by Payal Dev with rapper Raftaar, while the music video is an item number featuring Urvashi Rautela.

All music is composed by Rajesh Roshan.

Track listing
No.	Title	Lyrics	Singer(s)	Length
1.	"Kaabil Hoon"	Nasir Faraaz	Jubin Nautiyal, Palak Muchhal	5:14
2.	"Haseeno Ka Deewana"	Kumaar, Anjaan	Payal Dev, Raftaar	3:49
3.	"Kuch Din"	Manoj Muntashir	Jubin Nautiyal	4:48
4.	"Mon Amour"	Manoj Muntashir	Vishal Dadlani	4:59
5.	"Kaabil Hoon" (Sad Version)	Nasir Faraaz	Jubin Nautiyal	1:37
6.	"Kisi Se Pyar Ho Jaye"	Kumaar, Anand Bakshi	Jubin Nautiyal	4:10
Total length:				24:37
