= Itna Karo Na Mujhe Pyaar =

Indian television series

- Genre: Soap opera
- Created by: Ekta Kapoor
- Developed by: Balaji Telefilms
- Screenplay by: Vipul Mehta; Nivedita Basu; Soham Abhiram; Dialogues; Dheeraj Sarna; Shirish Laktar; Reena pareek
- Story by: Vipul Mehta; Nivedita Basu; Soham Abhiram
- Directed by: Anil V. Kumar; Mujammil Desai; Rishi Tyagi; Kamal Monga; Partho Mitra; Lalit Marathe; Santram Varma
- Starring: See below
- Theme music composer: Lalit Sen
- Opening theme: "Itna Karo Na Mujhe Pyaar" by Pamela Jain
- Country of origin: India
- Original language: Hindi
- No. of seasons: 1
- No. of episodes: 208

Production
- Producers: Ekta Kapoor; Shobha Kapoor
- Cinematography: Ashish Sharma
- Editors: Vikas Sharma; Vishal Sharma; Sandeep Bhatt; Online Editor(s); Vatan Singh; Ramlochan Pandey; Gopal Rai; Jasveer Jatia
- Camera setup: Multi-camera
- Running time: 30 minutes
- Production company: Balaji Telefilms

Original release
- Network: Sony TV; Zee TV
- Release: 18 November 2014 – 17 November 2015

Itna Karo Na Mujhe Pyaar (transl. Don't Love Me So Much) is an Indian Hindi-language television soap opera which premiered on Sony Entertainment Television And Zee TV. Produced by Balaji Telefilms, the show deals with the relationship challenges of a divorced couple and how they remain connected because of their children.

== Plot ==
Ragini Patel is a divorcée and lives with her two children Nishi and Aarav and her mother Asha and grandmother Bakula Nani. She is a strong and independent woman who works in a hospital as an administrative head under the hospital owner Dr. Aman Malhotra.

Dr. Neil Khanna, who is Ragini's ex-husband, lives in New York City with his three children Ranbir, Agham, Suhani and his sister Pam. Aarav, Nishi and her fiancé Jignesh find out that Neil lives in New York City. They insisted Neil to come to India to attend Nishi's marriage. Later after clearing the misunderstandings Neil and Ragini decide to live together again but due to circumstances they get separated.

== Cast ==
=== Main ===
- Ronit Roy as Dr. Nachiket "Neil" Khanna: Ragini's husband; Ranbir, Nishi, Aarav and Agham's father; Suhani's adoptive father; Poonam's elder brother
- Pallavi Kulkarni as Ragini Patel Khanna: Nachiket's wife; Ranbir, Nishi, Aarav and Agham's mother; Suhani's adoptive mother
- Avinash Mukherjee as Dr. Ranbir Khanna: Ragini and Nachiket's eldest son; Nishi, Aarav and Agham's brother; Suhani's adoptive brother
- Rhea Sharma / Vinny Arora as Nishi Khanna Shah: Ragini and Nachiket's daughter; Ranbir, Aarav and Agham's sister; Suhani's adoptive sister; Jignesh's wife
- Yatin Mehta as Arav Khanna: Ragini and Nachiket's second son; Ranbir and Nishi's brother; Agham's twin brother; Suhani's adoptive brother
- Rohan Shah as Agham Khanna: Ragini and Nachiket's youngest son; Ranbir and Nishi's brother; Arav's twin brother; Suhani's adoptive brother
- Palak Jain as Suhani Khanna: Rupali and Ronnie's daughter; Ragini and Nachiket's adopted daughter; Ranbir, Nishi, Aarav and Agham's adoptive sister

=== Recurring ===
- Ashwini Kalsekar as Poonam "Pam" Khanna: Nachiket's sister
- Sayantani Ghosh as Nivedita Basu: Rupali's sister; Aman's wife; Nachiket's ex-fianceé
- Darshan Pandya as Dr. Aman Malhotra: Nivedita's husband; Ragini's ex-fiancè
- Mehul Vyas as Jignesh Shah: Nishi's husband
- Kishwer Merchant as Dimpy Kapoor: Karan's wife; Nachiket's friend
- Ashwin Mushran as Karan Kapoor: Dimpy's husband; Nachiket's friend
- Anurag Sharma as Ram "RK" Kapoor: Karan's younger brother
- Kirti Sually as Asha Patel: Ragini's mother; Ranbir, Nishi, Aarav and Agham's grandmother; Suhani's adoptive grandmother
- Induben Mehta as Bakula: Asha's mother, Ragini's grandmother; Ranbir, Nishi, Aarav and Agham's great-grandmother
- Jyothi Joshi as Sunny Tai: Patel's househelp
- Mihika Verma as Rupali Basu: Nivedita's sister; Ronnie's wife; Suhani's mother
- Rushad Rana as Ronnie: Rupali's husband; Suhani's father
- Kuki Grewal as Dr. Devika Mehra
- Ashish Juneja as Dr. Karthik Kumar
- Kalyani Thakkar as Sushila Shah: Jignesh's mother
- Rose Sardana as Suman
- Snehal Pandey as Shilpa: Kuki's daughter; Ranbir and Arav's love interest
- Ritu Vijj as Kuki: Shilpa's mother
- Bhavin Bhanushali as Akash: Arav's friend

=== Guest appearances ===
- Bhanujeet Sudan as Babu Bhai
- Vidya Balan as herself, to promote Hamari Adhuri Kahani
- Pratyusha Banerjee as herself in a dance performance
- Mona Singh as herself in a dance performance
- Aishwarya Sakhuja as herself in a dance performance
- Shabir Ahluwalia as Abhishek (Abhi) Prem Mehra from Kumkum Bhagya
- Sriti Jha as Pragya Arora Mehra from Kumkum Bhagya
- Karanvir Bohra as Aahil from Qubool Hai
- Surbhi Jyoti as Sana from Qubool Hai
- Piyush Sahdev as Kabir (K.T) Tripathi from Sapne Suhane Ladakpan Ke
- Mahima Makwana as Rachna Garg Tripathi from Sapne Suhane Ladakpan Ke
- Ankit Gera as Mayank Garg from Sapne Suhane Ladakpan Ke
- Roopal Tyagi as Gunjan Garg from Sapne Suhane Ladakpan Ke

== Adaptation ==
Language	Title	Original release	Network(s)	Last aired	Notes
Hindi	Itna Karo Na Mujhe Pyaar इतना करो ना मुझे प्यार	18 November 2014	Sony Entertainment Television	17 November 2015	Original
Tamil	Meera மீரா	28 March 2022	Colors Tamil	22 July 2022	Inspired

== Awards ==
- 2015 Star Guild Awards Best Actor in a Drama Series Ronit Roy
