= Ronit Roy =

Indian actor (born 1965)

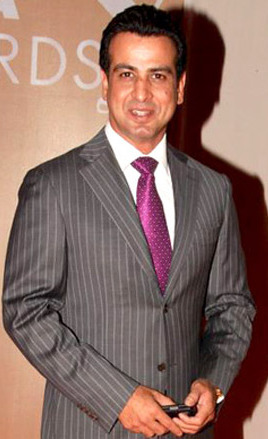
- Roy in 2010
- Born: Ronit Bose Roy; 11 October 1965 (age 61); Nagpur, Maharashtra, India
- Occupations: Actor; businessman
- Years active: 1986–present
- Spouses: Joanna Mumtaz Khan (divorced); Neelam Singh Roy (m. 2003)
- Children: 3
- Relatives: Rohit Roy (brother); Manasi Joshi Roy (sister-in-law)
- Awards: Full list

Ronit Bose Roy (born 11 October 1965) is an Indian actor who works primarily in Hindi television and films and Bengali films. He is known for portraying Rishabh Bajaj in Kasautii Zindagii Kay, Mihir Virani in Kyunki Saas Bhi Kabhi Bahu Thi and the advocate K. D. Pathak in Adaalat. One of the highest paid television actors in India, he has earned numerous accolades including a Filmfare Award, five ITA Awards, and six Indian Telly Awards.

== Early life and background ==
Roy was born on 11 October 1965 in Nagpur, Maharashtra in a Bengali family. He is the eldest son of a businessman, Brotin Bose Roy and Dolly Roy. His younger brother, Rohit Roy is also a TV and a film actor. Ronit Roy spent his childhood in Ahmedabad, Gujarat. He received primary education from Ankur School, Ahmedabad. After his schooling, Roy pursued hotel management. After completing his studies, he moved to Mumbai and stayed at the residence of filmmaker Subhash Ghai. While Roy was keen to work in the film industry, Subhash Ghai persuaded him, not to pursue it due to the difficulties associated with it. Ronit worked as a management trainee at Mumbai's Sea Rock Hotel. To have experience at all different levels, Ronit's work ranged from dishwashing and cleaning to serving tables and bar-tending.

== Career ==
=== Film career ===
Roy made his debut in the Hindi film industry with Jaan Tere Naam (1992) which was a commercial success. He starred with Aditya Pancholi and Kishori Shahane in Bomb Blast (1993). which was also a commercial success.

After his success on TV, Roy featured in more Hindi films in supporting roles. In 2010, he starred in the critically acclaimed film Udaan; his work was much praised and won him many accolades. Roy's performance was ranked among the 100 greatest performances of the decade list by Film Companion.

Udaan brought Roy back to the film scene. He next starred in films such as Anurag Kashyap's That Girl in Yellow Boots, Karan Johar's Student of the Year, Deepa Mehta's Midnight's Children, Sanjay Gupta's Shootout at Wadala (produced by Ekta Kapoor), and Anurag Kashyap's Ugly.

In 2013, he played the main antagonist in the Akshay Kumar starrer BOSS, and in 2014 he appeared in 2 States in which his performance received much appreciation.

In 2017, he has also shared screen with the Hrithik Roshan playing the role of an antagonist in the thriller film Kaabil. In the same year, he made his debut in Telugu with N.T.R Jr. starrer Jai Lava Kusa, where he played the role of main antagonist Sarkar. He has also appeared in films like Machine (2017), Lucknow Central (2017), and Loveyatri (2018).

Roy was seen next in Puri Jagannadh directed romantic sports film Liger (2022). In 2023, he played the antagonist in Gumraah and Bloody Daddy.

=== TV career ===
Roy received a call from Balaji Telefilms to offer him a part in the television serial Kammal. Due to the lack of any appealing film offers, he accepted the offer. Before Kammal got started, Balaji Telefilms also offered Ronit for Kasautii Zindagii Kay as Rishabh Bajaj, a middle-aged business tycoon. That also landed him in Balaji Telefilms' Kyunki Saas Bhi Kabhi Bahu Thi as Mihir Virani, which won him consecutive Best Actor Popular awards at the Indian Television Academy Awards.

From 2009 to 2011, he played the role of Dharamraj in NDTV Imagine's Bandini, which won him accolades for his astonishing portrayal of a crude and ruthless diamond merchant who is never defeated.

He has also participated in Jhalak Dikhhla Jaa, a dance reality show in 2007, and another show, Yeh Hai Jalwa in 2008 as a contestant. He hosted the Kitchen Champions in 2010 which was on Colors TV.

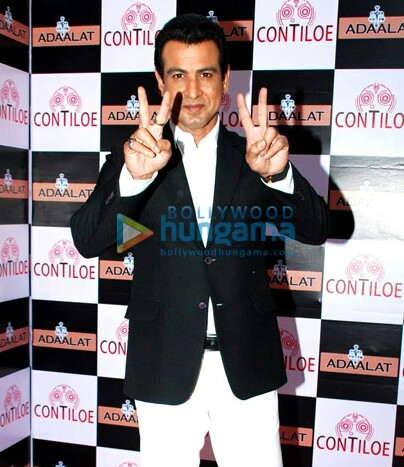
Ronit Roy at Adaalat's 400 episodes celebration.

In 2010, he starred in Sony TV's popular courtroom drama show Adaalat as K.D. Pathak, a sharp unique lawyer who only fights for the truth.

He returned to the drama genre in 2014 with Balaji Telefilms's Itna Karo Na Mujhe Pyar as Dr. Nachiket Khanna, alias Neil K opposite Pallavi Kulkarni.

In 2016, he starred in Adaalat (season 2) where he reprised his character from the previous season.

=== Digital career ===
In 2018, Roy made his digital debut in an ALTBalaji's web series Kehne Ko Humsafar Hain along with Mona Singh and Gurdeep Kohli.

In 2019, he starred in an Indian crime thriller web series Hostages.

== Other work and media image ==
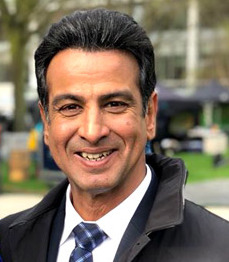
Roy in 2018

With his performances in Kasautii Zindagi Kay, Kyunki Saas Bhi Kabhi Bahu Thi, Bandini, Adaalat and Itna Karo Na Mujhe Pyaar, Roy established himself among the leading and highest-paid actors of Hindi television. In 2014, Roy was placed ninth in Rediff.com's "Top Television Actors" list. His performance in Udaan is regarded as one of the "100 Greatest Performances of the Decade" by Film Companion.

Roy owns Ace Security and Protection agency (AceSquad Security Services LLP). It currently caters to Bollywood actors such as Salman Khan, Amitabh Bachchan, Mithun Chakraborty, Shah Rukh Khan, and Aamir Khan and recently Saif Ali khan; also to Indian Premier League ex-Chairman and ex-Commissioner Lalit Modi and his son Ruchir Modi. Some of the film projects that Ace Security and Protection have also lent their services to are Lagaan, Dil Chahta Hai, Yaadein, Na Tum Jano Na Hum, Saathiya, and Armaan.

== Personal life ==
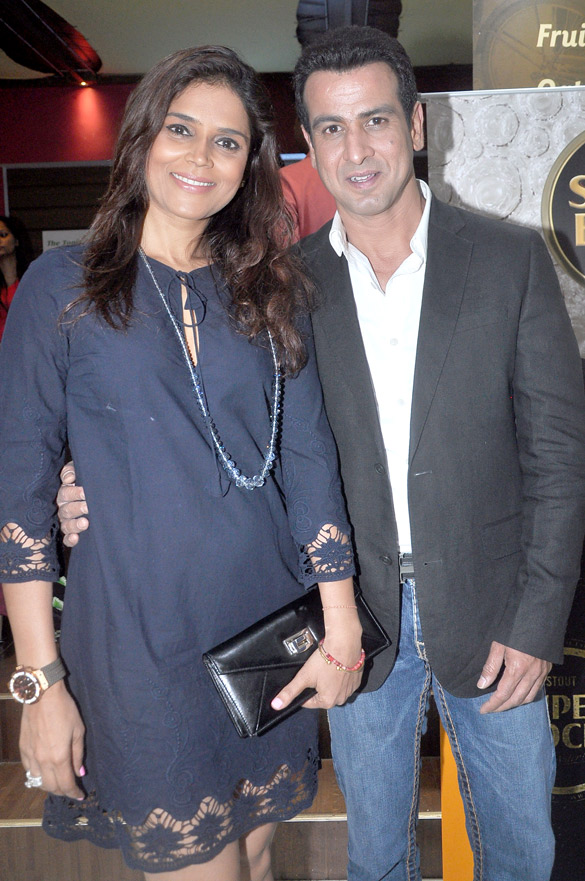
Ronit Roy with his wife Neelam Singh-Roy in 2012

Roy was married to a woman named Joanna Mumtaz Khan, and they have a daughter named Ona.

On 25 December 2003, he married actress and model Neelam Singh, with whom he has a daughter Aador (born May 2005), and a son Agastya (born October 2007).

== Filmography ==
Key
†	Denotes films that have not yet been released

=== Films ===
Year	Title	Role	Language	Notes	Ref(s)
1992	Jaan Tere Naam	Sunil Sharma	Hindi		
1993	Bomb Blast	Inspector Jaikishen Verma	Hindi		
1993	Andha Intaquam		Hindi		
1993	Sainik	Vijay Ghai	Hindi		
1993	15 August	Vikram Chaudhary	Hindi		
1993	Dosti Ki Saugandh		Hindi		
1993	Tahqiqaat	Ramesh Kumar	Hindi		
1994	Laqshya		Hindi		
1995	Hulchul	Vardaan "Karan" Rajvanshi	Hindi		
1995	Rock Dancer	Rakesh Dhawan	Hindi		
1996	Jurmana	Sanjay Saxena	Hindi		
1996	Jagannath	Ajay Kapoor	Hindi		
1996	Megha	Prakash Pant Pandey	Hindi		
1996	Army	Govind Gavin	Hindi		
1996	Daanveer	Vishal Srivastav	Hindi		
1999	Jaalsaaz	Rakesh Kumar			
1999	Agni Shikha	Prodipta Roy	Bengali		
2000	Glamour Girl	Sunil Verma	Hindi		
2000	Atangko	Raja	Bengali		
2001	Hum Deewane Pyar Ke	Vijay Chatterjee	Hindi		
2001	Khatron Ke Khiladi	Bambass Khilauji	Hindi		
2002	Shesh Bongshodor (Last Descendant)	Bongshodor Paremton	Bengali	Indo-Bangladeshi film	
2003	Roktobondhon	Joydeep "Joy" Sehni	Bengali		
2005	Nishan – The Target	Abdullah Khan	Hindi		
2005	Kisna: The Warrior Poet	Jimmy Duryaaj	Hindi	Cameo appearance	
2009	Luck by Chance	Himself	Hindi	Cameo appearance	
2010	Pankh	Peter D'Cunha	Hindi	Cameo appearance	
2010	Udaan	Bhairav Singh	Hindi		
2011	That Girl in Yellow Boots	Dushyant Sharma	Hindi	Cameo appearance	
2012	Midnight's Children	Ahmed Sinai	Hindi		
2012	Student of the Year	Coach Karan Shah	Hindi		
2013	Shootout at Wadala	Inspector Raja Ambat	Hindi		
2013	Boss	Ayushman Thakur	Hindi		
2014	2 States	Vikram Malhotra	Hindi		
2014	Ugly	Shaumik Bose	Hindi		
2015	Guddu Rangeela	Billu Pehelwan	Hindi		
2016	Dongari Ka Raja	Mansoor Ali	Hindi		
2017	Kaabil	Madhavrao Shellar	Hindi		
2017	Sarkar 3	Gokul Satam	Hindi		
2017	Machine	Balraj Thapar	Hindi		
2017	Jai Lava Kusa	Sarkar Toropantre	Telugu		
2017	Munna Michael	Michael	Hindi		
2017	Lucknow Central	Raja Shrivastava	Hindi		
2018	Loveyatri	Sameer "Sam" Patel	Hindi		
2018	Thugs of Hindostan	Mirza Sikander Baig	Hindi		
2019	Line of Descent	Prithvi Sinha	Hindi		
2019	Arjun Patiala	IPS Amarjeet Singh Gill	Hindi		
2021	Bhoomi	Richard Child	Tamil		
2022	Shamshera	Pir Baba	Hindi		
2022	Liger	Coach	Hindi; Telugu	Bilingual film	
2023	Shehzada	Randeep Jindal	Hindi		
2023	Gumraah	ACP Dhiren Yadav	Hindi		
2023	Bloody Daddy	Sikandar Chowdhary	Hindi		
2023	Farrey	Ishrat Kada	Hindi		
2024	Yodha	Major Surender Katyal	Hindi		
2024	Bade Miyan Chote Miyan	Colonel Adil Shekhar Azad / Clone Azad	Hindi		
2025	Maa	Joydev	Hindi		

=== Television ===
Year	Title	Role	Notes	Ref(s)
1997	Bombay Blue	Dillip Bhatt	Cameo appearance	
1999	Baat Ban Jaye			
1999	Nagin	Ronit		
2000	Suraag – The Clue			
2000	Star Bestsellers			
2002–2003	Kammal	Swayam		
2002–2008	Kasautii Zindagi Kay	Rishabh Bajaj		
2002–2008	Kyunki Saas Bhi Kabhi Bahu Thi	Mihir Virani		
2003	Ssshhhh...Koi Hai		Episodic role	
2004	Kkehna Hai Kuch Mujhko	Ishan Masand		
2004	Vikraal Aur Gabraal		Episodic role	
2004	Krisshna Arjun	Anna / Vijay	Episodic role	
2005	Kkavyanjali	Mayank Nanda	Cameo appearance	
2005	Sarkarr:Rishton Ki Ankahi Kahani	Kunal Pratapsingh		
2006–2009	Kasamh Se	Aparajit Deb		
2007	Kayamath	Inder Shah		
2007	Jhalak Dikhhla Jaa	Contestant		
2008	Yeh Hain Jalwa	Contestant		
2008	Kahaani Hamaaray Mahaabhaarat Ki	Bhishma		
2008	Aajaa Mahi Vay	Judge		
2009–2011	Bandini	Dharamraj Mahyavanshi		
2010	Kitchen Champion	Host	Nominated—Indian Telly Award for Best Anchor (2010)	
2010–2016	Adaalat	Advocate K.D. Pathak		
2014–2015	Itna Karo Na Mujhe Pyaar	Dr. Neil K/ Nachiket Khanna		
2015	Deal Ya No Deal	Host		
2016	24	Roy	Guest appearance	
2019	Naagin 3	Rohit Mehra	Guest appearance; To promote Kehne Ko Humsafar Hain 2	
2019	Shakti - Astitva Ke Ehsaas Ki	Advocate Rajat Singh		
2019	Yeh Rishtey Hain Pyaar Ke	SP Prithvi Singh	Guest appearance; To promote Hostages	
2021	Jurm Aur Jazbaat	Host		
2022	Swaran Ghar	Kanwaljeet Bedi		
2025	Chakravarti Samrat Prithviraj Chauhan	Maharaj Someshvara		
2026	Teen Kauwe †	TBA	Amazon Prime Video series	

=== Web series ===
Year	Title	Role	Notes	Ref.
2018–2020	Kehne Ko Humsafar Hain	Rohit Mehra	3 seasons	
2019–2020	Hostages	Prithvi Singh		
2021	Saat Kadam	Aurobindo		
2021	Candy	Jayant Parekh		

== See also ==
- List of Indian television actors
- List of Indian film actors
- List of Hindi television actors
