= Bandini (TV series) =

- Title Montage of Bandini
- Genre: Drama
- Written by: R M Joshi; Binita Desai; Swati Pande; Emraan; Mahesh Pandey; Vipul Mehta; Anand Vardhan; Manish Paliwal
- Directed by: Santram Varma; Kaushik Ghatak; Ronit Roy; Partho Mitra; Ravindra Gautam; Santosh Bhatt; Vikrant Parmar; Santosh Kohle; Praveen Suden; Suraj Rao; Hemant Prabhu; Qaeed Kuwajerwala; Fahad Kashmiri; Ashish Shrivastav; Maqbool Khan; Deepak Chavan
- Creative director: Sandip Sikcand
- Starring: See below
- Opening theme: "Bandini" by Richa Tripathi
- Country of origin: India
- Original language: Hindi
- No. of episodes: 520

Production
- Producers: Ekta Kapoor; Shobha Kapoor
- Cinematography: Mahesh Talkad; Sanjay Malwankar
- Editors: Nishit Shah; Vikas Sharma; Khursheed Rizvi; Prem Raaj; Rajeev Yadav
- Camera setup: Multi-camera
- Running time: 20 minutes
- Production company: Balaji Telefilms

Original release
- Network: Imagine TV
- Release: 19 January 2009 – 29 January 2011

Bandini (transl. female prisoner) is an Indian soap opera produced by Ekta Kapoor of Balaji Telefilms. It starred Ronit Roy, Aasiya Kazi, Mrunal Jain, Leena Jumani, Shardul Pandit and Kunal Thakkur and was set against the backdrop of Gujarat in Dharampur a village near Surat in Gujarat. The show premiered on 19 January 2009 and ended on 29 January 2011 on NDTV Imagine.

== Plot ==
Santu Waghela is a poor but spirited girl who lives in the village of Dharampur with her maternal grandfather, Madhav Solanki, an experienced diamond cutter working for the middle-aged diamond merchant Dharamraj Mahiyavanshi As an incentive to his best worker, Dharamraj offers to arrange and sponsor Madhav's granddaughter's marriage. Hours before the wedding, the bridegroom backs out and Madhav's fellow workers get agitated. Dharamraj, a widower, comes forward to marry the bride, Santu. For Dharamraj, the decision to marry Santu is purely a business calculation for appeasing his workforce. Dharamraj is still in love with his dead wife Subhadra, who has left him with 5 children: Hiten, Kadambari a.k.a. Kaddu, Maulik, Birwa and Suraj. Once married to Santu, he ignores her and she is constantly abused by his older sister, Tarulata a.k.a. Taru. In the meantime, Kaddu and Shashank get married. After a long time, however, Dharamraj and most of his family members accept Santu as a member of the Mahiyavanshi family. Hiten and Khemi fall in love with each other and decide to get married. However their marriage is opposed by people of Dharampur as Khemi is Hiten's Maasi (Santu who is Khemi's sister and Hiten's stepmother). For Hiten and Khemi's relationship; Dharamraj and Santu decide to get divorced. But in order to save her sister's relationship, Khemi steps out of house and marries Arjan. It is revealed that Maulik is son of Tarulata and Kanji Wagehla and the son of Dharamraj died in an accident. After sometime Dharamraj finds that Arjan is his long lost son who was believed to be dead before. Khemi gets pregnant with Arjan's child. Soon Arjan reunites with family along with Khemi. Hiten and Toral also got married. Maulik started instigating Arjan against Hiten and Khemi's relationship. He makes Arjan believes that Khemi is pregnant with Hiten's child and instigates him to kill Hiten. He intoxicates Arjan and in fit of rage and anger Arjan accidentally assaults Dharamraj. Birwa, trying to save her father, accidentally kills Arjan. To save Birwa, Santu takes the blame for the murder and goes to jail.

=== After 10 years ===
After 10 years Santu returns from prison. The Mahiyavanshis don't want her. Everyone in the Mahiyavanshi house is pretending to live happily. But Santu forces her way into the house, takes charge and starts many quarrels among family members. This brings many hidden problems to light. Dharamraj has shut himself away in a room and stopped communicating with people. But Santu with her love and honesty once again wins Dharamraj's love and family gets reunited. A woman named Megha comes forward with her son, Vishal and she claims that Dharamraj is the father of this boy. To everyone's surprise, medical tests prove that Vishal is actually Dharamraj's son. However, Dharamraj denies having any relationship with Megha. Then Santu discovers that Vishal is her own son, who was born while she was in prison. Megha had stolen Vishal from the jail hospital and Santu had been told that the baby was dead. Santu and Dharamraj reunite. Vishal comes to stay with Dharamraj and Santu, but Megha kidnaps him again.

=== After 16 years ===
After 16 years, Dharamraj's grandchildren have grown up. Santu is still waiting for her son Vishal to come home. After an extensive search, Vishal is found. He seems to be a good person, but this is just a mask. Megha has poisoned his mind against the Mahiyavanshis. Shashank and his sons, who hate Dharamraj also help Vishal. Vishal wants to separate Dharamraj and Santu. Dharamraj and Hiten, on finding out the truth, chase Vishal out of the house. Santu is shocked and becomes ill. Dharamraj is forced to take Santu to Vishal's house. But Vishal is exposed. Disillusioned, Santu comes back to the Mahiyavanshi house. Then Megha reappears and uses Vishal to get back at the Mahiyavanshi family. Vishal rapes Triveni and then forces Dharamraj and Santu to leave the house. They live the house after Vishal marries Triveni, saving the latter's honor. They go and live in Mumbai, where they start a new diamond business in the disguise of Damji Bhai and Kanku Ben. They eventually return to Dharampur. Meanwhile, Vishal has changed for the better. He realizes that Megha has used him as a pawn. He apologizes to his parents. Santu and Dharamraj forgive Vishal when they see that his regret is genuine. Santu discovers that she is pregnant once again. The Mahiyavanshi family is happy together.

== Cast ==
=== Main ===
- Ronit Roy as Dharamraj Shakti Singh Mahiyavanshi a.k.a. Naanka, DM, Maalik, Damji: Shakti Singh and Indumati's son; Tarulata's younger brother; Subhadra's widower; Santu's husband; Hiten, Kadambari, Arjan, Birwa, Suraj and Vishal's father; Maulik's adoptive father and maternal uncle (2009–11)
- Aasiya Kazi as Santu Dharamraj Mahiyavanshi a.k.a. Chokri, Santuri, Kanku: Chhagan and Reva's second daughter; Madhav's second grand daughter; Khemi's younger and Mongi's elder sister; Dharamraj's second wife; Vishal's mother; Arjan, Hiten, Kadambari, Birwa and Suraj's stepmother, Maulik's adoptive stepmother and maternal aunt (2009–11)
- Mrunal Jain as Hiten Dharamraj Mahiyavanshi: Dharamraj and Subhadra's eldest son; Santu's eldest stepson; Kadambari, Arjan, Birwa and Suraj's elder brother; Vishal's stepbrother; Maulik's foster brother and cousin; Khemi's ex-lover; Toral's husband; Rishabh and Nakul's father (2009–11)
- Kunal Thakur as Arjan Dharamraj Mahiyavanshi: Dharamraj and Subhadra's second son; Santu's second stepson and brother-in-law; Hiten and Kadambari's younger and Birwa and Suraj's elder brother; Vishal's stepbrother; Maulik's foster brother and cousin; Khemi's husband; Krishna's father (Dead) (2009–10)
- Leena Jumani as Khemi Arjan Mahiyavanshi a.k.a. Khemi Behna, Nani Ben Baa: Chhagan and Reva's eldest daughter; Madhav's eldest granddaughter; Santu and Mongi's elder sister; Hiten's ex-lover; Arjan's widow; Krishna's mother (2009–10)

=== Recurring ===
- Sameer Khakhar as Saurabh: Vasudha's husband; Subhadra and Surekha's father (Dead) (2009–10)
- Tarla Joshi as Vasudha: Saurabh's wife; Subhadra and Surekha's mother (2009–11)
- Rasika Joshi as Tarulata Kanji Waghela a.k.a. Taruben, Motiben, Ben Baa, Baa Saheb: Shakti Singh and Indumati's daughter; Dharamraj's elder sister; Kanji's estranged wife; Maulik's biological mother (2009–11)
- Riddhi Nayak / Vibhuti Thakur as Toral Hiten Mahiyavanshi: Saumil's daughter; Persy's ex-lover; Hiten's wife; Rishabh and Nakul's mother (2009–10) / (2010–2011)
- Prerna Wanvari as Kadambari Shashank Mehta a.k.a. Kaddu: Dharamraj and Subhadra's elder daughter; Hiten's younger and Arjan, Birwa and Suraj's elder sister; Vishal's stepsister; Maulik's foster sister and cousin; Shashank's wife; Sandeep's ex-wife; Nandini, Parth and Danish's mother (2009–11)
- Bharat Chawda / Ajay Krishnamurti as Shashank Rasik Mehta: Rasik and Meghna's son; Kadambari's husband; Nandini, Parth and Danish's father (2009–10) / (2010–11)
- Shardul Pandit as Maulik Kanji Waghela / Maulik Dharamraj Mahiyavanshi: Kanji and Tarulata's biological son, Dharamraj and Subhadra's adoptive son and nephew; Santu's adoptive stepson and nephew; Hiten, Kadambari, Arjan, Birwa and Suraj's foster brother and cousin; Vishal's foster stepbrother and cousin (Dead) (2009–10)
- Kimberly Jain / Hritu Dudani as Birwa Dharamraj Mahiyavanshi: Dharamraj and Subhadra's younger daughter; Hiten, Kadambari and Arjan's younger and Suraj's elder sister; Vishal's stepsister; Maulik's foster sister and cousin; Sarang's ex-wife (2009–10) / (2010)
- Unknown / Yash Dasgupta as Suraj Dharamraj Mahiyavanshi: Dharamraj and Subhadra's youngest son; Santu's third stepson; Hiten, Kadambari, Arjan and Birwa's younger brother; Vishal's stepbrother; Maulik's foster brother and cousin; Juhi's husband; Vikram's father (2009–10) / (2010; 2011)
- Ruchi savarn as Juhi Suraj Mahiyavanshi: Manish's sister; Suraj's wife; Vikram's mother (2010)
- Unknown / Jatin Shah as Sarang Vanraj Gohil: Vanraj's son; Mongi's ex-lover; Birwa's ex-husband (2010) / (2010)
- Ali Merchant / Shailesh Gulabani as Vishal Dharamraj Mahiyavanshi: Dharamraj and Santu's son; Megha's adoptive son; Hiten, Kadambari, Arjan, Birwa and Suraj's younger stepbrother; Maulik's foster stepbrother and cousin; Triveni's husband (2010) / (2010–11)
- Unknown / Jiya Mustafa as Triveni Vishal Mahiyavanshi: Rishabh's ex-lover; Vishal's wife (2010) / (2010–2011)
- Monica Singh as Meghna Rasik Mehta: Rasik's wife; Shashank's mother (2009; 2011)
- Avinash Sahijwani as Rasik Mehta: Meghna's husband; Shaashank's father (2009; 2011)
- Surendra Rajan as Madhav Solanki: Reva's father; Khemi, Santu and Mongi's maternal grandfather (Dead) (2009–10)
- Akshita Rajput / Abigail Jain as Mongi Chhagan Waghela: Chhagan and Reva's youngest daughter; Madhav's youngest grand daughter; Khemi and Santu's younger sister; Sarang's ex-lover (2009–10) / (2010)
- Sarita Shivaskar as Champakali: Kedar's wife; Arjun's mother; the Mahiyavanshi family's maid (2009–11)
- Prashant Narayanan as Kanji Waghela: Tarulata's estranged husband, Maulik's biological father (2009)
- Chhavi Mittal as Subhadra Dharamraj Mahiyavanshi: Saurabh and Vasudha's elder daughter; Surekha's elder sister; Dharamraj's first wife; Hiten, Kadambari, Arjan; Birwa and Suraj's mother; Maulik's adoptive mother and maternal aunt (Dead) (2009)
- Chhavi Mittal as Anamika Desai: Subhadra's look-alike (2009)
- Firdaus Dadi as Megha Mehra: Dharamraj's ex-lover; Manish's ex-lover and ex-fiancée; Vishal's kidnapper-turned-adoptive mother (2010–11)
- Akshay Anand as Manish Sabharwal: Megha's ex-lover and ex-fiancé; Juhi's brother (2010)
- Sumeet Sachdev as Rudra: Sarang's friend (2010–11)
- Unknown / Karan Sharma as Krishna Arjan Mahiyavanshi: Arjan and Khemi's son (2010) / (2010–11)
- Vicky Batra / Mohit Raina as Rishabh Hiten Mahiyavanshi: Hiten and Toral's elder son; Nakul's elder brother; Triveni's ex-lover (2010) / (2010–11)
- Yash Choudhary as Nakul Hiten Mahiyavanshi: Hiten and Toral's younger son; Rishabh's younger brother (2010–11)
- Ashish Kapoor as Vikram Suraj Mahiyavanshi: Suraj and Juhi's son (2010–11)
- Hetal Gada / Megha Israni as Nandini Shashank Mehta: Shashank and Kadambari's daughter; Sandeep's ex-stepdaughter; Parth and Danish's elder sister (2010) / (2010)
- Micckie Dudaaney as Danish Shashank Mehta: Shashank and Kadambari's twin son; Nandini's younger and Parth's twin brother (2010–11)
- Rithvik Dhanjani as Parth Shashank Mehta: Shashank and Kadambari's twin son; Nandini's younger and Danish's twin brother (2010–11)
- Deepak sandhu as Sandeep Avinash Choudhary: Avinash's son; Kadambari's ex-husband; Nandini's ex-stepfather (2009; 2010)
- Unknown as Avinash Choudhary: Sandeep's father (2009)
- Unknown as Pinakin: Dharamraj's ex-secretary (2009)
- Sandeep Mehta / Unknown as Kulguru: Mahiyavanshi family's priest
- Dharmesh Vyas as Virat Sanghavi: Surekha's husband (2009; 2010; 2011)
- Maya Alagh as Surekha Virat Sanghavi: Saurabh and Vasudha's younger daughter; Subhadra's younger sister; Virat's wife (2009; 2010; 2011)
- Gaurav Nanda as Tehsildar (2010)
- Rajat Tokas as Lord Krishna: Incarnation of Lord Vishnu; Supreme god in Hinduism (2010)

and others

== Production ==
After the exit of director Santaram Verma later replaced by Kaushik Ghatak, the lead Ronit Roy himself directed the series for few episodes.

In June 2010, Leena Jumani playing Kheemi quit as she was unhappy with the shaping of her character.

The series was inspired from the 1974 Gujarati novel Retpankhi of Varsha Adalja. However, with the production house not having paid the due for it, Adalja filed a complaint at The Film Writers Association and got her payment of ₹ 7.5 Lakhs after two years of the series premiere in 2011.

Balaji Telefilms made a series in 2020 on Colors as Molkki with the story under the lines of the series.
