= List of Indian television actors =

List if actors who work for Indian Television Industry

This is an alphabetical list of notable male Indian television actors.

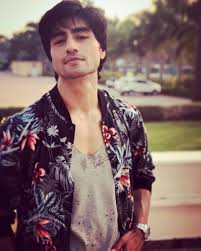
Harshad Chopda: Hindi

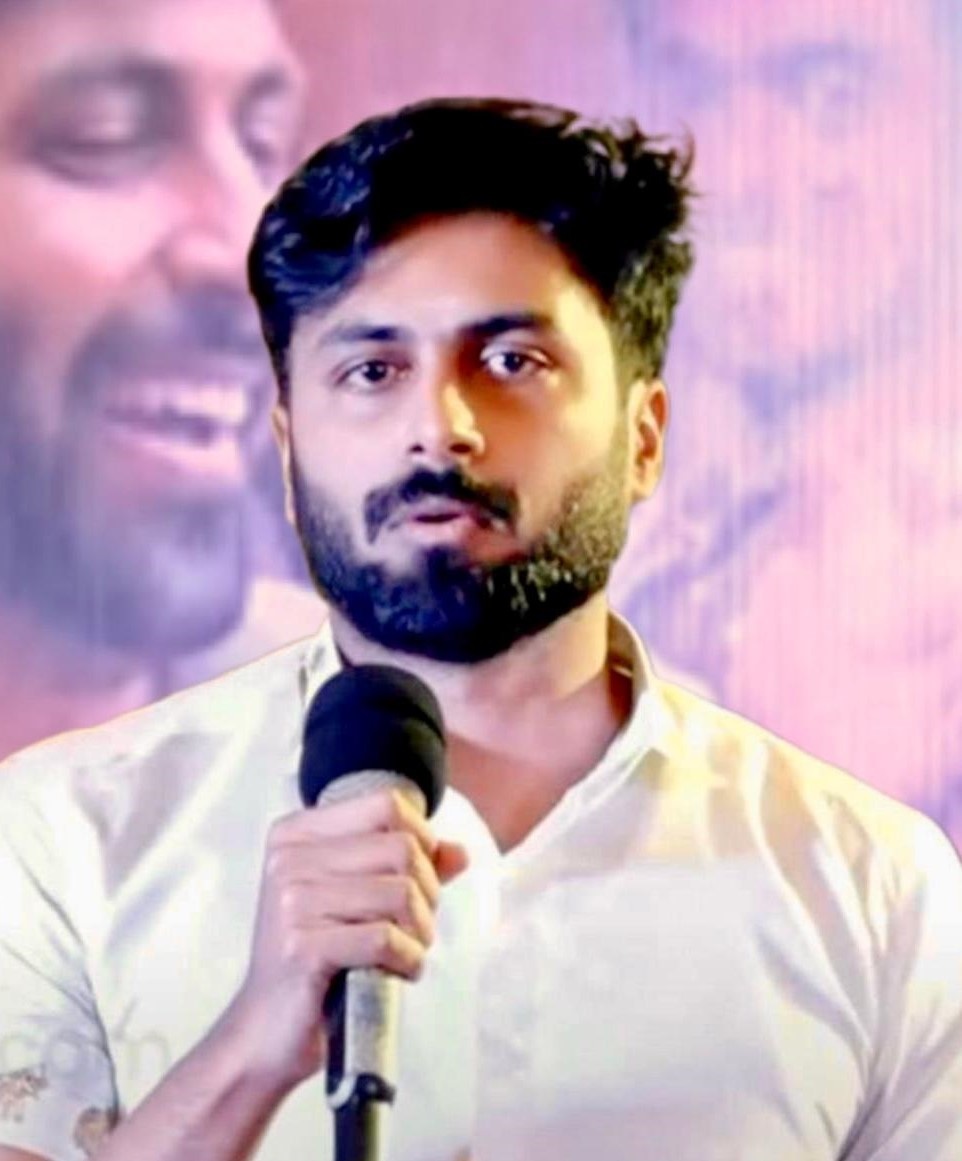
Ashwin Kumar Lakshmikanthan: Tamil

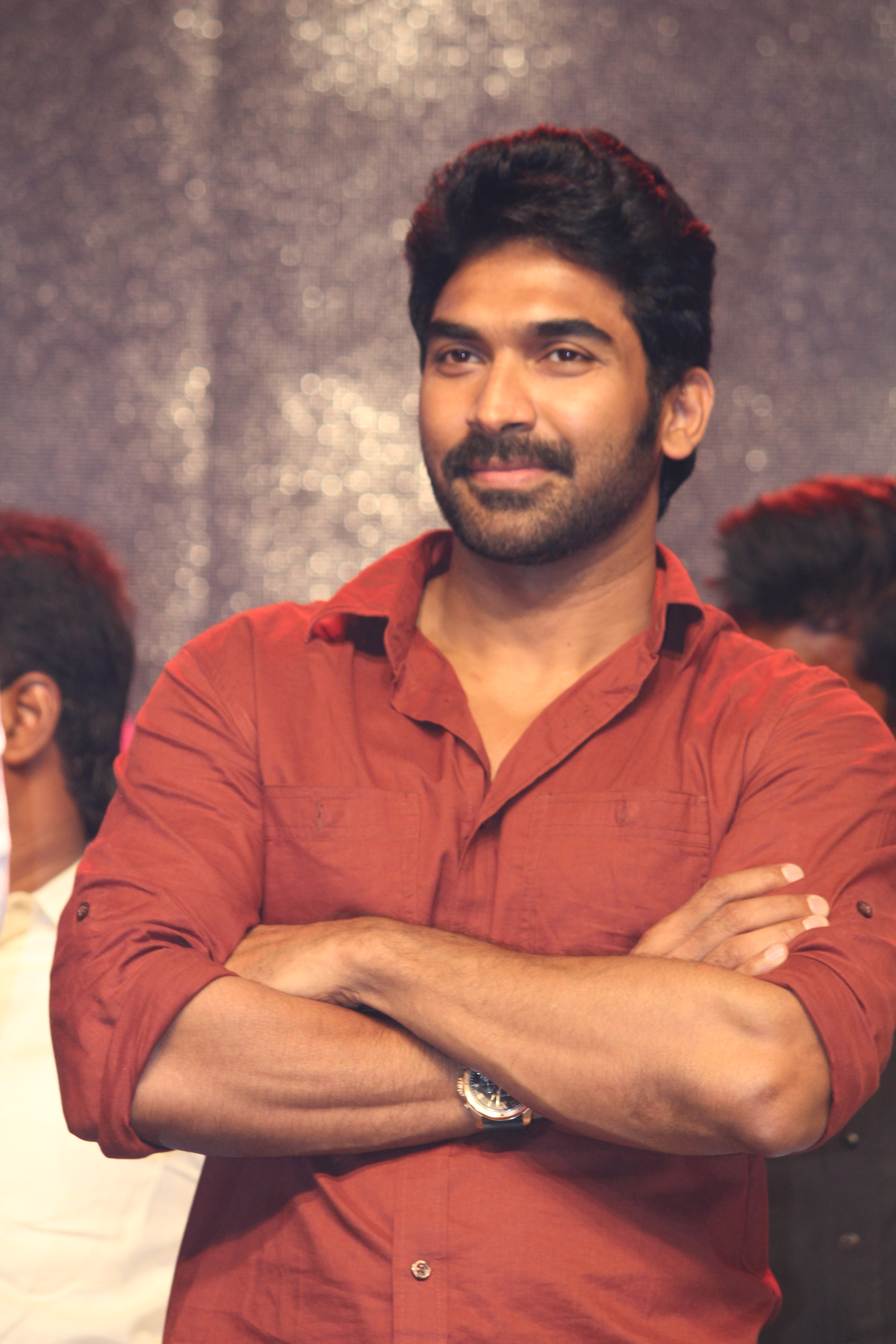
Sagar: Telugu

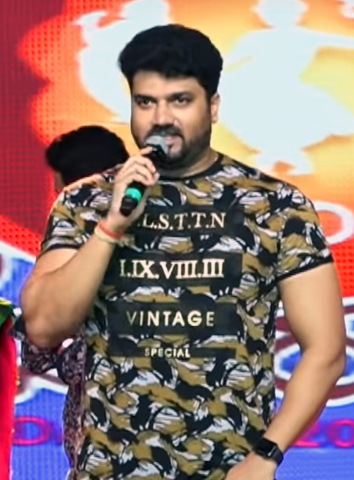
Srujan Lokesh: Kannada

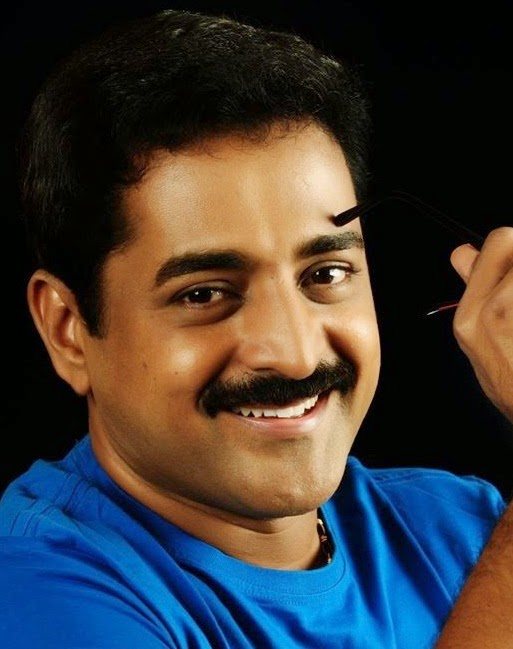
Kishor Satya: Malayalam

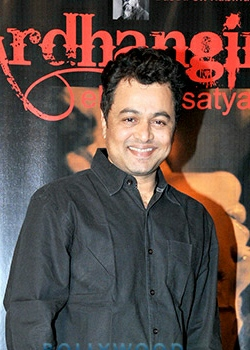
Subodh Bhave: Marathi

== See also ==
- List of Indian television actresses
- List of Indian film actors
