= Indian Telly Award for Best Actor in a Lead Role =

Indian Telly Award for Best Actor Jury

Indian Telly Award for Best Actor in a Lead Role Male
- Awarded for: Best Performance by an Actor in a Leading Role
- Country: India
- First award: 2005
- Currently held by: Kanwar Dhillon for Udne Ki Aasha as Sachin Deshmukh
- Website: Indian Telly Awards

Indian Telly Award for Best Actor in a Lead Role is an award given by the jury as a part of the annual Indian Telly Awards. It was awarded without prior nominations until 2012. Since then, the jury award has awarded with nominations like the popular award.

== Winners ==
- 2005
  Pawan Shankar for Siddhanth as Siddhanth.
- 2007
  Sharad Malhotra for Banoo Main Teri Dulhann as Sagar Pratap Singh.
- 2010
  Deven Bhojani for Baa Bahoo Aur Baby as Gopal "Gattu" Thakkar.
- 2012
  Manish Wadhwa for Chandragupta Maurya as Chanakya.
  - Jay Soni for Sasural Genda Phool as Ishaan Kashyap
  - Ram Kapoor for Bade Achhe Lagte Hain as Ram Kapoor
  - Mohnish Bahl for Kuch Toh Log Kahenge as Dr. Ashutosh
  - Narendra Jha for Havan as Hari Om Bappaji
- 2013
  Mohit Raina for Devon Ke Dev...Mahadev as Shiva.
  - Sumit Vats for Hitler Didi as Rishi Diwan
  - Dilip Joshi for Taarak Mehta Ka Ooltah Chashmah as Jethalal Gada
  - Bhavesh Balchandani for Ek Veer Ki Ardaas...Veera as Ranvijay Singh
  - Ram Kapoor for Bade Achhe Lagte Hain as Ram Kapoor
- 2014
  Anil Kapoor for 24 as Jai Singh Rathod.
  - Mohit Raina for Devon Ke Dev...Mahadev as Shiva
  - Ram Kapoor for Bade Achhe Lagte Hain as Ram Kapoor
  - Gautam Rode for Saraswatichandra as Saraswatichandra
  - Yash Tonk for Pavitra Bandhan as Girish
- 2019
  Mohit Raina for 21 Sarfarosh – Saragarhi 1897 as Havildar Ishar Singh
- 2023
  Sumeet Raghavan for Wagle Ki Duniya – Nayi Peedhi Naye Kissey as Rajesh Wagle & Pravisht Mishra for Banni Chow Home Delivery as Yuvan Singh Rathore.
  - Gaurav Khanna for Anupamaa as Anuj Kapadia
  - Nakuul Mehta for Bade Achhe Lagte Hain 2 as Ram Kapoor
  - Ankit Gupta for Udaariyaan as Fateh Singh Virk
  - Shaheer Sheikh for Kuch Rang Pyar Ke Aise Bhi as Dev Dixit
- 2025
  Kanwar Dhillon for Udne Ki Aasha as Sachin Deshmukh
  - Gaurav Khanna for Anupamaa as Anuj Kapadia
  - Sumeet Raghavan for Wagle Ki Duniya – Nayi Peedhi Naye Kissey as Rajesh Wagle
  - Arjit Taneja for Kaise Mujhe Tum Mil Gaye as Virat Singh Ahuja
  - Rohit Purohit for Yeh Rishta Kya Kehlata Hai as Armaan Poddar
