= List of accolades received by Balaji Telefilms =

Balaji Telefilms awards and nominations
Awards and nominations
Award	Wins	Nominations
BIG Star Entertainment Awards	9	24
Gold Awards	89	139
Indian Telly Awards	114	142
Indian Television Academy Awards	60	98
Star Guild Awards	17	27
Lions Gold Awards	26	41
FICCI Frames Excellence Awards	5	5
Kalakar Awards	38	52
New Talent Awards	14	30
Sansui TV Awards	20	32

Totals (Note: Certain award groups do not simply award one winner. They acknowledge several different recipients, have runners-up, and have third place. Since this is a specific recognition and is different from losing an award, runner-up mentions are considered wins in this award tally. For simplification and to avoid errors, each award in this list has been presumed to have had a prior nomination.)
- Wins: 381
- Nominations: 585

Balaji Telefilms is an Indian television producing house company. The company was founded by Ekta Kapoor and Shobha Kapoor in 1994, in Mumbai, Maharastra, India. It specializes in and Indian soap operas, fiction programming and reality television. In 2001, Balaji Telefilms expanded into film production as well as distribution.

Due to the release of fictional programming and its reception, Balaji Telefilms became a contender for major awards. In 2002, Balaji Telefilms became the first Indian television production company to earned major awards and nominations at Indian Telly Awards and Indian Television Academy Awards. Also Kyunki Saas Bhi Kabhi Bahu Thi became the first only television program to win the first ever Indian Television Academy Award for Best TV Show (Fiction) its protagonists, Smriti Irani and Amar Upadhyay became first actors to win The Television Academy Award.

== International Awards ==
Year	Award	Category	Recipient	Program	Result	Citation
2000 - 2008	Asian Television Awards	Most Watched and Awarded #1 Show of Television	Ekta Kapoor, Shobha Kapoor	Kyunki Saas Bhi Kabhi Bahu Thi	Won	
2000 - 2008	Asian Television Awards	Most Watched and Awarded #2 Show of Television	Ekta Kapoor, Shobha Kapoor	Kasautii Zindagii Kay	Won	
2000 - 2008	Asian Television Awards	Most Watched and Awarded #3 Show of Television	Ekta Kapoor, Shobha Kapoor	Kahaani Ghar Ghar Kii	Won	
2000 - 2008	Asian Television Awards	Most Watched and Awarded #4 Show of Television	Ekta Kapoor, Shobha Kapoor	Kahiin to Hoga	Won	
2010	Seoul International Drama Awards	Special Jury Award	Ekta Kapoor, Shobha Kapoor	Pavitra Rishta	Won	
2010	Seoul International Drama Awards	Best Foreign Drama Series	Ekta Kapoor, Shobha Kapoor	Pavitra Rishta	Nominated	
2010	Xplore International Talent Awards	Best Foreign Actor	Sushant Singh Rajput	Pavitra Rishta	Won	
2010	Xplore International Talent Awards	Best Foreign Actress	Ankita Lokhande	Pavitra Rishta	Won	
2010	Tokyo International Drama Awards	Best Foreign Drama	Ekta Kapoor, Shobha Kapoor	Pavitra Rishta	Won	
2013	South Africa India Film and Television Awards	Best Foreign Drama Series	Ekta Kapoor, Shobha Kapoor	Pavitra Rishta	Won	
2013	South Africa India Film and Television Awards	Best Foreign Drama Series	Ekta Kapoor, Shobha Kapoor	Bade Achhe Lagte Hain	Nominated	
2013	South Africa India Film and Television Awards	Best Foreign Actor in Drama Series	Hiten Tejwani	Pavitra Rishta	Nominated	
2013	South Africa India Film and Television Awards	Best Foreign Actor in Drama Series	Ram Kapoor	Bade Achhe Lagte Hain	Nominated	
2013	South Africa India Film and Television Awards	Best Foreign Actress in Drama Series	Ankita Lokhande	Pavitra Rishta	Nominated	
2013	South Africa India Film and Television Awards	Best Foreign Actress in Drama Series	Sakshi Tanwar	Bade Achhe Lagte Hain	Nominated	
2015	Asian Viewers Television Awards	Best Actor (Male)	Shakti Arora	Meri Aashiqui Tum Se Hi	Nominated	
2015	Asian Viewers Television Awards	Best Actor (Female)	Radhika Madan	Meri Aashiqui Tum Se Hi	Nominated	
2015	Asian Viewers Television Awards	TV Soap of the Year	Ekta Kapoor, Shobha Kapoor	Meri Aashiqui Tum Se Hi	Nominated	
2015	Asian Viewers Television Awards	Best Actor (Male)	Karan Patel	Ye Hai Mohabbatein	Nominated	
2015	Asian Viewers Television Awards	Best Actor (Female)	Divyanka Tripathi	Ye Hai Mohabbatein	Won	
2015	Asian Viewers Television Awards	TV Soap of the Year	Ekta Kapoor, Shobha Kapoor	Ye Hai Mohabbatein	Won	
2019	Asian Viewers Television Awards	Best Actor (Female)	Erica Fernandes	Kasautii Zindagii Kay 2	Won	
2019	Asian Viewers Television Awards	Best Actor (Male)	Parth Samthaan	Kasautii Zindagii Kay 2	Nominated	
2019	Asian Viewers Television Awards	TV Soap of the Year	Ekta Kapoor, Shobha Kapoor	Kasautii Zindagii Kay 2	Nominated	

== Indian Telly Awards ==
The Indian Telly Awards are annual honours presented by the media firm IndianTelevision.com. The awards are given in several categories such as best program or series in a specific genre, best television channel in a particular category, most popular actors and awards for technical roles such as writers and directors.

The last ceremony was held in 2019 where the Balaji Telefilms won 6 awards.

Year	Event	Category	Recipient	Program	Result	Citation
2001	1st	Best Production House of the Year	Ekta Kapoor, Shobha Kapoor		Won	
2002	2nd	Best Actor in Lead Role	Kiran Karmarkar	Kahaani Ghar Ghar Kii	Won	
2002	2nd	Best Actress in Lead Role	Smriti Irani	Kyunki Saas Bhi Kabhi Bahu Thi	Won	
2002	2nd	Best Actress in Negative Role	Shweta Kawatra	Kahaani Ghar Ghar Kii	Won	
2002	2nd	Best Onscreen Couple	Cezanne Khan & Shweta Tiwari	Kasautii Zindagii Kay	Won	
2002	2nd	Best Drama Series (Popular)	Ekta Kapoor, Shobha Kapoor	Kahaani Ghar Ghar Kii	Won	
2002	2nd	Best Drama Series (Popular)	Ekta Kapoor, Shobha Kapoor	Kkusum	Won	
2002	2nd	Best Drama Series (Critics)	Ekta Kapoor, Shobha Kapoor	Kasautii Zindagii Kay	Won	
2002	2nd	Best Daily Show of the Year	Ekta Kapoor, Shobha Kapoor	Kyunki Saas Bhi Kabhi Bahu Thi	Won	
2002	2nd	Best Continuing TV Show	Ekta Kapoor, Shobha Kapoor	Kyunki Saas Bhi Kabhi Bahu Thi	Won	
2002	2nd	Best Debut TV Show	Ekta Kapoor, Shobha Kapoor	Kasautii Zindagii Kay	Won	
2002	2nd	Best Debut TV Show	Ekta Kapoor, Shobha Kapoor	Kohi Apna Sa	Won	
2002	2nd	Best Dress Designer	Manohar Sawant	Kasautii Zindagii Kay	Won	
2002	2nd	Best Dialogues Writer	Rekhha Modi	Kohi Apna Sa	Won	
2002	2nd	Best Production House of the Year	Ekta Kapoor, Shobha Kapoor		Won	
2003	3rd	Best TV Music Director	Lalit Sen	Kaahin Kissii Roz	Won	
2003	3rd	Best Make-up Artist	Prohit Joker	Kasautii Zindagii Kay	Won	
2003	3rd	Best Cinematography	Santosh Suryavanshi	Kasautii Zindagii Kay	Won	
2003	3rd	Best TV Picture Editor	Dhiren Singh	Kaahin Kissii Roz	Won	
2003	3rd	Best Direction	Gautam Sobti	Kasautii Zindagii Kay	Won	
2003	3rd	Best Actress in Negative Role	Urvashi Dholakia	Kasautii Zindagii Kay	Won	
2003	3rd	Best Actor in Comic Role	Sikandar Kharbanda	Kasautii Zindagii Kay	Won	
2003	3rd	Best Onscreen Couple	Cezanne Khan & Shweta Tiwari	Kasautii Zindagii Kay	Won	
2003	3rd	Best TV Personality of the Year – Female	Smriti Irani	Kyunki Saas Bhi Kabhi Bahu Thi	Won	
2003	3rd	Best TV Personality of the Year – male	Cezanne Khan	Kasautii Zindagii Kay	Won	
2003	3rd	Best Actress in Lead Role – Jury	Shweta Tiwari	Kasautii Zindagii Kay	Won	
2003	3rd	Best Actress in Lead Role – Popular	Smriti Irani	Kyunki Saas Bhi Kabhi Bahu Thi	Won	
2003	3rd	Best Actress in Lead Role – Popular	Sakshi Tanwar	Kahaani Ghar Ghar Kii	Won	
2003	3rd	Logitech Style Icon	Ruby Bhatia	Kasautii Zindagii Kay	Won	
2003	3rd	Best Daily Show	Ekta Kapoor, Shobha Kapoor	Kyunki Saas Bhi Kabhi Bahu Thi	Won	
2003	3rd	Best Drama Series (Critics)	Ekta Kapoor, Shobha Kapoor	Kasautii Zindagii Kay	Won	
2003	3rd	Best Continuing TV Show	Ekta Kapoor, Shobha Kapoor	Kyunki Saas Bhi Kabhi Bahu Thi	Won	
2003	3rd	Best Ensemble	Ekta Kapoor, Shobha Kapoor	Kasautii Zindagii Kay	Won	
2003	3rd	Best Production House of the Year	Ekta Kapoor, Shobha Kapoor		Won	
2004	4th	Best Child Actor	Shriya Sharma	Kasautii Zindagii Kay	Won	
2004	4th	Best Actor in Supporting Role	Ronit Roy	Kasautii Zindagii Kay	Won	
2004	4th	Best Actress in Negative Role	Urvashi Dholakia	Kasautii Zindagii Kay	Won	
2004	4th	Best Actor in Negative Role	Shabbir Ahluwalia	Kahiin to Hoga	Won	
2004	4th	Best Actress in Supporting Role	Geetanjali Tikekar	Kasautii Zindagii Kay	Won	
2004	4th	Best Fresh New Face (Female)	Aamna Shariff	Kahiin to Hoga	Won	
2004	4th	Best Fresh New Face (Male)	Rajeev Khandelwal	Kahiin to Hoga	Won	
2004	4th	Best TV Personality of the Year	Rajeev Khandelwal	Kahiin to Hoga	Won	
2004	4th	Best Onscreen Couple	Rajeev Khandelwal & Aamna Shariff	Kahiin to Hoga	Won	
2004	4th	Best Actor in Lead Role	Hiten Tejwani	Kyunki Saas Bhi Kabhi Bahu Thi	Won	
2004	4th	Creative Director of the Year	Ekta Kapoor	Kasautii Zindagii Kay	Won	
2004	4th	Best Ensemble	Ekta Kapoor, Shobha Kapoor	Kahiin to Hoga	Won	
2004	4th	Best Drama Series (Critics)	Ekta Kapoor, Shobha Kapoor	Kasautii Zindagii Kay	Won	
2004	4th	Best Daily Show	Ekta Kapoor, Shobha Kapoor	Kahiin to Hoga	Won	
2004	4th	Best Continuing TV Show	Ekta Kapoor, Shobha Kapoor	Kyunki Saas Bhi Kabhi Bahu Thi	Won	
2004	4th	Best Continuing TV Show	Ekta Kapoor, Shobha Kapoor	Kasautii Zindagii Kay	Won	
2004	4th	Best Dialogues Writer	Rekkha Modi	Kasautii Zindagii Kay	Won	
2004	4th	Best Direction	Qaeed Kuwajerwala & Ravindra Gautam	Kasautii Zindagii Kay	Won	
2004	4th	Best Production House of the Year	Ekta Kapoor, Shobha Kapoor		Won	
2005	5th	Best Art Direction	Saurabh Tiwari	Kasautii Zindagii Kay	Won	
2005	5th	Best Music Composer	Lalit Sen	Kasautii Zindagii Kay	Won	
2005	5th	Best Child Artiste	Chinky Jaiswal	Kyunki Saas Bhi Kabhi Bahu Thi	Won	
2005	5th	Best Actor in Supporting Role	Hiten Tejwani	Kyunki Saas Bhi Kabhi Bahu Thi	Won	
2005	5th	Best Actress in Supporting Role – Jury	Jennifer Winget	Kasautii Zindagii Kay	Won	
2005	5th	Best Actress in Supporting Role – Popular	Gauri Pradhan	Kyunki Saas Bhi Kabhi Bahu Thi	Won	
2005	5th	Best Actor in Negative Role	Akashdeep Saigal	Kyunki Saas Bhi Kabhi Bahu Thi	Won	
2005	5th	Best Actress in Negative Role	Urvashi Dholakia	Kasautii Zindagii Kay	Won	
2005	5th	Best Fresh New Face (Male)	Iqbal Khan	Kaisa Ye Pyar Hai	Won	
2005	5th	Best TV Personality of the Year	Rajeev Khandelwal	Kahiin to Hoga	Won	
2005	5th	Best Onscreen Couple	Eijaz Khan & Anita Hassanandani	Kkavyanjali	Won	
2005	5th	Style Icon of the Year (Male)	Shabbir Ahluwalia	Kahiin to Hoga	Won	
2005	5th	Style Icon of the Year (Female)	Aamna Shariff	Kahiin to Hoga	Won	
2005	5th	Best Continuing TV Show	Ekta Kapoor, Shobha Kapoor	Kyunki Saas Bhi Kabhi Bahu Thi	Won	
2005	5th	Best Production House of the Year	Ekta Kapoor, Shobha Kapoor		Won	
2006	6th	Best Child Artiste (Male)	Dhruv Pratik	Kaisa Ye Pyar Hai	Won	
2006	6th	Best Lyrics	Nawab Arzoo	Kasautii Zindagii Kay	Won	
2006	6th	Best Costumes	Jennifer Winget	Kasautii Zindagii Kay	Won	
2006	6th	Best Actor in Supporting Role	Hiten Tejwani	Kyunki Saas Bhi Kabhi Bahu Thi	Won	
2006	6th	Best Actress in Supporting Role	Tina Parekh	Kasautii Zindagii Kay	Won	
2006	6th	Coolest Face Supporting Star	Jennifer Winget	Kasautii Zindagii Kay	Won	
2006	6th	Best Actress in Negative Role – Critics	Urvashi Dholakia	Kasautii Zindagii Kay	Won	
2006	6th	Best Actor in Negative Role – Critics	Karanvir Bohra	Kasautii Zindagii Kay	Won	
2006	6th	Best Actress in Negative Role – Popular	Ashwini Kalsekar	Kasamh Se	Won	
2006	6th	Best Actor in Lead Role – Critics	Iqbal Khan	Kaisa Ye Pyar Hai	Won	
2006	6th	Best Actress in Lead Role – Critics	Anita Hassanandani	Kkavyanjali	Won	
2006	6th	Best Actor in Lead Role – Popular	Ram Kapoor	Kasamh Se	Won	
2006	6th	Best Actress in Lead Role – Popular	Aamna Shariff	Kahiin to Hoga	Won	
2006	6th	Style Icon of the Year (Male)	Shabbir Ahluwalia	Kahiin to Hoga	Won	
2006	6th	Style Icon of the Year (Female)	Aamna Shariff	Kahiin to Hoga	Won	
2006	6th	Best Onscreen Couple	Ram Kapoor & Prachi Desai	Kasamh Se	Won	
2006	6th	Best Fresh New Face (Male)	Pulkit Samrat	Kyunki Saas Bhi Kabhi Bahu Thi	Won	
2006	6th	Best Fresh New Face (Female)	Prachi Desai	Kasamh Se	Won	
2006	6th	Best TV Personality of the Year	Ronit Roy	Kyunki Saas Bhi Kabhi Bahu Thi; Kasautii Zindagii Kay	Won	
2006	6th	Best Daily TV Show	Ekta Kapoor, Shobha Kapoor	Kasamh Se	Won	
2006	6th	Best Continuing TV Show	Ekta Kapoor, Shobha Kapoor	Kyunki Saas Bhi Kabhi Bahu Thi	Won	
2006	6th	Best Production House of the Year	Ekta Kapoor, Shobha Kapoor		Won	
2006	6th	Hall of Fame	Ekta Kapoor		Won	
2007	7th	Best Direction	Ravindra Gautam & Gautam Sobti	Kasautii Zindagii Kay	Won	
2007	7th	Best Fresh New Face (Male)	Jay Bhanushali	Kayamath	Won	
2007	7th	Best Actress in Negative Role	Urvashi Dholakia	Kasautii Zindagii Kay	Won	
2007	7th	Best Actor in Supporting Role	Hiten Tejwani	Kyunki Saas Bhi Kabhi Bahu Thi	Won	
2007	7th	Best Actor in Negative Role	Ronit Roy	Kasamh Se	Won	
2007	7th	Best Actor in Lead Role	Ram Kapoor	Kasamh Se	Won	
2007	7th	Best Actress in Lead Role	Prachi Desai	Kasamh Se	Won	
2007	7th	Best Drama Series (Critics)	Ekta Kapoor, Shobha Kapoor	Kasautii Zindagii Kay	Won	
2007	7th	Best Continuing TV Show	Ekta Kapoor, Shobha Kapoor	Kyunki Saas Bhi Kabhi Bahu Thi	Won	
2007	7th	Best Production House of the Year	Ekta Kapoor, Shobha Kapoor		Won	
2008	8th	Best Actor in Supporting Role	Jay Bhanushali	Kayamath	Won	
2008	8th	Best Actor in Negative Role	Jatin Shah	Kasturi	Won	
2008	8th	SPECIAL RECOGNISION	Ekta Kapoor, Shobha Kapoor	Kasautii Zindagii Kay	Won	
2008	8th	Best Continuing TV Show	Ekta Kapoor, Shobha Kapoor	Kasamh Se	Won	
2009	9th	Best Actress in Supporting Role	Savita Prabhune	Pavitra Rishta	Won	
2009	9th	Best Actor in Lead Role	Ronit Roy	Bandini	Won	
2009	9th	Best Ensemble	Ekta Kapoor, Shobha Kapoor	Bandini	Won	
2010	10th	Best Title Song	Kailash Kher	Tere Liye	Won	
2010	10th	Best Fresh New Face (Female)	Anupriya Kapoor	Tere Liye	Won	
2010	10th	Most Popular Actor in Lead Role	Harshad Chopda	Tere Liye	Won	
2010	10th	Most Popular Drama Series	Ekta Kapoor, Shobha Kapoor	Pavitra Rishta	Won	
2010	10th	Best Drama Series (Critics)	Ekta Kapoor, Shobha Kapoor	Tere Liye	Won	
2010	10th	Most Consistent Production House of the Decade	Ekta Kapoor, Shobha Kapoor	Balaji Telefilms	Won	
2010	10th	Most Consistent TV Vamp of the Decade	Urvashi Dholakia	Kasautii Zindagii Kay	Won	
2010	10th	Most Consistent TV Star of the Decade	Ronit Roy	Kasautii Zindagii Kay; Kyunki Saas Bhi Kabhi Bahu Thi	Won	
2012	11th	Best Story	Jayesh Patil	Bade Achhe Lagte Hain	Won	
2012	11th	Best Screenplay	Dilip Jha, Archita Biswas	Bade Achhe Lagte Hain	Won	
2012	11th	Best Actress in Lead Role (Critics)	Sakshi Tanwar	Bade Achhe Lagte Hain	Won	
2012	11th	Most Popular Actor in Lead Role	Ram Kapoor	Bade Achhe Lagte Hain	Won	
2012	11th	Most Popular Actor in Lead Role	Sameer Soni	Parichay – Nayee Zindagi Kay Sapno Ka	Won	
2012	11th	Best TV Personality of the Year (Female)	Ankita Lokhande	Pavitra Rishta	Won	
2012	11th	Best Drama Series (Critics)	Ekta Kapoor, Shobha Kapoor	Bade Achhe Lagte Hain	Won	
2013	12th	Best Child Artiste (Female)	Amrita Mukherjee	Bade Achhe Lagte Hain	Won	
2013	12th	Best Actor in Supporting Role	Rithvik Dhanjani	Pavitra Rishta	Won	
2013	12th	Best Actor in Negative Role	Mahesh Shetty	Bade Achhe Lagte Hain	Won	
2013	12th	Best Drama Series (Critics)	Ekta Kapoor, Shobha Kapoor	Kya Huaa Tera Vaada	Won	
2013	12th	Beat Youth Show (Non-Fiction)	Ekta Kapoor, Shobha Kapoor	Gumrah: End of Innocence	Won	
2014	13th	Best Child Artiste (Female)	Ruhanika Dhawan	Ye Hai Mohabbatein	Won	
2014	13th	Best Actress in Negative Role	Ashwini Kalsekar	Jodha Akbar	Won	
2014	13th	Best Fresh New Face (Female)	Paridhi Sharma	Jodha Akbar	Won	
2014	13th	Most Popular Actor in Lead Role	Rajat Tokas	Jodha Akbar	Won	
2014	13th	Most Actress Actor in Lead Role	Divyanka Tripathi	Ye Hai Mohabbatein	Won	
2014	13th	Best Onscreen Couple	Karan Patel & Divyanka Tripathi	Ye Hai Mohabbatein	Won	
2014	13th	Most Popular Historical Series	Ekta Kapoor, Shobha Kapoor	Jodha Akbar	Won	
2015	14th	Best Fresh New Face (Female)	Radhika Madan	Meri Aashiqui Tum Se Hi	Won	
2015	14th	Most Popular Actor in Lead Role	Karan Patel	Ye Hai Mohabbatein	Won	
2015	14th	Most Popular Actress in Lead Role	Sriti Jha	Kumkum Bhagya	Won	
2015	14th	Best Onscreen Couple	Karan Patel & Divyanka Tripathi	Ye Hai Mohabbatein	Won	
2015	14th	Best Onscreen Couple	Shabbir Ahluwalia & Sriti Jha	Kumkum Bhagya	Won	
2015	14th	Most Popular TV Personality of the Year	Divyanka Tripathi	Ye Hai Mohabbatein	Won	
2019	15th	Best Daily Series	Ekta Kapoor	Kumkum Bhagya	Won	
2019	15th	Best Actress in Negative Role (Popular)	Hina Khan	Kasautii Zindagii Kay	Won	
2019	15th	Best Actress in Negative Role (Jury)	Hina Khan	Kasautii Zindagii Kay	Won	
2019	15th	Best Actress in Lead Role (Jury)	Divyanka Tripathi	Ye Hai Mohabbatein	Won	
2019	15th	Best Onscreen Couple	Parth Samthaan & Erica Fernandes	Kasautii Zindagii Kay	Won	
2019	15th	Most Popular TV Personality of the Year	Divyanka Tripathi	Ye Hai Mohabbatein	Won	
2021	16th	Best Daily Series	Ekta Kapoor	Kundali Bhagya	Won	
2021	16th	Best Actor in Lead Role (Male)	Dheeraj Dhoopar	Kundali Bhagya	Won	
2021	16th	Best Actor in Lead Role (Female)	Surbhi Chandna	Naagin (season 5)	Won	
2021	16th	Best Weekly Show	Ekta Kapoor	Naagin (season 5)	Won	
2021	16th	Best Onscreen Couple	Shabir Ahluwalia & Sriti Jha	Kumkum Bhagya	Won	
2021	16th	Best Child Artist (Male)	Yagya Bhasin	Yeh Hai Chahatein	Won	
2023	17th	Best Daily Series	Ekta Kapoor	Yeh Hai Chahatein	Won	
2023	17th	Best Weekly Show	Ekta Kapoor	Naagin (season 6)	Won	
2023	17th	Best Actor in Negative Role (Female)	Mahek Chahal	Naagin (season 6)	Won	
2023	17th	Best Actor in Supporting Role (Female)	Anjum Fakih	Kundali Bhagya	Won	
2023	17th	Best Actor in Supporting Role (Male)	Ajay Nagrath	Bade Achhe Lagte Hain 2	Won	
2023	17th	Best Child Artist	Aarohi Kumavat	Bade Achhe Lagte Hain 2	Won	

== Indian Television Academy Awards ==
The Indian Television Academy Awards are annual awards presented by the Indian Television Academy. The awards are given to various artists, technicians and crew members.

Year	Event	Category	Recipient	Program	Result	Citation
2001	1st	Best Actor (Popular)	Amar Upadhyay	Kyunki Saas Bhi Kabhi Bahu Thi	Won	
2001	1st	Best Actress (Popular)	Smriti Irani	Kyunki Saas Bhi Kabhi Bahu Thi	Won	
2001	1st	Best Serial (Popular)	Ekta Kapoor, Shobha Kapoor	Kyunki Saas Bhi Kabhi Bahu Thi	Won	
2001	1st	Best Star Cast	Ekta Kapoor, Shobha Kapoor	Kyunki Saas Bhi Kabhi Bahu Thi	Won	
2002	2nd	Best Actor (Popular)	Cezzane Khan	Kasautii Zindagii Kay	Won	
2002	2nd	Best Actress (Popular)	Smriti Irani	Kyunki Saas Bhi Kabhi Bahu Thi	Won	
2002	2nd	Best Serial (Popular)	Ekta Kapoor, Shobha Kapoor	Kyunki Saas Bhi Kabhi Bahu Thi	Won	
2003	3rd	Best Audiography	Vikas Patil	Kyunki Saas Bhi Kabhi Bahu Thi	Won	
2003	3rd	Best Actor (Popular)	Ronit Roy	Kyunki Saas Bhi Kabhi Bahu Thi	Won	
2003	3rd	Best Actress (Popular)	Smriti Irani	Kyunki Saas Bhi Kabhi Bahu Thi	Won	
2003	3rd	Best Serial (Popular)	Ekta Kapoor, Shobha Kapoor	Kyunki Saas Bhi Kabhi Bahu Thi	Won	
2003	3rd	Best Thriller/ Horror Serial	Ekta Kapoor, Shobha Kapoor	Kya Hadsaa Kya Haqeeqat	Won	
2003	3rd	Scroll of Honour – Entertainment	Jeetendra	Balaji Telefilms	Won	
2003	3rd	Scroll of Honour – Entertainment	Shobha Kapoor	Balaji Telefilms	Won	
2003	3rd	Scroll of Honour – Entertainment	Ekta Kapoor	Balaji Telefilms	Won	
2004	4th	Best Art Direction	Saurabh Tiwari	Kasautii Zindagii Kay	Won	
2004	4th	Best Audiography	Suresh Saboo	Kahaani Ghar Ghar Kii	Won	
2004	4th	Best Direction	Gautam Sobti	Kasautii Zindagii Kay	Won	
2004	4th	Best Title Song	Lalit Sen	Kahaani Ghar Ghar Kii	Won	
2004	4th	Best Child Actor	Shriya Sharma	Kasautii Zindagii Kay	Won	
2004	4th	Best Actress in a Negative Role – Drama	Geetanjali Tikekar	Kasautii Zindagii Kay	Won	
2004	4th	Gr8! Newcomer (Male)	Chetan Hansraj	Kahaani Ghar Ghar Kii	Won	
2004	4th	Best Actor in a Comic Role – Drama	Sikandar Kharbanda	Kasautii Zindagii Kay	Won	
2004	4th	Best Actor (Popular)	Ronit Roy	Kyunki Saas Bhi Kabhi Bahu Thi; Kasautii Zindagii Kay	Won	
2004	4th	Best Actress (Popular)	Smriti Irani	Kyunki Saas Bhi Kabhi Bahu Thi	Won	
2004	4th	Best Serial (Jury)	Ekta Kapoor, Shobha Kapoor	Kasautii Zindagii Kay	Won	
2004	4th	Best Serial (Popular)	Ekta Kapoor, Shobha Kapoor	Kyunki Saas Bhi Kabhi Bahu Thi	Won	
2005	5th	Best Lyrics	Nawab Arzoo	Kasautii Zindagii Kay	Won	
2005	5th	Best Actor in Supporting Role	Shabbir Ahluwalia	Kahiin To Hoga	Won	
2005	5th	Best Actress in Supporting Role	Shilpa Sakhlani	Kyunki Saas Bhi Kabhi Bahu Thi	Won	
2005	5th	Best Actress in Negative Role	Urvashi Dholakia	Kasautii Zindagii Kay	Won	
2005	5th	Best Actor (Jury)	Ronit Roy	Kasautii Zindagii Kay	Won	
2005	5th	Best Actor (Popular)	Hiten Tejwani	Kyunki Saas Bhi Kabhi Bahu Thi	Won	
2005	5th	Best Actress (Popular)	Smriti Irani	Kyunki Saas Bhi Kabhi Bahu Thi	Won	
2005	5th	Best Serial (Popular)	Ekta Kapoor, Shobha Kapoor	Kyunki Saas Bhi Kabhi Bahu Thi	Won	
2006	6th	Best Teleplay	Anil Nagpal	Kyunki Saas Bhi Kabhi Bahu Thi	Won	
2006	6th	Best Title Song	Pritam Chakraborty	Kkavyanjali	Won	
2006	6th	Best Actor in Supporting Role	Ali Asgar	Kahaani Ghar Ghar Kii	Won	
2006	6th	Best Actress in Negative Role	Urvashi Dholakia	Kasautii Zindagii Kay	Won	
2006	6th	Best Actor (Jury)	Ronit Roy	Kasautii Zindagii Kay	Won	
2006	6th	Best Serial (Jury)	Ekta Kapoor, Shobha Kapoor	Kasamh Se	Won	
2006	6th	Best Actor (Popular)	Ram Kapoor	Kasamh Se	Won	
2007	7th	Best Direction	Hitesh Tejwani	Kasautii Zindagii Kay	Won	
2007	7th	Best Art Director	Saurabh Tiwari	Kasautii Zindagii Kay	Won	
2007	7th	Best Actress in Negative Role	Urvashi Dholakia	Kasautii Zindagii Kay	Won	
2007	7th	Best Actress in Negative Role	Ashwini Kalsekar	Kasamh Se	Won	
2007	7th	Best Actor (Jury)	Ronit Roy	Kasautii Zindagii Kay	Won	
2007	7th	Best Serial (Jury)	Ekta Kapoor, Shobha Kapoor	Kasautii Zindagii Kay	Won	
2008	8th	Best Actor in Supporting Role	Ali Asgar	Kahaani Ghar Ghar Kii	Won	
2009	9th	Best Actor (Jury)	Ronit Roy	Bandini	Won	
2010	10th	Gr8! Face of the Year (Male)	Harshad Chopda	Tere Liye	Won	
2010	10th	Gr8! Face of the Year (Female)	Ankita Lokhande	Pavitra Rishta	Won	
2010	10th	Best Actor (Popular)	Sushant Singh Rajput	Pavitra Rishta	Won	
2011	11th	Best Director (Jury)	Ravindra Gautam	Bade Achhe Lagte Hain	Won	
2011	11th	Best Actor (Jury)	Ram Kapoor	Bade Achhe Lagte Hain	Won	
2011	11th	Best Actress (Jury)	Sakshi Tanwar	Bade Achhe Lagte Hain	Won	
2011	11th	Best Serial (Jury)	Ekta Kapoor, Shobha Kapoor	Bade Achhe Lagte Hain	Won	
2011	11th	Gr8! Laurel For Ensemble Acting	Ekta Kapoor, Shobha Kapoor	Pavitra Rishta	Won	
2012	12th	Best Child Artiste	Amrita Mukherjee	Bade Achhe Lagte Hain	Won	
2012	12th	Best Actor (Jury)	Ram Kapoor	Bade Achhe Lagte Hain	Won	
2012	12th	Best Actor (Jury)	Sameer Soni	Parichay – Nayee Zindagi Kay Sapno Ka	Won	
2012	12th	Beat Crime/ Thriller Show	Ekta Kapoor, Shobha Kapoor	Gumrah: End of Innocence	Won	
2013	13th	Best Historical /Mythological Show	Ekta Kapoor, Shobha Kapoor	Jodha Akbar	Won	
2015	15th	Best Romantic Actor (Male)	Karan Patel	Ye Hai Mohabbatein	Won	
2015	15th	Best Fresh New Face (Female)	Radhika Madan	Meri Aashiqui Tum Se Hi	Won	
2015	15th	Youth Icon of the Year (Male)	Shakti Arora	Meri Aashiqui Tum Se Hi	Won	
2015	15th	Best Actress in Negative Role	Anita Hassanandani	Ye Hai Mohabbatein	Won	
2015	15th	Gr8! Onscreen Couple	Shabbir Ahluwalia & Sriti Jha	Kumkum Bhagya	Won	
2016	16th	Gr8! Onscreen Couple	Karan Patel & Divyanka Tripathi	Ye Hai Mohabbatein	Won	
2016	16th	Best Actor (Popular)	Shabbir Ahluwalia	Kumkum Bhagya	Won	
2016	16th	Best Actress (Popular)	Mouni Roy	Naagin (season 1)	Won	
2016	16th	Best Serial (Popular)	Ekta Kapoor, Shobha Kapoor	Naagin (season 1)	Won	
2017	17th	Sterling Icon of Indian Entertainment	Ekta Kapoor		Won	
2018	18th	Best Actress - Drama	Divyanka Tripathi	Ye Hai Mohabbatein	Won	
2018	18th	Highest Rated Show on Indian Television	Ekta Kapoor, Shobha Kapoor	Naagin (season 3)	Won	
2019	19th	Best DOP	Deepak Malwankar	Kasautii Zindagii Kay	Won	
2019	19th	Best Actress - Drama	Sriti Jha	Kumkum Bhagya	Won	
2019	19th	Best Actor - Popular	Dheeraj Dhoopar	Kundali Bhagya	Won	
2019	19th	Best Serial - Popular	Ekta Kapoor, Shobha Kapoor	Kundali Bhagya	Won	
2021	20th	Best Actress - Popular	Surbhi Chandna	Naagin (season 5)	Won	
2021	20th	ITA Landmark Show	Ekta Kapoor & Shobha Kapoor	Naagin (season 5)	Won	
2021	20th	Best Actor - Popular	Dheeraj Dhoopar	Kundali Bhagya	Won	
2021	20th	ITA Landmark Show	Ekta Kapoor & Shobha Kapoor	Kundali Bhagya	Won	
2021	20th	ITA Milestone Drama Series of Two Decades	Shweta Tiwari; Urvashi Dholakia; Cezanne Khan; Ekta Kapoor; Shobha Kapoor	Kasautii Zindagii Kay	Won	
2021	20th	ITA Hall of Fame	Ekta Kapoor	Balaji Telefilms	Won	
2021	21st	Best Actor (Popular)	Nakuul Mehta	Bade Achhe Lagte Hain 2	Won	
2021	21st	Best Teleplay	Deepika Bajpayee	Bade Achhe Lagte Hain 2	Won	
2021	21st	Best Drama series	Ekta Kapoor	Bade Achhe Lagte Hain 2	Won	
2022	22nd	Best Actor (Jury)	Nakuul Mehta	Bade Achhe Lagte Hain 2	Won	
2022	22nd	Best Actress (Jury)	Disha Parmar	Bade Achhe Lagte Hain 2	Won	
2022	22nd	Best Drama series (Jury)	Ekta Kapoor, Shobha Kapoor	Bade Achhe Lagte Hain 2	Won	
2023	23rd	Best Actor (Jury)	Nakuul Mehta	Bade Achhe Lagte Hain 3	Won	
2025	25th	Best Actor (Popular)	Harshad Chopda	Bade Achhe Lagte Hain 4	Won	
2025	25th	Best Actress (Popular)	Shivangi Joshi	Bade Achhe Lagte Hain 4	Nominated	

== Gold Awards ==
The Gold Awards are annual honors presented by Zee TV in association with White Leaf Entertainment. The awards are awarded in several categories to the best performers on Indian television, which includes cast and technical crew.

The last ceremony was held in 2019 where the Balaji Telefilms won a whopping 14 awards including Gold Award for Best Television Show (Fiction) for Kundali Bhagya.

Year	Event	Category	Recipient	Program	Result	Citation
2007	1st	Best Actress in Negative Role	Urvashi Dholakia	Kasautii Zindagii Kay	Won	
2007	1st	Best Serial	Ekta Kapoor	Kasautii Zindagii Kay	Won	
2008	2nd	Best Child Artiste	Ahsaas Khanna	Kasamh Se	Won	
2008	2nd	Best Actor in Negative Role	Chetan Hansraj	Kahaani Ghar Ghar Kii	Won	
2008	2nd	Best Actress in Negative Role	Sanjeeda Shaikh	Kayamath	Won	
2008	2nd	Best Actor in Lead Role (Critics)	Ram Kapoor	Kasamh Se	Won	
2008	2nd	Best Actor in Lead Role (Popular)	Shabbir Ahluwalia	Kayamath	Won	
2010	3rd	Best Actor in Negative Role (Critics)	Sharad Kelkar	Bairi Piya	Won	
2010	3rd	Best Actress in Supporting Role (Critics)	Savita Prabhune	Pavitra Rishta	Won	
2010	3rd	Best Actor in Lead Role (Critics)	Ronit Roy	Bandini	Won	
2010	3rd	Gold Debut in Lead Role	Ankita Lokhande	Pavitra Rishta	Won	
2010	3rd	Best Actor in Lead Role (Popular)	Sushant Singh Rajput	Pavitra Rishta	Won	
2010	3rd	Most Consistent TRP Gainer Show of the Year	Ekta Kapoor, Shobha Kapoor	Pavitra Rishta	Won	
2010	3rd	Hall of Fame	Ekta Kapoor		Won	
2011	4th	Best Director (Fiction)	Partho Mitra	Pyaar Kii Ye Ek Kahaani	Won	
2011	4th	Best Actress in Supporting Role (Critics)	Savita Prabhune	Pavitra Rishta	Won	
2011	4th	Best Actress in Negative Role (Popular)	Usha Nadkarni	Pavitra Rishta	Won	
2011	4th	Best Actor in Lead Role (Popular)	Sushant Singh Rajput	Pavitra Rishta	Won	
2011	4th	Best Actress in Lead Role (Popular)	Ankita Lokhande	Pavitra Rishta	Won	
2011	4th	Best Television Show (Fiction)	Ekta Kapoor, Shobha Kapoor	Pavitra Rishta	Won	
2011	4th	Highest Voted Actress	Reshmi Ghosh	Tere Liye	Won	
2011	4th	Most Consistent TRP Gainer Show of the Year	Ekta Kapoor, Shobha Kapoor	Tere Liye	Won	
2012	5th	Best Actress in Negative Role (Critics)	Usha Nadkarni	Pavitra Rishta	Won	
2012	5th	Best Actor in Lead Role (Critics)	Sameer Soni	Parichay – Nayee Zindagi Kay Sapno Ka	Won	
2012	5th	Best Actress in Lead Role (Critics)	Sakshi Tanwar	Bade Achhe Lagte Hain	Won	
2012	5th	Best Actor in Lead Role (Popular)	Ram Kapoor	Bade Achhe Lagte Hain	Won	
2012	5th	Best Actress in Lead Role (Popular)	Ankita Lokhande	Pavitra Rishta	Won	
2012	5th	Stellar Performer of the Year	Asha Negi	Pavitra Rishta	Won	
2013	6th	Best Actress in Comic Role (Critics)	Usha Nadkarni	Pavitra Rishta	Won	
2013	6th	Best Actress in Lead Role (Critics)	Sakshi Tanwar	Bade Achhe Lagte Hain	Won	
2013	6th	Best Actor in Negative Role (Popular)	Mahesh Shetty	Bade Achhe Lagte Hain	Won	
2013	6th	Gold Producer's Honour for Completing 1000 Episodes	Ekta Kapoor, Shobha Kapoor	Pavitra Rishta	Won	
2014	7th	Best Director (Fiction)	Santram Verma	Jodha Akbar	Won	
2014	7th	Best Actress in Supporting Role (Critics)	Lavina Tandon	Jodha Akbar	Won	
2014	7th	Best Actor in Negative Role (Critics)	Chetan Hansraj	Jodha Akbar	Won	
2014	7th	Best Actress in Negative Role (Critics)	Ashwini Kalsekar	Jodha Akbar	Won	
2014	7th	Best Actor in Lead Role (Critics)	Rajat Tokas	Jodha Akbar	Won	
2014	7th	Boroplus Face of the Year	Divyanka Tripathi	Ye Hai Mohabbatein	Won	
2014	7th	Best Actress in Negative Role (Popular)	Anita Hassanandani	Ye Hai Mohabbatein	Won	
2014	7th	Gold Debut in Lead Role (Female)	Paridhi Sharma	Jodha Akbar	Won	
2014	7th	Best Actor in Lead Role (Popular)	Karan Patel	Ye Hai Mohabbatein	Won	
2014	7th	Best Television Show (Fiction)	Ekta Kapoor, Shobha Kapoor	Jodha Akbar	Won	
2015	8th	Best Actor in Negative Role (Critics)	Sangram Singh	Ye Hai Mohabbatein	Won	
2015	8th	Best Actress in Negative Role (Critics)	Shikha Singh	Kumkum Bhagya	Won	
2015	8th	Boroplus Face of the Year	Divyanka Tripathi	Ye Hai Mohabbatein	Won	
2015	8th	Best Actor in Lead Role (Critics)	Shabbir Ahluwalia	Kumkum Bhagya	Won	
2015	8th	Best Actress in Negative Role (Popular)	Anita Hassanandani	Ye Hai Mohabbatein	Won	
2015	8th	Best Actor in Supporting Role (Popular)	Raj Singh Arora	Ye Hai Mohabbatein	Won	
2015	8th	Gold Debut in Lead Role (Female)	Radhika Madan	Meri Aashiqui Tum Se Hi	Won	
2015	8th	Best Actor in Lead Role (Popular)	Karan Patel	Ye Hai Mohabbatein	Won	
2015	8th	Best Actress in Lead Role (Popular)	Divyanka Tripathi	Ye Hai Mohabbatein	Won	
2015	8th	Best Television Show (Fiction)	Ekta Kapoor, Shobha Kapoor	Ye Hai Mohabbatein	Won	
2016	9th	Best Actress in Negative Role (Critics)	Adaa Khan	Naagin (season 1)	Won	
2016	9th	Boroplus Face of the Year	Divyanka Tripathi	Ye Hai Mohabbatein	Won	
2016	9th	Boroplus Face of the Year	Sriti Jha	Kumkum Bhagya	Won	
2016	9th	Best Actor in Lead Role (Critics)	Arjun Bijlani	Naagin (season 1)	Won	
2016	9th	Best Actor in Negative Role (Popular)	Sangram Singh	Ye Hai Mohabbatein	Won	
2016	9th	Best Actress in Negative Role (Popular)	Anita Hassanandani	Ye Hai Mohabbatein	Won	
2016	9th	Best Actor in Supporting Role (Popular)	Raj Singh Arora	Ye Hai Mohabbatein	Won	
2016	9th	Best Television Show Based on Crime/ Thriller/ Horror/ VFX	Ekta Kapoor, Shobha Kapoor	Naagin (season 1)	Won	
2016	9th	Best Actor in Lead Role (Popular)	Karan Patel	Ye Hai Mohabbatein	Won	
2016	9th	Best Actor in Lead Role (Popular)	Shabbir Ahluwalia	Kumkum Bhagya	Won	
2016	9th	Best Actress in Lead Role (Popular)	Divyanka Tripathi	Ye Hai Mohabbatein	Won	
2016	9th	Best Actress in Lead Role (Popular)	Mouni Roy	Naagin (season 1)	Won	
2016	9th	Best Television Show (Fiction)	Ekta Kapoor, Shobha Kapoor	Kumkum Bhagya	Won	
2016	9th	Refreshing Jodi on Television	Sharad Malhotra & Kratika Sengar	Kasam Tere Pyaar Ki	Won	
2017	10th	Best Actress in Negative Role (Critics)	Adaa Khan	Naagin (season 2)	Won	
2017	10th	Boroplus Face of the Year	Mouni Roy	Naagin (season 2)	Won	
2017	10th	Best Actor in Lead Role (Critics)	Karanvir Bohra	Naagin (season 2)	Won	
2017	10th	Best Actress in Lead Role (Critics)	Mouni Roy	Naagin (season 2)	Won	
2017	10th	Powerpacked Performer of the Year	Sharad Malhotra	Kasam Tere Pyaar Ki	Won	
2017	10th	Best Actress in Negative Role (Popular)	Anita Hassanandani	Ye Hai Mohabbatein	Won	
2017	10th	Best Television Show Based on Crime/ Thriller/ Horror/ VFX	Ekta Kapoor, Shobha Kapoor	Naagin (season 2)	Won	
2017	10th	Best Actor in Lead Role (Popular)	Karan Patel	Ye Hai Mohabbatein	Won	
2017	10th	Best Actress in Lead Role (Popular)	Divyanka Tripathi	Ye Hai Mohabbatein	Won	
2017	10th	Best Television Show (Fiction)	Ekta Kapoor, Shobha Kapoor	Kumkum Bhagya	Won	
2018	11th	Most Fit Actor (Female)	Surbhi Jyoti	Naagin (season 3)	Won	
2018	11th	Most Fit Actor (Female)	Karishma Tanna	Naagin (season 3)	Won	
2018	11th	Most Fit Actor (Male)	Vivek Dahiya	Qayamat Ki Raat	Won	
2018	11th	Kesh-King Healthy Hair	Divyanka Tripathi	Ye Hai Mohabbatein	Won	
2018	11th	Most Celebrated Actor on Television	Karan Patel	Ye Hai Mohabbatein	Won	
2018	11th	Most Celebrated Actress on Television	Divyanka Tripathi	Ye Hai Mohabbatein	Won	
2018	11th	Best Actor in Negative Role (Popular)	Sanjay Gagnani	Kundali Bhagya	Won	
2018	11th	Best Actress in Supporting Role (Popular)	Anjum Fakih	Kundali Bhagya	Won	
2018	11th	Best Actress in Negative Role (Popular)	Shikha Singh	Kumkum Bhagya	Won	
2018	11th	Best Actor in Lead Role (Popular)	Shabbir Ahluwalia	Kumkum Bhagya	Won	
2018	11th	Best Actress in Lead Role (Popular)	Sriti Jha	Kumkum Bhagya	Won	
2018	11th	Best Actress in Lead Role (Popular)	Shraddha Arya	Kundali Bhagya	Won	
2018	11th	Best Television Show (Fiction)	Ekta Kapoor, Shobha Kapoor	Kumkum Bhagya	Won	
2018	11th	Gold Producer's Honour for Completing 1000 Episodes	Ekta Kapoor, Shobha Kapoor	Kumkum Bhagya	Won	
2018	11th	Gold Producer's Honour for Completing 1000 Episodes	Ekta Kapoor, Shobha Kapoor	Ye Hai Mohabbatein	Won	
2019	12th	Most Fit Actor (Female)	Hina Khan	Kasautii Zindagii Kay	Won	
2019	12th	Most Stylish Diva	Erica Fernandes	Kasautii Zindagii Kay	Won	
2019	12th	TV Personality of the Year	Divyanka Tripathi	Ye Hai Mohabbatein	Won	
2019	12th	TV Personality of the Year	Hina Khan	Kasautii Zindagii Kay	Won	
2019	12th	Best Actress in Supporting Role (Critics)	Mugdha Chaphekar	Kumkum Bhagya	Won	
2019	12th	Best Actress in Supporting Role (Popular)	Anita Hassanandani	Naagin (season 3)	Won	
2019	12th	Best Actor in Negative Role (Critics)	Sanjay Gagnani	Kundali Bhagya	Won	
2019	12th	Best Actress in Negative Role (Popular)	Hina Khan	Kasautii Zindagii Kay	Won	
2019	12th	Best Actor in Negative Role (Popular)	Karan Singh Grover	Kasautii Zindagii Kay	Won	
2019	12th	Best Actress in Lead Role (Critics)	Erica Fernandes	Kasautii Zindagii Kay	Won	
2019	12th	Best Actor in Lead Role (Critics)	Pearl V Puri	Naagin (season 3)	Won	
2019	12th	Best Actor in Lead Role (Popular)	Dheeraj Dhoopar	Kundali Bhagya	Won	
2019	12th	Best Actress in Lead Role (Popular)	Shraddha Arya	Kundali Bhagya	Won	
2019	12th	Best Television Show (Fiction)	Ekta Kapoor, Shobha Kapoor	Kundali Bhagya	Won	

== Gold Glam and Style Awards ==
The Gold Glam and Style Awards are annual honors presented by Gold Awards in association with White Leaf Entertainment. The awards are awarded in several categories to the stylish and glamorous actors on Indian television.

The last ceremony was held in 2020 where the Balaji Telefilms won six awards.

Year	Event	Category	Recipient	Program	Result	Citation
2020	1st	Most Glamorous TV Star (Male)	Dheeraj Dhoopar	Kundali Bhagya	Won	
2020	1st	Most Glamorous TV Star (Female)	Shraddha Arya	Kundali Bhagya	Won	
2020	1st	Most Photogenic Star (Female)	Mugdha Chapekar	Kumkum Bhagya	Won	
2020	1st	Most Fit Star (Female)	Pooja Banerjee	Kumkum Bhagya	Won	
2020	1st	Hot Stepper of the Year (Female)	Surbhi Chandna	Naagin (season 5)	Won	
2020	1st	Best Dressed Actor (Male)	Sharad Malhotra	Naagin (season 5)	Won	

== FICCI Frames Excellence Awards ==
The FICCI Frames Excellence Awards are annual honours presented by the Federation of Indian Chambers of Commerce & Industry. The awards are awarded to the best films, TV shows and performers in the Indian Hindi Film and Television Industry during the year.

The last ceremony was held in 2012 where Balaji Telefilms won four awards including Best Television Show (Fiction) for Bade Achhe Lagte Hain.

Year	Event	Category	Recipient	Program	Result	Citation
2011	2nd	Best Actor (Male)	Sushant Singh Rajput	Pavitra Rishta	Won	
2011	2nd	Best TV Show (Fiction)	Ekta Kapoor, Shobha Kapoor	Pavitra Rishta	Won	
2012	3rd	Best Actor (Female)	Sakshi Tanwar	Bade Achhe Lagte Hain	Won	
2012	3rd	Best Actor (Male)	Ram Kapoor	Bade Achhe Lagte Hain	Won	
2012	3rd	Best TV Show (Fiction)	Ekta Kapoor, Shobha Kapoor	Bade Achhe Lagte Hain	Won	
2012	3rd	Best Film & TV Production House of the Year	Ekta Kapoor, Shobha Kapoor	Balaji Telefilms Limited	Won	
2013	4th	Best Actor (Female)	Sakshi Tanwar	Bade Achhe Lagte Hain	Won	
2013	4th	Best Actor (Male)	Ram Kapoor	Bade Achhe Lagte Hain	Won	
2013	4th	Best TV Show (Fiction)	Ekta Kapoor, Shobha Kapoor	Bade Achhe Lagte Hain	Won	
2014	5th	Best Actor (Female)	Paridhi Sharma	Jodha Akbar	Won	
2014	5th	Best Actor (Male)	Rajat Tokas	Jodha Akbar	Won	
2014	5th	Best TV Show (Fiction)	Ekta Kapoor, Shobha Kapoor	Jodha Akbar	Won	
2015	6th	Best Actor (Female)	Divyanka Tripathi	Yeh Hai Mohabbatein	Won	
2015	6th	Best Actor (Male)	Karan Patel	Yeh Hai Mohabbatein	Won	
2015	6th	Best TV Show (Fiction)	Ekta Kapoor, Shobha Kapoor	Yeh Hai Mohabbatein	Won	
2016	7th	Best Actor (Female)	Mouni Roy	Naagin	Won	
2016	7th	Best Actor (Male)	Arjun Bijlani	Naagin	Won	
2016	7th	Best TV Show (Fiction)	Ekta Kapoor, Shobha Kapoor	Naagin	Won	
2017	8th	Best Actor (Female)	Sriti Jha	Kumkum Bhagya	Won	
2017	8th	Best Actor (Male)	Shabir Ahluwalia	Kumkum Bhagya	Won	
2017	8th	Best TV Show (Fiction)	Ekta Kapoor, Shobha Kapoor	Kumkum Bhagya	Won	
2018	9th	Best Actor (Female)	Shraddha Arya	Kundali Bhagya	Won	
2018	9th	Best Actor (Male)	Dheeraj Dhoopar	Kundali Bhagya	Won	
2018	9th	Best TV Show (Fiction)	Ekta Kapoor, Shobha Kapoor	Kundali Bhagya	Won	
2019	10th	Best Actor (Female)	Surbhi Jyoti	Naagin 3	Won	
2019	10th	Best Actor (Male)	Pearl V Puri	Naagin 3	Won	
2019	10th	Best TV Show (Fiction)	Ekta Kapoor, Shobha Kapoor	Naagin 3	Won	
2020	11th	Best Actor (Female)	Sriti Jha	Kumkum Bhagya	Won	
2020	11th	Best Onscreen Couple	Shraddha Arya & Dheeraj Dhoopar	Kundali Bhagya	Won	
2020	11th	Best TV Show (Fiction)	Ekta Kapoor, Shobha Kapoor	Kundali Bhagya	Won	
2021	12th	Best Actor (Female)	Surbhi Chandna	Naagin 5	Won	
2021	12th	Best Actor (Male)	Sharad Malhotra	Naagin 5	Won	
2021	12th	Best TV Show (Fiction)	Ekta Kapoor, Shobha Kapoor	Naagin 5	Won	
2022	13th	Best Actor (Female)	Tejasswi Prakash	Naagin 6	Won	
2022	13th	Best Actress (Negative Role)	Mahek Chahal	Naagin 6	Won	
2022	13th	Best Actor (Male)	Nakuul Mehta	Bade Achhe Lagte Hain 2	Won	
2022	13th	Best TV Show (Fiction)	Ekta Kapoor, Shobha Kapoor	Bade Achhe Lagte Hain 2	Won	

== Star Guild Awards ==
The Star Guild Awards (formerly Apsara Film and Television Producers Guild Awards) are annual honours presented by the Indian Film and Television Producers Guild of India. The awards are awarded to the best performers in the previous preceding year to actors, technicians, programs and channels.

The last ceremony was held in 2015 where Balaji Telefilms won three awards including Best Drama Series for Kumkum Bhagya.

Year	Event	Category	Recipient	Program	Result	Citation
2003	1st	Best TV Production House of the Year	Ekta Kapoor, Shobha Kapoor	Balaji Telefilms	Won	
2005	2nd	Best TV Production House of the Year	Ekta Kapoor, Shobha Kapoor	Balaji Telefilms	Won	
2011	6th	Best Actress in Drama Series	Ankita Lokhande	Pavitra Rishta	Won	
2012	7th	Best Director	Sangeita Rao	Bade Achhe Lagte Hain	Won	
2012	7th	Best Actress in Drama Series	Sakshi Tanwar	Bade Achhe Lagte Hain	Won	
2012	7th	Best Drama Series (Fiction)	Ekta Kapoor, Shobha Kapoor	Bade Achhe Lagte Hain	Won	
2013	8th	Best Story	Sonali Jaffar	Bade Achhe Lagte Hain	Won	
2013	8th	Best Screenplay	Harneet Singh	Bade Achhe Lagte Hain	Won	
2013	8th	Best Actress in Drama Series	Sakshi Tanwar	Bade Achhe Lagte Hain	Won	
2013	8th	Best Actor in Drama Series	Ram Kapoor	Bade Achhe Lagte Hain	Won	
2013	8th	Best Ongoing Drama Series	Ekta Kapoor, Shobha Kapoor	Bade Achhe Lagte Hain	Won	
2014	9th	Best Director (Drama Series)	Santram Verma	Jodha Akbar	Won	
2014	9th	Best Actor in Drama Series	Rajat Tokas	Jodha Akbar	Won	
2014	9th	Best Actress in Drama Series	Ankita Lokhande	Pavitra Rishta	Won	
2015	10th	Best Actor in Drama Series	Ronit Roy	Itna Karo Na Mujhe Pyaar	Won	
2015	10th	Best Ongoing Drama Series	Ekta Kapoor, Shobha Kapoor	Jodha Akbar	Won	
2015	10th	Best Drama Series (Fiction)	Ekta Kapoor, Shobha Kapoor	Kumkum Bhagya	Won	

== Big Star Entertainment Awards ==
The BIG Star Entertainment Awards (recently BIG ZEE Entertainment Awards) are annual honours presented by Reliance Entertainment. The awards are given to the best performers in television, films, music and sports.

The last ceremony was held in 2017 where Balaji Telefilms won 2 awards out of 7 nominations including BIG ZEE Most Entertaining TV Show for Naagin (season 2).

Year	Event	Category	Recipient	Program	Result	Citation
2010	1st	BIG Star Most Entertaining TV Actor	Sushant Singh Rajput	Pavitra Rishta	Won	
2010	1st	BIG Star Most Entertaining TV Show of the Decade	Ekta Kapoor, Shobha Kapoor	Kyunki Saas Bhi Kabhi Bahu Thi	Won	
2010	1st	BIG Star Most Entertaining TV Personality of the Decade	Ekta Kapoor		Won	
2011	2nd	BIG Star Most Entertaining TV Actress	Sakshi Tanwar	Bade Achhe Lagte Hain	Won	
2014	5th	BIG Star Most Entertaining TV Actress	Divyanka Tripathi	Ye Hai Mohabbatein	Won	
2015	6th	BIG Star Most Entertaining TV Show (Fiction)	Ekta Kapoor, Shobha Kapoor	Ye Hai Mohabbatein	Won	
2015	6th	BIG Star Most Entertaining TV Show (Fiction)	Ekta Kapoor, Shobha Kapoor	Kumkum Bhagya	Won	
2017	7th	BIG ZEE Most Entertaining TV Actress	Mouni Roy	Naagin (season 2)	Won	
2017	7th	BIG ZEE Most Entertaining TV Show (Fiction)	Ekta Kapoor, Shobha Kapoor	Naagin (season 2)	Won	

== Lions Gold Awards ==
The Lions Gold Awards are annual honours presented by the Lions Clubs Mumbai to the best performers in television and films.

Year	Event	Category	Recipient	Program	Result	Citation
2011	17th	Favorite TV Actress in Negative Role	Swati Anand	Pavitra Rishta	Won	
2011	17th	Favorite TV Actress	Ankita Lokhande	Pavitra Rishta	Won	
2011	17th	Favorite TV Actor	Sushant Singh Rajput	Pavitra Rishta	Won	
2012	18th	Favorite TV Actor in Negative Role	Mahesh Shetty	Bade Achhe Lagte Hain	Won	
2012	18th	Favorite TV Actress	Sakshi Tanwar	Bade Achhe Lagte Hain	Won	
2012	18th	Favorite TV Actor	Ram Kapoor	Bade Achhe Lagte Hain	Won	
2013	19th	Favorite TV Child Actor	Amrita Mukherjee	Bade Achhe Lagte Hain	Won	
2013	19th	Favorite TV Actress in Supporting Role	Renuka Israni	Bade Achhe Lagte Hain	Won	
2013	19th	Favorite TV Actor in Supporting Role	Sameer Kochhar	Bade Achhe Lagte Hain	Won	
2013	19th	Favorite TV Actress	Sakshi Tanwar	Bade Achhe Lagte Hain	Won	
2013	19th	Favorite TV Actor	Ram Kapoor	Bade Achhe Lagte Hain	Won	
2013	19th	Favorite TV Show (Fiction)	Ekta Kapoor, Shobha Kapoor	Bade Achhe Lagte Hain	Won	
2013	19th	Favorite TV & Film Production House	Ekta Kapoor, Shobha Kapoor	Balaji Telefilms	Won	
2015	21st	Best TV Direction	Sameer Kulkarni	Kumkum Bhagya	Won	
2015	21st	Best Supporting Actress	Mrunal Thakur	Kumkum Bhagya	Won	
2015	21st	Best TV Jodi	Shabbir Ahluwalia and Sriti Jha	Kumkum Bhagya	Won	
2015	21st	Best TV Comeback	Pallavi Kulkarni	Itna Karo Na Mujhe Pyaar	Won	
2015	21st	Best TV Actress	Divyanka Tripathi	Ye Hai Mohabbatein	Won	
2015	21st	Best TV Show (Fiction)	Ekta Kapoor, Shobha Kapoor	Ye Hai Mohabbatein	Won	
2016	22nd	Best Child Actor	Ruhanika Dhawan	Ye Hai Mohabbatein	Won	
2016	22nd	Best Actress (Critics)	Mona Singh	Pyaar Ko Ho Jaane Do	Won	
2016	22nd	Best Actor (Critics)	Iqbal Khan	Pyaar Ko Ho Jaane Do	Won	
2016	22nd	Best Anchor	Rithvik Dhanjani	Nach Baliye 7	Won	
2016	22nd	Best Actress in Negative Role	Adaa Khan	Naagin (season 1)	Won	
2016	22nd	Best Television Show (Fiction)	Ekta Kapoor, Shobha Kapoor	Naagin (season 1)	Won	
2017	23rd	Favorite Child Artiste	Ruhanika Dhawan	Ye Hai Mohabbatein	Won	
2020	26th	Favorite Actress in Negative Role	Hina Khan	Kasautii Zindagii Kay 2	Won	
2020	26th	Favorite Actress in Lead Role	Shraddha Arya	Kundali Bhagya	Won	
2020	26th	TV Icon of the Year (Male)	Dheeraj Dhoopar	Kundali Bhagya	Won	
2020	26th	Favorite TV Show of the Year	Ekta Kapoor	Kundali Bhagya	Won	
2024	27th	Best Actor (Critics)	Kushal Tandon	Barsatein – Mausam Pyaar Ka	Won	
2024	27th	Best Actress (Critics)	Shivangi Joshi	Barsatein – Mausam Pyaar Ka	Won	
2024	27th	Favorite TV Show of the Year	Ekta Kapoor	Barsatein – Mausam Pyaar Ka	Won	
2025	31st	Best Actor in a Lead Role (TV-Male)	Harshad Chopda	Bade Achhe Lagte Hain 4	Won	
2025	31st	Best Actor in a Lead Role (TV-Female)	Shivangi Joshi	Bade Achhe Lagte Hain 4	Won	
2025	31st	Best Actor in a Powerful Character	Pyumori Mehta Ghosh	Bade Achhe Lagte Hain 4	Won	
2025	31st	Best Actor in a Negative Role	Rishika Nag	Bade Achhe Lagte Hain 4	Won	

== New Talent Awards ==
The New Talent Awards are annual honours presented by Tellychakkar.com to the debutants in Indian television and films in the preceding year.

The last ceremony was held in 2011 where Balaji Telefilms won two awards including Most Promising New Show of the Year (Fiction) for Tere Liye.

Year	Event	Category	Recipient	Program	Result	Citation
2008	1st	Best New Actor in Negative Role (Male)	Jatin Shah	Kasturi	Won	
2008	1st	Best New Actor in Lead Role (Male)	Karan Hukku	Kahe Na Kahe	Won	
2008	1st	Best New Onscreen Jodi	Harshad Chopda & Additi Gupta	Kis Desh Mein Hai Meraa Dil	Won	
2008	1st	Best New Television Personality	Jay Bhanushali	Kayamath	Won	
2008	1st	Most Promising New Talent of Tomorrow (Female)	Shubhangi Atre	Kasturi	Won	
2009	2nd	Best New Actor in Negative Role (Female)	Rasika Joshi	Bandini	Won	
2009	2nd	Best New Actor in Negative Role (Male)	Jai Kalra	Kis Desh Mein Hai Meraa Dil	Won	
2009	2nd	TV Icon of the Year (Male)	Karan Kundra	Kitani Mohabbat Hai	Won	
2009	2nd	Best New Onscreen Jodi	Karan Kundra & Kritika Kamra	Kitani Mohabbat Hai	Won	
2010	3rd	Best New Actor in Lead Role (Female)	Ankita Lokhande	Pavitra Rishta	Won	
2010	3rd	Best New Television Personality	Ankita Lokhande	Pavitra Rishta	Won	
2010	3rd	Most Promising New Show of the Year (Fiction)	Ekta Kapoor, Shobha Kapoor	Pavitra Rishta	Won	
2011	4th	Best New Actor in Supporting Role (Female)	Vahbbiz Dorabjee	Pyaar Kii Ye Ek Kahaani	Won	
2011	4th	Most Promising New Show of the Year (Fiction)	Ekta Kapoor, Shobha Kapoor	Tere Liye	Won	

== Sansui TV Awards ==
The Sansui TV Awards are annual honours presented by Sansui Electric in association with Sony Entertainment Television India in 2007 and in association with Zee Entertainment Enterprises in 2008 to the best performers on Indian Television in the preceding year.

The last ceremony was held in 2008 where Balaji Telefilms won 8 awards. Most of the awards were won by Kasamh Se which was one of the most popular show during the year.

Year	Event	Category	Recipient	Program	Result	Citation
2007	1st	Best Costumes	Nim Sood	Kasautii Zindagii Kay	Won	
2007	1st	Best Makeup	Kaushal Pal	Kasautii Zindagii Kay	Won	
2007	1st	Best Actress in Supporting Role (Jury)	Tina Parekh	Kasautii Zindagii Kay	Won	
2007	1st	Best Actress in Supporting Role (Popular)	Jennifer Winget	Kasautii Zindagii Kay	Won	
2007	1st	Best Actress in Negative Role (Popular)	Achint Kaur	Kyunki Saas Bhi Kabhi Bahu Thi	Won	
2007	1st	Best Actor in Lead Role (Jury)	Ram Kapoor	Kasamh Se	Won	
2007	1st	''Best Male Debut (Popular)	Pulkit Samrat	Kyunki Saas Bhi Kabhi Bahu Thi	Won	
2007	1st	Best Actress in Supporting Role (Popular)	Jennifer Winget	Kasautii Zindagii Kay	Won	
2007	1st	Best Actress in Lead Role (Popular)	Prachi Desai	Kasamh Se	Won	
2007	1st	Television Personality of the Year	Ronit Roy	Kasautii Zindagii Kay & Kyunki Saas Bhi Kabhi Bahu Thi	Won	
2007	1st	Best Director (Popular)	Yash Chauhan & Talat Jani	Kasamh Se	Won	
2007	1st	Best TV Show of the Year (Popular)	Ekta Kapoor & Shobha Kapoor	Kasamh Se	Won	
2008	2nd	Best Actor in Supporting Role (Jury)	Hiten Tejwani	Kyunki Saas Bhi Kabhi Bahu Thi	Won	
2008	2nd	Best Actor in Lead Role (Jury)	Ronit Roy	Kyunki Saas Bhi Kabhi Bahu Thi	Won	
2008	2nd	Best Actress in Supporting Role (Jury)	Gauri Pradhan Tejwani	Kyunki Saas Bhi Kabhi Bahu Thi	Won	
2008	2nd	Best Actress in Negative Role (Popular)	Ashwini Kalsekar	Kasamh Se	Won	
2008	2nd	Best Actor in Negative Role (Popular)	Akashdeep Saigal	Kyunki Saas Bhi Kabhi Bahu Thi	Won	
2008	2nd	Best Actor in Lead Role (Popular)	Ram Kapoor	Kasamh Se	Won	
2008	2nd	Best Actress in Lead Role (Popular)	Prachi Desai	Kasamh Se	Won	
2008	2nd	Best TV Show of the Year (Popular)	Ekta Kapoor, Shobha Kapoor	Kasamh Se	Won	

== Kalakar Awards ==
The Kalakar Awards are annual honours presented by Kalakar Parivaar Foundation in Kolkata to the best performers in Bollywood, Tollywood and Hindi Television in the preceding year.

The last ceremony was held in 2020 where the lead actors of Kasautii Zindagii Kay 2, Kundali Bhagya and Kavach (season 2) won top honours.

Year	Event	Category	Recipient	Program	Result	Citation
2002	10th	Best Actress	Manasi Salvi	Kohi Apna Sa	Won	
2003	11th	Best Singer	Priya Bhattacharya	Kahaani Ghar Ghar Ki	Won	
2003	11th	Best Actor (Popular)	Ali Asgar	Kahaani Ghar Ghar Ki	Won	
2003	11th	Best Actress (Popular)	Urvashi Dholakia	Kasautii Zindagii Kay	Won	
2003	11th	Best Director (Popular)	Ravindra Gautam	Kasautii Zindagii Kay	Won	
2003	11th	Best Serial (Popular)	Ekta Kapoor, Shobha Kapoor	Kohi Apna Sa	Won	
2004	12th	Best Singer	Priya Bhattacharya	Kyunki Saas Bhi Kabhi Bahu Thi	Won	
2004	12th	Best Actor (Jury)	Kiran Karmarkar	Kahaani Ghar Ghar Ki	Won	
2004	12th	Best Actress (Jury)	Jaya Bhattacharya	Kyunki Saas Bhi Kabhi Bahu Thi	Won	
2004	12th	Best Actor (Popular)	Ronit Roy	Kyunki Saas Bhi Kabhi Bahu Thi	Won	
2004	12th	Best Actress (Popular)	Sakshi Tanwar	Kahaani Ghar Ghar Ki	Won	
2005	13th	Best Actor (Popular)	Rajeev Khandelwal	Kahiin To Hoga	Won	
2005	13th	Best Actress (Popular)	Aamna Sharif	Kahiin To Hoga	Won	
2005	13th	Best Serial (Popular)	Ekta Kapoor, Shobha Kapoor	Kahiin To Hoga	Won	
2006	14th	Best Actor (Popular)	Iqbal Khan	Kaisa Ye Pyar Hai	Won	
2007	15th	Best Actress (Popular)	Prachi Desai	Kasamh Se	Won	
2007	15th	Best Serial (Popular)	Ekta Kapoor, Shobha Kapoor	Kasamh Se	Won	
2011	19th	Best Actor (Popular)	Sushant Singh Rajput	Pavitra Rishta	Won	
2011	19th	Best Actress (Popular)	Ankita Lokhande	Pavitra Rishta	Won	
2011	19th	Best Serial (Popular)	Ekta Kapoor, Shobha Kapoor	Pavitra Rishta	Won	
2012	20th	Best Serial (Popular)	Ekta Kapoor, Shobha Kapoor	Bade Achhe Lagte Hain	Won	
2013	21st	Best Actor (Popular)	Samir Soni	Parichay - Nayee Zindagi Kay Sapno Ka	Won	
2015	23rd	Best Direction (Popular)	Sameer Kulkarni	Kumkum Bhagya	Won	
2015	23rd	Best Actor (Popular)	Arjit Taneja	Kumkum Bhagya	Won	
2015	23rd	Rising TV Star (Female)	Sriti Jha	Kumkum Bhagya	Won	
2015	23rd	Rising TV Star (Male)	Shakti Arora	Meri Aashiqui Tumse Hi	Won	
2016	24th	Best Serial (Popular)	Ekta Kapoor, Shobha Kapoor	Meri Aashiqui Tumse Hi	Won	
2016	24th	Best Actress (Popular)	Radhika Madan	Meri Aashiqui Tumse Hi	Won	
2017	25th	Best Serial (Popular)	Ekta Kapoor, Shobha Kapoor	Naagin (season 2)	Won	
2017	25th	Best Actress (Popular)	Mouni Roy	Naagin (season 2)	Won	
2017	25th	Best Actor (Popular)	Karanvir Bohra	Naagin (season 2)	Won	
2017	25th	Best Actress in Negative Role	Adaa Khan	Naagin (season 2)	Won	
2018	26th	Best Serial (Popular)	Ekta Kapoor, Shobha Kapoor	Kundali Bhagya	Won	
2018	26th	Best Actress (Popular)	Shraddha Arya	Kundali Bhagya	Won	
2019	27th	Best Serial (Popular)	Ekta Kapoor, Shobha Kapoor	Kasautii Zindagii Kay 2	Won	
2019	27th	Best Actress (Popular)	Erica Fernandes	Kasautii Zindagii Kay 2	Won	
2019	27th	Best Actor in Negative Role	Sanjay Swaraj	Kasautii Zindagii Kay 2	Won	
2019	27th	Best Actress in Negative Role	Hina Khan	Kasautii Zindagii Kay 2	Won	
2020	28th	Best Actor (Jury)	Parth Samthaan	Kasautii Zindagii Kay 2	Won	
2020	28th	Best Actor (Popular)	Dheeraj Dhoopar	Kundali Bhagya	Won	
2020	28th	Best Actress (Popular)	Deepika Singh	Kavach Mahashivratri	Won	

== Zee Rishtey Awards ==
The Zee Rishtey Awards are annual honours presented by Zee Entertainment Enterprises to the actors and shows aired on Zee TV in various popular categories.

The last ceremony was held in 2022, where Kumkum Bhagya, Kundali Bhagya and Bhagya Lakshmi won a whopping twenty awards.

Year	Event	Category	Recipient	Program	Result	Citation
2011	2nd	Favorite Maa	Savita Prabhune	Pavitra Rishta	Won	
2011	2nd	Favorite Pita	Kishor Mahabole	Pavitra Rishta	Won	
2011	2nd	Favorite Beta	Hiten Tejwani	Pavitra Rishta	Won	
2011	2nd	Favorite Sautan	Pooja Pihal	Pavitra Rishta	Won	
2011	2nd	ZEE ki Shaan	Usha Nadkarni	Pavitra Rishta	Won	
2011	2nd	Favorite Character (Female)	Ankita Lokhande	Pavitra Rishta	Won	
2011	2nd	Favorite Parivaar	Ekta Kapoor	Pavitra Rishta	Won	
2012	3rd	Best Screenplay	Rajesh Joshi	Pavitra Rishta	Won	
2012	3rd	Favorite Jodi	Rithvik Dhanjani & Asha Negi	Pavitra Rishta	Won	
2012	3rd	Favorite Personality of the Year	Ankita Lokhande	Pavitra Rishta	Won	
2012	3rd	Favorite Dharavahik	Ekta Kapoor	Pavitra Rishta	Won	
2013	4th	Best Screenplay	Raju. M. Joshi & Anil Nagpal	Jodha Akbar	Won	
2013	4th	Favorite Nayi Jodi	Rajat Tokas & Paridhi Sharma	Jodha Akbar	Won	
2013	4th	Favorite Popular Character (Male)	Rajat Tokas	Jodha Akbar	Won	
2013	4th	Favorite Dharavahik	Ekta Kapoor	Jodha Akbar	Won	
2013	4th	Special Award; ZEE KI SHAAN	Ekta Kapoor	Pavitra Rishta	Won	
2014	5th	Favorite Beti	Sriti Jha	Kumkum Bhagya	Won	
2014	5th	Favorite Popular Character (Male)	Shabbir Ahluwalia	Kumkum Bhagya	Won	
2014	5th	Favorite Popular Character (Female)	Sriti Jha	Kumkum Bhagya	Won	
2014	5th	Favorite Kutumb	Ekta Kapoor	Kumkum Bhagya	Won	
2014	5th	Favorite Jodi	Rajat Tokas & Paridhi Sharma	Jodha Akbar	Won	
2014	5th	Favorite Dharavahik	Ekta Kapoor	Jodha Akbar	Won	
2014	5th	Special Award; ZEE Ka Rishta Sadaa Ke Liye	Ekta Kapoor	Pavitra Rishta	Won	
2015	6th	Favorite Pati	Shabbir Ahluwalia	Kumkum Bhagya	Won	
2015	6th	Favorite Patni	Sriti Jha	Kumkum Bhagya	Won	
2015	6th	Favorite Kutumb	Ekta Kapoor	Kumkum Bhagya	Won	
2015	6th	Favorite Jodi	Sriti Jha & Shabbir Ahluwalia	Kumkum Bhagya	Won	
2015	6th	Best Story	Anil Nagpal	Kumkum Bhagya	Won	
2016	7th	Favorite Bahu	Sriti Jha	Kumkum Bhagya	Won	
2016	7th	Favorite Sautan	Leena Jumani	Kumkum Bhagya	Won	
2016	7th	Favorite Popular Face (Male)	Shabbir Ahluwalia	Kumkum Bhagya	Won	
2016	7th	Favorite Popular Face (Female)	Sriti Jha	Kumkum Bhagya	Won	
2016	7th	Favorite Jodi	Shabbir Ahluwalia & Sriti Jha	Kumkum Bhagya	Won	
2016	7th	Favorite Dharavahik (Fiction)	Ekta Kapoor	Kumkum Bhagya	Won	
2016	7th	Zee Rishton Ki Parakh	Ekta Kapoor	Ye Hai Mohabbatein	Won	
2017	8th	Favorite Buzurg	Daljeet Soundh	Kumkum Bhagya	Won	
2017	8th	Favorite Maa	Supriya Shukla	Kumkum Bhagya	Won	
2017	8th	Favorite Bahu	Sriti Jha	Kumkum Bhagya	Won	
2017	8th	Favorite Beti	Sriti Jha	Kumkum Bhagya	Won	
2017	8th	Favorite Beta	Shabbir Ahluwalia	Kumkum Bhagya	Won	
2017	8th	Favorite Sautan	Leena Jumani	Kumkum Bhagya	Won	
2017	8th	Favorite Popular Face (Male)	Shabbir Ahluwalia	Kumkum Bhagya	Won	
2017	8th	Favorite Jodi	Shabbir Ahluwalia & Sriti Jha	Kumkum Bhagya	Won	
2017	8th	Favorite Dharavahik (Fiction)	Ekta Kapoor	Kumkum Bhagya	Won	
2017	8th	Favorite Popular Face (Female)	Shraddha Arya	Kundali Bhagya	Won	
2017	8th	Favorite Naya Sadasya (Male)	Dheeraj Dhoopar	Kundali Bhagya	Won	
2017	8th	Zee Rishton Ki Parakh	Ekta Kapoor	Naagin (season 2)	Won	
2017	8th	Zee Ki Shaan	Ekta Kapoor	Balaji Telefilms	Won	
2018	9th	Favorite Maa	Sriti Jha	Kumkum Bhagya	Won	
2018	9th	Favorite Pitah	Shabbir Ahluwalia	Kumkum Bhagya	Won	
2018	9th	Favorite Pitah	Mishal Raheja	Kumkum Bhagya	Won	
2018	9th	Favorite Chota Sadasya	Kaurwakee Vasistha	Kumkum Bhagya	Won	
2018	9th	Favorite Chota Sadasya	Vedaansh Jaju	Kumkum Bhagya	Won	
2018	9th	Favorite Beta	Shabbir Ahluwalia	Kumkum Bhagya	Won	
2018	9th	Favorite Bhai	Manit Joura	Kundali Bhagya	Won	
2018	9th	Favorite Khalnayak Jodi	Ruhi Chaturvedi & Sanjay Gagnani	Kundali Bhagya	Won	
2018	9th	Favorite Popular Face (Male)	Dheeraj Dhoopar	Kundali Bhagya	Won	
2018	9th	Favorite Popular Face (Female)	Shraddha Arya	Kundali Bhagya	Won	
2018	9th	Favorite Jodi	Sriti Jha & Shabbir Ahluwalia	Kumkum Bhagya	Won	
2018	9th	Favorite Popular Character (Male) (on Zee5)	Shabbir Ahluwalia	Kumkum Bhagya	Won	
2018	9th	Favorite Popular Character (Female) (on Zee5)	Sriti Jha	Kumkum Bhagya	Won	
2018	9th	Favorite Dharavahik (on Zee5)	Ekta Kapoor	Kundali Bhagya	Won	
2019	10th	Favorite Bhai	Manit Joura	Kundali Bhagya	Won	
2019	10th	Favorite Behen	Anjum Fakih	Kundali Bhagya	Won	
2019	10th	Social Swagger of the Year	Dheeraj Dhoopar	Kundali Bhagya	Won	
2019	10th	Favorite Jodi	Shraddha Arya & Dheeraj Dhoopar	Kundali Bhagya	Won	
2019	10th	Favorite Naya Sadasya (Male)	Krishna Kaul	Kumkum Bhagya	Won	
2019	10th	Favorite Naya Sadasya (Female)	Mugdha Chaphekar	Kumkum Bhagya	Won	
2019	10th	Favorite Naya Sadasya (Female)	Naina Singh	Kumkum Bhagya	Won	
2019	10th	Favorite Popular Face (Male)	Shabbir Ahluwalia	Kumkum Bhagya	Won	
2019	10th	Zee Ki Shaan	Sriti Jha & Shabbir Ahluwalia	Kumkum Bhagya	Won	
2019	10th	Favorite Kutumb	Ekta Kapoor	Kumkum Bhagya	Won	
2019	10th	Favorite Popular Character (Male) (on Zee5)	Dheeraj Dhoopar	Kundali Bhagya	Won	
2019	10th	Favorite Popular Character (Female) (on Zee5)	Shraddha Arya	Kundali Bhagya	Won	
2019	10th	Favorite Dharavahik (on Zee5)	Ekta Kapoor	Kundali Bhagya	Won	
2019	10th	Favorite Khalnayak Jodi	Ankit Mohan & Gayathri Iyer	Haiwaan : The Monster	Won	
2020	11th	Favorite Bhai	Manit Joura	Kundali Bhagya	Won	
2020	11th	Favorite Behen	Anjum Fakih	Kundali Bhagya	Won	
2020	11th	Favorite Khalnayak Jodi	Sanjay Gagnani, Ruhi Chaturvedi, Swati Kapoor	Kundali Bhagya	Won	
2020	11th	Favorite Bahu	Shraddha Arya	Kundali Bhagya	Won	
2020	11th	Favorite Character (Female) (on ZEE5)	Shraddha Arya	Kundali Bhagya	Won	
2020	11th	Favorite Jodi	Dheeraj Dhoopar & Shraddha Arya	Kundali Bhagya	Won	
2020	11th	Favorite Dharavahik	Ekta Kapoor	Kundali Bhagya	Won	
2020	11th	Favorite Beti	Mughda Chapekar & Pooja Banerjee	Kumkum Bhagya	Won	
2020	11th	Favorite Character (Female)	Sriti Jha	Kumkum Bhagya	Won	
2020	11th	Favorite Character (Male)	Shabir Ahluwalia	Kumkum Bhagya	Won	
2020	11th	Favorite Parivaar	Ekta Kapoor	Kumkum Bhagya	Won	
2020	11th	Favorite Nayi Jodi	Pearl V Puri & Nikki Sharma	Brahmarakshas (season 2)	Won	
2021	13th	Favorite Beta	Rohit Suchanti	Bhagya Lakshmi	Won	Won
2021	13th	Favorite Bahu	Aishwarya Khare	Bhagya Lakshmi		Won
2021	13th	Favorite Beti	Aishwarya Khare	Bhagya Lakshmi		Won
2021	13th	Favorite Behen	Munira Kudrati	Bhagya Lakshmi		Won
2021	13th	Favorite Bhai	Aman Gandhi	Bhagya Lakshmi		Won
2021	13th	Favorite Parivaar	Ekta Kapoor	Bhagya Lakshmi		Won
2021	13th	Favorite Jodi	Dheeraj Dhoopar & Shraddha Arya	Kundali Bhagya		Won
2021	13th	Favorite Character (Male)	Dheeraj Dhoopar	Kundali Bhagya		Won
2021	13th	Favorite Character (Female)	Shraddha Arya	Kundali Bhagya		Won
2021	13th	Favorite Social Swagger	Shraddha Arya	Kundali Bhagya		Won
2021	13th	Favorite Maa	Supriya Shukla	Kundali Bhagya		Won
2021	13th	Favorite Saas	Anisha Hinduja	Kundali Bhagya		Won
2021	13th	Favorite Dharavahik (On ZEE5)	Ekta Kapoor	Kundali Bhagya		Won
2021	13th	Favorite Character Male (On ZEE5)	Krishna Kaul	Kumkum Bhagya		Won
2021	13th	Favorite Character Female (On ZEE5)		Kumkum Bhagya	Mugdha Chaphekar	Won
2021	13th	Favorite Beti		Kumkum Bhagya	Mugdha Chaphekar	Won
2021	13th	ZEE Ki Shaan	Sriti Jha & Shabir Ahluwalia	Kumkum Bhagya		Won
2021	13th	Favorite Dharavahik	Ekta Kapoor	Kumkum Bhagya		Won
2021	13th	Best Writer	Anil Nagpal & Kavita Nagpal	Kumkum Bhagya, Kundali Bhagya & Bhagya Lakshmi		Won
2022	13th	Favorite Bhai	Rohit Suchanti	Bhagya Lakshmi	Won	
2022	13th	Favorite Behen	Shivani Jha	Bhagya Lakshmi	Won	
2022	13th	Favorite Saas	Smita Bansal	Bhagya Lakshmi	Won	
2022	13th	Favorite Sasur	Uday Tikekar	Bhagya Lakshmi	Won	
2022	13th	Favorite Buzurg	Neena Cheema	Bhagya Lakshmi	Won	
2022	13th	Favorite Bahu	Aishwarya Khare	Bhagya Lakshmi	Won	
2022	13th	Favorite Bhabhi	Aishwarya Khare	Bhagya Lakshmi	Won	
2022	13th	Favorite Character (Female)	Aishwarya Khare	Bhagya Lakshmi	Won	
2022	13th	Favorite Parivaar	Ekta Kapoor	Bhagya Lakshmi	Won	
2022	13th	Favorite Jodi	Shakti Arora & Shraddha Arya	Kundali Bhagya	Won	
2022	13th	Favorite Naya Sadasya (Male)	Shakti Arora	Kundali Bhagya	Won	
2022	13th	Favorite Chota Sadasya	Ananya Gambhir	Kundali Bhagya	Won	
2022	13th	Favorite Khalnayak	Sanjay Gagnani	Kundali Bhagya	Won	
2022	13th	Favorite Social Swagger	Shraddha Arya	Kundali Bhagya	Won	
2022	13th	Favorite Character Male (On ZEE5)	Krishna Kaul	Kumkum Bhagya	Won	
2022	13th	Favorite Beta	Krishna Kaul	Kumkum Bhagya	Won	
2022	13th	Favorite Character Female (On ZEE5)	Mugdha Chaphekar	Kumkum Bhagya	Won	
2022	13th	Favorite Patni	Mugdha Chaphekar	Kumkum Bhagya	Won	
2022	13th	Favorite Sautan	Tina Philip	Kumkum Bhagya	Won	
2022	13th	Favorite Dharavahik (On ZEE5)	Ekta Kapoor	Kumkum Bhagya	Won	
2022	13th	Best Writer	Anil Nagpal & Kavita Nagpal	Kumkum Bhagya, Kundali Bhagya & Bhagya Lakshmi	Won	
