= Swim Team (TV series) =

- Genre: Youth show
- Created by: Shalini Harshwal
- Screenplay by: Suhani Kanwar; Ritu Bhatia; Nihar Mehta
- Directed by: Khuzema Haveliwala; Mir Mohsin Manzoor
- Creative directors: Aapar Gupta; Meeit Kohli
- Starring: See Below
- Music by: Sargam Jassu
- Country of origin: India
- Original language: Hindi
- No. of seasons: 5
- No. of episodes: 245

Production
- Producer: Praver Awal
- Production location: Mumbai
- Cinematography: Srini Rammaiya
- Camera setup: Multi-camera
- Running time: Approx. 22 minutes
- Production company: Endemol India Pvt Ltd

Original release
- Network: Channel V India
- Release: 9 March 2015 – 19 February 2016

Swim Team is an Indian television series that aired on Channel V India from 9 March 2015 to 19 February 2016.

== Cast ==
- Pooja Banerjee as Rewa Mathur
- Ashmita Jaggi as Umang Tandon
- Shekhar Gill / Samridh Bawa as Bhagat Kapadia
- Lovekesh Solanki as Neil Chaudhary
- Ishaan Singh Manhas as Head Coach Jugnu Singh
- Amit Joshi as Jai Tandon
- Esha Chawla as Priyanka "Pixie" Khanna
- Priyamvada Kant as Kanika Jamwal
- Minaz Fruitwala as Deepam Yadav
- Amit Gaur as Coach Tarun Kapoor
- Pooja Bhamrah as Dr. Sana Ashraf
- Mallika Nayak as Ms. Mathur
