= Personality of the year =

Personality of the year is a title awarded by a number of organisations or publications, such as:

- BBC Sports Personality of the Year
- RTÉ Sports Person of the Year
- IFFI Indian Film Personality of the Year Award
- Indian Telly Award for Best Television Personality of the Year
- Radio Music Awards
- Radio and Records
