= Indian Telly Award for Best Drama Series =

Indian television award category

- Awarded for: Best Drama Series
- Country: India
- First award: 2002
- Currently held by: Anupamaa; Udne Ki Aasha
- Website: Indian Telly Awards

Indian Telly Awards for Best Drama Series is an award given by the jury as a part of its annual event.

== Winners ==
Year	Show	Network
2002	Kasautii Zindagii Kay	Star Plus
2003	Kasautii Zindagii Kay	Star Plus
2004	Kasautii Zindagii Kay	Star Plus
2005	Kkavyanjali	Star Plus
2006	Kasamh Se	Zee Tv
2007	Kasautii Zindagii Kay	Star Plus
2009	Bandini	Imagine TV
2010	Tere Liye	Star Plus
2012	Bade Achhe Lagte Hain	Sony TV
2013	Kya Huaa Tera Vaada	Sony TV
2013	Yeh Rishta Kya Kehlata Hai	Star Plus
2014	Yeh Rishta Kya Kehlata Hai	Star Plus
2019	Patiala Babes	Sony TV
2023	Main Hoon Aparajita	Zee TV
2025	Anupamaa; Udne Ki Aasha	Star Plus
