= Leena Jumani =

Indian actress

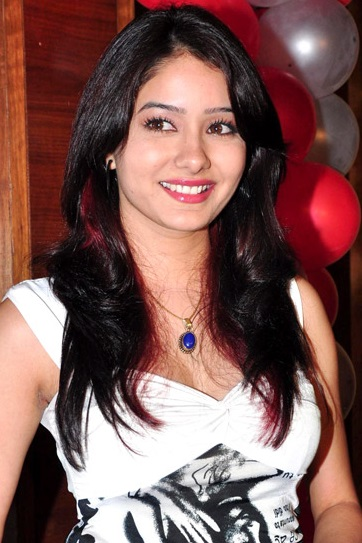
- Leena Jumani in 2016
- Born: Ahmedabad, Gujarat, India
- Occupations: Model; actress
- Years active: 2009–present

Leena Jumani is an Indian actress and model, best known as Tanushree Mehta in Kumkum Bhagya.

She played Khemi, a poor village girl, in the television series Bandini. This was followed with the role of Suhasi in the show Koi Aane Ko Hai. She appeared in a special episode of Tujh Sang Preet Lagai Sajna (star plus) and in Aahat, and had a cameo in Tere Liye. Next, she played the lead role of Pakhi in Ganga Kii Dheej. She played the female lead role of Ira in Chhoti Si Zindagi. Her other roles include Paridhi in Punar Vivah, Piya in Piya Ka Ghar Pyaara Lage and Antara in Amita Ka Amit. She played the role of main antagonist Tanushree in Kumkum Bhagya. She left the show in 2019 however returned in 2021 but permanently left the series in 2022. She also played the lead role in Vikram Bhatt's Maaya 2 opposite Priyal Gor. She played a part in the film Himmatwala and also took part in the reality show Madventures - Ary Digital Pakistan. Jumani, a Sindhi, was born and raised in Ahmedabad, Gujarat, India.

== Filmography ==
=== Television ===
| Year | Title | Role | Ref |
|---|---|---|---|
| 2009 | Koi Ane ko Hai | Suhasi | |
| 2009–2010 | Bandini | Khemi | |
| 2009 | Baytaab Dil Kee Tamanna Hai | | |
| 2010 | Shubh Vivah | | |
| 2010 | Tujh Sang Preet Lagai Sajna | | |
| 2010 | Aahat | | |
| 2010 | Tere Liye | | |
| 2010–2011 | Ganga Kii Dheej | Pakhi | |
| 2011 | Ek Nayi Chhoti Si Zindagi | Ira Shyam / Kajal | |
| 2012 | Adaalat | | |
| 2012 | Humne Li hai Shapath | | |
| 2012–2013 | Punar Vivah | Paridhi | |
| 2012 | Kairi | | |
| 2013 | Piya Ka Ghar Pyaara Lage | Piya Nanavati | |
| 2013 | Madventures - Ary Digital | | |
| 2013 | Amita Ka Amit | Antara | |
| 2013 | Gustakh Dil | | |
| 2014–2022 | Kumkum Bhagya | Tanushree "Tanu" Mehta | |
| 2016 | Kavach...Kaali Shaktiyon Se | a woman under possession of an evil spirit in the first episode(cameo) | |
| 2018 | Mistresses | Sofia | |
| 2020 | Haiwaan : The Monster | Disha | |
| 2022 | Appnapan – Badalte Rishton Ka Bandhan | Sonali | |
| 2023–2024 | Baatein Kuch Ankahee Si | Sonia | |
| 2025–2026 | Mannat – Har Khushi Paane Ki | Yashika | |
| 2026–present | Apsara | Apsara Chitralekha | |

=== Films ===
| Year | Title | Role | Language | Ref |
|---|---|---|---|---|
| 2013 | Himmatwala | Padma | Hindi | |
| 2014 | Sathiyo Chalyo Khodaldham | Arushi Patel | Gujarati | |
| 2018 | Pardesi Dhola | | Gujarati | |
| 2021 | X6 | | Hindi | |
| 2021 | Ek Anjaan Rishtey Ka Guilt | | Hindi | |
| 2022 | Ek Anjaan Rishtey Ka Guilt 2 | | Hindi | |
| 2022 | Hey Kem Chho London | | Gujarati | |

=== Web series ===
| Year | Title | Role | Platform |
|---|---|---|---|
| 2018 | Maaya 2 | Ruhi Ahuja Simmi's Friend vb on the web | |
| 2021 | Bisaat | | MX Player |
| 2021 | Paro | | ullu |
| 2021 | Client No. 7 | | Ullu |
| 2023 | Guilt 2 | | Shemaroo |
