= Pooja Banerjee =

Indian television actress

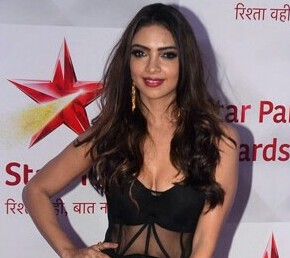
- Banerjee at Star Parivaar Awards 2018
- Born: 8 November 1991 (age 35); Aligarh, Uttar Pradesh, India
- Occupation: Actress
- Years active: 2011–present
- Known for: Kumkum Bhagya; Kasautii Zindagii Kay; Kehne Ko Humsafar Hain
- Spouse: Sandeep Sejwal (m. 2017)
- Children: 2

Pooja Banerjee (born 8 November 1991) is an Indian actress who appears in Hindi television. She began her television career as a contestant in MTV Roadies and subsequently starred as Tejal Majumdar in her first lead show, Ek Doosre Se Karte Hain Pyaar Hum.

She gained initial fame by teaming up with Ekta Kapoor for few temporary supporting roles in Chandrakanta, Chandra Nandini and Dil Hi Toh Hai. Shortly thereafter, Banerjee became a household name and gained wider popularity with her roles in Kapoor's hugely successful shows Kasautii Zindagii Kay as Nivedita Basu and Kumkum Bhagya as Rhea Mehra. Since 2018, she was also playing the pivotal character of Bani Mehra in 3 seasons of Kapoor's web series Kehne Ko Humsafar Hain.

== Career ==
Banerjee started her acting career in 2011, participating in MTV Roadies season 8. Her 1st fiction show came in 2012 with Ek Doosre Se Karte Hain Pyaar Hum on StarPlus, in which she portrayed the lead role of Tejal Majumdar. In 2013, she was cast in fantasy show The Adventures of Hatim on Life OK as Perizaad.

That year Banerjee acted in Sahara One show Ghar Aaja Pardesi in the role of Rudraani. Shortly thereafter, she went on to be a contestant in the first season of Box Cricket League and appear as Rewa Mathur in Channel V's youth drama Swim Team.

In 2016, Banerjee found her first break as Noorie Shastri opposite Pearl V Puri in Life OK drama show Naagarjuna.

In 2017, she was cast in supporting roles as the antagonistic Vishakha in the historical romance Chandra Nandini and as Suryakanta in the fantasy drama Chandrakanta.

She next returned to reality television as a contestant in fourth season of Box Cricket League and was cast in June 2018 to play Aarohi Verma in the romance Dil Hi Toh Hai, a character that she later reprised in season 2 that was streamed directly on ALT Balaji. She also had a cameo appearance as Sonprabha in the fantasy drama Vikram Betaal Ki Rahasya Gatha. In September 2018, Banerjee appeared as the stylish yet married Nivedita Basu in Kasautii Zindagii Kay, that ended after a successful two years run in October 2020.

From 2018 to 2020, she was also seen starring as Bani Mehra in the web series Kehne Ko Humsafar Hain, and participated in Nach Baliye season 9 in 2019. In 2020 she featured in the web series The Casino.

From 2020 to 2022, Banerjee played the grey-shaded lead character of Rhea Mehra in the daily soap Kumkum Bhagya.

== Personal life ==
Banerjee married professional Indian Swimmer, Sandeep Sejwal on 28 February 2017. The couple had their first child, a baby girl who they named Sana on 12 March 2022. The couple welcomed their second child, a son Tavas on 7 June 2025.

== Filmography ==
=== Television ===
Year	Title	Role	Ref.
2011	MTV Roadies	Contestant	
2012	Ek Doosre Se Karte Hain Pyaar Hum	Tejal Mazumdar	
2013–2014	The Adventures of Hatim	Perizaad	
2013	Ghar Aaja Pardesi	Rudrani	
2014–2015	Box Cricket League 1	Contestant	
2015–2016	Swim Team	Rewa Mathur	
2015	Halla Bol 2	Meera	
2015	Maan Na Maan Main Tera Mehmaan	Anarkali	
2016-2017	Naagarjuna – Ek Yoddha	Noori Shastri	
2017	Chandra Nandini	Vishakha	
2017	Chandrakanta	Soorya	
2018	Box Cricket League 3	Contestant	
2018	Dil Hi Toh Hai	Aarohi	
2018	Vikram Betaal Ki Rahasya Gatha	Sonprabha	
2018–2020	Kasautii Zindagii Kay	Nivedita Basu Sengupta	
2019	Box Cricket League 4	Contestant	
2019	Nach Baliye 9	Contestant	
2020–2022	Kumkum Bhagya	Rhea Mehra	
2023	Bade Achhe Lagte Hain 2	Pihu Kapoor	
2026–present	Dil Ki Bewafaiyaan		

=== Web series ===
Year	Title	Role	Ref.
2018	Kehne Ko Humsafar Hain	Bani Mehra	
2019	Only for singles	Appu	
2020	The Casino	Riya Marwah	
