= Kumkum Bhagya =

Indian drama television series

- Genre: Soap opera Drama; Romance
- Created by: Ekta Kapoor
- Based on: Sense and Sensibility by Jane Austen
- Developed by: Ekta Kapoor
- Written by: Manoj Tripathi; Pravesh Joshi; Dialogues: Dheeraj Sarna; Vikash tiwari
- Screenplay by: Anil Nagpal; Mrinal Tripathi
- Story by: Anil Nagpal
- Directed by: Ishmail Umar Khan; Ravindra Gautam; Sameer Kulkarni; Neeraj Baliyan; Sharad Pandey; Jeetu Arora; Deepak Chavan; Shahnawaz Khan; Khalid Akhtar; Muzammil Desai; Nitesh Mishra
- Creative directors: Shaalu; Nitin Dhall; Rajan Prachi; Tanya Rajesh; Kiran Gupta; Ashwini Pai; Rohit Burman; Ankush Kumar; Ashna Srivastava
- Starring: Sriti Jha Shabir Ahluwalia Krishna Kaul Mugdha Chaphekar Rachi Sharma Abrar Qazi Pranali Rathod Akshay Bindra Namik Paul
- Theme music composer: Lalit Sen; Nawab Arzoo
- Opening theme: "O Rabba Ki Karaan" by Pamela Jain
- Composers: Binod Ghimre; Arnab Dutta
- Country of origin: India
- Original language: Hindi
- No. of seasons: 4
- No. of episodes: 3,208

Production
- Executive producers: Tanushree Das Gupta; Gautam Kumar; Samar Ashok Thakur
- Producers: Ekta Kapoor; Shobha Kapoor
- Cinematography: Sanjay Memane; Anil Katke; Shambhu Ojha; Ganesh Sankla; Chandrashekhar Nagarkar
- Editors: Vishwa Bandhu Giri; Vishal Sharma; Vikas Sharma; Harish B. Awasthi
- Camera setup: Multi-camera
- Running time: 22–40 minutes
- Production company: Balaji Telefilms Limited

Original release
- Network: Zee TV
- Release: 15 April 2014 – 21 September 2025

Related
- Kundali Bhagya; Bhagya Lakshmi

Kumkum Bhagya (transl. Vermillion in My Fate) is an Indian Hindi-language romantic melodrama television series produced by Ekta Kapoor under Balaji Telefilms. It aired from 15 April 2014 to 21 September 2025 on Zee TV and digitally streams on ZEE5. It starred Sriti Jha, Shabir Ahluwalia, Mugdha Chaphekar, Krishna Kaul, Rachi Sharma, Abrar Qazi, Pranali Rathod and Namik Paul in lead roles. One of the longest running Indian television soap opera, the concept of the show was originally based on Jane Austen's novel Sense and Sensibility.

== Plot ==
The series begins with Pragya Arora, a college lecturer, and Abhishek “Abhi” Mehra, a wealthy rock star, whose marriage is arranged through family intervention. Their relationship is initially strained due to manipulations by Abhi’s sister Aliya and his former partner Tanu. The narrative follows repeated misunderstandings, conspiracies, memory-loss incidents, and separations. Despite numerous obstacles, Pragya and Abhi reconcile multiple times. The birth of their twin daughters, Prachi and Rhea, coincides with another major separation, leading to the children being raised apart.

After a twenty-year leap, the story focuses on Prachi Arora and Rhea Mehra, who grow up unaware they are twin sisters. Prachi develops a relationship with Ranbir Kohli, while Rhea’s feelings for him create rivalry. Family interference and concealed truths complicate their lives until the sisters’ true parentage is revealed. Although Abhi and Pragya briefly reunite with their daughters, continued misunderstandings affect the family. Prachi eventually marries Ranbir, but their relationship faces many challenges arising from Ranbir's family, Rhea's obsession for Ranbir and many other misunderstandings.

A further leap introduces Prachi and Ranbir’s daughters, Khushi and Poorvi. Raised in different circumstances due to family conflict, the sisters’ lives unfold amid hidden identities and inherited tensions. Poorvi’s relationship with Rajvansh Malhotra becomes central to this phase. As past grievances resurface, the family once again confronts separation and reconciliation.

Another generational transition introduces new protagonists, including Prarthana Parikh and Shivansh Randhawa, whose lives intersect through family and business alliances connected to earlier characters. Their relationship is shaped by mistrust, rivalry, and concealed motives. While legacy figures appear intermittently, the storyline centres on the younger generation navigating conflicts rooted in the family’s past, continuing the series’ recurring themes of destiny and reunion.

== Cast ==
=== Main ===
- Sriti Jha as Pragya Arora Mehra: Raghuveer and Sarla's eldest daughter; Preeta, Bulbul and Shrishti's elder sister; Abhishek's wife; Kiara, Prachi and Rhea's mother (2014–2021; 2023)
- Shabir Ahluwalia as Abhishek "Abhi" Mehra: Prem and Santoshi's son; Alia's brother; Pragya's husband; Kiara, Prachi and Rhea's father (2014–2021; 2023)
- Mugdha Chaphekar as Prachi Arora Kohli: Abhishek and Pragya's second daughter; Kiara's younger and Rhea's elder twin sister; Ranbir's wife; Khushi and Poorvi's mother (2019–2024)
- Krishna Kaul as Ranbir Kohli: Vikram and Pallavi's son; Prachi's husband; Khushi and Poorvi's father (2019–2024)
- Rachi Sharma as Poorvi Kohli Malhotra: Ranbir and Prachi's younger daughter; Khushi's younger sister; Rajvansh's wife; Prarthana's mother (2023–2025)
- Abrar Qazi as Rajvansh "RV" Malhotra: Harman and Harleen's younger son; Vikrant's brother; Poorvi's husband; Prarthana's father (2023–2025)
- Pranali Rathod as Prarthana Parikh Randhawa: Rajvansh and Poorvi's biological daughter; Kishan and Seema's adopted daughter; Shivansh's wife (2025)
- Namik Paul as Shivansh Randhawa: Smita's son; Prarthana's husband (2025)

=== Recurring ===
- Mrunal Thakur as Bulbul Arora Khanna: Sarla and Raghuveer's third daughter; Pragya and Preeta's younger sister; Purab's first wife (2014–2016)
- Supriya Shukla as Sarla Arora: Raghuveer's widow; Pragya, Bulbul, Preeta and Shrishti's mother (2014–2018)
- Madhu Raja as Daljeet Kaur Arora: Raghuveer's mother (2014–2018)
- Jasjeet Babbar as Janki: The Aroras' handmaiden; Poorvi's mother (2014–2018)
- Arjit Taneja as Purab Khanna: Abhi's best friend; Bulbul's widower; Disha's ex-husband; Alia's husband; Sunny and Aryan's father (2014–2016)
  - Vin Rana replaced Taneja as Purab (2016–2021)
- Madhurima Tuli as Tanushree "Tanu" Mehta: Alia's best friend (2014)
  - Leena Jumani replaced Tuli as Tanu (2014–2021)
- Akshay Bindra as Raunak Zaveri: Kanti and Smita's son (2025)
- Kanupriya Pandit as Sweety: Pragya and Bulbul's aunt (2014)
- Faisal Rashid as Suresh Shrivastav: Rachna's brother (2014–2015)
- Daljeet Soundh as Daljeet Kaur Mehra: Swarni and Indu's sister (2014–2018)
- Charu Mehra as Poorvi: Janki's daughter; Pragya and Bulbul's namesake sister (2014–2015)
- Neel Motwani as Corporator Neil Thakur (2014–2015)
- Shikha Singh as Alia Mehra Khanna: Santoshi and Prem's daughter; Abhishek's sister; Purab's third wife and Aryan's mother (2014–2020)
  - Reyhna Malhotra replaced Singh as Alia (2020–2023)
- Shivaani Sopuri as Parminder "Pammi" Kaur Mehra: Ajay's wife (2014–2021)
- Ajay Trehan as Ajay Mehra: Daljeet's elder son; Prem's brother (2014–2020)
- Ankit Mohan as Akash Mehra: Parminder and Ajay's younger son (2014–2016)
- Aditi Rathore as Rachna Shrivastav Mehra: Suresh's sister (2014–2016)
- Zarina Khan as Inderjit Kaur Suri: Daljeet and Swarni's sister (2014–2020)
- Radha Israni as Swarni Dasi: Abhi, Alia, Raj and Akash's grand-aunt (2014–2018)
  - Asha Sharma replaced Israni as Swarni (2018–2020)
- Anurag Sharma as Raj Mehra: Parminder and Ajay's elder son (2014–2021)
- Samikssha Batnagar as Mitali Mehra: Raj's wife (2014)
  - Swati Anand replaced Batnagar as Mitali (2014–2021)
- Haelyn Shastri as News Reporter (2015)
- Nikhil Arya as Nikhil Sood: Tanu's ex-lover (2015–2017)
  - Rajat Dahiya replaced Arya as Nikhil (2017–2018)
  - Shaad Randhawa replaced Dahiya as Nikhil (2018–2019)
- Bobby Khanna as Mr. Mehta: Tanu's father (2015–2017)
- Roma Lavani as Mrs. Mehta: Tanu's mother (2015–2018)
- Pratik Parihar as Manohar: Abhi's accountant who schemed against Pragya (2016)
- Vijay Kashyap as Raghuveer Arora: Daljeet's son; Sarla's husband; Pragya, Bulbul, Preeta and Shrishti's father (2017)
- Nitin Goswami as Dushyant Rana: Simonica's husband who was accidentally killed by Abhishek (2017–2018)
- Ruchi Savarn as Disha Singh: Purab's ex-wife; Sunny's mother (2017–2019)
- Sharhaan Singh as Sangram Singh Chautala: Disha's ex-fiancé (2017–2018)
- Vivana Singh as Simonica Dushyant Rana: Dushyant's widow (2017–2018)
- Shwetanshu Singh as Dr. Sheila (2017)
- Mishal Raheja as King Singh: A rapper based in the UK; Pragya's former boss and one-sided lover (2018–2019)
- Kaurwaki Vasistha as Kiara Mehra: Pragya and Abhi's eldest daughter; Prachi and Rhea's elder sister (2018–2019)
- Vedansh Jaju as Sunny Khanna: Purab and Disha's son (2018–2019)
- Richa Rathore as Neha "Babli" Mehra: Mitali and Raj's daughter (2018)
- Abeer Adil as Tarun: King's cousin; Neha's husband (2018–2019)
- Roma Bali as Tarun's mother: King's aunt (2018–2019)
- Naina Singh as Rhea Mehra: Pragya and Abhi's youngest daughter; Kiara and Prachi's younger sister (2019–2020)
  - Pooja Banerjee replaced Singh as Rhea (2020–2022)
  - Tina Philip replaced Banerjee as Rhea (2022–2023)
- Mehul Kajaria as Vikram Kohli: Daljeet's eldest son; Vikrant and Arun's elder brother; Pallavi's husband; Ranbir's father (2019–2021)
  - Rushad Rana replaced Kajaria as Vikram (2021–2023)
- Khyati Keswani as Pallavi Kohli: Vikram's wife; Ranbir's mother (2019–2023)
- Kiran Bhargava as Daljeet "Dida" Kohli: Vikram, Vikrant and Arun's mother; Ranbir, Siddharth and Mihika's grandmother (2019–2022)
  - Smita Shetty replaced Bhargava as Daljeet "Dida" (2022-2023)
- Pooja Singh as Mishti Kohli: Vikram and Pallavi's daughter; Ranbir's sister (2019)
- Jaanvi Sangwan as Beeji: A nurse who took Pragya in after the latter's exile; Shahana's paternal grandmother (2019)
- Aparna Mishra as Shahana Sharma: Beeji's granddaughter; Pragya's niece-figure; Prachi's sister-figure; Aryan's love interest (2019–2023)
- Zeeshan Khan as Aryan Khanna: Alia and Purab's son; Sunny's half-brother (2019–2021)
  - Pulkit Bangia replaced Khan as Aryan (2022–2023)
  - Naveen Sharma replaced Bangia as Aryan (2023)
- Ashlesha Sawant as Meera: Rhea's foster mother and Abhi's ex-fiancé (2019–2021)
- Manmohan Tiwari as Rohit "Sanju" Gill: A local gangster of Hoshiarpur; Prachi's obsessive one-sided lover (2019–2020)
- Ashwini Tobe as Dimpy: Rhea's friend (2019–2020)
- Shivali Choudhry as Shaina: Rhea's friend (2019–2022)
- Neena Cheema as Sarita Ben: A Gujrati women who gave refuge to Pragya and Prachi; Rishi's maternal grandmother (2019–2020)
  - Rupa Divetia replaced Cheema as Sarita Bengaluru (2020–2021)
- Gautam Nain as Rishi Dhaval: Sarita's grandson (2019)
- Kajal Chauhan as Priyanka Rane: Abhi's friend's daughter; Rishi's obsessive lover (2019)
- Sonali Joshi as Chief Minister Vasudha (2019)
- Ribbhu Mehra as Ritik: Disha's friend and secret lover (2019)
- Farida Dadi as Baljeet Mehra: Abhi, Raj, Akash and Alia's grand-aunt (2020–2021/2023)
- Rose Khan as Maya Choubey: Ranbir's ex-fiancée (2020)
- Manish Khanna as Dushyant Singh Choubey: Maya's uncle (2020)
- Bhupendra Khuranna as Mr. Choubey: Maya's father, Dushyant's younger brother (2020)
- Anuradha Sharma as Mrs. Choubey: Maya's mother (2020)
- Naina Yadav as Palak: Prachi and Shahana's friend (2021)
- Gagan Anand as Digvijay: Abhishek's business rival (2021)
- Gazala Silawat as Pari: Rhea's friend (2021)
- Rohit Choudhary as Pradeep Khurana: Tanu's ex-husband (2021)
- Dolly Sohi as Sushma Tandon: A rich businesswoman and Pragya's mentor (2021)
- Vineet Kumar Chaudhary as Gautam Thapar: A businessman; Sushma and Pragya's business partner; Pragya's one-sided lover (2021)
- Jatin Shah as Gaurav Thapar: Gautam's elder brother (2021)
- Riyaz Panjwani as Mr. Thapar: Gaurav and Gautam's father (2021)
- Kushagra Nautiyal as Siddharth "Sid" Kohli: Vikrant's son; Mihika's brother and Rhea's ex-husband (2021–2023)
- Shamik Abbas as Arun Kohli: Daljeet's youngest son; Vikram and Vikrant's younger brother (2021)
- Mridula Oberoi as Teji Kohli: Arun's wife (2021)
- Abhishek Kumar as Jai Bhatt: Ranbir's best friend (2021–2022)
- Gulshan Shivani as Stanley: Ranbir's assistant (2022)
- Aishana Singh as Mihika Kohli: Vikrant's daughter; Siddharth's sister; Ranbir's cousin sister (2022–2023)
- Veronica Talreja as Mili: Aryan's ex-girlfriend and friend (2022)
- Mimicharve Khadse as Mauli: a girl whom Prachi loved as her own after she lost Panchi (2023)
- Aalisha Panwar as Kaya Malhotra: Ranbir's former boss and Prachi's friend (2023)
- Simran Budharup as Khushi "Panchi" Kohli Randhawa: Ranbir and Prachi's elder daughter; Poorvi's elder sister and Armaan's Wife (2023–2024)
  - Jyotsna Chandola replaced Budharup as Khushi (2024-2025)
  - Trisha Rohatgi as child Khushi (2023)
- Abhishek Malik as Akshay Tandon: Ashok's son; Mihika's brother (2023)
- Aafreen Dabestani as Mihika Tandon: Ashok's daughter; Akshay's sister (2023)
- Mallika Nayak as Manpreet Tandon: Ashok's second wife (2023–2024)
- Kaushal Kapoor as Ashok Tandon: Prachi's former boss and father figure; Vishakha's brother (2023–2024)
- Utkarsha Naik as Vishakha Tandon: Ashok's sister; Divya's mother (2023–2024)
- Riya Kapoor as Divya Tandon: Vishakha's daughter; (2023)
  - Mahira Sharma replaced Kapoor as Divya (2023–2024)
- Purvi Pawar as Neha Tandon: Akshay, Mihika, Abhay and Divya's cousin (2023)
- Sparsh Kotwal as Abhay Tandon: Akshay, Mihika, Neha and Divya's cousin (2023)
- Vishal Solanki as Satinder: Prachi's rival colleague (2023)
- Pallavi Mahara as Damini: Aryan's suitress (2023)
- Sharika Ahluwalia as Laali: A poor, greedy woman who raised Panchi/Khushi (2023)
- Mohsin Khan as Balbira: Laali's boyfriend (2023)
- Ipsita Jena as Priya: Prachi's assistant (2023)
- Sanchita Ugale as Diya Tandon: Divya’s daughter; (2023–2025)
- Vishal Solanki as Jasbeer: Poorvi's one sided lover (2023–2025)
- Arjun Shekhawat as Ashutosh: Poorvi’s ex-fiancé (2023–2024)
- Imran Khan as Harman Malhotra: Harleen's husband; Rajvansh and Vikrant's father (2023–2025)
- Pyumori Mehta Ghosh as Harleen Malhotra: Rajvansh and Vikrant's mother; Harman's wife (2023–2025)
- Kirti Sualy as Rajvansh's grandmother (2023–2025)
- Susheel Parashar as Rajvansh's grandfather (2023–2025)
- Preet Kaur Nayak as Dipika Malhotra: Monisha's sister (2023–2025)
- Rahul Ram Manchanda as Vikrant Malhotra: Harleen and Harman's elder son (2023–2025)
- Priti Gandwani as Rajvansh's aunt (2023–2025)
- Anuj Khurana as Rajvansh's uncle (2023–2025)
- Nakul Ulja as Yug Malhotra: Rajvansh’s cousin; Diya’s love interest (2023–2025)
- Kavita Banerjee as Trishna Jaiswal: Krishna's wife (2024)
- Ajay Sharma as Gajendra Jaiswal; Trishna’s father (2024)
- Hetal Yadav as Rajni Jaiswal; Trishna's mother (2024)
- Hemant Choudhary as Amar Dayal; Jaiswal's political rival (2024)
- Srishti Jain as Monisha: Dipika's sister; (2024–2025)
- Bhawana Aneja as Roshni: Dushyant's wife; Dipika and Monisha's mother (2024–2025)
- Aakash Talwar as Armaan Randhawa: Khushi's husband (2024–2025)
- Parimal Bhattacharya as Kishan Parikh: Seema's husband (2025)
- Vandana Mittal as Seema Parikh: Kishan's wife (2025)
- Jaya Bhattacharya as Bua Maa (2025)
- Phalguni Sharma/Honeyy Soni as Gayatri Parikh: Kishan and Seema's daughter; Prarthana's adoptive sister (2025)
- Hina Dani as Baa: Kanti, Devang, Hitesh and Kinjal's mother (2025)
- Vijhay Badlaani as Kanti Zaveri: Devang, Hitesh and Kinjal's brother; Smita's husband; Raunak and Sneha's father (2025)
- Gurdip Punjj as Smita Zaveri: Kanti's wife; Raunak and Sneha's mother (2025)
- Isha Pandhe as Sneha Zaveri: Kanti and Smita's daughter; Raunak's sister (2025)
- Nitin Vakharia as Devang Zaveri: Kanti, Hitesh and Kinjal's brother (2025)
- Bhavwini Gandhi as Shubhvi Zaveri: Devang's wife; Tanuj, Sejal and Arjun's mother (2025)
- Abhay Bhadoriya as Tanuj Zaveri: Devang and Shubhvi's son; Sejal and Arjun's brother (2025)
- Hanisha Gehlot as Sejal Zaveri: Devang and Shubhvi's daughter; Tanuj and Arjun's sister (2025)
- Mohit Jaswani as Arjun Zaveri: Devang and Shubhvi's son; (2025)
- Parri Galaa as Kinjal Zaveri: Kanti, Hitesh and Devang's sister; Hitenkumar's wife; (2025)
- Kalpesh Patel as Hitenkumar: Kinjal's husband; Harsh and Kirtan's father (2025)
- Vedaant Saluja as Harsh: Kinjal and Hitenkumar's son (2025)
- Ahnaf F Khatri as Kirtan: Kinjal and Hitenkumar's son (2025)
- Unknown as Vihaan: Sneha's ex-fiance (2025)
- Aarchi Sachdeva as Payal Shah: Praful and Ketki's daughter; Raunak's suitor (2025)
- Rashika Matharu as Ketki Shah: Praful's wife; (2025)
- Nikhhil Raj Khera as Praful Shah: Ketki's husband (2025)
- MM Rishi as Bhavesh: Prarthana's suitor (2025)
- Rita Sharma Gupta as Daxa: Bhavesh's mother (2025)
- Aryan Raajput as Mayank: Raunak's friend (2025)
- Snehal Waghmare as Raunak's aunt (2025)
- Dawood Khann as Marcus: Prarthana's kidnappers' boss (2025)
- Hetal Puniwala as Raunak's uncle (2025)
- Shraddha Arya as Dr. Preeta Arora: Pragya, Bulbul and Srishti's sister (2025)
- Shakti Anand as Karan Luthra: Preeta's husband (2025)
- V S Prince Ratann as Yogi: Marcus' man (2025)
- Roopam Sharma as Sonalika Jaitley: Anisha's daughter (2025)
  - Megha Prasad replaced Sharma as Sonalika (2025)

== Production ==
=== Development ===
The series is a love story produced by Ekta Kapoor and Shobha Kapoor under the banner Balaji Telefilms that airs on Zee TV. Ekta Kapoor considers the letter K to be lucky and has named many of her productions starting with K.

Kapoor rejected 19 costumes while selecting the look of character Pragya.

=== Filming ===
The production and airing of the show was halted indefinitely in late March 2020 due to the COVID-19 outbreak in India. The outbreak caused the halt of filming of television shows and movies on 19 March 2020, and they were expected to resume on 1 April 2020. But shooting remained suspended and the remaining episodes were aired up to 24 March 2020. After three months, the production and filming of the series resumed on 29 June 2020 and airing resumed on 13 July 2020.

=== Casting ===
Shabbir Ahluwalia, who was also cast in Ekta's TV series Kayamath, was selected to portray the lead role of Abhishek Prem Mehra. Ahluwalia made his comeback after Zee twenty years. Actress Sriti Jha landed the lead role in the show. Mrunal Thakur was selected to portray the second leading role of Bulbul while Arjit Taneja was cast opposite her. In May 2014, Shikha Singh entered the show as the main antagonist Alia Mehra, while Madhurima Tuli was cast to portray the negative role of Tanu. Later, Tuli had to shoot for her film Baby so, this role was later played by Leena Jumani from September 2014. Actor Faisal Rashid was selected to portray the role of Suresh (Pragya's fiancé) who played an important role in April–May 2014, but in May 2015 he quit the series. Actress Supriya Shukla was cast to play the role of Sarla Arora, while Madhu Raja played the role of Daljeet Arora. Other supporting cast members include Samikssha Batnagar, Ankit Mohan, Charu Mehra and Amit Dhawan. Bhatnagar, who portrayed the supporting role of Mitali was replaced by Swati Anand within the month of launch while Anurag Sharma replaced Amit. In 2015, Neel Motawani (who was also cast in other shows of Ekta) was selected to play the negative role of Neel; while in June 2015 Nikhil Arya entered the series playing the role of main male antagonist Nikhil Sood.

In December 2015, Mrunal Thakur opted out from the show and was to be replaced by Kajol Shrivastava, however the character of Bulbul was phased out of the series after Mrunal's departure. In August 2016, Ankit Mohan quit the show so his character left as well. In September 2016, Arjit Taneja quit the show and was replaced by Vin Rana. In October 2016, Nikhil Arya was replaced by Rujut Dahiya. In July 2017, actress Ruchi Savarn entered the show as Purab's new love interest. Mishal Raheja as King Singh and Kaurwakee Vashista as Kiara Mehra entered the show after the leap. Actor Abeer Adil was cast in 2018 as King's cousin Tarun and Roma Bali as Tarun's mother.

In March 2019, a twenty-year leap was introduced with which several new characters entered in the show and became pivotal characters. In March 2019, Mugdha Chaphekar, Krishna Kaul and Naina Singh were introduced as leads of the second generation who play Prachi, Ranbir and Rhea respectively alongside Sriti and Shabbir. In August 2020, Naina left the show as she was not happy playing a negative role anymore and Pooja Banerjee replaced Singh as Rhea. In February 2022, Pooja Banerjee quit the show due to her pregnancy, and she was replaced by Tina Ann Philip. In February 2022, Jha and Ahluwalia officially quit the show after seven and half years as the story progressed on from their characters. They had last shot for the show in November 2021.

The show then took another generation leap of twenty years in November 2023, with Rachi Sharma and Abrar Qazi roped in as the new leads of generation three with Sharma portraying Prachi and Ranbir's younger daughter Poorvi Kohli while Qazi as Rajvansh Malhotra respectively.

Simran Budharup was roped in to play grown-up version of Prachi and Ranbir's elder daughter Khushi Kohli Randhawa replacing Trisha Rohatgi who played childhood version of same. Later Budhraup quit the show owing to less screenspace and was replaced by Jyotsna Chandola. Later, Chaphekar and Kaul who portrayed leads of generation two, their role roles came to an indefinite end in June 2024 and in September 2024 media confirmed the news that both are no longer part of the show. In an Interview from 2025, Chaphekar and Kaul said that they weren't aware that their shoot in June 2024 would be their last for show and that they were informed much later that their characters will not be brought back to the show causing the second generation story to end without any conclusion.

In February 2025, the show again took a 20-year generation leap, with Pranali Rathod and Akshay Bindra as new generation leads. However later Bindra's character was sidelined as Supporting character and Namik Paul stepped in as new male lead.

Abrar Qazi and Rachi Sharma and other supporting casts marked their exits due to the generation leap. In March 2025, Rachi Sharma was again roped in to reprise her role of Poorvi Malhotra as a cameo to revive dipping TRPs. She was again roped in for a second appearance in April 2025. Soon after it was also confirmed that Shraddha Arya and Shakti Anand would also be joining Kumkum Bhagya reprising their characters Karan and Preeta from Kundali Bhagya. However soon after their roles also ended and the show eventually went off air in September 2025 owing to low TRPs over a year.

== Spin-off ==
=== Kundali Bhagya ===
A spin-off series Kundali Bhagya premiered on 12 July 2017 and ran till 6 December 2024. The series narrated the story of Pragya's sisters, Preeta and Srishti and their attempt to find their mother Sarla and how they meet the rich and famous Luthra family. Later that show too took a generation leap and story shifted to Preeta's sons Rajveer and Shaurya.

=== Bhagya Lakshmi ===
A similar series Bhagya Lakshmi premiered on 3 August 2021 and ran till 29 June 2025. It traces the love story of Pragya's best friend, Lakshmi and Rishi. It stars Aishwarya Khare and Rohit Suchanti.

== Reception ==
=== Critical reception ===
Here's celebrating a show that has stood the test of time and crossed the boundaries of language, a big thank you to each and every one of you from all over the world for all the love you have given Kumkum Bhagya, for always keeping it at the top, no matter where it aired, and what language. We, as a team, are truly grateful that you let us entertain you for half a decade.

— Shabir Ahluwalia on the series completing 5 Years.

Reruns of Kumkum Bhagya premiered on Zee Anmol from 2017 and received high ratings in the BARC rural chart when Zee Anmol was FTA. It began running on the network again from episode 1 from 10 June 2020, due to the return to DD Free Dish.

The show also managed to strike a chord with West Africans too. Actor Kartik Aaryan also watched the show during the lockdown.

=== Ratings ===
Kumkum Bhagya premiered on 15 April 2014, climbed to Top 5 most-watched shows across all GECs, after only a few weeks of its launch. It was touted as the biggest fiction launch of 2014.

The show topped the TRP chart in week 43 of 2015 with 4.5 points, ahead of Saath Nibhaana Saathiya and Yeh Hai Mohabbatein. By week 11 of 2016, it had slipped to second with 3.8 points, behind Naagin.

Mid-2016 it recorded peak TRPs, led the chart in weeks 28 and 29, and by week 34 had held the top spot for six consecutive weeks. The following week ( Aug– Sep) it drew 12.6 million viewers, up from 12.2 million, still at number one. By week 37 it had topped the chart a seventh time, at 12,636 points. It fell out of the top five the week after. In week 27 of 2017, it got 12,209 impressions at first place. Throughout 2017, it recorded ratings of 2.7, 3.3, 3.4, 3.2 in weeks 35, 37, 38, 52 respectively.

In July 2020, the show occupied second position with 4.9 million impressions. By December 2020, it fell to fifth position with 5,409 impressions. By January 2021, it rose back to fifth with 6,288 impressions.

== Awards and nominations ==
| Year | Award | Category | Recipient | Result | Ref(s) |
|---|---|---|---|---|---|
| 2015 | Star Guild Awards | Best Upcoming Drama Series | Ekta Kapoor | Won | |
| 2015 | Gold Awards | Best Actress in Negative Role (Critics) | Shikha Singh | Won | |
| 2015 | Gold Awards | Best Actor in a Lead Role (Critics) | Shabbir Ahluwalia | Won | |
| 2015 | Gold Awards | Best Actress in a Lead Role (Popular) | Sriti Jha | Nominated | |
| 2015 | Gold Awards | Best Actor in a Lead Role (Popular) | Shabbir Ahluwalia | Nominated | |
| 2015 | Gold Awards | Best TV Show of the Year (Fiction) | Ekta Kapoor | Nominated | |
| 2015 | Indian Telly Awards | Best Onscreen Couple | Sriti Jha & Shabbir Ahluwalia | Won | |
| 2015 | Indian Telly Awards | Best Actress in a Lead Role | Sriti Jha | Won | |
| 2015 | BIG Star Entertainment Awards | BIG Star Most Entertaining Fiction Series | Ekta Kapoor | Won | |
| 2015 | BIG Star Entertainment Awards | BIG Star Most Entertaining Television Actor - Female | Sriti Jha | Nominated | |
| 2015 | BIG Star Entertainment Awards | BIG Star Most Entertaining Television Actor - Male | Shabbir Ahluwalia | Nominated | |
| 2016 | 9th Boroplus Gold Awards | Boroplus Face of the Year | Sriti Jha | Won | |
| 2016 | 9th Boroplus Gold Awards | Best Actor in a Lead Role (Popular) | Shabbir Ahluwalia | Won | |
| 2016 | 9th Boroplus Gold Awards | Best TV Show of the Year (Fiction) | Ekta Kapoor | Won | |
| 2016 | 9th Boroplus Gold Awards | Best Actress in Negative Role (Critics) | Shikha Singh | Nominated | |
| 2016 | 9th Boroplus Gold Awards | Best Actor in Supporting Role (Popular) | Arjit Taneja | Nominated | |
| 2016 | 9th Boroplus Gold Awards | Best Actress in a Lead Role (Popular) | Sriti Jha | Nominated | |
| 2016 | Indian Television Academy Awards | Best Actor (Popular) | Shabbir Ahluwalia | Won | |
| 2016 | Ghana Movie Awards | Best Foreign TV Series | Ekta Kapoor | Won | |
| 2017 | Gold Awards | Best TV Show of the Year (Fiction) | Ekta Kapoor | Won | |
| 2017 | Gold Awards | Best Onscreen Jodi | Sriti Jha & Shabbir Ahluwalia | Nominated | |
| 2017 | Gold Awards | Best Actress in Negative Role (Popular) | Shikha Singh | Nominated | |
| 2017 | Gold Awards | Best Actor in Supporting Role (Popular) | Arjit Taneja | Nominated | |
| 2017 | Gold Awards | Best Actress in a Lead Role (Popular) | Sriti Jha | Nominated | |
| 2017 | Gold Awards | Best Actor in a Lead Role (Popular) | Shabbir Ahluwalia | Nominated | |
| 2018 | 11th Keshking Gold Awards | Best Actress in Negative Role (Popular) | Shikha Singh | Won | |
| 2018 | 11th Keshking Gold Awards | Best Actor in a Lead Role (Popular) | Shabbir Ahluwalia | Won | |
| 2018 | 11th Keshking Gold Awards | Best Actress in a Lead Role (Popular) | Sriti Jha | Won | |
| 2018 | 11th Keshking Gold Awards | Gold Award for Fittest actor of Television | Vin Rana | Won | |
| 2018 | 11th Keshking Gold Awards | Best Television Show (Fiction) | Ekta Kapoor | Won | |
| 2018 | 11th Keshking Gold Awards | Gold Producer's Honour (For Completing 1000 Episodes) | Ekta Kapoor | Won | |
| 2018 | Telly Technical and Trade Awards | Best Editor (Fiction) | Vikas Sharma | Won | |
| 2019 | Indian Telly Awards | Best Daily Series | Ekta Kapoor | Won | |
| 2019 | Indian Telly Awards | Best Jodi | Shabbir Ahluwalia & Sriti Jha | Nominated | |
| 2019 | Indian Telly Awards | Best Actor in Lead Role (Male) | Shabbir Ahluwalia | Nominated | |
| 2019 | Indian Telly Awards | Best Actor in Lead Role (Female) | Sriti Jha | Nominated | |
| 2019 | Indian Telly Awards | Best Actor in Supporting Role (Male) | Mishal Raheja | Nominated | |
| 2019 | Indian Telly Awards | Best Actor in Negative Role (Male) | Shaad Randhawa | Nominated | |
| 2019 | Indian Telly Awards | Best Actor in Negative Role (Female) | Leena Jumani | Nominated | |
| 2019 | Gold Awards | Best Actress in a Supporting Role | Mugdha Chaphekar | Won | |
| 2019 | Gold Awards | Best Actor in a Supporting Role | Krishna Kaul | Nominated | |
| 2019 | Gold Awards | Best Actress in a Lead Role (Popular) | Sriti Jha | Nominated | |
| 2019 | Gold Awards | Best Actor in a Lead Role (Popular) | Shabbir Ahluwalia | Nominated | |
| 2019 | Gold Awards | Best Onscreen Jodi | Sriti Jha & Shabbir Ahluwalia | Nominated | |
| 2019 | Gold Awards | Best TV Show of the Year (Fiction) | Ekta Kapoor | Nominated | |
| 2019 | Gold Awards | Television Personality of the Year (Female) | Sriti Jha | Nominated | |
| 2019 | Gold Awards | Television Personality of the Year (Male) | Shabbir Ahluwalia | Nominated | |
| 2022 | Indian Television Academy Awards | Best Actor in Lead Role (Popular) | Shabir Ahluwalia | Nominated | |
| 2022 | Indian Television Academy Awards | Best Actress in Lead Role (Popular) | Sriti Jha | Nominated | |
| 2022 | Indian Television Academy Awards | Best Television Show - Fiction (Popular) | Ekta Kapoor | Nominated | |
