= Shikha Singh =

Indian television actress

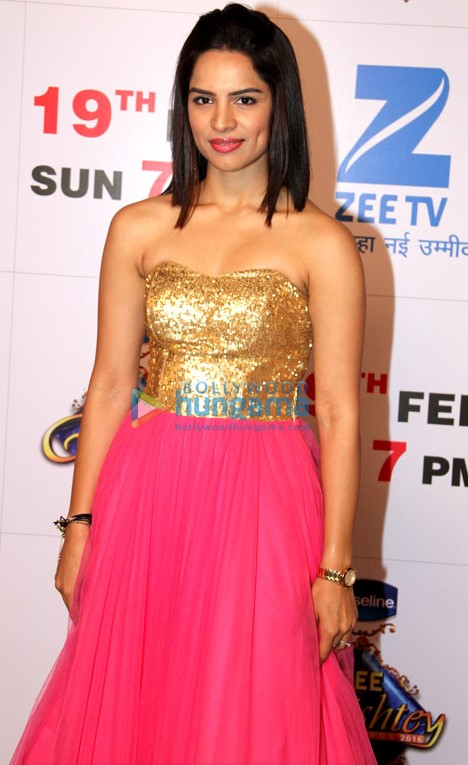
- Singh attending the function of Zee Rishtey Awards in 2018
- Born: 7 February 1986 (age 40)
- Other name: Shiha
- Occupation: Actress
- Years active: 2007–present
- Notable work: Kumkum Bhagya; Na Aana Is Des Laado; Mahabharata
- Spouse: Karan Shah (m. 2016)
- Children: 1

Shikha Singh Shah (born 7 February 1986) is an Indian actress notable for her work in Indian television industry.

== Career ==
=== Acting ===
Singh's acting debut was in Left Right Left as Cadet Aakriti Bhat. She was next seen in Zee TV's Meri Doli Tere Angana and Ghar Ki Lakshmi Betiyaan. and in 2010, she entered Colors TV's social drama Na Aana Is Des Laado as Amba Sangwan before her exit from it in 2011.

Singh collaborated with Colors TV third and consecutive time, for Phulwa. She began 2013 with Life OK's 26/12 in the character of Shahana Malik and next bagged Adaalat. It was followed playing Meghna Singhania in Sasural Simar Ka on Colors, and then she enacted brave girl warrior Shikhandi in epical TV series Mahabharat; both roles were from 2013 to 2014.

From 2014 to 2020, Singh portrayed the appreciative character Alia Mehra in Kumkum Bhagya; between this she was cast for the same role on its spin-off Kundali Bhagya, and also, she was cast in Chandra Nandini on Star Plus and &TV's popular episodic Laal Ishq as Vibha.

In 2022, she portrayed Riddhi Sharma in Colors TV's Naagin 6.

=== Other works ===
Apart from acting, Singh appeared as herself in Sony Entertainment Television's Jubilee Comedy Circus (2008). She anchored the channel exchanging series Gold Safe (2009–10). She was seen on Comedy Nights Bachao in 2015 & 2016.

== Personal life ==
Singh married Karan Shah in April 2016. They had a daughter in June 2020.

== Filmography ==
=== Television ===
Year	Title	Role
2007–2008	Left Right Left	Cadet Akriti Bhatt
2008	Jubilee Comedy Circus	Herself
2008	Meri Doli Tere Angana	Amrapali
2009	Ghar Ki Lakshmi Betiyann	Payal
2009–2010	Gold Safe	Anchor/Phone operator
2010	Aahat	Sneha
2010–2011	Na Aana Is Des Laado	Amba Sangwan
2011–2012	Phulwa	Gayatri
2013	2612	Shahana Malik
2013	Adaalat	Anjali Puri
2013–2014	Sasural Simar Ka	Meghna Singhania
2013–2014	Mahabharat	Shikhandini/Shikhandi
2014	Pavitra Rishta	Season finale special guest
2014–2020	Kumkum Bhagya	Alia Mehra Khanna
2015	Comedy Nights Bachao	Herself
2015–2016	Pyaar Ko Ho Jaane Do	Shabina Khan
2016	Box Cricket League	Herself (season 2)
2016	Comedy Nights Bachao	Herself
2016	Chandra Nandni	Princess
2017	Comedy Dangal	Herself
2017–2018	Kundali Bhagya	Alia Mehra
2018	Box Cricket League	Herself (season 3)
2019	Laal Ishq	Vibha
2019	Box Cricket League	Herself (season 4)
2022	Naagin 6	Inspector Riddhi Sharma
2025	Power of Paanch	Payal Chauhan
2025–present	Jagadhatri	Sakshi Mittal

=== Web series ===
Year	Title	Role	Ref.
2024	Kumkum Bhagya 2.0	Alia Mehra	
