= Pyaar Ko Ho Jaane Do =

Indian soap opera

- Title-card
- Genre: Drama; Romance; Thriller
- Created by: Ekta Kapoor
- Written by: Siddharth Kumar; Adhir Bhat; Nivedita Basu, Harneet Singh, Deepti Rawal; Ankush Nagpal
- Creative directors: Tanushree Dasgupta; Nimisha Pandey
- Starring: See below
- Theme music composer: lalit Sen
- Country of origin: India
- Original language: Hindi
- No. of seasons: 1
- No. of episodes: 73

Production
- Producers: Ekta Kapoor; Shobha Kapoor
- Production locations: Mumbai, India
- Editors: Vikas Sharma; Vishal Sharma
- Camera setup: Multi-camera
- Running time: Approx. 42 minutes
- Production company: Balaji Telefilms

Original release
- Network: Sony TV
- Release: 20 October 2015 – 29 January 2016

Pyaar Ko Ho Jaane Do (transl. Let Love Happen) is an Indian soap opera that premiered on 20 October 2015. It was aired Monday through Friday at 9 pm on Sony TV. The show stars Iqbal Khan and Mona Singh as the protagonists. The show is produced by Ekta Kapoor under her banner Balaji Telefilms. The show marks the comeback of various television actors. Due to low TRPs, the show aired its final episode on 29 January 2016.

== Plot ==
The show is the story of a very well-to-do, modern Punjabi family, the Hoodas. The backbone of this loving family is Ishaan (Mohammed Iqbal Khan) and his wife Preet (Mona Singh). Though Ishaan is Mr Hooda’s brother’s son, he (Mr Hooda) and his wife accepted Ishaan with open arms when the latter lost his entire family, including his wife, in a tragedy. Ishaan then went on to marry Preet, who too lost her family. Ishaan is the perfect son, the best brother, a doting father and an excellent friend. But underneath his perfect facade lies a terrible truth that Ishaan has been hiding from everyone, the truth about his real identity. Ishaan has constantly been in touch with a girl which led to the belief that he has an extra marital affair. The truth, however, is much further away from that. Ishaan, in fact, is a spy from a neighbouring country Pakistan, Rizwaan Ahmed Khan, who is brainwashed into thinking that his parents were killed by Indian agents.

The real Ishaan died, like the rest of his family, in the same tragedy. Given that Mr Hooda had not seen his brother or his family in years because of a clash the two had, there was no way they would have known what their nephew looked like. Using this to their advantage, the enemy IA sent their spy posing as Ishaan. Ishaan/Rizwan and Preet put up a facade of being a happy married couple while doting on the real Ishaan's daughter Kavya (who survived the tragedy). Ishaan and Preet are gradually drawn to each other during the four years of their marriage. Rizwan aka Ishaan tries to fight his attraction to Preet but eventually consummates his marriage with her. By the time Preet discovers Rizwan's truth, she realizes she is pregnant with his child. Eventually, she takes the help of a RAW agent called Shergill to try to stop Rizwan. On 26 January, before Rizwan can complete his mission, Preet tells him Baba's truth with the help of Sana. They hug each other and die in the bomb blast. Later a grown up Kavya writes a book named A Tale of Two Countries which was based on the story of Riwzan-Preet.

== Cast ==
- Mohammed Iqbal Khan as Rizwan Ahmed Khan/Ishaan Hooda
- Mona Singh as Preet Ishaan Hooda (née Singh)/Preet Rizwan Khan
- Micky Makhija as Amardeep Hooda
- Jyothi D Tommaar as Alka Hooda
- Mansi Sharma as Trisha Hooda
- Pushtiie Shakti as Neeti Khurana (née Hooda)
- Lavin Gothi as Siddharth "Sid" Hooda
- Melanie Pais as Sana (antagonist/later turned protagonist)
- Mohit Abrol as Atif
- Parag Tyagi as Kiku Khurana
- Arjit Taneja as Bilal Khan
- Hayat Asif as Baba (main antagonist)
- Arun Bali as Ustad Rehmat Ali Khan
- Shikha Singh as Shabina Khan
- Aryan Bhatia as Tinku Khurana
- Mahesh Shetty as Raw Agent Jai Shergill
- Amit Dolawat as Vikrant
- Shiny Dixit as Naina

== Awards ==
Year	Event	Category	Recipient	Result	Citation
2016	Garv Television Honours	Best Concept	Ekta Kapoor	Won	
2016	Garv Television Honours	Best Story	Ekta Kapoor & Sonali Jaffer	Won	
2016	Garv Television Honours	Best Direction	Muzammil Desai & Gautam Sobti	Won	
2016	Garv Television Honours	Best Actor - Jury	Mohammed Iqbal Khan	Won	
2016	Garv Television Honours	Rocking Comeback - Jury	Mohammed Iqbal Khan	Won	
2016	Garv Television Honours	Face of the Year - Male (Jury)	Mohammed Iqbal Khan	Won	
2016	Garv Television Honours	Best Actress - Jury	Mona Singh	Won	
2016	Garv Television Honours	Face of the Year - Female (Jury)	Mona Singh	Won	
2016	Garv Television Honours	Best Actress in Comic Role - Jury	Pushti Seth	Won	
2016	Garv Television Honours	Best New Drama Series - Jury	Ekta Kapoor	Won	
2016	Garv Television Honours	Best Drama Series - Jury	Ekta Kapoor	Won	
2016	Garv Television Honours	Best New Serial - Popular	Ekta Kapoor	Won	
