= Gold Award for Best Television Show (Fiction) =

- Awarded for: Best Fiction Show of the Year on Television
- Country: India
- Presented by: Gold Awards
- First award: 2007
- Recent Winner: Kundali Bhagya and Yeh Rishta Kya Kehlata Hai

Highlights
- Total Awarded: 12
- Most Wins: Ekta Kapoor for Kumkum Bhagya (3)
- Last Winner: Ekta Kapoor for Kundali Bhagya (2019)
- Website: Gold Awards

Gold Award for Best Television Show (Fiction) is an award given as part of its annual Gold Awards for Indian television, to recognize the most popular fiction show of the year.

The award was first awarded in 2007 under the title Best Fiction Show of the Year.

== List of winners ==
=== 2000s ===
- 2007 Saat Phere: Saloni Ka Safar - Sphere Origins - Sujoy Wadhwa
  - Kasamh Se – Balaji Telefilms – Ekta Kapoor and Shobha Kapoor
  - Left Right Left – DJ's a Creative Unit – Tony Singh and Deeya Singh
  - Viraasat – Chopra Films – B. R. Chopra and Ravi Chopra
  - Banoo Main Teri Dulhann - Shakuntalam Telefilms - Shyamashis Bhattacharya and Neelima Bajpaie
  - Virrudh - Applause Entertainment and Ugraya Entertainment - Smriti Zubin Irani
- 2008 Sapna Babul Ka...Bidaai - Director Kut's Productions - Rajan Shahi
  - Banoo Main Teri Dulhann - Shakuntalam Telefilms - Shyamashis Bhattacharya and Neelima Bajpaie
  - Kasamh Se – Balaji Telefilms – Ekta Kapoor and Shobha Kapoor
  - Kayamath – Balaji Telefilms – Ekta Kapoor and Shobha Kapoor
  - Kis Desh Mein Hai Meraa Dil – Balaji Telefilms – Ekta Kapoor and Shobha Kapoor
  - Dill Mill Gayye - Cinevistaas Limited - Prem Krishen Malhotra and Sunil Malhotra

=== 2010s ===
- 2010 Yeh Rishta Kya Kehlata Hai - Director Kut's Productions - Rajan Shahi
  - Sapna Babul Ka...Bidaai - Director Kut's Productions - Rajan Shahi
  - Pavitra Rishta – Balaji Telefilms – Ekta Kapoor and Shobha Kapoor
  - Bandini – Balaji Telefilms – Ekta Kapoor and Shobha Kapoor
  - Uttaran – Film Farm India – Pintoo Guha and Rupali Guha
  - Mann Kee Awaaz Pratigya - Walkwater Media - Pearl Grey
  - Balika Vadhu - Sphere Origins - Sujoy Wadhwa
- 2011 Pavitra Rishta – Balaji Telefilms – Ekta Kapoor and Shobha Kapoor
  - Yahan Main Ghar Ghar Kheli – Rajshri Productions – Sooraj Barjatya
  - Uttaran – Film Farm India – Pintoo Guha and Rupali Guha
  - Mann Kee Awaaz Pratigya - Walkwater Media - Pearl Grey
  - Yeh Rishta Kya Kehlata Hai - Director Kut's Productions - Rajan Shahi
  - Balika Vadhu - Sphere Origins - Sujoy Wadhwa
- 2012 Diya Aur Baati Hum – Shashi Sumeet Productions - Sumeet Mittal and Shashi Mittal
  - Pavitra Rishta – Balaji Telefilms – Ekta Kapoor and Shobha Kapoor
  - Bade Achhe Lagte Hain – Balaji Telefilms – Ekta Kapoor and Shobha Kapoor
  - Parichay - Nayee Zindagi Kay Sapno Ka – Balaji Telefilms – Ekta Kapoor and Shobha Kapoor
  - Yeh Rishta Kya Kehlata Hai - Director Kut's Productions - Rajan Shahi
- 2013 Qubool Hai – 4 Lions Films – Gul Khan
  - Saraswatichandra - SLB Productions - Sanjay Leela Bhansali
  - Diya Aur Baati Hum – Shashi Sumeet Productions - Sumeet Mittal and Shashi Mittal
  - Bade Achhe Lagte Hain – Balaji Telefilms – Ekta Kapoor and Shobha Kapoor
  - Parichay - Nayee Zindagi Kay Sapno Ka – Balaji Telefilms – Ekta Kapoor and Shobha Kapoor
  - Pyaar Ka Dard Hai Meetha Meetha Pyaara Pyaara - Rajshri Productions - Kavita K. Barjatya
- 2014 Diya Aur Baati Hum - Shashi Sumeet Productions - Sumeet Mittal and Shashi Mittal
  - Ye Hai Mohabbatein – Balaji Telefilms – Ekta Kapoor and Shobha Kapoor
  - Devon Ke Dev...Mahadev - Triangle Film Company - Nikhil Sinha
  - Mahabharat - Swastik Productions - Siddharth Kumar Tiwari
  - Rangrasiya - Tequila Shots Productions - Saurabh Tiwari
- 2015 Saath Nibhaana Saathiya - Rashmi Sharma Telefilms - Rashmi Sharma
  - Kumkum Bhagya – Balaji Telefilms – Ekta Kapoor and Shobha Kapoor
  - Sasural Simar Ka – Rashmi Sharma Telefilms - Rashmi Sharma
  - Yeh Hai Mohabbatein – Balaji Telefilms - Ekta Kapoor and Shobha Kapoor
  - Udaan Sapno Ki – Gurudev Bhalla Productions - Mahesh Bhatt
  - Diya Aur Baati Hum – Shashi Sumeet Productions - Sumeet Mittal and Shashi Mittal
- 2016 Kumkum Bhagya – Balaji Telefilms – Ekta Kapoor and Shobha Kapoor
  - Ye Hai Mohabbatein – Balaji Telefilms – Ekta Kapoor and Shobha Kapoor
  - Sasural Simar Ka – Rashmi Sharma Telefilms - Rashmi Sharma
  - Jamai Raja – Grazing Goat Pictures - Ashvini Yardi and Akshay Kumar
  - Diya Aur Baati Hum – Shashi Sumeet Productions - Sumeet Mittal and Shashi Mittal
- 2017 Kumkum Bhagya – Balaji Telefilms – Ekta Kapoor and Shobha Kapoor
  - Ye Hai Mohabbatein – Balaji Telefilms – Ekta Kapoor and Shobha Kapoor
  - Kasam Tere Pyaar Ki – Balaji Telefilms – Ekta Kapoor and Shobha Kapoor
  - Shakti - Astitva Ke Ehsaas Ki – Rashmi Sharma Telefilms – Rashmi Sharma
  - Ishqbaaz – 4 Lions Films – Gul Khan
- 2018 Kumkum Bhagya – Balaji Telefilms – Ekta Kapoor and Shobha Kapoor
  - Kundali Bhagya – Balaji Telefilms – Ekta Kapoor and Shobha Kapoor
  - Bepannah – Cinevistaas Limited – Prem Krishen Malhotra
  - Shakti - Astitva Ke Ehsaas Ki – Rashmi Sharma Telefilms – Rashmi Sharma
  - Kullfi Kumarr Bajewala – 4 Lions Films – Gul Khan
  - Ishq Subhan Allah – Creative Eye Limited – Dheeraj Kumar
- 2019 Kundali Bhagya – Balaji Telefilms – Ekta Kapoor and Shobha Kapoor (tied with) Yeh Rishta Kya Kehlata Hai - Director's Kut Productions - Rajan Shahi
  - Kumkum Bhagya – Balaji Telefilms – Ekta Kapoor and Shobha Kapoor
  - Kasautii Zindagii Kay – Balaji Telefilms – Ekta Kapoor and Shobha Kapoor
  - Shakti - Astitva Ke Ehsaas Ki – Rashmi Sharma Telefilms – Rashmi Sharma
  - Kullfi Kumarr Bajewala – 4 Lions Films – Gul Khan
  - Yeh Rishtey Hain Pyaar Ke - Director Kut's Productions - Rajan Shahi
