= Sairaab =

Indian musical romantic television series

- Genre: Musical; Romance
- Created by: Leena Gangopadhyay
- Developed by: Shruti Naidu
- Directed by: Yogesh Bhati; Chirag Madhuram Singh
- Creative director: Garima Dimri
- Starring: Krishna Kaul; Madirakshi Mundle
- Theme music composer: Debojyoti Mishra
- Opening theme: "Sairaab Hua" by Prantik Sur and Sonakshi Kar
- Country of origin: India
- Original language: Hindi
- No. of seasons: 1
- No. of episodes: 113

Production
- Executive producers: Nitin Solanki; Sanket Vanzara; Rahul Gyaan Singh
- Producers: Leena Gangopadhyay; Saibal Bannerjee
- Editors: Sameer; Soumen
- Camera setup: Multi-camera
- Running time: 20 minutes
- Production company: Magic Moments Motion Pictures

Original release
- Network: StarPlus
- Release: 2 June – 22 September 2026

Related
- Yeh Hai Chahatein; Manasella Neene

Sairaab is an Indian Hindi-language romantic musical television drama series that aired on StarPlus from 2 June to 22 September 2026 and streams digitally on JioHotstar. Produced by Leena Gangopadhyay and Saibal Banerjee under Magic Moments Motion Pictures, the series stars Madirakshi Mundle and Krishna Kaul (who replaced Rohit Chandel). It is an official remake of Star Suvarna's Kannada series Manasella Neene, which itself is a remake of Ekta Kapoor's Yeh Hai Chahatein.

== Plot ==
The story follows Dr. Nayanika Roy, a single working mother and Ishaan Ganguly, a celebrity rockstar, as they navigate the challenges of love, family and relationships.

== Cast ==
=== Main ===
- Madirakshi Mundle as Dr. Nayanika Roy Ganguly: ENT specialist; Anirban and Mrs. Roy's daughter; Joydeep's sister; Indraneel's ex-wife; Ishaan's wife; Ujjaini and Rayan's mother (2026)
  - Hansika Jangid as child Nayanika (2026)
- Rohit Chandel / Krishna Kaul as Ishaan Ganguly: Lead Vocalist of the band "Sairaab"; Maria and Vishwanath's son; D'souza's step-son; Nayanika's husband; Ujjaini's step-father; Rayan's father; Ujjaini, Rohan, Romeo, Minni and Gablu's idol (2026)
  - Abaan Khan as child Ishaan (2026)

=== Recurring ===
- Sagar Saini as Adinath Basu: Indrani's husband; Indraneel, Rudraneel, and Akashneel's father; Ujjaini, Rohan, Romeo, and Minni's grandfather (2026)
- Kishori Shahane as Indrani Basu: Adinath's wife; Indraneel, Rudraneel, and Akashneel's mother; Ujjaini, Rohan, Romeo, and Minni's grandmother (2026)
- Sachin Verma as Dr. Indraneel Basu: Adinath and Indrani's eldest son; Rudraneel and Akashneel's brother; Nayanika's ex-husband; Angana's husband; Ujjaini and Rohan's father (2026)
- Neha Kaul as Dr. Angana Basu: Indraneel's wife; Rohan's mother; Ujjaini's step-mother (2026)
- Tina Kashyap as Ujjaini "Tinni" Basu: Indraneel and Nayanika's daughter; Ishaan and Angana's step-daughter; Rohan and Rayan's half-sister; Shirsho's love interest; Ishaan's fan (2026)
  - Aadya Agarwal as child Ujjaini (2026)
  - Kaisha Sadh as baby Ujjaini (2026)
- Mohit Jaswani as Rohan Basu: Indraneel and Angana's son; Ujjaini's half-brother; Ishaan's fan; Nayanika's well-wisher (2026)
- Raj Logani as Rudraneel Basu: Adinath and Indrani's second son; Indraneel and Akashneel's brother; Rusha's husband; Romeo's father (2026)
- Ruchi Savarn as Rusha Basu: Rudraneel's wife; Romeo's mother (2026)
- Anish Railkar as Romeo Basu: Rudraneel and Rusha's son; Ishaan's fan; Nayanika's well-wisher (2026)
- Shantanu Monga as Akashneel Basu: Adinath and Indrani's youngest son; Indraneel and Rudraneel's brother; Shreya's husband; Minni's father (2026)
- Patrali Chattopadhyay as Shreya Basu: Akashneel's wife; Minni's mother (2026)
- Chanchal Choudhary as Minni Basu: Akashneel and Shreya's daughter; Ishaan's fan; Nayanika's well-wisher (2026)
- Ajay Chakraborty as Dibanath Basu: Adinath's brother; Jaya's husband (2026)
- Vijaylakshmi Singh as Jaya "Choti Kaki" Basu: Dibanath's wife (2026)
- Raakesh Maudgal as Anirban Roy: Mrs. Roy's husband; Nayanika and Joydeep's father; Ujjaini, Gablu and Rayan's grandfather (2026)
- Shoma Akarshan as Mrs. Roy: Anirban's wife; Nayanika and Joydeep's mother; Ujjaini, Gablu and Rayan's grandmother (2026)
- Vivek Singh as Joydeep Roy: Anirban and Mrs. Roy's son; Nayanika's brother; Malini's husband; Gablu's father (2026)
- Deepika Upadhyay as Malini Roy: Anirban's wife; Gablu's mother (2026)
- Avtar Vaishnavi as Gablu Roy: Joydeep and Malini's son; Ishaan's fan (2026)
- Pawan Mahendru as Vishwanath Sen a.k.a Bhishu Dada: Maria's husband; Ishaan's father; Rayan's grandfather; Ujjaini's step-grandfather (2026)
- Prakriti Nautiyal as Maria: D'Souza's ex-wife; Vishwanath's wife; Ishaan's mother; Rayan's grandmother; Ujjaini's step-grandmother (2026)
- Viplove Sharma as Shirsho: Ujjaini's friend and love interest (2026)
- Jatin Raina as Krish: Ishaan's Manager and close friend (2026)
- Prity Sahani as Jessica: Ishaan's friend (2026)
- Bhoomika Sawant as Diya Ghosh: Ujjaini's friend (2026)
- Swara Sahamate as Rose: Ujjaini's friend (2026)
- Om as Ankush: Ujjaini's friend (2026)
- Shraddha Surve as Ina: Ishaan's obsessive lover (2026)

=== Guest appearances ===
- Neha Harsora as Sailee Jadhav from Udne Ki Aasha (2026)
- Kanwar Dhillon as Sachin Deshmukh from Udne Ki Aasha (2026)
- Tanvi Shewale as Roshni Deshmukh from Udne Ki Aasha (2026)
- Puru Chibber as Tejas Deshmukh from Udne Ki Aasha (2026)
- Rohit Suchanti as Angad Virani from Kyunki Rishton Ke Bhi Roop Badalte Hain (2026)
- Tanisha Mehta as Vrinda Gokhale from Kyunki Rishton Ke Bhi Roop Badalte Hain (2026)
- Nishigandha Wad as Sudha Bhardwaj from Oh Humnava Tum Dena Saath Mera (2026)

== Production ==
=== Casting ===
Madirakshi Mundle and Rohit Chandel were selected to play Noyonika and Ishaan. The couple were introduced in an extravaganza gala–Fashion Ka Rang, Rishton Ka Sang. Kishore Shahane was signed to play Indrani Basu. Neha Kaul entered the show as Dr. Angana. Mohit Jaswani was cast as Rohan Basu. In July 2026, Actors Sagar Parekh, Avinash Mishra, and Aashay Mishra were approached for the role of Ishaan but Krishna Kaul was finalized to replace Rohit Chandel due to Chandel's POCSO Case.

=== Release ===
In May 2026, the first promo of the series was introduced an AI version. A second promo was released after one week with Madirakshi Mundle and Rohit Chandel. Sairaab premiered on 2 June 2026, replacing Advocate Anjali Awasthi in its 7.30 p.m. slot. It was replaced by Sayoneee in its timeslot.

The production of the series wrapped up on 12 September. Due to low digital viewership, the series went off air on 22 September 2026.

== Reception ==
In its opening week, the show recorded 0.7 TRP in week 23 of 2026 and had a household reach of 1.4 TVR. The next week, it clocked at a rating of 0.8 TRP. The on-screen pairing of Mundle and Chandel was appreciated by viewers.

== Soundtrack ==
"Sairaab Hua" was released on 18 June 2026 and was composed by Debojyoti Mishra and it was followed by other songs.

No.	Title	Lyrics	Music	Singer(s)	Length
1.	"Sairaab Hua"	Debojyoti Mishra	Debojyoti Mishra	Prantik Sur & Sonakshi Kaur	3:19
2.	"Tu Koi Aur Hai"	Raajeev V Bhalla	Raajeev V Bhalla	Prantik Sur & Rajeev Bhalla	1:37
3.	"Intezaar Tha"	Soham Majumdar	Debojyoti Mishra	Prantik Sur	2:40
4.	"Tum Aaoge"	Soham Majumdar	Debojyoti Mishra	Prantik Sur	2:15
Total length:					9:51
