= Kyunki Saas Bhi Kabhi Bahu Thi 2 =

Indian drama television series

- Genre: Soap opera
- Created by: Ekta Kapoor
- Developed by: Ekta Kapoor
- Written by: Dialogue: Dheeraj Sarna
- Screenplay by: Rajesh Joshi; Anantica Sahir; Pallavi Lumba
- Directed by: Muzammil Desai; Khwaja Mughal; Naeem Siddiqui; Shubh Jaiswal; Vikas Tompe; Jitendra Maurya; Adarsh Swaroop; Ashish Gupta
- Creative directors: Siddharth Vankar; Aakansha Shukla; Noaman Khan
- Starring: See below
- Opening theme: Kyunki Saas Bhi Kabhi Bahu Thi by Priya Bhattacharya
- Composer: Binod Ghimire
- Country of origin: India
- Original language: Hindi
- No. of episodes: 449

Production
- Executive producers: Varun Babbar; Tarun Mishra; Chetan Avchar; Yaseen Shaikh
- Producers: Ekta Kapoor; Shobha Kapoor
- Cinematography: Deepak Malwankar
- Editors: Vikas Sharma; Vishal Sharma; Sandeep N. Bhatt
- Camera setup: Multi-camera
- Running time: 22–30 minutes 59 minutes (for season finale)
- Production company: Balaji Telefilms

Original release
- Network: Star Plus
- Release: 29 July 2025 – 20 October 2026

Related
- Kyunki Saas Bhi Kabhi Bahu Thi; Kyunki Rishton Ke Bhi Roop Badalte Hain

Kyunki Saas Bhi Kabhi Bahu Thi 2 (transl. Because Even a Mother-in-Law Was a Daughter-in-Law Once 2) is an Indian Hindi-language television series premiered on 29 July 2025 on StarPlus and streams digitally on JioHotstar. Produced by Ekta Kapoor and Shobha Kapoor under Balaji Telefilms Limited, it is a sequel and reboot of Kyunki Saas Bhi Kabhi Bahu Thi. Smriti Irani and Amar Upadhyay returned to portray the leads, Tulsi and Mihir Virani. The series concluded on 20 October 2026.

== Plot ==
Twenty-five years later, Tulsi and Mihir celebrate their 38th anniversary with their children Gautam, Shobha and Karan visiting from abroad. Tulsi also raises her late cousin Kesar and Anupam’s children—Angad, Paridhi and Hrithik. Mihir’s aunts Daksha and Gayatri remain fixtures in the family, with Daksha who still love's gossiping about films and Gayatri questioning Hemant’s place in the household.

Paridhi’s relationship with Ranvijay causes trouble when Angad is wrongly arrested for a hit-and-run. Witness Vrinda proves his innocence, while the real culprit, Viren Mehta, is arrested. Mihir’s NRI college friend Noina Sarabhai helps Paridhi marry Ajay after Ranvijay abandons her, but secretly loves Mihir. Paridhi exploits Noina’s feelings to separate Tulsi and Mihir. Ranvijay returns, and Paridhi falsely accuses Ajay’s family of domestic violence, but Tulsi testifies for them. Mitali falls for Angad, while Vrinda is engaged to Ranvijay’s abusive friend Suhas. Angad and Vrinda expose Mitali and Suhas, breaking both alliances. After Mitali blackmails Angad, they elope and are banished from Shanti Niketan.

Noina stages a suicide attempt and manipulates Mihir into spending a night with her. As Kiran pushes Mihir towards divorce, he transfers his property to Tulsi. Meanwhile, maid Manjuri, posing as “Munmun,” falls for Hrithik; Tulsi discovers the truth, sends her to a hostel and sponsors her education. After learning about Mihir and Noina and failing to stop Paridhi and Ranvijay’s marriage, Tulsi leaves Shanti Niketan for Amba’s ancestral home in Anjar.

Tulsi has established the Bandhej handloom cooperative with poor girls, including designer Vaishnavi. Noina controls Shanti Niketan, while Mihir still longs for Tulsi but keeps Noina at a distance. Paridhi suffers Ranvijay’s abuse, Hrithik remains in an unhappy marriage with Mitali, and Angad and Vrinda live happily with Akshay and Madhavi. Manjuri is now Mumbai’s District Collector. Tulsi returns to Mumbai for an exhibition, reunites with Angad and Vrinda and encounters the Viranis. Dev develops feelings for Vaishnavi, while Mihir pretends to love Noina so Tulsi can move on.

After Tulsi saves Hrithik from suicide, Gayatri apologizes to her. Tulsi discovers the Viranis’ financial crisis and that Shanti Niketan is mortgaged to Prataprai Dhangiri. She also uncovers Ranvijay’s plan to seize Virani Industries through Angad’s shares. At Prataprai’s great-grandson’s wedding, Gayatri asks Tulsi to pretend she and Mihir are still together to gain time to repay the loan. Tulsi agrees for her children and Shanti Niketan, exposes Ranvijay’s betrayal, and the events eventually lead to Dev marrying Prataprai’s granddaughter Saloni.

Tulsi tells the divorce counsellor she wants to end her marriage, but a video proves Mihir and Noina were never intimate. Mitali abducts Timsi, leading to a custody battle that Hrithik wins. Gautam takes responsibility for Damini’s accident to protect Nakul. Noina falsely claims to have cancer and asks Mihir to marry her. Tulsi brings her home and fulfils her supposed final wishes, but discovers the deception before the wedding and throws her out. Tulsi and Mihir reconcile and remarry, but Mihir leaves for America after a factory fire.

Paridhi accidentally kills Ranvijay and is supported by Ajay. With Aryan’s help, they remarry and eventually move to the US with Sunny and Garima. Meanwhile, Rio, Ansh and Niyati’s son, enters the family and discovers that Ansh was never on the plane believed to have crashed. Niyati regains her memory, while Rio and Parth clash over the family business.

Parth secretly tries to sell Shanti Niketan. When Vaishnavi discovers the deal, he pushes her off a cliff and frames Rio. Rio confronts Parth, who shoots him dead. Nandini discovers Parth’s crime and kills him. Tulsi takes responsibility to protect Nandini and is imprisoned for ten years.

After her release, Tulsi returns to a fractured Shanti Niketan. Karan rejects her and blames her for Parth’s death, while Gautam remains hostile. Tulsi learns Mihir never returned, reclaims Shanti Niketan, and removes the partition in the house. She supports Vaishnavi against Karan and Gautam, and Nakul marries Vaishnavi. During the wedding, Karan’s business partner Subhash Dasgupta arrives with his wife Tripti, who is also the ex-wife of Sahil. Tripti uses her son Sid’s affair with Samaira to manipulate the Viranis into accepting their marriage.

Tripti reveals she knew the truth about Parth’s death because she was the buyer to whom he was selling Amba Bhawan. Tulsi learns that Tripti murdered Aparna, Subhash's wife, through her driver Shankar, who is also killed by Tripti. Manjuri and Hrithik visit Shanti Niketan, where Manjuri encounters Tripti and feels an inexplicable familiarity. Tulsi unmasks Anupam Kapadia as the hooded infiltrator and searches for Mandira, unaware she lives in the US with Amar Sanghvi—actually Mihir, whose memory has been erased. As he gets flashes of his past, Mandira suppress them through injections. Anupam wants Mihir and Tulsi to unite and as cracks emerge between him and Mandira, he questions, but is blackmailed by her over saving his life.

Nandini confesses killing Parth, shattering Karan and making him regret his decade-long hatred of Tulsi. He reconciles with Tulsi who counsels him on Parth's death. Overhearing them, Samaira learns of Tripti's role in Aparna's murder and tells Sid, who begins investigating, alarming Tripti. With Mandira away, Anupam sends Mihir to Mumbai for treatment. No longer hiding, he meets Shobha in the US and reveals Mandira’s role in Mihir’s memory loss. They head to Mumbai, while Mandira, realising she has been outmanoeuvred, follows.

Mihir evicts the Viranis from Shantiniketan alongside Mandira while secretly plotting with Tulsi to defeat her after regaining his memory. With Munni as a witness, Sid gathers evidence exposing Tripti and Mandira’s crimes, while Tripti gets Nandini arrested for Parth’s murder. At Mihir’s invitation, Tripti and Tulsi arrive at Shantiniketan with their families, where Mihir exposes Tripti and then Mandira. Desperate, Mandira attempts to shoot Mihir but is fatally shot by Anupam. Tripti and Anupam are taken into custody, and Nandini returns home after all charges against her are dropped. As Sid and Samaira prepare to marry and Vaishnavi is pregnant, the Viranis celebrate Diwali. In the final scene, Savita appears and blesses Mihir and Tulsi, as they reminisce about their past and cherish their reunited family.

== Cast ==
=== Main ===
- Smriti Irani as Tulsi Virani: Owner of Bandhej Co-operative Industries; Matriarch of the Viranis (2025–2026)
- Amar Upadhyay as Mihir Virani: Owner of Govardhan Virani group of Industries; Patriarch of the Viranis (2025–2026)

=== Recurring ===
- Achint Kaur as Dr. Mandira 'Mandy' Kapadia: Anupam's elder sister; Mihir's obsessive lover; Karan's mother (2026)
- Aman Verma as Anupam Kapadia: Mandira's younger brother; Kesar's husband; Angad, Paridhi and Hrithik's father (2026)
- Sumeet Sachdev as Advocate Gautam "Gomzi" Virani: Tulsi and Mihir's elder son; Ganga and Teesha's ex-husband; Mayank and Nakul's father (2026)
- Ravee Gupta as Damini Khanna Virani: Gautam's third wife; Karan's ex-fiancee; Mayank and Nakul's mother (2026)
- Daksh Sharma as Nakul Virani: Gautam and Damini's son; Mayank's twin brother; Vaishnavi's second husband (2026)
- Swati Sharma as Vaishnavi Virani: Tulsi's trusted aide in her business; Parth's widow; Nakul's wife (2025–2026)
- Ritu Chaudhary as Shobha Virani Choudhary: Tulsi and Mihir's daughter; Vishal's widow; Abhishek's wife (2025–2026)
- Hiten Tejwani as Karan Virani: Mandira and Mihir's son; Nandini's second husband; Parth, Samaira and Raunak's's father (2025–2026)
- Gauri Pradhan as Nandini Thakkar Virani: Ansh and Aseem's ex-wife; Karan's wife; Parth, Samaira and Raunak's mother (2025–2026)
- Sohil Singh Jhuti as Parth Virani: Karan and Nandini's elder son; Vaishnavi's late husband; Tripti's partner in crime (2025–2026)
  - Nidhiksh Jadav as child Parth Virani (2026) (analepsis appearance)
- Aanchal Soni as Samaira Virani: Karan and Nandini's daughter; Siddharth's fiance (2026)
  - Jia Narigara as teenage Samaira Virani (2025–2026)
- Azhar J Malik / Abrar Ali as Raunak Virani: Karan and Nandini's younger son; Parth and Samaira's younger brother (2026) / (2026)
  - Samar Birje as child Raunak Virani (2025)
- Akashdeep Saigal as:
  - Riyansh "Rio" Virani: Ansh and Niyati's illegitimate son; Karan's adopted son; Vaishnavi's ex-fiancee (2026)
  - Ansh Gujral: Tulsi and Mihir's younger son; Niyati's ex-boyfriend; Shraddha and Nandini's late husband (2026) (analepsis appearance)
- Parakh Madan as Niyati Oberoi Virani: Ansh's ex-girlfriend; Karan's fake wife; Riyansh's mother (2026)
- Jiten Lalwani as Kiran Virani: Savita and Mansukh's younger son; Aarti and Mandira's ex–husband; Karishma's father (2025)
- Rohit Suchanti as Angad Virani: Anupam and Kesar's elder son, Vrinda's husband; Akshay and Madhavi's father (2025–2026)
- Tanisha Mehta as Vrinda Gokhale Virani: Malti and Parameshwar's daughter; Angad's wife; Akshay and Madhavi's mother (2025–2026)
- Ansh Saini as Akshay Virani: Angad and Vrinda's son; Madhavi's twin brother(2025–2026)
- Swara Kadam as Madhavi Virani: Angad and Vrinda's daughter; Akshay's twin sister (2025–2026)
- Shagun Sharma as Paridhi "Pari" Virani Parekh: Anupam and Kesar's daughter; Ajay's wife; Garima's mother; Sunny's stepmother (2025–2026)
  - Adhira Chavan as child Paridhi (2025)
- Nirvaan Anand as Ajay Parekh: Indira and Naveen's son; Paridhi's husband; Sunny's father; Garima's stepfather (2025–2026)
- Summit Jaiswal / Tanish Mahendru as Ranvijay "Ran" Singh: Shalini and Paridhi's ex-husband; Garima's father (2025) / (2025–2026)
- Drashti Bhanushali as Garima "Garu" Parekh: Paridhi and Ranvijay's daughter; Sunny's half sister (2026)
  - Kanak Arora as child Garima (2025–2026)
- Abhiman as Sunny Parekh: Ajay and Anandi's son; Paridhi's stepson; Garima's half brother (2026)
- Aman Gandhi / Shubh Karaan Bhopal as Hrithik Virani: Anupam and Kesar's younger son; Manjuri's husband; Mitali's ex-husband; Timsy's father (2025–2026) / (2026)
- Aditi Sanwal as Mitali "Mits" Sarabhai; Suchitra's daughter; Noina's niece; Hrithik's ex-wife; Timsy's mother (2025–2026)
- Prachi Singh as DM Manjuri "Munni" Sinha Virani: Virani's ex-maid turned DM; Rahul's ex fiance; Hrithik's wife; Timsy's stepmother (2025–2026; 2026)
- Saavi Jain as Timsy Virani: Hrithik and Mitali's daughter; Manjuri's stepdaughter (2025–2026)
- Barkha Bisht as Noina Sarabhai: Mihir's college friend, former one sided lover and business partner; Suchitra's sister; Mitali's aunt (2025–2026)
- Lucky Mehta as Suchitra "Suchu" Sarabhai: Noina's sister; Mitali's mother; Timsy's grandmother (2025–2026)
- Ketaki Dave as Daksha Virani: Himmat's widow; Chirag and Suhasi's mother (2025)
- Kamalika Guha Thakurta as Gayatri Virani: Jamnadas's widow, Hemant and Sejal’s mother (2025–2026)
- Shakti Anand as Advocate Hemant Virani: Jamnadas and Gayatri's son; Pooja's husband; Sahil and Tarun's father (2025–2026)
- Prachi Kowli as Pooja Singhania Virani: Rajeev's widow; Hemant's wife; Sahil and Tarun's mother (2025–2026)
- Sandeep Baswana as Sahil Virani: Hemant and Pooja's elder son; Ganga's second husband; Tripti's second ex-husband (2025–2026)
- Navein Prakash as Dev Virani: Sahil and Ganga's son; Devika's elder brother; Saloni's husband (2025–2026)
- Shriya Tiwari as Saloni Dhangiri Virani: Parul and Gaurav's daughter; Jatin's sister; Dev's wife (2026)
- Unknown as Devika "Diya" Virani: Sahil and Ganga's daughter; Dev's younger sister (2025; 2026)
- Suvarna Jha as Tripti Dasgupta: Sahil's second ex-wife; Subhash's second wife; Siddharth's stepmother (2026)
- Aashish Kaul as Subhash Dasgupta: Aparna's widower; Tripti's third husband; Siddharth's father; Karan's close friend (2026)
- Harshit Joshi as Siddharth "Sid" Dasgupta: Aparna and Subhash's son; Tripti's stepson; Samaira's fiance (2026)
- Unknown as Didi Bhai: Subhash's sister; Siddharth's aunt (2026)
- Unknown as Maharaj: Virani's cook & helper; Tulsi's well wisher (2025–2026)
- Hemang Palan as Naveen Parekh: Indira's husband; Sandhya, Ajay and Priya's father (2025; 2026)
- Sanjivani Sathe as Indira Parekh: Naveen's wife; Sandhya, Ajay and Priya's mother (2025; 2026)
- Shrashti Maheshwari as Sandhya Parekh: Indira and Naveen's elder daughter; Viren's ex-wife (2025; 2026)
- Ami Joshi as Priya Parekh: Indira and Naveen's younger daughter; Sandhya and Ajay's younger sister (2025; 2026)
- Bharati Achrekar as Malti Gokhale: Parmeshwar's widow; Nitin and Vrinda's mother (2025–2026)
- Kunj Anand as Nitin Gokhale: Parmeshwar and Malti's son; Supriya's husband; Gopu's father (2025)
- Bhavna Rokade as Supriya Gokhale: Nitin's wife; Gopu's mother (2025–2026)
- Saarth Kumar as Gopu Gokhale: Nitin and Supriya's son (2025)
- Sandeep Patil as Suhas: Ranvijay's friend; Vrinda's ex–fiancé (2025–2026)
- Pradeep Solanki as Vallabh Bhai: Mihir's personal assistant (2025–2026)
- Imran Hasnee as Raman: Noina's stalker; Naren's business partner (2025)
- Ashna Kishore as Shalini: Ranvijay's first ex–wife (2025)
- Medha Muskan as Ginni: Maid of the Virani's (2025)
- Ankit Bhatia as Viren Mehta: Sandhya's ex–husband (2025)
- Vishal Nayak as Vikram: Mihir's friend and colleague (2025)
- Preeti Mishra as Aarti: Employee at Bandhej Co-operative Business (2025–2026)
- Alfiya Khan as Vandana: Employee at Bandhej Co-operative Business (2025–2026)
- Richa Pandey as Kruti: Employee at Bandhej Co-operative Business (2025–2026)
- Unknown as Pratap Rai Dhangiri: Kanta's brother; Gaurav's father (2026)
- Sandhya Shungloo as Kanta: Pratap Rai's sister (2026)
- Pravesh Mishra as Gaurav Dhangiri: Pratap Rai's son; Parul's husband (2026)
- Reeta Prajapati as Parul Dhangiri: Gaurav's wife; Jatin and Saloni's mother (2026)
- Ranveer Verma as Jatin Dhangiri: Parul and Gaurav's son; Antara's husband (2026)
- Laxmi Kushwaha as Antara Dhangiri: Jatin's wife; Saloni's close friend (2026)
- Nikhil Sharma as Advocate Aryan Bhatnagar: Paridhi's childhood friend and ex-fiance (2026)
- Pankti Patel as Khushbu: Manjuri's cousin; Riyansh's partner in crime (2026)
- Akshay Khurana as Krish: Garima's boyfriend (2026)
- Murli Mali as Shankar: Subhash's former driver; Tripti's blackmailer (2026)

=== Guest appearance ===
- Apara Mehta as Savita Virani: Former matriarch of the Viranis; Mihir and Kiran's mother (2025; 2026)
- Sakshi Tanwar as Parvati Agarwal from Kahaani Ghar Ghar Kii (2025)
- Kiran Karmarkar as Om Agarwal from Kahaani Ghar Ghar Kii (2025)
- Bill Gates to promote Bill and Melinda Gates foundation (2025)
- Astrologer Janardhan Dhurve as himself (2025)
- Shruhad Goswami as Lord Krishna (2025)
- Ashika Padukone as Deepa from Shehzaadi... Hai Tu Dil Ki (2025)
- Ashish Raghav as Raj Ranjan from Tod Kar Dil Mera (2026)
- Anurima Chakraborty as Raushni Ranjan from Tod Kar Dil Mera (2026)
- Kanikka Kapur as Taara from Taara (2026)
- Debchandrima Roy Singha as Soumya Mathur from Yeh Fitoor Tera (2026)
- Ishaan Dhawan as Jeet Saxena from Yeh Fitoor Tera (2026)
- Shweta Tiwari as Sushila for promoting her film The Vvaan: Force of the Forrest (2026)
- Samiksha Jaiswal as Sunheri from Apsara (2026)

== Production ==
=== Development ===
Ekta Kapoor, the producer of the show, plans to infuse the story with a modern sensibility to resonate with the younger audience. The first promo featuring Smriti Irani was released by Star Plus on 7 July 2025. She made it clear that season two would not chase TRPs but aim to impact, entertain, probe thoughts, and inspire while raising important questions, sparking conversations, and standing out in a time dominated by visual gimmicks.

Sumanta Bose, Head of Cluster, Entertainment, JioStar said, "It's a show which is just not only about entertainment. It was a character who fought patriarchy, who taught how to do right parenting. So, it was so ahead of its time and the new storyline that we have embarked on creating, it's going to reshape the way India looks at content."

In December 2025, the show introduced a six-year time leap, depicting Tulsi and Mihir living separately after the revelation of Mihir and Noina's extramarital affair.

In July 2026, the show announced a 10-year time skip. A promo was released showcasing Tulsi being released from jail after serving her sentence for apparently killing Parth. The promo shows the house divided between Karan and Gautam, with a partition line drawn between the two sections. When Tulsi expects a warm welcome, she is instead denied entry into the house.

The screenplay of the series was crafted by Rajesh Joshi, who previously written down the first season, Anantica Sahir and Pallavi Lumba and Dheeraj Sarna penned the episodic dialogues. Ekta Kapoor served as the main creative head, overseeing the content. The show was mainly directed by Muzammil Desai and Khwaja Mughal while Siddhartha Vankar signed as a creative director. Akansha Shukla Mishra look over the daily episodes as episodic creative director.

=== Casting ===
Smriti Irani and Amar Upadhyay returned to reprise their roles as Tulsi Virani and Mihir Virani. Barkha Bisht was roped in to play this season's negative lead, Noina Sarabhai. Hiten Tejwani and Gauri Pradhan also returned to portray Karan Virani and Nandini Virani. Other returnees are Shakti Anand as Hemant Virani, Ritu Chaudhary as Shobha Virani, Ketki Dave as Daksha Virani and Kamalika Guha Thakurta as Gayatri Virani. Shagun Sharma as Pari Virani, Rohit Suchanti portraying Angad Virani and Aman Gandhi essaying Hritik Virani were introduced as the new generation characters. Tanisha Mehta was cast as Vrinda Gokhale.

In October 2025, it was confirmed that Sakshi Tanwar and Kiran Karmarkar would reprise their iconic roles as Parvati Agarwal and Om Agarwal from Kahaani Ghar Ghar Kii to celebrate the show's 25th anniversary in a special crossover with Kyunki... The crossover aimed to finally resolve the long-standing season one cliffhanger, revealing Baa's last wish – for her property to go to Tulsi through Parth.

In October 2025, Bill Gates also made his Indian television debut on Kyunki... to promote the Gates Foundation and raise awareness about child and maternal health, in connection with a baby shower ceremony of Tulsi's servant's daughter in the show.

In November 2025, Jiten Lalwani re-entered the show to play Kiran Virani, He played the role of Mihir's younger brother. Kiran plays an important role in the current storyline of Mihir and Tulsi's fractured relationship, His entry is said to be a cameo role.

In December 2025, Swati Sharma was roped to play Vaishnavi, Tulsi's hand maiden and daughter figure post leap wherein Tulsi was separately living without Mihir and viewers compared her to Mouni Roy's iconic character, Krishna Tulsi from the original parent series. Navein Prakaash was roped in to play Dev Virani, Sahil and Ganga's elder son, Navein's character is said to be a grey shaded guy with comic nature in his role.

In the same month, Prachi Kowli joined the show as Pooja Hemant Virani, replacing Prachee Shah who originally played the role earlier in its first season. Pooja's character will be positive as she was in the earlier season, who supports and stands by Tulsi against any odds.

In January 2026, Sumeet Sachdev returned to play Advocate Gautam Virani, the elder son of Mihir and Tulsi. In February 2026, Ravee Gupta returned to play Damini Gautam Virani, replacing Riva Bubber for the second time in the show. Daksh Sharma was cast in play Nakul Virani, Gautam and Damini's younger son, replacing Naman Shaw.

In April 2026, Barkha Bisht portraying Noina bid adieu to the series as her character track wrapped up. At the same month, Akashdeep Saigal returned to play Riyansh Virani, the illegitimate son of Ansh Gujral. Netizens mocked Saigal's entry as Tulsi Virani's grandson, criticizing the unrealistic age dynamic as the actor appeared older than his on-screen grandmother and too mature for the role of a young man he was portraying on screen, his on screen mother Niyati was too criticised for playing a mother too a person older than her by the netizens.

Meanwhile, Parakh Madan was cast in to play Niyati Oberoi, Ansh Gujral's ex-girlfriend before marrying Shraddha and Nandini in its first season, her character will shown living with Karan and Riyansh as a family, Niyati's character will be complex and intriguing as she will be going through a memory lapse due to her troubled and traumatic past, she also bought up Ansh first child Riyansh and Virani's eldest grandson unknown to them.

In July 2026, Shagun Sharma, who portrayed Pari Virani in the series, took a temporary break to participate in the reality television show Khatron Ke Khiladi 15. To accommodate her absence, the makers wrapped up Pari's storyline by depicting her marrying Ajay Parekh and moving abroad. Following the completion of her stint on Khatron Ke Khiladi 15, Sharma confirmed that she would not be returning to Kyunki Saas Bhi Kabhi Bahu Thi 2, officially marking her departure from the series. Nirvaan Anand who portrayed Ajay Parekh, Paridhi's husband also left the show, commenting on her farewell post on Instagram " “And then Pari and Ajay lived happily ever after!”.

In July 2026, Sandeep Baswana returned for the third time in the show to reprise his role as Sahil Virani. Suvarna Jha also returned to the show marking her return after a long break of 18 year's from the TV Industry to portray Tripti Virani. It also marks the much-awaited reunion between Tripti and Tulsi, a dynamic that was one of the defining aspects of the original series. Their face-off is expected to play a significant role in the episodes ahead as old rivalries resurface in a new chapter.

In the same month, Azhar J Malik who played the role of Karan and Nandini's younger son Raunak Virani quit the show within a month of joining, due to his prior commitments of another project with Dharma Productions. Abrar Ali replaced Malik and stepped into the role of Raunak Virani.

In August 2026, Aman Gandhi quit the show along with the spin off series, for joining Bigg Boss season 20. Also Amar Upadhyay also said to be rejoining the show to portray Mihir Virani after a short break of nearly 3 months. There was also a buzz that, Achint Kaur and Aman Verma would return to reprise their roles as Mandira Gujral and Anupam Kapadia, respectively.

In September 2026, Shubh Karaan Bhopal, joined the show as Hrithik Virani, replacing Aman Gandhi. Aman Verma and Achint Kaur made there comeback and reprised there roles Anupam Kapadia and Mandira Kapadia. Both the actors took to their instagram handles about joining the show after 25 years. Amar Upadhyay also finally made his much awaited comeback to the show after a long break of 4 months making the social media nostalgic as there wait had been finally over to the return of the character of Mihir Virani. However, there entry in the show got delayed, due to Smriti Irani's disappearance in the show for 1 week.

=== Cancellation ===
The season was initially expected to be a finite series with 167 episodes and was supposed to end in January completing 6 months, but after the show's progress and being number 1 on TRP charts for many weeks, the show got many extensions and finally concluded with 450 episodes. The writing of the final episodes and climax completed on 2 October 2026. The primary recurring cast wrapped up filming on 16 October while the main cast finished their shooting on 18 October 2026. After a successful run of more than a year, the soap opera ended on 20 October 2026. Its timeslot was filled by a supernatural series, Apsara.

== Spin-off ==
Following a positive response to the reboot version, a separate storyline featuring Angad and Vrinda, initially as an extension of Kyunki Saas... , was launched and subsequently developed into a standalone spin-off titled Kyunki Rishton Ke Bhi Roop Badalte Hain.

Since 20 March 2026, a separate storyline featuring Angad and Vrinda, operating under changed identities to investigate the conspiracies in the Jamshedpur plant, has been introduced and telecast in the latter half of the episodes. There were several speculations regarding whether it was an extension or a spin-off. The show was eventually developed as a spin-off. It was also rumoured that the show would eventually replace Kyunki Saas Bhi Kabhi Bahu Thi, as it was launched as a limited series. However, the channel debunked these rumours by issuing an official statement clarifying that the claims were false and that the series was not ending anytime soon.

== Reception ==
=== Ratings ===
The show recorded over 1.659 billion minutes of watch time across television and streaming platforms. The show received 31.1 million television viewers in just four days. Out of which 15.4 million viewers had tuned in for the premiere episode alone, according to a press release by the channel. The channel added, "The reboot season also witnessed 17,300 mentions across social media platforms."

The latest count makes Smriti Irani led Kyunki Saas Bhi Kabhi Bahu Thi 2 the highest-rated fiction launch across general entertainment channels in recent times and the biggest-ever GEC fiction debut across both television and digital in India, the release added. According to BARC, Kyunki Saas Bhi Kabhi Bahu Thi 2 recorded a 2.5 TVR on its launch day in the HSM Urban market (MF15–50 ABC demographic).

=== Critical response ===
India Today noted that the first episode serves as "a nostalgic trip down memory lane, bringing back iconic characters and moments without much new development."

Some critics argued that the reboot relied too heavily on nostalgia rather than offering fresh storylines. India Today observed that while it successfully revived iconic characters, the premiere "brought little new development beyond sentimentality." Mid-Day similarly noted that the show leaned on "sanskaar and kalesh" tropes without significant innovation, framing it as a sentimental but formulaic return. NDTV highlighted that while Smriti Irani's performance brought gravitas, the show risked "rehashing themes already explored two decades ago" instead of adapting to contemporary family dynamics.

== Awards and nominations ==
=== ITA Awards ===
Year	Category	Nominee	Role	Result	Ref.
2025	ITA Award for Best Actress in a Negative Role	Shagun Sharma	Paridhi Virani Singh	Won	
2025	ITA Award for Best Actress Drama Popular	Smriti Irani	Tulsi Virani	Nominated	
2026	Best Actress - Drama - TV	Smriti Irani	Tulsi Virani	Pending	
2026	Best Dialogue - Drama - TV	Dheeraj Sarna	—N/a	Pending	
