= Pehredaar Piya Ki =

- Created by: Sumeet Hukamchand Mittal; Shashi Mittal
- Developed by: Shashi Mittal
- Written by: Niranjan Iyengar (dialogues)
- Story by: Seema, Varsha, Garima, S.S
- Directed by: Amandeep Singh; Huma Pawan Singh
- Creative director: Saurabh Arora
- Starring: See below
- Composer: Amit Mishra
- Country of origin: India
- Original language: Hindi
- No. of seasons: 1
- No. of episodes: 31

Production
- Executive producer: Rajan Singh
- Producers: Shashi Mittal; Sumeet Hukamchand Mittal; Om Gehlot
- Cinematography: Sudesh Kotion
- Editors: Jaskaran Singh; Pradeep Singh
- Camera setup: Multi-camera
- Running time: 23 minutes
- Production company: Shashi Sumeet Productions

Original release
- Network: Sony Entertainment Television; Sony LIV (final episode)
- Release: 17 July – 28 August 2017

Pehredaar Piya Ki (transl. Protector of husband) is an Indian Hindi romantic television serial that was broadcast on Sony Entertainment Television. It premiered on 17 July and was cancelled on 28 August 2017 due to controversies regarding child marriage of the title characters. It starred Tejasswi Prakash and Affan Khan. It then returned with a leap in the plot.

== Premise ==
The series depicts the life of teenage girl Diya, who fulfills the wish of a man on his death bed by taking the responsibility of an orphan boy, Ratan Maan Singh, by marrying him. What follows next is the bond of friendship between the couple and being there for each other. She then becomes the temporary owner of Maan Singh Heritage Group of Hotels until Ratan come of age & takes over the business.

== Restructured series ==
Public backlash surrounding the show's underage marriage of 18-year-old Diya to 9-year-old Ratan prompted producer Shashi Sumeet to end the show and to restructure the idea as a new series, Rishta Likhenge Hum Naya. Affan Khan, who played the young Ratan, was replaced by Rohit Suchanti as an older Ratan.

After Pehredaar Piya Ki had aired, an online petition to ban the show was signed by more than 1 lakh people as they believed it was promoting child marriage. The case reached the BCCC, who have asked the makers of the show to change the time slot so that children couldn't watch it and air it to 10 pm slot along with a disclaimer that it does not promote child marriage. Supporters of the show started a petition against the ban, to stop targeting the show, which was signed by over 13,000 supporters.

The makers of the show, Sumeet Hukamchand Mittal and Shashi Mittal, defended their show by addressing the controversies related at a press conference in Mumbai. On 19 August 2017, a new promo was released by Sony, that starting from 22 August, the show would air at 10:30 pm IST. On 28 August, Sony TV confirmed that the show has gone off air as the makers were not happy with the late time slot, since the show was meant for particular audience. Instead of continuing with the show, they decided to end it and focus on their show with a renewed story.

== Cast ==
=== Main ===
- Tejasswi Prakash as Diya Ratan Singh, Ratan's wife.
- Affan Khan as Ratan Maan Singh, an orphan & Diya's husband.

=== Recurring ===
- Parmeet Sethi as Maan Singh
- Kishori Shahane as Padma Singh
- Gireesh Sahedev as Sajjan Singh
- Anjali Gupta as Mrs Sajan Singh
- Manisha Saxena as Isha Singh
- Jiten Lalwani as Bhuvan Singh
- Meenu Panchal as Sakshi Singh
- Achherr Bhaardwaj as Mohak Pratap Singh
- Suyyash Rai as Abhay
- Simran Natekar as Shivani
- Kasturi Banerjee as Nitya
- Varun Jain as Ayush
- Swapnil Sharma as Priya Singh

== Production ==
=== Casting ===
The story of the serial is set in Rajasthan. Tejasswi Prakash's Diya is the teen-aged female lead, as the object of affection of a nine-year-old prince. It was shot at various locations in Rajasthan including Jaipur and Mandawa.

In late August, a casting call was released for a recast of Ratan Singh to play the grown up prince in the new show titled Rishta Likhenge Hum Naya. On September 24, it was announced that Rohit Suchanti has replaced child actor Affan Khan.
