= Dheeraj Sarna =

Indian actor

- Born: Dheeraj Sarna; India
- Occupations: Actor, writer and television producer
- Years active: 2000–present
- Known for: Yash on Kutumb (TV series)
- Height: 1.78 m (5 ft 10 in)
- Spouse: Supriya Sarna (m. 2013)
- Children: Shivansh Sarna

Dheeraj Sarna is an Indian television actor, writer and producer. He is known for portraying the role of Yash on Kutumb (TV series) and lead role of Amarnath Awasthi on the comedy show Belan Wali Bahu, that aired on Colors TV. He is also known as the director of 2024 Hindi film, Sabarmati Report.

== Career ==
Sarna started his acting career in the year 2000 by guest starring in an episode of Kaahin Kissii Roz as Aseem. In the same year he was cast in a TV show Kutumb as Yash, the show written by himself. He then took a long break from acting from 2002 to 2017, so he could focus on writing for different shows and films including Koi Aap Sa and Kis Kisko Pyaar Karoon, the two films that he wrote a screenplay for. In early 2018, he returned to acting when he was cast in the comedy television series Belan Wali Bahu, opposite Krystle D'Souza, that premiered in January 2018. The show was written and produced by himself.

== Personal life ==
Saran is married to television actress Supriya Sarna.They have two sons called Shivansh & Veer.

== Filmography ==
Television
Year	Title	Role	Notes
2000	Kaahin Kissii Roz	Aseem	1 episode
2000–2001	Kutumb (TV series)	Yash	Recurring role
2005-2006	Kkavyanjali	Chaman	Recurring role
2006	Hum Paanch	Daljeet Singh	Recurring role in second season of show
2018	Belan Wali Bahu	Amarnath Awasthi	Lead role

Writer
Year	Title	Channel	Notes
2000	Kahaani Ghar Ghar Kii	Star Plus	
2000–2001	Kutumb (TV series)	Sony Entertainment Television	Dialogues
2003	Kahiin To Hoga	Star Plus	Dialogues
2005	Koi Aap Sa		Film
2005	Kkavyanjali		Dialogues
2011	Dharampatni	Imagine TV	
2013	Bani – Ishq Da Kalma	Colors TV	
2013	Kya Huaa Tera Vaada	Sony Entertainment Television	Dialogues
2013	Jodha Akbar (TV series)	Zee TV	Dialogues
2013	Chhanchhan	Sony Entertainment Television	
2013	Ek Mutthi Aasmaan (TV series)	Zee TV	
2015	Thapki Pyaar Ki	Colors TV	Dialogues
2015	Kis Kisko Pyaar Karoon		Film
2018	Belan Wali Bahu	Colors TV	Dialogues
2019–2024	Yeh Hai Chahatein	StarPlus	Dialogues
2021-2025	Bhagya Lakshmi	Zee TV	Dialogues
2020–2022	Molkki	Colors TV	Dialogues
2023	Molkki - Rishton Ki Agnipariksha	Colors TV	Dialogues
2025–present	Kyunki Saas Bhi Kabhi Bahu Thi 2	Star Plus	Dialogues
2026–present	Kyunki Rishton Ke Bhi Roop Badalte Hain	Star Plus	Dialogues

Producer
Year	Title	Channel
2017	Ek Aastha Aisi Bhee	Star Plus
2018	Belan Wali Bahu	Colors TV
2018	Main Maike Chali Jaungi Tum Dekhte Rahiyo	Sony Entertainment Television

== Awards and nominations ==
Year	Award	Category	Work	Result	Ref.
2013	Zee Rishtey Awards	Best Story	Ek Mutthi Aasmaan	Won	
