= Rishta Likhenge Hum Naya =

Indian mystery drama series

- Genre: Drama
- Created by: Sumeet Hukamchand Mittal; Shashi Mittal
- Developed by: Shashi Sumeet Mittal
- Written by: Shashi Sumeet Mittal; Jayesh Patil
- Screenplay by: Shashi Sumeet Mittal; Garima Goyal
- Directed by: Prince Dhiman; Huma Pawan Singh
- Starring: See below
- Composer: Amit Mishra
- Country of origin: India
- Original language: Hindi
- No. of seasons: 1
- No. of episodes: 149

Production
- Producers: Shashi Sumeet Mittal; Sumeet Hukamchand Mittal; Jitender S.; Rajeev P.
- Cinematography: Sudesh Kotion; Pankaj P. Kachhawa
- Editors: Jaskaran Singh; Ganga Kacharla; Rajiv Bhatt
- Camera setup: Multi-camera
- Running time: Approx. 23 minutes
- Production company: Shashi Sumeet Productions

Original release
- Network: Sony Entertainment Television
- Release: 7 November 2017 – 1 June 2018

Rishta Likhenge Hum Naya (transl. We'll write a new relation) is an Indian drama series that aired on Sony TV, starring Tejasswi Prakash and Rohit Suchanti. It premiered on 7 November 2017.

The series is a restructuring of Pehredaar Piya Ki, which received negative social media response for depicting its two central characters, Diya, an 18-year-old princess and Ratan, a 9-year-old prince, as married. The Broadcasting Content Complaints Council (BCCC) asked SET India to move the series to a later 10pm time slot and the network complied. After a drop in viewership resulting from the move, series producers opted to restructure the series for prime time, in part by removing the child marriage theme by advancing Ratan's age to adulthood and recasting the character.

== Premise ==
It follows the life of a 30-year-old girl Diya, who sacrificed 12 years of her life by fulfilling a dying man's wish on his deathbed by becoming the caretaker of his heir and son, Ratan Maan Singh. She shares no relationship with Ratan or his family and there is no greed which drives her to do this. Set against the royal canvas of Rajasthan, the show challenges the conventional perception of men being the protector of women. Ratan is constantly being targeted by attackers, and it is up to Diya to find the person behind the attacks who might as well be part of the family. The show is about Diya, a 30-year-old woman who gave up 12 years of her life to protect Ratan, a 21-year-old heir to the throne who lives in London after his parents' death in an accident and returns to Surajgarh to become the king.

== Plot ==
Since Diya's duties get over, she decides to marry Abhay Singh Rathore, her fiancé but he leaves her. Ratan learns his late father wanted him to be with Diya, so he marries her reluctantly. Ratan finds it hard to fulfill his responsibilities to Diya, also due to the nine-year age gap between them. More problems arise when Yash marries Mohana, Arpita's daughter. Ratan decides to divorce Diya, only after helping her win a case against Abhay and Arpita. Diya then realizes her love for Ratan. Another problem arises when a man claims that he is the real Ratan Maan Singh and tries to influence the entire family against Ratan. His truth is revealed, as he tries to assassinate the entire family. Ratan then realizes his love for Diya, and they work together with their family to eliminate the terrorist. The show ends revealing that Diya is pregnant with Ratan's child and Mohana is pregnant with Yash's child.

== Cast ==
=== Main ===
- Tejasswi Prakash as Diya Singh: Sajjan and Jyoti's daughter; Isha's sister; Ratan's wife (2017–2018)
- Rohit Suchanti as Ratan Singh: Maan and Padma's son; Diya's husband (2017–2018)

=== Recurring ===
- Siddharth Shivpuri/Puneet Sharma as Yashwant "Yash" Singh: Raghu and Priya's son; Mohana's husband (2017–2018)
- Ravjeet Singh as Fake Ratan Singh (2018)
- Aditi Deshpande as Sushma Singh: Padma's sister; Bhuvan's wife; Raghu and Sakshi's mother; Yash's grandmother (2017–2018)
- Adarsh Gautam as Sajjan Singh: Jyoti's husband; Diya and Isha's father (2017–2018)
- Anjali Gupta as Jyoti Devi Singh: Sajjan's wife; Diya and Isha's mother (2017–2018)
- Jiten Lalwani as Bhuvan Dev Singh: Nithya's brother; Sushma's husband; Raghu and Sakshi's father; Yash's grandfather (2017–2018)
- Meenu Panchal as Sakshi Singh: Bhuvan and Sushma's daughter; Raghu's sister; Mohak's wife (2017–2018)
- Achherr Bhaardwaj as Mohak Singh: Sakshi's husband (2017–2018)
- Kasturi Banerjjee as Nithya Singh: Bhuvan's sister; Ayush's mother (2017–2018)
- Varun Jain as Ayush Banna Singh: Nithya's son; Isha's husband (2017–2018)
- Manisha Saxena as Isha Singh: Sajjan and Jyoti's daughter; Diya's sister; Ayush's wife (2017–2018)
- Suyyash Rai as Abhay Rathore: Arpita's brother (2017–2018)
- Kishwer Merchant Rai as Arpita Singh: Abhay's sister; Mohana's mother (2018)
- Garima Parihar as Mohana Singh: Arpita's daughter; Yash's wife (2018)
- Gauri Singh as Priya Singh: Raghu's wife; Yash's mother (2017–2018)
- Urvashi Sharma as Meethi (2018)
- Aashish Kaul as Raghuwant "Raghu" Singh: Bhuvan and Sushma's son; Sakshi's brother; Priya's husband; Yash's father (2017–2018)
- Kishori Shahane as Padma Singh: Sushma's sister; Maan's wife; Ratan's mother
- Khalid Siddiqui as Maan Singh: Padma's husband; Ratan's father
- Ahmad Harhash as Yuvraj Malhotra: Priya's brother (2017–2018)

== Production ==
=== Casting ===
The cast has already been finalised. While some characters from Pehredaar Piya Ki series are being carried over into this new series, new cast members have joined them, too. Rohit Suchanti has replaced child actor Affan Khan as a recast of Ratan Singh followed by Siddharth Shivpuri, Gauri Singh and Khalid Siddiqui. Siddharth Shivpuri, then decided to quit the show, and is being replaced by Puneet Sharma. The serial is set in the western India state of Rajasthan in the city of Bikaner & Machkund of Dholpur.
