= Kyunki Rishton Ke Bhi Roop Badalte Hain =

Spin–off of Kyunki Saas Bhi Kabhi Bahu Thi 2

- Genre: Family drama Romance
- Created by: Ekta Kapoor
- Based on: Kyunki Saas Bhi Kabhi Bahu Thi 2
- Developed by: Ekta Kapoor
- Written by: Dialogue: Dheeraj Sarna
- Directed by: Khwaja Mughal; Shubh Jaiswal; Kanha
- Creative directors: Siddhartha Vankar; Aakansha Shukla; Prabjyot Gujral
- Starring: Tanisha Mehta; Rohit Suchanti; Aman Gandhi; Prachi Singh; Navein Prakaashh; Shriya Tiwari; Shubh Karaan Bhopal; Shakti Anand; Barkha Bisht
- Opening theme: "...Rishton Ke Bhi Roop Badalte Hain" by Priya Bhattacharya
- Country of origin: India
- Original language: Hindi
- No. of seasons: 1
- No. of episodes: 231

Production
- Executive producers: Chetan Avchar; Yaseen Shaikh
- Producers: Ekta Kapoor; Shobha Kapoor
- Editors: Vikas Sharma; Vishal Sharma; Sandeep N. Bhatt
- Camera setup: Multi-camera
- Running time: 16–22 minutes
- Production company: Balaji Telefilms

Original release
- Network: Star Plus
- Release: 20 March 2026 – present

Related
- Kyunki Saas Bhi Kabhi Bahu Thi; Kyunki Saas Bhi Kabhi Bahu Thi 2

Kyunki Rishton Ke Bhi Roop Badalte Hain (transl. Because The Forms of Relationships Change Too) is an Indian Hindi-language romantic drama television series that premiered on Star Plus on 20 March 2026 and streams digitally on JioHotstar. Produced by Ekta Kapoor and Shobha Kapoor under the banner of Balaji Telefilms, it is a spin-off of Kyunki Saas Bhi Kabhi Bahu Thi 2 and stars Tanisha Mehta and Rohit Suchanti in lead roles.

== Plot ==
Vrinda Virani takes charge of the Jamshedpur plant after she and Angad leave Akshay and Madhavi at boarding school. Angad faces trouble with Mangal, gets entangled in Bheekhu’s condition to hit Vrinda with a stone, and is later hired by Vrinda despite Nandu’s objections. During Ram Navami, Angad is chosen to play Ram, while Mangal accuses him of the factory scam and Vrinda suspects Vikrant after the CCTV footage is deleted. Meanwhile, Bharti grows suspicious of Vrinda and Angad’s late-night calls, Vikrant plots to become the Viranis’ son-in-law, and Bharti’s confrontation with Angad is interrupted by Madhavi’s sudden arrival.

== Cast ==
=== Main ===
- Tanisha Mehta as Vrinda Gokhale Virani: Owner of Jamshedpur plant of Virani Group of Industries; Malti and Parmeshwar's daughter (2026–present)
- Rohit Suchanti as Angad "AV" Virani: A rockstar and former owner of Jamshedpur plant of Virani Group of Industries; Kesar and Anupam's elder son (2026–present)
- Aman Gandhi/Shubh Karaan Bhopal as Hrithik Virani: Anupam and Kesar's younger son (2026)/(2026–present)
- Prachi Singh as DM Manjuri "Munni" Sinha Virani: Virani's ex-maid turned DM; Hrithik's second wife (2026–present)
- Navein Prakaashh as Dev Virani: Sahil and Ganga's son (2026–present)
- Shriya Tiwari as Saloni Dhangiri Virani: Parul and Gaurav's elder daughter (2026–present)
- Shakti Anand as Advocate Hemant Virani: Partriarch of the Jamshedpur Virani family; Gayatri and Jamnadas's son; Pooja's husband (2026–present)
- Barkha Bisht as Noina Sarabhai: Hemant's lover; Mihir's college friend and former one sided obsessive lover; Viran's business partner; Suchitra's sister; Mitali's aunt (2026–present)

=== Recurring ===
- Prachi Kowli as Pooja Virani: Rajeev's widow; Hemant's wife (2026–present)
- Kunj Anand as Nitin Gokhale: Parmeshwar and Malti's son; Supriya's husband (2026–present)
- Bhavna Rokade as Supriya Gokhale: Nitin's wife; Gopu's mother (2026–present)
- Aditya Khurana as Gopu Gokhale: Supriya and Nitin's son (2026–present)
- Het Thakkar as Akshay Virani: Angad and Vrinda's elder son; Madhavi's twin brother (2026–present)
  - Ansh Saini as child Akshay (2026)
- Simran Tomar as Madhavi Virani: Angad and Vrinda's daughter; Akshay's twin sister (2026–present)
  - Swara Kadam as child Madhavi (2026)
- Shraddha Tripathi as Timsy Virani: Hrithik and Mitali's daughter; Munni's stepdaughter (2026–present)
  - Saavi Jain as child Timsy (2026)
- Shaurya Vijayvargiya as Aarav Virani: Angad and Vrinda's younger son; Dev and Saloni's adopted son (2026–present)
- Aria Sakaria as Tara Virani: Dev and Saloni's daughter; Hrithik and Munni's adopted daughter (2026–present)
- Aditi Sanwal as Mitali Sarabhai: Suchitra's daughter; Noina's niece; Hrithik's ex-wife; Timsy's mother (2026)
- Gaurav S Bajaj as Kartik Patel: Viren's son; Vrinda's new business partner and fiancé (2026)
- Parminder Singh Kainth as Viren Patel: Kartik's father; Dev's business accomplice (2026)
- Niju Machhan as Mrs Patel: Viren's wife; Kartik's mother (2026)
- Siddharth Dhawan as Vikram: Mihir's friend and colleague (2026)
- Bharati Achrekar as Malti Gokhale: Parmeshwar's widow; Nitin and Vrinda's mother; Gopu, Akshay, Madhavi and Aarav's grandmother (2026)
- Kushagre Dua as Vikrant "Vicky" Thakur: CFO of Jamshedpur plant of Viranis Group of Industries; Vrinda's obsessive ex-lover (2026)
- Pardeep Singh as Mangal: Employee at Jamshedpur plant of Viranis Group of Industries; Bharti's ex-fiancé (2026)
- Vinayak Bhave as Bheekhu Chaudhary: Former head of the Viranis Group of industries workers; Bharti's father (2026)
- Aarchi Sachdeva as Bharti Chaudhary: Head of the Viranis Froup of industries workers;;Bheekhu's daughter; Angad's second ex-wife (2026)
- Unknown as Priyanka Dhangiri: Parul and Gaurav's younger daughter (2026)

=== Guests ===
- Shagun Sharma as Paridhi "Pari" Virani Parekh: Anupam and Kesar's daughter; Ajay's wife (2026)
- Tanish Mahendru as Ranvijay Singh: Paridhi's ex-husband (2026)
- Sandeep Patil as Suhas: Ranvijay's friend; Vrinda's ex-fiancé (2026)
- Swati Sharma as Vaishnavi Virani: Tulsi's trusted aide in her business; Parth's widow; Nakul's wife (2026)
- Sohil Singh Jhuti as Parth Virani: Karan and Nandini's elder son; Vaishnavi's first husband (2026)
- Reeta Prajapati as Parul Dhangiri: Gaurav's wife (2026)
- Laxmi Kushwaha as Antara Dhangiri: Jatin's wife (2026)
- Sandeep Baswana as Sahil Virani: Hemant and Pooja's elder son; Dev and Devika's father (2026)
- Amar Upadhyay as Mihir Virani: Mansukh and Savita's elder son; Tulsi's husband; Gautam, Karan, and Shobha's father (2026)

== Production ==
=== Development ===
Following a positive response to the reboot version, a separate storyline featuring Angad and Vrinda, initially as an extension of Kyunki Saas... , was launched which was telecasted in the later part of the episodes. Subsequently, it was developed into a standalone spin-off.

It was rumoured that the show would eventually replace the parent series. However, the channel debunked these rumours by issuing an official statement clarifying that the claims were false and that Kyunki Saas... was not ending anytime soon.

Amid rumours surrounding a proposed spin-off of Kyunki Saas Bhi Kabhi Bahu Thi, along with the circulation of unauthorised promotional content suggesting her involvement, Smriti Irani issued a legal warning against the misuse of her name and image. Irani clarified that she is not involved in any such project.

The title of the show is inspired from the title song of 2000's mega soap opera, Kyunki Saas Bhi Kabhi Bahu Thi, which itself is the original parent show.

=== Casting ===
Rohit Suchanti and Tanisha Mehta initially entered the spin-off as Angad and Vrinda under secret identities while investigating issues at the Jamshedpur plant. Kushagre Dua was signed to play the negative lead, Vikrant Thakur, while Pradeep Singh Toor joined the cast in a pivotal role as a factory worker. In April 2026, Tanish Mahendru re-entered the series as Ranvijay.

In June 2026, Aman Gandhi, Prachi Singh, Shriya Tiwari, and Navein Prakash joined the spin-off, reprising their respective roles from the original series. Later, Shakti Anand and Prachi Kowli, portraying Advocate Hemant and Pooja Virani respectively, also shifted to the show.

In July 2026, the show took a leap of 10 years along with the parent show. Gaurav S Bajaj joined the show to portray Mr. Kartik Patel, a businessman opposite Tanisha Mehta. Het Thakkar was cast as grown-up Akshay Virani. Barkha Bisht returned to the spin-off as Noina.

In August 2026, Aman Gandhi who portrayed Hritik Virani, left the show as well as the parent show Kyunki Saas Bhi Kabhi Bahu Thi 2 for Bigg Boss 20. Shubh Karaan Bhopal was then cast to replace Gandhi as Hritik. In mid-August 2026, Aditya Khurana joined the show as Gopu Gokhale.

After Bisht's entry as Noina Sarabhai, in November, Amar Upadhyay is also set to reprise his role as Mihir Virani in the spin-off after the second season ended in October 2026.

== Reception ==
Kyunki Rishton Ke Bhi Roop Badalte Hain was in the second position of BARC rating list in its launch week with a TRP of 1.9 and had a reach of 2.3 million impressions and in the third position in its second week of week 12. The show fell to sixth position in week 13. In week 14, the show ranked at fifth place and recorded a 1.7 TRP and 2.3 TVR. In May, it maintained a rating of 1.4 and continued to be in top 10 shows. The series saw a decline in ratings and got a 1.2 TVR at ninth place in week 21 of June 2026.
