= Love and Affairs =

Indian web series

- Genre: Romantic
- Directed by: Abhishek Saha
- Country of origin: India
- Original language: Bengali
- No. of seasons: 1
- No. of episodes: 5

Production
- Production company: Storiboat Production

Original release
- Release: 20 June 2020

Love and Affairs is a 2020 Bengali web series published during the lockdown period. a hoichoi original series, is based on Erich Segal's novel, Love Story. It features Indraneil Sengupta, Barkha Sengupta and Debapriyo Mukherjee in the lead roles.

== Description ==
Directed by Abhishek Saha this Bengali web series plot revolves around the life of a married couple filled with lies and twists. The relationship between the couple is affected by the few events and a bunch of lies. With free flow of story-telling and amazing cinematography, the series gives great visual appearance for the audience. The Series started streaming on the Bengali OTT platform hoichoi from 20 June 2020.

== Cast ==
- Indraneil Sengupta as Abhishek
- Barkha Sengupta as Roshni
- Debapriyo Mukherjee as Indra
- Swapoorna Sen as Sneha

== Episodes ==
Series	Episodes	Originally released
1	5	20 June 2020

=== Season 1 (2020) ===
The series started streaming from 20 June 2020 with five episodes.

No.	Title	Directed by	Original release date
1	"Love"	Abhishek Saha	20 June 2020
2	"Affair"	Abhishek Saha	20 June 2020
3	"Broken"	Abhishek Saha	20 June 2020
4	"Possess"	Abhishek Saha	20 June 2020
5	"Confessions"	Abhishek Saha	20 June 2020
