= Barkha Bisht =

Indian actress

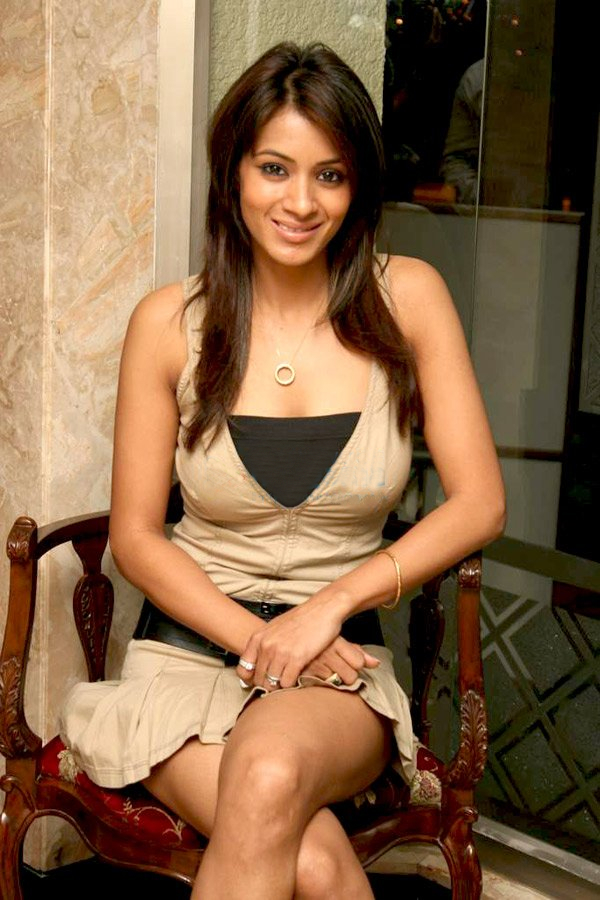
- Barkha Bisht
- Born: 28 December 1979 (age 46); Hisar, Haryana, India
- Other name: Barkha Sengupta
- Occupations: Actress, model
- Years active: 2004–present
- Spouse: Indraneil Sengupta (m. 2008; div. 2022)
- Children: 1

Barkha Bisht is an Indian actress who mainly works in Hindi television, along with Bengali films and Hindi films. She made her first television appearance in Kitni Mast Hai Zindagi as Udita. She made her screen debut in Hindi Film Raajneeti (2010) and Bengali film debut in Dui Prithibi (2010). She is best known for portraying Ayesha Haider in Naamkarann. In 2025, Bisht portrayed Noina Sarabhai in iconic soap opera Kyunki Saas Bhi Kabhi Bahu Thi 2.

== Personal life ==
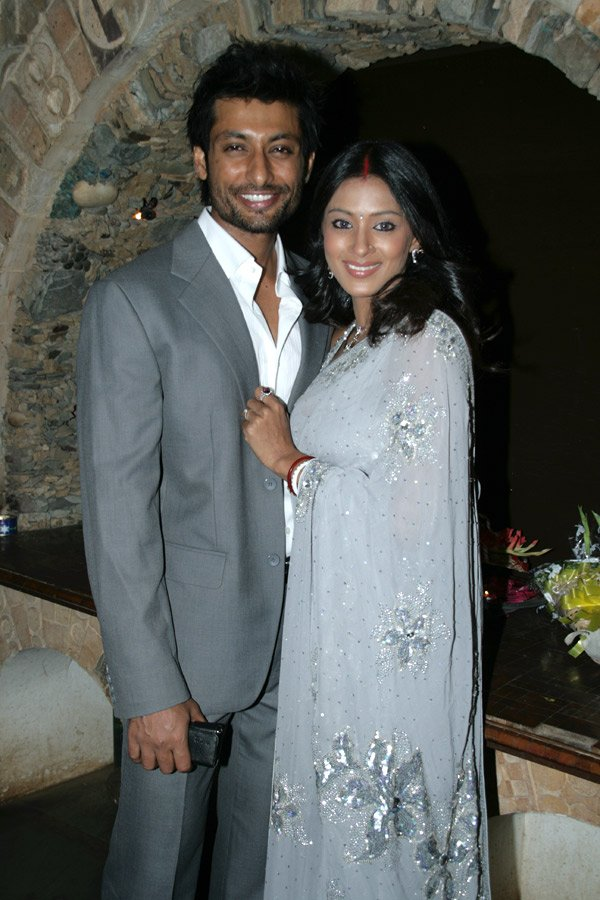
Barkha with ex-husband Indraneil Sengupta

Barkha was born on 28 December 1979 in Hisar, Haryana. She spent her childhood in military towns specially in Kolkata, as her father was a Colonel. She is a Garhwali and originally belongs to Dehradun in Uttarakhand. She is the youngest of three sisters, with the eldest and the middle sister being MBAs and corporate professionals. She married Indraneil Sengupta on 2 March 2008, her fellow actor and co-star from Pyaar Ke Do Naam: Ek Raadha, Ek Shyaam and Doli Saja Ke and a film based in lockdown titled Choices, and changed her name to Barkha Sengupta. In October 2011, she gave birth to a girl named Meira and was later divorced in 2022.

Since 2022, she is dating actor and producer Ashish Sharma.

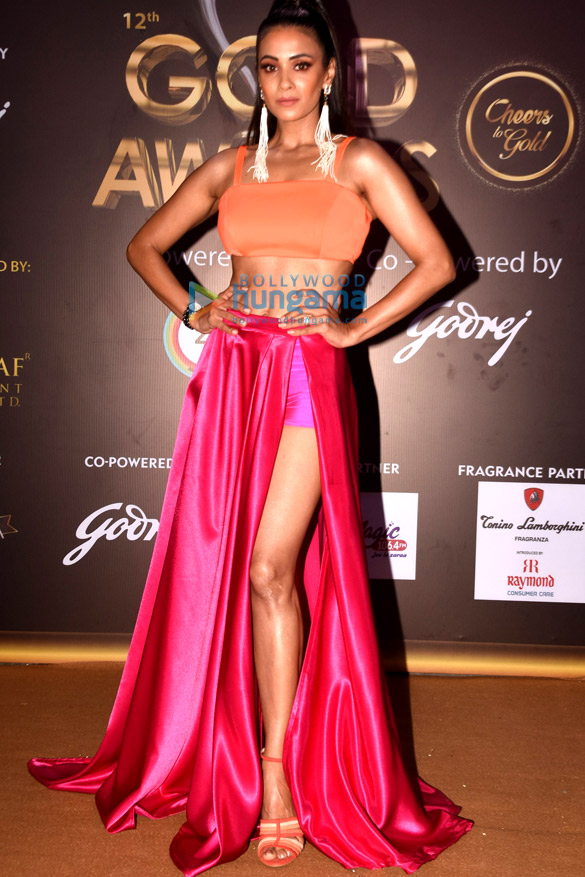
Barkha Bisht at the Zee Gold Awards 2019

== Career ==
She started her career on television with a show called Kitni Mast Hai Zindagi, which was aired on MTV India. This was followed by another television show on StarPlus called Pyaar Ke Do Naam: Ek Raadha, Ek Shyaam, where she played the lead roles of Shyaama, Raadha and Radhika. She has also hosted a film-news based programme called Popkorn on Zoom TV. She has played the lead role of Anupama in Doli Saja Ke on Sahara One channel.

She has played cameo roles on the shows Kasautii Zindagii Kay, Kyaa Hoga Nimmo Kaa and Kkavyanjali. She participated in a reality show called Saas v/s Bahu. Her next performance was the central character Dhani in Sajan Ghar Jaana Hai. She then played the character of Hanuman's mother Añjanā on the show Sankat Mochan Mahabali Hanumaan on Sony TV, and also played the lead role of Prema Shalini on SAB TV's Shrimaan Shrimati Phir Se. She has also played the role of Bhairavi in Kaal Bhairav Rahasya Season 2. She acted in the serials Chandragupta Maurya and Paramavatar Shri Krishna by playing the roles of Tarini, the wife of Dhana Nanda and Draupadi respectively. She also played role of Nandini in star plus's Shaadi Mubarak.

== Filmography ==
=== Film ===
Key
†	Denotes films that have not yet been released

Year	Title	Role	Notes
2010	Raajneeti	Dancer	In song "Ishq Barse"
2010	Dui Prithibi	Mandakini	Bengali film
2011	Ami Shubhash Bolchi	Charulata Bose, B Charu	Bengali film
2013	Goliyon Ki Raasleela Ram-Leela	Kesar	
2013	Villain	Meherunnisa aka Laila	Bengali film
2014	Samrat & Co.	Revati Singh	
2014	Action	Raka (Rekha)	Bengali film
2015	Black	Item number	Bengali film
2019	PM Narendra Modi	Jashodaben Modi	
2021	Choices		
2023	1920: Horrors of the Heart	Radhika	
2023	Safed	Radha	
2024	Khadaan	Jamuna	Bengali film
2025	Kesari Veer		

=== Television ===
Year	Title	Role	Notes
2004–2005	Kitni Mast Hai Zindagi	Udita	
2005	Kasautii Zindagii Kay	Diya Sengupta	
2005	Kkavyanjali	Arpita Nanda / Arpita Vansh Malhotra	
2005	Kaisa Ye Pyar Hai	Simone	
2006	Kyaa Hoga Nimmo Kaa	Naina	
2006	Pyaar Ke Do Naam: Ek Raadha, Ek Shyaam	Shyama	
2006	Pyaar Ke Do Naam: Ek Raadha, Ek Shyaam	Radha Sharma	
2006	Pyaar Ke Do Naam: Ek Raadha, Ek Shyaam	Radhika	
2006	Popkorn Newz	Host	
2007	Aahat		Episode- Khel
2007	Ssshhhh...Phir Koi Hai	Tanya	Episode- Tattoo man
2007	Nach Baliye 3	Contestant	
2007–2009	Doli Saja Ke	Anupama Kapoor / Anupama Chaitanya Shekhawat / Anupama Daksh Singhania	
2008–2009	Doli Saja Ke	Tiya Kapoor	
2008	Saas v/s Bahu	Contestant	
2008	Ek Khiladi Ek Haseena	Contestant	Along with Nikhil Chopra
2009	Dancing Queen	Contestant	
2009	Jhalak Dikhhla Jaa 3	Guest Contestant	
2010	Sajan Ghar Jaana Hai	Dhaani Ambar Raghuvanshi	
2012	Comedy Circus Ke Ajoobe	Host	
2013	Parvarrish – Kuchh Khattee Kuchh Meethi	Pinky Jeet Ahuja	
2013	Yeh Hai Aashiqui	English professor	
2014	SuperCops Vs Super Villains	Arina/Samara/Binaki	Cameo role
2014–2015	Tum Saath Ho Jab Apne	Mariam Tauseef Baig / Mariam Imran Siddiqui	
2014–2015	Box Cricket League 1	Contestant	Captain and Player of Chandigarh Cubs
2015–2017	Sankat Mochan Mahabali Hanumaan	Añjanā	
2016	Box Cricket League 2	Contestant	Player in Chandigarh Cubs
2016–2017	Naamkarann	Asha Ashish Mehta / Ayesha Haider	
2017	Tenali Rama	Goddess Kali	Cameo season 1
2018	Partners Trouble Ho Gayi Double	Shikha	Cameo
2018	Laal Ishq	Shalu	Episodic role
2018	Shrimaan Shrimati Phir Se	Prema Shalini	
2018	Kaal Bhairav Rahasya Season 2	Bhairavi	
2019	Chandragupta Maurya	Tarini	
2019	Paramavatar Shri Krishna	Draupadi	
2020–2021	Shaadi Mubarak	Nandini Chirtubal	
2022	Swaraj	Rani Abbakka	
2024	Mera Balam Thanedaar	Meethi	
2024	Safal Hogi Teri Aradhana	Damini	
2024	Tenali Rama	Goddess Kali	Cameo
2025	Jaadu Teri Nazar – Daayan Ka Mausam	Kaamini	Cameo
2025–2026	Kyunki Saas Bhi Kabhi Bahu Thi 2	Noina Sarabhai	
2026–present	Kyunki Rishton Ke Bhi Roop Badalte Hain	Noina Sarabhai	

=== Web series ===
Year	Title	Role	Language	Ref
2019	Kamini	Kamini	Bengali	
2019	Coldd Lassi Aur Chicken Masala	Seema	Hindi	
2020	Ratri Ke Yatri	Nishaat	Hindi	
2020	Love and Affairs	Roshni	Bengali	
2022–2023	Duranga	Prachi Banne	Hindi	
2022	Mukhbir - The Story of a Spy	Begum Anar	Hindi	
2023	Hunter Tootega Nahi Todega	Swati	Hindi	
2023	Asur	Vrinda Shrivastav	Hindi	
2024	Naam Gum Jayega		Hindi	
2025	Power of Paanch	Tanu Shergill	Hindi	
2025	Power of Paanch	Tabu Luthra	Hindi	
