= Parakh Madan =

Indian television actress

- Born: Bhilai, Chhattisgarh, India
- Occupations: Actress; Model
- Years active: 2006–present
- Known for: Saathii Re — Saat Kadam... Saat Janam; Monica Mogre – Case Files; Kalash – Ek Vishwaas; Qurbaan Hua; Meet: Badlegi Duniya Ki Reet; Bhagya Lakshmi; Kyunki Saas Bhi Kabhi Bahu Thi 2
- Spouse: Adhiraj Singh (m. 2010)
- Parents: Gireesh Madan (father); Rita Bhalla Madan (mother)
- Relatives: Palkein Madan Gupta (sister)

Parakh Madan is an Indian film and television actress who has appeared in Hindi films such as Dev.D (2009) and Jai Santoshi Maa (2006). She is married to Lt. Col Adhiraj Singh.

== Career ==
She started her television career with the television series Saathii Re — Saat Kadam... Saat Janam (2006–2007), where she played the female lead, Suman. Subsequently, she worked in Burey Bhi Hum Bhale Bhi Hum (2009) (Star Plus), she worked in crime show Monica Mogre – Case Files (2009), and Piya Ka Ghar (Sahara One).

In 2012, she bagged the role of Harry in Sony Entertainment Television's Bade Achhe Lagte Hain. From 2012 to 2013, she played Natasha Amber Shastri in Sahara One's Rishton Ke Bhanwar Mein Uljhi Niyati. In 2013, she joined the cast of Life OK's Savdhaan India. In 2014, she appeared in Life OK's Tumhari Paakhi as Suman Saxena. In the same year, she played the role Bindiya in Zee TV's Sapne Suhane Ladakpan Ke. In 2015, she portrayed Nivedita Luthra in Life OK's Kalash – Ek Vishwaas. She quit the show in April 2016.

In 2020, she returned to TV after 4 years with Zee TV's Qurbaan Hua as Gazala Rahil Baig. From February 2022 to May 2023, she appeared as Masoom in Zee TV's Meet: Badlegi Duniya Ki Reet. She entered Bhagya Lakshmi post 7-year leap as Aanchal in June 2024 and portrayed till the conclusion of the show in June 2025.

In May 2026, she joined Ekta Kapoor's iconic soap opera, Kyunki Saas Bhi Kabhi Bahu Thi 2 as Niyati along with Akashdeep Saigal.

== Filmography ==
=== Films ===
Year	Title	Role	Notes	Ref(s)
2006	Jai Santoshi Maa	Neha		
2009	Dev.D	Rasika Singh		

== Television ==
Year	Serial	Role	Notes
2006–2007	Saathii Re — Saat Kadam... Saat Janam	Suman	Lead Role
2009	Monica Mogre – Case Files	Inspector Monica Mogre	Lead Role
2009	Burey Bhi Hum Bhale Bhi Hum	Krishna Jay Popat	
2012	Bade Achhe Lagte Hain	Harry	
2012–2013	Rishton Ke Bhanwar Mein Uljhi Niyati	Natasha Amber Shastri	
2013	Savdhaan India		Episodic role
2014	Tumhari Paakhi	Suman Saxena	
2014	Sapne Suhane Ladakpan Ke	Bindiya	
2015–2016	Kalash – Ek Vishwaas	Nivedita Luthra	
2020–2021	Qurbaan Hua	Gazala Rahil Baig	
2022–2023	Meet: Badlegi Duniya Ki Reet	Masoom Ahlawat	
2023	Kavya – Ek Jazbaa, Ek Junoon	Renu Sinha	
2024	Anupamaa	Diya	
2024—2025	Bhagya Lakshmi	Aanchal	
2026	Kyunki Saas Bhi Kabhi Bahu Thi 2	Niyati Oberoi	
2026–present	Dil Ki Bewafaiyaan		
