= Kkavyanjali =

Indian television series

- Genre: Romantic drama
- Created by: Ekta Kapoor
- Written by: Mahesh Pandey; Vipul Mehta; Anand Vardhan; Ila Bedi Dutta; Anjana Sood; Gauri Kodimala; Dialogue: Dheeraj Sarna
- Story by: Mahesh Pandey; Vipul Mehta
- Directed by: Anil V. Kumar; Garry Bhinder; Jasbir Bhatti; Deepak Chavan
- Creative directors: Nivedita Basu; Rahul Khanna; Krip Narayana
- Starring: Anita Hassanandani; Rakshak Sahni; Eijaz Khan
- Music by: Pritam
- Opening theme: "Woh Mile The..." by KK
- Country of origin: India
- Original language: Hindi
- No. of episodes: 345

Production
- Producers: Ekta Kapoor; Shobha Kapoor
- Cinematography: Sanjay K. Memane; Sukhwinder Singh
- Editors: Vkas Sharma; Sandeep Bhatt; Swpanil Nerurkar
- Running time: 24 minutes
- Production company: Balaji Telefilms

Original release
- Network: Star Plus
- Release: 25 January 2005 – 28 August 2006

Kkavyanjali is an Indian television romantic drama series that aired on Star Plus from 25 January 2005 to 28 August 2006. The series starred Anita Hassanandani, Rakshak Sahni and Eijaz Khan.

It is the tale of two lovers who love each other deeply but can never be together.

== Plot ==
Kkavya Nanda, a charming and eligible young man, is the only son of the late Mayank Nanda (Ronit Roy) and his wife, Nitya Nanda (Amrita Singh). He is the sole heir to more than half of the Nanda Group of Industries.

Kkavya is returning to India after several years abroad, and his close-knit joint family eagerly anticipates his arrival. Numerous parties and celebrations have been organised to welcome him home. At one such gathering, Kkavya encounters a girl who leaves a lasting impression on him.

After this first encounter, he repeatedly sees the same girl in various places, but is not able to speak to her on all occasions. However, her memory haunts him and eventually, he finds himself falling in love with this mysterious woman.

After a year of Kkavya's death, Anjali becomes a stronger person. She starts performing Kkavya's duties in the family and looking after the family business.

Then a lookalike of Kkavya named Soham (Eijaz Khan) enters the program, Anjali had made it up to the family that he is Kkavya so she can find the murderer of Kkavya. Soham seems to be an evil character initially.

However soon after, Soham finds out about Kkavya's killer who was Yug. Soham decides to prove to Anjali that the killer is Yug (Hiten Tejwani) but Yug tries to blame Kkavya and Nitya's death on Shaurya but everything is found out by Soham and he brings proof and Yug kills himself.

Soon after that Soham realises that he loves Anjali but so does Shaurya. Anjali also starts to love him and Shaurya sees this in their eyes so when Shaurya and Anjali are about to get married, Shaurya stops the wedding and says bad stuff about Anjali and Soham says out loud Anjali is not and he also shouts out that he loves her. Shaurya said he knew as it was his plan to bring out his feelings. Then Soham and Anjali get married and live happily ever after with the blessings of the family.

== Cast ==
=== Main ===
- Anita Hassanandani as Anjum Salve / Anjali Salve / Anjali Nanda / Anjali Sahni
- Rakshak Sahni / Eijaz Khan as Kkavya Nanda
- Eijaz Khan as Dr. Soham Sahni

=== Recurring ===
- Amrita Singh as Nitya Nanda
- Iqbal Khan as Shaurya Nanda
- Sushmita Mukherjee as Romilla Nanda
- Shailesh Gulabani as Nihal Nanda
- Achala Sachdev / Zohra Sehgal as Bebe
- Ronit Roy as Mayank Nanda
- Vikrant Rai as Jai Nanda
- Aarun Nagar as Arun
- Pradeep Kharab / Sandeep Baswana as Shlok Nanda
- Nandini Singh as Pammi Mittal
- Kishwer Merchant as Vanshita Nanda
- Nisha Sareen / Megha Gupta as Disha Jai Nanda
- Talat Rekhi as Yash Nanda
- Vidya Sinha as Sharmila Nanda
- Soni Singh / Barkha Bisht / Mitika Sharma as Arpita Nanda / Arpita Vansh Malhotra
- Shabbir Ahluwalia as Vansh Malhotra
- Chaitanya Choudhury as Vayu Kapoor
- Shivalika Sharma as Rohina Nanda
- Hiten Tejwani as Yug Mittal
- Riva Bubber as Sonia
- Shilpa Tulaskar as Mrs. Mittal
- Madhumalati Kapoor as Khala
- Savita Prabhune as Mrs. Salve
- Sudhir Dalvi as Mr. Salve
- Poonam Joshi as Bindiya
- Ali Asgar as Adeep Nanda
- Akshay Anand as Aman Kapoor
- Abir Goswami as Aarav Nanda
- Rupali Ganguly as Mona Mittal
- Dheeraj Sarna as Chaman
- Aashish Kaul as Mr. Malhotra
- Anjali Mukhi as Mrs. Malhotra
- Karan Patel as Kanishk Malhotra
- Roshni Chopra as Reeva
- Salil Acharya / Sandeep Bhansali as Sandeep "Sandy" Nanda
- Arunima Sharma as Priya
- Nirmal Pandey / Rajiv Paul as Naveen Nanda
- Rocky Verma as Mr. Sad
- Kanika Maheshwari as Neha
- Manasi Parekh as Akshara
- Abhinav Kapoor as Gaurav

=== Special appearances ===
- Shweta Tiwari as Prerna
- Neha Bamb
- Sakshi Tanwar (twice) as Parvati
- Smriti Zubin Irani
- Achint Kaur
- Chetan Hansraj as Chetan

== Production ==
₹90 Million had been spent on the marketing of the series before its premiere.

Mainly filmed in India at Mumbai, one of the show's sequences was filmed at Hong Kong during 2005 for a total of ten episodes, and by collaboration with Hong Kong Tourism Board, various domestic locations were promoted in the series.

In a sequence, to depict a deluge in Mumbai at that time (2005), about 80 tankers were used to create false floods, with the main lead caught in the midst of it all.

In June 2006, the series had a crossover with Kahaani Ghar Ghar Kii.

In March 2005, Rakshak Sahni playing Kkavya was replaced in the series, due to his incapability of bringing life into his role and also when he wanted for a ten-day break and Eijaz Khan was made to quit Kahiin To Hoga for Sahni's role.

Bollywood actress Amrita Singh and Vidya Sinha made their television debut with the series.

Days before its end, in August 2006, Amrita Singh quit the series owing professional ethics followed by the death of her character.

== Reception ==
Kkavyanjali which premiered at 9:30pm (IST), which Producer Ekta Kapoor considered one of her critical show at that time with a great hope, was touted as the best fiction launch of the year 2005 but did not receive the expected success.

It opened with a rating of 13.91 TVR on 25 January and averaged 11.7 in that week, becoming the ninth-most-watched Hindi TV show overall. Specifically, in Gujarat and Madhya Pradesh it received 21 TVR and 29.4 TVR. However, the following weeks, the ratings dipped. In May 2006, when the storyline took a leap and with entry of Iqbal Khan, it improved quite a bit which was not sufficient to get the expected ratings. It got off-aired in August 2006 because of the conflict between Ekta Kapoor's Balaji Telefilms and Star Plus due to its change in storyline and time slot from 9:30 to 9:00 pm (IST), which received quite less ratings then in that slot compared to their rival channel Zee TV's Saat Phere:Saloni Ka Safar.

The show got the awards in both categories i-e Technical and Programming for both Jury and Popularity. Kahaani Ghar Ghar Kii had a drop in its ratings in 2005, so Ekta Kapoor (producer) crossed it over with Kkavyanjali after which Kahaani saw a spike in its ratings. Anita Hassanandani charged 40 thousand per day at that time. The show was also shot in Hong Kong. Pritam charged 20 lakhs for its unique music composition.

== Awards ==
Award Show	Category	Recipient(s)
Year-2005
Indian Television Academy Awards	Best Music	Pritam
Indian Television Academy Awards	Best Actress - Jury	Anita Hassanandani
Indian Television Academy Awards	Best Serial - Jury	Ekta Kapoor and Shobha Kapoor
Indian Telly Awards	Best On Screen Couple	Eijaz Khan and Anita Hassanandani
Indian Telly Awards	Best Drama Series	Ekta Kapoor and Shobha Kapoor
Year-2006
Indian Television Academy Awards	Best Serial - Popular	Ekta Kapoor and Shobha Kapoor
Indian Telly Awards	Best Actress	Anita Hassanandani
