= Bigg Boss (Hindi TV series) season 20 =

Bigg Boss
- Season 20
- Presented by: Salman Khan
- No. of days: 76
- No. of housemates: 18
- No. of episodes: 77

Release
- Original network: JioHotstar; Colors TV
- Original release: 6 September 2026 – present

Series chronology
- ← Previous; Season 19

Bigg Boss 20, also known as Bigg Boss: Tathas-two, is the twentieth season of the Indian Hindi-language reality television series Bigg Boss. It premiered on 6 September 2026 on Colors TV and streams digitally on JioHotstar. Salman Khan is hosting the show for the seventeenth consecutive season.

Rohit Shetty guest hosted the Weekend Ka Vaar for the seventh week in Khan's absence.

== Production ==
=== Development and theme ===
The season's tagline is “Tathas-two”, introducing a “vardaan” that gives contestants a second chance in the game. The concept is built around the English wordplay “that's two”.

=== Promotions and release ===
On 20 July 2026, JioHotstar announced that the twentieth season of Bigg Boss Hindi, hosted by Salman Khan, would premiere in September 2026 on Colors TV and JioHotstar as part of a network initiative to air six Bigg Boss regional editions simultaneously.

The official first look and logo were unveiled on 21 July 2026. This was followed by a series of teasers released in early August 2026, which confirmed the 6 September 2026 premiere date and introduced the season's “Tathas-two” theme. A full-length trailer expanding on the gameplay mechanics was released on 12 August 2026.

On 4 September 2026, JioHotstar and Colors TV released promotional clips featuring confirmed contestants Isha Rikhi and Kanika Mann. On 5 September 2026, a teaser featuring rapper Yung DSA was released, in which he performed his song Yeda Yung. On the same day, actor-politician Manoj Tiwari appeared alongside his daughter Rhiti Tiwari in a promotional segment to introduce her as a contestant.

=== Casting ===
On 25 August 2026, JioHotstar and Colors TV announced the return of the audience-voting initiative Fans Ka Faisla (Fans' Decision), previously used in the nineteenth season. Through the JioHotstar app, viewers were given the opportunity to vote for one of two potential contestants to enter the house prior to the premiere. The voting period was scheduled from 25 August to 2 September 2026. The two candidates were Punjabi actress Love Gill and Model Rhiya Ahir.

=== Eye logo ===
The season's logo features a stylized eye with a multicolored geometric iris (in shades of purple, blue, red, orange, and teal) converging on a golden center. It is accompanied by a metallic gold outline and a matching "Bigg Boss" wordmark. According to the network, the design is intended to reflect the season's "Tathas-two" theme, symbolizing manifestation and destiny.

=== Broadcast ===
Following the release strategy of the previous season, the show prioritizes digital streaming, with daily episodes airing on JioHotstar at 9:00 pm IST, followed by a television broadcast on Colors TV at 10:30 pm IST.

=== House ===
The House featured a colourful "Wonderland" theme inspired by the concept of duality, incorporating surrealist fantasy and animal-inspired elements throughout. Designed by Varsha Jain, the house covers approximately 10,000 square feet and features 104 cameras.

- Living area: Features a large central sofa, a 12-seater dining table, parachute-inspired seating, and a pink teapot installation used as a throne.
- Kitchen: Designed as the "BB Food Truck", featuring a food-truck-inspired kitchen setup.
- Bedroom: Contains 17 beds, with animal-inspired decorations including a scorpion and chameleon, along with mushroom-shaped wall elements.
- Bathroom: Features an upside-down neon-pink rabbit installation, seating areas, and suspended chimpanzee decorations.
- Garden/Outdoor area: Features a shark-themed swimming pool, a floral tap installation, a snake-wrapped tree used as seating, and various animal sculptures.
- Room 20: A new room introduced for the twentieth season, replacing the Assembly Room from the previous season. This is the Wall of Fame of the Bigg Boss house, a room containing photos of all the contestants. Initially, each contestant's photo is displayed in split faces. After a contestant loses their lifeline, any contestant flips their photo, revealing a single, complete picture of the contestant.
- Room 2X: A mysterious room featuring two differently sized doors; the room were mostly used to either take 1 lifeline from one or multiple contestants by pressing the X Buzzer or give 1 lifeline to a contestant which has single lifeline by pressing the 2 number buzzer.

Additional features include numerous three-dimensional animal and fantasy-inspired installations, with recurring eye motifs representing Bigg Boss's surveillance.

== Housemates status ==
Sr.	Contestant	Day entered	Day exited	Status
1	Aamrapali	Day 0		
2	Arishfa	Day 0		
3	Gullu	Day 0		
4	Kanika	Day 0		
5	Mahhi	Day 0		
6	Love	Day 0		
7	Qazi	Day 0		
8	Scout	Day 0		Nominated (Note: On Day 66, following the physical assault on Yung DSA, Bigg Boss punished Scout by nominating him for the entire season.)
9	Uditi	Day 0		House Captain
10	Yung	Day 0		
11	Manish	Day 35	Day 78	Walked
12	Aasif	Day 0	Day 56	Evicted
13	Mary	Day 0	Day 49	Evicted
14	Aman	Day 0	Day 42	Evicted
15	Nakul	Day 35	Day 38	Ejected
16	Rhiti	Day 0	Day 26	Evicted by Housemates (Note: Rhiti was evicted by captaincy nominees Mahhi, Uditi and Yung.)
17	Isha	Day 0	Day 21	Evicted
18	Rohed	Day 0	Day 14	Evicted

== Housemates ==
The following housemates entered the house in order:

=== Original entrants ===
- Kanika Mann – Actress known for Guddan Tumse Na Ho Payega, Fear Factor Khatron ke Khiladi 12 and Naagin 7.
- Aasif Khan – Actor known for Panchayat.
- Qazi Ahmad Touqeer – Singer known for Fame Gurukul.
- Isha Rikhi – Actress and ex-wife of rapper Badshah.
- Aamrapali Dubey – Actress primarily known for her work in Bhojpuri cinema.
- Rohed Khan – Model and actor.
- Lovepreet Kaur Gill – Actress known for her work in Punjabi cinema.
- Yung DSA – Rapper known for his track "Yeda Yung".
- Mary Kom – Retired amateur boxer and former Member of Parliament. Known for her achievements in boxing, including winning a bronze medal at the 2012 Summer Olympics.
- Tanmay "Sc0utOP" Singh – E-sports player and streamer.
- Arishfa Khan – Actress and social media influencer.
- Kushal "Gullu" Tanwar – Reality show personality known for Roadies XX, Splitsvilla X6 and Maa Hai Na.
- Aman Gandhi – Actor known for Bhagya Lakshmi and Kyunki Rishton Ke Bhi Roop Badalte Hain.
- Uditi Singh – Actress.
- Rhiti Tiwari – Singer, songwriter and daughter of Bigg Boss 4 contestant Manoj Tiwari.
- Mahhi Vij – Actress known for Laagi Tujhse Lagan and Seher – Hone Ko Hai. She is also known for Jhalak Dikhlaa Jaa 4, Nach Baliye 5 and Khatron Ke Khiladi 7.

=== Wild card entrants ===
- Manish Goel - Actor known for his roles in popular daily soaps including Kahaani Ghar Ghar Kii, Kasautii Zindagii Kay, Bhabhi and Anupamaa. He is also known for Nach Baliye 1 and Welcome – Baazi Mehmaan Nawazi Ki.
- Nakul Dhull - Social media personality.

== Twists ==
=== Fans Ka Faisla ===
On 25 August 2026, JioHotstar and Colors TV announced the return of the Fans Ka Faisla campaign, previously introduced in the nineteenth season, allowing viewers to select one housemate between Rhiya Ahir and Love Gill via the JioHotstar app from 25 August to 2 September 2026.

At the grand premiere, host Salman Khan declared that Love Gill was selected to enter the house, while Rhiya Ahir was eliminated.

=== Tathas-two ===
Each housemate entered the season with two lives, losing one life (trans. Jeevandan) upon eviction or through various twists.

Week	Contestant	Lives	Notes
Week 1	Kanika	1 ▼	Taken away by House Captain Yung DSA.
Week 1	Uditi	1 ▼	Evicted via Public votes and lost her lifeline.
Week 2	Aasif Rohed Scout	1 ▼	Lost their lifelines after Mahhi, Kanika and Gullu respectively took them to compete for the captaincy.
Week 3	Yung DSA	1 ▼	Taken by Aman to avail luxury ration for himself.
Week 3	Isha Rhiti	1 ▼	Lost their lifeline following finishing in BTM2 in housemates with two lives ranking challenge.
Week 4	Mary	1 ▼	Evicted via Public votes and lost her lifeline.
Week 4	Kanika Uditi	2 ▲	House Captain Gullu chose to restore Kanika and Uditi lifeline and took 80/100% ration.
Week 5	Aman	1 ▼	Evicted via Public votes and lost his lifeline.
Week 6	Arishfa	1 ▼	Taken away by the majority of 6/13 housemates in exchange for weekly ration.
Week 7	Manish	1 ▼	Evicted via Public votes and lost his lifeline.
Week 8			
Week 9	Gullu	1 ▼	Gave up his lifeline to give Kanika her family photo and cassette tape.
Week 9	Uditi	1 ▼	Gave up her lifeline to give Manish his family photo and cassette tape.
Week 9	Kanika	1 ▼	Gave up her lifeline to give Yung DSA his family photo and cassette tape.
Week 9	Aamrapali	1 ▼	Gave up her lifeline to give Gullu his family photo and cassette tape.
Week 9	Love	1 ▼	Gave up her lifeline to give Scout his family photo and cassette tape.
Week 9	Qazi	1 ▼	Gave up his lifeline to give Mahhi her family photo and cassette tape.
Week 10	Mahhi	1 ▼	Evicted via Public votes and lost her lifeline.
Week 11			

== Weekly summary ==
Week 1	Entrances	At the Grand Premiere on 6 September 2026, host Salman Khan introduced the housemates.
Week 1	Twists	Upon entering the house, Kanika was asked by Bigg Boss to observe the housemates and select the one she disliked the most. On Day 2, when asked by Bigg Boss, she chose Qazi, who was subsequently barred from participating in the captaincy task.; On Day 3, Bigg Boss asked the contenders for captaincy, Aasif, Gullu and Yung DSA, to name a housemate whose lifeline they would want to take if they became Captain. They chose Arishfa, Uditi, and Kanika respectively.
Week 1	Nominations	Arishfa, Kanika, Love and Uditi were nominated for the first week eviction.
Week 1	House captain	None
Week 1	Tasks	Nomination Task: On Day 3, housemates were asked to nominate two other housemates for the upcoming eviction.; Happy Birthday, Bigg Boss: On Day 2, the contestants became pieces of a cake structure. When the buzzer sounded, they had to sit on the plate while a birthday song was played. Once the song ended, they had to return to the cake structure and align themselves in the empty cells. The last three housemates to return were eliminated from each round. Three housemates were to be selected as nominees for House Captain. Qazi could not participate in the task & became the coordinator.; Bigg Boss Movie Theatre Captaincy Task: On Day 4, the captaincy contenders, Aasif, Gullu, and Yung DSA, were seated on the movie theatre chairs with popcorn buckets placed in front of them with Mahhi as the coordinator of the task. The remaining housemates had to collect popcorn in the popcorn boxes placed on their heads from the popcorn machine when the task began and put them into the bucket of the contender they wanted to make the Captain. The contenders also had to protect their buckets from the other housemates.
Week 1	Results	Happy Birthday, Bigg Boss: Aasif, Gullu and Yung DSA won the task and became contenders for next week's captaincy.; Bigg Boss Movie Theatre Captaincy Task: Yung DSA won the task and became the first Captain.
Week 1	Exits	Rhiya Ahir, not selected via Fans Ka Faisla, was evicted on Grand Premiere.; On Day 6, Uditi Singh was evicted through public voting and lost her lifeline.
Week 2
Week 2	Nominations	Aasif, Rohed and Scout were nominated for the second week eviction.
Week 2	House captain	Yung DSA
Week 2	Tasks	Nomination Task: On Day 8, housemates were asked to nominate two other housemates. Following weekly nomination activity, Bigg Boss cancelled the housemates nominations and directly nominated Aasif, Rohed and Scout for violating house rules by discussing the nominations.; Captaincy Task: On Day 11, Gullu, Kanika and Mahhi competed in the captaincy task.
Week 2	Results	Captaincy Task: Gullu won the task and became the Captain.
Week 2	Exits	On Day 14, Rohed Khan was evicted after facing public vote.
Week 3
Week 3	Nominations	Yung DSA and Isha were nominated for the third week eviction.
Week 3	House Captain	Kushal "Gullu" Tanwar
Week 3	Tasks	Nomination Task: Housemates have to name two housemates whom they wanted to save from eviction.; Captaincy Task: Gullu, Love, Mary and Rhiti competed for the captaincy.
Week 3	Results	Nomination Task: Yung DSA and Isha were the least saved contestants and became nominated for the eviction.; Captaincy Task: Gullu won the task and became the Captain.
Week 3	Exits	On Day 21, Isha Rikhi was evicted after facing public vote.
Week 4	Twists	On Day 22, the doors of the 2X Room were opened, granting Captain Gullu the power to use the Jeevandan twist. Where he was presented with the 4 options: Sr. / Task; 1 / Give one lifeline to Kanika and Uditi with 80% ration; 2 / Give one Lifeline to Aasif and Scout with 80% ration; 3 / Give one lifeline to Rhiti and Yung DSA with 80% ration; 4 / Get 120% ration for the house; He chose to restore the lifeline of Kanika Mann and Uditi Singh and get 80% ration.
Week 4	Nominations	Amrapali, Aman, Kanika, Love, Mahhi, Mary, Qazi, Rhiti, Scout, Uditi and Yung DSA were nominated for the fourth week eviction.
Week 4	House Captain	Kushal "Gullu" Tanwar
Week 4	Tasks	Mission Ration, Phir Captain: The garden area contained packets with names of various grocery items which female contestants would have to grab in pairs and keep them in the basket while other contestants would try to sabotage. At the sound of buzzer, the duo with the most grocery packets would become contenders for next captaincy.; Sr. / Pairs; 1 / Love and Rhiti; 2 / Kanika and Mary; 3 / Mahhi and Uditi; 4 / Arishfa and Amrapali; Winners: Round 1 / Love and Rhiti; Round 2 / Mahhi and Uditi; Round 3 / Mahhi and Uditi
Week 4	Exits	On Day 26, Rhiti Tiwari was evicted after captaincy contenders Yung DSA, Mahhi and Uditi's consensual decision.
Week 4	Exits	On Day 28, Mary Kom was evicted through public voting and lost her lifeline.
Week 5	Twists	Following the nomination task, Captain Uditi was given the power to directly nominate one housemate and chose Mary Kom, citing her lack of involvement in the game.
Week 5	Nominations	Qazi, Mahhi, Kanika, Aman, Love, Arishfa, Mary and Gullu were nominated for the fifth week eviction.
Week 5	House captain	Uditi Singh
Week 5	Tasks	Nomination Task: Housemates nominated contestants while Mary Kom punched the corresponding pictures in the boxing ring.; On Day 30, Aasif was called to the Confession Room and offered an opportunity to become a contender for captaincy by taking on a special task as the House's news anchor.; Captaincy Contendership Task: On Day 31, Aasif Khan hosted a newsroom-style debate named Debate with Aasif. Housemates debated various statements concerning other contestants.; Ration Task: On Day 32, the captaincy contenders were given an opportunity to steal ration for themselves. Yung DSA, Aasif and Love took turns as the "thief". Love chose to sacrifice a large portion of the available ration for the house.; Captaincy Task: On Day 33, Love was given the power to rank the captaincy contenders according to her preferences. She placed Kanika Mann at the bottom of the rankings and herself at the top. Love subsequently selected Aasif Khan as the new captain of the house.
Week 5	Sponsored	On Day 30, Bigg Boss announced the Style Icon task, in which Uditi and Qazi emerged as the winners. The housemates subsequently received clothes through the Flipkart board.
Week 5	Results	Captaincy Contendership Task: Kanika, Love, Arishfa, Uditi, Scout and Yung DSA emerged as contenders through the debates, while Aasif Khan was subsequently given direct captaincy contendership.; Captaincy Task: Aasif won the ranking by Love, becoming the next Captain and decided that the housemates would receive 25% of their weekly ration.
Week 5	Exits	On Day 35, Aman Gandhi was evicted through public voting and lost his lifeline.
Week 6	Entrances	On Day 35, Manish Goel and Nakul Dhull entered as first and second wildcard contestants respectively.
Week 6	Nominations	Aman, Arishfa, Kanika, Gullu, Love, Mahhi, Mary, Qazi, Scout, Uditi and Yung DSA were nominated following the week’s nomination process.
Week 6	House captain	Aasif Khan
Week 6	Tasks	Nomination and captaincy tasks.
Week 6	Exits	On Day 38, Nakul Dhull was removed from the house due to physical altercations with fellow contestant, Gullu. On Day 42, Aman Gandhi was evicted through public voting.
Week 7	Twists	Captain Scout received the power to nominate one contestant directly. He chose to nominate Uditi.
Week 7	Nominations	Amrapali Dubey, Manish Goel, Arishfa Khan, Love Gill, Gullu, Mary Kom and Uditi Singh.
Week 7	House captain	Tanmay "Sc0utOP" Singh
Week 7	Tasks	On Day 43, housemates identified contestants they considered boring and losers. The nomination task led to seven contestants being nominated.: Captaincy Contendership Task; Captaincy Task
Week 7	Exits	On Day 48, Mary Kom was evicted through public voting.
Week 8	Twists	
Week 8	Nominations	
Week 8	House captain	Mahhi Vij
Week 8	Tasks	
Week 8	Sponsors	
Week 8	Exits	On Day 56, Aasif Khan was evicted through public voting.
Week 9	Twists	
Week 9	Nominations	
Week 9	House captain	Kanika Mann
Week 9	Tasks	
Week 9	Sponsors	
Week 9	Exits	On Weekend ka vaar Salman Khan announced no eviction due to Diwali.
Week 10	Twists	
Week 10	Nominations	
Week 10	House captain	Arishfa Khan
Week 10	Tasks	
Week 10	Sponsors	
Week 10	Exits	On Day 70 Mahhi vij was evicted via public voting and lost her lifeline.
Week 11	Twists	
Week 11	Nominations	Love Gill, Gullu, Manish Goel,Mahhi Vijj, Amrapali Dubey,Yung Dsa,Qazi, Scout, Kanika Mann
Week 11	House captain	Uditi Singh
Week 11	Tasks	
Week 11	Sponsors	
Week 11	Exits	
Week 12	Twists	
Week 12	Nominations	
Week 12	House captain	
Week 12	Tasks	
Week 12	Sponsors	
Week 12	Exits	
Week 13	Twists	
Week 13	Nominations	
Week 13	House captain	
Week 13	Tasks	
Week 13	Sponsors	
Week 13	Exits	
Week 14	Twists	
Week 14	Nominations	
Week 14	House captain	
Week 14	Tasks	
Week 14	Sponsors	
Week 14	Exits	
Week 15 FINALE	Twists	
Week 15 FINALE	Nominations	
Week 15 FINALE	House captain	
Week 15 FINALE	Tasks	
Week 15 FINALE	Sponsors	
Week 15 FINALE	Exits	

== Nominations table ==
#BB20	Week 1		Week 2		Week 3	Week 4		Week 5	Week 6	Week 7	Week 8	Week 9	Week 10	Week 11	Week 12	Week 13	Week 14	Week 15	
#BB20	Grand Premiere	Day 3	Week 2		Week 3	Week 4		Week 5	Week 6	Week 7	Week 8	Week 9	Week 10	Week 11	Week 12	Week 13	Week 14	Day 102	Grand Finale; Day 105
Nominees for House Captain	Not; Introduced		Aasif; Gullu; Yung DSA		Gullu; Kanika; Mahhi; ~~Rhiti~~	~~Aasif~~; ~~Aamrapali~~; Gullu; Love; Mary; Rhiti; ~~Scout~~; ~~Yung DSA~~		~~Gullu~~; Mahhi; Uditi; Yung DSA	Aasif; Arishfa; Kanika; Love; Scout; Uditi; Yung DSA	Aman; Aamrapali; Arishfa; Kanika; Love; Mahhi; Mary; Qazi; Scout	Aasif; Aamrapali; Kanika; Love; Mahhi; Manish; Mary	Aasif; Aamrapali; Arishfa; Gullu; Kanika; Love; ~~Mahhi~~; Manish; Qazi; Scout; Uditi; Yung DSA	None	None (Task; Cancelled)	Uditi				
House Captain	Not; Introduced		Yung DSA		Gullu			Uditi	Aasif	Scout	Mahhi	Kanika	~~Arishfa~~ (Captain Dismissed)	None (Task; Cancelled)	Uditi				
Captain's Nominations	Not; Introduced		Kanika (to take lifeline)	Not eligible	Not eligible	Kanika; Uditi (to give lifeline)	Not eligible	Mary (to evict)	Mahhi (to evict)	Uditi (to evict)	Aamrapali; Love; Aasif; Manish; Kanika; Arishfa (to evict); Qazi; Gullu; Uditi; Scout; Yung DSA (to save)	Mahhi (to evict)	Scout (to evict)	None (Task; Cancelled)	Arishfa (most favourite); Love (least favourite)				
Vote to	None	Evict		None	Save	Evict/Save	Take Lifeline	Evict			Evict/Save	Evict							
Aamrapali	No; Vote	Gullu; Kanika	Arishfa; Mahhi	Not eligible	Love; Rhiti	Aamrapali; Rhiti (to evict)	Not eligible	Aman; Qazi	Kanika; Gullu	Manish; Gullu	Scout; Love; Aasif; Yung DSA (to save)	Arishfa	Gullu; Mahhi; Kanika	Love; Gullu; Kanika					
Arishfa	No; Vote	Mahhi; Aamrapali	Aamrapali; Love	Not eligible	Qazi; Mahhi	Mahhi (to evict); Arishfa (to save)	Not eligible	Gullu; Kanika	Kanika; Gullu; Qazi; Mary	Manish; Love	Aamrapali; Love (to evict); Uditi; Manish (to save)	Scout	~~House Captain~~	Mahhi; Love; Gullu; Aamrapali; Kanika					
Gullu	No; Vote	Aamrapali; Love	Scout; Rohed	Not eligible	House Captain			Yung DSA; Aman	Arishfa	Aamrapali; Arishfa	Arishfa; Aasif; Arishfa; Uditi (to evict); Kanika; Scout (to save)	Not eligible	Aamrapali; Mahhi	Mahhi; Qazi; Yung DSA; Aamrapali					
Kanika	No; Vote	Arishfa; Love	Uditi; Scout	Not eligible	Qazi; Mary	Aman; Kanika (to evict)	Not eligible	Qazi; Arishfa	Aman; Love; Uditi; Arishfa; Yung DSA	Aamrapali; Arishfa	Gullu; Yung DSA (to save)	House Captain	Mahhi; Aamrapali; Qazi	Mahhi; Qazi; Aamrapali					
Love	Selected (Fans Ka Faisla)	Gullu; Kanika	Mahhi; Arishfa	Not eligible	Aasif; Aamrapali	Love; Mary; Yung DSA (to evict)	Not eligible	Aman; Mahhi	Kanika	Manish; Arishfa	Scout; Aasif; Yung DSA; Aamrapali (to save)	Not eligible	Yung DSA; Uditi; Mahhi	Uditi; Mahhi; Qazi; Arishfa; Yung DSA; Aamrapali					
Mahhi	No; Vote	Arishfa; Uditi	Aamrapali; Love	Not eligible	Arishfa; Qazi	Mahhi (to evict); Arishfa (to save)	Rhiti	Aman; Arishfa	Uditi	Aamrapali; Arishfa	House Captain	Aamrapali	Aamrapali; Uditi; Arishfa	Love; Gullu; Manish; Kanika					
Qazi	No; Vote	Yung DSA; Kanika	Aamrapali; Isha	Not eligible	Arishfa; Mahhi	Qazi; Uditi (to evict)	Not eligible	Love; Kanika	Scout; Uditi; Arishfa; Yung DSA	Aamrapali; Arishfa	Aasif; Yung DSA (to evict); Love; Arishfa (to save)	Not eligible	Manish	Love; Gullu; Manish; Kanika					
Scout	No; Vote	Uditi; Arishfa	Uditi; Aman	Nominated	Love; Aasif	Scout (to evict); Aasif (to save)	Not eligible	Qazi; Mahhi	Qazi	House Captain	Arishfa; Manish; Love (to evict); Aasif (to save)	Uditi	Uditi; Aamrapali	Arishfa					
Uditi	No; Vote	Love; Aasif	Aasif; Rhiti	Not eligible	Qazi; Aman	Qazi; Uditi (to evict)	Rhiti	House Captain	Scout; Mary; Yung DSA	Mary; Mary	Aasif; Scout (to evict); Arishfa; Qazi; Love; Aamrapali (to save)	Manish	Mahhi; Love	Love	House Captain				
Yung DSA	No; Vote	Love; Arishfa	Aman; Kanika	House Captain	Love; Aamrapali	Love; Mary; Yung DSA (to evict)	Rhiti	Gullu; Mahhi	Kanika; Uditi; Qazi	Manish; Arishfa	Gullu; Qazi; Arishfa; Kanika (to evict); Aamrapali; Love (to save)	Not eligible	Mahhi; Love; Qazi	Love; Gullu; Kanika					
Manish	Not in house								Did not vote	Aamrapali; Arishfa	Scout (to evict); Aasif; Gullu; Yung DSA (to save)	Did not vote	Qazi	Mahhi	Walked (Day 77)				
Aasif	No; Vote	Kanika; Uditi	Aman; Uditi	Nominated	Scout; Love	Scout (to evict); Aasif (to save)	Not eligible	Love; Kanika	House Captain	Qazi; Arishfa	Qazi; Uditi; Arishfa (to evict); Yung DSA (to save)	Evicted (Day 56)							
Mary	No; Vote	Arishfa; Gullu	Rohed; Rhiti	Not eligible	Aamrapali; Love	Love; Mary; Yung DSA (to evict)	Not eligible	Mahhi; Qazi	Did not vote	Arishfa; Arishfa	Evicted (Day 49)								
Aman	No; Vote	Love; Aamrapali	Aasif; Love	Not eligible	Uditi; Qazi	Aman; Kanika (to evict)	Not eligible	Qazi; Love	Scout	Evicted (Day 42)									
Nakul	Not in house								Did not vote	Ejected (Day 38)									
Rhiti	No; Vote	Uditi; Mary	Qazi; Uditi	Not eligible	Aamrapali; Mary	Aamrapali; Rhiti (to evict)	Evicted by Mahhi, Uditi, and Yung DSA (Day 26)												
Isha	No; Vote	Scout; Qazi	Uditi; Qazi	Not eligible	Kanika; Arishfa	Evicted (Day 21)													
Rohed	No; Vote	Kanika; Love	Aman; Gullu	Nominated	Evicted (Day 14)														
Rhiya	Not selected (Day 0)																		
Notes	1	2	3 4		5 6	7 8 9		10 11	12	13	14	15	16 17 18	19 20 21					
Against Public Vote	Love; Rhiya	Arishfa; Kanika; Love; Uditi	~~Aman~~; ~~Aamrapali~~; ~~Love~~; ~~Uditi~~	Aasif; Rohed; Scout	Isha; Yung DSA	Aman; Aamrapali; Kanika; Love; Mahhi; Mary; Qazi; ~~Rhiti~~; Scout; Uditi; Yung DSA		Aman; Arishfa; Gullu; Kanika; Love; Mahhi; Mary; Qazi	Aman; Arishfa; Gullu; Kanika; Love; Mahhi; Mary; Qazi; Scout; Uditi; Yung DSA	Aamrapali; Arishfa; Gullu; Love; Manish; Mary; Uditi	Aasif; Aamrapali; Gullu; Kanika; Love; Scout	Aamrapali; Arishfa; Mahhi; Manish; Scout; Uditi	Aamrapali; Gullu; Kanika; Love; Manish; Mahhi; Qazi; Scout; Uditi; Yung DSA	Aamrapali; ~~Arishfa~~; Gullu; Kanika; Love; Manish; Mahhi; Qazi; Scout; Yung DSA					
Evicted	Rhiya	~~Uditi~~	Rohed		Isha	Rhiti		~~Aman~~	Nakul	~~Manish~~ Mary	Aasif	No; Eviction	~~Mahhi~~	Manish					
Evicted	Rhiya	~~Uditi~~	Rohed		Isha	~~Mary~~		~~Aman~~	Aman	~~Manish~~ Mary	Aasif	No; Eviction	~~Mahhi~~	Manish					

indicates the house captain.
indicates that the housemate was directly nominated for eviction prior weekly nominations.
indicates that the housemate was immune from nominations.
indicates the contestant has been evicted.
indicates that housemate was evicted by other housemates' votes.
indicates that housemate was ejected from the house.
indicates the winner.
indicates the first runner-up.
indicates the second runner-up.
indicates the third runner-up.
indicates the fourth runner-up.

=== Nomination notes ===
- ^1: The Fans Ka Faisla campaign allowed viewers to select one housemate between Rhiya Ahir and Love Gill via the JioHotstar app from 25 August to 2 September 2026. At the grand premiere, host Salman Khan declared that Love Gill was selected to enter the house, while Rhiya Ahir was eliminated.
- ^2: On Day 6, Uditi was evicted through public voting and lost her lifeline.
- ^3: On Day 8, following weekly nomination activity, Bigg Boss cancelled the housemates nominations and directly nominated Aasif, Rohed and Scout for violating house rules by discussing the nominations.
- ^4: On Day 11, Aasif, Rohed and Scout lost their lifelines after Kanika, Gullu and Mahhi respectively took them to compete for the captaincy. Meanwhile, Rhiti failed, resulting in the cancellation of her captaincy nomination.
- ^5: On Day 15, Aman took Yung DSA’s lifeline to avail luxury ration for himself.
- ^6: On Day 16, Isha and Rhiti lost their lifeline after finishing in the bottom two in the ranking activity among housemates with lifelines.
- ^7: On Day 18, Aasif’s captaincy nomination cancelled after receiving most rejection by housemates. Furthermore, the remaining nominees except Gullu had to mutually give three names for upcoming captaincy. They choose Mary, Love and Rhiti.
- ^8: On Day 26, Rhiti was evicted by captaincy nominees Mahhi, Uditi and Yung DSA.
- ^9: On Day 28, Mary was evicted through public voting and lost her lifeline.
- ^10: On Day 32, Gullu’s captaincy nomination were cancelled by majority of housemates.
- ^11: On Day 35, Aman was evicted through public voting and lost his lifeline.
- ^12: On Day 38, Nakul was ejected due to physical violence against Gullu.
- ^13: On Day 49, Manish was evicted through public voting and lost his lifeline.
- ^14: On Day 51, House Captain Mahhi was given the power to place housemates (evict/save) on a Ludo board as part of the weekly nomination process. She then spun a dice wheel and invited a housemate per turn to swap the positions of other housemates on the board.
- ^15: On Day 52, Mahhi’s captaincy nomination cancelled after receiving most rejection by housemates.
- ^16: On Day 65, Bigg Boss removed Arishfa from captaincy a day before her tenure after most housemates were seen violating the rules by sleeping. She was also barred from participating in the next week’s captaincy task.
- ^17: On Day 66, following the physical assault on Yung DSA, Bigg Boss punished Scout by nominating him for the entire season, permanently disqualifying him from becoming captain, barring him from receiving any special powers (such as a lifeline), and making him liable for immediate eviction for any further violation of house rules.
- ^18: On Day 70, Mahhi was evicted through Public voting and lost her lifeline.
- ^19: On Day 73, Bigg Boss cancelled the captaincy task after Uditi sustained an injury due to the task setup, citing concerns for the housemates health and safety.
- ^20: On Day 74, another task was held among the remaining housemates to determine the second nominee for captaincy. However, Bigg Boss cancelled the task after the housemates failed to complete it according to the rules, and Uditi, being the only nominee through prior captaincy task, directly became the house captain.
- ^21: On Day 75, Bigg Boss asked the house captain, Uditi, to name her most and least favourite housemates. She named Arishfa and Love, respectively. Both competed in a task to secure immunity from nomination, in which Arishfa emerged victorious and had her nomination cancelled.

== Guest appearances ==
Week(s)	Day(s)	Guest(s)	Notes	Ref.
Week 1	Grand Premiere	Dinesh Lal Yadav	To support Amrapali Dubey	
Week 1	Grand Premiere	Manoj Tiwari	To introduce his daughter Rhiti Tiwari	
Week 1	Grand Premiere	Rechungvar Kom and Khupneivar Kom	To support their mother Mary Kom	
Week 1	Grand Premiere	Priyanka Chopra Jonas	To support Mary Kom via video	
Week 1	Grand Premiere	CarryMinati, Abhishek Malhan, Elvish Yadav	To support Tanmay "Sc0utOP" Singh via video	
Week 2	Day 14	Munawar Faruqui, Sonali Bendre, Arjun Bijlani, Neha Swami, Rahul Vaidya and Disha Parmar	To promote Dhammal with Pati Patni Aur Panga – Jodiyon Ka Reality Check season 2	
Week 2	Day 14	Siddharth Malhotra and Tamannaah Bhatia	To promote their film The Vvaan: Force of the Forrest	
Week 3	Day 21	Ajay Devgn and Jaideep Ahlawat	To promote their film Drishyam: The Conclusion	
Week 3	Day 21	Fatima Sana Shaikh, Raghubir Yadav and Mohammed Zeeshan Ayyub	To promote their series Hunkkaar	
Week 4	Day 28	Ayushmann Khurana and Sara Ali Khan	To promote their film Udta Teer	
Week 4	Day 28	Mika Singh	To entertain housemates	
Week 4	Day 28	Asha Negi and Abhay Mahajan	To promote their show Ali Baba aur 40 Bhoot	
Week 5	Day 35	Rannvijay Singha, Prince Narula, Neha Dhupia and Abhishek Malhan	To promote Roadies Rebirth	
Week 5	Day 35	Rajkummar Rao and Wamiqa Gabbi	To promote their film Prahaar: The Untold Story Of Ujjwal Nikam	
Week 7	Day 49	Rohit Shetty	To host the show in absence of Salman Khan	
Week 7	Day 49	Sonakshi Sinha and Zaheer Iqbal	To promote their film Tu Hai Meri Kiran	
Week 7	Day 49	Farrhana Bhatt	To promote her song Sahiba	
Week 7	Day 49	Kaashvi Hiranandani	To interact with Tanmay "Sc0utOP" Singh	
Week 8	Day 56	Elvish Yadav	To promote his show Rizz Master	
Week 9	Day 62	Gaurav Gupta	To Roast the Housemates	
Week 9	Day 62	Karan Johar	To promote his show Koffee with Karan season 9	
Week 9	Day 62	Adel Sajan and Dr. Sana Sajan	To promote Shahrukhz by Danube Properties	
Week 9	Day 62	Shanaya Kapoor	To promote her series Student of the Year - After Dark	
Week 9	Day 63	Harrdy Sandhu and Mohit Chauhan	To promote their songs Tuu and Shimle respectively	
Week 9	Day 64	Jasmine Sandlas	To perform her concert on Diwali	
Week 11	Day 76	Manu Punjabi	To ask Housemates Questions via video	
Week 11	Day 76	Shagufta "XYAA" Iqbal (Scout’s friend)	To ask Housemates Questions via video	
Week 11	Day 76	Elvish Yadav (Gullu’s friend)	To ask Housemates Questions via video	
Week 11	Day 76	Riar Saab (Yung DSA’s friend)	To ask Housemates Questions via video	
Week 11	Day 76	Sambata (Yung DSA’s friend)	To ask Housemates Questions via video	
Week 11	Day 76	Samarth Jurel (Kanika’s friend)	To ask Housemates Questions via video	
Week 11	Day 76	Karan Wahi (Kanika’s friend)	To ask Housemates Questions via video	
Week 11	Day 76	Dinesh Lal Yadav (Aamrapali’s friend)	To ask Housemates Questions via video	
Week 11	Day 77	Kanan Tandi	To decode the housemates’ expressions through clips	

== Reception ==
=== Opening ===
The season had the most successful debut for a reality show on the streaming service JioHotstar.
