= Aman Gandhi (actor) =

Indian television actor (born 1993)

- Born: 19 February 1993 (age 33); Delhi, India
- Occupation: Actor
- Years active: 2016–present
- Notable work: Naagin 3; Bhagya Lakshmi; Kyunki Saas Bhi Kabhi Bahu Thi 2; Kyunki Rishton Ke Bhi Roop Badalte Hain
- Partner(s): Shagun Sharma (2025–2026)

Aman Gandhi (born 19 February 1993) is an Indian television actor, best known for his roles in Naagin 3, Bhagya Lakshmi and Kyunki Saas Bhi Kabhi Bahu Thi 2 and its spin-off, Kyunki Rishton Ke Bhi Roop Badalte Hain. In 2026, he participated in Bigg Boss season 20.

== Early life ==
Gandhi is a native of Delhi. He shifted to Mumbai in October 2015. Following his graduation, he was initially working at a global automobile company as an assistant manager, but left his job to pursue his acting dreams.

== Personal life ==
In 2025, Gandhi's onscreen sister from Kyunki.. portrayed by Shagun Sharma revealed that they are dating each other much before joining the show. During inside the Bigg Boss 20 house, Gandhi confessed that they were broke up in September 2026.

== Career ==
He made his debut with a dancing role in D4 - Get Up and Dance (2016). He then did cameo roles in Pyaar Tune Kya Kiya, Kuch Rang Pyar Ke Aise Bhi, Sasural Simar Ka, Gudiya Hamari Sabhi Pe Bhari and Kundali Bhagya.

Gandhi's first major role came as Daksh Munshi, one of the antagonists, in Naagin 3 (2018). He subsequently played Veer Singh Chauhan in Daayan (2018–19) and Shikhar Shastri in Prem Bandhan (2021). From August 2021 to June 2025, he rose to prominence playing Ayushmaan "Ayush" Chopra in Bhagya Lakshmi.

Since July 2025, he is seen playing a second generation lead, Hrithik Virani, in iconic Kyunki Saas Bhi Kabhi Bahu Thi 2. From March to August 2026 he reprised his role in its spin-off, Kyunki Rishton Ke Bhi Roop Badalte Hain.

In September 2026, he was seen as a contestant in Colors's reality series Bigg Boss season 20. On 17 October, he was eliminated in the season's fifth elimination, finishing in 14th place.

== Filmography ==
=== Television ===
Year	Title	Role	Notes	Ref(s)
2016	D4 - Get Up and Dance	Nikhil		
2016	Kuch Rang Pyar Ke Aise Bhi	Sameer	Season 1	
2018	Naagin 3	Daksh Munshi		
2018	Kundali Bhagya	Ritvik		
2018–2019	Daayan	Veer Singh Chauhan		
2020	Gudiya Hamari Sabhi Pe Bhari	Gabbar		
2021	Prem Bandhan	Shikhar Shastri		
2021–2025	Bhagya Lakshmi	Ayushmaan "Ayush" Chopra		
2022–2023	Parineetii	Vishal		
2025–2026	Kyunki Saas Bhi Kabhi Bahu Thi 2	Hrithik Virani		
2026	Kyunki Rishton Ke Bhi Roop Badalte Hain	Hrithik Virani		
2026	Bigg Boss 20	Contestant	14th place	
