= Affan Khan =

Indian television child actor (born 2007)

- Born: Affan Jameel Khan; 27 October 2007 (age 18); Bangalore, India
- Occupation: Actor
- Years active: 2015–2018
- Known for: Ratan Maan Singh on Pehredaar Piya Ki

Affan Khan is an Indian former television child actor. He is known for his portrayal of Ratan Maan Singh in Sony TV's Pehredaar Piya Ki and Roop in Colors TV's Roop - Mard Ka Naya Swaroop.

== Career ==
Before starting his acting career, Khan had appeared in a TV commercial for Pepsodent. He first appeared on television when he played the role of Danish in the Episode 3 of Darr Sabko Lagta Hai. In 2017, he played the lead role in Pehredaar Piya Ki as Ratan Maan Singh. After the show ended, he was cast in the Netflix web series Sacred Games as Young Sartaj Singh.

In 2018, he landed the role of Roop in Colors TV's Roop - Mard Ka Naya Swaroop.

== Personal life ==
Affan was born in 2007 to father Jameel Khan in Bangalore, India. He has two siblings Arsalan and Ifrah Khan.

== Filmography ==
Year	Title	Role	Channel	Notes
2015	Darr Sabko Lagta Hai	Danish	&TV	Episode 3
2017	Pehredaar Piya Ki	Child Ratan Singh	Sony Entertainment Television	
2018	Roop – Mard Ka Naya Swaroop	Child Roopendra "Roop" Singh Vaghela	Colors TV	
2018	Sacred Games	Young Sartaj Singh	Netflix	
