= Bhagya Lakshmi =

Indian drama television series

- Genre: Soap opera Drama; Romance
- Created by: Ekta Kapoor
- Developed by: Ekta Kapoor
- Written by: Anil Nagpal; Kavita Nagpal; Mrinal Tripathi; Dialogues: Dheeraj Sarna; Nishchal Shome
- Screenplay by: Anil Nagpal; Mrinal Tripathi; Satish Cheda
- Story by: Anil Nagpal; Kavita Nagpal
- Directed by: Sanjay Satavase; Muzammil Desai; Nitesh Mishra; Rakesh Malhotra
- Creative director: Shivangi Babbar
- Starring: Aishwarya Khare; Rohit Suchanti
- Theme music composer: Lalit Sen; Nawab Arzoo
- Opening theme: "Laado Rani Babul Ki Sadayein Leti Ja; Laado Rani Babul Ki Duwayein Leti Ja"
- Composer: Binod Ghimre
- Country of origin: India
- Original language: Hindi
- No. of seasons: 1
- No. of episodes: 1358

Production
- Executive producers: Ritesh Yadav; Akash Ahuja; Nilansh Mehta; Dhoopi; Shibani
- Producers: Ekta Kapoor; Shobha Kapoor
- Cinematography: Maneesh Malik; Deepak Malwankar
- Editors: Vikas Sharma; Vishal Sharma; Sandeep Bhatt
- Camera setup: Multi-camera
- Running time: 22—43 minutes
- Production company: Balaji Telefilms

Original release
- Network: Zee TV
- Release: 3 August 2021 – 29 June 2025

Related
- Kumkum Bhagya; Kundali Bhagya

Bhagya Lakshmi (transl. Lakshmi's Fate) is an Indian Hindi-language romantic drama television series premiered on 3 August 2021 on Zee TV and streams digitally on ZEE5. Produced by Ekta Kapoor and Shobha Kapoor's Balaji Telefilms, it is a spin-off of Kumkum Bhagya and Kundali Bhagya. One of the longest running Indian television soap opera, the series starred Aishwarya Khare and Rohit Suchanti as leads. The show went off air on 29 June 2025. On March 24, 2025, Bhagya Lakshmi was broadcast in German by the former Zee One channel on Samsung TV Plus and Rakuten TV in German.

== Plot ==
The story begins with Lakshmi moving from Punjab to Mumbai after her parents' death. She is forced into an arranged marriage with the wealthy Rishi Oberoi. Unknown to her, the marriage is a sham orchestrated by Rishi’s mother, Neelam, because a priest predicted that Lakshmi’s horoscope is the only thing that can save Rishi from a death curse (Markesh Dosh). Abhay successfully deceives Virendra into signing property documents by catching him while he is distracted by a phone call.

Malishka tampers with the brakes of Virendra's car. While Virendra is driving with Lakshmi, his car brakes fail, putting his life in grave danger. An accident occurs; Virendra's car falls into a deep ditch, Lakshmi manages to get out while Virendra falls into the ditch. Following the crash, a severely injured Virendra gets BBB hospitalized ٫ Malishka plans to kill and goes to his room to remove his oxygen mask and does it but before she succeeds Lakshmi comes to the room and Malishka puts it back and hides, Virendra then slips into coma, Malishka makes it appear Lakshmi causes the accident, Neelam and Rishi oust her from the Oberoi house and she gets into a train accident while on her way to the village and is presumed dead by the Oberois. After the 7 year leap, Lakshmi lives and raises her and Rishi's daughter Paro in her village while Rishi is shown to be married to Malishka and adopts, Rohan who turns out to be Lakshmi and Rishi's son. Virendra is stated to be dead as Neelam hates Lakshmi for the responsible for Virendra's death. Rishi meets Paro and Lakshmi meets Rohan who both unaware of their truth. Early in the month, Lakshmi discovers that she is pregnant. She attempts to share the news with Rishi, but her announcement is overshadowed when Malishka also claims to be pregnant with Rishi's child to secure her position in the Oberoi house.

Malishka’s pregnancy is actually a scheme. She secretly collaborates with Balwinder, who visits her and demands money or the baby. Rishi is initially skeptical and refuses to hold a baby shower, but Malishka manipulates the family into celebrating her "good news" anyway. Anushka is revealed to be stealing money from Rishi's wardrobe to pay off her own secret debts. When Shalu finds evidence of Anushka's misdeeds, Anushka destroys Shalu’s phone and eventually plots with a man named Neel to kidnap Shalu.

On December 4, the police find an unidentifiable corpse. Malishka tries to convince everyone it is Lakshmi's body to permanently remove her from the picture, but Lakshmi is later revealed to be alive. By late December, Balwinder openly lays claim to "his child" (the one Malishka is pretending to carry), causing panic for Malishka and Kiran. Simultaneously, Neel and Anushka's goons accidentally take an unconscious Lakshmi hostage while trying to escape. Following her failure to kill Lakshmi, Malishka and her mother, Kiran, hatch a plan to trap Rishi. Malishka drugs Rishi's drink, causing him to become intoxicated and disoriented. A drugged Rishi accidentally gets close to Lakshmi, but Malishka intervenes by rendering Lakshmi unconscious. She then positions herself in bed with Rishi so the family will "catch" them together, leading everyone to believe Rishi was intimate with Malishka.

Meanwhile, a man named Neel appears and confronts Anushka, revealing that she is already married to him and never got a divorce before marrying Aayush. He begins blackmailing her for money to keep the secret. Despite Malishka’s schemes, Rishi repeatedly tells her that he only loves Lakshmi and wants to be with her, which further fuels Malishka's vengeful actions. Shalu and Aayush become highly suspicious of Malishka’s behavior and her secret connection with Balwinder, who returns to help Malishka distract Shalu during a family party. Aayush and Harleen recover data proving that Anushka is already married to a man named Neel. Neel briefly holds Rishi and Lakshmi hostage before being arrested, though Anushka initially manages to evade capture. Aayush finally confesses his love for Shalu when he proposes marriage during the Lohri celebration in front of the entire family, shocking Neelam. Anushka later attacks Shalu with a knife, Aayush saves her and symbolically marries her by filling her hair parting with his own blood. Malishka and Kiran continue their schemes to drive Lakshmi out of the house. They attempt to frame her for stealing a valuable necklace during the Lohri festivities. Karishma and Neelam finally agree to the union, Shalu and Aayush decide to get married. However, the month is filled with attempts to sabotage their happiness: Anushka frames Shalu for stealing an engagement ring to stop the wedding.

Rishi steps in to save Shalu from being arrested, leading to a confrontation with Anushka. Lakshmi becomes highly suspicious of Balwinder's presence and follows Malishka to a hospital to uncover who she is meeting. Malishka locks Lakshmi inside a cold storage room to prevent her from revealing the truth, Anushka plots to destroy the Oberoi family by mixing poison into laddoos (sweets). Shalu catches her in the kitchen and demands she eat one to prove they are safe. In the final months, Rishi’s mother, Neelam, is murdered. Malishka successfully frames Lakshmi for the crime, leading to her arrest and deep hatred from Rishi. Shalu exposes Malishka with proof and Rishi kicks her out of Oberoi mansion.

== Cast ==
=== Main ===
- Aishwarya Khare as Lakshmi Rishi Oberoi: Kuljeet and Manoj's eldest daughter; (2021–2025)
- Rohit Suchanti as Rishi Oberoi: Neelam and Virendra's son; (2021—2025)

=== Recurring ===
==== Oberoi family ====
- Neena Cheema as Harleen Oberoi: The Matriarch of Oberoi family ; Vishwas's widow; (2021–2025)
- Uday Tikekar as Virendra Oberoi: Harleen and Vishwas's son; (2021-2024)
- Smita Bansal as Neelam Oberoi: Virendra's widow; (2021–2025)
- Trisha Sarda / Pahal Chaudhary as Parvati "Paro" Oberoi: Rishi and Lakshmi's daughter; (2024—2025) / (2025)
- Hanish Kaushal / Shreyansh Kaurav as Rohan Oberoi: Rishi and Malishka’s adopted son; (2024) / (2024—2025)
- Shivani Jha as Sonia Oberoi: Neelam daughter; (2021–2024)
- Parakh Madan as Aanchal Oberoi: Neelam's younger sister (2024—2025)
- Bebika Dhurve as Devika Oberoi: Mahendra's daughter (2021—2023)

==== Chopra family ====
- Parull Chaudhary as Karishma Chopra: Ayushmaan and Ahana's mother (2021–2025)
- Aditi Shetty as Ahana Chopra: Karishma daughter; (2021–2023)
- Aman Gandhi as Ayushmaan "Ayush" Chopra: Karishma son; (2021–2025)

==== Bajwa family ====
- Veerendra Saxena as Manoj Bajwa: Preetam's brother; (2021)
- Neelu Dogra as Kuljeet Bajwa: Manoj's wife; (2021)
- Munira Kudrati as Shalini "Shalu" Bajwa : Kuljeet and Manoj's second daughter; (2021–2025)
- Manasi Bhanushali as Bani Bajwa: Kuljeet and Manoj's youngest daughter; (2021–2024)
- Massheuddin Qureshi as Preetam Bajwa: Kuljeet's brother; (2021–2024)
- Neha Prajapati as Rano Bajwa: Preetam's wife; (2021–2025)
- Avantika Chaudhary / Tasneem Khan / Urmimala Sinha Roy as Neha Bajwa: Preetam and Rano's daughter (2021—2023)

==== Bedi Family ====
- Karan Kaushal Sharma/unknown as Abhay Bedi: Kiran's husband; (2021—2023)/(2023-2024)
- Karuna Verma as Kiran Bedi: Abhay's wife; (2021–2025)
- Maera Mishra / Megha Prasad as Malishka Bedi: Kiran and Abhay's daughter; (2021—2025) / (2025)

=== Other recurring cast ===
- Ankit Bhatia as Balwinder "Ballu" Sood: Lakshmi's one-sided obsessive ex-lover; (2021–2025)
- Kavita Banerjee as Sonal: Malishka's college friend (2022–2024)
- Shashank Chandra as Goon's aide (2021)
- Melanie Pais as Inspector Durga (2021)
- Akash Choudhary as Viraj Singhania: Malishka's ex-fiancé (2021)
- Kaushal Kapoor as Darshan (2021)
- Mridula Oberoi as Kalyani (2021)
- Firdaus as Arnav: A kick boxer and swimmer (2021)
- Syed Ashraf Karim as Gurucharan Anand (2021)
- Girish Thapar as Pandit (2021)
- Ajay Raju as Pandit Ji (2021)
- Unknown as Kamli: Balwinder's ex-wife (2022—2023)
- Saurabbh Ravi Dutta as Doctor (2022)
- Jyoti Mukherjee / Rajani Gupta as Anjana Kakkar: Vikrant and Puneet's mother (2023)
- Mohit Malhotra as Vikrant Kakkar: Anjana's son; (2023)
- Shraddha Jaiswal as Saloni Kakkar: Vikrant's wife (2023)
- Sandeep Kapoor as Puneet Kakkar: Vikrant's brother (2023)
- Varsha Bhagwani as Ishita Iyer: Lakshmi's friend (2023–2025)
- Unknown as Ranjeet: Lakshmi's one-sided obsessive ex-lover (2024)
- Munendra Singh Kushwah as Inspector Rathore (2023-2024)
- Nirvaan Anand as Neel Mehra: Anushka's husband (2025)
- V S Prince Ratan as Mascot (2025)
- Krutika Khira as Anushka Mehra Saluja: Ansh's sister; (2024–2025)
- Suraj Pratap Singh as Ansh: Anushka brother (2024)

=== Special appearances ===
- Sriti Jha as Pragya Arora Mehra (2021)
- Shabir Ahluwalia as Abhishek Mehra (2021)
- Shraddha Arya as Dr. Preeta Arora Luthra (2021)
- Dheeraj Dhoopar as Karan Luthra (2021)
- Anjum Fakih as Srishti Sameer Luthra (2021)
- Manit Joura as Rishabh Luthra (2021)
- Supriya Shukla as Sarla Arora (2021)
- Anisha Hinduja as Rakhi Luthra (2021)
- Abhishek Kapoor as Sameer Luthra (2021)
- Mugdha Chaphekar as Prachi Arora Kohli (2021)
- Krishna Kaul as Ranbir Kohli (2021)

== Production ==
Aishwarya Khare and Rohit Suchanti were finalised to reprise their roles as leads in May 2021 itself, but due to the lockdown in Maharashtra, they signed the contract only in June. Filming and production began on 14 June 2021 in Film City, Mumbai.

In February 2024, the narrative underwent a 7 year leap. The show completed 1000 episodes in July 2024.

In May 2025, media reports indicated that Balaji Telefilms and Zee TV initially planned a generation leap to refresh the plot. However, due to declining TRP ratings and a broader channel programming overhaul, the proposed leap was scrapped, and the makers decided to cancel the series entirely. After a successful run of 4 years, the final episode aired on 29 June 2025. Its timeslot was filled by Tumm Se Tumm Tak.

=== Casting ===
After the leap, Krutika Khira was cast as Anushka. Also child actors, Shreyansh Kaurav and Trisha Sarda were cast as Rohan and Parvati Oberoi respectively. In June 2024, Parakh Madan joined the show in a pivotal role as sister of Neelam. In May 2025, Smita Bansal portraying Neelam quit the series, as her character wraps up. Maera Mishra who played Malishka also quit the series, ahead of her weddingand replaced by Megha Prasad from February 2025.

== Reception ==
During its run, Bhagya Lakshmi frequently entering the national top five programs at the 5th place with a peak TRP range of 2.0 to 2.2 during (2022-2023) period. Driven by major plot points, the drama later stabilized within a modest rating range of 1.1 to 1.3. However, by mid-2024, ratings began a noticeable decline, dropping to 1.7 TRP in February before further slipping to 1.2 by July.

Fans praised the on-screen chemistry between leads Aishwarya Khare (Lakshmi) and Rohit Suchanti (Rishi), audience popularly named them as "RishMi", became one of the most popular pair of Indian Television, with reviewers noting Khare's portrayal of the resilient Lakshmi as a standout for its nuance.

== Adaptations ==
Language	Title	Original release	Network(s)	Last aired	Notes	Ref.
Telugu	Chiranjeevi Lakshmi Sowbhagyavathi చిరంజీవి లక్ష్మి సౌభాగ్యవతి	9 January 2023	Zee Telugu	26 April 2025	Remake	
Odia	Tuma Bina ତୁମ ବିନା	10 June 2024	Zee Sarthak	Ongoing	Remake	
Kannada	Soubhagyavathi Bhava ಸೌಭಾಗ್ಯವತಿ ಭವ	22 May 2023	Zee Kannada	Ongoing	Dubbed	
Malayalam	Megharagam മേഘരാഗം	6 November 2023	Zee Keralam	Ongoing	Dubbed	
Tamil	Lakshmi Kalyanam லட்சுமி கல்யாணம்	27 August 2024	Zee Tamil	Ongoing	Dubbed	

== Awards and nominations ==
Year	Award	Category	Recipient	Result	Ref
2021	Indian Television Academy Awards	Best Story	Anil Nagpal	Won	
2021	Indian Television Academy Awards	Best Actress in Supporting Role - TV (Popular)	Munira Kudrati	Nominated	
2021	Indian Television Academy Awards	Best Actor in Supporting Role - TV (Popular)	Aman Gandhi	Nominated	
2021	Indian Television Academy Awards	Best Actor in Lead Role (Popular)	Rohit Suchanti	Nominated	
2021	Indian Television Academy Awards	Best Actress in Lead Role (Popular)	Aishwarya Khare	Nominated	
2021	Indian Television Academy Awards	Best Television Show - Fiction (Popular)	Ekta Kapoor	Nominated	
2022	14th Gold Awards	Best Actor in Lead Role (Popular)	Rohit Suchanti	TBA	
2022	14th Gold Awards	Best Actress in Lead Role (Popular)	Aishwarya Khare	TBA	
2022	14th Gold Awards	Best Onscreen Couple	Rohit Suchanti & Aishwarya Khare	TBA	
2022	14th Gold Awards	Best TV Show (Fiction)	Ekta Kapoor	TBA	
2022	14th Gold Awards	Best Director	Muzzammil Desai	TBA	
2022	14th Gold Awards	Best Actor in Supporting Role (Male)	Uday Tikekar	TBA	
2022	14th Gold Awards	Best Actor in Supporting Role (Female)	Munira Kudrati	TBA	
2022	14th Gold Awards	Best Actor in Negative Role (Female)	Maera Mishra	TBA	
