= Rohit Suchanti =

Indian television actor

- Born: 6 April 1996 (age 30); Mumbai, Maharashtra, India
- Occupation: Actor
- Years active: 2011, 2015–present
- Known for: Bhagya Lakshmi; Kyunki Saas Bhi Kabhi Bahu Thi 2; Kyunki Rishton Ke Bhi Roop Badalte Hain

Rohit Suchanti is an Indian actor who mainly works in Hindi television. He is best known for his participation in the reality show Bigg Boss 12. He gained fame for his lead role as Rishi Oberoi in Ekta Kapoor's Bhagya Lakshmi on Zee TV. Suchanti earned wider recognition for portraying Angad Virani in legendary soap opera Kyunki Saas Bhi Kabhi Bahu Thi 2 and it's spin-off Kyunki Rishton Ke Bhi Roop Badalte Hain on StarPlus.

== Career ==
Rohit Suchanti made his debut in television by acting in several episodic roles, he played the role of Dhruv in Pyaar Tune Kya Kiya 4 on 2014. In 2015, he got role of Rohit Agrawal in Warrior High and Vikram in Pyaar Tune Kya Kiya 5. He played the role of Abhay in Pyaar Tune Kya Kiya in 2016.

In early 2017, he played Ramakant (Ricky) Modi in Saath Nibhaana Saathiya on Star Plus. Then he played Jai in ALTBalaji's Class of 2017. In September 2017, he joined Rishta Likhenge Hum Naya playing Ratan Maan Singh on Sony TV. In October 2018, he joined Bigg Boss 12 as the second wildcard entry. In 2019, he played Anshuman Sharma in Zee TV's Dil Yeh Ziddi Hai.

From August 2021 to June 2025, Suchanti played the lead role of Rishi Oberoi in Ekta Kapoor'sBhagya Lakshmi. Since July 2025, he is playing the role of Angad Virani in the popular show Kyunki Saas Bhi Kabhi Bahu Thi 2 and From March 2026, he became the main lead of its spin-off.

== Media image ==
In 2026, he was listed in 40 Under 40 by the Indian edition of Variety.

== Filmography ==
=== Television ===
Year	Serial	Role	Notes	Ref.
2011	Saas Bina Sasural	Bittu	as Child Artist	
2015	Warrior High	Rohit Agarwal	Supporting Role	
2017	Saath Nibhaana Saathiya	Ramakant "Ricky" Modi	Parallel Lead Role	
2017–2018	Rishta Likhenge Hum Naya	Ratan Maan Singh	Lead Role	
2018	Bigg Boss 12	Contestant	(8th place)	
2019–2020	Dil Yeh Ziddi Hai	Anshuman Sharma	Lead Role	
2021–2025	Bhagya Lakshmi	Rishi Oberoi	Lead Role	
2025–2026	Kyunki Saas Bhi Kabhi Bahu Thi 2	Angad "AV" Virani	Lead Role	
2026–present	Kyunki Rishton Ke Bhi Roop Badalte Hain	Angad "AV" Virani	Lead Role	

==== Special appearances ====
Year	Title	Role	Notes	Ref.
2015	Pyaar Tune Kya Kiya 4	Dhruv	Episode 13	
2015	Pyar Tune Kya Kiya 5	Vikram	Episode 8	
2016	Pyaar Tune Kya Kiya 7	Abhay	Episode 16	
2017	Pyaar Tune Kya Kiya 9	Rajveer	Episode 9	
2018	Ace of Space 1	Himself		
2020	Shaadi Mubarak	Aryan Mantri		
2022; 2024	Kumkum Bhagya	Rishi Oberoi		
2023	Bollystar Vacation	Himself		
2026	Jhanak	Angad Virani		
2026	Sairaab	Angad Virani		

=== Web series ===
Year	Title	Role	Ref.
2017	Class of 2017	Jai	

=== Music videos ===
Year	Title	Singer(s)	Ref.
2019	Strawberry Warga	Navv Inder	
2020	Teri Aankhon Mein	Darshan Raval, Neha Kakkar	
2021	Wafa Na Raas Aayee	Jubin Nautiyal	
