= Television Viewer Rating =

UK TV audience measurement system

TVRs (Television Viewer Ratings) are the standard buying currency for television advertising in the UK. Television ratings are expressed as a percentage of the potential TV audience viewing at any given time. TVR's measure the popularity of a television program or advertisement by comparing the number of target audience viewers who watched against the total available as a whole. One TVR is equivalent to 1% of a target audience. For example, if an ad in any afternoon show gets a Housewives' TVR of 20, that means that 20% of all housewives viewed the ad. TVR=Reach x Time Spent
