= Highway (2014 Bengali film) =

2014 Indian Bengali-language film

- Theatrical release poster
- Directed by: Sudipto Chattopadhyay
- Produced by: Nispal Singh
- Starring: Parambrata Chatterjee; Koel Mallick
- Edited by: Rabiranjan Maitra
- Music by: Anupam Roy
- Production company: Surinder Films
- Distributed by: Surinder Films
- Release date: 8 August 2014
- Running time: 111 minutes
- Country: India
- Language: Bengali

Highway is an Indian Bengali romantic film, directed by Sudipto Chattopadhyay and produced under the banner of Surinder Films. The film features actors Koel Mallick and Parambrata Chatterjee in the lead roles. Music of the film was composed by Anupam Roy. This film was released on 8 August 2014.

== Plot ==
The story of the film revolves around the life of two people, who come across each other on a highway, which takes a very significant position in their life, being the witness of all their ups and downs. Their love story takes various twists and turns.

Koel and Parambrata played the role of an unhappy couple in this film, who could not bridge the gap between themselves even after trying for long. Koel's role was that of a Bengali girl while Parambrata played a non-Bengali guy. Though their marriage was a love marriage, they realise that there was a vacancy in their life. The way they overcome that vacancy and discover each other from a new point of view, forms the climax of the story.

== Cast ==
- Parambrata Chatterjee as Ashwin "Win" Kapoor
- Koel Mallick as Sohini Dasgupta
- Silajit Majumder as Firdous Aga
- Deepankar De
- Bharat Kaul
- Sabitri Chatterjee
- Rita Dutta Chakraborty as Pritha
- Gaurav Chakrabarty as Dhruba (extended cameo)

== Production ==
=== Development ===
Surinder Films, the production house of Nispal Singh Rane (Koel Mallick's husband), financed this film. The film also marks the Bengali directorial debut of Sudipto Chattopadhyay of Shobhana 7 Nights and Pankh fame. The film was earlier titled Aparichito, which was later changed to Highway.

=== Casting ===
Actress Koel Mallick was signed to play the female lead opposite Parambrata Chatterjee, which was their second pairing after Hemlock Society. Her character is that of a psychologically affected woman, whose father died while she was in 9th Standard. Regarding her role, she said, "It has Parambrata and me and once again we play characters that are completely opposite to each other but I wouldn't compare it to a Hemlock Society." Because of being preoccupied with this film, she rejected the offer of being cast as the female lead in Aniruddha Roy Chowdhury's Buno Haansh, opposite Dev. Actor Gaurav Chakrabarty played the character of a rockstar in this film.

=== Filming ===
Filming locations included the picturesque hill station of Darjeeling in West Bengal. Shooting was delayed a bit due to excessive downpours during the crew's stay at Darjeeling.

== Soundtrack ==
Anupam Roy roped in to compose the film score for Highway. Lyrics were also penned by him.

#	Title	Singer(s)
1	"Protidin"	Silajit Majumder & Anupam Roy
2	"Tomay Niyei Golpo Hok"	Anupam Roy & Prashmita Paul
3	"Khela Shesh (Male)"	Arijit Singh
4	"Surjyo Rongin"	Anupam Roy
5	"Phire Dekha"	Tanya Sen
6	"Khela Shesh (Female)"	Ujjaini Mukherjee
