= Maradona Rebello =

Indian actor and model (born 1986)

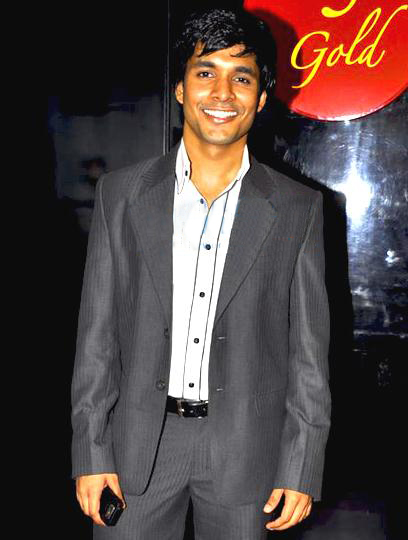
- Rebello in April 2010
- Born: 31 May 1986 (age 40); Mumbai, India
- Occupations: Model, actor, influencer
- Years active: 2009–present

Maradona Rebello (born 31 May 1986) is an Indian actor and model who works in the Bollywood film industry. Rebello's first name was kept by his father after being inspired by the footballer Diego Maradona. After doing theatre in school and a brief career in acting, Rebello's film career began with the 2010 film Pankh. Rebello is also a well known model, having worked for brands like Ford, Close-Up, Axe, Intel, 7 Up, L'Oreal and Volkswagen.

== Life and career ==
=== 1986–2007: Early life ===
Rebello was born in a Christian family in Bhayander, during the 1986 FIFA World Cup. His football-loving father, who was a sports manager in his company at the time, named him after Argentinian footballer Maradona after Maradona's performance in the quarter final match.

Rebello had always been fascinated by films, and was into dramatics in school. However, he wanted to be doctor when he was young. He was also a state level judo player, and knows dancing too. His modelling career took off by chance when he was spotted by a model coordinator outside a cinema hall and was signed up for assignments. He got enrolled in a theatre course under Raj Jagdishan, and acted in a play titled "An Evening with Shakespeare and Actors".

Rebello also auditioned for the 2008 film Slumdog Millionaire and met director Danny Boyle, but was rejected because Boyle thought that his looks were not Indian enough to meet his characterization.

=== 2008–2021: Bollywood debut with Pankh ===
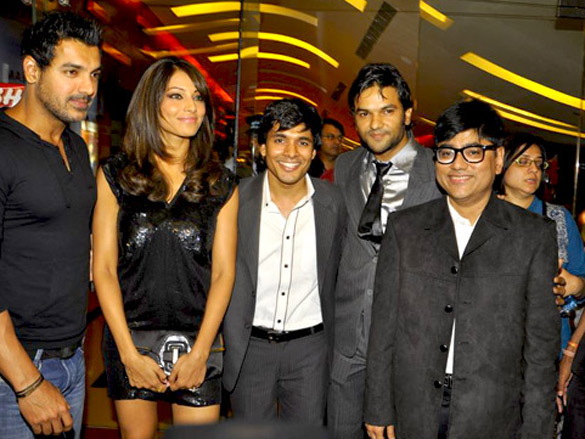
Premiere of Pankh. From left, John Abraham, Bipasha Basu, Rebello, Amit Purohit and Sudipto Chattopadhay.

While doing BMM (Bachelors in Mass Media) from St. Xavier's College, Mumbai, Rebello got an offer from Sudipto Chattopadhay to audition for his film Pankh. He went for the audition and gave his shots, but was apprehensive to join the Bollywood film industry, because he believed in a different image of Bollywood—one with romance and drama. When he was offered the lead role in the film, he was in the final year of college, and he dropped out to act in the film, because the shooting dates clashed with his exams.

In Pankh, Rebello played the character of a 20-year-old boy named Jerry, who used to act in girl roles when he was a young boy. The actor had initially backed out— as the script demanded him to be nude for a scene, and be forcefully kissed by a character played by his male co-star Amit Purohit in another— but went ahead when his parents and his mentor Raj Jagdishan gave the nod. He mentioned in interviews that those scenes were the toughest for him, but he was proud of his work. He also had to take up smoking for the film, and mentioned that there was a time when he "started puking after inhaling too much of smoke".

While Pankh received negative reviews, his performance in the movie received appreciation from critics.

Before the release of the movie, Rebello gained recognition from his first commercial in 2009, which was part of Close-Up's iconic "Pass Aao Na" ad campaign.

His next role in a movie was of Sam in Dunno Y Na Jaane Kyun (2010).

=== 2022–present: Move to Dubai ===
After 12 years in Mumbai's entertainment industry, Rebello moved to Dubai, since there were no Indian actors for the global campaigns shot there. This decision came after the COVID-19 lockdown, when he and his wife decided to explore career opportunities in places outside Mumbai.

After shifting to Dubai in 2022, he worked with eminent brands like Talabat with Cristiano Ronaldo for the World Cup campaign, Abu Dhabi Tourism, Etisalat, etc. During the 2022 FIFA World Cup, he expressed his intention of naming his son after Messi, just like his father named him after Maradona; and after this story was published, he was invited by a cafe owner in Naples, where he travelled post the World Cup final.

Apart from being an actor and model, Rebello is also a travel influencer, and appeared in the culinary show Colors Food Trail. He is an environmentalist as well, and hosted the weekly raffle of "the world’s first sustainable draw" O! Millionaire.

== Influences ==
His primary influences have been actors Shahrukh Khan and Amitabh Bachchan. His other inspirations are Mexican actor Gael García Bernal and Hollywood actors Leonardo DiCaprio and Jude Law.
