= Seven Nights =

Seven nights is an archaic term for a week. It may also refer to:

- Seven Nights, 1984 book by Jorge Luis Borges
- 7 Nights (mixtape), 2017 mixtape by Krept and Konan
- Seven Nights in Japan, a 1976 drama film directed by Lewis Gilbert and starring Michael York
- Shobhana 7 Nights, an Indian film
