= Kundali Bhagya =

Indian drama television series

- Genre: Soap opera Drama; Romance
- Created by: Ekta Kapoor
- Developed by: Ekta Kapoor
- Written by: Manpreet Singh Arshi; Anil Nagpal
- Screenplay by: Anil Nagpal; Mrinal Tripathi
- Story by: Kavita Nagpal; Anil Nagpal
- Directed by: Sameer Kulkarni; Abhishek Kumar.R.Pal; Aman Varpe; Sahil Sharma; Neeraj Baliyan; Huzaifa Ali; Ismail Umar Khan; Nitesh Mishra; Anil V. Kumar
- Creative directors: Chloe Ferns Qureshi; Mukta Dhond; Akash; Jaspreet Kaur; Bijal Ajmera; Khushboo Deewana; Rimzhim Sain
- Starring: Shraddha Arya; Dheeraj Dhoopar; Manit Joura; Shakti Arora; Shakti Anand; Paras Kalnawat; Sana Sayyad; Baseer Ali; Adrija Roy
- Theme music composer: Lalit Sen; Ashish Rego
- Opening theme: "Sajda Tera Sajda" by Rahat Fateh Ali Khan, Richa Sharma & Shankar Mahadevan
- Country of origin: India
- Original language: Hindi
- No. of seasons: 1
- No. of episodes: 2,048

Production
- Executive producer: Karan Asrani
- Producers: Ekta Kapoor; Shobha Kapoor
- Editors: Vishal Sharma; Vikas Sharma; Sandeep Bhatt
- Camera setup: Multi-camera
- Running time: 22–23 minutes
- Production company: Balaji Telefilms Limited

Original release
- Network: Zee TV
- Release: 12 July 2017 – 6 December 2024

Related
- Kumkum Bhagya; Bhagya Lakshmi

Kundali Bhagya (transl. The Fate of Our Horoscope) known Internationally as This is Fate, is an Indian Hindi-language romantic drama television series created by Ekta Kapoor and produced by Balaji Telefilms. A spin-off of Kumkum Bhagya, it premiered on 12 July 2017 on Zee TV and streams digitally on ZEE5. One of the longest running Indian television soap opera, the show featured Shraddha Arya, Dheeraj Dhoopar, Manit Joura, Shakti Arora, Shakti Anand, Paras Kalnawat, Sana Sayyad, Baseer Ali, and Adrija Roy. The series ended on 6 December 2024.

== Plot ==
The Arora sisters, Preeta and Srishti, move to Mumbai to fulfill their father’s dying wish of reuniting with their mother, Sarla. Preeta becomes a physiotherapist for Bani Luthra, the matriarch of the Luthra family. While the elder grandson, Rishabh, shares a cordial bond with her, the younger one, Karan, a cricket star, has a strained relationship with her. Preeta and Karan, though initially at loggerheads and bickering, start to slowly develop a friendship with each other that turns into love, though neither confesses their feelings.

Rishabh is set to marry Sherlyn, but Preeta and Karan discover that Sherlyn is having an affair with Preeta's fiancé, Prithvi. Despite their attempts to stop the wedding, Sherlyn manipulates the situation, and Karan, influenced by misunderstandings, starts hating Preeta. On the day of Preeta’s wedding to Prithvi, Karan takes his place, marrying her out of spite but soon abandoning her. Kareena arranges for Karan to marry Mahira, his obsessive childhood friend. Preeta then replaces Mahira and marries Karan to protect his family from Mahira and Sherlyn's plots. Despite their reconciliation, Karan and Preeta face more obstacles as Sherlyn and Prithvi continue to scheme against them.

Three months later, Preeta and Karan adopt a child, Pihu. Sonakshi, Karan’s college friend, tries to separate them due to her obsession with Karan. Sonakshi arranges for a goon to cause an accident that results in Pihu’s death. Preeta is blamed for the accident and removed from the Luthra house, while Karan expels Sonakshi for coercing him into marrying her.

Two years later, Preeta returns to Mumbai from her hometown. She meets Mahesh, who is now mentally unstable after being tortured by Prithvi. She learns that Prithvi has taken control of the Luthra business and is exploiting the family after having married Karan's cousin, Kritika. With Mahesh’s will, Preeta re-enters the Luthra mansion and exposes Prithvi’s schemes and restores the family's wealth. She helps Rishabh return from Dubai, where he had been trapped by Prithvi, and they both expose Sherlyn and Prithvi. Sherlyn and Natasha try to convince Karan that Preeta and Rishabh are having an affair. Karan is manipulated into believing this, and he is later pushed off a dam by Natasha and Roxy. He is presumed dead. Preeta, who is pregnant with Karan's child, marries Rishabh for the child’s legitimacy. Preeta gives birth to a daughter, Kavya.

Five years later, Karan is revealed to have survived the accident but suffered memory loss and undergone plastic surgery. He returns as Arjun Suryavanshi and is engaged to Nidhi Hinduja, who saved him. As Arjun, Karan tries to destroy Preeta and Rishabh, believing they pushed him off the dam. Eventually, after learning Karan's true identity, Preeta and Rishabh prove their innocence through CCTV footage. Karan regains his memory and reconciles with Preeta. He severs ties with Nidhi. After a few months, Karan and Preeta have fraternal twin sons, Rudraksh and Shaurya. Nidhi's sister, Anjali, who is obsessed with Karan, kidnaps Rudraksh. However, after a series of events, she dies in a confrontation. Preeta is once again blamed for the chaos and leaves the family, but she saves Rudraksh. It is presumed by the Luthras that Preeta and Rudraksh have died.

Twenty years later, Preeta and Srishti have relocated, and Srishti has raised Preeta’s son, Rudraksh, whom she renamed Rajveer. Preeta, who lost her memories after the accident, suffers from panic attacks. Rajveer, now grown up, learns about his true parentage and returns to Mumbai with a determination to reclaim Preeta’s honor. Eventually, Srishti and Preeta end up in Mumbai as well and she meets Karan, who is delighted to learn that she survived. Nidhi is now married to Karan and she does not want to lose him, hence, she tries to separate Karan and Preeta and prevent Preeta from regaining her memories. Nidhi then attacks Srishti when she learns her truth, who ends up in a coma. Meanwhile, Rajveer gets a job at Karan’s company, and Shaurya grows insecure about Rajveer and plots against him. Rajveer and Palki fall in love, while Nidhi and Shaurya continue to plot against Rajveer and Preeta. The Luthra family slowly begins to accept Preeta again. Kavya's fiancé, Varun, is revealed to be Prithvi and Sherlyn's son, Shelly, who came to take revenge. The relationship is called off. Rajveer is appointed CEO of Luthra Industries. Soon, Preeta realizes Shaurya's scheming, and a confrontation ensues, with Nidhi blaming Shaurya's actions on Rajveer. In a fit of rage, Rakhi and Mahesh end up revealing Rajveer's true identity in front of Preeta, triggering her memory. She collapses into a coma, and the family prays for her recovery. Thus ending the show on a sad and open end note.

== Cast ==
=== Main ===
- Shraddha Arya as Dr. Preeta Arora Luthra: A physiotherapist; Sarla and Raghuveer's second daughter (2017–2024)
- Dheeraj Dhoopar / Shakti Arora / Shakti Anand as Karan Luthra: A cricketer; Rakhi and Mahesh's younger son (2017–2022) / (2022–2023) / (2023–2024)
- Manit Joura as Rishabh Luthra: Rakhi and Mahesh's elder son (2017–2024)
- Paras Kalnawat as Rudraksh "Rudra" Luthra alias Rajveer Arora: Preeta and Karan's elder twin son (2023–2024)
- Baseer Ali as Shaurya Luthra: A rap artist; Preeta and Karan's younger twin son (2023–2024)
- Sana Sayyad / Adrija Roy as Dr. Palki Khurana: Shailendra and Daljeet's eldest daughter (2023–2024) / (2024)

=== Recurring ===
==== Aroras ====
- Vijay Kashyap as Raghuveer Arora: Daljeet's son (2017)
- Supriya Shukla as Sarla Arora: Raghuveer's widow (2017–2022)
- Madhu Raja as Daljeet Arora: Matriarch of the Arora family; Raghuveer's mother (2017–2023)
- Jasjeet Babbar / Mehnaaz Shroff as Janki: The Aroras' house help and caretaker (2017–2021) / (2021–2023)

==== Luthras ====
- Neelam Mehra as Bani Luthra: Matriarch of the Luthra family; Mahesh, Suresh, and Kareena's mother (2017–2024)
- Naveen Saini as Mahesh Luthra: Bani's elder son (2017–2024)
- Anisha Hinduja as Rakhi Luthra: Mahesh's wife (2017–2024)
- Mrinal Singh Lal as Ruchika Luthra: Mahesh and Rakhi's daughter (2017)
- Mrinal Navell Chandra as Kavya "Kavu" Luthra: Preeta and Karan's daughter (2023–2024)
  - Ananya Gambhir as young Kavya (2022–2023)
- Swarna Pandey as Pihu Luthra: Preeta and Karan's adoptive daughter (2021)
- Saptrishi Ghosh as Suresh Luthra: Bani's younger son (2021)
- Shravani Goswami as Parminder "Pammi" Luthra: Suresh's wife (2021)
- Pyumori Mehta Ghosh / Usha Bachani as Kareena Luthra: Bani's daughter (2017) / (2017–2024)
- Twinkle Vashisht as Kritika "Kriti" Luthra: Kareena's daughter (2017–2024)
- Abhishek Kapoor as Sameer "Sammy" Luthra: Rishabh and Karan's cousin (2017–2023)
- Anjum Fakih as Srishti Arora Luthra: Raghuveer and Sarla's younger daughter (2017–2023)
- Niya Sharma / Ira Sone / Akanksha Juneja as Nidhi "Nidz" Hinduja Luthra: Anjali's elder sister; later associated with the Luthra family (2022) / (2023) / (2023–2024)

==== Malhotras ====
- Sanjay Gagnani as Prithvi Malhotra: Pawan's brother (2017–2023)
- Ruhi Chaturvedi as Sherlyn Khurana Malhotra: Sanjana's daughter (2017–2023; 2024)
- Ashish Trivedi as Shelly "Varun Gill" Malhotra: Sherlyn and Prithvi's son (2023–2024)
- Kajal Jain as Aliya Malhotra: Shelly's wife (2024)
- Ankit Gupta as Pawan Malhotra: Prithvi's younger brother (2020–2021)

==== Khuranas ====
- Charanjit Kaur as Sukhwinder Khurana: Shailendra and Gurpreet's mother (2024)
- Farukh Saeed as Shailendra Khurana: Sukhwinder's son (2023)
- Roma Bali as Daljeet Khurana: Shailendra's wife (2023–2024)
- Rose Sardana as Mahi Khurana: Shailendra and Daljeet's daughter (2023)
- Shalini Mahal as Shanaya "Sona" Khurana: Shailendra and Daljeet's daughter (2023–2024)

==== Bajwas ====
- Niju Machhan as Gurpreet Khurana Bajwa: Sukhwinder's daughter (2023–2024)
- Sohil Singh Jhuti as Mohit Bajwa: Gurpreet's son (2023–2024)

==== Gills ====
- Gayatri Soham / Naina Gupta / Mayanka Sharma Patel as Dr. Roma Gill: Gautam's wife (2023) / (2024) / (2024)
- Farooq Khan / Rajesh Sharma as Gautam Gill: Shelly's fake father (2023) / (2024)
- Guneet Sharma as Rahul Gill: Son of Gautam and Roma; Shelly's fake brother (2023)

==== Others ====
- Sahil Phull as Deepak: Preeta's ex-fiancé (2017)
- Shyn Khurana as Malishka: Karan's ex-girlfriend (2017)
- Sanjana Phadke as Sanjana Khurana: Sherlyn's mother (2017–2022; 2024)
- Roma Arora as Sofia: Karan's former girlfriend (2017–2018)
- Mahira Sharma as Monisha Sharma: Karan's ex-fiancée (2018–2019)
- Aman Gandhi as Ritvik: Monisha's boyfriend (2018)
- Swati Kapoor as Mahira Khanna: Ramona's daughter (2019–2021)
- Kasturi Banerjee / Geetanjali Mishra as Ramona Khanna: Mahira's mother (2019–2020) / (2020–2021)
- Akshay Raj Jawrani as Shiv: Karan's friend; one-sided lover of Preeta (2019)
- Saurabbh Ravi Dutta as Harsh: Karan and Rishabh’s office employee (2021)
- Aashish Mehrotra / Mukul Harish / Naveen Sharma as Akshay Ahuja: Mr. and Mrs. Ahuja's son (2017) / (2018) / (2021)
- Girish Thapar as Mr. Ahuja: Akshay's father (2017–2018; 2021)
- Parveen Kaur as Mrs. Ahuja: Akshay's mother (2017–2018; 2021)
- Ruchita Anchor as Megha Ahuja: Akshay's wife (2021)
- Mansi Srivastava as Sonakshi Raichand: Yashvardhan's daughter; Karan's college friend and obsessive lover (2021)
- Hemant Choudhary as Yashvardhan Raichand: Sonakshi's father (2021)
- Giriraj Kabra as Rajat Bedi: Sonakshi's fiancé (2021)
- Sonal Vengurlekar as Anjali Hinduja: Nidhi's younger sister; Karan's obsessive lover; Rajveer's kidnapper (2022–2023)
- Rishika Nag as Natasha Khurana / Payal: A con woman; Sherlyn's fake cousin (2021–2022; 2023)
- Vipin Sharma as Nagre: Prithvi's advocate (2021–2022)
- V S Prince Ratann as Operator: CCTV Footage Operator (2023)
- Pankaj Bijlani as Inspector Surya: Yash's father; Karan's rival; Narcotics Bureau officer (2023–2024)
- Saif Moin Khan as Anshuman Pandey: Karan's business rival (2024)
- Pulkit Jain as Sunny: Shaurya's childhood friend (2024)

== Production ==
=== Filming ===
The production and airing of the show was halted indefinitely in late March 2020 due to the COVID-19 pandemic. Due to the outbreak, the filming of television series and films was halted on 19 March 2020 and expected to resume on 1 April 2020 but could not and the series was last broadcast on 24 March 2020 when the remaining episodes were aired. After three months, the production and filming of the series resumed on 29 June 2020 and broadcast to resume from 13 July 2020.

=== Casting ===
In late November 2020, Manit Joura's character Rishabh Luthra was temporarily written out of the story while he filmed another Balaji show, Prem Bandhan for Dangal TV. After wrapping up the Dangal TV show and a brief hiatus, he returned to Kundali... in February 2021. Again in November 2021, he made an impromptu decision to officially quit the show as he felt he given everything to the character and there was no creative growth left. After an absence of roughly 7 months, he officially re-entered the show in 16 May 2022 after being impressed by a revamped script of creative changes and fresh story arcs for Rishabh.

In January 2022, Supriya Shukla who played Sarla Arora, quit the show, saying, "I had done everything as Sarla but there was not much left for me to do". In June of the same year, actor Dheeraj Dhoopar, who played Karan Luthra, also quit the series for personal reasons and was replaced by Shakti Arora.

First generation title screen featuring Shraddha Arya and Shakti Arora

In January 2023, a twenty-year generation leap and a new generation of leads were announced. Arora, who replaced Dhoopar as Karan, quit owing to the generation leap, stating he didn't want to play a father to grown-ups and wanted to explore other things. Arora was then replaced by Shakti Anand after the leap. Sanjay Gagnani, who portrayed Prithvi Malhotra, also announced his decisions to quit the series as he wanted to take up new opportunities. Shraddha Arya, who portrays Preeta Luthra, decided to continue as a mother to the new generation. Later in March 2023, Sonal Vengurlekar, playing Anjali Hinduja, also announced her decision to quit after the generation leap because she didn't wanted to age onscreen. Ruhi Chaturvedi, who portrayed Sherlyn Khurana, also quit right before leap as she wanted to explore more as an actress. However from June 2024 she made her appearance once again as Sherlyn.

Paras Kalnawat and Sana Sayyad were introduced as new leads with Kalnawat as one of Preeta's twin sons, Rudraksh Luthra alias Rajveer Arora and Sayyad as Dr. Palki Khurana while debutante Baseer Ali was cast as negative lead and another twin son of Preeta, Shaurya Luthra. In the same month, Rose Sardana was cast to play Mahi Khurana, Palki's sister marking her to return to television after a 3-year hiatus.

In May 2023, Anjum Fakih portraying Srishti Arora, who had initially taken a break from the show for participating in Fear Factor: Khatron Ke Khiladi 13, later confirmed quitting as her role was no longer challenging after the leap, but also said that she will return if the story requires her character, and she reprised her role in July 2023, post her stint in the adventure-based reality show. However she permanently quit the series in October 2023 to explore new projects by calling it the most difficult decision, and the storyline showcased Srishti ending up in coma with severe facial and physical burns due to Nidhi's murder attempt on her.

Later Abhishek Kapoor who portrayed Sameer Luthra too quit the series to try new spaces as an actor. In June 2023, Ira Sone portraying Nidhi quit the series and Akanksha Juneja replaced her. Later in the following month, Mrinal Navell Chandra was cast to play grown-up Kavya Luthra replacing Ananya Gambhir who played Kavya's younger version, while Aashish Trivedi was cast opposite her as Varun Gill and Guneet Sharma was cast to play his brother Rahul. But later on in June 2024 Varun's character was revealed to be Prithvi and Sherlyn's son Shelly Malhotra. In the following month, Shalini Mahal joined the cast as Palki's sister Shanaya Khurana.

In August 2023, Ananya Panday and Ayushmann Khurrana made cameo appearances to promote their movie Dream Girl 2 whereas the Luthra family is getting ready for Kavya’s (Mrinal) sangeet with Rakhi Maa (Anisha) arranging a surprise visit for Param and Pari at the Luthra House.

In February 2024, Manit Joura portraying Rishabh Luthra quit after being a part of the show for seven long years saying that he realized his journey in the show was over and an intelligent actor knows where to stop. While Rajesh Sharma replaced Farooq Khan as Goutam Gill in same month. In May 2024, Sana Sayyad portraying Palki quit the series due to her pregnancy and Adrija Roy stepped into her shoes opposite Paras Kalnawat. In same month Baseer Ali playing Shaurya Luthra was rumoured to quit the show but the actor denied so. However he confirmed about him serving his notice period required prior quitting the series in following month. The following month Mayanka Sharma Patel replaced Naina Gupta as Roma Gill who earlier replaced Gayatri Soham in February 2024. Meanwhile Sanjana Phadke too reprised her role of Sanjana Khurana in same month after 2 years hiatus.

=== Cancellation ===
On 19 November 2024, it was announced that the show would go off-air after a run of seven and a half years, with the final episode airing on 6 December 2024, hours after Shraddha Arya confirmed quitting the show due to her due date approaching. Actors Shakti Anand and Paras Kalnawat revealed that it was a '"sudden and shocking move by the channel and production house", and that they were not informed or prepared for this decision until the last moment.

== Reception ==
=== Impact ===
Kundali Bhagya is the second longest-running Indian television series of Zee TV after its sister show, Kumkum Bhagya. It took its generation leap on 16 March 2023 and completed its 1500 episodes on 10 April 2023.

Anjum Fakih's character was slated to be negative after three months from the day of premiere of the show, but the love of audience to her positive character made the production revoke their decision.

=== Ratings ===
Kundali Bhagya maintained a consistent viewership profile on Zee TV, regularly leading the Hindi General Entertainment Channel (GEC) landscape. The series premiered on July 12, 2017, with an initial Television Rating Point of 2.9, making it one of the network's highest-rated fiction launches in that time slot. The show went on to become the most popular show within a month and also topped the TRP charts for several years. Driven by the core storyline and the initial pairing of Dheeraj Dhoopar and Shraddha Arya, popularly named as "Preeran" and also Arya receiving critical acclaim for her performance the program reached the number one rank nationwide within its first month of broadcast. Following the resumption of television production after the COVID-19 pandemic lockdown in July 2020, the series immediately reclaimed the top position on television, placing ahead of its sister series Kumkum Bhagya, which occupied the second position.

Between 2018 and late 2020, the series frequently ranked as the highest-rated Hindi fiction show on Indian television, maintaining a stable weekly average of 3.5 TRP, with high-drama wedding episodes peaking at 3.8 TRP. Following late 2020, the show faced increased competition from newly launched soaps on rival networks, specifically Star Plus's daily drama Anupamaa, which assumed the top spot. Despite this, the program maintained a steady presence on the charts, frequently securing the second position nationwide with stable ratings ranging between 2.8 and 3.1 TRP, while continuing to outperform Kumkum Bhagya.

To refresh the long-running storytelling arcs, the production house introduced narrative transitions. A 5-year leap in 2021 and a subsequent 2-year jump in 2022—accompanied by casting changes including the introduction of Shakti Arora, initially stabilized the show's metrics within a 2.2 to 2.5 TRP range, achieving a top-five rank. In March 2023, the show executed a major 20-year second-generation leap, shifting the primary focus onto characters played by Paras Kalnawat, Baseer Ali, and Sana Sayyad. Following this transition and the eventual departures of original lead actors, the show experienced a gradual shift in urban audience retention, settling into a 1.5 to 1.9 TRP range during its multi-cast adjustments. By late 2023, the series averaged 1.8 TRP and moved to the number ten position overall. Due to programming reschedule, the network later shifted the series from its original 9:30 p.m. slot into a 10:00 p.m. time slot. The brand equity kept the show within a top-ten placement before concluding its nearly 8 year run of 2000+ episodes.

== Adaptations ==
Language	Title	Original release	Network(s)	Last aired	Notes
Odia	Bhagya Rekha ଭାଗ୍ୟ ରେଖା	22 April 2024	Zee Sarthak	28 February 2026	Remake

== Awards and nominations ==
Year	Award	Category	Recipient	Result	Ref.
2018	Gold Awards	Best Actress (Popular)	Shraddha Arya	Won	
2018	Gold Awards	Best Actress in Supporting Role (Popular)	Anjum Fakih	Won	
2018	Gold Awards	Best Actor in Supporting Role (Popular)	Manit Joura	Won	
2018	Gold Awards	Best Actress in Negative Role (Popular)	Ruhi Chaturvedi	Nominated	
2018	Gold Awards	Best Actor in Negative Role (Popular)	Sanjay Gagnani	Nominated	
2018	Gold Awards	Best Actor (Popular)	Dheeraj Dhoopar	Nominated	
2018	Gold Awards	Best Television Show (Popular)	Ekta Kapoor	Nominated	
2018	Indian Television Academy Awards	Best Actress In A Negative Role	Ruhi Chaturvedi	Nominated	
2018	Indian Television Academy Awards	Best Actor In A Negative Role	Sanjay Gagnani	Nominated	
2019	Indian Telly Awards	Best Daily Series (Popular)	Ekta Kapoor	Nominated	
2019	Indian Telly Awards	Best Jodi (Popular)	Dheeraj Dhoopar and Shraddha Arya	Nominated	
2019	Indian Telly Awards	Best Actor In Lead Role Female (Popular)	Shraddha Arya	Nominated	
2019	Indian Telly Awards	Best Actor in Supporting Role Male (Popular)	Manit Joura	Nominated	
2019	Indian Telly Awards	Best Actor in Supporting Role Female (Popular)	Anjum Fakih	Nominated	
2019	Indian Telly Awards	Best Actor in Negative Role Male (Popular)	Sanjay Gagnani	Nominated	
2019	Indian Telly Awards	Best Actor in Negative Role Female (Popular)	Ruhi Chaturvedi	Nominated	
2019	Gold Awards	Best Actress Female (Popular)	Shraddha Arya	Won	
2019	Gold Awards	Best Actor Male (Popular)	Dheeraj Dhoopar	Won	
2019	Gold Awards	Best Onscreen Jodi (Popular)	Shraddha Arya and Dheeraj Dhoopar	Nominated	
2019	Gold Awards	Best Actor in a Supporting Role (Female)	Anjum Fakih	Nominated	
2019	Gold Awards	Best Actor in a Supporting Role (Male)	Manit Joura	Nominated	
2019	Gold Awards	Best Actor in Negative Role Male (Popular)	Sanjay Gagnani	Nominated	
2019	Gold Awards	Best Actor in Negative Role Male (Critics)	Sanjay Gagnani	Won	
2019	Gold Awards	Best Actress in Negative Role Female (Popular)	Ruhi Chaturvedi	Nominated	
2019	Gold Awards	Best TV Show (Popular)	Ekta Kapoor	Won	
2019	Indian Television Academy Awards	Best Actor (Popular)	Dheeraj Dhoopar	Won	
2019	Indian Television Academy Awards	Best Show (Popular)	Ekta Kapoor	Won	
2019	Indian Television Academy Awards	Best Actress (Popular)	Shraddha Arya	Nominated	
2022	Indian Television Academy Awards	Best Actor in Lead Role (Popular)	Dheeraj Dhoopar	Nominated	
2022	Indian Television Academy Awards	Best Actress in Lead Role (Popular)	Shraddha Arya	Nominated	
2022	Indian Television Academy Awards	Best Television Show - Fiction (Popular)	Ekta Kapoor	Nominated	
