= Mujhse Kuchh Kehti...Yeh Khamoshiyaan =

Indian television series

- Genre: Drama
- Written by: Salil Sand
- Directed by: Hemant Deodhar
- Country of origin: India
- Original language: Hindi
- No. of seasons: 1
- No. of episodes: 76

Production
- Producers: Sai Deodhar; Shakti Singh; Ila Bedi Datta
- Camera setup: Multi-camera
- Running time: 20–23 minutes
- Production companies: Trilogy Krikos and Thought Train Entertainment

Original release
- Network: Star Plus
- Release: 12 November 2012 – 23 February 2013

Mujhse Kuchh Kehti...Yeh Khamoshiyaan is an Indian television series on Star Plus. The serial stars Mrunal Thakur, Mrinal Kulkarni and Manit Joura in lead role.

== Plot ==
The story follows the journey of Gauri an NRI who is brought up at Southampton, near London. She is set to marry her childhood friend Siddharth and is eagerly expecting for her grandfather and her extended family to attend her wedding, whom she has never seen, living at Kolhapur in India. With them not showing up, she decides to travel to India secretly and find them. Soon before her marriage she leaves to India where she meets Garv meanwhile dark secrets of her family starts revealing. After a series of turns and events, soon after Siddharth calls off his marriage with Gauri just a day before, she marries Garv and the series ends.

== Cast ==
=== Main ===
- Mrunal Thakur as Gauri Bhosle Gaikwad
- Manit Joura as Garv Gaikwad
- Mohit Sehgal as Siddharth Kapoor

=== Recurring ===
- Mrinal Kulkarni as Pratiksha Bhosle
- Shruti Ulfat as Ashwini Bhosle
- Kabir Sadanand as Pratap Bhosle
- Ravindra Mankani as Jaywantrao "Appa Saheb" Bhosle
- Suhas Joshi as Ajji Saheb
- Suchitra Bandekar as Sumitra Bhosle
- Resham Tipnis as Asawari Gaikwad Bhosle
- Tushar Dalvi as Satyajeet "Satya" Bhosle
- Vibhuti Thakur as Amruta Bhosle Gaikwad
- Mayank Sharma as Prithviraj "Prithvi" Bhosle
- Aditi Asija as Nandita Bhosle
- Siddharth Chandekar as Jairaj Bhosle
- Sahil Sharma as Adityaraj "Adi" Bhosle
- Nirav Soni as Digvijay Gaikwad
- Falaq Naaz as Shivangi Gaikwad
- Utkarsha Naik as Rajlakshmi Gaikwad
- Rushali Arora as Seema Kapoor
- Farukh Saeed as Vikram Kapoor
- Sanjay Swaraj

== Production ==
=== Development ===
The series was supposed to premiere in August 2012 in an evening slot but was postpone due to unavailability of prime time slot as expected by production house. The series marked the debut of actors Shakti Anand and his wife Sai Deodhar as producers.

As a part of promotion before its premiere, the missing posters, advertisements and newspaper reports across cities stating "looking for Missing NRI girl Gauri Bhonsle" were circulated without revealing it being a series promotion then. Days after, it was revealed as a promotion for the series.

The series was filmed at Kolhapur in Maharashtra, India and London.

In January 2013, lead Mohit Segal quit the series.

=== Cancellation ===
Since its inception, the series failed to garner good ratings despite few changes in its plot and was off aired within three months on 23 February 2013.

== Reception ==
The series debuted with a good viewership ratings of 4.2 TVR however soon dropped down to 1.9 TVR as in second week of December 2012 and dropped further the following weeks.
