= Aalaap =

- Theatrical release poster
- Directed by: Manish Manikpuri
- Written by: Dilip Shukla
- Produced by: Nishant Tripathi; Abhishek Mishra; Jai Prakash Upadhyay
- Starring: Amit Purohit; Harsh Rajput; Aabid Shamim; Pitobash; Ruhi Chaturvedi; Rituparna Sengupta; Abhimanyu Singh; Raghubir Yadav; Omkar Das Manikpuri; Vijay Raaz; Murli Sharma
- Cinematography: Sunita Radia
- Edited by: Vikas Tiwari; Manish Manikpuri
- Music by: Agnee
- Distributed by: Shree Shankaracharya Arts Pvt Ltd
- Release date: 27 July 2012
- Country: India
- Language: Hindi

Aalaap is a 2012 Indian Hindi-language musical drama film directed by Manish Manikpuri. The film is set and shot in and around present day Chhattisgarh with the main protagonists being college students with a passion for music.

== Cast ==
- Amit Purohit as Rahul
- Pitobash Tripathy as Subhash
- Sunil Tiwari
- Harsh Rajput as Prashant
- Aabid Shamim as Brajesh
- Ruhi Chaturvedi
- Rituparna Sengupta as Bharti
- Omkar Das Manikpuri
- Raghubir Yadav
- Vijay Raaz as Bachchi bhaiyya
- Abhimanyu Singh
- Murli Sharma as Anna Reddy
- Aashish Patil
- Mohan Sagar
- Gamya Wijayadasa as item number "Chadhti Jawani"
- Kamesh Rao

== Production ==
=== Development ===
Aalaap is a Bollywood film produced under the banner of Shri Shankaracharya Arts Pvt. Ltd., Mumbai. The film which is based on youth and music has the potential to spread youth awareness across all corners of the nation. It has been jointly produced by renowned educationalists of Chhattisgarh Mr. Nishant Tripathi and Late Mr. Abhishek Mishra from SSCET group.

=== Casting ===
Raghubir Yadav, Ruhi Chaturvedi Vijay Raaz, Krishna Srivastava and Onkar Das Manikpuri were roped in initially. Manish Manikpuri cites that "casting is one of the film's strengths". Amit Purohit, Pitobash Tripathy, Harsh Rajput and Aabid Shamim, Mohan lal sagar play the lead roles. Miss Sri Lanka 2009, Gamya Wijayadasa is making her Bollywood debut with an item song called "Chadti Jawaani Mazedaar".

=== Filming ===
Aalaap has got a specific significance as it portrays the youth in the background of Chhattisgarh. It has been produced and directed by the people of Chhattisgarh's origin and major part of the shooting has been done in the Chhattisgarh state itself.

== Soundtrack ==
The music director of this film is Agnee with lyrics from Panchhi Jalonvi, K Mohan, Shailendra Singh Sodhi and Nawaldas Manikpuri. The first look of the song "Pa Paraa Paa" from the film has been revealed in a promo. Guitars and programming on all songs by Koco, additional Acoustic Guitar parts on all songs by K Mohan and bass Guitar on all songs by Among Jamir. All Songs mixed at YRF Studios by Shantanu Hudiker and Abhishek Khandelwal. All recordings at Nishaad, the Agnee Studio except Vocal recordings at YRF Studios & Audio Garage Studio.

#	Song	Singer(s)	Lyrics	Length
1	"Ek Nai Roshni"	K. Mohan; Back-up Vocals : Koco, Yamini Lavanian	Panchhi Jalonvi	4:08
2	"Dil Yeh Awaaz De"	Meera Shenoy & K Mohan; Back-up Vocals : Koco, Shruti Jakati & Parashar Joshi	Panchhi Jalonvi	5:31
3	"Paa Paraa Paa"	Nikhil D'Souza, Bonnie Chakraborty, Dhruv Shrikent (Druv Kent), K Mohan	K Mohan	5:13
4	"Soniye Soniye"	K Mohan	Shailendra Singh Sodhi (Shellee)	5:34
5	"Shuruaat Pyaar Ki"	Nikhil D'Souza, Yamini Lavanian	Panchhi Jalonvi	4:57
6	"Chadhti Jawani"	Bonnie Chakraborty, Kanika Joshi	Nawaldas Manikpuri	5:45
