= Mrinal Navell =

Indian television actress (born 2001)

- Born: Mrinal Navell Chandra; 24 May 2001 (age 25); Chamba, Himachal Pradesh, India
- Occupations: Actress, Model
- Years active: 2022–present
- Known for: Kundali Bhagya

Mrinal Navell Chandra (born 24 May 2001) is an Indian actress who predominantly works in the Hindi television and film industry.

== Early life and education ==
Mrinal Navell was born and brought up in Chamba, Himachal Pradesh. Her father is a government officer and mother is a professor.

She completed her schooling in Palampur and Chandigarh, and went to Delhi to complete her graduation from Ramjas College, Delhi University and post graduation in sociology from Indira Gandhi National Open University.

== Career ==
In 2022 she went to Mumbai and secured a role in the Star Plus TV serial Yeh Jhuki Jhuki Si Nazar, in which she played the role of Palki Mathur.

She was also seen in the web series Rakshak – India's Braves, which was released on Amazon Mini TV. Since June 2023, she portrayed one of the main character, Kavya Luthra in Zee TV's soap opera Kundali Bhagya till the show's conclusion in December 2024.

== Television ==
| Year | Serial | Role | Notes | Ref. |
|---|---|---|---|---|
| 2022 | Yeh Jhuki Jhuki Si Nazar | Palki Mathur | Supporting Role | |
| 2023–2024 | Kundali Bhagya | Kavya Luthra | Supporting Role | |
| 2025 | Mangal Lakshmi | Barkha Kapoor | Negative Role | |
