= Ankita Bhargava =

Indian actress

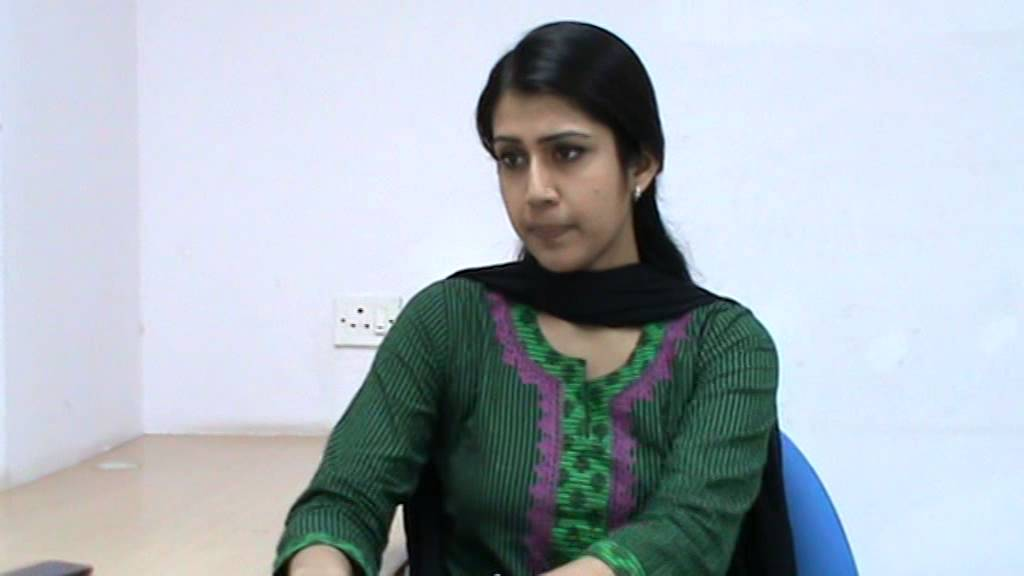
- Born: Ankita Bhargava; 17 August 1984 (age 41)
- Occupation: Actress
- Years active: 2002–present
- Spouse: Karan Patel (m. 2015)
- Children: 1
- Parent(s): Abhay Bhargava (father); Kiran Bhargava (mother)

Ankita Bhargava (born 17 August 1984) is an Indian television actress. She is known for playing Princess Unnati in Dekha Ek Khwaab, Latika in Ek Nayi Pehchaan, Shipra in Star Plus's Kasautii Zindagii Kay by Ekta Kapoor and many more television shows. She has done more than 50 ad films and has done prominent roles in films Akira (2016) and Action Jackson (2014).

== Personal life ==
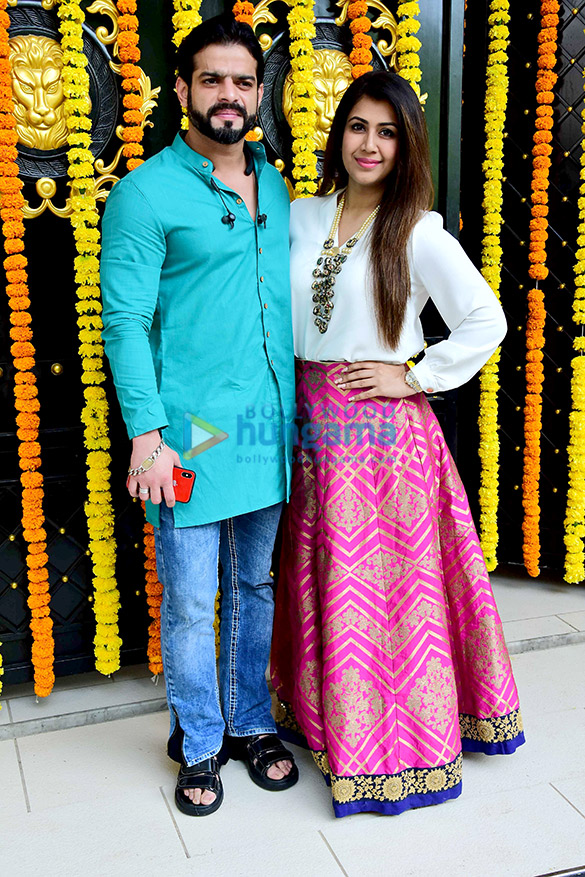
Ankita with her husband Karan Patel

Ankita married Karan Patel on 3 May 2015 in Mumbai. Their first child was born on 14 December 2019. She is daughter of television actors Abhay Bhargava and Kiran Bhargava.

== Career ==
Ankita appeared first in the 15th Episode of STAR Plus's series Sanjivani in 2002. She gained popularity for playing character Shipra in Star Plus's Kasautii Zindagii Kay by Ekta Kapoor.

== Television ==
Year	Show	Role	Ref
2002	Sanjivani	Episodic Role- Ep 15	
2006-2007	Kesar	Khushali	
2007	Kasautii Zindagii Kay	Shipra	
2008	Dill Mill Gayye	Ritu	
2009-2010	Yeh Pyar Na Hoga Kam		
2011	Mrs. Tendulkar	Priyanka	
2011	CID (Indian TV series)	Episodic Roles	
2011–2012	Dekha Ek Khwaab	Rajkumari Unnati (Uday's sister)	
2012	Sajda Tere Pyaar Mein	Malika	
2013	Ekk Nayi Pehchaan	Latika Suresh Modi	
2015	Reporters	Shreya Bhagat	
2015	Adaalat	Damini Shirodkar	
2016	Vidya Ek Kiran Ummeed Ki	Vidya	

== Filmography ==
Year	Name	Role	Ref
2011	Hum Do Anjaane	Muskan (main lead)	
2014	Action Jackson	Kushi's friend (supporting actor)	
2016	Akira	Shilpa Sharma (supporting actor)	
2023	Darran Chhoo		
