= Manit Joura =

Indian television actor (born 1987)

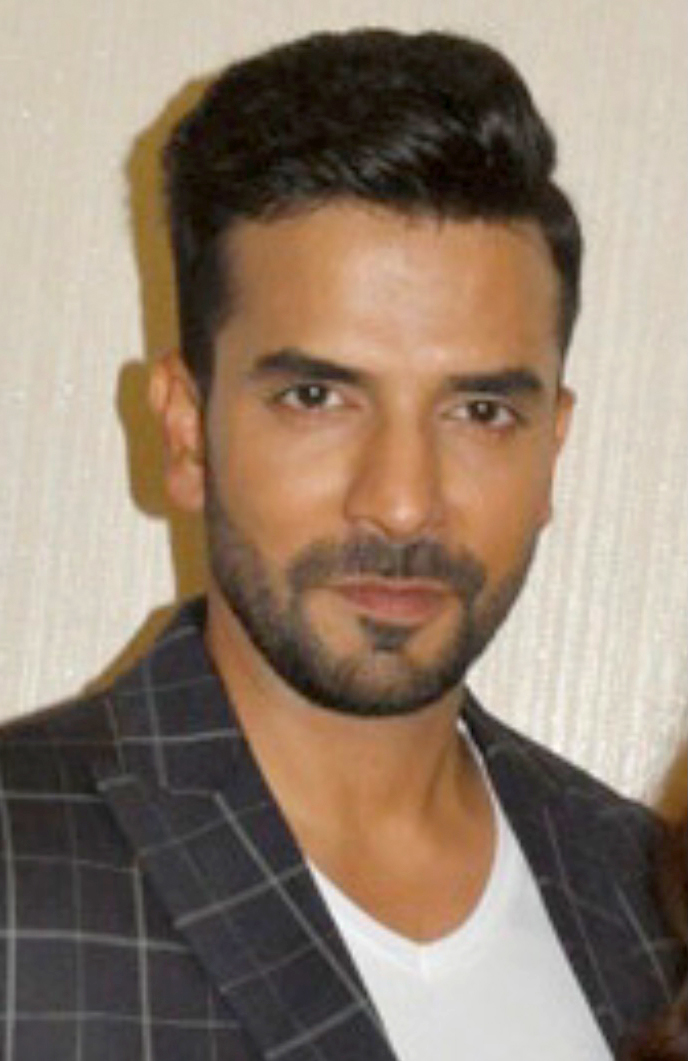
- Joura in 2018
- Born: 5 June 1987 (age 39); Delhi, India
- Occupation: Actor
- Years active: 2009–present
- Known for: SuperCops Vs Super Villains; Kundali Bhagya; Prem Bandhan; Naagin 6
- Spouse: Andria Panagiotopoulou (m. 2023)

Manit Joura (born 5 June 1987) is an Indian actor. He is known for his portrayal of Garv Shinde in Star Plus' Mujhse Kuchh Kehti...Yeh Khamoshiyaan, Jaywant Rane in Life OK's SuperCops Vs SuperVillains, Rishabh Luthra in Zee TV's Kundali Bhagya, and Harsh Shastri in Dangal's Prem Bandhan, later both of them are Ekta Kapoor's soap operas.

== Personal life ==
Joura married his Greek girlfriend, Andria Panagiotopoulou, a dance teacher, in a traditional Indian wedding ceremony at a heritage resort in Udaipur on 9 July 2023. The couple then held a second ceremony according to Greek rituals on 21 December 2023 in Greece.

== Career ==
Joura first appeared on television in 2008 as a contestant on Star Plus’s reality dance show Aaja Mahi Vay – Prem Ki Agni Pareeksha. He then appeared in television shows like Zee TV's 12/24 Karol Bagh and Ram Milaayi Jodi, and MTV India's Rush.

Joura made the transition from television to films with his debut in Yash Raj Films' Band Baaja Baaraat, directed by Maneesh Sharma. He also appeared in the German film The Girl With The Indian Emerald, directed by Michael Karen. He played the lead in Mujhse Kuchh Kehti...Yeh Khamoshiyaan on Star Plus.

From 2014 to 2016, he featured in Life OK's crime detective supernatural series SuperCops Vs SuperVillains in the role of Sub-Inspector Jaywant Rane.

In 2016, he appeared in the film Love Shagun.

In July 2017, he joined Zee TV's Kundali Bhagya as Rishabh Luthra and continued portraying the role until November 2021. He temporarily left the show but rejoined it in May 2022. However, he permanently quit the show in February 2024.

From 2020 to 2021, he was seen as Harsh Shastri, opposite Chhavi Pandey in Dangal's Prem Bandhan. From 2022 to 2023, he appeared in a recurring role in Colors TV's Naagin 6 as Professor Jeet Patel.

In March 2024, he joined Zee TV's Pyar Ka Pehla Naam: Radha Mohan as Yug Kohli. From September 2025 to October 2026, he played Dhairya Kumar in Colors TV's Mannat - Har Khushi Paane Ki.

== Filmography ==
=== Films ===
Year	Title	Role	Notes	Ref.
2010	Band Baaja Baaraat	Camera man		
2016	Love Shagun	Sandy		
2017	Solo	Alok	Malayalam/Tamil film	
2018	Falsafa: The Other Side	Aman		

=== Television ===
Year	Title	Role	Notes	Ref.
2009	12/24 Karol Bagh	Vicky		
2010–2011	Ram Milaayi Jodi	Goldie		
2012	Adaalat	Sujeet Gurumurthy	Episode 99-100	
2013	Mujhse Kuchh Kehti...Yeh Khamoshiyaan	Garv Shinde/Vikram Gaikwad		
2013, 2014–2016	SuperCops Vs SuperVillains	Rohit / Pranay / Dhavni Chor / Jaywant Rane	Played multiple roles	
2017–2021, 2022–2024	Kundali Bhagya	Rishabh Luthra		
2017, 2018	Kumkum Bhagya	Rishabh Luthra	Guest appearance	
2020–2021	Prem Bandhan	Harsh Shastri		
2022–2023	Naagin 6	Professor Jeet Patel		
2024	Pyar Ka Pehla Naam: Radha Mohan	Yug Kohli		
2025–2026	Mannat – Har Khushi Paane Ki	DCP Dhairya Kumar		

=== Web series ===
Year	Title	Role	Ref.
2017	First Among Equals	Unknown	
2018	The Test Case	Capt. Avinash Walia	
2019–2020	Baarish	Lawyer Manit Joura	
2023	Fuh Se Fantasy	Smaran / Rajinder	

=== Music videos ===
Year	Title	Singer	Ref.
2021	Tu Nahi Aayega	Rahul Jain	
