= Ruhi Chaturvedi =

Indian film and television actress

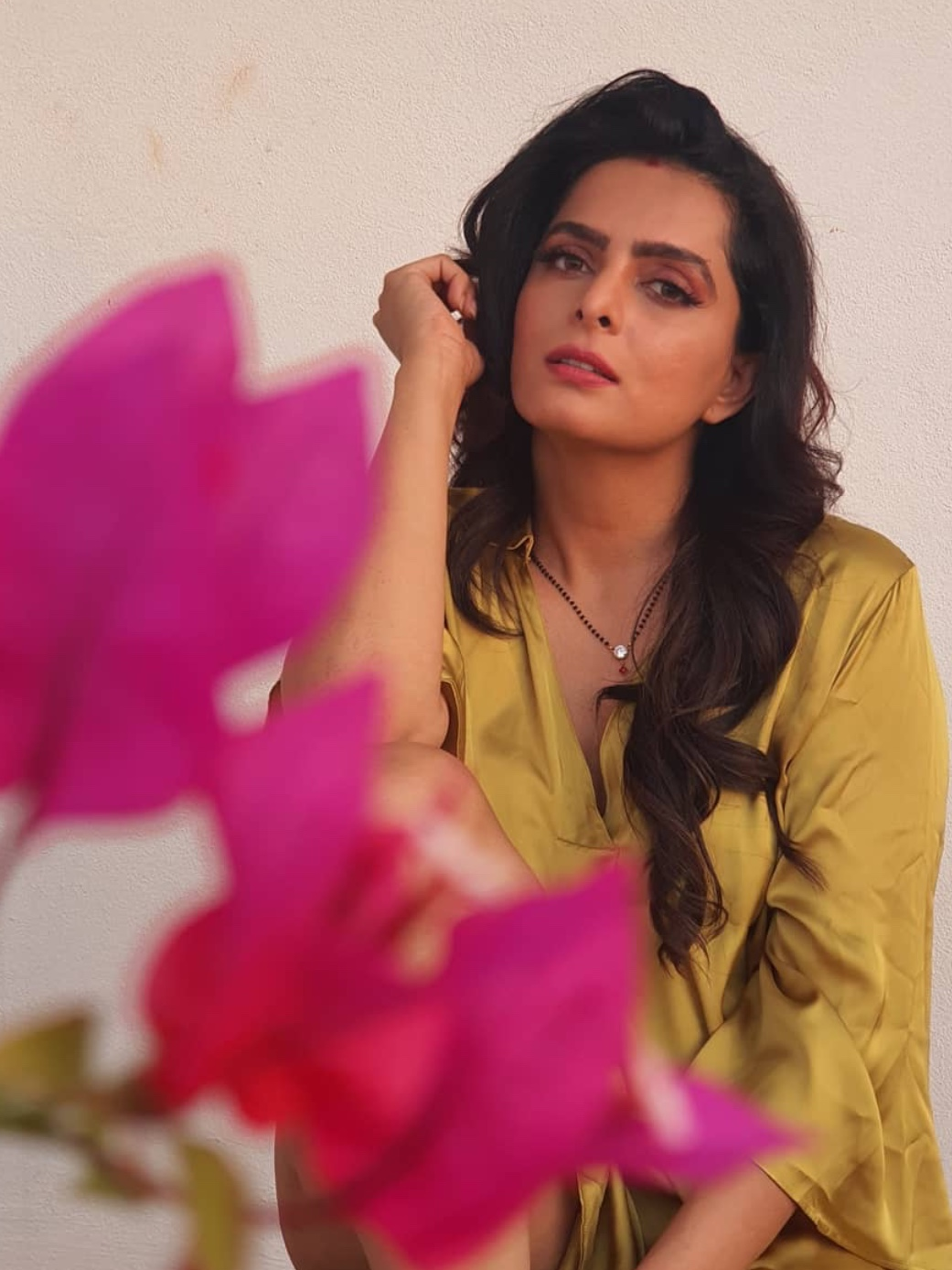
- Chaturvedi in 2021
- Born: 27 April 1993 (age 33); Jaipur, Rajasthan, India
- Occupation: Actress
- Years active: 2012–present
- Known for: Kundali Bhagya
- Spouse: Shivendraa Saainiyol (m. 2019)
- Children: 1

Ruhi Chaturvedi (born 27 April 1993) is an Indian model and actress best known for playing the Sherlyn Khurana in Ekta Kapoor's Kundali Bhagya.

== Career ==
Ruhi was a finalist of Miss India Worldwide 2010. She has modelled for Lakme Fashion Week, India Fashion Week, Rocky Star, JJ Valaya, Vikram Phadnis, Ritu Kumar and Ritu Beri.

Chaturvedi made her debut with a 2012 musical thriller film Aalaap.

In 2017, she came into limelight when she was seen as antagonist Sherlyn Khurana in Zee TV's Kundali Bhagya. In March 2023, she quit the series owing to a generation leap as she wanted to explore more as an actress.

In 2023, she participated in Colors TV's stunt-based reality show Fear Factor: Khatron Ke Khiladi 13, finishing in fourteenth place.

== Personal life ==
Ruhi Chaturvedi was born in Jaipur, Rajasthan. Her family hails from Mukundgarh, Jhunjhunu, Rajasthan. She completed her schooling from Divine Child School, Mumbai, and later pursued a major in History at Bhavan's College.

On 2 December 2019, Chaturvedi married her long-time boyfriend, Shivendraa Saainiyol, in a private ceremony. The couple welcomed their first child, a daughter, Dua, on 9 January 2025.

== Filmography ==
=== Films ===
Year	Title	Role	Ref.
2012	Aalaap	Sukriti	
2016	Kangana	Kangana	
2016	Pagdi	Neha	

=== Television ===
Year	Title	Role	Notes	Ref.
2017–2023; 2024	Kundali Bhagya	Sherlyn Khurana Malhotra		
2018; 2019	Kumkum Bhagya	Sherlyn Khurana Malhotra	Guest appearance	
2023	Fear Factor: Khatron Ke Khiladi 13	Contestant	14th place	
2026	Naagin 7			
