= Encounter (Indian TV series) =

- Directed by: Sudip Biswas
- Creative director: Surojit Adhikari
- Presented by: Professor Soumya Ghosh
- Starring: Manika Pal De; Parag Tyagi; Rajesh Shringarpure; Adaa Khan; Rohit Khurana; Shabaaz Abdullah Badi; Mishal Raheja; Mazher Sayed; Eijaz Khan; Kinshuk Mahajan; Samiksha Bhatt; Alan Kapoor; Kabir Khan; Piyush Sahdev; Manish Wadhwa; Vishal Karwal; Shaleen Malhotra; Mahhi Vij; Sara Khan; Sanjay Gagnani
- Country of origin: India
- Original language: Hindi
- No. of seasons: 1
- No. of episodes: 28 (list of episodes)

Production
- Running time: 43 minutes approximately
- Production company: Endemol India

Original release
- Network: Sony Entertainment Television
- Release: 11 April – 27 June 2014

Encounter is an Indian crime television series, produced by Endemol India for Sony Entertainment Television. Its central plot was based on 35 encounters in Mumbai over 35 one-hour episodes.

== Plot ==
The series was based on reality based crimes, which was made to trace the encounters that took place in different places of India and those which were in media headlines for months and later everyone forgot.

== Cast ==
- Manoj Bajpayee as Anchor
- Aditya Redij as Inspector Bhagat Dave
- Shalmalee Desai as Mrs. Bhagat Dave
- Parag Tyagi as Inspector Ajay Vishwas
- Shivani Manchanda as Ragini Ajay Vishwas
- Rajesh Shringarpure as Shankar "Shankya" Mane
- Shabaaz Abdullah Badi as Ujjwal
- Adaa Khan as Sonali
- Rohit Khurana as Shaikh Ali
- Pramod Moutho as Commissioner Lawrence Perreira
- Mishal Raheja as Inspector Nitin Kamte
- Megha Gupta as Dr. Preeti
- Mazher Sayed as Sub Inspector Manish Kadam
- Bikramjeet Kanwarpal as Assistant Police Commissioner Vikramjeet Shinde
- Prashant Narayanan as Shamsher Bhopali
- Avantika Hundal as Poonam
- Gopal Singh as Sikandar Bagdadi
- Eijaz Khan as Inspector Ali Rizvi
- Chetan Hansraj as Mangesh "Mangya" Waghmare
- Sushmita Daan as Razia Ali Rizvi
- Prakash Ramchandani as MLA Janak Shetty
- Kinshuk Mahajan as Inspector Vinod More
- Samiksha Bhatt as Malini Vinod More
- Kunal Bakshi as Sub Inspector Avinash Salunkhe
- Mahesh Shetty as Mahesh Murthy
- Vishal Nayak as Anand Murthy
- Manish Khanna as Babu Rode
- Rohit Roy as Senior Inspector Milind Mandlik
- Yuvraj Malhotra as Inspector Rizwan Mirza
- Murli Sharma as Katta Shridhar
- Alan Kapoor as Krishna
- Shresth Kumar as Amay
- Nandish Sandhu as Inspector Sartaj Qureshi
- Saurabh Dubey as Mr. Qureshi
- Sara Khan as Ayesha Raza
- Ravi Gossain as Kallan
- Vishal Karwal as Inspector Vikas Sawant
- Akshay Dogra as Ramya Narvekar
- Raj Singh Suryavanshi as Varun Surve
- Vishal Thakkar as Baburam Sawant
- Prithvi Zutshi as Police Commissioner Vijay Mohanty
- Raman Khatri as Ramesh Solanki
- Piyush Sahdev as Inspector Anil Barve
- Mita Vashisht as Maya Sinha
- Rohit Purohit as Girish Sinha
- Nidhi Jha as Geeta Sinha
- Neetha Shetty as Ritu Joshi
- Arup Pal as Police Commissioner Kapil Mhatre
- Himmanshoo A. Malhotra as Inspector Tilak Nambiyar
- Barkha Bisht as Urmila
- Parakh Madan as Sub Inspector Sapna
- Behzaad Khan as Ulhas
- Ruslaan Mumtaz as Inspector Praveen Joshi
- Raj Arjun as Dr. Roshan Lal
- Govind Khatri as Bhau
- Manini Mishra as Inspector Mita Gaekwad
- Mahhi Vij as Aashna
- Vinay Jain as Police Commissioner Surya Paneskar
- Alihassan Turabi as Bijoy
- Siraj Mustafa Khan as Fazlu
- Ganesh Hedge as Pasha
- Bhanu Uday as Inspector Praveen Waghle
- Manish Wadhwa as Hegde
- Arti Singh as Naina
- Kabir Khan as Dariyab Pathan
- Sanjay Gagnani as Inspector Farid Khan
- Siddharth Vasudev as Suhas Kariyappa Kunchenaad
- Puneet Vashisht as Vikas Kariyappa Kunchenaad
- Nikhil Arya as Inspector Ajay Karmakar
- Jignesh Mehta as Inspector Sudeep Sharma
- Pankaj Vishnu as Prasadrao Godse
- Rio Kapadia as Police Commissioner
- Shaleen Malhotra as Inspector Achal Kutty
- Hanif Hilal as Sharib Dabba
- Tushar Jha as Child Achal Kutty

== Episodes list ==
Episode number	Episode title	Telecast date
1	'Dongri ki Chowkdi' terrorizes Mumbai	11 April 2014
2	Police searches for gangster Shankya	12 April 2014
3	Shankya's Encounter	13 April 2014
4	Rise of the Killing Machine	18 April 2014
5	Sharp Shooter Shamsher's Encounter	19 April 2014
6	Story of Contract Killer Sikander Bagdadi	20 April 2014
7	The Police hunts down 'Mangya'	25 April 2014
8	Mangya's master plan	26 April 2014
9	Mangya's Encounter	27 April 2014
10	Mafia Queen - Part 1	2 May 2014
11	Mafia Queen - Part 2	3 May 2014
12	Unknown	4 May 2014
13	The rise of Mahesh Murthy	9 May 2014
14	Unknown	10 May 2014
15	Mahesh Murthy's Encounter	11 May 2014
16	Rise of the Byculla boys	16 May 2014
17	Babu gets killed	17 May 2014
18	Ramya's Encounter	18 May 2014
19	Katta Shiv - Part 1	23 May 2014
20	Katta Shiv - Part 2	24 May 2014
21	Katta Shiv - Part 3	25 May 2014
22	Sinha Family Gang	30 May 2014
23	Ulhas and Urmila's Revenge	1 June 2014
24	Aashna's shocking story	6 June 2014
25	Bollywood Extortions - Part 1	13 June 2014
26	Bollywood Extortions - Part 2	14 June 2014
27	A thrilling story of Kachra Pada Gang	20 June 2014
28	Story of Achal Kuty and Sharif Dabba	27 June 2014

== Reception ==
Throughout the globe, Encounter received mostly mixed to positive critical reception. The show has managed to make a mark with its storyline and presentation along with some brilliant casting.
