= Sanjay Gagnani =

Indian television and film actor (born 1988)

- Occupation: Actor
- Years active: 2010–present
- Known for: Kundali Bhagya
- Spouse: Poonam Preet Bhatia (m. 2021)

Sanjay Gagnani is an Indian television and film actor who predominantly works in Hindi-language television shows. He rose to prominence after portraying main antagonist in Ekta Kapoor's soap opera Kundali Bhagya (2017-2023) on Zee TV.

== Career ==
Gagnani has done many roles in Hindi television shows like Bairi Piya (2010), Hamari Devrani (2012), Encounter (2014), Veera (2015), Pyaar Ka The End (2013), Kundali Bhagya (2017), Fear Files: Darr Ki Sacchi Tasvirein (2014), Savdhaan India (2012) and Halla Bol (2014).

== Personal life ==
On 28 November 2021, Gagnani tied the knot with Indian model and actress, Poonam Preet Bhatia in New Delhi.

== Filmography ==
=== Films ===
Year	Title	Role	Notes	Ref(s)
2012	Rakhtbeej		Negative lead	
2012	Heroine	As film star		

=== Television ===
Year	Title	Role	Notes	Ref(s)
2010	Bairi Piya			
2011	Hamari Devrani			
2011	Hamari Saas Leela			
2012–2013	Ek Veer Ki Ardaas...Veera			
2012	Savdhaan India			
2013–2014	Pyaar Ka The End			
2014	Halla Bol			
2014	Fear Files: Darr Ki Sacchi Tasvirein			
2014	Encounter	Inspector Farid Khan		
2015	Aahat		Season 6	
2016–2017	Ek Rishta Saajhedari Ka	Vaibhav Mittal		
2016–2017	Savdhaan India			
2017	C.I.D.	Rocky/Rohit		
2017–2023	Kundali Bhagya	Prithvi Malhotra	Negative lead	
2017–2018	Kumkum Bhagya	Prithvi Malhotra	Guest appearance	
2020	Naagin 4	Prateek	Cameo	
2022	Naagin 6	Mahasapera (Snake charmer)	Cameo	

== Accolades ==
Year	Award	Award	Work	Ref.
2019	Gold Awards	Best Actor in a Negative Role	Kundali Bhagya	
