= Kiran Bhargava =

Indian television actress

- Occupation: Actress
- Years active: 1997 - present
- Spouse: Abhay Bhargava
- Children: Ankita Bhargava Patel

Kiran Bhargava is an Indian television actress. She is known for playing acting roles in television serials such as Zanjeerein, Lakeerein and Kumkum Bhagya etc.

== Personal life ==
Kiran is the mother of actress Ankita Bhargava Patel and mother in law of Karan Patel.

== Career ==
She played Daljeet Kohli (Ranbir's grandmother) in Kumkum Bhagya, and Premlata Shastri in Prem Bandhan. She is a professional Kathak dancer trained under Padma Vibhushan Pandit Birju Maharaj since 1976.

== Filmography ==
=== Television ===
Year	Show	Channel	Role
1997-1998	Zanjeerein	Zee TV	
1998-1999	Lakeerein	Zee TV	
1998-2000	Nyay	DD Metro	
2001-2003	Shagun	Star Plus	
2000	Arth	Zee TV	
2002	Piya Ka Ghar		
2003	Dahleez	DD National	
2006-2009	Stree Teri Kahani	DD National	
2005	Sati	Sahara One	
2007	Main Teri Parchhain Hoon		
2008	Sujata		
2009	Bhagyavidhaata	Colors	
2010	Agle Janam Mohe Bitiya Hi Kijo		
2011	Saas Bina Sasural	Sony TV	
2012	Yahan Main Ghar Ghar Kheli	Zee TV	
2012	Dil Se Di Dua... Saubhagyavati Bhava?	Life Ok	
2012	Diya Aur Baati Hum	Star Plus	
2013	Rishton Ke Bhanwar Mein Uljhi Niyati	Sahara One	
2014	Itti si khushi	Sony TV	
2016	Meri Saasu Maa	Zee TV	
2017	Yeh Hai Mohabbatein	StarPlus	Shobha Venkatesh
2019-2022	Kumkum Bhagya	Zee TV	Daljeet Kohli (Dida)
2023	Prem Bhandan	Dangal TV	Premlata Shastri
2020	Naagin 5	Colors TV	Jay's Grandmother
2021–2023	Sindoor Ki Keemat	Dangal	Annapoorna Awasthi
2024–2025	Apollena – Sapno Ki Unchi Udann	Colors TV	Damyanti Shukla
2026–present	Vasudha	Zee TV	Santosh
