= Amit Purohit =

Indian actor (1987–2019)

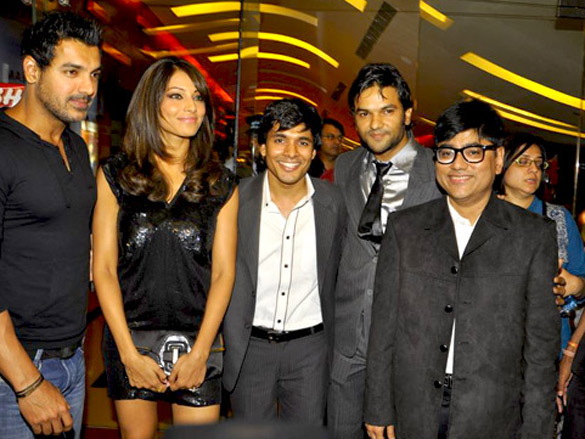
- Born: 10 February 1987
- Died: 9 July 2019 (aged 32)
- Occupation: Film actor

Amit Purohit (10 February 1987 – 9 July 2019) was an Indian film actor. He appeared in several Hindi and Telugu films. His last film was Sammohanam with Sudhir Babu and Aditi Rao Hydari. He was engaged to actress and model Supriya Keshri.

== Filmography ==
- Shobhana 7 Nights
- Sammohanam (2018 film)
- Aalaap (film)
- Pankh (film)
- Bijuka
