= Pankh =

- Directed by: Sudipto Chattopadhyaya
- Written by: Sudipto Chattopadhyaya, Varun Gautam
- Produced by: Sanjay Gupta
- Starring: Bipasha Basu; Maradona Rebello; Lilette Dubey; Mahesh Manjrekar; Ronit Roy; Sanjeeda Sheikh; Amit Purohit
- Cinematography: Somak Mukherjee
- Edited by: Sanjib Datta, Bunty Nagi
- Music by: Raju Singh
- Distributed by: Eros Entertainment
- Release date: 2 April 2010
- Running time: 90 minutes
- Country: India
- Language: Hindi
- Budget: ₹55 Million INR
- Box office: ₹2.025 Million INR

Pankh (transl. Wings) is a 2010 Bollywood film written and directed by Sudipto Chattopadhyaya and starring Bipasha Basu, Lilette Dubey, Mahesh Manjrekar, Ronit Roy, Sanjeeda Sheikh and newcomers Maradona Rebello and Amit Purohit. The film was released on 2 April 2010. The film is reportedly based on the case of child actor Ahsaas Channa, who's a girl who was passed off as a boy in movies like Kabhi Alvida Naa Kehna and Vaastu Shastra, and also based on South-Indian actress Sujitha, who has appeared as a boy in movies during her initial career as a child artist.

== Plot ==
The film is about a child artist who played female roles in films as Baby Kusum. As an adult, he wants to play hero roles. Baby Kusum is actually a boy, masquerading as a girl. He was named Jerry, and then renamed as Master Jai for the movies. He and his mother, Mary (Lilette) have a turbulent relationship. The boy's family is poor and wants to make it big. His parents put pressure on him and ridicule him. He becomes a drug addict who spends all his time at home. Eventually, he creates an imaginary character he is in love with named Nandini [Bipasha Basu] who taunts him, fights with him, and questions his every move. Jerry is made to face the camera again as a young man, which leads to the final catastrophe. The film highlights the common practice in the Indian film industry of casting children in roles contrary to their natural genders.

== Cast ==
- Bipasha Basu — Nandini
- Lilette Dubey — Mary
- Mahesh Manjrekar — producer
- Maradona Rebello — Jerry Dacunha
- Amit purohit — Salim
- Ronit Roy — director
- Sanjeeda Sheikh — Kusum

== Production ==
=== Development ===
Initially, Sudipto Chattopadhyaya narrated the script to Rohit Roy but he refused the film. Then he went to Sanjay Gupta who after a 20-minute narration signed him for the film. According to an interview with Times of India Chattopadhyaya drew inspiration from a documentary titled Children Of The Silver Screen by Dilip Ghosh in which child artistes are interviewed as adults and expressed their trauma. The protagonist Jerry, always imagines Bipasha to be a diva and director, Sudipto Chattopadhyay, who has styled the actress’ look in the movie, says that this idea was executed by Rocky S and Gavin Miguel. Rocky wanted Bips to look like two divas - Sophia Loren and Liza Minnelli from ‘Cabaret’. Bipasha reportedly cut her hair for a song, as the wig didn't fit her.

=== Casting ===
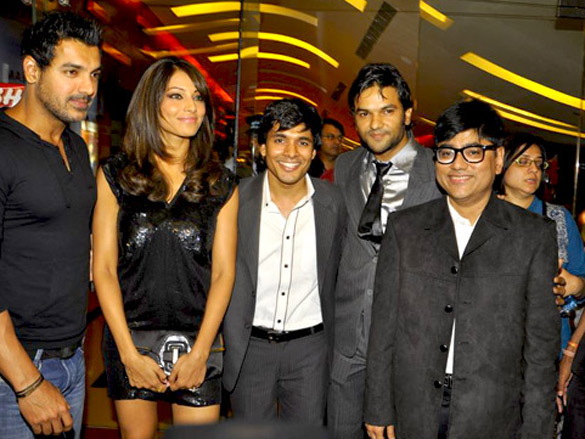
Cast of Pankh at the premiere.

Bipasha Basu plays an imaginary character who exists in the protagonist Jerry's (Maradona Rebello) mind. Bipasha said that she consented to do the role after one narration of the script. Newcomer Maradona Rebello was picked to play the character of Jerry after auditioning 250 candidates. He freaked out after hearing the script and Sudipto had to make him and his parents understand the story and convince them. He had to do the same for his other lead Amit Purohit who plays Salim. Bipasha reportedly does not want to use her real name in the film. The movie also has Mahesh Manjrekar making a comeback as an actor. Producer Sanjay Gupta says "I gave Mahesh Manjrekar pivotal roles in my ‘Kaante’ and ‘Musafir’. I think he’s a really good actor. And if one has to choose between Mahesh Manjrekar the actor and the director I’d go for the former" Sanjeeda Sheikh of Nach Baliye 3 fame was chosen for a character who is less than 17 years old.

=== Promotion ===
A 1-minute promo shot was released for the movie in January 2008. It shows the essence of the film, a little boy being readied for the film and when he emerges he's a child actress Baby Kusum. It then shows the boy grown up as a young man - a dropout-drug-addict. As he struggles to discover his true self, he is shown rebelling against his mother and getting violent with whoever tries to get close to him. Bipasha appears in the last few seconds of the promo and is shown as the alter ego of Maradona.

== Music ==
Pankh

Soundtrack album by Raju Singh
- Released: 2009
- Genre: Film soundtrack
- Producer: Sanjay Gupta

Raju Singh chronology
Raaz – The Mystery Continues (2008)	Pankh (2009)	Karma, Confessions and Holi (2009)

Newcomer Raju Singh directs the music for the movie. Singer Sunidhi Chauhan has reportedly sung the song "Jiya Jala Na" where Bipasha seduces Maradona.
