= Prem Bandhan (TV series) =

Indian television series

- Genre: Drama; Family; Romance
- Created by: Ekta Kapoor
- Written by: Dheeraj Sarna
- Screenplay by: Nikita Dhond; Sambhav Khetarpal
- Story by: Srinita Bhoumick
- Directed by: Vikram Ghai
- Creative director: Annu Kaur
- Starring: Chhavi Pandey; Manit Joura
- Theme music composer: Nawab Arzoo; Binod Ghimire
- Opening theme: Prem Bandhan opening theme
- Country of origin: India
- Original language: Hindi
- No. of seasons: 1
- No. of episodes: 166

Production
- Producers: Ekta Kapoor; Shobha Kapoor
- Cinematography: Dinesh Singh; Alamgir Shaikh
- Editors: Vikas Sharma; Vishal Sharma
- Camera setup: Multi-camera
- Running time: 22–25 minutes
- Production company: Balaji Telefilms

Original release
- Network: Dangal
- Release: 30 November 2020 – 9 June 2021

Related
- Koshish - Ek Aashaa

Prem Bandhan (transl. The Bond of Love) is an Indian dramatic television series which aired from 30 November 2020 to 9 June 2021 on Dangal. Produced by Ekta Kapoor for Balaji Telefilms, it stars Chhavi Pandey and Manit Joura.

== Plot ==
Janki agrees to an arranged marriage at the insistence of her father. Not meeting the groom before their wedding night, she discovers that he is mentally challenged and is at an eight-year-old level. Janki realizes she has been tricked into marrying him by her in-laws, but hesitates to endanger her father's health by telling him. Harsh (her husband) is childlike, which annoys her. Despite their marriage's rocky start, however, Janki and Harsh become close.

Janki's brother learns about the situation, and wants Janki to return home. Harsh and Janki want to stay together, however, and she consults a doctor to help him. Janki becomes suspicious that someone in the family does not want Harsh to improve, despite their surface affection. Harsh receives a head injury, for which Janki is blamed.

She wants to protect Harsh from his stepmother Savita, who is responsible for his mental instability and killed his grandfather to acquire his property for herself and her children (Rajesh, Shekhar and Roohi). Janki decides to celebrate their three-month anniversary with Harsh in Darbhanga, only telling Savita. They have an accident on the way, but both survive. Harsh needs a kidney transplant, and Janki donates one of her kidneys. Harsh awakens with no memory of the past five years, and does not recognize Janki. He remembers his love for Shweta (his old girlfriend), and Janki does not want to come between them at first. Advised by Rangili (a friend), she refuses to sign divorce papers sent by her father-in-law and decides to save Harsh from Shweta and Savita.

Shweta tries to kill Harsh, and Janki comes home; her father-in-law tries to stop her. Harsh keeps Shweta from slapping Janki, remembering that she saved his life. Janki has allies in Shekhar, Harsh's grandmother and his sister-in-law. Savita schemes to make it appear that Harsh had sex with Shweta to pressure him into marrying her, and his father wants them to marry.

Harsh develops feelings for Janki. On Mahashivratri, Janki's name appears on a ritual invitation instead of Shweta's. Janki's in-laws ask her to leave the house, but Harsh stops her. She prepares the mehndi, but Savita poisons it and Janki is blamed; her father-in-law has her arrested. Shekhar bails Janki out; she refuses to return home, and is kidnapped by a moneylender who threatens to sell her unless Savita's debt is paid.

Janki stops Harsh and Shweta's wedding; she knocks Shweta out, disguises herself and marries him. Harsh thinks she married him for money, but stops Shweta from killing her. Rajesh has false papers saying that Janki married Harsh for money, and Harsh orders Janki out; she burns the papers as she leaves.

Janki goes to the hospital where Harsh was born, and a nurse tells her about Harsh and why Savita wanted to kill him. She is attacked by Savita and Rajesh, who put her in a box and bury her.

Six months later, Harsh still loves Janki but has been forced to marry Shweta. Rajesh has mortgaged the resort to the owner of J Industries, Jaya Kapoor. They meet with Jaya, who looks like Janki; Janki was saved by Akshay, who helps her avenge Savita and Rajesh. Savita and Rajesh realise the error of their ways, and the family reunites.

== Cast ==
=== Main ===
- Chhavi Pandey as Janki Srivastava Shastri/ Jaya Kapoor: Harsh's wife; Nitin and Nisha's sister; Brij's daughter from his first marriage; Asha's stepdaughter (2020–2021)
- Manit Joura as Harsh Shastri: Janki's mentally challenged husband; Ram's son with his mistress; Savita's stepson; Rajesh's younger brother (step brother); Roohi and Shikhar's stepbrother (2020–2021)

=== Recurring ===
- Reyaansh Vir Chadha as Akshay Malhotra (2021)
- Ariah Agarwal as Shweta: Harsh's fiancé; appointed by Savita to ruin Janki's life (2021)
- Utkarsha Naik as Savita Shastri: Harsh's stepmother; Rajesh, Shikhar and Roohi's mother; Ram's wife. She caused Harsh's illness and is behind Shastri family's troubles, who is behind the family's wealth. She is greedy and ruthless. (2020–2021)
- Vineet Kumar Chaudhary as Rajesh Shastri: Ram's eldest son with Savita; Vandana's husband; Harsh's elder brother; Shikhar and Roohi's elder brother (2020–2021)
- Monica Khanna as Vandana Shastri: Rajesh's wife (2020–2021)
- Bakul Thakkar as Ram Shastri: Harsh, Rajesh, Shikhar and Roohi's father; Savita's husband (2020–2021)
- Saarvi Omana as Nisha Shrivastava: Janki and Nitin's sister (2020–2021)
- Madhu Bala Atri as Nurse: Cares for Harsh (2021)
- Amit Singh Thakur as Brij Mohan Srivastava: Nisha, Janki and Nitin's father (2020–2021)
- Tushar Dhembla as Nitin Srivastava: Nisha's brother; Janki's stepbrother (2020–2021)
- Aman Gandhi as Shikhar Shastri: Harsh's younger stepbrother; Rajesh and Roohi's brother; Ram and Savita's younger son (2020–2021)
- Avantika Chaudhary as Roohi Shastri: Harsh's younger stepsister; Rajesh and Shikhar's sister; Ram and Savita's only daughter (2020–2021)
- Kiran Bhargava as Premlata Shastri: Harsh, Rajesh, Shikhar and Roohi's grandmother; Ram's mother (2020–2021)
- Ruma Majini as Asha Shrivastava: Janki's stepmother; Nitin and Nisha's mother (2020–2021)
- Vedant Sharan/Ankit Vyas as Ashok: Jankee's ex-fiancé (2020)
- Mohit Hiranandani as Amit (2021)
- Manoj Kumar Patel as Rangeli (2020–2021)
- Kush Sharma
- Krishna Kant Singh Bundela as Tantrik

== Production ==
The series was initially entitled Koshish - Rishton Ki. The initial storyline of the show is adapted from Zee TV's 2000 drama series Koshish - Ek Aashaa, which was too produced by Balaji Telefilms. The series' first trailer was released on 14 November 2020 with Chhavi Pandey, a deepak in her hand. The series' first promo was released on 22 November 2020. The series premiered on 30 November 2020 on Dangal TV and aired from Monday to Saturday at 7:30 pm. On 27 April 2021 the timeslot of the series was changed to 10 pm IST. From 28 March 2021, entire episodes of the show were streaming on YouTube. The series wrapped up its shoot in June and the last episode was broadcast on 12 June 2021.

=== Casting ===
Manit Joura was selected by producer Ekta Kapoor to play male protagonist in the series, Harsh Shastri. Joura stated, "This role is radically different from all the other shows that I have done so far. Here I need to play a character that doesn’t come easy to me, I need to work on it, so to play this character is tough!"

Chhavi Pandey was cast to play the female protagonist 'Janvi Srivastava' in the show. On her role, Chhavi stated, "The character of Janvi is simple and loving girl yet strong and independent. She belongs to a middle-class family and has a lot of responsibilities of her family but never cribs about it. She can do anything to make her family happy. Her character will be very relatable to the girls in small towns!"

Mohit Hiranandani was brought in to play male antagonist whereas Ariah Agarwal was cast as the female antagonist in the show. On her role, Ariah stated,"I loved that Shweta is out and out negative. She is completely a mean girl. I was always fascinated by such roles and wanted to try playing one."
