= Shobhana 7 Nights =

Shobhna's Seven Nights
- Directed by: Sudipto Chattopadhyay
- Written by: Sudipto Chattopadhyay
- Produced by: Abhishek Mishra
- Starring: Raveena Tandon; Amit Purohit; Rohit Roy
- Music by: Gourov Dasgupta
- Release date: 2012
- Running time: 105 minutes
- Country: India
- Language: Hindi

Shobhna's 7 Nights is a 2012 Indian film directed by Sudipto Chattopadhyaya. The film stars Raveena Tandon and Rohit Roy. Tandon plays the title role of author and socialite who engages in an affair with a younger Bollywood actor. The film won Raveena tandon the Best Actress Award at the Indian Film Festival of Houston.

== Cast ==
- Raveena Tandon as Shobhna
- Rohit Roy as Amar
- Nataliya Kozhenova as Alex
- Amit Purohit as Saahil
- Lillete Dubey as Malishka
- Anupam Kher as Davidar
- Bharat Kaul as Chattopadhyay

== Production ==
Tandon was the first choice for the part, which she initially turned down as it was too bold. Her part was said to be based on Shobhaa De. Tandon later accepted the part and called it "very contrary to the cliched Hindi film heroine. It's bold in its character and has no justifications". She appeared in a Sufi song. According to Sudipto, "Raveena's character 'Shobhana 7 nights' bears a close resemblance to some of the high society authors and columnists in Mumbai and is bold and sensual, sure to raise eyebrows."

== Release ==
The film was screened at several award festivals, including the Indian Festival of Houston, where Tandon won a special recognition trophy for Outstanding Performance. The film did not have a theatrical release.
