= Jaadu Teri Nazar – Daayan Ka Mausam =

Indian TV series

- Genre: Supernatural; Thriller; Mystery; Drama; Romance
- Created by: Gul Khan
- Based on: Daayan folklore
- Screenplay by: Prateek Dadheesh
- Directed by: Afzal Sayyed
- Starring: Khushi Dubey; Zayn Ibad Khan; Aditi Sharma; Monalisa
- Country of origin: India
- Original language: Hindi
- No. of seasons: 1
- No. of episodes: 166

Production
- Executive producers: Akbar Shaikh; Sandesh Sharma
- Producers: Gul Khan; Karishma Jain
- Production location: Film City, Mumbai
- Cinematography: Umesh Pandey; Roshan Lal
- Editor: Shashank H Singh
- Camera setup: Multi-camera
- Running time: 26 minutes
- Production company: 4 Lions Films

Original release
- Network: StarPlus
- Release: 18 February – 4 August 2025

Related
- Yehh Jadu Hai Jinn Ka!; Nazar

Jaadu Teri Nazar – Daayan Ka Mausam is an Indian supernatural thriller series produced by Gul Khan under 4 Lions Films. It premiered on StarPlus from 18 February 2025 to 4 August 2025. It streams digitally on JioHotstar. It stars Khushi Dubey, Zayn Ibad Khan and Monalisa in lead roles.

== Plot ==
A Daayan named Kaamini gives birth to a child fathered by Ravikant Pratap Singh and proclaims him as "Daavansh", the one who holds the key to her immortality. Meanwhile, a girl is born as a "Reevavanshi", the chosen one destined to destroy the Daavansh and the entire Daayan community. A wise woman (Prathamvanshi) from "Prathamvansh" prophesies that this girl will bring about their downfall.

Fearing for her daughter's safety, the girl's mother names her Gauri, strips her of her powers, and buries them, knowing they will return to her when the time is right. To protect Gauri from the Daayans, she entrusts her to the river, believing that divine forces will safeguard her. Enraged, Kaamini kills Gauri's parents.

Meanwhile, Ravikant invites Kaamini to meet their son, Vihaan, but his wife, Veena Pratap Singh, seizes the baby and escapes using magical crystals given by the Reevavanshis. In revenge, Kaamini kills Ravikant. However, Veena manages to trap Kaamini, turning her into a statue using the magical crystals. Before being petrified, Kaamini warns that her son, Vihaan, will inherit her powers and one day resurrect her. Veena raises Vihaan as her own, determined to protect him from his dark destiny.

Gauri, on the other hand, is found and adopted by a poor man whose wife, Rekha, refuses to accept her. Gauri grows up unaware of her powers and becomes the breadwinner of the family as a taxi driver. Rekha, who works as a dancer at wedding halls, pressures Gauri to follow in her footsteps, but Gauri dreams of independence and wants her intelligent foster sister, Charu, to study at a prestigious college.

Vihaan, aware of his powers but unable to control them, wears a bangle infused with magical crystals to suppress them. He longs to uncover the truth about his abilities, but Veena is determined to keep him in the dark.

On the night of Kaal Sapt Grahan, Vihaan senses that his powers will surge and leaves home. However, one of the Tridayans— three powerful Daayans tied to the Kaal Vriksha— attacks him. Vihaan narrowly escapes and crosses paths with Gauri. Overwhelmed by his uncontrolled powers, he accidentally harms her. As soon as the Kaal Sapt Grahan ends, he erases her memory and disappears. But his bangle is left with Gauri. Later when she goes to Vihaan's house to return it, she is insulted by Veena about her job.

For saving his family from the evil continuous haunts of Daayan, Vihaan forcefully marries Gauri. Sunehri, an evil Dayan knowing the truth of Gauri as a Rishwa, tries to kill her. But failed in her attempt. At a time, Vihaan enslaved her and Gauri unknown of her powers kills Sunehri. Vihaan and family think that Vihaan killed the dayan and he erases Gauri's memory again.

Subsequently Gauri falls in love with Vihaan and not able to confess it. Gauri's Rakshini (Siya) and Bhavishyta (Charu) are introduced. The Maha Dayan Kaamini's arrival brings fear and shock within the Singhs'. Kamini subdued Vihaan and tries to convert him into Davansh. She tries her best but failed by Gauri. Gauri is revealed as Rishwa and by the help of Rish Dhanush, she kills Kaamini.

Gauri is in coma. Vihaan is given an appearance by Lord Shiva and he is not Davansh any more. He prays for Gauri and she is out of coma. Gauri is welcomed by the family. Later on, Kaamini's spirit reveals the death of her parents. Gauri with the help off magical ring sees that Veena was the one who told the way to her parents to Kaamini. Gauri questions Veena but she denies. Infuriated Vihaan throws Gauri out of his house. In parallel scenes, a Vihaan's parallel self is shown as evil minded and a dayan with fire as a magic revealed as Gauri's twin sister named Kesar is shown. She does not have control of her powers. Her life resides in a woodpecker enslaved by her evil guardians.

Vihaan stays with Gauri at her tenement after she refuses to go to his house. Later, a sinister force sent by Daavansh Vihaan draws Gauri into Pratham Tantra. Maha Daayan Mohana awakens, seeking revenge for Kamini's death and posing a threat to Vihaan's family. Later, Gauri uses her powers to protect Vihaan from Mohana's attack. Daavansh constantly follows Kesar and eventually saves her from the villagers by marrying her. But in reality it was his trap for her to become more powerful, the more powerful he becomes the more weak Vihaan would feel. Gauri along with Arjun tries to find Davaansh and succeeds. Daavansh along with Kesar completes his marriage rituals under the Prathamvriksh to expand his powers. Gauri tries to kill him and sends Arjun to prevent Kesar from offering flowers to the well.

Mohana sends Betalini to kill Vihaan but she failed. Kesar is shown to know the truth of Daavansh and tries to kill him. But using the dark thread Daavansh reunites with Vihaan as himself as dominant one. Gauri to save Vihaan and her family sacrifices her Rishwa powers in form of Rishwa mani to Mohana. Kesar is killed by Mohana, and she took all her fire powers to kill her elder sister Rishwa. Betalini who is in love with Harsh helps him to know the dark plans of Mohana. He alerted the whole family and Gauri about it. Prathamvanshi alerted Gauri that on the 25th birthday of Vihaan on completing the death rituals of his family and then Rishwa he would completely be converted to Daavansh. Gauri tries to find her powers. Eventually, Daavansh started the rituals. Gauri with the help of Prathamvanshis delay the rituals and prevent the earth from destruction. Later on, Harsh, Siya and Arjun found that the ring of Kesar given by her to Harsh while dying that belonged to her sister would itself find the new owner. Gauri while fighting with Mohana gets injured and gets owned by the ring. In her dream she was explained everything by Kesar. Gauri gets new powers of Rishwa mani and kills Mohana. On the other side, Vihaan killed the other family members and was on the way to kill Gauri. Gauri and Siya were heartbroken when they saw the dead bodies of family members. Gauri decided to fight against the Daavansh using her powers. Later Gauri surrenders herself to Daavansh and Daavansh hurts her using Agnishastra. Gauri during her exile to death brings back the Vihaan and Daavansh disappears. Siya brings back the life of every family member using the ring of Reevavanshies. Then they found that Gauri was going to die. She creates a shield so that nobody could halt her from dying. Then Gauri falls off from the cliff and presumed to be died by everyone.

Three years later, on the birthday of Vihaan, family decides to organise a party but saddened Vihaan destroys it and recalls the memory of Gauri. Gauri is still alive living in a hut far away from Vihaan. She has a toddler of her and Vihaan who has all Daavansh powers. Mohana and other Daayans are in search of him, but he fools all of them.

== Cast ==
=== Main ===
- Khushi Dubey as Gauri Sharma Pratap Singh: A former Rishwa and taxi driver; Vedika's daughter; (2025)
- Zayn Ibad Khan in dual roles as:
  - Vihaan Pratap Singh: A former Daavansh; College professor; Ravikant and Kaamini’s son; (2025)
  - Daavansh: Vihaan's dark alter ego; A Daavansh; Kesar's husband (2025)
- Jishiv Bhanushali as Golu Pratap Singh: A Daavansh; Vihaan and Gauri ‘s son (2025)
- Monalisa as Mohana: A Maha Daayan; Kamini's elder sister (2025)

=== Recurring ===
- Amardeep Jha as Prathamvanshi (2025)
- Ayush Shrivastava as ACP Harsh Pratap Singh: A police officer; Rashmi and Mahesh’s son (2025)
- Anmol Kajani as Arjun Pratap Singh: Mahesh and Rashmi's son (2025)
- Srishti Singh as Siya: A snakeshifter and a Rakshini; Harsh's love-interest (2025)
- Vaidehi Nair as Sandhya Pratap Singh: Rashmi and Mahesh's daughter (2025)
- Dishi Duggal as Mrs. Pratap Singh "Dadi": Ravikant and Mahesh's mother (2025)
- Sanchi Daundkar as Charu: A Bhavishyata; Rekha's daughter (2025)
- Aarti Kulkarni as Rekha: A dancer; Charu's mother (2025)
- Sushil Kumar as Mahesh Pratap Singh; Ravikant's younger brother (2025)
- Monica Gupta as Rashmi Pratap Singh: Mahesh's wife (2025)
- Nikita Mukherjee as Veena Pratap Singh; Ravikant's widow; Vihaan’s stepmother (2205)
- Priyanjali Uniyal as Betty: A Daayan; Harsh's one-sided lover (2025)
- Vishakha Khatri as A Daayan (2025)
- Arsheen Namdar as Sunehri: A Daayan (2025)
- Sonyaa Ayodhya as Urvi: A Daayan; Vihaan's ex fiance (2025)
- Geeta Tyagi as Sharda: Veena's elder sister-in-law (2025)
- Tripti Aggarwala as Rudrani: Gauri's grandmother (2025)

=== Cameos ===
- Sumbul Touqeer as Vedika: A Reevavanshi; Gauri and Kesar's mother (2025)
- Shrenu Parikh / Barkha Bisht as Kamini: A Daayan and dancer; Vihaan's mother (2025)
- Siddharth Dhawan as Ravikant Pratap Singh: Veena's husband; Vihaan's father; Mahesh's brother (2025)
- Aditi Sharma as Kesar: Agni Daayan; Vedika's daughter; Gauri's biological sister (2025)

=== Guest appearances ===
- Bhavika Sharma as IPS Savi Chavan Thakkar from Ghum Hai Kisikey Pyaar Mein in Manoranjan Ka Mahasangam (2025)
- Param Singh as Dr. Neelkant "Neil" Pradhan from Ghum Hai Kisikey Pyaar Mein in Manoranjan Ka Mahasangam (2025)
- Kanwar Dhillon as Sachin Deshmukh from Udne Ki Aasha in Manoranjan Ka Mahasangam (2025)
- Neha Harsora as Sailee Jadhav from Udne Ki Aasha in Manoranjan Ka Mahasangam (2025)

== Ratings ==
Jaadu Teri Nazar – Daayan Ka Mausam entered in TRP top five in opening week.
