= Gul Khan (producer) =

Indian producer, writer and director (born 1974)

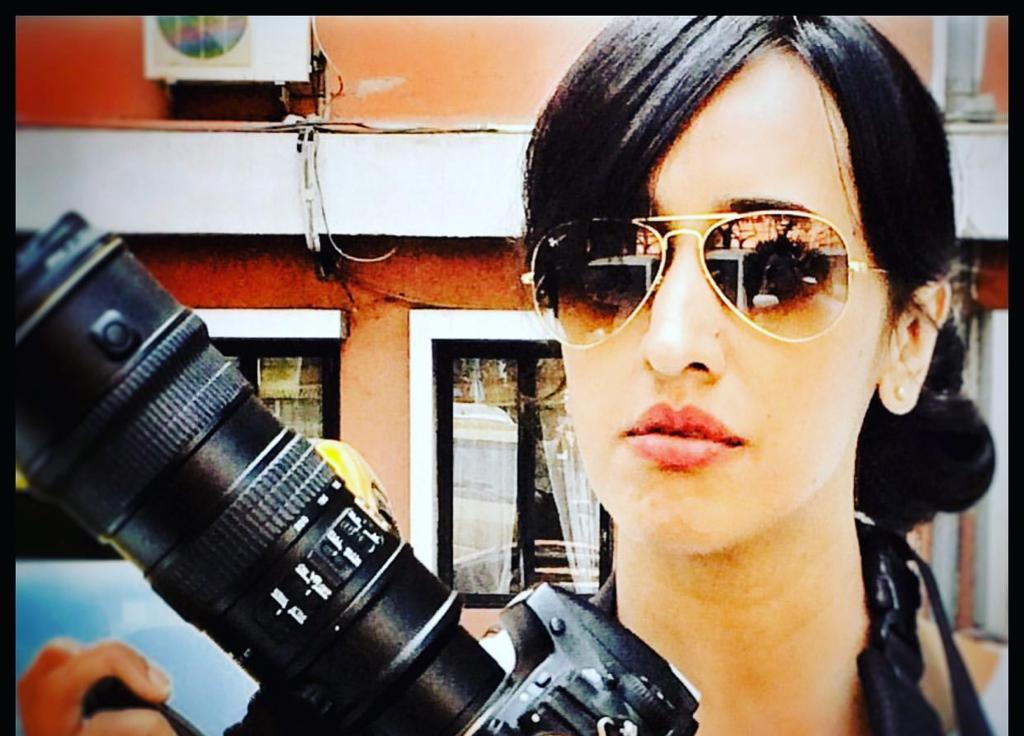
- Born: 5 March 1974 (age 52); Delhi, India
- Education: Jamia Millia Islamia
- Occupations: Producer; director; writer
- Years active: 2008–present
- Spouse: Gorky M
- Website: gulenaghmakhan.com

Gul Khan (born 5 March 1974) is an Indian producer, writer and director known for producing shows like Geet, Qubool Hai, Iss Pyaar Ko Kya Naam Doon?, Ishqbaaaz, Kullfi Kumarr Bajewala, Nazar, Yehh Jadu Hai Jinn Ka!, Imlie, Ishk Par Zor Nahi and Aashiqana. She is co-creative head and co-producer of 4 Lions Films.

== Early and personal life ==
Khan has studied in Jamia Millia Islamia, New Delhi. She is married to Gorky M.

== Filmography ==
| Year | Title | Role | Channel | Ref(s) |
|---|---|---|---|---|
| | Dan | Director | RCTI | |
| | Hidayah | Director | SCTV | |
| | Cinta Memang Gila | Director | RCTI | |
| | Dongeng | Director | SCTV | |
| | Goal(indonesian) | Director | RCTI | |
| | Mimpi Manis | Director | SCTV | |
| | Senyumku Tangisku | Director | | |
| | Cinderella | Director | RCTI | |
| | Superhit Muqabla | Writer | DD National | |
| | Panaah (TV series) | Director | DD National | |
| | Rishtey (TV series) | Director | Zee TV | |
| | Shaheen (TV series) | Director | Sony TV | |
| | Sanjivani (2002 TV series) | Director | Star Plus | |
| | Ssshhhh...Koi Hai | Director | Star Plus | |
| | Bawang Merah Bawang Putih (TV series) | Director | RCTI | |
| 2008–2009 | Chand Ke Paar Chalo | Producer | NDTV Imagine | |
| 2010–2011 | Geet | Producer | Star One | |
| 2011–2012 | Iss Pyaar Ko Kya Naam Doon? | Producer | Star Plus | |
| 2012–2014 | Arjun | Writer | Star Plus | |
| 2012–2016 | Qubool Hai | Writer; Producer; Director | Zee TV | |
| 2013–2016 | Bojhena Se Bojhena | Writer | Star Jalsha | |
| 2014–2015 | Humsafars | Producer; Director | Sony TV | |
| 2015–2016 | Adhuri Kahaani Hamari | Producer | &TV | |
| 2016 | Kahani Hamari... Dil Dosti Deewanepan Ki | Producer | &TV | |
| 2016–2019 | Ishqbaaaz | Producer | Star Plus | |
| 2017 | Tanhaiyan | Producer | Hotstar | |
| 2017 | Dil Boley Oberoi | Producer | Star Plus | |
| 2017 | Iss Pyaar Ko Kya Naam Doon 3 | Producer | Star Plus | |
| 2018–2020 | Kulfi Kumar Bajewala | Producer | Star Plus | |
| 2018–2020 | Nazar | Producer | Star Plus | |
| 2019 | Nojor | Writer | Star Jalsha | |
| 2019 | Dil Toh Happy Hai Ji | Producer, Director | Star Plus | |
| 2019–2020 | Yehh Jadu Hai Jinn Ka! | Producer | Star Plus | |
| 2020 | Nazar 2 | Producer | Star Plus | |
| 2020–2024 | Imlie | Producer | Star Plus | |
| 2020–2021 | Namak Issk Ka | Producer | Colors TV | |
| 2021 | Ishk Par Zor Nahi | Producer | Sony Entertainment Television | |
| 2021 | Ankahee Dastaan | Producer | Star Plus | |
| 2021–2022 | Chikoo Ki Mummy Durr Kei | Co-Producer with Nilanjana P. | Star Plus | |
| 2021–2023 | Sindoor Ki Keemat | Producer | Dangal TV | |
| 2022 | Fanaa Ishq Mein Marjawan | Co-Producer with Dipti Kalwani and Karishma Jain (Sunny Side Up Films Pvt Ltd) | Colors TV | |
| 2022–2023 | Aashiqana – Murder Ke Mausam Mein Pyaar (Seasons 1–4) | Director/Producer | Disney+ Hotstar | |
| 2023 | Sindoor Ki keemat 2 | Producer | Dangal TV | |
| 2024 | Shamshaan Champa | Producer | Shemaroo Umang | |
| 2024 | Badi Heroine Banti Hai (Seasons 1–2) | Producer | Amazon MX Player | |
| 2024–2025 | Prem Leela | Producer | Dangal TV | |
| 2024–2025 | Apollena – Sapno Ki Unchi Udann | Producer | Colors TV | |
| 2025 | Jaadu Teri Nazar – Daayan Ka Mausam | Producer | Star Plus | |

== See also ==
- List of accolades received by Ishqbaaaz
