= Rabb Se Hai Dua =

Indian drama television series

- Genre: Drama; Romance
- Created by: Prateek Sharma
- Written by: Sameer Siddiqui
- Directed by: Ranjeet Gupta
- Creative director: Avhiroop Mazzumdar
- Starring: Aditi Sharma; Karanvir Sharma; Richa Rathore; Dheeraj Dhoopar; Yesha Rughani; Seerat Kapoor
- Opening theme: "Rabb Se Hai Dua"
- Country of origin: India
- Original languages: Hindi; Urdu
- No. of seasons: 2
- No. of episodes: 683

Production
- Producer: Prateek Sharma
- Camera setup: Multi-camera
- Running time: 20-24 minutes
- Production company: Studio LSD Private Limited

Original release
- Network: Zee TV
- Release: 28 November 2022 – 2 December 2024

Rabb Se Hai Dua (transl. My Prayer to God) is an Indian Hindi-language drama television series that premiered on 28 November 2022 on Zee TV and is digitally available on ZEE5. Produced by Prateek Sharma under LSD Films Private Limited, it formerly starred Aditi Sharma, Karanvir Sharma and Richa Rathore. From February 2024 to December 2024, it starred Yesha Rughani, Dheeraj Dhoopar and Seerat Kapoor as the second generation leads.

== Plot ==
Haider Akhtar is a wealthy businessman who is married to Dua, a kind woman. Their lives take a turn when they meet an outspoken woman, Ghazal, who befriends Dua but is at loggerheads with Haider. Haider and Dua offer shelter to Ghazal in their own house after her house gets destroyed by an earthquake. Haider befriends Ghazal too. Ghazal falls in love with Haider but tries to forget him for Dua's sake. Haider's stepmother, Gulnaaz, instigates Ghazal and reveals to her how Haider's mother, Hina, had caused Ghazal's mother's death years ago. Before dying of cancer, Ghazal's father had proposed Haider and Ghazal's marriage but Hina had declined as Dua was already engaged to Haider at that time. Ghazal turns vengeful and pretends to have forgiven Hina but vows revenge.

When Dua discovers Ghazal's grudge against Hina, she attempts to evict her from the house. Ghazal lies to Gulnaaz's son, Ruhaan, who was in love with her, that she loves him too and Hina fixes their alliance. Gulnaaz turns against Ghazal. Ghazal creates circumstances and manipulates Ruhaan into believing that she and Haider are having an affair. Thus, Ruhaan runs away on the wedding day with Dua's help. Ghazal gets Ruhaan abducted by her cousin, Ejaz. Dua is blamed for Ruhaan's escape. Ghazal reveals to Haider that Hina was responsible for her parents' death and pretends to commit suicide if he doesn't marry her.

Feeling guilty for Hina and Ruhaan's actions, Haider ends up marrying Ghazal. Everyone in the house refuses to accept Ghazal, except Hina who turns against Dua. Dua, motivated by her mother Hamida, turns bold and rebellious, refusing to perform her duties as a daughter-in-law and a wife. Ruhaan is rescued and brought back home, but he believes Dua and Haider to be his enemies. Later, Ruhaan learns about Ghazal's schemes and reconciles with Dua. Ghazal is finally exposed but she pushes Hina off the balcony, causing her to loose her memory. Ghazal uses Haider's sperm samples and gets pregnant via IVF. Once Hina recovers her memories, the Akhtar family lodge a police complaint against Ghazal. Still on the run from the police, Ghazal goes into hiding, thus concealing her pregnancy from everyone. Dua is also revealed to be pregnant.

Six months later, Kaynaat, Haider's sister, gives birth to her son, Subhaan. Dua's baby shower ceremony is interrupted by Ghazal who reveals her pregnancy and demands her rights. Dua allows Ghazal to stay in a warehouse under surveillance, near the Akhtar mansion. Kaynaat's hatred grows against Ghazal and her unborn child as she considers it as a threat to her family. Kaynaat is ousted from the house by Dua after she abducts Ghazal. With Dua’s help, Ghazal delivers a baby girl, Ibaadat.

Shortly, thereafter Dua too delivers a baby girl, Mannat. Realizing that she won't be able to live happily with Haider ever, Ghazal jumps down from the cliff, pulling Haider along with her, resulting in both of their deaths. Kaynaat blames Dua for Haider's death as she had previously ignored her warning to oust Ghazal from the house. Soon, Kaynaat is forced to shift to London with her family after she tried to kill Ibaadat again and vowed revenge on Dua.

=== After 22 years ===
Unwitting half-sisters, Ibaadat and Mannat are now grown up and share a strong sisterly bond, believing themselves to be twins. Ibaadat values her family the most and has turned out to be simple, confident and sweet. Mannat is spoiled, self-obsessed and over-pampered by the family. Dua is indifferent towards Ibaadat, who craves for Dua’s love since childhood. The family still despises Ibaadat while the only one to support her is Hamida. Ibaadat and Mannat goes to court and fights for the right of Muslim women who are victims of marital violence and their spouses marrying more than one wife according to the laws of Islam and they are appealing to the court to correct the injustice against women. Meanwhile, Subhan under the pen name of SS(secret superstar) becomes a superstar. Kaynaat returns to India with her family. Ibaadat has been writing emails to Subhaan all these years, under the name of Mannat, so that Subhaan doesn't get upset. In the present, Subhaan confesses his love for Mannat, thinking she was the one who wrote emails to him, and proposes her.

When Ibaadat risks her life to save a drunk Mannat from getting molested by her lover Farhaan, Dua accepts Ibaadat as her daughter and apologizes to her for not giving affection to her all these years. Gulnaaz and her grandchildren instigate Mannat against Ibaadat, making her believe that Farhaan was innocent and that Ibaadat wants to separate her from Farhaan. Mannat agrees to marry Subhaan. To seek revenge, Mannat conspires and creates circumstances which make it look like Ibaadat wants to steal Subhaan from her. Thus, Ibaadat receives backlash from Hina and Kaynaat. On the wedding day, Mannat runs away with Farhaan, leaving Subhaan at the altar. Ibaadat and Subhaan get married at Dua's behest while Mannat returns after receiving mistreatment from Farhaan.

A vengeful Subhaan pretends to romance Ibaadat to make Mannat jealous. Ibaadat reveals to Subhaan that she was the one who wrote emails to but he feels betrayed because she lied to him all these years. Mannat decides to snatch Subhaan from Ibaadat, after Kaynaat reveals to her the story of Dua-Haider-Ghazal and that Ibaadat is Ghazal's daughter. Mannat and Farhaan manipulate Subhaan into believing that Ibaadat had pre-planned everything with Farhaan, thus making Ibaadat evil in Subhaan's eyes. Subhaan begins hating Ibaadat and starts an affair with Mannat. Ibaadat discovers their affair and feels betrayed. With Dua and Hamida's support, Ibaadat turns outspoken and bold and stops Mannat and Subhaan's wedding. A furious Mannat reveals to Ibaadat that her real mother is actually Ghazal, leaving Ibaadat shattered. Subhaan pretends to be remorseful for his deeds in front of Ibaadat but actually plots with Mannat to gather evidence against her to divorce her.

When Mannat defames Ibaadat's character in court, an enraged Subhaan slaps her and refuses to divorce Ibaadat. Ghazal is revealed to be alive and has returned after 22 years, to seek revenge on Dua and protect her daughter Ibaadat. Mannat tries to kill Ibaadat and Subhaan breaks up with Mannat. Subhaan and Ibaadat confess their love and reunite. Angered by Mannat's attempt to kill Ibaadat, Ghazal frames Mannat for Farhaan's murder as revenge. Ibaadat, Mannat and Subhaan make Ghazal confess to killing Farhaan and framing Mannat. Ghazal tries to shoot Dua, but Mannat takes the bullet. Ghazal is arrested by the police. Mannat recovers, turns over a new leaf and unites Subhaan and Ibaadat. Kaynaat accepts Ibaadat as her daughter-in-law. Ibaadat is revealed to be pregnant with Subhaan's child and the family rejoices. The show ends on a happy note.

== Cast ==
=== Main ===
- Aditi Sharma as Dua Siddiqui Akhtar: Hamida and Ibrahim's daughter; Haider's first wife; Mannat's mother; Ibaadat's step-mother (2022–2024)
  - Raymon Singh as old Dua (2024)
- Richa Rathore as Ghazal Rehmani Akhtar: Saqib and Mariam's daughter; Haider's second wife; Ibaadat's mother; Mannat's step-mother (2022–2024)
  - Manini De as old Ghazal (2024)
- Karanvir Sharma as Haider Akhtar: Hina and Rahat's son; Dua and Ghazal's husband; Ibaadat and Mannat's father (2022–2024) (Dead)
- Yesha Rughani as Ibaadat "Ibbu" Akhtar Siddiqui: Haider and Ghazal's daughter; Dua's step-daughter; Mannat's half-sister; Subhaan's wife (2024)
- Dheeraj Dhoopar as Subhaan "SS" Siddiqui: Hafeez and Kaynaat's elder son; Sufiyaan's brother; Mannat's ex-fiancé; Ibaadat's husband
- Seerat Kapoor as Mannat Akhtar: Haider and Dua's daughter; Ghazal's Step-daughter; Ibaadat's half-sister; Subhaan's obsessive lover turned to Well Wisher and Ex-fiancée

=== Recurring ===
- Sandeep Rajora / Mandeep Kumar Azad as Rahat Akhtar: Zeenat's son; Hina and Gulnaaz's husband; Haider, Kaynaat, Ruhaan and Noor's father (2022–2023) / (2023–2024)
- Nishigandha Wad as Hina Akhtar: Rahat's first wife; Haider and Kaynaat's mother (2022–2024)
- Melanie Nazareth as Gulnaaz Akhtar: Rahat's second wife; Ruhaan and Noor's mother (2022–2024)
- Ankit Raizada as Ruhaan Akhtar: Gulnaaz and Rahat's son; Armaan and Nigaar's father (2022–2024)
- Simran Upadhyay / Shreya Jain as Noor Akhtar: Rahat and Gulnaaz's daughter; Ruhaan's sister (2022–2023) / (2023–2024)
- Mandeep Bamra as Armaan Akhtar: Ruhaan and Zoya's son; Nigaar's brother (2024)
- Riya Verma as Nigaar Akhtar: Ruhaan and Zoya's daughter; Armaan's sister (2024)
- Alka Kaushal as Hamida Siddiqui: Ibrahim's widow; Dua and Hafeez's mother (2023–2024)
- Lokit Phulwani as Hafeez Siddiqui: Ibrahim and Hamida's son; Kaynaat's husband; Subhaan and Sufiyaan's father (2023–2024)
- Saarvie Omana as Kaynaat Akhtar Siddiqui: Hina and Rahat's daughter; Hafeez's wife; Subhaan and Sufiyaan's mother (2022–2024)
  - Amrapali Gupta as old Kaynaat (2024)
- Tanish Mahendru as Sufiyaan Siddiqui: Hafeez and Kaynaat's younger son; Subhaan's brother (2024)
- Sheela Sharma as Zeenat "Dadi Ammi" Akhtar: The Matriarch of Akhtar Family: Rahat's mother (2022–2024)
- Gultesham Khan as Ejaz Khan: Ghazal's foster brother (2023–2024)
- Manuj Nagpal as Iqbal: A goon after Ghazal (2022)
- Sachin Sharma as Ravi Sharma: Haider's manager and brother-figure (2022–2024)
- Sweetu Panjwani as Dr. Kashaf: Ghazal's accomplice and daughter-figure; Sufiyaan's ex-girlfriend (2024)
- Ray Parihar as Farhaan: Mannat's ex–boyfriend (2024) (Dead)
- Shalu Shreya as Mumtaz Sheikh: A former maid in the Akhtar household (2022–2023)
- Farhan Qureshi as Aarav Malhotra: A fashion designer (2023)
- Simmi Dixit as Inspector Manisha Jatt (2023–2024)
- Ahmad Harhash as Raj Sheikh: Mumtaz's brother (2022–2023)

== Production ==
=== Development ===
The series is produced by Prateek Sharma under the banner of LSD Films Private Limited. It is Zee TV's fourth show with an Islamic background after Qubool Hai, Ishq Subhan Allah and Qurbaan Hua.

=== Casting ===
Karanvir Sharma was cast to portray the male lead Haider, marking his return after Shaurya Aur Anokhi Ki Kahani. It was reported that Aalisha Panwar would be the lead, but Aditi Sharma was cast as the female lead Dua, marking her television comeback after Yehh Jadu Hai Jinn Ka!. News were that Aalisha Panwar or Roopal Tyagi will be play the parallel lead Ghazal, but finally Richa Rathore was cast to portray Ghazal opposite Karanvir Sharma, marking her comeback after Aapki Nazron Ne Samjha.
