= HRMS =

HRMS may refer to:

- Hans Raj Model School, New Delhi, India
- High-resolution mass spectrometry
- High Resolution Microwave Survey, a NASA project
- His/Her Dutch Majesty's Ship
- Human resource management system
