= Crashh =

- Poster
- Genre: Drama
- Written by: Nikita Dhond; Aparna Nadig
- Directed by: Kushal Zaveri
- Starring: Zain Imam; Rohan Mehra, Aditi Sharma, Anushka Sen, Kunj Anand
- Country of origin: India
- Original language: Hindi
- No. of seasons: 1
- No. of episodes: 10 (list of episodes)

Production
- Producer: Ekta Kapoor
- Editors: Vikas Sharma; Vinay Malu
- Production company: Balaji Telefilms

Original release
- Release: 14 February 2021

Crashh is an Indian Hindi-language original drama web series which is streaming on ALTBalaji and ZEE5. It stars Zain Imam, Rohan Mehra, Aditi Sharma, Kunj Anand and Anushka Sen. The web series released on 14 February 2021. It is written by Nikita Dhond, directed by Kushal Zaveri and co-directed by Preeti Gupta. Produced by Ekta Kapoor with production house as Balaji Telefilms.

== Synopsis ==
It is a story of sibling love and the pain of being separated at a young age. In the year of 2001, a happy family was torn apart by a fateful accident, the survivors were four siblings Kabir, Kajol, Jashn and Jia. The siblings were suddenly orphaned and find refuge in an orphanage. Kabir being the eldest always promised to take care of his family but soon all three siblings are adopted by their families and Kabir was left all alone in this world. He then decides to find his long lost siblings Kajol, Jia (who is renamed as Alia) and Jashn (who is named now as Rahim after adoption.) Alia is now a rich spoilt girl and her twin brother Rahim serves her as her Driver. He treats Alia as her own sister and loves her very much as a sister. Kajol lives with her adoptive mother who has an affair with a married man. Alia and kajol cross paths and things don't go right between them. Later Kabir finds out that Kajol is her sister and they unite. At the end of the last episode, he realizes that Jia is nobody else but Alia.

== Cast ==
The series features the following casts:

- Kunj Anand as Kabir
- Aditi Sharma as Kajal Sehgal
- Rohan Mehra as Jashn/Rahim Ansari (after adoption)
- Anushka Sen as Jia/Alia Mehra (after adoption)
- Zain Imam as Rishab Sachdev
- Meena Mir as Rahim's Mother
- Sonali Khare
- Aanchal Khurana as Madhurima Mehra
- Sonali Sudan as Razia
- Tuhinaa Vohra as Divya
- Syed Raza Ahmed as Puneet Kapoor
- Vihaan Choudhary as Aditya Mehra

== Releases ==
On 24 December 2020, ALTBalaji on its official Instagram profile announced that the web series will release on 14 February 2021. The web series trailer was launched on 4 February 2021.

== Episodes ==
| No. overall | No. in season | Title | Directed by | Written by | Original release date |
|---|---|---|---|---|---|
| 1 | 1 | "One Womb…Four Destinies" | Kushal Zaveri | Nikita Dhond | 14 February 2021 |
Story starts with 20 year old flashback where we see 4 siblings Kabir, Kajol, Alia and Rahim travelling in car with parents, and then accident happens. Then story switches to present where Divya (lady who adopted Kajol) is shown with cut on wrist(attempt to suicide). Inspector Kabir comes to interrogate and it is revealed that Divya is single mother and has affair with married man Gautam. On other hand, Alia (social influencer) and her friend Puneet are introduced. They are rich. In the lawn, anniversary party of Puneet's parents Gautam and Devyani is going on. These 3 know about affair. Here Gautam goes to washroom to receive call from Kajol. Devyani is traumatized and Madhurima (Alia's mother) takes her out of lawn towards her car. Here Rahim (as Alia's driver) is shown. He is portrayed as loyal driver. In the washroom, Gautam tells Kajol that he doesn't want to talk to Divya, at least today. Then Kajol and Divya have verbal fight. Kajol insists she doesn't want to study in same college as of Puneet, because fees is paid by Gautam which she doesn't like. Divya replies that Kajol is too young to understand love. In a flashback scene Divya can be seen adopting Kajol and the matron telling 4 siblings that they have been adopted by different people. In Next scenes Alia's character of being smart and having a good bonding with her mother is revealed. In the end, Kabir sits with childhood photo of siblings and pledges to find them with help of a reporter, Bidisha.
| 2 | 2 | "Swipe Right for the Drama" | Kushal Zaveri | Nikita Dhond | 14 February 2021 |
Episode starts with Kajol's first day to college (in which Puneet also studies). Puneet is very frustrated on seeing Kajol there and vents out anger on Alia saying his Dad wants to ruin his space. Alia approaches Kajol for helping but she refuses, which irritates Alia. In the evening, when Kajol goes to a bar where she is shocked when few men approach her to sleep with them. It is revealed that someone created tinder account in her name. She calls inspector Kabir, reports this matter and tells she doubts Puneet created this fake account. Inspector reaches Puneet's home where his father doesn't let them arrest Puneet stating lack of evidence. On the other hand, Divya bursts out on Kajol saying why she doubts, her love Gautam's son, Puneet. A parallel story is revolving around Rahim is also going on. It portrays his loyal nature towards Alia. Story also portrays that how he is being forced to marry a girl because he will get dowry, which can get him out of poverty. He feels helpless and goes to do robbery with his friends, even when he doesn't like doing such acts. Episode concludes showing Puneet talks to Rishabh on phone. Alia is also with Puneet and is listening to Rishabh's voice dreamily as Rishabh is her love interest.
| 3 | 3 | "Slam Bam, Thank You Ma'am" | Kushal Zaveri | Nikita Dhond | 14 February 2021 |
Episode starts with Divya crying over her messed up love life with Gautam and Kajol promises to sort it. Meanwhile Rahim and his gang have a narrow escape from Inspector and his team at robbery spot. Back at college, we see hypocrite principal, speaking about women's right on social media and then telling Kajol that they are worried about college reputation, not for Kajol. Kajol decides not to take part in slam poetry. On other hand Kabir is investigating the robbery case and he gets a call that they got a lead in fake tinder account case. At college, Rahim is using dating app while waiting for Alia in parking. He right swipes a girl, Razia. He sees the same girl walking out of college and tries to impress her. Then Kabir arrives at college, Rahim hides. Kajol tells Kabir that she doesn't want to study in this college. Then at home, Devyani tells Madhurima that some adoptions never work (hinting towards Kajol and Divya) and Divya is just using Gautam to take his money. Madhurima responds that maybe Kajol will play a role to separate them and also tells not to talk about adoption as Alia is adopted. At college a boy named Anuj confesses that he made fake account to prank Kajol. Then it is revealed that Anuj took blame on himself because Alia asked him to in return of going on a coffee date with him. Later Kajol gets to know truth that Alia created fake account. Then Kajol walks to stage and recites her slam poetry targeted towards Alia in a cryptic way, signalling that she knows the truth of Alia. Alia understands the under lying meaning, and at last both shake hands signalling that it is now cold war between them.
| 4 | 4 | "Enter at Your Own Risk" | Kushal Zaveri | Nikita Dhond | 14 February 2021 |
It is Puneet's birthday. Kajol is invited by Gautam and she joins party, unwillingly. Puneet and his mother are very sad and frustrated on seeing Kajol. Puneet asks Kajol that he wants to show him the workplace of Gautam and Divya. He takes Kajol inside a room and says "just wanted to show what your mom did here with my dad" and tightly shuts the door so only those two are present in that dark room. On the other hand, Razia right swipes (i.e. shows love interest in) Rahim and both meet outside Puneet's house.
| 5 | 5 | "The Night of Betrayal" | Kushal Zaveri | Nikita Dhond | 14 February 2021 |
Episode starts in dark room in which Puneet is trying to molest kajol. Alia opens door, kajol runs out, and Puneet tells Alia that Kajol got aggressive but Alia knew that he was lying. Kajol narrates this incident to her mother Divya but she thinks Kajol was saying this to separate her from Gautam. Then Kajol goes to police station to file complaint against Puneet, but Alia comes and says there was no physical touch when she entered room. Kajol got sad, but Inspector kabir assures that Puneet will be punished.
| 6 | 6 | "Lost and Found" | Kushal Zaveri | Nikita Dhond | 14 February 2021 |
The episode starts with Kabir in a pizza joint with a girl. The girl is a friend of Kamble's wife. Kabir being an introvert doesn't really like the unwanted date fixed by Kamble and his wife. He ends up disappointing the girl. We see Kajol at the college canteen with her laptop and music on, looking very pale and avoids Alia. Alia feels slightly affected as she knew Kajol was right about the molestation. Kajol notices a job offer of a student required for part-time work at the AMS Medical Centre. We see Aditya and Gautam with Rishabh convincing him to stay back in India and work at Aditya's hospital. Gautam really wants him to stay for Puneet. Rishabh assures him not to worry about Puneet and he will handle the matter and make Puneet understand. Gautam always wanted Puneet to be like Rishabh and Aditya wanted Alia and Rishabh to still date. Rishabh has always been very dedicated to his work and a passionate guy, he feels the rain and enjoys his loneliness as his happiness. Aditya and Gautam always praise him and wishes their kids to be like him. Kabir was in search of his family and we see him walking into a run-down kind of building. He knocks on the door and we see the matron who can get in touch with his siblings. Kabir was tired of the longing but has never given up on it. We see Kabir being frustrated and finds a car driving brashly and cuts his car. He gets very pissed and stops them. There was a bunch of boys along with Puneet sitting in the car. Puneet was high on drugs. Kabir gets too pissed and punches Puneet. We see Puneet's hallucinating vision. We see Rishabh walking in a lone telephone booth in the middle of nowhere on a street talking to someone over the telephone. Kajol was jogging on the oceanfront, listening to music and realised she had no one. She was recalling how she was molested and no one took a stand for her. We see a car parked in a quiet lane. It's raining and inside we see two people making out, its Razia and Rahim. We see Alia in College where preps were on for the Malang Fest. She notices Puneet with his friends applying ice on his bruise. Alia calls up Rishabh to talk to him about Puneet's weird behaviour but Rishabh disconnects her call with no interest. We see Rishabh and Kajol cross their paths, both strangers dealing with their own mess and enjoying loneliness. Puneet tries to convince Rishabh while working out in a private gym for Alia's interest in him, to which he refuses. Cops come in and arrest Puneet for possessing drugs. It was Kajol's first day at the job and she wanted to check all the details and files of the patients to get full knowledge about their right treatment. She figures out some files of missing samples of drugs that have been illegally supplied. We see Kajol, Rishabh, Alia and Puneet along with their parents in a police station where Kajol files a written complaint against the illegal supply of drugs in Puneet's name. This is the first time we see Kajol and Rishabh exchange their look and Rishabh tries to talk to Kajol with the confirmation of him joining Aditya's hospital for the pro bono cases. Gautam gets too pissed and ends up things with Divya as it was the third time Kajol filed a case against his son, Puneet. Kajol comes back home and understands something is wrong with Divya as her eyes are red and she bursts out to Kajol about Gautam leaving her because of her and tells her about Inspector Kabir as the Matron had called her before. We end the episode with Kabir and Kajol meeting and realizing they are siblings and both of them weeping out of happiness of getting back together.
| 7 | 7 | "Baby, Pull Me Closer" | Kushal Zaveri | Nikita Dhond | 14 February 2021 |
We start the episode with Kajol and Kabir being awkward and they don't have much to talk about. They are at Kabir's apartment. Kabir was making eggs in the kitchen and both of them were trying to start a conversation. We see the torn photograph shown in episode 1 is being joined by Kabir and Kajol. They were quietly staring at the picture and were recalling their memories. We see Alia is very tensed about Puneet, she wants to get justice for Puneet. Alia calls Rahim about sending him some links to spread with his college friends about Puneet being innocent and Kajol trying to put him in trouble. Rahim gets disappointed with Alia's reaction but follows whatever she says as he is her driver. Alia understands his hesitation. Rahim and his parents were at Aamna's place for Rahim's marriage proposal. Rahim was very shocked as he knew Aamna's name to be Razia and was the same girl he already knew. We see Kabir and Kajol cleaning dishes and Kabir asked her if she wants to shift with him but he knew about her adopted mother, Divya. Kajol hesitated to that as she made him understand that about not staying together and that she can't leave her mom. They both recall their childhood memories where Alia used to love Kulfi ice cream and were cherishing it. We see Kabir dropping Kajol at her place. Divya was waiting for Kajol, she was disappointed with the fact that Kajol will shift with her brother, Kabir. We see an intense conversation between Kajol and Divya. Kajol confirms her of not leaving her. Divya is completely shattered as Gautam left her and she shuts her bedroom door, completely shaken and shattered. We see Malang fest going on with all colourful posters and interesting events like slam poetry. Kajol is rehearsing her slam poetry lines backstage where Rishabh walks up to her and talks about Puneet and that she has an issue with him and that is why she keeps on targeting him. They have a heated conversation and Kajol walks out from there. We see Rishabh finds out 4-5 friends of Puneet are into drugs and also understands Puneet to be involved in this. We see slam poetry happening at the Malang fest where Alia and Kajol face off each other and Alia wins but Rishabh figures out that Kajol was right. We cut to the past where we see baby Kabir and Manasi in their small house concentrating on juggling, young Alia and Rahim are chuckling. The mother explains the five juggling balls to be family, love, friends and money and we juggle these every day, 2 balls are made of glass if those falls won't come back again, health and money. We see Alia juggling in present outside the college hall. We see Rishabh and Alia in Alia's bedroom where she finds out Puneet was into drugs as Rishabh shares with her. Rishabh cross-questions Alia about Kajol's molestation where she defended Puneet. He was disappointed. We see Kajol and Rishabh at the hospital where they are called for an emergency of a lady with twin delivery. Kajol and Rishabh are at the scrub room after the operation where they were talking, we see Kajol faces him and falls for him and kisses Rishabh. Suddenly taken aback, Kajol reacts to him saying he might share this incident with his friends. Rishabh looked confused and shocked by her reaction. We see Kajol storming off but Rishabh feeling something shaken by this girl and understands she has trust issues. A song plays and it fades out.
| 8 | 8 | "Make a Birthday Wish!" | Kushal Zaveri | Nikita Dhond | 14 February 2021 |
We begin with the shot of a cake being pulled out by Kajol and Kabir's parents. Babies are super excited. It was a birthday celebration, parents laughing, their loud laughter begins to fade and we poetically swipe to the present. We see Kajol is sitting near the window, she is messaging her mother Divya. Kabir and Kajol in a good conversation and Kabir pull out a cake, and we see smashing of cakes, a very sibling fight away. We see Alia and Madhurima in Alia's bedroom. They are planning Alia's birthday and Madhurima gets a call from the Matron and her expression changes. She manages to not let Alia know about the call. Sakeena feels irritated about Rahim just being jobless and careless. Rahim gave it back to her saying he doesn't want to get married but wants to follow his dreams. We see Alia goes to meet Puneet at the police station. Kabir is sitting at a chai tapri chatting with one of the constables. We see Aamna steps out from an auto-rickshaw and walks towards a car that is parked in a dark bylane near the college. Rahim gets out of the car and is pissed with Aamna as she lied about her original name. Aamna quickly whispers to him and ask him not to create a scene out of this. We cut to they are seated inside the car and the heated conversation was on and Aamna just grabs him by the hair and kisses him. They start to make out when a torch flashlight falls on their face. It was Kamble, the constable. We see Kabir and Kamble, where Kabir warns Rahim about telling his truth of stealing car parts to Aamna. We see Alia's birthday party happening. It's a young party where we see her friends partying. We see Devyani comes to meet Madhurima. She is very pissed. Madhurima and Aditya didn't want her to be there. A very heated conversation between Madhurima, Aditya and Devyani as Devyani was really irritated and pissed about Alia having her birthday party and being his best friend she didn't even bother to invite Puneet. Devyani irritatedly says Madhurima that Alia is not even their blood and without their knowledge, Alia hears their conversation and doesn't react to it. We show Alia trying to have fun with friends. When Alia comes to Aditya with a piece of cake, she softly, with moist eyes reveals that she knows that she is adopted and heard their conversation. We cut to Rahim who is outside writing a note in broken English. His phone rings, Sakeena irritated shouts at him over the phone for money, Rahim loses it and gives it back by saying he is trying to get money and hung up the call. Alia came out of the party area as she is too shattered and broken and notices Rahim. He shares that it was also his birthday. He requests her for 5lakhs as a loan for his family. Alia's phone rings, she finalises a deal of 5 lakhs to post for the adoption of stray dogs. She confirms to post it and assures Rahim about the money. We cut to a resto-bar, Rishabh drinking alone. Kajol entered the same bar and ordered two bottles of whiskey. Rishabh tries to start a conversation with her but she doesn't bother much and leaves the bar with the bottles. We see Kajol came to Kabir's place with the bottles. She wanted to celebrate their siblings birthday. We see them enjoying their drinks. Rahim was celebrating with his friends at a small Muslim kebab-joint. We see Alia being shattered, excuses herself from her birthday crowd.
| 9 | 9 | "Dial D for Drama" | Kushal Zaveri | Nikita Dhond | 14 February 2021 |
We start the episode with Alia seated on a couch, a hall filled with bouquets. Aditya and Madhurima trying to break the ice by talking to her. She understands and asks for the Matron's number. Madhurima gives her a card saying this can help her find her family. Alia is all broken and shattered. We see tense Matron seated opposite Kajol and Kabir who are in search of the other two siblings. Kajol gets irritated and pissed with the Matron. We see Divya seated in front of a dressing table, applying lipstick, all dressed up, a look of anticipation on her face. We cut to Divya driving rashly in excitement. She meets Gautam, where we see Gautam giving a deal to Divya about convincing Kajol to shut the case on Puneet or he would leave her, to which she agrees as she is madly in love with him. We see Rahim and Alia in the car. Alia is drunk and looks lost and disturbed. We cut to Kabir where he is smoking near a tapri and gets a call from the Matron who confirms him about his sister coming down to meet her. Kabir excitedly runs through busy roads and street, getting pushed, pushing people to run back to the Matron's building. As he enters the Matron's house, the matron says that she called and said she is coming in a black Mercedes but didn't come. He rushes to the balcony and notices a black Mercedes, since it is from a distance the car number is not clear to him, he sees a sticker behind the car and it leaves. He is completely broken and shattered and asks for the number to which she disagrees as its illegal. We see Alia all disturbed and lost in a gaming arcade kind of place, beer in hand and bowling. Rishabh calls Alia to know where was she. Alia went to the hospital to meet Rishabh, she is all drunk and going swirling on the moving chair, lost and broken. Rishabh tries to console her and make her understand. We see Divya and Kajol at the hospital cafeteria; Divya came to convince Kajol about the shutting of Puneet's case. She cautiously makes Kajol feel guilty about what she did to her and why that she is the reason for Gautamji to leave her. Kajol gets up and disagrees with what Divya requests. Divya plays with the coffee -stirrer and she just slightly rubs it against her wrist to show that she has a devious plan in her mind. Rishabh is putting Alia on salt saline in a darkish room. Alia is completely unmanageable for Rishabh as she is too drunk. Kajol walks in. Kajol does the work with Rishabh, she puts the saline for Alia. They are working together. Kajol is about to leave when Alia holds her hand and says that she is smart and asks if she gets a missing piece of a big jigsaw puzzle and yet the puzzle looks incomplete, what would she do, remove all pieces or just search for that one piece. Kajol got a little frozen by her question. Kajol manages to ignore and asks Rishabh if there's anything else that she can help with and is about to leave. We see Kajol walking outside, collecting some blood samples, Rahim stops her and says if she can pass Alia's phone to her as her parents are worried and have been calling for a long time. Kajol says yes to that and goes to hand over the phone to Alia. Kajol enters the room and sees Alia kissing Rishabh, he trying to pull back, Alia is aggressive and emotional. Kajol notices and turns to quietly leave the room and hears Rishabh stopping Alia and by mistake says Kajol, please. Alia is too high to register this but Kajol heard it. We see Kajol hurriedly rushes to the lift where Rishabh was already there. Divya is in the ward, cut her wrist. Kajol explains everything to the doctor in a very robotic way as she is very used to this. We see Gautam and Devyani sharing drinks and Gautam assuring Devyani about Puneet to be alright soon. Rahim walking to Alia to the car to get her back home. We see Kajol enter her house and opens her WhatsApp chat with Kabir, crashes on the bed remembering the accident of her parents, of her mother, last word in her head, Rishabh talking her name while he was with Alia and the screen goes black. Kajol's eyes open as she gasps for air, she remembers the matron saying "your parents are dead".
| 10 | 10 | "Bonded by Blood" | Kushal Zaveri | Nikita Dhond | 14 February 2021 |
Episode starts with visuals of Kajol putting Divya in the hospital, leaving, texting Kabir, crashed on the bed. Kajol's eyes fly open, she is sweating, gasping for air and she reaches for water. Kabir's voice kicks in with urgency. Kajol jolts and sees Kabir in front of her. She was startled. We see Kabir panicking. Kabir hurriedly packs her bag. Kajol all confused and worried for her mom as she was in the hospital. Kabir asks her where she was in the last 24 hours. Kajol doesn't remember anything and says she was at home and went off to sleep and her mother was admitted and wants to go and check on her. We see a body in the hospital; someone making a report examining the body, the body was sealed. The doctor declared the injury was too much and they couldn't save him. It was Gautam. Rishabh goes out to handle Devyani who was almost shrieking, shivering, he holds her. Puneet's eyes are filled with vengeance, he grits his teeth and says that he wants to kill Kajol as he thinks she is the reason for Gautam's death. We see Rahim with a few of his friends watching a video on his phone while Rahim is baffled and nervous. One of his friends tells him to blackmail and make money using this video. We see Kabir extremely panicking and packing Kajol's bag while they hear Divya entering the house. Kabir panics more. Kajol all confused doesn't understand what is going on. Kabir flashes the phone on her face and shows her the date. It was a day back when she admitted Divya to the hospital and doesn't remember anything after she went to sleep that day. Divya was all broken to know about Gautam's death. Kabir and Kajol run on the dark roads. Kabir informs Kajol that Gautam was found injured in an alley a day back. She was shocked. Kabir calls Kamble and asks to do a blood test and to keep it confidential. Kajol and Kabir share a look, both are slightly tensed and puzzled. We see Aditya, Puneet are at the hospital talking to a cop, intense conversation between them. Rishabh is in front of his computer system and types Kajol's name. He finds out that she did not punch her card to the hospital the day Gautam was found injured. There was no trace of her. We see Kabir, Kamble, Kajol and the diagnostic man taking Kajol's blood samples for drug-blood test. Kajol was too confused. She had no idea about the last 24hours. She couldn't remember a bit of it. We see Madhurima, Devyani, and Alia in a mid-conversation. Devyani is too shattered. Madhurima gets pissed with the way she talks about DNA logic to which Alia gets a bit off. Madhurima and Alia emotionally talk about how Alia used to be when she was a kid. Alia understands the emotional state of Madhurima and hugs her to comfort her. We see Kabir entered the hospital and sees that the hospital is swarmed with cops. Kabir scans the hospital footage and opposite him we see Rishabh. He informs Kabir that Kajol didn't turn up after her mother's discharge from the hospital. Kabir gets pissed and asks him how did he figure out that Kajol is the suspect. Kabir's phone rings, it Bidisha. He answers it. She informs him about the other guy from the other car from his parents' accident, he is a doctor and tells his name. We see Kajol is seated in a room alone. Her eyes shut tightly and trying to recall the last 24 hours. She reluctantly takes her phone, switches it on and dials Rishabh's number. We see the cops in the police control room traces Kajol's phone. Kamble hands over a pen drive to Kabir saying that the driver has given it and Kabir quickly plays the pen drive and watches it. We see it in a dark alley, Gautam and Kajol are amidst a heated argument. Kajol is shouting. Kajol very irritated pushes Gautam in disgust. The scene plays on a computer screen. Kabir looks horrified, he opens a note that he got with the pen drive which says " I know she is your sister, what is the price for her safety. We see tension all over Kabir's face. Kabir is shocked since Rahim has blackmailed him. Just then we see the cops got Kajol with them. Kabir looks at Kajol with moist eyes and we see all our four characters present in the same spot and how four siblings together for one murder.

== Reception ==
=== Critical reception ===
Ronak Kotecha from The Times of India review team has given this web series as 2.5/5 stars stating that it is an overtly emotional sibling drama. Overall writing and execution of the series failed to capitalize the strength. What more needed was to land safely heart tugging moments and real characters.
