= Ashita Dhawan =

Indian television actress (born 1982)

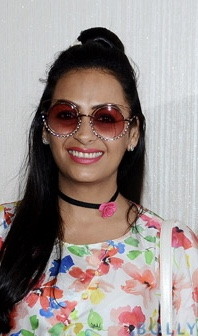
- Ashita Dhawan in 2017
- Born: 23 May 1980 (age 46)
- Occupation: Actress
- Years active: 2004–present
- Television: Sapna Babul Ka...Bidaai; Ladies Special; Nazar
- Height: 157 cm (5 ft 2 in)
- Spouse: Shailesh Gulabani (m. 2010)

Ashita Dhawan is an Indian television actress, known for her roles in Sapna Babul Ka...Bidaai, Ladies Special and Nazar.

== Career ==
Ashita made her television debut in 2005 with Kesar that aired on StarPlus. She shot to fame with her performances in shows that include Nazar and Yehh Jaadu Hai Jinn Ka, Sindoor Ki Keemat, Imlie, Dharam Patnii, and Yeh Rishta Kya Kehlata Hai.

She is currently playing the role of Yashoda Awasthi in Dangal TV's show Sindoor Ki Keemat.

In November 2022 she was cast for a role in the Balaji Telefilms’ new show Dharam Patnii.

== Television ==
Year	Show	Role	Notes
2005	Kesar	Neha	Debut
2007–10	Sapna Babul Ka... Bidaai	Malti	
2008	Zara Nachke Dikha	Contestant	
2009	Ladies Special	Bubbly	
2010–11	Baba Aiso Varr Dhoondo	Gaushla Laal	
2012	Adaalat	Manjula	Episodic
2012	Nach Baliye 5	Contestant	With Gulabani
2014	Aur Pyaar Ho Gaya	Savri	
2014–15	Box Cricket League 1	Contestant	Player in Rowdy Bangalore
2016	Box Cricket League 2	Contestant	Player in Rowdy Bangalore
2016–17	Kaala Teeka	Chulbuli	
2016–17	Yeh Vaada Raha	Kamini	
2018	Khichdi	Komal	
2018–20	Nazar	Chaitali	
2020	Yehh Jadu Hai Jinn Ka!	Nasreen	
2021	Yeh Rishta Kya Kehlata Hai	Sheela	
2021	Imlie		
2021	Sindoor Ki Keemat	Yashoda Awasthi	
2022–2023	Pyar Ke Saat Vachan Dharampatnii	Dolly Vikrant Randhawa	
2023	Naagin 6	Ashita Patel	
2024	Krishna Mohini	Srijila Thakkar	
2024	Mera Balam Thanedaar	Sampoorna	Cameo
2024–2025	Prem Leela	Uttara	
2026–present	Mannat – Har Khushi Paane Ki	Meena Oberoi	

=== Web series ===
Year	Name	Role	Notes
2024	Raisinghani vs Raisinghani	Dolly Raisinghani	

== Personal life ==
Dhawan is married to Shailesh Gulabani since 20 January 2010. They have 2 kids together, twins Arhmaan and Amaira.
