= Aditi Sharma (actress, born 1996) =

Indian television actress (born 1996)

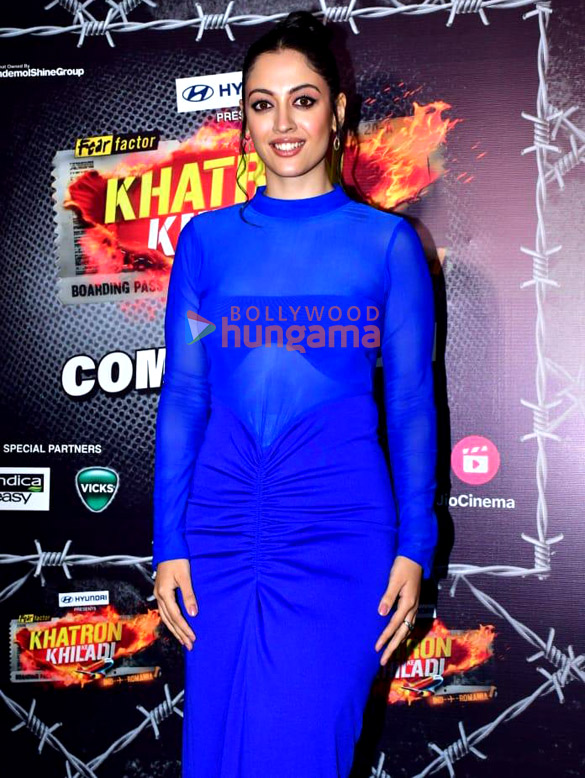
- Aditi Sharma in 2024
- Born: 4 September 1996 (age 29); New Delhi, India
- Occupations: Actress; model
- Years active: 2017–present
- Known for: Kaleerein; Yehh Jadu Hai Jinn Ka!; Rabb Se Hai Dua

Aditi Sharma (born 4 September 1996) is an Indian actress and model who mainly works in Hindi television. She made her acting debut in 2018 and is best known for her portrayal of Meera Dhingra Kapoor in Kaleerein, Roshni Choudhary Khan in Yehh Jadu Hai Jinn Ka!, Dua Siddiqui Akhtar in Rabb Se Hai Dua and Apollena in Apollena - Sapno Ki Unchi Udann. In 2024, she participated in the reality show Fear Factor: Khatron Ke Khiladi 14.

== Early life ==
Aditi Sharma was born on 4 September 1996 in New Delhi, India. She completed her secondary education from Hansraj Model School, Punjabi Bagh, Delhi.

She started her career as a model, having walked for Amazon Fashion Week India. Later she appeared in number of TV commercials for various brands like Titan Raga, White Ponds Beauty BB+, Amazon, etc.

== Career ==
Aditi Sharma made her acting debut in a music video named Taare starring alongside Guru Randhawa in 2017. Later she appeared in two another Punjabi music videos Naan and Bekadra and a Haryanvi music video named Tu Raja ki Raj Dulari. In February 2018, she made her television debut as Meera Dhingra Kapoor with Zee TV's Kaleerein opposite Arjit Taneja. The show ended on 16 November 2018.

In 2019, as a cameo appearance, she played Shivli Singh in Colors TV's Naagin 3. In October 2019, she starred opposite Vikram Singh Chauhan in Star Plus's fantasy romantic drama show Yehh Jadu Hai Jinn Ka! as Roshni Choudhary Khan. The show ended after a year-long run in November 2020. In 2021, she made her digital debut in Alt Balaji's Crashh which also starred Anushka Sen, Zain Imam and Rohan Mehra. Later she did two more music videos, Playboy alongside R Nait and Aadat Ve opposite Ninja. From November 2022 to February 2024, she played the lead role of Dua Siddiqui Akhtar in Zee TV's Rabb Se Hai Dua. Sharma revealed that initially she was offered the dual roles of her character Dua and her daughter owing to generation leap however she decided to opt out due to hectic schedules and her character got replaced by Raymon Singh as its older version in February 2024.

In July 2024, she participated in Khatron Ke Khiladi 14 and finished at 11th position on 18 August 2024. From December 2024 to March 2025, she playing Apollena Sukhla in Colors TV's Apollena – Sapno Ki Unchi Udann, an aspiring Astronaut. From May 2025 to June 2025, she portrayed Kesar in StarPlus's Jaadu Teri Nazar – Daayan Ka Mausam.

== Personal life ==
Sharma married Abhineet Vidyanand Kaushik on November 12, 2024, after a relationship that began in 2021. On July 31, 2025, Sharma filed a First Information Report (FIR) at Mumbai's Goregaon police station against her husband, mother-in-law, and sister-in-law. The complaint alleges domestic violence, physical and mental harassment, assault, and the misuse of her stridhan (bridal jewellery). The police subsequently initiated an investigation into the allegations.

== Filmography ==
=== Television ===
Year	Serial	Role	Notes	Ref.
2018	Kaleerein	Meera Dhingra Kapoor		
2019–2020	Yehh Jadu Hai Jinn Ka!	Roshni Choudhary Khan		
2019	Naagin 3	Shivli	Cameo	
2022–2024	Rabb Se Hai Dua	Dua Akhtar		
2024	Fear Factor: Khatron Ke Khiladi 14	Contestant	11th position	
2024–2025	Apollena – Sapno Ki Unchi Udann	Apollena Shukla		
2025	Jaadu Teri Nazar – Daayan Ka Mausam	Kesar	Cameo	

=== Web series ===
Year	Title	Role	Ref.
2021	Crashh	Kajal Sehgal	

== See also ==
- List of Hindi television actresses
- List of Indian television actresses
