= Apollena – Sapno Ki Unchi Udann =

Indian science drama television series

- Genre: Family Drama; Social issue
- Created by: Gul Khan
- Starring: Aditi Sharma; Sandeep Baswana; Samarthya Gupta
- Opening theme: Apollena by Shaan
- Country of origin: India
- Original language: Hindi
- No. of seasons: 1
- No. of episodes: 104

Production
- Producer: Gul Khan
- Camera setup: Multi-camera
- Running time: 20 minutes
- Production company: 4 Lions Films

Original release
- Network: Colors TV
- Release: 3 December 2024 – 16 March 2025

Apollena – Sapno Ki Unchi Udann is an Indian Hindi-language television science drama series that premiered on Colors TV on 3 December 2024 to 16 March 2025 and streams digitally on JioHotstar. Produced by Gul Khan under 4 Lions Films, it starred Aditi Sharma, Sandeep Baswana and Samarthya Gupta in lead roles.

== Plot ==
Set in 2005 in Delhi, an Independence Day celebration is underway. Giridhar Shukla's family, including his wife Madhu and their son Neil, attend the flag hoisting ceremony. Amidst the crowd, a stranger accidentally pushes Madhu, who is pregnant. Giridhar prevents her from falling. Later, Giridhar expresses his disappointment to Madhu, noting that Neil doesn't share an interest in aircraft like other children. She tells him that he is interested in music. Giridhar reflects on his dreams for Neil and his hopes to see them fulfilled. Pallavi Sachdeva, a senior Scientist and Giridhar's boss gets an official letter.

Girdhar tells his wife that Pallavi was an air force coordinator earlier. Now, she is a senior Scientist in his team. He wishes to introduce her to Pallavi. Pallavi informs Girdhar that about a research project, to develop the India's first astronaut training facility has got an fund. India's most prestigious space research organisation, SRI is funding it. Pallavi says to him if they become successful they will be able to send our astronauts in the space.

Madhu gets labour pains. Pallavi informs them that a VIP arrived causing the road to be blocked. She takes them to the lab and delivers the baby there. Madhu gives a birth to a baby girl in the lab.

Girdhar takes his family to his native Chitrakoot, Uttar Pradesh. His mom complaints that she got an chance to meet her granddaughter after three months as they are always staying in Delhi. A naming ceremony function is arranged for the baby. Madhu asks Renu to choose a name for her daughter. She suggests few names but Girdhar didn't liked it. He named Apollena to his daughter.

Giridhar's mom creates a scene seeing the ticket to Delhi. He informs her that it's important to go back to Delhi. She argues with him. Giridhar notices that Neil is not interested in studies as he doesn't even know 9 plantes names. Apollena answers to it. He feels proud of her. He decided to fulfill his dream through his daughter which he dreamt for Neil. Giridhar and his family leaves for Delhi.

Later, Giridhar brings his family to the lab, where Pallavi notices Apollena's love for space and advises Giridhar to train Apollena to send to the space.

On her 6th birthday Apollena wears astronaut's custom and Giridhar encourages her. Pallavi and Giridhar are arrested by some CBI officers under the charge of treason against the country. Apollena runs behind the police jeep but falls down. Giridhar is blacklisted by common people. Young Apollena vows to prove her father's innocence. Giridhar then trains Apollena in order to become an astronaut.

Apollena is now grown up living in Chitrakut with her family members. Apollena got admission in a boys college at her village. Sanjay creates a fake MMS video in order to insult Apollena but fails. A mail comes to Apollena, who thinks that the mail came from IASA. A honouring ceremony was organised for Apollena. The mail later turns out to be fake. Soon, Shlok Pandey enters. Shlok and Apollena has a cute conversation. Some circumstances forces Apollena and Shlok to marry much to Giridhar's anger.

== Cast ==
=== Main ===
- Aditi Sharma as Apollena Shukla aka Appu (2024–2025)
  - Ira Rai as Child Apollena Shukla aka Appu (2024)
- Samarthya Gupta as Shlok Pandey (2025)

=== Recurring ===
- Sandeep Baswana as Giridhar Shukla (2024–2025)
- Eva Ahuja as Madhu Shukla (2024–2025)
- Hritik Yadav as Neil Shukla (2024–2025)
  - Hardik Mehta as Child Neil Shukla (2024)
- Surabhi Tiwari as Renu Shukla Pathak (2024–2025)
- Sameer Vijayan as Ramakant Pathak (2024–2025)
- Garima Kaushal as Sangeeta Pathak (2024–2025)
  - Kayra Mulani as Child Sangeeta Pathak (2024)
- Kiran Bhargava as Damayanti (2024–2025)
- Het Makwana as Bittu (2024)
- Surbhi Chandna as Pallavi Sachdeva: A senior scientist (2024; 2025)
- Aaradhya Tiwari as Sarangi (2025)
- Sanket Choukse as Ved Pandey (2025)
- Geeta Tyagi as Saraswati Pandey (2025)
- Shahbaz Khan as Mahadev Pandey (2025)
- Anjita Poonia as Soumya Pandey (2025)
- Simran Rawal as Ira (2025)
- Karan Khandelwal as Sanjay Singh (2024)
- Atul Bharadwaj as Mohit (2024)
- Akash Kapoor as Abhay (2024)
- Bhavya Shinde as Professor Vijayan (2024)
- Vibhanshu Dixit as Akshay (2024–2025)
- Irina Rudakova as Anna (2025)
- Aaradhya tiwari as Sarangi (2024-2025)

== Production ==
=== Casting ===
Shivangi Joshi, Niharika Chouksey and Adhik Mehta were approached for the lead role, but Aditi Sharma was finalized for the role. Sandeep Baswana was cast as Giridhar Shukla, Apollena's father.
