= Humsafars =

Indian television series

- Genre: Drama; Thriller; Romance; Muslim world
- Created by: Gorky Max
- Written by: Harneet Singh
- Directed by: Gul Khan
- Creative director: Nimisha Pandey
- Starring: See below
- Composer: Raju Singh
- Country of origin: India
- Original languages: Hindi, Urdu
- No. of seasons: 1
- No. of episodes: 106

Production
- Producer: Gul Khan
- Production locations: Agra; Lucknow; Mumbai
- Cinematography: Deepak Pandey
- Running time: 20 minutes
- Production company: 4 Lions Films

Original release
- Network: Sony TV
- Release: 22 September 2014 – 27 February 2015

Humsafars (transl. Life Partners) is an Indian television drama show which aired from 22 September 2014 to 27 February 2015. Produced by Gul Khan under 4 Lions Films, it starred Harshad Chopda and Shivya Pathania.

The show chronicles the love story of Arzoo, who values truthful relationships, and Sahir, who is caught between his affection for Arzoo and nostalgia for his comatose wife.

== Plot ==
Arzoo, a hardworking aspiring fashion designer lives in Lucknow. When the Sheikhs factory burns down, she moves to Mumbai and there finds work at prestigious fashion house Saiyaara where her boss Sahir confronts her. Arzoo heads into his house, staying with them. Sahir gradually falls for her. His wife Zeenat is in coma since 7 years after facing an accident. Sahir is determined to fulfill his promise to her of becoming a happy businessman. Arzoo falls in love with him, but his brother Zaki falls for her. Sahir romances Arzoo, who confesses her feelings too.

But then Sahir breaks her heart by admitting that he was playing her, though he later realises he really loves her. Zaki proposes Arzoo. She accepts to defy Sahir, who blackmails her into marrying him. Zeenat shows signs of recovering from coma. Arzoo suspects her to be out of coma. Inspector Vikram enters to protect the family. It is later revealed Sahir's mother Alvira is in real Zeenat's mother and he is her son-in-law. Someone tries to drown Zeenat; Arzoo is blamed. Sahir rescues her. It turns out that Zeenat is posing to be in coma and working with Vikram who loves her.

Arzoo is kidnapped. Anam blackmails Alvira saying that she has a video showing Alvira was behind Zeenat's accident.

Arzoo confronts Zeenat who knows that her fake coma won't last long. Before Arzoo can tell Sahir, she pretends to come out of the coma and ask Sahir for forgiveness.

Anam tells Arzoo the truth about Zeenat and Vikram but withholds Alvira's secret. Arzoo shares everything with Sahir. Anam goes missing.

But she leaves a file behind which reveals that Alvira is Zeenat's stepmother and she instigated her father against Alvira prompting him to leave all his wealth to Zeenat.

To get a fair share for her own children, Alvira arranges Zeenat's accident and tries to have her killed but fails. She admits she used Sahir so he would get Zeenat's wealth on her death.

Anam escapes. Vikram follows her to the House and asks Zeenat to leave with him. He reveals all the misdeeds for her. They are arrested. Sahir and Arzoo promise they will always love each other.

Sahir signs over Saiyaara to Zaki and makes Anam the VP. Sahir and Arzoo look back at them for the last time and bid them goodbye. The story ends with their happy union.

== Cast ==
=== Main ===
- Harshad Chopda as Sahir Azeem Chaudhary
- Shivya Pathania as Arzoo Sheikh: Nausheen and Sarfaraz's daughter, Myra and Zara's older sister, Sahir's second wife, Farah’s stepdaughter

=== Recurring ===
- Vibha Chibber as Alvira Chaudhary– Azeem's widow, Siraj, Zaki and Zeenat's mother
- Jenice Sobti / Neha Janpandit as Zeenat Mahajan (previously Zeenat Chaudhary)– Alvira and Azeem's daughter, Sahir's first wife, Zaki and Siraj's sister
- Sehban Azim as Zaki Chaudhary– Alvira and Azeem's son, Zeenat and Siraj's brother, Arzoo's obsessive lover
- Vishal Nayak as Siraj Chaudhary– Alvira and Azeem's son, Zeenat and Zaki's brother
- Payal Rohatgi as Anam Chaudhary– Siraj's wife, Zeenat's college friend
- Bharat Chawda as ACP Vikram Singh Rathore– Zeenat's lover
- Zeena Bhatia as Kurti Aapa– a close relative of Zeenat's family
- Purva Parag as Nausheen Sheikh (previously Nausheen Khan)– Arzoo, Myra and Zara's mother, Sarfaraz's wife
- Darpan Shrivastava as Sarfaraz Sheikh– Arzoo, Myra and Zara's father, Nausheen's husband
- Madhumalti Kapoor as Alaira Sheikh– Arzoo, Myra and Zara's paternal grandmother, Sarfaraz's mother
- Diana Khan as Myra Sheikh– Nausheen and Sarfaraz's daughter, Arzoo and Zara's sister
- Ruby Dahiya as Zara Sheikh– Nausheen and Sarfaraz's daughter, Arzoo and Myra's sister
- Seema Bora as Farah Sheikh- Sarfaraz’s Second Wife, Arzoo, Myra and Zara’s stepmother

=== Guests ===
- Krystle D'Souza
- Anju Jadhav
