= Sindoor Ki Keemat =

Indian drama television series

- Genre: Drama; Romantic
- Created by: Gul Khan
- Screenplay by: S. Sekkizhar; V. Padmavathy; Guru Sampath Kumar
- Story by: Ved Raj; Aakriti Athreja; Vishwa Sharma; Aparijita Sharma (dialogue)
- Directed by: Lalit Mohan; Rahul Kumar Tiwari
- Creative director: Muskaan Bajaj
- Starring: Vaibhavi Hankare (season 1); Shehzad Sheikh (season 1); Vaibhavi Hankare (season 2); Mohit Hiranandani (season 2)
- Theme music composer: Nishant – Raj
- Opening theme: "Sindoor Ki Keemat"
- Composer: Nishant - Raj
- Country of origin: India
- Original language: Hindi
- No. of seasons: 2
- No. of episodes: 651

Production
- Executive producer: Gorky M
- Producers: Gul Khan; Karishma Bhutoria
- Cinematography: Rajan Singh
- Editors: Shashank Singh; Rakesh Das
- Camera setup: Multi-camera
- Running time: 22 minutes approx
- Production company: 4 Lions Films

Original release
- Network: Dangal
- Release: 18 October 2021 – 21 October 2023

Sindoor Ki Keemat (transl. The Cost of Vermilion) is an Indian Hindi drama romantic television series produced by 4 Lions Films, starring Vaibhavi Hankare and Shehzad Sheikh. The show premiered on 14 October 2021, and it aired on Dangal. It is the remake of the Sun TV's Tamil TV series Roja. The second season, Sindoor Ki Keemat 2, was first broadcast on 1 May 2023, and it stars Vaibhavi Hankare and Mohit Hiranandani. The storyline of the show is loosely based on the Tamil TV series Kannedhirey Thondrinal.

== Series overview ==
Season	Title	No. of episodes	Originally broadcast	
Season	Title	No. of episodes	First aired	Last aired
1	Sindoor Ki Keemat	481	18 October 2021	29 April 2023
2	Sindoor Ki Keemat 2	170	1 May 2023	21 October 2023

== Plot ==
=== Season 1 ===
Mishri is an orphaned woman who lives with her foster father Swamiji. Arjun Awasthi, the son of Prathap Awasthi, is a criminal lawyer who lives with his own family. Mishri and Arjun meet each other, later developing a rivalry. Mishri meets a man named Brij Awasthi, who is willing to find their daughter Anu after she died in a car accident.

Mishri meets Arjun to bail Swamiji. Arjun agrees, and he makes a one-year contract with her to marry him. While the entire family is surprised to see Arjun and Mishri's marriage, as Annapoorna, Arjun's grandmother, starts to blame her for ruining Priya's life.

Priya, Yashoda, and Ballu decide to separate the married couple, but they fail on every attempt. Meanwhile, Arjun and Mishri fall in love with each other, but their one-year contract is terminated. Arjun and Mishri learn about Priya and her friends' plans, exposing them to the family.

Kamini, who is Arjun's childhood obsessive lover, returns by bringing a boy named Ghanti, who claims to be his child. Mishri learns more about Kamini, knowing that Ghanti is not his child and exposes him in front of the family.

Priya kidnaps Mishri's family on the day of Dussehra festival and tries to kill them. After going through a thorough plastic surgery, Priya marries Arjun's brother, Ashwin. Mishri finds out she is pregnant with Arjun's child, while Anamika decides to kill her child. Mishri tells everyone in front of the family that Anamika is Priya. Anamika escapes and kidnaps Mishri's child, later meeting a man named Dr. Abhimanyu, who helps to get Anamika's child back.

Anamika and Abhimanyu kidnap Mishri's family, and he forces Mishri to marry him. However, Anamika is shot by a policeman when she comes to kill her and her son. Season one concludes when Mishri and Arjun raise their child and with her family.

=== Season 2 ===
Rakesh, an impoverished man, callously swaps two babies at birth for his son (Rana) to live amongst the Tripathis, the wealthiest family, while he takes the true heir of the Tripathi family—a female who he fosters (Meethi).

Rana is a male chauvinist who believes every woman should belong in the kitchen. However, he is later disproven when he meets Meethi, who is working conscientiously in her academic studies to fulfill her dreams of becoming a barrister.

== Cast ==
=== Season 1 ===
Main

- Vaibhavi Hankare as Anu "Mishri" Arjun Awasthi – Brij and Vidya's long-lost daughter; Swami's foster daughter; Arjun's wife (2021– 2023)
- Shehzad Sheikh as Advocate Arjun Awasthi – A criminal lawyer; Pratap and Kalpana's elder son; Ashwin's brother; Mishti's husband (2021–2023)

Recurring

- Meena Nathani as Bhagwati – Annapurna's sister; Vidya, Yashoda and Pratap's aunt (2021– 2023)
- Madhavi Gogate as Annapurna Awasthi – Matriarch of Awasthis'; Bhagwati's sister; Vidya, Pratap and Yashoda's mother; (2021)
  - Kiran Bhargava replaced Madhavi Gogate as Annapurna Awasthi (2021– 2023)
    - Madhuri Sanjeev replaced Kiran Bhargava as Annapurna Awasthi (2023)
- Amit Kaushik as Pratap Awasthi – Annapurna's son; Kalpana's husband; Arjun's and Ashwin's father (2021–2022)
- Jaswinder Gardner as Kalpana Awasthi – Pratap's wife; Arjun and Ashwin's mother (2021– 2023)
- Prateik Chaudhary as Ashwin Awasthi – Pratap and Kalpana's younger son; Arjun's brother; Anamika's husband (2021– 2023)
- Jyotsna Chandola as Priya / Fake "Anu" / Anamika Awasthi (After Plastic Surgery) – Ashwin's wife (2022–2023)
  - Prerna Sharma as Priya (2021–2022)
- Siraj Mustafa Khan as Brij Awasthi – A lawyer and businessman; Vidya's husband; Anu's father (2021–2022)
- Rajshri Rani / Dolly Sohi as Vidya Awasthi – Annapurna's elder daughter; Brij's wife; Anu's mother (2021) / (2022) (presumed dead)
- Vijay Singh Parmar as Ballu Awasthi – Yashoda's husband (2021– 2023)
- Ashita Dhawan as Yashoda Awasthi – Annapurna's younger daughter; Arjun, Ashwin and Anu's aunt; Ballu 's wife (2021– 2023)
- Shahab Khan as Swami – Anu's foster father; founder of the orphanage (2021)
- Nisha Nagpal as Sakshi – Priya's ally (2021)
- Krishnakant Singh Bundela as Panditji (2021)
- Chandni Bhagwanani as Kamini – Arjun's one-sided obsessive lover (2022)
- Raj Logani as Dr. Abhimanyu (2023)

Special appearances

- Rani Chatterjee
- Aleya Ghosh as Paro Shankar Rana from Ishq Ki Dastaan - Naagmani (2022)
- Shruti Anand as Ruchita Nihar Goel from Mann Sundar (2023)

=== Season 2 ===
- Vaibhavi Hankare as Meethi Tripathi / Meethi Rana Sharma: Sanjay and Suman's second daughter; Rana's wife (2023)
- Mohit Hiranandani as
  - Rana Sharma: Jaya and Rakesh's son; Meethi's husband (2023)
  - Pawan: Rana's lookalike; Kavita's husband (2023)
- Harsh Vashisht as Rakesh Sharma: Rakhi's brother; Jaya's husband; Rana's father; Dushyant's murderer (2023)
- Shweta Gautam as Jaya Sharma: Rakesh's wife; Rana's mother (2023)
- Tiya Gandwani as Suman Shukla Tripathi: Girija's daughter; Kailash's sister; Sanjay’s wife; Divya, Meethi and Baby’s mother (2023)
- Roopa Divetia as Girija Shukla: Suman and Kailash's mother; (2023)
- Ashwin Kaushal as Kailash Shukla: Girija's son; Suman's brother; Madhu's husband (2023)
- Shefali Rana as Madhu Shukla: Kailash's wife; Lakshman's mother (2023)
- Karan Chhabra as Deepak: Divya's husband; Princy's father (2023)
- Rajeev Kumar as Sanjay Tripathi: Suman's husband; Divya, Meethi and Baby’s father (2023)
- Hemal Soni as Baby Tripathi: Sanjay and Suman's youngest daughter; Divya and Meethi's sister; Dushyant's girlfriend (2023)
- Keshvee Sisodiya as Divya Tripathi: Sanjay and Suman's elder daughter; Deepak's wife; Prince's mother (2023)
- Yash Bhatia as Lakshman Shukla: Kailash and Madhu's son (2023)
- Nyshita Bajaj as Princy: Deepak and Divya's daughter (2023)
- Priya Mishra as Menaka: Nirmal's daughter; Rana's one-sided obsessive lover (2023)
- Manish Khanna as Nirmal: Menaka's father (2023)
- Ekta Sharma as Rakhi Sharma: Rakesh's sister (2023)
- Shaan Mishra as Dushyant: Baby's boyfriend (2023) (Dead)
- Vaishali Arora as Kavita: Pawan's wife (2023)
- Charanjeet Kaur as Rajani "Rajjo": Tripathi's househelp (2023)
- Mandill Singh (2023)
- Shehzad Sheikh as Pratap Adhikari (2023)
- Lakshya Handa as Pratap's brother (2023)
- Rajesh Dubey as Pandit (2023)

== Production ==
The filming of the show began in October 2021. Producer Gul Khan cast actress Vaibhavi Hankare as well as television actor Shehzad Shaikh, additionally casting Prerna Sharma. Madhavi Gogte was replaced by Kiran Bhargava as the grandmother.

== Adaptations ==
Language	Title	Original release	Network(s)	Last aired	Notes	Ref.
Tamil	Roja ரோஜா	9 April 2018	Sun TV	3 December 2022	Original	
Kannada	Sevanthi ಸೇವಂತಿ	25 February 2019	Udaya TV	Ongoing	Remake	
Telugu	Roja రోజా	11 March 2019	Gemini TV	27 March 2020	Remake	
Hindi	Sindoor Ki Keemat सिंदूर की कीमत	18 October 2021	Dangal TV	29 April 2023	Remake	
Malayalam	Kaliveedu കളിവീട്	15 November 2021	Surya TV	Ongoing	Remake	
Bengali	Saathi সাথী	7 February 2022	Sun Bangla	3 August 2024	Remake	
Odia	Tori Pain To Pain	29 May 2023	Tarang TV	Ongoing	Remake	
Marathi	Tharla Thar Mag	5 December 2022	Star Pravah	Ongoing		

== Soundtrack ==
Piya Tose Milne

Soundtrack album
- Released: 2021
- Genre: Romance
- Length: 3:28
- Language: Hindi
- Label: Enterr10 Television Network
- Producer: Gul Khan

Tracklisting
No.	Title	Length
1.	"Piya Tose Milne"	3:28
2.	"Piya Saware"	3:50
Total length:		7:18
