= Garima Vikrant Singh =

Indian actress (born 1977)

- Born: Garima Srivastav; 27 April 1979 (age 47); Allahabad, Uttar Pradesh, India
- Occupations: Actress; model; dancer
- Years active: 2007–present
- Known for: Ishq Ka Rang Safed; Nimki Mukhiya
- Spouse: Yogesh Vikrant Singh (m. 2001)
- Children: Vera Vikrant Singh
- Parent(s): Manju Srivastav, Yogendra Prasad Srivastav
- Relatives: Gaurav Srivastav (brother)

Garima Vikrant Singh (born Garima Srivastav; 27 April 1979) is an Indian actress best known for her role as Saraswati in Life OK's Gustakh Dil. She appeared in shows like, Choti Bahu Season 2 (Zee TV), Phir Subah Hogi (Zee TV), Rahe Tera Aasheervad (Colors), Chand ke paar Chalo (Imagine) and Parivaar (Zee TV). She has also worked with Rajkumar Santoshi's movie Halla Bol. She also played the role of Dulari in Colors's Ishq Ka Rang Safed. Garima played the role of a Bihari woman in Nimki Mukhiya. She had played the Role of Saroj Rajput at Color's Namak Issk Ka.

== Television ==
Year	Title	Role	Ref.
2005	CID	Episodic Role	
2007–2008	Parrivaar		
2008–2009	Rahe Tera Aashirwaad	Guru Mata	
2008–2009	Chand Ke Paar Chalo	Anisa's mother	
2011–2012	Chotti Bahu	Radhika's step-mother	
2012–2013	Phir Subah Hogi	Garima Shrivastav	
2013–2014	Gustakh Dil	Saraswati	
2015–2016	Ishq Ka Rang Safed	Dulaari	
2017–2018	Nimki Mukhiya	Anaro	
2019	Nazar	Panna Sachdev	
2019–2020	Yehh Jadu Hai Jinn Ka!	Salma Janesar	
2020–2021	Namak Issk Ka	Saroj Rajput	
2024	Pukaar – Dil Se Dil Tak	Mayuri Rathi	
2025	Gram Chikitsalay	Indu	
2025–2026	Shehzaadi... Hai Tu Dil Ki	Chitralekha Kothari	
2026	Family Kirana Store	Sunita	

== Filmography ==
Year	Title	Role
2008	Halla Bol	Lady Minister

== Web series ==
Year	Title	Role	Platform	Notes
2024	Maamla Legal Hai	Adv. Sagarika	Netflix	Season 1
2025	Gram Chikitsalay	Indu	Prime Video	Season 1
