= Geeta Tyagi =

Indian actress

- Born: Dehradun, Uttarakhand, India
- Education: Jawaharlal Nehru University
- Occupation: Actress
- Years active: 1996–present
- Spouse: Vijay Tyagi
- Children: 2

Geeta Tyagi is an Indian television and film actress. She is known for portraying the role of Shashikala Singh Rathore in Doli Armaano Ki, Bimla Agarwal on Aap Ke Aa Jane Se on Zee TV.

== Career ==
She is an alumna of the National School of Drama, passing out in 1996. In 2009, she bagged the role of Nalini in Dehleez. In 2012, she starred in the series Punar Vivah as Shobha Satyendra Dubey. In 2013, she was cast in Ek Boond Ishq as Aradhana, as well as Shashikala Rudrapratap Singh Rathore in Doli Armaano Ki. In 2016, she joined the cast of Ek Duje Ke Vaaste as Manju Tiwari. In late 2017, she was cast in Aap Ke Aa Jane Se as Bimla Agarwal. Then she was seen as Rajrani in the TV show Kyun Utthe Dil Chhod Aaye. She was last playing the role of Raghav Rao's mother in Mehndi Hai Rachne Waali.

== Filmography ==
=== Film ===
Year	Title	Role	Notes
2009	Zor Lagaa Ke...Haiya!		
2009	What's Your Raashee?	Anila Kamdar	

=== Television ===
Year	Title	Role	Notes
1997	Margarita	Kancha	
2005	Apne Mere Apne (DD National)	Priya	DD National
2008	Balika Vadhu	Jamuna Basant Singh	
2009	Dehleez	Nalini	
2010	Chand Chupa Badal Mein	Hemlata Pratap Sharma	
2012–2013	Punar Vivah	Shobha Satyendra Dubey	
2013	Ek Boond Ishq	Aradhana	
2013-2015	Doli Armaano Ki	Shashikala Rudrapratap Singh Rathore	
2015	Dream Girl — Ek Ladki Deewani Si	Bua Ji	
2016	Ek Duje Ke Vaaste	Manju Tiwari	
2018–2019	Aap Ke Aa Jane Se	Bimla Agarwal	
2019–2020	Vidya	Mamta Singh	
2021	Kyun Utthe Dil Chhod Aaye	Rajrani Sahni	
2021	Mehndi Hai Rachne Waali	Jaya	
2023–2024	Aaina	Rajkumari Singh	
2024	Pehla Pyaar Less Than 1% Chance	Murli’s mother	
2025	Apollena – Sapno Ki Unchi Udann	Saraswati Pandey	
2025	Jaadu Teri Nazar - Daayan Ka Mausam	Sharda	
2025–present	Jagadhatri	Rekha Naik	
2026-present	Mann Sundar	Subhadra Maheshwari	
