= Shamshaan Champa =

Indian Super natural television series

- Genre: Drama; Supernatural; Mystery
- Created by: Gul Khan
- Written by: Dialogues; Divya Nidhi Sharma; Aparajitha Sharma
- Screenplay by: Shivangi Singh
- Story by: Shivangi Singh; Anubhav Paaruthi
- Directed by: Afzal Sayyad
- Starring: Trupti Mishra; Ayush Shrivastava; Antara Biswas
- Opening theme: Shamshaan Champa
- Composer: Elvish Valentine
- Country of origin: India
- Original language: Hindi
- No. of seasons: 1
- No. of episodes: 40

Production
- Producers: Ghul Khan; Karishma Jain
- Editors: Shashank Harendra Singh; Flying Toys
- Camera setup: Multi-camera
- Running time: 22 minutes approx
- Production company: 4 Lions Films

Original release
- Network: Shemaroo Umang
- Release: 20 August – 4 October 2024

Shamshaan Champa (transl. Cremation's Flower) is an Indian Hindi-language supernatural horror, mystery television series that aired from 20 August 2024 to 5 October 2024 on Shemaroo Umang under the banner of 4 Lions Films. It starts Trupti Mishra, Ayush Shrivastava and Antara Biswas.

== Plot ==
Champa was a girl who was falsely accused by the villagers of being a witch. They burned her under the Kaal Vruksh. It is believed that whoever dies under the Kaal Vruksh becomes an evil witch. However, Champa becomes a good witch and helps people instead.

== Cast ==
- Trupti Mishra as Champa: a Good Dayan, Tara's Sister, Vikram's Wife
- Ayush Shrivastava as Vikram
- Antara Biswas as Mohini
- Anjali Sharma as Kiran
- Palak Rana as Pushpa; Champa's sister
- Yash Bhatia as Akshay
- Sanchi Daudkar as Tara
- Vaishnavi Chaudhary as Rekha
- Inderjeet Modi as Dhruv
- Tia Gandwani as Urvashi, Vikram's Mother
- Mahima Mishra as Shivani
- Monica Gupta as Chachi
- Mohammad Nazim as Shakti Singh Rathore: Vikram's father
- Priyanjali Uniyal as Chitralekha
- Jya mishra
- Arsheen Namdar as Rambha
