= 4 Lions Films =

Indian production company

- Industry: Entertainment
- Founded: 2008
- Founders: Gul Khan
- Headquarters: Mumbai, India
- Key people: Gul Khan; Gorky M; Nissar Parvez; Karishma Jain
- Products: Television programs
- Number of employees: 200
- Website: www.4lionsfilms.com

4 Lions Films is a production house based in Mumbai, India. Founded in 2008, its primary focus is youth-oriented and general entertainment shows.

== Operations ==
The production house has produced successful shows like Geet... Hui Sabse Parayi, Iss Pyaar Ko Kya Naam Doon?, Qubool Hai, Ishqbaaaz, Kullfi Kumarr Bajewala, Yehh Jaadu Hai Jinn Ka and Imlie.

== Former programs ==
Year(s)	Show	Channel	Ref.
2008–2009	Chand Ke Paar Chalo	NDTV Imagine	
2010–2011	Geet... Hui Sabse Parayi	Star One	
2011–2012	Iss Pyaar Ko Kya Naam Doon?	StarPlus	
2011–2012	Humse Hai Liife	Channel V India	
2012–2013	Suvreen Guggal – Topper of The Year	Channel V India	
2012–2014	Arjun	StarPlus	
2012–2016	Qubool Hai	Zee TV	
2014–2015	Humsafars	SET	
2014	O Gujariya: Badlein Chal Duniya	Channel V India	
2015–2016	Adhuri Kahaani Hamari	&TV	
2016	Kahani Hamari... Dil Dosti Deewanepan Ki	&TV	
2016–2019	Ishqbaaaz	StarPlus	
2017	Dil Boley Oberoi	StarPlus	
2017	Iss Pyaar Ko Kya Naam Doon 3	StarPlus	
2018–2020	Kullfi Kumarr Bajewala	StarPlus	
2018–2020	Nazar	StarPlus	
2019	Dil Toh Happy Hai Ji	StarPlus	
2019–2020	Yehh Jadu Hai Jinn Ka!	StarPlus	
2020	Nazar 2	StarPlus	
2020–2024	Imlie	StarPlus	
2020–2021	Namak Issk Ka	Colors TV	
2021	Ishk Par Zor Nahi	SET	
2021	Ankahee Dastaan	StarPlus	
2021–2022	Chikoo Ki Mummy Durr Kei	StarPlus	
2021–2023	Sindoor Ki Keemat	Dangal TV	
2022	Fanaa: Ishq Mein Marjawan	Colors TV	
2023	Sindoor Ki Keemat 2	Dangal TV	
2024	Shamshaan Champa	Shemaroo Umang	
2024	Abeer Gulal	Colors Marathi	
2024–2025	Apollena – Sapno Ki Unchi Udann	Colors TV	
2024–2025	Prem Leela	Dangal TV	
2025	Jaadu Teri Nazar – Daayan Ka Mausam	StarPlus	
TBA	Janna Yongha Maraka	Colors TV	

=== Web series ===
Year	Title	Platform	Ref.
2015	Iss Pyaar Ko Kya Naam Doon? – Ek Jashn	Disney+ Hotstar	
2017	Tanhaiyan	Disney+ Hotstar	
2022	Aashiqana - Murder Ke Mausam Mein Pyaar	Disney+ Hotstar	

== See also ==
- List of accolades received by Ishqbaaaz
