= Kaleerein =

Indian television soap opera drama

- Genre: Drama
- Created by: Priya Mishra; Raaga Studio
- Written by: Amit Babbar
- Screenplay by: Anupama Yadhav; Bhavna Vyas; Ankush Nagpal
- Story by: Priya Mishra; Aanad Vardhan; Sonali Jaffar
- Directed by: Hemant N mishra
- Creative directors: Meet Kohli; Saurabh Arora; Raaga Arif
- Starring: Arjit Taneja; Aditi Sharma
- Theme music composer: Jitesh Panchal
- Country of origin: India
- Original language: Hindi • Punjabi
- No. of seasons: 1
- No. of episodes: 198

Production
- Producers: Nikhil Sinha; Sohanna Sinha
- Production locations: Patiala; Mumbai
- Cinematography: Rajan Singh; Karan Indoriya
- Editors: Satya Sharma; Shamsher Alam
- Camera setup: Multi-camera
- Running time: 22–24 minutes (approx.)
- Production company: Triangle Films

Original release
- Network: Zee TV
- Release: 5 February – 16 November 2018

Kaleerein is an Indian television series that premiered on 5 February 2018 on Zee TV. Produced by Nikhil and Sohanna Sinha, it starred Arjit Taneja and Aditi Sharma. It replaced Aisi Deewangi Dekhi Nahi Kahi in its timeslot. And was replaced by Manmohini .

== Plot ==
Meera Dhingra is a free-spirited, young independent woman who loves to play Kabaddi and does not want to be well-groomed for her future husband. She believes that a woman loses her natural traits after enrolling in a grooming school. However, her mother persistently pressurizes her to marry and shape herself into an ideal, well-groomed, upper-class wife; to fulfil her desire to see her daughter get married after constant proposal rejections. She believes that Meera can only be socially acceptable by changing herself by going to Soni Kudi Academy. However, Meera is strongly against the idea and believes that she should only marry someone who loves her the way she is.

Vivaan is a rich business tycoon and an NRI from London. He comes back to India on his sister Amaya's wish and searching for his long-lost mother, Pammi Kapoor, who left them as a child. Although he has a hatred for his biological mother; he secretly yearns to meet her. Vivaan's trust issues stem from his abandonment, and he promises himself never to marry. Vivaan does not believe in marriage, whereas Meera believes that she wants her life partner to love and understand her imperfections.

Meera's alliance is fixed with Sumair (Paramvir Cheema), but in a comedy of errors, she ends up meeting Vivaan at the airport. Their opinionated personalities clash, and they argue. It is later revealed that Vivaan is the landlord of Kapoor Mansion, of which the Dhingras are caretakers. While Vivaan and Amaya live in the same house, Meera's wedding preparations begin. While Vivaan believes Meera to be a gold digger, Meera hates Vivaan's egoistic personality. Meera secretly harbours the desire to play a qualifying kabaddi match on her wedding day. Vivaan initially befriends Meera to extract information about a bangle in her possession, which resembles his mother's, but they start caring for each other over time, unbeknownst to themselves. Sumair, who initially understands Meera's stand, is slowly revealed to be a man who has his own expectations from his wife-to-be. Meera complies for the sake of her family and, finding no support from her fiance, decides to groom herself. Vivaan and Meera, on the other hand, constantly bicker, but Vivaan ends up saving her from the sticky situations that she lands in owing to her wedding preparations. While Sumair is gradually shown to be a shallow-minded person, Vivaan comes across as a liberal, open-minded individual, albeit with his own imperfections.

Sumair falls in love with Meera's cousin Silky. He has no regard for Meera, and to pull himself out of the wedding, he makes a fake MMS clip of Meera and Vivaan Romancing and airs it on the wedding day. He manipulates Meera into believing that it was Vivaan who made the video for which she slaps Vivaan. Meera is abused and bad mouthed by village goons, but Vivaan saves her. They marry to save Meera's dignity. But they decide to divorce after their wedding as they're not happy. However, they decide to hide their impending divorce from Meera's family till the situation cools down. Meanwhile, Vivaan's stepmother and business partner Roma Kapoor (Shilpa Saklani) comes to live in Kapoor Mansion with the agenda of breaking the couple's relationship. However, Meera and Vivaan become friends and gradually start falling in love, but this irks Roma. She creates many misunderstandings between the couple and manipulates Vivaan, who already has contempt for his birth mother, believing that Pammi Kapoor wants to kill Amaya and him. Meera refuses to believe this, which becomes the root cause of clashes and separation. The divorce keeps coming up between them. Eventually, Pammi Kapoor is revealed as Soni Kudi's owner Mrs Singh. Roma is exposed, and all allegations against Pammi are quelled, and they reunite as one happy family.

Vivaan and Meera decide to express their love for each other, but unfortunately, happy times do not last long, and Pammi and Amaya are kidnapped. Vivaan is blackmailed, and a series of events lead to Pammi's death and Amaya being in a coma. Vivaan misunderstands Meera and blames her for interfering in the kidnapping mess and thus causing Pammi's death. Meera tries very hard to prove her innocence to Vivaan but no avail, and he decides to divorce her. He starts hating on Meera when she refuses to divorce him and troubles her to no end with harsh words and actions. But a series of events lead Meera and Vivaan to the alleged kidnapper, where Meera saves Vivaan from being shot at by taking the bullet herself. Vivaan's misunderstandings are cleared, and he tries to win back her love, berating himself for believing a wrong and contrived version of events. Unfortunately, Meera's father gives Meera the ultimatum to choose between himself and Vivaan. Meera chooses her father forcefully and is also hurt by Vivaan's past actions, but this does not stop Vivaan. He enters the Dhingra household as a cook to prove he will do anything for Meera. Meera's father creates many problems for Vivaan and continuously insults him. However, he puts up with it for Meera's sake. Finally, Meera's father finds a good groom for her, also his best friend's son. This marks the entry of Sunny into their lives. Meanwhile, Meera makes the mistake of agreeing to the wedding to teach Vivaan a lesson without realizing the storm that is about to enter their lives.

Sunny pretends to be a good guy who wants to ruin Meera and Vivaan's love. Vivaan and Meera fight against Sunny with courage. He tries to separate them by sending Vivaan to jail and blackmailing Meera but in vain. He is arrested by police later.

Vivaan and Meera have peaceful life. Meanwhile, the gifts his late mother's Soni Kudi academy to Meera. But his past starts haunting him. Paromita was Vivaan's friend, she was in love with him, but he never loved her. Meera gets visions about how Vivaan was responsible for Paromita's death and decides to expose him in front of the world for causing an innocent's death and for hiding it. She stages a drama narrating the sequence of events at Soni Kudi academy, but later, Vivaan proves himself innocent. But Paromita's sister Tulika (Swati Kapoor) comes for revenge from Vivaan as he had refused to marry her sister. Vivaan and Meera consummate their marriage. The show takes a supernatural turn, but at the end, they reunite, and the show ends with Meera being pregnant, silky getting married, and the whole family celebrating.

== Cast ==
=== Main ===
- Arjit Taneja as Vivaan Kapoor: Pammi Kapoor's son, Amaya's Brother, Meera's husband
- Aditi Sharma as Meera Kapoor (née Dhingra): Amar and Dolly's daughter, Nimmo and Prince's sister, Vivaan's wife, Pammi Kapoor's daughter in law

=== Recurring ===
- Vishavpreet Kaur as Pammi Kapoor: CEO of Soni Kudi Academy; Vivaan and Amaya's mother; Meera's mother in law
- Nisha Nayak as Amaya Kapoor: Pammi's daughter; Vivaan's Sister
- Neena Cheema as Beeji: Amar, Bittu and Laali's mother; Meera, Nimmo, Meher, Prince and Simran and Silky's grandmother
- Jaswinder Gardner as Dolly Dhingra: Amar's wife; Meera, Nimmo and Prince's mother
- Sagar Saini as Amar Dhingra: Dolly's wife; Meera, Nimmo and Prince's father
- Ekroop Bedi as Nimmo Dhingra: Amar and Dolly's daughter; Meera and Prince's sister, Puppy's girlfriend
- Ayush Gupta as Prince Dhingra: Amar and Dolly's son; Meera and Nimmo's brother, Tullika's husband
- Ashu Sharma as Bittu Dhingra: Sweety's husband; Meher and Simran's father
- Ritu Vashistha as Sweety Dhingra: Bittu's wife; Meher and Simran's mother
- Khushi Mishra as Meher Dhingra: Bittu and Sweety's daughter; Simran's Sister
- Snehal Pandey as Simran Dhingra: Bittu and Sweety's daughter; Meher's sister
- Mamta Verma as Laali: Amar and Bittu's sister; Silky's mother; Sunny's mother in law
- Prachi Bansal as Silky: Laali's daughter; Sunny's wife; Sumer's girlfriend
- Aaghnya Bisht as Silky, Meera, Nimmo, Meher, Prince and Simran's cousin, Sumer's girlfriend, Sunny's wife
- Paramvir Cheema Singh as Sumer Kapoor: Suman's son; Meera's childhood friend and ex-fiancé; Silky's boyfriend
- Tasneem Ali as Suman Kapoor: Sumer's mother
- Aditi Rawat as Jaspreet “Preeto” Kaur: Meera's best friend
- Shilpa Saklani as Roma Kapoor: Vivaan and Amaya's step-mother, Sunny's mother; Meera's stepmother -in-law
- Manraj Singh as Sunny Kapoor: Roma's long-lost son, Vivaan and Amaya's step brother, Silky's husband
- Nikunj Malik as Paromita, Vivaan's friend who was in love with him; Tulika's Sister
- Swati Kapoor as Tulika Dhingra: Paromita's sister and Prince's wife
- Priom Gujjar Chaudhary as Rohan Malhotra: one of Meera's suitors
- Vikas Rao as Sumer's friend
- Paras Chhabra as Tommy Singh, a contract killer
- Mrinalini Tyagi as Sherri Singh, a contract killer
- Ambuj Mathur as Pappi, a drug-dealer, Nimmo's “boyfriend”

=== Guests ===
- Juhi Aslam as a Black Magic performer
- Amrapali Gupta as a Black Magic performer
- Rithvik Dhanjani and Asha Negi to perform in Sangeet
- Pavitra Punia as Vishkanya, a shape-shifting snake

== Production ==
=== Filming ===
Based on the backdrop of Punjab, the series was mainly filmed in Mumbai while some initial sequences were shot in Patiala.
