= Nazar (TV series) =

Indian supernatural television series

- Also known as: The Evil Eye
- Genre: Supernatural; Thriller; Drama; Romance
- Created by: Gul Khan; Mrinal Jha
- Based on: Dayan (witch)
- Story by: Mrinal Jha; Dialogues: Divy Nidhi Sharma Aparajita Sharma
- Directed by: Atif Khan
- Starring: Monalisa; Niyati Fatnani; Harsh Rajput; Shruti Sharma; Sheezan Khan
- Theme music composer: Tapas Relia
- Opening theme: "Saajna" (season 1); "Janiya" (season 2)
- Composer: Sanjeev Srivastava
- Country of origin: India
- Original language: Hindi
- No. of seasons: 2
- No. of episodes: 432

Production
- Producers: Gul Khan; Karishma Jain
- Editor: Shashank H. Singh
- Camera setup: Multi camera
- Running time: 22 minutes
- Production company: 4 Lions Films

Original release
- Network: StarPlus
- Release: 30 July 2018 – 20 March 2020

Related
- Nojor

Nazar (transl. Evil Eye) is an Indian supernatural thriller series produced by 4 Lions Films and directed by Atif Khan that airs on StarPlus and streams digitally on Disney+ Hotstar.

Season 1 of the franchise aired from 30 July 2018 to 18 February 2020. It starred Monalisa, Niyati Fatnani, and Harsh Rajput and performed well in TRP charts apart from gaining popularity.

Season 2 of the franchise, which replaced Season 1, premiered on 19 February 2020 and starred Monalisa and Shruti Sharma. Despite having good ratings, the second season of Nazar went off-air due to the pandemic situation of COVID-19 and its high production demand.

A telefilm of Nazar premiered on Star Plus on 10 October 2021 under the name Ankahee Dastaan – Nazar.

== Seasons ==
Season	Episodes	Originally broadcast (India)	
Season	Episodes	First aired	Last aired
1	409	30 July 2018	18 February 2020
2	23	19 February 2020	20 March 2020

== Plot ==
=== Season 1 ===
In the year 2000, Mohana, a 250 -year-old daayan who has managed to extend her parasitic existence by sapping the life-force of her victims. Residing in Bhandap, she bewitches businessman Mridul Rathod and eventually ties the knot with him. Together, they have two children, Ansh and Kajal. As Mohana aids her husband in accumulating immense wealth through the use of dark sorcery, she gradually takes away his vitality, ultimately leading to his untimely death.

This unfortunate turn of events prompts Vedashree Rathod, Mridul Rathod's sister-in-law, to grow concerned. She seeks assistance from her friend Divya Sharma, a psychic wizardess and a member of the reevaavanshi, a clan of evil hunters, known for their ability to ward off evil eye. Divya thwarts Mohana's malevolent influence by severing her plait, rendering Mohana powerless. Mohana then escapes into the woods, but they pursue her along with a mob of villagers holding torches. Once cornered, Mohana was set on fire which turns her into stone. Divya seals Mohana in a coffin within a temple, safeguarded by powerful mantras. Not long after these events, Divya mysteriously disappears. Vedashree and her husband, Shekhar Rathod, adopt Ansh and Kajal. Yet Mohana's nazar still lurks on the family as she is a unique and very powerful Daayan called the Ekaayan.

=== Season 2 ===
Palak, a compassionate woman living with a hole in her heart, finds herself compelled to enter a marriage of convenience with Apurv, a man afflicted by severe mental instability and an intellectual age equivalent to that of a five-year-old. She makes this difficult choice to secure the money required to cover her sister Naina's hospital bills. As time passes, an unexpected and genuine love blossoms between them. Meanwhile, Apurv's sinister sister, Madhulika, a daayan, harbors sinister intentions to sacrifice Apurv during the upcoming Purnima night, aiming to attain an Ekayan status. She has killed everyone who found out the truth about her. She has repeatedly stopped Apurv's marriage attempts, but her plans fail when she encounters Palak's divine powers that disrupt her malevolent pursuits. Frustrated by her repeated failures, Madhulika dispatches Girgit Behrupi in an attempt to kill Palak. However, Palak's newfound awareness of her daivik powers allows her to triumph over Behrupi. The story concludes on a cliffhanger.

== Cast ==
=== Season 1 ===
==== Main ====
- Monalisa as Mohana Rathod; An Ekaayan Dayaan; Pratimaayan's eldest daughter; (2018–2020)
- Niyati Fatnani as Piya Rathod (née Sharma): A Daivik; Nishant and Divya's elder daughter; (2018–2020)
- Harsh Rajput in dual role as
  - Ansh Rathod:Daavansh; Mridul and Mohana's elder son; (2018–2020)
  - Karan Rathod: Daavansh; Mridul and Mohana's younger son; (2019)

==== Recurring ====
- Ritu Chaudhary as
  - Vedashree Rathod: Pratima's seocnd daughter; (2018–2020)
  - Kalashree: Daayan; Pratima's third daughter; (2019)
- Sumit Kaul as Prof. Nishant Sharma: An Reevavanshi; Trishila's brother; (2018–2020)
- Smita Bansal as Divya Sharma: a shape-shifting serpent; Vedashree's friend; (2018–2019)
- Amit Kaushik as Shekhar Rathod: Mridul, Jaya and Avinash's brother; (2018–2020)
- Ashita Dhawan as Chaitali Rathod: Avinash's wife; (2018–2020)
- Kapil Soni as ACP Avinash Rathod: Shekhar, Mridul and Jaya's brother; (2018–2020)
- Aamir S Khan as Naman Kabra: Gurumaa's son; Piya's ex-fiancé; (2018–2020)
- Sreejita De as
  - Dilruba: Chudail (2018–2020)
  - Sanam: Mayank's ex-fiancé; Naman's wife; (2019)
- Simran Budharup as Saavi Sharma: Divya and Nishant's younger daughter; (2018–2020)
- Sumit Bhardwaj as Mayank: Asuransh; Panna's adopted son; (2019)
- Jigyasa Singh as Tara Khanna: Jaya's elder daughter; (2019)
- Sonyaa Ayoddhya as Ruby: a Chalayaan; Bhaisasur's daughter; (2018–2019)
- Diaan Talaviya as Aditya Rathod: Daivik and Daavansh; Piya and Ansh's son; (2019–2020)
  - Kiara Bhanushali as Baby Aditya "Munna" Rathod (2019)
- Kisha Arora as Pari Rathod: a Daayan; Piya and Ansh's daughter; (2019–2020)
- Jatin Bhardwaj as Rishi Rathod: Chaitali and Avinash's son; (2018–2019)
- Resham Prashant as Neha Rathod: Chaitali and Avinash's daughter; (2018–2019)
- Pallavi Gupta as Kajal Rathod: Mohana and Mridul's daughter; (2018–2019)
- Amardeep Jha as Veena Devi "Gurumaa": Priestess; Naman's mother (2018–2019)
- Priya Malik as Dola: a Dukayaan Daayan; Pratima's youngest daughter; Mohana's sister; Vedashree and Kalashree's sister; Ruby's adoptive mother (2019)
- Malhar Pandya as Angad: a Singha; Mohana's fiancée (2019)
- Stavan Shinde as Dev: a Daivik; Piya's obsessive lover (2019)
- Salina Prakash as Pratima / Pratimaayan: World's First Ekaayan; Mohana, Vedashree, Kalashree and Dola's mother (2019)
- Sana Amin Sheikh as Urvashi / Bhasmika: Daayan; Ansh's ex fiance (2019)
- Garima Vikrant Singh as Panna: Rakshasa; Tamra and Neelam's mother; Mayank's adoptive mother (2019)
- Isha Sharma as Trishila Sharma: Reevavanshi; Nishant's sister, who has powers to bring the dead alive (2019)
- Sabina Jat as Tamra: Panna's daughter; Neelam's sister; Mayank's adoptive sister; Saavi's colleague (2019)
- Shalini Arora as Jaya Rathod Khanna: Shekhar, Mridul and Avinash's sister; Tara and Koyal's mother (2019)
- Gouri Agarwal as Koyal Khanna: Jaya's younger daughter, Tara's sister (2019)
- Narayani Shastri as Devika (2019)
- Sikandar Kharbanda as Rudra Pratap Singh: Military officer (2019)
- Vishnu Sharma as Tej Singh: Rathod family's priest; an acquaintance of Nishant and Gurumaa (2018–2020)
- Kushagre Dua as Snake Survansh (2019)
- Ritu Shivpuri as Shalaka: Shardul and Rahul's mother (2019)
- Kingkini Bhattacharya as Mansi Rathod: Daayan; Karan's wife; Krish's mother; Mohana's helper (2019)
- Moni Rai as Abhiraj: Mohana's victim (2018)
- Ankur Nayyar as Mridul Rathod: Shekhar, Jaya and Avinash's brother; Mohana's husband; Ansh, Karan and Kajal's father (2018)

=== Season 2 ===
==== Main ====
- Monalisa as Madhulika Chaudhary: Daayan; Mohana's reincarnation; Urvashi and Dev's daughter; Apurv, Hema and Malini's sister (2020)
- Shruti Sharma as Palak Verma Chaudhary: Daivik; Naina's sister; Apurv's wife (2020)
- Sheezan Khan as Apurv Singh Chaudhary: Daavansh; Urvashi and Dev's son; Madhulika, Hema and Malini's brother; Palak's husband (2020)

==== Recurring ====
- Nisha Nagpal as Vishala: Daayan; Madhulika's sworn enemy (2020)
- Anjali Gupta as Urvashi Chaudhary: Dev's wife; Madhulika, Hema, Malini and Apurv's mother (2020)
- Monal Jagtani as Hema Chaudhary: Urvashi and Dev's daughter; Madhulika, Malini and Apurv's sister (2020)
- Reema Vohra as Malini Chaudhary: Urvashi and Dev's daughter; Madhulika, Hema and Apurv's sister (2020)
- Gargi Patel / Alka Kaushal as Narmada Chaudhary: Dev's mother; Madhulika, Apurv, Hema and Malini's grandmother (2020)
- Abhayshankar Jha as Borath Nath: Chaudhary family's priest (2020)
- Vishnu Sharma as Gurudev (2020)
- Bhakti Narula as Sarita Parekh: Chaudhary family's maid; Randeep's wife (2020)
- Raju Shrestha as Randeep Parekh: Palak and Naina's mother's brother; Sarita's husband (2020)
- Tammana Mannan as Naina Verma: Palak's sister (2020)
- Nikhil Mehta as Chameleon Girgit Behrupi (2020)

== Production ==
This series was originally planned for 100 episodes, but the positive response to the series extended its run. In August 2019, the storyline of the series took a leap of six years.

In the first week of February 2020, producer Gul Khan confirmed the end of season 1 and production of season 2 of the series. On 14 February 2020, the teaser of season 2 was released featuring Antara Biswas. Later, the promo featuring Antara Biswas and Sheezan Khan was released.

Due to COVID-19 outbreak, on 19 March 2020 the shootings were stalled until 31 March 2020 before lockdown was announced. However, on 25 March 2020 lockdown was announced for 21 days then was extended till 3 May and again extended and the shootings could not resume after it. On 20 March 2020, the series was halted airing and was supposed to return after lockdown. But, as the lockdown was extended longer than expected and shootings were stalled indefinitely. In May 2020 the series' cancellation was confirmed. It was due to the high budget of the series causing losses. On 10 October 2021, The series came back as a telefilm with a new plot and twists under the title Ankahee Daastaan-Nazar which was telecasted on 10 October 2021.

== Reception ==
=== Critical response ===
India Today stated, "Although there is no dearth of chudails, dayans and shaitans in Indian TV, Gul's dayan stands apart. The character is loud and over the top, but is well-written and has a fascinating back story. Mona Lisa as Mohona is impressive, and the show is able to hold the interest of the viewer despite being a daily."

After its premiere, it received negative criticism from The Times of India which stated, "Right from the beginning to the end, the show fails to hold you as it is highly dramatic, and the background music adds to the woes. The railway station, the forest and the havelis are typical elements used in a supernatural thriller. They bring no novelty. The plot is incoherent as the background of the characters is not explained well. The show is painfully slow, the story is patchy and so are the scenes. Dialogues are retro and filmy. The list can go on. Monalisa and Harsh Rajput disappoint as actors. They play their parts with zero efficiency. The supporting cast is again average at its best."

However, speaking about the success of the series, The Times of India stated, "The majority of the scenes are shot using chroma and the makers add special effects that add to the quality of the episodes. The makers have made a make-believe world with Mohana's story and it's quite an enchanting and exciting one just like your dadima's childhood 'evil vs good' stories".

=== Ratings ===
The first season opened to a TRP of 1.8 and 4.2 million impressions featuring in top 20 shows.

== Soundtrack ==
Nazar Original Sound Track

Soundtrack album by Sanjeev Srivastava
- Released: 17 August 2018
- Genres: Romance; Soundtrack
- Language: Hindi
- Label: Star India
- Producer: Gul Khan

Nazar's soundtrack is written by Divy Nidhi Sharma and composed by Sanjeev Srivastava. Tapas Relia composed the background score for the show. "Saajna", the theme song of the first season was performed by Bhaven Dhanak and Pamela Jain. "Janiya" was also sung by Bhaven Dhanak and Pamela Jain, and was used for the second season.

Nazar: Tracklisting
No.	Title	Artist	Length
1.	"Saajna" (Male)	Bhaven Dhanak	3:38
2.	"Saajna" (Female)	Pamela Jain	5:32
3.	"Saajna" (Duet)	Bhaven Dhanak; Pamela Jain	5:26
4.	"Janiya" (Male Version)	Bhaven Dhanak	3:32
5.	"Janiya" (Female)	Pamela Jain	2:53
6.	"Janiya" (Duet)	Bhaven Dhanak; Pamela Jain	5:00

== Adaptations ==
Language	Title	Original release	Network(s)	Last aired	Notes
Bengali	Nojor নজর	18 March 2019	Star Jalsha	3 November 2019	Remake

== Crossover ==
In 2019, Nazar and Divya Drishti had a collaboration where Antara Biswas (Mohana) entered Divya Drishti and partnered with Sangita Ghosh (Pishachini).

== See also ==
- List of Hindi supernatural shows
- List of programmes broadcast by StarPlus
