= Hans Raj Model School =

School in Delhi, India

Hansraj Model School
- Punjabi Bagh, New Delhi, Delhi; Republic of India

Information
- Type: Private
- Established: 1966
- Founder: Dayanand Saraswati
- Authority: DAV College Management Committee
- Principal: Mrs. Heemal Handu Bhat
- Faculty: 300
- Grades: Kindergarten, Class 1 - 12
- Age: 3 to 18
- Enrollment: 6400
- Campus size: 9.5 acres (38,000 m^{2})
- Campus type: Urban
- Affiliation: CBSE
- Website: https://hansrajmodelschool.org/

Hans Raj Model School (HRMS) is a co-educational private school in Punjabi Bagh, New Delhi, India, providing education to students from kindergarten through the 12th grade, it is situated in the suburbs of West Delhi, spans 8 acres of green lawns, with its kindergarten division housed in a separate 1.5-acre campus. The school was recognised as one of the ’Top’ schools of West Delhi in C-Fore surveys by Hindustan Times in 2009, 2012, and 2016.

== History ==
The school was founded by Swami Dayanand Saraswati in 1966 at New Delhi. Following the principles of Mahatma Hansraj, the school is a part of the 900+ schools and colleges managed by D.A.V. College Managing Committee in India and overseas.

The founding principal of the school was Mr. Tilak Raj Gupta, an educationalist who is known for his scheme of imparting free education to children of various sections of the society in the year 1984 for which he has also received the lifetime achievement by the National Progressive Schools’ Conference, India.

== Vanasthali ==
As part of the school curriculum, environmental conservation is emphasized. An adjacent 6-acre (24,000 m2) site has been transformed into a children's forest with a garden of Good-Will International, where approximately 4000 trees have been planted by students and dignitaries.

== Educational approach ==
During the 2020 lockdown due to COVID-19 pandemic in India, the school shut off its offline operations but conducted a virtual investiture ceremony of the prefectorial board of the 2020-21 batch.

== Extra curricular ==
=== Sports ===
There is a skating rink, cricket and football ground, tennis grounds, gymnasium, taekwondo rink, junior and senior department basketball courts aside from a swimming pool. There are evening classes for the sports academy. The students of the school have achieved significant positions in sports including table tennis, lawn tennis, skating, cricket, basketball, gymnastics, handball, golf, etc.

=== Hobbies and activities ===
In 2020, the school engaged in the Fit India Movement launched by PM Narendra Modi by observing a week-long program curated with yoga, traditional Indian games and sessions on maintaining a healthy lifestyle.

== Controversy ==
A 16-year-old boy, Ankit, died after taking a plunge into a swimming pool in a Punjabi Bagh club in West Delhi on Tuesday, June 11, 2003.

The victim was rushed to Agrasen hospital, where he was declared deceased. According to deputy commissioner of police (licensing) G C Dwivedi, the club's licence has been cancelled. "We won't allow swimming in the club until the investigations are completed," said Dwivedi. The incident took place around 7.30 pm. Son of a businessman, Ankit was a student of Hansraj Model school and had passed his Class X examinations this year. He was a regular visitor of the club, the police said. Deputy Commissioner of police (west) Satish Golcha said: "The boy had gone to the pool alone. Five life guards were present on the spot. First-aid equipment was there as well." According to the police, four life guards are deployed in the evening and three in the morning at the pool, which is 16 feet deep. According to sources, there are more than 120 swimming pools in the city with a proper licence. However, the actual number of swimming pools in the city is much more. Additionally, every pool must employ an instructor with adequate knowledge of first aid and artificial respiration. The instructor has to be present till the pool remains open.

During the COVID-19 pandemic, the school was involved in a fee-hike row with the Delhi Parents Association, where almost 288 Delhi schools were alleged to have increased their fees for the new academic session.

== Notable alumni ==
Sanjay Thapar, an ex-Wing Commander of the Indian Air Force and the first Indian to hoist the Tricolor at the North Pole was an alumnus of the school of the class of 1977.

Manika Batra, international tennis player and bronze-medalist at the 2018 Asian Games held in Jakarta is an alumnus of the school of the class of 2013.

2008 Beijing Olympic participant Neha Aggarwal, another table tennis player trained under the guidance of Table Tennis coach Sandeep Gupta - the head coach at Hans Raj Model School's Table Tennis Academy.

Indian stand-up comedian Amit Tandon, who featured in the Netflix show Comedy Premium League also graduated from the school in the year 1993.

Indian television actresses Shraddha Arya and Aditi Sharma (actress, born 1996) are also graduates of Hansraj Model School.

== See also ==
- List of schools in Delhi
