= Nojor =

Indian and Bengali Supernatural series

- Title Poster
- Genre: Supernatural; Thriller
- Created by: Surinder Films
- Based on: Nazar (TV series)
- Written by: Sayantani Bhattacharya; Rupa Banerjee; Priyanka Seth; Mrinal Jha
- Directed by: Rajiv Kumar
- Starring: Diya Mukherjee; John Bhattacharya Sampurna Lahiri
- Voices of: Upali and Amit
- Opening theme: Nojor by Madhuraa Bhattacharya
- Country of origin: India
- Original language: Bengali
- No. of episodes: 198

Production
- Producers: Surinder Singh; Nispal Singh
- Production location: Kolkata
- Cinematography: Paritosh Singh
- Running time: 22 minutes
- Production company: Surinder Films

Original release
- Network: STAR Jalsha
- Release: 18 March – 3 November 2019

Related
- Nazar

Nojor (Bangla: নজর najar; transl. Evil eye) is an Indian Bengali supernatural television series that premiered on 18 March 2019, airing on Star Jalsha and streaming on Hotstar. The series is a remake of Nazar, which aired on StarPlus. The show stars Sampurna Lahiri, of Tara Ami Chokhe Dekhini fame, who made a comeback with Nojor after 10 years, and it featured her in a negative role. The show also starred actress Diya Mukherjee and actor John Bhattacharya in lead role. The series follows the Singha Roy family and the various struggles they face under the evil eye of a daini named Maya.

== Plot ==
The plot is about an evil entity called Maya, a daini, who bewitches the Singha Roy family, and the struggles the family experience under her nojor. The story revolves around Maya, a 200-year-old life-force-sucking daini who kills people to steal their age (vitality) which keeps her young and beautiful. She enchants and captivates Dev Singha Roy by her surreal beauty, after which they marry and have two children, Ayush and Ananya. Maya wins Dev's favour by helping him amass great wealth through black magic while she gradually drains his vitality that leads to his premature death. Maya also kills Dev's mother to hide her secret identity, but the Singha Roy grow suspicious anyway. A worried Debashree Sigha Roy tells of her fears to her friend Shivani (Ishani's mother), a psychic wizardess and a Reebabongshi (monster-hunter), who comes to help Dev's bedevilled family and ward off the evil eye. She cuts Maya's plait, rendering her powerless. Maya then escapes into the woods, but they chase her along with a mob of villagers holding torches. Once cornered, Maya was set on fire which turned her into stone. Yet Maya's evil eye (nojor) still lurks on the family as she is a unique and very powerful daini called "Akaayan". Debashree and Singha Roy (her husband) adopt Dev's children Ayush and Ananya.

=== 18 years later ===
Ayush and Ananya grow up with their cousins Riddhi and Disha and go to a college in a city, far from the village of Sundar pur. Ayush discovers his superpowers but is unaware that he is a "Daanush" (the hybrid offspring of a daini and a human). He can be saved from turning to the dark side only by a girl who has the "Devi-Maa" Durga's symbol as her birthmark and is referred to as the Doibik (divine conduit). Ishani has the symbol of the Devi-Maa behind her neck. Sparks fly between Ayush and Ishani though they didn't see each other.

Ishani who is in search of her lost mother, comes across her father, Akhilesh, who is a professor and a "Revaavanshi" (member of a clan of monster-hunters) and her sister 'Indu'. Maya sends a puppet Dayaan, Tina with a fake Durga symbol to marry Ayush so that Maya can return and also to keep the family from knowing about the real Doibik.

Ayush and Debrashree come under Tina's control during which Tina and Ayush get married while the rest of the family is spellbound and cast into a deep sleep. The marriage releases Maya from the charms and spells that imprisoned her. The Signa Roy family reunites with Maya, and Ayush learns about his real mother. Vashkor, Ishani's childhood friend and obsessive lover, attempts to marry Ishani by taking advantage of his unwell mother, a visually challenged priestess, Guru Maa, who raised Ishani after Shivani's disappearance. Fearing Ayush's budding romance with Ishani, and the growing ties and bonds of the Singharay with Ishani, Maya sends a message summoning an asur named "Kalantakasur" from "Paathaal-Lohk" to scare Ishani away.

Kalantakasur becomes enraged at Maya for cutting his daughter, Tina's plait. To Maya's horror, Kalantakasur begins attacking Ayush instead of Ishani. Ayush fights back with his Daanush super strengths without success. A distressed Ishani invokes the Devi-Maa for help, who swiftly responds to her plea. Ishani enters a tranced religious dance (Thaandov) and manifests her Doibik form, complete with Durga's attire, multiple arms and ashtraas.

Initially, the beast seemed invincible despite multiple strikes, but after Maya tells Ishani the demon's achilles heel, she smites him dead with her trishul. Everyone witnesses the battle and learns that Ishani is the real Doibik. Maya plots again to separate the family from Ishani. She reveals to Ishani that she has trapped her mother Shivani in the form of a bird and threatens to kill Shivani if Ishani doesn't marry Vashkor.

However, Ayush interferes and stops the marriage again. Later, Ayush learns about his Daanush self. Maya proves herself as Deboshree's half-sister by merging her magical plait with Deboshree's plait which shocks all and frightens Sathi. A few days later, Vashkor gains the abilities of a daayan by wearing Tina's cut-off plait and terrorises the Singha Roy family all night to get Maya's plait, but Deboshree revitalises a temporarily weakened Maya by letting daylight into the room at dawn, saving the whole family.

The Singharoy face new challenges after Indu is hypnotised by Maya and releases Rhimjhim, a petni (evil spirit) to hatch a new conspiracy to separate Ishani and Ayush. Rhimjhim makes a "Bhasyachakra" (hex) to capture Ishani and Ayush but Ishani saves Ayush and finds herself trapped inside Rhimjhim's hex. Later at home, Ayush notices Ishani's unusual behaviour and recognize her to be Rhimjhim. He makes Rhimjhim dance in joy with Maya's help due to which Rhimjhim's "Bhasyachakra" breaks, freeing Ishani.

Maya agrees for Ayush and Ishanis marriage and frees Shivani, who is later revealed to be "Sorpini" (Naagin). Maya eventually kills her before which Shivani transfers her serpentine powers to Ishani. Ayush and Ishani get married. Later Ishani learns about Maya's real motive of wanting to feed on Ayush on the day of "Rakt-Chandra Grahan" or (Red Moon eclipse) to become immortal. Ishani falls into an Indefinite sleep and enters "Trishanku-Lok" (dimension between the living and the dead). With the Daivik gone, Ayush turns to the dark side and becomes an extremely powerful daanush who cares for himself but no one else.

However, Ishani returns with the help of a "Trinetra-mani" (a gem powered by Shiva's third eye) and brings Ayush back from the darkness. Finally, Ishani exposes Maya's bad intentions to Singha Roy's after which Ayush expels Maya from their flat. Later Ishani and Ayush consummate their marriage.

Dola, Maya's twin sister and Tina's mother, a "Dukaayan" (two-headed daayan) who rules the "Swapna-Lohk" (dream world) unleashes horror. Tina denies to help Dola and hence the latter enters the real world through a "sleep portal". She frightens the Singha Roy and threatens to kill Ayush. With Akhilesh's help, the Singharoys attack Dola using "Makarketh" flowers on the muhurta of Makar Sankranti killing her in the process, however Dola is revived by Maya. The sisters fool Ishani into transferring her serpentine powers to Ayush. Believing that Ishani is devoid of powers, the sisters take advantage of the opportunity and try to burn her alive using a special fuel called "Tharal-agni".

Ishani invokes Devi-Maa for help, who sends her vahan to rescue Ishani. She quickly assumes her daivik form to slay the daayans. Maya and Dola are turned into stone statues however they are freed by Tina to regain her powers. A "Sarp" (snake-man) hypnotises Ayush and steals his Sarpika powers. He disguises himself as Ayush and targets Ishani's Trinetra-mani gem. Ayush and Ishani combine their powers and defeat the Sarp.

To Maya's horror, she feeds on the serpent disguised as Ayush during the muhurta of "Red-moon eclipse" but having eaten a snake, Maya becomes a "Sarpayini" possessing combined powers. Dola shows Maya's horoscope which predicts that Ayush's child will put an end to her. The Singha Roy celebrate Ishani's pregnancy. Ayush learns about Maya's intentions to kill Ishani and their unborn child. Realising the danger, Ayush decides to separate from Ishani till the baby is born. With heavy hearts, Ayush and Ishani part ways for the sake of their baby.

=== 6 months later ===
Ishani gives birth to baby boy in an abandoned Shiva Temple. The Singha Roys and Akhilesh come to see the newborn and affectionately call him "Gopal". Maya tries to kill Gopal several times, but in vain. Maya creates a "Vetaal-Mritkee Chakra", a cursed zone where anyone who dies inside it becomes a "Vetaal-Mritkee" (zombie). Maya's unwittingly risks her life, the Mritkees attack and overpower her. Ishani and Ayush manage to escape from the Vetaal Mritkees.

Maya is shocked when she sees Gopal’s power. While returning home with Ishani and her newborn baby Gopal, the Jamini Daini attacks Riddhi, causing the Singha Roys suspect Riddhi's odd behaviour. Tina later discovers that she herself is a Jamini Daini. She attaches Maya's plait to Debashree's plait, turning Debashree into a Daini without her realizing it.

=== Few Days Later ===
Debashree starts turning more and more evil by the day. She becomes fond of heavy jewellery and things that a Daini appreciates. Ishani grows suspicious about Debashree's changed behaviour and finds out that she has become a Diani. Debashree successfully converts Ishani into a Dayaan, but the Diani's power cannot overpower the divine powers within her. Ishani succeeds in convincing Debashree about the kindness within her. Debashree removes her daini plait and throws it into the same river where Maya's ashes were thrown before.

However, Maya is revived & threatened to be taken back to Kohra-Lohk, the graveyard of all evil powers. She realises that only a Doibik can save her. Maya blackmails Ishani into helping her in return for Gopal’s safety. Afraid, Ishani agrees to help her to protect Gopal. Kuheli, the queen of Kohra-Lohk poisons the Singhas and upon realising her mistake, she gives the Kusharani's dagger to Ayush which has the power to push a person back to their past life. Ayush stabs his family and himself, but later all the family members are revived by Devi-Maa. Finally, all members of the family reunite happily.

== Cast ==
=== Main ===
- Diya Mukherjee as Ishani Chowdhury Singha Roy – Doibik; Akhilesh and Shivani's elder daughter; Indu's sister; Ayush's wife; Gopal's mother.
- John Bhattacharya as Ayush Singha Roy – Daanush; Maya and Dev's son; Biswarup and Debashree's adopted son; Anu's brother; Disha and Riddhi's cousin; Ishani's husband; Gopal's father.
- Sampurna Lahiri as Maya Singha Roy – 250-year-old most powerful daini; Debashree's half-sister; Dev's wife and murderer; Ayush and Anu's mother; Gopal's grandmother. (Dead)

=== Recurring ===
- Antara Nandy as Debashree Singha Roy – Maya's half-sister; Biswarup's wife; Ayush and Anu's adoptive mother; Gopal's adoptive grandmother.
- Debdut Ghosh as Biswarup Singha Roy – Dev and Abhi's brother; Debashree's husband; Ayush and Anu's adoptive father; Gopal's adoptive grandfather.
- Royshreemaa Das as Tina Singha Roy – Dola's daughter; Maya's puppet; Sorpini and Ayush's ex-wife. (Dead)
- Sanchari Mondal as Jaamini – Daini; Tina's imposter (Dead)
- Dhrubojyoti Sarkar as Dev Singha Roy – Biswarup and Abhi's brother; Maya's husband; Ayush and Anu's father; Gopal's grandfather. (Dead)
- Fahim Mirza as ACP Abhirup "Abhi" Singha Roy – Biswarup and Dev's brother; Swati's husband; Disha and Ridhhi's father.
- Shampa Banerjee as Swati Singha Roy – Abhi's wife; Disha and Riddhi's mother.
- Somashri Bhattacharya / Moumi Dutta as Ananya "Anu" Singha Roy – Maya and Dev's daughter; Biswarup and Debashree's adopted daughter; Ayush's sister; Disha and Riddhi's cousin.
- Debarshi Banerjee as Riddhi Singha Roy – Abhi and Swati's son; Disha's brother; Ayush and Anu's cousin.
- Nishantika Das as Disha Singha Roy – Abhi and Swati's daughter; Riddhi's sister; Ayush and Anu's cousin.
- Sagnik Chatterjee as Professor Akhilesh Chowdhury – A Reebaboongshi; Shivani's husband; Ishani and Indu's father; Gopal's grandfather.
- Sujata Dawn as Shivani Chowdhury – A Reebaboongshi; Akhilesh's wife; Ishani and Indu's mother; Gopal's grandmother; Maya's best friend turned enemy. (Dead)
- Rupsha Mondal as Indrani "Indu" Chowdhury – A Reebaboongshi; Akhilesh and Shivani's younger daughter; Ishani's sister.
- Tanuka Chatterjee as Guru Maa – A visually challenged priestess; Bhaskar's mother; Ishaani and Indu's foster mother.
- Satyam Bhattacharya / Suhotra Mukherjee as Bhaskar Chatterjee – Guru Maa's son; Ishani's ex-fiancé.
- Shirsha Guha Thakurta as Rimjhim – Maya's rival; Ayush's love interest. (Dead)
- Animesh Bhaduri as Gurudeb – Singha Roy's family priest.
- Sudipta Banerjee as Dola Chatterjee – Two headed daini; Maya's childhood friend and enemy; Tina's mother. (Dead)
