= Yehh Jadu Hai Jinn Ka! =

Indian fantasy television series

- Genre: Drama; Thriller; Romance
- Developed by: Gul Khan
- Written by: Mrinal Jha; Divy Nidhi Sharma (Dialogues, Shayari & Lyrics); Aparajita Sharma (Dialogues)
- Screenplay by: Shubham Sharma; Bhavya Balantrapu; Aditi Powar
- Story by: Mrinal Jha
- Directed by: Atif Khan
- Creative director: Muskan Bajaj
- Starring: Vikram Singh Chauhan; Aditi Sharma
- Theme music composer: Tapas Relia
- Opening theme: Kahaani Humari Fasana Humara
- Composer: Sanjeev Shrivastav
- Country of origin: India
- Original language: Hindi
- No. of seasons: 2
- No. of episodes: 218

Production
- Producers: Gul Khan; Karishma Jain
- Production location: India
- Cinematography: Nidhin Valard
- Animator: Flying Toads Entertainment Pvt. Ltd
- Editor: Shashank H.Singh
- Camera setup: Multi camera
- Running time: 20-24 minutes
- Production company: 4 Lions Films

Original release
- Network: Star Plus
- Release: 14 October 2019 – 14 November 2020

Yehh Jaadu Hai Jinn Ka! (transl.This Magic Is of the Jinn!) (international title: A Magical Love Story) is an Indian fantasy drama television series that aired from 14 October 2019 to 14 November 2020 on Star Plus. Produced by Gul Khan and Karishma Jain, it starred Vikram Singh Chauhan and Aditi Sharma as leads.

== Plot ==
Aman Khan and Roshni Ahmed are described to be opposites but have the same goal. Their lives are connected through fate and magic.

Aman Khan is a Nawab who is cursed by the Dark Shadow of a Djinn. Roshni, the daughter of a Tawaif, is an Ayaana (A girl with the heart of an angel). Aman's family wants him to marry an Ayaana, they arrange his marriage with a girl named Ada, whom they are mistaken to be an Ayaana. During every test that they conduct to find out who is Ayaana, Roshni and Ada are both present at the same place. This leads to a case of mistaken identities making Ada the Ayaana who passes the tests when, in reality, it is Roshni who did. Parveen's (Aman's mother) life falls in danger because of the Jinn's magic and can be protected only if Aman marries an Ayaana thus revealing that Ada is not an Ayaana. Salma (Roshni's adoptive mother) pretends to be sick, forcing Roshni to marry Aman for money. Aman misunderstands Roshni to be a woman with ill intentions who will do anything for money. He detests her and gives her a cheque for marrying him. Aman and Roshni marry.

Roshni feels a connection with Aman but is hurt by his rude behaviour towards her owing to the misunderstanding that occurred. Later she falls in love with Aman, but he continues to dislike and insult her. Because of some misconceptions, Aman throws her out of his house and his life. Aman's brother, Kabir Khan, makes his entry. He tries to kill Aman, but to save Aman, Roshni takes the arrows herself and dies. Aman realizes his deep love for Roshni after her death and is left heartbroken and guilty for always misunderstanding her.

Kabir brings Roshni back to life but keeps her under his control, aiming to separate her from Aman. He erases all her memories with Aman. Kabir's hold on Roshni is destroyed when Aman stabs her with a magical dagger. Then Roshni regains her memory. Parveen is revealed to be evil who wants to use her sons to become the queen of jinns. Parveen kills Kabir but cannot kill Aman. Aman unintentionally touches a mighty sword and becomes 'Jinnat ka Badshah', the new most potent in the dark world. Aman and Roshni enjoy their life together.

Aliya, Aman's ex-girlfriend, returns with a baby and tries to separate Aman and Roshni. The baby is revealed to be Kabir's, and Aliya is revealed to be an Evil ayaana. Parveen tries to sacrifice the baby to regain her lost powers, but Aman saves the child with Roshni's help. Roshni tries to expose Aliya but fails. Aliya attacks Parveen resulting in Parveen going into a coma. Aman, believing it is Roshni's fault throw her out of the house.

=== 1 year later ===
Roshni opens a bakery while Aman is worried about Parveen's decreased health conditions. Despite their differences, Aman and Roshni again become close. Kabir returns. Aman gets stabbed while saving Roshni and becomes physically and emotionally weak. His genuine feelings for Roshni come out. In that intoxicated form only, they consummate their marriage after a year. Kabir makes Aman and Roshni break the Laal Chand, which annoys the Red Moon Princess, Laila. Laila had a twin sister Chandni who is good. Kabir joins hands with Laila and helps her seek revenge against Aman and Roshni. Chandni helps Aman by giving clues that Roshni is pregnant with twins which Roshni don't know. Chandni saves Aman's family from Laila's evil intentions. Later, Roshni stabs Laila to death. Before dying, Laila curses Roshni that she will die before the next moonrise. Aman races against time and succeeds in saving Roshni but temporarily.

=== (Season 2) ===
The red moon soldier attacks Roshni, and she loses one of her unborn child and Aman. But the family thinks that the loss is of two babies. However, Roshni fights destiny and brings back Aman. She meets Aman's maternal cousin, Rehan Khan, a jinn, to help her in this war. After a failed attempt, she strikes a deal with Kala Jinn to give her firstborn child instead of Aman's life. Roshni hides this from Aman and the family till she finds a solution. Soon Roshni find that she is pregnant with twins and one baby is alive and another baby dies in a red moon soldier attack.

Here Rubina's niece Shayari appears. While Rehan, Aman's maternal cousin, finds trouble being targeted by a Jinn Shikari, unaware that it was his girlfriend, Natasha. He suspected Shayari, who was later revealed to be another Jinn Shikari but not a danger for Rehan. Rehan wanted to find his brother and decided to get engaged with Natasha. He accidentally gets engaged with Shayari, who became furious after this but agreed to help them after Aman requested her. To save her child, Roshni decided to surrogate it to a girl with Rubina, But Roshni changes her decision as Kala Jinn threatens her to kill Aman if she breaks her promise. Aman captures Kala Jinn for their child's safety. Roshni helps Aman do the task but later releases Kala Jinn from captivity to keep her promise. Aman finds this out and tricks Roshni to make her reveal the truth. After learning the truth, Aman was heartbroken. Roshni leaves Junaid Manzil to make him feel better, but he brings Roshni back.

Meanwhile, Rehan takes an arrow on his chest to save Shayari, saving her life from the deadly attack. Later on, Shayari's truth is revealed, and a furious Rehan breaks their engagement.

Ayana, the ancient warrior princess, comes to help Roshni save her child. She helps them trick Kala Jinn by giving a fake child while Roshni safely delivers her baby in the Ayanaa Corner. After learning this, Kala Jinn imprisoned Roshni and Armaan (Aman and Roshni's baby) in a cave. Aman was successful in saving Roshni and Armaan, but Kala Jinn found out. Aman agreed to Kala Jinn that they would find his actual name to save Armaan. Kala Jinn told them they could find his name after completing the three tasks.

Rehan and Shayari also decide to help the khans and go on a mission to find Kaala Jinn's name. Kaala Jinn, to defeat the Khans, sends Aman and Roshni's first child (who was killed by the red moon's arrow) as the third challenge. However, the Khans win over the baby's spirit (lovingly called baby rooh) with their unconditional love for it. After receiving the three clues, Aman and Roshni find the name when Rehan and Shayari discovered that whoever takes Kala Jinn's name dies immediately. Kala Jinn comes to the mansion and asks them to tell them his name. Roshni bursts out his name to save her child, shocking everyone, but her first child's spirit held her. Kala Jinn does not accept failure and challenges them to fight him. It is revealed that Armaan, being the son of Jinnad Ke Badshah and Ayaana, will end Kaala Jinn. Roshni, Aman, Rehan, and Shayari go on a quest to end Kala Jinn, and Armaan finally kills the danger that troubled his family for many years. This quest brought Rehan and Shayari closer and reinforced their trust in each other.

Later, after several other incidents, it is revealed that Rubina "Tabeezi", was an Ayaana earlier and wants her Angelic-heart back from Roshni and that Natasha was involved with her. It is also revealed that Roshni is Rubina's elder brother, Mansoor Ahmed Choudhary's daughter, and is the original owner of Junaid Manzil and Rubina's niece.

Roshni was devastated to learn this and promised to give her heart to Rubina but made her promise that she wouldn't hurt her family before The Night of the Golden Sun. But Rubina continued trying to hurt her and her family. Meanwhile, Rehan and Shayari try to help the family by searching for the Ilm-e-Jinn book, which would solve their doubts. To get answers, Rehan has to concentrate on his doubts, but all he can concentrate is on Shayari. This makes Rehan realize that he's madly in love with her. On the other hand, Roshni decides not to give her heart to Rubina and refuses to keep her promise, making Rubina furious.

Roshni again becomes pregnant. On the other hand, Rehan and Shayari are kidnapped and held captive, and Shayari is suffocated. Rehan breaks down on seeing this. Later they manage to remain alive. Rehan is unable to confess his love, but Shayari understands.

On the night of the Golden Sun, Rubina traps the entire Khan family in danger. Rehan and Shayari save them using their powers. Aman and Roshni lose their powers but are protected by Armaan's powers. Finally, with the help of the magical ring given by Roshni's mother's soul to her, they defeat Rubina, and she is taken away by two other Ayaanas from Ayaana Kumbh.

While the Khan family celebrates with joy that now all the problems from their lives are gone, they can live happily. Shayari confesses her feelings for Rehan, and they hug each other. Aman asks Roshni where the angelic heart went. Roshni asks him not to think about it as now problems are over, and they can lead a simple and happy life forever. The Angelic-heart is revealed to be with Aman and Roshni's child, who is inside her womb.

== Cast ==
=== Main ===
- Vikram Singh Chauhan as Aman Junaid Khan: Jinnat ka Baadshah; Parveen and Junaid's son; Rubina's step son; Kabir's twin brother, Sara and Saima's elder brother; Farah's half-brother; Aaliya's ex fiancee; Roshni's husband; Armaan and Ayan's father (2019–2020)
  - Aayan Aman Khan: Aman and Roshni's son; Armaan's twin brother (2020)
    - Shaurya Shah as Child Aman Khan (2019; 2020)
- Aditi Sharma as Roshni Aman Khan: An Ayaana; Mansoor's daughter; Salma's adopted daughter; Aman's wife; Armaan and Ayan's mother (2019–2020)

=== Recurring ===
- Smita Bansal as Parveen Khan: Former Sifrati Jinn; Nasreen's sister; Junaid's first wife; Kabir, Aman, Sara and Saima's mother; Farah's step mother; Aamir, Armaan and Ayan's grandmother (2019–2020)
- Sushant Singh as Junaid Khan: Anjum's son; Baby's brother; Parveen and Rubina's husband; Kabir, Aman, Sara, Saima and Farah's father; Aamir, Armaan and Ayan's grandfather (2019–2020)
- Garima Vikrant Singh as Salma Janesaar: A Tawaif; Roshni's adoptive mother (2019–2020)
- Jaswinder Gardner as Rubina Khan "Tabeezi": An ex-Ayaana; Mansoor's sister; Junaid's second wife; Farah's mother; Kabir, Aman, Sara and Saima's step-mother (2019–2020)
- Arhaan Behll as Kabir Khan: Sifriti Jinn; later Zehraal; Parveen and Junaid's son; Aman's twin brother; Sara and Saima's elder brother; Farah's half-brother; Aliya's husband; Aamir's father (2019–2020)
- Shehzada Dhami as Rehan Khan: Nasreen's elder son; Farhan and Mahira's brother; Shayari's love interest (2020)
- Shruti Sharma as Shayari Choudhary: Rehan's love interest and secretary (2020)
- Vaibhavi Kapoor as Sara Khan: Parveen and Junaid's daughter; Kabir and Aman's younger sister; Saima's twin sister; Farah's half-sister (2019–2020)
- Gouri Agarwal as Saima Khan: Parveen and Junaid's daughter; Kabir and Aman's younger sister; Sara's twin sister; Farah's half-sister; Aftab's wife (2019–2020)
- Saloni Daini as Farah Khan: Rubina and Junaid's daughter; Praveen's step daughter; Kabir, Aman, Sara and Saima's half-sister (2019–2020)
- Richa Bhattacharya as Anjum Khan: Junaid and Baby's mother; Kabir, Aman, Sara, Saima, Imran and Farah's grandmother; Aamir, Armaan and Ayan's great-grandmother (2019–2020)
- Seema Azmi as Baby Khan: Anjum's daughter; Junaid's sister; Imran's mother (2019–2020)
- Ayansh Mishra as Mr. Chotu: Soha's son; Khan family's adopted son (2019–2020)
- Aamir S Khan as Imran: Baby's son (2020)
- Ashita Dhawan as Nasreen Khan: Sifrati Jinn; Parveen's sister; Rehan, Farhan and Mahira's mother (2020)
- Prabhat Choudhary as Farhan Khan: Nasreen's younger son; Rehan and Mahira's brother (2020)
- Solanki Sharma as Mahira Khan: Nasreen's daughter; Rehan and Farhan's sister (2020)
- Himani Sahani as Natasha: Jinn Shikari; Rehan's evil girlfriend (2020)
- Sanjana Singh as Ada Rizvi: Aman's former fiancée (2019)
- Massheuddin Qureshi as Mr. Rizvi: Ada's father (2019)
- Unknown as Mrs. Rizvi: Ada's mother (2019)
- Rupesh Kataria as Sameer: Roshni's former fiancé; Huma's husband (2019)
- Surbhi Jyoti as
  - Laila: Chandni's twin sister; Red Moon Princess (2020)
  - Chandni: Laila's twin sister; Red Moon Princess (2020)
- Rajshri Rani as Huma: Sameer's wife (2019)
- Sreejita De as Aliya Khan: Haiwana; Aman's ex-girlfriend; Kabir's wife; Aamir's mother (2020)
- Krishvi Bhanushali as Aamir Khan: Aliya and Kabir's son (2020)
- Saloni Chauhan as Raakh Jinn: Kabir's helper (2019)
- Zubeida Verma as ChunBun: Spider Jinn (2020)
- Pranav Kumar as Jaadugar Jinn: A magician (2020)
- Shefali Mahida as Aman's sword (2020)
- Shraddha Tiwari as Shola Jinn: A dragon (2020)
- Simran Arora as Jalpari Jinn (2020)
- Subhan Khan as Jhumru: laal Jinn (2020)
- Ankita Mayank Sharma as Mrs. Choudhary; Mansoor's wife; Roshni's mother; Aayana and Armaan's maternal grandmother (2020)

== Production ==
=== Development ===
The show was launched at Pataudi Palace, becoming the first television show to be launched at the Pataudi Palace. It initially was titled as Raaz Mahal but later changed its title to Yehh Jadu Hai Jinn Ka. It was originally planned to be a weekend show. However, it was later aired through weekdays.

Saloni Daini, who played Farah Khan narrated the first few episodes and was the voiceover artist for the promos of the series. In September 2020, the series received extension till December 2020 but went off air in November 2020 due to low ratings.

=== Casting ===
Actress Aditi Sharma was selected to play Roshni Ahmed's character. Leenesh Mattoo was first approached to play Aman Junaid Khan opposite Sharma, but was replaced by Vikram Singh Chauhan.

In December 2019, Arhaan Behll joined the cast as Kabir Junaid Khan. In March 2020, Surbhi Jyoti was cast as the Red moon princess Laila/Chandni for few episodes cameo. In June 2020, Shruti Sharma and Shehzada Dhami were cast as Shayari Choudhary and Rehan Ahmed Khan, respectively.

After the shootings of television shows resumed after lockdown in late June 2020, several actors of the show such as - Smita Bansal, Arhaan Behll, Saloni Daini, Aamir Salim Khan and child actor Ayansh Mishra had to exit the show as limited crew and cast members were allowed on shootings as per government guidelines.

=== Broadcast ===
The production and airing of the show was halted indefinitely in late March 2020 due to the COVID-19 outbreak in India. Because of the outbreak, the filming of television series and films was halted on 19 March 2020 and expected to resume on 1 April 2020 but could not and the series was last broadcast on 27 March 2020 when the remaining episodes were aired. The filming of the series resumed after more than three months in early July and the broadcast resumed on 27 July 2020.

=== Cancellation ===
After the ratings dropped, post the shootings and broadcasting of television shows resumed in India during July 2020 after COVID-19 lockdown, the producer decided to off-air the show in November 2020 cancelling its extension.

== Soundtrack ==
Yehh Jadu Hai Jinn Ka Original Sound Track

Soundtrack album by Sanjeev Srivastava
- Released: 29 November 2019
- Genre: Soundtrack
- Length: 17:05
- Language: Hindi
- Label: Star India
- Producer: Gul Khan

Yehh Jadu Hai Jinn Ka 's soundtrack is written by Divy Nidhi Sharma and composed by Sanjeev Srivastava. "Kahani Hamari Fasana Hamara", the show's theme song is sung by Pamela Jain and Bhaven Dhanak.

Yehh Jadu Hai Jinn Ka: Tracklisting
No.	Title	Artist	Length
1.	"Kahani Hamari Fasana Hamara" (Male)	Bhaven Dhanak	5:03
2.	"Kahani Hamari Fasana Hamara" (Female)	Pamela Jain	5:03
3.	"Kahani Hamari Fasana Hamara" (Duet)	Bhaven Dhanak; Pamela Jain	3:24
4.	"Kahani Hamari Fasana Hamara" (Sad Version)	Bhaven Dhanak; Pamela Jain	3:21
