= Ankit Raj =

Indian television actor

- Occupations: Model, Actor
- Years active: 2011–present

Ankit Raj is an Indian television and film actor and model. He has played a variety of characters in different television shows like Qubool Hai, Ishqbaaaz and Laado 2 – Veerpur Ki Mardaani.

== Career ==
Raj has made his footprints in the fashion world by walking for leading designers such as Manish Malhotra, Rohit Bal, Troy Costa, Wendell Rodricks, Karan Johar, Varun Bahl, and Tarun Tahiliani to name a few. He has been the pool model for Van Heusen for two seasons and has been on the cover of Wills Fashion magazine 2009. Colotmate, Sprite, Honda Jazz, Yamaha FZ, Peter England, Reebok, World player shirts, Kaiser Josh are some of the brands that Raj have been associated with in his fashion career. In 2014, he played the role of Goldie in the film Karle Pyaar Karle. Taran Adarsh of Bollywood Hungama, wrote of his performance "a few fill the bill Aham Sharma and Ankit Ra" Raj was felicitated at the Asia Model Festival 2015 for his contribution to the modelling industry. In 2015, Raj made his debut to Indian television with Zee TV's Qubool Hai as Amaad Iqbaal Khan. In 2017, he appeared in the cameo role of Samar in Star Plus's series Ishqbaaaz alongside Additi Gupta.

== Filmography ==
Key
†	Denotes film or TV productions that have not yet been released

=== Television ===
Year	Title	Role	Ref.
2010	Get Gorgeous	Contestant	
2015–2016	Qubool Hai	Amaad Iqbal Khan	
2016	Mastaangi: One Love Story Two Lifetimes	Veer Kapoor	
2017	Khoonkhar	Prince Veer	
2017	Ishqbaaaz	Samarjeet Malhotra	
2017–2018	Laado 2: Veerpur Ki Mardaani	Ranveer Choudhary	
2018	Yeh Pyaar Nahi Toh Kya Hai	Kartik Reddy	
2018–2019	Vish Ya Amrit: Sitara	Samrat Singh	
2019	Main Bhi Ardhangini 2	Adhiraj	
2021	Qubool Hai 2.0	Salmaan Ansari	
2022	Dharm Yoddha Garud	Kaliya Naag	
2024	Qayaamat Se Qayaamat Tak	Vikram "Vicky" Sahariya	

=== Films ===
Year	Title	Role	Notes
2014	Karle Pyaar Karle	Goldie	
2018	Ascharyachakit	Karan	
2023	Pyar Mein Twist †	Gopal	Theatre Play
