= Nehalaxmi Iyer =

Indian television actress (born 1991)

Nehlaxmi Iyer Joshi
- Born: 8 November 1991 (age 34); Mumbai, Maharashtra, India
- Occupations: Actress, Dancer
- Years active: 2000—present
- Known for: Ishqbaaaz; Qubool Hai; Sasural Simar Ka; Dil Boley Oberoi
- Spouse: Rudraysh Joshi (m. 2024)
- Parents: Vinay Hariharan (father); Anjana Vinay (mother)
- Relatives: Sagar Iyer (brother)

Nehlaxmi Iyer is an Indian television actress. She is known for playing the role of Najma Ahmed Khan in Qubool Hai (2012–14) and its reboot Qubool Hai 2.0 (2022) and the parallel role of Saumya Kapoor in Ishqbaaaz (2016–18) and in its spin-off series Dil Boley Oberoi (2017).

== Personal life ==
She is born and brought up in Mumbai.

She married her long term boyfriend Rudraysh Joshii on 26 February 2024 with South Indian and Marathi rituals.

== Career ==
Nehlaxmi Joshi started her acting career at the age of 2 with advertisements. Her first TV show as a child artist was Banegi Apni Baat on Zee TV. After doing numerous roles, She was seen in the role of Najma in Zee TV's Qubool Hai. She played Surbhi in Sasural Simar Ka on Colors.

In 2016, She was cast for the role of Saumya Kapoor, a parallel lead in Star Plus's 2016 drama Ishqbaaaz, and its spin-off Dil Boley Oberoi (2017) opposite Leenesh Mattoo a role she played until 2017.

In 2020, she starred in Zee5's dramedy lockdown special show Bhalla Calling Bhalla playing Neha.

In 2021, she reprised her role as Najma in the Zee 5's Qubool Hai reboot web series.

After a 5 year long hiatus, Iyer was cast in Balaji Digital's YouTube show Ishk Dum aur Idli Rasam, where she played the parallel lead role of Saundhrya Nair. This was a collaboration with her Ishqbaaaz co-star Surbhi Chandna.

== Filmography ==
=== Television ===
Year	Title	Role	Ref (s)
1996–1997	Banegi Apni Baat	N/A	
2009–2010	Na Aana Is Des Laado	Gunja	
2010–2011	Krishnaben Khakhrawala	Divya	
2012	Mujhse Kuchh Kehti... Yeh Khamoshiyaanl	Payal	
2012–2014	Qubool Hai	Najma Ahmed Khan Imran Qureshi	
2014	Sasural Simar Ka	Surbhi Ahuja	
2016–2018	Ishqbaaaz	Saumya Kapoor	
2017	Dil Boley Oberoi	Saumya Kapoor	

=== Web series ===
Year	Title	Role	Network	Ref (s)
2020	Bhalla Calling Bhalla	Neha	ZEE5	
2021	Qubool Hai 2.0	Najma Ahmed Khan	ZEE5	
2026	Ishk Dum Aur Idli Rasam	Saundhrya "Sunny" Nair	YouTube	

== Award and nominations ==
Year	Award	Category	Result
2013	Favorite Behen	Zee Rishtey Awards	Nominated
2017	Award of Excellence	ALL Ladies League	Won
