= Surbhi Jyoti =

Indian television actress

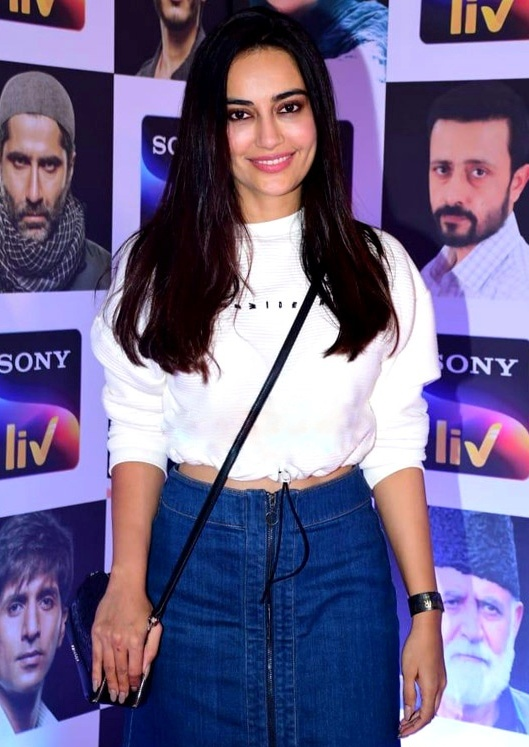
- Jyoti in 2022
- Born: 29 May 1988 (age 38); Jalandhar, Punjab, India
- Occupation: Actress
- Years active: 2010–present
- Known for: Qubool Hai; Naagin 3
- Spouse: Sumit Suri (m. 2024)
- Children: 1

Surbhi Jyoti (pronounced [ˈsuɾbʱi d͡ʒjoːt̪i]; born 29 May 1988) is an Indian actress who mainly works in Hindi television and Punjabi films. She rose to fame after her portrayal of Zoya Farooqui Ahmed Khan in Qubool Hai, for which she received numerous accolades, including ITA Award for GR8! Performer of the Year.

Jyoti received wider attention after portraying a shape-shifting serpent named Praveen Bela Sehgal in Colors TV's supernatural series Naagin 3, for which she received a nomination for Best Actress at Indian Television Academy Awards. In 2021, she made her Hindi film debut with Saurabh Tyagi's comedy-drama Kya Meri Sonam Gupta Bewafa Hai? opposite Jassie Gill.

== Early life ==
Jyoti was born on 29 May 1988 in Jalandhar, Punjab, India. She received her early education from Shiv Jyoti Public School and then graduated from Hans Raj Mahila Maha Vidyalaya in Jalandhar. As a student of Hans Raj Mahila Maha Vidyalaya, she participated in debates and received honours. Jyoti is a graduate with a degree in Economics and a Master's degree in English Literature from Apeejay College of Fine Arts.

== Career ==
Jyoti started her career in regional theatre and films. She has also been a radio jockey. She worked in Punjabi language films Ik Kudi Punjab Di, Raula Pai Gaya and Munde Patiala De as well as the Punjabi television series Akiyaan To Door Jayen Na and Kach Diyan Wanga.

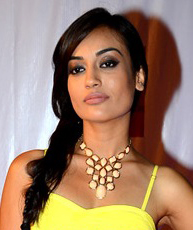
Jyoti in 2015

At the end of 2012, Jyoti was cast in the television show Qubool Hai, which was produced by 4 Lions Films and was telecasted on Zee TV. She played the role of Zoya Farooqui. For the portrayal of the character, she won the award for GR8! Performer of the Year—Female at the Indian Television Academy Awards and Best Début Actress at the Zee Gold Awards 2013. She also won the Best Jodi Award with Karan Singh Grover. In 2014, Qubool Hai underwent a reboot, in which she played a double role of Sanam and Seher.

In 2015, she hosted three seasons of the love drama Pyaar Tune Kya Kiya opposite Meiyang Chang. At the 2015 Zee Gold Awards, Karanvir Bohra and Jyoti were given the Best Onscreen Jodi Award. In 2015, Qubool Hai introduced a 25-year leap, after which she played Mahira, her fifth role in the show. Qubool Hai ended in January 2016. In 2016, she hosted a travel-based web show Desi Explorers Taiwan, alongside many other television actors. In 2016, she joined 4 Lions Films' show Ishqbaaaz opposite Shaleen Malhotra, in a cameo as Mallika Kabeer Choudhary, a business women and architect. In September 2016, she hosted another travel show instalment Desi Explorers Yas Island.

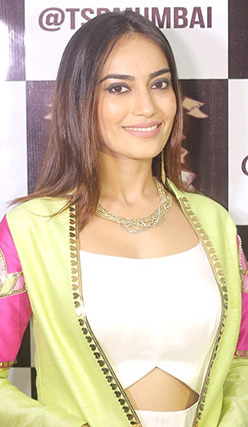
Jyoti in 2017

In 2017, she featured in 4 Lions Films' web show Tanhaiyan opposite Barun Sobti, as Meera Kapoor, a non-judgmental and emotionally vulnerable fashion designer. All episodes of the web series were released on Hotstar on 14 February 2017. In 2017, she starred in Star Plus's psychological thriller show Koi Laut Ke Aaya Hai as Geetanjali Singh Shekhari, a girl from a royal family. She was paired opposite Shoaib Ibrahim, and the cast included actors Sharad Kelkar, Sreejita De and Shaleen Malhotra. The show ended on 18 June 2017.

In June 2018, Jyoti portrayed Bela Sehgal in Balaji Telefilms show Naagin 3 as the main female lead. The show, which aired on Colors TV, received high TRP's and ended in May 2019. In 2020, she appeared in Yeh Jaadu Hai Jinn Ka.

In 2020, Jyoti featured in the music video for "Aaj Bhi" opposite actor Ali Fazal. The same year, she featured in another music video for the song "Judaiyaan", opposite Darshan Raval.

In March 2021, she made her comeback in the digital space with the web series Qubool Hai 2.0, which was a reboot version of her popular Zee TV show Qubool Hai. She worked alongside actor Karan Singh Grover, marking their second collaboration after eight years, and reprising their respective roles as Zoya and Asad.

In 2021, Jyoti planned her Bollywood debut with Jassie Gill in Kya Meri Sonam Gupta Bewafa Hai?

In 2024, she starred opposite Gurnam Bhullar in Punjabi movie Khadari where she played as Amrit, a Kho Kho team captain.

== Personal life ==
Jyoti married her long time boyfriend, actor Sumit Suri on 27 October 2024 in a traditional Hindu wedding ceremony at the Jim Corbett Resorts, Uttarakhand. The couple had their first child, a girl, on 13 June 2026.

== Media image ==
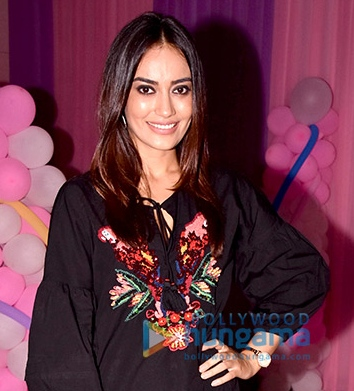
Jyoti at an event in 2017

Jyoti was placed 3rd in Rediff's Top 10 Television Actresses list of 2014. In Times' Most Desirable Women on TV, she was placed 6th in 2018 and 7th in 2020. In UK-based newspaper Eastern Eye's list of 50 Sexiest Asian Women, she ranked 16th in 2014 and 17th in 2015. Jyoti is also one of the most-followed Indian television actresses in Instagram.

== Filmography ==
=== Films ===
Year	Title	Role	Language	Ref.
2010	Ik Kudi Punjab Di	Gurmeet Kaur	Punjabi	
2012	Raula Pai Gaya	Reet	Punjabi	
2012	Munde Patiala De	Priyanka	Punjabi	
2021	Kya Meri Sonam Gupta Bewafa Hai?	Sonam Gupta	Hindi	
2024	Khadari	Amrit	Punjabi	

=== Television ===
Year	Title	Role	Ref.
2010	Akiyaan To Door Jayen Na	Sona	
2011–2012	Kach Diyan Wanga	Preet Sehgal	
2012–2016	Qubool Hai	Zoya Farooqui / Sanam Ahmed Khan / Seher Ahmed Khan / Mahira Akhtar	
2014–2015	Pyaar Tune Kya Kiya	Host	
2016	Ishqbaaaz	Mallika Kabir Choudhary	
2017	Koi Laut Ke Aaya Hai	Geetanjali Singh Shekhari	
2017	Love Aur Dhokha	Host	
2018–2019	Naagin 3	Bela Sehgal / Shravani Sippy	

==== Special appearances ====
Year	Title	Role	Ref.
2013	Sapne Suhane Ladakpan Ke	Zoya Farooqui	
2013	Punar Vivaah - Zindagi Milegi Dobara	Zoya Farooqui	
2013	Pavitra Rishta	Zoya Farooqui	
2013	Badalte Rishton Ki Dastaan	Zoya Farooqui	
2013	Punar Vivah - Ek Nayi Umeed	Zoya Farooqui	
2013	Connected Hum Tum	Zoya Farooqui	
2013	Khelti Hai Zindagi Aankh Micholi	Zoya Farooqui	
2013	India's Best Dramebaaz	Herself	
2014	Dil Se Naachein Indiawaale	Herself	
2015	Kumkum Bhagya	Zoya Farooqui	
2016	Kumkum Bhagya	Zoya Farooqui	
2016	Tashan-e-Ishq	Zoya Farooqui	
2016	Jamai Raja	Zoya Farooqui	
2016	Box Cricket League 2	Herself	
2016	Box Cricket League Punjab	Herself	
2016	Fear Factor: Khatron Ke Khiladi 7	Herself	
2016	Comedy Nights Bachao	Herself	
2016	Comedy Nights Live	Herself	
2017	Dev	Advocate Fatima Hydari	
2017	Comedy Dangal	Herself	
2018	Bigg Boss 12	Herself	
2018	MTV Ace of Space 1	Herself	
2019	Kitchen Champion 5	Herself	
2019	Khatra Khatra Khatra	Herself	
2019	Dance Deewane 2	Herself	
2019	MTV Ace of Space 2	Herself	
2019	Bigg Boss 13	Herself	
2019	Kumkum Bhagya	Herself	
2019	Box Cricket League 4	Herself	
2020	MasterChef India 6	Herself	
2020	Yehh Jadu Hai Jinn Ka!	Laila	
2020	Yehh Jadu Hai Jinn Ka!	Chandni	
2020	Naagin 5	Naagrani Bela	
2020	Bigg Boss 14	Herself	
2021	Bigg Boss 15	Herself	

=== Web series ===
Year	Title	Role	Ref.
2016	Desi Explorers Taiwan	Contestant	
2016	Desi Explorers Yas Island	Contestant	
2017	Tanhaiyan	Meera Kapoor	
2021	Qubool Hai 2.0	Zoya Farooqui	
2023	Partners	Ritika	
2024	Gunaah	Tara	

=== Music videos ===
Year	Title	Singer(s)	Ref.
2018	"Haanji"	Rabbit Sack, K9 and Shrooodi	
2020	"Aaj Bhi"	Vishal Mishra	
2020	"Judaiyaan"	Shreya Ghoshal, Darshan Raval	
2021	"Sakhiyaan"	Simar Sethi	
2021	"Ghana Kasoota"	Rashmeet Kaur, Raftaar	
2021	"Bismillah 2"	Jazim Sharma, Kanwar Grewal	
2022	"Ve Tu"	Sunidhi Chauhan	
2022	"Jumme Di Namaaz"	Dhruv Malik	
2022	"Khuda Badal Diya"	Sumit Bhalla	

== Accolades ==
Year	Award	Category	Work	Result	Ref.
2013	Indian Television Academy Awards	GR8! Performer Of The Year (Female)	Qubool Hai	Won	
2013	Indian Television Academy Awards	Best Actress	Qubool Hai	Nominated	
2013	Indian Telly Awards	Fresh New Face Female	Qubool Hai	Nominated	
2013	Indian Telly Awards	Best Onscreen Couple (With Karan Singh Grover)	Qubool Hai	Nominated	
2013	Gold Awards	Best Debut Female	Qubool Hai	Won	
2013	Gold Awards	Best Onscreen Jodi (With Karan Singh Grover)	Qubool Hai	Won	
2015	Gold Awards	Best Onscreen Jodi (With Karanvir Bohra)	Qubool Hai	Won	
2018	Gold Awards	Most Fit Actress	—N/a	Won	
2018	Indian Television Academy Awards	Best Actress (Jury)	Naagin 3	Nominated	
2019	Indian Telly Awards	Indian Telly Award for Best Actress in a Lead Role	Naagin 3	Nominated	
2020	Gold Glam and Style Awards	Best Dressed Actor (Female) TV	—N/a	Won	

== See also ==
- List of Hindi television actresses
- List of Indian television actresses
