= Akhiyaan Toh Door Jayen Naa =

Indian tv series

Akhiyaan Toh Door Jayeen Naa is an Indian Punjabi language TV series broadcast on ETC Punjabi (Zee Punjabi in the United States). The show premiered on 6 September 2010 and lasted for a six-month period, concluding on 30 March 2011. Gurbir Singh Grewal was responsible for writing, producing and directing the episodes. This show was celebrated television actress Surbhi Jyoti's (who is currently the lead of Qubool Hai acting debut after doing over three years of theatre.

== Plot ==
The main story revolves around the lead couple Ravjot, known by her nickname Jot (played by Vandana Singh (actress)), and Sukhjit, better known as Sukhi (played by Vikram Sidhu), who love each other but are not allowed to do so by their families and the plotting of Karnail (Navdeep Kaler), who wants to marry Jot.

Because of a fallout between them, Karnail has sworn to ruin Jot's life by marrying her; while Jot is aware of his intentions and does not want to. But Jot's family do not approve of her lover Sukhi's family status and want to marry her off to Karnail. Sukhi's family does approve of this relationship, but Sukhi is advised to forget Jot because her parents shall not marry her to him.

Karnail's actions fail a plan by Jot's friends Sona (Surbhi Jyoti) and Vijay to help them elope and marry, which later on caused Jot's father to have a heart attack. He also has Sukhi beaten up by goons. On the other hand, his girlfriend of two years, Aman is pregnant, and he wishes to have her aborted. She refuses and her father tries to talk with Karnail's father Wasaka Singh, who also refuses to have his son married to Aman. He instead has her aborted and then later killed when she threatened to reveal everything to Jot's family.

Karnail and Jot now get engaged and meanwhile Sukhi, trying to follow Jot's advice to forget her, also gets engaged to his partner in his new music career, Deep. But Deep also is aware that Sukhi still loves Jot and shall only marry her. Meanwhile, Jot's family keep getting random calls and suggestions from unrelated people not to marry their daughter to Karnail, whose father brushes it off saying that they are jealous.

== Cast ==
- Vandana Singh (actress)-Ravjot (Jot)
- Vikram Sidhu-Sukhjit Sidhu (Sukhi)
- Navdeep Kaler-Karnail
- Surbhi Jyoti-Sona (Jot's Best Friend)
- Nancy Mittal (Jot's Friend)
- Kavya Singh-Deep
- Gurpreet Singh-Vijay (Sukhi's Best Friend)
- Sanjeev Mohammed-Jagtar
- Surinder Singh Bath-Makhan Doabia
- Kavita Sharma-Paalo
- Anita Shabdeesh-Raj Kaur (Jot's Mother)
- Malkeet Rauni-Sajjan Singh (Jot's father)
- Parminder Gill Barnala-(Sukhi's Tayi)
- Tarsinder Singh Soni-Wasaka Singh (Karnail's father)
- Anita Meet-Satnam Kaur (Karnail's mother)
- Ikktar Singh-Bhaiyya from UP (Wasakha's Employee)
- Rajesh Sharma-Bapu Ji (Karnail's Grandfather)
- Charan Saini-Charan (dead, Sukhi's cousin)
- Ajay Kumar-Sandhu
- Vikas Dhawan - lawyer
- Roopi Maan- doctor
