= Dil Boley Oberoi =

Indian television series

- Genre: Romance; Drama
- Written by: Harneet Singh; Mrinal Jha; Abhijit Sinha; Franky Jr.; Divy Nidhi Sharma (Dialogue); Aparajita Sharma (Dialogue)
- Directed by: Atif Khan
- Starring: Shrenu Parikh; Kunal Jaisingh
- Opening theme: "O Saathiya" by Pamela Jain
- Composers: Sanjeev Srivastava & Raju Singh
- Country of origin: India
- Original language: Hindi
- No. of seasons: 1
- No. of episodes: 111

Production
- Producers: Gul Khan; Karishma Jain; Nishikant Negi
- Cinematography: Rajan Singh
- Camera setup: Multi-camera
- Running time: 21 minutes
- Production company: 4 Lions Films

Original release
- Network: StarPlus
- Release: 13 February – 7 July 2017

Related
- Ishqbaaaz

Dil Boley Oberoi (transl. The heart says Oberoi) is an Indian Hindi-language romantic drama television series that premiered from 13 February 2017 to 7 July 2017 on StarPlus and streamed digitally on Disney+ Hotstar. A spin-off to Ishqbaaaz, it is the first spin-off series on Indian television. Produced by 4 Lions Films, the series starred Shrenu Parikh and Kunal Jaisingh.

== Plot ==
=== Omkara-Gauri "Rikara" love story ===
Circumstances forced Omkara Singh Oberoi to despise the idea of love and made him distant from the very relationships he once used to cherish, because of traumatic past experiences; due to his father, Tej's affair with his secretary, Svetlana, and the betrayal of Om's mother, Jhanvi and due to his experience of being fooled easily by women who hurt his emotions. Then, Gauri Kumari Sharma enters his life, whom he looks down upon as an opportunistic, greedy, and characterless girl while in reality, Gauri is a caring girl who values relationships and is devoted to Lord Shiva. Under unforeseen circumstances, both get married; but due to uncleared misunderstandings between them, Omkara develops a deep hatred for Gauri and leaves her right after marriage, subsequently, Gauri, in Chulbul's disguise enters Omkara's home - the Oberoi Mansion and during her time as domestic help there, she grows very close to him and also plays an active role in making Omkara's mission to expose Svetlana and to get rid of her from their lives, a success, meanwhile, Kaali Thakur, the local landowner and don of Bareilly returns to Gauri's life seeking revenge as Gauri had left him at the altar. Kaali Thakur and Svetlana team up, and manipulate Tej against Jhanvi and Omkara. However, Gauri (as Chulbul) with help from Rudra and Bua Maa (Dolly Oberoi) saves the da

After finally getting rid of Svetlana and Kaali, Gauri has to face Omkara's wrath as he gets to know her true identity, despite Omkara wanting to throw Gauri out of his life, Gauri still stands by his side, sacrificing her self-pride, to protect Omkara's life from Bua Maa (his aunt) whose sweet gestures were all pretended as she seeks vengeance for her son, Ratan's accidental death when he was a child and was trying to save Om from drowning. Gauri exposes Bua Maa. Gauri decides to leave Omkara who by now has developed a soft corner for Gauri and learning from his previous mistakes; decides to give their relationship another chance. This marks the end of Dil Boley Oberoi, and Omkara and Gauri's story continued in Ishqbaaaz, where they have to face more hurdles; due to misunderstandings and mistrust in their relationship before finally realizing their feelings for each other.

=== Rudra-Bhavya "RuVya" love story ===
Dil Boley Oberoi also marks the continuation of Rudra and Saumya's relationship, initially seen in Ishqbaaaz, where it was seen that Rudra's antics and his arrogance and ego towards Saumya had already put a dent in their relationship. Despite Saumya's repeated efforts to save their drowning relationship, Rudra (wrongfully) holds her responsible for the growing tension between his father, Tej, and his older brother, Omkara, and for the other problems of his family, leaving Saumya devastated. Their paths cross again when they are taking the same flight to a mutual friend's engagement. The flight's hijacking leads Saumya and Rudra to work together to save the plane from crashing, but their differences remain and Saumya realizes that it is high time they ended things. She visits him for the last time and tells him that they are better off as friends. She then leaves for Australia to pursue higher studies after parting on good terms with Rudra. But she returns to the Oberoi Mansion and is later discovered to be evil. The life story of Rudra then takes a turn when he meets Bhavya Pratap Rathore a police officer who came on a secret mission. While Rudra takes interest in Bhavya she was planning to use Rudra as her defender but eventually both started having feelings for each other. But the identity of Bhavya to be a police officer was not revealed to Rudra yet and according to him Bhavya was a shy, sweet, belonging to a low thinking society but as they started their mission, and faced many hurdles. Eventually, Bhavya's identity was revealed which leaves Rudra shattered and started showing his anger and sadness with Bhavya.

The rest of their story is continued in ishqbaaz.

== Cast ==
=== Main ===
- Shrenu Parikh as Gauri Trivedi Singh Oberoi - Harshvardhan's younger daughter; Anika's younger sister; Omkara's wife
- Kunal Jaisingh as Omkara "Om" Singh Oberoi - Tej and Jhanvi Oberoi's elder son; Rudra and Priyanka's brother; Gauri's husband
- Leenesh Mattoo as Rudra "Ru" Singh Oberoi - Tej and Jhanvi Oberoi's younger son; Omkara and Priyanka's brother; Saumya's ex-husband; Bhavya's husband
- Nehalaxmi Iyer as Saumya Kapoor - Rudra's ex-wife; Svetlana and Tia's younger sister
- Mansi Srivastava as ACP Bhavya Pratap Rathore Singh Oberoi - Rudra's wife

=== Recurring ===
- Nakuul Mehta as Shivaay Singh Oberoi - Pinky and Shakti's son; Annika's husband
- Surbhi Chandna as Annika Trivedi Singh Oberoi - Harshvardhan's elder daughter; Gauri's sister; Sahil's foster sister; Shivaay's wife
- Reyhna Malhotra as Svetlana Kapoor - Tia and Saumya's sister; Tej's ex-mistress; Omkara's ex-fiancée; Abhay's ex-wife
- Mahesh Thakur as Tej Singh Oberoi - Kalyani's son; Shakti and Roop's brother; Jhanvi Oberoi's husband; Omkara, Rudra and Priyanka's father
- Mrinal Deshraj as Jhanvi Singh Oberoi - Tej's wife; Omkara, Rudra and Priyanka's mother
- Navnindra Behl as Kalyani Singh Oberoi - Matriarch of Oberoi family; Prithviraj's wife; Tej, Shakti and Roop's mother; Shivaay, Omkara, Rudra, and Priyanka's grandmother
- Sushmita Mukherjee as Dolly Singh Oberoi - Kalyani's sister-in-law; Ratan's mother
- Avinash Mishra as Abhay Singh Oberoi - Shivaay, Omkara, Rudra, and Priyanka's cousin
- Rahul Dev as Kaali Thakur - a landlord and the local don; Jhanvi Thakur's husband
- Subha Rajput as Priyanka Singh Oberoi - Jhanvi Oberoi and Tej's daughter; Omkara and Rudra's sister; Ranveer's wife
- Ayush Anand as Ranveer Singh Randhawa - Priyanka's husband
- Nitin Bhatia as Nandi - Gauri's sworn brother

=== Special appearances ===
- Sara Khan as Mohini - Aditya's ex-girlfriend
- Nidhi Uttam as Jhanvi Thakur - Kali Thakur's wife
- Sehrish Ali as Maya - Svetlana's assistant
- Mrinmai Kolwalkar as Fake Svetlana Kapoor
- Rakesh Srivastav as Mr. Dhurandhar - a court official

== Production ==
On 26 January 2017, the first promo of the show was released. On 5 February 2017, the second promo was released which introduced Shrenu Parikh as Gauri Kumari Sharma.

Speaking about introducing a spin-off of Ishqbaaaz, lead actor Kunal Jaisingh said, "Spin-offs" as a trend has come to India now. It has always been there in the west. "Ishqbaaaz" had three stories running together and just 20 minutes couldn't do justice to all three. That's how the idea of "Dil Boley Oberoi" came. The show came through beautifully. And it was of course amazing to have my own story and see my character grow.”

== Future ==
On 10 July 2017, producer Gul Khan decided to merge Dil Boley Oberoi with Ishqbaaaz. The parent series aired 1 hour long episodes since then.
