= Ishk Dum Aur Idli Rasam =

Hindi romantic television series

- Genre: Drama; Romance
- Created by: Ekta Kapoor; Surbhi Chandna
- Developed by: Ekta Kapoor
- Showrunners: Surbhi Chandna; Karan Sharma
- Written by: Dialogues: Kandarp Shroff; Lyrics: Surbhi Chandna
- Screenplay by: Aashish Tilak
- Story by: Karishmaa Oluchi
- Directed by: Vinod Bika
- Creative directors: Shumaila Khan; Karan Sharma; Tanmay Mohit
- Presented by: Fortune Foods; Goldiee Group
- Starring: Abhishek Kumar; Shiny Doshi
- Theme music composer: Yash Tiwari; Label; Yash Music; Feel Good Originals
- Opening theme: "Kya Isko Hi Kehte Hai Pyaar" by Yashraj Kapil and KavyaKriti
- Ending theme: "Arjun's Sacrifice" by KavyaKriti
- Composers: Kavya Daga; Kriti Daga
- Country of origin: India
- Original language: Hindi
- No. of seasons: 1
- No. of episodes: 30

Production
- Executive producers: Amit Maru; Nitin Burman; Mohit Bhaskar
- Producers: Ekta Kapoor; Shobha Kapoor; Surbhi Chandna; Karan Sharma
- Production location: Mumbai
- Cinematography: Ajaya Behl
- Editors: Shashank H Singh; Prashant Singh
- Camera setup: Multi-camera
- Running time: 19–22 minutes
- Production companies: Balaji Telefilms; Feel Good Studios

Original release
- Network: YouTube
- Release: 11 May – 17 July 2026

Ishk Dum Aur Idli Rasam is an Indian Hindi-language romantic drama series jointly produced by Ekta Kapoor and Shobha Kapoor under the banner of Balaji Telefilms Ltd and Surbhi Chandna and Karan Sharma's Feel Good Studios for Balaji Telefilms entertainment channel. It stars Abhishek Kumar and Shiny Doshi as chefs Arjun Thakur and Meera Nair respectively. The series aired from 11 May to 17 July 2026 on YouTube.

The show revolves around Meera Nair, a chef running her late father's South Indian restaurant, whose world is shaken when Arjun Thakur, a celebrated chef-investor with a modern vision, enters her kitchen, turning rivalry into romance

== Plot ==
Meera Nair, a passionate chef, is desperately trying to save Dakshin Illam, a beloved South Indian restaurant as a legacy left behind by her late father, from closing down forever. Celebrity chef Arjun Thakur enters the picture as a restaurant consultant. However, he secretly harbors an ulterior motive to take over the failing business for his own profit. Their personalities, cooking philosophies, and working styles constantly clash, turning the kitchen into a battlefield. As they spend time rebuilding the restaurant together, Meera and Arjun unexpectedly fall in love, causing Arjun to question his original selfish motives. Just as things start looking up, a mysterious figure from the past emerges with secrets capable of destroying both their relationships.

== Cast ==
=== Main ===
- Abhishek Kumar as Arjun Thakur: A globally celebrated, modern chef-investor and sharp consultant (2026)
- Shiny Doshi as Meera Nair: A traditional and determined chef fighting to preserve her late father's heritage South Indian restaurant (2026)

=== Recurring ===
- Nehalaxmi Iyer as Saundharya "Sunny" Nair: Armaan's partner (2026)
- Anupam K. Sinha as Sidhappa (2026)
- Deepak Maan as Sameer (2026)
- Rajvirr Purii as Prince (2026)
- Siddhivinayak Chavan as Appa (2026)
- Prerna Sehajpal (2026)
- Aman Singh as Armaan: Sunny's partner (2026)
- Vijayalaxmi Gurav (2026)
- Karan Khanna as Danny (2026)

== Production ==
=== Development ===
The show was announced by Balaji Digital, digital content division of Balaji Studios Original. Ekta Kapoor serves as main creative head and This marks Surbhi Chandna as a producer and Feel Good Studios' first production. The project is executed by Surbhi and her husband Karan Sharma under Feel Good Studios as the showrunners.

=== Casting ===
Shiny Doshi was cast as chef Meera Nair hailing from Kerala. Earlier it was said that Vivek Dahiya and Shoaib Ibrahim were considered to play male lead, chef Arjun Thakur but the role went to Abhishek Kumar. Nehalaxmi Iyer also joined the show after 5-year long hiatus from screen as rebellious Sunny, a chef aspiring to become a fashion designer.

=== Release ===
It aired Every Monday, Wednesday and Friday at 6 p.m. at Balaji YouTube channel. Production officially kicked off on 19 April 2026. The filming of season 1 shoot wrapped up on 30 May 2026. The first season of Ishk Dum Aur Idli Rasam concluded on 17 July 2026.

=== Soundtrack ===
The Ishk Dum Aur Idli Rasam Original Soundtrack was primarily composed by Yash Tiwari, under his music project label, Yash Music alongside music composers Kavya Daga and Kriti Daga, also known as KavyaKriti.

The album was produced by actress and producer Surbhi Chandna, who also wrote several of the track lyrics under the banner Feel Good Originals.

The 8-track album includes:

- Faasley – Performed by KavyaKriti.
- Kaisa Ranjish – Released in both male (sung by Yashraj Kapil) and female (by KavyaKriti) versions.
- Arjun's Sacrifice – A prominent character theme composed by Yash Tiwari.
- Badass Sunny – Features vocals by Kavyakriti, Yashraj Kapil, and Salamat Khan.
- Jaan E Jaan – Sung by Aman Sanjee Singh, composed by Yash Tiwari
- Kya Isko Hi Kehte Hai Pyaar – By KavyaKriti
- Sunny Armaan First Love – Performed by Yashraj Kapil and KavyaKriti

== Awards and nominations ==
Year	Award	Category	Nominee	Result	Ref.
2026	12th International Iconic Awards	Best Actor	Abhishek Kumar	Won	
2026	12th International Iconic Awards	Best Actress	Shiny Doshi	Won	
2026	12th International Iconic Awards	Best Original Soundtrack	Surbhi Chandna & Karan Sharma	Won	
