= Desi Explorers =

- Based on: Travel web series
- Country of origin: India
- Original language: Hindi
- No. of seasons: 3
- No. of episodes: 16

Production
- Producers: Sunny Arora, Anand mishra
- Production locations: Jordan, Taiwan, Yas Island
- Running time: 10 minutes
- Production company: Marinating Films Pvt Ltd.

Original release
- Release: 2016

Desi Explorers is an Indian web based travel show hosted by a group of Indian television actors. The show has currently finished its third season consisting of Desi Explorers Jordan, Desi Explorers Taiwan and Desi Explorers Yas Island (Abu Dhabi). The actors are taken to the places and are shown exploring the various sites.

== Cast ==
=== Desi Explorers Jordan ===
- Kishwer Merchantt
- Sukirti Kandpal
- Suyyash Rai
- Vishal Singh
- Vrushika Mehta

=== Desi Explorers Taiwan ===
- Jay Soni
- Kishwer Merchantt
- Sara Khan
- Sukirti Kandpal
- Surbhi Jyoti
- Vrushika Mehta

=== Desi Explorers Yas Island ===
- Tanya Sharma
- Pooja Gor
- Jay Soni
- Karan Wahi
- Surbhi Jyoti
- Srishty Rode
- Tina Dutta
