= Brahmarakshas =

Indian television series

- Genre: Drama; Supernatural fiction Thriller
- Created by: Ekta Kapoor
- Written by: Srinita Bhoumick; Gautam Hegde; Nikita Dhond; Rekha Modi
- Story by: Surbhi Sachal Sachdeva
- Directed by: Dinesh Mahadev; Rajesh Ranshinge; Deepak Chauhan
- Creative directors: Chloe Ferns; Mukta Dhond; Nivedita Basu; Prachi Tiwari; Shaalu kadar kazi(kk)
- Starring: Krystle D'Souza; Aham Sharma; Nikki Sharma; Pearl V Puri; Leenesh Mattoo; Amisha Shrivastava
- Theme music composer: Vinod Ghimire
- Country of origin: India
- Original language: Hindi
- No. of seasons: 2
- No. of episodes: 94

Production
- Producers: Ekta Kapoor; Shobha Kapoor
- Production locations: Mumbai, India
- Cinematography: Ravi Mishra; Pradeep Gupta; Ganesh Sankala
- Editors: Vishal Sharma; Vikas Sharma; Sandeep Varma
- Camera setup: Multi-camera
- Running time: 45-60 Minutes
- Production company: Balaji Telefilms

Original release
- Network: Zee TV
- Release: 6 August 2016 – 4 April 2021

Brahmarakshas is an Indian Hindi-language supernatural thriller television series that aired on Zee TV for two seasons. It is digitally available on ZEE5. It is a franchise produced by Ekta Kapoor under her studio Balaji Telefilms.

The first season titled Brahmarakshas... Jaag Utha Shaitaan, starring Krystle D'Souza and Aham Sharma, aired from 6 August 2016 to 18 February 2017. It was loosely based on the fantasy thriller film Jaani Dushman and the western fairy tale, Beauty and the Beast.

The second season titled Brahmarakshas 2: Phir Jaag Utha Shaitaan, starring Pearl V Puri and Nikki Sharma aired from 22 November 2020 to 4 April 2021.

== Series overview ==
Season	Episodes	Originally broadcast (India)	
Season	Episodes	First aired	Last aired
1	57	6 August 2016	18 February 2017
2	37	22 November 2020	4 April 2021

== Plot ==
=== Season 1 ===
Sanjay Thakur, a landlord of a small village named Kamalpura, marries Aparajita. On their wedding night, she betrays him and pushes him off from the top of his mansion for his wealth. Attacked by a gorilla, Sanjay Thakur's soul is captured into the animal's body and he becomes a Brahmarakshas (a demon). He is angered whenever he sees brides with bridal jewellery and vermilion. He kills them as it reminds him of Aparajita.

==== Twenty years later ====
In Mumbai, a family decides to conduct a destination wedding for their daughter, Rakhi, at Kamalpura. Rakhi is close to her best friend Raina and easy-go-lucky flirting brother Rishabh. The whole family leaves for Kamalpura.

Learning that Rakhi loves Varun, an ordinary man, her family didn't want her to marry him, However, Raina and Rishabh get them married secretly in Kamalpura. Seeing Rakhi as a bride, Sanjay kills her and her husband, Varun. Left shattered, Rishabh and Raina decide to seek revenge from Sanjay. Raina and Rishabh marry in order to bring Brahmarakshas in front of them and kill him. However, they are only able to hurt him, and he doesn't die.

Thinking Brahmarakshas has died, Aparajita returns to Kamalpura. Raina discovers that Aparajita is Mohini's best friend who is very close to Rishabh. She also discovers that Sanjay became Brahmarakshas because of Aparajita and also that she is not her parents' real daughter. Her parents were the first couple who had been killed by Sanjay after becoming Brahmarakshas. Raina reveals the truth to Rishabh, however he refuses to believe her. As Aparajita's truth is discovered, a dangerous animal kills her and she becomes another Brahmarakshas. An enraged Aparajita tries to kill Raina multiple times but fails. Later into thee story, Aparajita is murdered by Sanjay, who is under Mohini and Kanaknath's control. Mohini is revealed as the real antagonist who is a greedy woman after money and powers of Narsimha which she'd obtain through Narsimha stone.

Rishabh's brother Yug learns that Mohini is Rishabh's aunt and his real parents are Ashish and Sudha. His wife Naina discovers this but then she is tied and locked in the house basement, where Rishabh's real mother Sudha is found. Mohini takes Sudha to Asursthal to kill her but Raina brings her back. Wanting to awake Narsimha, Mohini takes Raina and Rishabh along with her. They discover her truth.

Mohini loses a Narsimha stone, which breaks. Due to its intense light, the stone captures Rishabh into the stone. Mohini snatches it but is killed by Sanjay. While dying, she reveals to Raina about Narsimha. Rishabh comes out of the stone and notices changes in himself. Narsimha enters into his body. Sanjay gains more powers and kills Naina. Sanjay and Narsimha fight. Sanjay wanted the powers from Narsimha.

As Sanjay takes the gem containing Narsimha's powers, he throws it but Raina finds it. She grabs the sword and stabs Sanjay who finally dies. Raina and Rishabh reunite.

=== Season 2 ===
Raghav and Vishakha organized a Diwali and birthday party for their daughter Kalindi. Raghav's best friend Shakti Mehra and his wife with son Angad going to London for his business expansion. Raghav's loyal person Prithvi and his wife Shalini want money and jewelry from Kali Mandir. Akshay appoint a Tantrik Jwala, he wants Kalindi's horoscope when they gave her horoscope, he become extremely happy as he found that girl who will help him to become immortal lifelong. He gave order to them to bring this girl right now but they send Komal not Kalindi but Jwala recognize that she is not that girl. Raghav call Balan to take Kalindi with her but he joins hands with Prithvi for money and give Kalindi to him. In anger Jwala roped off Prithvi, Balan and Akshay from the pillar. Raghav feels not good so he went to Kali Mandir and he sees all as soon as Kalindi's sacrifice Pooja was going to end. He says to Jwala stop this pooja but he also roped off from the pillar then he looked at Prithvi and Akshay asked him, what are you doing here, you guys were at home and where did you get the key of the vault of the temple. They told him they want jewelry and money from Kali Mandir. Raghav starts praying to Kali Maa to stop this evil work as soon as Jwala runs away but killed by Brahmarakshas and soul of Jwala gets transferred to him. Here Prithvi and Shalini kill Raghav and Vishakha and take her daughters.

==== 16 years later ====
All grown up, Kalindi and Minty live with Prithvi bearing taunts from Shalini and her daughters. Kalindi is shown to be a mature woman who feels indebted to Prithvi assuming that he is clearing her father's debts, unbeknownst to his involvement in her parents' death. Prithvi pulls a facade of a loving uncle to Kalindi and Minty in hopes of getting all of Kalindi's property. Angad is now a London-based businessman along with his father and a soccer player, shown to be a casanova. The Mehras return to India on Shakti's insistence to get his sons married to Raghav's daughters which is not well taken by his wife, Damini. Prithvi and Shalini lie to Shakti that Kalindi died not long after her parents' death and that Minty is married. They convince Shakti to get his sons married to the former's daughters while Angad is smitten with Kalindi, assuming her to be one of Prithvi's three daughters. Brahmarakshas possesses Vardhaan Choudary, a well known businessman, and searches for Kalindi. He finds her soon and tries many ways to woo her and later asks her hand in marriage by making her believe that he will help her find the secret of Brahmarakshas to which Kalindi agrees. On learning this Angad is heartbroken and tries many tactics to cancel the wedding but is unsuccessful. Later on the wedding day Prithvi and Shalini tries to kill Kalindi but are unsure as Angad saves her but brahmarakshas renders Angad unconscious and kidnaps Kalindi and tries to wed her when she is unconscious but Angad comes at right time and saves her and informs her of Vardhaan being the Brahmarakshas and she vanquishes brahmaraksas and kills Gehna.

==== 2 months later ====
Brahmarakshas is revealed to be alive. Angad and Paridhi's haldi ceremony takes place. Madan comes out of the coma. The Brahmarakshas wreaks havoc again. Kalindi and Angad get Madan home. Angad gets jealous seeing Madan and Kalindi getting closer. The inspector learns something suspicious about Madan. Later, Kalindi seeks Madan's help. Angad gets a doubt on Madan. The incident at the mall raises Angad's suspicion on Madan. When the coconut turns black, Shalini thinks that Prithvi is Brahmarakshas. Brahmarakshas kills Inspector Shabana and Angad vows to expose the truth. Mahamaya Ma tells Shalini that Brahmarakshas is in the house. Angad summons Brahmarakshas and inadvertently saves Balan's life. Later, in a trance, Balan conveys Brahmarakshas's message and tries to kill Prithvi. Angad tries to explain to Kalindi that Madan is Brahmarakshas. Angad learns that Uma is his childhood friend Kalindi. Later, Kalindi learns Prithvi's truth and rushes to save Madan. Madan is saved by Kalindi but Brahmarakshas appears. Meanwhile, Damini stops Angad's marriage with Paridhi and shows everyone a video of Paridhi and Sid together, surprising everyone. Angad leaves the wedding and goes to find Kalindi and saves her from the Brahmarakshas. It is then revealed that After the trio return home, Prithvi fakes getting a heart attack and told everyone that Uma is Kalindi and that Kalindi should marry Angad and the preparation for Angad and Kalindi's starts. Meanwhile, Madan tells Kalindi not to marry Angad as Brahmarakshas could take anyone's form and he could take Angad's form and marry her so its not safe for her. Angad, Kalindi, Minty, Robin, Sakshi and Paridhi go for a picnic in the jungle. Where Paridhi learns of Kalindi's plan of leaving her wedding with Angad and marrying Madan. Paridhi agrees to help her by taking her place at the wedding with Angad. Angad realises the truth and goes to stop Madan and Kalindi's wedding. Brahmarakshas appears and wounds Madan but Kalindi manages to kill Brahmarakshas and Madan dies as well. Then Brahmarakshas is shown jumping out of the fire and is revealed to be alive. Prithvi tells Kalindi that Vikram is guilty of Raghav's death. Kalindi's words hurt Minty and she leaves the house for Robin. A revelation about Robin takes place, he is revealed as Brahmarakshas. Vikram dies by burning in front of everyone. Prithvi and Shalini go to a tantric. Kalindi gives consent to Robin and Minty's relationship and their Roka ceremony takes place. Later, Kalindi uses the solution given in the book to identify Brahmarakshas. Brahmarakshas saves Kalindi from the tantric. Kalindi learns that Robin is Brahmarakshas. Later, when the news of Brahamarakshas' death is broadcast on TV, Kalindi does not believe it. Kalindi tries to make everyone aware of Robin's truth. Later, Robin tells Kalindi that he is Brahmarakshas. A revelation about Brahmarakshas takes place while Angad announces his intention to marry Kalindi. Along with the kids, Kalindi makes a plan against Brahmarakshas. Due to Brahmarakshas, Kalindi gets proven wrong before Angad during the sangeet ceremony. Later, Angad sets the ‘granth’ on fire. Kalindi decides to sacrifice herself to save Robin. During Minty's haldi ceremony, Angad suspects that Kalindi has made a plan and asks her to tell the truth. Later, Brahmarakshas accepts Kalindi's condition. Kalindi saves Robin and puts an end to Brahmarakshas. Later, she falls prey to Prithvi's plan. And is later declared dead.

==== 2 years later ====
A secret agent is revealed and a new story begins.

In Delhi, a girl named Chandni steals a necklace and reaches Ambala. It is revealed that Chandni is the twin sister of Kalindi, who is also born in Rohini. As she steps on the ash of Brahmarakshas, it becomes alive again and kidnaps Chandni believing she is Kalindi to marry her. Soon, Kalindi is revealed to be alive as well. The Brahmarakshas gains control over Inspector Yug. Posing as her twin Kalindi, Chandni returns with Angad, who discerns that Chandni is not Kalindi. Meanwhile, Prithvi and Shalini try to kill Chandni. Iravat foils Guru Ma's attempt to release Kalindi. He learns Kalindi and Chandni's truth from her and informs Yug. Meanwhile, Chandni's bravery impresses Angad. Later, Yug locates Chandni and attempts to arrest her, only to be stopped by Angad. Chandni prepares for Ishaan and Sona's wedding. Yug gets Kalindi home and Guru Ma vows to save her from Yug and Iravat's clutches. Angad senses that Kalindi is nearby, while Guru Ma helps her escape from the house.

Sona and Ishaan's haldi ceremony begins. Prithvi tells Yug that an impostor is staying at his house. Prithvi then abducts Chandini and hands her over to Yug. On learning about it, Angad rescues Chandini and brings her home. Chandini tries to win Angad's heart but he asks her to leave the house. Robin and Minty give a piece of good news to the family. They tell the family that Minty is pregnant, resulting in Angad stopping Chandni from leaving the house. Later, suspicious of Yug, Angad reaches his house to seek the truth and is attacked by Iravat. Yug lies to Kalindi about her past. At the hospital, Kalindi helps Angad but fails to recognise him. A girl discovers the truth about Yug and Kalindi brings her home. At the hospital, one of the nurses tells Kalindi about a job. At home, Chandini gives a surprise to Angad and proposes to him. Angad doesn't give her an answer but after she risks her life to save his life he changes his mind, post which they get engaged. Posing as Minty's nurse, Kalindi sees her picture in the house. Chandini tries to see Minti's nurse's face. Later, Kalindi's clothes catch fire during Holika Dahan. Yug gets shocked on seeing Kalindi at Angad's house. He puts forth a condition before Prithvi, who plots to get Minty's nurse fired. Angad goes to the hospital to solve a mystery. Kalindi learns that Chandni is her twin. Brahmarakshas tries to kill Angad, but in vain. Later, Kalindi and Chandni join forces and kill Brahmarakshas. Chandni dies sacrificing her life for Kalindi and Angad. Angad and Kalindi unite. After sometime, Angad and Kalindi look at the sky together. They smile and see the broken star and pray.

Meanwhile, the Brahmarakshas becomes alive again and roars, looking out for a powerful body to possess.

== Cast ==
=== Season 1 ===
==== Main ====
- Krystle D'Souza as Raina Shrivastava: Rishabh's wife; Suresh's adoptive daughter
- Aham Sharma as Rishabh Shrivastava/Narsimha: Raina's husband; Sudha and Ashish's son; Nalin and Mohini's foster-son; Rakhi's brother
- Parag Tyagi as Sanjay Thakur/Brahmarakshas: Aparajita's husband

==== Recurring ====
- Rakshanda Khan as Mohini Shrivastava: Nalin's wife; Yug's mother; Aditya's sister; Aparajita's best friend; Rishabh and Rakhi's aunt and foster mother
- Kishwer Merchant as Aparajita Thakur/Brahmarakshas: Sanjay's wife and killer; Mohini's best friend
- Shailesh Datar as Nalin Shrivastava: Mohini's husband; Yug's father; Rishabh and Rakhi's uncle and foster father
- Abhaas Mehta as Yug Shrivastava: Nalin and Mohini's son; Rishabh and Rakhi's cousin and foster brother; Naina's husband
- Ojaswi Oberoi as Naina Shrivastava: Yug's wife
- Rishabh Shukla as Thakur Aditya Nigam: Mohini's brother; Mitali and Ved's father
- Kunal Vohra as Vedaaksh "Ved" Nigam: Aditya's son; Mitali's brother
- Shrashti Maheshwari as Mitali Nigam: Aditya's daughter; Ved's sister
- Manorama Bhattishyam as Phooli Singh Chhabra: Shivam's mother
- Karan Chhabra as Shivam Singh Chhabra: Phooli's son; Raina's friend
- Charu Mehra as Rakhi Shrivastava: Rishabh's sister; Ashish and Sudha's daughter; Ajay's fiancé; Varun's wife
- Udit Shukla as Varun: Rakhi's husband
- Sahil Uppal as Ajay Malhotra: Rakhi's fiancé; Raina's brother figure
- Karan Sharma as Anil Malhotra
- Sonia Rakkar as Gayatri Malhotra
- Apara Mehta as Jasmeet Shrivastava/Jassi Dadi: Rishabh and Rakhi's grandmother; Nalin's Bua
- Nikunj Malik as Kiara Sareen: Rishabh's ex-girlfriend
- Komal Sharma as Sudha Shrivastava: Ashish's wife, Rishabh and Rakhi's mother
- Alefia Kapadia as Kammo
- Mridul Das as Shyam: Nalin's nephew; Mishri's wife
- Amisha Shrivastava as Mishri: Shyam's wife
- Shahab Khan as Suresh: Raina's adoptive father; Malhotra's manager
- Sunil Bob as Kanakraj: Mohini's helper

=== Season 2 ===
==== Main ====
- Nikki Sharma as Kalindi Mehra (née Sharma): Vishaka and Raghav's foster daughter and Minty's foster sister; Angad's love interest turned wife (2020–21)
  - as Chandni: Kalindi's twin sister. She sacrifices her life for her twin sister Kalindi and her lover Angad (2020–21) (deceased)
- Pearl V Puri as Angad Mehra: Shakti and Damini's son; Robin's brother and Kalindi's love interest turned husband (2020–21)
- Vaidehi Nair as Minty Sharma: Raghav and Vishakha's younger daughter; Kalindi's foster sister; Robin's love interest-turned-wife (2020–21)
- Rohit Choudhary as Robin Mehra: Shakti and Damini's younger son; Angad's younger brother; Minty's love interest-turned-husband (2020–21)
- Chetan Hansraj as Vardaan Chaudhary/Brahmarakshas (2020)
- Neel Motwani as Madan Srivastav: A priest who wants to kill Brahmarakshas, Angad and Kalindi's friend (2020) (deceased)
- Leenesh Mattoo as Siddharth: Vikram's son; Sakshi's husband (2020–21)
- Arpit Ranka as Yug Suryavanshi (2021) (deceased)

==== Recurring ====
- Mihir Mishra as Raghav Sharma: Kalindi's adoptive father and Minty's father; Vishakha's husband (2020)
- Ekta Sharma as Vishakha Sharma: Kalindi's adoptive mother and Minty's mother; Raghav's wife (2020)
- Ashish Kaul as Shakti Mehra: Angad and Robin's father; Raghav's best friend (2020–21)
- Roma Bali as Damini Mehra: Shakti's wife; Angad and Robin's mother (2020–21)
- Nikhil Arya as Prithvi Sharma: Shalini's husband; Paridhi, Sakshi and Raunak's father (2020–21)
- Papiya Sengupta as Shalini Sharma: Prithvi's wife; Paridhi, Sakshi and Raunak's mother (2020–21)
- Hemant Choudhary as Balan: Raghav's servant (2020–21)
- Rupa Divetia as Gehna: Jwala's helper before 16 years; Tantrik's lover and wife; Vardaan's helper (2020)
- Manish Khanna as Tantrik Jwala; Gehna's lover and husband: Angad killed him (2020)
- Shivani Jha as Sakshi Sharma: Prithvi and Shalini's daughter; Siddharth's wife (2020–21)
- Aafreen Dabestani as Paridhi "Pari" Sharma: Prithvi and Shalini's elder daughter; Siddharth's ex-girlfriend, Angad's ex-fiancée (2020–21)
- Aanchal Srivastava as Raunak Sharma: Prithvi and Shalini's younger daughter (2020–21)
- Kalyani Chaitanya as Gurumaaa (future predictor)
- Ahmad Harhash as Ravi Singh Rathore

== Production ==
=== Casting ===
Pearl V Puri was selected to play the male lead and Nikki Sharma was cast to play the female lead for the second season of the show.Chetan Hansraj was selected to play the titular role of the second season.

== Reception ==
=== Critical response (season 1) ===
Times Of India stated, "The show definitely has a gripping storyline, and the viewers just don't know what to expect next. It's fast-paced, edgy and doesn't give you time to think".

=== Ratings ===
Week and year	Episodes	BARC viewership (Hindi GEC overall)		Ref.
Week and year	Episodes	Impressions (in millions)	Ranking	Ref.
Week 32, 2016	1–2	10.82	2	
Week 33, 2016	3–4	10.27	2	
Week 34, 2016	5–6	9.92	2	
Week 35, 2016	7–8	10.64	3	
Week 36, 2016	9–10	11.52	2	
Week 37, 2016	11–12	11.31	1	
Week 38, 2016	13–14	12.38	2	
Week 39, 2016	15–16	11.46	1	
Week 40, 2016	17–18	10.92	1	
Week 41, 2016	19–20	9.11	6	
Week 42, 2016	20–21	7.50	5	
Week 43, 2016	22–23	7.06	7	

== See also ==
- List of Hindi horror shows
