= Munde Patiala De =

Munde Patiale De
- Film poster
- Directed by: Mohan Sharma
- Produced by: Rajesh Lahr
- Production company: Tarajee Entertainment
- Release date: 30 December 2012
- Running time: 104 minutes
- Country: India
- Language: Punjabi

Munde Patiale De is a 2012 comedy Punjabi film. The film is directed by Mohan Sharma and produced by Rajesh Lahr under the banner of Tarajee Entertainment.

== Plot ==
It is a story of three college friends Samar, Gill and Lucky, who meet up after a long time at Samar's wedding, and the funny situations that they land in form the plot. An out-and-out comedy, this movie has a rather young cast.

== Cast ==
- Gaurav Kakkar
- Aman Jot
- Surbhi Jyoti as Priyanka
- Rahul Kalra
- Binnu Dhillon
- Satwant Kau
- Sanyam Nikhanj
