= Qubool Hai 2.0 =

Indian web series

- Directed by: Ankush Mohla; Glen Barretto
- Starring: Karan Singh Grover; Surbhi Jyoti
- Country of origin: India
- Original languages: Hindi, Urdu
- No. of seasons: 1
- No. of episodes: 10

Production
- Producers: Abhigyan Jha; Mrinal Jha
- Production locations: Belgrade, Novi Sad (Serbia)
- Running time: 25 minutes
- Production company: MAJ Productions

Original release
- Network: ZEE5
- Release: 12 March 2021

Related
- Qubool Hai

Qubool Hai 2.0 (transl. Accepted 2.0) is an Indian Hindi/Urdu-language web series, starring Karan Singh Grover and Surbhi Jyoti. Produced by Mrinal Jha under MAJ Productions, this web series is directed by Glen Barretto and Ankush Mohla. Also, it premiered on ZEE5 on 12 March 2021.

== Cast ==
=== Main ===
- Karan Singh Grover as Asad Ahmed Khan–Dilshad and Rashid Ahmed Khan's son, Zoya's love interest.
- Surbhi Jyoti as Zoya Farooqi / Angel Simmons– Gen.Bhakhtiyar Farooqi and Shama Farooqi's daughter, Asad's love interest

=== Recurring ===
- Mandira Bedi as Damini Sood
- Arif Zakaria as Gen.Bhakhtiyar Farooqi– Major General of Pakistan's Islamabad force, Zoya's caring father and Shama's ex-husband
- Gurpreet Bedi as Sana Shaikh
- Lillete Dubey as Nilofer Farooqi– Bakhtiyar's younger sister and Zoya's pupphi (aunt)
- Saurabh Raj Jain as Hassan Farooqi
- Nehalaxmi Iyer as Najma Ahmed Khan– Dilshad and Rashid Ahmed Khan's younger daughter and Asad's beloved younger sister who is a foody and technology and hacking queen
- Aryamann Seth as Ayaan Ahmed Khan- Rashid Ahmed Khan's son and Asad and Najma's half-brother
- Abhishek Sharma as Zoheb Farooqi
- Sonja Iris as Anika Farooqi- Zoheb's wife
- Priyal Gor as Aasma Qureshi– Asad's ex-girlfriend
- Vishal Nayak as RAW agent and Damini Sood's assistant
- Prince Dhiman as RAW agent and Damini Sood's assistant
- Kavita Ghai as Shama Farooqi– Zoya's mother and Gen.Bhakhtiyar Farooqi's ex-wife
- Ankit Raaj as Salmaan Ansari
- Gulfam Khan as Fatima Ansari - Salmaan's mother
- Shalini Kapoor Sagar as Dilshad- Rashid's ex-wife and Asad and Najma's mother
- Daksh Sharma as Rizwan Sheikh
- Vaquar Shaikh as Rashid Ahmed Khan - Dilshad's ex-husband and Asad, Ayaan and Najma's father
- Aideh Alfandi as Razia Ahmed Khan Gaffor,s wife Humaira,s mother

== Episodes ==
Series	Episodes	Originally released
1	10	12 March 2021

=== Season 1 ===
No.	Title	Directed by	Written by	Original release date
1	"Stars Collide"	Glen Barretto and Ankush Mohla	Mrinal Jha	12 March 2021
Zoya and Asad run into each other while they are at a critical turn in their lives. The first meeting turns out adventurous for both of them as it involves car chase and a shootout. They part ways thinking they won’t meet again, but universe has a different plan.
2	"Two Hearts in a Hotel"	Glen Barretto and Ankush Mohla	Mrinal Jha	12 March 2021
Asad gets annoyed with Zoya’s silly shayaris. Meanwhile, Indian intelligence is tracking every move of Zoya in Asad’s absence. Out of nowhere, some goons arrive at the hotel to get Zoya.
3	"Life on the (L)edge"	Glen Barretto and Ankush Mohla	Mrinal Jha	12 March 2021
Zoya and Asad find themselves in a critical situation, yet again. They escape from the goons, reach a popular tourist spot where they put a lock of love on the bridge together. After all this, when they finally reach the airport and Asad arranges a charter plane for Zoya, he discovers a shocking truth.
4	"Flight or Fight"	Glen Barretto and Ankush Mohla	Mrinal Jha	12 March 2021
Asad rushes to help Zoya when he finds out that she is in danger. He travels to Pakistan with her and they find interesting aspects about each other during the journey. However, Asad gets an unexpected welcome when they land in Islamabad.
5	"New Country, Old Foes"	Glen Barretto and Ankush Mohla	Mrinal Jha	12 March 2021
Zoya is trying to make Asad feel comfortable, but her family is not happy about having an Indian guest. General Bakhtiyar, Zoya’s father, makes a few comments against Indians, to which Asad gives a fitting reply. Later, General Bakhtiyar challenges Asad for a round of rifle shooting but things take an unexpected turn.
6	"The Truth"	Glen Barretto and Ankush Mohla	Mrinal Jha	12 March 2021
General Bakhtiyar is killed when Zoya’s house is attacked and they take shelter in a bunker. Zoya continues to trust Asad but Zoya’s aunt is suspicious about Asad’s intentions. Asad is feeling guilty for betraying Zoya and the time is running out.
7	"The Search"	Glen Barretto and Ankush Mohla	Mrinal Jha	12 March 2021
Zoya feels sorry for the way Zoheb and his wife Anika is treated by her aunt. Back in India, Asad’s family is worried for Asad’s life after hearing General Bakhtiyar’s news. Asad keeps searching for the codes in the house, when he is caught by the guard, but an unexpected guest comes to his rescue.
8	"The Proposal"	Glen Barretto and Ankush Mohla	Mrinal Jha	12 March 2021
Zoya confronts Asad about an inconsiderate proposal and he messes up. Asad comes up with a brilliant idea to impress Zoya and cheers her up. Enemies start gathering information about Asad and Najma reveals vital information to a mole, accidentally.
9	"Race Against Time"	Glen Barretto and Ankush Mohla	Mrinal Jha	12 March 2021
Asad escapes the arrest, however, he has to return to India with the codes. Zoya does respond to Asad’s proposal but he cannot express his feelings. Will he leave Zoya alone in Pakistan? In the meantime, Najma ends up killing a person accidentally and must get out of this mess.
10	"Will She, Won’t She?"	Glen Barretto and Ankush Mohla	Mrinal Jha	12 March 2021
Asad and Zoya are chased by the soldiers when they head towards the airport. Zoya starts realizing that something is not right, when they reach airport. Will Zoya trust Asad and go with him?
