= Leenesh Mattoo =

Indian actor

- Born: Srinagar, Jammu & Kashmir, India
- Occupation: Actor
- Years active: 2014–present
- Known for: Ishqbaaaz; Dil Boley Oberoi; Brahmarakshas 2 Bade Achhe Lagte Hain 2

Leenesh Mattoo is an Indian actor who primarily works in Hindi television. Mattoo is widely recognised for his portrayal of Rudra Singh Oberoi in Ishqbaaaz and its spin-off series, Dil Boley Oberoi. He is also known for playing Siddharth in Brahmarakshas 2, Angad Shekhawat in Bade Achhe Lagte Hain 2 and Rishi in Pashminna – Dhaage Mohabbat Ke.

== Personal life ==
Mattoo was born and brought up in Srinagar, Jammu and Kashmir, India into a Kashmiri Pandit family.

Mattoo met actress Shivani Jha on the sets of Brahmarakshas 2 in 2020, and the couple is in a relationship since 2021.

== Career ==
Mattoo made his acting debut in 2014 with Suhani Si Ek Ladki. From 2014 to 2016, he played Anuj Birla opposite Debashree Biswas in the show.

From 2016 to 2018, Mattoo played Rudra Singh Oberoi in Ishqbaaaz opposite Mansi Srivastava and Nehalaxmi Iyer. The show proved to be a major success for him. Mattoo received the Indian Telly Award for Best Actor in a Comic Role nomination for the show. In 2017, he played Rudra in Indian television's first spin-off series, Dil Boley Oberoi opposite Mansi Srivastava.

From 2020 to 2021, Mattoo played Siddharth in Brahmarakshas 2, opposite Shivani Jha. In 2020, he made his web debut with Bhalla Calling Bhalla, playing Sahil Bhalla. From 2021 to 2022, he played Aarav Singh Rathore in Tere Bina Jiya Jaye Na.

In 2023, Mattoo played Angad Shekhawat in Bade Achhe Lagte Hain 2, opposite Pooja Banerjee. Since February 2024, Mattoo is seen portraying Rishi opposite Isha Sharma in Pashminna – Dhaage Mohabbat Ke.

== Filmography ==
=== Television ===
Year	Title	Role	Notes	Ref.
2014–2016	Suhani Si Ek Ladki	Anuj Birla		
2016–2018	Ishqbaaaz	Rudra Singh Oberoi		
2017	Dil Boley Oberoi	Rudra Singh Oberoi		
2020–2021	Brahmarakshas 2	Siddharth		
2021–2022	Tere Bina Jiya Jaye Na	Aarav Singh Rathore		
2023	Bade Achhe Lagte Hain 2	Angad Shekhawat		
2024	Pashminna – Dhaage Mohabbat Ke	Rishi		

=== Web series ===
Year	Title	Role	Notes	Ref.
2020	Bhalla Calling Bhalla	Sahil Bhalla	Zee5 series	

=== Music videos ===
Year	Title	Singer	Ref.
2021	Pehla Pyaar	Rahul Jain	

== Awards and nominations ==
Year	Award	Category	Work	Result	Ref.
2018	Gold Awards	Most Fit Actor (Male)	—N/a	Nominated	
2019	Indian Telly Awards	Best Actor in a Comic Role	Ishqbaaaz	Nominated	
