= Sherdil Shergill =

Indian television series

- Genre: Romantic comedy Drama
- Created by: Saurabh Tewari
- Story by: Srinita Bhoumick; Saurabh Tewari
- Directed by: Praveen Punia
- Starring: See below
- Country of origin: India
- Original language: Hindi
- No. of seasons: 1
- No. of episodes: 95

Production
- Producer: Saurabh Tewari
- Production location: Mumbai
- Camera setup: Multi-camera
- Running time: 16-43 min
- Production company: Parin Multimedia

Original release
- Network: Colors TV
- Release: 26 September 2022 – 10 February 2023

Sherdil Shergill (transl. Lionheart Shergill) is an Indian Hindi-language television romantic comedy drama series that aired on Colors TV from 26 September 2022 to 10 February 2023. It is digitally available on Voot. Produced by Saurabh Tewari under Parin Multimedia, it stars Dheeraj Dhoopar and Surbhi Chandna.

== Plot ==
The story introduces Manneet Shergill, a 30-year-old architect who has achieved recognition in the male-dominated field of architecture despite past challenges from her family and society. As a single parent to her son, Anmol Shergill, conceived through IVF, she faces further complications when invited to her sister Gunjan's wedding. Her father stipulates that she may only attend if she leaves Anmol at home.

Unwillingly, Manmeet has assigned a trainee at her office, Rajkumar Yadav, who is playful and fun at all times. Manmeet soon realises that Raj is actually a stand-up comedian. Since knowing his secret, Manmeet requests him to become her (fake) husband just for the time of Gunjan’s marriage; to face no obstacles from society and the family. Helpless, and desperate to hide from his namesake girlfriend Nikki, Raj agrees to Manmeet’s plead.

At Shimla, Raj manages to unite Manmeet with her father, as the latter has been at odds with for years. However, during the marriage ceremony, Bhairav and Nirali Yadav, the parents of Raj, arrive creating a tension. Confused, they question the same while Manmeet apologises and tells them that it was all an act.

Nikki, who is furious at Raj, blackmails Raj with a suicide message. So this time, Raj requests Manmeet to pretend like his wife to convince Nikki. Manmeet and Raj manage to tell Nikki that they are in love. However, Nikki creates a scene and informs the Yadavs once again, causing chaos, as they call over the Shergill family to Mumbai to reveal the truth.

== Cast ==
=== Main ===
- Surbhi Chandna as Manmeet "Chitti" Shergill: Puneet and Ajeet's daughter; Gunjan's sister; Rajkumar's wife; Anmol's mother
- Dheeraj Dhoopar as Rajkumar "Raj" Yadav: Nirali and Bhairav's son; Pankhudi and Priyanka's brother; Manmeet's husband; Anmol's father

=== Recurring ===
- Sai Ballal as Bhairav Yadav: Nirali's husband; Pankhudi, Rajkumar and Priyanka's father; Murari and Manmeet's father-in-law; Anmol's grandfather
- Kiran Deep Sharma as Nirali Yadav: Bhairav's wife; Pankhudi, Rajkumar and Priyanka's mother; Murari and Manmeet's mother-in-law; Anmol's grandmother
- Preeti Singh as Pankhudi Yadav: Bhairav and Nirali's daughter; Rajkumar and Priyanka's sister; Anmol's aunt; Murari's wife
- Bhoomika Mirchandani as Priyanka "Chhoti" Yadav: Bhairav and Nirali's daughter; Punkhudi and Rajkumar's sister; Manmeet and Murari's sister-in-law; Anmol's aunt
- Sunita Rawat Pai as Bhairav and Nirali's daughter; Punkhudi, Rajkumar and Priyanka's sister; Manmeet and Murari's sister-in-law; Anmol's aunt
- Stavya/Hredhaan Mandal as Anmol Yadav: Rajkumar and Manmeet's daughter; Pankhudi, Priyanka and Gunjan's niece; Bhairav and Nirali's granddaughter; Ajeet and Puneet's granddaughter;
- Iqbal Azad as Ajeet Sherdill: Puneet's husband; Manmeet and Gunjan's father; Rajkumar's father-in-law; Anmol's grandfather
- Anindita Chatterjee as Puneet Sherdill: Ajeet's wife; Manmeet and Gunjan's mother; Rajkumar's mother-in-law; Anmol's grandmother
- Sneha Tomar as Gunjan Sherdill: Ajeet and Puneet's daughter; Manmeet's sister; Rajkumar's sister-in-law; Anmol's aunt
- Masshe Uddin Qureshi as Murari: Pankhudi's husband
- Ayesha Kapoor as Nikki: Rajkumar's former girlfriend
- Srishti Mandal as Vidya: Manmeet's helper; Anmol's nanny
- Nitin Bhatia as Radhe
- Aarya Dharmchand Kumar as Hussain: Manmeet's partner in 'Soorti constructions'
- Ahmad Harhash as Raj Kumar Anmol’s friend who Ruled to be his friend

== Production ==
=== Casting ===
In June 2022, Dheeraj Dhoopar was cast for the lead role of Rajkumar Yadav. Surbhi Chandna was signed as the female lead Manmeet Shergill.

Sneha Tomar was cast to play Manmeet's sister Gunjan in the series. Ayesha Kapoor was cast as Rajkumar's girlfriend Nikki.

=== Filming ===
The shooting of the series, began in June 2022. It is mainly shot at the Film City, Mumbai. Some initial sequences were shot in Shimla.

=== Release ===
Sherdil Shergill's promos were released in July 2022. It premiered on 26 September 2022 on Colors TV and on Voot.

=== Cancellation ===
The show went off-air within four months due to low ratings. The show bid adieu to viewers on February 10.

== Reception ==
Sukarna Mondal of The Times of India stated, "Sherdil Shergill looks promising with two big names paired for the first time. Surbhi and Dheeraj’s pairing is quite refreshing. Also, Surbhi underplays Manmeet compared to how successful her character is established."

== See also ==
- List of programmes broadcast by Colors TV
