= Qubool Hai =

Indian soap opera

- Genre: Indian soap opera
- Created by: Mrinal Jha; Gul Khan
- Written by: Mrinal Jha; Faizal Akhtar; Jainesh Ejardar; Sweksha Bhagat; Divy Nidhi Sharma; Aparajita Sharma
- Directed by: Amandeep Singh; Arif Ali Ansari; Ajay.S.Mishra
- Creative directors: Megha S. Kumar; Nimisha Pandey; Uday Berry
- Starring: Surbhi Jyoti; Karan Singh Grover; Raqesh Bapat; Amrapali Gupta; Mohit Sehgal; Ketaki Kadam; Karanvir Bohra; Avinash Sachdev; Surbhi Chandna
- Theme music composer: Raju Singh
- Country of origin: India
- Original languages: Hindi; Urdu
- No. of seasons: 4
- No. of episodes: 856

Production
- Producers: Gul Khan; Nissar Parvez; Karishma Jain
- Production locations: Bhopal; Mumbai; Ajmer; Agra; Kolkata; Himachal Pradesh
- Cinematography: Hrishikesh Gandhi
- Camera setup: Multi-camera
- Running time: 22 minutes (approx)
- Production companies: 4 Lions Films; Divine Multimedia

Original release
- Network: Zee TV
- Release: 29 October 2012 – 23 January 2016

Related
- Qubool Hai 2.0

Qubool Hai (transl. I accept) is an Indian soap opera that was produced by 4 Lions Films and broadcast on Zee TV. The series focused on the Muslim community and initially aimed to dispel stereotypes regarding Islam, and had been credited for pioneering Muslim-oriented programming in Indian television.

== Premise ==
The first season of the show focused on the love story of Asad Ahmed Khan and Zoya Farooqui, played by Karan Singh Grover, who was later replaced by Raqesh Bapat, and Surbhi Jyoti. The show was also focused on the lives of Humaira Siddiqui Sheikh, played by Ketki Kadam, Ayaan Ahmed Khan, played by Rishabh Sinha / Vikrant Massey and Haider Sheikh played by Mohit Sehgal.

In May 2014, the second season introduced Asad and Zoya's twin daughters, Sanam and Seher (both played by Jyoti), and revolved around their lives 20 years after the death of their parents. Karanvir Bohra portrayed Sanam's husband Aahil Raza Ibrahim. Shehzad Sheikh joined the cast as Rehan Qureshi, Seher's love interest.

The third season of the show portrayed Aahil and Sanam's incomplete love story after she loses her memory, is transported to Pakistan, and an imposter takes her place.

The fourth season of the show, launched in August 2015 and incorporating supernatural elements, was set 25 years after Sanam's suicide. It focused on the love story of Mahira, who was the result of Sanam's last prayer (again portrayed by Jyoti), and her two husbands - Azaad Iqbal Khan (Rajbeer Singh), who is revealed to be a vampire and is the "fake" Sanam's son, and his long-lost brother, Armaan Iqbal Khan, who receives his heart in a transplant. The show ended in January 2016 after Armaan and Mahira's remarriage.

== Plot ==
=== Season 1 ===
Zoya Farooqui, a fun-loving girl brought up in the USA comes to Bhopal in search of her real father and stays with her foster sister's aunt Dilshad, who has a daughter Najma and a silent, traditional, orthodox and short tempered son Asad Ahmed Khan. Zoya and Asad gradually fall in love, but his childhood friend Tanveer Baig creates obstacles for them. Asad's father Rashid now lives with his much wealthy second wife Shireen, though their son Ayaan has a loving relationship with Asad.

Shireen's brother Ghafoor Siddiqui turns out to be Zoya's biological father, who presumed her dead after his second wife, Razia, killed his first wife (Zoya's mother) in a fire, though Zoya had escaped that time. Rashid and Dilshad unite. Razia and Ghafoor's daughter Humaira loves Ayaan but is shattered as he leaves with Shireen. Haider enters to take revenge for his parents' death but falls in love with and marries Humaira, after knowing he is Zoya's lost brother.

Zoya and Asad marry and eventually become parents to twin daughters, Sanam and Seher. Haider moves to Dubai with the pregnant Humaira. Tanveer traces Asad and Zoya out and brutally stabs and kills them, setting fire to their house. Dilshad escapes with Haya (Najma's daughter) and Sanam, but loses Seher in the fire.

=== Season 2 ===
20 years later

Dilshad, Haya and Sanam live in Punjab. Sanam runs a restaurant and crosses her path with business tycoon Aahil Raza Ibrahim, Tanveer's stepson. She later arrives in Bhopal. Soon, Aahil falls for Sanam and marries her due to Tanveer, who wants to get the property. Sanam and Aahil gradually fall in love. Two brothers Faiz and Raahat fall in love with Haya, who reciprocates Raahat. Faiz tries to attack them, but they kill him and unite. Aahil and Sanam separate when Tanveer finds she's Asad and Zoya's daughter. She kidnaps Sanam and puts an alive Seher in her place.

Soon, Dilshad finds out about Tanveer and reveals Sanam and Seher's history to them. They vow to avenge their parents' death. Tanveer tricks Aahil into marrying a woman who she imposters as Sanam. He later finds out his father Raza is alive. As Aahil dismisses Tanveer, she attacks him but instead kills her own son Rehan. Zoya's soul kills Tanveer. The impostor Sanam, to separate the united Aahil and Sanam, tries to sell Seher to a brothel. Sanam reaches to rescue her but Seher dies. Sanam, unaware of this searches for her and reaches to Lahore.

=== Season 3 ===
Sanam has lost her memory and lives with a Pakistani Major, Shaad Aftaab Khan, who in order to save her life, lied that she is his wife, Jannat. "Jannat" confusingly remembers extracts of her life with Aahil.

Soon, Tanveer's daughter enters their life disguised as Misbah, Shaad's cousin, and kills the family posing as a terrorist. Shaad and Jannat chase Misbah and reach India, where Aahil finds her and suggests they come to Bhopal for her treatment. Shaad realises Jannat is Sanam and leaves her with Aahil. But Sanam's impostor, still living with Aahil, tries to keep her away from him. She pays a man to kill them and successfully kills Aahil. Devastated Sanam regains her memory and vows to take revenge from her husband, Aahil's killers. After taking her revenge from all the murderers except Nayi Sanam, Sanam commits suicide, taking away all her powers.

=== Season 4 ===
25 years later

Mahira takes birth at the same time when Sanam dies. Mahira is the answer to Sanam's last prayer. She comes to Bhopal to stay with her stepsisters. She encounters Fake Sanam (now Khan Begum) who is now miserable without her powers. She also encounters her older son Azaad, and they fall in love. However, Azaad is revealed to be a vampire. Mahira is initially engaged to Amaad (Khan Begum's youngest son) as Azaad rejects her to keep her safe from himself. But Khan Begum later has her marry Azaad on persistence of Razia, who believes only the offspring of true lovers can help them recover Khan Begum's evil powers. But soon, Afreen enters in their lives, killing Amaad and causes a havoc, tormenting and separating the newlyweds. Afreen in her attempt to kill Khan Begum kills Azaad and his heart is transplanted into his older brother Armaan, who is the first born of KB. She also learns that her first born and Mahira's offspring can actually bring back her evil powers.

Though, they are initially at loggerheads as Armaan fakes his love for Mahira to take the revenge of her slaps, they are married as he blackmails her. Both Mahira and Armaan try to trouble and outsmart each other after the marriage but soon falls for each other after she saves him from terrorists. Amaad returns their lives and manipulates Armaan into divorcing Mahira. Khan Begum finally realizes her mistakes and is now powerless. She sacrifices herself to revive Armaan. In the end, Mahira and Armaan gets married again and name their daughter, Zoya, ending Qubool Hai.

== Cast ==
=== Main ===
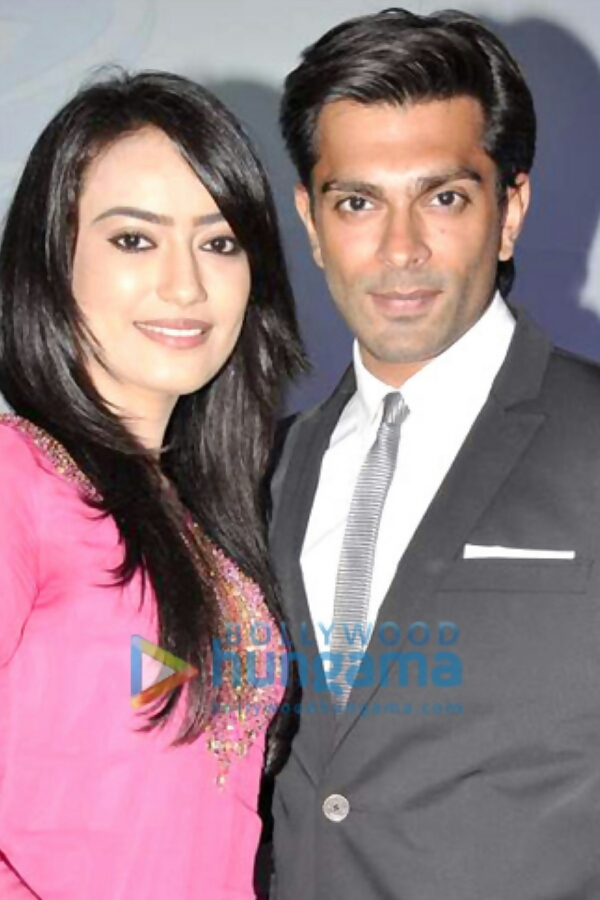
Surbhi Jyoti and Karan Singh Grover in an event

- Surbhi Jyoti as
  - Zoya Farooqui Ahmed Khan – Ghafoor's daughter; Humaira's half-sister; Haider's cousin; Asad's wife; Sanam and Seher's mother (2012–2014)
    - Harshaali Malhotra as Child Zoya Farooqui (2012)
  - Sanam Ahmed Khan Raza Ibrahim – Zoya and Asad's daughter; Seher's twin sister; Aahil's wife; Rehan and Shaad's friend (2014–2015)
  - Seher Ahmed Khan – Zoya and Asad's daughter; Sanam's twin sister; Rehan's fiancée (2014–2015)
  - Mahira Akhtar Raza Sheikh – Reborn Sanam; Azaad and Armaan's wife; Jr. Zoya's mother (2015–2016)
- Karan Singh Grover as Asad Ahmed Khan – Dilshad and Rashid's son; Najma's brother; Ayaan, Nikhat and Nuzhat's half-brother; Zoya's husband; Sanam and Seher's father (2012–14)
  - Raqesh Bapat replaced Grover as Asad. (2014)
- Rishabh Sinha as Ayaan Ahmed Khan – Rashid and Shireen's son; Nikhat and Nuzhat's brother; Asad and Najma's half-brother; Humaira's ex-fiancé (2012–13)
  - Vikrant Massey replaced Rishabh as Ayaan. (2013)
- Ketaki Kadam as Humaira Siddiqui Sheikh – Ghafoor and Razia's daughter; Zoya's half-sister; Ayaan's ex-fiancée; Haider's wife (2012–14)
- Mohit Sehgal as Haider Sheikh – Zoya's cousin; Humaira's husband (2013–14)
- Nisha Nagpal as Tanveer Baig aka Begum Sahiba – Asad's childhood friend and lover; Zoya and Sanam's enemy; Rehan and Shashi's mother; Aahil's step-mother. (2013)
  - Amrapali Gupta
    - replaced Nagpal as Tanveer. (2013–15)
      - Suzi Khan as Child Tanveer Baig (2012)
    - as Shashi Kapoor aka Misbah Sayyed – A terrorist; Tanveer's daughter (2015)
- Alka Kaushal as Razia Ahmed Siddiqui – Ghafoor's second wife; Humaira's mother (2012–15)
- Shalini Kapoor as Dilshad Ahmed Khan – Rashid's first wife; Asad and Najma's mother (2012–14)

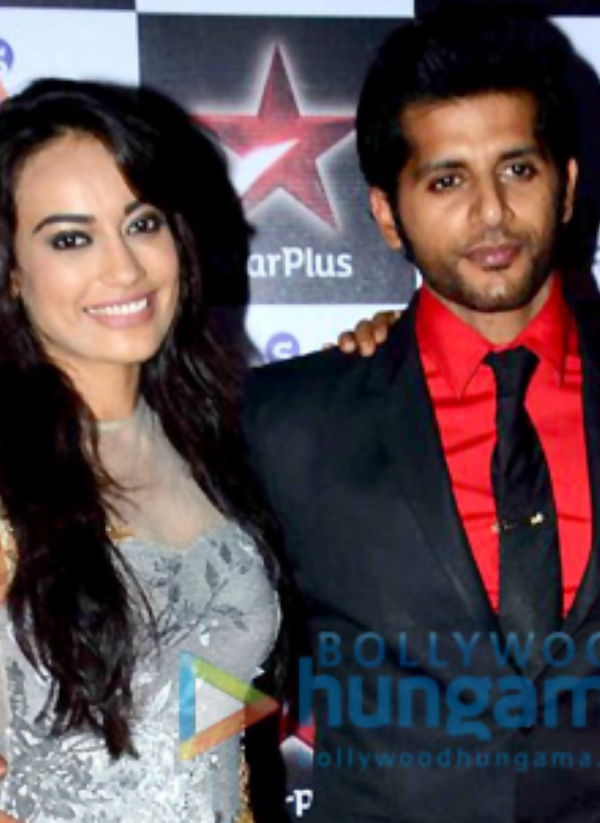
Surbhi Jyoti and Karanvir Bohra in an event

- Karanvir Bohra as
  - Aahil Raza Ibrahim – Nawab's son; Tanveer's step-son; Shazia and Nazia's brother; Sanam's husband (2014–15)
  - Sahil Qureshi – Nawab Of Bhopal (2015)
- Shehzad Shaikh as Rehan Qureshi – Tanveer's son; Seher's fiancée (2014–15)
- Surbhi Chandna as Haya Qureshi Ansari – Najma and Imran's daughter; Raahat's wife (2014–2015)
- Deepak Wadhwa as Raahat Ansari – Haya's husband (2014–2015)
- Additi Gupta as Khan Begum – Sanam's impostor; Naseer, Aahil and Ahsaan's wife; Azaad, Kainaat, Armaan, and Amaad's mother; Aahil's murderer (2014–16)
- Varun Toorkey as Shaad Aftaab Khan – Sanam's friend and saviour in Pakistan (2015)
- Avinash Sachdev as Armaan Raza Sheikh – Khan Begum's illegitimate son; Azaad, Kainaat and Amaad's half-brother; Mahira's second husband; Jr. Zoya's father (2015–2016)
- Rajbeer Singh as Azaad Iqbal Khan – Khan Begum and Naseer's son; Kainaat and Amaad's brother; Armaan's half-brother; Mahira's first husband
- Ankit Raaj as Amaad Iqbal Khan / Munna Rangila – Khan Begum and Naseer Khan's son; Azaad and Kainaat's brother; Armaan's half-brother; Mahira's obsessive lover (2015–2016)
- Puja Banerjee as Aafreen – A witch; Azaad's ex-wife (2015)
- Nitin Sahrawat as Star Anand Kumar / Naseer Khan – Khan Begum's husband; Azaad, Kainaat and Amaad's father (2015)

=== Recurring ===
- Vidya Sinha as Badi Bi – Rashid's mother; Asad, Ayaan, Najma, Nikhat and Nuzhat's grandmother (2012–2014)
- Vaquar Shaikh as Rashid Ahmed Khan – Dilshad and Shireen's husband; Asad, Ayaan, Najma, Nikhat, Nuzhat's father (2012–2014)
- Tej Sapru as Ghafoor Ahmed Siddiqui – Razia's husband; Zoya and Humaira's father (2012–2014)
- Surabhi Vanzara as Shireen Ahmed Khan – Rashid's second wife; Ayaan, Nikhat, and Nuzhat's mother (2012–2014)
- Archana Taide as Nikhat Ahmed Khan / Qureshi – Rashid and Shireen's daughter; Ayaan and Nuzhat's sister; Asad and Najma's half-sister; Farhan's ex-wife (2012–2014)
- Nehalaxmi Iyer as Najma Ahmed Khan / Qureshi – Dilshad and Rashid's daughter; Asad's sister; Ayaan, Nikhat and Nuzhat's half-sister; Imran's wife (2012–2014)
- Shweta Kanoje as Chief Dayan (Who Ruled) (2015–2016)
- Digangana Suryavanshi / Farhina Jarimari as Nuzhat Ahmed Khan – Rashid and Shireen's younger daughter; Ayaan and Nikhat's sister; Asad and Najma's half-sister (2012–2014)
- Vikram Singh Chauhan as Imraan Qureshi – Najma's husband (2013–2014)
- Vishal Nayak as Farhaan Qureshi – Sameera and Nikhat's ex-husband (2013–2014)
- Nishi Singh as Haseena Bi – Imran and Farhan's abusive mother (2012–2014)
- Sunayana Fozdar as Sameera Qureshi – Farhan's first wife (2012–2014)
- Sangeeta Kapure as Zeenat Farooqui – Zoya's foster sister; Anwar's wife (2012–2014)
- Harsh Vashisht as Anwar Farooqui – Zeenat's husband (2012–2014)
- Melanie Nazareth as Ghazala – Tanveer's sister; Azhar's mother (2014–2016)
- Rakesh Bedi as Dhurandar Watavdekar – Immigration officer (2013)
- Juhi Aslam as Dolly – Dhurandar's assistant (2013)
- Puneet Sharma as Faiz Ansari – Raahat's brother; Haya's ex-husband (2014)
- Chahatt Khanna as Nida Beg – Aahil's best friend (2014)
- Kinjal Pandya / Kamya Choudhary as Shazia Raza Ibrahim – Nawab's daughter; Aahil and Nazia's sister (2014–2015)
- Shahina Surve / Ankita Bahuguna / Saanvi Talwar as Nazia Raza Ibrahim – Nawab's daughter; Aahil and Shazia's sister) (2014–2015)
- Kashish Vohra as Kainaat Khan (2015–2016) (Khan Begum and Naseer Khan's daughter; Sameer's wife)
- Shubhashish Jha (2015–2016) as Sameer (Afreen's brother; Kainaat's husband)
- Namik Paul (2015) / Rohan Gandotra (2015–2016) as Ahsaan (Armaan's best friend, Khan Begum's third husband)
- Divy Nidhi Sharma as Azhar – Ghazala and Razzaq's son; Asma's husband (2014)
- Himani Sharma as Dr. Asma – Azhar's wife (2014)
- Anushka Singh (2014) as Munisa – Shoaib's wife
- Peeyush Suhaaney (2014) as Shoaib (Munisa's husband)
- Paaras Madaan (2014) as Anwar Khan (Sanam's ex-fiancé)
- Sujata Vaishnav (2014) as Rozy (Seher aka Sunehri's crime partner)
- Sunil Nagar (2014) as Shishupal (Seher aka Sunehri's crime partner)
- Aashish Kaul (2015) as Nawab Raza Ibrahim – Aahil, Shazia and Nazia's father
- Niyati Joshi (2014) as Mrs. Ibrahim (Dadi) (Aahil's grandmother)
- Aakash Ahuja (2015) as Saif (Shashi Kapoor's brother, Nazia's fiancé)
- Chayan Trivedi (2014–2015) as Razzaq (Ghazala's husband)
- Deepak Dutta (2015) as Aftaab Khan (Shaad's father)
- Seema Chaudhary (2015) as Wahida (Shaad's paternal aunt)
- Tithi Raaj (2015) as Misbah Sayyed, (Wahida's daughter)
- Dolly Minhas (2015–2016) as Badi Ammi (Ahsaan's grandmother)
- Alka Mogha (2015) as Fareeda (Ahsaan's mother)
- Shivansh Kotia (2015–2016) as Imtiaz (Ahsaan's son)
- Kaivalya Chheda (2015) as Mahira's father
- Akshay Kumar (2014) as Viraat Bakshi
- Asha Negi (2014) as Purvi Deshmukh Kirloskar

== Production ==
=== Casting ===
Main cast of Qubool Hai
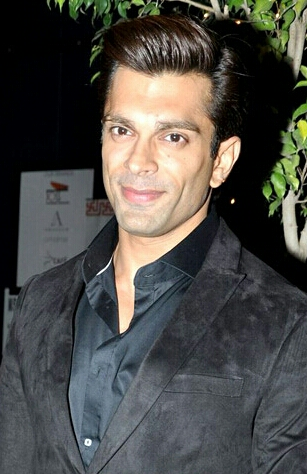
Karan Singh Grover

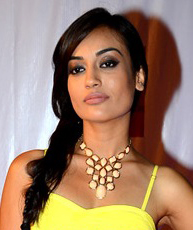
Surbhi Jyoti

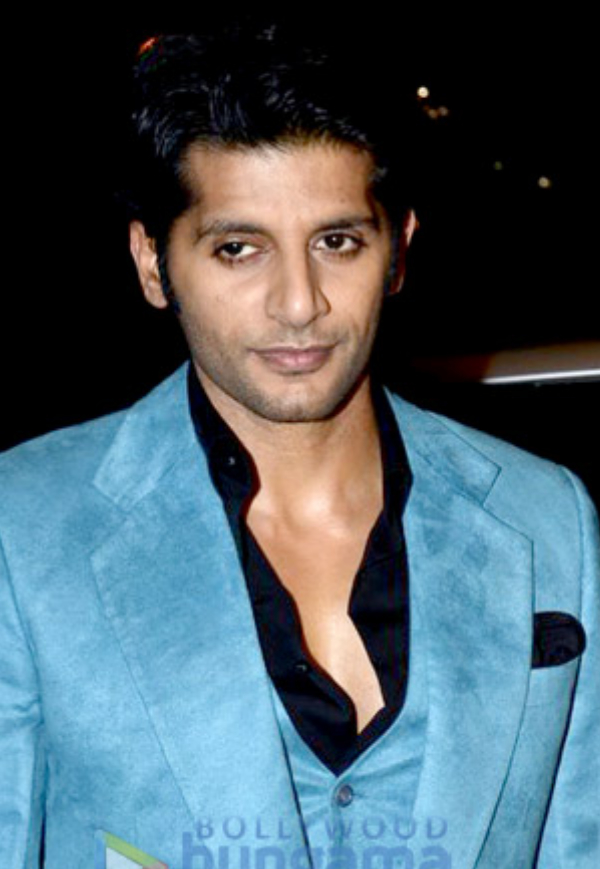
Karanvir Bohra

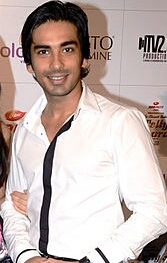
Mohit Sehgal

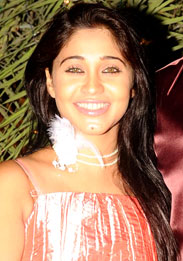
Amrapali Gupta

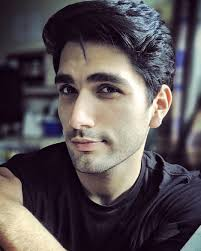
Varun Toorkey

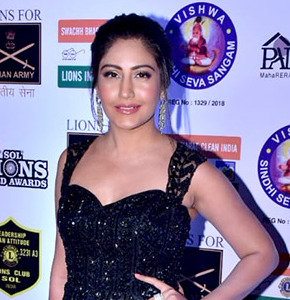
Surbhi Chandna

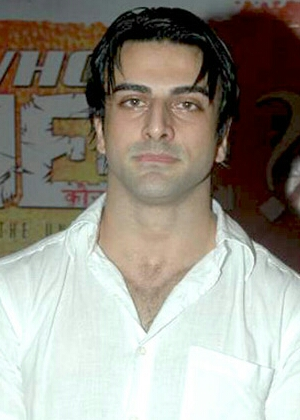
Rajbeer Singh

The show has been written and created by Mrinal Jha and directed by Gul Khan under the banner of 4 Lions Films. Karan Singh Grover was the first to sign onto the show. He made his comeback to fiction with Qubool Hai. Grover was paid Rs. 20 lakhs per month because of his "formidable female fan base." Punjabi actress Surbhi Jyoti landed in lead role opposite Karan Singh Grover in the show. Rishabh Sinha was finalised to be the second lead. In April 2013, he was replaced by Vikrant Massey due to some reasons. Nisha Nagpal entered the show as the main antagonist in November 2012. Later Nisha was replaced by Amrapali Gupta in April 2013. In November 2013, as Vikrant Massey quit the show Mohit Sehgal joined the star cast of Qubool Hai as the second lead. In January 2014, Karan Singh Grover was replaced by Raqesh Bapat as the male lead. In March 2014, the makers Qubool Hai decided to introduce a 22-year leap in the series showcasing a new generation with Karanvir Bohra in the role of Aahil Raza Ibrahim and Surbhi Jyoti as Sanam Ahmed Khan and Seher Ahmed Khan, daughters of Asad and Zoya. After the 22 year leap was introduced in the show, entire cast of the show was changed except Surbhi Jyoti and Amrapali Gupta. Consequently, Karanvir Bohra entered the show as the male lead to star alongside Surbhi Jyoti and Shehzad Shaikh as the parallel lead. Chahatt Khanna entered the show as the parallel antangonist somewhere in the end of June 2014 but soon quit the show for some health reasons. After Shalini Kapoor's and Alka Kaushal's exit from the series Additi Gupta made an entry in the show as the main antangonist. The show underwent a revamp in first week of March 2015 and Varun Toorkey was roped to star opposite Surbhi Jyoti. The makers of the show have starred 7 male actors opposite Surbhi Jyoti. In 2015, Karanvir Bohra quit the show, as he was not convinced with the show taking a 20-year leap and Harshad Arora was finalised as the new lead opposite Surbhi Jyoti. Amrapali Gupta's character was also shown getting killed, prior to the leap. However, later Arora was replaced by Rajbeer Singh as Azaad due to some creative differences as the channel thought that Arora looked young for the role. Post the leap, Surbhi Jyoti and Additi Gupta were the only faces from the former cast of the show which were retained. Jyoti played Mahira and Gupta played Nawab Begum/Khan Begum. Ankit Raj entered the show as one of the leads. Later in first week of October 2015, Pooja Bose was signed in to play the role of a witch, Afreen. In mid-October 2015, Avinash Sachdev joined the cast of the show as the 10 male lead opposite Surbhi Jyoti.

=== Shooting locations ===
Qubool Hai first aired on 29 October 2012 on Zee TV. Most of its shooting is done in Bhopal and Mumbai. The Ajmer Special Episode of the show was shot in Ajmer. A sad separation scene between Asad and Zoya in the Ajmer Special episode was shot in the sand dunes at Pushkar in Ajmer. Karan Singh Grover was mobbed by the crowd during outdoor shoots of the show, once in Bhopal, and once in Rajasthan with Surbhi Jyoti. The episode of Asad and Zoya's marriage was shot at the Taj Mahal. The McLeod Ganj Special episodes have been shot at McLeod Ganj in Himachal Pradesh. In Mcleodganj while shooting Karanvir Bohra was left stumped when he stumbled upon a group of nuns declaring themselves as his ‘ardent fan followers’.

=== Special scenes ===
The series has shot many scenes which resemble some of the scenes from Bollywood. In October 2014, Surbhi Jyoti shot a Human Bomb sequence similar to the one enacted by Tabu in Haider. In an episode of December 2014, Surbhi Jyoti performed a mujra on the song Dil Mera Muft Ka. Surbhi Jyoti's character was married 10 times. In June 2015, Karanvir Bohra and Surbhi Jyoti dressed as tribals for a scene.

== History ==
=== Controversies ===
In 2013 and in 2015 the Broadcasting Content Complaints Council required the broadcaster to run notices across the screen because of scenes of torture and excessive violence against women that were aired on the show.

In October 2013, there were rumours of Karan Singh Grover quitting the show, but Grover rubbished those rumours. However, in December 2013, the channel of the show asked Grover to leave the show citing alleged unprofessional behaviour and lack of commitment towards the show. Grover stated that he completed the length of time with the show, and has been looking to quit the show ever since his contract expired but stayed on due to his good bonding with the production house, he also stated that he was ill and that he needed time off, he further mentioned that he could file a defamation case over the statements that had been made about him. Fans protested to bring Grover back on to the show. In May 2014, Grover joined 4 Lions Films as a co-producer of the show. He came back on the sets which irked the channel. Grover's exit caused a sizeable drop in the viewership figures of the show.

In the last week of March 2015, Karanvir Bohra decided to quit the show. Karanvir said that he was not convinced with the show taking a leap in Season 3. The actor was of the opinion that the storyline was about Aahil and Sanam but the former character did not fit in the third season. Since the role was not exciting enough and the TRPs low, Karanvir chose to call it quits. Fans also started an online petition on for him to stay back at Change.org His co-star Surbhi Jyoti also requested him to stay back. There were also rumours of him being insecure about the length of his role and his male co-stars. However, later he decided to return to the show on his fans demands after making some alterations to the script. He confirmed with The Times Of India that he had a meeting with the production house and they convinced him to stay back. In July, Bohra quit the show as the production house of the show planned a 20 years leap. He confirmed that "He doesn't do replacements and leaps by policy. When they told him about the leap, he decided to step down".

=== Accidents ===
In July 2014, the sets of Qubool Hai caught fire however there was no loss of life in the fire accident. In June 2014, actress Surbhi Jyoti accidentally herself cut her wrist while shooting, in spite of the injury she continued shooting. In September 2014, a choreographer's dupatta caught fire but it was averted by actor Karanvir Bohra and the choreographer was saved. In March 2015, actress Amrapali Gupta injured herself by a fake bullet while shooting a scene where in she had to shoot her on screen uncle with a gun. In August 2015, Jyoti suffered a head injury while she was shooting on a harness. She was rushed to Dr LH Hiranandani Hospital, Powai and was saved. In spite of having six stitches on her forehead and prescribed bed rest, the actress resumed shooting as the producers did not have a bank of episodes.

=== Events and guest appearances ===
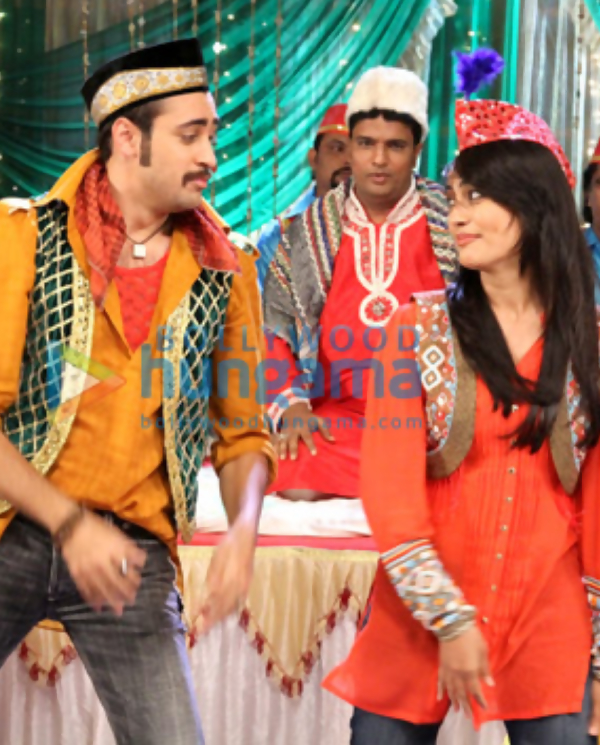
Surbhi Jyoti and Imran Khan

Eid Mubarak was a three-hour event, with music and dance performances by various actors. The contemporary lead couple of the show, Karan Singh Grover (Asad) and Surbhi Jyoti (Zoya), performed to a medley of three songs. Dawat-E-Eid was an Eid special event on the sets of Qubool Hai. At this event Parineeti Chopra and Aditya Roy Kapoor promoted their movie Dawat-E-Ishq. At this event TV Stars gave various dance performances. Karanvir Bohra (Aahil) and Surbhi Jyoti (Sanam) performed on Bollywood songs like Jumme Ki Raat Hai, Mera Naam Ishq and Main Rang Sharbaton Ka. Ravi Dubey (Siddharth) and Nia Sharma (Roshni) of Jamai Raja performed to the song Wallah Re Wallah. Sajid–Wajid the most well known music director duo also performed. Holi Bemisaal was Zee TV's three hour Holi special. Karanvir Bohra (Aahil) and Surbhi Jyoti (Sanam) danced on songs Holi Hai, Rang Barse, Holi ke Din and Aaj naa chodenge khelenge hum Holi. Zee 20 Cricket League was an event organised by Zee TV, wherein there were two cricket teams Raj Ke Challengers and Samarth Ke Daredevils. Karanvir Bohra (Aahil) was a player of the team Samarth Ke Daredevils. At 2012 Zee Rishtey Awards Karan Singh Grover (Asad), Surbhi Jyoti (Zoya) and Rishab Sinha (Ayaan) gave a dance performance on the song Disco Deewane. At 2013 awards, Karan Singh Grover (Asad) and Surbhi Jyoti (Zoya) presented a sizzling aerial act on the song Anga Laga De. At the 2014 Rishtey awards, Karanvir Bohra (Aahil) and Surbhi Jyoti (Sanam) performed on the song Shaam Gulabi. Crossover promotional events have occurred with Punar Vivah on 18 January 2013, Pavitra Rishta and Badalte Rishton Ki Dastaan on 20 May 2013, Punar Vivah - Ek Nayi Umeed and Connected Hum Tum on 11 July 2013 Khelti Hai Zindagi Aankh Micholi on 4 December 2013. In the Mahasangam episode on 11 July 2013 wherein Imran Khan promoted his movie Once Upon ay Time in Mumbai Dobaara!, the contemporary lead couple of the show, Karan Singh Grover (Asad) and Surbhi Jyoti (Zoya) presented a romantic number on the song Teri Meri. Surbhi Jyoti gave a performance with film actor, Imran Khan on the song Tayyab Ali in the episode. The Grand Finale of Dil Se Nache Indiawaale on 9 November 2014 showcased a dazzling act by the lead couple of the show, Karanvir Bohra (Aahil) & Surbhi Jyoti (Sanam). Akshay Kumar appeared on the show in a guest appearance for the promotion of his film Holiday: A Soldier Is Never Off Duty. In 2015, makers of the show arranged five Eid special episodes and named them as Rangat-E-Eid, wherein many television actors gave performances. Riteish Deshmukh and Pulkit Samrat promoted their movie Bangistan during Rangat-E-Eid.

== Reception ==
Due to Karan Singh Grover's presence, the show made a grand entry into Indian television. The Times of India wrote that "Karan Singh Grover - one of the television's hottest hunks and popular actors - is making his comeback on television after almost two years in a daily soap. And it is no mean feat for the broadcaster as they would want to give the best possible time SLOT to his show, Qubool Hai." In January 2013 The Times Of India reported that "Zee TV's Qubool Hai has inched into a comfortable No.8 slot thanks to Karan Singh Grover's charisma and also an honour killing track - both appear to have found a connect with audiences." The chemistry between the lead couple pulled in the TRPS. Around April 2013, the show became the number 2 show of Indian Television. The show also won many awards in 2013 including Best Show and Best Actor Karan Singh Grover at Indian Television Academy Awards. The Times Of India gave Karan Singh Grover credit for the high television ratings of the show. In October 2014, Kavita Awaasthi interviewed Jyoti for Hindustan Times and introduced her by stating that "Surbhi made a mark with her effervescent character of Zoya Farooqui in Qubool Hai. The story of the show may be interesting, but a large part of its success is because of her chemistry with co-star Karan Singh Grover."

In late December 2013, when Karan Singh Grover left the show Shraddha Bhandari, writing for CNN-IBN in December 2013, stated that Qubool Hai was typical of "All serials start off brilliantly with immense promise and somewhere in the middle they get lost in the maze of TRPs, cheap publicity and making what sells."Bhandari had appreciated that when the series had started, "Zoya Farooqui was a jeans wearing, very modern women, raised in the US, yet very close to her culture and roots. The story moved on with her clashes with the very orthodox, Asad Ahmed Khan and how she changed his conservative thinking and start of their love story." but stated that "the serial became lost in multitude of vamps, warring families, crude language and events that in real life are unfathomable." After Karan Singh Grover was replaced by Raqesh Vashisth as "Asad Ahmed Khan" the show received high level critical response up to the extent of Raqesh receiving hate mails. These hate mails criticised Raqesh's acting for playing Asad. This criticism upset Vashisth and lowered his morale. Grover's exit caused a sizeable drop in the viewership figures of the show. In January 2014, the show moved to the fourth position on the channel.

The Deccan Chronicle reported that, fans had predicted doom for Qubool Hai after the original lead Karan Singh Grover quit, but the show picked up again after Bohra's entry. In December 2014, Shruti Jambhekar writing for The Times of India stated that "Karanvir Bohra and Surbhi Jyoti as Aahil and Sanam in the post leap version of Qubool Hai had managed to save their show from getting the axe earlier in the year 2014. The couple have an "impressive fan following" on social networking sites." In October 2014, the show ranked 9th on the list of top 10 shows on Indian television. In December 2014, The Times Of India reported Sanam and Aahil(Saahil) to be "hit with the viewers." In May 2015 Gayatri Kolwankar writing for The Times Of India stated that Surbhi Jyoti has been the face of 'Qubool Hai' since its inception and the show is popular, and that "Surbhi and Karanvir make an ideal pair on-screen". At 2015 Zee Gold Awards, the couple were titled as the Best Onscreen Jodi. Neha Maheshwri, writing for The Times of India in July 2014, stated that the show "has failed to impress the audience." In May 2015 Zehra Kazmi writing for Hindustan Times stated that the show should end as it has nothing new to offer, which is evident with the dip of TRPS. In March 2015, when news of Karanvir Bohra quitting the show were out, fans had set up an online petition to reunite Sanam and Aahil in the show.

== Sequel ==
Qubool Hai 2.0 (transl. Accepted 2.0) is an Indian Hindi-language web series, starring Surbhi Jyoti and Karan Singh Grover. Produced by Mrinal Jha under MAJ Productions, this web series is directed by Glen Barretto and Ankush Mohla. Also, it premiered on ZEE5 on 12 March 2021. and shot in Belgrade

== Awards and nominations ==
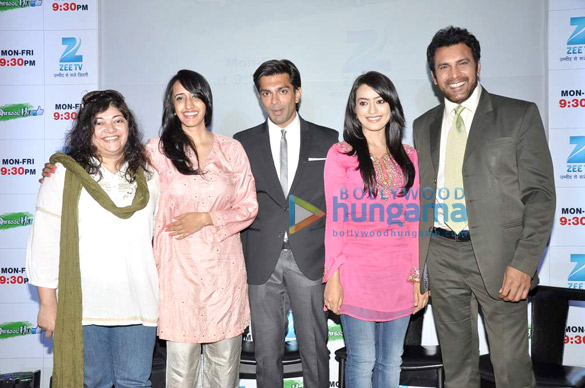
Qubool Hai Team at Press meet in 2013

| Year | Award | Category | Nominee | Result | Ref(s) |
|---|---|---|---|---|---|
| 2013 | Indian Television Academy Awards | Desh ka Dharavahik-Best Serial | 4 Lions Films | Won | |
| 2013 | Indian Television Academy Awards | Desh Ka Sitara-Best Actor Popular | Karan Singh Grover | Won | |
| 2013 | Indian Television Academy Awards | GR8! Performer of the year-Female | Surbhi Jyoti | Won | |
| 2013 | Indian Television Academy Awards | Desh Ki Dhadkan-Best Actress Popular | Surbhi Jyoti | Nominated | |
| 2013 | Indian Television Academy Awards | Best Actor Drama | Karan Singh Grover | Nominated | |
| 2013 | Indian Television Academy Awards | Best Actress in a Negative Role | Alka Kaushal | Nominated | |
| 2013 | Indian Television Academy Awards | Best Dialogues | Aparajita Sharma | Nominated | |
| 2013 | Indian Television Academy Awards | Best Tellyplay | Jainesh Ejardar | Nominated | |
| 2013 | Indian Television Academy Awards | Best Tellyplay | Faizal Akhtar | Nominated | |
| 2013 | Indian Telly Awards | TV personality of the year | Karan Singh Grover | Won | |
| 2013 | Indian Telly Awards | Daily Serial | 4 Lions Films | Nominated | |
| 2013 | Indian Telly Awards | Best Actor in a Lead Role | Karan Singh Grover | Nominated | |
| 2013 | Indian Telly Awards | Fresh New Face - Female | Surbhi Jyoti | Nominated | |
| 2013 | Indian Telly Awards | Best Onscreen Couple | Karan Singh Grover and Surbhi Jyoti | Nominated | |
| 2013 | Zee Gold Awards | Best Actor Male | Karan Singh Grover | Won | |
| 2013 | Zee Gold Awards | Best Onscreen Jodi | Karan Singh Grover and Surbhi Jyoti | Won | |
| 2013 | Zee Gold Awards | Gold Best Debut In A Lead Role-Female | Surbhi Jyoti | Won | |
| 2013 | Zee Gold Awards | Best Actor In A Supporting Role-Male | Vaquar Sheikh | Won | |
| 2013 | Zee Gold Awards | Best Television Show | 4 Lions Films | Nominated | |
| 2013 | Zee Gold Awards | Best Actor In A Supporting Role-Female | Shalini Kapoor | Nominated | |
| 2014 | Zee Gold Awards | Best Actor Female | Surbhi Jyoti | Nominated | |
| 2014 | BIG Star Entertainment Awards | Most Entertaining Actor TV - Fiction - Female | Surbhi Jyoti | Nominated | |
| 2014 | Asian Viewers Television Awards | Best Actor in a supporting role | Mohit Sehgal | Won | |
| 2012 | Zee Rishtey Awards | Favourite Bhai | Rishab Sinha | Won | |
| 2012 | Zee Rishtey Awards | Favourite Bhai | Karan Singh Grover | Won | |
| 2012 | Zee Rishtey Awards | Favourite Naya Sadasya Male | Karan Singh Grover | Won | |
| 2012 | Zee Rishtey Awards | Favourite Naya Sadasya Female | Surbhi Jyoti | Nominated | |
| 2012 | Zee Rishtey Awards | Favourite Behen | Digangana Suryavanshi | Nominated | |
| 2012 | Zee Rishtey Awards | Favourite Behen | Archana Taide | Nominated | |
| 2012 | Zee Rishtey Awards | Favourite Behen | Ketki Kadam | Nominated | |
| 2013 | Zee Rishtey Awards | Favourite Jodi | Karan Singh Grover and Surbhi Jyoti | Won | |
| 2013 | Zee Rishtey Awards | Favourite Popular Face-Female | Surbhi Jyoti | Won | |
| 2013 | Zee Rishtey Awards | Favourite Villain | Amrapali Gupta | Won | |
| 2013 | Zee Rishtey Awards | Favourite Bhai | Karan Singh Grover | Won | |
| 2013 | Zee Rishtey Awards | Favourite Bhai | Vikrant Massey | Won | |
| 2013 | Zee Rishtey Awards | Best Dialogues | Divya Sharma and Aparajita Sharma | Won | |
| 2013 | Zee Rishtey Awards | Favourite Mata-Pita | Shalini Kapoor, Vaquar Sheikh | Nominated | |
| 2013 | Zee Rishtey Awards | Favourite Saas-Sasur | Shalini Kapoor, Vaquar Sheikh | Nominated | |
| 2013 | Zee Rishtey Awards | Favourite Behene | Archana Taide | Nominated | |
| 2013 | Zee Rishtey Awards | Favourite Behene | Neha Lakshmi Iyer | Nominated | |
| 2013 | Zee Rishtey Awards | Favourite Behene | Farhina Jarimari | Nominated | |
| 2013 | Zee Rishtey Awards | Favourite Popular Face - Male | Karan Singh Grover | Nominated | |
| 2013 | Zee Rishtey Awards | Favourite Popular Face - Male | Vikrant Massey | Nominated | |
| 2013 | Zee Rishtey Awards | Favourite Parivaar | Qubool Hai | Nominated | |
| 2013 | Zee Rishtey Awards | Favourite Beta | Karan Singh Grover | Nominated | |
| 2013 | Zee Rishtey Awards | Favourite Beta | Vikrant Massey | Nominated | |
| 2014 | Zee Rishtey Awards | Favourite Behen | Surbhi Jyoti | Won | |
| 2014 | Zee Rishtey Awards | Best Screenplay | Jainesh Ejardar and Faizal Akhtar | Won | |
| 2014 | Zee Rishtey Awards | Favourite Jodi | Karanvir Bohra and Surbhi Jyoti | Won | |
| 2014 | Zee Rishtey Awards | Favourite Popular Face-Male | Karanvir Bohra | Won | |
| 2014 | Zee Rishtey Awards | Favourite Popular Face-Female | Surbhi Jyoti | Won | |
| 2014 | Zee Rishtey Awards | Favourite Beti | Surbhi Jyoti | Won | |
| 2014 | Zee Rishtey Awards | Favourite Saas-Bahu Rishta | Surbhi Jyoti and Amrapali Gupta | Won | |
| 2014 | Zee Rishtey Awards | Favourite Khalnayak | Amrapali Gupta | Won | |
| 2014 | Zee Rishtey Awards | Favourite Nayi Jodi | Karanvir Bohra and Surbhi Jyoti | Won | |
| 2014 | Zee Rishtey Awards | Best Dosti | Surbhi Jyoti and Nirmal Soni | Won | |
| 2015 | Zee Gold Awards | Best Onscreen Jodi | Surbhi Jyoti and Karanvir Bohra | Won | |
| | Indian Telly Awards | Best Actress in a Negative Role | Additi Gupta | Nominated | |
