= Surbhi Chandna =

Indian actress (born 1989)

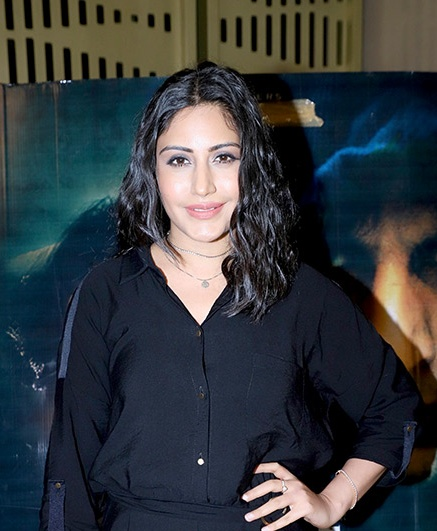
- Chandna in 2019
- Born: 11 September 1989 (age 37); Bombay, Maharashtra, India
- Occupation: Actress
- Years active: 2009–present
- Known for: Ishqbaaaz; Sanjivani; Naagin 5 Sherdil Shergill
- Spouse: Karan Sharma (m. 2024)

Surbhi Chandna (pronounced [ˈsuɾbʱi ˈt͡ʃəɳɖnaː]; born 11 September 1989) is an Indian actress who primarily works in Hindi television. Chandna is widely recognised for her portrayal of Anika Trivedi Singh Oberoi in Ishqbaaaz and Bani Sharma Singhania in Naagin 5. Both these performances earned her two ITA Award for Best Actress - Popular.

Chandna made her acting debut in 2009 with the cameo as Sweety, in Taarak Mehta Ka Ooltah Chashmah. She had her first major role in Qubool Hai as Hayaa Qureshi. She is also known for playing Dr. Ishani Arora in Sanjivani and Manmeet Shergill in Sherdil Shergill. In 2024, Chandna expanded to web shows with Amazon Mini TV's Rakshak - India's Braves.

== Early life ==
Surbhi Chandna was born on 11 September 1989 in Mumbai, Maharashtra.

== Career ==
=== Debut and early roles (2009-2015) ===
Chandna debuted on television in 2009 with a cameo in the longest-running sitcom ever, Taarak Mehta Ka Ooltah Chashmah that airs on Sony SAB as Sweety. After a break of four years, she played Suzanne in Star Plus's Ek Nanad Ki Khushiyon Ki Chaabi… Meri Bhabhi. In 2014, Chandna played Aamna Khan in the Hindi film Bobby Jasoos.

From 2014 to 2015, Chandna played the deaf and mute Haya Qureshi Ansari in Qubool Hai opposite Deepak Wadhwa. In 2015, she also played Sia in an episode of Aahat.

=== Success with Ishqbaaaz and expansion (2016–2021) ===
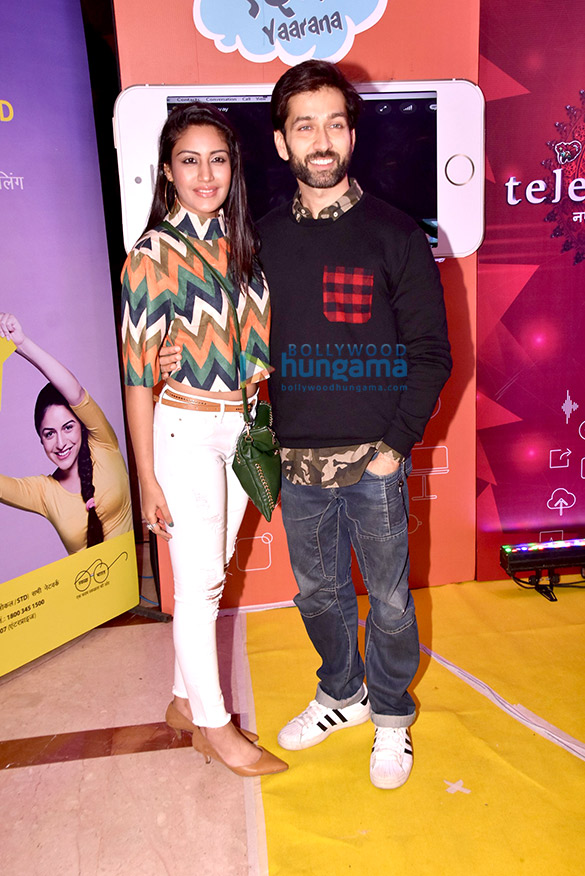
Chandna with Nakuul Mehta at an event in 2017

From 2016 to 2018, Chandna played Anika Trivedi Singh Oberoi in Ishqbaaaz opposite Nakuul Mehta. The show proved to be a major success for her and earned her recognition. For playing Anika, she won numerous accolades including ITA Award for Best Actress - Popular and her pairing with Mehta won them Gold Best Onscreen Jodi award. In 2017, she played Anika in Indian television's first spin-off series, Dil Boley Oberoi opposite Nakuul Mehta.

From 2019 to 2020, Chandna played Dr. Ishani Arora Mathur opposite Namit Khanna in Sanjivani. The series was a reboot version of the 2002 series of the same name

From 2020 to 2021, Chandna played Bani Sharma Singhania, a shape-shifting serpent in Naagin, opposite Sharad Malhotra. She won another ITA Award for Best Actress - Popular, for the show. In 2021, she appeared in her debut music videos, Bepanah Pyaar and Bepanah Ishq, alongside Sharad Malhotra.

=== Recent work: Turned producer (2022–present) ===
In 2022, Chandna debuted as a host, on Hunarbaaz replacing Bharti Singh and then she appeared in the music video, Ho Gaya Hai Pyaar alongside Arjun Bijlani. From 2022 to 2023, she played a single mother, Manmeet Shergill Yadav opposite Dheeraj Dhoopar in Sherdil Shergill.

In 2024, Chandna made her web debut with Rakshak - India's Braves: Chapter 2, playing an army officer's wife Alka Singh opposite Barun Sobti. Archika Khurana of The Times of India noted, "Surbhi Chandna is decent in her limited screen time."

In 2026, Chandna launched her own production house, Feel Good Studios and music label, Feel Good Originals with her husband Karan Sharma. They co-produced Ishk Dum Aur Idli Rasam with Ekta Kapoor's Balaji Telefilms for Balaji YouTube channel.

== Personal life ==
Chandna and entrepreneur Karan Sharma were in a relationship, since 2010. After dating for 13 years, the couple got married on 2 March 2024 in a traditional Hindu wedding ceremony in Jaipur.

== In the media ==
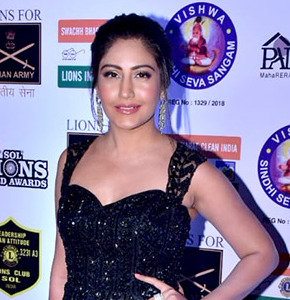
Chandna in 2019

In Times' Most Desirable Women on TV, she was placed 12th in 2018 and 4th in 2020. In UK-based newspaper Eastern Eye's list of 50 Sexiest Asian Women, she ranked 16th in 2018 and 5th in 2019. She was placed 9th in Eastern Eye's Top 50 Asian celebrities list of 2020. Manju Chandran noted: "TV took over in 2020 in a big way and small screen queen Surbhi ruled. The talented actress connected with cross-generational audiences globally, like no other Asian."

== Filmography ==
=== Films ===
| Year | Title | Role | Notes | Ref. |
|---|---|---|---|---|
| 2014 | Bobby Jasoos | Aamna Khan / Aditi | Cameo appearance | |

=== Television ===
| Year | Title | Role | Notes | Ref. |
|---|---|---|---|---|
| 2015 | Aahat | Sia | Episode 26 | |
| 2014–2015 | Qubool Hai | Haya Qureshi Ansari | | |
| 2016–2018 | Ishqbaaaz | Anika Trivedi Singh Oberoi | | |
| 2017 | Dil Boley Oberoi | Anika Trivedi Singh Oberoi | | |
| 2019–2020 | Sanjivani | Dr. Ishani Arora Mathur | | |
| 2020–2021 | Naagin 5 | Bani Sharma Singhania | | |
| 2022 | Hunarbaaz: Desh Ki Shaan | Host | Episodes 23–26 | |
| 2022–2023 | Sherdil Shergill | Manmeet Shergill Yadav | | |

==== Special appearances ====
| Year | Title | Role | Ref. |
|---|---|---|---|
| 2009 | Taarak Mehta Ka Ooltah Chashmah | Sweety | |
| 2013 | Ek Nanad Ki Khushiyon Ki Chaabi… Meri Bhabhi | Suzanne | |
| 2016 | Saath Nibhaana Saathiya | Anika Trivedi Singh Oberoi | |
| 2017 | Dil Sambhal Jaa Zara | Anika Trivedi Singh Oberoi | |
| 2017 | Yeh Rishta Kya Kehlata Hai | Anika Trivedi Singh Oberoi | |
| 2018 | Yeh Hai Mohabbatein | Anika Trivedi Singh Oberoi | |
| 2019 | Kasautii Zindagii Kay | Dr. Ishani Arora Mathur | |
| 2019 | Nach Baliye 9 | Dr. Ishani Arora Mathur | |
| 2020 | Bigg Boss 14 | Bani Sharma Singhania | |
| 2021 | Bigg Boss 14 | Bani Sharma Singhania | |
| 2021 | Kuch Toh Hai: Naagin Ek Naye Rang Mein | Bani Sharma Singhania | |
| 2021 | Bigg Boss 15 | Herself | |
| 2024 | Apollena – Sapno Ki Unchi Udann | Pallavi Sachdeva | |

=== Web series ===
| Year | Title | Role | Notes | Ref. |
|---|---|---|---|---|
| 2024 | Rakshak - India's Braves: Chapter 2 | Alka Singh | Season 2 | |
| 2026 | Ishk Dum Aur Idli Rasam | Showrunner | producer along with husband Karan Sharma | |
| 2026 | Psycho Saiyaan | Rucha Sanyal | | |

=== Music videos ===
| Year | Title | Singer(s) | Ref. |
|---|---|---|---|
| 2021 | Bepanah Pyaar | Payal Dev, Yasser Desai | |
| 2021 | Bepanah Ishq | Payal Dev, Yasser Desai | |
| 2022 | Ho Gaya Hai Pyaar | Yasser Desai | |

== Awards and nominations ==
| Year | Award | Category | Work | Result | Ref. |
|---|---|---|---|---|---|
| 2017 | Indian Television Academy Awards | Best Actress - Popular | Ishqbaaaz | Nominated | |
| 2017 | Asian Viewers Television Awards | Female Actor Of The Year | Ishqbaaaz | Won | |
| 2017 | Gold Awards | Most Fit Actor (Female) | —N/a | Nominated | |
| 2017 | Gold Awards | Best Onscreen Jodi (with Nakuul Mehta) | Ishqbaaaz | Won | |
| 2018 | Gold Awards | Best Actress in a Lead Role | Ishqbaaaz | Nominated | |
| 2018 | Gold Awards | Stellar Performance Of The Year - Female | Ishqbaaaz | Won | |
| 2018 | Indian Television Academy Awards | Best Actress - Popular | Ishqbaaaz | Won | |
| 2018 | Asian Viewers Television Awards | Female Actor Of The Year | Ishqbaaaz | Won | |
| 2019 | Gold Awards | Stylish Diva | —N/a | Won | |
| 2020 | Nickelodeon Kids Choice Awards | Favourite TV Actress | Naagin 5 | Won | |
| 2020 | Indian Television Academy Awards | Best Actress - Popular | Naagin 5 | Won | |
| 2020 | Gold Glam and Style Awards | Hot Stepper Female - TV | —N/a | Won | |
| 2021 | Iconic Gold Awards | Most Popular Actress - TV | Naagin 5 | Won | |
| 2023 | Bollywood Hungama Style Icons | Most Stylish TV Actor - Female | —N/a | Nominated | |
| 2023 | Indian Television Academy Awards | Best Actress - Comedy | Sherdil Shergill | Nominated | |

== See also ==
- List of Hindi television actresses
- List of Indian television actresses
- List of accolades received by Ishqbaaaz
