= Troy Costa =

Indian fashion designer (born 1975)

- Born: 1975 (age 49-50); Bombay, Maharashtra, India
- Occupation: Fashion designer
- Known for: Menswear label "Troy Costa"
- Website: troycosta.in

Troy Costa (born 1975) is an Indian fashion designer and owner of the eponymous "Troy Costa" menswear label, launched in 2008 after shows at the Dubai Fashion Week and the Lakme Fashion Week. Costa designed outfits for the Indian Prime Minister Narendra Modi in 2014.

== Early life ==
Costa was born in Bombay (now Mumbai) to a Goan father and a Portuguese mother. His family is Catholic.

== Career ==
Costa began his career in 2003 designing both men's and women's apparel, though he gradually shifted his focus more significantly towards menswear.

Between 2008 and 2011, Costa's menswear collections were curated for a number of fashion shows across India and the Middle East, including Dubai International Fashion Week, Lakme Fashion Week and Van Heusen Men's Week.

In 2011, Costa opened his flagship store in Khar West, Mumbai.

Through 'The Great Gatsby Collection', which showcased Troy Costa's Winter 2013 collection at Lakme Fashion Week 2013, Costa introduced a line of formal coats and suits paired with luxury cotton jeans and formal plain shirts. These were said to represent Costa's interpretation of the decadence, idealism, and quixotic charm that defined the American 1920s.

In 2014, the then-newly appointed Indian Prime Minister, Narendra Modi, appointed Costa to curate his wardrobe ahead of his first important international visit to the BRICS summit in Brazil with a subsequent US visit.

In 2015, he Costa was listed by Hindustan Times among other notable personalities in "Mumbai's Most Stylish".
