= Ishqbaaaz =

Indian romantic drama television series

- Also known as: Ishqbaaaz: Pyaar Ki Ek Dhinchak Kahaani
- Genre: Drama; Romantic comedy Mystery
- Created by: Gul Khan
- Written by: Faizal Akthar; Anand Jain; Harneet Singh; Divy Sharma; Aparajita Sharma; Mrinal Jha; Abhijit Sinha
- Directed by: Lalit Mohan
- Starring: Nakuul Mehta; Surbhi Chandna; Kunal Jaisingh; Shrenu Parikh; Leenesh Mattoo; Mansi Srivastava; Niti Taylor
- Composer: Sanjeev Srivastava
- Country of origin: India
- Original language: Hindi
- No. of seasons: 2
- No. of episodes: 758

Production
- Executive producer: Gorky M
- Producers: Gul Khan; Karishma Bhutoria
- Cinematography: Rajan Singh
- Camera setup: Multi-Camara
- Running time: 22 minutes
- Production company: 4 Lions Films

Original release
- Network: StarPlus
- Release: 27 June 2016 – 15 March 2019

Related
- Dil Boley Oberoi

Ishqbaaaz (transl. Lovers) (international title: Game of Love) is an Indian romantic drama television series that aired from 27 June 2016 to 15 March 2019 on Star Plus. It initially starred Nakuul Mehta, Surbhi Chandna, Kunal Jaisingh, Shrenu Parikh, Leenesh Mattoo and Mansi Srivastava. In December 2018, the show took a generation leap and aired a new season, Ishqbaaz: Pyaar Ki Ek Dhinchak Kahaani starring Nakuul Mehta and Niti Taylor.

== Plot ==
Kalyani Singh Oberoi, the matriarch of the family has two sons, Tej and Shakti. Tej is married to Jhanvi and they have three children, Omkara, Rudra and Priyanka. Shakti is married to Pinky and has a son, Shivaay, who is the eldest grandson.

This story is about the Oberoi brothers, Shivaay, Omkara and Rudra, friendship and romances.

Shivaay crosses paths with the self righteous Annika, who confronts him for trying to suppress the poor with the misuse money and lineage. To which, Shivaay gives her a bunch of cash. Presuming that he won the conversation, he moves to his car, only to face Annika breaking the glass of his windshield, and returning him the same bunch of cash, earning the nickname "Khidki-tod".

Surprised by the video showing all these incidents, Dadi, Omkara, and Rudra find Annika at the party they had organized for their grandfather's birthday. But Shivaay ignores her there because he has no knowledge about her bloodline or lineage.

Shivaay firmly believes that he has no time for love and hence plans to marry Tia Kapoor as a business deal. Dadi hires Anika as a wedding planner for Shivaay and Tia's upcoming wedding. At first, his relationship with Annika becomes more hostile due to misunderstandings.

After the misunderstandings are cleared, Shivaay starts to understand Annika and they develop feelings for each other. Unaware of the emotions, Shivaay still plans to marry Tia.

Daksh, Shivaay's childhood friend turns up at his door and falls for Annika at first sight, which soon turns into an obsession. Angered after being rejected twice, Daksh lies to Shivaay that Annika agreed to sleep with him for one night in exchange for money, leading Shivaay to hate her.

On Shivaay and Tia's wedding day it is revealed that she is already married to Robin. Due to turn of events Tia runs away from her wedding which leads to Shivaay forcibly marrying Annika.

Meanwhile, Omkara crosses paths with Ishana, who introduces herself as Bela to him. Ishana wanted to marry Omkara to gain all the wealth he has, and invents lies to gain his sympathy. Ishana tries to trick both of them but fails as the three Oberoi brothers try to expose her. Some time later, Riddhima lies and betrays Omkara and collaborates with his father to make Omkara the sole heir of the Oberoi empire. Disheartened, he breaks up with her.

In the meantime, Rudra has a chance encounter with the cute and sweet Soumya, who consoles him as Shivaay's life is in danger. Rudra starts to like Romi, a hot fresher and tries his best to win her. By chance, Soumya also comes to college and is happy to see a familiar face, only to be ignored by Rudra as she is a little fat and that would have reduced his reputation. Due to the turn of events, and under the influence of alcohol, Rudra and Soumya marry, which they decide to conceal and forget.

After a rocky start, Annika and Shivaay clear the misunderstandings between them and eventually fall in love. Together, they expose Tia's marriage and her mother, Mrs. Kapoor's, evil intentions. Later, Shivaay publicly accepts Annika as his wife.

Due to Priyanka's pregnancy, Shivaay fixes her wedding with a police officer, Ranveer Randhawa, who hated Priyanka as she was the reason his sister died. Kamini Khurana Randhawa, Ranveer's adoptive mother, enters. She has a past with Shivaay's father as Shakti is constantly teased by his brother about Kamini. Kamini and Ranveer have an evil plan. Meanwhile, Shivaay's doppelganger kidnaps him and takes his place in the Oberoi mansion. Suspicious, Annika discovers that he is not the real Shivaay, she rushes to find and save the real one.

Together, they expose the fake Shivaay, Mahi. Simultaneously they expose Ranveer and his foster mother, Kamini who is Shivaay's father's former girlfriend. It is revealed that Mahi is Kamini's illegitimate son with Shakti as she wants to use her son for Oberoi wealth. Afterwards, it's revealed that Priyanka is not pregnant.

Omkara marries Gauri Kumari Sharma, but hates her and the concept of love (their story is shown more in the spinoff series Dil Boley Oberoi). At a party, Rudra falls in love with Bhavya, an undercover ACP on a mission. She later uses him for her mission, Rudra and Bhavya fake a marriage just so she can hide in the Oberoi mansion.

== Cast ==
=== Main ===
- Nakuul Mehta in a double role as
  - Shivaay Singh Oberoi: Shakti and Pinky's son; Abhay's brother; Tej and Jhanvi's nephew; Omkara, Rudra and Priyanka's cousin; Kalyani's grandson; Anika's husband; Shivaansh and Shivani's father; Mannat's father-in-law
  - Shivaansh Singh Oberoi: Shivaay and Anika's son; Shivani's brother; Abhay, Omkara, Gauri, Rudra, Bhavya, Ranveer and Priyanka's nephew; Radhika and Dhruv's cousin; Shakti and Pinky's grandson; Kalyani's great-grandson; Mannat's husband
- Surbhi Chandna as Anika Singh Oberoi: Harshvardhan's daughter; Gauri's sister; Shivaay's wife; Shakti and Pinky's daughter-in-law; Abhay's sister-in-law; Shivaay's wife; Shivaansh and Shivani's mother; Mannat's mother-in-law
  - Nitanshi Goel as Child Anika Singh Oberoi
- Niti Taylor as Mannat Singh Oberoi: Shivaansh's wife; Shivaay and Anika's daughter-in-law; Shivani's sister-in-law; Shivaansh's wife
- Pal John as Shivani Singh Oberoi: Shivaay and Anika's daughter; Shivaansh's sister; Abhay, Omkara, Gauri, Rudra, Bhvya, Ranveer and Priyanka's niece; Radhika and Dhruv's cousin; Shakti and Pinky's granddaughter; Kalyani's great-granddaughter;
- Avinash Mishra as Abhay Singh Oberoi: Shakti and Pinky's son; Shivaay's brother; Tej and Jhanvi's nephew; Omkara, Rudra and Priyanka's cousin; Shivaansh, Shivani, Radhika and Dhruv's uncle; Kalyani's grandson
- Kunal Jaisingh as Omkara Singh Oberoi: Tej and Jhanvi's son; Rudra and Priyanka's brother; Shakti and Pinky's nephew; Shivaay and Abhay's cousin; Shivaansh, Shivani and Dhruv's uncle Kalyani's grandson; Gauri's husband; Radhika's father
- Shrenu Parikh as Gauri Singh Oberoi: Harshvardhan's daughter; Anika's sister; Omkara's wife; Tej and Jhanvi's daughter-in-law; Rudra and Priyanka's sister-in-law; Omkara's wife; Radhika's mother
- Sharain Khanduja as Radhika Singh Oberoi: Omkara and Gauri's daughter; Abhay, Shivaay, Anika, Rudra, Bhavya, Ranveer and Priyanka's niece; Shivaansh, Shivani and Dhruv's cousin; Tej and Jhanvi's granddaughter; Kalyani's great-granddaughter
- Leenesh Mattoo as Rudra Singh Oberoi: Tej and Jhanvi's son; Omkara and Priyanka's brother; Shakti and Pinky's nephew; Shivaay and Abhay's cousin; Shivaansh, Shivani and Radhika's uncle; Kalyani's grandson; Bhavya's husband; Dhruv's father
- Mansi Srivastava as Bhavya Singh Oberoi: Rudra's wife; Tej and Jhanvi's daughter-in-law; Omkara and Priyanka's sister-in-law; Rudra's wife; Dhruv's mother
- Abhishek Singh Pathania as Dhruv Singh Oberoi: Rudra and Bhavya's son; Abhay, Shivaay, Anika, Omkara, Gauri, Ranveer and Priyanka's nephew; Shivaansh, Shivani and Radhika's cousin; Tej and Jhanvi's grandson; Kalyani's great-grandson
- Subha Rajput / Siddhi Karkhanis as Priyanka Singh Randhawa: Tej and Jhanvi's daughter; Omkara and Rudra's sister; Shakti and Pinky's niece; Shivaay and Abhay's cousin; Shivaansh, Shivani, Radhika and Dhruv's aunt; Kalyani's granddaughter; Ranveer's wife
- Ayush Anand as Ranveer Singh Randhawa: Police officer and former ACP; Priyanka's husband; Tej and Jhanvi's son-in-law; Omkara and Rudra's brother-in-law; Priyanka's husband

=== Recurring ===
- Navnindra Behl as Kalyani Singh Oberoi: matriarch of Oberois family; Shakti and Tej's mother; Pinky and Jhanvi's mother-in-law; Shivaay, Abhay, Omkara, Rudra and Priyanka's grandmother; Shivaansh, Shivani, Radhika and Dhruv's great-grandmother
- Siraj Mustafa Khan as Shakti Singh Oberoi: Kalyani's son; Pinky's husband; Shivaay and Abhay's father; Anvika's father-in-law; Shivaansh and Shivani's grandfather
- Nitika Anand as Pinky Singh Oberoi: Shakti's wife; Shivaay and Abhay's mother; Anvika's mother-in-law; Shivaansh and Shivani's grandmother
- Mahesh Thakur as Tej Singh Oberoi: Kalyani's son; Jhanvi's husband; Omkara, Rudra and Priyanka's father; Gauri, Bhavya and Ranveer's father-in-law; Radhika and Dhruv's grandfather
- Mrinal Deshraj as Jhanvi Singh Oberoi: Tej's wife; Omkara, Rudra and Priyanka's mother; Gauri, Bhavya and Ranveer's mother-in-law; Radhika and Dhruv's grandmother
- Nitin Bhatia as Nandi "Muthu Swami Iyer": Gauri's sworn brother
- Aryan Prajapati as Sahil Trivedi: Anika's adopted brother
- Vishavpreet Kaur / Shraddha Kaul as Roop Singh Oberoi
- Nikitin Dheer as Veer Singh Oberoi: Roop's son
- Sushmita Mukherjee as Dolly Singh Oberoi "Buamaa": Ratan's mother
- Naman Mukul as Mr. Khanna: Oberoi family's bodyguard
- Anup Ingale as Khanna Jr. - Khanna's son, Shivaansh's bodyguard and friend
- Amrapali Gupta as Kamini:
- Anisha Hinduja as Shobhana Kapoor:
- Rishika Mihani as Monali Pratap Chauhan: Veer's fake wife
- Sheeba Chaddha as Maadhuri: a police inspector
- Rahul Dev as Kaali Thakur: a landowner and don of Bareilly, Gauri's ex-fiancé
- Anjali Mukhi as Nayantara: a bar dancer, Annika's fake mother
- Shaleen Malhotra as Siddharth Vikram Rana: Vikram and Ketaki's son, Mallika's fiancé, Shivaay's business rival (2016)
- Naved Aslam as Vikram Rana: Ketaki's husband, Siddharth's father (2016)
- Manasi Salvi as Ketaki Rana: Vikram's wife, Siddharth's mother (2016)
- Aashish Kaul as Mr. Chhabra: Mrs. Chabra's husband, Dev and Reyaan's father (2016)
- Anandi Tripathi as Mrs. Chhabra: Mr. Chabra's wife, Reyaan's mother, Dev's step-mother (2016)
- Hiten Meghrajani as Reyaan Chhabra: Mr. Chabra and Mrs. Chabra's son, Dev's half-brother, Saumya's ex-boyfriend (2016)
- Ish Thakkar as Dev Chhabra: Mr. Chabra's son, Mrs. Chabra's step-son, Reyaan's half-brother, Priyanka's ex-fiancé (2016)
- TBA as Zakir: Shivaay's friend (2017)
- Zain Imam as Mohit Malhotra, Nancy's husband, Shivaay's ex-friend (2018)
- Mandana Karimi as Nancy Malhotra - Mohit's wife (2018)
- Prakhar Toshniwal as Viraj (2018)
- Kiran Janjani as Abhimanyu Raheja (2018)
- Srishty Rode as Fiza Khan (2018)
- Ankit Siwach as Farhan Khan (2018)
- Malhar Pandya as Jay Kothari: Priyanka's husband (2018)
- Veena Mehta as Kalyani's older sister (2018–2019)
- Abhishek Tewari as Nikhil: Anika's ex-fiancé (2018)
- Saransh Verma as Avi: Shivaansh's manager and friend (2018–2019)
- Supriya Pilgaonkar as Nandini Dixit: the police commissioner, Shivaansh's mother-figure (2018)
- Manisha Singh Chauhan as Asiya: Shivaansh's publicist and friend (2018–2019)

=== Guests ===
- Shivangi Joshi as Naira Singhania Goenka, to advertise wedding Sequence
- Mohena Singh as Keerti Goenka Singhania, to avertise wedding Sequence
- Arjun Bijlani as Raghav, special appearance
- Drashti Dhami as Naina, special appearance
- Barun Sobti as Advay Singh Raizada - Shivaay's close friend, a special appearance to promote his show Iss Pyaar Ko Kya Naam Doon 3 (2017)
- Kriti Sanon, Ayushmann Khurrana and Rajkummar Rao to promote their film Bareilly Ki Barfi (2017)
- Badshah as himself, a special appearance for Shivaay-Anika's Haldi ceremony (2017)
- Aakriti Sharma as Kullfi, a special appearance to promote her show Kullfi Kumarr Bajewala (2018)
- Supriya Pathak as Hansa Parekh, to promote her new show Khichdi Returns (2018)

== Production ==
On 18 June 2018, a reboot version, Ishqbaaaz: Redux, was launched with a new love story of the leads from the beginning.

=== Cancellation ===
Owing to its declining viewership ratings, it took a leap in December 2018 which starred Nakuul Mehta and Manjiri Pupala. As it failed to increase the ratings, Pupala's character was turned negative, resulting in her resignation. Eventually, Niti Taylor was hired to play Mannat Kaur Khurana. The expected ratings were not delivered and it went off air on 15 March 2019.

== Spin-off ==
Dil Boley Oberoi, premiered on 13 February 2017. The show focused on the lives of Omkara and Rudra. It is the first Indian soap to have a spin-off. On 7 July 2017, Dil Boley Oberoi ended and the storyline was merged into Ishqbaaaz. In Dil Boley Oberoi, Shrenu Parikh was introduced as Kunal Jaisingh's character's love interest.

== Soundtrack ==
Ishqbaaaz Original Sound Track

Soundtrack album by Sanjeev Srivastava
- Released: 7 August 2016
- Genres: Romance; Soundtrack
- Length: 38:38
- Language: Hindi
- Labels: Star India; Screen Journal; SoundCloud
- Producer: Gul Khan

Sanjeev Srivastava chronology
Revolver Rani (2014)	Ishqbaaaz (soundtrack) (2016)	Kullfi Kumarr Bajewala (2018)

The Ishqbaaaz soundtrack was written by Shaheen Iqbal and composed by Sanjeev Srivastava. Sanjeev Srivastava had composed the original songs and background score for the show. The original version of the album was released on 7 August 2016. "O Jaana", the theme song of the serial was performed by Pamela Jain and Bhaven Dhanak.

"O Saathiya", the theme song of Dil Boley Oberoi, the album released on 1 May 2017. Firstly, the song was made for Omkara and Ishana, but after Ishana left, the song was not used at Ishqbaaaz. When Dil Boley Oberoi aired on, the female version by Pamela Jain was released, but now it also used on this show for Omkara and Gauri, after merging with Ishqbaaaz.

Ishqbaaaz: Tracklisting
No.	Title	Artist	Length
1.	"O Jaana" (Female)	Pamela Jain	04:24
2.	"O Jaana" (Male)	Bhaven Dhanak	04:25
3.	"O Jaana" (Duet)	Bhaven Dhanak & Pamela Jain	04:23
4.	"O Jaana" (Acoustic)	Bhaven Dhanak & Pamela Jain	02:30

Dil Boley Oberoi: Tracklisting
No.	Title	Artist	Length
1.	"O Saathiya" (Female)	Pamela Jain	06:55
2.	"O Saathiya" (Male)	Bhaven Dhanak	07:00
3.	"O Saathiya" (Duet)	Bhaven Dhanak & Pamela Jain	06:58

Special: Tracklisting
No.	Title	Artist	Length
1.	"Lafzon Ka Ye Rishta Nahi" (Family Song)	Various Artists	02:00

== Adaptations ==
Language	Title	Original release	Network(s)	Last aired	Notes	Ref.
Kannada	Satyam Shivam Sundaram	7 August 2017	Star Suvarna	23 April 2020	Remake	

== Awards ==
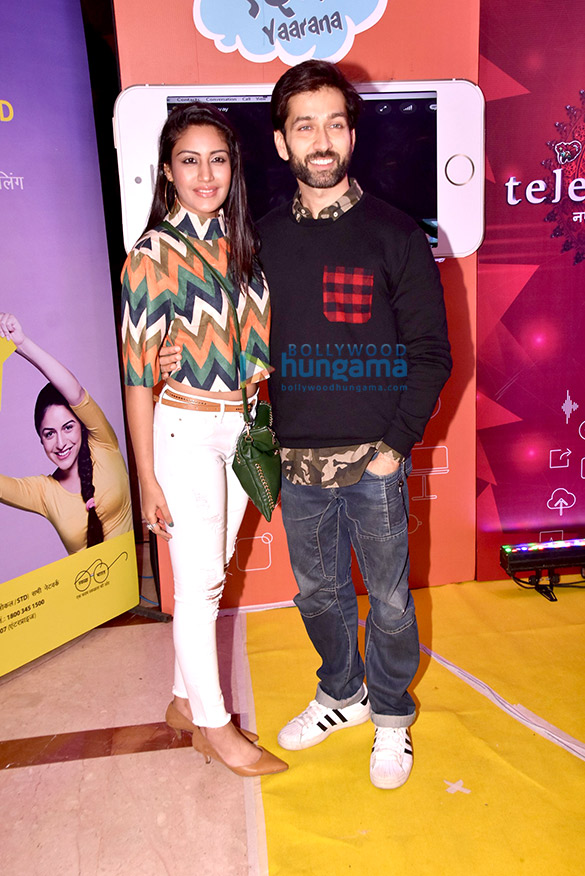
Surbhi Chandna and Nakuul Mehta who played the roles of Anika and Shivaay

=== Asian Viewers Television Awards ===
Year	Category	Recipient	Ref
2016	Best Actor	Nakuul Mehta	
2017	Best Actor	Nakuul Mehta	
2017	Best Actress	Surbhi Chandna	
2017	Soap Of The Year	4 Lions Films	
2018	Best Actress	Surbhi Chandna	
2018	Soap of the Year	4 Lions Films	

=== Gold Awards ===
Year	Category	Recipient	Ref
2017	Best Actor (Jury)	Nakuul Mehta	
2017	Best Onscreen Couple	Nakuul Mehta and Surbhi Chandna	
2018	Best Actor in a Lead Role	Nakuul Mehta	
2018	Stellar Performer of the Year (Female)	Surbhi Chandna	
2018	Best Supporting Actor	Kunal Jaisingh	

=== Kalakar Awards ===
Year	Category	Recipient	Ref
2019	Best Actor	Nakuul Mehta	

=== Indian Television Academy Awards ===
Year	Category	Recipient	Ref
2017	Best Actor - Popular	Nakuul Mehta	
2017	Best Serial - Popular	4 Lions Films	
2018	Best Actress - Popular	Surbhi Chandna	

=== Indian Telly Awards ===
Year	Category	Recipient	Ref
2019	Best Actor in a Lead Role	Nakuul Mehta	
2019	Best Actor in a Supporting Role	Kunal Jaisingh	
