= Ashnoor Kaur =

Indian actress (born 2004)

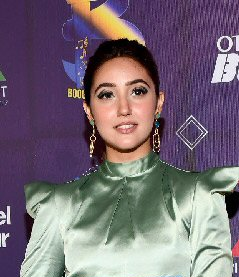
- Kaur in 2023
- Born: 3 May 2004 (age 22)
- Education: Jai Hind College
- Alma mater: Ryan International School
- Occupation: Actress
- Years active: 2009–present
- Known for: Saath Nibhaana Saathiya; Na Bole Tum Na Maine Kuch Kaha; Yeh Rishta Kya Kehlata Hai; Patiala Babes; Suman Indori; Bigg Boss 19

Ashnoor Kaur (born 3 May 2004) is an Indian actress who primarily works in Hindi television. Kaur made her acting debut in 2009 with Ek Veer Stree Ki Kahaani – Jhansi Ki Rani. Kaur is known for her roles in Saath Nibhaana Saathiya, Na Bole Tum Na Maine Kuch Kaha, Yeh Rishta Kya Kehlata Hai, Patiala Babes, Suman Indori and her participation in Bigg Boss 19. She is the recipient of an Indian Telly Award along with nominations for two ITA Awards.

== Early life ==
Kaur was born on 3 May 2004 to Gurmeet Singh and Avneet Kaur. In 2019, Kaur scored 93% in her class 10 CBSE board exams, followed by 94% in her class 12 exams in 2021. In 2025, she graduated with a Bachelor's degree in Mass Media (BMM) from Jai Hind College.

== Career ==
Kaur began her career at the age of five, portraying Prachi in the 2009 series Ek Veer Stree Ki Kahaani – Jhansi Ki Rani. In 2010, she played Panna in Saath Nibhaana Saathiya on StarPlus. She later portrayed Navika Vyas Bhatnagar in the television series Na Bole Tum Na Maine Kuch Kaha and Na Bole Tum Na Maine Kuch Kaha 2.

She then played the role of young Mayra Kapoor in Bade Achhe Lagte Hain, appeared in CID, and portrayed Ashok Sundari in the mythological series Devon Ke Dev...Mahadev. Kaur portrayed the young Naira Singhania in Yeh Rishta Kya Kehlata Hai, Dushala in Mahabharat, and Princess Vilas in Prithvi Vallabh.

Kaur appeared in Anurag Kashyap's film Manmarziyaan as Taapsee Pannu's sister.

From 2018 to 2020, she portrayed Mini Babita/Khurana in Sony TV's Patiala Babes after which she took a break. From 2024 to April 2025, she portrayed Suman Sharma in Colors TV's Suman Indori, opposite Zain Imam. The show concluded on 27 April 2025, and Kaur expressed that saying goodbye to the character was “heart-wrenching” after playing the role for over a year.

She participated as a contestant on Bigg Boss 19 in August 2025 and was evicted in November 2025, finishing in eighth place.

=== Other ventures ===
In 2026, Kaur launched an online initiative titled "Gentle On Me," a social media space aimed at promoting kindness, self‑love, and mental well‑being for her followers.

== Personal life ==
In early 2025, Kaur underwent LASIK eye surgery to correct her vision.

== Filmography ==
=== Films ===
Year	Title	Role	Notes	Ref.
2018	Sanju	Young Priya Dutt	Cameo appearance	
2018	Manmarziyaan	Kiran Bagga		
2024	Kisko Tha Pata	Shreya	Lead role	

=== Television ===
Year	Title	Role	Notes	Ref.
2009–2010	Ek Veer Stree Ki Kahaani – Jhansi Ki Rani	Prachi		
2010	Saath Nibhaana Saathiya	Panna		
2011-2012	Shobha Somnath Ki	Young Princess Shobha		
2012–2013	Na Bole Tum Na Maine Kuch Kaha	Young Navika "Nanhi" Vyas Bhatnagar		
2012	CID	Sia Khanna	Episode: "Abhijit Ka Inteqaam"	
2012	Devon Ke Dev...Mahadev	Young Ashokasundari		
2013	Bade Achhe Lagte Hain	Young Mayra Kapoor		
2013	Mahabharat	Young Dushala		
2013	Jai Jag Janani Maa Durga	Young Katyayani		
2014	The Adventures of Hatim	Maya		
2014	Tum Saath Ho Jab Apne	Najma Baig Siddiqui		
2014	Bhoot Raja Aur Ronnie	Sheena	Season 2	
2015	Siyaasat	Mumtaz Mahal		
2015–2016	Yeh Rishta Kya Kehlata Hai	Young Naira Singhania		
2017	Koi Laut Ke Aaya Hai	Young Geetanjali Shekhari		
2018	Prithvi Vallabh	Princess Vilasvati		
2018–2020	Patiala Babes	Mini Babita	Lead role	
2024–2025	Suman Indori	Suman Sharma Mittal	Lead role	
2025	Bigg Boss 19	Contestant	8th place	

=== Web series ===
Year	Title	Role	Notes	Ref.
2021	Pari Hun Main	Pari		
2024	Butterflies	Mini	Episode: "To Rishi, from Mini and Ishaan"	
2025	School Friends	Yashika Malhotra	Season 3	
2026	Jabb Zodiacs Met	Vineeta "Vini" Desai	Episode 5 - Virgo	

=== Music videos ===
Year	Title	Singer(s)	Ref.
2019	Koi Nahi	Lisa Mishra and Rupinn	
2019	Meri Galti	Ambili Menon	
2019	Swag Salamat	Shobhana Gudage	
2020	Red Yellow Suit	Karan Singh Arora and S Mukhtiar	
2020	Kya Karu	Millind Gaba and Parampara Thakur	
2020	Khidki	Papon	
2020	Mana Sakda Hai	Harish Moyal	
2020	Akhiyaan Tadpegi	Aishwarya Pandit	
2021	Yaara	Indeep Bakshi and Sumit Goswami	
2021	Tu Kya Jaane	Jyotica Tangri	
2021	Ignore	Ayush Talniya and Indeep Bakshi	
2021	Tere Noor Se	Revaansh Kohli	
2022	Yaar Ki Mehfil	Stebin Ben	
2022	Tutt Gaya	Stebin Ben	
2023	Jaana Hai Toh Jaa	Raas, Sheetal	

== Awards ==
Year	Award	Category	Work	Result	Ref.
2019	Indian Telly Awards	Next Generation Star	Patiala Babes	Won	
2020	Lions Gold Awards	Rising Star	Patiala Babes	Won	
2020	International Iconic Awards	Style Icon of India	Patiala Babes	Won	
2021	Iconic Gold Awards	Youngest Star of the Year		Won	
2022	Real Estate & Business Excellence Awards	Style Diva of the Year	Herself	Won	
2023	Boogle Bollywood Ballistic Awards	Inspiring Comeback	Herself	Won	
2025	Lions Gold Awards	Youth Inspiration Award	Herself	Won	
2025	Whos Next Influencer Awards	Youth Icon of the Year	Herself	Won	
2025	Bright Entertainment Awards	Most Graceful Actress	Herself	Won	
2025	Perfect Style Icon Awards	Audience's Favorite Actress	Herself	Won	
