= Moh Maya Money =

- Theatrical release poster
- Directed by: Munish Bhardwaj
- Written by: Munish Bhardwaj; Mansi Nirmal Jain
- Produced by: Sandeep Narula
- Starring: Ranvir Shorey; Neha Dhupia; Devendra Chauhan; Vidushi Mehra; Ashwath Bhatt
- Cinematography: Arun Varma
- Edited by: Hitesh Kumar
- Music by: Tuomas Kantelinen
- Production company: Delhi Talkies
- Release date: 25 November 2016
- Running time: 109 minutes
- Country: India
- Language: Hindi

Moh Maya Money (transl. Illusional desire for money) is a 2016 Indian Hindi-language heist film directed by Munish Bhardwaj, and starring Ranvir Shorey and Neha Dhupia. The film's production began at the NFDC Film Bazaar in 2015 where it was a Film Bazaar Recommends project. The film premiered at the New York Indian Film Festival, and has also played at the London Indian Film Festival, the Silk Screen Festival in Pittsburgh and the Chicago South Asian Film Festival, where it was selected in competition and as the Centerpiece film. The film was released in India on 25 November 2016.

== Synopsis ==
Aman (Ranvir Shorey) and Divya (Neha Dhupia) are a married couple leading a middle-class life in Delhi. Aman works for a real estate company while Divya works in a media company. Aman is fed up of being middle-class and wants to become rich and live in luxury. Therefore, he often cheats his company to make quick money. In one such deal, he borrows money from Raghuveer (Devendra Chowhan) and invests that money to book a plot of land to build a home for himself and Divya, but his boss (Sandeep Narula) gets to know of Aman cheating the company and sacks him from the job.

Divya goes to a party held by her media company and is told that she is a part of the group set to go to Hong Kong.

Divya discovers she is pregnant and calls her friend, Diksha, telling her that Aman will make her keep the baby and that she doesn't want it at all, and so she decides to get an abortion in secret. Aman then shows Divya the plot of land he has booked, but he does not reveal anything about the loss of job to her. Aman asks for his money back from who he bought it from but is refused, getting him in a fix. Raghuveer threatens Aman and even has him beaten up by his goons when he doesn’t return the money on the promised date and lets him have two more days. Divya finds out about it after seeing him at the hospital after her abortion.

Raghuveer comes to his house and threatens him again as well as his wife and gives him a week to return the money.

Aman tries to borrow money against his life insurance policy, but the insurance company refuses. It is then that Aman decides to fake his death so that his wife could claim money from the life insurance company. Divya is against the plan but finally gets sucked into it when he carries it out. While himself escaping in a stage-managed car accident, Aman ensures that the police find a charred body in his car. Divya identifies the burnt body as Aman’s. Meanwhile Aman is hiding in a remote hill station, waiting for things to calm down. In Delhi, Divya assures Raghuvir that his money will be returned to him. While Divya is in the police station to get the final paperwork done, she finds out that Aman murdered someone instead of using a dead body from a mortuary to fake that accident. She asks Aman if it's true. Aman refuses this but is nervous about how things are unfolding, so he decides to travel back to his home. While purchasing a ticket, he gets in a roadside quarrel with a lady who takes him to police, but Aman manages to escape. As Aman returns to his home, he finds out that Divya is having an affair with her boss and she did an abortion, but the baby was not his. He then kills her boss and walks away, but Divya kills him too.

== Cast ==
- Ranvir Shorey as Aman Mehra
- Neha Dhupia as Divya Mehra, Aman’s wife
- Devendra Chauhan as Raghuveer Singh
- Vidushi Mehra as Bhavna
- Ashwath Bhatt
- Hanif Memon as Nikhil
- Priya Tandon as Jiya
- Siddharth Bharadwaj as Malik (Property Dealer)
- Pratik Asnani

== Soundtrack ==
Promo song (Moh Maya Money) is composed and sung by Harpreet Singh. The lyrics are by Varun Grover. Background music by Tuomas Kantelinen and Sound Design and Recording by Resul Pookutty, Bibin Dev

== Critical reception ==
Shubhra Gupta of The Indian Express rated the film 2 out of 5 stars and said, "Shorey is good as usual, nailing the desperation of the kind of person who feels entitled to grab what he can because that’s what he sees everyone doing. Dhupia has a strong track too. But some performances are inept. And the climax, as well as the lead-up to it, is a stretch."

Reza Noorani of The Times of India rated the film 3 out of 5 stars and said, "Although it's a well made crime thriller, there are a few loose ends which could have been tied up well. The effect is that the end leaves you wanting more."
