= Shivangi Joshi =

Indian television actress (born 1998)

- Joshi in 2026
- Born: 18 May 1998 (age 28); Pune, Maharashtra, India
- Occupation: Actress
- Years active: 2013–present
- Known for: Yeh Rishta Kya Kehlata Hai; Khatron Ke Khiladi 12
- Awards: Full list

Shivangi Joshi (pronounced [ʃɪˈʋaːŋɡi ˈd͡ʒoːʃi]; born 18 May 1998) is an Indian actress known for her work on Hindi television. She is one of the highest-paid Indian television actresses. Joshi is a recipient of several accolades including an Indian Television Academy Award, an Indian Telly Award and three Gold Awards. She also participated in Lock Upp 2.

Joshi began her television career with a cameo appearance in Parvarrish – Kuchh Khattee Kuchh Meethi and later made her full-fledged acting debut in 2013 with Khelti Hai Zindagi Aankh Micholi as Trisha. Later she portrayed Aayat Haider in Beintehaa (2013) and Poonam Thakur in Begusarai (2015–2016), before gaining further recognition for her performance as Naira Singhania Goenka in Yeh Rishta Kya Kehlata Hai (2016–2021), which earned her a ITA Award for Best Actress - Popular. She then portrayed Anandi Chaturvedi in Balika Vadhu 2 (2021–2022), Aradhana Sahni in Barsatein – Mausam Pyaar Ka (2023–2024) and Bhagyashree in Bade Achhe Lagte Hain 4 (2025).

== Early life ==
Joshi was born in Pune, Maharashtra into a Hindu family. She attended school in Dehradun and obtained a Bachelor of Arts degree. She is a professionally trained Kathak dancer.

== Career ==
=== Early roles and establishment (2013–2021) ===
After coming to Mumbai to audition for the show Anamika, Joshi gave a screen test for Junior Shaktimaan at Mukesh Khanna's office, was later informed of her selection after returning to her hometown, but the show ultimately never happened. She eventually made her first television appearance with a cameo role in Parvarrish – Kuchh Khattee Kuchh Meethi and later made her acting debut in 2013 with Zee TV's Khelti Hai Zindagi Aankh Micholi. Subsequently, she went on to play Aayat Haider in Beintehaa. Later, she did a brief appearance as Vishy in Bindass's Love by Chance opposite Ayush Mehra. In 2015, she began portraying Poonam Thakur in &TV's Begusarai opposite Vishal Aditya Singh. The show proved to be a turning point in her career. Gayatri Kolwankar of Times of India noted, that her screen presence is "easy and fresh and natural". Her performance as Poonam earned her a nomination at Indian Telly Award for Fresh New Face - Female. In 2016, she first appeared as Meera in Season 4 of Yeh Hai Aashiqui opposite Ravjeet Singh and then as Jyoti in Pyaar Tune Kya Kiya opposite Shagun Pandey.

In 2016, she began portraying Naira Singhania Goenka in StarPlus's Yeh Rishta Kya Kehlata Hai. For her role as Naira, Joshi received numerous accolades and nominations including the ITA Award for Best Actress Popular, Gold Award for Best Actress in a Lead Role, Iconic Gold Award for Popular Choice and Kalakar Award for Best Actress. In January 2021, her character was killed off, but Joshi continued to be part of the show, portraying a look-alike character, Sirat Shekhawat Goenka.

In 2020, she portrayed Geetanjali in the short film Love X Society, which was set to premier in the Cannes Film Festival; however, due to the COVID-19 pandemic, the film did not premiere and was later released on MX Player. From 2021 to 2022, she appeared as Anandi Bhujaariya in Colors TV's Balika Vadhu 2 opposite Randeep Rai.

=== Further work (2022–present) ===
In 2022, she participated in the stunt-based reality TV show Fear Factor: Khatron Ke Khiladi 12, which was filmed in Cape Town and finished at 12th place. In February 2023, she was seen in Jab We Matched as Prachi. In March, she made a brief appearance in Bekaboo as Rajpari Devlekha opposite Zain Imam. From July 2023, she portrayed Aradhana Sahni opposite Kushal Tandon and Simba Nagpal in Sony Entertainment Television's Barsatein – Mausam Pyaar Ka until the show went off-air in February 2024. Prachi Arya of India Today noted, "Joshi delivers a compelling performance, showcasing her versatility as an actress. Her on-screen chemistry with Tandon is electric." Sukarna Mondal of Times of India stated, "Kushal and Shivangi's pairing looks crackling. And Shivangi plays her role perfectly as a journalist." Joshi received ITA Award for Best Actress Popular and Best Actress Jury nominations for her performance.

In November 2024, she portrayed Dr. Sanjh Arora in a medical drama called Heartbeats. A reviewer for ABP News noted, "The show is a Fresh And Captivating Take On Medical Student Life and also applaused Joshi's Performance in the show." In 2025, she portrayed Bhagyashree in Sony Entertainment Television's Bade Achhe Lagte Hain 4 opposite Harshad Chopda. In 2026, she participated as a contestant in Netflix's reality television series Lock Upp 2, where she finished as the first runner up.

== Personal life ==
Joshi met actor Kushal Tandon in 2023 on the sets of Barsatein – Mausam Pyaar Ka and the two later began dating. In 2025, Tandon confirmed that the two had broken up.

== Media image ==
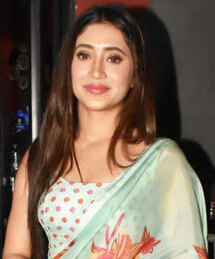
Joshi in 2023

Post Yeh Rishta Kya Kehlata Hai, Joshi has established herself among the highest-paid actresses of Hindi television. Shivani Chhabra of India Today wrote, "her radiant smile and chirpy persona, has managed to become everyone's favourite television actress, in a really short span of time". Asjad Nazir from Eastern Eye said, Joshi may still only be in her early twenties, "but she has risen to the very top of the television tree with her acting talent and ability to make a connection with audiences of all ages". Joshi is also noted for her fashion sense. According to Rediff.com, Joshi's fashion choices reflect her versatile persona - graceful yet daring, refined yet fun-loving. In 2017, for her performance as Naira, The Indian Express placed her at tenth position in its "Top 10 television actresses" list.

Between 2017 and 2019, Joshi's name appeared on Eastern Eye's list of 50 Sexiest Asian Women. In 2020, the same publication ranked her 26th in their Top 50 Asian celebrities list, and also featured her in their dynamic dozen for the decade list. In 2022, she was featured in their Top 30 under 30 Global Asian Stars list. In 2018, The Times of India ranked her the 5th Popular Actress in Television. Her name also appeared on The Times of India's 20 Most Desirable Women on Indian Television list between 2018 and 2020. In 2023, she ranked 9th in Times Now's "Popular Television Actresses" list. In 2026, she was listed in 30 Under 30 by the Indian edition of Variety.

Joshi is an endorser for several brands and products, including TRESemmé, Gionee, Cadbury, Pepsi and FoxTales. In 2024, she was named a brand ambassador for the Synthetic jewellery brand Kohira Diamonds. She is also one of the most followed Indian television actress on Instagram.

== Filmography ==
=== Films ===
Year	Title	Role	Notes	Ref.
2020	Love X Society	Geetanjali	Short film	

=== Television ===
Year	Title	Role	Notes	Ref.
2013	Khelti Hai Zindagi Aankh Micholi	Trisha		
2013	Parvarrish – Kuchh Khattee Kuchh Meethi	Unnamed	Episode 359	
2013–2014	Beintehaa	Aayat Haider		
2015–2016	Begusarai	Poonam Jadhav		
2016	Yeh Hai Aashiqui	Meera	Episode: "Bodyguard"	
2016	Pyaar Tune Kya Kiya	Jyoti		
2016–2021	Yeh Rishta Kya Kehlata Hai	Naira Singhania		
2021	Yeh Rishta Kya Kehlata Hai	Sirat Shekhawat		
2021–2022	Balika Vadhu 2	Anandi Bhujariya		
2022	Fear Factor: Khatron Ke Khiladi 12	Contestant	12th place	
2023	Bekaboo	Rajpari Devlekha	Special appearance	
2023–2024	Barsatein – Mausam Pyaar Ka	Aradhana Sahni		
2025	Bade Achhe Lagte Hain 4	Bhagyashree "Bhagya" Iyer		

=== Web series ===
Year	Title	Role	Notes	Ref.
2023	Jab We Matched	Prachi	Episode: "Sirf Ek Date"	
2024	Heartbeats	Dr. Sanjh Arora		
2026	Lock Upp 2	Contestant	1st runner-up	

== Awards and nominations ==
=== Television awards ===
Year	Award	Category	Work	Result	Ref.
2015	Indian Telly Awards	Fresh New Face Female	Begusarai	Nominated	
2017	Asian Viewers Television Awards	Female Actor of the Year	Yeh Rishta Kya Kehlata Hai	Nominated	
2017	Indian Television Academy Awards	Best Actress Drama Jury	Yeh Rishta Kya Kehlata Hai	Nominated	
2017	Gold Awards	Debut in a Lead Role Female	Yeh Rishta Kya Kehlata Hai	Won	
2018	Gold Awards	Best Onscreen Jodi	Yeh Rishta Kya Kehlata Hai	Won	
2018	Gold Awards	Best Actress in a Lead Role	Yeh Rishta Kya Kehlata Hai	Nominated	
2018	Indian Television Academy Awards	Best Actress Drama Jury	Yeh Rishta Kya Kehlata Hai	Nominated	
2018	Asiavision Awards	Best Actress Television Hindi	Yeh Rishta Kya Kehlata Hai	Won	
2019	Indian Telly Awards	Fan Favorite Actress	Yeh Rishta Kya Kehlata Hai	Nominated	
2019	Indian Telly Awards	Best Actress Jury	Yeh Rishta Kya Kehlata Hai	Nominated	
2019	Gold Awards	Best Actress in a Lead Role	Yeh Rishta Kya Kehlata Hai	Won	
2019	Asian Viewers Television Awards	Female Actor of the Year	Yeh Rishta Kya Kehlata Hai	Nominated	
2019	Indian Television Academy Awards	Best Actress Drama Popular	Yeh Rishta Kya Kehlata Hai	Won	
2019	Nickelodeon Kids' Choice Awards India	Favorite TV Actress	Yeh Rishta Kya Kehlata Hai	Nominated	
2021	Indian Television Academy Awards	Best Actress Drama Jury	Yeh Rishta Kya Kehlata Hai	Nominated	
2021	Iconic Gold Awards	Best Actress TV	Yeh Rishta Kya Kehlata Hai	Won	
2022	Iconic Gold Awards	Best Actress TV	Yeh Rishta Kya Kehlata Hai	Won	
2022	Indian Television Academy Awards	Best Actress Drama Popular	Yeh Rishta Kya Kehlata Hai	Nominated	
2022	Gold Awards	Best Actress in a Lead Role	Yeh Rishta Kya Kehlata Hai	Nominated	
2023	Indian Television Academy Awards	Best Actress Drama Popular	Barsatein	Nominated	
2023	Indian Television Academy Awards	Best Actress Drama	Barsatein	Nominated	
2023	Indian Television Academy Awards	Best Actress OTT	Jab We Matched	Nominated	
2025	Lions Gold Awards	Best Actress Popular	Bade Achhe Lagte Hain 4	Won	
2025	Indian Television Academy Awards	Best Actress Drama Popular	Bade Achhe Lagte Hain 4	Nominated	

=== Other awards ===
Year	Award	Category	Result	Ref.
2020	Gold Glam and Style Awards	Most Sought After Influencer Female	Won	
2022	Gold Glam and Style Awards	Most Fit Actress	Nominated	
2022	Gold Glam and Style Awards	Style Icon of the Year	Nominated	
2025	Indian Telly Awards	Outstanding Performer of the Year	Won	

== See also ==
- List of Indian television actresses
