= Priya Tandon =

Indian television and film actress

- Occupation: Actor
- Years active: 2015–present
- Known for: Ek Tha Raja Ek Thi Rani; Saath Nibhaana Saathiya
- Spouse: Rudra Anand (m. 2016)

Priya Tandon is an Indian television and film actress. She made her debut to Indian television with Life OK's show Baawre in which she played the role of Shaheen. She also featured in Ek Tha Raja Ek Thi Rani as Swarnalekha Lakshyaraj Singh. She plays the role of Sameera in the drama series Saath Nibhaana Saathiya. In 2016 she appeared in the Bollywood film Moh Maya Money in the role of Jiya. She had also acted in Bollywood film Wedding Anniversary.

== Personal life ==
She married Rudra Anand in 2016.

== Filmography ==
=== Films ===
- 2016: Moh Maya Money as Jiya
- 2017: Wedding Anniversary in a Cameo Role
- 2022: Dhamaka as Kripa Ved

=== Television ===
- 2015: Baawre as Shaheen
- 2015–2016: Ek Tha Raja Ek Thi Rani as Swarnalekha Lakshyaraj Singh
- 2017: Tanhaiyan as Avantika
- 2017: Saath Nibhaana Saathiya as Sameera
- 2017–2018: Naamkarann as Monica
- 2018: Papa By Chance as Kashvi Rathi (Kachvi)
- 2019–2020: Naagin: Bhagya Ka Zehreela Khel as Kanika
- 2021–2022: Vidrohi as Amba
