= Vinita Mahesh =

Indian actress

- Born: 25 August; India
- Occupation: Actress
- Spouse: Shashank Kunwar

Vinita Mahesh (also credited as Vinita Joshi Thakkar) is an Indian television actress. She is best known for portraying the role of Yamini Singh on Indian soap opera Bhatak Lena Baware that aired on Life OK, as Rajkumari Maan Kawar in Bharat Ka Veer Putra – Maharana Pratap and as protagonist Mohi on StarPlus's Mohi.

== Career ==
Thakkar's first show was Navya..Naye Dhadkan Naye Sawaal, in which she played Navya's best friend Ritika Joshi. She landed her second role in Saraswatichandra and portrayed the cousin sister of Kumud, Kumari. She played a lead role as Yamini Singh in Bhatak Lena Baware after which she has starred as the lead in Mohi.

== Personal life ==
Vinita was married to her college friend, Tejas Thakkar from the age of 20 to 22 but the couple filed for divorce due to compatibility issues. She dated and later married Shashank Kunwar in a small, private ceremony in Mumbai.

== Television ==
Year	Show	Role	Notes
2011-2012	Navya..Naye Dhadkan Naye Sawaal	Ritika Joshi	
2012	Crime Patrol	Shruti	Episodic role
2012	Savdhaan India	Vaishali	
2012	Arjun	Anjali Yadhav	Episode 34
2013	Saraswatichandra (TV series)	Kumari	
2014	Bhatak Lena Baware	Yamini Singh	
2014	Bharat Ka Veer Putra – Maharana Pratap	Rajkumari Maan Kanwar	
2014	Yeh Hai Aashiqui	Yashika	
2015-2016	Mohi	Mohi	Protagonist
2016	Yeh Hai Aashiqui	Dr. Mihika	
2016-2017	Ek Rishta Saajhedari Ka	Mala Sethiya	
2017	Mahakali- Anth hi Aarambh hai	Devi Rati	Episodic role
	Savdhaan India	Shewta	Episode 2331
	Savdhaan India	Aayushi Raheja	Episode 2303
2018	Zindagi Ke Crossroads	Jhanvi	
2020	Devi adi parashakti	Asokasundari	
