= Pyumori Mehta Ghosh =

Indian film and television actress

- Born: Pyumori Mehta; 23 November 1976 (age 49); Solapur, Maharashtra, India
- Other name: Pyumori Mehta
- Occupations: Actress in Indian Film & Television Industry
- Years active: 2002–present
- Spouse: Saptrishi Ghosh

Pyumori Mehta Ghosh is an Indian film and television actress. She has appeared in various Indian television serials and full-length Hindi feature films. In 2016, she appeared in the Hindi film Sanam Teri Kasam. She has also appeared in various television serials, including Kitani Mohabbat Hai (season 2), Naagin 2, Kumkum Bhagya and Naagin 7 She regularly features in Savdhaan India and Crime Patrol.

== Filmography ==
=== Films ===
Year	Title	Role	Notes	Ref.
2015	Urban Ladder		Short film	
2016	Sanam Teri Kasam	Arundhati Parthasaarthy		
2023	Yaariyan 2	Mrs. Cariappa, Raajlaxmi's mother		

=== Television ===
Years	Title	Role	Notes
2002	Kittie Party	Unknown	Acting Debut
2008–2009	Grihasti	Unknown	
2010–2011	Tere Liye	Unknown	
2010–2011	Kitni Mohabbat Hai 2	Amrit Ahluwalia	
2011–2012	Ek Nayi Chhoti Si Zindagi	Arjun's mother	
2011	Looteri Dulhan	Unknown	
2012	Iss Pyaar Ko Kya Naam Doon?	Garima Gupta	
2013–2014	Ek Ghar Banaunga	Vandana Nath	
2014	Uttaran	Divya Jogi Thakur	
2015	Hello Pratibha	Unknown	
2015	Reporters	Mrs. Kashyap	
2014–2015	Tum Aise Hi Rehna	Unknown	
2015	Savdhaan India	Guest	One Episode
2016	Crime Patrol	Guest	One Episode
2016–2017	Naagin 2	Nidhi Manav Nikunj	
2017	Kundali Bhagya	Kareena Luthra	
2020	Naati Pinky Ki Lambi Love Story	Nalini Ram Kashyap	
2020–2021	Shaurya Aur Anokhi Ki Kahani	Rama Ramesh Bhalla	
2020–2021	Nath – Zewar Ya Zanjeer	Janki Avtaar Singh Thakur	
2023	Sapnon Ki Chhalaang	Vrinda Saxena	
2023–2025	Kumkum Bhagya	Harleen Malhotra	
2025	Bade Achhe Lagte Hain 4	Padma Iyer	
2025–2026	Itti Si Khushi	Urvashi Verma	
2025–2026	Naagin 7	Shalini	
2026–present	Tu Hi Re Dil Mein	Sarita	
