= Aangan – Aapno Kaa =

Indian television series

- Genre: Drama
- Based on: Kanyadaan
- Directed by: Mahim Joshi
- Starring: See below
- Country of origin: India
- Original language: Hindi
- No. of seasons: 1
- No. of episodes: 156

Production
- Producers: Pradeep Kumar; Rajesh Ram Singh; Pia Bajpiee; Shaika Parween
- Camera setup: Multi camera
- Running time: 20-23 minutes
- Production companies: Cockcrow & Shaika Entertainment

Original release
- Network: Sony SAB
- Release: 11 December 2023 – 8 June 2024

Aangan – Aapno Kaa (transl. Our Courtyard) is an Indian Hindi-language drama television series that aired from 11 December 2023 to 8 June 2024 on Sony SAB. It is an adaptation of the Sun Bangla's series Kanyadaan, and is also inspired from the Sun TV's Tamil series Metti Oli.

== Cast ==
=== Main ===
- Ayushi Khurana as Pallavi "Pallu" Sharma Awasthi: Aastha and Jaydev's youngest daughter; Deepika and Tanvi's sister; Akash's wife (2023–2024)
  - Trisha Sarda as Child Pallavi "Pallu" Sharma (2023)
- Samar Vermani as Akash Awasthi: Aparna and Suresh's son; Pallavi's husband (2023–2024)
- Mahesh Thakur as Jaydev "Jay" Sharma: Aastha's widower; Deepika, Tanvi and Pallavi's father; Rahul and Vanya's grandfather (2023–2024)
- Aditi Rathore as Tanvi "Tanu" Sharma Tripathi: Aastha and Jaydev's second daughter; Deepika and Pallavi's sister; Rakesh's wife; Rahul's mother (2023–2024)
  - Mishika Popat as Child Tanvi "Tanu" Sharma (2023)
- Neetha Shetty as Deepika "Deepu" Sharma Mehta: Aastha and Jaydev's eldest daughter; Tanvi and Pallavi's sister; Varun's wife; Vanya's mother (2023–2024)
  - Mannat Mishra as Deepika "Deepu" Sharma (2023)

=== Recurring ===
- Waseem Mushtaq as Varun Mehta: Manohar's son; Deepika's husband; Vanya's father (2023–2024)
- Shahab Khan as Manohar Yadav: Varun's father; Vanya's grandfather (2024)
- Yash Pandit as Rakesh Tripathi: Rekha's son; Tanvi's husband; Rahul's father (2023–2024)
- Dolly Minhas as Rekha Tripathi: Rakesh's mother; Rahul's grandmother (2023–2024)
- Darsh Agarwal as Rahul Tripathi: Tanvi and Rakesh's son (2023–2024)
- Sonali Naik as Kusum Awasthi: Subhash's wife; Ravi's mother; Rinku's grandmother (2023–2024)
- Vinayak Bhave as Subhash Awasthi: Suresh's brother; Kusum's husband; Ravi's father; Rinku's grandfather (2023–2024)
- Kashish Duggal as Aparna Awasthi: Suresh's wife; Akash's mother (2023–2024)
- Sagar Saini as Suresh Awasthi: Subhash's brother; Aparna's husband; Akash's father (2023–2024)
- Ankit Gulati as Ravi Awasthi: Kusum and Subhash's son; Sandhya's husband; Rinku's father (2023–2024)
- Ambica Sony as Sandhya Awasthi: Ravi's wife; Rinku's mother (2023–2024)
- Pratyaksh BS as Rinku Awasthi: Sandhya and Ravi's son (2023–2024)
- Ramnitu Chaudhary as Janvi: Rakesh's college friend turned lover (2024)
- Priyanshi Raghuwanshi as Ruchi: Pallavi's friend (2023–2024)
- Shivam Singh as Monty: Pallavi's friend (2023–2024)
- Ashwin Kaushal as Pappi Mehra: Pallavi's rival (2024)
- Neeva Malik as Constable Neetu Bhullar (2024)
- Omkar Kapoor as Siddhanth: Pallavi's ex–fiance (2024)
- Bharat Bhatia as Gabru: A Superstar Singer (2024)
- Rahul Ramchandani as Vishesh Singh (2024)
- Shashank Shekhar Shrivastava as Pradeep Singh (2024)
- Himmat Mav as Mayank (2024)
- Aman Chauhan as golu(2024)

=== Cameo appearance ===
- Suhasi Dhami as Aastha Sharma: Jaydev's wife; Deepika, Tanvi and Pallavi's mother; Rahul and Vanya's grandmother (2023; voiceovers)

== Production ==
Ayushi Khurana, Aditi Rathore and Neetha Shetty were cast as the three sisters. The series marks Rathore's return to television after two years. Mahesh Thakur was cast as their father. Samar Vermani was cast as the lead opposite Khurana.

== Reception ==
The Times of India said, "Aangan Aapno Kaa showcases constant challenges and day-to-day struggles a woman faces in their lives, how they often have to choose between their in-laws and paternal homes and strike a balance together."

== See also ==
- List of programmes broadcast by Sony SAB
