= Tum Saath Ho Jab Apne =

- Inter-title
- Genre: Drama
- Created by: Zama Habib
- Written by: Zama Habib
- Directed by: Sidharth Sengupta
- Creative director: Snehil Dixit Mehra
- Starring: Barkha Sengupta; Ashnoor Kaur; Hasan Zaidi; Aasif Sheikh
- Opening theme: Tum Saath Ho Jab Apne
- Country of origin: India
- Original language: Hindi
- No. of seasons: 1
- No. of episodes: 100

Production
- Producers: Sunjoy Wadhwa; Comall Wadhwa
- Production location: Lucknow
- Running time: 22 minutes approx.
- Production company: Sphere Origins

Original release
- Network: Sony Pal
- Release: 1 September – 30 December 2014

Tum Saath Ho Jab Apne (English:When you're with us) is a series broadcast on Sony Pal by Sphere Origins. The concept of the show brings forward the story of a daughter who achieves her dreams against all odds and a mother who nurtures her daughters dream in the face of all possible social pressures and hurdles.

== Plot ==
Mariam is a widowed wife of Tauseef who was a badminton player. She lives with her in-laws and young daughter, Najma who is clever to play tennis and badminton like her father. Mariam helps her secretly. But, Tauseef's elder brother, Younis tries to stop it. He wants to teach badminton to his son, Waqar instead of Najma because she is a girl. However, A tennis coach named Imran comes to Mariam and Tauseef's former house as a neighbor. He is drunkard because of his daughter's untimely death. Much to Najma's surprise, He starts to work as a tennis coach at Najma's school.

Eventually, Imran notices Najma's talent and helps her to join the school team. But, Najma refuses it because of Mariam's advice. Imran makes Mariam understand Najma's talent. Mariam permits Najma to train with Imran.

Soon, Younis learns that Najma is training with Imran and warns Najma to leave sports. Mariam takes a stand for Najma and conflict arises. After that, Imran comes to control the situation but Younis argues with him. In their argument, Imran tells that he had fallen for Mariam already and he will marry her. Mariam gets shocked and her in-laws agrees to the marriage. Finally, Imran and Mariam get married.

== Cast ==
=== Main ===
- Barkha Bisht Sengupta as Mariam Baig Siddiqui – Tauseef's widow; Imran's second wife; Najma's mother
- Ashnoor Kaur as Najma Baig Siddiqui – Mariam and Tauseef's daughter; Imran's student and step-daughter
- Hasan Zaidi as Imran Siddiqui – Zeenat's ex-husband; Mariam's second husband; Mehek's father; Najma's tennis coach and step-father
- Khalid Siddiqui as Tauseef Baig – Salman's younger son; Younis's brother; Mariam's late husband; Najma's father (Dead)

=== Recurring ===
- Aasif Sheikh as Younis Baig – Salman's elder son; Tauseef's brother; Nasima's husband; Sabah, Waqar and Fiza's father
- Parul Chaudhary as Nasima Baig – Younis's wife; Sabah, Waqar and Fiza's mother
- Pallavi Gupta as Sabah Baig – Younis and Nasima's elder daughter; Waqar and Fiza's sister
- Rakshit Wahi as Waqar Baig – Younis and Nasima's son; Sabah and Fiza's brother
- Divya as Fiza Baig – Younis and Nasima's younger daughter; Sabah and Waqar's sister
- S. M. Zaheer as Salman Baig – Younis and Tauseef's father; Sabah, Waqar, Najma and Fiza's grandfather
- Amita Udgata as Rahamat Khala – Caretaker of Baig Family
- Anup Upadhyay as Jamaal – Salman's son-in-law
- Hiteeka Ruchchandran as Mehek Siddiqui – Imran and Zeenat's daughter (Dead)
- Mohit Abrol as Ayaan – Sabah's love interest
- Neeharika Roy as Saajda – Najma's friend
