= Naira Singhania Goenka =

Fictional character

- Yeh Rishta Kya Kehlata Hai character
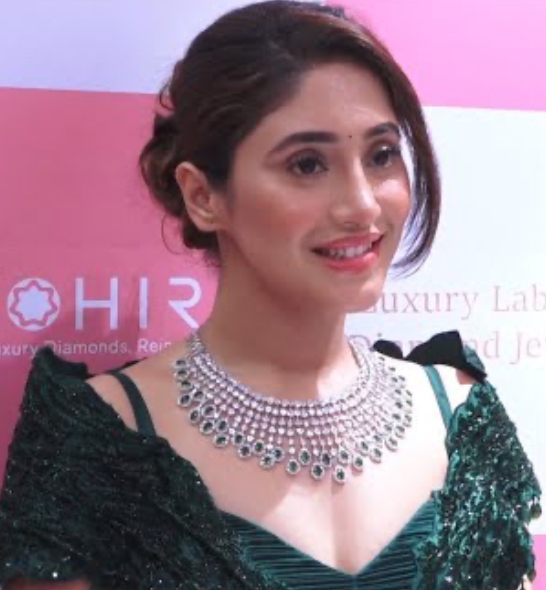
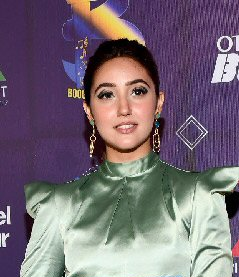
- Shivangi Joshi played the grown up while Ashnoor Kaur played young Naira
- First appearance: "Naksh Has a Baby Sister" (9 February 2015)
- Last appearance: "Naira Falls to Her Death" (11 January 2021)
- Created by: Rajan Shahi
- Portrayed by: Shivangi Joshi; Ashnoor Kaur

In-universe information
- Full name: Naira Singhania Goenka
- Nickname: Tina
- Gender: Female
- Occupation: Dancer; Jewellery designer
- Religion: Hinduism
- Origin: Udaipur, Rajasthan, India
- Affiliation: Singhanias; Maheshwaris; Goenkas

Naira Singhania is the protagonist of the second generation of the longest-running Indian television soap Yeh Rishta Kya Kehlata Hai. Created by Rajan Shahi under Director's Kut Productions, the series became a cultural phenomenon. Portrayed by Shivangi Joshi and Ashnoor Kaur, Naira is known for her outspoken and fearless nature.She is also known for her stylish wardrobe which is termed as most popular in indian television.

== Development ==
=== Concept and creation ===
Naira was introduced as the daughter of Akshara Maheshwari Singhania and Naitik Singhania. The character was created to represent a modern yet grounded young woman who navigates familial expectations, societal norms, and personal aspirations. Initially depicted as a carefree and rebellious teenager, Naira's evolution into a mature, loving daughter, wife, and mother became central to the narrative of the series. In November 2016, Hina Khan playing Akshara quit as her character became monotonous for her and she was shown killed in a car accident. While Joshi playing Naira, who entered in May 2016, turned into the central character as the story started focusing on her journey. Since then, the show has focused significantly on Naira and Kartik's love story in parallel with Naksh and Keerti who were secondary main characters of the show.

=== Casting ===
When the character of Naira Singhania was introduced, her baby years were portrayed by Mishka Jain. After the 10 year leap, Ashnoor Kaur was cast as the young Naira and played the role from 2015 to 2016. Her portrayal of Naira's innocence and rebellious streak garnered appreciation and laid the foundation for the character's popularity. Shivangi Joshi was cast as Naira in 2016 after a major leap in the storyline. Her portrayal was widely appreciated for its depth and relatability, earning her several awards and nominations. Producer Rajan Shahi stated in interviews that Shivangi's ability to connect emotionally with the audience played a key role in the success of Naira's character.

=== Impact ===
Naira was written as a multi-dimensional character, blending tradition with modernity. Tackling issues such as marital conflicts and family dynamics.

== Characterization and evolution ==
=== Fiction ===
Naira is a fearless and out-spoken girl from Udaipur. She is born as the second child of Naitik Singhania and Akshara Maheshwari. Her parents relocate to Cape Town along with her and her brother after Kaveri Singhania (Naira's grand-aunt) blames Akshara for the death of the former's husband. Ten years later, she has grown up into a vibrant girl who shares good bond with her family and is a learning Kathak dancer. She and her family move back to India as Akshara and Kaveri reconcile. She struggles to go through changes as she enters into her teenage she misunderstands Akshara when Naira is suspected to be involved in her friend's accidental death. Naira flees to Rishikesh leaving her family unaware. Seven years later, she lives in an orphanage and hates Akshara for not trusting her. Akshara finds her out and takes her back to Udaipur. Soon, they sort out their differences, while Naira and Kartik fall for each other. Akshara dies in a car accident and the story completely shifts to Naira and Kartik, who marry shortly afterwards. Naira and Kartik's married life goes through many ups and downs, testing them everytime. A misunderstanding leads them to part ways. Five years later, an accident causes Kartik to believe that Naira is dead, while she is raising her and Kartik's son Kairav in Goa. Soon, Kartik finds out the truth and they reconcile. Naira gives birth to their daughter and names her Akshara in her late mother's memory. Shortly afterwards, she dies after falling off a cliff which concludes her character. Throughout the plot, she is shown as a determined, strong and rebellious person who never compromises with her self-respect. But, her love for her family and children is always her priority.

== See also ==
- Shivangi Joshi
- Ashnoor Kaur
- Yeh Rishta Kya Kehlata Hai
