= Heartbeats (TV series) =

Indian TV series

- Release poster
- Genre: Medical drama; Romantic drama
- Written by: Alka Shukla Abhinav Vaidya Charul Prabhakar
- Directed by: Vikram Rai
- Starring: Harsh Beniwal; Shivangi Joshi; Nishant Singh Malkani
- Country of origin: India
- Original languages: Hindi and English
- No. of seasons: 1
- No. of episodes: 19

Production
- Producers: Arif Shaikh; Dhingraa Neerajh
- Production location: Mumbai
- Cinematography: Ajinkya Pandit; Rajiv Singh
- Editor: Jay Prakash Mukhiya
- Running time: 22-25 minutes

Original release
- Network: MX Player
- Release: 29 November 2024

Heartbeats: Pyaar aur Armaan (transl. Heartbeats: Love and Desires) is an Indian Hindi-language medical drama series which premiered on 29 November 2024 on MX Player. It focuses on the personal and professional lives of surgical interns. The series is written by Alka Shukla and directed by Vikram Rai. The star cast includes Harsh Beniwal and Shivangi Joshi in lead roles.

== Synopsis ==
Heartbeats is a hospital drama that follows Akshat (Harsh Beniwal) as he pursues his dream of becoming a Neurosurgeon while navigating a budding romance with Sanjh (Shivangi Joshi), a "nepo kid" from a family of doctors.

== Cast ==
- Harsh Beniwal as Akshat Yadav
- Shivangi Joshi as Saanjh Arora
- Nishant Singh Malkani as Dr. Sandeep
- Yuvraj Dua as Rishi
- Shreya Kalra as Dr. Chetna
- Tasneem Khan as Ruchi
- Anmol Kajani as Pulkit

== Production ==
The series was announced by the cast members of the show in their Social Media which consisting of nineteen episodes. Harsh Beniwal, Shivangi Joshi, Nishant Singh Malkani and Yuvraj Dua were cast to appear in the series.

The trailer of the series was released in November 2024.

== Episodes ==
No.	Title	Original release date
1	"Pehla Case, Pehla Pyaar, Pehla Siyappa"	29 November 2024
2	"Dengue and Heartache"	29 November 2024
3	"Doctorgiri vs Herogiri"	29 November 2024
4	"The Toughest Call"	29 November 2024
5	"You Look Handsome"	29 November 2024
6	"The Accidental Date"	29 November 2024
7	"Moral Compass"	29 November 2024
8	"Supply Room"	29 November 2024
9	"Confusion and Chaos"	29 November 2024
10	"Struggle Ki Aaadat"	29 November 2024
11	"Chalaang"	29 November 2024
12	"Meri Selection Ho Gai"	29 November 2024
13	"Triple Date"	29 November 2024
14	"Anxiety"	29 November 2024
15	"Time Kam Hai, Worth It Bana"	29 November 2024
16	"The Sabotage"	29 November 2024
17	"Life or Death"	29 November 2024
18	"Press Pause"	29 November 2024
19	"The Breaking Point"	29 November 2024

== Music ==
Track listing
No.	Title	Singer(s)	Length
1.	"Na Mujhko Pata"	Rito Riba, Aroob Khan	3:00
Total length:			3:00

== Reception ==
A reviewer for ABP News noted, "The show is a Fresh And Captivating Take On Medical Student Life."
