= 47 to 84 =

- Film poster
- Directed by: Rajiv Sharma
- Written by: Lally Gill
- Produced by: Babli Singh
- Starring: Neelam Sivia
- Production company: Shemaroo
- Release date: 30 May 2014
- Country: India
- Language: Punjabi

47 to 84 is an Indian Punjabi film based on a realistic story that has been shot in Punjab, Chandigarh, New Delhi and the nearby areas. This movie is about the journey of a child through the traumatic times of the India-Pakistan partition, and when her life was finally heading to normalcy, the 84 riots happened. The film is directed by Rajiv Sharma and produced by Babli Singh. The film was released on 30 May 2014.

== Awards ==
PTC Punjabi Film Awards 2015

Pending

- PTC Punjabi Film Award for Best Lyricist - Munna Dhiman for Raat
- PTC Punjabi Film Award for Best Playback Singer (Female) - Ashpreet Jugni for Hun Main Kisnu Watan Kahunga
- PTC Punjabi Film Award for Best Playback Singer (Male) - Krishna for Raat
- PTC Punjabi Film Award for Best Performance in a Negative Role - Ashish Duggal
- PTC Punjabi Film Award for Best Supporting Actress - Natasha Rana
- PTC Punjabi Film Award for Best Debut Male - Zafar Dhillon
