= Aditi Rathore =

Indian Actress (born 1993)

Aditi
- Born: 30 October 1993 (age 32); Rajasthan, India
- Occupation: Actress
- Years active: 2014–2024
- Known for: Avni Neil Khanna in Naamkarann

Aditi Rathore is an Indian actress who primarily works in Hindi Television. She is best known for potraying the lead role Avni Ayesha in Star Plus's Naamkarann and Tanvi Sharma in Aangan - Aapno Kaa both of which earned her nominations from the Indian Television Academy Awards in the category of Popular Best Actress.

== Early life ==
Rathore was born on 30 October 1993, in Jaipur into a Marwari family. She grew up in Bikaner, Rajasthan. She completed her education in Bikaner after which she moved to Mumbai to pursue a career in acting.

== Career ==
Rathore made her debut in Zee TV's Kumkum Bhagya as Rachna Mehra, wife of Akash Ajay Mehra. She then played the character of Preeti Tiwari in the soap opera Ek Duje Ki Vaaste, aired mainly on the channel Sony TV.

Rathore finally got her break by portraying the lead role Avni in the Star Plus daily soap opera Naamkarann. She entered the show after a 15-year leap, replacing Arsheen Naamdaar.

In 2021, she joined Star Plus show Aapki Nazron Ne Samjha as negative lead Dr. Charmi. After a gap of 2 years, in 2023, she joined Sony SAB show Aangan – Aapno Kaa as Tanvi "Tanu" Sharma Tripathi.

== In the media ==
Aditi Rathore was ranked 23rd in Eastern Eye's Sexiest Asian women List 2018 and 12th in Biz Asia's TV Personality List 2018.

== Filmography ==
=== Television ===
Year	Title	Role	Notes	Ref.
2014–2016	Kumkum Bhagya	Rachna Shrivastav Mehra		
2016	Ek Duje Ke Vaaste	Preeti Tiwari Malhotra		
2017–2018	Naamkarann	Avni Neil Khanna/ Ananya Verma/ Nilanjana	Lead Role	
2021	Aapki Nazron Ne Samjha	Dr. Charmi	Negative Role	
2023–2024	Aangan – Aapno Kaa	Tanvi "Tanu" Sharma Tripathi		

== Awards and nominations ==
Year	Award	Category	Work	Result	Ref.
2017	Indian Television Academy Awards	Best Actress Popular	Naamkarann	Nominated	
2018	Indian Television Academy Awards	Best Actress Popular	Naamkarann	Nominated	
2019	Indian Telly Awards	Best Onscreen Couple (with Zain Imam)	Naamkarann	Nominated	
2024	Indian Television Academy Awards	Best Actress Popular	Aangan – Aapno Kaa	Nominated	

== See also ==
- List of Indian television actresses
- List of Hindi television actresses
