= Naamkarann =

Indian drama television series that premiered on Star Plus

- Genre: Drama
- Created by: Guroudev Bhalla
- Written by: Gautham Hedge; Srinita Bhoumick; Nikita Dhond; Shipra Arora; Aayush Agrawal; Mitali Bhattacharya; Arundhati Sharma; Ishan Bajpai
- Directed by: Mahesh Bhatt; Loknath Pandey; Faheim Inamdar; Sandeep Vijay; Jafar Shaikh; Yusuf Ansari
- Starring: Aditi Rathore; Arsheen Naamdaar; Zain Imam; Barkha Sengupta; Viraf Patel; Reema Lagoo; Sayantani Ghosh; Ragini Shah
- Country of origin: India
- Original language: Hindi
- No. of seasons: 1
- No. of episodes: 463

Production
- Executive producer: Aayush Agrawal
- Producers: Guroudev Bhalla; Dhaval Gada
- Cinematography: Santosh Suryavanshi; Raj Panth; Shivankar Arora
- Editor: Sudhirr Pravin Vishwakarma Vinay Mandal Swapnil Nerukar
- Camera setup: Multi-camera
- Running time: 21 minutes
- Production companies: Dhaval and Guroudev Productions Pvt. Ltd

Original release
- Network: Star Plus
- Release: 12 September 2016 – 18 May 2018

Naamkarann (international title: naming ceremony) is an Indian drama television series which premiered 12 September 2016 on Star Plus Inspired by the 1998 Hindi-language film Zakhm, it was based on the life of filmmaker Mahesh Bhatt.

The show initially starred child actor Arsheen Naamdaar as Avni Mehta, Viraf Patel, Barkha Sengupta, Sayantani Ghosh and Reema Lagoo from September 2016 to March 2017. It then took a 15-year leap and focused on the story Avni Ayesha (Aditi Rathore) and Neil Khanna (Zain Imam). In May 2017, Ragini Shah replaced Reema Lagoo due to the latter's death. The show ended on 18 May 2018 completing 463 episodes.

== Plot ==
11-year-old Avni lives with her mother, Ayesha Haider who is a film actress. Avni's father Ashish Mehta, a film director meets them in secret because of his mother, Dayawanti, a deeply religious hindu yet a corrupt woman. The plot begins with how Ashish and Ayesha meet in Kashmir fall in love as Ashish launches Ayesha's career, she becomes a film star and later gives birth to Avni. Dayawanti hates Ayesha because of her being a Muslim and rejects Avni due to the fact that she was born out of wedlock, to this day Avni has not had her Naamkaran (Naming Ceremony) and therefore goes by the name Avni Ayesha. She creates several hurdles for Avni. Ashish is forced to marry Neela Parikh a kind hearted women, who develops a motherly bond with Avni after learning her relation with Ashish and stands up against Dayawanti.

Later, Ayesha meets with an accident and gives birth to her and Ashish's son, Aman. Dayawanti kills Ayesha in the hospital and takes Aman, framing Avni for Ayesha's death. Believing Dayawanti, Ashish gets Avni arrested. Neela bails Avni out and leaves with her, divorcing Ashish. After Avni's release, Dayawanti tricks Avni into meeting her in the woods, claiming she can see her brother Aman there. When Avni arrives, Dayawanti shoots her and runs away with Aman, renaming him Amol Mehta. Avni falls from the cliff in the sea. Neela finds Avni and saves her. Avni is presumed dead.

15 Years Later

Avni is now grown up raised by Neela under the identity of Ananya Verma. She vows revenge against Dayawanti Mehta for taking her younger brother away and determines to bring him back. Ananya steals money from wealthy people and donates it to poor patients in hospitals.

Meanwhile, ACP Neil Khanna is a police officer who is investigating her case known as "Case 123", unaware that the theif he is searching for is actually Avni. The two eventually meet at a cliff, where both accidentally fall into the sea. Neil saves Ananya, and the two find themselves stranded together on an island. Their relationship gets off to a rocky start as they constantly argue with each other.

Neela and Avni begin plotting against Dayawanti. Avni learns that her cousin Riya Mehta is getting engaged to Neil and uses this opportunity to enter the Mehta house. Dayawanti, who is struggling under the burden of heavy bank loans, arranges Riya's marriage to Neil as a business alliance with Neil's father, Prakash Khanna, hoping to escape bankruptcy. Avni befriends Riya and enters the Mehta house by introducing herself as Riya's best friend. She wins Riya's and Dayawanti's trust by her strong personality and eventually sabotages Riya and Neil's engagement by replacing the engagement bangles with fake ones.

Neil becomes suspicious of Ananya. During the Holi celebrations, Neil and Ananya gradually begin growing closer. Meanwhile, Avni's childhood best friend Ali, who has been waiting for her for fifteen years and secretly loves her, keeps their childhood promise alive by opening Chamko Cafe in her memory. Ali is also Neil's close friend who often visits his cafe. When Ali meets Ananya, she hides her identity from him.

Ananya learns that her brother Aman is returning from London. Aman, now known as Amol Mehta, has grown into a spoiled brat. He causes Neil's accident while driving under the influence of alcohol and runs away injuring him. However, Avni witnesses the accident and is shocked by seeing what Aman has become, but saves Neil. Amol kidnaps Neela to prevent Ananya from giving a statement against him. Avni eventually rescues Neela. Neil arrests Amol under accident and kidnapping charges.

Dayawanti urges Ananya to withdraw the case against Amol. Ananya agrees on the condition that she will stay in the Mehta house until Amol changes his behaviour. She enters the Mehta house which irks all the family members and they gradually turn against her. Amol continues to trouble Ananya, while Neil repeatedly protects her.

Neil deliberately grows closer to Ananya because he suspects that she is connected to Case 123. During a family celebration, Amol locks himself inside a room, and Ananya saves him. Ali realizes that Ananya is actually Avni. They both have an emotional reunion, but Ali agrees to keep her identity secret for the sake of her revenge. Meanwhile, Neil's marriage to Riya is arranged. During one of the wedding functions, the Mehtas and Neil's mother Shweta insult Ananya and question her character. Neil takes a stand for her, upsetting Riya and causing the family to question the relationship between him and Ananya. Neil later discovers a DNA report matching Ananya with Nanno (Avni's maternal grandmother) further strengthening his suspicions about Ananya being Avni and case 123.

Riya becomes confused about marrying Neil as she realizes that they don't love each other. She tries to elope, but Dayawanti threatens her. Dayawanti now on the verge of bankruptcy and having even lost the Mehta mansion, plans to leave the country with Amol. Seeing no other way to rescue her brother, Avni decides to kill Dayawanti by shooting her. However, Neela intervenes and stops Avni from becoming a criminal. To prevent Dayawanti from getting Prakash to sign the business deal papers and to protect the Khanna family, Neela replaces Riya with Avni as the bride and asks her to marry Neil. Avni refuses but reluctantly agrees for her brother Amol and marries Neil.

After discovering what has happened, an enraged Neil refuses to accept Ananya as his wife. The Khanna's are shocked after discovering the truth behind Dayawanti's business deal and Shweta burns the agreement papers. Prakash accepts Ananya as his daughter-in-law. Neil learns about Avni's traumatic childhood from Neela and discovers the injustice she suffered at Dayawanti's hands and from society. He begins developing a soft corner for her and promises Neela that he will bring Dayawanti to justice. Neil purchases the Mehta mansion at auction, forcing the Mehtas to leave the house. Neil's grandmother Bebe (Harleen Khanna) arrives and disapproves of Shweta's behaviour since Prakash had married Shweta against her wish but accepts Ananya into the family after seeing her honest and sweet nature. Neil and Avni agree to remain married only until Dayawanti is arrested. Dayawanti eventually discovers that Ananya is actually Avni whom she believed had died fifteen years ago. Avni, Neil, Neela plan to expose Dayawanti's crimes.

Avni continues to resent her father, Ashish Mehta, for blindly believing his mother and for allowing her to be arrested for Ayesha's murder. Neil gives Avni a letter written by Ashish, in which he apologizes for never giving his name to her and for not supporting her and Ayesha. Avni initially refuses to accept his apology. Dayawanti kidnaps Avni and attempts to burn her alive, but Neil rescues her. It is then revealed that fifteen years ago, Ashish had discovered Dayawanti's involvement in Ayesha's death. During a confrontation between Dayawanti and her younger son Ketan, Ashish was accidentally killed.

Avni is devastated upon learning the truth about her father's death and is about to kill Dayawanti but Neil stops her and arrests Dayawanti for her crimes. Amol eventually learns the truth about Dayawanti and realizes that Avni is his elder sister. Avni later rescues Prakash's sister Maddy from her abusive husband and chooses to remain with the Khanna family for Bebe. Riya starts plotting against Avni and reveals her truth to Shweta. Determined to separate Neil and Avni, Shweta and Riya scheme against Avni. Meanwhile, Neil investigates a dangerous criminal, Raghu Pandit, later revealed to be a woman named Ragini Pandit, also known as Guru Maa. She operates a human-trafficking racket from prison by kidnapping girls from their homes and colleges.

Neil and Avni are sent on a honeymoon together where they grow close to eachother. Ali, who has developed feelings for Avni, decides to confess his love but becomes jealous after seeing Neil and Avni's closeness. During Prakash and Shweta's wedding anniversary celebrations, Shweta discovers Avni's birth certificate and plans to reveal the truth before Bebe and the family. Unknown to Neil who is away on a mission with his team to capture Ragini Pandit, Avni is publicly humiliated, and Bebe asks her to leave after learning the circumstances of her birth. Amol and Ali, however stands up for Avni. Avni finally accepts Aman as her brother and ties a Rakhi to him.

From prison, Dayawanti conspires with Ragini Pandit to kill Neil during the Dahi Handi festival. Avni and Neela discover that a bomb has been planted inside the Dahi Handi and attempt to save Neil but he is severely injured in the explosion and is rushed into hospital where he requires an immediate liver transplant. Avni manages to arrange a suitable liver donor and facilities the organ timely transportation to the hospital using the green corridor technique, ultimately saving Neil's life. Realising the depth of Avni's devotion for Neil and the sacrifices she has made for him, Bebe regrets her earlier behaviour and apologises to Avni. It is eventually revealed that Amol has secretly been working with Dayawanti and has planned the entire bomb blast against Neil and Avni. Neil decides to leave the Khanna house with Avni protecting her self respect and dignity shocking Shweta. Deeply moved by Avni's efforts to save his life, Neil falls in love with her.

Shweta once again plot against Avni and asks her to organize the Ganesh Chaturthi celebrations. Although Neil is hurt by the circumstances, he attends the celebration for Avni. He later reveals to Avni that five years ago, during his college time he loved a woman named Juhi, whom he believed had died in an accident on Ganesh Chaturthi. It is later revealed that Juhi is actually alive and has been living under the identity of Meher. She has become a victim of Ragini Pandit's human-trafficking racket. Unaware of Juhi's past with Neil, Avni helps her. Neil eventually sees Avni with Juhi and is shocked to discover that she is alive and has been held captive by Ragini Pandit. Dayawanti and Ragini continue plotting against Neil and Avni. They eventually kidnap Ali and frame him behind the bomb blast intended to kill Neil. Avni refuses to believe this and decides to prove Ali's innocence. To rescue Ali, Juhi and free the other girls being held captive, Avni and Neil devise a plan to infiltrate Ragini Pandit's Rang Mahal. Avni falls into Dayawanti and Ragini's trap. She is kidnapped and is taken to Rang Mahal where she meets Ali. Avni is heartbroken after learning about her brother's betrayal from Dayawanti. Meanwhile Neil tells Shweta that he loves Avni and has moved on from Juhi. He urges Shweta to accept Avni as her daughter in law. On Dussehra, Neil and his police force raid Rang Mahal and rescue Avni, Juhi and Ali. Ali finally lets go of his feelings for Avni after seeing Neil and Avni's unbreakable bond and promises to remain their best friend.

Amol realizes Dayawanti's true nature and kills her by burning her alive. He is arrested for killing her. Avni becomes proud of Aman and finally forgives him for giving justice to their mother Ayesha. Ragini Pandit is also attacked and left in coma. Shweta accepts Avni as her daughter in law. Avni decides to confess her love to Neil and proposes him which he accepts. However, Juhi reveals to Neil that they have a five years old illegitimate daughter named Mishti, who is being held captive by Vidyut, Ragini Pandit's son, a ruthless, controlling and a no-nonsense businessman who hates women. Although heartbroken by the revelation, Avni decides to help Neil find his daughter. They both travel to Goa to search for Mishti and eventually rescue her from Vidyut and bring her home. Mishti grows close to Neil and Avni. Ragini later awakens from her coma and escapes from the hospital. She and Vidyut start plotting against Avni, Neil and Juhi. Juhi gets jealous by seeing the close bond between Avni and Mishti.

As Avni and Neil settle into their married life, Juhi begins creating problems between them. Under Ragini's influence, Juhi slowly starts turning against Avni and decides to separate her from Neil. She plans to marry Neil and also threatens Bebe and tries to kill her. It is eventually revealed that Mishti is Juhi and Vidyut's illegimate daughter. When Juhi was held captive in Rang Mahal she pretended to be falsely in love with Vidyut in an attempt to run away from Rang Mahal to be with Neil but couldn't do so, and their relationship resulted in Mishti's birth. Neil and Avni expose Juhi's lies and get her arrested. However, Juhi tries to escape with Mishti, but Avni finds her and Vidyut secretly shoots Juhi from behind at a cliff and makes it look like Avni shoot her. Juhi dies and falls from the cliff along with Mishti. However, the police finds only Juhi's body. Vidyut then threatens Neil, forcing him to either arrest Avni or hand her over to him as now he is obsessed with her. With all the evidence pointing towards Avni, Neil feels he has no choice but to arrest her for Juhi's murder to protect her from Vidyut. Avni tries to escape with Ali's help but Neil arrests Avni by taking off her mangalsutra and wiping the vermillion from her forhead. Avni is heartbroken, believing that Neil no longer trusts her.

6 Months Later

Avni is imprisoned and has developed resentment towards Neil for not trusting her. She learns combat skills and vows revenge against Vidyut. Neil is now an IPS officer, while Vidyut has entered politics and become MLA. Vidyut is in love with Avni and has developed an dangerous obsession with her. Neil and Neela secretly work together to expose Vidyut's illegal activities of supplying drugs and prove Avni's innocence in Juhi's murder. Meanwhile, it is revealed that Mishti is alive and is living under Vidyut's control. Inside prison, Avni plans to escape with Ali's help because she refuses to remain imprisoned for crimes she did not commit but Neil foils her every plan preventing her from breaking the law. At the same time, Neil secretly works as an undercover officer with the identity Neo, targeting Vidyut's criminal and political network.

Vidyut eventually discovers that Neo is actually Neil and he attempts to bury him alive. Avni learns of the plan, runs from the prison and saves Neil. She apologizes Neil for misunderstanding him. The two finally reconcile and decide to expose Vidyut. Ragini Pandit is transferred to the same prison where Avni is being held and she attempts to kill her inside the jail, but Neil saves her and later Ragini Pandit is sentenced to death. Neil eventually proves Avni's innocence in Juhi's murder, exposes Vidyut and rescues Mishti. Avni is released from prison and welcomed back to the family. In an emotional reunion, Neil once again adorns Avni with her mangalsutra and applies vermillion in her forhead, reaffirming the marital symbols he had taken away from her. Avni and Neil reunite but their happiness is short lived. During the night of family reunion celebration, Vidyut secretly enters the Khanna house and injects Prakash with drugs, manipulating him into attempting to kill Neil. Neela intervenes to save Neil but is shoot in the process. She dies in Avni's arms, leaving her shattered. A heartbroken Avni performs Neela's last rites. Neil promises Avni to find the culprit behind Neela's death.

Avni and Neil renew their marriage vows and finally consummate their marriage. Vidyut later reveals to Avni that Prakash had caused Neela's death while under the influence of him. He threatens Avni, by forcing her to either marry him or he will expose the truth to everyone. To protect Prakash and safeguard Neil's reputation Avni agrees to marry Vidyut. However, on the wedding day, she secretly sets the venue on fire and escapes with Mishti unaware that she is pregnant. Neil arrives to save her, but the police discover two unidentified bodies—a woman and a little girl. Everyone assumes that Avni and Mishti have died. Devastated by their deaths, Neil refuses to believe that the bodies belong to them. A helpless Avni watches Neil's emotional breakdown from a distance. Neil finds Avni's mangalsutra at the crime scene and assumes that she has left him forever. The Khanna family is shocked after learning the death of Avni and Misthti. An enraged Neil arrests Vidyut for their alleged murders and puts him behind the bars.

10 Years Later

Neil has resigned from his job as police officer due to the fact that he couldn't save Avni and is now an radio jockey. Still unable to move on from Avni, he continues to live with her memories and wears her mangalsutra in his wrist hoping for her to return. Avni has changed her name to Nilanjana in Neil's memory and lives in Kashid. She had dedicated her life for caring of illegitimate and abandoned children along with her and Neil's ten year old son Mowgli at a shelter home called Sukoon House. Mishti, now eighteen year old, has grown up under Avni's care and is renamed as Saisha. She is an aspiring singer and an ardent fan of popular actor Karan Kapoor, also known as KK. KK meets Neil and offers him to become his body double performing dangerous stunts in his place for his upcoming film. Neil initially refuses but eventually accepts the offer, after learning the risks involved in it. Believing that whenever he puts his life in danger, he will catch a glimpse of Avni and she will come to save him. However, these moments are merely a part of his imagination, stemming from his deep longing love for her. Neil's friend and fellow police officer Mitali Sharma is secretly in love with him.

During the Holi party, Avni sees Neil for the first time in ten years and becomes emotional but hides herself from him. Neil, who is in drunken state, catches a glimpse of Avni and assumes that again she is a figment of his imagination. Avni takes Neil to Sukun house and the two relive sweet memories of their past together. However when Neil wakes up he doesn't remember anything. Meanwhile KK decides to shoot for his upcoming film in Kashid. When KK and Neil arrive in Kashid, Neil senses an inexplicable connection to the place and feels Avni's presence around him. Neil meets the kids of Sukoon house and Saisha. He also forms a special bond with Mowgli. Avni who is hiding from Neil becomes emotional after seeing Neil and Mowgli's closeness. Saisha and KK meet and gradually fall in love. Avni receives a mysterious letter from an unknown woman and believes that it may have been sent by Dayawanti, leading her to suspect that Dayawanti is still alive. Determined to uncover the truth, Avni begins investigating the letter.

Saisha and KK are kidnapped in a forest. Avni sets out to find Saisha, while Neil searches for KK. During their search Neil encounters Avni, and he is shocked to discover that she is alive. Furious and heartbroken, he confronts her for abandoning him and allowing him to believe that she had died ten years earlier. Neil questions Avni for leaving him but she remains silent. Avni tells Neil about the mysterious letter and her suspicions regarding Dayawanti. He agrees to help her despite his inner turmoil and it is eventually revealed that the letter was part of a plan orchestrated by Mitali. After discovering that Avni was alive, Mitali, who is in love with Neil, attempts to separate them. However, Avni and Neil expose Mitali's plan and confront her. Mitali admits her actions and apologizes to them. While Neil tells Mitali he considers her only a good friend. Avni and Neil subsequently rescue Saisha and KK from the kidnappers and bring them home. The Khanna family becomes happy after learning that Avni is alive.

It is later revealed that Saisha is pregnant with KK's child. KK's mother, Kamini Kapoor, refuses to accept their relationship. Despite her objections, Avni and Neil support Saisha, KK and get them married. Neil continues to blame Avni for leaving him but still loves and cares for her. Unable to reveal the truth to Neil, Avni bursts into tears, and asks him to forgot her and move on with his life despite loving Neil and angrily breaks their sacred mangalsutra from his wrist leaving Neil devastated. Neil decides to accept Mitali's proposal and marry her hurting Avni. Later Neil and the Khanna family discovers that Mowgli is his and Avni's son. Neil is shattered after learning this and accuses Avni of keeping him away from Mowgli all these years. He sends Avni a legal notice seeking custody of Mowgli, causing conflict between them. However, Neil decides to give Mowgli's custody back to Avni, realizing that he is more emotionally attached to her. Kamini continues to oppose Saisha and KK's marriage. She creates several problems for Saisha and also kidnaps Mowgli. Avni and Neil rescue him, and get Kamini arrested.

Mitali asks Neil to choose between her and Avni and insists that he marry her. Avni decides to step aside for Mitali and Neil's happiness. Meanwhile, it is revealed that Vidyut has died after an altercation with another prisoner while serving his sentence. Saisha eventually learns the truth about her biological parents, Juhi and Vidyut and the truth about her birth, being the illegitimate daughter of her Parents. She is shocked after discovering the truth about Neela's death. Saisha gets the evidence and reveals the truth to Neil. Neil is shattered by the revelation and realizes that Avni had sacrificed their love to protect his father. He goes to Avni, hugs her and apologizes for having blamed and hated her all the time. Avni urges Neil to not reveal the truth behind Neela's death to anyone. Neil reluctantly agrees and confesses his unconditional love for Avni which never ended but it's too late as he has already given commitment to marry Mitali.

Avni, encourages Neil to marry Mitali and move on with his life. She decides to leave the city with Mowgli so that Neil can begin a new life with Mitali. On the wedding day, Mitali realizes that Neil still loves Avni. Understanding that Neil's happiness lies with Avni, she calls off the wedding and urges him to reunite with Avni. Neil rushes to Avni and Mowgli at the same place where they both had met eachother for the first time. Neil tells Avni that he has come to take her and Mowgli home because he cannot live without them and can never love anyone else other than her. Mowgli becomes happy after his parents reunion and Avni finally accepts Neil and acknowledges him for always protecting her dignity throughout their relationship, when she was subjected to humiliation from Dayawanti Mehta and the society because she was born out of wedlock. Avni tells Neil that she wanted to keep Mowgli with her because he reminds her of Neil. Avni, Neil and Mowgli's reunion fulfills the dream once Avni had carried since her childhood, to have a perfect family with her parents. The series concludes with Avni overcoming the stigma that had questioned her character and finding the happiness and family she had always wished for. Avni, Neil and Mowgli embrace with a hug and live happily ever after.

=== Main ===
- Aditi Rathore as Avni Neil Khanna (Avni Ayesha) – Ayesha and Ashish's daughter; Neela's foster daughter; Aman's sister; Neil's wife; Mowgli's mother; Mishti's foster mother (2017–2018)
  - Arsheen Naamdaar as Child Avni Ayesha (2016–2017)
- Zain Imam as Neil Khanna – Former ACP turned radio jockey; Shweta and Prakash's son; Avni's husband; Mowgli's father; Mishti's foster father; Riya's ex fiancee(2017–2018)
- Sayantani Ghosh as Neela Parikh – Hemant's daughter; Ashish's ex-wife; Avni's foster mother; Mishti and Mowgli's foster grandmother (2016–2018) (Dead)
- Reema Lagoo / Ragini Shah as Dayawanti Mehta – Ashish, Ketan and Diksha's mother; Avni, Riya and Aman's grandmother; Mowgli's great-grandmother; Mishti's foster great-grandmother; Ayesha and Ashish's murderer (2016–2017) /(2017)(dead)
- Barkha Sengupta as Ayesha Haider – Fatima's daughter; Ashish’s first wife; Avni and Aman's mother; Mowgli's grandmother; Mishti's foster grandmother (2016–2017) (Dead)
- Viraf Patel as Ashish Mehta – Dayawanti's elder son; Ketan and Diksha's brother; Ayesha and Neela's ex-husband; Avni and Aman's father; Mowgli's grandfather; Mishti's foster grandfather (2016–2017) (Dead)

=== Recurring ===
- Kabir Shah as Mowgli Khanna – Avni and Neil's son; Mishti's foster brother; Aman and Riya's Nephew; Ayesha, Ashish and Shwetha, Prakash grandson; Harleen and Dayawanti's great-grandson (2018)
- Gulfam Khan as Fatima Haider – Ayesha's mother; Avni and Aman's grandmother; Mowgli's great-grandmother; Mishti's foster great-grandmother (2016–2017)
- Gautam Vig as Ali Khan – Avni's best friend; Neil's close friend (2017–2018)
  - Shubh Kalra as Child Ali (2016)
- Sushant Mohindru as Aman "Amol" Mehta – Ayesha and Ashish's son; Avni's brother (2017)
- Jahaan Arora as Inspector Dakhal "DD" Dayal – Neil's colleague and friend; Sunheri's love interest (2017–2018)
- Kunwar Amarjeet Singh as Aladdin aka Kabir – Avni's friend (2016)
- Nalini Negi as Riya Mehta – Hetal and Ketan's daughter; Aman and Avni's cousin; Neil's ex-fiancée (2017)
  - Sachi Tiwari as Child Riya (2016)
- Anaya Soni as Hetal Mehta – Ketan's wife; Riya's mother (2016–2017)
- Puru Chibber as Ketan Mehta – Dayawanti's younger son; Ashish and Diksha's brother; Riya's father; Ashish's murderer (2016–2017)
- Neelam Sivia as Diksha Mehta – Dayawanti's daughter; Ashish and Ketan's sister; Hansmukh's ex-wife (2016–2017)
- Vivek Madan as Hansmukh Agarwal – Ashish's friend; Diksha's ex-husband (2016)
- Sanjay Swaraj as Prakash Khanna – Harleen's son; Shweta's husband; Neil's father; Mowgli's grandfather; Mishti's foster grandfather (2017–2018)
- Shruti Ulfat as Shweta Khanna – Prakash's wife; Neil's mother; Mowgli's grandmother; Mishti's foster grandmother (2017–2018)
- Neelu Kohli as Harleen Khanna – Prakash's mother; Neil's grandmother; Mowgli's great-grandmother; Mishti's foster great-grandmother (2017–2018)
- Payal Bhojwani as Mishti "Saisha" Karan Kapoor – Juhi and Vidyut's illegitimate daughter; Avni and Neil's foster daughter; Mowgli's foster sister; Karan's wife (2018)
  - Aayesha Vindhara as Child Mishti (2017–2018)
- Zaan Khan as Karan "KK" Kapoor – Film superstar; Kamini and Sharad's son; Mishti's husband (2018)
- Urfi Javed / Poonampreet Bhatia as Juhi Pandit – Neil's ex-girlfriend; Mishti's mother (2017) (Dead)
- Karam Rajpal as Vidyut Pandit – Ragini's son; Mishti's father ; Juhi's murderer 2017–2018) (Dead)
- Manini Mishra as Ragini Pandit – Vidyut's mother; Misti's grandmother; (2017–2018) (Dead)
- Soni Singh as Sunehri – Avni's friend and co-prisoner; DD's love interest (2017–2018)
- Sana Amin Sheikh as Inspector Mitali Sharma – Neil's colleague and friend (2017–2018)
- Prakriti Nautiyal as Tara – Sitara's twin sister; Avni's friend and co-prisoner (2017–2018)
- Pragya Nautiyal as Sitara – Tara's twin sister; Avni's friend and co-prisoner (2017–2018)
- Jayati Bhatia as Kamini Kapoor – Sharad's wife; Karan's mother (2018)
- Mohit Chauhan as Sharad Kapoor – Kamini's husband; Karan's father (2018)
- Bhavesh Balchandani as Samrat – An orphan at Sukoon house (2018)
- Swasti Katyal as Pinki – An orphan at Sukoon house (2018)
- Pawani Sharma as Daisy – An orphan at Sukoon house (2018)
- Priya Tandon as Monica – Avni's rival; Avni, Tara, Sitara and Sunheri's co-prisoner (2017–2018)
- Karan Jagdish Singh as Avni's lawyer (2018)

== Production ==
The show initially starred child actor Arsheen Naamdaar as Avni Ayesha, besides Viraf Patel, Barkha Sengupta and Reema Lagoo from September 2016 to March 2017. It then took a fifteen year-leap and focused on Avni Ayesha (Aditi Rathore) and Neil Khanna (Zain Imam). In May 2017, Ragini Shah replaced Reema Lagoo after the latter's demise. The show ended on 18 May 2018 completing 463 episodes and its slot was taken by Krishna Chali London.

== See also ==
- Vishesh Films
