= Neelam Sivia =

Indian television and film actress (born 1989)

- Born: Neelam Sivia; 1989 (age 36–37)
- Occupation: Actor
- Known for: 47 to 84

Neelam Sivia (born 1989) is an Indian television and film actress.

== Early life and career ==
She has worked in a Punjabi film 47 to 84.

She has also worked in many television shows like Kya Huaa Tera Vaada, MTV Webbed, Gumrah: End of Innocence, Love by Chance, Yeh Hai Aashiqui, Pyaar Tune Kya Kiya, Halla Bol, Saubhagyalakshmi, Nadaniyaan and Naamkarann.

She finished working in 4 Lions Films' web series Tanhaiyan as Tanya and TV series called Naamkarann on Star Plus.

Currently, she is seen in the webseries called Aafat.

== Personal life ==
Sivia married musician and drummer Apoorv Singh.

== Filmography ==
=== Film ===
Year	Film	Role
2014	47 to 84	Reet

=== Television ===
Year	Film	Role	Channel	Ref(s)
2013	Kya Huaa Tera Vaada	Anika Sarkar Bhalla	Sony TV	
2013	Gumrah: End of Innocence		Channel V India	
2013	MTV Webbed	Surbhi Oberoi	MTV India	
2014	Love by Chance	Sheetal	Bindaas	
2014	Yeh Hai Aashiqui	Naina	Bindaas	
2015	Pyaar Tune Kya Kiya	Saumya	Zing	
2015	Yeh Hai Aashiqui Siyappa Ishq Ka	Pratyusha	Bindaas	
2015	Halla Bol	Megha		
2016	Pyaar Tune Kya Kiya	Ismaira	Zing	
2016	Saubhagyalakshmi	Muskaan Prajapati	&TV	
2016	Nadaniyaan	Nikki/Nikita Thapar	Big Magic	
2016	Tanhaiyan	Tanya	Hotstar	Webseries
2016-2017	Naamkarann	Diksha	Star Plus	
2019	Aafat	Anu Chhabra		Webseries
