= Baawre =

- Written by: Neelesh Misra
- Starring: Abhishek Rawat; Vinita Joshi Thakkar; Priya Tandon
- Country of origin: India
- Original language: Hindi
- No. of seasons: 1
- No. of episodes: 67

Production
- Producer: Sudhir Sharma
- Running time: ~24 minutes
- Production company: Sunshine Productions

Original release
- Network: Life OK
- Release: 2 June – 4 September 2014

Baawre is an Indian television drama that aired on Life OK. It first began broadcasting on 2 June 2014 and went off air on 5 September 2014. The show stars Abhishek Rawat and Vinita Joshi Thakkar as two individuals who at first hate each other but eventually fall in love. The show was scripted by Neelesh Misra and produced by Sudhir Sharma for Sunshine Productions.

== Plot ==
Nikumbh, a theatre director, a successful playwright who puts life in his plays and believes in his innate talent, aims to touch the skies with his hard work. He has a dedicated outlook towards life and love. Nikumbh does not believe in love and goes ahead to bump into his future love Yamini accidentally. The cupid struck them but with arguments. Yamini, a famous singer, whose life is only lined by her father Raghavendra Singh. She wants to live her life as her dad moulds it, no matter she gets happiness in it or not. He wants her to get him many civil contracts by using her singing talent and making good terms with the city bigwigs. Raghavendra is very ambitious and uses Yamini to make contacts.

Yamini feels upset seeing her dad not supporting her at times, but his love keeps her going. Yamini's family is very loving and caring which makes her tough life simple. Her Maa and Dadi always take her side to counter Raghavendra when anything goes against Yamini's wish. Raghavendra wants the best for Yamini and himself too. He loves Yamini but his dreams are more important to him than her. Nikumbh and his best friend Azam hangout together, where Nikumbh passes most of the time bitching about Yamini. Azam is in love with Shaheen and finds ways to stick around her. Nikumbh helps him get Shaheen's mobile number and Azam is thankful to him.

Nikumbh loses the rehearsal hall to Yamini, and is annoyed with her. Yamini feels bad for him as she did not know Raghavendra has taken Nikumbh’s hall for her rehearsals. She goes at a Boutique’s inauguration, where she is given a western revealing dress by Neha. Yamini does not want to wear the dress at MLA Tripathi's daughter Neha's party, and suddenly Nikumbh passes by and slips, making the ink fall on the dress. Yamini is thankful to him for saving her from wearing the dress. She wears the other dress which Raghavendra gifted her on her birthday and Tripathi and Neha are annoyed. Yamini manages to tell them the fate of the ruined dress. Tripathi is eyeing Yamini knowing what Raghavendra wants from him.

Neelesh Misra is the Sutradhar of the show, who tells us about how the leads are feeling and links their stories together. It presents a unique style of storytelling which was never seen before. In the upcoming episodes, the track goes like this..... Nikumbh is annoyed when he learns that he lost his play slot to Yamini, already knowing he lost the rehearsal hall to her before. Yamini has nothing to do in this and all this is done by Raghavendra. There begins a misunderstanding between them. Yamini apologizes to Nikumbh knowing his loss because of her. Later on, Yamini comes to Nikumbh’s theatre group to do a role, knowing he needs someone. Nikumbh feels she is a singer and won’t have any acting talent. He dismisses her and Yamini asks him to decide after taking her audition. Let’s see how Yamini and Nikumbh’s love story starts. Yamini gives the audition and gets Nikumbh’s approval. She ends up as the heroine of his play and slowly likes his ideas and talent. She eventually falls in love with him. Baawre looks a good novel concept which will be shaping up its storyline with each episode.

== Cast ==
- Abhishek Rawat as Nikumbh
- Vinita Joshi Thakkar as Yamini Raghavendra
- Priya Tandon as Shaheen
- Akhlaque Khan as Azam
- Alka Amin as Yamini's Dadi (Grandmother)
- Sanjay Batra as Raghavendra Singh
- Seema Pandey as Yamini's mother and wife of Raghavendra Singh
