= Mohit Abrol =

Indian television actor

- मोहित अबरोल
- Born: Mohit Vijay Abrol; 1 November 1988 (age 37); Dharmsala, Himachal Pradesh, India
- Citizenship: Indian
- Occupation: Actor
- Known for: Razia Sultan; Kavach... Kaali Shaktiyon Se; Porus

Mohit Abrol is an Indian television actor. He is known for acting in shows Balika Vadhu and Razia Sultan (TV series).

== Personal life ==
He was engaged to television actress, Mansi Srivastava, but then they broke up after a while.

== Career ==
Mohit has acted in various TV shows like: Balika Vadhu, Razia Sultan, Pyaar Ko Ho Jaane Do, Tum Saath Ho Jab Apne, MTV Fanaah, Meri Aashiqui Tum Se Hi, Swaragini - Jodein Rishton Ke Sur, Gangaa, Kavach...Kaali Shaktiyon Se, Going home (short film) and Porus.

He has also done episodics in Yeh Hai Aashiqui, Pyaar Tune Kya Kiya and in Darr Sabko Lagta Hai. In 2017, he was seen in the web series Tanhaiyan as Siddharth. He went on to portray the role of Hasti in Sony TV's Porus.

== Filmography ==
=== Films ===
Year	Film	Role	Ref(s)
2015	Masaan	Traveller Boy	
2015	ABCD 2	Master of ceremonies	

=== Television ===
Year	Show	Role	Ref(s)
2014	Balika Vadhu	Anuj	
2014	Tum Saath Ho Jab Apne	Ayaan	
2014	MTV Fanaah	Jo	
2015	Yeh Hai Aashiqui	Aahan	
2015	Razia Sultan	Nasiruddin Mahmud	
2015	Meri Aashiqui Tum Se Hi	Nirbhay Singh Alhawat	
2015	Pyaar Ko Ho Jaane Do	Atif	
2016	Pyaar Tune Kya Kiya	Rishabh	
2016	Swaragini-Jodein Rishton Ke Sur	Rajat Lodha	
2016	Gangaa	Rudra	
2016	Kavach... Kaali Shaktiyon Se	Jolly	
2016	Darr Sabko Lagta Hai	Rakesh	
2017	Tanhaiyan	Siddharth	
2017–2018	Porus	Hasti	
2019	Vidya	Anand	
2022	Ali Baba: Dastaan-E-Kabul	Zoravar Abdali	
