= Suman Indori =

Indian drama television series

- Genre: romantic comedy
- Created by: Prateek Sharma
- Creative director: Avhiroop Mazzumdar
- Starring: Ashnoor Kaur; Zain Imam; Anita Hassanandani
- Country of origin: India
- Original language: Hindi
- No. of seasons: 1
- No. of episodes: 236

Production
- Producer: Prateek Sharma
- Production location: Indore
- Camera setup: Multi-camera
- Running time: 20 minutes
- Production company: Studio LSD Private Limited

Original release
- Network: Colors TV
- Release: 3 September 2024 – 27 April 2025

Suman Indori is an Indian Hindi-language romantic drama television series that aired from 3 September 2024 to 27 April 2025 on Colors TV. It is produced by Prateek Sharma under Studio LSD Private Limited and it stars Ashnoor Kaur, Zain Imam, and Anita Hassanandani. It is the remake of Colors Kannada's TV series Kendasampige. The show took a four-year leap in January 2025.

== Plot ==
Suman runs a food truck in Indore, her brother, Rishi is involved with aspiring MLA Teerth Mittal and dies during a protest. To preserve his reputation, Teerth marries Suman. Suman strives to heal the Mittal family and uncover Devika's true colours.

== Cast ==
=== Main ===
- Ashnoor Kaur as Suman Sharma Mittal: Hema's elder daughter; Rishi Sharma and Bhoomi's sister; Teerth's wife; Rishi Mittal's foster mother (2024–2025)
- Zain Imam as Teerth Mittal: Politician; Chandrakant and Geetanjali's second son; Gururaj, Akhil and Purvi's brother; Suman's husband; Rishi Mittal's foster father (2024–2025)
- Anita Hassanandani as Devika Gupta Mittal: Gajinder's elder daughter; Kritika's sister; Gururaj's wife; Riva's mother; Rishi Sharma's murderer (2024–2025)

=== Recurring ===
- Sai Ballal as Chandrakant Mittal: Geetanjali's husband; Gururaj, Teerth, Akhil and Tanvi's father; Riva and Rishi Mittal's grandfather; Rishi Sharma's co-murderer (2024–2025)
- Nishigandha Wad as Geetanjali Mittal: Chandrakant's wife; Gururaj, Teerth, Akhil and Purvi's mother; Riva and Rishi Mittal's grandmother (2024–2025)
- Aman Sharma as Gururaj Mittal: Chandrakant and Geetanjali's eldest son; Teerth, Akhil and Purvi's brother; Devika's husband; Riva's father (2024–2025)
- Reeza Choudhary as Riva Mittal: Devika and Gururaj's daughter; Rishi Mittal's cousin (2025)
  - Mayanshi Verma as Child Riva (2024–2025)
- Sachin Sharma as Akhil Mittal: Chandrakant and Geetanjali's youngest son; Gururaj, Teerth and Purvi's brother; Bhoomi's husband; Rishi Mittal's father (2024–2025)
- Mansi Bhanushali as Advocate Bhoomi Sharma Mittal: Hema's younger daughter; Suman and Rishi Sharma's sister; Akhil wife; Rishi Mittal's mother (2024–2025)
- Shaurya Vijayvargiya as Rishi Mittal: Bhoomi and Akhil's son; Suman and Teerth's foster son; Riva's cousin (2025)
- Aayushree Sangle / Tanvi Sawant as Purvi Mittal: Chandrakant and Geetanjali's daughter; Gururaj, Teerth and Akhil's sister (2024) / (2024–2025)
- Arunim Mishra as Rishi Sharma: Hema's son; Suman and Bhoomi's brother (2024; 2025)
  - Advik Singh Rana as Child Rishi (2024)
- Shweta Gautam as Hema Sharma: Suman, Rishi Sharma and Bhoomi's mother; Rishi Mittal's grandmother (2024–2025)
- Manisha Purohit as Malini Sharma: Hema's sister-in-law; Suman, Rishi Sharma and Bhoomi's aunt (2024–2025)
- Angad Hasija as Vikram Chauhan: Suman's friend, ex-fiancé and obsessive one-sided lover (2025)
- Sambhabana Mohanty as Kritika Gupta: Gajinder's younger daughter; Devika's sister; Teerth's ex-fiancée and one-sided obsessive lover (2024–2025)
- Sandeep Kapoor as Gajinder Gupta: Devika and Kritika's father; Riva's grandfather (2024–2025)
- Ranveer Singh Malik as Gulshan: Raunak's brother Purna's son (2024–2025)
- Uma Basu as Purna: Gulshan and Raunak's mother (2024–2025)
- Gultesham Khan as Chitragupta: Teerth's best friend (2024)
- Ahmad Harhash as Raunak: Gulshan's brother Purna's son (2024–2025)

== Production ==
=== Casting ===
Ashnoor Kaur was cast as Suman Sharma and this series made the mark comeback of Kaur after three years hiatus on TV. Zain Imam and Anita Hassanandani was selected to play Teerth and Devika. Sandeep Kapoor was cast as Gajinder Gupta.
