= Gold Glam and Style Awards =

Annual Indian television awards

- Awarded for: Style Awards for Hindi Television
- Location: Mumbai, Maharashtra
- Country: India
- Presented by: Vikaas Kalantri
- First award: 2020
- Final award: present

Television/radio coverage
- Network: ZEE5
- Produced by: Vikaas Kalantri

The Gold Glam and Style Awards is an annual awards show that honours the most stylish and presentable performers in the Hindi-language television industry. The awards categories include artists from series, music, social media, news, and fashion. The event is founded by Vikaas Kalantari, who also runs Gold Awards.

== Winners ==
Category	Winner(s)
Category	2020
Fitness Icon (Male) – TV	Harshad Chopda
Fitness Icon (Female) – TV	Drashti Dhami
Fitness Icon (Female) – OTT	Pooja Banerjee
Fitness Icon (Male) – Social Media	Gurmeet Choudhary
Fitness Icon (Female) – Social Media	Debina Bonnerjee
Stylish Actor (Male) – TV	Pearl V Puri
Stylish Actor (Female) – TV	Helly Shah & Kanika Mann
Stylish Actor (Male) – OTT	Karan Tacker
Stylish Actor (Female) – OTT	Nikita Dutta
Stylish Influencer (Male)	Shakti Arora
Stylish Influencer (Male)	Nakuul Mehta
Stylish Influencer (Female)	Avneet Kaur
Professional Glamorous Star (Male) – TV	Dheeraj Dhoopar
Professional Glamorous Star (Female) – TV	Shraddha Arya
Best Dressed Actor (Male) – TV	Sharad Malhotra
Best Dressed Actor (Female) – TV	Nyra Banerjee
Best Dressed Actor (Female) – TV	Surbhi Jyoti
Most Photogenic Star (Male) – TV	Mohsin Khan
Most Photogenic Star (Female) – TV	Mugdha Chaphekar
Most Photogenic Star (Female) – OTT	Raai Laxmi
Alive Anchor – OTT	Gunjan Utreja
Most Stylish Reality Star (Male) – TV	Karan Kundra
Most Stylish Reality Star (Female) – TV	Gauhar Khan
Man of Substance	Arjun Bijlani
Woman of Substance	Shweta Tiwari & Munmun Dutta
Most Sought After Influencer (Male)	Siddharth Nigam
Most Sought After Influencer (Female)	Jannat Zubair Rahmani & Shivangi Joshi
Style Icon of Television Industry (Male)	Siddharth Shukla
Diva of the Television Industry	Hina Khan
Hotstepper (Male) – TV	Zain Imam
Hotstepper (Female) – TV	Surbhi Chandna
Stylish Couple	Prince Narula and Yuvika Chaudhary
Diva of the Year	Hina Khan
