= Tanhaiyan =

- Genre: Drama
- Written by: Divy Nidhi Sharma (Dialogues)
- Story by: Gul Khan
- Directed by: Gorky M
- Starring: Barun Sobti; Surbhi Jyoti; Aansh Arora; Mohit Abrol; Rahul Sharma; Neelam Sivia; Nisha Nagpal; Priya Tandon; Sheeba Chaddha
- Theme music composer: Sanjeev Srivastava
- Country of origin: India
- Original language: Hindi
- No. of seasons: 1
- No. of episodes: 10

Production
- Producer: Gul Khan
- Cinematography: Gorky M
- Running time: 20 minutes
- Production company: 4 Lions Films

Original release
- Network: Hotstar
- Release: 14 February 2017

Tanhaiyan (transl. Solitude) is a Hotstar original romantic drama television series. It stars Barun Sobti and Surbhi Jyoti in lead roles. The series included 10 episodes of about 20 minutes each. It was produced by 4 Lions Films and distributed by Star India.

== Plot ==
Set against a wedding backdrop, the show focuses on two individuals, Meera and Haider, who meet at the wedding of their friends Avantika and Sid. Haider is a rich and carefree casanova, while Meera is a bubbly and cheerful fashion designer. Haider holds himself and his absence responsible for his friend Raza's suicide, after Haider had left for London. Meera feels lonely after her parents died in a car accident. Both bottle their pasts, repressing their pain under their new personalities.

The two constantly bicker, playfully flirt with each other and decide to go for a one-night stand, which Meera drunkenly calls "sleepex". They grow closer after a failed attempt, finally do it and soon realize that they developed feelings for each other. Haider feels affected by Meera and pushes her away, scared that his feelings will make him vulnerable, and break his 'casanova' coping mechanism to escape his past.

Meanwhile, Avantika struggles with a secret of her own. When Sid and Avantika were briefly broken up at some point, Avantika had a brief one-night stand with their common friend, Sameer. Avantika reveals her long-buried secret to Sid, and he breaks off the marriage.

Haider visits Raza's grave, which he had avoided since he died, and finally breaks down, mourning his best friend. Meanwhile, heartbroken by Haider's dismissive and absent behaviour towards her. Meera decides to leave for a job in New York. Slowly waking up and smelling the coffee, Haider visits Raza's mother, where he has the epiphany that he cannot let Meera go. He rushes back and stops her from leaving, confessing his love to her, and they embrace. Later, he proposes marriage to her, which she accepts.

Meanwhile, Sid and Avantika reunite after sorting out their problems. On the engagement day of Haider and Meera, Haider notices Meera's earrings and recognizes them as his mother's, which were owned by Raza. Haider unlocks Raza's laptop, which was in his possession, by typing Meera's birthdate, and the laptop opens with a picture of Meera as the wallpaper. Shattered, he leaves the venue for London without any explanation, leaving Meera heartbroken.

Months later, Meera and Haider are still not over each other. Meera decides to go abroad for work and visits Avantika, who tells her about Raza. Meera remembers how she knows Raza whom she had worked with but never knew that he was silently in love with her. He proposed to her once but, because they had barely even spoken, Meera took it as a practical joke and jokingly said yes. She concludes that he might have committed suicide since he was lonely after she stopped working after her parents' death, realizing Meera was not serious. She received the earrings as a gift from Raza during her parents' funeral, but she never knew who sent them.

Meanwhile, Raza's mother, now aware of the situation, explains to Haider that Meera has no part in Raza's death. On the night before Meera's flight to New York, she visits Haider's house where they first met and reminisces all their moments when he finds an emotional Haider standing there who apologizes to her and they confess their love to each other. They reunite and hug passionately.

== Cast ==
- Barun Sobti as Haider Ali Khan
- Surbhi Jyoti as Meera Kapoor
- Aansh Arora as Vishal Malhotra
- Mohit Abrol as Siddharth Khanna "Sid", Haider's best friend, Avantika's husband
- Priya Tandon as Avantika Khanna, Meera's best friend, Sid's wife
- Rahul Sharma as Raza Siddiqui, Haider's friend
- Sheeba Chaddha as Mrs. Siddiqui, Raza's mother
- Neelam Sivia as Tanya, Meera's best friend
- Nisha Nagpal as Rashi

== Development ==
On 3 June 2016, first teaser of the web show was released. On 30 September 2016, a 3-minute trailer of the web show was released on YouTube. On 14 February 2017, all episodes of the web series were aired on Hotstar.
