= Bade Achhe Lagte Hain 4 =

2025 Indian television series

- Genre: Romance; Drama
- Created by: Ekta Kapoor
- Screenplay by: Shilpa Jathar
- Story by: Sonali Jaffar
- Directed by: Atif Khan; Ajay Kumar
- Creative director: Ketaki Walawalkar
- Starring: Harshad Chopda; Shivangi Joshi
- Opening theme: Bade Achhe Lagte Hain by Shreya Ghoshal
- Country of origin: India
- Original language: Hindi
- No. of episodes: 70

Production
- Executive producers: Nilesh Mishra; Shailesh Sharma; Ashutosh Kumar
- Producers: Ekta Kapoor; Shobha Kapoor
- Cinematography: Nidhin Valande
- Editors: Vikas Sharma; Vishal Sharma; Sandeep Bhatt
- Camera setup: Multi camera
- Running time: 22 minutes
- Production company: Balaji Telefilms

Original release
- Network: Sony Entertainment Television
- Release: 16 June – 19 September 2025

Related
- Bade Achhe Lagte Hain; Bade Achhe Lagte Hain 2 Bade Achhe Lagte Hain 3

Bade Achhe Lagte Hain 4 is an Indian Hindi-language romantic drama television series that aired on Sony TV from 16 June 2025 to 19 September 2025. It is produced by Ekta Kapoor under Balaji Telefilms, it is the fourth installment of the Bade Achhe Lagte Hain franchise. It stars Harshad Chopda and Shivangi Joshi as Rishabh and Bhagya.

== Plot ==
Bhagyashree Iyer is an independent woman who lives in Delhi. She heads Tattvaa and for the last five years has been living away from her parents. She left her home to marry her boyfriend Nikhil after her parents refused to meet him. Nikhil rejected her since he was only after her father's money. The betrayal left her with trust issues and no faith in love.

Rishabh Kapoor is a cheerful and happy-go-lucky man struggling to make ends meet. He was in need of a job and got one at Tattvaa. Bhagyashree learns that her parents, who never learned what happened five years ago, are coming to visit her and her husband. Her friend Nitya advises her to marry before they arrive to portray a happy married life.

She meets Vikram Bhalla, head of Tattvaa's west zone and agrees to marry him. Rishabh exposes him as a fraud and two-timer, thus saving Bhagya from being manipulated. Her parents assume Rishabh is her husband and the two maintain the facade. Bhagya falls in love with Rishabh but he is hiding a truth.

He is a rich businessman and he came into Bhagya's life hoping to earn her trust so he can avenge his father Gautam Kapoor who is in jail because of her false testimony. Despite his mission, Rishabh ends up growing feelings for Bhagya making him feel guilty and conflicted. Naysa, Rishabh's former wife, who remains obsessed with Rishabh, is revealed to be Bhagya's boss. Rishabh discovers that Bhagya believed the victims who were paid by Naysa to speak up against Gautam and gave the testimony. She did not know he was innocent and this was a setup.

Naysa later discovers that the man Bhagya loves is Rishabh and publicly exposes the truth. She reveals that Rishabh is a Kapoor and lies that they are still married. Bhagya is left shattered, heartbroken and asks Rishabh to leave her life. Her pain eclipses the mistake she made of giving a false testimony against an innocent man without checking. She goes to court and corrects her mistake but fails to realise the magnitude of how it destroyed a family.

Bhagya has hardened her heart and refuses to trust anyone. She focuses on work, staying healthy and being with her family. Bhagya left Tattvaa and now works in Kalos, a company whose boss is later revealed to be Rishabh. He also moves next door to Bhagya to regain her trust. Despite many people trying to frame them for wrongdoings in order to separate them, the two remain together and eventually marry.

== Cast ==
=== Main ===
- Harshad Chopda as Rishabh Kapoor: Owner of Kapoor Industries; CEO and managing director of Kalos; Gautam's son; Purab's brother; Bhagya's husband
- Shivangi Joshi as Bhagyashree "Bhagya" Iyer Kapoor: Employee at Kalos; former national head of Tattvaa; Padma and Vinayak's daughter; Karthik, Shreyas and Revathi's sister; Rishabh's wife

=== Recurring ===
- Pyumori Mehta Ghosh as Padma Iyer: Karuna's sister; Vinayak's wife; Karthik, Bhagya, Shreyas and Revathi's mother
- Manoj Kolhatkar as Vinayak Iyer: Padma's husband; Karthik, Bhagya, Shreyas and Revathi's father
- Ashish Kaul as Gautam Kapoor: Rishabh and Purab's father
- Vedaant Saluja as Purab Kapoor: Gautam's son; Rishabh's brother; Revathi's husband
- Tasneem Khan as Revathi Iyer Kapoor: Padma and Vinayak's daughter; Bhagya, Shreyas and Karthik's sister; Purab's wife
- Yash Pandit as Karthik Iyer: Padma and Vinayak's son; Bhagya, Shreyas and Revathi's brother; Soumya's husband
- Divyangana Jain as Soumya Iyer: Ramya's sister; Kartik's wife; Bhagya's college rival-turned-sister-in-law
- Vihan Verma as Shreyas Iyer: Padma and Vinayak's son; Bhagya, Kartik and Revathi's brother
- Rishika Nag as Naysa: Temporary owner of Tattvaa; Rishabh's former girlfriend; Bhagya's former boss
- Anchal Sabharwal as Nitya: Employee at Kalos; former employee at Tattvaa; Naveen's wife; Bhagya's best friend and neighbor
- Nikhil Sharma as Naveen: Nitya's husband; Bhagya's neighbor
- Nitin Bhatia as Sunny: Employee at Kalos; former employee at Tattvaa; Rishabh's childhood friend
- Arushi Handa as Sonia: Employee at Kalos; former employee at Tattvaa; Bhagya and Nitya's friend
- Savant Singh Premi / Ribbhu Mehra as Nikhil: Employee at Kalos; Bhagya's former boyfriend
- Suupriya Shukla as Dr. Ramya: Government doctor; former personal doctor of Gautam; Soumya's sister
- Shivani Sopori as Lajjo: Member of LGBT gossip group; Bhagya's neighbour
- Deepika Khanna as Babita "Bobby" Arora: Member of LGBT gossip group; Arjan's sister; Bhagya's neighbour
- Khushbu Thakkar as Tanu: Member of LGBT gossip group; Hatti's former girlfriend; Bhagya's neighbour
- Jyoti Negi as Geetu: Member of LGBT gossip group; Bhagya's neighbour
- Aafreen Dabestani as Mia: Criminal, Revati's catfisher and blackmailer
- Krishna Shetty as Mukul Chaddha: Secretary of Bhagya's residential society
- Pankaj Bhatia as Parmeet Mehta: Chairman of Bhagya's residential society
- Anuj Ahluwalia as Bittu: Member of Bhagya's residential society board
- Avirat Parekh as Hatti: Tanu's former boyfriend; member of Bhagya's residential society board
- Dipti Kashyap as Nandini: Nikhil's friend
- Dipti Joshi as Karuna Iyer: Padma's sister; Mukund's wife; Meenakshi's mother; Bhagya's aunt
- Iqbal Tauqeer as Mukund: Karuna's husband; Meenakshi's father; Bhagya's uncle
- Smriti Thakur as Meenakshi: Karuna and Mukund's daughter; Shekhar's wife; Bhagya's cousin
- Hirav Mehta as Shekhar: Meenakshi's husband
- Devshree Sharma as Shekhar's mother
- Rohit Choudhary as Vikram Bhalla: Former head of Tattvaa's west zone; Shaina's husband; Bhagya's former suitor
- Saumya Bhandari as Shaina Nath: Nathulal's niece; Vikram's wife
- Ravi Kothari as Nathulal: Shaina's uncle; Rishabh's former landlord
- Stuti Chopra as Shobhita: Bhagya's college friend
- Gaurav S Bajaj as Raman Bhalla: Bhagya's former suitor

== Production ==
=== Development ===
The series was announced by Balaji Telefilms for Sony Entertainment Television. The show was initially titled Bahaarein. It was later changed to Bade Achhe Lagte Hain. In August, the show saw a six-month leap.

=== Casting ===
Harshad Chopda and Shivangi Joshi were cast as Rishabh Kapoor and Bhagyashree Iyer. The show marks their first collaboration. They were the leads of different generations of Yeh Rishta Kya Kehlata Hai but did not get to share screen space. Manoj Kolhatkar, Pyumori Mehta Ghosh and Ashish Kaul joined as Rishabh and Bhagyashree's parents Vinayak Iyer, Padma Iyer and Gautam Kapoor. Nitin Bhatia was cast as Sunny. Next, Saumya Bhandari played Shaina Nath. Aafreen Dabestani was roped in as Mia. In August, Rishika Nag entered as Naysa. Ribbhu Mehra replaced Savant Singh Premi as Nikhil.

=== Filming and release ===
Principal photography of the show began in March 2025. The first look of the series was released on 26 March 2025 featuring Shivangi Joshi and Harshad Chopda. Bade Achhe Lagte Hain 4 premiered on Sony Entertainment Television on 16 June 2025. It is digitally available to stream on SonyLIV. The first episode was screened on set.

== Awards and nominations ==
Year	Award	Category	Nominee	Result	Ref
2025	Lions Gold Awards	Best Actor Popular	Harshad Chopda	Won	
2025	Lions Gold Awards	Best Actress Popular	Shivangi Joshi	Won	
2025	Lions Gold Awards	Best Actor in a Powerful Character	Pyumori Mehta Ghosh	Won	
2025	Lions Gold Awards	Best Actor in a Negative Role	Rishika Nag	Won	
2025	Indian Television Academy Awards	Best Actor Popular	Harshad Chopda	Won	
2025	Indian Television Academy Awards	Best Actress Popular	Shivangi Joshi	Nominated	
2026	Indian Television Academy Awards	Best Actor Popular	Harshad Chopda	Pending	
2026	Indian Television Academy Awards	Best Actress Popular	Shivangi Joshi	Pending	
2026	Indian Television Academy Awards	Best Drama Popular	Bade Achhe Lagte Hain 4	Pending	
