= Zain Imam =

Indian television actor (born 1988)

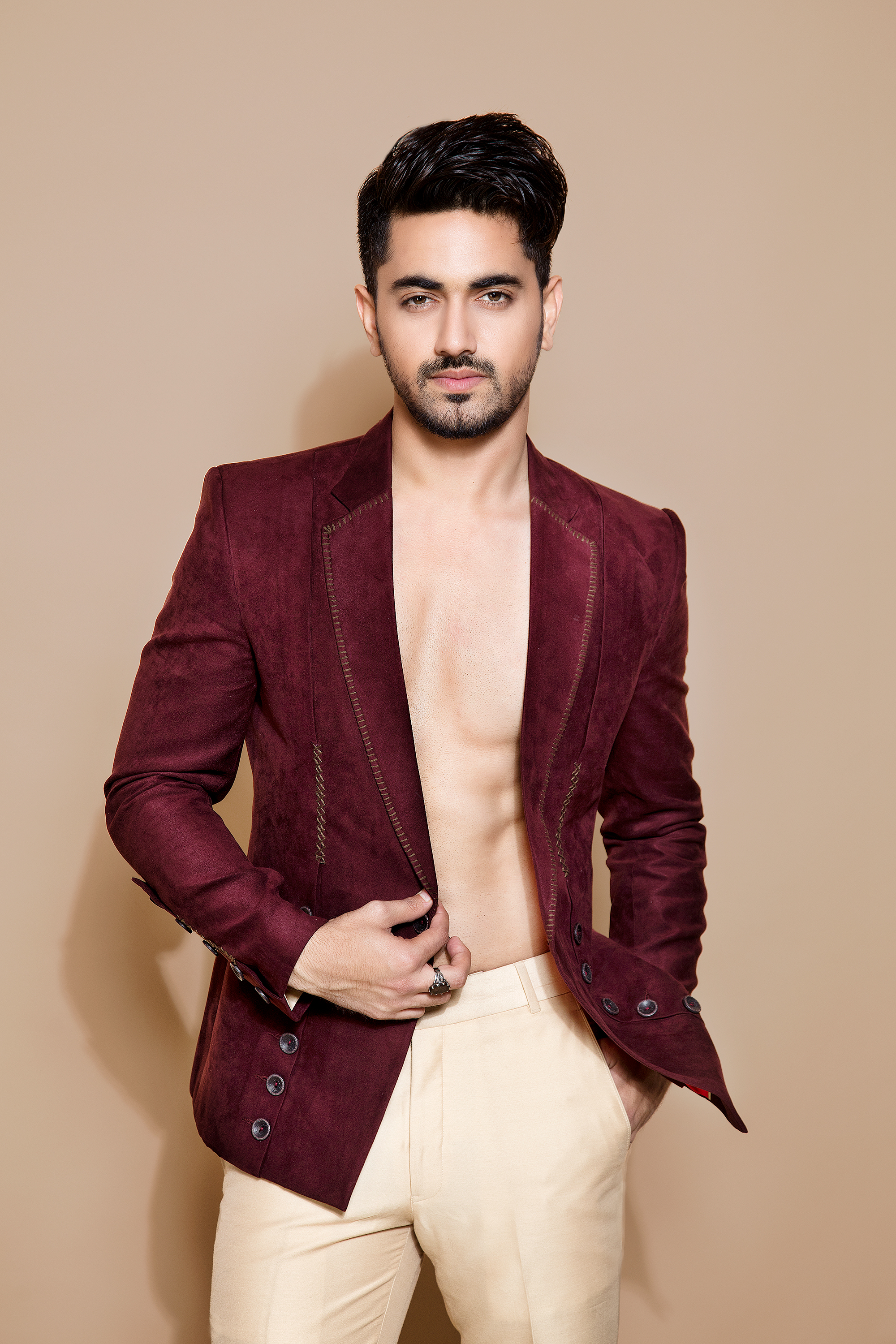
- Zain Imam
- Born: Syed Zain Imam; 18 May 1988 (age 38); Delhi, India
- Education: University of Delhi
- Occupations: Actor; Model
- Years active: 2014–present
- Known for: Naamkarann; Tashan-e-Ishq; Fanaa: Ishq Mein Marjawan
- Awards: Gold Awards (For Best Actor in Negative Role and Most Stylish Actor)

Zain Imam is an Indian actor who predominantly works in Hindi television. He is best known for his roles in Naamkaran, Fanaa: Ishq Mein Marjawan and Tashan-E-Ishq which earned him Gold Awards for Best Actor in Negative Role. In 2019, he participated in Khatron Ke Khiladi 9.

== Career ==
=== Early career and success (2014–2017) ===
Imam started his career as a model, working for agencies such as Aldo Group, and also did few TV commercials before debuting in Hindi television. His first work as an actor came with MTV India television series Kaisi Yeh Yaariaan where he played Abhimanyu Thakkar.

From 2015 to 2016, he played a grey-shaded character of Yuvraj Luthra in Zee TV's love triangle Tashan-e-Ishq opposite Jasmin Bhasin. The show proved a breakout for him, he won the Gold Award for Best Actor in a Negative Role.

Then, he was cast as Abir Dharmadhikari, new male lead of Zee TV's Yeh Vaada Raha when it took a large leap, from October 2016 to January 2017.

=== Establishment and other projects (2017–2021) ===
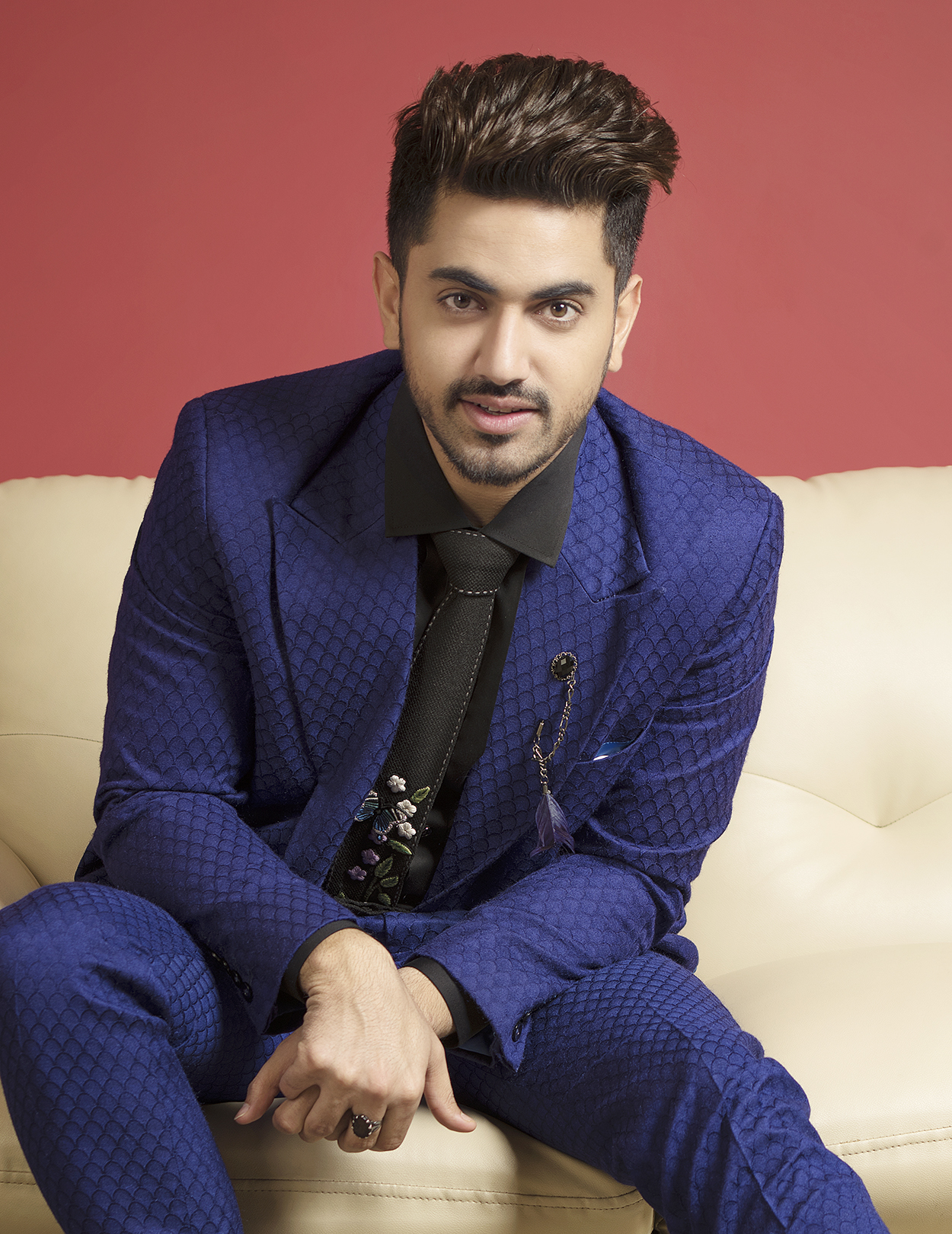

Imam got his biggest success when he was introduced as ACP Neil Khanna in StarPlus's romantic-drama Naamkarann along with Aditi Rathore after a generation leap. The show wrapped up in May 2018.

After doing an episodic in &TV's Laal Ishq with Mahhi Vij. Imam entered the popular StarPlus's series Ishqbaaaz as Mohit Malhotra, a full-fledged antagonist in September 2018.

Venturing into reality shows, Imam made his debut in reality with participated in the adventure stunt-based show Fear Factor: Khatron Ke Khiladi 9 in 2019 where he finished at 9th place.

His subsequent fictional role as Kabir Mittal, a former army officer in StarPlus' mystery revenge drama Ek Bhram Sarvagun Sampanna failed to impress audience. He was next seen in the music video Tanhaai by Tulsi Kumar under T-Series in 2020.

In 2021, Imam progressed into digital platform with the web series Crashh portrayed Dr. Rishabh Sachdeva co-starring Rohan Mehra, Kunj Anand, Aditi Sharma and Anushka Sen.

=== Television comeback (2022–present) ===
Imam returned to television after a long break of 3 years with his role of Agastya Raichand an obsessive/possessive lover, the main protagonist in Gul Khan production Fanaa: Ishq Mein Marjawan on Colors TV opposite Reem Shaikh. for which he received praise from audience. The show ended on 2 September 2022. In March 2023, he made a brief appearance in Bekaboo as Pratham Raichand opposite Shivangi Joshi. From September 2024 to April 2025, Imam portrayed Teerth Mittal in Colors TV's Suman Indori.

== In the media ==
He appeared in the Times of India's Top 20 "Most Desirable Men" list rank at No. 5 in 2018 and at No. 15 in 2019.

== Filmography ==
=== Television ===
Year	Title	Role	Notes	Ref.
2014–2015	Kaisi Yeh Yaariaan	Abhimanyu Thakkar		
2015–2016	Tashan-e-Ishq	Yuvraj "Yuvi" Luthra		
2016–2017	Yeh Vaada Raha	Abir Dharmadhikari		
2017–2018	Naamkarann	ACP Neil Khanna		
2018	Ishqbaaaz	Mohit Malhotra		
2018	Laal Ishq	Arjun	Episode: "Raatrani"	
2019	Khatron Ke Khiladi 9	Contestant	10th place	
2019	Ek Bhram Sarvagun Sampanna	Kabir Mittal		
2022	Fanaa: Ishq Mein Marjawan	Agastya Raichand / Arjun "Vicky" Sharma		
2023	Bekaboo	Pratham Raichand	Special appearance	
2024–2025	Suman Indori	Teerth Mittal		

=== Web series ===
Year	Title	Role	Notes	Ref.
2020	Never Kiss Your Bestfriend - Lockdown Special	Zayed		
2020	Poison	Harshvardhan Oberoi	Season 2	
2021	Crashh	Dr. Rishabh Sachdeva		
2022	Fanaa: Ishq Mein Marjawan: Aakhri Imtihaan	Agastya Raichand / Arjun "Vicky" Sharma		
2025	Lady Boss Returns	Randhir	Microdrama	

=== Music videos ===
Year	Title	Singer(s)	Ref.
2019	Yaara 2	Mamta Sharma	
2020	Yaariyan	Mamta Sharma	
2020	Tanhaai	Tulsi Kumar	
2021	Mujhko Mana Lena	Alka Yagnik, Ashok Ojha	
2021	Ishqiya	Shubham Singh Rajput	
2021	Promise	Ayaana Khan	
2022	Puri Bottle Ve	Ayaana Khan	
2022	Mulaqaat	Sumit Bhalla	
2022	Mukuraa Lena Tum	Palak Muchhal	
2022	Humko Tumse Pyaar Hua	Soham Naik	
2022	Bahut Bewafa Hai Wo	Javed Ali	
2023	Jo Haal Dil Ka	Dev Negi, Priya Saraiya	

== Awards and nominations ==
Year	Award	Category	Work	Result	Ref.
2016	Gold Awards	Best Actor In Negative Role (Critics)	Tashan-e-Ishq	Won	
2019	Gold Awards	Most Stylish Actor	—N/a	Won	
2017	Indian Television Academy Awards	Best Actor (Popular)	Naamkarann	Nominated	
2018	Indian Television Academy Awards	Best Actor (Popular)	Naamkarann	Nominated	
2019	Indian Telly Awards	Best On-screen Couple (with Aditi Rathore)	Naamkarann	Nominated	
2020	Gold Glam and Style Awards	Hotstepper (Male) TV	—N/a	Won	
2022	22nd Indian Television Academy	Best Actor (Popular)	Fanaa: Ishq Mein Marjawan	Nominated	
2023	Gold Awards	Best Actor in a Lead Role	Fanaa: Ishq Mein Marjawan	Nominated	
2023	Gold Awards	Best Jodi (with Reem Shaikh)	Fanaa: Ishq Mein Marjawan	Nominated	
2023	Gold Awards	Most Fit Actor	—N/a	Nominated	
2023	Gold Awards	Style Icon	—N/a	Nominated	
2025	Indian Telly Awards	Fan Favorite Star - Colors TV	Suman Indori	Won	

== See also ==
- List of Indian television actors
