= Naagin (2015 TV series) =

Indian Hindi-language supernatural fiction series

- Genre: Supernatural fiction
- Created by: Ekta Kapoor
- Written by: Neha Singh (season 1-2); Mukta Dhond (season 1-5); Mrinal Jha (season 3-6); Heena Kohli Khan (season 6); Lakshmi Jaikumar (season 6)
- Directed by: Santram Varma (season 1-2, 6); Ranjan Kumar Singh (season 3-6)
- Creative directors: Tanushree Dasgupta; Chloe Ferns; Kadar Kazi; Tanya Rajesh
- Starring: see below
- Country of origin: India
- Original language: Hindi
- No. of seasons: 7
- No. of episodes: 526 + 2 special

Production
- Producers: Ekta Kapoor; Shobha Kapoor
- Production location: Film City, Mumbai
- Cinematography: Santosh Suryavanshi; Sarfaraz; Ajay; Ravi Naidu; Sadanand Pillai
- Animators: Bodhisatva Datta; Ink Bling Designs Pvt. Ltd.
- Camera setup: Multi-camera
- Running time: 34–92 min
- Production company: Balaji Telefilms

Original release
- Network: Colors TV
- Release: 1 November 2015 – present

Related
- Kuch Toh Hai: Naagin Ek Naye Rang Mein; Bekaboo

Naagin (transl. Female serpent) is an Indian supernatural fiction television series about shape-shifting serpents produced by Ekta Kapoor under Balaji Telefilms.

The first season aired from 1 November 2015 to 5 June 2016. It starred Mouni Roy, Arjun Bijlani, Adaa Khan and Sudha Chandran.

The second season aired from 8 October 2016 to 25 June 2017. It starred Mouni Roy, Karanvir Bohra, Adaa Khan, Kinshuk Mahajan and Sudha Chandran.

The third season aired from 2 June 2018 to 26 May 2019. It starred Surbhi Jyoti, Pearl V Puri, Anita Hassanandani and Rajat Tokas.

The fourth season titled Naagin: Bhagya Ka Zehreela Khel (Note: Translation: Female serpent: the poisonous game of fate) premiered on 14 December 2019, its telecast was halted from 22 March 2020 due to COVID-19 outbreak and restarted on 18 July 2020 and ended on 8 August 2020. It starred Nia Sharma, Vijayendra Kumeria, Jasmin Bhasin, Anita Hassanandani and Rashami Desai.

The fifth season aired from 9 August 2020 to 6 February 2021. It starred Surbhi Chandna, Sharad Malhotra and Mohit Sehgal.

The sixth season aired from 12 February 2022 to 9 July 2023 and starred Tejasswi Prakash, Simba Nagpal, Mahek Chahal, Pratik Sehajpal, Shrey Mittal and Vatsal Sheth.

The seventh season aired from 27 December 2025 to 14 June 2026. It starred Priyanka Chahar Choudhary and Namik Paul.

The eighth season is scheduled to release in 2027.

== Series overview ==
Series	Episodes	Originally released	
Series	Episodes	First released	Last released
1	62	1 November 2015	5 June 2016
2	75	8 October 2016	25 June 2017
3	104	2 June 2018	26 May 2019
4	37	14 December 2019	8 August 2020
5	52	9 August 2020	6 February 2021
SO (Note: SO means Spin-off Kuch Toh Hai: Naagin Ek Naye Rang Mein)	13	7 February 2021	21 March 2021
SP (Note: SP refers to Basant Panchami Special)	2	5 February 2022	6 February 2022
6	146	12 February 2022	9 July 2023
7	50	27 December 2025	14 June 2026

== Plot ==
=== Season 1 ===
Shivanya and her sister Shesha vow to avenge the murder of Shivanya's parents, who were killed twenty years earlier by the Raheja family and their associates in a failed attempt to obtain the Naagmani. As part of her revenge, Shivanya marries Ritik Raheja on the day of his wedding. Shivanya kills three of the murderer and start falling in love with Ritik. During a period when Shesha assumes Shivanya's form to protect her sister, she too develops feelings for Ritik. The sisters later discover that Ritik belongs to the Suryavanshi lineage.

It is eventually revealed that Yamini is the fifth murderer. Along with her husband Ankush, she murdered Ritik's mother, kidnapped Ritik as a child, and imprisoned Sangram for years in pursuit of the Naagmani. Shesha betrays Shivanya and turns against her. After learning the truth about Yamini and Shivanya's real identity, Ritik and Shivanya consummate their marriage, causing Shivanya to lose her powers and become human. Ritik reunites with Sangram, who sacrifices his life to temporarily restore Shivanya's powers for twelve hours. In the final battle for the Naagmani, Shivanya kills Yamini, completing her revenge. Shesha later allies with the Mahishmatis clan, but Shivanya defeats her, and the Mahishmatis imprison Shesha for twenty-five years.

=== Season 2 ===
Shivanya gives birth to her daughter, Shivangi, in the third month of her pregnancy. Meanwhile, Avantika resurrects Yamini. Twenty-five years later, Shivangi is raised by her widowed mother, Shivanya, as a human, unaware of her true lineage or her mother's past. Shivangi falls in love with Rocky, Yamini's foster grandson. Shesha, who lives with Yamini disguised as a human orphan adopted by Yamini, also falls for Rocky. Shesha breaks the barrier imprisoning the Mahishmatis for years. Yamini arranges Shivangi and Rocky's marriage as part of a plot to kill Shivanya. Yamini, Shesha, and Avantika murder Shivanya and her entire family, prompting Shivangi to seek revenge. She uncovers the truth about her parents, as well as the real identities of Yamini, Shesha, and Avantika.

On her twenty-fifth birthday, Shivangi transforms into a naagin and marries Rocky to execute her revenge. Pretending to have lost her memory, she claims ignorance about her mother's killers. Yamini and her allies spare Shivangi, believing only she can obtain the Naagmani. Shivangi mistakenly suspects Rocky of being involved in her mother's murder. During her quest, she befriends Rudra, a naag also wronged by the same enemies. With Rudra's help, Shivangi kills four of the eight murderers. Avantika kills Rudra when he refuses to reveal Shivangi's identity, after which Shivangi uncovers Avantika's secret and kills her, leading to the complete annihilation of the Mahishmatis tribe. Nidhi is revealed as the eighth killer and is killed by Shivangi.

Shivangi's identity is exposed to Yamini and Shesha. She turns Shesha into a statue, but Rocky witnesses this and learns the truth about Shivangi being a naagin. Yamini manipulates events to make Shivangi believe she has killed her and emotionally blackmails Rocky into turning against Shivangi. After consummating their marriage, Shivangi loses her powers. Rocky breaks ties with her and has her arrested.

Forty-five days later, Shivangi discovers she is still a naagin and escapes from prison during a mass shootout. She learns that her father, Ritik, was murdered by Yamini and vows revenge. On his twenty-seventh birthday, Rocky transforms into a naag, learning that his mother was the Naagrani of the Takshak clan, killed by her husband. He accidentally frees Shesha, who assumes the identity of Takshika. Rocky later learns the truth and he reunites with Shivangi. Together, they kill Yamini and Shesha. However, under Ritik's orders, Rocky later stabs Shivangi to death. She dies unaware of the reason but vows to return.

=== Season 3 ===
Ruhi, disguised as Bela, arrives at Sehgal's house along with Vishakha to avenge the murder of her lover, Vikrant. They kills few of murderers including Yuvraj whom Bela was supposed to marry then Bela marry Mahir. It is later revealed that Vikrant is alive and had staged his death with the help of his mother, Sumitra: the Naagrani of the Nidhog clan in a calculated scheme to obtain the Naagmani. Yuvraj, also a naag and Sumitra's son, was complicit in the plan is revealed to be alive. When Bela discovers the truth, she is left shattered and betrayed. Vishakha initially sides with Vikrant in the pursuit of the Naagmani but later repents and rejoins Bela. Vikrant leaves his mother's evil plans and joins hands with Bela. Vikrant accepts Vishakha's love, and they marry. Upon learning Bela's true identity, Mahir is devastated and loses his memory, forgetting her entirely. Sumitra plots to marry Mahir to Vishakha, but Bela intervenes and restores his memories. Sumitra retaliates by pushing Bela, Vishakha, and Vikrant off a cliff, leaving Mahir mentally unstable. Bela returns to exact revenge, remarries Mahir, and uses the Naagmani to fully restore his memories. Their relationship is consummated. Sumitra seeks help from Hukkum who tries to impregnate Bela to give birth to a demon child. Vishakha kills Yuvraj, assumes Bela's identity, and gives birth to Taamsi, who rapidly grows and kills Hukkum. Bela later reveals her pregnancy to Mahir, but Taamsi murders them both and claims the Naagmani. However, the Naagmani is cursed by Mahanaagrani Shivangi, who survived the attack on her and since then has disappeared. Taamsi, Sumitra, and their allies are later told by a sage that Bela and Mahir will be reborn.

Twenty-eight years later, Bela and Mahir are reborn as Shravani and Mihir and reunite. Vikrant is killed by Taamsi and Sumitra. After learning Shivangi's truth, Shravani summons Mahanaagrani Shivangi to lift the Naagmani’s curse. Shivangi accidentally removes the curse, but Ritik and Rocky take the Naagmani and imprison them. Yamini, still alive, tries to buy the Naagmani but is killed by Shivangi. It's revealed Shesha, disguised as Rocky and Ritik, had killed Shivangi. Shivangi defeats her. Mihir rescues them. Ritik dies and reunites with Shivanya in the afterlife, while Shivangi and Rocky begin a new life together. Shivangi declares Shravani the Naagrani of Naaglok and guardian of the Naagmani. Shravani kills Sumitra, Taamsi, and Shesha. Naagmani is declared safe for fifty full moons, after which Shravani's duty ends. Shravani marries Mihir. Meanwhile, Vishakha vows to steal the Naagmani after fifty moons.

=== Season 4 ===
Naagin princess Manyata marries Keshav a human, thus losing her power and gives birth to Nayantara. Keshav is killed by the Parekh family. Manyata escapes and waits for her daughter's 25th birthday to avenge her husband's murder.

25 years later, Nayantara waits to get her naagin powers, however, the powers go to Brinda instead, who is later revealed to have been switched at birth with Nayantara. Meanwhile, Dev who is son of Keshav's murderer, falls in love with Brinda. Manyata and Brinda are reunited and Brinda marries Dev to take revenge.

Vishakha returns with the motive of getting Naagmani. She traps Nayantara in pillar and takes Dev's form and kills Manyata in front of Brinda making Brinda think it was Dev who killed her mother. Brinda vows to avenge her parents by killing Dev and his family.

1 year later, Vish gives Nayantara a new face and identity, Shalakha. Dev and Shalaka ger married. Brinda realizes that Dev did not kill Manyata. Shalakha finds out that Mundika is Vishakha's new identity. Dev asks Shalakha for divorce as he loves Brinda. Shalakha hypnotizes Dev to detach him from Brinda. Brinda's identity is revealed to Dev. Vishakha enters the Parikh house and murders the entire family under Brinda's disguise and spares Dev to obtain the Naagmani. Brinda finds out that Shalakha is Nayantara under a new identity. Shesha and Bela enter to assist Brinda. Vishakha is killed by Bela while Shalakha is killed by Shesha. Dev dies leaving Brinda devastated. The three perform a tandav to impress Lord Shiva who summons Naageshwari. She starts narrating her story from thousands of years ago.

=== Season 5 ===
The story starts in the era where eagles had the power to shape shift. When the eagles attacked the snakes, Lord Shiva blessed the shapeshifting ability to snakes and named the first naagin to get this power, Naageshwari. Naageshwari also gained the title of Sarvashresth Aadinaagin. She was in love with a naag Hriday while an eagle Aakesh was obsessed with her. Aakesh killed Hriday and Naageshwari stabbed herself to death. On completing the story, Dev is returned to life and he reunites with Brinda. Naageshwari says it's time for her next birth.

Ten thousand years later, Naageshwari is reincarnated as Bani. She meets Jay Mathur and they feel a connection. Veeranshu "Veer" Singhania, an eagle, is attracted to Bani while she immensely hates him. Bani and Jay perform a tandav, thus remembering their past lives where they learn that Bani is Sarvashresth Aadinaagin Naageshwari's reincarnation and that Jay is Hriday's reincarnation and Veer is Aakesh's reincarnation. Veer forcefully marries Bani as she killed his twin brother and Jay is soon to be revealed to be an antagonist who wants to gain Bani's powers. Bani wants to kill Veer's family but slowly starts to fall in love with him and soon Veer also remembers his past life. Bani releases Veer's mother who has been locked in a basement but soon Bani realizes that her mother-in-law is Maarkaat, Aadinaagin's greatest enemy. Bani realizes that Jay being the associate of Maarkaat and learns Jay being Veer's half brother. Bani, Veer and Jay team up to defeat Maarkaat and but Jay later Jay kills Maarkaat and gains the title of Maarkaat who then wishes to defeat Bani and Veer. Bani is pregnant and gives birth however she dies along with Veer, Jay is also killed by Bani's newborn.

=== Basant Panchami Special ===
On the occasion of Basant Panchami, Bani, Mihir, Shesha, Vishakha, and Priya fight against Trilok Sundari and snake charmers to save Sheshnaag's book.

=== Season 6 ===
Naagin Pratha and her sister Mahek enter the Gujral household to eliminate twenty traitors, the Asurs, who threaten India. Pratha marries Rishabh Gujral but soon discovers his mother, Seema Gujral, is a Maha Asur. After a violent confrontation leaves Seema in a coma, Pratha gives up her powers for her marriage, only to be betrayed by Mahek and Rishabh’s twin, Shakti. Framed for murder, imprisoned, and losing her unborn child, Pratha accepts her fate and falls into a coma.

A year later, Mahek deceives Rishabh into marriage and takes the title of Sarvashresth Shesh Naagin. Pratha awakens from her coma and vows to reclaim her rightful position. As Kiara Sharma, she infiltrates the Gujral house and eliminates her enemies. Mahek and Urvashi, Mahek's aunt, uncover her true identity. Pratha learns that her daughter is alive and in a final confrontation, defeats Mahek, reunites with Rishabh, and embraces her new life with their daughter, Anmol.

Twenty years later, Pratha is still the Sarvashresth Shesh Naagin, grappling with her daughter Prathna being the chosen one. Prathna was switched at birth, and her foster father is believed to have been murdered. Prathna suspects Rishabh and Rudra. Their paths cross when Prathna meets Pratha, and together they uncover the truth. Urvashi, Paatali, and Anmol manipulate the situation, leading to Pratha and Prathna being banished. Seeking revenge, they embark on a mission. Prathna acquires the nine Naagmani, while tragedy befalls Anmol and Paatali. Seema awakens from her coma and joins forces with Urvashi to resurrect Mahek. Chaos ensues during Prathna and Rudra's wedding as they vie for the Naagmani. In the ensuing battle, Pratha, Rishabh, and Rudra die.

Six years later, Mahek and Seema search for Prathna, who has lost her memories and is now known as Preeti. Mahek manipulates Preeti into marrying Raghuveer. As Preeti's memories resurface, Naagin Shesha aids her in seeking revenge, while Naagin Vishakha assisted Mahek in her quest for the nine Naagmani. Betrayal unfolded when Shesha turned against Prathna, allowing Mahek to acquire the coveted Naagmani. A mysterious serpent intervenes, revealing itself as Sheshnaag, Prathna's husband. He trap Sesha and Vishaka in Naaglok's jail. Together, they eliminate Seema and start a new life. Seven months later, Prathna discovers that Naaglok is beckoning her and Raghuveer. She gives birth to twin daughters, but Raghuveer blames Prathna for the loss of one. The deceased daughter has a new identity through adoption.

Five years later, Prathna combats a new conspiracy, discovering the creation of artificial shapeshifters called Sapolas. Raghuveer supports Prathna after misunderstanding her actions and they reunite with their both daughters. Meanwhile, Raghuveer's sister and Trisha along with Mahek, Patali and Professor Jeet attack Naaglok and try to kill everyone with Mahasapolas. In a climactic battle, Prathna saves innocent lives and vanquishes the mastermind Jeet behind the conspiracy. Prathna, Raghuveer and their daughters are killed by Mahek and Swarna, and they burn down the house, but Prathna takes a rebirth as Pragati.

Twenty years later, Pragati's fragmented memories resurface, and she seeks vengeance against Mahek and Swarna. Pragati enlists Raghav's help and together they confront Mahek. Pragati calls Pratha and Prathna from the past and they together kill off Mahek.

=== Season 7 ===
Purvi, disguised as Ahana, enters Suri's house to take revenge for her family's death and because Suri's family is from an enemy country of India that wishes to destroy it. Ahana kills seven of the twelve murderers. It is later revealed that Radhika, Aryaman's former lover, is a shape-shifting dragon and the elder sister of Ahana, who also seeks to destroy both Ahana and India. With the help of a map created by Aryaman's father, Ahana locates the Naagmani and attempts to eliminate the remaining murderers. Before she can complete her revenge, Aryaman intervenes and stops her, then Radhika uses the Naagmani to erase Ahana's memories. A few months later, Ahana, living as Apra, regains her memory and vows to kill Radhika and all the murderers. Ahana then learns that the Anant clan is cursed because of Sushantha and that she can undo the curse with the Naagmani and by marrying a naag. Later, on the night of the Blue Moon, both Ahana and Radhika perform taap, tandav, and tyag to obtain the Naagmani. Radhika also seeks help from Vishaka, who kills Bharani and Pratham. Ahana kills the remaining murderers and Erul, while Radhika sacrifices herself for Pragati and Ahana. Ahana obtains the Naagmani, and the Anant clan is freed from the curse. Six months later, Ahana is revealed to be pregnant with Aryaman's child.

== Cast ==
=== Main ===
- Mouni Roy as
  - Shivanya Singh (main Season 1; guest seasons 2–3): A Naagin from Sheshnaag Clan, Ritik's wife (2015–2016, 2019)
  - Shivangi Pratap Singh (main Season 2; guest Season 3): Mahanaagrani of Naaglok, Shivanya and Ritik's daughter (2016–2017, 2018, 2019)
- Arjun Bijlani as
  - Ritik Raheja / Yuvraj Singh (main Season 1; guest seasons 2–3): Prince of Suryavanshi Kingdom, Sangram's son (2015–2016, 2017, 2019)
  - Sangram Singh (recurring Season 1): King of Suryavanshi Kingdom, Yamini's brother (2016)
- Adaa Khan as Shesha/Ruchika (main seasons 1–2, Basant Panchami Special; guest seasons 3, 5–6): A Naagin from Sheshnaag Clan, Shivanya's cousin (2015–2017, 2019, 2020, 2022, 2023)
- Sudha Chandran as
  - Yamini Singh Raheja / Seema Gujral (main seasons 1–2; guest Season 3; recurring Season 6): Princess of Suryavanshi Kingdom, Sangram's sister. She later reincarnates as Maha Asur from Kalkeya Clan (2015–2017, 2019, 2022–2023)
  - Pataali (recurring Season 6): An Asur from Kalkeya Clan, Puloma's daughter (2022, 2023)
- Karanvir Bohra as Rocky Pratap Singh (main Season 2; guest Season 3): A Naag from Takshak Clan, Shivangi's husband (2016–2017, 2019)
- Kinshuk Mahajan as Rudra (main Season 2): A naag from Sheshnaag clan, friend of Shivangi. He was killed by Avantika
- Surbhi Jyoti as Bela Sehgal / Shravani Sippi (main Season 3; guest seasons 5): Naagrani of the Naaglok. She reincarnates as Shravani (2018–2019, 2020)
- Pearl V Puri as Mahir Sehgal / Mihir Sippi (main Season 3, Basant Panchami Special): Sumitra and Andy's son. He later reincarnates as Mihir (2018–2019, 2022)
- Anita Hassanandani as Vishakha (main Season 3–4, Basant Panchami Special; guest Season 5–7): A Naagin from Kaal Kuth Clan, Bela/Shravani's friend-turned-enemy. She is Taamsi's mother (2018–2019, 2020, 2022, 2023, 2026)
- Rajat Tokas as
  - Kabir (recurring Season 1): Shape-shifting mongoose, Tanvi's former groom and murderer
  - Vikrant (main Season 3): A naag from Nidhog clan, Sumitra's son
- Nia Sharma as Brinda Parekh (main Season 4; guest Season 5): A Naagin from Sheshnaag Clan, Manyata and Keshav's daughter (2019–2020)
- Vijayendra Kumeria as Dev Parekh (main Season 4; guest Season 5): Vrushali and Aakash's son, Brinda's husband (2019–2020)
- Jasmin Bhasin as Nayantara (main Season 4): Manyata's adopted daughter (2019–2020)
- Rashami Desai as
  - Shalaka (main Season 4; guest Season 5–6): Nayantara's new identity, Dev's ex-wife. A human who became a naagin after strict penance
  - Shanglira (guest Season 6): Vish Naagin, artificially created in the laboratory of Changistan
- Surbhi Chandna as Bani Singhania (main Season 5, Basant Panchami Special): Sarvashreshth Aadi Naagin from Sheshnaag Clan, Naageshwari's reincarnation (2020–2021, 2022)
- Sharad Malhotra as
  - Veeranshu "Veer" Singhania (main Season 5): A shapeshifting eagle, Prince of eagles, Akesh's reincarnation (2020–2021)
  - Teer Singhania (guest Season 5): Veer's twin brother (2020)
- Mohit Sehgal as Jay Mathur (main Season 5): Sarvashreshth Aadi Naag from Sheshnaag Clan, Hriday's reincarnation (2020–2021)
- Tejasswi Prakash as
  - Pratha Gujral (main Season 6): Former Sarvashreshth Shesh Naagin from Vasuki Clan, Mahek's sister (2022, 2023)
  - Prathna Ahlawat aka Preeti / Pragati Shukla (main Season 6; guest Season 7): Sarvashreshth Maha Shesh Naagin from Vasuki Clan, Pratha and Rishabh's daughter. She reincarnates as Pragati Shukla (2022–2023, 2025, 2026)
- Simba Nagpal as
  - Rishabh Gujral (main Season 6): An army officer-turned-businessman, Chanda and Lalit's elder son (2022)
  - Shakti Gujral (recurring Season 6): One of the five traitors, Chanda and Lalit's younger son (2022)
    - Amaan Aziz as Teenage Rishabh Shakti (2022)
- Mahek Chahal as Mahek Patel (main Season 6): Former Sarvashreshth Shesh Naagin from Vasuki Clan, Pratha's sister (2022–2023)
- Pratik Sehajpal as Rudra Raichand (main Season 6): Anmol's childhood friend, Prathna's ex-husband (2022)
- Shrey Mittal as Raghuveer Ahlawat (main Season 6): Former Sarvashresth Shesh Naag from Sheshnaag Clan, Prathna's husband (2022–2023)
- Vatsal Sheth as Raghav Shukla (main Season 6): Raghuveer's reincarnation, Pragati's husband (2023)
- Priyanka Chahar Choudhary as Purvi / Ahana (main Season 7): Queen of Anant clan (2025–2026)
- Namik Paul as Aryaman Suri (main Season 7): Parmeet's son (2025–2026)

=== Recurring ===
- Manish Khanna as
  - Ankush "Anky" Raheja (recurring Season 1): Former farmer, Akhilesh's twin brother. He was killed by Shesha
  - Akhilesh "Anky 2" Raheja (recurring Season 2): Ankush's twin brother. He was killed by Shivangi
- Aashka Goradia as Avantika (guest Season 1; recurring Season 2): A shape-shifting honeybee, Queen of Mahishmati Kingdom. She was killed by Shivangi
- Vishal Puri as Vikram (guest Season 1; recurring Season 2): Avantika's former general, a shape-shifting honey bee. He was killed by Shivangi
- Krishna Mukherjee as
  - Taamsi (recurring Season 3): The most powerful and dreaded demoness in the world, Vishakha and Hukum's daughter. She was killed by Bela
    - Aleena Lambe as young Taamsi
  - Priya (recurring Basant Panchami Special)

==== Season 1 ====
- Vimarsh Roshan as Viren Raheja: Akhilesh's son. He was killed by Shivanya
- Kapil Kumar as Shailesh Mathur: Ramya's husband. He was killed by Shivanya
- Mazher Sayed as Suri: Monisha's husband. He was killed by Shivanya
- Puja Sharma as Tanvi Mathur: Ramya and Shailesh's daughter
- Sharika Raina as Amrita Raheja: Yamini and Ankush's daughter
- Siddharth Shivpuri as Angad Raheja: Yamini and Ankush's son
- Swati Jain as Divya Raheja: Ankush's niece
- Jennifer Mistry Bansiwal / Karuna Verma as Ramya Mathur: Shailesh's wife
- Gunjan Walia as Chhaya Raheja: Viren's wife
- Priya Shinde as Monisha: Suri's third wife. She was killed by Yamini
- Rajeev Saxena as Katakka Bhairav/Gurudev: Shivanya and Shesha's mentor
- Kamalika Guha Thakurta as Guru Maa: Sorceress-cum-priestess. She was killed by Kabir

==== Season 2 ====
- Kalyani Chaitanya as Kapalika: An evil sorceress. She was killed by Shivangi
- Indresh Malik as Manav Nikunj: Mansi's brother. He was killed by Shivangi
- Pyumori Mehta Ghosh as Nidhi Nikunj: Manav's wife. She was killed by Shivangi
- Swati Anand as Manasi Nikunj Mehra: Manav's sister
- Aryan Pandit as Roumil Nikunj: Nidhi and Manav's son
- Manas Adhiya as Sushant Mehra: Mansi and Amar's son. He was killed by Shivangi
- Rutpanna Aishwarya Sethi as Avni Nikanj: Nidhi and Manav's daughter
- Shirin Sewani as Alia Mehra: Mansi and Amar's daughter
- Monica Sharma as Gautami Bhargava: Padmini and Anant's daughter. She was killed by Nidhi
- Rohit Sagar as Mahendra Pratap Singh: Vasudha's husband. He was one of the four murderers of Ritik
- Shagun Ajmani as Tanya: Manjusha and Ranbeer's daughter. She was killed by Shesha
- Jaineeraj Rajpurohit as Ranbeer: Manjusha's husband. He was killed by Shivangi
- Arzoo Govitrikar as Manjusha: Ranbeer's wife. She was killed by Shivangi
- Abha Parmar as Mata Tapaswini: Taksha's chief advisor

==== Season 3 ====
- Rakshanda Khan as Sumitra: A former naagin from Sheshnaag clan, then became Naagrani of Nidhog clan. Vikrant and Yuvraj's mother. She was killed by Bela
- Chetan Hansraj as Andy Sehgal: A business tycoon, Sumitra's husband
- Pavitra Punia as Poulomi Roy: Andy's mistress
- Puneett Chouksey as Aditya Sehgal: Poulomi and Andy's son
- Mithil Jain as Pratham Sehgal: Poulomi and Andy's son
- Ankit Mohan as Yuvraj Sehgal: An ichchadhari naag, Sumitra and Andy's son
- Sakshi Pradhan as Raavi Saluja: Yuvraj's former girlfriend
- Kushabh Manghani as Karan: Sehgal family's manager
- Deepali Kamath as Mukti Mittal: Andy's friend
- Naveen Sharma as Rehan Mittal: Mukti and Shekhar's son
- Heli Daruwala as Anu Mittal: Mukti and Shekhar's daughter
- Shahab Khan as Sunil Munshi: Sumitra's family's chief accountant
- Aman Gandhi as Daksh Munshi: Sunil's son
- Charvi Saraf as Suhani Munshi: Sunil's daughter
- Simran Sachdeva as Kuhu Sehgal: Sumitra and Andy's daughter
- Rohit Choudhary as Rohit Jaiswal: Kuhu's husband
- Rupesh Kataria as Bultu: Yuvraj's friend
- Heer Chopra as Sonal: Bultu's girlfriend
- Melanie Nazareth as Naagrani Maa: An ichchadhari naagin, Ruhi and Juhi's mother
- Roopali Prakash as Juhi: An ichchadhari naagin from Sheshnaag clan, Naagrani Maa's daughter
- Saptrishi Ghosh as Arvind: An ichchadhari naag from Sheshnaag clan
- Manoj Kolhatkar as Jagmohan Sharma: Naagrani Ruhi's chief advisor
- Adhvik Mahajan as ACP Ajitabh Singh: A police officer
- Aly Goni as Vyom: A shape-shifting vulture, Amrita's son
- Geetanjali Mishra as Amrita: A shape-shifting vulture
- Adish Vaidya as Amit: A shape-shifting vulture, Amrita's son
- Aditi Sharma as Rinky: A shape-shifting vulture, Amrita's daughter
- Mreenal Deshraj as Rohini: An ichchadhari naagin from Nidhog clan, Sumitra's younger sister
- Amit Dhawan as Alekh: An ichchadhari naag from Nidhog clan, Rohini's husband
- Nikitin Dheer as Hukum: An evil demon, Taamsi's father
- Anjali Gupta as Sarika: Shravani's mother
- Anjani Kumar Khanna as Manish: Shravani's father
- Deepak Wadhwa as Mohit Sippi: Kanika and Samarjeet's son
- Jiten Lalwani as Samarjeet Sippi: Kanika's husband
- Madhuri Pandey as Kanika Sippi: Samarjeet's wife
- Prachee Pathak as Ambar Sippi: Samarjeet's elder sister

==== Season 4 ====
- Sayantani Ghosh as Manyata: Naagrajkumari from Sheshnaag clan, Vividha's daughter. She was killed by Vishaka
- Geetanjali Tikekar as Vrushali Parekh: Aakash's wife. She was killed by Vishaka
- Rakhi Vijan as Ketki Parekh: Rasik's wife. She was killed by Vishaka
- Hetal Puniwala as Rasik Parekh: Baa's son. He was killed by Vishaka
- Aparna Kumar as Iravati Parekh: Madhav's wife. She was killed by Vishaka
- Sikandar Kharbanda as Madhav Parekh: Baa's son. He was killed by Brinda
- Swati Anand as Khyati Parekh: Baa's daughter
- Ankit Bathla as Rajat Malhotra: Brinda's ex-fiancé
- Farida Patel Venkat as "Baa": Aakash, Madhav, Rasik and Khyati's mother
- Sanjay Gandhi as Aakash Parekh: Baa's son
- Lakshay Khurana as Hardik Parekh: Ketki and Rasik's son. He was killed by Vishaka
- Kunal Singh as Manas Parekh: Khyati's son. He was killed by Vishaka
- Ankur Verma as Harsh Parekh: Iravati and Madhav's son. He was killed by Brinda
- Tushar Dhembla as Sparsh Parekh: Iravati and Madhav's son
- Manan Chaturvedi as Rohan Parekh: Aakash and Vrushali's son
- Himani Sahani as Lilly Parekh: Ketki and Rasik's daughter
- Parree Pande as Milly Parekh: Ketki and Rasik's daughter. She was killed by Vishaka
- Disha Kapoor as Geetanjali Parekh: Khyati's daughter. She was killed by Vishaka
- Mandeep Kumar as Mahesh Sharma: Priest of Parekh family
- Supriya Shukla as Swara Sharma: Mahesh's wife
- Ratnakar Nadkarni as Mahanjay Akappa Sethi/Baba: Manyata and Brinda's mentor
- Sanjay Gagnani as Prateek Raichand: Lilly's ex-boyfriend

==== Season 5 ====
- Parag Tyagi as King of the Cheel Clan/Balwant Singhania: Akesh and Veer, Teer, Tapish's father
- Aakash Talwar as Tapish Singhania: Balwant's son
- Dinesh Mehta as Pawan Singhania: Balwant's younger brother
- Utkarsh Gupta as Pankaj "Ponky" Singhania: Pawan's son
- Anurag Vyas as Monil Singhania: Pawan's son
- Suchit Vikram as Daksh Singhania: Pawan's son
- Swarda Thigale as Mayuri: A shape-shifting peafowl
- Ravee Gupta as Chandrakala Singhania (Maarkat): Balwant's wife
- Aishwarya Khare as Meera Singhania: Bani's adoptive sister
- Anjani Kumar Khanna as Shivayya Sharma: Meera, Dehek, Mehak's father
- Shivani Gosain as Ritu Sharma: Bani's adoptive mother
- Aahna Sharma as Dehek Sharma: Bani's adoptive sister
- Khushi Chaudhary as Mehak Sharma: Bani's adoptive sister
- Kamal Malik as Pandit: Lord Shiva's source
- Shreyas Pandit as Mahaguru: Lord Shiva's source
- Manorama Bhattishyam as Panditayan: Lord Shiva's source

==== Basant Panchami ====
- Amrapali Gupta as Rani Trilok Sundari

==== Season 6 ====
- Manit Joura as Professor Jeet Patel: Seema's son
- Bakul Thakkar as Lalit Gujral: Chanda and Seema's husband
- Urvashi Dholakia as Urvashi Kataria: A cursed naagin from the Vasuki Clan, Naageshwari's younger daughter
- Arjit Taneja/Akash Jagga as Farishta: An angel
- Mahru Sheikh as Kadru/Naageshwari: Former Sarvashreshth Shesh Naagin from Vasuki Clan, Puloma's sister
- Fatimah Begum as Pulooma: Former Queen of Kalkeya Clan, Naageshwari's sister
- Sneha Raikar as Chanda Gujral: Lalit's wife
- Abhishek Verma as Ritesh Gujral: Rishabh and Shakti's younger brother
- Gayathiri Iyer as Reem Kataria Gujral: Urvashi and Ankush's elder daughter
- Poulomi Das as Swarna Shukla: A naagin from Sheshnaag Clan, Yash's daughter
- Sanket Choukse as Inspector Ajay Shukla: Vijay's son
- Ajay Sharma as Sarvashreshth Naagraj Takshak: King of the Takshak snake clan
- S Ashraf Karim as Sundar Iyer: Meenakshi's husband
- Malini Kapoor as Meenakshi: Sundar's wife
- Lokesh Batta as Professor Prashant: Jeet's disciple
- Aarohi M Kumawat as Purvika Ahlawat: Sarvashreshth Sheshnaagrajkumari from Sheshnaag Clan, Prathna and Raghuveer's younger daughter
- Kevina Tak as Meher Ahlawat: Sarvashreshth Sheshnaagrajkumari from Sheshnaag Clan, Prathna and Raghuveer's elder daughter
- Sheeba Akashdeep as Manjeet Kaur: Manjit Singh's wife
- Digvijay Purohit as Manjit Singh: Manjeet Kaur's husband
- Shivani Jha as Mrignayni Ahlawat: A naagin from Sheshnaag Clan, Yash's daughter
- Aashvi Bisht as Naina: Prathna's adopted daughter
- Yash Acharya as Param: A shape-shifting mongoose, Rainaksh and Supreet's son
- Srikant Dwivedi as Sarvashreshth Anantnag: Yash and Samaira's brother
- Vaishnavi Ganatra as Tina: Prathna's adopted daughter
- Gautam Ahuja as Gautam: Prathna's foster brother
- Rushitaa Vaidya as Sonia Ahlawat: Raghuveer and Vinay's sister
- Neha Jurel as Trisha: A Naagin from Vasuki clan, Mahek and Jeet's daughter
- Yash Pandit as Vinay Ahlawat: A businessman, Raghuveer and Sonia's brother
- Amandeep Sidhu as Anmol Patel: An Asur from Kalkeya Clan, Professor Jeet's daughter
- Tushar Khanna as Yash: Former Sarvashreshth Shesh Naag, Pratha's destined husband
- Vishal Solanki as Rajesh Pratap Singh: Pratha's fake husband
- Jeyabhuben as Arjun/Varun Nair: Sarvashreshth Raj Naag from Vasuki Clan, Shivansh and Roopa's younger son
- Reema Worah as Radha Gujral: Puneet's wife
- Shoaib Ali as Vihaan Gujral: Puneet and Radha's elder son
- Pranav Kumar / Vishesh Sharma as Rehan Gujral: Puneet and Radha's younger son
- Nupur Dhariwal as Sheena Gujral: Seema and Lalit's daughter
- Srushti Tare as Ananya Gujral: Seema's maternal niece
- Abeer Singh Godhwani as Vijay Shukla: An inspector, Mahek's love interest
- Nandani Tiwari as Divya: Rajesh's younger sister
- Preeti Gandwani as Roopa: A Naagin from Vasuki clan, Naageshwari's elder daughter
- Amit Singh Thakur as Shivansh: Roopa's husband
- Lokesh Tilakdhari as Ankush Kataria: A minister, Urvashi's husband
- Aditi Shetty as Rhea Kataria: Urvashi and Ankush's younger daughter
- Pratibha Pooghat as Samaira: Yash and Anant's sister
- Ashish Trivedi as Mayank: Pratha's ex-fiancée
- Shivam Singh as an army officer, Rishabh's friend
- Ravi Chhabra as an army officer, Rishabh's friend
- Ashita Dhawan as Ashita: Mehak's sister-in-law
- Saurabh Agarwal as Ashita's husband

==== Season 7 ====
- Alice Kaushik as Bharani: A naagin, Pratham's wife, She was killed by Vishaka
- Kanika Mann as Radhika: Shape-shifting dragon and Ahana's older sister.
- Sahil Uppal as Vikram: Ahana's lover
- Eisha Singh as Ananta Arora
- Kshitij Dholakia as Pratham: Bharani's husband, He was killed by Vishaka
- Aashish Kaul as Parmeet Suri: Aryaman and Ravish's father, He was killed by Ahana
- Shamik Abbas as Baljeet Suri: one of the twelve murderers, He was killed by Ahana
- Bobby Parvez as Sameer: A minister, He was killed by Ahana
- Kushagre Dua / Vedaant Saluja as Ravish Suri: Parmeet's son, He was killed by Ahana
- Ribbhu Mehra as Karan Suri, He was killed by Ahana
- Mohit Jaswani as Arjun Suri, He was killed by Ahana
- Vibhuti Thakur as Dimple Suri, He was killed by Ahana
- Mannat Saudagar as Pammi Suri, She was killed by Ahana
- Neha Varma as Swarna Shukla, She was killed by Ahana
- Kapil Kumar as Mahasapera, He was killed by Ahana
- Akashdeep Saigal as Erul, He was killed by Ahana
- Aafreen Dabestani as Pinky Suri
- Aanchal Soni as Tina Suri
- Aastha Abhay as Nisha Suri
- Siddharth Sibal as Pratik Singh
- Mohit Duseja as Kapil

=== Guest ===
==== Season 1 ====
- Pranav Misshra as Arjun Mathur: Shailesh's nephew
- Gaurav Gera as Chutki: A fake transgender naagin created by Guru Maa
- Madhura Naik as Mayuri: Shape-shifting peafowl. She was killed by Shivanya
- Kaushal Kapoor as Kabir's fake father
- Shahnaz Rizwan as Kabir's fake mother
- Lavina Tandon as the girl who became possessed by Goddess Kali

==== Season 2 ====
- Malhar Pandya as Nishank: A naag from Sheshnaag clan, Shivanya's friend
- Pankaj Vishnu as Anant Bhargava: Ritik's friend
- Naazuk Lochan as Sapna Bhargava: Padmini and Anant's daughter
- Lalit Bisht as Aditya: Shivangi's former fiancé
- Vishal Bharadwaj as Shishupal: The real king of Mahishmati Kingdom
- Vineet Kumar Chaudhary as Mahish: A shape-shifting bison
- Vindhya Tiwari as Takshika: Former monarch of Takshak clan
- Anjali Ujawane as Uttara: A tribal woman with knowledge of witchcraft
- Shweta Dadhich as Vasudha Singh: A naagin from Takshak clan, Ritik's friend
- Rohan Gandotra as Anshuman: A naag from Sheshnag clan, Shivangi's friend

==== Season 3 ====
- Karishma Tanna as
  - Ruhi: Bela's former name, a naagin of Sheshnaag clan
  - Huzoor: A powerful demoness, Hukum's right hand
- Mahira Sharma as Jamini: A Chudail
- Prince Narula as Shahnawaz: A skilled sapera
- Sangeeta Chauhan as Avi: A stranger who helps Bela, Vishakha and Vikrant
- Aditi Sharma as Shivli: The girl chosen by Sumitra to marry Mahir
- Mreenal Deshraj as Rohini
- Khushwant Walia as Raj: Shivli's brother
- Mala Salariya as Mona: Raj's wife
- Zuber K. Khan as Ritvik: A paranormal investigator, Mahir's cousin
- Akash Rawat as Rohan: Mihir and Mohit's friend
- Sumit Wadhwa as Gaurav: Mihir and Mohit's friend
- Sanjay Swaraj as Maha Sapera: Mentor of Shahnawaz

==== Season 4 ====
- Shalin Bhanot as Keshav: Nanabhai and Madhulata's son, Aakash Parekh's friend
- Kaveri Ghosh as Nanabhai's wife
- Afreen Alvi as Billy Rathod: Ketki's niece. She was killed by Shalaka
- Nisha Nagpal as Ghumri: A shape-shifting owl, Brinda's helper
- Priya Tandon as Kanika Verma: Manas' ex-fiancé
- Richa Rathore as Priyal Singh: Manas's lover

==== Season 5 ====
- Hina Khan as Naageshwari: Sarvashreshth Aadi Naagin, the first and the most powerful Naagin
- Mohit Malhotra as Hriday: Aadi Naag, Naageshwari's love interest
- Dheeraj Dhoopar as
  - Akesh: Prince of cheels, Naageshwari's obsessive lover
  - Shakura: A shapeshifting cheel. Akesh/Veer's doppelganger
- Anjum Fakih as Noor: Bani's friend
- Simran Mahendrawal as Naina: A naagin from Sheshnaag clan, Abhishek's wife
- Shourya Lathar as Abhishek: A naag from Sheshnaag clan, Naina's husband
- Gaurav Wadhwa as Gautam Mathur: Jay's brother
- Mehak Ghai as Aarohi Mathur: Jay's sister
- Kajal Pisal as Adhira Mathur: Jay's paternal aunt
- Kiran Bhargava as Dolly Mathur: Jay's grandmother
- Shivanshu Sharma as Bobby: Mayuri's assistant
- Karan Taneja as Sunny: Mayuri's friend
- Priyamvada Kant as Chandani: Princess of the moon
- Arjit Taneja as Farishta: An angel
- Ami Neema as Monika: A girl appointed by Jay

==== Season 6 ====
- Shikha Singh as Riddhi Sharma: A police officer
- Sanjay Gagnani as Mahasapera
- Zeeshan Khan as Rainaksh: A shape-shifting mongoose, Seema and Bhanu's son
- Nitin Bhatia as Bhanu: A shape-shifting mongoose, Seema's ex-husband
- Eisha Singh as Bela Raichand: A fairy, Devlekha's reincarnation
- Shalin Bhanot as Ranav Raichand: A demon, Pratham's reincarnation
- Antara Biswas as Yamini Raichand: A demoness, Pataali's daughter
- Chetan Hansraj as Shekhar Raichand: Yamini's husband
- Shubhaavi Choksey as Queen of Fairy: Queen of Pari Lok, Devlekha's mother

==== Season 7 ====
- Karan Kundrra as Dr. Vishal Puri: A scientist
- Beena Banerjee as Uttara
- Pyumori Mehta Ghosh as Shalini Arora: Gurinder's wife
- Pankaj Vishnu as Gurinder Arora: Shalini's husband
- Vihan Verma as Rohan Arora: Ananta's brother
- Zayn Ibad Khan as Yaman
- Nibeditaa Paal as Roma
- Divya Agarwal as Sushantha

== Crossover ==
From 6 May to 13 May 2023, Naagin 6 had a crossover with Bekaboo, which is set in the same universe.

== Spin-off ==
Kuch Toh Hai: Naagin Ek Naye Rang Mein is a spin-off of Naagin 5, which takes place after the events of the latter.

== Reception ==
In its launch week, the series topped the ratings charts. Season One proved to be highly successful.

The second season also topped the ratings chart in its launch week and continued to do so.

Like the first 2 seasons, the third season also topped the ratings chart in its launch week and continued to do so for several months. But when the 3rd season was extended in January 2019, the season lost its top position in the TRP charts and even went out of the top 5 shows for several months but regained its top position in the last week.

The fourth season topped the rating charts for 2 months and later managed to remain in top 5 shows. However, because of the lockdown, the season's original story was scrapped and it had to wrap up within 8 episodes post lockdown since it was not as successful like the previous seasons.

Unlike previous seasons which consistently maintained its positions in top 5, season 5 since its respective third week of telecast, wasn't able to enter the top 5 Hindi GEC while its ratings dropped weekly. The ratings of the season dropped to an all-time low.

The sixth season had a successful 2 months, but later on, met with slight fluctuations in ratings due to time slot changes. It got multiple extensions due to its success and became the longest-running season of the franchise.

The seventh season debuted strongly and initially ranked among the top-rated Hindi television programmes, even reaching the number one position during its early weeks. However, ratings declined over time and the season later dropped out of the top five.

=== Rating ===
==== Season 2 ====
In the table below, the blue numbers represent the lowest ratings and the red numbers represent the highest ratings.

Year / Week	Episodes	Broadcast date	BARC ratings (Urban)	
Year / Week	Episodes	Broadcast date	Nationwide	Ranking (Nationwide)
Week 41, 2016	1 – 2	8 October 2016 – 9 October 2016	8.8% (8838)	1
Week 42, 2016	3 – 4	15 October 2016 – 16 October 2016	8.2% (8272)	1
Week 43, 2016	5 – 6	22 October 2016 – 23 October 2016	8% (7979)	1
Week 44, 2016	7 – 8	29 October 2016 – 30 October 2016	6.6% (6617)	2
Week 45, 2016	9 – 10	5 November 2016 – 6 November 2016	8.6% (8605)	1
Week 46, 2016	11 – 12	12 November 2016 – 13 November 2016	9.2% (9168)	1
Week 47, 2016	13 – 14	19 November 2016 – 15 November 2016	9.1% (9133)	1
Week 48, 2016	15 – 16	26 November 2016 – 27 November 2016	10.2% (10214)	1
Week 49, 2016	17 – 18	3 December 2016 – 4 December 2016	9.4% (9370)	1
Week 50, 2016	19 – 20	10 December 2016 – 11 December 2016	8.5% (8460)	1
Week 51, 2016	21 – 22	17 December 2016 – 18 December 2016	8.8% (8753)	2
Week 52, 2016	23 – 24	24 December 2016 – 25 December 2016	9.1% (9076)	1
Week 1, 2017	25 – 26	31 December 2016 – 1 January 2017	8% (7986)	1
Week 2, 2017	27	7 January 2017	8.4% (8414)	1
Week 3, 2017	28 – 29	14 January 2017 – 15 January 2017	7.4% (7410)	1
Week 4, 2017	30 – 31	21 January 2017 – 22 January 2017	7.3% (7297)	1
Week 5, 2017	32 – 33	28 January 2017 – 29 January 2017	7.4% (7416)	1
Week 6, 2017	34 – 35	4 February 2017 – 5 February 2017	8.1% (8126)	1
Week 7, 2017	36 – 37	11 February 2017 – 12 February 2017	7.4% (7377)	1
Week 8, 2017	38 – 39	18 February 2017 – 19 February 2017	7.9% (7940)	1
Week 9, 2017	40 – 41	25 February 2017 – 26 February 2017	7.8% (7829)	1
Week 10, 2017	42 – 43	4 March 2017 – 5 March 2017	7.1% (7113)	1
Week 11, 2017	44 – 45	11 March 2017 – 12 March 2017	7.7% (7732)	1
Week 12, 2017	46 – 47	18 March 2017 – 19 March 2017	7.69% (7690)	1
Week 13, 2017	48 – 49	25 March 2017 – 26 March 2017	7.9% (7987)	1

==== Season 3 ====
In the table below, the blue numbers represent the lowest ratings and the red numbers represent the highest ratings.

Year / Week	Episodes	Broadcast date	BARC ratings (Urban + Rural)	
Year / Week	Episodes	Broadcast date	Nationwide	Ranking (nationwide)
Week 23, 2018	1 – 2	2 June 2018 – 3 June 2018	16.5% (16545)	1
Week 24, 2018	3 – 4	9 June 2018 – 10 June 2018	14% (14103)	1
Week 25, 2018	5 – 6	16 June 2018 – 17 June 2018	14.5% (14559)	1
Week 26, 2018	7 – 8	23 June 2018 – 24 June 2018	14.5% (14579)	1
Week 27, 2018	9 – 10	30 June 2018 – 1 July 2018	14.3% (14374)	1
Week 28, 2018	11 – 12	7 July 2018 – 8 July 2018	13.9% (13910)	1
Week 29, 2018	13 – 14	14 July 2018 – 15 July 2018	15.5% (15466)	1
Week 30, 2018	15 – 16	21 July 2018 – 22 July 2018	15.8% (15818)	1
Week 31, 2018	17	28 July 2018	16.7% (16677)	1
Week 32, 2018	18 – 19	4 August 2018 – 5 August 2018	15.2% (15221)	1
Week 33, 2018	20 – 21	11 August 2018 – 12 August 2018	14.8% (14835)	1
Week 34, 2018	22 – 23	18 August 2018 – 19 August 2018	15.2% (15528)	1
Week 35, 2018	24 – 25	25 August 2018 – 26 August 2018	13.6% (13612)	1
Week 36, 2018	26 – 27	1 September 2018 – 2 September 2018	14.2% (14294)	1
Week 37, 2018	28 – 29	8 September 2018 – 9 September 2018	14.2% (14422)	1
Week 38, 2018	30 – 31	15 September 2018 – 16 September 2018	15.4% (15402)	1
Week 39, 2018	32 – 33	22 September 2018 – 23 September 2018	14.5% (14488)	1
Week 40, 2018	34 – 35	29 September 2018 – 30 September 2018	14.6% (14641)	1
Week 41, 2018	36 – 37	6 October 2018 – 7 October 2018	13.4% (13406)	1
Week 42, 2018	38 – 39	13 October 2018 – 14 October 2018	13.1% (13093)	1
Week 43, 2018	40 – 41	20 October 2018 – 21 October 2018	13.1% (13135)	1
Week 44, 2018	42 – 43	27 October 2018 – 28 October 2018	12.4% (12376)	2

==== Season 4 ====
In the table below, the blue numbers represent the lowest ratings and the red numbers represent the highest ratings.

Year / Week	Episodes	Broadcast date	BARC ratings (Urban)	
Year / Week	Episodes	Broadcast date	Nationwide	Ranking (nationwide)
Week 51, 2019	1-2	14 December 2019 – 15 December 2019	8.9% (8953)	1
Week 52, 2019	3-4	21 December 2019 – 22 December 2019	7.5% (7487)	2
Week 53, 2019	5-6	28 December 2019 – 29 December 2019	7.6% (7632)	3
Week 1, 2020	7-8	4 January 2020 – 5 January 2020	8.4% (8410)	1
Week 2, 2020	9-10	11 January 2020 – 12 January 2020	7.7% (7718)	2
Week 3, 2020	11-12	18 January 2020 – 19 January 2020	7.2% (7184)	3
Week 4, 2020	13-14	25 January 2020 – 26 January 2020	8.0% (8015)	2
Week 5, 2020	15-16	1 February 2020 – 2 February 2020	8.0% (8004)	2
Week 6, 2020	17-18	8 February 2020 – 9 February 2020	7.1% (7139)	2
Week 7, 2020	19-20	15 February 2020 – 16 February 2020	6.9% (6894)	5

==== Season 5 ====
In the table below, the blue numbers represent the lowest ratings and the red numbers represent the highest ratings.

Year / Week	Episodes	Broadcast date	BARC ratings (Urban)	
Year / Week	Episodes	Broadcast date	Nationwide	Ranking (nationwide)
Week 32, 2020	1	9 August 2020	6.2% (6163)	3
Week 33, 2020	2–3	15 August 2020 – 16 August 2020	5.7% (5758)	5

Unlike previous seasons which consistently maintained its positions in top 5, season 5 since its third week of telecast could not be able to enter top 5 Hindi GEC while its ratings dropped weekly.

==== Season 6 ====
In the table below, the blue numbers represent the lowest ratings and the red numbers represent the highest ratings.

Year / Week	Episodes	Broadcast date	BARC ratings (Urban)	
Year / Week	Episodes	Broadcast date	Impressions (in millions)	Ranking (nationwide)
Week 7, 2022	1-2	12 February 2022 – 13 February 2022	2.1	8
Week 8, 2022	3-4	19 February 2022 – 20 February 2022	2.0	8
Week 9, 2022	5-6	26 February 2022 – 27 February 2022	1.9	11
Week 10, 2022	7-8	5 March 2022 – 6 March 2022	2.2	5
Week 11, 2022	9-10	12 March 2022 – 13 March 2022	1.9	6
Week 26, 2022	39	26 June 2022	2.0	4
Week 49, 2022	85-86	3 December 2022 – 4 December 2022	1.7	7

==== Season 7 ====
In the table below, the blue numbers represent the lowest ratings and the red numbers represent the highest ratings.

Year / Week	Episodes	Broadcast date	BARC ratings (Urban)	
Year / Week	Episodes	Broadcast date	Impressions (in millions)	Ranking (nationwide)
Week 52, 2025	1-2	27 – 28 December 2025	2.1	2
Week 01, 2026	3-4	3 – 4 January 2026	2.1	2
Week 02, 2026	5-6	10 – 11 January 2026	1.9	3
Week 03, 2026	7-8	17 – 18 January 2026	2.4	1
Week 04, 2026	9-10	24 – 25 January 2026	2.1	3
Week 05, 2026	11-12	31 January – 1 February 2026	1.9	3
Week 06, 2026	13-14	7 – 8 February 2026	2.0	3
Week 07, 2026	15-16	14 – 15 February 2026	1.6	6
Week 08, 2026	17-18	21 – 22 February 2026	1.6	8
Week 09, 2026	19-20	28 February – 1 March 2026	1.6	5
Week 10, 2026	21-22	7 – 8 March 2026	1.4	10
Week 11, 2026	23-24	14 – 15 March 2026	1.7	6
Week 12, 2026	25-26	21 – 22 March 2026	1.6	8
Week 13, 2026	27-28	28 – 29 March 2026	1.5	9
Week 14, 2026	29-30	4 – 5 April 2026	1.5	10
Week 15, 2026	31-32	11 – 12 April 2026	1.5	9
Week 16, 2026	33-34	18 – 19 April 2026	1.4	9
Week 17, 2026	35-36	25 – 26 April 2026	1.4	9
Week 18, 2026	37-38	2 – 3 May 2026	1.4	7
Week 19, 2026	39-40	9 – 10 May 2026	1.4	7
Week 20, 2026	41-42	16 – 17 May 2026	1.3	10
Week 21, 2026	43-44	23 – 24 May 2026	1.5	6
Week 22, 2026	45-46	30 – 31 May 2026	1.2	12
Week 23, 2026	47-48	6 – 7 June 2026	1.5	4
Week 24, 2026	49-50	13 – 14 June 2026	1.6	4

== Soundtrack ==
Naagin: Tracklisting
No.	Title	Artist	Length
1.	"Kaun Hai Woh (Opening Theme)" (Duet)	Kailash Kher, Mounima	3:00
2.	"Tere Sang Pyaar Mein (season 1, 2, 3, 4, 5, 6)" (Female)	Pamela Jain	2:18
3.	"Tera Pyaar Jivan Ka (season 3, 4, 5)" (Female)	Pamela Jain	3:34
4.	"O Re Piya (season 1)" (Male)	Rahat Fateh Ali Khan	4:07
5.	"Bol Do Na Zara (season 3, 4, 5, 6)" (Male)	Armaan Malik	3:09
6.	"Kaise Hua (season 4, 5, 6)" (Male)	Vishal Mishra	2:48
7.	"Baarish (season 4)" (Duet)	Ash King, Shashaa Tirupati	2:49
8.	"Bulleya (season 4)" (Male)	Amit Mishra, Pritam	5.48
9.	"Dil Ibaddat (season 5)" (Male)	KK	5.29
10.	"Tose Naina (season 6)" (Male)	Arijit Singh	4.24

== Awards and nominations ==
Year	Award	Category	Recipient	Season	Result
2016	Gold Awards	Best Actress in Lead Role (Critics)	Adaa Khan	Season 1	Won
2016	Gold Awards	Best Actor in Lead Role (Critics)	Arjun Bijlani	Season 1	Won
2016	Gold Awards	Best Actress in Lead Role (Popular)	Mouni Roy	Season 1	Won
2016	Gold Awards	Best Crime/Thriller/VFX	Ekta Kapoor	Season 1	Won
2016	Gold Awards	Best Actor in Lead Role (Popular)	Arjun Bijlani	Season 1	Nominated
2016	Gold Awards	Best TV Show (Fiction)	Ekta Kapoor	Season 1	Nominated
2016	16th Indian Television Academy Awards	Best Actress in Lead Role (Popular)	Mouni Roy	Season 1	Won
2016	16th Indian Television Academy Awards	Best Serial (Popular)	Ekta Kapoor	Season 1	Won
2017	10th Boroplus Gold Awards	Best Actress in Negative Role (Critics)	Adaa Khan	Season 2	Won
2017	10th Boroplus Gold Awards	Boroplus Face of the Year	Mouni Roy	Season 2	Won
2017	10th Boroplus Gold Awards	Best Actress in Lead Role (Critics)	Mouni Roy	Season 2	Won
2017	10th Boroplus Gold Awards	Best Actor in Lead Role (Critics)	Karanvir Bohra	Season 2	Won
2017	10th Boroplus Gold Awards	Best TV Show Based on Crime/Thriller/VFX	Ekta Kapoor	Season 2	Won
2017	10th Boroplus Gold Awards	Best Actor in Lead Role (Popular)	Arjun Bijlani	Season 2	Nominated
2017	10th Boroplus Gold Awards	Best Actress in Lead Role (Popular)	Mouni Roy	Season 2	Nominated
2017	10th Boroplus Gold Awards	Best TV Show (Fiction)	Ekta Kapoor	Season 2	Nominated
2017	BIG Zee Entertainment Awards	BIG Zee Most Entertaining TV Actor (Female)	Mouni Roy	Season 2	Won
2017	BIG Zee Entertainment Awards	BIG Zee Most Entertaining TV Show (Fiction)	Ekta Kapoor	Season 2	Won
2017	BIG Zee Entertainment Awards	BIG Zee Most Entertaining TV Actor (Male)	Karanvir Bohra	Season 2	Nominated
2018	Indian Television Academy Awards	Best Actress (Jury)	Surbhi Jyoti	Season 3	Nominated
2018	Indian Television Academy Awards	Highest Rated Show on Television	Ekta Kapoor	Season 3	Won
2019	Indian Telly Awards	Best Actress in Supporting Role	Anita Hassanandani	Season 3	Won
2019	Indian Telly Awards	Best Actor In Lead Role Male (Popular)	Pearl V Puri	Season 3	Nominated
2019	Indian Telly Awards	Best Actor In Lead Role Female (Popular)	Surbhi Jyoti	Season 3	Nominated
2019	Indian Telly Awards	Best Jodi (Popular)	Pearl V Puri & Surbhi Jyoti	Season 3	Nominated
2019	Gold Awards	Best Actress in a Supporting Role	Anita Hassanandani	Season 3	Won
2019	Gold Awards	Best Actor in a Lead Role (Jury)	Pearl V Puri	Season 3	Won
2019	Gold Awards	Best Television Show (Thriller)	Ekta Kapoor	Season 3	Won
2019	Gold Awards	Best Actress in a Negative Role	Rakshandha Khan	Season 3	Nominated
2019	Gold Awards	Best Actor in a Negative Role	Rajat Tokas	Season 3	Nominated
2019	Gold Awards	Best Actress in a Lead Role (Popular)	Surbhi Jyoti	Season 3	Nominated
2019	Gold Awards	Best Actor in a Lead Role (Popular)	Pearl V Puri	Season 3	Nominated
2019	Gold Awards	Best On-screen Jodi	Surbhi Jyoti & Pearl V Puri	Season 3	Nominated
2019	Gold Awards	Best TV Show of the Year (Fiction)	Ekta Kapoor	Season 3	Nominated
2022	Indian Television Academy Awards	Best Actress (Popular)	Tejasswi Prakash	Season 6	Nominated
2022	Indian Television Academy Awards	Best Show(Popular)	Ekta Kapoor	Season 6	Nominated
2022	Indian Television Academy Awards	Best Actress in a Negative Role(Jury)	Mahek Chahal	Season 6	Nominated
2023	Indian Telly Awards	Fan Favorite Actress	Tejasswi Prakash	Season 6	Nominated
2023	Indian Telly Awards	Fan Favorite Show	Ekta Kapoor	Season 6	Nominated
2023	Indian Telly Awards	Fan Favorite Mytho/ Super Natural Show	Ekta Kapoor	Season 6	Nominated
2023	Indian Telly Awards	Fan Favorite Actor/ Actress - Mytho/ Super Natural	Tejasswi Prakash	Season 6	Nominated
2023	Indian Telly Awards	Best Actress in a Negative Role	Mahek Chahal	Season 6	Won
2023	Indian Telly Awards	Programming Awards - Weekly Serial	Ekta Kapoor	Season 6	Won
2023	Indian Television Academy Awards	Best Actress (Popular)	Tejasswi Prakash	Season 6	Won
2023	Indian Television Academy Awards	Best Show(Popular)	Ekta Kapoor	Season 6	Nominated
2023	Indian Television Academy Awards	Best Actress in a Negative Role(Jury)	Mahek Chahal	Season 6	Nominated
