= Kuch Toh Hai: Naagin Ek Naye Rang Mein =

Indian Hindi-language fantasy drama series

- Genre: Drama; Supernatural
- Created by: Ekta Kapoor
- Written by: Mrinal Jha
- Screenplay by: Surbhi Saral Sachdeva
- Story by: Mrinal Jha
- Directed by: Vikram Ghai
- Creative director: Mukta Dhond
- Starring: Krishna Mukherjee; Harsh Rajput
- Theme music composer: Binod Ghimire
- Opening theme: Tere Sang Pyaar Mein
- Country of origin: India
- Original language: Hindi
- No. of seasons: 1
- No. of episodes: 13

Production
- Executive producer: Shreya Shrivastava
- Producers: Ekta Kapoor; Shobha Kapoor
- Production location: Film City, Mumbai
- Cinematography: Dinesh Singh
- Animators: Bodhisatva Datta; Ink Bling Designs Pvt. Ltd.
- Camera setup: Multi-camera
- Running time: 41–51 min
- Production company: Balaji Telefilms

Original release
- Network: Colors TV
- Release: 7 February – 21 March 2021

Related
- Naagin 5

Kuch Toh Hai: Naagin Ek Naye Rang Mein (transl. There's something: female serpent in a new guise) is an Indian Hindi-language supernatural, fantasy, and thriller television series produced by Balaji Telefilms. It is a spin-off sequel series of Naagin 5. It starred Krishna Mukherjee and Harsh Rajput.

== Plot ==
The story is about Rehan a cursed vampire and Priya, a half-fairy hybrid.

Rehan, a cursed vampire living a human-like existence, harbors an aversion to light and an unfulfilled yearning for love. Priya, a half-fairy hybrid with extraordinary abilities, crosses paths with him in Mussoorie. Rehan seeks answers about his supernatural origins, while Priya searches for her missing parents. Though initially drawn to each other, both conceal their true identities. Unbeknownst to Priya, the Khurana family she resides with are her biological relatives. Her estranged mother Rageshwari, aware of their intertwined destinies, schemes to keep them apart, fearing Rehan's potential danger.

As their connection deepens, Priya discovers Rageshwari is her mother and Farishta her father but chooses silence to protect Rageshwari's reputation. Later, witnessing Rehan's vampiric form, Priya survives his unintended attack, protected by an unknown force. During a full moon, Rehan fully transforms into the Aadishaat (a superior vampire entity), coinciding with Swati and Arnav's engagement. When Priya plans to expose him, Rageshwari imprisons her, fearing Rehan's escalation. Amidst this chaos, Soumya and Mohit's engagement is announced, but Mohit confesses his love for Priya, prompting Rehan's confrontation.

Rehan apologizes for frightening Priya, professes loyalty to his sister Soumya, and devises a ruse: a fake engagement to deter Mohit. Priya agrees, demanding Rehan spare her family. However, under duress from Ajnabi, who kidnaps Rageshwari, Priya falsely claims love for Mohit, enraging Rehan. He takes her to a forest, kills her, and ascends to full Aadishaat power, erasing his memory in the process. Rageshwari resurrects Priya using antidotes derived from Shivanya, Shivangi, Bela, Brinda, and Bani, transforming Priya into a naagin (serpent-shifter) rivaling Rehan’s strength.

Seeking vengeance, Priya returns, manipulates Mohit into a marriage, and disrupts Soumya's wedding. Rehan imprisons Mohit, impersonates him, and unknowingly marries Priya in disguise. The Khuranas reluctantly accept her presence. Meanwhile, Pam murders Rageshwari and Soumya. After Soumya's death, Pam attempts to kill Rehan for his powers, but Priya intervenes. United, they defeat Pam. Choosing forgiveness, Rehan and Priya reconcile, vowing to rebuild their bond.

== Cast ==
=== Main ===
- Krishna Mukherjee as Priya Singhania/Raheja: A naagin from Sheshnaag Clan, initially, a hybrid human-fairy raised in an orphanage; Farishta and Rageshwari's daughter; Siddharth's step-daughter; Arushi, Roohi and Swati's half-sister; Rehan's wife; Veeranshu and Bani's daughter-in-law
- Harsh Rajput as Rehan Singhania/Raheja: A cursed Aadi Shaat; Veeranshu and Bani's son; Shashank and Pam's adoptive son; Arnav, Soumya and Mini's adoptive brother; Priya's husband; Farishta and Rageshwari's son-in-law

=== Recurring ===
- Resham Tipnis as Rageshwari Khurana: Siddharth's wife; Priya, Swati, Roohi, and Arushi's mother; Rehan and Arnav's mother-in-law; Farishta's ex-lover
- Maninee De as Pam Raheja: Shashank's wife; Soumya, Arnav, and Mini's mother; Rehan's adoptive mother; Swati's mother-in-law
- Nibedita Pal as Roohi Khurana: Rageshwari and Siddharth's second daughter; Swati's younger sister; Arushi's elder sister; Priya's half-sister
- Naveen Saini as Siddharth Khurana: Rageshwari's husband; Swati, Roohi, and Arushi's father; Priya's landlord and stepfather; Arnav's father-in-law
- Ankita Sahu as Swati Raheja (née Khurana): Rageshwari and Siddharth's eldest daughter; Roohi and Arushi's eldest sister; Priya's half-sister; Arnav's wife; Pam and Shashank's daughter-in-law
- Himani Sahani as Soumya Raheja: Pam and Shashank's elder daughter; Arnav and Mini's sister; Rehan's adoptive sister; Mohit's fiancee
- Akshay Bindra as Arnav Raheja: Pam and Shashank's son; Soumya and Mini's brother; Rehan's adoptive brother; Swati's husband; Rageshwari and Siddharth's son-in-law
- Kristina Patel as Mini: Pam and Shashank's younger daughter; Soumya and Arnav's sister; Rehan's adoptive sister; Arushi's bestfriend
- Ujjwal Rana as Shashank Raheja: Pam's husband; Soumya, Arnav, and Mini's father; Rehan's adoptive father; Swati's father-in-law
- Neha Tomar as Arushi "Aru" Khurana: Rageshwari and Siddharth's youngest daughter; Roohi and Swati's youngest sister; Mini's bestfriend
- Mohit Hiranandani as Mohit: Soumya's fiancé; Priya's obsessive lover
- Vedant Sharan as Dhruv: Priya's friend in the orphanage
- Aditi Shetty as Rehan's girlfriend
- Vaishali Thakkar as The head of orphanage: Priya's former guardian

=== Guest ===
- Surbhi Chandna as Bani Singhania: A Sarvashrest Aadi Naagin; Veeranshu's wife; Rehan's mother; Priya's mother-in-law; Rageshwari's friend
- Arjit Taneja as Farishta: A fairy; Priya's father; Rehan's father-in-law; Rageshwari's ex-lover

== Reception ==
Kuch Toh Hai - Naagin Ek Naye Rang Mein opened with an average TRP of 1.7, occupying 15th position in Hindi General Entertainment Channels.
