= Mahek Chahal =

Norwegian actress and model (born 1979)

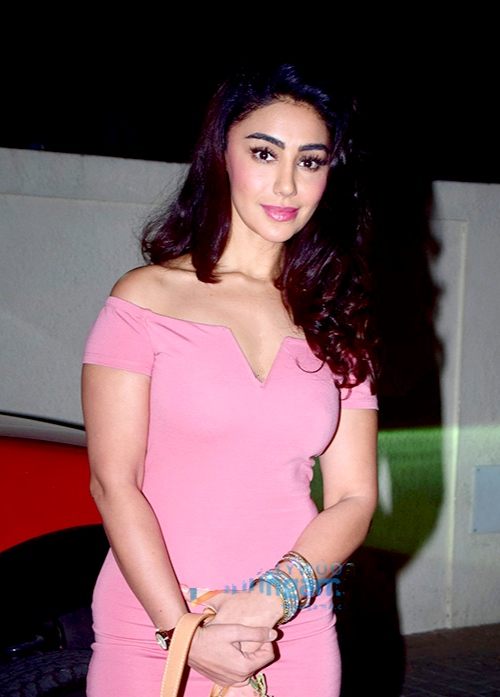
- Chahal in 2018
- Born: Raspreet Kaur Chahal; 1 February 1979 (age 47); Oslo, Norway
- Occupations: Actress; model
- Years active: 2002—present
- Known for: Kavach (Season 1); Bigg Boss 5 Naagin 6

Mahek Chahal (born 1 February 1979) is a Norwegian actress and model who works in Hindi films and television. She is known for her participation in the Colors TV reality show Bigg Boss 5 where she emerged as the runner-up. She also participated in stunt-based reality show Khatron Ke Khiladi 11. Chahal is best known for playing Naagin Mahek in Colors TV's supernatural franchise Naagin 6.

She began her acting career in 2002 with Telugu film Neetho and later made her Hindi debut with Nayee Padosan in 2003. She was also seen in several songs appearances for Hindi, Telugu, Punjabi Kannada and Tamil films. In 2011, Chahal participated in Colors TV reality show Bigg Boss 5 and emerged as the runner-up.

In 2021, she participated in stunt-based reality show Khatron Ke Khiladi 11. Chahal is best known for playing Mahek in Colors TV's supernatural franchise Naagin 6.

== Personal life ==
Chahal got engaged to actor Ashmit Patel in August 2017, but they called off their engagement in 2020.

== Career ==
=== Early work (2002–2011) ===
She made her film debut in 2002 with the Telugu film Neetho playing Shalini and later made Hindi debut with romantic-comedy Nayee Padosan playing Pooja Iyengar (A south Indian girl) the film was a moderate success at the box office. She also did item number in the film Chameli (2004). Chahal next performed in a Punjabi movie Dil Apna Punjabi playing Lisa Kaur.

In 2008, she was seen in supporting roles in Hindi films Wanted playing Shaina and Main Aurr Mrs Khanna playing Tia Roberts. She did several appearances in Tamil, Telugu and Hindi films. Chahal made her television debut with C.I.D. in 2009.

=== Bigg Boss and more (2011–2018) ===
In 2011, she was participated in Colors TV's reality show Bigg Boss in its 5th season where she survived fifteen weeks and emerged as the runner-up. Chahal was also featured in Norwegian reality show Fristet in same year.

She then did an item number in the comedy film Yamla Pagla Deewana (2011). She also starred in Karar: The Deal (2014). Chahal launched her clothing line Mahek Chahal clothing in Norway. She again appeared in Colors TV's reality show Bigg Boss Halla Bol in 2015 where she came as a Challenger. She stayed there three weeks until got evicted by facing public votes.

Chahal was also seen as contestant in Power couple along with Ashmit Patel. She then did item number in Tamil film Gethu and later appeared as guest in comedy show Comedy Nights Bachao.

In 2016, she was seen playing Manjulika, an antagonist, in Colors TV's supernatural thriller Kavach. In 2018 she was appererad in Hindi film Nirdosh. It was reported that she would appear as the dancer in Ek Thi Rani Ek Tha Raavan, but Sara Khan was cast for the cameo appearance.

=== Television comeback 2021–present ===
She was seen as contestant in stunt-based reality show Fear Factor: Khatron Ke Khiladi 11 which is film in Cape Town, South Africa where she finished at 11th place.

Recently, she was seen playing Shesh Naagin Mahek Gujral the antagonist in Ekta Kapoor's popular supernatural thriller franchise Naagin 6 on Colors TV. Naagin 6 turned out to be the longest running season of the popular franchise. For playing Mahek Gujral in Naagin 6, Chahal earned widespread acclaim and recognition. Her fierce looks and dialogue delivery made her character very popular among the audiences. For which she received numerous accolades including Indian Telly Award for Best Actress in a Negative Role Popular.

== Filmography ==
=== Films ===
Year	Title	Role	Language	Notes
2002	Neetho	Shalini	Telugu	
2003	Nayee Padosan	Pooja Iyengar	Hindi	
2005	Anjaan	Meneka	Hindi	
2006	Dil Apna Punjabi	Lisa Kaur	Punjabi	
2009	Wanted	Shaina	Hindi	
2009	Main Aurr Mrs Khanna	Tia Roberts	Hindi	
2009	Marega Salaa	Pooja	Hindi	
2010	Mumbai Cutting	Nisha	Hindi	
2014	Karar: The Deal	Nikita	Hindi	
2018	Nirdosh	Adaa	Hindi	

==== As dancer ====
Year	Title	Language	Notes
2004	Chameli	Hindi	Song: "Sajna Ve Sajna"
2007	Chhodon Naa Yaar	Hindi	Song: "Talwar Re"
2009	Jai Veeru	Hindi	Song: "Agre Ka Ghagra"
2010	Kedi	Telugu	Song: "Mu Mu Mudhante"
2011	Yamla Pagla Deewana	Hindi	Song: "Chamki Mast Jawaani"
2012	Bikram Singha: The Lion Is Back	Bengali	Song: "Na Champa Na Chameli"
2013	Jatt Airways	Punjabi	Song: "Ok Report"
2015	Mr. Airavata	Kannada	Song: "Ka Thalkattu"
2016	Gethu	Tamil	Song: "Mutta Bajji"

=== Television ===
Year	Title	Role	Notes
2009	C.I.D.	Herself	Guest
2011–2012	Bigg Boss 5	Contestant	1st runner-up
2015	Bigg Boss Halla Bol	Contestant	8th place
2015–2016	Power Couple	Contestant	6th place
2016	Darr Sabko Lagta Hai	Sukanya	
2016	Kavach	Manjulika Shah	Main role
2021	Fear Factor: Khatron Ke Khiladi 11	Contestant	11th place
2022–2023	Naagin 6	Mahek	Main role
2023	Bekaboo	Mahek	

== Awards ==
Year	Award	Category	Show	Result
2022	Indian Television Academy Awards	ITA Award for Best Actress in a Negative Role	Naagin 6	Nominated
2023	Indian Telly Awards	Best Actress in a Negative Role	Naagin 6	Won

== See also ==
- List of Hindi film actresses
- List of Indian television actresses
