= Shehzada Dhami =

Indian actor

- Born: 7 December 1996 (age 29); Punjab, India
- Occupation: Actor
- Years active: 2020–present
- Known for: Yeh Rishta Kya Kehlata Hai

Shehzada Dhami (born on 7 December 1996) is an Indian actor. He is known for his role in Yeh Rishta Kya Kehlata Hai, Shubh Shagun, Yehh jadu hai jinn ka and his participation in Bigg Boss 18.

== Career ==
Dhami started his career in 2020 with StarPlus's fantasy drama series Yehh Jadu Hai Jinn Ka!, where he played Rehan Khan. In 2021, he played Paramjeet "Param" Singh Gill in Colors TV's Choti Sarrdaarni, following its generation leap. However, he quit the series and In the same year, he released his first song which was self-titled as Shehzada.

In 2022, he played Shubh Jaiswal in Dangal TV's Shubh Shagun opposite Krishna Mukherjee. From 2023 to 2024, he played Armaan Poddar in StarPlus's Yeh Rishta Kya Kehlata Hai.

== Filmography ==
=== Television ===
Year	Title	Role	Notes	Ref.
2020	Mujhse Shaadi Karoge	Contestant		
2020	Yehh Jadu Hai Jinn Ka!	Rehan Ahmed Khan		
2021	Choti Sarrdaarni	Paramjeet "Param" Singh Gill		
2022	Shubh Shagun	Shubh Jaiswal	Lead role	
2023–2024	Yeh Rishta Kya Kehlata Hai	Armaan Poddar	Lead role	
2024	Bigg Boss 18	Contestant	19th place	

=== Music videos ===
Year	Title	Singer
2021	Shehzada	Himself
2021	Kismat	Misha Saharan
