= Shubh Shagun =

Indian drama television series

- Genre: Drama; Romance
- Developed by: Kundan Singh and Smita Thackeray
- Written by: Manasvi Arya (Dialogue)
- Story by: Mahesh Pandey, S. Manasvi (concept)
- Starring: Krishna Mukherjee; Shehzada Dhami
- Opening theme: Shubh Shagun
- Country of origin: India
- Original language: Hindi
- No. of seasons: 1
- No. of episodes: 157

Production
- Producers: Kundan Singh and Smita Thackeray
- Production location: Mumbai
- Running time: 20 to 21 min approx.
- Production companies: Rahul Media and Productions

Original release
- Release: 2 May – 31 October 2022

Shubh Shagun is an Indian drama series produced by Smita Thackeray, Swati Thanawala and Kundan Singh. launched under Rahul Media And Production LLP, broadcast on Dangal. It premiered on 2 May 2022 and ended abruptly on 31 October 2022 after completing 157 episodes and starred Krishna Mukherjee and Shehzada Dhami.

== Plot ==
Shubh Jaiswal is an arrogant, greedy businessman in Mumbai and Shagun Shinde is a devotee of Lord Ganesha who values her family more than anything. Shagun works in Shubh's factory.

The situation worsens when Shubh's younger sister Navya falls in love with Shagun's younger brother Yug. Due to their social differences, Shagun dislikes her, while Shubh tries to have Yug marry Navya and make him home-husband as he cannot deny his sister's wish. Shagun tries to have Yug marry Ria, younger sister of her fiancé, Ashok. Shubh later learns about it and kidnaps Shagun into the godown and tries to burn her, but she narrowly escapes. Shagun tells Yug about this, and he calls off his marriage with Navya, and both Shagun and Yug set off to marry Ashok and Ria, respectively. As the preparation begins Shubh and Navya replace the Ashok and Ria and Shagun marries Shubh and Yug marries Navya unknowingly. Yug comes as a househusband, while Shagun comes there for her brother. Shubh locks Shagun in a room and tries to kill her by bursting the air conditioner but later saves her.

Kanika's husband Brijesh Jaiswal tries to kill Shubh but Shubh is saved by Shagun. Shagun shows Brijesh's real face to the family. Naina, Shubh's mentally challenged first wife, enters the house and creates many problems inside the family. She also tries to separate Shubh from Shagun along with Navya and Bindiya but fails. Later, Shubh discovers her sister's plans and slaps her and blames her for trying to separate him from Shagun. Shagun realises her husband's sister's evil games, blames herself, and tries to kill herself by jumping off the building, but Shubh saves her and confesses his love for Shagun.

== Cast ==
=== Main ===
- Krishna Mukherjee as Shagun Shinde Jaiswal: Yug's sister; Shubh's wife (2022)
- Shehzada Dhami as Shubh Jaiswal: Navya and Mahi's cousin; Shagun's husband (2022)

=== Recurring ===
- Muohit Joushi as Yug Shinde: Shagun's brother; Navya's ex-husband; Mahi's love interest (2022)
- Kajol Srivastav as Navya Jaiswal: Brijesh and Kanika's daughter; Shubh and Mahi's cousin; Yug's ex-wife (2022)
- Vivana Singh as Bindiya Jaiswal: Vanraj's wife; Mahi's mother (2022)
- Chetan Hansraj as Brijesh Jaiswal; Kanika's husband and Navya's father (2022)
- Papiya Sengupta as Kanika Jaiswal; Brijesh's wife and Navya's mother (2022)
- Vandana Vithlani as Archana Shinde (2022)
- Jaydeep Singh as Vanraj Jaiswal; Bindiya's husband and Mahi's father (2022)
- Smita Dongre as Radha Shinde (2022)
- Anuradha Kanabar as Mrs. Jaiswal: Shubh and Navya's grandmother; Vanraj and Kanika's mother (2022)
- Ishita Ganguly as Naina Jaiswal: Shubh's first wife (2022)
- Mehul Kajaria as Dr. Ajay Khurana: Naina's doctor and partner in crime (2022)
- Khushwant Walia as Akash: Navya's boyfriend (2022)
- Mithil Jain as Dr. Karan: Shagun's psycho lover (2022)
- Syed Zafar Ali as Shekhar: Shubh's uncle; Kajal's husband (2022)
- Preeti Singhania as Mahi Jaiswal: Bindiya and Vanraj's daughter; Shubh's cousin; Yug's love interest (2022)
- Srushti Tare as Kajal: Shekhar's wife; Shubh's one-sided lover (2022)

== Controversies ==
In April 2024, Krishna Mukherjee made harassment allegations against show producer Kundan Singh and claimed that he had not cleared her dues. Following her allegations, Chetan Hansraj, another actor from the same show, also revealed that the producer had not cleared his payments.
