= Bekaboo =

2023 Indian TV series

- Genre: Supernatural; Fantasy
- Created by: Ekta Kapoor
- Developed by: Ekta Kapoor
- Screenplay by: Pallavi Lumba
- Directed by: Ranjan Kumar Singh
- Starring: Eisha Singh; Shalin Bhanot
- Theme music composer: Lalit Sen; Nawab Arzoo
- Country of origin: India
- Original language: Hindi
- No. of seasons: 2
- No. of episodes: 41

Production
- Producers: Ekta Kapoor; Shobha Kapoor
- Camera setup: Multi-camera
- Running time: 32-52 minutes
- Production company: Balaji Telefilms

Original release
- Network: Colors TV; JioCinema
- Release: 18 March – 6 August 2023

Related
- Naagin 6

Bekaboo (transl. Uncontrollable) is an Indian Hindi-language supernatural thriller television series that aired from 18 March 2023 to 9 July 2023 on Colors TV. The series starred Eisha Singh and Shalin Bhanot. From 15 July 2023 to 6 August 2023, the show was streamed on JioCinema with the title Bekaboo: Ishq-e-Anjaam.

== Series overview ==
| Season | Episodes | Originally released | |
| Season | Episodes | First released | Last released |
|---|---|---|---|
| 1 | 33 | March 18, 2023 | July 9, 2023 |
| 2 | 8 | July 15, 2023 | August 16, 2023 |

== Plot ==
=== Season 1 ===
In 1994 some friends entered a jungle. After ignoring an old man's warning, a demon eats them. The old man tells a man about the "seven worlds". The seventh world hell is inhabited by evil demons. One of the demons Valak was praying to Bhagwan Shiva to obtain the Asi Astra to relieve the curse of demons so they could roam freely in any world.

Parilok's crown princess Devlekha arrives on earth to break the meditation of Valak. To stop him, she creates a rift between the demon brothers Ashwat and Pratham, who were Valak's sons and were extremely close. Both demon brothers are attracted to Devlekha, who falls for Pratham.

Valak's youngest daughter Yamini discovers Devlekha's real identity as a fairy and uses this to manipulate the two brothers' emotions. Pratham confronts Devlekha about her identity, and she falsely accuses Pratham of molesting her; the result is a brawl between the brothers, causing Valak to leave his meditation incomplete.

Pratham takes revenge by disguising himself, marries Devlekha, and sleeps with her. He reprimands her for cheating Ashwat by hiding her real identity and breaking Valak’s penance. An angry and humiliated Devlekha curses him to die by her hands and to let his soul wander on earth until it obtains the body of someone related to him to obtain salvation. She stabs him and pushes him to earth leading to his death and kills herself for her lost honour.

The focus shifts to Ashwat's son Ranav and Devlekha's reincarnation as Bela in human forms, unaware of their supernatural powers as a demon and angel, respectively. Bela experiences flashbacks from her life as Devlekha but fails to understand her divinity. Whereas timid and naive Ranav is bullied by his cousins Aditya, Udit and Naksh who are Yamini's children. One day, the three brothers were trying to kill a girl and Ranav wanted to defend her. Out of anger, they beat Ranav to death, and his body becomes possessed by Pratham's spirit. Pratham seeks to know what happened to Ashwat and seeks revenge for both Ashwat and Ranav. Bela regains her memory as Devlekha and discovers that Ranav is a demon. Ranav decides to marry Bela's friend Mallika to teach Aditya a lesson whom Mallika loves. On the wedding day, Bela and Mallika replaces each other for which Mallika marries Aditya and Bela marries Ranav to take revenge for whatever happened in the past. He didn't accept Bela as his wife. Due to unforeseen circumstances, Ranav brings Bela home as his wife. Ranav soon learns of Ashwat's murder, and Bela decides to help Ranav in his revenge before killing him for her own revenge for his ill deeds in the last birth. There they meet Indrajeet, who, unbeknownst to them, is a demon. Indrajeet flirts with Bela, making Ranav jealous. Ranav finds Ashwat's cadaver in the garden of the hotel they were staying at. Shekhar informs Bela that Yamini was planning to take the Asi Astra from Ashwat by using Ranav when he was a child and killing Ashwat's wife. When Yamini goes to meet Ashwat, she finds him dead. Ranav learns this through Indrajeet (Yamini's minion) and sets out to find Yamini to discover the truth.

Later, Ranav and Yamini meet Pataali, who was revived by Naagin Mehak and her husband Jeet, who is an Asur. Pataali is Ashwat, Pratham, Vansh and Seema's mother and Yamini's adoptive mother. She meets Naagin Trisha, Mehak and Jeet's daughter who wanted to attack Naaglok. Bela helps Shesh Naagin Prarthana to find her daughter. Later, Yamini, Pataali, Mehak, and Trisha attack Naaglok with their army but are defeated by Prarthana, Raghu, Bela, and Rani Pari. Prarthana thanks Bela for her help and all return to earth.

Later, Paatali comes to Raichand's mansion with an intention. She joins forces with Yamini to learn who the pari is among Bela and Mallika. After several tests, Patali and Yamini assume them to be normal humans. Soon Paatali discovers that Pratham has possessed Ranav's body, and she asks Ranav to collaborate with her to find Ashwat's killer and then informs him that a pari must have killed Ashwat by showing him a kangan. She claims that whoever has the other piece of the bangle is the Pari and the murderer of Ashwat. While Ranav searches for the murderer of his brother, Pataali also tries to keep Ranav and Bela from getting closer with the help of Naira, Ranav's ex-lover.

One night, Ranav is attacked by a masked man named Naqabposh, also Ashwat's murderer. Ranav is injured, and Bela finds him in immense pain and wounded. In his last moments, he confesses to Bela about his secret of being a rakshas and discloses that he would only leave this body but not die, as Rakshas only die by suicide, not by someone else killing them. Ranav dies in Bela's arms, but Bela, out of love, feeds him her blood to revive him. Ranav wakes up much stronger after consuming Pari's blood and realizes that Bela is the crown princess Devlekha who had betrayed and killed Pratham in her previous birth. A confrontation takes place, and Ranav expels Bela and her mother from the Raichand house. The naqabposh, however, harms Bela and her mother, after which Ranav and Bela decide to fight the masked man together, as Bela discovers that the masked man also has powers similar to a fairy. But they do not know that the masked man is Deepa (Bela's mother), who was a pari herself and had been sent to Earth as a punishment from Pari Maa, after her scheme of trying to kill pari ma and taking over the Parilok came into light. Deepa had always hated Bela as she knew on Bela's birth itself that she had given birth to Devlekha. Later Yamini discovers that Bela is a pari and tries to kill her by drowning her in a lake as her fairy powers will not work in water. However, Ranav saves her, and they both realize they love each other. Ranav and Bela decide to marry each other, but Ranav discovers Deepa's secret identity. He realizes that Deepa is going to kill Bela, and he kills Deepa to save her. However, Bela misunderstands Ranav's intention, and to prove his love, Ranav kills himself. Bela returns to Parilok but later discovers Deepa's identity as a fairy and realizes that Ranav is not lying. Bela decides to save Ranav at any cost and goes to Hell to save Ranav. After a great struggle, Bela finally manages to keep Ranav and she sacrifices all her fairy powers to bring him back to life.

=== Season 2- Ishq-E-Anjaam ===
Bela return to the Raichand house. Ranav threatens his family members not to harm Bela ever, who is now a human. Later that night, Ranav and Bela consummate their marriage. The next day, Bela finds a note from Ranav to meet him in the jungle, where she finds Vijay, her ex-fiancé. Ranav kills Vijay before Bela and tells her he never actually loved her. It was all his plan to exact revenge, and she was foolish not to understand it. Bela is arrested and then admitted to a mental asylum. Bela later realizes she is pregnant and flees with the help of a nurse. Later, Bela gives birth to a dead child and vows vengeance on everyone responsible for her destruction. Bela enters the Raichand house posing as Sophia and kills Udit and Aditya. It is then revealed that the person who betrayed Bela was not Ranav, but Malak, Valak's evil twin brother posing as Ranav. It was the plan of Pataali. She and Malak kidnapped Ranav and then did it. On the other hand, Ranav believes that Bela has died in a fire and does not know what happened. However, his heart still believes that Sophia is Bela. Bela tries to find a way to kill Ranav but is stunned to see Malak with Pataali. Bela and Ranav soon find Valak meditating along with Asi Astra. Malak and Valak fight while Bela runs away with Asi Astra. Malak follows her and is about to kill her when Ranav saves her. Malak then reveals his treachery to Bela who feels guilty. Bela and Ranav confront each other and reveal whatever has happened to them in the past few months. A fight begins between Ranav, Valak, and Malak. Bela sacrifices herself to save Asi Astra from Malak. Pataali, who has a change of heart, kills Malak for killing Ashwat. Ranav follows Bela but soon Bela regains her powers as she fulfilled her responsibility as a fairy even when she was a human. Bela and Ranav reunite. It is revealed that Bela and Ranav's child is alive and is living with the fishermen.

== Cast ==
=== Main ===
- Eisha Singh as Bela Raichand: Devlekha's reincarnation. (2023)
- Shalin Bhanot as Ranav Raichand: A demon from hell. (2023)

=== Recurring ===
- Hrishikesh Pandey as
  - Valak Raichand: A demon from hell; Malak's twin brother. (2023)
  - Malak Raichand: A demon from hell; Valak's twin brother. (2023)
- Sudha Chandran as Paatali: Valak's wife. (2023)
- Antara Biswas as Yamini Raichand: Pataali's daughter from extramarital affair. (2023)
- Chetan Hansraj as Shekhar Raichand: Yamini's husband. (2023)
- Abhishek Kumar as Aditya Raichand: Yamini and Shekhar's eldest son. (2023)
- Viral Yadav as Udit Raichand: Yamini and Shekhar's second son. (2023)
- Rushal Parakh as Naksh Raichand: Yamini and Shekhar's youngest son. (2023)
- Himani Sahani as Mallika Sambiyal Raichand: Manoj's daughter. (2023)
- Sangeeta Balachandran as Mrs. Raichand: Shekhar's mother; (2023)
- Shubhaavi Choksey as Rani Pari: Queen of Parilok. (2023)
- Richa Soni as Deepa aka Nakabposh: Former fairy of Parilok. (2023)
- Bakul Thakkar as Arvind: Deepa's husband. (2023)
- Sanjay Swaraj as Manoj Sambiyal: A mayor. (2023)
- Neel Motwani as Vijay: Bela's ex-fiancé (2023)
- Nibeditaa Paal as Naira: Ranav's ex-girlfriend. (2023)
- Abhishek Kapoor as Indrajeet: A demon; Yamini's assistant (2023)
- Pravin Manjarekar as Daruk: A demon; Yamini's assistant (2023)
- Rohit Choudhary as Yatin Gandhi: A businessman from the UK; (2023)
- Ravi Jhankal as Kaka (2023)
- Nitin Bhatia as Kaka's grandson (2023)
- Roselin Sonia Gomes as Vansh's victim (2023)
- Nibeditaa Pal as Naira

=== Guest ===
- Shivangi Joshi as Rajpari Devlekha: Crown princess of Parilok; (2023)
- Zain Imam as Pratham Raichand: A demon from hell; Valak and Pataali's elder son; (2023)
- Karan Jotwani as Ashwat Raichand: A demon from hell; Valak and Pataali's second son; (2023)
- Arjit Taneja as Vansh Raichand: A demon from hell; Valak and Pataali's youngest son; (2023)
- Tejasswi Prakash as Prathna Ahlawat: Sarvashresth Maha Shesh Naagin from Vasuki clan from Naagin (2023)
- Shrey Mittal as Raghuveer Ahlawat: Sarvashresth Shesh Naag from Sheshnaag clan from Naagin (2023)
- Mahek Chahal as Mahek Patel: An evil Naagin from Vasuki clan from Naagin (2023)
- Poulomi Das as Swarna: A Naagin from the Sheshnaag clan from Naagin (2023)
- Shivani Jha as Mrignayni: An evil Naagin from the Sheshnaag clan from Naagin (2023)
- Neha Jurel as Trisha: An evil Naagin from the Vasuki clan from Naagin (2023)

== Production ==
=== Casting ===
Shalin Bhanot, Eisha Singh, and Monalisa were the lead actors. Initially, Mohsin Khan and Kushal Tandon were in talks to play a male lead.

Viral Yadav and Roselin Sonia Gomes were cast to portray a negative role, later joined by Karan Jotwani. The series also features Shivangi Joshi, Zain Imam and Arjit Taneja in cameo appearances.

=== Development ===
The series was announced by Balaji Telefilms for Colors TV in February 2023.Initially it's based on the Beauty and the Beast story by Disney, and eventually it becomes the spin-off Naagin 6, which focuses on demons and fairies.

=== Filming ===
Principal photography commenced in Mumbai in February 2023.

== Crossover ==
From 6 May to 13 May 2023, Bekaboo had a crossover with Naagin 6, which is set in the same universe.

== See also ==
- List of programmes broadcast by Colors TV
