= Shrey Mittal =

Indian actor (born 1995)

- Born: 22 February 1995 (age 31); Indore, Madhya Pradesh, India
- Occupation: Actor
- Years active: 2019–present
- Known for: Splitsvilla; Indiawaali Maa; Pishachini; Naagin 6

Shrey Mittal (born 22 February 1995) is an Indian actor and reality TV personality best known for winning the reality show Splitsvilla in 2020 and for his leading role in the Hindi-language television series Naagin 6 in 2022–2023. Hailing from Indore, Mittal studied film production at the Whistling Woods International institute in Mumbai and acting at the Lee Strasberg Theatre and Film Institute in Los Angeles. A versatile performer who has acted in Hindi television series, web series, and films, Mittal also ventured into film production in 2024 by launching his post-production studio, FX Fantasy.

== Career ==
Mittal first gained significant public attention by winning season 12 of the reality television show Splitsvilla in 2020. He subsequently acted in recurring roles in the television series Indiawaali Maa in 2020–2021 and Pishachini in 2022. Following this he starred in the popular television series Naagin 6 alongside actor Tejasswi Prakash, where he played a lead role for seven months (2022–2023).

Mittal has expressed a strong preference for acting roles that provide him with creative satisfaction, and has ventured into web series and films in addition to his television work. In 2024 he acted in a drama-comedy web series titled Social Disconnect that is directed by Karishma Kohli and also features actors Ileana D'Cruz, Vihaan Samat, and Anya Singh. He will make his film debut with the Hindi-language film Operation AMG, which is based on the 2022 Operation Ganga mission for evacuating Indian students from war-torn Ukraine.

Despite his successes, Mittal's career has faced challenges including project cancellations and delays that were particularly exacerbated by the COVID-19 pandemic. These setbacks, which occurred after his initial success in Splitsvilla, include a shelved project named Raah-e-Ishq and an unnamed action film that was ultimately not produced.

In 2024 Mittal launched his post-production studio, FX Fantasy. From December 2025 to February 2026, he portrayed Krish Khanna in Mangal Lakshmi, after a two year television hiatus.

== Filmography ==
=== Television ===
Year	Title	Role	Notes	Ref.
2019–2020	Splitsvilla	Himself	Winner, Season 12	
2020–2021	Indiawaali Maa	Akshay Gowda	Recurring role	
2022	Pishachini	Veer	Recurring role	
2022–2023	Naagin 6	Raghuveer Ahlawat	Lead role	
2023	Bekaboo	Raghuveer Ahlawat	Appeared in 3 crossover episodes of Naagin 6 and Bekaboo in May 2023	
2025–2026	Mangal Lakshmi	Krish Khanna		

=== Web series ===
Year	Title	Role	Notes	Ref.
2024	Social Disconnect			

=== Films ===
Year	Title	Role	Notes	Ref.
2024	Operation AMG			
