= Karar: The Deal =

- Directed by: Sabbir Khan
- Written by: Shashikiran B. Vadia
- Screenplay by: Shashikiran B. Vadia
- Produced by: Shashikiran B. Vadia
- Starring: Tarun Arora; Mahek Chahal; Jyothi Rana
- Cinematography: N Shakil
- Edited by: Rajeev Biswas
- Music by: All songs in the movie are re-mixes of old popular Hindi film songs by various artists.
- Production company: Shree Cine Arts
- Distributed by: Shree Cine Arts
- Release date: 21 February 2014
- Running time: 120 minutes
- Country: India
- Language: Hindi

Karar: The Deal (transl. Agreement: The Deal) is a 2014 Indian Hindi-language thriller film directed by Sabbir Khan and produced by Shashikiran B. Wadia under the banner of Shree Cine Arts. Though the CBFC certificate is dated 09-05-2007 (9th May 2007), the film was released on 21 February 2014 for reasons not known.

== Plot ==
In the film, a doctor (Aryan) and a nurse (Annie), who are employed to look after a rich old man in a wheelchair, plan to usurp his property and wealth. The old Dadaji incidentally wishes to get his granddaughter (Nikita) married to Dr. Aryan, as he likes him. Dadaji is on medical treatment by Dr. Aryan due to his heart ailment. He manages to convince Nikita to marry Dr Aryan. But even after marriage, Aryan continues his sexual acts with Annie. Nikita has a hole in her heart and cannot sustain shock and pressure. Aryan knows about this and takes advantage of her handicap. Nikita catches Aryan in his misdemeanour with Annie, but he blatantly continues with his shameless acts, threatening her that if Dadaji learns about the affair, he will die of shock.

Dadaji gets his will prepared naming Nikita as the heiress, and Aryan is shocked since he is interested in coveting the property and wealth; so he hatches a plan with Annie so that Nikita will die of shock naturally and Dadaji will also die due to the shock of Nikita's death. Aryan asks Annie to confide in Nikita and come close to her so that they can eliminate Aryan. In the process, Aryan smothers Annie and convinces Nikita that Annie is dead. They take the body in a suitcase and dump it in the sea. When Dadaji asks them about missing Annie, Aryan tells him that she has left the job and gone to her hometown. Later, Nikita feels that Annie's ghost has come to haunt her. Aryan convinces her that she is imagining things. She repeatedly tells Aryan to come clean and reveal the truth to the police but he manages to silence her.

One day, Nikita sees a dead woman's body and screams out when she sees her face. It is not Annie. Inspector (Kadar Khan), who is investigating the death, suspects Nikita's behavior. On his probing, Nikita informs him that the nurse Annie has been missing for nearly a week, but she did not file a missing report since she thought that the nurse had gone to her hometown and Nikita did not know her contact number.

One day, the Inspector comes to meet Aryan and Nikita and shows them the suitcase that was found in the sea. He found out that it belonged to them with the help of a card inside. On his asking to open the suitcase, Nikita does so, and they find it empty. Nikita is terrified and now she is convinced that Annie is alive. When Aryan is away, she gets a call from Annie that she is on her way to Nikita's mansion. Annie's arrival shocks Nikita and when Aryan also arrives, the suspense builds up. With the nonchalant attitude of Aryan, while talking to them, Annie realizes that he is a crook and a selfish man who is not interested in her and is using her like a pawn to achieve his goal. She joins Nikita to overpower Aryan but in the process, he grabs their throats to strangulate them to death together. He is shot from behind by Dadaji and the girls are saved. Dadaji shoots him repeatedly till he dies. The film ends with both girls dancing and enjoying themselves together, and Dadaji joins them in the fun in his wheelchair.

== Cast ==
- Tarun Arora as Dr. Aryan
- Mahek Chahal as Nikita
- Jyothi Rana as Annie, nurse
- Shashi Vadia as Nikita's Dadaji
- Salim Khan as Inspector Kadar Khan
