= Krishna Mukherjee =

Indian actress (born 1992)

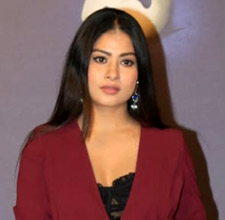
- Mukherjee in 2025
- Born: 12 August 1992 (age 33); Ludhiana, Punjab, India
- Occupation: Actress
- Years active: 2014–present
- Known for: Yeh Hai Mohabbatein
- Spouse: Chirag Batliwalla (m. 2023)

Krishna Mukherjee (born 12 August 1992) is an Indian actress who mainly works in Hindi television. She is best known for her portrayal of Aliya Aditya Bhalla in Yeh Hai Mohabbatein.

== Early and personal life ==
Mukherjee was born on 12 August 1992 in Ludhiana, Punjab to Vishwaroop Mukherjee and Ruby Mukherjee.

On 8 September 2022, Mukherjee got engaged in Manali to her longtime boyfriend Chirag Batliwalla, a Parsi sailor who is in Indian Merchant Navy. On 13 March 2023, they got married in Goa in a Bengali ceremony .

== Career ==
Mukherjee debuted with Jhalli Anjali as Sheela. She then appeared in Yeh Hai Aashiqui as Sanjana on Bindass opposite Reyansh Bhatia, and in Twist Wala Love as Arshiya.

Mukherjee joined Ekta Kapoor's Yeh Hai Mohabbatein, a Star Plus programme, in 2016 as Aliya opposite Abhishek Verma and Abhishek Malik, which proved to be her breakthrough role. Simultaneously, she also signed a negative role in Kapoor's another production, a supernatural fiction series Naagin 3, where she appeared in its last few episodes. She entered the show in May 2019 as Taamsi.

After the culmination of Yeh Hai Mohabbatein in December 2019, Mukherjee took a small hiatus from acting.

In January 2021, Kuch Toh Hai: Naagin Ek Naye Rang Mein, shortly known as Kuch Toh Hai, a spin-off of Naagin 5, was announced.

In 2022, she was seen as Priya Singhania opposite Harsh Rajput. She also worked in Dangal's Shubh Shagun opposite Shehzada Dhami.

== Filmography ==
=== Television ===
Year	Title	Role	Notes	Ref.
2014	Jhalli Anjali	Sheena		
2014	Yeh hai Aashiqui	Sanjana	Episode: Kidnapped	
2014	Twist Wala Love	Arshiya		
2015	MTV Big F	Jia	Episode: "Love is Fair"	
2015	Savdhaan India	Preeti	Episode: "The Criminal Couple"	
2015	C.I.D	Vishakha	Episode: "Dahej Ka Chakravyuh"	
2016–2019	Yeh Hai Mohabbatein	Aliya Raghav Bhalla		
2019	Naagin 3	Taamsi		
2021	Kuch Toh Hai: Naagin Ek Naye Rang Mein	Priya Raheja Singhania		
2022	Naagin: Basant Panchami Special	Priya Raheja Singhania		
2022	Shubh Shagun	Shagun Shubh Jaiswal		
2022	Hasratein	Jyoti	Episode: "Izzat"	
2022	Life Navrangi	Saloni		

=== Music videos ===
Year	Title	Singer	Ref.
2019	Black	Guru Randhawa	
2020	Ik Wari	Prabha Gill	
