= Indiawaali Maa =

Indian television series

- Genre: Drama
- Written by: Priya Mishra
- Screenplay by: Soumyava
- Directed by: Toton karmakar
- Creative director: Nitin Dhall
- Starring: Suchita Trivedi; Nitesh Pandey
- Opening theme: Mai Toh Maa Hu
- Country of origin: India
- Original language: Hindi
- No. of seasons: 1
- No. of episodes: 119

Production
- Producers: Jay Mehta; Kinnari Mehtaa
- Camera setup: Multi-camera
- Running time: 20–24 minutes
- Production company: Jay Production

Original release
- Network: Sony Entertainment Television
- Release: 31 August 2020 – 12 February 2021

Indiawaali Maa (transl. Indian mother) is an Indian television drama series produced by Jay Production on Sony Entertainment Television. It premiered on 31 August 2020 and aired its last episode on 12 February 2021. It starred Suchita Trivedi and Akshay Mhatre.

The series mainly focuses on the relationship between a mother and son played by Suchita Trivedi and Akshay Mhatre.

== Plot ==
It follows a story around the relationship of mother and son, Kaku and Rohan and the son's controversial romance.

Rohan and Cheenu return to India from New York after Rohan becomes a defaulter for a loan with his business not faring well there and stay in Bangalore. Unaware of his situation, Kaku visits him showing her motherly love for him while Cheenu wants her to go back as she doesn't like to live with her mother-in-law as a joint family and expresses it to Rohan who disagrees. Hearing this, Kaku is heartbroken. Soon, Cheenu realizes how true Kaku is and her motherly love. Cheenu discovers that she is pregnant and on the other side Rohan is getting calls for his loan and his office is taken from him. Rohan has no money to fulfill even regular home supplies and starts to send his mother as a cook and maid for money to his friends house and other connections. On discovering that Rohan takes money for Kakus work she is heartbroken yet continues her work to help Rohan. But then Cheenu finds out about this and is extremely angry with Rohan. Meanwhile, Rohan is arrested for not paying his debt of 2 crores within the stipulated time. Kaku and cheenu are shocked to learn about such a huge loan amount and kaku slaps rohan for lying to her about the loan amount. Cheenu is left heartbroken and wanders absent mindedly on the roads when she bumps into her childhood friend Akshay. Akshay helps Rohan to be released from the jail but somehow Rohan doesn't seem to like Akshay. Conflicts start between Rohan and Cheenu when Akshay enters in their lives. Rohan is jealous of Akshay. It is later unfolded that Akshay liked Cheenu and had even proposed her marriage. But Cheenu had politely refused because she loved Rohan. Rohan hadn't forgotten that and continues to harbour hatred for Akshay in his heart. Murthy is determined to remove Rohan from Cheenu's life. So he plans out a faulty and fake business venture for Rohan. He manages to convince Sagar, Rohan's business partner to plot against Rohan and put him into trouble by making him do the business of producing the same designs of the Venky studios and replacing the original label with a fake designer label. Kaku and rohan remain in the dark and get into massive trouble. Meanwhile, things are not very smooth between Rohan and Cheenu too. Cheenu thinks of helping Rohan financially because of which she accepts the job offer of akshay in his company. Rohan is infuriated to know this because of his insecurity. Kaku makes Rohan understand and Rohan is calmed down a bit. But deep down he still feels uneasy. Cheenu goes out on a business trip with Akshay when kaku and rohan get entangled into the mess created by Mr Murthy and Sagar. They had to burn down all their delivery stuff. Rohan and Kaku are arrested for fake business deals. But with the help of Chandraprabha, Kaku and Rohan are able to prove themselves innocent. But then a shocking news awaits them. Cheenu, on her way back to bangalore was feeling uneasy and her car met with an accident. Akshay took Cheenu to the hospital and informs Rohan and kaku about the same. Both of them are left shocked and petrified. Kaku runs to the hospital whereas rohan had to stay back into police station for completing some legal formalities. Cheenu faces a miscarriage because of the accident as she is left broken. Kaku's heart breaks on hearing this but she tries to remain strong in front of Cheenu because she could understand the terrible pain that cheenu is going through. When Rohan gets to know about Cheenu's miscarriage, he is shattered. He doesn't meet Cheenu in the hospital. He suffers from mental turmoil. When Cheenu questions him that why he did not meet her in the hospital, Rohan's huge outburst takes place. The emotionally shattered Rohan speaks harsh words to Cheenu and even blames her for voluntarily killing his child. He accuses her of murdering their baby so that she could get out of her relationship with Rohan and be with Akshay. Cheenu is left broken on hearing Rohan's baseless accusations. She had never imagined that the love of her life, Rohan would speak such harsh words to her and blame her for killing her own child. Rohan tore the Ultrasound report in front of Cheenu. Unable to bear such pain caused by Rohan, she decided to break up with him and leave the house. She vowed never to return in Rohan's life. Before leaving she requested Kaku to knock some senses into Rohan's head and even said that possibly there has been somewhere a loophole in the upbringing of Rohan. Kaku was left heart broken seeing her son and daughter falling apart. She tried to fix the ultrasound report and vowed to reunite Rohan and Cheenu. She went through many struggles, including trying to work at Cheenu's company. She finally gets her son and daughter together, and gets them married.

== Cast ==
=== Main ===
- Suchita Trivedi as Kaushalya 'Kaku' Gadhvi: Rohan's mother; Hasmukh's wife (2020–2021)
- Nitesh Pandey as Hasmukh 'Hasu' Gadhvi/Batuk Nath: Rohan's father; Kaku's husband (2020–2021)
- Akshay Mhatre as Rohan Gadhvi: Cheenamma's husband (2020–2021)
- Sheen Dass as Cheenamma "Cheenu" Gadhvi; née Murthy; Rohan's Wife (show ended abruptly, so it ended at wedding) (2020–2021)

=== Recurring ===
- Shrey Mittal as Akshay Gowda: Cheenamma's childhood friend, Rohan's rival (2020–2021)
- Prachi Singh as Keerti Rao (2020–2021)
- Abhishek Kumar as Sagar: Rohan's friend (2020–2021)
- Shubhanshi Singh Raghuvanshi as Meenamma Murthy: Cheenamma's sister (2020–2021)
- Sunil Singh as Vishwanathan Murthy: Cheenamma and Meenamma's father (2020-2021)
- Vandana Lalwani as Vasundhara Murthy: Cheenamma and Meenamma's stepmother (2020–2021)
- Apara Mehta as Kesar Maasi (Baa Maasi)
- Vikram Bham as Fawad
- Neeraj Khetarpal as Balwinder Ji

== Production ==
=== Development ===
After disconnecting Beyhadh2 The shooting studio of beyhadh2 starring Jennifer Winget, Ashish Chaudhary and Shivin Narang.. located on Mira road was acquired by this show The initial sequences of the series were scheduled to be filmed at London in early 2020 but was cancelled owing COVID-19 pandemic and the filming began at Mumbai in July 2020. This is Akshay and Sheen's second collaboration after their debut in Zee TV's Piyaa Albela.

"I play a selfless mother in the show, who does not want her son to come back after he goes abroad to study. She feels that just because you look after your children, does not mean that they need to come back and look after their parents. It should be the child’s choice if he/she wants to stay with the parents or not. So, I sort of connect with this character because I believe in selfless parenting."

— Suchita Trivedi

=== Release ===
The first promo of the series was released on 8 August 2020.
