= BOSS: Baap of Special Services =

2019 Hindi language web series

- Also known as: BOSS
- Genre: Action
- Created by: Filmy Paltan
- Developed by: Ekta Kapoor
- Written by: Ghalib Asad Bhopali
- Directed by: Ankush Bhatt
- Creative directors: Ashish Kapoor; Ankush Bhatt; Baljit Singh Chaddha
- Starring: Karan Singh Grover; Sagarika Ghatge
- Theme music composer: Palash Muchhal
- Opening theme: Boss - Title Track
- Ending theme: O Ri Chiraiya
- Country of origin: India
- Original language: Hindi
- No. of seasons: 1
- No. of episodes: 10

Production
- Executive producers: Aakaash Berry; Mayur Shah
- Producers: Ankush Bhatt; Ashish Kapoor; Ankur Ghai (ALTBalaji)
- Editors: Vikas Sharma; Sunil Bhattarai; Peter Gundra; Preshma Bagahar
- Camera setup: Multi-camera
- Running time: 21–35 minutes
- Production company: Filmy Paltan

Original release
- Release: 2 August 2019

BOSS: Baap of Special Services is a 2019 Hindi action and thriller web series. The series marks the Web debut of actor Karan Singh Grover and Sagarika Ghatge. The series was created by Filmy Paltan and developed by Ekta Kapoor. It is written by Ghalib Asad Bhopali and was directed by Ankush Bhatt. It was produced by Filmy Paltan and ALTBalaji, which is led by Ankush Bhatt, Ashish Kapoor and Ankur Ghai. The series also stars Ayaz Khan, Dalljiet Kaur, Gaurav Gera, Kanika Maheshwari, Sonali Raut, Karol Zine, Anveshi Jain, and Tarun Mahilani in key roles. It was made available for streaming on ALTBalaji and its associated platform on 2 August 2019.

== Premise ==
The series is based in Shimla's where an con-man inspector/detective Sudhir Kohli a.k.a. Keshav Khatri (played by Karan Singh Grover) who changes his identity to joins Shimla's Task Force to lead the team with ACP Sakshi Ranjan (played by Sagarika Ghatge) in solving criminal cases which make him the Boss - BAAP of Special Services because of his peculiar style.

== Synopsis ==
In Shimla, the crime rate suddenly rises beyond unexpected and the local doesn't co-operate with the Police. The Police Chief of Shimla appoints a special task force a team of five officers to control the crimes in the city. A specialist Officer was joined in the team from Delhi. A con-man changes his identity and join the special task force to find out his kidnapped daughter and the identity of balloon man.

== Cast ==
=== Main ===
- Karan Singh Grover as Sudhir Kohli/Keshav Khatri
- Sagarika Ghatge as ACP Sakshi Ranjan

=== Recurring ===
- Asma Siddhique as Pooja
- Anveshi Jain as Megha
- Ayaz Khan as Inspector Asif Malik
- Gaurav Gera as Jignesh, Keshav's friend
- Veer Aryan as Inspector Sudhir Kohli
- Tarun Mahilani as Inspector Janardhan 'Jonny' Bisht
- Kevina Tak as Pari, Keshav's daughter
- Jignesh Joshi as Inspector Pandey
- Opal Mehta as Shreya (chief's daughter)
- Ashok Kumar Mehta as Mahitosh Negi
- Ashmita as Suhasini Iyer, Head of Police Cyber Cell
- Mahesh Shetty as Rawat, Police Chief
- Dalljiet Kaur as Devki, Chief's Wife
- Pankaj Kalra as Gajendra Thakur
- Niyati Joshi as Lovely
- Gopi Singh as Jogi / Bhurelal
- Sudhir Rathi as Chaudhry
- Kanika Maheshwari as Safia
- Mazher Sayyad as Zakir
- Sunit Razdan as Lohiya
- Arti Gupra as Pratyusha
- Rishabh Jolly as Qureshi
- Karol Zine as Komal
- Rohit Gujjar as Aman Verma
- Vijay Kumar as Harishankar
- Amandeep Sohi as Devyani
- Anisa Butt as Tanya
- Atul Mathur as Safdar
- Rashika Pradhan as Avantika
- Naina Bahl as Ankita
- Darpan Srivastava as Veedhnath
- Nimesh Soni as Lallan
- Ruchit Tahiliani as Kitty
- Ankita Sahu as Shamita
- Khatija Iqbal as Tina
- Micckie Dudaney as Arjun
- Vinod Sharma as Mr.Mithani
- Mishal Raheja as Vicky Malhotra
- Ashmita Kaur Bakshi as Suhasini
- Simran Mishrikoti

== Episodes ==
No.	Title	Directed by	Written by	Original release date
1	"Behrupiya"	Ankush Bhatt	Ghalib Asad Bhopali	2 August 2019
The crime is rising increasingly in Shimla. The Chief of Police Force forms a special task force of five members to fight against crime. Inspector Sakshi Ranjan is set to lead this special force along with Inspector Sudhir Kohli, who is known for solve crime cases using his peculiar ways.
2	"Blackmail"	Ankush Bhatt	Ghalib Asad Bhopali	2 August 2019
Kohli and Sakshi begin their investigation on a murder case in the beautiful hill station of Shimla. They unearth the complicated connection between all the victim a blackmailer and a painting costing around lakhs. The painter's husband came out to be the culprit.
3	"Jaal"	Ankush Bhatt	Ghalib Asad Bhopali	2 August 2019
What looks like the death of an innocent new married man Aman Varma, turns out to be the member of sleazy desi porn network who search woman and then get married and after making clip leaves them. Kohli is onto the killer by employing his unusual means.
4	"Badlaa"	Ankush Bhatt	Ghalib Asad Bhopali	2 August 2019
When a five-year-old body of a dead woman. The inadequacies of Shimla police department's come to light. Inspector Pandey did not investigate the case properly and shut the case in context of missing. As she ran away with her lover. While investigating the case, Kohli gets himself imprisoned to find out more about Ramakant Jha.
5	"Mumbai Ka Thug"	Ankush Bhatt	Ghalib Asad Bhopali	2 August 2019
Kohli Recalls the series of events that changed his life a year ago. How he used to cheat people with his friends. Now, in Shimla, he finds a criminal connection to all that happened to him a year ago. He also learns the identity of the cop who inspected the car when his daughter went missing she was Sakshi. Lovely tells her about the incident what actually happened that night.
6	"Ittefaq"	Ankush Bhatt	Ghalib Asad Bhopali	2 August 2019
To solve the latest crime in the town Sakshi must approach the case with absolute objectivity. This time she is dealing with an old acquaintance and her possible love interest who was the suspect of the murder case previously and was acquainted from the case and was not proved guilty.
7	"Bandhe Haath"	Ankush Bhatt	Ghalib Asad Bhopali	2 August 2019
Kohli and Sakshi get kidnapped by a dangerous gang dealing in drugs as they move forward in the forest to investigate the case. They are notorious for murdering their victims. The entire police department fears this worst. But Sakshi and Kohli team up to fight this new crime.
8	"Woh Kaun Thi"	Ankush Bhatt	Ghalib Asad Bhopali	2 August 2019
Sakshi wakes up in an unknown bedroom beside a dead man. She has vague memories of the series of events that brought her here. Kohli and Sakshi decide to keep this incident to themselves till they investigate. But it was not possible as Pandey arrived at the residence against a complaint of loud noise by the neighbours. Could Sakshi have murdered the man?
9	"The Balloon Man"	Ankush Bhatt	Ghalib Asad Bhopali	2 August 2019
Sakshi learns that Sudhir Kohli is not a cop but an identity thief and a possible murderer. She proceeds to arrest him, but Keshav has a bigger motive behind his actions. But everyone wonders if real Sudhir Kohli is dead or alive? Meanwhile Kehsav has to release Sudhir Kohli due to the pressure of his landlord. And Sudhir Kohli sacrifices his life for Keshav so that he could save his daughter from the Balloon Man.
10	"Season Finale The Balloon Man Finale"	Ankush Bhatt	Ghalib Asad Bhopali	2 August 2019
Lovely help Sakshi to find out more about Balloon Man by informing about her social media profile. Meanwhile Keshav investigate about Balloon Man at a candy shop with a clue he picked from the crime spot. Sakshi and Keshav solve the mystery of the Balloon Man. Everyone is shocked to learn the reason behind the multiple murders that he committed. They even manage to trace Pari: Though Keshav is thankful to Sakshi for all the help, she arrests him, nevertheless.

== Soundtrack ==
BOSS: Baap of Special Services

Soundtrack album by Palash Muchhal
- Released: 2 August 2019
- Recorded: 2019
- Studio: Palash Studio
- Genre: Web series soundtrack
- Length: 4:23
- Label: ALT Entertainment
- Producers: Ekta Kapoor, Shobha Kapoor
External audio
- BOSS on YouTube

Track list

No.	Title	Singer(s)	Length
1.	"BOSS" (Title Track)	Amit Mishra, Palash Muchhal	2:45
2.	"O Ri Chiraiya" (Sad Duet)	Gauri Mishra, Yasser Desai	1:38
Total length:			4:23

== Production ==
=== Development ===
The web series was announced in the first week of March 2019 to be directed by Ankush Bhatt, starring Karan Singh Grover and Sagarika Ghatge.

The web series marks the fourth collaboration between Ekta Kapoor and Karan Singh Grover after Kitni Mast Hai Zindagi (2004) Kasautii Zindagii Kay (2005) and Kasautii Zindagii Kay (2019). It also marks the third collaboration between Ankush Bhatt and Grover after 3 Dev and Firrkie, which both not released It also marks the second collaboration between Grover and Ayaz Khan after Dill Mill Gayye (2007).

=== Filming ===
Principal photography commenced in Shimla with the lead actors Grover and Ghatge, and they had been spotted shooting on Monday 18 March 2019.

Director Ankush Bhatt announced the wrap up of the first schedule of "BOSS: Baap of Special Services" in Shimla using his Instagram post on 23 March 2019.

== Marketing and release ==
=== Release ===
BOSS: Baap of Special Services was scheduled for streaming on ALTBalaji app from 2 August 2019.

== Reception ==
Arushi Jain of The Indian Express stated that "Boss – Baap of Special Services streaming on AltBalaji is a full-on masala entertainer. Karan Singh Grover's comic timing and suspense behind him turning into a conman make it an easy binge.“ Ruchi Kaushal of Hindustan Times stated that "BOSS Baap of Special Services review: Karan Singh Grover’s web show has its merits but the sex will make you cringe"

== See also ==
- ALTBalaji original programming
