= Dangerous (Indian TV series) =

Indian crime thriller miniseries

- Promotional poster
- Genre: Thriller
- Written by: Vikram Bhatt
- Directed by: Bhushan Patel
- Starring: Bipasha Basu; Karan Singh Grover
- Composer: Mika Singh
- Country of origin: India
- Original language: Hindi
- No. of seasons: 1
- No. of episodes: 7

Production
- Producers: Vikram Bhatt; Mika Singh
- Cinematography: Naren Gedia
- Camera setup: Multi-camera
- Running time: 13–21 minutes

Original release
- Release: 14 August 2020

Dangerous is an Indian crime drama miniseries for MX Player originally written by Vikram Bhatt and directed by Bhushan Patel. The series marks the web debut of Bipasha Basu alongside Karan Singh Grover. It is co-produced by Mika Singh and Vikram Bhatt. The series also stars Sonali Raut, Natasha Suri, Suyyash Rai and Nitin Arora in key roles. It is available for streaming on the OTT platform MX Player from 14 August 2020.

== Premise ==
Aditya Dhanraj is a business tycoon whose life changes when his wife Dia goes missing. The drama deepens as Neha Singh, Aditya's former flame, enters as the investigating officer on the case.

== Synopsis ==
The series revolves around the life of Aditya Dhanraj (Karan Singh Grover), a young entrepreneur, who discovers that his wife Dia Dhanraj (Sonali Raut) has gone missing. He sets out to find his wife with the help of the police, only to discover that his ex-girlfriend Neha Singh (Bipasha Basu) will be investigating his case.

== Cast ==
- Bipasha Basu as Neha Singh
- Karan Singh Grover as Aditya Dhanraj
- Sonali Raut as Dia Dhanraj
- Shawar Ali as Vishal Vashisht
- Nathalia Kaur as Gauri (Jaggu's Assistant)
- Nitin Arora as Jaggu
- Puja Gupta

== Episodes ==
Season	Episodes	Originally released
1	7	August 14, 2020

=== Season 1 ===
No.	Title	Directed by	Written by	Original release date
1	"Chapter 1"	Bhushan Patel	Vikram Bhatt	14 August 2020
Soon after arriving in London, Neha Singh is assigned a missing persons case. The subject is Dia Dhanraj, whose husband is Indian millionaire Aditya Dhanraj, Neha's former lover. As the investigation opens, information about Aditya and Dia's troubled relationship comes to light.
2	"Chapter 2"	Bhushan Patel	Vikram Bhatt	14 August 2020
While Dia remains missing, her driver Vishal turns up in hospital with severe injuries. Vishal had bonded with Aditya, who had hired him to keep an eye on Dia. Soon after Vishal is admitted, Aditya receives a call demanding ransom for Dia’s release. Suspicions arise as evidence points to Aditya's involvement in the case.
3	"Chapter 3"	Bhushan Patel	Vikram Bhatt	14 August 2020
The police search Aditya’s house and find a bottle of antidepressants in Dia’s room, leading them to her psychiatrist. The psychiatrist reveals that Dia and Vishal have been having an affair.
4	"Chapter 4"	Bhushan Patel	Vikram Bhatt	14 August 2020
Another ransom call reveals the identity of the kidnapper and Aditya is shocked to find out that it is Vishal. As the two come face to face, Neha is caught in the crossfire.
5	"Chapter 5"	Bhushan Patel	Vikram Bhatt	14 August 2020
Aditya and Vishal arrange and perform the kidnapping exchange, but new information takes things in an unexpected direction.
6	"Chapter 6"	Bhushan Patel	Vikram Bhatt	14 August 2020
Neha and her team have laid out a detailed plan to catch Vishal, but while the plan is in progress, Neha learns something about Aditya which he had been hiding until now.
7	"Chapter 7"	Bhushan Patel	Vikram Bhatt	14 August 2020
Neha has uncovered dark secrets about Aditya that force her to choose between love and duty.

== Production ==
=== Development ===
The web series was announced in the last week of May 2018, to be directed by Bhushan Patel and starring Karan Singh Grover opposite Bipasha Basu. It was tentatively titled Aadat, written by Vikram Bhatt and produced by singer Mika Singh and Vikram Bhatt.

The series marks the web debut of actress Bipasha Basu and the second collaboration with her husband Karan Singh Grover after Alone (2015).

=== Filming ===
Principal photography commenced in London with lead actors Karan Singh Grover and Bipasha Basu, who had been spotted shooting on 27 September 2018.

== Soundtrack ==
Dangerous

Soundtrack album by Mika Singh
- Released: 14 August 2020
- Recorded: 2019
- Genre: Web series soundtrack
- Producers: Mika Singh, Vikram Bhatt
External audio
- Dangerous on YouTube

The music for Dangerous was composed by Mika Singh, with lyrics written by Kalim Sheikh, Hardik, Azeem Shirazi, Kunal and Pooja Saini. The first song, "Eyes Teri Katilana Hai", was released as a teaser on 10 August 2020.

Track list

No.	Title	Lyrics	Singer(s)	Length
1.	"Dangerous" (Title)	Kalim Sheikh	Mika Singh
2.	"Eyes Teri Katilana Hai" (Romantic)	Hardik	Mika Singh
3.	"Majnu" (Romantic)	Azeem Shirazi	Mika Singh
4.	"Mere Tum Nahi Ho" (Sad)	Kunal	Payal Dev
5.	"Mujhko Apni Jaan" (Duet)	Pooja Saini	Mika Singh and Iulia Vantur

== Marketing and release ==
=== Promotion ===
The official trailer of the web series was launched on 6 August 2020 by MX Player on YouTube.

=== Release ===
Dangerous was scheduled for streaming on OTT Platform MX Player from 14 August 2020.

== Reception ==
News18.com gave the series a rating of 1 star, saying that, "A bland and clichéd plot topped with forced sexual tension makes Karan Singh Grover and Bipasha Basu's Dangerous a rather tedious watch."

Nandini Ramnath of Scroll.in called the series "harmless."
