= Sonali Raut =

Indian actress and model (born 23 December 1990)

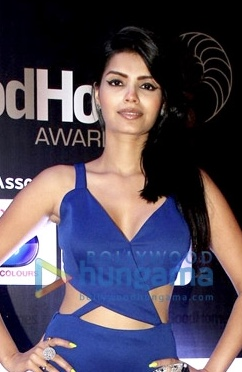
- Raut in March 2016
- Born: 23 December 1990 (age 35); Mumbai, Maharashtra, India
- Occupations: Actress; model
- Years active: 2010–present
- Known for: Bigg Boss 8
- Height: 1.76 m (5 ft 9 in)
- Relatives: Ujjwala Raut (sister)

Sonali Raut (born 23 December 1990) is an Indian actress and model who appears in Hindi films. She has been a Kingfisher Calendar Girl since 2010, and was 19 when she featured in the annual calendar. Raut made her acting debut with romantic-thriller film The Xpose in 2014 opposite Himesh Reshammiya and Yo Yo Honey Singh in a lead role. She was a contestant in the reality television show Bigg Boss 8 and Bigg Boss Marathi 6.

== Personal life ==
She is the younger sister of India's most successful overseas supermodel Ujjwala Raut. Her father is a deputy commissioner of police. She completed her graduation from Mithibai College, Mumbai.

== Career ==
In 2010, Raut won a modeling assignment in the annual Kingfisher Calendar, which features models in swimsuits. She was the face of MAC Cosmetics in India.

In 2011 she had done a sensational photoshoot with popular actor Ranveer Singh for Maxim magazine.

In 2014, Raut starred in the Bollywood film The Xposé opposite Himesh Reshammiya and Yo Yo Honey Singh in a lead role, playing the role of a movie star who is murdered. Popular film critic Taran Adarsh from Bollywood Hungama wrote that she looked glamorous and played her role with confidence. In an interview, she described Bollywood as "not very welcoming". She dropped a commitment to be in a film entitled 99% Useless Fellows, angering the Kannada film director S. K. Basheed, to act as a contestant in the Indian reality TV show Bigg Boss.

She became one of the contestants on Bigg Boss 8 and was evicted after a surprise vote decision, but was later brought back by the Bigg Boss because of her popularity. Then she was evicted, along with Puneet Issar, after 105 days.

Raut was offered the lead role in the film Hate Story 3 and was also offered a music video to mark the success of the series, she was the first choice for the film but She turned down Hate Story 3 as she wants to do roles that she can call her own.

In 2016, Raut was seen in the film Great Grand Masti in which she played Shiney. She was also seen in the item song of the film "Lipstick Laga Ke". The song 'Lipstick Laga Ke' had become so much popular and was one of the top 20 songs of 2016.

In the year 2017 she was signed as the cover for FFACE Fashion Calendar.

As of 2020, Raut has also signed action-thriller web series Dangerous opposite Karan Singh Grover directed by Bhushan Patel, produced by Mika Singh and written by Vikram Bhatt.

She has also signed Music Video “Sniper” with Singer Shaan.

She is currently a contestant in Bigg Boss Marathi 6.

== Filmography ==
=== Film ===
Year	Title	Role	Notes
2014	The Xposé	Zara Peter Fernandes	Lead role
2016	Great Grand Masti	Shiney	Special appearance in the song “Lipstick Laga ke”

=== Web series ===
Year	Name	Role	Language
2016	Love Life & Screw Ups	Kashish	Hindi
2020	Dangerous	Dia Dhanraj	Hindi

=== Music video appearances ===
Year	Song	Notes	Label
2020	"Sniper"	With Shaan	Shaan Music
2022	"Galtiyan"	With Neeti Mohan	White hill Beats
2024	"Balaam"	With Ayush Raina and Muskan kalyan	let's Get Louder

=== Television ===
Year	Name	Role	Notes	Ref(s)
2014	Comedy Nights with Kapil	Guest	Along with Himesh Reshammiya and Zoya Afroz to promote her film The Xposé	
2014–2015	Bigg Boss 8	Contestant	7th place Semifinalist Evicted Day 104	
2015	Killerr Karaoke Atka Toh Latkah	Contestant	Along with Yuvika Chaudhary, Ajaz Khan & Ashita Dhawan	
2015	Comedy Classes	Guest	Season 1 Episode 7	
2016	Box Cricket League	Contestant	In team Ahmedabad Express	
2026	Bigg Boss Marathi season 6	Contestant	20th Place; Evicted Day 21	
