= Sagarika Ghatge =

Indian actress and model

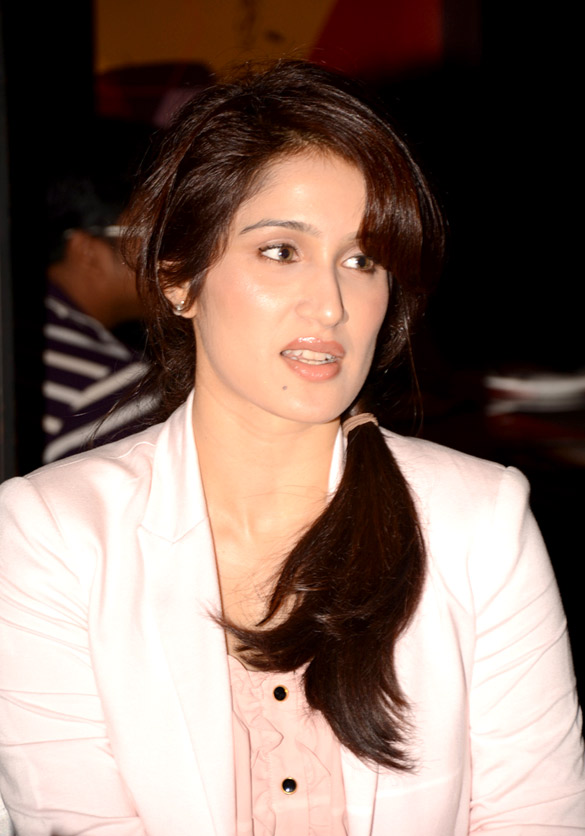
- Ghatge in 2012
- Born: 8 January 1986 (age 40); Kolhapur, Maharashtra, India
- Occupations: Model, film actress
- Years active: 2007–present
- Known for: Chak De! India
- Spouse: Zaheer Khan (m. 2017)
- Children: 1

Sagarika Ghatge is an Indian actress and model who primarily works in Hindi films. She is known for her role of Preeti Sabharwal in Chak De! India. In 2015, she participated in Fear Factor: Khatron Ke Khiladi 6 and emerged as a finalist. Ghatge is a national-level field hockey player.

== Early life ==
Ghatge was born to Urmila and Vijaysinh Ghatge in a Maharashtrian family in Kolhapur, Maharashtra. She then shifted to Ajmer, Rajasthan to attend Mayo College Girls School. She is related to a former royal house of India through Shahu Maharaj of Kolhapur, with her father being from the former royal family of Kagal and her grandmother, Sita Raje Ghatge, being the daughter of Tukojirao Holkar III of Indore. She has a brother. She was a national level hockey player.

== Career ==
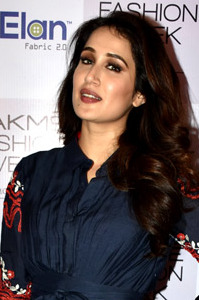
Ghatge in 2018

In 2007, Ghatge made her acting debut in Chak De! India, where she portrayed Preeti Sabharwal due to which she became the brand ambassador of Reebok India. She has appeared in fashion magazines and various fashion shows.

Ghatge then appeared in the 2009 film, Fox as Urvashi Mathur. She later portrayed Kamiah in Miley Naa Miley Hum. Ghatge then starred opposite Emraan Hashmi in the 2012 film Rush. She next appeared in Satish Rajwade's Premachi Goshta in 2013. This film, in which Ghatge appeared alongside Atul Kulkarni, was her first Marathi movie.

In 2015, she participated in Fear Factor: Khatron Ke Khiladi 9 and emerged as a finalist. Ghatge also made her Punjabi film debut, Dildariyaan opposite Jassi Gill where she portrayed Paali.

In 2017, she played Maya Singh in critically acclaimed Irada.

In 2019, she made her digital debut with ALT Balaji's BOSS: Baap of Special Services where she portrayed ACP Sakshi Ranjan opposite Karan Singh Grover.

== Personal life ==
On 24 April 2017, Ghatge announced her engagement to cricketer Zaheer Khan. The two got married in November 2017. The couple welcomed their first child, a boy, on 16 April 2025 and named him Fatehsinh Khan.

== Filmography ==
Key
†	Denotes films that have not yet been released

=== Films ===
All films are in Hindi unless otherwise noted.

Year	Title	Role	Notes	Ref.
2007	Chak De! India	Preeti Sabarwal		
2009	Fox	Urvashi Mathur		
2011	Miley Naa Miley Hum	Kamiah		
2012	Rush	Ahana Sharma		
2013	Premachi Goshta	Sonal	Marathi film	
2015	Dildariyaan	Paali	Punjabi film	
2017	Irada	Maya Singh		
2027	#SVC63 †	TBA	Filming	

=== Television ===
Year	Title	Role	Notes	Ref.
2015	Fear Factor: Khatron Ke Khiladi 6	Contestant	Finalist	
2020	Footfairy	Devika	Television film	

=== Web series ===
Year	Title	Role	Notes	Ref.
2019	BOSS: Baap of Special Services	ACP Sakshi Ranjan	ALT Balaji series	

== Awards and nominations ==
Year	Award	Category	Work	Result	Ref.
2008	Producers Guild Film Awards	Best Actress in a Supporting Role	Chak De! India	Nominated	
2008	Screen Awards	Best Supporting Actress	Chak De! India	Won	
2008	Stardust Awards	Superstar of Tomorrow – Female	Chak De! India	Nominated	
