= Rush (2012 film) =

- Directed by: Shamin Desai; Priyanka Desai
- Written by: Shamin Desai
- Story by: Shamin Desai
- Produced by: Mohammed Fasih; Shailendra Singh
- Starring: Emraan Hashmi; Neha Dhupia; Sagarika Ghatge; Aditya Pancholi; Rahul Singh
- Cinematography: Gary Shaw
- Edited by: Aarif Sheikh
- Music by: Songs: Pritam; Score: Tanuj Tiku
- Production company: Showman International
- Distributed by: Percept Pictures
- Release date: 26 October 2012
- Running time: 106 minutes
- Country: India
- Language: Hindi
- Budget: ₹180 million
- Box office: ₹46 million

Rush is a 2012 Indian Hindi-language crime thriller film directed by Shamin Desai and produced by Mohammed Fasih and Shailendra Singh. The film stars Emraan Hashmi, Aditya Pancholi, Neha Dhupia and Sagarika Ghatge.

The film released on 26 October 2012 on Dussehra. After the death of director Desai, the film was completed by his wife Priyanka Desai. It generally received negative reviews from critics and was declared a disaster at box-office.

== Plot ==
The story follows media, politics, crime, and sex at the point of life and death. Samar Grover (Emraan Hashmi) is a struggling news reporter. Even though his talk show is at the pinnacle of success, his personal life has turned upside down due to problems with his wife (Sagarika Ghatge). Seeing no way out, he accepts an assignment offered by a dynamic media tycoon named Lisa (Neha Dhupia), which he believes can make him millions. However, along with Lisa, one of India's richest men, Roger Khanna (Aditya Pancholi), they play a game on Samar, which plunges him into a vortex of violence in a deadly game of cat and mouse. Beneath the veneer of glamour, money, power, and the enviable life of media lays a truth that is at once unbelievable and shocking.

== Cast ==
- Emraan Hashmi as Samar Grover
- Neha Dhupia as Lisa Kapoor
- Sagarika Ghatge as Ahana Sharma
- Aditya Pancholi as Roger Khanna
- Murali Sharma as Shooter
- Rahul Singh as Kudo
- Ashok Banthia as Raja Choudhary

== Production ==
The film was announced in late 2010 by original director Desai. After casting Emraan Hashmi and Sagarika Ghatge, filming began under the title of Raftaar 24x7. However, after the death of director Desai in January 2011, the film was reported to be cancelled. In October 2011, Desai's wife Priyanka announced that she will be completing the film, and it was renamed to Play. In mid-2012, it was finally announced that the film has been completed, and will be titled Rush.

== Soundtrack ==
Rush

Studio album by Pritam
- Released: 8 October 2012
- Genre: Feature film soundtrack
- Label: T-Series
- Producer: Pritam

Pritam chronology
Barfi! (2012)	Rush (2012)	Race 2 (2013)

The soundtrack is composed by Pritam. It consists of 6 songs which were written by Sayeed Quadri, Kumaar, Ashish Pandit and Hard Kaur.

No.	Title	Singers	Length
1.	"Chup Chup Ke (Film Version)"	Ash King, Muazzam, Rizwan Ali Khan	3:51
2.	"Fukraa"	Jazzy B, Hard Kaur	2:48
3.	"Mumkin Nahi"	Tulsi Kumar, Anupam Amod	4:24
4.	"O Re Khuda"	Javed Basheer, Adnan Sami	4:16
5.	"Rab Ka Junoon"	Inderpreet Singh	3:45
6.	"Chup Chup Ke"	Shaan, Muazzam, Rizwan Ali Khan	3:49
Total length:			22 min 55 sec

=== Reception ===
The soundtrack received positive to average reviews from critics as well as public.

Happysing.com gave a very positive review saying, "Rush has some really good songs, chhup chhup ke and Mumkin Nahi are must listen. Rest aren’t bad too. Worth a try for all, and worth a buy if you’re a music lover." Suhail of Gomolo gave the soundtrack 4 out of 5 stars justifying the soundtrack as 'An Everlasting Package' with tracks that are too hard to drop-out. Rush soundtrack is a Highly outrageous travel!.

There were average reviews as well. One of them was given by Music Aloud who gave the album an average rating of "5.5 out of 10 stars" and commented, "After a superlative effort in Barfi, surprisingly unremarkable score from Pritam for Rush".

One of the negative review was given by Bollyspice.com who gave the album a negative rating of "2 out of 5 stars" and also commented that, "I found the soundtrack to Rush to be a frail attempt on Pritam’s part. After having recently composed some truly spectacular songs for his last album ‘Barfi!,’ Pritam has delivered here an album which has two great songs with the rest being very average."

== Release ==
Rush was to be initially released on 26 October but for some reasons it was then pre-poned to 24 October. However the film was again postponed from 24 to 26 October due to lot of films being released around the same time and the emergence of successful run of Karan Johar's Student of the Year. The film was finally released on 26 October 2012. Rush released in 850 cinemas across the entire country.

=== Critical reception ===
Professional ratings
Review scores
Source	Rating
Koimoi	1.5/5 stars
IBN Live	2/5 stars
Filmfare	3/5 stars
Rediff	1.5/5 stars
Bollywood Hungama	2/5 stars
Indian Express	2/5 stars
NDTV	3/5 stars
Mumbai Mirror	2/5 stars
Times of India	2.5/5 stars
Now Running	1/5 stars
Review Gang (critics)	3.5/10 stars
Review Gang (viewers)	7/10 stars

Rush received mostly negative to below average reviews. Apurv Bhatia of Koimoi gave it 1.5 stars "Rush is a half baked, uninspiring flick that evokes no response." wrote Apurv. Social Movie Rating site gave it a rating of 2.4 putting it in Below Average category. Taran Adarsh of Bollywood Hungama gave it 2 stars. Rohit Khilnani of Rediff gave it 1.5 stars.
