= Aakasame Haddu =

2011 Telugu film directed by Ravi Charan

- Official poster
- Directed by: Ravi Charan
- Starring: Navdeep; Rajeev Saluri; Panchi Bora
- Music by: Anand
- Release date: 9 September 2011
- Country: India
- Language: Telugu

Aakasame Haddu (transl. The sky's the limit) is a 2011 Indian Telugu-language romantic drama film directed by Ravi Charan and starring Navdeep, Rajeev Saluri and Panchi Bora.

== Cast ==
- Navdeep as Karthik
- Rajeev Saluri as Narayana
- Panchi Bora as Keerthi
- Monisa
- Tanikella Bharani as Keerthi's father
- Bhanu Chander as Narayana's father
- Rao Ramesh as College Principal
- Dharmavarapu Subrahmanyam as L. Wooda
- Suman Shetty as Aravindh
- Shashi as Sasi
- Chinni Kiran as Kiran
- Jeeva as Police Inspector
- Surekha Vani as College Professor
- Pragathi as Narayana's mother
- Sandhya Janak
- Allari Subhashini as Janu
- Venkatesh Maha as Narayana's friend

== Production ==
₹1.72 crore of Enforcement Directorate's loan funds were used to make this film. The film caused a loss of ₹54.64 crore.

== Reception ==
A critic from The Hindu wrote that "Not a bad watch at all and if you want to know why the film has been titled Aakasame Haddu (The sky's the limit), it is imperative that you wait till the film finishes".
