= The Xposé =

2014 Indian film by Anant Mahadevan

- Theatrical release poster
- Directed by: Anant Mahadevan
- Written by: Dialogues: Bunty Rathore
- Screenplay by: Himesh Reshammiya; Jainesh Ejradar
- Story by: Himesh Reshammiya
- Produced by: Vipin Reshammiya; Rakesh Upadhyay
- Starring: Himesh Reshammiya; Sonali Raut; Yo Yo Honey Singh; Zoya Afroz
- Narrated by: Irrfan Khan
- Cinematography: Maneesh Chandra Bhatt
- Edited by: Ashish Gaikar
- Music by: Songs: Himesh Reshammiya; Background Score: Sanjoy Chowdhury; Himesh Reshammiya
- Production company: HR Musik
- Distributed by: T-Series
- Release date: 16 May 2014
- Running time: 113 minutes
- Country: India
- Language: Hindi
- Budget: ₹150 million
- Box office: ₹200 million

The Xposé (stylized as The XPOSÉ) is a 2014 Indian Hindi-language period thriller film directed by Anant Mahadevan and produced by Vipin Reshammiya under the banner of HR Musik. Inspired by scandals in 1960s and 1970s Bollywood cinema, the film stars Himesh Reshammiya alongside newcomers Sonali Raut and Zoya Afroz, while Irrfan Khan makes a special appearance. Musician Yo Yo Honey Singh also appears in the film, making his Bollywood acting debut. It is the first installment in The Xposé Universe, followed by a spinoff, Badass Ravi Kumar, which was released on 7 February 2025.

== Plot ==
In 1960s Bombay, two actresses, Zara Fernandes and Chandni Roy, are both set to make their film debut on the same date. Chandni's film Reena Mera Naam becomes a box office success, whereas Zara's film Ujjwal Nirmal Sheetal is a flop. This angers Zara who believes she is higher and better than every other new actress. Zara starts an argument with Chandni after an awards party, and the two end up fighting. Later that night, Zara is murdered. The blame obviously goes towards Chandni, and she has no way to prove her innocence.

Chandni's lover, Ravi Kumar, decides to step in and find the real murderer to save his love. Ravi happens to be an ex-cop, who was sacked from his job as a police officer after shooting a parliamentarian. Ravi is now an actor, who happens to have debuted in the same film as Zara. The suspect list in the murder is extremely large, there is Virmaan, who is Chandni's ex-boyfriend, Subba Prasad who is Zara's film director and KD, a music director who had an affair with Zara, as well as many other suspects.

After Ravi's investigation, it turns out that after Zara and Chandni fought, Zara went up to the terrace where she met KD (hinting that their affair was still going on at the time of her death) and as the two got together, KD's wife Shabnam started looking for KD. KD heard Shabnam coming up to the terrace, so he tried to run away, and accidentally pushed Zara away from him, which led to her falling from the terrace. It also turns out that after falling down, she landed outside Subba Prasad's window. Subba decided to let her fall so her death could gain attention and maybe help their flop film be successful.

KD and Subba are convicted. KD is sentenced to 7 years, and Subba is given a life sentence in prison. After all the supposed suspects leave the court, Chandni confesses her love for Ravi. The two get together, and Ravi tells Chandni that, actually, he knew that she was the one who murdered Zara. In a flashback, it is revealed that after Subba let Zara fall down, she was still alive and was found by Chandni. Chandni was so frustrated and annoyed by her that she hit Zara on the head with a glass bottle, finally killing her.

== Cast ==
- Himesh Reshammiya as Ravi Kumar
- Sonali Raut as Zara Peter Fernandes
- Yo Yo Honey Singh as Kenny Damania (KD)
- Zoya Afroz as Chandni Roy
- Jesse Randhawa as Shabnam Rai
- Anant Mahadevan as Subba Prasad
- Rajesh Sharma as Inspector Raj Grover
- Bhagyashree as Madhubala
- Nakul Vaid as Virman Shah
- Kunal Thakkur as Ronnie
- Ashwin Dhar as Bobby Chadda
- Kanika Dang as D'Silva
- Supriya Karnik as Supriya
- Daya Shankar Pandey as Naidu

Special appearances

- Irrfan Khan as Alec D'Costa/Narrator
- Adil Hussain as Rajan Anna
- Rushad Rana as a prosecution lawyer
- Sanjay Mishra as an Announcer

== Music ==
The Xposé

Soundtrack album by Himesh Reshammiya
- Released: 21 April 2014
- Recorded: 2014
- Venue: Mumbai
- Genre: Film soundtrack
- Length: 1:19:55
- Language: Hindi
- Label: T-Series
- Producer: Himesh Reshammiya

Himesh Reshammiya chronology
A New Love Ishtory (2013)	The Xposé (2014)	Humshakals (2014)

=== Soundtrack ===
The soundtrack was composed by Himesh Reshammiya, with lyrics penned by Sameer, Kumaar and Shabbir Ahmed. Vocalists include Yo Yo Honey Singh, Reshammiya, Ankit Tiwari, Palak Muchhal. "Hai Apna Dil Toh Awaara" is an interpolation of the song of the same name by Hemant Kumar from the 1958 film Solva Saal. The soundtrack released on 14 April 2014 with The Times of India stating "An album that has something for everyone, The Xpose is masala magic at its most potent."

No.	Title	Writer(s)	Singer(s)	Length
1.	"Ice Cream Khaungi"	Shabbir Ahmed	Palak Muchhal, Himesh Reshammiya, Yo Yo Honey Singh	5:52
2.	"Dard Dilo Ke"	Sameer	Mohammad Irfan Ali	5:04
3.	"Hai Apna Dil Toh Awaara"	Sameer	Himesh Reshammiya, Yo Yo Honey Singh	4:24
4.	"Catch Me If You Can"	Shabbir Ahmed	Himesh Reshammiya, Mika Singh, Mohit Chauhan, Neeti Mohan, Shubhangi Tiwari, Shalmali Kholgade	5:06
5.	"Surroor"	Sameer	Himesh Reshammiya, Yo Yo Honey Singh, Shalmali Kholgade	5:32
6.	"Sheeshe Ka Samundar"	Sameer	Ankit Tiwari	4:42
7.	"Dard Dilo Ke (reprise)"	Sameer	Mohammad Irfan Ali, Neeti Mohan	4:44
8.	"Sheeshe Ka Samundar (reprise)"	Sameer	Rekha Bhardwaj	4:23
9.	"Ice Cream Khaungi (remix by Kiran Kamath)"	Shabbir Ahmed	Himesh Reshammiya, Yo Yo Honey Singh, Palak Muchhal	5:13
10.	"Dard Dilo Ke (remix by Kiran Kamath)"	Sameer	Mohammad Irfan Ali, Neeti Mohan	4:04
11.	"Hai Apna Dil Toh Awaara (Blue'S Mix)"	Sameer	Himesh Reshammiya, Yo Yo Honey Singh	3:19
12.	"Surroor (Arabic Mix)"	Sameer	Himesh Reshammiya, Yo Yo Honey Singh, Shalmali Kholgade	4:02
13.	"Catch Me If You Can (remix by Kiran Kamath)"	Shabbir Ahmed	Himesh Reshammiya, Mika Singh, Mohit Chauhan, Neeti Mohan, Shubhangi Tiwari, Shalmali Kholgade	4:13
14.	"Hai Apna Dil (Desi Remix)"	Sameer	Himesh Reshammiya, Yo Yo Honey Singh	4:18
15.	"Sheeshe Ka Samundar (remix by Kiran Kamath)"	Sameer	Ankit Tiwari	4:33
16.	"Surroor (remix by Kiran Kamath)"	Sameer	Himesh Reshammiya, Yo Yo Honey Singh, Shalmali Kholgade	3:49
17.	"Theme of Xposé"	Sameer	Neeti Mohan, Irrfan Khan	2:34
18.	"The Xposé (Mashup)"	Sameer, Shabbir Ahmed, Kumaar	DJ Kiran Kamath Ft Various Artists	4:04
Total length:				1:32:54

== Critical reception ==
=== Reception ===
Professional ratings
Review scores
Source	Rating
Bollywood Hungama	3/5 stars
Filmfare	4/5 stars
Deccan Chronicle	3.5/5 stars
NDTV	3.5/5 stars
Mumbai Mirror	3/5 stars
Mint	1/10 stars

Taran Adarsh of Bollywood Hungama rated the film 3/5 and concluded "an entertaining outing for fans of atypical Bollywood-style murder mysteries."

Mehul S. Thakkar of Deccan Chronicle gave it 3.5/5 stars stating "What also adds to the whole packaging of the film is the attention to minute detail of that era be it as minute as a ceiling lamp or a pen. R. K. Studios, a treasure house of antique items, have been credited to supply film cameras of those times for the shoot, shown as props in the film."

Subhash K. Jha reviewed the film for NDTV and gave it 3.5/5 stars stating "The suspense drama is bright, bouncy, believable and entertaining."

Rahul Desai for Mumbai Mirror gave 3 stars for its entertainment. Shrey Saxena of Mint rated it 1/10.

== Awards and nominations ==
BIG Star Entertainment Awards

Year	Category	Nominee	Status
2014	Best Music Director	Himesh Reshammiya	Nominated
2014	Best Playback Singer-Male	Mohammad Irfan Ali (for "Dard Dilo Ke")	Nominated

Life OK Now Awards

Year	Category	Nominee	Status
2014	Life OK Now Award for Best Actress	Zoya Afroz	Won
