= Vishnu (2003 film) =

- Directed by: Shaji Kailas
- Written by: Paruchuri Brothers
- Story by: Mohan Rao Duriki
- Produced by: Mohan Babu
- Starring: Manchu Vishnu; Ohanna Shivanand
- Cinematography: S. Saravanan
- Edited by: Gautham Raju
- Music by: Ismail Darbar
- Production company: Sri Lakshmi Prasanna Pictures
- Release date: 3 October 2003
- Running time: 180 minutes
- Country: India
- Language: Telugu

Vishnu is a 2003 Indian Telugu-language action romance film directed by Shaji Kailas (his Telugu debut) and starring Manchu Vishnu in his debut role and Shilpa Anand. It was produced by Mohan Babu. The screenplay is by Paruchuri Brothers, and the music is composed by Ismail Darbar. The film was released on 3 October 2003.

== Plot ==
Vishnu (Manchu Vishnu) meets his childhood love after fifteen years and tries to woo her without revealing his true identity. But it leads to a misunderstanding and her father fixes her marriage elsewhere.

== Cast ==
- Manchu Vishnu as Vishnu
- Ohanna Shivanand as Vaishnavi / Vedika
- Neetu Chandra as Teju, Vishnu's friend
- Brahmanandam
- Sai Kumar
- Giri Babu
- Chandra Mohan
- Jayasudha as Vishnu's mother
- Rajeev Kanakala
- Murali Mohan as Vishnu's father
- Siva Parvathi
- Telangana Shakuntala
- Chitram Srinu
- Dharmavarapu Subramanyam
- Tanikella Bharani
- Abhinaya Krishna
- Deepak Jethi
- Ramya Sri as Kanakam
- Raghu Babu

== Production ==
The film was in the news when Mohan Babu reportedly slapped Shilpa Shivanand for refusing to kiss Manchu Vishnu. He also allegedly beat up her mother. When Shilpa's sister in Bombay went to the Hyderabad Police to report his misconduct, there was nobody present at the film studio. The song "Vandanam" was shot in Tirupathi.

== Soundtrack ==
Song	Singer(s)	Lyricist
"Are Are Mama"	Udit Narayan	Guru Charan
"Happy Happy"	Udit Narayan, Sukhwinder Singh	Guru Charan
"Nee Pere Thana Paina"	Sonu Nigam, Sadhana Sargam	Suddala Ashok Teja
"Nelluri Nerajana"	KK, Kavita Krishnamurti	Guru Charan
"Oka Saari"	Udit Narayan, Kavita Krishnamurti	Guru Charan
"Ravoyee Chandamama"	Udit Narayan, Sadhana Sargam	Suddala Ashokteja
"Vandanam"	Shankar Mahadevan	Bhuvana Chandra

== Reception ==
Jeevi of Idlebrain.com rated the film 3/5 and wrote "The taking of director Shaji Kailas is good in parts" and concluded that "You may watch this film for Vishnu's performance".
