= Ohanna Shivanand =

Indian model, television and film actress (born 1982)

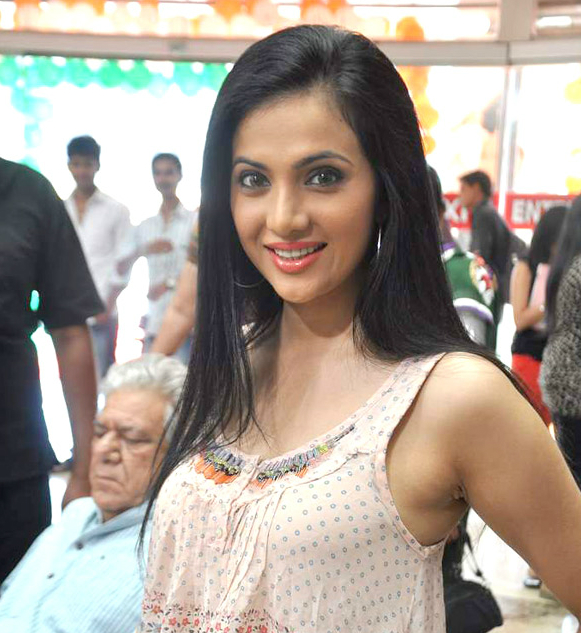
- Shivanand at location shoot of film Ye Hai Lollipop
- Born: Shilpa Shivanand; 10 December 1982 (age 43); South Africa
- Education: Masters Degree in Computer Applications (MCA)
- Occupations: Model; Actress; Software developer
- Years active: 2002–2016
- Relatives: Sakshi Shivanand (sister)

Ohanna Shivanand (born Shilpa Shivanand, 10 December 1982) is an Indian model and actress, who is known for her two different television roles as Dr. Riddhima Gupta and Dr. Shilpa Malhotra in Dill Mill Gayye. She has also starred in Indian films like Vishnu, also appeared in Music videos and television commercials. She was last seen in Bollywood film Yeh Hai Lollipop (2016).

== Early life ==
Shivanand was born on 10 December 1982 in South Africa and did her schooling there. Her parents were from India, and later she moved there. In 2015, she changed her name to Ohanna Shivanand. In an Interview, she stated that:

I always wanted to have a unique name and Shilpa is a very common name. Also, my original surname is Shivanand only. So 'Ohanna' which means God's precious gift or family is also as per my astrological star and this name suits me. Astrology is not the main reason, but yes it is one of the reasons.

She is the younger sister of Sakshi Shivanand, who is also an actress. Shivanand obtaining a Masters in Computer Applications (MCA), from 2000 to 2003. She worked as a software developer for five years, with Java J2EE application development and E-Learning.

== Career ==
Shivanand started her career as a model. She has done over 40 commercials, including for Coca-Cola with Aamir Khan, Lux soap with Aishwarya Rai Bachchan, and Dabur Pudin Hara and Nerolac Paint with Amitabh Bachchan. She has also worked as a model advertising a variety of brands.

Shivanand made her acting debut in South Indian film industry. Her first movie was Bezawada Police Station . In 2003, she starred in the telugu film Vishnu opposite Vishnu Manchu, produced by Mohan Babu. In 2006, she made her Bollywood debut with Ravi Shankar's film Iqraar by Chance, as Rashmi Mehra.

Shivanand is also a television actress. She began her television career with the 2007 medical youth show Dill Mill Gayye, where she portrayed the role of Dr.Riddhima Gupta. It became no.1 show of Star One and she became an "instant success". In May 2008, she quit Dill Mill Gayye and her exit caused a sizeable drop in the ratings of the show. In 2019, during her Interview with "Spotboye", she revealed that she had quit in 2008 because she had a fight with the executive producer during shoot of "Zara Zara Touch Me Touch Me" dance sequence. In April 2009, when Sukirti Kandpal had quit, the producer Siddharth Malhotra approached Shivanand for returning to Dill Mill Gayye but she asked for high amount of money which caused a conflict between her and the producer. In June 2010, she finally returned on fans' demands and portrayed a different character, Dr. Shilpa Malhotra. But her track was abruptly cut short. In October 2010, Shivanand made an early exit from the show as per script, also because of internal differences among actors and low TRP.

In 2012, she was featured in BBC Production's telefilm Teri Meri Love Stories, where she portrayed the role of Meera. In 2015, she did a cameo role in channel BIG magic's show Mahisagar.

== Filmography ==
=== Films ===
Key
†	Denotes films that have not yet been released

Year	Film	Role	Language	Ref(s)
2002	Bezawada Police Station	Shilpa	Telugu	
2003	Vishnu	Vaishnavi / Vedika	Telugu	
2004	Sarvabhouma	Anju	Kannada	
2006	Iqraar by Chance	Rashmi Mehra	Hindi	
2013	Bloody Isshq	Raadhika	Hindi	
2016	Yeh Hai Lollipop	Namita	Hindi	

=== Television ===
Year	Show	Role	Notes	Ref(s)
2007-2008	Dill Mill Gayye	Dr. Riddhima Gupta		
2010	Dill Mill Gayye	Dr. Shilpa Malhotra		
2012	Teri Meri Love Stories	Meera	Episode 2: A Love Triangle	
2015	Mahisagar	Herself (Celebrity Guest)	Episode 328	

=== Music videos ===
Year	Song	Album	Singer	Language
2002	Gol Gol Akh	Haaye Sohniye	Hans Raj Hans	Punjabi
2006	Kuch Der Tak	Tanhai: Lonely Hearts	Hariharan	Hindi
2014	Kachichiyan	Kachichiyan	Savvy Sandhu	Punjabi
2014	Khwaishein	Khwaishein: An Endless Dream	Shael Oswal and Ankita Mishra	Hindi
2016	Over Under	Illuminati	Tarsem Jassar	Punjabi

=== Television advertisements ===
- Appeared in Tv commercial "Nerolac Paints" along with prominent Bollywood celebrity Amitabh Bachchan

== Accolades ==
Year	Award	Category	Work	Result	Ref(s)
2008	The Global Indian Film & TV Honours	Best Onscreen Couple (with Karan Singh Grover )	Dill Mill Gayye	Nominated	
2008	Indian Television Academy Awards	Best Onscreen Couple (with Karan Singh Grover )	Dill Mill Gayye	Won	
