= Fox (film) =

2009 Indian film by Deepak Tijori

- Theatrical release poster
- Directed by: Deepak Tijori
- Screenplay by: Deepak Tijori
- Dialogues by: Kamal Pandey
- Story by: Deepak Tijori
- Produced by: Zee Motion Pictures; Tijori Entertainment; Rohit Kumar Productions
- Starring: Sunny Deol; Arjun Rampal; Sagarika Ghatge; Udita Goswami
- Cinematography: Nigam Bomzan
- Edited by: Manish More
- Music by: Monty Sharma
- Production company: Tijori Entertainment
- Distributed by: Zee Motion Pictures
- Release date: 4 September 2009
- Running time: 125 minutes
- Country: India
- Language: Hindi

Fox is a 2009 Indian Hindi-language thriller film written and directed by Deepak Tijori, starring Sunny Deol, Arjun Rampal, Sagarika Ghatge and Udita Goswami.

It is an action thriller movie about a cat-and-mouse chase between a young, successful criminal lawyer and a mysterious stranger (Fox) who is controlling and threatening his life. The film was released on 4 September 2009 and is inspired by the film A Murder of Crows (1999). The film was a disaster at the box office.

== Plot ==
Arjun Kapoor is a successful criminal defence lawyer. The film opens with him defending his friend Raj Thakur, who has been accused of rape and murder. Arjun's defence strategy involves suggesting the victim had dubious morals. The victim's parents confront Arjun outside the courthouse, cursing him for his lack of conscience. Later, Raj confesses to Arjun that he is guilty; when Arjun is disturbed by his friend's lack of shame, Raj points out that Arjun's success comes from defending wealthy criminals like him.

At home, Arjun calls his girlfriend and fellow lawyer Urvashi. A shadowy figure carrying a gun sneaks up on Arjun, but they retreat when they hear Arjun confess over the phone that he wants to change. When the court convenes the next morning, Arjun publicly accuses his friend of being guilty. The judge orders Arjun to step down from his duties, and his license is revoked. Arjun decides to take a break, leaving Mumbai and his girlfriend.

Arjun travels to Goa, where he meets an old man named Vivian McNamara who claims to be a retired lawyer. They spend time together, during which McNamara says he understands Arjun's situation. McNamara has written a novel titled "Fix the Fox," a crime thriller about the murder of five lawyers, which he hopes to publish and leave behind a positive legacy instead of a negative one. McNamara gives Arjun a copy of the manuscript, which he finishes reading in one night. When Arjun returns to McNamara's house the next morning, he is stopped by a police officer named Gaitonde, who tells him that McNamara just died.

As there's no one to give the manuscript to, Arjun decides to have it published in memoriam. He offers it to Sophia, a publishing house editor who recognizes its potential. The manuscript's pages are watermarked with "McNamara," which Sophie assumes is Arjun's pen name. Sophia's publishing policy is to use real names; she also doesn't normally accept unknown authors, but Arjun's fame as a lawyer will ensure the novel's publication. Arjun is pressured into signing a contract, officially claiming to be the author.

The novel becomes a national bestseller and lands in the hands of a local crime branch police officer, Yashwant Deshmukh, who reads it and finds something suspicious. Yashwant meets Arjun to discuss the novel, and when Arjun confirms that he wrote it, Yashwant has Arjun arrested. The five murders in the novel match five unsolved murders on file, right down to confidential details. Urvashi comes to Arjun's aid, negotiating for bail and a remand under Yashwant's custody so they can investigate the case themselves.

Arjun and Urvashi tell Yashwant the full story and ask for his help, but they can't find any evidence that "Vivian McNamara" or "Gaitonde" ever existed. Arjun then remembers that the original manuscript had the "McNamara" watermark, which may help cast reasonable doubt. Urvashi and he sneak out of Yashwant's house to get it from the publishing house. They arrive just as "Gaitonde" has taken it; Arjun chases him, eventually following him back to Yashwant's house.

Arjun sneaks into Yashwant's rooms, where he discovers pictures of Yashwant with "Gaitonde." He also finds a secret room where there are costume materials and newspaper articles of the five criminal lawyers and Arjun himself. He realizes that Yashwant is the "Fox" and is behind the murders and the frame-up.

Arjun agrees to meet Yashwant at a secluded location. There, he demands to know why Yashwant framed him. Yashwant explains that his wife and son were murdered, but a criminal defence lawyer similar to Arjun got the killer acquitted. Yashwant has since then vowed to kill all lawyers like him. He had almost killed Arjun, as seen earlier in the film, but changed his mind when he heard Arjun confess his troubles to Urvashi. Yashwant decided to give Arjun a chance, setting up the con with "Vivian McNamara" (actually Yashwant's brother, who also pretended to be Gaitonde), but when Arjun took credit for the novel, Yashwant took it as evidence that he hadn't changed at all. Arjun reveals that he's actually wired, and the entire conversation was recorded. Police officers come out of their hiding place, and when Yashwant attacks and overpowers Arjun, he is shot and killed by the police.

== Cast ==
- Sunny Deol as ACP Yashwant Deshmukh / "Fox"
- Arjun Rampal as Advocate Arjun Kapoor
- Sagarika Ghatge as Urvashi Mathur
- Udita Goswami as Sophia Mukherjee
- Kurush Deboo as Zubeen Mangal
- Vipul Gupta as Raj Thakur
- Ravi Gossain as Constable Gaitonde / Shinde / Fake McNamara
- Rituparna Sengupta as Mrs. Ritika Deshmukh
- Vishwajeet Pradhan as Dr. Vivian McNamara
- Naseer Abdullah as Public Prosecutor

== Music and soundtrack ==
The film’s music was composed by Monty Sharma with the lyrics of the songs penned by Sandeep Nath.

#	Title	Singer(s)
1	"Yaadein"	KK
2	"Zindagi Mein Mil Rahi Hai"	Kunal Ganjawala, Shreya Ghoshal
3	"Jashn Jashn"	Akriti Kakkar
4	"Advocat De Satan"	Kunal Ganjawala
5	"Josh Josh"	Kunal Ganjawala, Sunidhi Chauhan

== Reception ==
Shubhra Gupta of The Indian Express gave the film one out of five, writing, "After a sizable gap, Sunny Deol is back, but is not likely to thank Fox, which gives him an entry just before half-time. Arjun wears his hair long, and drives a Merc. Sagarika is the good girl, Udita the bad one. And it's all empty."
