= Moulshree Sachdeva =

Indian actress

- Occupation(s): Actress, Model
- Years active: 2009

Moulshree is an Indian film and television actress and a model.

She was part of a show called naina balsawar (Zee TV). .

== TV shows ==
- 2009 - Dill Mill Gayye as Dr.Tamanna Patil.

== Video albums ==
- Babul supriyo (kuch aisa lagta hai)
- Aaloyni (bheege chandani)
- Aryans
- Music video with vinal director
- Album with harry & anand
