= Panchi Bora =

Indian actress and model

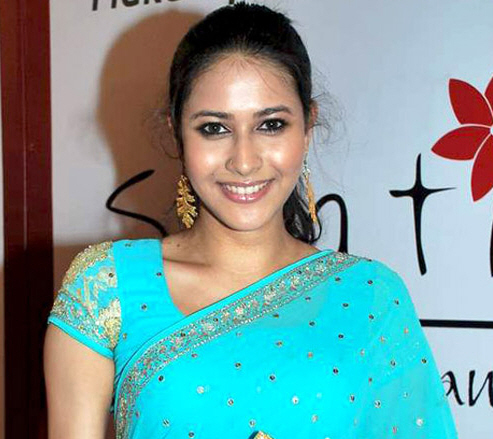
- Photo of Panchi Bora From The 3rd Boroplus Gold Awards
- Born: Guwahati, Assam, India
- Occupations: Actress, model
- Years active: 2004–2016; 2019

Panchi Bora is an Indian television actress and model from Assam. She played lead roles in the series Kayamath and Kitni Mast Hai Zindagi before working in the Telugu film industry.

== Life and career ==
Panchi Bora is a native of Assam. Her father is a retired army officer who relocated to Pune after his service. In her young adulthood, Bora enrolled at the ILS Law College in Pune. During her first year of college, she appeared in commercial and television advertisements. She worked alongside her mother in a Tata Indicom commercial and then appeared in a Cadbury advertisement.

Bora was discovered by Ekta Kapoor, the head of Balaji Telefilms. After seeing her in an advertisement, Kapoor offered her a role in the first-ever soap to be aired on MTV. Bora played the character of Ananya Puri, a radio jockey in the soap opera, called Kitni Mast Hai Zindagi. After the show, Bora decided to complete her college degree. She enrolled at Fergusson College, Pune, to pursue a Bachelor of Arts degree. Ekta Kapoor then approached her again for a role in Balaji Telefilms' series Kayamath. Bora said that initially, she was not interested in the role but that after Ekta Kapoor presented her with the script, she was interested and took it up. She played the central role of Prachi in Kayamath, who according to Bora was "a simple girl, very shy and attached to her family" and "unlike me in real life".

In 2009, Bora took a three-year break from acting before coming back in 2012. She came back with Bid Aai on STAR Plus. In 2010, while in Russia, she was selected to play the female lead in an English-language Russian TV production titled The Hindu – The Indian. She played Maya, an Indian girl, who she described as "extremely spiritual". The production was shot in parts of North India and Moscow. In 2013, she made an appearance in Gumrah: End of Innocence in which she played a fun-loving girl named Neelam, who aspires to be a designer.

She made her feature film debut in the 2011 Telugu film, Aakasame Haddu. The Hindu wrote, "Panchi Bora is gorgeous and slips easily into the role of a two-timer". Her second film was Uu Kodathara? Ulikki Padathara?, in which she was paired with Nandamuri Balakrishna. In the unreleased film Yamini Chandrasekhar, she played the titular character, Yamini, an archaeology student.

== Filmography ==
Year	Film	Role	Language	Notes
2011	Aakasame Haddu	Kirti	Telugu	
2012	Uu Kodathara? Ulikki Padathara?	Visalakshi	Telugu	
2012	Dhamarukam	Kavita	Telugu	
2014	Prabhanjanam	Pranita	Telugu	
2019	22 Yards	Shonali	Hindi	
2020	It's My Life	Kajal	Hindi	

== Television ==
Year	Show	Role	Notes
2004–2005	Kitni Mast Hai Zindagi	Ananya Puri	
2007	Kahiin To Hoga	Guest (as Prachi)	Special appearance
2007	Kahaani Ghar Ghar Kii	Guest (as Prachi)	Special appearance
2007	Kasautii Zindagii Kay	Guest (as Prachi)	Special appearance
2007–2009	Kayamath	Prachi Milind Mishra	
2008	Kumkum – Ek Pyara Sa Bandhan	Guest (as Prachi)	Special appearance
2008	Karam Apnaa Apnaa	Guest (as Prachi)	Special appearance
2008	Kasturi	Guest (as Prachi)	Special appearance
2008	CID	Neelima	
2008	Kaun Jeetega Bollywood Ka Ticket	Contestant	
2009	Bigg Boss 3	Guest	Spent 3 days
2010	The Hindu	Maya	Russian series Nominated, Best Actress of Drama Series at Monte-Carlo Television Festival
2010	Keshav Pandit	Sonu Juneja	
2012	Gumrah: End of Innocence	Neelam	Episodic appearance
2015–2016	Gangaa	Jhanvi Sagar Chaturvedi	

== See also ==
- List of Indian television actresses
