= Aparnaa Singh =

Indian filmmaker

- Born: Jabalpur, Madhya Pradesh
- Education: National School Of Drama
- Occupations: Director; Screenwriter

Aparna Singh is a Bollywood film writer and director.

== Early life ==
She was born in Jabalpur, Madhya Pradesh. She is an alumnus of National School Of Drama. She assisted Anurag Kashyap at Black Friday .

== Career ==
She debuted in Bollywood as director of the film Irada, starring Naseeruddin Shah, Divya Dutta, Sharad Kelkar, and Arshad Warsi. This films concept based on reverse boring and its demerit with sociopolitical drama.
