= Kayamath =

- क़यामत
- Created by: Ekta Kapoor
- Screenplay by: Anil Nagpal; Bobby Bhonsle; Sampurn Anand; Sonali Jaffar; Dialogues; Dheeraj Sarna; Neha Kumari
- Directed by: Anil V. Kumar; Talat Jani; Rishi Sharma; Jafar Shaikh; Vivek kumar Vicky Chauhan; Amit Gupta; Anoop Chaudhary; V.G Roy; Kushal Zaveri; Ajay Veermal
- Creative directors: Nivedita Basu; Doris Dey; Ipshita Deb; Mansi Sawant; Sandiip Sikcand; Neeshi Oza
- Starring: Panchi Bora; Shabir Ahluwalia; Jay Bhanushali; Sanjeeda Sheikh; Anita Hassanandani; Reshmi Ghosh; For other listings See Below
- Opening theme: "Kayamath" by Babul Supriyo & Priya Bhattacharya
- Country of origin: India
- Original language: Hindi
- No. of episodes: 411

Production
- Producers: Ekta Kapoor; Shobha Kapoor
- Cinematography: Deepak Malwankar; Santosh Suryavanshi; Sanjay Memane
- Editors: Vikas Sharma; Sandeep Bhatt; Sanjeev Shukla; Joydeep Nath; Mukesh Singh
- Running time: 24 minutes
- Production company: Balaji Telefilms

Original release
- Network: STAR Plus
- Release: 19 February 2007 – 12 March 2009

Kayamath (transl. Doomsday) was an Indian soap opera that aired on Star Plus. The show started airing on 19 February 2007, replacing Kahiin to Hoga, and ended on 12 March 2009. The show emphasized how relationships change over time. It starred Shabbir Ahluwalia, Panchi Bora, Jay Bhanushali, and Sanjeeda Sheikh in lead roles.

== Plot ==
Brought up in the lap of luxury, Neev Shergill and Prachi Shah are oblivious to the harsh realities of life. Neev and Prachi's childhood friendship blossoms into love. On the other hand, friends turned lovers Milind Mishra and Ayesha Mehra have lived in poverty all their lives.

Prachi and Ayesha become close friends. Meanwhile, Prachi's brother Alaap starts a relationship with Milind's sister Sukriti. Things turn ugly between Prachi and Milind's families when Alaap humiliates Sukriti and dumps her after a one-night stand.

Prachi is about to marry a man named Varun but he turns out to be a fraud. Finally, as Neev and Prachi are about to be married, it is revealed that Prachi and Ayesha are half-sisters. Prachi's father Inder had an affair with Ayesha's mother Amrita but left her for his wife Premlata and their daughter Prachi. Amrita became mentally unstable but Inder could never accept Ayesha.

Ayesha begins to resent Prachi. She takes over the Shah family's business empire and blackmails Neev into marrying her. Shortly after they get married, Prachi discovers that Inder's death was not an accident but a murder.

Milind, who had moved to Turkey for work, re-enters as a millionaire. To teach Ayesha a lesson as well as to make Prachi pay for Alaap's misdeeds, he presents Prachi with a deal: he will help her find her father's murderer if she agrees to marry him. Prachi accepts. Milind and Prachi's marriage leaves Neev and Ayesha devastated. Milind uses Prachi to make Ayesha jealous, but when alone, mistreats her. Slowly, Milind starts respecting and caring for Prachi. Ayesha constantly attempts to create misunderstandings between them by implying that Prachi is cheating on him with Neev. Neev discovers Ayesha manipulated Prachi into breaking up with him and wants her back but she refuses. Milind and Prachi confess their feelings and consummate their marriage.

Prachi learns of Sukriti and Alaap's illegitimate son, Ritvik and brings the child home and pretends to be his mother. This infuriates Milind and he takes the matter to court. The two nearly get divorced, but the truth comes out just in time. A desperate Ayesha now decides to murder Prachi but Milind is hit by the car and he suffers partial amnesia forgetting Prachi is his wife. Ayesha forces Neev, who has ended his marriage with her, to marry Prachi so that Milind can be hers but before any wedding, Milind's memory returns and he and Prachi reunite. A dejected Ayesha finally gives up.

A businesswoman named Mallika falls for Milind. Ayesha warns her to stay away from Milind and Prachi. One night Mallika brings Milind to her uncle's farmhouse and spikes his drink, making him pass out. Ayesha shows up and in the ensuing scuffle, Mallika stabs and kills Ayesha. Prachi learns that she is pregnant but, before she can tell Milind, she finds out that Ayesha has been murdered and Milind is arrested for it.

Mallika forces Prachi to leave Milind to help free him. Prachi agrees and leaves Milind to catch a train. In the meanwhile, Milind is released. He figures out that Mallika is responsible for Prachi's sudden decision to leave him. He tries to stop Prachi but in vain. Prachi reaches Kolkata and meets a Bengali couple - Proteek Dasgupta and his wife Panchi, who are travelling with their infant. Panchi hears out Prachi's story and urges Proteek to convince her to stay with them. Milind drives off to the station where Prachi's train is supposed to arrive. Upon reaching there, he and the Shahs come to know that there has been a blast on the train and assume Prachi is dead.

=== 5 years later ===
It is revealed that Panchi had died in the bomb blast. Proteek honoured her last wish by inviting Prachi to stay with him and his family. When they arrived at the Dasgupta household, Prachi is assumed to be Panchi by Proteek's family. Proteek requests Prachi to pretend to be Panchi for the sake of his ailing father. Proteek and Prachi have been raising two children - Suprateek (Proteek and Panchi's son) and Sumonto (Milind and Prachi's son). Proteek has fallen in love with Prachi and hopes that she'll reciprocate his feelings someday.

On Sumonto's birthday, Prachi gives him a gold chain she had made for Milind. Sumonto meets with an accident and receives blood from an anonymous donor at the hospital. The donor leaves behind his locket and Prachi realises it is Milind but does not approach him recalling Mallika's threat. She meets the social worker, Sushmita Mukherjee, accompanying Milind who tells her that she runs a rehab centre for the lonely. Milind is shown unkempt and shattered with a picture of Prachi.

Proteek meets with an accident and is saved by Milind who is invited to stay with the Dasguptas. Prachi sees Milind but hides from him conflicted between her love for Milind and her responsibility to the Dasguptas. Milind begins to bond with Sumonto. After he comes face to face with Prachi, she explains why she's living with the Dasguptas and that Sumonto is his son. She urges him to keep their relationship a secret, but he vows to get his wife and son back. On the day Prachi and Proteek are to marry, the latter stops the wedding and says that he knows the truth about Milind. Milind and Prachi reunite and return to the Shah house with Sumonto.

Alaap, though married to Sukriti, is having an affair with a woman called Kamya. Meanwhile, it appears that Ayesha has come back as Gayatri, Sumonto's school teacher. Alaap creates some problem because of which Milind is expected to give ₹ 120 crores to some creditors in six months. He is forced to mortgage his house to their boss who is revealed to be Kamya.

Gayatri helps Prachi get a job. On Prachi and Milind's wedding anniversary, the whole family gives them a surprise party. Prachi wants to introduce Gayatri to Milind but finds her gone. Then Gayatri reveals that she is Ayesha's spirit, whom no one but Prachi can see. The spirit tells Prachi that she will get into her body and live as Milind's wife. The spirit makes Prachi befriend Kamya. Meanwhile, Alaap begins to change for the better. Sukriti decides to kill herself because of everything that has happened, but is saved by her friend Raghav. Alaap feels jealous.

An elderly female relative, called Bua visits the family and becomes suspicious of Prachi's behaviour. She discovers that Prachi is being controlled by black magic being done by Neev's father, Pranay. Pranay had also killed Prachi's father Inder. He is arrested as Prachi and Milind unite and live happily.

== Cast ==
- Shabbir Ahluwalia as Milind Mishra
- Panchi Bora as Prachi Shah
- Jay Bhanushali as Neev Shergill
- Sanjeeda Sheikh as Ayesha Mehra / Gayatri
- Azaan Shah as Sumonto Mishra, Milind and Prachi's son
- Mohnish Behl / Ronit Roy as Inder Shah, Prachi and Ayesha's father
- Prachi Shah as Premlata Inder Shah, Inder's wife and Prachi's mother
- Churni Ganguly as Amrita Mehra, Inder's former lover and Ayesha's mother
- Neena Kulkarni as Mrs. Shah / Dadi, Inder's mother
- Bharat Arora as Alaap Shah, Inder and Premlata's son, Prachi's brother
- Anu Sinha as Saumya Shah, Inder and Premlata's second daughter, Prachi's sister
- Gaurav Gupta as Bobby Shah, Inder and Premlata's second son, Prachi's brother
- Sooraj Thapar as Pranay Shergill, Neev's father and Inder's business partner
- Sajni Srivastav as Niharika Shergill, Neev's mother
- Vimmi Bhatt as Purvi Shergill, Neev's sister
- Ayushmann Khurrana / Alok Narula as Saket Shergill, Neev's brother
- S M Zaheer as Baba Mishraji, Milind's father
- Vinisha Dugar as Sukriti Mishra, Milind's sister and Alaap's wife
- Gaurav Chaudhary as Proteek Dasgupta, Prachi's fake husband who shelters her and Sumonto
- Ashok Lokhande as Ashok Mehta, Premlata's brother
- Prinal Oberoi as Nayantara Mehta, Ashok's daughter
- Reshmi Ghosh as Mallika, a businesswoman who falls for Milind and kills Ayesha
- Madhura Naik as Kamya, a businesswoman who has an affair with Alaap
- Eijaz Khan as Varun Bhatia, Prachi's former fiancé who turns out to be a fraud
- Anita Hassanandani as Swati Varun Bhatia / Preeti, Varun's wife

== Special appearances ==
- Smriti Irani as Tulsi (from Kyunki Saas Bhi Kabhi Bahu Thi)
- Sakshi Tanwar as Parvati (from Kahaani Ghar Ghar Kii)
- Hina Khan as Akshara (to promote Yeh Rishta Kya Kehlata Hai)
- Sara Khan as Sadhna (from Sapna Babul Ka...Bidaai)
- Parul Chauhan as Ragini (from Sapna Babul Ka...Bidaai)
- Additi Gupta as Heer (from Kis Desh Mein Hai Meraa Dil)
- Harshad Chopda as Prem Juneja (from Kis Desh Mein Hai Meraa Dil)
- Puja Banerjee as Vrinda (from Tujh Sang Preet Lagai Sajna)

== Crossover ==
- With Kyunki Saas Bhi Kabhi Bahu Thi and Kahaani Ghar Ghar Ki on 21 March 2007.
