= Miley Naa Miley Hum =

2011 Indian film by Tanveer Khan

- Directed by: Tanveer Khan
- Screenplay by: Girish Dhamija, Tanveer Khan
- Produced by: Maverick Productions Pvt Ltd
- Starring: Kangana Ranaut; Sagarika Ghatge; Chirag Paswan; Tanya Abrol
- Cinematography: Baba Azmi
- Edited by: Rameshwar S Bhagat
- Music by: Sajid–Wajid
- Production companies: Kamalistan and Filmcity
- Distributed by: Cinemax; UFO Moviez
- Release date: 4 November 2011
- Running time: 115 minutes
- Country: India
- Language: Hindi

Miley Naa Miley Hum (transl. Whether we meet or don't) is a 2011 Indian film directed by Tanveer Khan, and marking the debut of Chirag Paswan, son of the late politician Ram Vilas Paswan. The film stars Kangana Ranaut and Sagarika Ghatge. The film was released on 4 November 2011.

The film went unnoticed and was a box office disaster.

== Plot ==
Chirag comes from a wealthy background and assists his father, Siddharth Mehra, in managing and maintaining their land. Chirag's parents have been divorced due to incompatibility arising mainly due to his businesswoman mother, Shalini's hatred of tennis, a sport that Chirag wants to play professionally.

Shalini and Siddharth would like to see Chirag married, and accordingly, Shalini picks London-based Kamiah, while Siddharth picks Bathinda-based Manjeet Ahluwalia. Chirag, who sneaks off to practice tennis at night, is asked to make a choice but informs them that he is in love with a model named Anishka. The displeased couple decides to confront and put pressure on a struggling and unknowing klutz-like Anishka to leave their son alone, but they fail.

In the end, Chirag's parents realize their mistake and together attend Chirag's tennis match and give blessings to Chirag and Anishka.

== Cast ==
- Chirag Paswan as Chirag Mehra
- Kangana Ranaut as Anishka Srivastava
- Kabir Bedi as Siddharth Mehra
- Poonam Dhillon as Shalini Mehra
- Sagarika Ghatge as Kamiah
- Neeru Bajwa as Manjeet Ahulwalia
- Dalip Tahil
- Suresh Menon
- Tanya Abrol
- Kunal Kumar
- Shweta Tiwari (Special appearance in a song)

== Critical reception ==
Taran Adarsh of Bollywood Hungama gave the film 2.5 stars and claimed that "Miley Naa Miley Hum is an absorbing fare with decent merits." Ankur Pathak of Rediff.com gave the film 1.5 out of 5 writing, "Miley Na Miley Hum is a film where nothing works, and nobody benefits (that is, if you don't count random product-placements). If you find lines like "Sushi is kacchi macchi" funny, or want to watch the noble game of tennis being massacred, this one's for you. And if you're turned on by unsympathetic characters creating conflict for no reason at all, watching Bigg Boss might be cheaper."

== Soundtrack ==
Miley Naa Miley Hum

Soundtrack album to Miley Naa Miley Hum by Sajid–Wajid
- Released: 2011
- Recorded: 2011
- Genre: Feature film soundtrack
- Languages: Hindi and Punjabi
- Label: T-Series
- Producer: Sajid–Wajid

Sajid–Wajid chronology
Yeh Dooriyan (2011)	Miley Naa Miley Hum (2011)	Housefull 2 (2012)

Track listing
No.	Title	Singer(s)	Length
1.	"Nazar Se Nazar Mille"	Wajid, Abhilasha Chellam, Anupama Raag	5:12
2.	"Nazar Se Nazar Milie(Rahat)"	Rahat Fateh Ali Khan	5:00
3.	"Mahi Mahi"	Richa Sharma and Wajid	3:36
4.	"Katto Gilehri"	Daler Mehndi, Mamta Sharma	4:26
5.	"Haan Yahi Pyaar Hai"	Shaan, Shreya Ghoshal	4:40
6.	"Wake Up Now"	Wajid, Suzanne D'Mello	4:40
