= Irada (2017 film) =

2017 Indian film directed by Aparnaa Singh

- Directed by: Aparnaa Singh
- Written by: Aparnaa Singh; Anushka Rajan
- Produced by: Falguni Patel; Prince Soni
- Starring: Naseeruddin Shah; Arshad Warsi; Divya Dutta; Sharad Kelkar; Sagarika Ghatge
- Cinematography: Ravi Walia
- Edited by: Yashashwini Yp
- Music by: Songs: Neeraj Sridhar; Background Score: Raju Singh
- Release date: 17 February 2017
- Running time: 110 min
- Country: India
- Language: Hindi
- Budget: ₹75 million
- Box office: ₹11 million

Irada (transl. Intention) is a 2017 Indian thriller film directed by Aparnaa Singh and produced by Falguni Patel and Prince Soni. The film is written by Aparnaa Singh and Anushka Rajan, and stars Naseeruddin Shah, Arshad Warsi, Divya Dutta, Sharad Kelkar, and Sagarika Ghatge in lead roles.

The film raises the contemporary ecological issues of uranium poisoning, reverse boring, and fertilizer poisoning due to the green revolution and their immediate adverse impact on the people who live in Malwa region.

== Plot ==
The film is set in Bathinda, with its thermal power plants and factories in the background. It is based on a true story.

The daughter of an ex-army man discovers that she has a serious life-threatening illness. Gradually they piece together the reason for this and discover that it is due to the carcinogenic elements that have entered the ground water. Everyone in the city is affected by it.

A journalist meanwhile has discovered files that will incriminate the people responsible for this ground water poisoning, but he is kidnapped. His girlfriend, who is also a journalist, pursues the case, trying to convince the authorities to arrest the people responsible.

Meanwhile, a mysterious bomb blast in a business tycoon's factory prompts the state CM to hire an NIA officer. He meets the ex-army man seeking revenge for his dead daughter and the journalist demanding justice for her slain boyfriend. He tries to balance his knowledge of the truth, his wish for a more stable posting (having just come from a Naxal region), a better family life and his conscience.

== Cast ==
- Naseeruddin Shah as Lt Col Parabjeet Walia (Retd)
- Arshad Warsi as NIA Officer Arjun Mishra
- Sharad Kelkar as Paddy F Sharma
- Sagarika Ghatge as Maya Singh
- Divya Dutta as Ramandeep Braitch, CM- Paddy's mistress
- Diwakar Kumar as Jagat Sinha
- Nikhil Pandey as Maya’s boyfriend
- Rajesh Sharma as Jeetu Arora- Paddy's Manager
- Prashant Gupta as Bhagat Singh
- Savita Bhatti as Harmeet Braitch
- Rumana Molla as Riya Walia
- Prince Soni as Sunday Singh
- Rohan Shah as Ricky Bhullar
- Radhika Bangia as Ruby Gill
- Rajeev Mehta as Abdul Hasan
- Mehtaab as Nanu Hasan
- Lubhani Attwal as Dolly Chadha
- Seerat Kaur as Mitali Sharma

== Soundtrack ==
Irada

Soundtrack album by Neeraj Sridhar
- Released: 1 February 2017
- Genre: Feature film soundtrack
- Length: 21:47
- Label: Times Music
External audio
- Audio Jukebox on YouTube

The soundtrack of the film consists of 4 songs all of which have been composed by Neeraj Sridhar, while the lyrics have been penned by Sameer Anjaan. The first song titled "Mahi" from the movie was released on 3 February 2017, along with the music video. The full movie jukebox was unveiled on 17 February 2017 and it consists of 4 songs in total, including the movie theme song. The music rights are bought by Times Music.

The film also uses Hindi poetry and Urdu Shayari to convey its message at critical junctures. Parts of the Hindi poet Dushyant Kumar's poem ""Ho Gayi hai Peer Parvat Si"(हो गई है पीर पर्वत-सी)" have been used by Naseeruddin Shah's character, especially during a book launch, to convey that people need to speak out and rise when they see injustice. Similar, contemporary Urdu shayari by Nawaz Deo bandhi has been used at critical junctures.

Tracklist
No.	Title	Singer(s)	Length
1.	"Mahi"	Harshdeep Kaur & Shabab Sabri	05:08
2.	"Irada"	Nikhil Uzgare	05:31
3.	"Chaand Rajai Odhe"	Papon	06:42
4.	"Mitran De"	Master Saleem, Kaur B & Earl Edgar	04:26
Total length:			21:47

== Critical reception ==
On review aggregator website Rotten Tomatoes, Irada has an approval score of 57% on the basis of 7 reviews with an average rating of 4.6 out of 10. Rohit Vats of Hindustan Times rated the film 3 out of 5 stars and said, "Constructed on the lines of A Wednesday!, Irada tries to look like a thriller but fails to sustain the initial momentum as many sub-stories cross paths." Saibal Chattarjee of NDTV rated the film 3 out of 5 and said, "Irada is a gripping enough tale somewhat undermined by its two facile villains – one represents the manipulative big corporations, the other the pliant political class." Nandini Ramnath of Scroll.in praised the performances of the actors and said that, "‘Irada’ is a well-intended expose of pollution and graft. A superb cast and some smart writing paper over the flaws in Aparnaa Singh’s debut movie." Mohar Basu of Mid-Day gave the film a rating of 2 out of 5 saying that, "Irada' has an overcrowded plot with facile characters, and lacks both the required energy and depth of the subject. There are too many parallel narratives and Aparnaa Singh's limited directorial skills aren't enough to handle the snags" Udita Jhunjhunwala of LiveMint praised the concept of the film and the performances of actors Naseeruddin Shah and Arshad Warsi but criticized the execution of the film saying that, "While there’s no faulting Irada’s intentions, the narrative is poorly crafted and clumsily executed." Namrata Joshi of The Hindu said that, "Irada has its heart in the right place—dealing with the theme of ecological and human hazards that points to big corporations and their irresponsible disposed of chemical wastes. But alas, it fails to fashion a compelling film out of it."

Meena Iyer of The Times of India praised the concept of the film saying that, "Irada has its heart in the right place. Having picked up a subject that talks of environmental hazards, debutant director Aparnaa Singh’s conscientious streak shows" but criticized its writing saying that, "the film’s failing is it’s [sic] amateur writing and execution. You can see that the maker is crushed under the weight of the material chosen". The critic gave the film a rating of 2.5 out of 5. Box Office India said, "Aparnaa Singh's direction makes Irada a gripping and an intriguing film, which opens your eyes to some harsh realities in the world." Shubha Shetty Saha from Catch News rated the film 3.5 out of 5 stars and said, "Arshad Warsi and Naseeruddin Shah surprise us with this socially relevant thriller!" Stutee Ghosh of The Quint gave the film a rating of 2.5 out of 5 saying that, "‘Irada’ is well intentioned. Unfortunately, however, it suffers from amateurish execution. It has some nice touches but it never truly comes together. Still, it deals with an important issue that should reach more people and it definitely merits attention." Rachit Gupta of Filmfare gave the film a rating of 1.5 out of 5 and said that, "The clichéd story telling, the jaded treatment, this film massacres its objective – that of highlighting the rampant pollution of habitats in Punjab. The only silver lining to this film is watching the great cast trying to lend respectability to a movie that least deserves it."

== Awards and nominations ==
Award	Category	Recipient(s)	Result	Ref.
65th National Film Awards	Best Film on Environment Conservation/Preservation	Irada Entertainment and Aparnaa Singh	Won	
65th National Film Awards	Best Supporting Actress	Divya Dutta	Won	
