= Dill Mill Gayye =

Indian youth medical drama (2007-2010)

- Genre: Medical drama Romantic comedy
- Created by: Palki Malhotra; Siddharth P. Malhotra
- Screenplay by: Barry Dhillon; Priya Ramanathan; Kapil Pandey
- Story by: Priya Ramanthan; Arif Ali; Vincent Franklin
- Directed by: Nissar Parvez; Amit Mallik; Aniruddha Rajderekar; Arshad Khan; Vikram V Labhe; Rahul Agarwal
- Creative directors: Rohini Singh; Ameeta Devadiga; Anupama Shenoy; Amitabh Raina; Charou Singhal; Palki Malhotra
- Starring: Karan Singh Grover; Shilpa Anand; Sukirti Kandpal; Jennifer Winget; Karan Wahi; See below
- Theme music composer: Raju Singh
- Opening theme: "Dill Mill Gayye" by Sonu Nigam and Prajakta Shukre
- Composer: Raju Singh
- Country of origin: India
- Original language: Hindi
- No. of seasons: 2
- No. of episodes: 722

Production
- Executive producers: Narendra Suresh K Irfan Jamiawala
- Producers: Prem Krishen; Sunil Mehta
- Cinematography: Prakash Barot
- Editors: Afzal Sheikh; Ajeet Singh; Sukhwinder S. Bharaj; Vinay Malu; Ganga Kacharla; Sagar Nighojkar
- Camera setup: Multi-camera
- Running time: 25 minutes
- Production company: Cinevistaas Limited

Original release
- Network: STAR One
- Release: 20 August 2007 – 29 October 2010

Related
- Sanjivani

Dill Mill Gayye (transl. Hearts Have Met) is an Indian medical drama television series that aired on Star One from 20 August 2007 to 29 October 2010. It was a sequel to the Star Plus series Sanjivani: A Medical Boon. The series is available digitally on Disney+ Hotstar.

The show focuses on a new generation of medical interns with the crux being the love story between Dr. Armaan Malik, portrayed by Karan Singh Grover and Dr. Riddhima Gupta which was originally portrayed by Shilpa Anand, who was later replaced by Sukirti Kandpal and then Jennifer Winget.

== Plot ==
=== Season 1 ===
The show follows the lives of surgical interns and resident doctors of Sanjeevani hospital. It deals with the pressures, drama, romance, interpersonal relationships and humour in their lives. At the start of the show, the interns are Dr Anjali Gupta, Dr Armaan Malik, Dr Riddhima Gupta, Dr Atul Joshi, and Dr Sapna Shah. Dr Shashank Gupta is the head of the hospital and the father of Anjali and Riddhima.

Initially, Armaan and Riddhima were at loggerheads. Anjali and Armaan become good friends, and Riddhima, Atul and Sapna become a good friend. A medical camp is arranged in a village where Armaan and Riddhima come closer towards each other, and Armaan begans to fall in love with Riddhima. Slowly, they become friends. Riddhima learns that she is Nurse Padma's daughter and not Dr Shashank's real daughter. Anjali makes a bet with Armaan that Riddhima will fall for him. Riddhima learns about this. She is heartbroken. After few instances, they resolve their differences, and Riddhima finally confesses her love to Armaan. They are enjoying their togetherness.

Two new interns enter Dr Rahul Garewal and Dr Muskaan Chadda. Rahul and Armaan have a tashan between them. Muskaan likes Armaan and Rahul likes Riddhima. Meanwhile, Atul started liking Anjali and Sapna marries a patient. Rahul and Muskaan's family wants them to get married, but they don't want to. To get away from this situation, Muskaan receives help from Armaan without telling Riddhima about this. This leads to a separation between Armaan and Riddhima. Rahul now knows about them.

Nurse Padma and Dr Shashank wed. Dr Shubhanker likes Dr Keerti. Riddhima and Armaan become friends again, and eventually, they confess again, marking their togetherness. On the other side, Muskaan and Rahul develop feelings for each other. Dr Nikita Malhotra joins Sanjeevani. Nikita turns out to be Armaan's and Rahul's college friend secretly in love with Armaan. Dr Abhimanyu Modi enters Sanjeevani to save it from a financial crisis. He makes some decisions that the interns did not accept. They do non-cooperation movement and arrange a special show to collect funding. Dr Abhimanyu develops feelings for Dr Riddhima first. All the friends doubt that Armaan and Riddhima are together. So, they ask Nikita's help. But Nikita helps Armaan instead in keeping the secret, and they all think Armaan and Nikita have a scene instead of Riddhima. Armaan thinks of impressing Dr Shashank, disguising himself and changing his looks into a soft, straightforward person. Riddhima is pissed off because of this. Armaan arranges a particular date for her. Unfortunately, the police catch them, and everyone learns about them. No one allows them to meet each other. Armaan takes help from all their friends to persuade Dr Shashank and Anjali against their relationship. He starts living outside their house in a tent. The media started to publicise this matter. Finally, on Valentine's Day, Dr Shashank gives in due to Ridhhima's deteriorating health and accepts them, "Dr Love" gets his love, and Armaan Riddhima comes together. Their Roka is planned.

Armaan's family comes. Billy is very frank, which Dr Shashank doesn't like. Billy and Annie were separated, and Dr Shashank wants to dig out this matter. Armaan Riddhima started to have differences on this. Dr Keerti and Shubhanker wed. Bubbly, sister of Dr Shubhanker, is frank with Armaan, which Riddhima does not like. Due to Dr Abhimanyu and Bubbly, Armaan Riddhima have constant fights. One day, Armaan had an accident, and he lost his recent memory, including Riddhima. Riddhima is heartbroken. Armaan makes fun of her unknowingly that she is her life, Riddhima. Armaan has to rewrite the medical exam. She helps him. Both come closer. Friends try to tell Armaan how much he loved her. They both are together again. They are about to get engaged. On the day of engagement, a pregnant couple tries to hide in the hospital. Prominent politicians were involved in the case. Armaan and Riddhima are also stuck in the situation. In the last scene of the first season, Riddhima is shot, and she falls over Armaan, who hits a glass table. Atul is also shot. Dr Abhimanyu estranged wife, Jiah, returns.

=== Season 2 ===
The show introduces five new interns: Dr Siddhant Modi, Dr Yuvraj Oberoi, Dr Naina Mehta, Dr Tamanna Patil, and Dr Jitendra Prasad. Dr Siddhant Modi falls in love with Tamanna, but the latter chooses to marry the person of her father's choice for his self-respect. Dr Shashank gets injured, and Riddhima comes back to Sanjivani. It is revealed that Armaan left her because of her spine injury due to the bullet because doctors thought she'll never be able to walk again. Eventually, she and Sid get into arguments and begin to hate each other. Riddhima learns that Armaan left her because of nerve damage that happened because he hit the glass table during the shootout. She feels guilty and goes in search of him, with Sid following, trying to protect her. Due to misunderstandings regarding Sid and Riddhima's relationship, Dr Shashank all but presses her to marry him for her benefit. She tries to commit suicide on the wedding day but is saved by Sid. Sid and Riddhima decide to give their marriage a chance. Then they eventually shared some romantic moments until the return of Dr Armaan, who is heartbroken to learn about their marriage. Still, he tries to mend things between Sid and Riddhima and succeeds in doing so, no matter how much it hurts him. Dr Shilpa enters and falls in love with Dr Armaan. Dr Armaan cannot cope with the fact that he has lost his love and becomes gloomy. Dr Shilpa decides to sacrifice her love knowing that Dr Riddhima is her stepsister and Armaan still loves her deeply. Now Riddhima is in a dilemma between Armaan and Siddhant. Siddhant divorces Riddhima after realising that she can never love him. Riddhima eventually chooses Armaan, and the show ends with Riddhima singing a song for Armaan.

== Cast and characters ==
=== Main ===
- Karan Singh Grover as Dr. Armaan Malik – Intern and later senior resident doctor at Sanjeevani, Riddhima's love interest. (2007-2010)
- Shilpa Anand as Dr. Riddhima Gupta – Intern at Sanjeevani, daughter of Dr. Shashank and Padma Gupta, younger sister of Dr. Anjali and Armaan's love interest. (2007-2008)
  - Sukirti Kandpal as Dr. Riddhima Gupta – Intern, Armaan's love interest. (2008-2009)
  - Jennifer Winget as Dr. Riddhima Gupta/Dr. Riddhima Modi– Senior resident doctor at Sanjeevani and Siddhant's ex-wife, Armaan's love interest. (2009-2010)
  - Anand also portrays Dr. Shilpa Malhotra, intern at Sanjeevani, and Riddhima's half-sister (Kartik's daughter), who is Armaan's love interest. (2010)
- Karan Wahi as Dr. Siddhant Modi – Abhimanyu's younger brother. Tamanna's love interest and Riddhima's ex-husband. (2009-2010)

=== Recurring ===
- Mohnish Bahl as Dr. Shashank Gupta – Head of Sanjeevani hospital. Father of Anjali and Riddhima. Widower of Smriti; later marries Nurse Padma. (2007-2010)
- Pankit Thakker as Dr. Atul Joshi – Dr. Omi's (Sanjeevani Season 1) adoptive son. Eco-friendly and lives with plants. Armaan's best friend and Anjali's love interest. (2007-2010)
- Sunaina Gulia as Dr. Anjali Gupta – Riddhima's elder sister. Atul's love interest. (2007-2010) Anjali later appeared in Sanjivani, portrayed by Sayantani Ghosh.
- Sonia Singh as Dr. Kirti Mehra Rai – Sanjeevani's senior resident doctor. Sukirti's twin sister. Shubhankar's love interest. Later, Shubhankar's wife. (2007-2010)
  - Sonia Singh as Sukirti Mehra- Kirti's twin sister.
- Ayaz Khan as Dr. Shubhankar Rai – Sanjeevani's senior resident doctor. Kirti's love interest & later, Kirti's husband, Navneeta's father. (2007-2010)
- Mayank Anand as Dr. Rahul Garewal – Intern, Friends with Armaan and Muskaan's love interest. (2007-2009)
- Drashti Dhami as Dr Muskaan Chadda – Intern, Rahul's love interest. (2007-2009)
- Amit Tandon as Dr. Abhimanyu Modi –Senior doctor in Sanjeevani. Nikita's love interest. (2008-2010)
- Shweta Gulati as Dr. Nikita Malhotra – Loved Armaan since college days, but falls in love with Abhimanyu in Sanjeevani. (2008-2010)
- Muskaan Mihani as Dr. Sapna Shah – Intern in Sanjeevani. Marries a patient Amit. (2007-2008)
- Moulshree Sachdeva as Dr. Tamanna Patil – Siddhant's love interest, but becomes engaged to Aniket. (2009)
- Neha Jhulka as Dr. Naina Mehta – Intern, Yuvraj's love interest. (2009-2010)
- Sehban Azim as Dr. Yuvraj Oberoi – Intern, Naina's love interest. (2009-2010)
- Prasad Barve as Dr. Jitendra Prasad – Also known as JP. Intern in Sanjeevani. Close friends with Jiggy. (2009-2010)
- Shilpa Tulaskar as Padma Bansal Gupta – Head nurse in Sanjeevani, Riddhima's real mother and Shashank's second wife. (2007-2008)
  - Ekta Sohini as Padma Bansal Gupta. (2009-2010)
- Preeti Amin as Dr. Jiah Modi – Abhimanyu's first wife. A patient with mental illness who tries to separate Nikki and Abhimanyu. (2009)
- Karan Paranjpe as Jignesh 'Jiggy – Naina's friend and later, male nurse in Sanjeevani. Also, close friends with JP. (2009-2010)
- Madhura Naik as Dr. Suvarna Modi – Siddhant and Abhimanyu's sister. Intern at Sanjeevani. (2010)
- Barun Sobti as Dr. Raj Singh – A drug addict patient involved in a love triangle with Naina and Yuvraj. Later, intern at Sanjeevani. (2010)
- Vinita Malik as Nani – Smriti's (Shashank's first wife in Sanjivani) mother. Riddhima and Anjali's grandmother. (2007-2009)
- Mahesh Jadhav as Nana – Patient who gives valuable life lessons to Armaan and tries to bring Riddhima and Armaan together. Harbours a crush on Dr. Kirti. (2007-2010)
- Swini Khara as Minnie – Patient in Sanjeevani. Armaan's mini 'girlfriend'. (2007/2009)
- Aasif Sheikh as Balvinder "Billy" Mallik – Armaan's father, Ananya's husband. (2009-2010)
- Meher Acharia Dar as Ananya "Annie" Mallik – Armaan's mother, Billy's wife. (2009)
- Hemali Karpe as Lovely – Nurse at Sanjeevani. (2007-2010)
- Iravati Harshe as Dr. Smriti Gupta – Anjali's mother, Riddhima's adopted mother and Dr. Shashank's late wife. (2007)
- Upasana Singh – Abhimanyu, Siddhant and Suvarna's mother. (2010)
- Shakti Arora as Sumit – Patient in Sanjeevani and loves Riddhima. (2007)
- Deepali Pansare as Sumalatha Dalmiya – Dr. Abhimanyu's assistant. (2009)
- Roopal Tyagi as Bubbly/Pari – Shubhankar's sister. (2009)
- Kanika Maheshwari as Maya – Armaan's stalker. (2007)
- Romanchak Arora as Aniket Joshi – Dr. Tamanna's fiance. (2009)
- Jannat Zubair Rahmani as Tamanna – Patient in Sanjeevani. (2010)
- Suhail More as Gappu – Patient in Sanjeevani. (2008-2009)
- Amey Pandya as Patient in Sanjeevani. (2008)

=== Guest appearances ===
- Mohit Malik (2008)

Crossover with Miley Jab Hum Tum

- Sanaya Irani – as Gunjan
- Arjun Bijlani – as Mayank
- Mohit Sehgal – as Samraat
- Rati Pandey – as Nupur
- Navina Bole – as Dia, Siddhant's friend
- Anupriya Kapoor – as Suhani
- Nishant Singh Malkani – as Adhiraj Singh
- Jaineeraj Rajpurohit – as Mr Saxena
- Deepak Pareek – as Professor Shukla

== Series overview ==
Season	Episodes	Originally aired
Season	Episodes	First aired	Last aired
1	433	20 August 2007	21 September 2009
2	289	22 September 2009	29 October 2010

== Production ==
=== Development ===
After the end of Sanjivani: A Medical Boon, Siddharth P. Malhotra decided to make Dill Mill Gayye as a sequel of the show. The actor Mohnish Bahl reprised his role of Dr. Shashank from Sanjivani and was the only common link between the shows.

It was not supposed to be a long running show. The initial plan was to wrap up within a couple of episodes, but due to positive response from audience within three weeks, the creative team decided to extend it.

In an interview with Times of India, Pankit Thakker talked about three actresses playing the role of Dr. Riddhima Gupta and stated that:

All of them had different personalities. Shilpa was the first Riddhima and our bond together was very strong. Then came Sukirti and Dr. Riddhima’s went through certain changes. Actually, their on-screen characters were written as per their personalities. All the characters were sketched like that.

=== Casting ===
Earlier, Haroon Qazi was cast as Dr. Armaan but due to creative differences he was replaced with Karan Singh Grover. Karan Singh Grover and Shilpa Anand played the main characters Dr. Armaan and Dr. Riddhima.

Anand initially auditioned for the role of Dr. Anjali Gupta, but the casting team selected her to play the lead, Dr. Riddhima Gupta. Later, Sunaina Gulia was cast for in the role of Dr. Anjali. Pankit Thakker was originally paired up with Muskaan Mihani. But he believed his chemistry with Muskaan was mostly coming out friendly. Hence, he discussed with the creative directors if they could change the track so they'd paired him up with Sunaina.

In May 2008, Anand quit the show due to differences between the production house and to pursue a career in Bollywood. She was replaced by Sukirti Kandpal, who had auditioned for a role in 2007 but was originally rejected by the casting team. Later in April 2009, Kandpal also quit the show and was replaced by Jennifer Winget.

In June 2009, Mayank Anand quit Dill Mill Gayye to pursue a career as a book writer. Later Karan Singh Grover also quit the show to work in Bollywood. Nearing the end of September 2009, the whole cast was changed and a second season was introduced with five new actors, Karan Wahi, Moulshree Sachdeva, Sehban Azim, Neha Jhulka and Prasad Barve.

In March 2010, Karan Singh Grover and later in June 2010, Shilpa Anand returned to the show on fans' demands. After coming back two years later, Anand played a different character, Dr. Shilpa Malhotra, and once again she was paired opposite Karan Singh Grover.

In May 2010, Neha Jhulka quit the show as she was not happy with her storyline.

=== Filming ===
In 2008, during shoot of a basketball playing scene actress Shilpa Anand began feeling unwell and almost passed out on the set due to over heat, but she continued shooting.

=== Special scenes ===
The series had shot many scenes that resemble some scenes from Bollywood. "The aur pass" scene and Lonavala sequence between Karan Singh Grover and Shilpa Anand were inspired by the Bollywood film Dil Toh Pagal Hai.

== Reception ==
=== Critics ===
The Times of India reported that Dill Mill Gayye was a TRP-tripper when Karan Singh Grover and Shilpa Anand played Dr. Armaan and Dr. Riddhima and also stated that their sizzling on-screen chemistry took the show to new highs. In 2012, They listed Karan Singh Grover among "Big icons of Small Screen" and stated that he was a huge teenage icon in 2007. Even one and half year after the show going off air, there were demands for another season.

Shweta Ksheri of India Today wrote, "With a fresh cast and a new storyline, the romantic medical drama was successful in attracting the younger lot."

=== Ratings ===
It was the number 1 show on Star One in 2007 to 2008. In January 2008, it entered in top Hindi GEC list garnering 2.47 TRP. These TRPS occurred when the character Riddhima confessed her love to Armaan.

== Controversy ==
In an exclusive Interview with Spotboye, Shilpa Anand revealed that she quit the show in 2008 because she had a fight with the executive producer during the shoot of the "Zara Zara Touch Me Touch Me" dance sequence. Her replacements were not well-received by the audience and her exit caused a sizeable drop in the ratings.

In 2009, when Sukirti Kandpal quit the show, the producer Siddharth P. Malhotra approached Shilpa Anand for returning to Dill Mill Gayye but she asked for high amount of money, which caused a conflict between her and the producer. Cinevistaas Limited stated that they lodged a complaint against Karan Singh Grover for routinely reporting hours late for work, which made them incur a loss, and that actress Jennifer Winget slapped him on the set. They did not speak to each other for months and shot their scenes separately at two different times. The second season of the show didn’t do well.

In 2010, a rumor spread that the rest of the three actors – Jennifer Winget, Karan Wahi and Karan Singh Grover – were unhappy about the focus shifting to Dr. Shilpa Malhotra. Later, Shilpa Anand's storyline with Karan Singh Grover was abruptly cut short. On 29 October 2010, the series went off air due to low TRP.

== Soundtrack ==
Original sound tracks
No.	Title	Lyrics	Music	Singer(s)	Length
1.	"Dill Mill Gayye" (Duet)	Amitabh Verma	Raju Singh	Sonu Nigam & Prajakta Shukre	1:01
2.	"Dill Mill Gayye – Sad Version" (Male)	Amitabh Verma	Raju Singh	Sonu Nigam	1:37
3.	"Asmaani Rang Ho" (Duet)	Amitabh Verma	Raju Singh	Ali Haider & Aishwarya Majumdar	4:11
4.	"Asmaani Rang Ho" (Female)	Amitabh Verma	Raju Singh	Aishwarya Majumdar	1:40
5.	"Asmaani Rang Ho" (Male)	Amitabh Verma	Raju Singh	Ali Haider	1:57
6.	"Ishq Leta Hain Kaise Imtehaan" (Male)	Amitabh Verma	Raju Singh	Ripul Sharma	5:01
7.	"Kaisa Hain Yeh Khumar" (Duet)	TBA	TBA	TBA	4:09
8.	"O Mere Saajna" (Male)	TBA	TBA	TBA	2:17

- Background musics by Raju Singh

Background Musics
No.	Title	Length
1.	"Dill Mill Gayye title track Instrumental"	0:35
2.	"Dill Mill Gayye Whistle"	0:08
3.	"Dill Mill Gayye Instrumental"	0:17

== Awards and nominations ==
Year	Award	Category	Nominee	Result	Ref(s)
2007	Kalakar Awards	Best Promising Star	Karan Singh Grover	Won	
2008	Indian Telly Awards	Best Actor in a Leading Role (popular)	Karan Singh Grover	Nominated	
2008	Indian Telly Awards	Best Ensemble	Dill Mill Gayye	Nominated	
2008	Indian Telly Awards	Best Daily Serial	Cinevistaas Limited	Nominated	
2008	Gold Awards	Best Television Show (Fiction)	Dill Mill Gayye	Nominated	
2008	Gold Awards	Best Actor in a Lead Role (popular)	Karan Singh Grover	Nominated	
2008	The Global Indian Film & TV Honours	Best Onscreen Couple	Karan Singh Grover & Shilpa Anand	Nominated	
2008	Star Guild Awards	Best Costume Design	Sapna Malhotra	Nominated	
2008	New Talent Awards	Best Actress in Leading Role	Shilpa Anand	Nominated	
2008	Indian Television Academy Awards	GR8 Face Of The Year	Karan Singh Grover	Nominated	
2008	Indian Television Academy Awards	Best On-Screen Couple	Karan Singh Grover & Shilpa Anand	Won	
2009	Indian Television Academy Awards	Best Singer	Sonu Nigam	Won	
2009	Gold Awards	Best Actor in a Comic Role	Pankit Thakker	Nominated	
2010	Indian Telly Awards	Best Youth Show	Dill Mill Gayye	Won	
2010	Indian Telly Awards	Fresh New Face – Female	Neha Jhulka	Nominated	
2010	Indian Telly Awards	Best Actor in a Comic Role	Prasad Barve	Nominated	
2010	Gold Awards	Debut in a Lead Role (Female)	Neha Jhulka	Nominated	
2011	Star Guild Awards	Best Fiction Series	Dill Mill Gayye	Nominated	
2011	Star Guild Awards	Best Ensemble Cast	Dill Mill Gayye	Nominated	
2012	Indian Telly Awards	Best Youth Show	Dill Mill Gayye	Nominated	
