= 3 Dev =

Indian Hindi-language comedy film

- Directed by: Ankoosh Bhatt
- Written by: Ghalib Asad Bhopali; Subodh Pandey
- Screenplay by: Ghalib Asad Bhopali
- Produced by: Chitan Rana; Rupal Parmar
- Starring: Karan Singh Grover; Prosenjit Chatterjee; Ravi Dubey; Kunaal Roy Kapur; Raima Sen; Tisca Chopra
- Cinematography: Soni Singh
- Music by: Sajid–Wajid
- Production company: R2 Phillum Productions
- Distributed by: Sky Entertainment; Batra Showbiz
- Running time: 122 minutes
- Country: India
- Language: Hindi

3 Dev is an unreleased Indian Hindi-language comedy film written and directed by Ankoosh Bhatt. The film stars Karan Singh Grover, Kunaal Roy Kapur, Ravi Dubey, Tisca Chopra and Raima Sen in the prominent roles while Prosenjit Chatterjee and Kay Kay Menon in the supportive roles. The film is produced by Chitan Rana of R2 Phillum Productions and cinematography for the film is handled by Soni Singh. The Bollywood musical duo Sajid–Wajid will compose and score music for the film.

== Cast ==
- Karan Singh Grover as Vishnu
- Kunaal Roy Kapur as Mahesh/Shiva
- Ravi Dubey as Brahma
- Priya Banerjee as Vani
- Poonam Kaur as Radha
- Raima Sen as Bhairavi
- Kay Kay Menon as Shanu/Satyavan
- Tisca Chopra as Savitri
- Prosenjit Chatterjee as Professor
- Puja Banerjee as an item number "Ban Dance Mein Kutta"

== Production ==
The film titled as 3 Dev depicts and implies the three main gods in Hinduism namely Vishnu, Brahma and Shiva. The tagline of the film is Undercover Bhagwan. The role of Vishnu is played by Karan Singh Grover, the role of Brahma is played by Ravi Dubey and the role of Shiva is played by Kunaal Roy Kapur in the film. The first look poster of the film was unveiled on 27 March 2018 by Varun Dhawan.

== Soundtrack ==
All songs of the film were scored by duo Sajid–Wajid and lyrics are penned by Kausar Munir, Shabbir Ahmed, and Amitabh Bhattacharya.

Track listing
No.	Title	Lyrics	Singer(s)	Length
1.	"Nikkamma"	Kausar Munir	Rahat Fateh Ali Khan	4:46
2.	"Ban Dance Mein Kutta"	Shabbir Ahmed	Divya Kumar, Uvie & Shivi

== Controversy ==
The film received flak for releasing a poster featuring Trimurti.
