= Kitni Mast Hai Zindagi =

- Created by: Ekta Kapoor
- Screenplay by: Nina Arora; Fatima Rangila
- Directed by: Anil V. Kumar
- Theme music composer: Vishal–Shekhar
- Opening theme: "Kitni Mast Hai Zindagi" performed by Sunidhi Chauhan
- Country of origin: India
- Original language: Hindi
- No. of seasons: 1
- No. of episodes: 107

Production
- Producers: Shobha Kapoor; Ekta Kapoor
- Editor: Vikas Sharma
- Camera setup: Multi-camera
- Running time: 22-24 min.
- Production company: Balaji Telefilms

Original release
- Network: MTV India
- Release: 25 October 2004 – 18 May 2005

Kitni Mast Hai Zindagi(transl. How Fun Life Is) is an Indian teen drama television series that aired on MTV India from 25 October 2004 to 18 May 2005. It was produced by Balaji Telefilms. It starred Panchi Bora, Yash Tonk, Karan Singh Grover, Barkha Sengupta and Manasi Parekh.

== Overview ==
The series revolves around the life of Ananya, a small-town girl from Kanpur who wishes to make it big in Mumbai, while abiding by her own ideals. She auditions for an RJ position at one of the leading radio stations in Mumbai, where she, coincidentally, meets her childhood friend "Jo" Jyoti. However, her life takes the first twist even before the audition as she bumps into the flamboyant Station Manager Arnav that resulted to a cold interaction between the two alongside their first bad impression of each other. Despite the odds regarding Ananya's selection, Joe, alongside her friend 'Cutie Pie' Udita hitches a plan to ensure a job for Ananya in their company. However, the rankings reveal that the best she could get is the position of a secretary. A disheartened Ananya faces another blow when she is mocked at and bullied for her dressing at the office-party, courtesy to the gang, led by Arnav. Following the crude realization, Ananya runs off feeling dejected and embarrassed and runs into the Samit, the big boss of the company, who she shouts on unknowingly. On the same night, she is, surprisingly consoled by Sameera who she, initially, took as a stern woman. With the disagreements and banters going in between a newly appointed Ananya and her boss, Arnav, the two unknowingly comes closer. Pouring out his feelings to Ananya, Arnav asks her to be his girlfriend which she gladly accepts. Ananya also, develops strong bonds with a strong-willed yet compassionate Jo, a dim-witted yet loving Udita and a level-headed Sameera. The girls, along with, Arnav becomes the life-bloods of Ananya in her new journey.

However, with the dreams of a new life brimming in her eyes, she is shocked to realize Arnav's indifference in taking their relationship to marriage. It is fuelled by Arnav's unexpected hook-up with Udita at a pub house. Upon knowing, a livid Ananya slaps Arnav in public, thus, marking their break-up and Arnav leaving for Singapore.

Moreover, a shattered Ananya was never able to win the confidence of the boss, Samit which makes her part ways with her job and decides to take up a job at a book store. She starts spending more time with her family as a means of distraction and encourages her mother to go for the long-awaited publication of her book. Coincidentally, Samit is revealed to be the owner of the book store. As he sees Ananya in the store, he, somehow, understands her situation and out of an apparent empathy, recruits her back to the company. However, he still seems critical to her work that makes Ananya frustrated. Working together, Samit and Ananya also realize things about each other that they never thought about before.

Things change as her roadshow becomes a major success. Samit drops his haughty attitude and extends his hand of friendship towards Ananya, which she gladly accepts. Samit's kind-hearted and caring demeanor towards her beneath his professional sensibility amuses Ananya. Samit, too, understands Ananya's dreams and becomes her protective shield. The two unknowingly becomes attached to each other while knowing many things that were unsaid.

== Cast ==
- Panchi Bora as Ananya
- Karan Singh Grover as Arnav
- Yash Tonk as Samit
- Barkha Bisht as Udita
- Manasi Parekh as Jyoti "Jo"
- Shivalika Sharma as Sameera
- Shalin Bhanot as Rajat
- Praneet Bhat
