= Alone (2015 Hindi film) =

2015 Indian film by Bhushan Patel

- Theatrical release poster
- Directed by: Bhushan Patel
- Based on: Alone by: Banjong Pisanthanakun; Parkpoom Wongpoom
- Produced by: Kumar Mangat Pathak; Abhishek Pathak; Pradeep Agarwal; Prashant Sharma
- Starring: Bipasha Basu; Karan Singh Grover; Zakir Hussain
- Cinematography: Prakash Kutty
- Music by: Ankit Tiwari; Mithoon; Jeet Gannguli; Raghav Sachar
- Production company: Panorama Studios
- Release date: 16 January 2015
- Running time: 134 minutes
- Country: India
- Language: Hindi
- Budget: ₹19 crore
- Box office: est. ₹25.84 crore (US$2.7 million)

Alone is a 2015 Indian horror film directed by Bhushan Patel, starring Bipasha Basu and Karan Singh Grover. The film is a remake of the 2007 Thai film of the same name.

== Plot ==
The film starts on a stormy night in Bangalore. A large tree branch falls and breaks the roof of an apartment. The woman inspecting the outhouse ends up in a hospital.

In another town, the woman's daughter, Sanjana, and her husband, Kabir, argue about not being able to celebrate her birthday together. Sanjana gets a call about her mother's accident and they quickly fly to Bangalore.

In Bangalore, Sanjana begins having visions that make her believe her dead conjoined twin's soul is after her. Her husband does not believe her and sends her to his former professor for spiritual healing.

During the treatment period, she tells the professor about how her conjoined twin sister Anjana always hated that Kabir liked Sanjana more than her. In fact, it was when Kabir told Sanjana that he was coming back home from abroad that Sanjana decided to separate from Anjana. It was during this operation that Anjana died, and Sanjana blames herself for her sister's death. The professor reassures Sanjana that her visions of Anjana are the result of her guilt and only a figment of her subconscious mind.

At her mother's place that night, Sanjana is forced into the outhouse by an unseen entity. Hearing noises, Kabir wakes up and finds her unconscious in the outhouse. When Sanjana awakes, she is possessed by Anjana's soul. After this, Sanjana/Anjana can't get enough of Kabir. When the professor meets her again, he feels there is something wrong and tells Kabir to keep an eye on her, which she overhears.

The caretaker suggests that a ritual should be performed on Sanjana/Anjana. After the ritual, Anjana's stranglehold on Sanjana escalates and her true colors are shown, resulting in an exorcist being called in.

During the kanjar, Anjana reveals that she was murdered. As she leaves Sanjana's body, she urges Kabir to discover the truth of her death. After Sanjana wakes up, Kabir threatens to leave her. Sanjana tells him that years ago when he called her to tell Sanjana that he was coming home, Anjana lost her mind and tried to kill her because she had feelings for Kabir too. In self-defense, Sanjana hit Anjana on the head with a glass music box, killing her. Their mother covered the truth to protect her daughter. After consulting with the professor, they try to find and burn the last possession of Anjana and set her soul free.

Sanjana, Kabir, the caretaker, and her daughter-in-law all follow the music leading to the outhouse. Under the floor, they find Anjana's corpse. The caretaker and her daughter-in-law go inside to get kerosene with which to burn the body. They both die at the hands of Anjana's soul. The professor arrives at the outhouse with kerosene, but is possessed by Anjana and tries to attack Sanjana. While Kabir fights him, he finds the locket he gave to Sanjana when they were young on Anjana's corpse. When he confronts Sanjana, she confesses that she is actually Anjana. She tells him that she killed Sanjana with the music box and took her sister's place so she could be with Kabir. Outraged, Kabir decides to leave her despite her pleas that she loves him. Sanjana (now revealed to be Anjana) hits him on the head with a chair to stop him from leaving and he falls. Anjana tries to kill Kabir with a pair of scissors but is stopped by Sanjana's soul, the burning roof falls on Anjana thus killing her and professor saves Kabir. Kabir sees Sanjana's soul smiling at him and then disappearing in the fire.

== Cast ==
- Bipasha Basu as Sanjana/Anjana (dual role)
- Karan Singh Grover as Kabir
- Sagar Saikia as Prithvi
- Zakir Hussain as Psychiatrist
- Neena Gupta as The Twins' Mother
- Sunny Hawlader as Raj
- Sneha Vaidya as Child Sanjana
- Sowmya Vaidya as Child Anjana
- Dino Morea as Kabir Singh

== Reception ==
=== Critical response ===
The film received mixed reviews. Trade Analyst Komal Nahta predicted that the film would do well at the box office, and praised the lead actor, writing that "Bipasha Basu does a splendid job...Karan Singh Grover makes Breakups an impressive Rajneesh Duggal debut on the big screen. He looks handsome and has screen presence. He acts very ably."

India TV stated that "With some genuine scary moments and Bipasha-Karan's scorching chemistry, Alone stands apart from numerous horrible horror flicks made in the past. Bipasha Basu as a terrified lady in the beginning while as a ghost herself shines, Karan Singh Gorver flaunts his acting skills with same exactness that he carries while flaunting his body when required."

Some reviewers were more critical, however. Filmfare praised the two lead actors, but gave film 3 stars, stating that "The only reason why Alone will work is for its erotic packaging. Those looking for a genuine scary movie will only get bad rehashes of scenes from The Conjuring and other popular Hollywood fare." Times of India gave it a 2.5 and said, "When you scratch the surface, you don't end up scared shitless. And isn't that what Alone is meant to do?"

Bollywood Hungama gave it 2 stars and said "On the whole, Alone is a below average fare that has a commendable performance by Bipasha Basu" Praising debutant Karan SIngh Grovers performance, it says "Karan Singh Grover makes a sprightly debut. He's not conscious of the camera at all. Considering he has done TV, he is high on emotional appeal. He has all the trappings of being a star but he needs to choose his films more wisely. "

Zee News gave 1.5 stars out of 5 and wrote, "The scenes have been lifted from various English horror films and although they have been executed fairly, they leave you a little disappointed." The CNN IBN critic Rajeev Masand stated, "I'm going with one-and-a-half out of five for Alone. You'll wish you'd stayed home instead."

Critic Saibal Chatterjee of NDTV gave it a rating of 2 stars out of 5 and wrote, "Alone is strictly for those that have an insatiable appetite for cinematic concoctions that serve up the dual dose of sex and horror." however, the film received negative reviews from the US Cinema.

Subhara gupta of The Indian Express gave it 1.5 stars out of 5 and stated it has very few mild scares.

=== Box office ===
Box Office India stated that Alone had the highest opening of the four major films released in its weekend, opening with 50% occupancy nationwide and full houses at some single screens. Daily News and Analysis stated that Alone's business of Rs 140 million and modest budget allowed for a good financial return. FilmFare also reported that the movie had a good weekend making 146.5 million in the opening weekend.

== Soundtrack ==
Alone

Soundtrack album by Ankit Tiwari, Mithoon, Jeet Gannguli and Raghav Sachar
- Released: 3 January 2015
- Genre: Feature film soundtrack
- Length: 20:06
- Label: T-Series
- Producer: Kumar Mangat
External audio
- Audio Jukebox on YouTube

The music was composed by Ankit Tiwari, Mithoon, Raghav Sachar and Jeet Gannguli. The album consists of 4 songs. The song "Touch My Body" was from Dr.Zeus song "Don't Be Shy" from the album 'Rouge' by Rouge, with lyrics written by Lola Olafis, which was then recreated the second time in Bala (2019) by Sachin–Jigar, with vocals by Badshah, Shalmali Kholgade, and Gurdeep Mehendi.

Track listing
No.	Title	Lyrics	Music	Singer(s)	Length
1.	"Katra Katra"	Abhay Upadhyay	Ankit Tiwari	Ankit Tiwari, Prakriti Kakar	6:21
2.	"Awaara"	Mithoon	Mithoon	Altamash Faridi, Saim Bhatt	5:12
3.	"Chand Aasmano Se Laapata"	Sandeep Nath	Jeet Gannguli	Bhaven Dhanak	4:47
4.	"Touch My Body"	Kumaar	Raghav Sachar	Aditi Singh Sharma	3:46
5.	"Awaara" (Sad Version)	Mithoon	Mithoon	Altamash Faridi	5:12
Total length:					25:18
