= Karan Singh Grover =

Indian model and actor (born 1982)

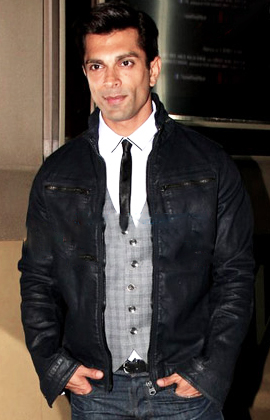
- Grover promoting Hate Story 3 in 2015
- Born: 23 February 1982 (age 44); New Delhi, India
- Occupations: Actor; Model
- Years active: 2004–present
- Spouses: Shraddha Nigam (m. 2008; div. 2009); Jennifer Winget (m. 2012; div. 2014); Bipasha Basu (m. 2016)
- Children: 1

Signature
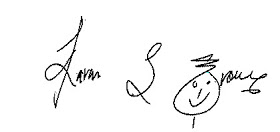

Karan Singh Grover (born 23 February 1982) is an Indian model and actor known for his work in television series such as Dill Mill Gayye and Qubool Hai. He has also starred in Hindi films like Alone and Hate Story 3.

In 2019, Grover made a comeback to television with Kasautii Zindagii Kay 2 as Mr. Rishabh Bajaj. In 2019, Grover also made his digital debut with BOSS: Baap of Special Services. In 2020, he appeared in the action-thriller web series Dangerous. In 2021, he appeared in the web series Qubool Hai 2.0, the reboot of Qubool Hai. In 2024, Grover starred in the film Fighter.

== Early life ==
Grover was born on 23 February 1982 in New Delhi, India to a Punjabi Sikh family. He has a younger brother. When Grover was young, his family moved to Al Khobar, Saudi Arabia. He did his schooling from International Indian School, Dammam Saudi Arabia, and pursued a degree in Hotel Management from IHM Mumbai. He then worked as a Marketing Executive in the Sheraton Hotel in Oman.

== Career ==
In 2004, Grover participated in the Gladrags Manhunt Contest and won the award for the "Most Popular Model." Also in 2004, he began his television career with Balaji Telefilms' youth show Kitni Mast Hai Zindagi on MTV India, for which he was chosen after a nationwide talent hunt conducted by the production house.

In 2007, Grover starred in the show Dill Mill Gayye, a medical youth drama. The Times of India reported that Grover became an "instant hit" and a "teenage icon" due to the show, and that the show became the no.1 show on STAR One. Whilst shooting for Dill Mill Gayye, Grover also participated in a few reality shows and was also seen in several advertisements.

Two years later, Cinevistaas Limited stated that they had lodged a complaint against Grover for routinely reporting hours late for work, which made them incur a loss. Grover left the show for a while, but returned after 6 months due to fan demands. The show ended on 29 October 2010. After Dill Mill Gayye, Grover did two shows with Cinevistaas Limited. He featured in their telefilm Teri Meri Love Stories, and made a cameo appearance in Dil Dosti Dance.

On 29 October 2012, Grover returned to daily fiction with 4 Lions Films' Qubool Hai. The show gained popularity quite early, becoming the number 2 show of Indian Television. The Times of India gave Grover the credit for the high television ratings of the show. Grover won two Best Actor Popular Awards for his portrayal of Asad Ahmed Khan in the show. In 2013, Grover was described as one of the highest paid Indian Television Actors.

Grover's work at Qubool Hai ended at the end of 2013. The channel, Zee TV, said that it had fired him because of his unprofessional behaviour. He denied the allegations, saying that the channel was trying to defame him, and stated that he left because his contract ended and due to ill health. Grover's exit caused a sizeable drop in the ratings of the show.

In 2015, Grover featured in the films Alone and Hate Story 3. Hate Story 3 became a box office success. The International Business Times reviewed Hate Story 3 and wrote "Audiences say Karan Singh Grover steals the show."

In August 2019, Grover made his digital debut in Alt Balaji's web series BOSS: Baap of Special Services. In June 2019, Grover made a comeback to television after six years with Kasautii Zindagii Kay as Mr. Rishabh Bajaj. This made Grover the highest paid TV actor, as he charged 3 lakhs per day. In October, Grover quit the show, and fans requested him to make a comeback. He returned to the show four months later. Later, he quit the show again.

In 2020, due to COVID-19 pandemic Grover's show Qubool Hai repeated on prime time TV. Also in 2020, Grover starred opposite his wife Bipasha Basu for the second time in crime drama web series Dangerous.

In 2021, Grover starred in the web series Qubool Hai 2.0, which is a reboot of the 2012 Zee TV soap opera Qubool Hai.

Grover has also signed the projects 3 Dev. In 2024, Grover starred in Siddharth Anand's action film Fighter.

== Personal life ==
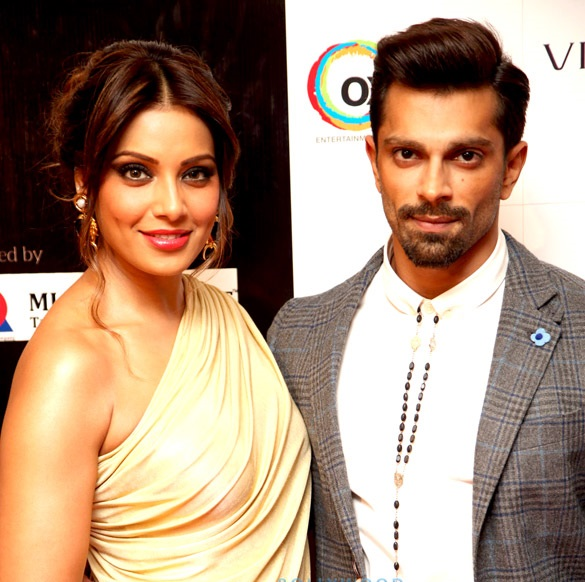
Grover with his wife Bipasha Basu

Grover married actress Shraddha Nigam on 2 December 2008. They divorced after 10 months. He married Jennifer Winget on 9 April 2012. The couple divorced in 2014. Grover married actress Bipasha Basu on 30 April 2016. On 12 November 2022, Grover and Basu's daughter, Devi Basu Singh Grover was born. In 2023, Basu revealed that Devi was diagnosed with ventricular septal defect (VSD), a condition involving two holes in the heart, just three days after birth. Devi underwent open‑heart surgery when she was three months old, and has been doing well since the successful procedure.

== Filmography ==
Key
†	Denotes films that have not yet been released

=== Films ===
Year	Title	Role	Ref.
2008	Bhram	Carlson	
2012	I M 24	–	
2015	Alone	Kabir	
2015	Hate Story 3	Saurav Singhania / Fake Vikram Dewan / Karan Singhania	
2024	Fighter	Sartaj "Taj" Gill	

=== Television ===
Year	Title	Role	Notes	Ref(s)
2004–2005	Kitni Mast Hai Zindagi	Arnav Deol		
2005	Princess Dollie Aur Uska Magic Bag	Aman		
2005–2006	Kasautii Zindagii Kay	Sharad Gupta		
2006–2007	Solhah Singaarr	Abhimanyu		
2007	C.I.D	Samir	Episode "Body in Mid Air"	
2007	C.I.D	Rahul	Episode "The Case of the Invisible Killer"	
2007	Parrivaar	Adhiraj Shergill		
2007–2010	Dill Mill Gayye	Dr. Armaan Malik		
2007	Nach Baliye 3			
2008	Zara Nachke Dikha 1	Host		
2009	Jhalak Dikhhla Jaa 3	Contestant	2nd runner-up	
2009	Idea Rocks India	Host		
2010	Fear Factor: Khatron Ke Khiladi 3	Contestant	9th place	
2011	Perfect Couple	Host		
2012	Teri Meri Love Stories	Raghu	Episode 3: A Second Chance	
2012	Dil Dosti Dance	Professor Karan Mallik		
2012–2013	Qubool Hai	Asad Ahmed Khan		
2014	Star Masti Holi Gulaal Ki	Host	Television special	
2019–2020	Kasautii Zindagii Kay 2	Rishabh Bajaj		

=== Web series ===
Year	Title	Role	Ref.
2019	BOSS: Baap of Special Services	Sudhir Kohli/Keshav Khatri	
2020	Dangerous	Aditya Dhanraj	
2021	Qubool Hai 2.0	Asad Ahmed Khan	

== Accolades ==
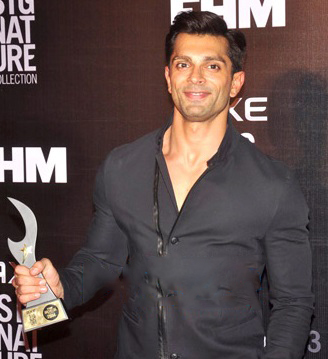
Grover at the FHM Awards

Year	Award	Category	Work	Result	Source
2004	Gladrags Manhunt Contest	Most Popular Model Award		Won	
2007	Kalakar Awards	Best Promising Star	Dill Mill Gayye	Won	
2008	Indian Telly Awards	Best Actor in a Lead Role (popular)	Dill Mill Gayye	Nominated	
2008	Indian Television Academy Awards	Best On-Screen Couple (with Shilpa Anand)	Dill Mill Gayye	Won	
2008	Gold Awards	Best Actor in a Lead Role (popular)	Dill Mill Gayye	Nominated	
2008	Indian Television Academy Awards	GR8 Face Of The Year	Dill Mill Gayye	Nominated	
2008	The Global Indian Film & TV Honours	Best Onscreen Couple (with Shilpa Anand)	Dill Mill Gayye	Nominated	
2008	Indian Telly Awards	Best Anchor	Zara Nachke Dikha	Nominated	
2010	Gold Awards	Most Fit Actor (Male)	—N/a	Won	
2013	Indian Telly Awards	Best Onscreen Couple (with Surbhi Jyoti)	Qubool Hai	Nominated	
2013	Indian Telly Awards	Best Actor in a Lead Role	Qubool Hai	Nominated	
2013	Indian Telly Awards	Best Television Personality of the Year	Qubool Hai	Won	
2013	Indian Television Academy Awards	Desh Ka Sitara – Best Actor Popular	Qubool Hai	Won	
2013	Indian Television Academy Awards	Best Actor Drama	Qubool Hai	Nominated	
2013	Zee Gold Awards	Best Onscreen Jodi (with Surbhi Jyoti)	Qubool Hai	Won	
2013	Zee Gold Awards	Best Actor Popular	Qubool Hai	Won	
2017	Zee Gold Awards	Rising Star	Bollywood	Won	
2019	Zee Gold Awards	Best Actor Negative (Popular)	Kasautii Zindagii Kay	Won	

== See also ==
- List of Indian television actors
- List of Indian film actors
