= Bhushan Patel =

Indian film director

- Born: Mumbai, India
- Other names: Bhooshan Patel
- Occupations: Film director, cinematographer, actor

Bhushan Patel (born in Mumbai, India) is a Bollywood film director, actor and cinematographer, best known for directing the horror movies 1920: Evil Returns, Ragini MMS 2 and Alone.

== Personal life ==
Bhushan Patel is a Gujarati. His father was a cameraman. Patel studied at Jamnabai Narsee School and lived at Vile Parle next to Vikram Bhatt, another director he became friends with.

== Filmography ==
=== As director ===
- Lipstick (co-director)
- Aathvaan Vachan
- Dwarkadheesh: Bhagwaan Shree Krishn (TV Series) (episode director)
- 1920: Evil Returns
- Ragini MMS 2
- Alone
- Time Machine
- Amavas
- Thok De Haseena
- P. S. I. Arjun

=== As Cinematographer ===
- Gunehgar
- Dastak (as Bhooshan Patel)
- Bambai Ka Babu (as Bhooshan Patel)
- Tamanna (as Bhooshan Patel)
- Kartoos
- Yeh Hai Mumbai Meri Jaan (as Bhooshan Patel)

=== As actor ===
- Phir Teri Kahani Yaad Aayee
- Junoon
