= Poorva Gokhale =

Indian television actress (born 1978)

- Born: Poorva Gupte; 20 January 1978 (age 48); Thane, Maharashtra, India
- Occupation: Actress
- Years active: 2001–2010; 2017–present

Poorva Gokhale (born 20 January) is a Marathi TV actress known for her role as Anupriya in Zee TV's series Tujhse Hai Raabta. She was spotted first in 2001 Marathi serial Rimjhim along with Sunil Barve.

== Career ==
As a teen, Gokhale co-starred in the Hindi series Kkoi Dil Mein Hai which focused on two very different friends. Gokhale played a quieter and more traditional girl in contrast to Karishma Tanna's role of an outgoing flirt.

She later appeared in the Hindi TV series Kahaani Ghar Ghar Kii as Gunn Krishna Agarwal. She has also starred in a Hindi Music Album named Boondein. She was the lead actress in Zee Marathi's series Kulvadhu.

She has acted in the Marathi stage plays Smile Please and "Selfie." She received her first movie role in 2020. It was a Marathi movie named Bhaybheet.

Later, she played as Anupriya Sarthak Rane in Zee TV's series Tujhse Hai Raabta. She played the negative role of Revati Rakesh Choudhary in StarPlus' series Yeh Hai Chahatein.

She is currently playing the role of Kadambari Vivek Lamba in SET's series Barsatein – Mausam Pyaar Ka.

== Television ==
Year	Serial	Role	Channel	Notes	Co–Star
2003–2005	Kkoi Dil Mein Hai	Kajal Arjun Punj	Sony Entertainment Television	Lead Role	Sandeep Baswana; Amit Sadh; Hiten Tejwani; Eijaz Khan
2004-2007	Kahaani Ghar Ghar Kii	Advocate Gunn Krishna Agarwal	Star Plus	Supporting Role	Sachin Sharma; Chetan Hansraj; Sameer Sharma
2008–2010	Kulvadhu	Devyani Rajeshirke	Zee Marathi	Lead Role	Subodh Bhave
2017	Swarajyarakshak Sambhaji	Maharani Sai Bhonsale	Zee Marathi	Supporting Role	Shantanu Moghe
2017–2019	Phulpakharu	Archana	Zee Yuva	Supporting Role	Prasad Oak
2018–2021	Tujhse Hai Raabta	Anupriya Atul Deshmukh / Anupriya Sarthak Rane	Zee TV	Lead Role / Supporting Role	Pankaj Vishnu; Rajat Dahiya
2021	Jau Nako Dur... Baba	Shubhada	Sun Marathi	Cameo Role	Astad Kale
2022–2023	Yeh Hai Chahatein	Police Commissioner Revati Rakesh Choudhary	Star Plus	Negative Role	Yajuvendra Singh
2023–2024	Barsatein – Mausam Pyaar Ka	Kadambari Vivek Lamba	Sony Entertainment Television	Supporting Role	Sameer Malhotra
2024–2025	Jhanak	Srishti Vinayak Mukherjee	Star Plus	Negative Role	Saurabh Agarwal
2026-present	Veen Doghantali Hi Tutena	Kimaya Chitnis	Zee Marathi	Supporting Role	
2026-present	Apsara	Niritti alias Saira Kapoor	Star Plus	Negative Role	
