= Sandeep Baswana =

Indian television actor

- Born: Hisar, Haryana, India
- Occupation: Actor
- Years active: 2002–present
- Known for: Kyunki Saas Bhi Kabhi Bahu Thi; Tujh Sang Preet Lagai Sajna; Parvarrish – Season 2; Dil Diyaan Gallaan
- Spouse: Ashlesha Sawant (m. 2025)

Sandeep Baswana is an Indian actor who primarily works in Hindi television. Baswana is best known for his portrayal of Sahil Virani in Kyunki Saas Bhi Kabhi Bahu Thi and Rajveer Sherawat in Tujh Sang Preet Lagai Sajna.

== Personal life ==
Baswana met actress Ashlesha Sawant in 2002, on the sets of Kyunki Saas Bhi Kabhi Bahu Thi and they eventually began dating. After being together for 23 years, Baswana and Sawant finally married on 16 November 2025 in Vrindavan.

== Career ==
Baswana made his television debut with the show Kuchh Jhuki Palkain and followed up with Kkoi Dil Mein Hai. As both shows were successful daytime serials, Baswana became noticed. However, it was his portrayal of the character Sahil Virani in the successful show Kyunki Saas Bhi Kabhi Bahu Thi that established his career and made him a household name. Since then Baswana has done several cameos in other shows playing supporting roles. He then played the role of Munna in Zee TV's Hitler Didi. In 2014, he appeared in television serial Udaan, where he portrayed the role of Ishwar Rawat. He played the role of Dr. Mandeep "Maan" Singh Brar in Dil Diyaan Gallaan. Since December 2024, he played Girdhar Shukla in Colors TV's Apollena – Sapno Ki Unchi Udann.

== Television ==
Year	Serial	Role	Channel	Co–Star
2002	Kkusum	Kamal	Sony Entertainment Television	
2002	Kuchh Jhuki Palkain		Sony Entertainment Television	
2002–2003	Kammal	Manav Jajoo	Zee TV	Keerti Gaekwad Kelkar; Ashlesha Sawant
2002–2004; 2006–2008	Kyunki Saas Bhi Kabhi Bahu Thi	Sahil Virani	Star Plus	Shilpa Saklani; Suvarna Jha
2003	Kya Hadsaa Kya Haqeeqat – Kabzaa	Preet	Sony Entertainment Television	Narayani Shastri; Shweta Tiwari
2003–2004	Kkoi Dil Mein Hai	Samay Punj	Sony Entertainment Television	Poorva Gokhale; Karishma Tanna
2005	Rihaee	Ranjeet	Sony Entertainment Television	
2005–2006	Kkavyanjali	Shlok Nanda	Star Plus	
2006–2007	Kyaa Hoga Nimmo Kaa	Palash	Star One	
2007	Kasautii Zindagii Kay	Dr. Jatin	Star Plus	
2008–2009	Karam Apnaa Apnaa	Dr. Prateek	Star Plus	
2008–2010	Tujh Sang Preet Lagai Sajna	Rajveer Sherawat	Star Plus	Puja Banerjee
2010–2011	Sanjog Se Bani Sangini	Ratanesh Singh Rawat	Zee TV	Trishna Vivek
2011–2013	Hitler Didi	Munna Sharma	Zee TV	Smita Singh; Jasveer Kaur
2014–2015	Udaan	Collector Ishwar Rawat	Colors TV	Dolphin Dwivedi
2015–2016	Parvarrish - Season 2	Kulwinder Khurana	Sony Entertainment Television	Sangeeta Ghosh
2018–2019	Vish Ya Amrit: Sitara	Kuldeep Shekhawat	Colors TV	Shilpa Saklani
2020	Dil Jaise Dhadke... Dhadakne Do	Pankaj Rai	Star Plus	Piyali Munshi
2022–2023	Dil Diyaan Gallaan	Dr. Mandeep "Maan" Singh Brar	Sony SAB	Reema Vohra; Dolphin Dwivedi
2024–2025	Apollena – Sapno Ki Unchi Udann	Giridhar Shukla	Colors TV	Eva Shirali
2025; 2026	Kyunki Saas Bhi Kabhi Bahu Thi 2	Sahil Virani	Star Plus	
2026	Kyunki Rishton Ke Bhi Roop Badalte Hain	Sahil Virani	Star Plus	

=== Reality Shows ===
Year	Show	Role	Channel
	Khullja Sim Sim	Guest	Star Plus
	Kisme Kitna Hai Dum	Contestant	

== Director ==
Year	Film	References
2022	Haryana	

== Writer ==
Year	Film	References
2022	Haryana	
