= Kya Hadsaa Kya Haqeeqat =

Indian Hindi-language thriller anthology television show

- Screenplay by: Al-Raines; Mushtaq Shiekh; Jainesh Ejardar; Bobby Bhonsle
- Story by: Al-Raines; Mushtaq Shiekh
- Directed by: Anurag Basu; Santram Varma; Garry Bhinder; Yash Chauhan; Deepak Chavan
- Creative directors: Prashant Bhatt; Nivedita Basu; Preet Shetty
- Music by: Aashish Rego
- Opening theme: Kya Hadsaa Kya Haqeeqat by Sunidhi Chauhan
- Country of origin: India
- Original language: Hindi
- No. of episodes: 252

Production
- Producers: Ekta Kapoor; Shobha Kapoor
- Cinematography: Sanjay Memane
- Editors: Vinay Malu; Dhirendra Singh
- Running time: 52 minutes

Original release
- Network: Sony Entertainment Television
- Release: 16 August 2002 – 9 May 2004

Kya Hadsaa Kya Haqeeqat (transl. What is fiction, what is reality) is an Indian thriller anthology television show that was first broadcast on Sony Entertainment Television from 16 August 2002 to 9 May 2004. The broadcast consisted mainly of short stories in a mini format. The series went on hiatus from 9 February 2003 to 16 March 2003 due to the live telecast of 2003 Cricket World Cup on Sony Entertainment Television.

== Story ==
Episode 1–29

The story follows trials and tribulations of a gullible, young woman, Nikki, who leaves her hometown to start life afresh in a big city. Unfortunately, her unpleasant past follows her and she soon finds herself caught in a vortex of complex twists and turns and begins to fear for her safety. She realizes that reality can be stranger than fiction. Nikki is stalked by a hooded killer who, one by one, kills everyone around Nikki. Eventually Nikki meets dashing police inspector Raj and marries him. He vows to protect her, but then she realizes one shocking truth after another — neither can she trust her new family nor her own as everyone has secrets to hide and hidden agenda. Left to herself, Nikki has to expose dark shocking secrets before the killer gets her.

Finally, Nikki realises that the unpleasant past was not due to her boyfriend Raj but her father as an imposter who had made all the arrangements to kill her to usurp her property. The imposter was already married to someone else. Niki didn't have her mother since childhood but later found out that the imposter has made her mother mad and admitted to an asylum.

== Cast ==
1. Hadsaa (Episode 1 - episode 29)

- Pallavi Kulkarni / Geetanjali Tikekar as Neonika "Nikki" Chatterjee
- Rajeev Khandelwal as Inspector Raj Karmarkar: Nikki's husband
- Sumeet Sachdev as Rohit: Nikki's boyfriend and fiancé
- Smriti Irani as Smriti Karmarkar: Raj's fake younger sister
- Vishal Kotian as Veeru
- Rohini Hattangadi as Kanchan Bai: Raj and Smriti's fake mother
- Dolly Bindra as Sweety
- Ravee Gupta as Jaya: Raj's girlfriend
- Naseer Abdullah as Vikas: Rohit's step-father
- Madan Joshi as Mr. Karmarkar: Raj and Smriti's fake father
- Tejal Shah as Garima
- Nilofer Khan as Shweta Karmarkar
- Smita Kalpavriksha Gupta
- Rucha Gujarathi
- Prithvi Zutshi
- Amrita Prakash as Neonika's younger sister
- Sumein Bhat
- Digangana Suryavanshi

2. Kaali Shakti (Episode 30 - episode 47)

- Kiran Dubey as Avni
- Monalika Bhonsle as Shama
- Divya Khosla Kumar as Sameera
- Nikhil Arya as Kabir
- Zarina Wahab as Avni's mother
- Durga Jasraj as Chandni/Chandaalika

3. Kash-m-kash (Episode 48 to Episode 73)

- Alihassan Turabi as Kushal
- Poonam Joshi as Pragati
- Kanika Kohli as Niyati
- Namrata Thapa as Malini
- Ritu Shivpuri as Nisha: a ghost
- Sudesh Berry as Professor Chatterjee

4. Kaboo (Episode 74 to Episode 98)

- Shilpa Saklani as Pooja
- Rakshanda Khan as Devyani, an evil spirit who is also Pooja's best friend
- Siddharth Choudhary as Vikram: Pooja's husband
- Vishal Watwani as Karan: Pooja's cousin
- Pratima Kazmi as Bhaarini Tantrik
- Neelam Mehra as Vikram's mother
- Pooja Gandhi as Nikita
- Radhakrishna Dutta as Vikram's father
- Madhumalati Kapoor as Beeji
- Nitin Trivedi as Guruji
- Sonia Singh
- Namrata Thapa
- Prabhat Bhattacharya
- Harish Shetty

5. Kalpanik (Episode 99 to Episode 111)

- Amita Chandekar as Reva
- Ishita Sharma as Deepti: A ghost
- Karanvir Bohra / Amit Sadh as Rohan: Reva's friend
- Jayati Bhatia as Malati: Reva and Rashmi's mother
- Chetan Pandit as Lalit: Reva and Rashmi's father
- Aparna Jaywant as Rashmi: Reva's younger sister
- Rio Kapadia as Kishore
- Nayan Bhatt as Shobhna
- Tuhina Vohra as Ritu: Shobhna's younger sister
- Pratichi Mishra as Reva's paternal aunt
- Madhuri Bhatia as Sheela
- Vishal Sablani as Atish: Kishore and Shobhna's younger son
- Murli Sharma as Inspector
- Gajendra Chauhan as Pandit Ji
- Prakash Ramchandani

6. Kayamath (Episode 112 to Episode 130)

- Hiten Tejwani as Natesh:A devil
- Mayuri Kango as Sakshi: Natesh's wife
- Prabhat Bhattacharya as Saket: Natesh's fake elder brother
- Urvashi Dholakia as Mohini/ Mahachandalika:Saket's fake wife
- Kali Prasad Mukherjee as Netri
- Shama Deshpande as Natesh and Saket's fake mother
- Kamalika Guha Thakurta as Shalaka
- Kusumit Sana as Natesh and Saket's fake younger sister

7.Karzz (Episode 131 to Episode 141)

- Kiran Dubey as Nishita Nakul Kapoor, reincarnated version of Charulata
- Rohit Roy as Nakul Kapoor, reincarnated version of Thakur Rajveer
- Ashlesha Sawant as Sonia Amar Mehra, reincarnated version of Vaishnavi
- Alihassan Turabi as Amar Mehra
- Deepraj Rana as Rajvansh
- Sai Ballal as Mr. Kapoor: Nakul's father

8. Kabzaa (Episode 142 to Episode 159)

- Narayani Shastri / Shweta Tiwari as Aashna "Ashu"
- Sandeep Baswana as Preet: Aashna's husband"
- Jaya Bhattacharya as Anita and Preet's mother
- Shabbir Ahluwalia as Jay: Aashna's college friend and obsessive lover
- Rohit Bakshi as Bobby: Aashna's college friend
- Sonia Singh as Neha: Aashna's college friend
- Kaliprasad Mukherjee as Netri
- Amit Singh Thakur as Anita and Preet's father
- Sikandar Kharbanda as Nakul: Aashna's elder brother
- Rinku Dhawan as Anita: Preet's elder sister
- Namrata Thapa as Nakul and Aashna's younger sister
- Madhavi Gogate as Nakul and Aashna's mother
- Preeti Puri as Kavita Hassanandani
- Malini Kapoor as Monica Hasssanandani

9. Khaall (Episode 160 to Episode 176)

- Sumeet Sachdev as Rajeev Khandelwal
- Achint Kaur / Urvashi Dholakia as Niharika Oberoi / Niharika Rajeev Khandelwal
- Geetanjali Tikekar as Natasha: Rajeev's ex-girlfriend
- Sandeep Rajora as Ali: Rajeev's friend
- Vishal Puri as Karan: Natasha's elder brother
- Kishori Shahane as Karan and Natasha's mother
- G.P. Kapoor as Mr. Oberoi: Niharika's father
- Madhumalti Kapoor as Rajeev's grandmother

10. Kab Kyon Kahan (Episode 177 - episode 190)

- Hiten Tejwani as Pratham
- Gauri Pradhan in a dual role as Mayuri, Pratham's girlfriend, and as Gauri, Mayuri's lookalike twin sister
- Cezanne Khan as Kunwar Sujit Singh: a vampire
- Manasi Varma as Jessica: Pratham's friend
- Nikhil Guharoy as Yash: Pratham's friend
- Ali Asgar as Professor Samuel

11. Kohra (Episode 191 - episode 206)

- Shabbir Ahluwalia as Kushal Jay
- Shweta Tiwari as Sunita Menon
- Siddharth Choudhary as Vikram: As Sunita's husband (Ghost)
- Poonam Joshi as Piya: Sunita's best friend (later revealed to be her own younger sister)
- Kali Prasad Mukherjee as Inspector Mohan
- Vineeta Malik
- Sejal Shah
- Shravani Goswami
- Sal Balal as Guru Ji (Sunita, Piya and Radhika's father)

12. Kutumb (Episode 207 - episode 225)

- Mayuri Kango as Shilpa Uday Khanna
- Tarun Khanna as Uday Khanna
- Madhumalti Kapoor as Buaji
- Pracheen Chauhan
- Rasika Joshi
- Parmeet Sethi
- Sonal Pendse
- Tejal Shah

13. Kab Kaisey Kahan (Episode 226 - episode 252)

- Chetan Hansraj as Moksh Chauhan
- Shilpa Saklani as Tanu/ Rachel D'Mello: Indira's reincarnation
- Jasveer Kaur as Indira: Moksh's girlfriend
- Kishwer Merchant as Nikki: Moksh Chauhan
- Sachin Sharma as Purab: Tanu's best friend/fake husband
- Prabhat Bhattacharya as Shubho: Purab's father
- Urvashi Dholakia as Gayatri: Purab's elder paternal aunt
- Monalika Bhonsle as Deepika: Purab's younger paternal aunt
- Mukul Dev as Himanshu: Nikki's cousin
- Roopa Divetia as Tanu's maternal aunt
- Suchita Trivedi as a tarot card reader
- Prakash Ramchandani as Deepika's husband

== See also ==
- List of Hindi thriller shows
