= Kunal Verma =

Indian actor

- Occupation: Actor
- Years active: 2008–present
- Known for: Tujh Sang Preet Lagai Sajna; Havan; Devon Ke Dev...Mahadev; Dream Girl – Ek Ladki Deewani Si
- Spouse: Puja Banerjee (m. 2020)
- Children: 2

Kunal Verma is an Indian actor who primarily works in Hindi television. Verma is best known for his portrayal of Yugandhar in Tujh Sang Preet Lagai Sajna, which marked his acting debut. He has also portrayed Atharva in Havan, Lakshmana in Devon Ke Dev...Mahadev and Karan Roy in Dream Girl – Ek Ladki Deewani Si.

== Personal life ==
Verma married his Tujh Sang Preet Lagai Sajna co-star Puja Banerjee in April 2020. Verma and Banerjee are parents to a son and a daughter.

== Filmography ==
=== Films ===
Year	Title	Role	Notes	Ref.
2015	End Topic	Khan	Short film	
2016	Unlimited Tamaashaa	Pyare		
2021	Bob Biswas	Rahul		

=== Television ===
Year	Title	Role	Notes	Ref.
2008–2010	Tujh Sang Preet Lagai Sajna	Yugandhar "Yug"		
2010–2011	Tera Mujhse Hai Pehle Ka Naata Koi	Rohan		
2011	Havan	Atharva		
2011	Surya – The Super Cop	Veer		
2013	C.I.D.	Arnav		
2013-2014	Devon Ke Dev...Mahadev	Lakshmana		
2014	Ek Mutthi Aasmaan	Aryan		
2015–2016	Dream Girl – Ek Ladki Deewani Si	Karan Roy		
2017	Dil Se Dil Tak	Aman Patel		
2025	Jhanak	Dr. Vihaan Parekh		

=== Web series ===
Year	Title	Role	Notes	Ref.
2020	The Bull of Dalal Street	Kunal		
2023	Dear Ishq	Rizwan Khan		
2026	Hasratein 3	Suleiman		

=== Music videos ===
Year	Title	Singer(s)	Ref.
2020	Waise Toh Teri Yaad	Swarat Chakraborty	
