= Rima Ramanuj =

India actress

- Born: Bhavnagar, Gujarat, India
- Education: Dental Degree
- Alma mater: Pacific University (India)
- Occupation: Actress
- Years active: 2015–present

Rima Ramanuj is an Indian television actress, She debuted as an actress in the Sony TV's television series Yeh Moh Moh Ke Dhaagey who plays Eijaz Khan's sister aka Mishri on the show. She also acted in the promotional Pepsi ad.

== Career ==
Ramanuj attended Fatima Convent School, Bhavnagar. She used to score well in her academics, which is how she completed her dentistry.

She came to Mumbai, completed training in dentistry and took up a job. Later, whenever she got audition calls, she used to carry her clothes. She used to go to work, and if got a call, she used to change according to the audition in a mall nearby and then attend the audition.

She did a ramp walk at Phoenix Marketcity (Pune) to raise fund for BETI.

== Television ==
| Year | Show | Role | Channel |
|---|---|---|---|
| 2017 | Yeh Moh Moh Ke Dhaagey | Mishri | Sony TV |
