= Nidhi Uttam =

Indian television and film actress

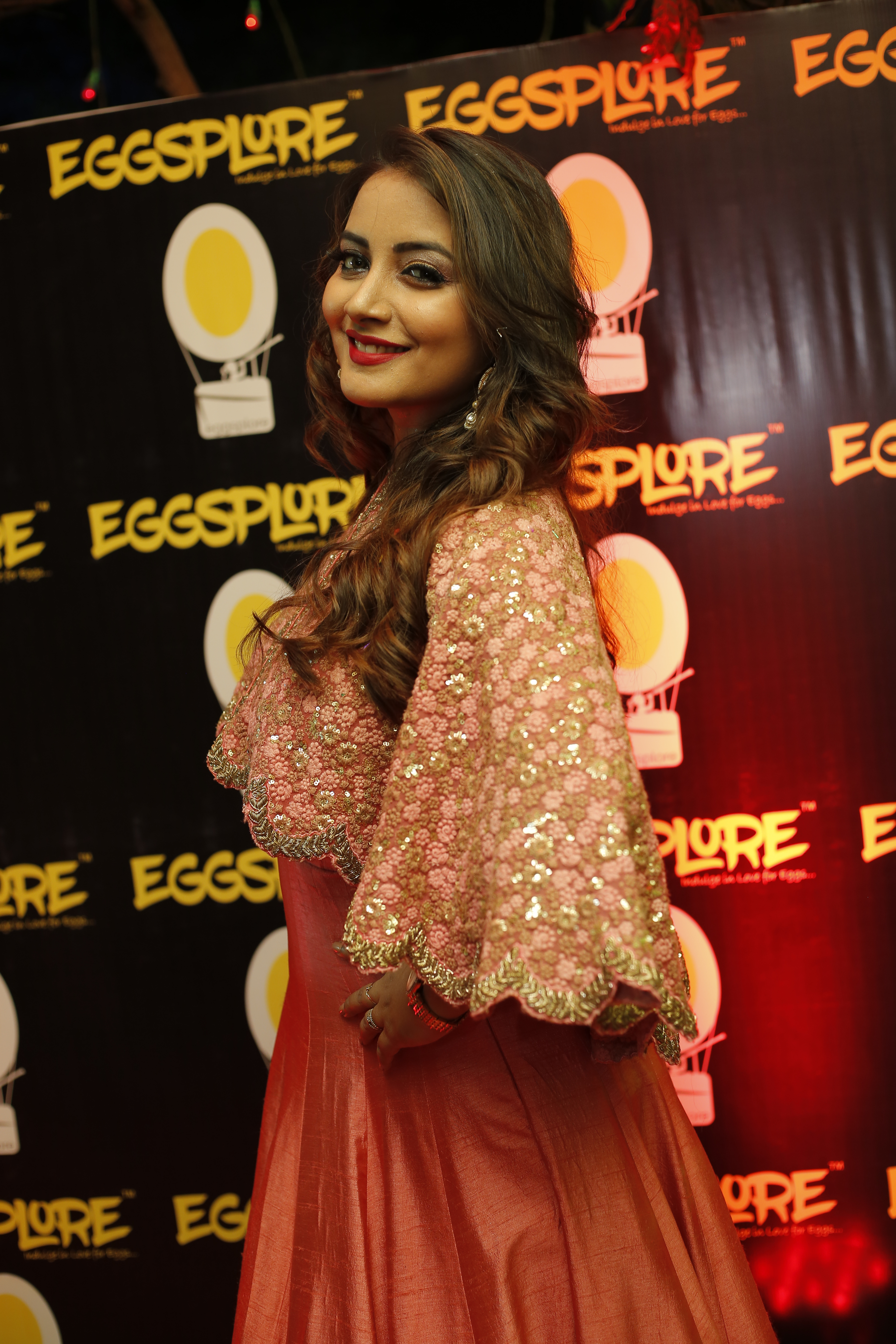
- Uttam at an inauguration in 2018
- Born: Kanpur, Uttar Pradesh, India
- Education: St. Mary's Convent High School, Kanpur
- Occupations: Actress; model; influencer
- Years active: 2006–present
- Known for: Yeh Rishta Kya Kehlata Hai
- Spouse: Mohit Pathak

Nidhi Uttam Pathak is an Indian television and film actress known for portraying Nandini Singhania Chauhan in Star Plus's longest-running Indian soap, Yeh Rishta Kya Kehlata Hai. She has also acted in Kasautii Zindagii Kay, Ek Boond Ishq, Dil Boley Oberoi and Aghori. In 2020, she made her film debut with Anubhav Sinha's social film, Thappad. In 2023 Nidhi appeared as main lead in movie Chaar Lugai

== Early and personal life ==
Born in Kanpur, Uttar Pradesh, India, Uttam did schooling from St. Mary's Convent High School, Kanpur. She has an identical twin, Nishi.

She moved to Mumbai to study Graphic Design and Animation.

Uttam married her childhood friend, singer and lyricist, Mohit Pathak, in Lucknow. The wedding was attended by her fellow co-stars from Yeh Rishta Kya Kehlata Hai.

== Career ==
=== Television career ===
After playing an uncredited small role in Zee TV's Maayka in 2006, Uttam was set to star as the title character in Star Plus's Kasturi and make her debut in a leading character, but later Shubhangi Atre replaced her.

She finally debuted with Ekta Kapoor's popular soap, Kasautii Zindagii Kay for Star Plus as Tara in 2008.

In the same year, she played Sukanya in Doli Saja Ke.

In 2009, Uttam was cast in Star Plus's longest-running Indian daily soap, Yeh Rishta Kya Kehlata Hai as Nandini Singhania which she eventually quit in 2016.

Along with her role of Nandini, she portrayed Meethi in Life OK's Ek Boond Ishq in 2013.

In 2017, she appeared in a special appearance for Gul Khan's Dil Boley Oberoi on Star Plus as Jhanvi.

Next, Uttam was seen in Zee TV's Ek Tha Raja Ek Thi Rani, where she enacted the role of Sakshi.

In 2018, she returned to Yeh Rishta Kya Kehlata Hai, but finally confirmed her exit from it in 2019.

The following year, she appeared in the television series Aghori via Zee TV, portraying Priya.

=== Film career ===
Nidhi ventured into films with Suniel Shetty starrer Nanha Einstein in 2017.

She appeared in Anubhav Sinha's drama, Thappad, starring Taapsee Pannu as a caring housewife who wants justice against domestic violence, when her husband slaps her unreasonably. Thappad was moderately profitable at the box office earning ₹440 million (US$4.6 million) against its ₹250 million (US$2.6 million).

== Television shows ==
Year	Title	Role	Ref.
2006	Maayka		
2008	Kasautii Zindagii Kay	Tara Bajaj	
2008	Doli Saja Ke	Sukanya	
2009–2016, 2018–2019	Yeh Rishta Kya Kehlata Hai	Nandini Singhania Chauhan	
2013	Ek Boond Ishq	Meethi	
2017	Dil Boley Oberoi	Jhanvi	
2017	Ek Tha Raja Ek Thi Rani	Sakshi	
2019	Aghori	Priya	
2022	Doosri Maa	Mala	

== Films ==
Year	Film	Role	Ref.
2014	Arnab aur Jadui Locket		
2017	Nanhe Einstein	School principal	
2020	Thappad	Kavita	
2023	Chaar Lugai	Usha	
