= Lavanya (TV series) =

- A promotional logo image for Lavanya.
- Created by: Dream Team Software & Moving Pictures Company
- Written by: Habib Faisal & Nilendu Sen
- Starring: see below
- Opening theme: "Lavanya" by Vinod Rathod
- Country of origin: India
- No. of seasons: 1
- No. of episodes: 99

Production
- Executive producer: Sikandar Rana
- Producers: Uma Gajapati Raju & Ramesh Sharma
- Running time: 22 minutes

Original release
- Network: Zee TV
- Release: 28 March – 14 July 2004

Lavanya is an Indian television series which premiered on 28 March 2004 on Zee TV. and ended in 14 July 2004

== Plot ==
The story is based on the life of a rich young woman name Lavanya who is residing in Belampally with her parents. Being the only daughter, she is a little spoiled, and her parents let her do whatever she wants. Lavanya is secretly in love with a middle-class guy, who doesn't propose because he is not as rich as her. Her parents want her to get marry to a rich guy so, to see her secret friend Sandy, Lavanya lies to her parents. Lavanya has two best friends, Shekhar and Nikhil. Shekhar, who also belongs to a middle-class family, works for Lavanya's father. Knowing that Shekhar and Lavanya are good friends, Shekhar's mother wants him to marry her; however, Lavanya's parents want her to marry Nikhil because he is from a rich family. But being in love with Sandy, Lavanya tells her parents that if she is going to marry it will only be Sandy. Hearing that her parents get annoyed, but they agree to meet him. They tell Lavanya that she can only get marry to Sandy if they like him; otherwise she will have to marry Nikhil. Lavanya gets excited because she knows that her parents will approve of him. Unfortunately Sandy doesn't show up. Knowing that she will be forced to marry Nikhil now, Lavanya than decides to run away.

When Lavanya goes to the station to meet Sandy, he does not show up. She learns that her father is in the hospital. Lavanya, thinking Sandy betrayed her, goes to the hospital and agrees to marry Nikhil. She does so because of her father's health. Later she learns that Sandy died while coming to the station. After facing this major tragedy, on the day of her marriage with Nikhil, Lavanya's dad suffers from a heart attack and dies. Nikhil goes back to Mumbai for his job. Lavanya who is still in love with Sandy stays with to support her mother. When Lavanya goes to Nikhil, she makes it very clear to him on the first day that she never loved him and wants a divorce. Nikhil, who loves Lavanya, agrees and talks to a lawyer. However, the judge tells them that they have to be married for six months to get the divorce.

Lavanya calls her mother in Delhi and tells her she will divorce. Heartbroken Nikhil is afraid to tell his mom: He lies to Lavanya that his mother is suffering from a heart problem and she cannot take any kind of shock. Lavanya then pretends to be in love with Nikhil in front of her mother-in-law. On the other hand, to take revenge from Lavanya's family for not allowing their daughter's marriage with Shekhar, his mother sends Lavanya's photos with Sandy to Nikhil's mother, who gets a major shock after seeing them. Nikhil makes an excuse that they are pictures from a school play. Lavanya thinks that Shekhar sent the photos and is filled with hatred for him. Shekhar who comes to Mumbai for a business deal goes to Lavanya's house where he is literally kicked out. Nikhil also believes that Shekhar is responsible for those pictures and hates him. But when his misunderstanding his cleared and he realizes that Shekhar's mother sent the pictures, he invites Shekhar home.

Lavanya also apologizes. Lavanya, Shekhar, Tanya (Nikhil's sister who is a journalist) and Nikhil all live in one apartment now. While trying to get Lavanya closer to Nikhil, Tanya falls in love with Shekhar.

Anny, Nikhil's classmate from the US, comes to Mumbai. She loves Nikhil and dreams of marrying him. Lavanya gets jealous seeing Nikhil and Anny together. When Anny realizes that Lavanya loves Nikhil, she leaves. Lavanya and Nikhil love each other but are afraid to express their feelings. Nikhil convinces Lavanya to have a painting exhibition so that he can spend some time with her and get her to express her feelings.

During a press conference when asked who was Lavanya's inspiration, instead of saying Nikhil she says Sandy. Nikhil is very upset. Sandy is shown to be alive watching the press conference on TV. Will Lavanya choose Nikhil over Sandy?

== Cast ==
- Shilpa Saklani as Lavanya
- Rohit Bakshi as Nikhil
- Ashish Kapoor as Shekhar
- Gaurav Chopra as Sandy
- Himanshi Choudhry as Tanya
- Parineeta Borthakur as Gauri
