= Pati Patni Aur Woh (TV series) =

- Starring: Gurmeet Choudhary; Debina Bonnerjee; Rakhi Sawant; Elesh Parujanwala; Juhi Parmar; Sachin Shroff; Mouni Roy; Gaurav Chopra; Apoorva Agnihotri; Shilpa Saklani
- Country of origin: India
- Original language: Hindi

Production
- Running time: 20 minutes per episode

Original release
- Network: NDTV Imagine
- Release: 28 September – 4 December 2009

Pati Patni Aur Woh is an Indian reality television programme. It is the Indian version of The Baby Borrowers. On the programme 5 celebrity couples were tested in parenting.

The contestants were Rakhi Sawant and Elesh Parujanwala, Apoorva and Shilpa Agnihotri, Gaurav Chopra and Mouni Roy, Gurmeet Choudhary and Debina Bonnerjee along with Sachin Shroff and Juhi Parmar.

== Participants ==
- Elesh Parujanwala and Rakhi Sawant
- Gurmeet Choudhary and Debina Bonnerjee
- Sachin Shroff and Juhi Parmar
- Apurva Agnihotri and Shilpa Saklani
- Gaurav Chopra and Mouni Roy
