= Mohit Pathak =

Indian singer and lyricist (born 1984)

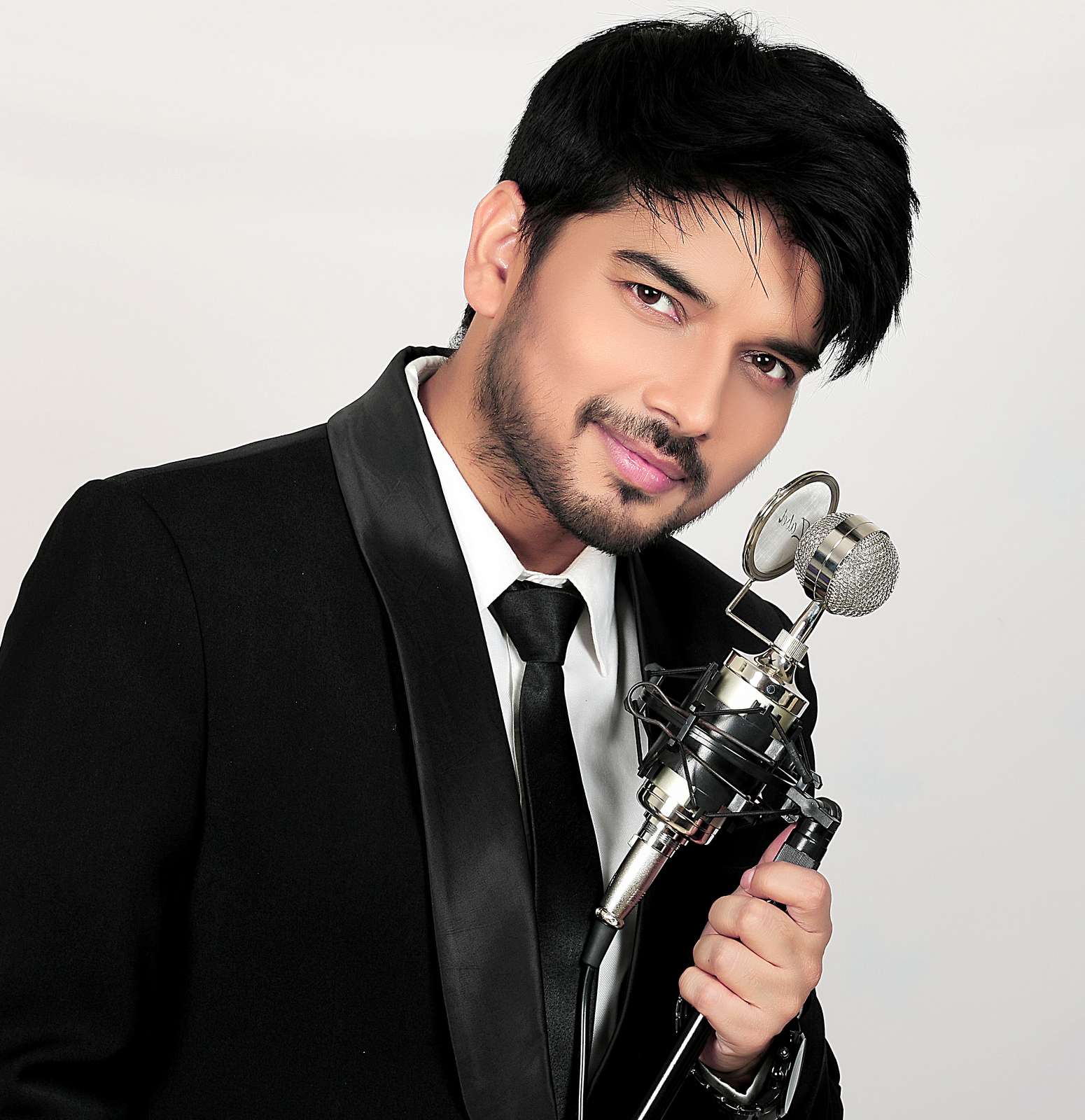
- Pathak in 2019
- Education: Mahanagar Boys Inter College
- Occupations: Singer, music director, lyricist
- Years active: 2007–present
- Known for: Haryana (film) (2022) Wishlist (2020) Paharganj (2019) Hai Apna Dil Toh Awara (2016) Aur Pyar Ho Gaya (Tv series)
- Spouse: Nidhi Uttam
- Website: mohitpathak.in

Mohit Pathak (born 1984) is an Indian music director, singer, and lyricist in the Hindi film & television industry. He rose to fame becoming part of a singing reality show The Voice.

== Personal life ==
Pathak was born and raised in Lucknow. He went for school to Mahanagar Boys Inter College and is a graduate from University of Lucknow. He later moved to Mumbai in 2006 to pursue music. Pathak is married to his childhood friend and Indian television/film actress Nidhi Uttam. The couple were National Institute of Fashion Technology aspirants. The wedding took place in Lucknow and was attended by their fellow artists and friends from the TV industry.

== Career ==
=== Television ===
Mohit started off his career as a singer in 2006 by lending his vocals to title and theme songs for Hindi television shows like Pari Hoon Main and Yeh Ishq Haaye. These songs were duets with Shruti Pathak and Alisha Chinai respectively. He debuted as a music director and lyricist in 2014 with his songs for Zee TV's Aur Pyaar Ho Gaya for which Pathak holds a double nomination at the Indian Television Academy Awards 2014 as best singer and best lyricist. Later in the same year he did another show for producer Rajan Shahi on Sony Television called Itti si Khushi. In 2015 he gave music for a ten-episode special show by Essel Vision Productions on Zee TV called Rishton Ka Mela. During mid 2015 Pathak entered the very first season of &TV's singing reality show The Voice India. He was chosen to be a part of Team Shaan by coach Shaan. He also wrote and sung Sony Mix's anthem "Jab Dhun Baje".

=== Films ===
In 2014 itself Pathak wrote and sung songs for an Asian movie The System. 2016 saw his next release as a songwriter where singers Mohit Chauhan and Papon sang two of Pathak's songs for the movie Hai Apna Dil Toh Awara. Pathak composed and scored for the short film Ridicoolas for international film festivals in 2017. Pathak also sang and wrote songs for the Gujrati film Tamburo in 2017. His recent release in April 2019 as a singer songwriter was Paharganj (2019) starring Lorena Franco. Sandeep Baswana's Haryana (film) marked Mohit's debut as a solo music director and original background scorer.

=== Music Albums/EPs/Singles ===
Pathak's first album as a songwriter was released in September 2013 by Sony Music India and was titled In Rahon Mein. Music was given by Ajay Singha. His next release was Faryaadein a single by Indian Idol 4 winner Sourabhee Debbarma for Zee Music Company. He sang and composed the single "Eppatikki Prema" in Telugu duet with Shashaa Tirupati released on Lahari Music. Amongst other hits penned by him were two songs from the album Lafz unkahe (2017) sung by Jonita Gandhi and Shashaa Tirupati. In 2018 Venus Music released Pathak's first single as music director and lyricist called "Ik Vaari". His recent releases in 2019 are with T-Series named "Don't need ya love" and Venus Music's "Rang Do" for which Pathak has given the music and written lyrics. Zee Music Company also came out with two of their recent single releases written by Pathak featuring Sara Khan and Ankit Gera called "Jaaniya" and "Far Away". Also between 2018 and 2019 he released two independent originals "Humsa Yaar" and "Tere Sheher Mein" composed and performed by him.
