= Geetanjali Tikekar =

Indian television actress

- Occupation: Actress
- Years active: 2002–2022
- Known for: Kasautii Zindagii Kay; Iss Pyaar Ko Kya Naam Doon? Ek Baar Phir; Shubh Laabh – Aapkey Ghar Mein
- Spouse: Sikandar Kharbanda (m. 2007)

Geetanjali Tikekar is an Indian television actress known for portraying the role of Aparna in Kasautii Zindagii Kay and Anjali Niranjan Agnihotri in Iss Pyaar Ko Kya Naam Doon? Ek Baar Phir.

== Career ==
Geetanjali started her television career with Kya Hadsaa Kya Haqeeqat in 2002. She played the role of a psychotherapist in Jersey No. 10 on Sony SAB. In Tere Liye she played Neelanjana Shekhar Ganguly on Star Plus. She gained popularity for her role of Aparna Anurag Basu in Kasautii Zindagii Kay, for which she also won accolades. She also portrayed Anjali Niranjan Agnihotri in Iss Pyaar Ko Kya Naam Doon? Ek Baar Phir on Star Plus.

== Personal life ==
She married her co-star Sikandar Kharbanda from Kasautii Zindagii Kay. They dated each other 2 and a half years before marriage. The couple have a son named Shaurya Kharbanda born on 1 December 2008.

== Television ==
| Year | Show | Role | Notes | Ref(s) |
|---|---|---|---|---|
| 2002–2003 | Kya Hadsaa Kya Haqeeqat | Neonika "Nikki" Chatterjee / Neonika Raj Karmarkar | (Episode 6 to Episode 29) | |
| 2002–2003 | Kya Hadsaa Kya Haqeeqat | Natasha | (Episode 160 to Episode 176) | |
| 2002–2003 | Kahi To Milenge | Sanjana | | |
| 2003–2004; 2005–2007 | Kasautii Zindagii Kay | Aparna Ghosh / Aparna Anurag Basu / Suchitra | | |
| 2004–2005 | Hum 2 Hain Na | Anjali | | |
| 2005 | Raat Hone Ko Hai | Sanjana | (Episode 229 to Episode 232) | |
| 2006–2008 | Karam Apnaa Apnaa | Maya Kapoor | | |
| 2007–2008 | Jersey No. 10 | Psychotherapist | | |
| 2010–2011 | Tere Liye | Neelanjana Shekhar Ganguly | | |
| 2011 | Adaalat – Zindagi Milegi Dobara : Part 1 & Part 2 | Advocate Suchitra Silwadker | (Episode 69 & Episode 70) | |
| 2013–2015 | Iss Pyaar Ko Kya Naam Doon? Ek Baar Phir | Anjali Niranjan Agnihotri | | |
| 2016 | Ek Duje Ke Vaaste | Nirmala Ramnath Malhotra | | |
| 2019–2020 | Naagin 4: Bhagya Ka Zehreela Khel | Vrushali Akash Parikh | | |
| 2021 | Kyun Utthe Dil Chhod Aaye | Nalini Gajendra Pratapsingh / Nalini Vijendra Pratapsingh | | |
| 2021–2022 | Shubh Laabh – Aapkey Ghar Mein | Savita Niranjan Toshniwal | | |

== Awards ==
| Year | Award | Category | Character | Show | Result |
|---|---|---|---|---|---|
| 2004 | Indian Television Academy Awards | Best Actress in a Negative Role | Aparna Basu | Kasautii Zindagii Kay | Won |
| 2004 | Indian Telly Awards | Best Actress in a Supporting Role | Aparna Basu | Kasautii Zindagii Kay | Won |
