= Sikandar Kharbanda =

Indian television actor

- Born: Sahil Kharbanda; 30 January 1979 (age 47); Delhi, India
- Other names: Sikky, Sahil, Indroneil, Indro, Joker
- Occupation: Actor
- Known for: Comic roles, Bhojpuri movies
- Spouse: Geetanjali Tikekar (m. 2007)
- Relatives: Shakti Kapoor (maternal uncle), Shraddha Kapoor (first cousin), Siddhanth Kapoor (first cousin)

Sikandar Kharbanda (born Sahil Kharbanda; 30 January 1979) is an Indian actor. He works mainly in Hindi television and Bhojpuri films.

== Career ==
Sikandar made his debut on TV with Kahani Ghar Ghar Ki, playing the role of Yash Garg. He played the role of Indraneil in Kasauti Zindagi Kay in a comic role along Urvashi Dholakia, who played the famous role of Komolika.

He made a guest appearance in Kahani Teri Meri, Karam Apna Apna and Aa Gale Lag Jaa. Later, he appeared in Tumhari Disha as Taj. His next role was as Vikram in Kahin Kissi Roz.

== Personal life ==
Born as Sahil, he completed his schooling from Mount Saint Mary's School in 1994. He did his Bachelor of Arts from Venkateshwara College, University of Delhi. He took his maternal grandfather, Sikander Lal Kapoor's first name as his screen name. His maternal grandfather was a tailor while his maternal grandmother, Susheela Kapoor, was a housewife. He has three maternal uncles, Shakti, Parvin and Rummy Kapoor. His mother Renu Kapoor Kharbanda is a housewife. His uncle is actor Shakti Kapoor.

Kharbanda married his Kasauti Zindagi Kay co-star Geetanjali Tikekar. The two have a son named Shaurya.

== Television ==
Year	Serial	Role	Notes
2001	Ssshhhh...Koi Hai	Jeet	Woh koun thi-Episode 14
2001	Kahaani Ghar Ghar Kii	Yash Garg	
2002–2008	Kasautii Zindagii Kay	Indraneel "Indra" Sengupta	
2002	Aa Gale Lag Jaa	a ghost	
2002	Kaahin Kissii Roz	Vikram	
2003	Kahani Terrii Merrii	unnamed	
2008	Pari Hoon Main	Balma	
2009	Karam Apnaa Apnaa	a soul	
2009	Hindi Hain Hum		
2010	Do Hanso Ka Joda	Chachaji	
2011	Apno Ke Liye Geeta Ka Dharmayudh	Basant	
2011	Phulwa	Kulbhushan	
2012	Madhubala - Ek Ishq Ek Junoon	Sikandar Bhatia (Sikky)	
2012	Phir Subah Hogi	Kataria	
2012	Savdhaan India		1 episode
2016	Box Cricket League 2	Himself	Team Member of Pune Anmol Ratan
2016	Amma	IPS Atul Sahay	
2016	Adaalat	Public Prosecutor	
2018	Belan Wali Bahu	Jeetendra Awasthi	
2019	Nazar	Rudra Pratap	
2019	Vikram Betaal Ki Rahasya Gatha	Kameshwar	
2019	Naagin 4	Madhav Parekh	
2020	Guddan Tumse Na Ho Payega	Avinash Jindal	
2020	Shakti – Astitva Ke Ehsaas Ki	Mr. Shergill	
2021	Saath Nibhaana Saathiya 2	Professor Kumar	
2022–2023	Bindiya Sarkar	Harishankar Bharadwaj	
2023	Ishq Ki Dastaan - Naagmani	Ujjwal	
2023–present	Yeh Rishta Kya Kehlata Hai	Advocate Manoj "Mannu" Poddar	

=== Films ===
Year	Film	Role	Language	Notes
2001	Naag Yoni		Hindi	
2001	Style	Dinesh Jhari	Hindi	
2002	Bad Boys	Rahul	Hindi	
2002	Maine Dil Tujhko Diya	Leader of Team Warriors	Hindi	
2003	Kucch To Hai	Yash's friend	Hindi	
2004	Taarzan: The Wonder Car	Rocky	Hindi	
2006	Jigyaasa	PA of the lead actor	Hindi	
2006	Aatma		Hindi	
2006	The Real Dream Girls	Guest Appearance	Hindi	
2007	Aur Pappu Pass Ho Gaya	Pappu's friend	Hindi	
2009	Meri Life Mein Uski Wife	Rahul	Hindi	
	Paandav	Arjun Thakur	Bhojpuri	
	Ram Balram	Balram	Bhojpuri	
	Jogi Jee Dheere Dheere		Bhojpuri	
	Aapan Mati Aapan Desh		Bhojpuri	
2012	Gabbar Singh		Bhojpuri	Balaji Telefilms
	Rampur Ka Laxman	Inspector	Bhojpuri	
	Pandit Ji Batain Na Biyah Kab Hoyee		Bhojpuri	
	Ghayal Sher		Bhojpuri	
	Ghar Aaja Pardesi		Bhojpuri	
	Bambai Ki Laila Chapra Ke Chaila		Bhojpuri	
	Chhotki Dulhin	Raja	Bhojpuri	
	Hum Balbrahma Chaari Tu Kanya Kumari		Bhojpuri	

==== Bhojpuri TV series ====
- Badka Sahab
