= Apurva Agnihotri =

Indian television actor

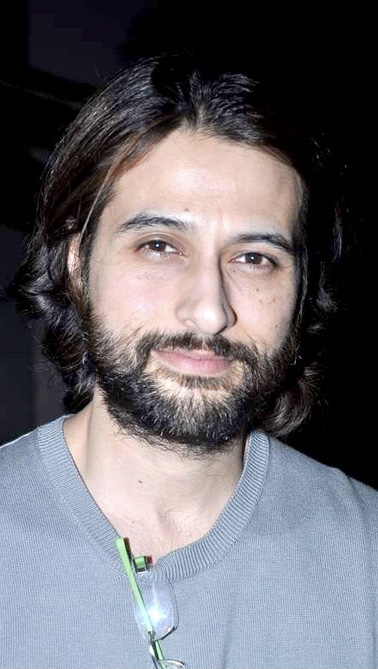
- Agnihotri in 2013
- Born: 2 December 1972 (age 53); Kanpur, Uttar Pradesh, India
- Occupations: Model; actor
- Years active: 1997–present
- Spouse: Shilpa Saklani (m. 2004)
- Children: 1

Apurva Agnihotri is an Indian actor and model who has appeared in both Bollywood films and Indian television serials. His debut film role was in the 1997 hit Pardes. He later starred in Jassi Jaissi Koi Nahin.

== Personal life ==
In 2004, he married television actress Shilpa Saklani. The couple have a daughter.

== Career ==
Agnihotri debuted in the film Pardes, co-starring with Shahrukh Khan and directed by Subhash Ghai. The film was highly successful and garnered Agnihotri the nomination for Best Supporting Actor in Zee Cine Awards.

After several more film roles, he was offered the lead role in Jassi Jaissi Koi Nahin, an Indian television serial. His work as Armaan Suri won him the Indian Telly Awards Best Actor Award for 2005.

He participated in Colors TV's Bigg Boss 7 on 15 September 2013 with his wife Shilpa Saklani. He went on to play roles in shows like Pyaar Ka Dard Hai Meetha Meetha Pyaara Pyaara, Ajeeb Dastaan Hai Yeh and SauBhagyalaxmi. In 2018, he joined Bepannah as Rajveer Khanna.

He then portrayed Harry Somani in ALT Balaji's Kehne Ko Humsafar Hain for three seasons. From December 2025 to November 2026, he played Dr. Fareed Quadri in Colors TV's Seher - Hone Ko Hai.

== Filmography ==
=== Films ===
Year	Title	Role	Notes
1997	Pardes	Rajiv Lal	
1999	Pyaar Koi Khel Nahin	Ashok/Sunil	
2000	Krodh	Raj Verma	
2001	Hum Ho Gaye Aapke	Mohan Sachdev	
2001	Kasoor	Amit	
2002	Pyaar Diwana Hota Hai	Vikram	
2003	Dhund	Kunal	
2004	Lakeer	Ronny Dsouza	

=== Television ===
Year	Serial	Role	Notes
2003–2006	Jassi Jaissi Koi Nahin	Armaan Suri	
2005	Nach Baliye 1	Contestant	6th place
2006–2007	Kaajjal	Dev Pratapsingh	
2008–2009	Radhaa Ki Betiyaan Kuch Kar Dikhayengi	Dr. Shekhar Kapoor	
2009	Pati Patni Aur Woh	Contestant	
2010	Sapna Babul Ka...Bidaai	Anmol Rajvansh	
2012	Aasman Se Aage	Dev Chopra	
2012	Ek Hazaaron Mein Meri Behna Hai	Himself	Guest
2013	Bigg Boss 7	Contestant	13th place
2014	Pyaar Ka Dard Hai Meetha Meetha Pyaara Pyaara	Vikram Dhanrajgir	
2014–2015	Ajeeb Dastaan Hai Yeh	Vikram Ahuja	
2015	Power Couple	Contestant	7th place
2016	SauBhagyalaxmi	Samarth Ranawat	
2017–2018	Meri Durga	Coach Bhagat	
2018	Bepannaah	Rajveer Khanna	
2021	Anupamaa	Dr. Adavait Khanna	
2025–2026	Seher – Hone Ko Hai	Dr. Fareed Quadri	

=== Web series ===
Year	Title	Role	Notes
2018–2020	Kehne Ko Humsafar Hain	Harry Somani	

== Awards and nominations ==
Year	Award	Category	Work	Notes
1998	Screen Awards	Most Promising Newcomer – Male	Pardes	Nominated
2005	Indian Telly Awards	Best Actor (Male)	Jassi Jaissi Koi Nahin	Won
