= The System (2014 film) =

- Theatrical release poster
- Directed by: Shahzad Ghufoor
- Written by: Wajid Zubairi
- Produced by: Ghafoor Butt
- Starring: Sheraz; Kashaf Ali
- Cinematography: Syed Faisal Bukhari; Jennifer Lucien
- Edited by: Ahtisham Ali
- Music by: Shailesh Suvarna
- Production company: Leos Productions
- Distributed by: Prime Film International; Green Chili Entertainment
- Release date: 30 May 2014
- Country: Pakistan
- Language: Urdu
- Box office: Rs. 4.06 crore (US$150,000)

The System is a 2014 Pakistani action and drama film directed by Shahzad Ghufoor and produced by Ghafoor Butt of Leo Productions Pakistan. It stars Nadeem Baig, Shafqat Cheema, Irfan Khoosat and Nayyar Ejaz in the lead roles.

== Plot ==
The film is set in a neighbourhood in Lahore and telescopes out from the everyday lives of a middle-class family to expose local corruption.

The story centres on Haider Ali, a working-class boy and the son of a prayer leader. He is in love with a local girl named Sara. Haider's uncle is a government official who believes that accepting bribes is not sinful. Haider is framed by the local SHO for a mob shooting. After managing to escape punishment for this crime, Haider's life changes drastically. He now sees the bigger, more bitter picture of the current system and its effect on everyone. He decides to do something about it, putting his education, family, friends, and love at risk in the process.

== Cast ==
- Sheraz Ghufoor as Haider Ali
- Kashaf Ali - Sara
- Nadeem Baig - Pesh Imam (Haider's father)
- Irfan Khoosat - Haider's uncle
- Shafqat Cheema - corrupt SHO
- Nayyar Ejaz - corrupt minister
- Mariyam Ali Hussiain - dancer
- Ejaz Hussain Bugti
- Rabia Tabassum
- Sufian Bhatti
- Saleem Shah
- Saima Saleem
- Saira

== Music ==
Four songs on the soundtrack were produced in India. The music director was Shailesh Suvarna, with poetry from Bollywood's lyricist Irfan Siddiqui and Mohit Pathak. The tracks included several leading singers such as Javed Ali, Komal Rizvi, Palak Muchhal, Mohit Pathak and Krishna Beura. Two of the film's song videos were shot in Norway.

The System
No.	Title	Singer(s)	Length
1.	"Lutt geya"	Krishna Beura	5:05
2.	"Naughty Saiyyan"	Supriya Ramalingam and Mohit Pathak	3:51
3.	"Sayyon Re"	Palak Muchhal and Mohit Pathak	4:38
4.	"Aa Re Aa"	Javed Ali and Komal Rizvi	4:08

== Release ==
The film was premiered on 29 May 2014 in, Lahore and released countrywide on 59 screens on 30 May. The film was also released in Norway on 13 June.

== See also ==
- List of highest-grossing Pakistani films
- List of Pakistani films of 2014

== Reviews ==
- "The System: Clichéd but needed". The Express Tribune. Sher Khan. 1 June 2014.
- "Movie Review: The System is an old-fashioned commercial flic". DAWN.com. Mohammad Kamran Jawaid. 4 June 2014.
- "Movie Review: The System is poor man's 'Dabang'". HIP. Wajiha Jawaid.
- "The System: Inside job". DAWN.com. Saeed Awan.
