= Rishton Ka Mela =

2015 Indian television mini-series

- Created by: Subhash Chandra
- Country of origin: India
- Original language: Hindi
- No. of seasons: 1
- No. of episodes: 10

Production
- Producer: Subhash Chandra
- Production locations: Mumbai, Maharashtra, India
- Camera setup: Multi-camera
- Production company: Essel Vision Productions

Original release
- Network: Zee TV
- Release: 27 April – 8 May 2015

Rishton Ka Mela is an Indian television mini-series, which premiered on 27 April 2015 on Zee TV. The series was produced by Essel Vision Productions. It was a mini-series, consisting of only 10 episodes, and ended on 8 May 2015. Indian television actors and actresses Sargun Mehta, Sayantani Ghosh, Karan Veer Mehra, Ratan Rajput, Usha Nadkarni, Eijaz Khan, Anupam Shyam, Karan Grover and Dhriti Bhatia were signed for the series.

== Cast ==
- Sargun Mehta as Dipika
- Sayantani Ghosh as Naina/Naagin
- Adaa Khan as Shruti
- Dhriti Bhatia as Radha
- Karan Veer Mehra as Karan Singh Gurjar
- Usha Nadkarni as Shanta Tai/Mela(Fare)'s owner
- Eijaz Khan as Inspector Hooda
- Anupam Shyam as Sahukaar
- Tanushree Kaushal as Jhumri's Mother In Law
- Poonampreet Bhatia as Ritu
- Farhina Parvez as Mandy
- Hiten Tejwani as Rahul
- Srman Jain as Stephan
- Smita Singh as Kamla
- Ratan Rajput as Jhumri
- Gauri Pradhan Tejwani as Neha
- Karan Grover as Akshay

== Music ==
Title themes were composed by Mohit Pathak & background score was done by Mohit Pathak & Shailesh Suvarna.
