= Aghori (TV series) =

2019 Indian television series

- Also known as: Ek Shakti...Ek Aghori
- Genre: Drama; Romance; Thriller; Supernatural
- Created by: Essel Vision Productions
- Story by: Mrinal Jha
- Creative director: Uday Rakesh Berry
- Starring: Simaran Kaur; Gaurav Chopra; Parag Tyagi
- Country of origin: India
- Original language: Hindi
- No. of seasons: 1
- No. of episodes: 27

Production
- Camera setup: Multi-camera
- Running time: 45 minutes

Original release
- Network: Zee TV
- Release: 22 June – 29 September 2019

Aghori is an Indian television series that is produced by Essel Vision Productions. It was aired from 22 June to 29 September 2019 on Zee TV and starred Simaran Kaur, Parag Tyagi and Gaurav Chopra as Kamakshi, Rudranath and Advik.

== Synopsis ==
The story of an Aghori. The show starts with Advik. He is called by Mahaguru Rudranath. Rudranaath says Advik that he find the girl whom he had been looking for many years. Rudranath sends Advik to fetch that girl. Rudranath's disciple asks Rudranath why he wants the same girl. Then Rudranath tells him that she is not a common girl. That girl was born dead and her guru Chaitanya gave her life with the power of Panchtatva. Mahaguru Chatanya put his life at stake while saving Kamakshi. Rudranath also kills Kamakshi's parents and then an Aghoran said Kamakshi's mother Priya that if Kamakshi is married before the completion of 23 years, Rudranath will not spoil her.

== Cast ==
=== Main ===
- Simaran Kaur as Kamakshi Chandrashekhar
- Gaurav Chopra as Advik / Adhvik Mehra
- Parag Tyagi as Rudranath Bhairav / Aghori

=== Recurring ===
- Nidhi Uttam as Priya Bhandari Chandrashekhar, Kamakshi's mother
- Charu Mehra as Rashi Bhandari, Kamakshi's cousin
- Salman Shaikh as Chirag Bhandari, Kamakshi's cousin
- Geetanjali Mishra as Dravya Sunarivasan / Aghoran
- Preeti Puri as Suman Bhandari, Kamakshi's aunt
- Syed Zafar Ali as Jaibheem Bhandari, Kamakshi's uncle
- Hardeek Joshi as Vipranjali "Vipra" Bhandari, Kamakshi's uncle
- Kasturi Banerjee
- Nikita Chopra
- Ibrar Yakub as Kamakshi's maternal uncle
- Vimarsh Roshan as Kamakshi's maternal uncle
- Ram Awana as Mahaguru Chatanya – Rudranaath's guru
- Vineet Kumar
- Aditya Deshmukh
- Poulomi Das as Ashmi
- Malhar Pandya as Aghori Indra
- Mahi Sharma
- Pakhi Mendola as Aaraa – Kamakshi's maternal uncle's daughter
- Paras Chhabra as Soham – an aghori

== Episodes ==
Episodes	Titles	Release date	Duration
1	As per Rudranath's commands, Adhvik creates mishaps in Kamakshi's wedding-Aghori	22 June	46m
2	Adhvik, Indar and Aasmi try hard to abduct Kamakshi – Aghori	23 June	45m
3	Rudranath attacks Dravya using his supernatural powers-Aghori	29 June	42m
4	Dravya, Soham and Shanaya stand against Adhvik, Indar and Aasmi-Aghori	30 June	43m
5	Param is confused about Dravya's invitation to discuss Adhvik's wedding-Aghori	6 July	43m
6	Dravya's new decision shocks Kamakshi's family and Adhvik – Aghori	7 July	43m
7	Adhvik gets captivated by some unknown power – Aghori	13 July	43m
8	Kamakshi explains to Hariyali that she is obsessed with Adhvik – Aghori	14 July	43m
9	Kamakshi to be sacrificed – Aghori	27 July	43m
10	Rashi and Aara support Kamakshi – Aghori	28 July	44m
11	Adhvik's shocking revelation – Aghori	3 August	44m
12	Adhvik and Kamakshi search for Aara – Aghori	4 August	43m
13	Another 'kankali' is back – Aghori	10 August	44m
14	Kauravi follows Dravya – Aghori	11 August	43m
15	Adhvik rescues Aara – Aghori	17 August	44m
16	Kamakshi learns about Adhvik's parents – Aghori	18 August	44m
17	Kauravi helps Kamakshi escape – Aghori	24 August	44m
18	Kamakshi and Adhvik fight together – Aghori	25 August	44m
19	Dravya helps Kamakshi escape from Adhvik – Aghori	31 August	44m
20	Kauravi makes a new 'Kankali' – Aghori	1 September	44m
