= Yash Tonk =

Indian television actor

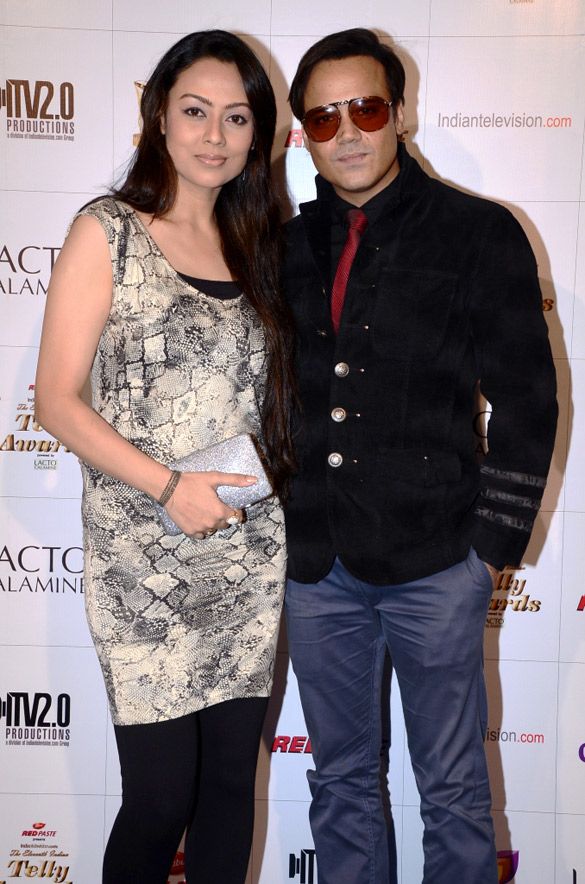
- Born: Yashpal Tonk; 30 October 1971 (age 54); Sonipat, Haryana, India
- Education: Campus School
- Occupation: Actor
- Years active: 1999–present
- Spouse: Gauri Yadav Tonk
- Children: 2

Yash Tonk (born 30 October 1971) is an Indian actor from Sonipat District, Haryana.

== Personal life ==
Yash is married to Gauri Yadav. Gauri is also an actress and they were a popular couple on the TV show Nach Baliye and they also made it to the finals. They have two daughters, Pari Tonk and Myrah Tonk.

== Filmography ==
=== Films ===
Year	Title	Role	Notes
1999	Sangharsh	Unnamed	Special appearance
2003	Janasheen	Max	
2003	Ishq Vishk	Rocky Dutt	
2003	Kucch To Hai	Yash	
2003	Tumse Milke Wrong Number	Inspector Aditya	
2004	Julie	Neil	
2004	Popcorn Khao! Mast Ho Jao	Goldie	
2006	Fight Club - Members Only	Mohit	
2008	Kisse Pyaar Karoon	Amit	
2009	Main Aur Mrs Khanna	Harsh	
2009	Team - The Force	Yash Khan	
2013	Kisse Pyaar Karoon 2	Harsh	
2014	Jai Ho	Babu	
2014	Familywala		
2016	Rocky Handsome		
2019	Manikarnika: The Queen of Jhansi	Rao Tula Ram	
2022	Haryana	Mahender	

=== Television ===
- Karma: Mayavi Nagari - Karma
- Fantistic Four Rise of Silver surfer
- Kuch Toh Hai Tere Mere Darmiyaan - Thakur
- Yeh Vaada Raha - Ranveer Khanna
- Ek Thhi Naayka - Dheeraj Dasgupta
- Byaah Hamari Bahoo Ka - Yash Purohit
- Sarvggun Sampanna - Karan Kapadia (K.K.)
- Tere Liye - Padmanabhan
- Nach Baliye 2 - Himself
- Kyunki Saas Bhi Kabhi Bahu Thi - Shiv Singhania
- Kaho Naa Yaar Hai - Himself
- Arre Deewano Mujhe Pehchano - Himself
- Karam Apnaa Apnaa - Shiv / Samar Kapoor
- Kesar - Harman
- Kasautii Zindagii Kay - Debo
- Kaahin Kissii Roz - Kunal Sikand / Nikhil Arya / Kuljeet Singh / Ramola ka per pota
- Karam - Jai
- Kundali - Abhishek Agarwal
- Just Mohabbat - Harveer Singh Sodhi
- Saara Akaash - Kabir / Suresh Desai
- Shobha Somnath Ki - Dadda Chalukya
- Jaat Ki Jugni - Choudhary Gajendra Singh Ahlawat
- Roop - Mard Ka Naya Swaroop - Shamsher Singh
- Pavitra Bandhan - Gireesh Roy Chaudhri
- Kyun Utthe Dil Chhod Aaye (2021) - Brij Kishore Sahani
- Swaran Ghar (2022) - Baljeet "Ballu " Bedi
- Dhruv Tara – Samay Sadi Se Pare (2023) - Maharaj Udaybhan Singh
