= Power Couple (Indian TV series) =

2015 Indian television series

- Genre: Reality
- Created by: Colosceum Media Pvt Ltd
- Based on: Power Couple
- Directed by: T V Vinod
- Creative directors: Devika Sanghvi, Stuthi Raghavan
- Presented by: Arbaaz Khan; Malaika Arora
- Country of origin: India
- Original language: Hindi
- No. of seasons: 1
- No. of episodes: 26

Production
- Producer: Lalit Sharma
- Production location: Goa
- Cinematography: Akshay Rajput
- Production company: Colosceum Media

Original release
- Network: Sony Entertainment Television
- Release: 12 December 2015 – 12 March 2016

Power Couple is an Indian reality show which aired on Sony Entertainment Television, it was launched on 12 December 2015. The series is produced by Lalit Sharma of Colosceum Media Pvt Ltd. The series is the Indian adaptation of the Israeli television series Power Couple.

The series features 10 popular celebrity couples from across fields, who will compete with each other over various challenges. They will be tested in one roof whether these couples love and trust each other or not. The series is shot in Goa and is hosted by Arbaaz Khan and Malaika Arora Khan. The first season of Power Couple India was won by Naved and Sayeeda. Shahwar Ali and Marcella were the runner-up.

== Couple Status ==
Couples	Status
Naved & Sayeeda	Winner
Shawar & Marcela	Runner-up
Vindu & Dina	Eliminated; 8th
Aamir & Sanjeeda	Eliminated; 7th
Salil & Ria	Eliminated; 6th
Ashmit & Mahek	Eliminated; 5th
Apurva & Shilpa	Eliminated; 4th
Percy & Delnaaz	Eliminated; 3rd
Sandip & Jesse	Eliminated; 2nd
Rahul R. & Pratyusha	Eliminated; 1st
Rahul D. & Mugdha	Quit

== See also ==
- I Can Do That
