= Sumeet Sachdev =

Indian television actor

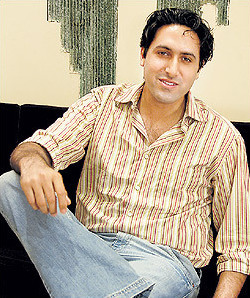
- Born: 18 March 1976 (age 50)
- Occupations: Actor; architect
- Years active: 2002–present
- Height: 6 ft 1 in (1.85 m)
- Spouse: Amrita Gujral (m. 2007)

Sumeet Sachdev (born 18 March 1976) is an Indian television actor and architect who is best known for his role as Gautam "Gomzy" Virani in Kyunki Saas Bhi Kabhi Bahu Thi and Abhimanyu "Mani" Raghav in Yeh Hai Mohabbatein.

== Early life and education ==
Sachdev was brought up in Delhi. His younger brother Sandeep was the winner of Season 1 in the Indian reality show, Biggest Loser Jeetega. Sachdev is an architect by profession. He is known for playing the role of Gautam Virani along with his former classmate Smriti Irani in the 2000 Indian soap opera, Kyunki Saas Bhi Kabhi Bahu Thi.

== Career ==
Sachdev made his acting debut in Aamir Reza Hussain's tribute to Kargil war heroes, The Fifty Days War. He later auditioned for the role of Sahil Virani in the show Kyunki Saas Bhi Kabhi Bahu Thi, but was finalized for another role in the same serial, Gautam "Gomzy" Virani. Sachdev gained popularity and recognition for his role as Gautam and made a prominent position for himself in the Indian television fraternity. Sachdev played a negative character for the first time as Rohit in the serial Kya Hadsaa Kya Haqeeqat. He was finalized to play a negative character for the second time as Swayam in the serial Kahiin To Hoga but resigned due to back problems. Sachdev played the lead male role of Kabir Khan in Khwaish, his character was killed off but during the end of the serial Sachdev was brought back in another role as Kamran. In November 2009, Sachdev made a comeback in TV after a year's break in Pyaar Ka Bandhan as Raunak. Moreover, Sachdev has been cast as Rudra in the serial Bandini. He played Abhimanyu "Mani" Raghav in Yeh Hai Mohabbatein. He was last seen as Sumer Babbar in Chashni

== Personal life ==
Sachdev married Amrita Gujral, the head of International Media Marketing at The Times of India on 9 December 2007. The wedding took place in Gujral's home town of Chandigarh, India.

== Television ==
Year	Serial	Role	Notes
2002	Kya Hadsaa Kya Haqeeqat – Hadsaa	Rohit	
2002–2008	Kyunki Saas Bhi Kabhi Bahu Thi	Gautam "Gomzy" Virani	
2003	Kya Hadsaa Kya Haqeeqat – Khaall	Rajeev Khandelwal	
2006; 2007–2008	Karam Apnaa Apnaa	Shashank Basu	
2007	Khwaish	Kabir Khan	
2008	Khwaish	Kamran	Cameo
2009–2010	Pyaar Ka Bandhan	Raunak	Supporting role
2010	Bandini	Rudra	Cameo
2014	Yeh Hai Aashiqui – This Or That?	Aseem Sen	Episodic role
2014; 2016–2019	Yeh Hai Mohabbatein	Abhimanyu "Mani" Raghav	Supporting role
2018	C.I.D.	Ankush / Jigar	Episodic role
2023	Chashni	Sumer Babbar	Supporting role
2025	Aye Dil Jee Le Zara	Karan Bindra	Supporting role
2025–2026	Jhanak	Aniruddh Bose	Supporting role
2026	Kyunki Saas Bhi Kabhi Bahu Thi 2	Advocate Gautam 'Gomzy' Virani	Supporting role

=== Reality shows ===
Year	Show	Role	Notes
2014–2015	Box Cricket League 1	Contestant	
2016	Box Cricket League 2	Contestant	
2018	Box Cricket League 3	Contestant	

=== Web series ===
Year	Show	Role
2023	Slum Golf	Kumud Vajpayee
2023	Adhure Hum	Abhimanyu
