= Rangdari =

- Directed by: Avinash Nanda Abhimanyu Mishra
- Written by: Ikram Akhtar; Sanjay Masoomm
- Starring: Gaurav Chopra; Kajal Yadav; Manjul Aasim Azhar Mirza
- Cinematography: Rajkumar K.
- Edited by: Nipun A. Gupta
- Music by: Lalit Pandit
- Production company: Contrapunto Communications
- Release date: April 2013
- Country: India
- Language: Hindi

Rangdari (Hindi: रंगदारी) is an action film starring Gaurav Chopra, Kajal Yadav, Manjul Aasim, Azhar Mirza, Mushtaq Khan, Kiran Kumar, Shakti Kapoor, and others.

== Plot ==
The film follows Taimur Ansaar, a criminal-cum-politician who rules the badlands of 6 states of North India. As he rises to power, his friendship with his good friend Brij Singh sours, transforming the best of friends into the worst of enemies. In their fight to eliminate each other and stay in power, the two lose some of their near and dear ones. The struggle wasn't just about staying in power, but being the supreme player, Rangdari. But irrespective of his profession, the common people view Taimur as a Messiah... a real-life Robinhood who helps the needy.

== Cast ==
- Gaurav Chopra as Taimur Ansaar
- Kajal Yadav as Shabana
- Manjul Aasim as Brij Singh
- Azhar Mirza as goonga
- Kiran Kumar as Galib Singh
- Ali Quli Mirza as Nankau
- Shakti Kapoor as Sukhdev Singh
- Mushtaq Khan as Bhaiya Jagtap
- Raju Mavani as Sadhu Singh
