= Haryana (film) =

- Directed by: Sandeep Baswana
- Written by: Sandeep Baswana
- Produced by: B. Raja; Sandeep Baswana
- Starring: Yash Tonk; Ashlesha Sawant; Monica Sharma; Aakarshan Singh; Robbie Marih
- Cinematography: Johnny Lal
- Edited by: Sanyukta Kaza and Jitendra Dongare
- Music by: Mohit Pathak
- Production company: Raja Baswana Films
- Release date: 5 August 2022
- Country: India
- Language: Hindi

Haryana is a 2022 Indian Hindi language romantic comedy film starring Yash Tonk, Ashlesha Sawant, Robbie Marih, Monica Sharma and Aakarshan Singh. The film is directed, story and screenplay by Sandeep Baswana. Television actress Ashlesha Sawant will mark her Bollywood debut with Haryana.

== Cast ==
- Yash Tonk as Mahender
- Ashlesha Sawant as Bimla
- Robbie Mairh as Jaibeer
- Monica Sharma as Vasudha
- Aakarshan Singh as Jugnu
