= Yeh Moh Moh Ke Dhaagey =

- Genre: Indian Soap Opera; Drama; Romance
- Created by: Ochre Moving Pictures
- Written by: Saba Mumtaz, S. Manasvi
- Directed by: Sisanda Henna
- Creative director: Ashish Golwalkar
- Starring: Niyati Fatnani; Eijaz Khan
- Opening theme: Moh Moh Ke Dhaage
- Composer: Anu Malik
- Country of origin: India
- Original language: Hindi
- No. of seasons: 1
- No. of episodes: 109

Production
- Executive producer: Stan Joseph
- Producer: Portia Gumede and Rahul Tewary
- Production location: Mumbai
- Camera setup: Multi-camera
- Running time: 22 minutes (approx.)
- Production company: Ochre Moving Pictures

Original release
- Network: Sony TV
- Release: March 21 – August 18, 2017

Yeh Moh Moh Ke Dhaage was an Indian TV serial. It premiered on 21 March 2017 on Sony TV and ended on 18 August 2017. The series was produced by Mumtaz Saba Productions in association with Ochre Moving Pictures.

== Synopsis ==
The story is set in Gujarat. The plot centers around a mature village man Radhan Raj Katara "Rajai" who is a single man and lives with his sisters Dhingly and Rami in the small village of Amboli. He is looking for a bride with the help of Arundhati "Aru" who works for a matrimonial website and is based in the city of Ahmedabad. Arundhati is a 21-year old ambitious girl who works hard, living with her parents and her elder sister Dharmi in their uncle's house. Raidhan Raj Katara is the village councillor (Mukhi ji), unwilling to marry someone at the age of 42. He agrees under Dhingly's(Mishri) influence because Dhingly is marrying a young Deep. Aru is hired to find a girl for Mukhi ji. The two get to know each other and are surprised by each other's behaviors as they break stereotypes.

At last Aru's sister, Dharmi, professes a willingness to marry Mukhi ji so she can start a new life after her first husband leaves her to marry a rich girl. On the wedding day, Mukhi ji's elder sister, Rami, encourages and helps Dharmi run away to prevent Mukhi ji from getting married. At the request of Dhingly and Aru's parents, Aru marries Mukhi ji. The story then revolves around the relationship that develops between Mukhi ji and Aru and how they become part of each other's lives and dreams.

== Cast ==
- Niyati Fatnani as Arundhati Raidhan Katara / Aru / Mukhiyani
- Eijaz Khan as Raidhan Raj Katara / Mukhi ji
- Rima Ramanuj as Mishri Raj Katara / Dhingli, Mukhi ji's younger sister
- Ananya Khare as Rami Ben, Mukhi ji's elder sister who plots to kill him
- Jiya Mustafa as Dharmishta Nanavati / Dharmi
- Neha Narang as Rupa
- Benaf Dadachandji as Saanvi
- Muni Jha as Arundhati and Dharmishta's father
- Ani Sonpal as Savita Nanavati, Arundhati and Dharmishta's mother
- Mugdha Shah as Rasika, Arundhati's aunt / Kaki
- Kenneth Desai as Arundhati's uncle / Kaka
- Shivam Agarwal as Kishan
- Manish Khanna as Lalji Bhai
- Akshita Mudgal as Rasika's daughter

== Music ==
Hina Khan covered the song "Moh Moh Ke Dhagey" for the show, which was originally sung by singer Monali Thakur.
