= Ashlesha Sawant =

Indian television actress

- Born: 24 September 1984 (age 42); Pune, Maharashtra, India
- Occupation: Actress
- Years active: 2002–present
- Height: 5 ft 8 in (1.73 m)
- Spouse: Sandeep Baswana (m. 2025)

Ashlesha Sawant (born 24 September 1984) is an Indian actress who primarily works in Hindi television. She made her acting debut with Kyunki Saas Bhi Kabhi Bahu Thi portraying Teesha Mehta Virani. Sawant is best known for her portrayal in Saat Phere – Saloni Ka Safar, Pyaar Ka Dard Hai Meetha Meetha Pyaara Pyaara, Kumkum Bhagya and Anupamaa. She made her film debut with Haryana (2022).

== Early life ==
Sawant was born on 24 September 1984 in Pune; she completed her T.Y.B.Com in 2003. Her father is in the Indian Air Force.

== Career ==
After completing her schooling, she got into local modelling for about a year. Then she started training for the Gladrags contest. During that time, Balaji's auditions were taking place in Pune and she went to the auditions for a lark. They shortlisted her for Kya Hadsaa Kya Haqeeqat, and she had to move to Mumbai. The KHKH shoot did not happen, and she played a small role in Kasautii Zindagii Kay as Rishab Bajaj's associate. Ekta Kapoor informed Sawant that she was keen to cast her in Kyunki Saas Bhi Kabhi Bahu Thi (Star Plus) and Kammal (Zee TV). She accepted both offers. Sawant also played the role of Rohit Sharma's wife in Des Mein Niklla Hoga Chand. She played the role of Preeti in Pyaar Ka Dard Hai Meetha Meetha Pyaara Pyaara. She played the role of Meera, Riya Mehra's governess in Kumkum Bhagya. Since 2022, she has been portraying Barkha Kapadia opposite Rohit Bakshi in Anupamaa.

== Personal life ==
Sawant met actor Sandeep Baswana in 2002, on the sets of Kyunki Saas Bhi Kabhi Bahu Thi and they eventually began dating. After being together for 23 years, Sawant and Baswana married on 16 November 2025 in Vrindavan.

== Filmography ==
=== Films ===
Year	Title	Role	Notes	Ref.
2022	Haryana	Bimla		

=== Television ===
Year	Title	Role	Notes	Ref.
2002–2003	Kyunki Saas Bhi Kabhi Bahu Thi	Teesha Mehta Virani		
2002–2003	Kammal	Anita Bhatia Jajoo		
2003	Kasautii Zindagii Kay	Rishabh Bajaj's associate	Cameo appearance	
2003	Kya Hadsaa Kya Haqeeqat	Sonia Mehra	Episode: "Karzz"	
2003–2004	Kahiin to Hoga	Mouli Sinha		
2003–2004	Des Mein Niklla Hoga Chand	Anjali Sharma		
2004–2005	Baal Baal Bacche	Menaka		
2005–2009	Saat Phere – Saloni Ka Safar	Tara Singh		
2006	Kaisa Ye Pyar Hai	Sheetal		
2006	Vaidehi	Bhumija Jaisingh Singhania		
2009–2010	Pavitra Rishta	Urmila Sagar		
2009–2010	Bayttaab Dil Kee Tamanna Hai	Lekha		
2010–2011	Dil Se Diya Vachan	Urmila Rajadhyaksha		
2012–2014	Pyaar Ka Dard Hai Meetha Meetha Pyaara Pyaara	Preeti Diwan Deshpande		
2015	Phir Bhi Na Maane...Badtameez Dil	Nishi Sahni		
2016	Vishkanya Ek Anokhi Prem Kahani	Mandira / Kala Saaya		
2017–2018	Porus	Pritha		
2018	Mayavi Maling	Mandari		
2019–2021	Kumkum Bhagya	Meera		
2022–2023; 2024	Anupamaa	Barkha Mehta Kapadia		
2024	Gudiya Rani	Aruni		
2025–2026	Jhanak	Arshi Mukherjee Bose		
2026–present	Dilo Ki Ram Leela	Ragini Sehgal		

== Awards ==
Year	Award	Category	Serial	Outcome
2007	Indian Telly Awards	Best Actress in a Supporting Role	Saat Phere	Nominated
