= ITA Award for Best Actress in a Supporting Role =

Indian Television Academy award

- Awarded for: Best Performance by a female Actor in a Supporting Role on Television
- Country: India
- First award: Shilpa Saklani for Kyunki Saas Bhi Kabhi Bahu Thi (2005)
- Currently held by: Sarita Joshi for Pushpa Impossible (2024)

ITA Award for Best Actress in a Supporting Role is an award given by Indian Television Academy Awards as a part of its annual event for TV serials, to recognize a female actor who has delivered an outstanding performance in a Supporting Role.

== Winners ==
Year	Actor	Character	Show	Ref
2005	Shilpa Saklani	Ganga Sahil Virani	Kyunki Saas Bhi Kabhi Bahu Thi	
2006	Vaishali Thakkar	Praveena Thakkar	Baa Bahoo Aur Baby	
2007	Achint Kaur	Vedika	Virrudh	
2008	Sadiya Siddiqui	Sandhya	Balika Vadhu	
2009	Smita Bansal	Sumitra	Balika Vadhu	
2010	Supriya Pilgaonkar	Shailaja	Sasural Genda Phool	
2011	Bhairavi Raichura	Rajni	Sasural Genda Phool	
2012	Rupal Patel	Kokila Modi	Saath Nibhana Saathiya	
2013	Neelu Vaghela	Santosh "Bhabho" Rathi	Diya Aur Baati Hum	
2014	Neelu Vaghela	Santosh "Bhabho" Rathi	Diya Aur Baati Hum	
2015	Mrunal Thakur	Bulbul Arora	Kumkum Bhagya	
2016	Meghna Malik	Suhasini Sinha	Dahleez	
2016	Sushmita Mukherjee	Kanta	Gangaa	
2017	Rajeshwari Sachdev	Radhabai	Peshwa Bajirao	
2018	Jaya Bhattacharya	Radhika Malhotra	Silsila Badalte Rishton Ka	
2019	Rajeshwari Sachdev	Mamta	Dil Hi Toh Hai	
2020	Munmun Dutta	Babita Iyer	Taarak Mehta Ka Ooltah Chashmah	
2021	Anita Raj	Kulwant Kaur Dhillon	Choti Sarrdaarni	
2022	Sarita Joshi	Radha Limaye	Pushpa Impossible	
2023	Lubna Salim	Santosh Kaur Monga	Teri Meri Doriyaann	
2024	Sarita Joshi	Radha Limaye	Pushpa Impossible	
