= Puja Banerjee =

Indian television and movie actress (born 1987)

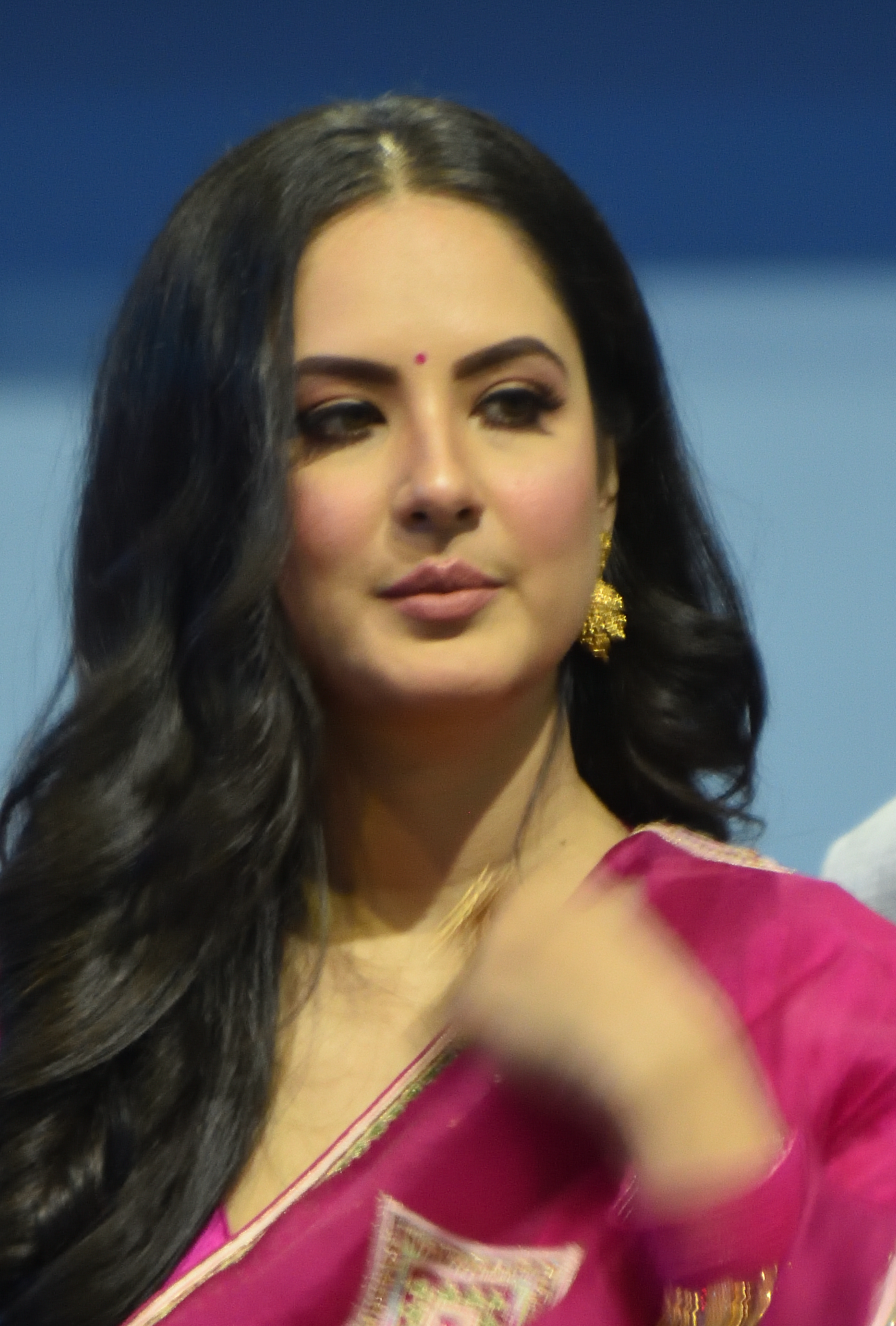
- Banerjee at 29th Kolkata International Film Festival in 2023
- Born: 6 February 1987 (age 39); Kolkata, West Bengal, India
- Other name: Puja Bose
- Occupation: Actress
- Spouse: Kunal Verma (m. 2020)
- Children: 2

Puja Banerjee, (born 6 February 1987) also sometimes credited as Pooja Bose or simply Pooja, is an Indian actress who appears predominantly in Bengali films and Hindi television. She is well known for playing Vrinda in the show Tujh Sang Preet Lagai Sajna, which aired on Star Plus. She participated in Jhalak Dikhhla Jaa (2014) and Comedy Nights Bachao (2015).

== Career ==
After starting her television career with Kahaani Hamaaray Mahaabhaarat Ki (2008), Banerjee was seen in the romantic show Tujh Sang Preet Lagai Sajna, in which she played the role of a simple Punjabi girl, Vrinda.

She made her debut in the Telugu film titled Veedu Theda. She has also acted in the film Macho Mustanaa, with Hiran Chatterjee (formerly called Macho Mustafaa), but the title was changed due to objections from Muslim clerics regarding the use of the word "Mustafaa". She won a role in Raja Chanda's film Challenge 2, starring Deepak Adhikari and Sujit Mondal's film Rocky, starring Mahaakshay Chakraborty. Banerjee participated in Jhalak Dikhhla Jaa 7, where she was credited as Puja Bose. Her choreographer was Rajit Dev, who is also the chief choreographer to Vaibhavi Merchant.

From 2015 to 2017, she appeared in Comedy Nights Bachao. Banerjee later joined the cast of Zee TV's Qubool Hai playing the role of Afreen. She also played Yasmine in Razia Sultan which aired on &TV. In 2016, she participated in Bigg Boss Bangla and Comedy Nights Live.

In 2017, she played Mehak in Dev which also starred Ashish Chaudhary and Sumona Chakravarti. She returned to the show in 2018 with season 2. In 2019, she participated in Kitchen Champion 5 and Khatra Khatra Khatra followed by playing Makdina in Vish. In 2020, she played Vaishno Devi in Jag Janani Maa Vaishno Devi - Kahani Mata Rani Ki.

In 2022 after a hiatus of two years Banerjee returned to acting with StarPlus's Anupamaa's prequel web series Anupama: Namaste America as Ritika.

== Personal life ==
At the age of 18, she eloped and got married, which lasted for 3 years.

In 2020, she married her Tujh Sang Preet Lagai Sajna co star Kunal Verma. Banerjee and Verma have one son and a daughter. In April 2026, she revealed her second pregnancy on her YouTube channel. In August 2026, she welcomed her second child, a girl.

== Controversies ==
During June 2025, she has been accused of abduction, extortion of bengali film producer Shyam Sundar Dey. FIR was lodged against her and her husband Kunal Verma under various sections of BNS (Bharatiya Nyaya Sanhita, 2023).

== Filmography ==
=== Films ===
Key
†	Denotes films that have not yet been released

List of Puja Banerjee film credits
Year	Title	Role	Language	Notes
2011	Veedu Theda	Meghna	Telugu	
2012	Macho Mastanaa	Diya	Bengali	
2012	Challenge 2	Pooja	Bengali	
2013	Rajdhani Express	Sunita	Hindi	
2013	Loveria	Sweety	Bengali	
2013	Rocky	Nandini	Bengali	
2013	Oh! Henry	Brishti	Bengali	
2013	Proloy	Unnamed	Bengali	Special appearance as Item Dancer
2013	Ramaiya Vastavaiya	Unnamed	Hindi	Cameo
2014	Teen Patti	Mohor	Bengali	
2016	Great Grand Masti	Sapna Amar Saxena	Hindi	
2018	Hoichoi Unlimited	Lola	Bengali	
2019	Bibaho Obhijaan	Unnamed	Bengali	Special appearance as Item Dancer
2024	Athhoi	Unnamed	Bengali	Special appearance as Item Dancer
2024	Aho Vikramaarka	Unnamed	Telugu	Special appearance as Item Dancer
TBA	3 Dev	TBA	Hindi	Special appearance as Item Dancer

=== Television ===
List of Puja Banerjee television credits
Year	Title	Role	Notes
2008	Kahaani Hamaaray Mahaabhaarat Ki	Radha	
2008	Kahaani Ghar Ghar Kii	Vrinda Shehrawat	Guest
2008	Karam Apnaa Apnaa	Vrinda Shehrawat	Guest
2008	Sapna Babul Ka... Bidaai	Vrinda Shehrawat	Guest
2008–2010	Tujh Sang Preet Lagai Sajna	Vrinda Shehrawat	
2009	Kis Desh Mein Hai Meraa Dil	Vrinda Shehrawat	Guest
2009	Kasturi	Vrinda Shehrawat	Guest
2009	Yeh Rishta Kya Kehlata Hai	Vrinda Shehrawat	Guest
2009	Raja Ki Aayegi Baraat	Vrinda Shehrawat	Guest
2009	Kayamath	Vrinda Shehrawat	Guest
2009	Mitwa Phool Kamal Ke	Vrinda Shehrawat	Guest
2010	Sajan Ghar Jaana Hai	Vrinda Shehrawat	Guest
2010	Saath Nibhaana Saathiya	Herself	Guest
2010	Sarvggun Sampanna	Swara	
2011	Balika Vadhu	Herself	Guest
2012	Ek Hazaaron Mein Meri Behna Hai	Herself	Guest
2013–2014	Devon Ke Dev - Mahadev	Goddess Parvati	
2013	Comedy Nights with Kapil	Herself	Guest
2014	Jhalak Dikhhla Jaa 7	Contestant	11th place
2015	Razia Sultan	Yasmine	
2015–2017	Comedy Nights Bachao	Contestant	
2015–2016	Qubool Hai	Afreen	
2015	Darr Sabko Lagta Hai	Dr. Radhika	
2015	Jhalak Dikhhla Jaa 8	Herself	Guest
2015	Comedy Classes	Herself	Guest
2016	Bigg Boss 9	Herself	Guest
2016	Fear Factor: Khatron Ke Khiladi 7	Herself	Guest
2016	Comedy Nights Live	Herself	Guest
2016	Bigg Boss Bangla 2	Herself	Guest
2017	Jhalak Dikhhla Jaa 9	Herself	Guest
2017	Dev	Mehak Burman/Vaani Sahay	
2017	Comedy Dangal	Contestant	
2018	Prithvi Vallabh	Vikramjeet's wife	
2019	Kitchen Champion 5	Herself	Guest
2019	Khatra Khatra Khatra	Herself	Guest
2019	Vish	Makdina	
2020	Jag Janani Maa Vaishno Devi	Goddess Vaishno Devi	
2022	The Kapil Sharma Show	Customer	
2023	Dance Bangla Dance	Judge	

=== Web series ===
List of Puja Banerjee web series credits
Year	Title	Role	Notes	Ref.
2019–2021	Paap	Parboni 'Paru'/ Rubina	Bengali Web Series on Hoichoi	
2022	Anupama: Namaste America	Ritika		
2024	Cabaret	Elina	Bengali Web Series on Addatimes	
2024-2025	Jai Mahalakshmi	Goddess Mahalakshmi/Adi Parashakti	Hari Om App	

=== Music videos ===
List of Puja Banerjee music video credits
Year	Album	Song	Singer	Label
2016	Aap Se Mausiiquii	"Aap Se Mausiiquii"	Himesh Reshammiya	T-Series, HR Musik Limited
