= Sarvggun Sampanna =

Indian television series

- Intertitle
- Genre: Drama
- Created by: Balaji Telefilms
- Written by: Shirish Latkar; Sachin Darekar; Vandana Tewari
- Directed by: Deepak Chavan; Hemant Prabhu; Fahad kashmiri Roy V.George
- Creative director: Neha Kothari
- Starring: Puja Banerjee
- Composer: Amit Jha
- Country of origin: India
- Original language: Hindi
- No. of episodes: 125

Production
- Producers: Ekta Kapoor; Shobha Kapoor
- Running time: 24 minutes
- Production company: Balaji Telefilms

Original release
- Network: NDTV Imagine
- Release: 11 May – 29 October 2010

Shrimati Swara Raje Deshmukh Sarvggun Sampanna is an Indian television drama series that aired on NDTV Imagine.

Based on the backdrop of Kolapur, some initial scenes were filmed there and the rest on sets in Mumbai.

== Story ==
Set in Kolhapur, Sarvagunna Sampanna is the story of Swara, a well-known theatre dancer who is an only child of poor parents. She and her parents work in a theatre group that puts up shows in and around the small towns of Maharashtra. Swara's parents do not want their daughter to continue with dancing as a career and want her to settle down with a good husband. It seems that their prayers are answered when Swara gets a proposal of marriage from one of the most respected families in Kolhapur.

Life takes a big turn when she becomes the daughter-in-law of the most respectable and esteemed family of Kolhapur — the Deshmukhes. Life seems like a Cinderella tale for Swara as she is accepted by every member of the house, including her husband Aditya, who initially was reluctant to marrying her. But soon her past and background catches up with her; the fact of her being a "Lavni dancer" opens up in front of her in-laws and Swaara's life crashes in front of her. From here starts Swara's struggle to rebuild her life and one day attain the pinnacle she had dreamt of.

== Cast ==
- Puja Banerjee as Swara: The only child of her parents, Swara is a very simple and innocent girl. Her elegance is reflected in her eyes. She loves dancing and has a good voice. A versatile dancer, she performs in plays, skits and her dance is the medium of her family's income. To her, dance is just not a source of income but a prayer to the almighty and respects her profession. Though people abase her for being a Lavani dancer, Swara does not feel anything degrading about it and she has the strength to stand up for what she believes. Her parents are everything to her. Their words and their wish is her command. She cannot resist even a single inch of insult of her parents. She can defy anything in the world for them. She is perfect in every sense, respects for elders, very true and genuine young woman whose dreams are not so high: just to settle down with a simple person and have a happy life. She adores them and they are her pride. Later on in the story this will become an issue with her husband as both will stand opposite each other for their parents and ultimately part ways.
- Sunita Rao as Manjula: Swaara's mother Manjula just has one dream from the time her daughter was born. She just wants to see her daughter settle down with a simple nice person and settle down. She is good at heart and is always concerned about Swara.
- Pramod Pawar as Parshuram: A nice, happy go lucky man, he is part of the troupe in which Swara performs. He is very much attached to his profession as to him this is the only thing which feeds him and his family. He dots on his daughter and like her mother wants to see her settled.
- Abhinav Kohli as Ayush: The lead families second son. His character is that of a professor who is a self-made man. He teaches in the same college which his father runs but never tries to take advantage of the fact. He has reached his current position due to his hard work.
- Chaitanya Choudhury as Aditya Raje Deshmukh
- Yash Tonk as Karan Kapadia (K.K.)

== Replacement ==
Sarvggun Sampanna concluded its final episode on 29 October 2010 on Imagine TV, which was then replaced by another Balaji show Kitani Mohabbat Hai Season 2.
