= Gaurav Chopra =

Indian television actor (born 1979)

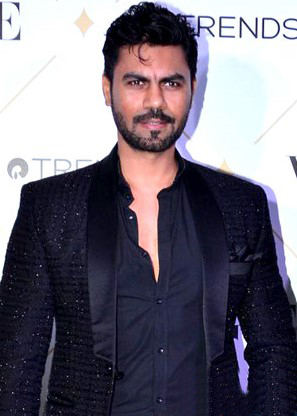
- Gaurav at Vogue Beauty Awards
- Born: 4 April 1979 (age 47); New Delhi, India
- Occupations: Actor, Voice acting
- Years active: 2002–present
- Spouse: Hitisha Cheranda (m. 2018)
- Partner(s): Narayani Shastri (2004–2010); Mouni Roy (2010–2012)
- Children: 1

Gaurav Chopra (born 4 April 1979) is an Indian television actor. He is best known for starring on Uttaran and Sadda Haq as Raghuvendra Pratap Rathore and Prof Abhay Singh Ranawat respectively. He has appeared as a contestant on Bigg Boss 10. He has also acted in American film Blood Diamond, and appeared on the Georgian edition of international dance reality show Dancing with the Stars. He was last seen in ALT Balaji's web series titled Fourplay and Viu's Love Lust & Confusion.

== Education ==
Chopra studied at St. Columba's School and graduated from National Institute of Fashion Technology in 2000.

== Career ==
In 2003, Chopra appeared in the Tamil film Ottran, and in 2004 he had an appearance in the TV serial Saara Akaash and Karma – Koi Aa Rahaa Hai Waqt Badalney on Star Plus. In 2006, acted in American film Blood Diamond, he was also a contestant in the reality TV dance show Nach Baliye 2, and in 2008 he participated in the first season of another dance show, Zara Nachke Dikha. In 2006, he also acted in the Hollywood movie Blood Diamond, and played Samay Khurana on Aisa Des Hai Mera. He played the grey character of Raghuvendra Pratap Rathore on the Colors TV soap opera Uttaran, and won the Colors Golden Petal Awards-Most Dumdar Personality in the year 2012 for this role. He was seen in the gangster film Rangdari, which was released in April 2013.

In April 2016, he participated in the Georgian edition of international dance reality show Dancing with the Stars, where he was chosen as a cultural ambassador. After a sudden exit after 6 weeks, it was revealed that he left the show because of a prior commitment.

Later in 2016 he participated in the 10th season of Bigg Boss and was evicted on 1 January 2017. In 2018, he played the role of a casanova in ALT Balaji's web series, Fourplay. In May 2025, he portrayed Professor Rajveer Shastri in Sony SAB's Pushpa Impossible after a five year television hiatus.

== Personal life ==
Chopra married Hitisha Cheranda, on 19 February 2018 in a private ceremony. They became parents of a boy in 2020.

== Filmography ==
=== Television ===
Year	Show	Role
2002	Ssshhhh...Koi Hai	Vineet Singh
2004	Saara Akaash	Abhay Singh Rathore
2004	Lavanya	Sandy
2004	Ruby Duby Hub Dub	Ballu
2004	Vikraal Aur Gabraal	Vineet Singh
2004	Piya Ka Ghar	Prem
2004	Karma – Koi Aa Rahaa Hai Waqt Badalney	Gunshot
2004–2005	Dil Kya Chahta Hai	Raghuveer Shetty
2004–2005	Kabhi Haan Kabhi Naa	Kabir Jairath
2006	Aisa Des Hai Mera	Samay
2006	Nach Baliye 2	Contestant
2007–2008	Left Right Left	Captain Abhimanyu Rai Chauhan
2008	Solhah Singaarr	Shiv Chopra
2008	Ghar Ki Lakshmi Betiyann	Kapil Singhania
2008–2009	Pati Patni Aur Woh	Contestant
2009	Ssshhhh...Phir Koi Hai	Yuvraj
2010-2014	Uttaran	Raghuvendra Rathore
2010	C.I.D. - Apaharan	Vikramjeet
2011	Zor Ka Jhatka: Total Wipeout	Contestant
2011–2016	Adaalat	Vishwajeet Ranawat
2013–2016	Sadda Haq	Abhay Singh Ranawat
2015	Doli Armaano Ki	Akash Kumar
2015	Gulmohar Grand	Aniruddh Dutt
2016	Dancing with the Stars Georgia	Contestant
2016–2017	Bigg Boss 10	Contestant
2017	Savdhaan India	Host
2019	Aghori	Adhvik
2020	Sanjivani	Navratan "NV" Singh
2023	Rana Naidu	Prince Reddy
2025–2026	Pushpa Impossible	Professor Rajveer Shastri

=== Films ===
Year	Film	Role	Language
2003	Ottran	Ghazi Baba	Tamil
2006	Ghoom	Balbir	Hindi
2006	Blood Diamond	Journalist	English
2008	Humne Jeena Seekh Liya	Vijay	Hindi
2011	Men Will Be Men	Jimmy	Hindi
2022	Bachchan Pandey	Bheema	Hindi
2023	Gadar 2	Lt. Col. Devendra Rawat	Hindi
2023	Lakeerein	Vivek Agnihotri	Hindi

=== Web series ===
Year	Film	Role
2018	Fourplay	Bobby Bhushan Chawla
2018	Love Lust and Confusion	Rahil Khan
2019	Hello Mini	Aditya Grover

== Dubbing roles ==
=== Live action films ===
==== Hollywood films ====
Film title	Actor	Character	Dub Language	Original Language	Original Year Release	Dub Year Release	Notes
Thor: Ragnarok	Chris Hemsworth	Thor	Hindi	English	2017		
Avengers: Infinity War	Chris Hemsworth	Thor	Hindi	English	2018		
Avengers: Endgame	Chris Hemsworth	Thor	Hindi	English	2019		
Jungle Cruise	Dwayne Johnson	Frank Wolff	Hindi	English	2021		
Thor: Love and Thunder	Chris Hemsworth	Thor	Hindi	English	2022		
Avengers: Doomsday	Chris Hemsworth	Thor	Hindi	English	2026		

==== Indian films ====
Film title	Actor	Character	Dub Language	Original Language	Original Year Release	Dub Year Release	Notes
Roberrt	Darshan Thoogudeepa Srinivas	Roberrt, who changes his identity as Raghav after the latter's demise	Hindi	Kannada	2021	2021	
Bheemla Nayak	Pawan Kalyan	SI Bheemla Nayak	Hindi	Telugu	2022	2022	
