= Shilpa Saklani =

Indian actress

Shilpa Saklani Agnihotri
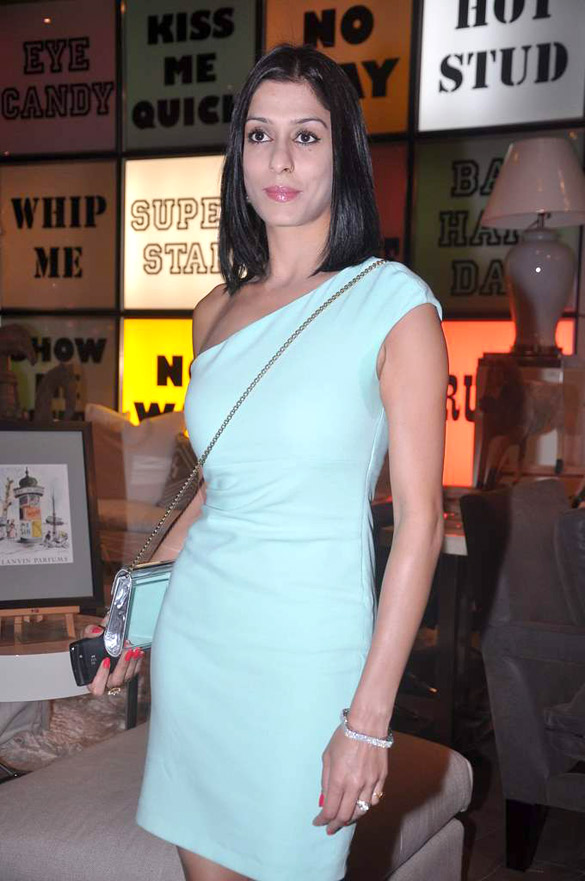
- Saklani in 2013
- Born: 5 June; Dehradun, Uttarakhand, India
- Occupations: Actor; model
- Years active: 2001–present
- Known for: Kyunki Saas Bhi Kabhi Bahu Thi; Kkusum; Vish Ya Amrit: Sitara; Shrimad Ramayan; Parineetii
- Spouse: Apurva Agnihotri (m. 2004)
- Children: 1

Shilpa Saklani Agnihotri (née Saklani; born 5 June) is an Indian actress who primarily works in Hindi television. Saklani is recognised for her portrayal of Ganga Joshi Virani in Kyunki Saas Bhi Kabhi Bahu Thi, Kkusum Deshmukh Kapoor in Kkusum, Vrinda in Vish Ya Amrit: Sitara, Kaikeyi in Shrimad Ramayan and Ambika Singhania in Parineetii.

== Career ==
Saklani started her acting career in 2001 with the Hindi film Tere Liye, where she played Ritu Malhotra opposite Arjun Punj. The film failed at the box office. From 2001 to 2022, she played Yamini in Ek Tukdaa Chaand Ka. In 2002, Saklani played Tina in the film Na Tum Jaano Na Hum.

Saklani's career marked a turning point with Kyunki Saas Bhi Kabhi Bahu Thi, where she portrayed Ganga Joshi Virani opposite Sandeep Baswana and Amit Sarin from 2002 to 2008. The series was her breakthrough and her performance earned her the ITA Award for Best Actress in a Supporting Role.

In 2003, she appeared in Kya Hadsaa Kya Haqeeqat and later in 2004, Saklani played the titular role of Lavanya in Lavanya. In 2005, she played dual roles of Kkusum Deshmukh Kapoor and Swati Gautam in Kkusum opposite Anuj Saxena. In the same year, she participated in Nach Baliye 1. Post this, she played supporting parts of Shalu in Shanno Ki Shaadi, Vidhi in Jassi Jaissi Koi Nahin, Ritu in Jyoti and Radha Kelkar in Ek Hazaaron Mein Meri Behna Hai.

From 2006 to 2007, Saklani hosted Mera Star Superstar and Fame X. Saklani then went onto participate in several reality series: Mr. & Ms. TV and Saas v/s Bahu both in 2008, Pati Patni Aur Woh in 2009, Meethi Choori No 1 in 2010, Survivor India – The Ultimate Battle in 2012 and Welcome – Baazi Mehmaan Nawazi Ki in 2013.

Later in 2013, Saklani participated in the reality series Bigg Boss 7, where she finished at 16th place. From 2015 to 2016, she participated in Power Couple. Additionally, she appeared in episodes of Haunted Nights, Yeh Hai Aashiqui, Savdhaan India, Pyaar Tune Kya Kiya, Code Red and Darr Sabko Lagta Hai. In 2015, she played Nandini Pandey in Dosti... Yaariyan... Manmarziyan.

After a three year hiatus, Saklani returned to television in 2018, with Mahakali – Anth Hi Aarambh Hai, where she played Diti. In the same year, she played Roma Kapoor in Kaleerein. From 2018 to 2019, she played a vishkanya Vrinda opposite Sandeep Baswana in Vish Ya Amrit: Sitara. Following a small hiatus, she appeared in Tere Ishq Mein Ghayal, in 2023 as Sudha.

In January 2024, Saklani is portraying Kaikeyi in Shrimad Ramayan. From June 2024 to May 2025, she played Ambika Singhania in Parineetii.

== Personal life ==
Saklani married actor Apurva Agnihotri on 29 June 2004 in Dehradun. Saklani gave birth to their daughter on 13 October 2022, 18 years after their marriage.

== Filmography ==
=== Films ===
Year	Title	Role	Notes	Ref.
2001	Tere Liye	Ritu Malhotra		
2002	Na Tum Jaano Na Hum	Tina		
2015	Ab Rab Hawale - An Untold Story Of A Known Irony	Daljeet	Short film	

=== Television ===
Year	Title	Role	Notes	Ref.
2001–2002	Ek Tukdaa Chaand Ka	Yamini		
2002–2008	Kyunki Saas Bhi Kabhi Bahu Thi	Ganga Joshi Virani		
2003	Kya Hadsaa Kya Haqeeqat	Pooja		
2004	Kya Hadsaa Kya Haqeeqat	Tanu / Rachel D'Mello		
2004	Lavanya	Lavanya		
2005	Kkusum	Kkusum Deshmukh Kapoor / Swati Gautam		
2005	Nach Baliye 1	Contestant	6th place	
2005–2006	Shanno Ki Shaadi	Shalu		
2006	Jassi Jaissi Koi Nahin	Vidhi		
2006–2007	Mera Star Superstar	Host		
2006–2007	Fame X	Host		
2008	Mr. & Ms. TV	Contestant		
2008	Saas v/s Bahu	Contestant		
2009	Pati Patni Aur Woh	Contestant		
2010	Meethi Choori No 1	Contestant		
2010	Jyoti	Ritu		
2012	Ek Hazaaron Mein Meri Behna Hai	Radha Kelkar		
2012	Survivor India – The Ultimate Battle	Contestant	18th place	
2012	Haunted Nights	Shilpa		
2013	Welcome – Baazi Mehmaan Nawazi Ki	Contestant		
2013	Bigg Boss 7	Contestant	16th place	
2014	Yeh Hai Aashiqui	Aditi		
2014	Savdhaan India	Sonali Rane		
2015	Pyaar Tune Kya Kiya	Aparna	season 3	
2015	Code Red	Ganga		
2015	Dosti... Yaariyan... Manmarziyan	Nandini Pandey		
2015	Darr Sabko Lagta Hai	Dr. Shehnaz Mistry		
2015–2016	Power Couple	Contestant	7th place	
2017	Chandrakanta — Ek Mayavi Prem Gaatha	Ratnaprabha Jai Singh		
2018	Mahakali – Anth Hi Aarambh Hai	Diti		
2018	Kaleerein	Roma Kapoor		
2018–2019	Vish Ya Amrit: Sitara	Vrinda		
2023	Tere Ishq Mein Ghayal	Sudha		
2024	Shrimad Ramayan	Kaikeyi		
2024–2025	Parineetii	Ambika Singhania		

== Awards and nominations ==
Year	Award	Category	Work	Result	Ref.
2005	Indian Television Academy Awards	Best Actress in a Supporting Role	Kyunki Saas Bhi Kabhi Bahu Thi	Won	
2015	Los Angeles Independent Film Festival	Best Ensemble Cast	Ab Rab Hawale	Nominated	
2025	Indian Telly Awards	Best Actress in a Supporting Role	Shrimad Ramayan	Nominated	

== See also ==
- List of Indian television actresses
- List of Hindi television actresses
