= Kkoi Dil Mein Hai =

- Created by: Ekta Kapoor
- Written by: Anil Nagpal; Dheeraj Sarna
- Directed by: Anil V Kumar, Rajeev Khandelwal, Ravindra Gautam, Manesh Om Singhania
- Creative directors: Vanita Jain; Nim Sood
- Starring: see below
- Music by: Jai Walia
- Opening theme: "Kkoi Dil Mein Hai" by Shreya Ghoshal & Sunidhi Chauhan
- Country of origin: India
- No. of seasons: 1
- No. of episodes: 60

Production
- Producers: Ekta Kapoor; Shobha Kapoor
- Running time: approx. 24 minutes
- Production company: Balaji Telefilms

Original release
- Network: Sony TV
- Release: 21 December 2003 – 24 February 2005

Kkoi Dil Mein Hai(transl. Someone Is In My Heart) is an Indian television romantic comedy series that aired on Sony TV. The series premiered in December 2003 and ended its run in 2005. The show starred Eijaz Khan and Poorva Gokhale in lead roles. The opening theme song was sung as a duet by famous singers Shreya Ghoshal and Sunidhi Chauhan. The show garnered some controversy for featuring a scene of marital rape.

== Plot ==
Kajal (Poorva Gokhale) is a simple and bubbly girl from a Gujarati family and best friend of the rich and narcissistic Krutika. Their friendship hits rock bottom when they both fall for rich and handsome Samay (Sandeep Baswana), the heir of the Punj business empire. Samay reciprocates Kajal's feelings and they plan to get married. A jealous and deranged Krutika orchestrates a kidnapping and blackmail plot with help of her mother and gets Kajal forcefully married to Samay's younger playboy brother Arjun (Eijaz Khan) and herself marries Samay by duping him. Arjun gradually starts falling deeply in love with Kajal and gives up his wild lifestyle. Kajal reluctant at first also falls in love with Arjun. Things get complicated as Samay, still in love with Kajal turns to alcohol to drown his sorrow and hates Krutika, even refusing to recognize her as his wife. A still deranged Krutika blaming Kajal for her miseries tries to complicate her life. Arjun and Kajal meanwhile have a successful marriage and Kajal gets pregnant and gives birth to their son. Krutika hires Sahil (Arjun's lookalike) to be with Kajal as Arjun. In the last episode Sahil goes to Kajal's mother to ask what really happened between Kajal and Krutika. Kajal's mother tells him the whole story. Sahil tells Krutika's plan in front of Punj family. Krutika gets arrested and Kajal forgives Sahil saying she always knew, she just played along so that she can know why he is acting to be Arjun. The serial ends with Kajal putting garland on Arjun's photo saying that she has only Armaan now but Samay tells her that he is also with her and they hug.

== Cast ==
- Poorva Gokhale as Kajal Arjun Punj (née Agarwal) - Eldest vivacious daughter of Agarwal family
- Amit Sadh / Eijaz Khan as Arjun Punj - Younger son of Punj family and Kajal's husband
- Sandeep Baswana / Hiten Tejwani as Samay Punj - Kajal's ex flame and Krutika's ex-husband
- Karishma Tanna as Krutika - Samay's obsessive ex-wife and childhood friend of Kajal
- Jennifer Winget as Preeti Agarwal - Kajal's docile younger sister
- Kiran Juneja as Neetu Punj - Samay and Arjun's Mother
- Suchitra Pillai as Anjana: Neetu's younger sister; Samay and Arjun's maternal aunt
- Salim Shah as Manmeet Punj - Samay and Arjun's Father
- Eijaz Khan as Sahil - Lookalike of Arjun Punj
- Natasha Rana as Malini: Krutika's Mother
- Seema Pahwa as Kajal's Mother
- Prabhat Bhattacharya / Vishal Puri as Raj Punj: Manmeet's younger brother; Samay and Arjun's paternal uncle
- Siddharth Choudhary as Kushal Rai: An industrialist; Arjun's best friend and murderer; Kajal's former boss
