= Tujh Sang Preet Lagai Sajna (2008 TV series) =

2008 Star Plus drama

- Genre: Soap opera Romance
- Created by: Ekta Kapoor
- Developed by: Ekta Kapoor
- Written by: Dheeraj Sarna; Deepti Rawal; Vinod Sharma
- Screenplay by: Vipul Mehtae; Anil Nagpal; Mahesh Pandey; Manish Paliwal; Garima Goyal
- Story by: Sonali Jaffar; Mahesh Pandey; Manish Paliwal
- Directed by: Talat Jani; Lalit Mohan; Qaeed Kuwajerwala; Sangieta Rao; Rishi Tyagi; Ajay Vermal; Mahesh Pandey; Fahad Kashmiri; Sachin Kannan; Irfan Shaikh; Anoop Chaudhary; V.G Roy
- Creative directors: Suraj Rao; Nivedita Basu; Neeshi Oza; Vikas Gupta; Mahesh Pandey
- Starring: Puja Banerjee; Varun Kapoor; Sandeep Baswana; Kunal Verma; Leena Jumani; Aditi Bhatia; Dimpy Ganguli; Abigail Jain
- Opening theme: "Tujh Sang Preet Lagai Sajna" by Pamela Jain
- Country of origin: India
- Original language: Hindi
- No. of episodes: 295

Production
- Producers: Ekta Kapoor; Shobha Kapoor
- Cinematography: Deepak Malwankar; Suhas Rao; Sanjay Memane
- Editors: Vikas Sharma; Vishal Sharma; Manas Majumdar
- Running time: 25 minutes

Original release
- Network: Star Plus
- Release: 3 November 2008 – 5 February 2010

Tujh Sang Preet Lagai Sajna (translation: I've Loved You, Sweetheart) is an Indian soap opera broadcast on Star Plus channel. Produced by Balaji Telefilms, the series premiered on 3 November 2008 and ended on 5 February 2010.

== Story ==
Balwant and Vikramaditya used to be best friends despite the fact that the latter was a land owner and the former was a farmer.

Their friendship was an example for everyone and they were inseparable until one horrible day. Balwant's daughter Simran was supposed to marry Vikramaditya's son Sumer. But it turned out that Sumer was already married (and had a son with his wife Bindya). Sumer hadn't told anyone.

On the day of his proposed marriage to Simran, Sumer runs away to get Bindiya and tells Vikramaditya everything. Simran follows Sumer to tell him that she respects his decision and she does not want to marry him if he is already married. Simran is heartbroken as she has loved Sumer since her childhood but she swallows her pain in order to make him happy.

Balwant and Vikramaditya reach the train station, where Simran and Sumer are standing. A car runs over Simran. In a fit of rage Balwant's son Kuldeep shoots Sumer. Kuldeep goes to jail and the families become sworn enemies. Kaliganj (the village where they live) gets divided into two parts (Pratapgarh - Kishanganj) and separated by a border which no one can cross. One either belongs to Kishanganj (Vikramaditya's village) or Pratapgarh (Balwant's village).

Sumer's son Yug (one year old at the time) is sent to London to study and stay away from the enmity in the village. Kuldeep's daughter Vrinda (born on the day of the shoot-out) is considered unlucky in the family by everyone except Balwant, as her father (Kuldeep) went to jail and her aunt (Simran) died the day she was born.

=== 20 years later ===
This led to Yug and Vrinda—two people whose families are sworn enemies—to fall in love. After several unpleasant encounters, they fall deeply in love. Yug and Vrinda can't live without one another, and they plan to marry. That is when they find out about their families hating each other. They decide to get rid of the enmity by reminding Balwant and Vikramaditya how they used to be such great friends. When that does not work, Yug comes to live at Vrinda's house pretending to be the best friend of Vrinda's cousin Teji. Nobody in the family, except for Vrinda and Teji, knows who Yug really is. He wins everyone's hearts and the family decides to get Yug and Vrinda married. That's when Balwant finds out who Yug really is. Yug and Vrinda run away. But they do not marry each other and come back within a day. They tell their families that they could have married if they wanted, and no one would have been able to do anything. They didn't because they truly love each other and want their marriage to happen with everyone's blessings. Balwant and Vikramaditya are untouched and they drag Yug and Vrinda home. Before leaving Yug says to Balwant, "Vrinda meri amanat hai, jisse mein aapke paas chodke ja raha hoon. Par mein usse lene jaldi aonga." (I am leaving Vrinda with you for a short while and I will come back to get her as she is only mine.)

This makes Balwant and Vikramaditya furious. They meet and make a plan to get Vrinda married to someone else in another village. But they tell Vrinda that she will marry Yug. Meanwhile, Vikramaditya sends Yug out on a business trip to London. Vrinda marries Rajbeer, who does not know about this plan. Yug finds out what happened and does not know what to do.

On the first night of marriage, Vrinda tells Rajbeer everything about her and Yug's love and their family's betrayal. She tells him that she thought she was marrying Yug and she cannot live with anyone else. Rajbeer (heartbroken) tells Vrinda that his grandmother is very ill and will only live about six months more. If Vrinda leaves Rajbeer, his grandmother will die right away. Vrinda agrees to stay in the house as Rajbeer's wife until his grandmother dies. Rajbeer promises that after six months, he will hand her over to Yug.

During these 6 months Vrinda and Rajbeer fall in love. But they do not admit it to each other because Rajbeer thinks Vrinda still loves Yug. She thinks that Rajbeer thinks of her only as a friend. On the day that his grandmother dies, Rajbeer gives Vrinda to Yug. But Yug tells them both that they belong together, as he used to see Vrinda's eyes filled with love for him but that love is now for Rajbeer and he does not want to get in the way of their happiness. Vrinda thanks Yug and leaves with Rajbeer. Seeing that they tore their children apart, Balwant and Vikramaditya end their enmity and become best friends again. Yug still loves Vrinda deeply but marries Bharti byn his grandfather's wishes. Yug tells Bharti that they will only stay friends as he will always love Vrinda. Yug had told Bharti all this before marriage but she wanted to marry him anyway because she loved him a lot.

At first it is shown that Bharti is a really sweet and beautiful girl who loves Yug deeply even though she knows about him and Vrinda. It is later revealed that Bharti is extremely jealous of Vrinda. Bharti is plotting to ruin Vrinda's life.

Vrinda gets pregnant and Bharti convinces Rajbeer that the child belongs to Yug, by showing him some pictures that show Vrinda and Yug embracing. (The pictures were taken when Yug was consoling Vrinda). The baby dies at the age of only one month in a kidnapping attempt. Vrinda is devastated and Rajbeer is furious. He thinks Yug is the cause of everything. He thinks Yug and Vrinda are having an affair. Rajbeer declares enmity with Yug and says that if Vrinda keeps any relation with Yug, he will consider her dead. Vrinda, who loves Rajbeer a lot, agrees to not keep any relation with Yug.

Two months later, Vrinda gets pregnant for a second time. As Vrinda returns from the clinic, she is nearly hit by a truck and is saved by Yug. Rajbeer comes at that moment and he sees Vrinda in Yug's arms. He thinks that Vrinda has still been meeting Yug and that this child, too, belongs to Yug and not him. He kicks Vrinda out of the house.

Yug tries to explain things to Rajbeer but that does not work so he goes to Vrinda (who is at the train station) to apologise. But Vrinda screams at Yug saying that every time Yug comes into her life, something goes wrong and if he wants to see Vrinda happy he should never show his face to her again.

Yug goes home, heartbroken, and he hears Bharti talking on the phone. He finds out how she was the one who showed Rajbeer the pics and ruined Vrinda's life and Yug gets furious. He confronts Bharti and screams at her saying there is so much difference between her and Vrinda, because Vrinda thinks about everyone else and Bharti only thinks about herself. Bharti screams at Yug saying that she did everything because she loved him. She wanted Yug to notice her but all he thought about was Vrinda. They divorce each other and Bharti goes away from everyone's life. The show takes an eight-year leap.

=== Eight years later ===
Rajbeer is now a huge business man like Yug used to be. Yug is nearly on the street because he refuses to do any business. Yug holds himself responsible for ruining Vrinda's life and wants to die as soon as possible. Rajbeer wants to ruin Yug financially and it seems to be working until Virnda comes back into their lives with her 8-year-old daughter, named Tulsi. Vrinda tells Yug that he had nothing to do with ruining her life, in fact he was the only one who stood by her. Relieved from his guilt, Yug goes back into business and gets back on top.

Rajbeer finds Vrinda and makes a deal with her. If she supports him with a court case (Vrinda is the eye witness and her statement could make Rajbeer's nephew go to jail) he will let her live with him as his wife. Vrinda agrees. Initially Rajbeer hates Vrinda and tries to do everything that he could to make her life miserable but he starts to soften up slowly. Tulsi, with the help of her "Yug uncle" brings her parents close together. But Rajbeer finds out about this and he yells at Tulsi saying that Yug is her father not him. Tulsi is hurt but Yug explains to her that her dad is just angry and they have to pacify him. But Tulsi starts crying and asks why Rajbeer does not accept her as his daughter and why did he tell her that Yug was her dad. Vrinda hears this whole conversation, and she is heartbroken that Rajbeer hurt her daughter. She decides she can't live with someone who hates her daughter so much so she decides to leave Rajbeer's house and she moves into an indian colony.

At first Vrinda is happy living in the colony, but then some of the gossipy women of the colony start taunting Vrinda. They say that she has a daughter but no husband and that Tulsi is probably an illegitimate child, and that's why her dad does not come to see her. Vrinda is hurt by these comments and Tulsi is visibly disturbed by them. Vrinda decides that she will remarry so that no one will taunt Tulsi again. Vrinda asks Yug to marry her. Yug, still in love with Vrinda, says yes. Rajbeer finds out about the marriage and although he is insanely jealous he acts as if he does not care.

After a series of drama and misunderstandings, on the day of Yug and Vrinda's wedding, Rajbeer finally finds out the truth about what Bharti did, and how Vrinda was never unfaithful to him. He goes to the temple where Yug and Vrinda are getting married and begs for Vrinda's forgiveness and asks her to come back to him. Vrinda has forgiven Rajbeer and wants to go back to him, but she does not say anything as she does not want to betray Yug (who accepted her and stood by her when no one else would). Rajbeer takes Vrinda's silence as her way of rejecting him and he is just about to leave when Yug stops him. Yug says that although Vrinda will not say anything to him, he loves her so much that he can even read her silence and he can always tell what she is thinking and what she wants. He puts Vrinda's hand in Rajbeer's, symbolizing that they will always be together. Rajbeer welcomes Vrinda back into his house (with a clear heart), and apologises to Yug. Yug and Rajbeer become best friends again and they join their companies and start doing business together. Yug becomes the huge business tycoon that he used to be again and life seems perfect. The sacred veil of the goddess in the temple flows over Yug and the girl as they stare in to each other's eyes. (This was exactly how Yug and Vrinda met for the first time.) Then they snap out of their eye lock and stand up straight. The girl introduces herself as Radha and Yug, mesmerised by her beauty (this is the first time Yug is mesmerised by anyone other than Vrinda) offers to drop her home. Radha accepts Yug's offer and gets into his car. While entering the car, Radha almost falls and Yug catches her. The show ends with Radha in Yug's arms, indicating that this is the start of a new love story.

As the credits roll, Rajbeer and Vrinda are shown playing with two more kids. Yug and Radha are shown getting married and then cradling their newborn son in their arms.

== Cast and characters ==
- Puja Banerjee - Vrinda (married to Rajbeer; used to love Yug)
- Sandeep Baswana - Rajbeer (married to Vrinda)
- Kunal Verma - Yugandhar (married to Bharti; used to love Vrinda; now married to and loves Radha)
- Leena Jumani- Radha (loves and married to Yug; only shown in the last episode of the show)
- Yasir Shah - Siddharth ( Guest Appearance )
- Khushboo Singh - Bharti (used to be married to Yug; hates Vrinda)
- Aditi Bhatia - Tulsi (daughter of Vrinda and Rajbeer)
- Ananya Agarwal - Prerna (Babli's daughter, i.e. Rajbeer's niece)
- Chetan Pandit - Vikramaditya (Yug's paternal grandfather)
- Gautam Gulati - Teji (Radhika and Kushal's son; Vrinda's cousin)
- Sudhir Pandey - Balwant (Vrinda, Pooja, and Teji's paternal grandfather)
- Mayank Gandhi - Ashish (Gayatri's son; married to Babli; loves Bhumika; Yug's cousin)
- Garima Bhatnagar - Babli (married to Ashish; Rajbir's sister)
- Chahat Khanna - Frieda (married to Teji)
- Mihika Verma - Bhumika (loves Ashish; wants to marry him as soon as his plan is over)
- Abigail Jain - Geetika (Vrinda's friend)
- Papiya Sengupta - Parminder(married to Kuldeep; daughter in law of Balwant and; Vrinda's mom)
- Kanika Shivpuri - Preeto (married to Balwant;Vrinda, Pooja, and Teji's paternal grandmother)
- Deepak Qazir - Girdhari Kaka (Balwant and Vikramaditya's friend)
- Bindiya - (Yug's mother; widow)
- Kushal - (Pooja and Teji's dad; Radhika's husband; Balwant and Preeto's son; Vrinda's chachu)
- Gayatri - (Ashish and Neil's mother, Yug's bhua, Vikram Aditya's daughter; Babli's mother in law)
- Varun Kapoor -Neil (Gayatri's son; Ashish's brother; Yug's cousin)
- Karamveer - (Rajbir's brother, married to Sushma)
- Sushma - (Karamveer's wife; Rajbir's sister in law)
- Amma - (Sushma's mother; Karamveer's mother in law)
- Dimpy Ganguli as Dipika
- Rucha Hasabnis Jagdale as Rashmi
- Hina Khan as Akshara
- Ragini Khanna as Suhana
- Pooja Gor as Pratigya

== Production ==
=== Premiere ===
In the final episode aired on 9 October 2008, the protagonist of Kahaani Ghar Ghar Kii, Sakshi Tanwar was shown passing the baton to Puja Banerjee, the lead actress of the show. The series premiered on 3 November 2008 replacing Kahanii Ghar Ghar Kii at a prime slot 10:00 pm (IST) on Star Plus.

Within few days of its premiere, the shootings and telecast of all the Hindi television series including this series and films were stalled on 8 November 2008 due to dispute by the technician workers of FWICE (Federation of Western India Cine Employees) for increasing the wages, better work conditions and more breaks between shootings. FWICE first took a strike on 1 October 2008 when they addressed their problems with the producers and production was stalled. A contract was signed after four days discussions and shooting were happening only for two hours content in a day then after which differences increased between them while channels gave them time until 30 October 2008 to sort it out. Failing to do so lead to protests again from 10 November 2008 to 19 November 2008 during which channels blacked out new broadcasts and repeat telecasts were shown from 10 November 2008. On 19 November 2008, the strike was called off after settling the disputes and the production resumed. The new episodes started to telecast from 1 December 2008.

=== Ratings & Telecast ===
Owing its average ratings since its inception, the series was given notice twice by the channel as of March 2009 and time until May 2009 IPL to improve its ratings. As it did not improve, it was moved to the afternoon slot in May 2009. Despite, it did not perform as expected and went off air on 5 February 2010.

== Songs ==
No.	Title	Length
1.	"Tujh Sang Preet Lagai Sajna"	2.20
2.	"Ab Toh Sahi Na Jaaye Yeh Dooriyaan"	3.05
3.	"Happy Family Bg Tune"	2.07
