= Eijaz Khan =

Indian television actor

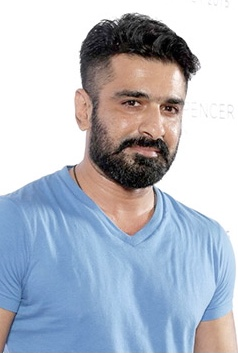
- Khan in 2022
- Born: Eijaz Khan
- Other name: Gabbar
- Citizenship: Indian
- Education: University of Mumbai
- Occupations: Actor; TV host; model
- Years active: 1999–present
- Notable work: Jawan (film); Bigg Boss 14
- Relatives: Satar Khan (Father); Shaheen (Mother)

Eijaz Khan is an Indian film and television actor. He rose to fame by playing the lead roles in Balaji Telefilms serials Kkavyanjali, and Kyaa Hoga Nimmo Kaa. He appeared in Sony's Yeh Moh Moh Ke Dhaagey, Halala and City of Dreams.

== Early life ==
Khan has two siblings, a younger brother and sister. By the time he was three-years old, his parents had separated. He and his brother lived with their father in Mumbai while, his mother and sister lived in Hyderabad. His mother died in 1991, and it was after this that he finally met his sister who was 13 years old at the time. He attended Our Lady of Perpetual Succour High School in Chembur, Mumbai, and Datta Meghe College of Engineering where he obtained his civil engineering degree.

== Filmography ==
- Note: All works are in Hindi, unless otherwise noted.

=== Films ===
Year	Title	Role	Notes
1999	Thakshak		
2002	Maine Dil Tujhko Diya	Eijaz	
2003	Zameen	Dancer	Special appearance in the song "Dilli ki Sardi"
2003	Kuch Naa Kaho	Vikram	
2007	Just Married	Abhay's Friend	Guest appearance
2008	Meerabai Not Out	Dr. Arjun Awasthi	
2011	Tanu Weds Manu	Jassi Gill	
2011	Dhada	Amit	Telugu film
2013	Zilla Ghaziabad	Ombir Singh	
2014	Lucky Kabootar	Lucky	
2015	Tanu Weds Manu Returns	Jassi Gill	
2016	Shorgul	Mustaqeem	
2019	Upstarts	Rocky Saxena	
2023	Jawan	Manish Gaekwad	
2024	Zabt	Uday Singhaniya	
2025	Dhoom Dhaam	Sathe	
2025	120 Bahadur	Lieutenant colonel (later Colonel) H.S. Dhingra	

=== Television ===
Year	Serial	Role
2003–2004	Kahiin To Hoga	Varun Raheja
2004	Kkusum	Varun Raheja
2004	Kkoi Dil Mein Hai	Arjun Punj
2005	Kkoi Dil Mein Hai	Sahil
2004; 2006	Kyunki Saas Bhi Kabhi Bahu Thi	Zuber Khan
2004–2005	Kesar	Abhinav Pandey
2004–2005	Kkusum	Advocate Sohan Kapoor
2005–2006	Kkavyanjali	Kavya Nanda
2006	Kkavyanjali	Dr. Soham Saxena
2006–2007	Kyaa Hoga Nimmo Kaa	Kunal Sehgal
2007	Kasamh Se	Anupam Kapadia
2007	Kayamath	Varun Bhatia
2007–2008	Bhabhi	Sohan
2009	Dance Premier League	Host
2009	Ssshhhh... Phir Koi Hai – Nishaan	Virat Sanyal
2009	Bhaskar Bharti	Bhaskar
2010	Saas Bina Sasural	Guest
2011	Adaalat	Anurag Sirohi / Virat
2012–2016	CID	Various characters
2012	Shubh Vivah	Amrit Nigam
2012	Shubh Vivah	Manthan
2013	Diya Aur Baati Hum	Abhimanyu Singh
2013	Punar Vivah – Ek Nayi Umeed	Vikrant Suryavanshi
2013	Jhalak Dikhhla Jaa 6	Contestant (withdrew)
2014	Encounter	Inspector Ali Rizvi (Episode 7 to Episode 9)
2014–2015	Laut Aao Trisha	A.C.P. Kabir Rana
2015	Rishton Ka Mela	Inspector Hooda
2015	Dafa 420	Himself
2016	Meri Awaaz Hi Pehchaan Hai	Vikrant Khanna
2017	Yeh Moh Moh Ke Dhaagey	Raidhan Katara / Mukhi
2019–2020	Tara From Satara	Shatrughna Mehra
2020–2021	Bigg Boss 14	Contestant
2026–present	Dilo Ki Ram Leela	Veerendra Sehgal

=== Web series ===
Year	Show	Role	Notes
2019	Halala	Zaid	
2019	Bhram	Pradeep Choudhary	
2019	City of dreams	SI Wasim khan	
2020	Kashmakash – Kya Sahi Kya Galat – Chat Talk	Inspector Devdutt	
2021	City of Dreams 2	SI Wasim khan	
2023	City of Dreams (S3)	SI Wasim khan	
2024	Adrishyam – The Invisible Heroes	Agent/Ravi Verma	
2025	Adrishyam 2 - The Invisible Heroes	Agent/Ravi verma	

=== Music videos ===
Year	Album	Song	Singer	Ref
2002	DJ Doll - Kaanta Laga Remix	Leena Ho Leena (Medley) - Leena Ho Leena, Ye Kahan, Tum Aa Gaya, Chhookar, Khatooba Remix	DJ Doll	
2003	DJ Hot Remix Vol.1	Kehdoon Tumhayn	DJ Hot	
2003	Dance Masti	Piya Tu Ab Toh Aaja (Medley) - Piya Tu Ab To Aaja, Dum Maaro Dum Mit Jaye Hum, Haaye Re Haaye Tera Ghoongtha, Do Ghoont Mujhe Bhi Phila De, Chura Liya Hai Remix	Asha Bhosle, Rahul Dev Burman	
2003	Aisa Jadoo Remix	Ho Gaya Mujhe Pyaar Remix	DJ Hot	

=== Dubbing roles ===
Film title	Actor	Character	Dub language	Original language	Original release year	Dub release year	Notes
Viswasam	Ajith Kumar	Thookku Durai (Jai Veera in Hindi version)	Hindi	Tamil	2019	2022	
Varisu	R. Sarathkumar	Rajendran Palanisamy	Hindi	Tamil	2023	2023	
Thunivu	Ajith Kumar	Dark Devil	Hindi	Tamil	2023	2023	
Ruler	Nandamuri Balakrishna	Dharma / Arjun Prasad	Hindi	Telugu	2019	2023	
Leo	Arjun Sarja	Harold Das	Hindi	Tamil	2023	2023	
Jigarthanda DoubleX	Raghava Lawrence	Pandiyan	Hindi	Tamil	2023	2023	
Maharshi	Jagapathi Babu	Vivek Mittal	Hindi	Telugu	2019	2024	
Agent	Dino Morea	Dharma alias "The God"	Hindi	Telugu	2023	2024	
Uppena	Vijay Sethupathi	Kotagiri Sesha Raayanam	Hindi	Telugu	2021	2025	
Rangasthalam	Jagapathi Babu	President Phanindra Bhupathi	Hindi	Telugu	2018	2025	
Kadaram Kondan	Vikram	KK	Hindi	Tamil	2019	2025	

== Awards ==
=== Indian Telly Awards ===
- 2005 - Best Onscreen Couple with Anita Hassanandani
