= Karam Apnaa Apnaa =

- Genre: Soap opera Romance
- Created by: Ekta Kapoor
- Developed by: Ekta Kapoor
- Written by: Dialogue: Deepti Rawal
- Screenplay by: Anirudh Pathak; Manish Paliwal; Mahesh Pandey
- Story by: Mahesh Pandey; Manish Paliwal
- Directed by: Santram Varma; Anil V. Kumar; Ravindra Gautam; Sangeeta Rao; Satish Kashyap; Anoop Chaudhary; Vivek Kumar; V.G Roy
- Creative directors: Nivedita Basu; Doris Dey; Ipshita Deb
- Starring: See Below
- Opening theme: Karam Apnaa Apnaa by Priya Bhattacharya
- Country of origin: India
- Original language: Hindi
- No. of episodes: 603

Production
- Producers: Ekta Kapoor; Shobha Kapoor
- Cinematography: Sanjay Malwankar; Suhas Rao
- Editors: Vikas Sharma; Mohamed Salim
- Running time: 24 minutes
- Production company: Balaji Telefilms

Original release
- Network: StarPlus
- Release: 29 August 2006 – 27 March 2009

Karam Apnaa Apnaa (transl. Everyone's Fate Is Their Own) is an Indian soap opera which aired on StarPlus from 29 August 2006 to 27 March 2009. It was produced by Ekta Kapoor's Balaji Telefilms. It starred Sumeet Sachdev, Pallavi Subash, Muhammad Iqbal Khan, Yash Tonk and Sanyogita Maheshwari as Kamya.

== Plot ==
Gauri Chatterjee is a charming and innocent middle-class Bengali girl who lives with her family. Her father Alok's best friend and wealthy businessman Mahen Kapoor and his wife Nikhila dote on Gauri who is motherless. Mahen finds a good match for Gauri, Shashank. However, on the day of her wedding, Gauri is told that Shashank has refused to marry her and the Kapoors have forced Shiv to stand in as the bridegroom. She runs away from the venue but is convinced by an understanding stranger, Anupam, to face her problem. She returns and Shiv is forced to marry her. Over time, Gauri falls in love with Shiv without expecting anything in return and Shiv becomes friendly to her.

After the marriage, Gauri is in a series of mishaps. It is revealed that Shiv's horoscope has a major flaw according to which his first wife will die soon. Nikhila was aware of this and had made Shiv marry Gauri. Shiv has been in love with his childhood friend Ipshita and wanted to save her from the effects of his horoscope. Gauri refuses to abandon Shiv. She meets with an accident but survives. Meanwhile, Ipshita gets engaged to Anupam as camouflage. However, after Gauri's accident, Shiv consummates their marriage and refuses to leave Gauri, who is now pregnant.

=== 5 years later ===
Shiv and Gauri have three children, twin sons - Om and Priam and a daughter, Shanti. While Gauri is busy with the kids, Shiv sometimes misses Ipshita who is now a famous writer and has separated from Anupam. Nikhila wants Ipshita back in Shiv's life. Shiv's long-lost twin brother, Samar, is found. Nikhila, Ipshita and Mahen's sister, Maya join hands against Gauri. Ipshita takes advantage of Shiv's emotional vulnerability and has a one-night stand with him. Gauri exposes Nikhila's evil plans. Nikhila is thrown out of the Kapoor family. Nikhila, Ipshita and Maya, with the help of doctors, fake a report that Gauri has a brain tumor. Gauri learns about Shiv's one-night stand, after which Ipshita is apparently pregnant. Expecting an early death for herself, Gauri forces Shiv to marry Ipshita. However, Gauri realizes that she has been tricked and, with Samar's help, exposes Ipshita's true colors. Shiv throws Ipshita out of the house.

Meanwhile, Nikhila has a change of heart and re-enters the Kapoor family. Mahen's nephews, Moksh and Asim enter the Kapoor mansion, accompanied by Shashank, their business associate. Shiv is brutally murdered by Moksh, Asim and Shashank. After his death, they harass the Kapoors. Samar encounters Shiv's ghost which tells him about Shiv's murder. Samar promises to take revenge. Samar and Gauri get Moksh and Asim convicted for Shiv's murder, but Shashank escapes. Shiv's ghost also disappears after this. The Kapoors start pressuring Samar to marry Gauri. However, Samar and Gauri reject the idea. Nikhila is murdered. Samar and Gauri suspect each other. Gauri runs away and is assumed to be dead.

=== 5 years later ===
Samar has turned into a cold-hearted business tycoon, and Gauri, who has lost her memory, is living in another town as Shivangi. Samar hates Gauri whom he believes to be his mother's killer. Anupam is now paralyzed, as Ipshita had tried to kill him to be with Shiv. His sister, Nisha wants to take revenge against the Kapoors. She traps Samar into getting engaged to her. Gauri regains her memory and becomes aware of Nisha's true intentions. On Samar's wedding day, Gauri replaces Nisha as the veiled bride. Samar is furious when he learns that he has been tricked into marrying Gauri. They constantly fight.

Eventually, it is revealed that Nikhila's killer was Maya. Samar and Gauri work out their differences and their love blossoms. Gauri's old friend Prateek, a doctor, diagnoses that Samar is suffering from a tumor. Prateek treats Samar and cures the tumor.

Samar's cousins, Vivaan and Dhruv, want to take over the wealth of the Kapoor family. Gauri and Samar are forced to migrate to Kolkata with their three children. They lead a modest life until a spoilt rich girl named Kamya falls in love with Samar. Kamya and her mother poison Samar's mind and make him believe that Gauri is having an affair. Gauri is pregnant with Samar's baby but he begins to suspect that her supposed lover has fathered the child. Gauri decides to separate from Samar but Kamya's truth is exposed. Gauri gives birth to a baby girl. After some time, Samar and Gauri move to London in order to establish their business. Dhruv and Vivaan are fighting each other for the Kapoor inheritance. At last, Samar and Gauri return to India and solve the problem. The Kapoor family is re-united.

== Cast ==
- Pallavi Subhash as Gauri Chatterjee Kapoor – Alok's elder daughter; Kaya's sister; Shiv's widow; Samar's wife; Om, Priam and Shanti's mother (2006–2009)
- Yash Tonk as
  - Shiv Kapoor – Mahen and Nikhila's elder son; Samar and Palak's brother; Ipshita's ex-fiancé; Gauri's late husband; Om, Priam and Shanti's father (2006–2007) (Dead)
    - Mohammed Iqbal Khan as Shiv Kapoor (Earlier) (2006)
  - Samar Kapoor – Mahen and Nikhila's younger son; Shiv and Palak's twin brother; Gauri's second husband; Om, Priam and Shanti's adoptive father (2007–2009)
- Sumeet Sachdev as Shashank Bose – Shiv's murderer; Kaya's abusive divorced husband; Dhaani's father (2006–2008) (antagonist)
- Shaika Parween as Kaya Chatterjee Bose – Alok's younger daughter; Gauri's sister; Shashank's wife; Dhaani's mother (2006–2008)
- Sandeep Baswana as Dr. Prateek – Gauri's childhood friend; Samar's doctor; Aarti's husband (2008–2009)
- Karan Patel / Mayank Sharma as Vivan Kapoor – Shyala's son; Dhruv's brother; Shiv, Samar and Palak's cousin; Kaya's fiancé; Aastha's husband (2006–2009)
- Vaishnavi Dhanraj as Aastha Kapoor – Vivan's wife (2007–2009)
- Anurag Nigam as Dhruv Kapoor – Shyala's son; Vivan's brother; Shiv, Samar and Palak's cousin; Gayatri's husband (2006–2009)
- Pallavi Subhash Chandran as Gayatri Kapoor – Dhruv's wife (2007–2009)
- Ayush Khedekar as Om Kapoor – Gauri and Shiv's elder son; Samar's adoptive son; Priam and Shanti's brother (2007–2009)
- Sahil Chauhan as Priam Kapoor – Gauri and Shiv's younger son; Samar's adoptive son; Om and Shanti's brother (2007–2009)
- Salil Ankola as Mahen Kapoor – Maya's brother; Nikhila's widower; Shiv, Samar and Palak's father; Om, Priam and Shanti's grandfather (2006–2009)
- Achint Kaur as Nikhila Kapoor – Mahen's wife; Shiv, Samar and Palak's mother; Om, Priam and Shanti's grandmother (2006–2008) (Dead)
- Andrea Cyrill as Palak Kapoor – Mahen and Nikhila's daughter; Shiv and Samar's sister; Ram's wife (2006–2008)
- Amit Khanna as Ram – Shiv's employee; Palak's husband (2006–2008)
- Geetanjali Tikekar as Maya Kapoor – Mahen's sister; Ayush's wife; Shiv, Samar and Palak's aunt; Nikhila's murderer (2006–2008)
- Kamalika Guha Thakurta as Devika Chatterjee – Alok's mother; Gauri and Kaya's grandmother (2006–2007)
- Amit Bhalla as Alok Chatterjee – Devika's son; Gauri and Kaya's father; Om, Priam, Shanti and Dhaani's grandfather (2006–2007)
- Shakti Singh as Mr. Kapoor – Mahen and Maya's father; Shiv, Samar and Palak's grandfather (2006–2009)
- Apara Mehta / Praveena Deshpande / Gargi Patel as Mrs. Kapoor – Mahen and Maya's mother; Shiv, Samar and Palak's grandmother (2006–2009)
- Hiten Tejwani as Anupam Bhattacharya – Nisha's half-brother; Ipshita's husband (2006–2008)
- Shriya Bisht as Ipshita Bhattacharya – Sukna's daughter; Shiv's ex-fiancée; Anupam's wife (2006–2007)
- Reshmi Ghosh as Nisha Bhattacharya – Anupam's half-sister; Samar's obsessed lover (2007–2009)
- Arbaaz Ali Khan as Moksh Kapoor – Mahen's nephew; Shiv, Samar and Palak's cousin; Shiv's murderer (2007–2008)
- Ashish Sharma as Asim Kapoor – Mahen's nephew; Shiv, Samar and Palak's cousin; Shiv's murderer (2007–2008)
- Sanyogita mayer as Kamya – Samar's obsessed lover (2008–2009)
- Deepak Dutta as Ayush – Maya's husband (2006–2008)
- Swati Anand as Sudeshna Chatterjee – Gauri and Kaya's sister-in-law (2006–2007)
- Roopa Ganguly as Suguna – A writer (2006)
- Smita Sarvade as Divya Kapoor
- Jaya Bhattacharya as Shaila Daksh Kapoor
- Vinay Jain / Vineet Sharma as Daksh Kapoor
- Avinash Sachdev as Sumit Malhotra (2006)
- Sanyogita Maheshwari as Kamya

== Production ==
=== Filming ===
Based on the backdrop of Kolkata, the series was initially filmed in Kolkata and mainly filmed in Mumbai.

=== Casting ===
During premiere, Pallavi Subhash was cast as the show's female lead Gauri. Mohammad Iqbal Khan was cast as male lead Shiv. Besides, Sumeet Sachdev, Aparna Mehta, Amarnath Kapoor, Rajiv, Delnaaz Paul, Salil Ankola, Geetanjali Tikekar, Achint Kaur, Rupa Ganguly, Jaya Battacharya, Karan Patel, Karan Kapoor, Rahul Jagtiani were cast then.

In December 2006, Iqbal Khan quit the series on not being interested to continue in the series and was replaced by Yash Tonk.

=== Development ===
Initially titled as Kasturi, it was later renamed to Karam Apnaa Apnaa before premiere.

Speaking about the series Producer Ekta Kapoor said, "Karam is a simple identifiable story. We wanted viewers to get something to chew on. I won't call this show different or out of this world. I'm accused of becoming distanced from reality in my recent shows."

In November 2006, Kapoor filed a petition in Bombay High Court when Salil Ankola quit the series for participating in Bigg Boss show of rival channel Sony Entertainment Television which violated his contract to work only for Balaji Telefilms and not any other programs. However, soon he returned to the series after he was made to leave the show by the channel Sony after court orders.

In the same month Pallavi Subhash playing Gauri suffered an electric shock while shooting and she fainted and soon recovered, causing the shooting to be delayed for a few hours.

=== Broadcast ===
On 27 January 2007, it was shifted from its 9:30 pm (IST) to 8:00 pm (IST) slot paving way for Kaun Banega Crorepati. However, with the not expected ratings delivered in the slot, it was shifted to an afternoon slot of 2:00pm (IST) in April 2007.

In November 2008, the shootings and telecast of all the Hindi television series including this series and films were stalled on 8 November 2008 due to dispute by the technician workers of FWICE (Federation of Western India Cine Employees) for increasing the wages, better work conditions and more breaks between shootings. FWICE first took a strike on 1 October 2008 when they addressed their problems with the producers and production was stalled. A contract was signed after four days of discussions and shooting were happening only for two hours content in a day then after which differences increased between them while channels gave them time until 30 October 2008 to sort it out. Failing to do so lead to protests again from 10 November 2008 to 19 November 2008 during which channels blacked out new broadcasts and repeat telecasts were shown from 10 November 2008. On 19 November 2008, the strike was called off after settling the disputes and the production resumed. The new episodes started to telecast from 1 December 2008.

== Reception ==
=== Ratings ===
In September 2006, it became the fifth most watched Hindi GEC with 7.12 TVR. In first week of December 2006, it garnered its highest rating of 8.6 TVR. In last week of 2006, it garnered 7.37 TVR.

=== Critics ===
Rediff stated, "The serial is truly different from the usual stuff dished out by Balaji Telefilms, and that's perhaps the reason it's gaining popularity by the day."
