= List of characters in Yeh Rishta Kya Kehlata Hai =

Indian TV series characters

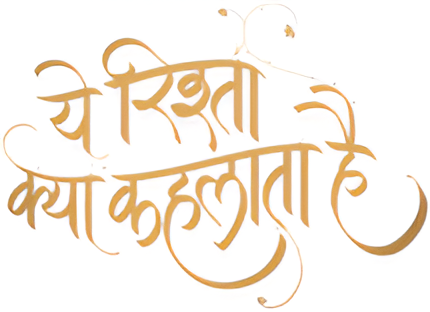

This is a list of characters in the longest-running Indian television soap opera Yeh Rishta Kya Kehlata Hai.

== Main cast ==
- Hina Khan as Akshara Maheshwari Singhania: Naitik's wife (2009–2016)
- Karan Mehra / Vishal Singh as Naitik "Munna" Singhania: Akshara Singhania's husband (2009–2016) / (2016–2018)
  - Yash Pandey as child Naitik (2012) (analepsis appearance)
- Shivangi Joshi as:
  - Naira Singhania Goenka: Kartik's late wife (2016–2021)
    - Ashnoor Kaur as child Naira (2015–2016)
    - Mishka Jain as baby Naira (2015)
  - Sirat Shekhawat Goenka: Aarohi's mother (2021)
    - Drashti Bhanushali as child Sirat (2021) (analepsis appearance)
- Mohsin Khan as Kartik "Kittu" Goenka: Naira's widower (2016–2021)
  - Vedant Pandya as child Kartik (2021) (analepsis appearance)
- Pranali Rathod as Advocate Akshara "Akshu" Goenka Sharma: Abhinav's widow (2021–2023)
  - Preeti Amin as older Akshara Sharma (2023)
  - Prachi Thakur as child Akshara Goenka (2021)
    - Anaya Gupta / Kairav Waghela as baby Akshara Goenka (2020–2021) / (2021)
- Harshad Chopda as Dr. Abhimanyu "Abhi" Birla: Akshara Sharma's ex-husband (2021–2023)
  - Het Makwana as child Abhimanyu (2022) (analepsis appearance)
- Samridhii Shukla as Advocate Abhira Sharma Poddar: Armaan's wife (2023–present)
- Shehzada Dhami / Rohit Purohit as Advocate Armaan "Aaru" Poddar: Abhira's husband (2023—2024) / (2024–present)
  - Pratyaksh Vardhan Singh as child Armaan (2023; 2024) (analepsis appearance)

== Recurring cast ==
=== Maheshwaris ===
Family lineage of Maheshwaris in Yeh Rishta Kya Kehlata Hai

- Vineeta Malik as Bhairavi Maheshwari: Vishwambharnath and Omkarnath's mother (2009–2018)
- Lata Sabharwal as Rajshri Goyel Maheshwari: Akshara Singhania's mother (2009–2019)
- Sanjeev Seth as Vishambharnath "Vishambhar" Maheshwari: Akshara Singhania's father (2009–2018)
- Neelima Taddepalli as Sunaina Maheshwari: Omkarnath's wife (2009–2018)
- Manu Malik as Omkarnath "Omi" Maheshwari: Anshuman Maheshwari's father (2009–2018)
- Pooja Joshi Arora as Varsha Agrawal Maheshwari: Shaurya's wife (2009–2020)
- Ather Habib / Yash Gera as Shaurya Maheshwari: Akshara Singhania's brother (2009–2013) / (2013–2017)
- Aman Sharma / Dheeraj Gumbar as Anshuman "Anshu" Maheshwari: Sunaina and Omkarnath's son (2009–2015) / (2015–2016)
- Shirin Sewani as Jasmeet "Jassi" Kaur Sethi Maheshwari: Anshuman Maheshwari's wife (2013–2018)
- Akshaya Naik as Ananya Maheshwari Sharma: Varsha and Shaurya's daughter (2015–2018)
  - Nairtiya Chandola as child Ananya (2012–2015)
    - Afiya as baby Ananya (2011–2012)
- Arjun Kohli as Ranveer Sharma: Ananya's husband (2016–2018)
- Anmol Jyotir as:
  - Nishant "Nannu" Maheshwari: Anshuman Maheshwari and Jasmeet's son (2016–2017)
    - Khushmeet Gill as child Nishant (2015–2016)
  - Luv Goenka (see below): Surekha and Akhilesh's elder twin son (2020–2021)
    - Shreshth Saxena as child Luv (2016–2019)
- Kaveri Priyam as Kuhu Maheshwari: Sneha and Shaurya's daughter (2019)
  - Yamini Makwana as teen Kuhu (2016–2017)
    - Harbandana Kaur as child Kuhu (2015–2016)
- Sunita Rajwar as Dhaniya Singh: Bhajinder's wife (2009–2012)
- Anand Mani as Bhajinder "Bhola" Singh: Maheshwaris' househelp and foster son (2009–2012)
- Roshan Khan as Gopi: Bhairavi's close friend and househelp (2009–2012)
- Amardeep Jha as Shankari Tai: Maheshwari's match maker (2009–2016, 2018)

=== Singhanias ===
Family lineage of Singhanias in Yeh Rishta Kya Kehlata Hai

- Medha Jambotakar as Kaveri Singhania: Mahendra's widow (2009–2021)
- Sanjay Gandhi / Abhijeet Lahiri as Mahendra Pratap Singhania: Nandini's father (2009–2010) / (2010–2015)
- Sandeep Mehta as Rajshekhar "Raj" Singhania: Naitik and Rashmi's father (2009–2018)
- Sonali Verma as Gayatri Singhania: Naitik and Rashmi's mother (2009–2013)
- Kshitee Jog as Dr. Devyani Singhania: Naman and Muskaan Awasthi's mother (2014–2021)
- Kirti Sually as Parvati Singhania: Mahendra and Rajshekhar's elder sister (2010–2019)
- Rohan Mehra / Rishi Dev / Shehzad Shaikh as Naksh "Duggu/Lalla/Chiku" Singhania: Akshara Singhania and Naitik's son (2015–2016) / (2016–2018) / (2019–2021)
  - Shivansh Kotia as child Naksh (2012–2015, 2016)
    - Harsh / Bani as baby Naksh (2012) / (2012)
- Mohena Singh / Harsha Khandeparkar as Keerti Goenka Singhania: Naksh's wife (2016–2019) / (2020–2021)
- Saksham Kalia as Krish Singhania: Naksh and Keerti's son (2020–2021)
  - Dwiti Gajera as baby Krish Singhania (2019)
- Anshul Pandey as Naman Agrawal: Devyani and Suresh's son (2014–2016)
- Priyanka Udhwani as Karishma Agrawal: Naman's estranged wife (2014–2017)
- Rhea Sharma as Mishti Agrawal: Naman and Karishma's estranged daughter (2019)
  - Aarna Sharma as child and teen Mishti (2015–2017)
- Navika Kotia as:
  - Prerna "Chikki" Singhania: Rajshekhar and Gayatri Singhania's adoptive daughter (2013–2014)
    - Reem Shaikh as child Prerna (2012)
  - Maya "Mau" Khera: Kunal's sister (2022)
- Divya Bhatnagar as Gulabo: Singhanias' former househelp (2009–2011)
- Nea Srivastav as Girija: Singhania's househelp (2011–2016)
- Rakesh Deewana as Maharaj: Singhanias' cook (2009–2014)

=== Goyels ===
- Bhuvan Chopra as Ratan Goyel: Ramola's son (2009)
- Ruma Roma Sengupta as Ramola Goyel: Rajshri and Ratan's mother (2009–2011)
- Pragati Chourasiya as Tanu Goyel: Ratan's daughter (2010–2012)

=== Chauhans ===
Family lineage of Shahs in Yeh Rishta Kya Kehlata Hai

- Nidhi Uttam as Nandini Singhania Chauhan: Kaveri Singhania and Mahendra's daughter (2009–2019)
- Ayush Agarwal / Shamik Abbas as Mohit Chauhan: Nandini's husband (2009–2015) / (2015–2019)
- Sanchit Sharma as Yash Chauhan: Nandini and Mohit's adopted son (2015–2017)
  - Ansh Kaul as child Yash (2012–2015)
- Sippora Zoutewelle as Rose Wilkins Chauhan: Yash's wife (2016)
- Karan Pahwa as Anmol Chauhan: Mohit and Nandini's son (2016; 2018–2019)
  - Atharva Padhye as child Anmol (2015–2016)
- Shreya Sharma / Vaishnavi Rao as Mansi Goenka Chauhan: Anmol's wife (2017) / (2018–2019)
- Urmila Sharma / Sunita Rao as Rukmini Chauhan: Mohit and Koyel's mother (2009–2012) / (2012–2019, 2021)
- Trishika Tiwari as Koyel Chauhan: Rukmini's daughter (2010–2012)

=== Desais ===
- Neha Saroopa as Rashmi Singhania Desai: Gayatri Deora's mother (2009–2016)
- Mazher Sayed as Sameer Desai: Rashmi's second husband (2015–2016)

=== Awasthis ===
- Zarina Roshan Khan as Muskaan Agrawal Awasthi: Devyani and Suresh's daughter (2014–2015)
- Amit Dolawat as Alok Awasthi: Muskaan Awasthi's husband (2009, 2014–2015)

=== Deoras ===
Family lineage of Deoras in Yeh Rishta Kya Kehlata Hai

- Kanchi Singh / Deblina Chatterjee / Simran Khanna as Gayatri "Gayu" Deora: Rashmi and Nikhil's daughter (2016–2017) / (2018–2019) / (2019–2021)
  - Payal Bhojwani as child Gayatri Deora (2015–2016)
- Ashish Kapoor as Nikhil Deora: Rashmi's ex-husband (2011–2013)
- Shravani Goswami as Rama Deora: Nikhil's mother (2011–2016, 2018–2020)
- Manoj Jaiswal as Rajendra Deora: Nikhil's father (2011–2013)

=== Goenkas ===
Family lineage of Goenkas in Yeh Rishta Kya Kehlata Hai

- Swati Chitnis as Suhasini "Triveni/Mimi" Ajmera Goenka: Manish and Akhilesh's mother (2016–2023)
- Parul Chauhan / Niyati Joshi as Swarna "Arpita" Gupta Goenka: Manish's wife (2016–2019) / (2019–2025)
- Sachin Tyagi as Manish Goenka: Keerti, Kartik and Shubham's father (2016–2025)
- Nupur Joshi as Soumya Goenka: Keerti and Kartik's mother (analepsis appearance) (2017)
- Shilpa Raizada / Saee Barve as Surekha Goenka: Akhilesh's wife (2016–2021) / (2023–present)
- Ali Hassan as Akhilesh "Akhil / AG" Goenka: Mansi, Luv and Kush's father (2016–2022)
- Gaurav Wadhwa as Shubham "Aryan" Goenka: Manish and Swarna's son (2017–2018)
- Samir Onkar as Samarth Goenka: Vatsal's father (2018–2020)
  - Vansh Sayani as child Samarth (2018) (analepsis appearance)
- Apoorv Jyotir as Kush Goenka: Surekha and Akhilesh's younger twin son (2020–2021)
  - Shubh Saxena as child Kush (2016–2019)
- Mayank Arora / Abeer Singh Godhwani as Kairav Goenka: Naira and Kartik's son (2021–2022) / (2023)
  - Shaurya Shah / Tanmay Shah / Aarambh Trehan as child Kairav (2019) / (2019–2020) / (2020–2021)
- Shambhavi Singh as Muskaan Goenka: Kairav's wife (2023)
- Sharan Anandani as Vansh Goenka: Gayatri Deora and Vivaan's son (2021–2022)
  - Maaz Champ / Siddharth Dubey as child Vansh (2019–2020) / (2020–2021)
- Tejaswi Bhadane as Krishna "Chhori" Goenka: Kartik and Naira's adopted daughter (2020–2021)
- Devaj Bhanushali as baby Vatsal Goenka: Gayatri Deora and Samarth's son (2020)

=== Ajmeras ===
- Anita Kanwal as Tejaswini Ajmera: Suhasini and Purushottam's elder sister (2018)
- Rituraj Singh as Purushottam "Puru" Ajmera: Tejaswini and Suhasini's brother (2019)
- Aleya Ghosh as Ila Ajmera: Purushottam's daughter (2019)

=== Birlas ===
Family lineage of Birlas in Yeh Rishta Kya Kehlata Hai

- Karishma Sawant as Dr. Aarohi "Aaru" Goenka Birla: Neil's widow (2021–2023)
  - Siya Makwana as child Aarohi (2021)
- Paras Priyadarshan as Neil Birla: Avni and Harshvardhan's son (2021–2022)
- Ami Trivedi as Manjari Birla: Abhimanyu's mother (2021–2023)
- Vinay Jain as Dr. Harshvardhan "Harsh" Birla: Manjari's husband (2021–2023)
- Pragati Mehra as Dr. Mahima Birla: Party, Anisha and Nishtha's mother (2021–2023)
- Ashish Nayyar as Dr. Anandvardhan "Anand" Birla: Manjari's husband (2021–2023)
- Neeraj Goswami as Dr. Parth Birla: Mahima and Anandvardhan's son (2021–2023)
- Sehrish Ali / Nisha Nagpal as Shefali Birla: Parth's wife (2021) / (2021–2023)
- Nirbhay Thakur as Shivansh "Shivu" Birla: Parth and Shefali's son (2023)
  - Orrish Arora as baby Shivansh (2022–2023)
- Kashish Rai as Anisha Birla: Kairav's ex-fianceé (2022)
- Niharika Chouksey / Nancy Roy as Nishtha Birla: Mahima and Anandvardhan's younger daughter (2021–2022) / (2022–2023)

=== Sharmas ===
Family lineage of Sharmas in Yeh Rishta Kya Kehlata Hai

- Jay Soni as Abhinav Sharma: Abhira's father (2022–2023)
- Mohit Parmar as Abhir Sharma: Akshara Sharma and Abhimanyu's son (2024–2026)
  - Shreyansh Kaurav as child Abhir (2023)
- Sharon Verma as Kiara Poddar Sharma: Abhir's wife (2023–2026)
- Saloni Sandhu as Advocate Charu Bansal Sharma: Abhir's late wife (2023–2025)
- Farida Dadi as Neelima aka Neela Amma: Muskaan Goenka's grandmother (2023)

=== Poddars ===
Family lineage of Poddars in Yeh Rishta Kya Kehlata Hai

- Pratiksha Honmukhe / Garvita Sadhwani as Ruhi "Rooh" Birla Poddar: Rohit's widow (2023–2024) / (2024–2025)
  - Hera Mishra as child Ruhi (2023)
- Shivam Khajuria / Romiit Raaj as Advocate Rohit Poddar: Vidya and Madhav's son (2023–2024) / (2024–2025)
  - Shivaan as child Rohit (2023; 2024) (analepsis appearance)
- Anita Raj as Kaveri Poddar: Madhav, Kajal and Manoj's mother (2023–present)
- Shruti Ulfat as Vidya Poddar: Rohit's mother (2023–present)
- Sandeep Rajora as Inspector Madhav Poddar: Armaan and Rohit's father (2023–present)
  - Dhruvraaj Chaudhari as child Madhav (2025) (analepsis appearance)
- Shruti Rawat as Manisha "Meenu" Poddar: Manoj's wife (2023–present)
- Sikandar Kharbanda as Advocate Manoj "Mannu" Poddar: Kiara and Aryan's father (2023–present)
  - Darsh Chouhan as child Manoj (2025) (analepsis appearance)
- Hitul Pujara as Aryan Poddar: Manisha and Manoj's son (2026)
  - Manthan Setia as teen Aryan (2023–2025)
- Isha Dheerawani as Disha Poddar: Aryan's wife (2026)
- Agastya Kirtane as baby Daksh Poddar: Ruhi and Rohit's son (2024–2025)
- Vibhuti Thakur as Shivani Poddar: Armaan's mother (2025)
- Ruheen Ali Khan as Geetanjali "Geetu" Poddar: Armaan's late wife (2025)
- Arshiya Sharma as Maira "Mairu" Poddar: Abhira and Armaan's daughter (2026–present)
  - Urva Rumani as child Maira (2025–2026)
    - Aarya Gajera as baby Maira/Pookie (2025)
- Sarah Killedar as Mukti Poddar (formerly Vani Gupta): Abhira and Armaan's adopted daughter (2026)
  - Mayanshi Verma as child Vani Gupta (2025–2026)

=== Bansals ===
- Preeti Puri as Kajal Poddar Bansal: Krish Bansal and Charu's mother (2023–present)
  - Anokhi Singh as child Kajal (2025) (analepsis appearance)
- Siddharth Vasudev as Advocate Sanjay Bansal: Kajal's husband (2023–present)
- Rishabh Jaiswal / Aryan Arora as Advocate Krish Bansal: Kajal and Sanjay's son (2023–2026 / 2026–present)

=== Other characters ===
- Ali Merchant as Rituraj aka Bablu: Akshara Singhania's former suitor (2009–2012)
- Preeti Sharma as Bindiya: Rituraj's wife (2010–2012)
- Charu Asopa as Sneha: Kuhu's mother (2010)
- Radhika Vidyasagar as Sulekha Agrawal: Varsha's mother (2009–2011)
- Rudra Kaushish as:
  - Ranjan: Kaveri Singhania's brother (2012)
  - Sajjan Rajawat: Neeraj's father (2024)
- Akansha Kapil as Antara: Naitik's ex-lover (2012)
- Kush Sharma as Siddharth aka Sid: Antara's husband (2012)
- Pooran Kiri as Suresh Agrawal: Naman and Muskaan Awasthi's father (2014–2015)
- Vaishali Takkar as Sanjana "Sanju" Thakkar: Naksh's best-friend (2015–2016)
- Umang Jain as Nayantara "Tara" Singh Shekhawat: Naksh's ex-fianceé (2015–2016)
- Alok Nath as Chandrabhan Singh Shekhawat: Sangram, Vikram, Aditya Shekhawat and Nayantara's grandfather (2015–2016)
- Amal Sehrawat as Sangram Singh Shekhawat: Chandrabhan's eldest grandson (2015–2016)
- Sushant Marya as Vikram Singh Shekhawat: Chandrabhan's second grandson (2015–2016)
- Shivam Agarwal as Aditya Singh Shekhawat: Chandrabhan's youngest grandson (2015–2016)
- Rashmi Gupta as Preeti: Nayantara's best-friend (2016)
- Dakssh Ajit Singh as Inspector Shekhar: Police officer who headed Naira's rescue operation (2016)
- Sheetal Tiwari as Sukanya: Naira's friend (2016)
- Pooja Jadhav as Pungi: Naira's friend from orphanage (2016)
- Nikhil Sharma as Chandu: Naira's friend from Rishikesh (2016)
- Suzanne Bernert as Martha Wilkins: Rose's mother (2016)
- Kamalika Guha Thakurta as Gurumaa: Naira's dance trainer (2016)
- Fahad Ali as Vivaan: Gayatri Deora's ex-boyfriend (2016, 2019)
- Veena Jagthap as Nisha: A con girl fooling Naksh (2016)
- Romit Sharma as Aditya Bansal: Keerti's ex-husband (2017; 2019, 2020)
- Tiya Gandwani as Dr. Priyanka: Soumya's sister (2017–2019)
- Nikhil Sharma as Raghav: Naira and Kartik's rival (2017)
- Krittika Sharma as Suhana: A con girl fooling Shubham (2018)
- Shrey Pareek as Kabir: Naira's stalker (2018)
- Mrinal Singh Lal as Ashi: Kartik's best-friend (2018)
- Varun Toorkey as Rishabh: Naksh and Naira's friend (2019)
- Khushwant Walia as Mihir Kapoor: Naira's boss (2019)
- Radhika Chhabra as Liza: Naira's friend (2019)
- Pankhuri Awasthy as Vedika: Kartik's friend and ex-fiancée (2019–2020)
- Deepti Sahni as Dr. Pallavi Vyas: Vedik's friend (2019–2020)
- Payal Nair as Advocate Damini Mishra: Kartik's lawyer in Kairav's custody case (2019)
- Diksha Dhami as Trisha: A girl from Naira's orphanage (2020)
- Urfi Javed as Advocate Shivani Bhatia: Trisha's Lawyer in her molestation case (2020)
- Manoj Joshi as Advocate Shaktiman Jhaveri: Goenkas lawyer in Trisha's molestation case (2020)
- Alka Kaushal as Sita Devi Chaudhary: Goenka's conservative business partner (2020)
- Jaydeep Ashra as Kundan Chaudhary: Sita Devi's son (2020)
- Vrushika Mehta as Dr. Riddhima Saxena: Kairav's psychiatrist (2020)
- Amita Khopkar as Kalawati "Maudi" Shekhawat: Sirat's grandmother (2021)
- Ashita Dhawan as Sheela Shekhawat Rathore: Sirat and Sonu's mother (2021)
- Hrishikesh Pandey as Mukesh Rathore: Sheela's second husband (2021)
- Krishang Bhanushali as Sonu Rathore: Sheela and Mukesh's son (2021)
- Apara Mehta as Banjaran: Sirat and Kartik's matchmaker (2021)
- Priyamvada Kant as Riya: Surekha's niece (2021)
- Karan Kundrra as Ranveer Chauhan: Sirat's late husband (2021)
  - Mayank Padia as teenage Ranveer Chauhan (2021)
- Shahbaz Khan as Narendranath Chauhan: Ranveer Chauhan and Nidhi's father (2021)
- Anjali Gupta as Saroj Chauhan: Ranveer Chauhan and Nidhi's mother (2021)
- Maira Dharti Mehra as Nidhi Chauhan: Narendranath and Saroj's daughter (2021)
- Preyal Shah as Reem: Akshara Sharma and Abhimanyu's wedding planner (2021–2022)
- Pankaj Bijlani as Dr. Rohan Shah: Abhimanyu's best-friend (2021–2023)
- Mrunal Jain as Dr. Kunal Khera: Abhimanyu's physiotherapist (2022)
- Gaurav Sharma as Yuvraj Choudhary: Abhira's obsessive stalker (2023–2024; 2025)
- Ajay Kumar Nain as MLA Jagraj Choudhary: Yuvraj's father (2023)
- Vineet Raina as Advocate Dev Shekhawat: Abhira and Charu's former boss (2024)
- Suraj Sonik as fake Abhir: A con boy fooling Goenkas (2024)
- Sandeep Kumar as Dr. Manav Bharadwaj: Ruhi's former suitor (2024)
- Jay Zaveri as Vikas "VB" Bharadwaj: Manish's friend (2024)
- Shabaaz Abdullah Badi as Neeraj Rajawat: Charu's former suitor (2024)
- Dipali Kamath as Mala Rajawat: Neeraj's mother (2024)
- Kajal Chonkar as Sira Zimik alias Mountain Mouse: Krish Bansal's ex-girlfriend (2024–2025)
- Siddharth Shivpuri as Advocate Roop Kumar aka RK: Abhira's former admirer (2025)
- Divyam Shukla as Bittu: Roop Kumar's neighbour and brother-figure (2025)
- Neha Amrawat as Koyal: Maira's supposed-nanny and kidnapper (2025)
- Susheel Parashar as Digambar "Daddu": Geetanjali's grandfather (2025)
- Rahul Sharma as Anshuman Raizada: Abhira's ex-fiancé (2025)
- Charushree Singh as Tanya Raizada Damani: Samar's wife (2025–present)
- Smarth Mehta as Saharsh: Kiara's drug dealer (2025)
- Melissa Pais as Jalebi Bai: Prisoner who runs a human trafficking racket (2025)
- Riya Junni as Aliya "Aaloo" Choudhary: Priyanshu's wife (2025)
- Dhanshree Patil as Lavanya: Abhira and Aliya's roommate (2025)
- Kritik Yadav as Priyanshu "PJ" Choudhary: Yuvraj's cousin (2025)
- Rajat Sen as Rehaan: Armaan and Priyanshu's roommate (2025)
- Anju Jadhav as Meher Mittal: Armaan's ex-fianceé (2025–2026)
- Syed Zafar Ali as Shyaam Hari Mittal: Meher's father (2025–2026)
- Khushi Dani as Anita Gupta: Mukti's biological mother (2025–2026)
- Nimesh Soni as Ratan Kaka: Abhira and Armaan's neighbour and father figure (2026)
- Devarsh Nagar as Radheshyam: Meher's henchman (2026)
- Roopa Divetia as Damyanti: Disha's aunt (2026)
- Ashu Sharma as Nakul: Disha's father (2026)
- Sarwam Kulkarni as Rishabh: Maira's stalker (2026)
- Harshita Patharia as Amrita: Mukti's greedy biological aunt (2026)
- Aaditya Gupta / James Ghadge as Kabir "Kabbu" Damani: Nandini Damani and Raghav Damani's son (2026) / (2026–present)
- Aastha Chaudhary as Nandini Damani: Raghav Damani's wife (2026–present)
- Kuldeep Singh as Raghav "Raghu" Damani: Armaan's rival (2026–present)
- Aadesh Chaudhary as Samar Damani: Armaan's rival (2026–present)
- Neelu Vaghela as Bhairavi Devi Damani: Samar and Raghav Damani's grandmother (2026–present)
- Maitry Upadhyay Sawkar as Neena: Samar's ex-wife (2026–present)
- Mahi Bhanushali as Barkha Damani: Samar and Neena's daughter (2026–present)

== Guest appearances ==
Year	Actor(s)	Appearance	
2009	Shubhangi Atre	as Kasturi Chawla Sabharwal	from Kasturi
2009	Puja Banerjee	as Vrinda Shehrawat	from Tujh Sang Preet Lagai Sajna
2009	Shweta Tiwari	as Prerna Sharma	from Kasautii Zindagii Kay
2009	Sara Khan	as Sadhna Rajvansh	from Sapna Babul Ka...Bidaai
2009	Angad Hasija	as Alekh Rajvansh	from Sapna Babul Ka...Bidaai
2009	Kinshuk Mahajan	as Ranvir Rajvansh	from Sapna Babul Ka...Bidaai
2010	Anupriya Kapoor	as Taani Banerjee Ganguly	from Tere Liye
2010	Neha Sargam	as Nivedita Viren Sood	from Chand Chupa Badal Mein
2010	Pooja Gor	as Pratigya Saxena / Pratigya Krishna Singh Thakur	from Mann Kee Awaaz Pratigya
2011	Sanaya Irani	as Khushi Kumari Gupta Raizada	from Iss Pyaar Ko Kya Naam Doon?
2011	Barun Sobti	as Arnav Singh Raizada	from Iss Pyaar Ko Kya Naam Doon?
2011	Soumya Seth	as Navya Anant Bajpai	from Navya..Naye Dhadkan Naye Sawaal
2011	Krystle D'Souza	as Jeevika Chaudhary	from Ek Hazaaron Mein Meri Behna Hai
2011	Nia Sharma	as Maanvi Chaudhary	from Ek Hazaaron Mein Meri Behna Hai
2011	Karan Tacker	as Viren Singh Vadhera	from Ek Hazaaron Mein Meri Behna Hai
2011	Kushal Tandon	as Virat Singh Vadhera	from Ek Hazaaron Mein Meri Behna Hai
2012, 2016	Deepika Singh	as Sandhya Rathi	from Diya Aur Baati Hum
2012	Anas Rashid	as Sooraj Rathi	from Diya Aur Baati Hum
2012	Neelu Vaghela	as Santosh Rathi	from Diya Aur Baati Hum
2012	Kanika Maheshwari	as Meenakshi Rathi	from Diya Aur Baati Hum
2012	Aamir Khan	To promote Satyamev Jayate	
2013	Devoleena Bhattacharjee	as Gopi Modi	from Saath Nibhaana Saathiya
2015	Hiba Nawab	as Amaya Mathur	from Tere Sheher Mein
2015	Sachin Tyagi	Rishi Mathur	from Tere Sheher Mein
2017	Badshah	for Dance Performance at Kartik and Naira's "Sangeet"	
2017	Shah Rukh Khan and Anushka Sharma	To promote their film Jab Harry Met Sejal	
2017	Akshay Kumar, Bhumi Pednekar and Sana Khan	To promote their film Toilet: Ek Prem Katha	
2017	Alka Yagnik	Special performance for a tribute to Akshara on Naksh-Keerti's "Sangeet"	
2018	Adaa Khan	for special dance performance on Valentine's Day	
2018	Supriya Pathak	to promote her show Khichdi	
2019	Namit Khanna	to promote their show	from Sanjivani
2019	Gurdeep Kohli	to promote their show	from Sanjivani
2021	Pooja Gor	as Pratigya Thakur	from Mann Kee Awaaz Pratigya 2
2022; 2023; 2024; 2025	Rupali Ganguly	as Anupamaa Joshi	from Anupamaa
2022	Gaurav Khanna	as Anuj Kapadia	from Anupamaa
2022	Sudhanshu Pandey	as Vanraj Shah	from Anupamaa
2022	Madalsa Sharma Chakraborty	as Kavya Shah	from Anupamaa
2022	Paras Kalnawat	as Samar Shah	from Anupamaa
2022	Arvind Vaidya	as Hasmukh Shah	from Anupamaa
2022	Nidhi Shah	as Kinjal Dave Shah	from Anupamaa
2022	Alpana Buch	as Leela Shah	from Anupamaa
2022	Tassnim Sheikh	as Rakhi Dave	from Anupamaa
2022	Shekhar Shukla	as Jignesh	from Anupamaa
2022	Kumar Sanu	Special performance on Akshara-Abhimanyu's sangeet	
2023	Kajol	as Noyonika Sengupta	from The Trial
2023, 2024	Sayli Salunkhe	as Vandana Malhotra	from Baatein Kuch Ankahee Si
2024	Jazlyn Talwani	as Tara Malhotra	from Baatein Kuch Ankahee Si
2024	Ankita Sharma	as Vedika Malhotra	from Baatein Kuch Ankahee Si
2024	Leena Jumani	as Sonia	from Baatein Kuch Ankahee Si
2024	Sheeba Akashdeep Sabir	as Pammi Sood	from Baatein Kuch Ankahee Si
2024	Romiit Raaj	as Bobby Sood	from Baatein Kuch Ankahee Si
2024	Garvita Sadhwani	as Mrunal Karmarkar	from Baatein Kuch Ankahee Si
2024	Bhoomi Trivedi	Special performance on Makar Sankranti	
2024	Rupali Ganguly	as Anupamaa Joshi	from Anupamaa for Rakshabandhan special
2024	Gaurav Khanna	as Anuj Kapadia	from Anupamaa for Rakshabandhan special
2024	Aurra Bhatnagar Badoni	as Aadhya Kapadia	from Anupamaa for Rakshabandhan special
2024	Sudhanshu Pandey	as Vanraj Shah	from Anupamaa for Rakshabandhan special
2024	Alpana Buch	as Leela Shah	from Anupamaa for Rakshabandhan special
2024	Vijayendra Kumeria	as Dev Chaudhary	from Deewaniyat
2025	Abhika Malakar	as Rudrani "Rani" Doshi	from Pocket Mein Aasman
2025	Neha Harsora	as Sailee Jadhav Deshmukh	from Udne Ki Aasha
