= ITA Award for Best Drama Popular =

Indian Television Academy Award

ITA Award for Best Show Popular
- Type: Best Show Popular
- Awarded for: Most Popular Show
- Country: India
- Presented by: Indian Television Academy Awards
- Formerly called: Desh Ka Dharavahik
- First award: 2001
- Final award: 2024

Highlights
- Most wins: Kyunki Saas Bhi Kabhi Bahu Thi (5)
- Total awarded: 24 awards
- First winner: Kyunki Saas Bhi Kabhi Bahu Thi (2001)
- Latest winner: Anupamaa (2024)
- Website: Website

ITA Award for Best Drama Popular is an award given by Indian Television Academy as a part of its annual event. The winners are decided by audience voting. First awarded in 2001, it was originally named Desh Ka Dharavahik but was later renamed to Best Show Popular.

== Winners ==
Year	Show	Production House	Channel	Ref
2001	Kyunki Saas Bhi Kabhi Bahu Thi	Balaji Telefilms	Star Plus	
2002	Kyunki Saas Bhi Kabhi Bahu Thi	Balaji Telefilms	Star Plus	
2003	Kyunki Saas Bhi Kabhi Bahu Thi	Balaji Telefilms	Star Plus	
2004	Kyunki Saas Bhi Kabhi Bahu Thi	Balaji Telefilms	Star Plus	
2005	Kyunki Saas Bhi Kabhi Bahu Thi	Balaji Telefilms	Star Plus	
2006	Saat Phere: Saloni Ka Safar	Sphere Origins	Zee TV	
2007	Banoo Main Teri Dulhann	Shakuntalam Telefilms	Zee TV	
2008	Sapna Babul Ka...Bidaai	Director Kut's Productions	Star Plus	
2009	Yeh Rishta Kya Kehlata Hai	Director Kut's Productions	Star Plus	
2010	Mann Kee Awaaz Pratigya	Spellbound Productions; Walkwater Productions	Star Plus	
2011	Saath Nibhaana Saathiya	Rashmi Sharma Telefilms	Star Plus	
2012	Diya Aur Baati Hum	Shashi Sumeet Productions	Star Plus	
2013	Qubool Hai	4 Lions Films	Zee TV	
2014	Diya Aur Baati Hum	Shashi Sumeet Productions	Star Plus	
2015	Saath Nibhaana Saathiya	Rashmi Sharma Telefilms	Star Plus	
2016	Shakti – Astitva Ke Ehsaas Ki	Rashmi Sharma Telefilms	Colors TV	
2017	Ishqbaaaz	4 Lions Films	Star Plus	
2018	Bepannah	Cinevistaas Limited	Colors TV	
2019	Kundali Bhagya	Balaji Telefilms	Zee TV	
2020	Ishq Mein Marjawan 2	Inspire Films	Colors TV	
2021	Anupamaa	Director's Kut Productions	Star Plus	
2022	Taarak Mehta Ka Ooltah Chashmah	Neela Film Productions	Sony SAB	
2023	Yeh Rishta Kya Kehlata Hai	Director's Kut Productions	Star Plus	
2024	Anupamaa	Director's Kut Productions	Star Plus	

== See also ==
- ITA Award for Best Show Drama
- ITA Award for Best Actor Popular
- ITA Award for Best Actress Popular
- ITA Award for Best Actor Drama
- ITA Award for Best Actress Drama
