= Anupama: Namaste America =

Indian Hindi language drama web series

- Genre: Drama
- Written by: Bhavna Vyas
- Screenplay by: Namita Vartak; Zama Habib
- Story by: Bhavna Vyas
- Directed by: Romesh Kalra
- Creative director: Ketaki Walawalkar
- Starring: Rupali Ganguly; Sudhanshu Pandey
- Country of origin: India
- Original language: Hindi
- No. of seasons: 1
- No. of episodes: 11

Production
- Producers: Rajan Shahi; Ishika Shahi
- Cinematography: Gulshan Shah
- Editor: Sameer Gandhi
- Camera setup: Multi-camera
- Production company: Director's Kut Productions

Original release
- Network: Disney+ Hotstar
- Release: 25 April – 6 May 2022

Related
- Anupamaa

Anupama: Namaste America is an Indian Hindi-language drama television series which aired on 25 April 2022 on Disney+ Hotstar. Produced by Rajan Shahi and Ishika Shahi under Director's Kut Productions, it stars Rupali Ganguly and Sudhanshu Pandey. It is an eleven-episode prequel series to Star Plus's Hindi television series Anupamaa which concluded on 6 May 2022.

== Premise ==
The story is set 17 years ago in 2005, ten years after Anupama and Vanraj's marriage, when Anupama was Vanraj's wife and a mother to Paritosh and Samar, she had an opportunity to fulfil her dream in the USA. However, some conditions forced her to quit her dream and become the Anupama shown in the initial episodes of Anupamaa.

== Cast ==
=== Main ===
- Rupali Ganguly as Anupama "Anu" Joshi Shah: Kanta's daughter; Bhavesh's sister; Vanraj's wife; Paritosh and Samar's mother
- Sudhanshu Pandey as Vanraj Shah: Leela and Hasmukh's son; Dolly's brother; Ritika's former boyfriend; Anupama's husband; Paritosh and Samar's father
- Sarita Joshi as Kaushalya Shah aka Moti Baa: Hasmukh's mother; Vanraj and Dolly's grandmother; Paritosh and Samar's great-grandmother
- Vidhvaan Sharma as Young Samar "Bakuda" Shah: Anupama and Vanraj's younger son; Paritosh's brother
- Dheer Bhanushali as Young Paritosh "Toshu" Shah: Anupama and Vanraj's elder son; Samar's brother

=== Recurring ===
- Puja Banerjee as Ritika Sharma: Ravi's wife; Vanraj's former girlfriend
- Arvind Vaidya as Hasmukh Shah aka Bapuji: Kaushalya's son; Leela's husband; Vanraj and Dolly's father; Paritosh and Samar's grandfather
- Alpana Buch as Leela Shah aka Baa: Hasmukh's wife; Vanraj and Dolly's mother; Paritosh and Samar's grandmother
- Ekta Saraiya as Dolly Shah Dhamecha: Leela and Hasmukh's daughter; Vanraj's sister; Sanjay's wife
- Gaurav Khanna as Anuj "AK" Kapadia: Owner of Kapadia Group of Industries; Gopichand's foster son; Malvika's brother; Anupama's one-sided lover
- Madalsa Sharma Chakraborty as Kavya Gandhi: Aniruddh's wife
- Paresh Bhatt as Sanjay Dhamecha: Jignesh Dhamecha and Urvashi's son; Dolly's husband
- Mehul Buch as Jignesh Dhamecha: Urvashi's husband; Sanjay's father
- Pallavi Pradhan as Urvashi Dhamecha: Jignesh Dhamecha's wife; Sanjay's mother
- Arup Pal as Vanraj's manager
- Shilpa Kataria Singh as Vanraj's manager's wife
- Pragati Mehra as Dr. Pragati Mehra: Anupama's gynecologists
- Riyaz Panjwani as Mr. Dholakia: Vanraj's colleague

== Episodes ==
No.	Title	Directed by	Written by	Original release date	Length (Minutes)
1	"Anupama surprises Vanraj"	Romesh Kalra	Bhavna Vyas	25 April 2022	24 minutes
Anupama Shah is a simple Gujarati homemaker married to Vanraj Shah and the mother of two sons – Paritosh and Samar. She is an excellent Kathak dancer and has a great passion for dance so does her younger son Samar. But her mother-in-law Leela despises her for her passion towards dance but her father-in-law Hasmukh and grandmother-in-law Kaushalya support her. Soon Vanraj's manager calls him to attend a family party organised for all employees of the company where he can be promoted for the USA project and asks him to bring Anupama along. But he makes excuses to bring her as he thinks she is just a mere housewife who can't be taken out of the house. But on Kaushalya's encouragement Anupama agrees to surprise him.
2	"Anupama's American Opportunity"	Romesh Kalra	Bhavna Vyas	26 April 2022	23 minutes
After Kaushalya convinces him, Vanraj takes Anupama to his colleague party. There everyone is stunned by her simplicity, beauty and dancing skills. Vanraj's manager's wife decides to take Anupama to the USA as a part of her program to promote Indian culture, unaware of his true nature that he actually thinks of a wife as domestic material. This surprises him because his promotion and US trip are postponed. Samar, Paritosh, Dolly, Hasmukh and Kaushalya rejoice learning the same while Leela and Vanraj become jealous. Soon Vanraj receives a message from his college-days girlfriend Ritika who chose her career over him that she will return to India for work and plans to meet him.
3	"Will Vanraj sabotage Anupama's dream?"	Romesh Kalra	Bhavna Vyas	27 April 2022	22 minutes
Kaushalya explains Anupama the importance of trust, support and mutual love and understanding as well as importance of self-love and self-respect for a healthy relationship by giving her and her husband's example that he always supported her, Leela and Hasmukh's example that Leela never values Hasmukh and Vanraj and Anupama's example how Vanraj never values her. Anupama thinks that Vanraj respects her dreams but he plans to disregard her dreams by keeping her as nothing more than a housewife. The next day as Anupama prepares to record an audition video Leela taunts her and Samar also expresses his desire to become a dancer but Vanraj taunts that "Boys Never Dance". However Kaushalya supports the mother-son duo to follow their dreams. However Vanraj decides to not forward the audition cassette to his manager's wife and goes to meet Ritika.
4	"The Past knocks Vanraj's Door"	Romesh Kalra	Bhavna Vyas	28 April 2022	24 minutes
Dolly teaches English to Anupama but she worries about her kids and Dolly promises to keep a good care of them. Meanwhile Vanraj meets Ritika, now a wife to Ravi and recalls his failed love story with her in the 1990s. A college student Vanraj belonging to a middle-class family and a rich diva student Ritika deeply loved each other. However Vanraj's habit of constantly involving his family in their talks irritated her. As their love story progressed and they found corporate jobs, Ritika revealed that she wants to live in a nuclear family and continue her status, upsetting Vanraj. However things didn't work well as Ritika agreed to marry her father's NRI friend's son Ravi to continue her lifestyle and asks Vanraj to move on. Ritika married Ravi and Vanraj married Anupama. However she realized that she can't forget Vanraj and decides to divorce Ravi to marry Vanraj and asks him to divorce Anupama also. Vanraj refuses to bend upon Ritika's wish as he doesn't want to leave Anupama.
5	"Anupama Meets Ritika"	Romesh Kalra	Bhavna Vyas	29 April 2022	22 minutes
Vanraj returns home by declining his manager's order to give Anupama's audition cassette and Ritika's request to divorce Anupama and starts misbehaving with her for wearing his perfume. However Kaushalya scolds him for this and makes him apologize Anupama and his manager also informs him that his wife sent the colleague party's CD as an audition cassette, infuriating him. Soon Ritika comes to his home to meet his whole family as Vanraj's "friend" and to make her feel jealous he starts praising Anupama. However Leela notices this and warns him to break all ties with Ritika for the sake of his married life and sons. To his dismay, his manager informs him that Anupama has been selected for his wife's project to spread Indian culture in the USA.
6	"A Sweet Surprise for Anupama"	Romesh Kalra	Bhavna Vyas	30 April 2022	23 minutes
Anupama is excited to learn about her selection while Ritika sees it as an opportunity to become closer to Vanraj. While Vanraj goes to drop Ritika where she tries to seduce him to regain him, Anupama expresses her love towards Vanraj through a poem. However Vanraj refuses Ritika's advances because he doesn't want to leave Anupama. Kaushalya warns Anupama about Ritika's intentions but she expresses her faith in Vanraj and discusses Anuj about whom she listened from Devika and considers him to be Devika's best friend. Later Leela and Vanraj scheme to crush Anupama's dreams while Vanraj juggles his feelings for both women.
7	"A Romantic Night"	Romesh Kalra	Bhavna Vyas	2 May 2022	24 minutes
Vanraj reflects upon Leela's words to stop Anupama and becomes intimate with her by feigning love. Anupama thinks that he loves her and starts taking English classes by Dolly to give interview for visa meanwhile Vanraj also becomes dual-minded to rekindle his relationship with Ritika again. The story takes a leap of twenty days and Leela invites Sanjay Dhamecha, a prospective groom for Dolly along with his family (who are unaware of her intentions) to finalise Dolly and Sanjay's relationship. Initially everyone thinks that Leela genuinely forgot that she invited Dhamechas for Dolly's match-making but her truth comes out in front of Hasmukh and Kaushalya. Anupama starts showing signs of her third pregnancy while Dolly agrees for her and Sanjay's match due to simple and supporting nature of him and his parents for her studies and vice versa and they agree for their marriage the coming month making Anupama worried as she also needs to go USA the coming month. Dhamechas think that Leela also supports Anupama and she leaves for visa interview with Hasmukh however they are caught in a traffic jam.
8	"Good News or Bad News?"	Romesh Kalra	Bhavna Vyas	3 May 2022	23 minutes
Anupama decides to walk to the visa interview. However a girl dressed up as Lord Krishna drops her on her scooty. There Anupama becomes nervous due to English and thinks that she failed in the interview making her supporters sad and Vanraj and Leela happy. Dolly also gives her consent to marry Sanjay and Vanraj and Leela manipulates Anupama by saying that now they will be together for Dolly's marriage. Vanraj, who thinks that Anupama won't fulfil her dreams, loses his euphoria and tries to deceive his manager but he doubts his intentions. The story takes a leap of two weeks and it is shown that Dolly's marriage preparations are on full swing however Anupama feels sad on seeing her previous preparations to go to the USA and Samar encourages her as he can't see tears in his mother's eyes (in the similar way the grown up version of Samar do in original series). But she falls unconscious and Kaushalya takes her to the gynaecologist. While Leela fumes because Anupama went to a gynaecologist (as usual, envying her) and the visa being issued in her name Vanraj visits Ritika's house who is now obsessed with him and urges him to shift with her to the USA. But Vanraj denies and is angered when his manager informs him that Anupama has been issued a visa on her name. Anupama's gynaecologist reveals that she is pregnant for the third time and the latter wishes for a baby girl and gynaecologist assures that she can dance and travel in pregnancy. Meanwhile Leela schemes to destroy Anupama's visa by giving it to Paritosh and Samar.
9	"Caught!"	Romesh Kalra	Bhavna Vyas	4 May 2022	24 minutes
Anupama informs Vanraj about her pregnancy and he becomes happy by learning that this baby can be a baby girl. While Leela's plan backfires to destroy Anupama's passport via Paritosh's hands she tells something shocking to Dolly after she saves Anupama's passport. Gynaecologist informs Vanraj that Anupama can dance and travel in pregnancy but he manipulates his manager by saying that Anupama's pregnancy is complicated hence she can't come or dance. Leela is happy thinking that Anupama won't be able to fulfil her dreams but Dolly feels uneasy about what Leela told her. On enquiring Leela bluntly lies that she's just sad for her life without her parental family after marriage but Kaushalya suspects foul play. The transgender community blesses Anupama to have a baby girl. Anupama feels bad thinking that her passport was not issued and she won't be able to make herself feel proud in front of her children's eyes and shares her pain with Kaushalya. But she encourages Anupama. While Anupama decides to decorate her room from Samar and Paritosh's clothes when they were babies Leela warns Vanraj to forget Ritika and stop meeting her as Anupama is his wife and he has three children. But Anupama discovers Vanraj and Leela's plot to stop her as she finds her passport with visa in Vanraj's bag. Vanraj thinks that Anupama will not be able to find her passport and brings a Gajra for her but is surprised to see a passport in her hand.
10	"Anupama has an Outburst"	Romesh Kalra	Bhavna Vyas	5 May 2022	24 minutes
Vanraj makes excuses after seeing the passport in Anupama's hand but she realises that Vanraj and Leela betrayed her. The next day she confronts both of them after they tag her a Devi for sacrificing her dreams for the sake of family. Kaushalya confronts Vanraj and Leela for the same but they defend each other saying that whatever they did was the only option left to save family as they think once a housewife starts living her life on her own terms the family is ruined. A heartbroken Anupama breaks her Ghunghroo clarifying that she abandoned her dreams for her family's sake. Vanraj again feigns concern and tries to justify his actions but Anupama realises that what happened on her selection night was a planned romance to stop her from going to the USA. She confronts Vanraj regarding this, to his surprise.
11	"Family First"	Romesh Kalra	Bhavna Vyas	6 May 2022	24 minutes
After Anupama confronts Vanraj for trying to stop her from going to the USA, he tries to leave but Anupama says that she won't forget this betrayal by Vanraj and Leela. The story takes a leap of six months and the Shahs move back to their old home "Krishn Kunj" after renovation and Anupama has a baby-shower. Anupama is still trying to cope with Vanraj and Leela's betrayal waiting for her baby's arrival. But Leela intentionally makes her remember the same and asks her to cook for Dolly's in-laws for which Kaushalya reprimands her for giving more pain to Anupama and blesses that Anupama will fulfil her dream in future. Vanraj is informed that he has been selected for the USA project and needs to leave within two months. Vanraj as usual portrays himself as the victim and claims that he has made a great sacrifice, and Anupama vows to fulfil her dream in the future. Anuj Kapadia, Anupama's college-days one-sided lover, returns to Ahmedabad, wishes to see Anupama, and unknowingly crosses paths with Vanraj. He is heartbroken to see Anupama pregnant and having two sons, but wishes to meet her once while Vanraj meets Kavya Gandhi on his way to the office. The narrator concludes the story with a poem describing everyone's future lives, which leads to the present day story of Anupamaa.

== Production ==
=== Development ===
Rajan Shahi the producer of Anupamaa announced to make a prequel web series to Star Plus TV series Anupamaa.

=== Casting ===
Though most of the cast from original series were retained including Rupali Ganguly, Sudhanshu Pandey, Arvind Vaidya, Alpana Buch, Ekta Saraiya and Paresh Bhatt reprising their original roles as Anupama, Vanraj, Hasmukh, Leela, Dolly and Sanjay respectively. Paras Kalnawat and Ashish Mehrotra playing Samar and Paritosh respectively were not cast for the series due to their characters being portrayed as younger children, thus their roles were assigned to child actors Vidhvaan Sharma and Dheer Bhanushali respectively. Muskan Bamne playing Pakhi was also excluded from the cast because her character was yet to be born. While Madalsa Sharma Chakraborty's character Kavya Gandhi was excluded however Chakraborty reprised her role in the last episode. A new character, played by Puja Banerjee, Ritika, was included as Vanraj's college-days girlfriend. Aneri Vajani and Nidhi Shah's roles Malvika and Kinjal respectively were eliminated from the series. Sarita Joshi was cast to play Hasmukh's mother Moti Baa. Later Gaurav Khanna also reprised his role of Anuj Kapadia in the last episode. In further episodes, Mehul Buch and Pallavi Pradhan were cast as Sanjay's parents, Mr. and Mrs. Dhamecha. Pragati Mehra was seen playing the role of gynaecologist. The series concluded with Sachin Tyagi narrating the characters' futures with a poem, leading to the current story of Anupamaa.

=== Filming ===
The series has been shot on the original sets of Anupamaa with some changes in Film City, Mumbai.

=== Broadcast ===
The eleven-episode series premiered on Disney+ Hotstar on 25 April 2022, with each episode being uploaded daily and concluded on 6 May 2022.

== Sequel ==
Anupamaa, a sequel to the drama series premiered on 13 July 2020 on Star Plus, and digitally streams on Disney+ Hotstar. It is loosely based on Star Jalsha's Bengali series Sreemoyee, and currently stars Rupali Ganguly, Adrija Roy and Shivam Khajuria and formerly starred Sudhanshu Pandey, Madalsa Sharma, Gaurav Khanna and Alisha Parveen Khan.

== Reception ==
Arushi Jain of Indian Express wrote "I feel the show is only an extension of what we saw in the first six months of its televised version: it tells you what all Anupama ‘jheloed’ in her marriage with Vanraj. Only this time, Ganguly has kept Anupama chirpy and lively, but she also delivers enough sad-but-c’est-la-vie expressions into the camera".
