= Jamuna Paar =

- Genre: Drama
- Created by: Director Kut's Productions
- Written by: Zama Habib, Anand Shivakumaran, Amit Pradhan, Preiti Mamgain & Girish Dhamija
- Directed by: Partho Mitra, Niraj Baliyan & Pradeep Gupta
- Creative directors: Ritu Goel, Shalini Jha & Siddhi Hirawat
- Theme music composer: Dony Hazarika
- Country of origin: India
- Original language: Hindi
- No. of episodes: 34

Production
- Producer: Rajan Shahi
- Cinematography: Vineet Sapru
- Editor: Sameer Gandhi
- Running time: 20 minutes
- Production company: Director Kut's Productions

Original release
- Network: Imagine TV
- Release: 27 February – 11 May 2012

Jamuna Paar (transl. Beyond the Jumuna) is an Indian drama aired on Imagine TV. The show premiered on 27 February 2012 and ended on 11 May 2012. It was produced by Rajan Shahi under Director's Kut Production. The show ended abruptly within two months due to the closure of the respective channel.

== Plot ==
Jamuna Paar is a story about two people seeking their soul mate and love of their lives but eventually they find each other. They discover they do not have to change themselves because they love each other just the way they are.

== Cast ==
=== Main ===
- Ankur Verma as Brijesh Kumar Katewa a.k.a. Bijju
- Vidhi Parekh as Vidhi Malhotra

=== Recurring ===
- Abhay Joshi as Fatehchand Katewa - Bijju's tau
- Alisha Ahluwalia as Jassi
- Poonam Chauvan as Bhakti Katewa tai
- Sushil Khosala as Sushil Katewa - Bijju's cousin brother
- Rajshri Deshpande as Kanchan Katewa - Sushil's wife
- Devender Chaudhry as Manikchand Katewa - Bijju's father
- Sapna Sand as Shanti Katewa - Bijju's mother
- Abhishek Gupta as Prakash Katewa - Bijju's elder brother
- Anjali Rana as Manju Katewa - Prakash's wife
- Tanya Abrol as Kalpana Kotwal - Bijju's sister; SRK's wife
- Dheeraj Mijlani as Sant Ram Kotwal a.k.a. SRK - Kalpana's husband
- Sohail as Chintu - Kanchan and Sushil's son
- Ajay Raj Tomar as Mr. Sinha - Vidhi's boutique's manager
