= Shiksha Mandal =

Indian Hindi-language web-series

- Genre: Crime Thriller
- Based on: Vyapam scam
- Written by: Syed Ahmad Afzal
- Directed by: Syed Ahmad Afzal
- Starring: Gulshan Devaiah; Gauhar Khan; Pawan Malhotra
- Country of origin: India
- Original language: Hindi
- No. of episodes: 9

Production
- Editor: Kamesh Karna

Original release
- Network: MX Player
- Release: 15 September 2022

Shiksha Mandal is an Indian Hindi-language crime drama web-series written and directed by Syed Ahmad Afzal and starring Gulshan Devaiah, Gauhar Khan and Pawan Malhotra. It was premiered on MX Player on 15 September 2022.

== Plot summary ==
The story is inspired by true events related to Vyapam scam, one of the biggest medical entrance exam scam in India.

== Cast ==
- Gulshan Devaiah as Aditya Rai
- Gauhar Khan as Anuradha Singh Shrivastava
- Pawan Malhotra as Dhansu Yadav
- Rajendra Sethi as Jungal Singh
- Dr. Niharika Porwal as Aisha Khan
- Iram Badar Khan as Vidya Rai
- Shivani Singh as Shivani Dubey
- Jaihind Kumar as Madho Donald
- Ramkrishan Dhakad as Mangal singh
- Kumara Saurabh as Nanhe
- Sandeep Goyat as Vikram Dangi
- Puneet Kumar Mishra as Swadesh Rawat
- Abhishek Singh Rajput as Naman
- Anil Rastogi as Umesh Mahajan
- Sheersha Tiwari as Jyoti

== Release ==
The web series was premiered on MX Player on 15 September 2022.

== Reception ==
Roktim Rajpal of India Today rated 2 out of 5 stars and wrote "Shiksha Mandal is not a wasted effort by any stretch of the imagination. Gulshan Devaiah tries to salvage the show by giving it his all. The actor does a decent job of bringing out his character’s vulnerabilities, especially in the emotional scenes." Archika Khurana of The Times of India wrote "What does pass with distinction are the performances of the cast. Gauahar Khan, the fierce and no-nonsense cop, pulls it off in every frame with confidence and ease. It's undeniably one of her best performances to date. Gulshan Devaiah’s intense act keeps you hooked." Suchandra Bose of The Quint saw similar pattern in most of the scenes. Bose wrote "The two lead actors, Devaiah and Khan, try to hold their own as the narrative jumps from one plotline to the other. With the corrupt politicians, caricaturish villains and a holier-than-thou hero, that story lacks nothing but somehow feels overburdened with its need to be a gripping thriller." Deepa Gahlot for Rediff.com wrote "Malhotra and Devaiah act like they were aiming for an award, while the youngsters playing students are raw, so look and behave naturally." Abhimanyu Mathur of Hindustan Times wrote "The trouble with Shiksha Mandal is that it lacks subtlety and finesse. It tries to force everything with the gentleness of a jackhammer. The writing is so unimaginative and bland that several characters are reduced to repeating the same lines episode after episode, turning them into caricatures." Shubham Kulkarni of Koimoi wrote "Spoiler warning! The show ends at a point so bizarre that it just serves as a turn out than a curious angle. It ends so abrupt that you are never sure if it ended if there ever was a climax planned or the makers just forgot to give us the final episode."
