= Tassnim Sheikh =

Indian television actress

- Occupation: Actress
- Years active: 1997–2012; 2017–2023; 2025
- Spouse: Sameer Nerurkar (m. 2006)
- Children: 1

Tassnim Sheikh, also known as Tanisha Nerurkar, is an Indian actress, best known for her comic antagonistic roles as Mohini Harsh Virani in Ekta Kapoor's Kyunki Saas Bhi Kabhi Bahu Thi and as Rakhi Dave in Director's Kut Productions' Anupamaa.

== Personal life ==
Tasneem Sheik was born to a Muslim family in Jammu and Kashmir on 4 August 1980. She married Sameer Nerurkar, a merchant Navy officer in 2006. They have a daughter named Tia, who inspired her to return to the industry after 6 years.

In 2021, Sheikh was tested positive for COVID-19.

=== Religion ===
Sheikh converted to Hinduism from Islam after marriage, and changed her name to Tanisha Nerurkar. She is a devotee of Ganesha and often visits Siddhivinayak Temple on Tuesdays. She defines herself "a God-fearing person [who] respect all religions. I have been to Vaishnodevi temple, Haji Ali dargah and Mount Mary church too."

== Career ==
She moved to Mumbai with her family at an early age. After taking training in Mumbai, she began her career as a support entertainer and television presenter with sequential Gharana. In 2006. Sheikh began her career with the TV show, Saturday Suspense in 1997. Early in her career, she appeared in shows such as Kyunki Saas Bhi Kabhi Bahu Thi, Kkusum and Kasautii Zindagii Kay. She has also done a Gujarati film, Natasamarat.

She designed her own costumes while acting in Ek Vivah Aisa Bhi.

Sheikh has gained attention for often playing negative characters. In 2017, she revealed she refrains from taking positive roles as they "lack versatility".

== Television ==
| Year | Serial | Role | Notes |
|---|---|---|---|
| 1997 | Saturday Suspense | | |
| 2000–2001 | Ghar Ek Mandir | Meenakshi | |
| 2000–2001 | Babul Ki Duwayen Leti Jaa | Naina | |
| 2001–2003 | Gharana | | |
| 2001–2003 | Kkusum | Jyoti Deshmukh / Jyoti Vishal Mehra | |
| 2001–2003 | Kasautii Zindagii Kay | Kajol Basu / Kajol Mahesh Sharma | |
| 2002–2004; 2005 | Kumkum – Ek Pyara Sa Bandhan | Renuka Bajaj | Negative Role |
| 2003 | Krishna Arjun | Jumaana | |
| 2004 | Ssshhhh...Koi Hai | Barfika / Jalikaa | |
| 2004–2005 | Des Mein Niklla Hoga Chand | Priya Mathur | Negative Role |
| 2004–2008 | Kyunki Saas Bhi Kabhi Bahu Thi | Mohini Mittal / Mohini Harsh Virani | Negative Role |
| 2005 | Siddhant | Shruti | |
| 2005 | Raat Hone Ko Hai | Monica | |
| 2007 | Durgesh Nandinii | Dheeraj's wife | |
| 2008–2009 | Kis Desh Mein Hai Meraa Dil | Daljeet Balwant Mann | |
| 2010 | Meethi Choori No 1 | Contestant | |
| 2012 | Imtihaan | Seema | |
| 2017 | Ek Vivaah Aisa Bhi | Sindoora Akash Mittal | |
| 2018–2019 | Dastaan-E-Mohabbat Salim Anarkali | Ruqaiya Sultan Begum | |
| 2020–2023 | Anupamaa | Rakhi Dave | |
| 2022 | Ravivaar With Star Parivaar | Rakhi Dave | Episode 2/5/9/12/13/16 |
| 2025 | Udne Ki Aasha | Pari | |
