= Jassi Jaissi Koi Nahin =

Indian TV soap opera series

- Based on: Yo soy Betty, la fea by Fernando Gaitán
- Written by: Jay Verma
- Story by: Fernando Gaitán
- Directed by: Tony Singh; Deeya Singh; Rajan Shahi
- Starring: Mona Singh
- Music by: Abhijeet Hegdepatil
- Opening theme: Jassi Jaissi Koi Nahin by Shaan
- Country of origin: India
- No. of seasons: 1
- No. of episodes: 550

Production
- Running time: 22 minutes
- Production company: DJ's a Creative Unit

Original release
- Network: Sony Entertainment Television
- Release: 1 September 2003 – 4 May 2006

Jassi Jaissi Koi Nahin (transl. There is no one like Jassi) is an Indian soap opera which aired on Sony TV from 1 September 2003 to 4 May 2006. The series was an adaptation of the Colombian drama Yo soy Betty, la fea.

== Plot ==
Based largely on the show, Yo soy Betty, la fea, the show follows the life of Jasmeet Walia known as Jassi (Mona Singh) who is a plain-looking young woman from a middle-class family in Mumbai. Jassi is a sincere worker and has been working to support her family. She is naive but intelligent. She has always been supported and encouraged by her father, grandmother (Bebe), and her close friend Nandu (Gaurav Gera) but she has faced rejection largely from society simply because of her looks. Jassi somehow lands her dream job at Gulmohur, a big fashion empire. She is appointed as the secretary to Armaan Suri (Apurva Agnihotri) and after a rough start soon becomes indispensable at work. She falls in love with Armaan but keeps her feelings to herself.

The show follows how Jassi becomes successful at Gulmohur but must face difficulties and trouble created by several people unhappy with her success, one of whom is Armaan's arrogant girlfriend Mallika (Rakshanda Khan). She is forced to disappear when things get too murky and is saved by businessman Purab Mehra (Samir Soni) who eventually becomes responsible for Jassi's makeover so she can hide her real identity and avenge the wrongs done to her and her family. Meanwhile, Armaan falls in love with Jassi, and while mourning her disappearance, is inexplicably attracted to her alter ego Jessica Bedi. In the end, Armaan and Jassi unite and gain control of Gulmohur.

== Cast ==
- Mona Singh as Jasmeet Walia (Jassi), also called Chasmish Chuhiya in negative tone / Jessica Bedi (model of Gulmohar & Jasmin Collection) / Neha Shastri (history and drama teacher) / Vedika's adoptive mother. She is an economist and Chairman Personal assistant with secretary in Gulmohar. Apparently ugly woman but very skilled in economics with a good CV. She is the pride of her father. She is in love with Armaan Suri but when she gets a new look, Armaan marries her, Armaan's wife.
- Apurva Agnihotri as Armaan Suri, the heir to the Gulmohar business empire who starts out as a rich and arrogant businessman, Jassi's lover/husband abba Vedika's adoptive father. He is a chairman of Gulmohar. Inept playboy with only knowledge in industrial engineering who presents a risky and ambitious proposal with which he wins the presidency of Gulmohar. Managing it brings the company to the brink of bankruptcy.
- Rakshanda Khan as Mallika Seth. She is a fashionista and Armaan's girlfriend from a well to do business family, main antagonist, Armaan's fiancée and Gulmohar's stockholder and point-of-sale manager. She is not really bad but a woman full of dignity who loves Armaan and hates lovers of Armaan. She hates Jassi as she covers up his constant infidelities.
- Parmeet Sethi as Raj Malhotra. He is Armaan's best friend and Gulmohar's commercial vice president. Playboy inveterate enemy of commitments and fatherhood.
- Gaurav Gera as Nandan Verma (Nandu), Jassi's best friend
- Manini Mishra as Pari Kapadia. She is the antagonist; Mallika's best friend and secretary. Divorced woman, refined and superficial, as well as a materialist who is looking for a rich husband. Armaan hates her because she is a silly blonde and knows that Mallika wants her as Armaan's secretary to watch over her infidelities.
- Jayati Bhatia as Bindiya, Jassi's friend
- Pushtiie Shakti as Maithili, Jassi's friend
- Pubali Sanyal as Nazneen, Jassi's friend
- Shabnam Sayed as Maria, Jassi's friend
- Trishala as Trishala, Jassi's friend
- Uttara Baokar as Jassi's grandmother who she fondly calls Bebe
- Virendra Saxena as Balwant Walia (Billoo), Jassi's father who has always encouraged her
- Surinder Kaur as Amrit Walia, Jassi's mother
- Amar Talwar as Purushottam Suri, Armaan's father
- Mahru Sheikh as Ila Suri, Armaan's mother
- Samir Soni as Purab Mehra, a successful businessman who helps Jassi overcome her fears and knows her identity all along
- Zain Khan as Rohan
- Shyam Pathak (episode 186) as Raddiwala
- Vinay Jain as Aryan Seth, Mallika's brother and Armaan's nemesis who will go to any lengths to get control of the Gulmohar empire. Vedika's father.
- Rajesh Khera as Maddy, Gulmohar's fashion designer
- Navneet Nishan as Hansmukhi
- Shweta Salve as Arundhati Roy
- Vrajesh Hirjee as Computer Hacker
- Raman Trikha as Lucky
- Sandhya Mridul as Yaana
- Sandhya Shetty as Kareena Modi
- Anupama Verma as Sheetal Ambuja
- Mandira Bedi as herself
- Nethra Raghuraman as herself
- Divya Dutta as herself
- Karan Oberoi as himself and Raghav Oberoi
- Vikas Bhalla as Chiranjeev (CJ) Oberoi, an antagonist
- Neena Gupta as Nandini
- Rakhee Tandon as Anjali (Angel) Suri, Armaan's sister
- Aman Verma as Advocate Thakral
- Sakshi Tanwar as Advocate Indira Bhargav
- Rohit Bakshi as Rahul
- Shilpa Saklani as Vidhi Vedika's Mother
- Chinky Jaiswal as Vedika Vidhi's Daughter / Jassi Anna Armaan's adoptive daughter
- Nitin Arora as Detective
- Gauri Pradhan Tejwani as Gauri Pradhan
- Vikram Sahu as Dhanraj
- Shweta Kawatra as Meenakshi
- Niyati Joshi as Jyoti (Jo) Khatri
- Pooja Ghai Rawal as Riya
- Uday Tikekar as Father Rodricks
- Sanjay Batra as Public Prosecutor
- Kanwaljit Singh as Shiv Pratap Oberoi
- Shubhavi Choksey as Meera Oberoi
- Salil Acharya as Armaan's cousin
- Kishori Shahane as Doctor
- Ketki Dave as Vrinda Khatri
- Sooraj Thapar as Charles
- Rajesh Khattar as Parvatlal Singh
- Apara Mehta as Naseem Aapa
- Sanjay Batra as Advocate Rajkumar Jha
- Neeru Bajwa as Neha Shastri

=== Guest appearances ===
- Saif Ali Khan as Karan Kapoor: To promote his film Hum Tum (May 2004)
- Malaika Arora for L'Oréal Paris Fashion Fiesta advertisement in episode no 275
- Vandana Luthra as herself in Episode 306
- Rupali Tiwari as herself from NDTV News Host in Episode 343
- Neeta Lulla Designed Jassi's Bridal Outfit
- Neelam Kothari – designed Jassi's bridal jewellery

== Development ==
Jassi Jaisi Koi Nahi is also known for its remarkable campaigning and marketing done by the channel to attract a huge audience before its launch. The main protagonist 'Jasmeet Walia' was hidden completely from the audience in promotions although the campaigning was focused on the character's uniqueness. This generated a lot of curiosity among its audience to know about the character. This was the first an Indian Television Channel took such a big risk to keep its series protagonist under wraps and still promoting it heavily. The risk paid off and the show opened with a bumper response on its premiere episode. The TV show was well received and it went on to run for three years.

== Reception ==
A special episode aired on 5 March 2005 garnered 10.9 TVR.

== Awards and nominations ==
Year	Award	Category	Recipient	Role	Result
2003	Apsara Awards	Best Actress in Drama Series	Mona Singh	Jasmeet Walia	Won
2003	Apsara Awards	Best Drama Series	Jassi Jaissi Koi Nahin		Won
2003	Apsara Awards	Best Director-Drama Series	Rohit Khanna		Won
2003	Apsara Awards	Outstanding Debut	Mona Singh	Jasmeet Walia	Won
2004	Indian Telly Awards	Best Child Artiste (Male)	Zain Khan	Rohan	Won
2004	Indian Telly Awards	Best Comic Actor (Female)	Manini De	Pari	Won
2004	Indian Telly Awards	Best Actor in Supporting Role (Female)	Rakshanda Khan	Mallika Seth	Won
2004	Indian Telly Awards	Television Personality of The Year (Female)	Mona Singh	Jasmeet Walia	Won
2004	Indian Telly Awards	Best Actress (Female)	Mona Singh	Jasmeet Walia	Won
2004	Indian Telly Awards	TV Programme of The Year	Jassi Jaissi Koi Nahin		Won
2004	Indian Television Academy Awards	Best Serial – Drama (Jury)	Jassi Jaissi Koi Nahin		Won
2004	Indian Television Academy Awards	Best Actress (Popular)	Mona Singh	Jasmeet Walia	Won
2005	Indian Telly Awards	Best Actress (Female)	Mona Singh	Jasmeet Walia	Won
2005	Indian Telly Awards	Best Actor (Male)	Apurva Agnihotri	Arman Suri	Won
2005	Indian Telly Awards	Best Actor in Negative Role (Female)	Rakshanda Khan	Mallika Seth	Won
2005	Indian Telly Awards	Best Daily Serial	Jassi Jaissi Koi Nahin		Won
2005	Indian Television Academy Awards	Best Actress – Drama (Jury)	Mona Singh	Jasmeet Walia	Won
