= Sachin Tyagi =

Indian television actor and singer

- Occupations: Actor; singer
- Years active: 2003–present
- Notable work: Tere Sheher Mein (2015); Swaragini – Jodein Rishton Ke Sur (2015–2016); Yeh Rishta Kya Kehlata Hai (2016–2025)
- Spouse: Rakshanda Khan (m. 2014)
- Children: 3

Sachin Tyagi is an Indian Hindi television actor and singer, he is known for playing Manish Goenka in India's longest running daily soap Yeh Rishta Kya Kehlata Hai for more than 8 years. He is married to actress Rakshanda Khan.

== Personal life ==
Tyagi belongs to Hindu Brahmin family from Meerut, Uttar Pradesh.

Tyagi has two daughters from his first marriage. He met actress Rakshanda Khan in 2006, on the set of the show Kuch Apne Kuch Paraye. They dated for seven years and got married in 2014. Khan gave birth to their daughter in December 2014.

In August 2020, Tyagi tested positive for COVID-19, but he recovered by September.

== Career ==
Tyagi came to Mumbai in 1993, initially working as a car trader; he aspired to become a singer. He launched an album in 2003, which according to him "did fairly well". He subsequently ventured into acting in television shows, beginning with Family Business and Tumhari Disha (both 2004). Trained in classical music by maestro Upendra Verma, he won the singing reality show Jjhoom India in 2007, alongside his partner Madhushree, beating Varun Badola.

Tyagi played Ravana in the 2012 television adaptation of the Hindu epic Ramayana. The fantasy show The Adventures of Hatim (2013) featured him as King Hubal, opposite Nausheen Ali Sardar. He also appeared as Rishi Mathur in Tere Sheher Mein (2015), and as Shekhar Gadodia in Swaragini – Jodein Rishton Ke Sur (2015–16).

Tyagi gained prominence with his portrayal of Manish Goenka in Rajan Shahi's TV series Yeh Rishta Kya Kehlata Hai. Tyagi had been playing Manish Goenka since 2016, making his role span 3 generations of the longest-running daily soap of India. He played Kartik Goenka's father, Akshara Sharma's grandfather and Abhira Poddar's great-grandfather in the series. In May 2025, following a 7-year leap in the series, his character was shown shifted to Japan, after which he has not made any appearance in the show, confirming his exit.

== Television ==
Year	Serial	Role
2004–2005	Family Business	Jay Chauhan
2005–2006	Tumhari Disha	Vedant Sehgal
2006–2007	Kuch Apne Kuch Paraye	Yash Raichand
2007	Thodi Si Zameen Thoda Sa Aasmaan	Prashant
2007–2008	Solhah Singaarr	Sumer Chaturvedi
2012–2013	Ramayan	Ravan
2013	The Adventures of Hatim	King Hubal
2015	Tere Sheher Mein	Rishi Mathur
2015–2016	Swaragini – Jodein Rishton Ke Sur	Shekhar Gadodia
2016–2025	Yeh Rishta Kya Kehlata Hai	Manish Goenka
2022	Woh Toh Hai Albelaa	Balwant Sharma
2022	Anupama: Namaste America	Narrator
2026–present	Anupamaa	Digvijay Sood

=== Web Series ===
Year	Show	Role roll	Channel	Notes	Co–Star
2026	Jab Zodiacs Met – Taurus	Chetan (Episode 3)	YouTube	Episodic Role	Urvashi Dholakia

=== Reality Shows ===
Year	Show	Role	Co–Star
2008	Kabhi Kabhii Pyaar Kabhi Kabhii Yaar	Host	Rakshanda Khan

== Dubbing roles ==
Film title	Actor	Character	Original language	Dub language	Original release year	Dub release year	Notes
Bigil	Vijay	Rayappan (Anthony in Hindi version) and Michael "Bigil"	Tamil	Hindi	2019	2022	
Varisu	Vijay	Vijay Rajendran	Tamil	Hindi	2023	2023	

== See also ==
- List of Hindi television actors
