= Sheersha Tiwari =

Actress

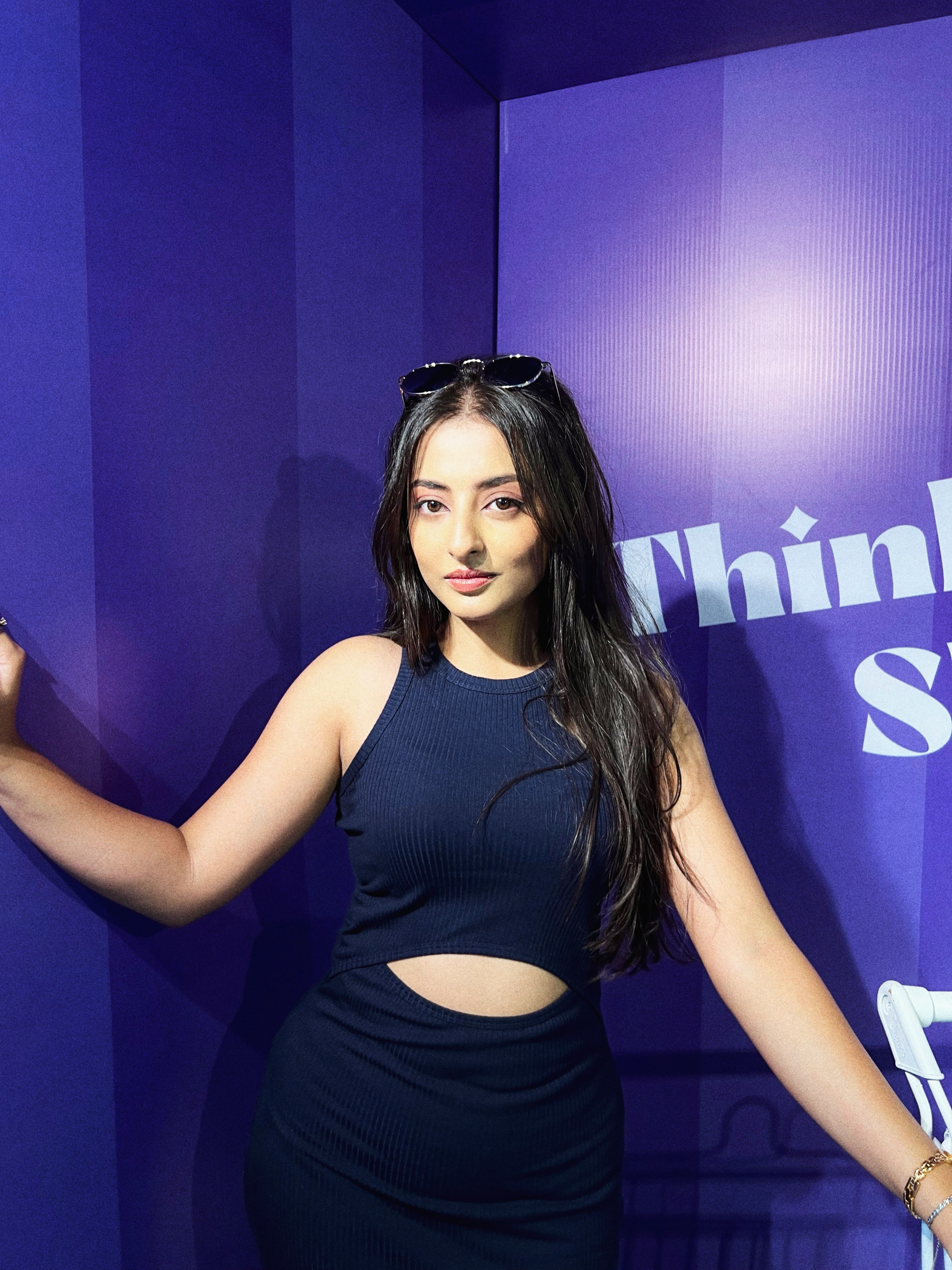
- Occupation: Actress
- Years active: 2018–present
- Known for: Anupamaa

Sheersha Tiwari is an Indian television actress best known for her role in Rajan Shahi's drama series Anupamaa, where she portrays the character of Prarthana Kothari.

== Filmography ==
=== Television ===
Year	Title	Role	Notes	Ref.
2022	Bhago Bhago Bhoot Aaya	Ritu	Lead	
2023	Saubhagyavati Bhava	Rashmi Sharma		
2024–2025	Shrimad Ramayan	Mandavi		
2024–2026	Anupamaa	Prathna Kothari		
2026–present	Ishq Junooni	Ishani Roy	Lead	

=== Webseries ===
Year	Title	Role
2021	Shiksha Mandal	Jyoti
