= Kuch Apne Kuch Paraye =

Indian TV series

- Genre: Drama
- Written by: Dimple Hirji
- Directed by: Ajay Kumar
- Creative director: Ajit Dandekar
- Starring: see below
- Opening theme: "Kuch Apne Kuch Paraye" by Alka Yagnik
- Country of origin: India
- Original language: Hindi
- No. of seasons: 1
- No. of episodes: 89

Production
- Producer: Naveed Antulay
- Cinematography: Ravi Mishra; Satish Shetty
- Editors: Lalit Tiwari; Varun Mehndiratta
- Running time: 24 minutes

Original release
- Network: Sahara One
- Release: 20 November 2006 – 15 March 2007

Kuch Apne Kuch Paraye is an Indian television series that aired on Sahara One in 2006, based on the concept of whether a daughter-in-law ever become the daughter of the house. The story traces a young woman named Krishna's life and her struggle for acceptance as the daughter of her in-laws' family. The series aired weekdays at 10:30pm

== Plot ==
The story is of a prominent and conservative business tycoon Vijaypath Raichand — father of seven children and a strict disciplinarian by nature. The show revolves around his daughter-in-law Krishna, married to his second son Abhay who leaves her and the house without stating any reasons. Ego clashes and disputes within the family see Raichand’s children leaving him one by one. Krishna’s sole aim is to bring her family back together as she loves Vijaypath Raichand unconditionally. He, in turn, perceives her as his own daughter. When she is accepted by Raichand this way, the women of the family loathe this fact thereby maintaining constant angst against her. Will the other family members accept her as their daughter?

== Cast ==
- Gunjan Walia as Krishna Abhay Raichand
- Vikram Gokhale as Vijaypath (VP) Raichand
- Ankur Nayyar as Yuvraj (Yuvi) Raichand
- Chaitanya Choudhury as Uday Raichand
- Puneet Sachdev as Kabir Raichand
- Tarun Khanna as Aditya Raichand
- Sachin Tyagi as Yash Raichand
- Rakshanda Khan as Tara Yash Raichand
- Diwakar Pundir as Abhay Raichand
- Madhuri Bhatia as Maya Raichand (Bua) - Vijaypath's Sister
