= Tumhari Disha =

Indian drama television series

- The promotional logo image of "Tumhari Disha".
- Created by: Rupali Guha
- Written by: Bobby Bhonsle, Amit Senchoudhary
- Directed by: Yash Chauhan
- Starring: see below
- Opening theme: "Tumhari Disha" by
- Country of origin: India
- No. of seasons: 1
- No. of episodes: 450

Production
- Running time: approx. 23 minutes

Original release
- Network: Zee TV
- Release: 22 August 2004 – 10 August 2006

Tumhari Disha is an Indian drama television series produced by Filmfarm India that premiered on 22 August 2004 on Zee TV. It is based on the life of a girl named Disha and the moments that changed her life forever.

== Plot ==
Vijayendra and Suhasini Bhosle have raised their two daughters Disha and Rano as equals - well almost equals. However, a dark secret from the past threatens to create a rift between the two sisters. When Suhasini realizes that Rano is in love with Inder, while Inder is keen to marry Disha, she lets the cat out of the bag. She discloses that Disha is not their biological child but their servant's child.

Dushyant Sehgal aka DK, a powerful diamond merchant, asks Disha to pose in the nude for his jewellery advertisement. Disha refuses the proposal. However destiny has something else in store for Disha. Vijayendra Bhosle meets with an accident and dies, leaving the family in dire straits. Disha is left with no choice but to accept DK's proposal; however, she poses the condition that DK will have to marry her.

The relationship, which had started on a sour note, takes a turn when DK realizes that he loves Disha. Jealousy and possessiveness adds spice to the growing relationship between Disha and Dk. Gargi, DK's step mother, is a cunning and shrewd lady who wants to grab DK's business empire for herself.

Disha and Dk manage to survive through all the odds. However, DK meets with an accident, which leaves him paralyzed waist down. DK is so devastated that he wants Disha to move on in her life. He encourages disha to marry someone else; however Disha chooses to be DK's for all her life. She ends her life before she can be forced to marry someone else. Before dying, Disha makes DK promise to get on with life.

DK gets well and does as promised. He marries a simpleton named Kamna and has three children—Dhan, Veer and Dhruvi. Dk still lives with the memories of his first wife Disha. He pampers his children and completely ignores Kamna. When the children grow up, Dhan gets engaged to Surily, who is a very shrewd and cunning person. DK starts receiving threats to stop the wedding, but keeps ignoring them. The day of the wedding arrives.DK gets kidnapped before the wedding...

== Cast ==
- Chhavi Mittal as Disha Bhonsle / Disha Dushyant Kumar Sehgal
- Ashish Nayyar as Dushyant Kumar "D. K." Sehgal
- Zarina Wahab as Suhasini Vijayendra Bhonsle (Disha's Stepmother)
- Kanwaljit Singh as Vijayendra Bhonsle (Disha's Stepfather)
- Krutika Desai Khan as Gargi Sehgal (D.K.'s Stepmother)
- Sudha Chandran as Vasundara Malik (Disha's Mother)
- Sachin Sharma / Sachin Tyagi as Vedant Sehgal (D.K.'s Stepbrother)
- Manish Raisinghan as Veer
- Sandeep Bhanushali as Dhan
- Kavita Kaushik as Porineeta
- Pallavi Subhash as Preeta
- Poonam Joshi as Kamna Dushyant Kumar Sehgal
- Karishma Randhawa / Tasneem Khan / Soni Singh as Rano Bhonsle
- Prithvi Zutshi as Jay Malhotra
- Yash Sinha as Sameer
- Sikandar Kharbanda as Rocky
- Usha Bachani as Sushmita
- Mukul Nag as Prtivi Singh
- Jayant Rawal as Manish
- Monalika Bhonsle as Saraswati
- Raj Logani as Chandra Mohan
- Kartik Sabharwal as Abhinav
- Prashant Chawla as Dev Narayan Malik
- Anjana Mumtaz as Sumitra Sehgal (D.K.'s biological mother)
- Chayonika as Shekhar
- Dimple as Sadhana
- Ravi Patwardhan as Jagdish Khurana
- Sukanya Kulkarni as
- Shweta Bhonsle as Anita
- Sonia Singh
- Kshitee Jog
- Brinda Parekh
