= Rakshanda Khan =

Indian television actress

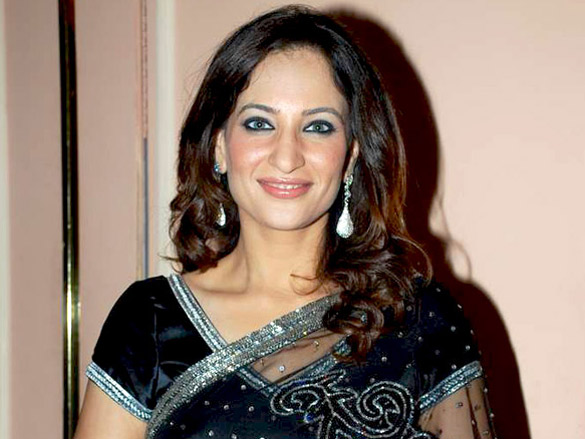
- Khan in 2012
- Born: 27 September 1974 (age 52); Mumbai, Maharashtra, India
- Occupation: Actress
- Notable work: Jassi Jaissi Koi Nahin; Kyunki Saas Bhi Kabhi Bahu Thi; Kasamh Se; Naagin 3
- Spouse: Sachin Tyagi (m. 2014)
- Children: 1

Rakshanda Khan Tyagi (born 27 September 1974) is an Indian actress who works in Indian television and a voice actress in live-action and animated films.

== Personal life ==
Khan is married to actor Sachin Tyagi, a father of two daughters from his first marriage. Khan met Tyagi on the sets of the television show Kuch Apne Kuch Paraye in 2006 and got married on 15 March 2014 in Mumbai. Together the couple have a daughter who was born in December 2014.

== Dubbing roles ==
=== Live action films ===
Title	Actress	Character	Dub language	Original language	Original year release	Dub year release	Notes
The Mummy	Rachel Weisz	Evelyn Carnahan	Hindi	English; Arabic; Ancient Egyptian	1999	1999	
Total Recall	Jessica Biel	Melina	Hindi	English	2012	2012	

==== Indian films ====
Title	Actress	Character	Dub language	Original language	Original year release	Dub year release	Notes
Oh! Baby	Samantha Ruth Prabhu	Young Savithri alias "Baby" / Swathi	Hindi	Telugu	2019	2023	
Sir	Samyuktha Menon	Meenakshi	Hindi	Telugu	2023	2023	
Virupaksha	Samyuktha Menon	Nandini	Hindi	Telugu	2023	2023	
Vinaya Vidheya Rama	Kiara Advani	Sita	Hindi	Telugu	2019	2023	

=== Animated films ===
Title	Original Voice(s)	Character(s)	Dub Language	Original Language	Original Year release	Dub Year release	Notes
The Incredibles	Holly Hunter	Helen Parr / Elastigirl	Hindi	English	2004	2004	The Hindi dub released as "Hum Hain Lajawab". Kajol dubbed this role in sequel.

== Television ==
Year	Serial	Role	Notes	Ref.
2000	Thriller At 10		Episodic Role	
2003	Kya Hadsaa Kya Haqeeqat – Kaboo	Devyani	Episode 74–98	
2003–2005	Jassi Jaissi Koi Nahin	Mallika Seth Suri		
2004–2008	Kyunki Saas Bhi Kabhi Bahu Thi	Tanya Malhotra Virani		
2005	Kasautii Zindagii Kay	Advocate Madhura Lokhande	Cameo	
2006	Kasamh Se	Roshni Chopra		
2006-2007	Kuch Apne Kuch Paraye	Tara Yash Raichand		
2007	Kaajjal	Kamayani Bhasin		
2008	Kahaani Hamaaray Mahaabhaarat Ki	Amba		
2009	Kitani Mohabbat Hai	Advocate Ganga Rai		
2011–2012	Devon Ke Dev...Mahadev	Madanike		
2011–2012	Phulwa	Advocate Roshni Mukherjee		
2012–2013	Jhilmil Sitaroon Ka Aangan Hoga	Kusum Sharma / Damini		
2013	Bade Achhe Lagte Hain	Esha Singhania		
2016–2017	Brahmarakshas	Mohini Nigam Srivastav		
2018–2019	Naagin 3	Nidhog Vansh Naagin/Sumitra Sehgal		
2020–2021	Durga – Mata Ki Chhaya	Damini Aneja		
2021–2022	Tere Bina Jiya Jaye Na	Jayalakshmi "Jaya" Bhuvan Singh		
2022–2023	Janam Janam Ka Saath	Dr. Karuna Tomar		
2024	Pracchand Ashok	Rajmata Helena Maurya		
2025	Dhaakad Beera	Bhanwari Devi Chaudhary		

== Other television shows ==
- Meethi Choori No 1 - Contestant
- Kabhi Kabhii Pyaar Kabhi Kabhii Yaar - Host
- Jodi Kamaal Ki - Host
- Indian Idol 2 Taka tak - Host
- The Music Show: The Real Countdown, Indipop countdown show directed by Ken Ghosh, on EL TV - Host

== Web series ==
Year	Title	Role	Platform	Notes
2019	Ragini MMS Returns	Bharti Verma	ALTBalaji and ZEE5	
2020	Peshawar	Fatima	Ullu	Based on 2014 Peshawar school massacre
