= Gaurav Khanna =

Indian actor (born 1981)

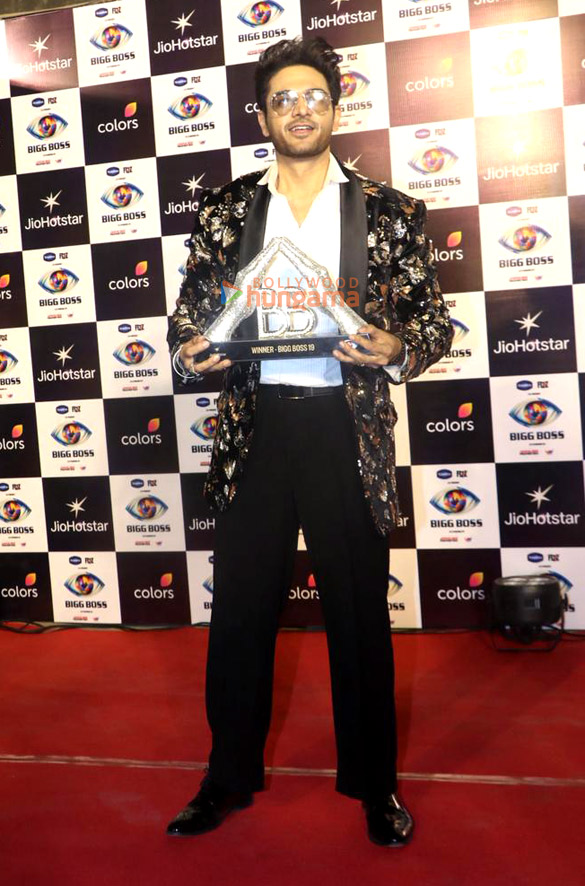
- Khanna in 2025
- Born: 11 December 1981 (age 44); Kanpur, Uttar Pradesh, India
- Education: Dr. Virendra Swarup Education Centre, Kanpur (MBA)
- Occupation: Actor
- Years active: 2005–present
- Notable work: Yeh Pyar Na Hoga Kam; CID; Anupamaa; Celebrity MasterChef India; Bigg Boss 19

Gaurav Khanna (born 11 December 1981) is an Indian actor who works in Hindi television. He has appeared in several successful television shows, including CID, Anupamaa, which earned him the Indian Telly Award for Best Actor in a Lead Role, and the romantic drama Yeh Pyar Na Hoga Kam. In 2025, Khanna won Celebrity MasterChef India and Bigg Boss 19. In 2026, he participated in Khatron Ke Khiladi 15.

== Early life ==
Khanna spent almost a year working as a marketing manager for an IT company before entering the entertainment sector. He had a solid professional foundation from his schooling and work experience, which he later applied to his acting career.

== Career ==
He began his acting career by appearing in television commercials.

His first appearance on television was in Bhabhi. He next appeared in Kumkum – Ek Pyara Sa Bandhan. Khanna's first lead role was in Meri Doli Tere Angana in 2007. He rose to prominence with his roles as Neil Fernandez in Jeevan Saathi – Humsafar Zindagi Ke, Abeer Bajpayee in Yeh Pyar Na Hoga Kam, Inspector Kavin in CID, Dr. Akshay Sinha in Tere Bin and Prince Virendra Singh in Prem Ya Paheli – Chandrakanta. He gained widespread attention for portraying Anuj Kapadia in Anupamaa from 2021 to 2024.

Khanna's first reality show appearance was in Celebrity MasterChef India in 2025, which he won. He subsequently participated in Colors TV's reality show Bigg Boss 19 and emerged as the winner.

== Personal life ==
In early 2016, Khanna was revealed to be dating television actress Akanksha Chamola. The couple married on 24 November 2016 in Khanna's hometown of Kanpur.

In 2025, he revealed on Celebrity MasterChef that he is colour-blind. He was also the only vegetarian contestant on the show.

In 2026, on the premiere of Netflix reality series, Lock Upp: Sach Ya Sazaa, Chamola revealed that she and Khanna had been living separately for a year and would be getting a divorce.

== Filmography ==
=== Television ===
Year	Title	Role	Notes	Ref.
2005	Siddhanth	Tanmay Bakshi		
2006	Bhabhi	Bhuvan Sareen		
2006–2007	Kumkum – Ek Pyara Sa Bandhan	Sharman Wadhwa		
2007	Jamegi Jodi.com	Rahul		
	Ssshhhh...Phir Koi Hai	Ritesh	Episode 55 - Kharkhana	
2007–2008	Meri Doli Tere Angana	Ruhaan Oberoi		
2007–2008	Ardhangini – Ek Khoobsurat Jeevan Saathi	Nivaan Banerjee		
2007–2009	Santaan	Shubh Dixit		
2008	Jalwa Four 2 Ka 1	Contestant		
	Ssshhhh...Phir Koi Hai	Virendra	Episode 96 & 97 - Divyaastra	
	Ssshhhh...Phir Koi Hai	Yuvraaj	Episode 112 & 113 - Saaye Ki Dehshat	
2008–2009	Jeevan Saathi – Humsafar Zindagi Ke	Neil Fernandez		
2009	Dancing Queen	Himself		
2009–2010	Love Ne Mila Di Jodi	Prithvi Saxena		
2009–2010	Yeh Pyar Na Hoga Kam	Abeer Bajpayee		
2010–2011	Dil Se Diya Vachan	Prem Rajadhyaksha		
2011	Nachle Ve with Saroj Khan	Host		
2012	Byaah Hamari Bahoo Ka	Gopikishan "Krish" Vaishnav / Satya		
2014	CID	Senior Inspector Kavin		
2014–2015	Box Cricket League 1	Participant		
2015	Hazir Jawab Birbal	Birbal		
2016	Box Cricket League 2	Participant		
2016	Comedy Classes	Various characters		
2016	Tere Bin	Dr. Akshay Sinha		
2017	Prem Ya Paheli – Chandrakanta	Rajkumar Virendra Singh / Maharaj Harshvardhan		
2019–2020	Apna News Aayega	Various characters		
2021–2024	Anupamaa	Anuj "AK" Kapadia		
2022	Ravivaar With Star Parivaar	Anuj "AK" Kapadia		
2022	The Socho Project	Rahul Kishore	Unreleased	
2022	Anupama: Namaste America	Anuj "AK" Kapadia	Cameo; Episode 11	
2025	Celebrity MasterChef India	Contestant	Winner	
2025	Bigg Boss 19	Contestant	Winner	
2026	Khatron Ke Khiladi 15	Contestant	10th place	
2026–present	Dil Ki Bewafaiyaan	Manav		

==== Special appearances ====
Year	Title	Role	Notes	Ref.
2004	Studio One	Sunny	Episode 1	
2007	Mano Ya Na Mano	Aditya	Episode 57	
2007	Ssshhhh...Phir Koi Hai	Ritesh	Episode 55	
2008	Ssshhhh...Phir Koi Hai	Rajkumar	Episodes 96-97	
2008	Ssshhhh...Phir Koi Hai	Unknown	Episodes 112-113	
2011	Sasural Simar Ka	Host Of Dancing Competition		
2014	Taarak Mehta Ka Ooltah Chashmah	Senior Inspector Kavin		
2016	Gangaa	Dr. Sameer Mirza	Photograph only	
2016	Darr Sabko Lagta Hai	Saket / Sarthak	Double role, Episode 30	
2018–2020	Laal Ishq	Dr. Avinash	Episode 4	
2018–2020	Laal Ishq	Sunil	Episode 70	
2018–2020	Laal Ishq	Raghav	Episode 167	
2018–2020	Laal Ishq	Jaggu	Episode 201	
2020	Savdhaan India	ATS Officer Devdutt	Episodes 30-31	
2021	Mauka-E-Vardaat	Senior Inspector Gaurav Rajput	Episodes 53/55/57	
2022	Yeh Rishta Kya Kehlata Hai	Anuj "AK" Kapadia		
2024	Yeh Rishta Kya Kehlata Hai	Anuj "AK" Kapadia		
2025	Iss Ishq Ka Rabb Rakha	Host of the Holi event		
2025	Ghum Hai Kisikey Pyaar Meiin	Host of the Holi event		
2026	Laughter Chefs – Unlimited Entertainment season 3	Himself		

== Awards and nominations ==
Year	Award	Category	Work	Result	Ref.
2022	21st Indian Television Academy Awards	Best Actor Popular	Anupamaa	Nominated	
2022	Gold Awards	Best Actor in a Leading Role	Anupamaa	Nominated	
2022	Gold Awards	Best Popular Actor	Anupamaa	Nominated	

== See also ==
- List of Indian television actors
