= Anupamaa =

2020 Indian family drama television series

- Genre: Drama; Soap opera
- Created by: Rajan Shahi
- Developed by: Leena Gangopadhyay
- Written by: Dialogue: Aparajita Sharma; Divy Nidhi Sharma
- Screenplay by: Bhavna Vyas
- Story by: Namita Vartak; Zama Habib
- Directed by: Romesh Kalra
- Creative director: Ketaki Walawalkar
- Starring: Rupali Ganguly; Sudhanshu Pandey; Madalsa Sharma; Gaurav Khanna; Shivam Khajuria; Adrija Roy
- Opening theme: "Anupamaa"
- Country of origin: India
- Original language: Hindi
- No. of seasons: 1
- No. of episodes: 2,205

Production
- Producers: Rajan Shahi; Deepa Shahi; Vipin Reshammiya
- Cinematography: Gulshan Shah
- Camera setup: Multi-camera
- Running time: 30—34 minutes
- Production company: Director's Kut Productions

Original release
- Network: StarPlus
- Release: 13 July 2020 – present

Related
- Aai Kuthe Kay Karte; Sreemoyee; Anupama: Namaste America; Yeh Rishta Kya Kehlata Hai

Anupamaa is an Indian Hindi-language television drama series that premiered on 13 July 2020 on StarPlus and streams digitally on Disney+ Hotstar. Produced by Rajan Shahi and Deepa Shahi under the banner of Director's Kut Productions, it is a remake of Star Jalsha's Bengali series Sreemoyee. It is one of the longest-running Indian television soap operas. Rupali Ganguly plays the titular role and the series formerly starred Sudhanshu Pandey, Madalsa Sharma and Gaurav Khanna. Since October 2024, the series stars Ganguly with Adrija Roy (who replaced Alisha Parveen Khan) and Shivam Khajuria as second-generation leads.

The show revolves around Anupamaa Shah, a homemaker whose family has a low opinion of her and whose husband cheats on her. She gains more self-respect and becomes more independent. She navigates relationships and societal expectations while on her path of personal growth.

== Plot ==
Anupamaa is a middle-aged housewife who toils for her family but is always insulted by her husband, Vanraj, and her mother-in-law, Leela, for being uneducated. Anupamaa's constant emotional supports are her younger son, Samar, and her father-in-law, Hasmukh. However, on her 25th wedding anniversary, upon discovering that Vanraj has cheated on her with his colleague, Kavya, she feels heartbroken and sets out to create her identity. Meanwhile, Anupamaa's elder son, Paritosh, marries Kinjal, while Samar and Nandini, Kavya's niece, fall for each other. Anupamaa and Vanraj divorce, and he marries Kavya soon after her divorce from her husband, Aniruddh.

Anupamaa, along with Samar and Nandini, opens a dance academy due to their shared passion for dance. However, Nandini breaks up with Samar and leaves him forever because of her misunderstandings and insecurities towards him. Anupamaa later reconnects with her college classmate, Anuj Kapadia, who has been in love with her since her college days. Anupamaa eventually falls in love with Anuj, and they marry. Together, they adopt a girl, Chhoti Anu. Anupamaa struggles to balance her responsibilities between her two families. Amidst all this, Kinjal gives birth to a baby girl, Aarya, and learns that Paritosh has cheated on her, but they reconcile for the sake of their child. Anupamaa's daughter, Pakhi, marries Adhik, who is the younger brother and foster son of Anuj's sister-in-law, Barkha. Samar marries a rape victim, Dimple, who herself was divorced by her husband after her rape.

Later on, Chhoti Anu's biological mother, Maya, arrives and takes Chhoti Anu with her. Anuj and Anupamaa feel devastated on Anu's departure, and Anuj leaves Anupamaa to stay with Maya and Chhoti Anu. Maya and Barkha conspire to keep Anuj and Anupamaa apart. Later on, Anupamaa has a chance to be a part of Malti Devi's Academy, Gurukul. Malti Devi is impressed with Anupamaa's hard work and dedication, and offers her a three-year contract to work with her and declares that she would be the heir of Gurukul. Maya realizes her mistake when she tries to separate Anuj and Anupamaa and asks for their forgiveness, but a truck hits her, and Maya dies. Before leaving for America, Anupamaa learns that Anu's health has deteriorated, and she rushes back to her. This angers Malti Devi, so she expels Anupamaa from her Gurukul. Meanwhile, Kavya is pregnant with Aniruddh's child, and Vanraj learns about that and avoids her. Later on, Anupamaa finds Malti Devi roaming in the streets, in a deteriorated condition, and brings her to her house. On Anuj's birthday, the entire family is shocked to know that Malti Devi is Anuj's biological mother, but Anuj refuses to accept her. Later on, Samar is murdered at a party, leaving behind Dimple, who is pregnant with his child. Anupamaa, Vanraj, and Anuj find out Samar's murderer and have him arrested. Paritosh, Kinjal, and Aarya move out of India.

Pakhi, Barkha, and Malti Devi instigate Chhoti Anu against Anupamaa, and she goes against her, whereas Dimple meets a dancer, Tapish, and they become friends. Vanraj tells Dimple to stay away from Tapish, or else he will keep Dimple's child away from her. Kinjal, Paritosh, and Aarya return to India to celebrate Aarya's first birthday. Anupamaa comes to meet Aarya, but Vanraj asks her to leave and tells her to never return to the house. Kavya also leaves the house after Vanraj tells her that her child has no place in this house. Malti Devi and Barkha collaborate to expel Anupamaa from Anuj's life and start instigating Chhoti Anu against Anupama. Anupamaa, Kinjal, Aarya, and Chhoti Anu go out for a picnic, but the car meets with an accident. Although Anupamaa rescues everyone, she is berated by Vanraj and Paritosh. Anupamaa decides to never return to the Shah house and returns to the Kapadia house. Chhoti Anu berates Anupamaa and avoids her. Anuj feels that Anupamaa has never paid attention to Chhoti Anu and the Kapadia family, and has always paid attention to the Shah family, and feels that he has married Anupamaa hastily. Anupamaa then decides to leave Anuj and Chhoti Anu forever and leaves the house. Anuj divorces Anupamaa and renames Chhoti Anu to Aadhya and leaves India.

== Cast ==
=== Main ===
- Rupali Ganguly as Anupamaa Joshi: Kanta's daughter (2020–present)
- Sudhanshu Pandey as Vanraj Shah: Leela and Hasmukh's son (2020–2024)
- Madalsa Sharma as Kavya Shah: Aniruddh's ex-wife (2020–2024)
- Gaurav Khanna as Anuj Kapadia: Malti Devi's son (2021–2024)
- Alisha Parveen Khan / Adrija Roy as Rahi "Aadhya" Kapadia Kothari: Maya's daughter (2024–present)
  - Aurra Bhatnagar Badoni as Teenage Aadhya Kapadia (2023–2024)
    - Asmi Deo as Child Anu "Chhoti" Kapadia (2022–2023)
- Shivam Khajuria as Prem "Tinku" Kothari: Gayatri and Parag's son (2024–present)
  - Parth as Child Prem (2025)

=== Recurring ===
- Alpana Buch as Leela "Baa" Shah: Jignesh's sister (2020–present)
- Arvind Vaidya as Hasmukh "Bapuji" Shah: Leela's husband (2020–present)
- Ekta Saraiya as Dolly Shah: Leela and Hasmukh's daughter (2020–2023; 2024)
- Aashish Mehrotra / Gaurav Sharma / Manish Naggdev as Paritosh "Toshu" Shah: Anupamaa and Vanraj's elder son (2020–2024) / (2024) / (2024–present)
  - Dheer Bhanushali as Child Paritosh (2022) (archival footage of Anupama: Namaste America)
- Nidhi Shah / Milloni Kapadia as Kinjal Dave Shah: Rakhi and Pramod's daughter (2020–2024) / (2025–present)
- Paras Kalnawat / Sagar Parekh as Samar Shah: Anupamaa and Vanraj's younger son (2020–2022) / (2022–2023; 2025)
  - Vidvaan Sharma as Child Samar (2022) (archival footage of Anupama: Namaste America)
- Varun Kasturia as Ansh Shah: Dimple and Samar's son; (2024–present)
- Muskan Bamne / Chandni Bhagwanani / Krutika Desai as Pakhi "Sweety" Shah: Anupamaa and Vanraj's daughter (2020–2023) / (2024) / (2024–present)
- Sheersha Tiwari as Prarthana Kothari Shah: Gayatri and Parag's daughter; (2024–2026)
- Mehul Nisar as Bhavesh Joshi: Kanta's son; (2020–2024; 2025)
- Madhavi Gogate / Savita Prabhune as Kanta Joshi: Anupamaa and Bhavesh's mother (2020–2021) / (2021–2023; 2025)
- Yachit Sharma as Nihar Joshi: Bhavesh's son (2020)
- Paresh Bhatt as Sanjay Dhamecha: Dolly's ex-husband (2020–2022)
- Sonal Khilwani as Dr. Meenakshi "Meenu" Dhamecha: Dolly and Sanjay's daughter (2024)
  - Lavishka Gupta / Stuti Zakarde as child and teenage Meenu (2020) / (2020–2022; 2023)
- Tasneem Sheikh as Rakhi Dave: Pramod's wife (2020–2023)
- Farooq Saeed as Pramod Dave: Rakhi's husband (2020)
- Aneri Vajani as Malvika "Mukku" Kapadia: Anuj's adopted sister (2021–2022)
- Rohit Bakshi as Ankush Kapadia: Barkha's husband (2022–2024)
- Ashlesha Sawant as Barkha Mehta Kapadia: Adhik's sister (2022–2024)
- Alma Hussein as Sara Kapadia: Ankush and Barkha's daughter (2022)
- Viraj Kapoor as Romil Kapadia: Ankush and Sneha's son (2023)
- Adhik Mehta as Adhik Mehta: Barkha's brother and foster son (2022–2024)
- Viidushi Tiwari / Akshita Vatsayan as Ishani "Ishu" Mehta: A model (2024–2025) / (2025–present)
  - Aadhya Barot as Child Ishaani (2024)
- Alka Kaushal as Vasundhara "Moti Baa" Kothari: Parag, Anil and Pankhuri's mother (2025–present)
- Rahil Azam as Parag Kothari: Vasundhara's son (2025–present)
- Zalak Desai as Khyati Patel Kothari: Parag's employee-turned-wife (2025–present)
- Randeep Rai as Aryan "Mohit / Akela" Kothari: Khyati and Parag's son; (2025)
- Mazher Sayed as Anil Kothari: Vasundhara's son; (2025–present)
- Shiwani Chakraborty as Meeta Kothari: Anil's wife; (2025–present)
- Jatin Suri as Raja Kothari: Anil and Meeta's elder son; (2025–present)
- Ishita Modi as Aarya "Pari" Shah Kothari: Kinjal and Paritosh's daughter (2024–present)
  - Princy Prajapati as Child Aarya (2024)
    - Noorain Khan as Baby Aarya (2022–2023)
- Arisht Jain as Badshah Kothari: Anil and Meeta's younger son (2025–present)
- Saee Barve as Gayatri Kothari: Parag's late wife (2025) (in flashbacks only)
- Satya Tiwari as Gautam Gandhi: Prarthana's ex-husband (2025–present)
- Spreha Chatterjee as Mahi Shah Gandhi: Kavya and Aniruddh's daughter (2024–present)
  - Pahal Chaudhary as Child Mahi (2024)
- Manish Goel as Raghav Singh: Pankhuri's estranged husband (2025)
- Neetu Bhatt as Pankhuri Kothari Singh: Vasundhara's daughter (2025) (only in flashbacks)
- Kanwarjit Paintal as Pandit Manohar Sharma: Raahi, Lily and Dance Ranis's dance teacher; (2025)
- Devarsh Nagar as Tarun Sharma: Manohar's estranged son (2025) (cameo appearance)
- Jay Zaveri as Viren Sanghvi: Rahi's foster father; (2024)
- Shivani Gosain as Megha Sanghvi: Rahi's foster mother; (2024)
- Rushad Rana as Aniruddh Gandhi: Kavya's ex-husband; (2020–2021; 2023)
- Shekhar Shukla as Jignesh "Mamaji": Leela's brother (2020–2022; 2025)
- Jaswir Kaur as Devika Mehta: Anupamaa's best friend (2020–2024; 2025–present)
- Payal Nair as Parul Sharma: Pakhi's principal (2020–2021)
- Bhakti Chauhan as Jhilmil: Gudiya's mother; (2020)
- Anagha Bhosale as Nandini "Nandu" Iyer: A dancer and former teacher of Anupamaa Dance Academy; (2020–2022)
- Tulika Patel as Kaamini (2020)
- Vivan Singh Rajput as Siddharth "Sid" Desai: Pakhi's classmate (2020)
- Riyaz Panjwani as Mr. Dholakia: Vanraj, Kavya, and Kinjal's former boss (2020; 2021)
- Arup Pal as CEO: New CEO of Vanraj's office (2020; 2021)
- Parull Chaudhary as Dr. Mona Chopra: Pakhi's psychiatrist (2021)
- Apurva Agnihotri as Dr. Advait "Adi" Khanna: Owner of Blissdom's Wellness Resort; (2021)
- Sunita Rai as Manasi Jain: Food critic at Vanraj's café (2021)
- Kiara Khantwal as Kiara: Video blogger at Vanraj's café (2021)
- Varun Sharma as Rohan: Nandini's former boyfriend and obsessive lover (2021)
- Deepak Gheewala as Gopichand "GK" Karodia: Anuj and Malvika's caretaker (2021–2022)
- Adhik Mehta as Adhik Mehta: Barkha's brother and foster son; (2022–2024)
- Rishabh Jaiswal as Nirmit: Dimple's ex-husband (2022)
- Nishi Saxena as Dimple aka Dimpy: Pammi's daughter; (2022–2024)
- Kunwar Amar as Tapish aka Titu: A dancer and former teacher at Anupamaa Dance Academy; (2023–2024)
- Nitesh Pandey as Dheeraj Kapoor: Anuj's best friend (2023)
- Amit Pachori as Mohit: Kavya's modeling photographer (2023)
- Chhavi Pandey as Uttara alias Maya: Priest's daughter; (2023)
- Renuka Sharma as Sushma: A former prostitute and Maya's friend (2023)
- Mahi Soni / Yashti Pamnani as Bhairavi: Student at Anupamaa Dance Academy (2023) / (2023)
- Apara Mehta as Malti "Gurumaa" Devi: Owner of Gurukul; (2023)
  - Khushali Jariwala as young Malti Devi (2023)
- Aman Maheshwari as Nakul: Malti's student and accomplice (2023)
- Lovish Saini as Shivansh "Sonu" Rathore: Suresh's son; (2023; 2025)
- Kumar Hegde as Suresh Rathore: A politician; (2023)
- Kaddy Trawally as Kaddy: Waitress at "Spice and Chutney" restaurant (2023–2024)
- Rituraj Singh as Yashpal Dhillon: Owner of "Spice and Chutney" restaurant; (2023–2024)
- Sunny Sadhwani as Vikram: Chef in "Spice and Chutney" restaurant; (2023–2024)
- Sukirti Kandpal as Shruti "Shru" Ahuja: A photographer; (2023–2024)
- Rahul Ojha as Rahul: Chef in "Kebabs & Curries" restaurant; (2023–2024)
- Dishi Duggal as Manjeet Kaur Dhillon: Yashpal and Yashdeep's mother (2024)
- Vaquar Shaikh as Yashdeep "Deepu" Dhillon: A retired army officer; (2024)
- Parakh Madan as Diya: A dancer; (2024)
- Aman Sachdev as Aarush: Pakhi's friend and business partner (2024)
- Yajuvendra Singh as Mr. Gulati: Owner of "Kebabs & Curries" restaurant; (2024)
- Akshita Tiwari as Nandita: Resident at Asha Bhavan; (2024)
- Parveen Kaur Hoogan as Indira: Resident at Asha Bhawan; (2024)
- Raaj Gopal Iyer as Bala: Resident at Asha Bhavan; (2024)
- Nitin Babu as Sagar: Resident at Asha Bhavan; (2024)
- Shahab Khan as Mr. Vyas: Owner of "Shishu Chhaya Ashram" (2024)
- Nidhi Pandya as Babli aka Bubbles: Raahi's best friend and helper from "Shishu Chhaya Ashram" (2024)
- Sejal Shah as Janki: Anupamaa's well-wisher and head chef in "Anu Ki Rasoi" (2024)
- Hera Mishra as Radha: Anupamaa's employee; (2024–2025)
- Gurpreet Kaur as Jaspreet "Jassi / Jass / Preeto" Kaur: Anupamaa and Bharti's roommate (2025–present)
- Arti Birajdar as Bharti Desai: Anupamaa and Jaspreet's roommate; (2025–present)
- Asha Dnyate as Sarita: Gajanan's wife; (2025–present)
- Reeta Prajapati as Reeta: Anupamaa, Jaspreet, Bharti and Sarita's neighbour (2025)
- Rinku Dhawan as Rajni Desai: Anupamaa's college friend; (2025–present)
- Mukul Harish as Varun Desai: Rajni's son; (2025–present)
- Bhawna Ajwani as Prerna Desai: Rajni's daughter; (2025–present)
- Sachin Tyagi as Digvijay Sood (2026-present)

== Production ==
=== Development ===
In February 2020, Rajan Shahi, the producer of Aai Kuthe Kay Karte, announced his plan to produce its Hindi remake, Anupamaa, stating, "This interesting concept around a mother's journey has been so inspirational that Star wants to bring it in Hindi too".

To celebrate Raksha Bandhan in 2020, the cast of the series created a special song titled Aaj Rakhi Nau Tyohaar Chhe (Today is Raksha Bandhan's festival). This unique song blended Gujarati, Hindi, and English languages.

The story took a five-year leap on 20 December 2023, with Anuj and Anupamaa's divorce and Anupamaa visiting the USA. On 15 July 2024, the show took another leap of six months showcasing Anupamaa and Anuj separately living miserable lives without Aadhya. On 14 October 2024, the show took a ten-year leap showcasing Anupamaa finding Aadhya/Raahi and Raahi's love story with Prem Kothari.

=== Casting ===
Casting of the series started in February 2020 with Rupali Ganguly being cast as the protagonist Anupamaa Shah, returning to television after seven years. She said, "When I joined Anupamaa, I was a little plump and I told our producer Rajan Shahi that you want a heroine and at this age, let me lose some weight. But the producer told me that he didn't want a heroine but a mother instead. ‘I want a mother and you are perfect for the role because mothers are like this."

Sudhanshu Pandey was cast as Anupamaa's husband Vanraj Shah, Paras Kalnawat, Muskan Bamne and Aashish Mehrotra as Anupamaa's children Samar Shah, Pakhi Shah and Paritosh Shah respectively, Alpana Buch and Arvind Vaidya being cast as Anupamaa's in-laws Leela Shah and Hasmukh Shah respectively. Later Madhavi Gogate and Mehul Nisar joined as Anupamaa's mother and brother, Kanta Joshi and Bhavesh Joshi, respectively, while Ekta Saraiya, Paresh Bhatt, Stuti Zakarde and Bhakti Chauhan were cast to play Dolly Shah Dhamecha, Sanjay Dhamecha, Meenakshi Dhamecha and Jhilmil respectively. However, days before the filming resumed after the COVID-19 outbreak in late June, Additi Gupta was confirmed to be infected with the virus. She was replaced by Madalsa Sharma and the sequences earlier shot by Gupta as Vanraj's girlfriend Kavya Gandhi, were reshot by Sharma.

Days after premiering in July 2020, Shekhar Shukla was cast to play Leela's brother Jignesh while Nidhi Shah was cast opposite Mehrotra as Kinjal Dave and Tassnim Sheikh and Farooq Saeed were signed to play Kinjal's parents Rakhi Dave and Pramod Dave respectively. The next month Anagha Bhosale was cast opposite Kalnawat as Nandini Iyer while Rushad Rana was cast as Kavya's husband Aniruddh Gandhi. In April 2021, Apurva Agnihotri joined the cast as Dr. Advait Khanna for a cameo and completed his role in June 2021.

In June 2021, rumours of "conflicts and groupism on sets" arose between cast members, one group led by Ganguly with Buch, Mehrotra and Bamne, and another by Pandey, with Sharma, Kalnawat and Bhosale which cast denied.

In late August 2021 Gaurav Khanna was cast opposite Ganguly as Anuj Kapadia.

In September 2021, Deepak Gheewala was cast to play Anuj's helper Gopichandra Karodia. Also that month, Varun Sharma was cast to play a cameo as Nandini's ex-boyfriend and obsessive lover Rohan and he finished off his role in October 2021. Next, Savita Prabhune replaced Madhavi Gogate (due to the latter's death) as Kanta Joshi in late October 2021. In December 2021, actress Aneri Vajani joined the cast to play Anuj's sister, Malvika Kapadia.

In January 2022, there were rumours of "ego clashes" between Pandey and Khanna, which they both publicly denied.

In March 2022, Anagha Bhosale playing Nandini announced her decision to take a break from acting, and later quit acting forever, ending Nandini's character and shot her last scene in February 2022. Later that month, Aneri Vajani playing Malvika also announced that her role was just a cameo and right now its shown on a long break due to viewers' disconnect with her role's negative development.

In May 2022, singer Mika Singh made a special appearance as Anuj's friend in Anupamaa and Anuj's Mehendi and Sangeet ceremony and to promote his upcoming show Swayamvar – Mika Di Vohti. During that month, Aneri Vajani announced her decision to participate in Fear Factor: Khatron Ke Khiladi 12 and quit the series permanently.

Later that month, Rohit Bakshi and Ashlesha Sawant were cast to play Anuj's brother and sister-in-law, Ankush Kapadia and Barkha Mehta Kapadia respectively while Alma Hussein and Adhik Mehta were cast to play Barkha's daughter and brother, Sara Kapadia and Adhik Mehta opposite Kalnawat and Bamne respectively. In an interview after being cast as Adhik Mehta, Mehta revealed that "he earlier auditioned for the role of Samar (which eventually locked to Kalnawat) in the casting phase of the series but it didn't happened at that time". Child artist Asmi Deo was also cast as an orphan Anu but her track was put on hold and resumed in July 2022 as Anuj and Anupamaa's adopted daughter.

In July 2022, Paras Kalnawat signed on to appear on the dance-based reality show Jhalak Dikhhla Jaa 10 on rival network Colors TV. Anupamaa makers objected and terminated his contract overnight on 26 July 2022. Kalnawat revealed that "after Bhosale's exit his character never evolved, and that he was unhappy with his role being reduced to a mere family member standing in background with nothing to do anything." Later after facing several controversies related to the series, makers replaced Kalnawat overnight by Sagar Parekh in the same month.

In September 2022, Alma Hussein who was cast opposite Kalnawat also quit the series, saying she was unhappy with the lack of character development and shot her last scene in early August 2022.

In January 2023, actress Chhavi Pandey was cast to do an extended cameo of Anu's biological mother, Maya, who wrapped up in July 2023 following her character's death. In May 2023, Apara Mehta was cast as Anuj's mother Malti Devi, while her daughter Khushali Jariwala played her younger version on screen and she quit the series prior to the first leap in December 2023.

In August 2023, Ekta Saraiya, who portrayed Vanraj's sister Dolly, quit the series for her show Kyunki... Saas Maa Bahu Beti Hoti Hai on Zee TV. In same month, Viraj Kapoor entered the show as Ankush's illegitimate son Romil Kapadia.

In October 2023, Sagar Parekh, who replaced Paras Kalnawat in the role of Samar in July 2022, was confirmed exiting the show with storyline showcasing Samar's death due to decreasing TRP ratings of the show. In the following month actor and dancer Kunwar Amar joined the cast as Tapish opposite Nishi Saxena.

In December 2023, the show took its first leap of five years. Post-leap, child actress Asmi Deo was replaced by Aurra Bhatnagar Badoni to play the adolescent version of Aadhya Kapadia while Savita Prabhune's character Kanta was shown dead thus marking an end to her character. Child actor Trishaan Shah was cast to play Samar and Dimple's son Ansh Shah. The same month Muskan Bamne portraying Pakhi quit the series after three years as "she doesn't wish to play mother at such a young age and wants to move ahead in her career" and was later replaced by Chandni Bhagwanani while child actor Aadhya Barot was cast as her daughter Ishani Mehta the same month. Sukirti Kandpal too entered the show as Anuj's fiancée Shruti Ahuja the same month. Following this Rituraj Singh and Dishi Duggal too entered the show as Yashpal and his mother.

In April 2024, Aashish Mehrotra, who portrayed Paritosh, quit the series the following month after playing it for four years to participate in Fear Factor: Khatron Ke Khiladi 14 and was replaced by Gaurav Sharma the same month. In July 2024, Sukirti Kandpal aka Shruti's track ended marking her exit. In same month show took its second leap, a small leap of six months and Nitin Babu and Akshita Tiwari entered the show as Sagar and Nandita respectively while Sonal Khilwani entered the show as the adult Meenakshi Dhamecha thus replacing Stuti Zakarde.

On 28 August 2024, Sudhanshu Pandey announced his decision to quit the series after playing it for four years via his Instagram handle and said "his last appearance was in Raksha Bandhan special episodes and he will continue entertaining his audience through new roles."

In 2024 after Sudhanshu Pandey quit the show, Ekta Saraiya Mehta, who played Dolly Shah Dhamecha from 2020 to 2023, rejoined and reprised her role the following month while Madalsa Sharma playing Kavya also quit the series as she felt she was "sidelined after removal of grey element from her character". Later she said that Rupali Ganguly was "two-faced" thus confirming the earlier reported split amongst cast members in 2021.

The show took its first generation leap on 14 October 2024 with Aurra Bhatnagar Badoni being replaced by Alisha Parveen as grown-up Aadhya playing the new female lead whilst Shivam Khajuria was cast opposite her as Prem Kothari, the new male lead. Prior to leap Nishi Saxena portraying Dimple too exited the series as the storyline showcased her character's death while Kunwar Amar playing Tapish too announced his exit. Gaurav Sharma was also replaced by Manish Naggdev as older Paritosh due to Sharma's refusal to play and be typecast "as a father of 21-year-old Aarya". Additionally, Nidhi Shah, who has portrayed Kinjal since the show's inception, announced her exit before the leap as she "wants to focus more on other platforms and lead roles" and was replaced by Milloni Kapadia as older Kinjal. Chandni Bhagwanani too announced her exit from the show prior to the leap as she too "didn't wanted to play mother to a 22-years-old Ishani" and was replaced by Krutika Desai as older Pakhi. Child actors Trishaan Shah, Princy Prajapati, Aadhya Barot and Pahal Chaudhary were replaced by Varun Kasturia, Ishita Modi, Viidushi Tiwari and Spreha Chatterjee as grown-up Ansh, Aarya, Ishani and Mahi, respectively.

In December 2024, Gaurav Khanna portraying Anuj Kapadia confirmed his exit quoting "He felt it was best time for him to move on and expose himself to new opportunities" while the storyline had already showcased Anuj dead. On 20 December 2024, leading actress Alisha Parveen Khan was terminated overnight without any prior warning. Regarding her termination Khan said, "It is shocking and disappointing. I am not sure what exactly happened and why I am being replaced! Today was my last day on the set of Anupamaa." Within few hours she was replaced by Adrija Roy.

In early January 2025, Zalak Desai and Rahil Azam stepped in to play Prem's parents Khyati Kothari and Parag Kothari while Alka Kaushal stepped in as his grandmother thus bringing the track of a new Kothari family to the series while Sheersha Tiwari already started portraying his sister Prarthana Kothari in December 2024. while Mazher Sayed who earlier worked with the production house in 2015 in another show Yeh Rishta Kya Kehlata Hai and Shiwani Chakraborty joined in as Prem's uncle and aunt.

In March 2025, actors Randeep Rai and Manish Goel joined as Prem's half-brother, Aryan Kothari and Raghav Singh respectively. However, Rai quit in June 2025, following the death of his character while Manish Goel playing Raghav also quit. In the same month, the show took a leap of eight months, and Aarti Birajdar and Gurpreet Kaur entered as Bharti and Jaspreet respectively. while veteran actor Kanwarjit Paintal entered as Pandit Manohar.

In October 2025, Sagar Parekh, who quit in 2023 owing the death of his character Samar, returned for a special segment as Samar's spirit. In the same month, Vidushi Tiwari playing Ishani, quit owning health issues and she is replaced by Akshita Vatsayan.

=== Filming ===
Set in Gujarat, the series is mainly shot at Film City in Mumbai. Some initial sequences were shot in Ahmedabad during early March 2020.

On 13 February 2021, the filming was halted for a day for sanitisation when Paras Kalnawat playing Samar, tested positive for COVID-19 virus. The sequences of Kalnawat with Anagha Bhosale playing Nandini were cancelled including proposal sequence of their characters and were replanned until his recovery and return in late February 2021. However he shot some sequences from his home under his and his mother's quarantine period.

On 2 April 2021, Rupali Ganguly, Sudhanshu Pandey and Aashish Mehrotra who portray Anupamaa, Vanraj and Paritosh respectively and producer Rajan Shahi tested positive for COVID-19. Certain sequences were postponed and the story focused more on the characters Rakhi, Kavya and Leela while Ganguly, Pandey and Mehrotra shot for few sequences from their homes. A few days later, Tassnim Sheikh, Alpana Buch and Nidhi Shah also tested positive for COVID-19 and the story focussed more on Samar, Nandini and Pakhi's characters.

On 13 April 2021, the Chief Minister of Maharashtra, Uddhav Thackeray announced a sudden curfew due to increased Covid cases in Maharashtra, while the production halted from 14 April 2021. Hence, the production location was soon shifted temporarily to Silvassa alongside other shows of the production house. In June 2021, the Maharashtra government permitted shooting within the state with certain restrictions, following which the whole cast and crew returned to Mumbai on 8 June 2021 and resumed shooting the following day.

=== Controversy ===
On 14 November 2024, a 32-year-old, Vineet Kumar Mandal, who worked as a camera attendant was fatally electrocuted whilst filming. Following which AICWA lodged a case against the production house for negligence in safety measures of crew members on sets and trying to suppress the matter by being backed by the channel.

=== Release ===
Initially scheduled to premiere on 16 March 2020, it was postponed due to the coronavirus scare. Anupamaa finally premiered on 13 July 2020 on Star Plus, replacing Yeh Rishtey Hain Pyaar Ke. Since 2 October 2022, it is broadcast daily along with other Star Plus's shows.

== Prequel series ==
An eleven-episode prequel web series, Anupama: Namaste America, was released on Disney+ Hotstar on 25 April 2022. The story is set ten years after Anupamaa and Vanraj's marriage in the year 2005.

== Special episodes ==
=== Ravivaar With Star Parivaar (2022) ===
The cast of Anupamaa participated as a team in the musical game show Ravivaar With Star Parivaar. It competed with the teams of other Star Plus's shows. Anupamaa emerged as the 2nd runner-up of the show.

=== Crossovers ===
Anupamaa had three crossover with Yeh Rishta Kya Kehlata Hai. The first was from 26 March 2022 to 28 March 2022, the second from 21 December 2023 to 22 December 2023 and the third was on 19 August 2024.

On 3 December 2023, Anupamaa had a crossover with Baatein Kuch Ankahee Si.

== Reception ==
=== Critics ===
India Today stated, "Rupali Ganguly fits the character perfectly and aces the role of a Gujarati homemaker. The show strikes a chord with the homemakers as they can identify with the protagonist. Anupamaa has the right amount of emotions, drama, and spice. The show has the right mix of family values and a modern outlook. The show is a heartwarming tale".

ThePrint appreciated the series, along with few other Hindi GECs based on the story of a mother, mentioning that it delivered moral lessons and calling the character Anupamaa a paragon of virtue and farcical.

On its popularity, Yashika Singla of The Print noted, "It has become a feminist movement in itself. From young women commuting in the Metro to mothers and grandmothers at home, everyone is watching it."

Shephali Bhatt of The Mint stated, "At a time when the plot points of Indian TV shows get more outlandish every day — Anupama seems to be rewriting the Indian television playbook".

=== In popular culture ===
Anupamaa's (Rupali Ganguly) "aapko kya" dialogue went viral on social media and was the subject of various memes and recreations.

In October 2024, after the fifteen-year generation leap in the story, netizens spotted similarities between the Aadhya-Anupamaa reunion track and reunion track of "Akshara-Naira"(2016) from Yeh Rishta Kya Kehlata Hai, another popular soap of the same production house. The Times of India stated, "Now, fans have taken to their Instagram handles to find the exact same scene from the show Yeh Rishta Kya Kehlata Hai when "Akshara" (Hina Khan) reunited with "Naira" (Shivangi Joshi) after a leap. As the fanpage posted both promos, many of them have commented, a user wrote, "Kitna vi kar le Akshara or naira jaisa nhi ho sakta" (They can never match Akshara and Naira)."

== Adaptations ==
Star Plus's Anupamaa is an official Hindi remake of Star Jalsha's Sreemoyee. Sreemoyee's Marathi remake, Aai Kuthe Kay Karte, and Anupamaa both are produced by same producer Rajan Shahi under Director's Kut Productions and follow the same plot.

== Awards and nominations ==
Year	Award	Category	Nominee	Result	Ref.
2020	Gold Awards	Dynamic Actor	Sudhanshu Pandey	Won	
2021	20th Indian Television Academy Awards	Best Actor Popular	Sudhanshu Pandey	Won	
2021	20th Indian Television Academy Awards	Best Actress Popular	Rupali Ganguly	Nominated	
2021	20th Indian Television Academy Awards	Best Actress in Supporting Role	Madalsa Sharma Chakraborty	Nominated	
2021	20th Indian Television Academy Awards	Best Show Popular	Anupamaa	Nominated	
2022	21st Indian Television Academy Awards	Best Actress Popular	Rupali Ganguly	Won	
2022	21st Indian Television Academy Awards	Best Actress Jury	Rupali Ganguly	Nominated	
2022	21st Indian Television Academy Awards	Best Actor Popular	Sudhanshu Pandey	Nominated	
2022	21st Indian Television Academy Awards	Best Actor Jury	Sudhanshu Pandey	Won	
2022	21st Indian Television Academy Awards	Best Show Popular	Anupamaa	Won	
2022	21st Indian Television Academy Awards	Best Actress Comedy	Alpana Buch	Nominated	
2022	21st Indian Television Academy Awards	Best Actor Comedy	Shekhar Shukla	Nominated	
2022	22nd Indian Television Academy Awards	Best Actress Popular- Drama	Rupali Ganguly	Nominated	
2022	22nd Indian Television Academy Awards	Best Actor Popular- Drama	Gaurav Khanna	Nominated	
2022	22nd Indian Television Academy Awards	Best Actor Popular- Drama	Sudhanshu Pandey	Nominated	
2022	22nd Indian Television Academy Awards	Best Show Popular- Drama	Anupamaa	Nominated	
2022	22nd Indian Television Academy Awards	Best Actor in a Supporting Role- Drama	Arvind Vaidya	Won	
2023	Gold Awards	Best Actor in a Leading Role	Gaurav Khanna	Nominated	
2023	Gold Awards	Best Actor in a Leading Role	Sudhanshu Pandey	Nominated	
2023	Gold Awards	Best Actress in a Leading Role	Rupali Ganguly	Nominated	
2023	Gold Awards	Best Actor in a Supporting Role	Paras Kalnawat	Nominated	
2023	Gold Awards	Best Actress in a Supporting Role	Nidhi Shah	Nominated	
2023	Gold Awards	Best Actress in a Negative Role	Madalsa Sharma Chakraborty	Nominated	
2023	Gold Awards	Best Actor in a Comic Role	Shekhar Shukla	Nominated	
2023	Gold Awards	Best Director	Romesh Kalra	Nominated	
2023	Gold Awards	Best Fiction Show of the Year	Anupamaa	Nominated	
2023	Gold Awards	Gold Best Onscreen Jodi	Gaurav Khanna and Rupali Ganguly	Nominated	
2023	Indian Telly Awards	Best Actor in a Lead Role	Gaurav Khanna	Nominated	
2023	Indian Telly Awards	Best Actor in a Lead Role	Sudhanshu Pandey	Nominated	
2023	Indian Telly Awards	Most Outstanding Performance	Sudhanshu Pandey	Won	
2023	Indian Telly Awards	Actor in a Lead Role (Jury)	Gaurav Khanna	Won	
2023	Indian Telly Awards	Best Actress in a Lead Role	Rupali Ganguly	Won	
2023	Indian Telly Awards	Best Actress in a Supporting Role	Alpana Buch	Won	
2023	Indian Telly Awards	Best Actor in a Supporting Role	Aashish Mehrotra	Nominated	
2023	Indian Telly Awards	Best Child Artiste - Female	Asmi Deo	Won	
2023	Indian Telly Awards	Best Director	Romesh Kalra	Nominated	
2023	Indian Telly Awards	Best Drama Series	Anupamaa	Won	
2023	Indian Telly Awards	Best Onscreen Couple	Gaurav Khanna and Rupali Ganguly	Won	
2023	Indian Telly Awards	Best Screenplay Writer	Bhavna Vyas	Won	
2023	Indian Telly Awards	Best Choreographer	Himanshu Gadani	Won	
2023	Indian Telly Awards	Best Background Music	Sargam Jassu and Nakash Aziz	Won	
