= Sudhanshu Pandey =

Indian television actor (born 1974)

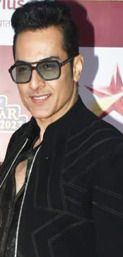
- Pandey in 2023
- Born: India
- Occupations: Model; actor; singer; writer; producer; Part time poet
- Years active: 1994–present
- Spouse: Mona Pandey (m. 1996)
- Children: 2

Sudhanshu Pandey is an Indian model, film and television actor, singer, writer producer and part time poet. He has appeared in many Hindi films and few Tamil films.

== Career ==
After a successful modelling career, he made his television debut with Beta, which aired in 1999. That same year, Pandey featured in the song, Maikhane se Sharab se from Pankaj Udhas 's Album Mahek. Pandey's first film was supposed to be "Khajuraho 950 AD" in 2000 alongside Divya dutta, Kulbhushan kharbanda and Anupam kher but later the film got shelved later he made his film debut in Khiladi 420 as co-lead with Akshay Kumar. He then became part of India's first ever boy band A Band of Boys. In 2002, his first album Yeh Bhi Woh Bhi was released. Pandey left A Band of Boys in 2005, as he needed to settle down financially, but rejoined in 2024.

Pandey also regularly appeared in Tamil cinema throughout the 2010s, and portrayed his first main antagonist role in Billa II (2012) starring Ajith Kumar. He later followed that up with roles in Meaghamann (2014), Indrajith (2017) and 2.0 (2018), the most expensive Indian film at the time of its release.

In 2020, he began portraying Vanraj Shah in Anupamaa, which popularized him among the Hindi-speaking audience. However, he quit the series in August 2024, after four years.

In 2022, he reprised his role of Vanraj Shah in Anupamaa's eleven-episode prequel web series Anupama: Namaste America.

His second solo single Dil Ki Tu Zameen was launched in 2023 in which he performed alongside Madalsa Sharma. He produced the song. In June 2025, he participated as contestant in The Traitors India, where he finished at 4th place.

== Personal life ==
His mother is a Punjabi and in an interview, he identified himself as 'half-Punjabi'.

Pandey is married to Mona Pandey and they have two sons, Nirvaan and Vivaan Pandey.

== Filmography ==
=== Films ===
Year	Title	Role	Notes
2000	Khiladi 420	Rahul	
2004	Kiss Kis Ko	Sudhanshu Mathur	Also singer
2005	Pehchaan: The Face of Truth	Milind D. Khanna	
2005	The Myth	Dasar temple guard captain	
2005	Yakeen	Kabir	
2006	Manoranjan :The Entertainment	Vicky	
2006	Unns	Rishi Rampal	
2006	Jadu Sa Chal Gaya	Raj	
2006	Katputti	Bar Tender	
2007	Dus Kahaniyaan	Aditya Singh	Anthology film; Segment: "Matrimony"
2007	Humrahi		
2008	Singh Is Kinng	Raftaar	
2008	Dhara	Sagar	
2008	Saas Bahu Aur Sensex	Yash Modi	
2010	Sky Ki Umeed	Rajendar & Vir	Dual roles
2011	Singham	Rakesh Kadam	Cameo
2011	EK Noor	Renjith	Punjabi film
2011	Murder 2	Inspector Sadaa	
2011	Tell Me O Kkhuda	Kunwar Virat Pratap	
2012	Bekhabar		
2012	Billa II	Abbasi	Tamil film Nominated—SIIMA Award for Best Actor in a Negative Role
2013	Rajdhani Express	Muneesh	
2014	Meaghamann	Rane	Tamil film
2015	Chooriyan	Aman Brar	Punjabi film
2017	Indrajith	Kapil Sharma	Tamil film
2017	Jia Aur Jia	Arvind Jaisingh	
2018	2.0	Dhinendra Bohra	Tamil film
2018	The Bar	Kabir	Short film
2019	Bypass Road	Narang Kapoor	
2019	Manmadhudu 2	Amith	Telugu film
2019	Seasoned With Love	Arjun	Short film
2021	Radhe	Dilawar	Cameo Appearance
2021	Pon Manickavel	Badrinath	Tamil film
2021	Fitrat	Nasir	Short film

=== Music videos ===
Year	Song	Album	Singer	Notes
1999	Maikhane se Sharab se	Mahek	Pankaj Udhas	
2002	"Ishq Hai Bekarar"	Yeh Bhi Woh Bhi	Himself along with other A Band of Boys members	
2008	Mujhko Rana Ji Maaf Karna			
2018	Teri Adaa		Himself	
2023	Dil Ki Tu Zameen		Himself	
2024	Maa		Ankit Tiwari	

=== Television ===
Year	TV Shows/Serial	Role	Notes
1997	Mano Ya Na Mano	Unnamed	Episodic Character
1999	Suspense Hour	Vikram	Cameo appearance
1999	Kanyadaan	Karan	
1999	Beta	Akash	
2000-2001	Rishtey	Various	
2001-2005	Dishayen	Samir (Baba)	
2002	Sanjivani	Vishal Kapoor	
2002	Cook It Up With Tarla Dalal	Host	
2002	Kismey Kitnaa Hai Dam	Himself	
2003	Kuch Kehti Hai Yeh Dhun	Himself	Guest performer as a part of A Band of Boys; Indian musical game reality show Hosted by actress and singer Raageshwari.
2003	Hai Na Bolo Bolo	Himself	
2004	Yeh Meri Life Hai	Professor Vikram Roy	
2006	Akela	Ranvir	
2006	Man Mein Hai Visshwas	Wing commander Shashikant Oak	Cameo appearance
2009	Monica Mogre - Case Files	Hritivik	
2011	Jhansi Ki Rani	Yuvraj	
2012–2013	Ek Veer Ki Ardaas...Veera	Sampooran Singh	
2015	Siyaasat	Jahangir aka Salim	
2015–2016	Chakravartin Ashoka Samrat	Keechak	
2016	Tamanna	Diwakar Limaye	
2016	24 (Season 2)	Vedant Acharya	
2016	Bharatvarsh	Shivaji	
2020–2024	Anupamaa	Vanraj "V" Shah	
2022	Ravivaar With Star Parivaar	Vanraj "V" Shah	Episodes 1, 2, 4, 5, 7, 8, 9, 15 & 16
2025	Wagle Ki Duniya – Nayi Peedhi Naye Kissey	Rakesh Diwan (Rocky D)	Cameo
2026	Mahadev & Sons	Baldev Singh Chauhan	Cameo
2026	Laughter Chefs - Unlimited Entertainment season 3		Cameo, for the promotion of Do Duniya Ek Dil
2026	Do Duniya Ek Dil	Baldev Singh Chauhan	

=== Web series ===
Year	Title	Role	Notes
2019	Jamai 2.O	Cheeram	
2019	Dance Bar	Dhanraj Shekhawat	Ullu Series
2020	Hundred	Pravin Shukla	
2020	The Casino	Shailendra Singh Marwah	
2022	Anupama: Namaste America	Vanraj "Guthlu" Shah	
2023	A Day Turns Daark	Radhe Shayam Hooda	
2025	The Traitors India	Contestant	4th place

=== Vertical Drama ===
Year	Title	Role	Notes
2025	Engineer Vs Billionaire	Ranvijay	Kuku TV originals

== Discography ==
=== Albums ===
Year	Album	Notes
2002	Yeh Bhi Woh Bhi	Band Of Boys
2004	Kis Kis Ko	Band of boys
2024	A Band of Boys: Reignite	Band Of Boys
2026	Groove With God	Rudra Rhythm; Ram Ram

=== Film music ===
Year	Album	Track	Notes
2007	Dus Kahaniyaan	Aaja Soniye	

=== Singles ===
Year	Track	Artist	Producer	Lyricist	Reference
2018	Teri Adaa	Sudhanshu Pandey, Myra Sareen	Sudhanshu Pandey	Sudhanshu Pandey, Ravi Singhal	
2023	Dil Ki Tu Zameen	Sudhanshu Pandey, Madalsa Sharma Chakraborty	Sudhanshu Pandey	Himanshu Kholi	
2024	Behisaba			Kumaar	

== Awards and nominations ==
Year	Award	Category	Work	Result	Ref.
2012	South Indian International Movie Awards	Best Actor In A Negative Role	Billa II	Nominated	
2020	Gold Awards	Dynamic Actor	Anupamaa	Won	
2021	20th Indian Television Academy Awards	Best Actor Popular	Anupamaa	Won	
2022	21st Indian Television Academy Awards	Best Actor Jury	Anupamaa	Won	
2022	22nd Indian Television Academy Awards	Best Actor Popular- Drama	Anupamaa	Nominated	
2023	Indian Telly Awards	Most Outstanding Performance	Anupamaa	Won	
