= Nidhi Shah =

Indian television actress

- Born: Mumbai, Maharashtra, India
- Citizenship: Indian
- Occupation: Actress
- Years active: 2011–present
- Known for: Anupamaa

Nidhi Shah is a talented, versatile and charismatic Indian actress known for her work across television, films and the entertainment industry. With her captivating screen presence, distinctive style and engaging personality, she has carved a niche for herself in the world of entertainment. Beyond acting, she is recognised for her association with fashion, lifestyle and leading brands, making her a prominent face in the entertainment and digital space.

== Career ==
Shah made her acting debut as a child artist in the 2011 web series That's So Awesome. She then played small cameos in the 2013 Hindi films Mere Dad Ki Maruti and Phata Poster Nikhla Hero respectively.

She made her television debut in 2016 with Jaana Na Dil Se Door portraying Shweta Kashyap.

From 2017 to 2018, she portrayed Poorva Sharma Shetty opposite Kiran Raj in Tu Aashiqui. In 2019, she portrayed Suman Patwardhan in Kavach ... Mahashivrati.

She portrayed Shanaya Arora in Kartik Purnima opposite Chirag Mahbubani in 2020. She also portrayed Vidhi in the web series Dating Siyapaa the same year.

Since July 2020, She portraying Kinjal Dave Shah opposite Ashish Mehrotra and later on opposite Gaurav Sharma in Anupamaa, it proved as a major turning point in her career. In November 2023, she revealed in an interview that she had made an exit from the show's current track and later rejoined the show in December 2023. However she permanently quitted the show in October 2024 owing to a generation leap and got replaced by Milloni Kapadia.

== Filmography ==
=== Films ===
| Year | Title | Role | Notes | Ref. |
|---|---|---|---|---|
| 2013 | Mere Dad Ki Maruti | Unknown | Cameo appearance | |
| 2013 | Phata Poster Nikhla Hero | Unknown | Cameo appearance | |

=== Television ===
| Year | Title | Role | Notes | Ref. |
|---|---|---|---|---|
| 2016 | Jaana Na Dil Se Door | Shweta "Guddi" Kashyap | | |
| 2017–2018 | Tu Aashiqui | Poorva Sharma Shetty | | |
| 2019 | Kavach ... Mahashivrati | Suman Patwardhan | | |
| 2020 | Kartik Purnima | Shanaya "Shanu" Arora | | |
| 2020–2024 | Anupamaa | Kinjal "Kinju" Dave Shah | | |
| 2022 | Ravivaar With Star Parivaar | Kinjal "Kinju" Dave Shah | Episode 11/15/16 | |

=== Web series ===
| Year | Title | Role |
|---|---|---|
| 2011 | That's So Awesome | Child artist |
| 2020 | Dating Siyapaa | Vidhi |
| 2026 | Sapne vs Everyone season 2 | Vedha |

=== Music videos ===
| Year | Title | Singer | Ref. |
|---|---|---|---|
| 2021 | Hope You Don't Mind | Qaran | |
| 2023 | Kuch Toh Zaroor Hai | Javed Ali | |

== Awards and nominations ==
| Year | Award | Category | Work | Result | Ref. |
|---|---|---|---|---|---|
| 2022 | Gold Awards | Best Actress in a Supporting Role | Anupamaa | Nominated | |

== See also ==
- List of Hindi television actresses
