= Director's Kut Productions =

Indian production company

- Industry: Entertainment
- Founded: 2007
- Founder: Rajan Shahi
- Headquarters: Mumbai, India
- Key people: Rajan Shahi
- Products: Television series Web series
- Website: directorskutproduction.com

Director's Kut Productions is an Indian television production company based in Mumbai, which is owned by Rajan Shahi. Established in 2007, it produces television shows and web-series for various channels. Some of its notable works include: Sapna Babul Ka... Bidaai, Yeh Rishta Kya Kehlata Hai, Yeh Rishtey Hain Pyaar Ke, Aai Kuthe Kay Karte! and Anupamaa.

== History ==
Rajan Shahi did his schooling from St Columbus, and got graduated from Hindu College, Delhi, and came to Mumbai.

In 1993, Shahi started his career as an assistant director. In 1999, Shahi made his directorial debut with the series Dil Hai Ki Manta Nahi. He then went on to direct series like Jassi Jaissi Koi Nahin, Hamare Tumhare, Rishtey, Kareena Kareena, Reth, Mamtaa, Millee, Virasaat and Saathi Re. Thereafter he worked as a series director for Saat Phere: Saloni Ka Safar, Ghar Ki Laxmi Betiyaan and Maayaka.

Eventually, he became a television producer and started his own production company in 2007. His first series as producer was Sapna Babul Ka...Bidaai on Star Plus, followed by Shital Tai, Yeh Rishta Kya Kehlata Hai, Chand Chupa Badal Mein and Tere Sheher Mein on Star Plus.

In 2019, they started producing Yeh Rishtey Hain Pyaar Ke which is a spin-off of Yeh Rishta Kya Kehlata Hai on the latter show's success. In 2019, the production house entered in Marathi GEC space and produce Marathi serial Aai Kuthe Kay Karte! for Star Network's Marathi channel Star Pravah. The Serial was later remade in Hindi as Anupamaa on Star Plus which premiered on 13 July 2020.

They also made a short film named Yolk for International film festival. They have a YouTube channel named Directors Kut Productions, which is run by Rajan Shahi's daughter, Ishika Shahi.

== Current productions ==
=== Television series ===
Series	Channel	Premiere date
Yeh Rishta Kya Kehlata Hai	Star Plus	12 January 2009
Anupamaa	Star Plus	13 July 2020

== Former productions ==
Series	Channel	Airing Period
Sapna Babul Ka...Bidaai	Star Plus	8 October 2007 – 13 November 2010
Maat Pitaah Ke Charnon Mein Swarg	Colors TV	29 June 2009 – 4 June 2010
Chand Chupa Badal Mein	Star Plus	28 June 2010 – 17 June 2011
Havan	Colors TV	26 September 2011 – 30 March 2012
Kuch Toh Log Kahenge	Sony TV	3 October 2011 – 28 March 2013
Amrit Manthan	Life OK	26 February 2012 – 2 August 2013
Jamuna Paar	Imagine TV	27 February 2012 – 12 April 2012
Aur Pyaar Ho Gaya	Zee TV	6 January 2014 – 2 December 2014
Itti Si Khushi	Sony TV	29 September 2014 – 2 January 2015
Tere Sheher Mein	Star Plus	2 March 2015 – 14 November 2015
Baavle Utaavle	SAB TV	18 February 2019 – 26 August 2019
Yeh Rishtey Hain Pyaar Ke	Star Plus	18 March 2019 – 17 October 2020
Aai Kuthe Kay Karte!	Star Pravah	23 December 2019 – 30 November 2024
Mann Kee Awaaz Pratigya 2	Star Bharat	15 March 2021 – 25 August 2021
Woh Toh Hai Albelaa	Star Bharat	14 March 2022 – 14 June 2023
Baatein Kuch Ankahee Si	Star Plus	21 August 2023 – 11 March 2024

=== Web series ===
Series	Platform	Premiere date	Notes
Anupama: Namaste America	Disney+ Hotstar	25 April 2022	Prequel web series to Anupamaa
Jabb Zodiacs Met	YouTube	16 January 2026	
Heer Sharma Gayi	YouTube	April 2026	
Tu Yaa Koi Nahi	YouTube	June 2026	

== Controversies ==
- When Karan Mehra who portrayed "Naitik Singhania" and Hina Khan who portrayed "Akshara Maheshwari Singhania" quit Yeh Rishta Kya Kehlata Hai who in June 2016 and November 2016 respectively then producer Rajan Shahi exclaimed that, "With due respect to both the actors, it is a fact that after Naitik (Karan's character) left, we could consolidate our position much stronger and the TRPs actually increased. Likewise, after Hina's exit, the show has grown." This badly hurt Hina and Karan and the production house landed into a controversy. In response to the interview, a hurt Hina Khan, "I don't want to get into this blame game. Well, he can say whatever he wishes to." She further added, "why was he quiet when we were part of the show for eight long years? During that time, he went on record to praise both of us for our dedication and professionalism. And honestly, we were probably the only lead pair on television who continued to be with the show for eight consecutive years. Despite the work pressure, disagreements and other work opportunities, we continued to stay loyal to the show and supported the producer." While Karan said, "Everyone on the set and the channel knows my work and attendance records. If he is saying that I worked for two-three hours, he is referring to someone else because my attendance register is the proof. Also, I gave my notice period in advance. I don't know who he has a grudge against and why is he saying it now? I was thanked by the channel and Rajan sir when I quit, so I don't understand how this has emerged now. Honestly, I am happy in my space and looking forward to new beginnings. I am not in touch with him anymore and I can't keep commenting on other people's grievances. All I can say is, 'To each his own'."
- The production company and producer Rajan Shahi again faced a controversy in July 2022 with actor Paras Kalnawat who portrayed "Samar Shah" in Anupamaa when the latter decided to participate in rival channel's dance-based reality show Jhalak Dikhhla Jaa 10 and he terminated Kalnawat's contract quoting "We as a production house won't entertain breach of contract. We have terminated his (Kalnawat's) services as an actor with immediate effect. We wish him all the best for his future endeavours". While Paras said, "Everything is great with Anupamaa but I did not see my character evolving. I have huge respect for Rajan sir and the team and wish them all the best. At this stage of my career, I wanted to take up a new challenge. Also, I must add that I did inform the production about my decision, however, due to the channel and contract clauses, it wouldn't have been possible for me to continue with Anupamaa after signing Jhalak". He further said, "My character never evolved since past one year and after Anagha's (the actress who portrayed "Nandini Iyer," Samar's ex-fiancée in the series) exit I was just reduced to a family member standing in background with nothing to do" and he signed off calling whatever happened was a "nightmare" and "sigh of relief" as makers asked him to choose between the two revealing many dark secrets of the production house including his return to show within five days of his father's demise as leads were tested COVID-19 positive.
- The production house and Rajan Shahi came into bad light in March 2024 when Rajan Shahi terminated two actors Shehzada Dhami and Pratiksha Honmukhe, portraying the fourth generation male lead and parallel lead "Armaan Poddar" and "Ruhi Birla Poddar" respectively in Yeh Rishta Kya Kehlata Hai, citing "unprofessional behavior" and replaced them with Rohit Purohit and Garvita Sadhwani respectively overnight and the termination and replacements getting backed by few cast members.
- On 14 November 2024, a 32-years-old crew member, Vineet Kumar Mandal who worked as a camera attendant in Anupamaa died of electrocution whilst filming. Following which AICWA lodged a case against the production house for negligence in safety measures of crew members on sets and trying to suppress the matter by being backed by the channel.
- On 20 December 2024, the production house once again faced a controversy when they suddenly terminated actress Alisha Parveen Khan who was portraying second generation lead "Raahi Kapadia" in Anupamaa and got her replaced within few hours by Adrija Roy. Regarding her termination Khan said, "It is shocking and disappointing. I am not sure what exactly happened and why I am being replaced! Today was my last day on the set of Anupamaa."
