= Taher Shabbir =

Indian actor

- Born: Taher Shabbir Mithaiwala
- Education: K.C. College, Mumbai
- Occupation: Actor
- Years active: 2014–present
- Known for: Nisha Aur Uske Cousins; Bepannah
- Spouse: Akshita Gandhi (m. 2020)

Taher Shabbir Mithaiwala is an Indian actor who works in Hindi films. He is known for his portrayal of Viraj Singh Rathore in Nisha Aur Uske Cousins and Arshad Habib in Bepannah.

== Personal life ==
Shabbir graduated with a degree in mass media from KC College, Mumbai. Shabbir became engaged to Akshita Gandhi in August 2020. The two married in November 2020.

== Career ==
Shabbir rose to prominence in 2014 by portraying Viraj Singh Rathore in Star Plus's Nisha Aur Uske Cousins opposite Aneri Vajani and Mishkat Varma.

He made his film debut in 2016 with Fan where he played Sid Kapoor. In 2017, he portrayed Jai in Naam Shabana.

In 2018, Shabbir portrayed Arshad Habib in Colors TV's Bepannaah opposite Jennifer Winget and Harshad Chopda.

In 2019, he played Sangram Singh in Manikarnika. Next he was seen as Jimmy in Bypass Road. In 2020, he portrayed Danish Ali Baig in Netflix India's Guilty. Next, he played Pratyush Parashar in Iti: Can You Solve Your Own Murder.

== Filmography ==
=== Television ===
Year	Show	Role
2014–2015	Nisha Aur Uske Cousins	Viraj Singh Rathore
2018	Bepannaah	Arshad Habib

=== Films ===
Year	Film	Role
2009	Kurbaan	Tahir
2016	Fan	Sid Kapoor
2017	Naam Shabana	Jai Pal
2019	Manikarnika: The Queen of Jhansi	Sangram Singh
2019	Bypass Road	Jimmy
2020	Guilty	Danish Ali Baig
TBA	Iti: Can You Solve Your Own Murder	Pratyush Parashar

=== Web series ===
Year	Title	Role	Platform	Ref
2020	Hundred	–	Disney+Hotstar	
2020	Poison 2	Tony Sequira	ZEE5	
2021	Bekaaboo 2	Kiyan Roy	ALTBalaji	
2023	Kaala	Naman Arya	Disney+Hotstar	
