= Kanchi Singh =

Indian television actress (born 1996)

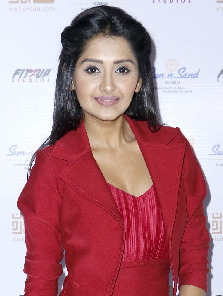
- Singh in 2019
- Born: 27 March 1996 (age 30); Indore, Madhya Pradesh, India
- Occupation: Actress
- Years active: 2003–present
- Known for: Yeh Rishta Kya Kehlata Hai

Kanchi Singh (born 27 March 1996) is an Indian television actress. She is known for portraying Gayatri Deora in StarPlus's Yeh Rishta Kya Kehlata Hai and Avni Khandelwal in Aur Pyaar Ho Gaya.

== Acting career ==
=== 2003–2012: Early works ===
Singh began her journey into television as she featured in a small role as child artist for the television series Kutumb in 2003 at the age of 9. However, she took a break from acting to focus on her further studies.

Eight years later, Singh made a comeback at the age of 17 with Colors TV's Sasural Simar Ka in 2011 wherein she played Cherry Bharadwaj, a member of the male lead's family. As there were not many scenes for her in it, she made an exit from it in 2012.

=== 2014–present: Breakthrough ===
The breakthrough for Singh came in December 2013 as she joined Zee TV's January 2014-starting series Aur Pyaar Ho Gaya as Avni Khandelwal, a girl belonging to a Rajasthani business family opposite Mishkat Varma. She was noticed for her performance, before it went off culmination in December 2014.

Post her breakthrough Singh became a part for an episode of Pyaar Tune Kya Kiya as Veebha opposite Rohit Suchanti in the ending month of Aur Pyaar Ho Gaya and then an episode of Bhakton Ki Bhakti Mein Shakti on Life OK as Hansa.

In 2016, Singh signed Star Plus' longest-running drama Yeh Rishta Kya Kehlata Hai portraying the parallel lead Gayatri "Gayu" Deora, alongside Mohsin Khan and Fahad Ali.

In 2018, Singh appeared on the reality series Box Cricket League to play for Lucknow Nawabs. A year later, she took participation in Kitchen Champion 5 on Colors along with Rohan Mehra.

== Personal life ==
Singh was dating her co-star Rohan Mehra of Yeh Rishta Kya Kehlata Hai since 2016, but they broke up in 2021.

== Filmography ==
=== Films ===
Year	Title	Role	Notes	Ref.
2024	Forbidden Love	Neha		
2025	Udaipur Files			

=== Television ===
Year	Title	Role	Notes	Ref.
2003	Kutumb	—N/a	Child artist	
2011–2012	Sasural Simar Ka	Cherry Bharadwaj		
2014	Aur Pyaar Ho Gaya	Avni Purohit		
2014	Pyaar Tune Kya Kiya	Veebha	Season 4; Episode 13	
2016	Bhakton Ki Bhakti Mein Shakti	Hansa		
2016–2017	Yeh Rishta Kya Kehlata Hai	Gayatri "Gayu" Deora		
2018	Box Cricket League	Contestant		
2019	Kitchen Champion 5	Herself	Episode 42	

== See also ==
- List of Indian television actresses
