= Crazy Stupid Love =

Crazy Stupid Love may refer to:

- Crazy, Stupid, Love, a 2011 romantic comedy film
- "Crazy Stupid Love" (song), a 2014 song by Cheryl Cole
- "Crazy Stupid Love", a song by Twice from their 2023 EP Ready to Be
- Crazy Stupid Ishq (lit. 'Crazy Stupid Love'), Indian youth television drama
