= Pavitra Bhagya =

Indian drama television series

- Genre: Drama; Romance
- Created by: Ekta Kapoor
- Developed by: Ekta Kapoor
- Screenplay by: Gautam Hegde
- Story by: Pavni Mehandiratta
- Directed by: Aniruddha Rajderkar
- Creative director: Somnath Kamble
- Starring: See below
- Opening theme: Ishq Hay....
- Country of origin: India
- Original language: Hindi
- No. of seasons: 1
- No. of episodes: 74

Production
- Producers: Ekta Kapoor; Shobha Kapoor
- Production locations: Mumbai, India
- Editors: Vikas Sharma; Vishal Sharma; Sandip Bhatt
- Camera setup: Multi-camera
- Running time: 20-25 minutes
- Production company: Balaji Telefilms

Original release
- Network: Colors TV
- Release: 2 March – 2 October 2020

Pavitra Bhagya (transl. Sacred Fate) is an Indian romantic drama television series produced by Ekta Kapoor under her banner Balaji Telefilms. It aired from 2 March 2020 to 2 October 2020 on Colors TV and starred Aneri Vajani, Kunal Jaisingh, Vaishnavi Prajapati and Riva Arora.

== Plot ==
The story is about college-mates Pranati Mishra and Reyansh Khurana who fall in love but go their separate ways when Reyansh learns that Pranati is pregnant. Pranati gives birth to a daughter. Shobha sends the baby to an orphanage. Eight years later, Pranati learns about the existence of her daughter, Jugnu, and she and Reyansh are given joint custody of her for six months. Pranati moves into the Khurana house where the story continues with a few sub-plots such as the mystery of the death behind Reyansh's mother, Riya and Armaan's love story, the custody battle of Jugnu, Archit and Navya sibling relations, Jugnu's kidnapping, the evil intentions of elder brother Vardhan and Mallika who wants to marry Reyansh. On Pranati's birthday, Reyansh's family has to move back to their old house because Vardhan has been sent to jail. Pranati and Reyansh do the pooja in the old house where the story ends off with Reyansh asking Pranati inside his head to marry him and Pranati responds saying yes in her head.

== Cast ==
=== Main ===
- Aneri Vajani as Pranati Mishra Khurana – Shobhna and Madan's elder daughter; Prabhas and Chetna's sister; Archit's ex-fiancée; Reyansh's ex-girlfriend turned fiancée; Jugnu's mother
- Kunal Jaisingh as Reyansh Khurana – Shamsher and Anjana's younger son; Vardhan's brother; Armaan and Maan's cousin; Pranati's ex-boyfriend turned fiancée, Jugnu's father
- Vaishnavi Prajapati / Riva Arora as Jugnu Khurana – Pranati and Reyansh's daughter

=== Recurring ===
- Vibha Chibber as Baljeet Khurana – Shamsher and Sangram's mother; Vardhan, Reyansh, Armaan and Maan's grandmother; Jugnu's great-grandmother
- Sherrin Varghese as Shamsher Khurana – Baljeet's elder son; Sangram's brother; Anjana's husband; Vardhan and Reyansh's father; Jugnu's grandfather
- Anjali Gupta as Anjana Khurana – Shamsher's wife; Vardhan and Reyansh's mother; Jugnu's grandmother
- Bhavya Sachdeva as Vardhan Khurana – Shamsher and Anjana's elder son; Reyansh's brother; Armaan and Maan's cousin; Anisha's husband
- Charu Mehra as Anisha Khurana – Vardhan's wife
- Jaideep Singh as Sangram Khurana – Baljeet's younger son; Shamsher's brother; Bindiya's husband; Armaan and Maan's father
- Roma Bali as Bindiya Khurana – Sangram's wife; Armaan and Maan's mother
- Mohit Hiranandani as Armaan Khurana – Bindiya and Sangram's elder son; Maan's brother; Vardhan and Reyansh's cousin; Navya's ex-lover; Riya's husband
- Prema Mehta as Riya Gehlot Khurana – Vishambar's daughter; Sameer's sister; Armaan's wife
- Yatin Mehta as Maan Khurana – Bindiya and Sangram's younger son; Armaan's brother; Vardhaan and Reyansh's cousin; Navya's love-interest
- Ajay Chakraborty as Madan Mishra – Shobhna's husband; Prabhas, Pranati and Chetna's father; Jugnu's grandfather
- Ruma Rajni as Shobhna Mishra – Madan's wife; Prabhas, Pranati and Chetna's mother; Jugnu's grandmother
- Pratiksha Rai as Chetna Mishra – Shobhna and Madan's younger daughter; Prabhas and Pranati's sister
- Jatin Shah as Prabhas Mishra – Shobhna and Madan's son; Pranati and Chetna's brother; Pallavi's husband
- Piyali Munsi as Pallavi Mishra – Prabhas's wife
- Abhishek Verma as Archit Ahuja – Mr. Ahuja and Sumitra's son; Navya and Nupur's brother; Pranati's ex-fiancé
- Vibha Bhagat / Divyajyotee Sharma as Sumitra Ahuja – Mr. Ahuja's wife; Archit, Navya and Nupur's mother
- Karan Sharma as Mr. Ahuja – Sumitra's husband; Archit, Navya and Nupur's father
- Avantika Choudhary as Navya Ahuja – Mr. Ahuja and Sumitra's elder daughter; Archit and Nupur's sister; Armaan's ex-lover; Maan's love-interest
- Ruby Bharaj as Nupur Ahuja – Mr. Ahuja and Sumitra's younger daughter; Archit and Navya's sister
- Param Nagar as Dilsher Singh – Reyansh's best friend
- Aashish Kaul as Vishambhar Gehlot – Riya and Sameer's father
- Vidyut Xavier as Sameer Gehlot – Vishambhar's son; Riya's brother; Mallika's fiancé
- Neha Pednekar as Mallika – Mantri's daughter; Reyansh's ex-lover; Sameer's fiancée
- Karan Taneja as Matron's assistant
- Ahmad Harhash as Maan Khanna – Bindiya and Sangram's son;

== Production ==
=== Development ===
The series was mainly filmed at the sets in Killick Nixon studio.

The production and airing of the show was halted indefinitely in late March 2020 due to the COVID-19 outbreak in India. Because of the outbreak, the filming of the series was halted on 19 March 2020. After three months, the filming resumed and new episodes started airing from 13 July 2020. Vaishnavi Prajapati was replaced by Riva Arora as Jugnu.

On 12 July 2020, the filming of the series was halted for a few days when Parth Samthaan from Kasautii Zindagii Kay, filmed at the same studio, was tested positive for COVID-19.

=== Cancellation and future ===
Post COVID-19 break, when the series resumed in July, it had a drastic ratings drop and the show was abruptly ended on 2 October 2020 midway despite having a bank of 12 episodes. Pavitra Bhagya was scheduled to come back with season 2 post Bigg Boss 14. In January 2021, Bigg Boss 14 Was extended till February 2021 which led to the cancellation of Pavitra Bhagya 2.

== Reception ==
The Times of India quoted that Aneri Vajani and Kunal Jaisingh's show looks promising; child actor Vaishnavi Prajapati steals the limelight and said, "Jugnu in Pavitra Bhagya stands out as a child actor. Sporting a tomboy look, Jugnu's level of naughtiness and attitude is level: Boss. With a fresh cast, the storyline of Pavitra Bhagya is also interesting and promising. However, Aneri’s Pranati is a bit over the top when it comes to showing her emotional moments. Abhishek's character Archit is also quite progressive and we can see in the upcoming episodes if his role stays the same. Kunal Jaisingh is good with the Casanova image and he is justifying his role as Reyansh aka Rey."
