= Dilo Ki Ram Leela =

Indian family drama television series

- Genre: Family drama Romance
- Written by: Dialogues: Rajesh Chawla
- Directed by: Mahim Joshi; Jaffer Shaikh
- Starring: Mishkat Verma; Aastha Sharma
- Country of origin: India
- Original language: Hindi
- No. of seasons: 1
- No. of episodes: 60

Production
- Producers: Pradeep Kumar; Rajesh Ram Singh; Pia Bajpiee; Shaika Parween
- Camera setup: Multi camera
- Running time: 20–22 minutes
- Production companies: Cockcrow Entertainment; Shaika Films

Original release
- Network: Zee TV
- Release: 24 August 2026 – present

Dilo Ki Ram Leela (transl. The Play of Leela and Ram of Hearts) is an Indian Hindi-language romantic family drama television series airing from 24 August 2026 on Zee TV and streams digitally on ZEE5. The show is produced by Cockrow and Shaika Films. An official remake of the Telugu series Ammayi Garu of Zee Telugu, the series stars Mishkat Varma, Aastha Sharma, Eijaz Khan and Manasi Salvi. The story revolves around an innocent young girl Leela from wealthy family, who has been waiting for years to get the love of her father.

== Cast ==
=== Main ===
- Mishkat Varma as Ram Kumar: Vaishali and Purshottam's son; Bhagyashree and Tejashree's brother (2026–present)
- Aastha Sharma as Leela Sehgal: Ragini and Veerendra's daughter (2026–present)
- Eijaz Khan as Veerendra Sehgal: Vijaya's brother; Ragini's ex husband; Leela's father (2026–present)
- Manasi Salvi as Vijaya Sehgal: Veerendra's sister; Moksha's mother (2026–present)

=== Recurring ===
- Ashlesha Sawant as Ragini Sehgal: Saroj's daughter; Veerendra's ex wife; Leela's mother; Harpreet's friend (2026–present)
- Bharatt Bhatia as Jatin Bhalla: Mr. Bhalla and Alka's son; Moksha's husband (2026–present)
- Isha Pandhe as Moksha Sehgal Bhalla: Vijaya's daughter; Jatin's wife (2026–present)
- Sushil Raj Khosla as Surendra Sehgal: Vandana's husband; Pinky's father (2026–present)
- Preetika Chauhan as Vandana Sehgal: Surendra's wife; Pinky's mother (2026–present)
- Madhvendra Jha as Purushottam Kumar: Vaishali's husband; Ram, Bhagyashree and Tejashree's father; Aishu's grandfather (2026–present)
- Charul Bhavsar as Vaishali Kumar: Purushottam's wife; Ram, Bhagyashree and Tejashree's mother; Aishu's grandmother (2026–present)
- Ankita Khare as Bhagyashree Kumar: Vaishali and Purshottam's elder daughter; Ram and Tejashree's sister; Babu's wife; Aishu's mother (2026–present)
- Anoop Girii as Babu: Bhagyashree's husband; Aishu's father (2026–present)
- Heeral Bhojwani as Aishu; Bhagyashree and Babu's daughter (2026–present)
- Oshi Saahu as Tejashree "Teju" Kumar: Vaishali and Purshottam's younger daughter; Ram and Bhagyashree's sister (2026–present)
- Nishani Borule as Naina Shrivastava: Meenakshi and Mandan's daughter; Ram's one sided lover (2026–present)
- Kammal Dadialla as Meenakshi Shrivastava: Mandan's wife; Naina's mother (2026–present)
- Vinayak Bhave as Mandan Mohan Shrivastava: Meenakshi's husband; Naina's father (2026–present)
- Alfaraz Shaikh as Naina's brother (2026–present)
- Bharat Narang as Maddy (2026–present)
- Naina Gupta as Harpreet Brar: Ragini's friend (2026–present)
- Neena Cheema as Saroj: Ragini's mother; Leela's grandmother (2026–present)

== Production ==
=== Casting ===
Mishkat Varma and Aastha Sharma were roped to play the titular roles, Ram and Leela respectively. Eijaz Khan and Manasi Salvi were signed to portray grey shaded characters. Charul Bhavsar was cast to play Vaishali Kumar. Bharatt Bhatia and Bharat Narang joined the show in pivotal roles. In September 2026, Naina Gupta entered the show. In the same month, Ashlesha Sawant also joined the show as Ragini, Leela's mother.

=== Release ===
The first promo of the series featuring the prominent cast members were released in May 2026. The second promo confirming the premiere date was released in August 2026. Dilo Ki Ram Leela premiered on 24 August 2026 replacing Jagadhatri at 10 p.m. slot.

== Adaptations ==
Language	Title	Original release	Network(s)	Last aired	Notes	Ref.
Telugu	Ammayi Garu అమ్మాయి గారూ	31 October 2022	Zee Telugu	19 December 2025	Original	
Kannada	Shravani Subramanya ಶ್ರಾವಣಿ ಸುಬ್ರಹ್ಮಣ್ಯ	18 March 2024	Zee Kannada	4 September 2026	Remake	
Tamil	Valliyin Velan வள்ளியின் வேலன்	2 September 2024	Zee Tamil	25 May 2025	Remake	
Malayalam	Akale അകലെ	25 November 2024	Zee Keralam	Ongoing	Remake	
Marathi	Shubh Shravani शुभ श्रावणी	19 January 2026	Zee Marathi	19 September 2026	Remake	
Bengali	Saat Paake Bandha সাত পাকে বাঁধা	19 March 2026	Zee Bangla	Ongoing	Remake	
Hindi	Dilo Ki Ram Leela दिलों की राम लीला	24 August 2026	Zee TV	Ongoing	Remake	
