= Hrishikesh Pandey =

Indian television actor (born 1974)

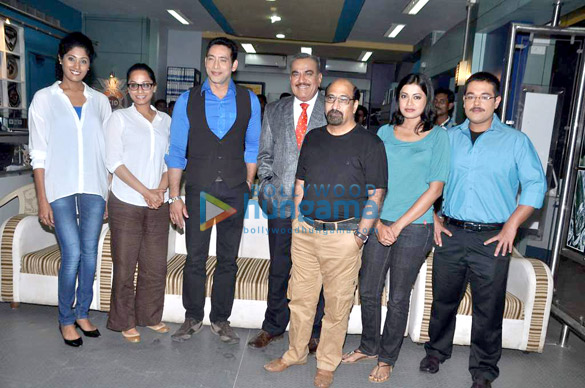
- Pandey with CID cast team in 2013.
- Occupation: Actor
- Years active: 2001–present
- Known for: Playing Inspector Sachin in C.I.D.
- Spouse: Trisha Dubash (m. 2004; div. 2021)

Hrishikesh Pandey is an Indian television actor best known for his role as Inspector Sachin in C.I.D. He was also seen in Jag Janani Maa Vaishno Devi – Kahani Mata Rani Ki as Maharaj Ratnakar Sagar, and in Hamari Betiyoon Ka Vivaah as Shakti.

== Early life ==
Pandey comes from an army background, and used to live in Jabalpur as a child. His childhood idol is veteran actor Amitabh Bachchan.

== Career ==
Pandey's career as an actor began in 2001 with the role of Vishal Gill in the serial Kohi Apna Sa broadcast by Zee TV. His subsequent roles include Shakti in Hamari Betiyoon Ka Vivaah, Inspector Sachin in C.I.D., Rocky in Aahat and recently as Senapati Ripudaman Singh in Porus. He is also seen in Dhai Akshar Prem Ke as Sameer 'Sam', Nisha's (Sonali Bendre) husband.

== Filmography ==
Year	Film	Role	Notes
2000	Dhai Akshar Prem Ke	Sameer "Sam"	Cameo
2022	Runway 34	Yusuf Rangoonwala	

== Television ==
Year	Serial	Role	Notes
2001	Ssshhhh...Koi Hai – Shart	Rahul Sharma (Episode 17)	Episodic Role
2001–2003	Kohi Apna Sa	Vishal Gill	Lead Role
2002	Sanjivani	Patient (Episode 7)	Episodic Role
2002	Ssshhhh...Koi Hai – Mrityudand	Senapati Adityavardhan (Episode 39)	Episodic Role
2003	Kahani Terrii Merrii	Shom	Supporting Role
2003	Kahaani Ghar Ghar Kii	Advocate Natkarni	Supporting Role
2003	Ssshhhh...Koi Hai	Episode 104	Episodic Role
2003	Vikraal Aur Gabraal	Rahul Sharma	Episodic Role
2004	Vikraal Aur Gabraal	Senapati Adityavardhan	Episodic Role
2004	Raat Hone Ko Hai	Episodes 9-12	Episodic Role
2004–2005	Saaksshi		Supporting Role
2004–2005	Piya Ka Ghar	Dr. Anurag	Supporting Role
2004–2005	Kamini Damini	Vijay	Supporting Role
2005	Raat Hone Ko Hai	Bobby Kapoor (Episode 241 to Episode 244)	Episodic Role
2005–2006	CID Special Bureau	Senior Inspector Abhimanyu	Supporting Role
2006	Sati...Satya Ki Shakti		Supporting Role
2006	Viraasat	Shekhar Sinha	Supporting Role
2007	Mano Ya Na Mano	Mahesh Saikya (Episode 70)	Episodic Role
2007–2008	Shaadi Street	Raj	Lead Role
2008	Ssshhhh...Phir Koi Hai	Brijesh (Episode 68 & Episode 69)	Episodic Role
2008–2009	Hamari Betiyoon Ka Vivaah	Shakti	Supporting Role
2009	Aahat – Kabristan: Part 1 & Part 2	Rocky (Episode 11 & Episode 12)	Episodic Role
2010–2016; 2025	CID	Senior Inspector Sachin	Supporting Role
2012	Adaalat – CID Virrudh Adaalat	Senior Inspector Sachin	Episode 137
2013	CID Chhote Heroes	Senior Inspector Sachin	Supporting Role
2014	Taarak Mehta Ka Ooltah Chashmah	Senior Inspector Sachin	Special appearance
2016	Man Mein Hai Visshwas	Akhtar Singh	
2017	Savdhaan India	Inspector Surendra (Episode 2028)	Episodic Role
2017–2018	Porus	Senapati Ripudaman Singh	Supporting Role
2019	Shrimad Bhagwat Mahapuran	Maharaj Daksh	Supporting Role
2019–2020	Jag Janani Maa Vaishno Devi – Kahani Mata Rani Ki	Maharaj Ratnakar Sagar	Supporting Role
2021	Yeh Rishta Kya Kehlata Hai	Mukesh	Negative Role
2022	Dharm Yoddha Garud	Maharishi Kashyap	Supporting Role
2023	Bekaboo	Valak	Supporting Role
2023	Bekaboo	Malak	Negative Role
2023–2024	Teri Meri Doriyaann	Yashraj "Yash" Baweja	Negative Role

== Personal life ==
He married Trisha Dubash in 2004 and they got divorced in 2021
