= Gaurav Gera =

Indian actor and comedian (born 1973)

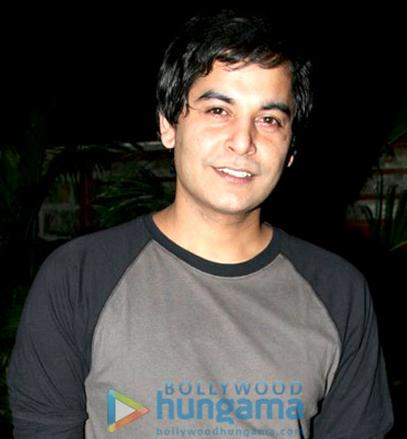
- Born: 23 September 1975 (age 51); Faridabad, Haryana, India
- Occupations: Actor; comedian; television presenter
- Years active: 2001–present

Gaurav Gera (born 23 September 1973) is an Indian comedian and actor who works in Hindi films and television. He has also worked in the Hindi musical Jhumroo. He is well known for playing the role of Nandu in Jassi Jaisi Koi Nahin. He gained further acclaim for his role in the 2025 film Dhurandhar and its sequel Dhurandhar: The Revenge (2026).

== Career ==
=== Television ===
Gera started his career with Life Nahin Hai Laddoo on Star Plus and then he played the supporting role as Nandu in Sony TV's show Jassi Jaisi Koi Nahin. He also appeared in various shows, Kohi Apna Sa, Baat Hamari Pakki Hai, Babban Bhai v/s Bimla Tai. He also played the lead role in Sab TV's show Tota Weds Maina and Colors TV show Mrs. Pammi Pyarelal. He also played the of CPR, the nurse, in the short series, Dr. Pran Lele. He was last seen in Colors TV's reality show Comedy Nights with Kapil as Dulari. In 2016, he made a cameo in the series Naagin as Chutki. He was also a participant on Jhalak Dikhhla Jaa. In 2019, he appeared in the Alt Balaji show Boss - Baap of Special Services where he essayed the role of Jignesh.

=== Films ===
Gera made his Hindi Movie debut with Kyun...! Ho Gaya Na, where he played a cameo role. In 2008, he played Vinay Pathak's younger brother Vivek in Dasvidaniya. He also gave cameo appearances in Chalo Dilli, Woodstock Villa, MP3: Mera Pehla Pehla Pyaar In 2015, he starred in MSG: The Messenger as Bhondu. He appeared in the role of Mohammed Aalam in Aditya Dhar's 2025 spy film Dhurandhar and its 2026 sequel Dhurandhar: The Revenge.

=== Other media ===
Gera is known for a range of characters he essays on his Snapchat and Instagram handles; these include the widely popular Shopkeeper, Chutki and Billi Massi, among others.

== Filmography ==
Key
†	Denotes films that have not yet been released

=== Film ===
Year	Film	Role
2004	Kyun...! Ho Gaya Na	Vinay Bhalla
2005	Neal 'n' Nikki	Happy Singh
2007	MP3: Mera Pehla Pehla Pyaar	Sameer Kohli
2007	Buddha Mar Gaya	Reporter
2008	Oh My God	Dr. Piddu
2008	Dasvidaniya	Vivek
2008	Woodstock Villa	Ajay
2010	Sky Ki Umeed	Veer & Bahadur
2011	Chalo Dilli	Gopi
2014	The Shaukeens	Bhanu
2015	MSG: The Messenger of God	Bhondu
2016	Mahayoddha Rama	One of Ravan's heads (voiceover)
2022	Kahani Rubberband Ki	
2025	Dhurandhar	Mohammed Aalam
2026	Dhurandhar: The Revenge	Mohammed Aalam

=== Television ===
Year(s)	Title	Role	Notes
2001	Ssshhhh...Koi Hai	Vishal	Episodic role
2001	Life Nahin Hai Laddoo	Laddoo	
2001	Love Mein Kabhi Kabhi		Cameo appearance
2001–2003	Kohi Apna Sa		Cameo
2003–2007	Jassi Jaisi Koi Nahin	Nandu	
2003	CID	Siddharth	Episode 261 and 262 - "The Case of the Nightmare"
2004	The Great Indian Comedy Show	Various characters	
2005	Hero - Bhakti Hi Shakti Hai	Cameraman Flash	
2006	CID	Pankaj	Episode 408 - "Yeh Phool Chaman Main Kaisa Khila"
2006	Ishq Ki Ghanti		
2007	Bathroom Singer	Host/presenter	
2008	Babban Bhai v/s Bimla Tai	Babban Bhai	
2009	Dekh India Dekh	Malti Manohar Mishra	Contestant
2009	Baat Hamari Pakki Hai	Pappu	Cameo appearance
2013	Tota Weds Maina	Tota Ram Tiwari	
2013	Mrs. Pammi Pyarelal	Param Gulati / Mrs. Pammi Pyarelal	
2013–2014	Comedy Nights with Kapil	Dulari	Cameo
2015	Chutki Shopkeeper Aur Woh	Chutki	
2016	Naagin	Chutki	
2016	Comedy Nights Live	Chutki	Episode 23
2016	Jhalak Dikhhla Jaa 9	Contestant	Eliminated, 2nd week - 14 August 2016
2017	Bigg Boss 11	Pinky Padosan	Guest
2019	BOSS: Baap of Special Services	Jignesh	
2019	Kitchen Champion	Participant/Chutki	
2020	Bhalla Calling Bhalla	Gogi	Web series released on ZEE5
2021	Chef vs Fridge	Host	

=== Music video ===
- Harega Nahi India (2020) - sung by Gaurav Sharma

== Personal life ==
Gera has stated in an interview that he doesn't have a spouse or children of his own, and prefers his current life in Oshiwara, Mumbai.
