= Ram Bhavan =

Indian family drama television series

- Genre: Family drama
- Created by: Rahul Kumar Tewary
- Developed by: Amirtharaj; Muthuselvan
- Starring: Khushbu Rajendra; Mishkat Varma
- Country of origin: India
- Original language: Hindi
- No. of seasons: 1
- No. of episodes: 156

Production
- Producer: Rahul Kumar Tewary
- Camera setup: Multi-camera
- Running time: 20–25 minutes
- Production company: Rolling Tales Productions

Original release
- Network: Colors TV
- Release: 29 January – 11 July 2025

Ram Bhavan is an Indian Hindi-language television family drama series which aired from 29 January 2025 to 11 July 2025 on Colors TV and streams digitally on JioHotstar. It is produced by Rahul Kumar Tewary under Rolling Tales Productions and stars Khushbu Rajendra and Mishkat Varma. It is an official remake of the Tamil TV series Deivamagal.

== Plot ==
Set in the heart of Prayagraj, Ram Bhavan tells the story of a crumbling mansion that has witnessed decades of family feuds and shifting power dynamics. The show spotlights the clash between Om Vajpayee, a resourceful and ambitious young man, and his cunning sister-in-law, Gayatri, who holds the reins of the family's fortune, as well as Isha, a tenacious woman, navigating her way through life's challenges while battling Gayatri's oppressive rule. Together, Om and Isha take on Gayatri in a battle that threatens to shake the foundations of Ram Bhavan.

== Cast ==
=== Main ===
- Khushbu Rajendra as Isha "Ishu" Mishra Vajpayee: Subhash and Sumitra's daughter, Milli and Anjali's elder sister; Om's wife (2025)
- Mishkat Varma as Om Ramdas Vajpayee: Mrs and Ramdas's second son; Jagdish, Jay and Ragini's brother; Isha's husband (2025)
- Samiksha Jaiswal as Gayatri Vajpayee: Jagdish's wife; Naysa's mother (2025)

=== Recurring ===
- Vijay Kashyap as Ramdas Vajpayee: Jagdish, Jay, Om and Ragini's father
- Hitanshu Jinsi as Dhruv Shukla: Maya's son
- Waseem Mushtaq as Jagdish Vajpayee: Ramdas's eldest son; Gayatri's husband; Naysa's father; Jay, Om, and Ragini's brother
- Aliraza Namdar as Dilip Singh
- Sudesh Berry as Subhash Mishra: Sumitra's husband; Isha's father (Dead)
- Seema Kapoor as Maya Shukla: Dhruv's mother
- Anindita Sinha as Sumitra Subhash Mishra: Subhash's widow; Isha's mother
- Amit Poddar as Jay Vajpayee: Ramdas's son; Jagdish, Om and Ragini's brother
- Srushti Mishra as Ragini Vajpayee: Jagdish, Jay and Om's sister; Ramdas's daughter
- Vikash Tiwari as Murari: Om's friend
- Shalu Shreya as Mala Vajpayee
- Summit Jaiswal as Sunny
- Ajay Chaudhary as Raghvendra Thakur
- Aneri Vajani as Shivani
- Shanu Rao as Sana

== Production ==
=== Casting ===
Mishkat Varma was cast as male lead Om Ramdas Vajpayee. Khushbu Tiwari was roped in as female lead, Isha Mishra. Samiksha Jaiswal was signed to play the negative lead. Seema Kapoor was cast as Maya Shukla. In May 2025, Ajay Chaudhary entered as Raghvendra Thakur, a politician.

=== Release ===
The promo was released in January 2025 introducing the leads.
