= Aneri Vajani =

Indian television actress (born 1994)

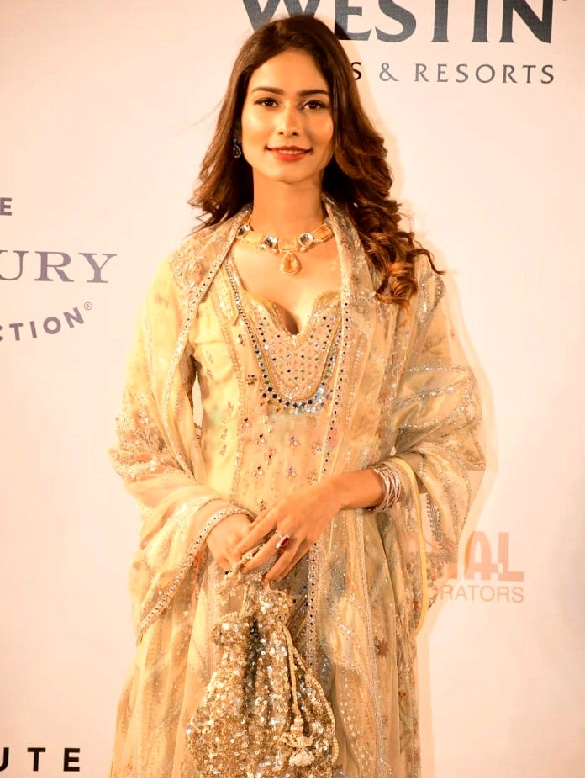
- Vajani in 2023
- Born: 26 March 1994 (age 32)
- Occupation: Actress
- Years active: 2012–present
- Known for: Nisha Aur Uske Cousins; Beyhadh; Silsila Badalte Rishton Ka Season 2 Anupamaa "Khatron ke Khiladi season 12"

Aneri Vajani (born 26 March 1994) is an Indian actress who primarily works in Hindi television. She made her acting debut with Kaali – Ek Punar Avatar as Paakhi in 2012. Vajani is best known for her portrayal of Nisha Gangwal in Nisha Aur Uske Cousins and Saanjh Mathur in Beyhadh. Vajani has also portrayed Pari Malhotra in the series Silsila Badalte Rishton Ka 2, Pranati Mishra in Pavitra Bhagya and Malvika Kapadia in Anupamaa. In 2022, She participated in the reality show Khatron Ke Khiladi 12 where she finished at 13th place

== Early life ==
Vajani was born on 26 March 1994 in a Gujarati family.

== Career ==
=== Debut and breakthrough (2012-2015) ===
Vajani made her acting debut with the role of Paakhi in Kaali – Ek Punar Avatar in 2012. It ended in 2013 and was based on the famous Nitish Katara murder case. She then played Shanaya Khan in the 2013 show Crazy Stupid Ishq alongside Hiba Nawab, Harsh Rajput and Vishal Vashishtha.

Vajani portrayed Nisha Gangwal Kumar in Nisha Aur Uske Cousins opposite Mishkat Varma from 2014 to 2015. Her performance as Nisha earned her nomination at Indian Telly Award for Indian Telly Award for Fresh New Face - Female. She next played Arushi, a swimmer in Pyaar Tune Kya Kiya Season 7.

=== Success and recent work (2016-present) ===
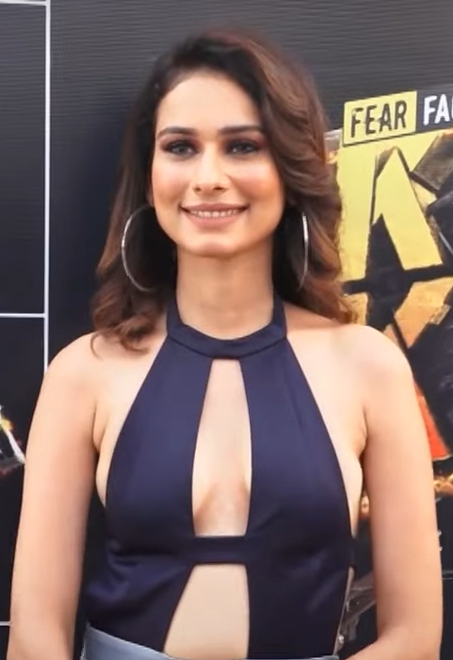
Vajani at an event

Vajani next portrayed Saanjh Mathur Sharma in Beyhadh opposite Kushal Tandon and Jennifer Winget from 2016 to 2017. She received praises for her performance. She then appeared as Riddhi in Yeh Hai Aashiqui Season 4 where she reunited with Varma.

In 2016, she featured in Arre's I Don't Watch TV as Tulsi. It marked her web debut. In 2018, she played Shreya in Laal Ishq opposite Samridh Bawa. She portrayed Pari Malhotra in her second web show, Voot's Silsila Badalte Rishton Ka Season 2 opposite Kunal Jaisingh.

Vajani then played Pranati Mishra Khurana in Pavitra Bhagya, where she reunited with Jaisingh. She received ITA Award for Best Actress Popular nomination for her performance. She next appeared as Arundhati Singh in MX Player's web series Cookiees.

She made her film debut with the Telugu film FCUK: Father Chitti Umaa Kaarthik where she was seen as Priyanka. She also played a character named Aneri in the short film I Hate Goodbyes.

From 2021 to 2022, she started portraying Malavika Kapadia in Anupamaa. She quit the show permanently in 2022 to participate in Fear Factor: Khatron Ke Khiladi 12 claiming that "there is no scope of coming back as it's all over for her role". In March 2025, she entered as Shivani in Colors TV's Ram Bhavan.

== Filmography ==
=== Television ===
Year	Serial	Role	Notes	Ref(s)
2012–2013	Kaali – Ek Punar Avatar	Paakhi	Debut show	
2013	Crazy Stupid Ishq	Shanaya Khan		
2014–2015	Nisha Aur Uske Cousins	Nisha Gangwal		
2015	Pyaar Tune Kya Kiya 7	Arushi		
2016	Yeh Hai Aashiqui 4	Riddhi	Episode: "Secret Marriage"	
2016–2017	Beyhadh	Saanjh Mathur		
2018	Laal Ishq	Shreya	Episode: "Shraap"	
2020	Pavitra Bhagya	Pranati Mishra		
2021–2022	Anupamaa	Malavika "Mukku" Kapadia		
2022	Fear Factor: Khatron Ke Khiladi 12	Contestant	13th place	
2024	Baghin	Gauri/Baghin		
2025	Ram Bhavan	Shivani		

=== Web series ===
Year	Show	Role	Ref.
2016	I Don't Watch TV	Tulsi	
2019	Silsila Badalte Rishton Ka Season 2	Pari Malhotra	
2020	Cookiees	Arundhati Singh	

=== Films ===
Year	Title	Role	Language	Notes	Ref.
2021	FCUK: Father Chitti Umaa Kaarthik	Priyanka	Telugu		
2021	I Hate Goodbyes	Aneri	Hindi	Short film	
2026	Jai Kanhaiyalall Ki		Gujarati		

=== Music videos ===
Year	Title	Singer(s)	Ref.
2022	Phase	Sarthak Saksena	
2022	Aashiq Hoon	Raj Barman	

== Awards and nominations ==
Year	Award	Category	Work	Result	Ref.
2015	Indian Telly Awards	Fresh New Face - Female	Nisha Aur Uske Cousins	Nominated	
2015	Asian Viewers Television Awards	Female Actor Of The Year	Nisha Aur Uske Cousins	Nominated	
2022	Indian Television Academy Awards	Best Actress (Popular)	Pavitra Bhagya	Nominated	

== See also ==
- List of Indian television actresses
- List of Hindi television actresses
