= Dinesh Mahadev =

Indian director of television shows

- Education: Narsee Monjee College of Commerce and Economics
- Occupation: Television director
- Years active: 1996–present

Dinesh Mahadev is an Indian director of television shows. He directed shows like Savadhan India, Brahmarakshas, Rakshak, Kaali – Ek Punar Avatar, Jersey No. 10, Laagi Tujhse Lagan, Na Aana Is Des Laado, Ruk Jaana Nahin, Main Lakshmi Tere Aangan Ki, Bhramarakshas.

Mahadev joined the industry in 1996 as a camera attendant to Prakash Mehra and then he has worked as assistant to J. P. Dutta. Later, he moved over to television as a director.
