= Mihika Verma =

Indian actress and model (b.1985)

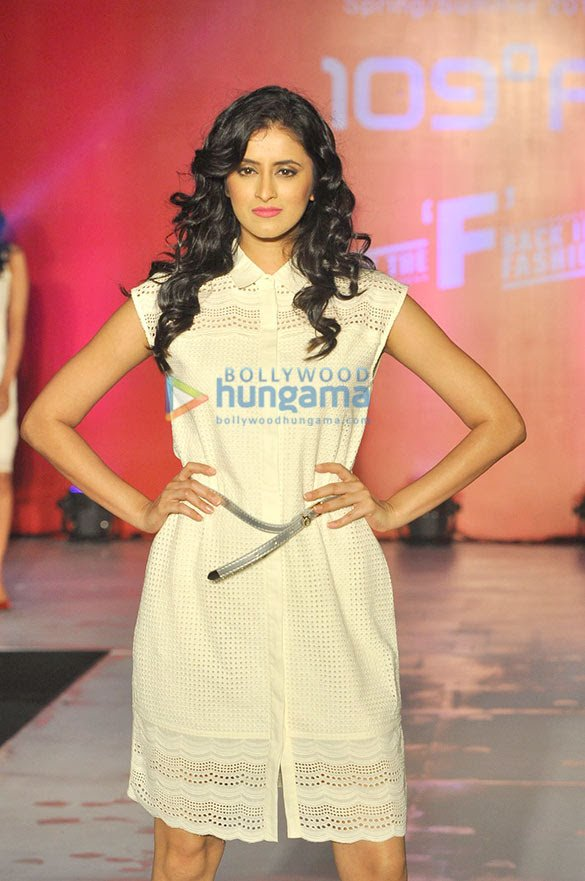
- Born: 3 January 1985 (age 41); Bombay, Maharashtra, India
- Occupations: Actress; model
- Years active: 2004–2016
- Notable work: Yeh Hai Mohabbatein
- Spouse: Anand Kapai (m. 2016)
- Children: 1
- Relatives: Mishkat Varma (brother)

Mihika Kapai (née Varma; born 3 January 1985), born and known professionally as Mihika Varma is an Indian former television actress and model. She won the Miss India International title in 2004 and represented India in the Miss International 2004 competition. She started her acting career by debuting in the series Viruddh. Varma Poratyed The Character of Mihika Iyer in Yeh Hai Mohabbatein . She played a supporting role in the serial Baat Hamari Pakki Hai. She played the role of Fiza in Yeh Hai Aashiqui. She later got married and left her acting career to settle with her husband in the US.

== Personal life ==
Mihika Verma has a younger brother, Mishkat Varma who is also an actor.

Mihika married US-based NRI Anand Kapai on 29 April 2016 in Delhi when she left Yeh Hai Mohabbatein. They have a son named Izaan Kapai.

== Television ==
Year	Show	Role
2004	Get Gorgeous	Contestant (Season 1 winner)
2007–2008	Virrudh	Shreya
2009	Kitani Mohabbat Hai	Natasha Mittal
2008	Tujh Sang Preet Lagai Sajna	Bhumika
2008-2010	Kis Desh Mein Hai Meraa Dil	Ashlesha Maan
2010–2011	Baat Hamari Pakki Hai	Neeta
2013	Yeh Hai Aashiqui	Fiza
2013–2016	Ye Hai Mohabbatein	Mihika Ashok Khanna/Iyer Bhalla
2014	Ajeeb Dastaan Hai Yeh	Shikha
2014–2015	Box Cricket League 1	Contestant
2015	Itna Karo Na Mujhe Pyar	Rupali Basu

Preceded by Shonali Nagrani	Femina Miss India International; 2004	Succeeded by Vaishali Desai
