= Tota Weds Maina =

Indian sitcom series

- Inter-title of Tota Weds Maina
- Genre: Comedy
- Written by: Anshuman Chaturvedi
- Starring: See below
- Theme music composer: Abhijeet Hegdepatil
- Country of origin: India
- Original language: Hindi
- No. of seasons: 1
- No. of episodes: 59

Production
- Producer: Naren Kumar
- Running time: 21 minutes
- Production company: Miloni Pictures

Original release
- Network: SAB TV
- Release: 14 January – 5 April 2013

Tota Weds Maina is an Indian Comedy-Drama television show, which premiered on 14 January 2013 and was broadcast on SAB TV. The show starred Gaurav Gera and Kavita Kaushik.

== Cast ==
- Gaurav Gera as Totaram Tiwari
- Kavita Kaushik as Maina Shukla
- Atul Srivastava as Tota's Father
- Samta Sagar as Ramdulari (Tota's Mother)
- Samiksha Bhatt as Aarti
- Surbhi Tiwari as Pushpa
- Sushil Bounthiyal as Totaram's Uncle
- Sandesh Nayak
- Kajal Nishad as Ram Katori Chachi
- Ishtiyaq Khan
- Priyani Vani
- Shyamlal
- Eklavya Bhetaria
- Simran Natekar
- Shahnawaz Pradhan
- Ranjeet as Thakur Ghamashaan
