= Ruk Jaana Nahin =

Indian soap opera

- Saanchi
- Genre: Drama
- Created by: Kamadgiri Productions; Playtime Creationn
- Written by: Kamal Pandey; Garima Goyal; Girish Dhamija
- Directed by: Santram Varma Dinesh Mahadev, Ramesh Pandey
- Starring: See below
- Country of origin: India
- Original languages: Hindi; Awadhi
- No. of seasons: 1
- No. of episodes: 248

Production
- Producers: Kamal Pandey; Paresh Rawal; Hemal Thakkar; Swaroop Sampat
- Production locations: Varanasi; Mumbai
- Cinematography: Dinesh Singh
- Production companies: Kamadgiri Productions; Playtime Creationn

Original release
- Network: STAR Plus
- Release: 19 December 2011 – 23 November 2012

Ruk Jaana Nahin is an Indian soap opera that premiered on 19 December 2011 on STAR Plus and ended on 23 November 2012. The series starred Pooja Sharma and Aniruddh Dave.

== Plot ==
Sanchi, the main character, is a vulnerable girl who has led a sheltered life. She shifts with her family to the city of Varanasi and begins to pursue her college education. Once she steps out of the security of her home, she realizes that she can’t always win through confrontation in the male-dominated society. She decides to own every heart and rule every mind with her intelligence and presence of mind. What makes Sanchi different from any other protagonist on television is that she does not confront and fight, she does not protest or walk away. She faces the challenges and changes decisions and attitudes of one and all with her intelligent approach. A never-before-seen character on Indian television, Sanchi is an ordinary girl from your neighborhood who emerges as a beacon of hope as she navigates her way through the world in a quest to fend for herself and her family. A goon name Indu falls in love with her. He troubles Saanchi and her family. After that Sanchi vows to keep Indu away from her family as she him a lot. Indu comes to Sanchi's house to finalize the marriage which is next day Sanchi bravely says yes the next day she dresses up like a dancer and come to the marriage. She wants the address of his mother to inform about whats happening. She is successful in her plan with her best friend. but when Indu's mother comes she is convinced to see Sanchi and agrees with her son. Sanchi's plan fails that moment and she plans for some other trick. She calls the panditji to see horoscope the panditji is in the side of Sanchi and tells a lie to Indu and his mother that if Sanchi marries him that means Indu's mother will die. Indu broken hearted for his mother's sake leaves Sanchi and goes. Even if he left Sanchi but it was difficult for him to forget her from his heart and mind for this Indu's mother comes to Sanchi's house for a plan to make Indu hate Sanchi forever. she tells her to wear modern clothes in front of Indu which Indu will dislike. she follows her instruction and wears modern clothes to college next day. Indu gets furious seeing Sanchi in short dress. While the college people are shocked to see Sanchi in short dress. They flirt with her. Seeing this Indu gets more angry. He goes in the classroom and bangs on the door tells everybody to come out of the classroom. He tells Sanchi to wear full clothes and Sanchi comes to tell him that who are you to tell me what should I wear. Listening to this he walks away from her and get heavily drunk. The next day she wears modern clothes and comes to indu's house. by indu's mother's plan Sanchi insults him and walks away from there Indu gets hurt. While Sanchi is walking on the road some boys come and flirt with her. Indu sees this and goes to her he hits the boys and the boys run away. Furious Indu gives money to her tells her to buy good clothes.

The question is will Sanchi accept Indu? or will She tell him the truth about the plan?

== Cast ==
Character	Played by	Role
Saanchi Mathur Singh	Pooja Sharma	Veena And Tarachand ‘s Daughter
Indu Singh	Aniruddh Dave	
Veena Tarachand Mathur		Saanchi's mother
Tarachand Mathur	Gyan Prakash	Saanchi's father
Sadanand Tiwari	Vijay Kumar	Indu's uncle, advocate
Abhay Tarachand Mathur		Saanchi's brother (Terminated)
Palakshi Tarachand Mathur	Digangana Suryavanshi	Saanchi's sister (Terminated)
Radha Sadanand Tiwari	Neena Singh	Sadanand's wife, Indu's aunt
Malti Devi Singh	Niilam Paanchal	Indu's mother, Sadanand's sister
Sushil Tiwari		Sandanand's brother
Anita Sushil Tiwari		Sushil's wife
Prabal Pratap Yadav	Zubin Dutt	Indu's enemy, student leader (in jail)
Shobha Sitaram Panda		Sitaram Panda's wife
Sitaram Panda	Sanjay Sugaonkar	Pandit
Abhimanyu Sitaram Panda	Vinay Rajput	Sitaram's son
Roopkumari Sitaram Panda		Sitaram's daughter
Shukla		Saanchi's university teacher (in jail)
Mehek	Paridhi Sharma	Saanchi's best friend
Rubina	Ishita Vyas	Sandanand's girlfriend

== Production ==
In March 2012, the shoot of the series was halted for a while when a leopard entered the sets of the series in Film City at Goregaon.

The series was initially reported to end in December 2012. However, it was later confirmed to end on last week of November 2012 and it ended on 23 November 2012.

== Reception ==
The Indian Express reviewed, "The story is interesting. The setting is not your usual badi havelis but a realistic background where characters speak authentic language of the region. The dialogues are crisp and refreshing. Credit goes to the producers Paresh Rawal and Hemal Thakkar, the writer and co-producer Kamal Pandey and director Santram Verma to put together a watchable show. The performances too are consistently good. Leading the pack is Pooja Sharma as Sanchi, who is raw but has an endearing quality. The story moves at a good pace and so far has been both engaging and entertaining. It's a great respite from mundane family dramas."
