= Baat Hamari Pakki Hai =

- Genre: Drama
- Written by: Sanjay Kumar; Anshuman Sinha; Satyam Tripathi; Radhika Borkar; Damini K Shetty; Mamta Alva
- Directed by: Prasad Gavandl
- Starring: See below
- Composer: Dony Hazarika
- Country of origin: India
- Original language: Hindi
- No. of seasons: 1
- No. of episodes: 188

Production
- Executive producers: Amarjeet Kaur; Gia Singh; Jashan Singh
- Producers: Tony Singh; Deeya Singh
- Editor: Mandar Khanvilkar
- Camera setup: Multi-camera
- Running time: approximately 24 minutes
- Production company: DJ's a Creative Unit

Original release
- Network: Sony Entertainment Television
- Release: 31 May 2010 – 25 February 2011

Baat Hamari Pakki Hai is an Indian television drama series which premiered on Sony Entertainment Television on 31 May 2010 and went off air on 25 February 2011.

== Plot ==
Baat Hamaari Pakki Hai is the story of Sanchi, an orphan who lives with her maternal uncle, Indar Sharma (who is a ghar jamai) and Indar's wife, Usha Sharma along with her younger cousins: Shreya, Nani and Nanu. Sanchi faces problems in finding a life partner and keeps getting rejected and Sanchi's marriage becomes the only agenda in Usha's life.

Each time a prospective groom arrives, Sanchi is displayed like a commodity and is often held responsible when the alliance does not work out. She goes through the humiliation of being displayed and then rejected time and again, until one day Sanchi meets her match: Shravan. Sanchi's wedding is fixed with Shravan, but this joy also proves to be short-lived as Sanchi realizes that Shravan loves someone else.

Shravan is shown to be lazy and irresponsible while Sanchi portrays a loving, mature and responsible young woman. The families of the protagonists attempt to solve the issues between the couple. Finally, Sanchi and Shravan get married and decide to make it a contract marriage where they will divorce after six months because Shravan loves Tara.

On their honeymoon, they get drunk and that night sleep together. Tara finds out and dumps him. Later they find out that, that night nothing happened between them. Shravan decides to patch up his relationship with Sanchi. All of the family members try to make Shravan fall for Sanchi. A long while later, Shravan realizes he is in love with Sanchi and confesses his love to her after a romantic session. Sanchi also confesses her love.

Shravan takes the marriage contract and attempts to burn it but realizes he grabbed the wrong paper. The marriage contract ends up in Shravan's father's hands and he is humiliated. However, now that Shravan and Sanchi truly love each other, they are determined to prove their love. Shravan's father makes them divorce and tells Shravan that if he can get ₹ 1 lakh in less than 30 days, he will prove himself responsible and that he truly loves Sanchi. Shravan heads out to find a job, but he is unsuccessful.

Shravan gets a job in a garage, working there trying to get 1 lakh. While working, he sees a poster about a race and the winner will get 1 lakh. Shravan enters the race and wins. Sanchi and Shravan go to receive the cheque for 1 lakh. They happily take it and drive away to start a new life. They later realize that it is not a 1 lakh cheque — instead, it's a cheque for ₹ 70,000.

Sanchi and Shravan start living in a marriage house, with the names Jack and Jerry. Later, they are accepted back into Shravan's family. But as fate had Sanchi meets with an accident, which erases her memory. In an attempt to get it back, the result becomes such that Sanchi gets her memory back but forgets everything after 24 hours, which means that each day, she will have to be reminded of her life and her loved ones. Shravan still loves Sanchi despite this condition and the story ends on a good note.

== Cast ==
=== Main ===
- Barun Sobti as Shravan Jaiswal. Madhura and Pratap youngest son- youngest brother of Saurabh, and Rajat. Husband of Sanchi.
- Ankita Sharma as Sanchi Shravan Jaiswal

=== Recurring ===
- Krystle D'Souza as Tara (Shravan's first love interest)
- Karan Wahi as Ranveer (Shravan’s rival)
- Nupur Joshi as Mandira
- Gaurav Gera as Pappu (Kashmira's brother)
- Kashmera Shah as Pappu's sister
- Vivek Mushran as Inder Sharma (Sanchi's uncle)
- Mona Ambegaonkar as Usha Inder Sharma (Sanchi's aunt)
- Susheel Parashar as Ramprasad Bharadwaj (Sanchi's Nanu)
- Himani Shivpuri as Nani
- Rohit Bhardwaj as Abhi (Sanchi's cousin-brother)
- Addite Shirwaikar as Preeti (Abhi's wife)
- Khyati Mangla as Shreya (Sanchi's cousin)
- Anokhi Shrivastav as Sharmila (Sanchi's cousin)
- Rishabh Shukla as Pratap Jaiswal- Husband of Madhura. Father of Shravan, Saurabh and Rajat.
- Rajlakshmi Solanki as Madhura Jaiswal-Wife of Pratap Jaiswal.Mother of Shravan, Saurabh, and Rajat.
- Sandeep Rajora as Saurabh Jaiswal-Pratap and Madhura eldest son - eldest brother of Shravan, and Rajat.Husband of Nidhi.
- Sai Deodhar as Nidhi Saurabh Jaiswal (Shravan's eldest sister-in-law)
- Ali Hassan as Rajat Jaiswal-Madhura and Pratap son- younger brother of Saurabh.elder brother of Shravan.Husband of Neeta.
- Mihika Verma as Neeta Rajat Jaiswal (Shravan's elder sister-in-law)
- Renuka Israni as Mrs. Jaiswal (Shravan's grandmother)
- Shaleen Bhanot as Rahul (Shravan’s rival)
- Gajendra Chauhan
- Jaya Bhattacharya
- Ragini Khanna
- Priyal Gor as Neelam.
- Jayati Bhatia
- Madhura Naik - Fraudster
- Nishant Shokeen
- Khushwant Walia
- Sahil Sharma as Bunty
- Aishwarya Sakhuja as Tanya (Toasty) Sharma
- Janvi Chheda as Tashi Singh

== Awards and nominations ==
Apsara Film & Television Producers Guild Awards 2011

- Nominated: Best Drama Series Fiction
- Nominated: Best TV Actor - Barun Sobti
