= Ichhapyaari Naagin =

- Genre: Drama; Comedy; Fantasy
- Directed by: Santram Varma; Rajan Waghdhare
- Starring: Priyal Gor; Mishkat Varma
- Country of origin: India
- Original language: Hindi
- No. of seasons: 1
- No. of episodes: 205

Production
- Producer: Siddharth P Malhotra
- Production locations: Mumbai, India
- Camera setup: Multi-camera
- Running time: Approx. 20 minutes
- Production company: Alchemy Films Pvt. Ltd.

Original release
- Network: SAB TV
- Release: 27 September 2016 – 10 July 2017

Ichhapyaari Naagin (transl. Beloved Desire-Serpent) is an Indian Hindi-language fantasy comedy television series aired on Sony SAB TV. The series premiered on 27 September 2016 and went off air on 10 July 2017.

== Plot ==
Ichhapyaari Naagin is set in a land called "Naagistan", where many Ichhadhaari Naags and Naagins live. They are nice and some hardly get vicious. One day while watching a TV show, they realize that humans have created a negative image in their minds about snakes and decide to come up with a way to change these perceptions about them. While Chirmiri plans to threaten humans, Ichha believes that perhaps, there might be a more peaceful way to go about with this and comes to earth to change their perceptions. She appears in a temple, before a pandit who worships snake deities and he tells her about the Pratap Family; a simple and loving Pehalwaan family. She befriends Appu who knows about her secret but problems arise when she falls in love with Babbal and must hide her true identity from him.

Meanwhile, Chirmiri who's jealous of Ichha attempts to sabotage her mission on various occasions but fails each time. On the other hand, Vishaili, an evil snake of "Vishailgarh", who lost one of her family members because of Daadi's son, Shankar, vows to kill each and every member of his family and has since kidnapped him and held him hostage to find about the whereabouts of his family. During the Diwali celebration, rivals from the neighbourhood place a bomb in the cracker box at the "Pratap House". Appu unknowingly lights the bomb thinking it's a firecracker and it explodes. Babbal saves Appu but gets severely injured and eventually breathes his last. To bring Babbal back to life, Ichha performs a puja called "Sanjhapratyarpan" where she gives half her life to Babbal.

Vishaili finally locates "Pratap House" and arrives as Amrita, a film maker to make a film on Pehelwaans. She claims to know Shankar and Daadi allows her to stay at their place. Vishaili finds out Ichha an Ichhadhaari Naagin is protecting the Pratap family and is determined to find the way to Naagistaan to destroy it as well. She then attacks the family with the help of Budhiraj, a shape shifting bee and then Aagvansh, a shape shifting fiery eagle but Ichha thwarts her every move. Ichha eventually finds out that Vishaili is the Vishailgarh naagin who was trying to destroy the Pehelwaan family then she threatens her that she is going to destroy the Pratap family and take her revenge from the family.

Babbal realizes his love for Ichha and tries professing his love on various occasions but she ignores him as she promised her mother to stay away from him. After many failed attempts, Babbal decides to make Ichha jealous by flirting with Amrita. Amrita falls for Babbal and it creates a rift between Iccha and Babbal. Prabal who can now read women's minds, mistakes Amrita to be in love with Babbal and informs Daadi who plans to get them married. However, Vishnaini, Vishaili 's sister and Queen of Vishailgarh allows this on the condition that Babbal be turned into a snake through a process called Naag-Atmikaran. Ichha interrupts the process causing Babbal to be hypnotised by Vishaili. Vishnaini arrives at Pratap House as Vishaili's mother to make sure everything goes according to their plan. Meanwhile, Ichha enters Vishailgarh and fetches a diamond which causes the Vishailgarh Sisters to take their snake form during Babbal and Vishaili's wedding and they escape soon afterward. Ichha finds out that she was born as a human and the former queen of Vishailgarh turned her into a naagin so Sipili and Sheshu had to save her. Ichha gets permission to marry Babbal and then she confesses her love to him. Ichha and Babbal finally get married after they defeat Vishali and Vishnaini.

Ichha had to defeat Sursuri a naagin who was jealous because Ichha married a human and who was creating trouble between Ichha and Babbal. Babbal eventually finds out that Ichha is a naagin but then eventually accepts her because she has saved his life during the Diwali incident. After the whole family finds out that Ichha is a naagin, Daadi get very furious and decides to kick her out of the house. Chanchal was very mad at Ichha but then Sipili tells her that Ichha saved her son from dying. Just before Ichha was leaving the house, Lord Shiva comes to the house and tells them that Ichha is a good naagin and she just came on Earth to change people's negative perception on snakes. The whole family then accepts Ichha with their perception about snakes being harmful changes and the series ends.

== Cast ==
=== Main cast ===
- Priyal Gor as Ichha (Naagin) / Ichha Babbal Pratap (Babbal's wife)
- Mishkat Varma as Babbal Khadak Pratap, Sabbal and Prabbal's brother (Ichha's husband)

=== Recurring cast ===
- Farida Dadi as Daadi Kaushalya Pratap (Prabbal, Sabbal, Babbal's grandmother)
- Badrul Islam as Khadak Pratap (Babbal's father)
- Sheela Sharma as Chanchal Khadak Pratap (Babbal's mother)
- Praveen Sirohi as Prabal Khadak Pratap (Babbal's first elder brother)
- Pooja Khatri as Mamta Prabal Pratap (Prabal's wife)
- Rakshit Pant as Sabal Khadak Pratap (Babbal's second elder brother)
- Sadhil Kapoor as Appu Prabal Pratap (Prabal and Mamta's son)
- Jiten Mukhi as Sheshu, Ichha's foster father (Naag)
- Anjali Gupta as Sipli, Ichha's foster mother (Naagin)
- Jazz Sodhi as Sursuri (Naagin)
- Agast Anand as Mukhya Ji, Naagistaan's Head (Naag)
- Sanatan Bajaj as Waku / Nagu (Naag)
- Hempushpak Arora as Guruji (Naag)
- Aakash Talwar as Mayuresh (shape-changing peacock)
- Amit Dolawat as Makraant (shape-changing spider)
- Reyhna Malhotra as Vishali / Amrita (Revengeful Naagin)
- Budhiraj (shape-changing bee)
- Aagvansh (shape-changing eagle)
- Rohini (evil shape-changing squirrel)
- Ella (shape changing squirrel)
- Sonia Singh as Vishnaini (Naagin)/ Vishaili's elder sister/ Queen of Vishailgarh
- Snehal Rai as Naagina (Sabal's ex-fiancé)
- Shivani Manchanda as Naaganjana Devi (a snake-charmer)
- Poorti Arya
- Ritesh Deshmukh in Special Appearance
