= Kaay Ghadla Tya Ratri? =

Indian Marathi-language crime series

- Genre: Thriller; Crime; Suspense
- Directed by: Paresh Patil
- Starring: See below
- Country of origin: India
- Original language: Marathi
- No. of episodes: 50

Production
- Producer: Sunil Bhosale
- Production locations: Mumbai, Maharashtra
- Camera setup: Multi-camera
- Running time: 45 minutes
- Production company: Someel Creations

Original release
- Network: Zee Marathi
- Release: 31 December 2020 – 23 April 2021

Kaay Ghadla Tya Ratri? is an Indian Marathi language Suspense, Crime and Thriller television series which aired on Zee Marathi. It premiered from 31 December 2020, replacing Dancing Queen. The show went abruptly off aired on 23 April 2021 without completing its story. It starred Manasi Salvi and Gaurav Ghatnekar in lead roles.

== Plot ==
Siddhant tells his friends that he is going to work in the upcoming movie of Kapoor films. At the event of Gopalkala, Siddhant speaks against Rajan Parvate. Kapoor's statement on the call shocks Siddhant. Siddhant worries as he has no money for his medical treatment. On Ajay's behest, Siddhant asks Sanjana for money. Sanjana agrees, but on the condition that he apologises to Rajan. While Shivani and Siddhant are partying with Ajay and Kuldeep, Siddhant gets in an argument with them. After that, Siddhant found murder. Inspector Wadkar reveals before journalists that Siddhant's death might be a murder. He interrogates Ajay and Kuldeep. Wadkar assures Pardeshi that he will solve Siddhant's case by tomorrow. Pardeshi chides Wadkar for having a press conference. Revati poses as journalist and interacts with Shivani as Sanjana and later, reveals true identity to Wadkar. A question asked by Revati leaves Sanjana stunned and Dhanraj tells Revati that he won't take Siddhant's body until justice is served. The journalists question about Siddhant enrage Chaya. Dhanraj, Ajay and Kuldeep makes allegations against Karina and search her house. Revati asks to handle the case with Wadkar. Dhavale tells Revati that Karina and her mother have fled. Then, Sanjana makes a plan with Karina and her mother against Revati that Revati forced Karina to accept that she murdered Siddhant Chhaya that night.

== Cast ==
=== Main ===
- Manasi Salvi as IPS Revati Borkar
- Gaurav Ghatnekar as Siddhant Dhanraj Bhalekar (Sid)

=== Recurring ===
- Smita Gondkar as Sanjana Raghav (Actress)
- Sushant Shelar as Ajay Deshmukh (Actor)
- Chetan Vadnere as Kuldeep More (Sid's friend)
- Jaywant Wadkar as Ramakant Dhavale (Sub-inspector)
- Kishor Kadam as Rajan Parvate (Politician)
- Vijay Nikam as Dhanraj Bhalekar (Sid's father)
- Rekha Bade as Chhaya Dhanraj Bhalekar (Sid's mother)
- Kajal Patil as Karina (Sid's maid)
- Sunny Bhushan as Dattatray Navangule (Dattu)
- Swapnil Dinkar as Rohan Nare (News Reporter)
- Swati Limaye as Shivani Desai (News Reporter)
- Dnayesh Wadekar as Shailesh Wadkar (Inspector)
- Shivraj Walvekar as Avinash Pardeshi (Police Commissioner)
- Apurva Choudhari as Laxmi (Lady Inspector)
- Sanjay Jadhav as Vishwajeet Chandra; Revati's husband (Advocate)
- Vandana Marathe as Chiu's caretaker
- Sakshi Paranjape as Minakshi Parvate (Rajan's wife)
- Aabha Velenkar as Karina's mother
- Shubham Sapre as Police Constable
- Mahesh Kulkarni as Divakar (Chhaya's brother)
