= Mrs. Pammi Pyarelal =

- Genre: Comedy
- Developed by: Prashant Bhatt
- Written by: Yunus Sajawal; Soham Abhiram; Sachin Singh; Sharad Tripathi; Sourabh Roy
- Directed by: Aashish Khurana
- Creative director: Namita Tiwari
- Presented by: Usha Nadkarni
- Starring: See below
- Theme music composer: Lalit Sen
- Opening theme: "Mrs. Pammi Pyarelal" by Abhijeet Hegdepatil KK
- Country of origin: India
- Original language: Hindi
- No. of seasons: 1
- No. of episodes: 72

Production
- Executive producers: Ashwini Sharma & Guddu Jha
- Producers: Paresh Rawal; Swaroop Sampat; Hemal Thakkar
- Production location: Mumbai
- Editor: Mandar Khanvilkar
- Camera setup: Multi-camera
- Running time: 24 minutes
- Production company: Playtime Creationn

Original release
- Network: Colors TV
- Release: 15 July – 5 October 2013

Mrs. Pammi Pyarelal is an Indian television comedy-drama series which premiered on Colors TV on 15 July 2013. The story centers around Pammi played by Gaurav Gera who cross-dresses as a woman. This show was last aired on 5 October 2013.

== Plot ==
Param comes to Mumbai to become an actor which is his dream. He plans to live with his childhood friend Rahul. Rahul gets kicked out of the house that he lived in, as he couldn't pay the rent to the landlord. Thereafter, the two are unsuccessful in finding a place to live until Param pretends to be Rahul's wife by dressing up as a girl. Both live in the Faujdar Villa together as tenants . However, they face a various problems. They always get out of them easily . In all these dramas, Pandey Ji becomes their Mama (Maternal Uncle ). Param falls for Minty and Rahul falls for Gayatri. They both struggle for their love and get them at the end.

== Cast ==
- Gaurav Gera as Param Gulati / Pammi Pyarelal - had to disguise as Pammi, Rahul's wife in order to get shelter at the Faujdar mansion. He falls in love with Minty at first sight
- Karan Godhwani as Rahul Pyarelal - helps Param disguise himself into Pammi and both pretend to play husband and wife in front of everyone. Later falls in love with Gayatri
- Dimple Jhangiani as Minty Param Gulati née Faujdar - becomes Pammi's best friend and later she finds out the truth and falls in love with Param. She is Gayatri's sister and Rajbir and Amrita's daughter
- Vindhya Tiwari as Gayatri Rahul Pyarelal née Faujdar - she becomes attracted to Rahul even though she thinks he's ‘married’ to Pammi. However, along with Minty she finds out the truth and her and Rahul fall in love
- Usha Nadkarni as Kamini Faujdar - the strict matriarch of the Faujdar family. Rajbir, Ranjit and Randhir's mother
- Sanjeev Jotangiya as Rajbir Faujdar - Gayatri and Minty's father
- Sonia Rakkar as Amrita Faujdar - Gayatri and Minty's mother
- Prasad Barve as Randhir Faujdar - Kamini's second son
- Rinku Ghosh as Mohini Faujdar - Randhir's wife
- Mazher Sayed as Ranjit Faujdar - he falls in love with Pammi even though she is actually a man
- Akshay Dogra as Sunny
