= Sati...Satya Ki Shakti =

- Directed by: Hemant Prabhu
- Starring: See below
- Country of origin: India
- Original language: Hindi
- No. of episodes: 115

Production
- Running time: approx. 25 minutes

Original release
- Network: Sahara One
- Release: 29 May – 3 November 2006

Sati - Satya Ki Shakti (transl. Sati - power of truth) is an Indian television soap opera that aired on Sahara One channel. The show premiered on 29 May 2006.

== Premise ==
The story is of a woman named Sati who stands and fights for her rights and those of many other women in the society. She is a lawyer who not only litigates and wins criminal cases on the show but who also answers actual questions from viewers and helps fight real-life cases. Sati's personal saga is also revealed: her vulnerability in trusting people too easily, her relationship with the man she loves, and her dry sense of humour.

== Cast ==
- Manasi Salvi as Advocate Sati Razdan
- Ayub Khan
- Sonia Kapoor as Sanika
- Kiran Bhargava as Urmila Arvind Razdan
- Rishina Kandhari as Anu Razdan
- Vineet Raina as Aarth Razdan
- Dimple Hirji as Smriti Thakur
- Dimple Inamdar as Advocate Priya Das
- Sandeep Rajora as Advocate Siddharth Raichand
- Hrishikesh Pandey
- Tarun Khanna
- Sanjay Mitra
- Karan Veer Mehra as Rajdeep Sikand
- Abhay Bhargava as Arvind Razdan
- Pallavi Subhash Chandran
