= Priyal Gor =

Indian television actress

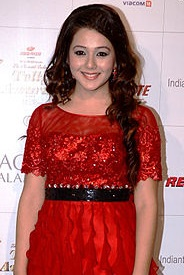
- Priyal Gor at Colors' Indian Telly Awards, 2012
- Born: Mumbai, Maharashtra, India
- Occupation: Actress
- Years active: 2010–present
- Known for: Icchapyari Naagin

Priyal Gor is an Indian television and film actress. She is known for starring as Iccha in the romantic fantasy drama Ichhapyaari Naagin.

== Personal life ==
Priyal Gor was born and brought up in Mumbai in a Gujarati family. She has a younger brother and an elder sister.

== Career ==
Gor's mother wanted her to become an actress. She started her acting career in 2010, when she got the lead female role in Ram Milaye Jodi. In the same year, through a friend she got a role in Disney Channel's Ishaan: Sapno Ko Awaaz De. Within 15 days of shooting for it she landed the lead female role of Mona in the Zee TV show Ram Milaye Jodi. At the age of seventeen Priyal got the role of Monia/Manyata in Dekha Ek Khwaab. She also had supporting roles in Baat Hamari Pakki Hai and Ammaji Ki Galli. Later she appeared in single episodes in Gumrah: End of Innocence, Yeh Hai Aashiqui MTV Webbed and Savdhaan India as well as a cameo in Like OK's Ek Boond Ishq. She has also participated in the Pakistani show Madventures. Besides she has appeared in various television and print advertisements, stating that they helped her gain more popularity.

In 2013, she made her feature film debut with the Punjabi romantic comedy Just U & Me in which she played an NRI named Geet. She is set to debut in Telugu in 2014 with Sasi Kiran Narayana's Saheba Subramanyam, which is the Telugu remake of the Malayalam film, Thattathin Marayathu. She played the female lead in the 2015 Malayalam film Anarkali opposite Prithviraj Sukumaran. She had also signed a Malayalam film God Bless You by Benjith Baby Mylaady. In 2018, she played the lead role of a lesbian in a web-series called Maaya 2. In June 2018, she joined the cast of Zee TV's soap opera Aap Ke Aa Jane Se as Chameli. In 2020, she appeared as Parvathy in Colors TV's show Naati Pinky Ki Lambi Love Story. In 2021, she portrayed Mamta in Sony Sab's show Tera Yaar Hoon Main.

== Filmography ==
=== Films ===
Year	Title	Role	Language
2013	Just U & Me	Geet	Punjabi
2014	Saheba Subramanyam	Saheba	Telugu
2015	Anarkali	Nadira Imam	Malayalam
2018	Chandamama Raave	Priya	Telugu
2021	Badnaam	Sonia	Hindi
2024	Maharaj	Leelavati	Hindi

=== Television ===
Year	Title	Role	Notes
2010	Ishaan: Sapno Ko Awaaz De	Tara	
2010	Ram Milaye Jodi	Mona Anukalp Gandhi	
2010–2011	Baat Hamari Pakki Hai	Neelam	
2011	Ammaji Ki Galli	Priyanka	
2011–2012	Dekha Ek Khwaab	Moniya/Yuvrani Rajkumari Manyata Kumari	
2012	Savdhaan India	Priyanka, Press Reporter, Episode 434	Episodic Role
2013	Yeh Hai Aashiqui	Mukti	Season 1; Episode 8
2013	Madventures	Contestant	
2014	Pyaar Tune Kya Kiya	Zohra	Season 1
2015	Adaalat	Utara	Season 1
2015	MTV Big F	Shruti	Season 1; Episode 1
2016	Chalti Ka Naam Gaadi...Let's Go	Roli	
2016–2017	Ichhapyaari Naagin	Ichha	
2017	Fear Files: Darr Ki Sacchi Tasvirein	Nikhat	Season 3
2018	Aap Ke Aa Jane Se	Chameli	9 episodes
2018	Laal Ishq	Sonia/Kajri	Episode 15/63
2020	Naati Pinky Ki Lambi Love Story	Parvathy	
2021	Tera Yaar Hoon Main	Mamta Jaiswal	

=== Web series ===
Year	Title	Role	Notes	Ref.
2018	Memories	Priya	13 episodes	
2019	Maaya	Simmi	Season 2	
2019	Love Bites	Shailja		
2019	Abhay	Divya		
2021	Qubool Hai 2.0	Aasma		
