= Hamari Betiyoon Ka Vivaah =

- Promotional logo
- Created by: Cinevistaas Limited
- Written by: Anshuman Sinha, Akashaditya Lama (Dialogues)
- Directed by: Krishan Sethi, Manesh Om Singhania
- Starring: see below
- Opening theme: "Vivaah" by Pamela Jain; Saveri & Ujjaini
- Country of origin: India
- Original language: Hindi
- No. of episodes: Total 205

Production
- Producers: Prem Kishen & Sunil Mehta
- Running time: approx. 23 minutes

Original release
- Network: Zee TV
- Release: 21 April 2008 – 20 February 2009

Hamari Betiyoon Ka Vivaah (English: Our Daughters' Wedding) is a Hindi television drama series that aired on Zee TV channel starting 21 April 2008 until 20 February 2009. The series has a Punjabi backdrop, and the story is about a mother's inherent anxiety about finding a suitable match for her daughters.

== Cast ==
- Raju Kher as Kulbhushan Kohli
- Himani Shivpuri as Kulraj Kulbhushan Kohli
- Sonali Suryavanshi as Sujata Kohli / Sujata Raghav Trivedi
- Pariva Pranati as Trishna Kohli / Trishna Rajdeep Malhotra
- Shalini Chandran as Tanya Kohli / Tanya Yuvraj Malhotra
- Roopal Tyagi as Manshaa Kohli
- Gautam Sharma as Raghav Trivedi
- Vikas Sethi / Sanjeet Bedi as Rajdeep Malhotra
- Omar Vani as Yuvraj / Raj Malhotra
- Jitendra Trehan as Mr. Trivedi
- Anju Mahendru as Nupur Malhotra
- Priya Ahuja as Sanjana Malhotra
- Hrishikesh Pandey as Shakti
- Kavita Rathod as Dimple
- Puneet Vashisht as Kanhaiya
- Nisha Sareen as Aarti Kapoor
