= Aur Pyaar Ho Gaya (TV series) =

Indian drama television series

- Genre: Drama; Romance
- Created by: Director's Kut Productions
- Written by: Sonali Jaffer; Dheeraj Sarna; Vibha Singh
- Directed by: Pradeep Gupta; Romesh Kalra
- Creative director: Tanya Mukherjee
- Starring: Kanchi Singh; Mishkat Varma; Reena Kapoor; Parichay Sharma; Mayur Mehta; Rajeev Singh
- Opening theme: Mohit Pathak; Sailesh Suvarna
- Country of origin: India
- Original language: Hindi
- No. of seasons: 1
- No. of episodes: 241

Production
- Producer: Rajan Shahi
- Editor: Sameer Gandhi
- Running time: 22 Minutes
- Production company: Director's Kut Productions

Original release
- Network: Zee TV
- Release: 6 January – 2 December 2014

Aur Pyaar Ho Gaya (English: And I Fell in Love) (International title: Love Oh Love) is an Indian television drama show, which premiered on 6 January 2014 on Zee TV and on Zee World as Love Oh Love on 14 August 2017. It stars Kanchi Singh and Mishkat Varma. The show is a coming of age story about two young people who have different notions about love. It was replaced by Satrangi Sasural in its timeslot.

== Plot ==
Avni, the daughter of Rajasthani business family Khandelwals falls in love with her father's assistant Raj. Akshat and Arpita are also in love. In past, Vikram and Bhawana (Sangeeta) were lovers. But, the Kapoors killed the Purohits except Vikram. This was a game by Virat to avenge Sangeeta for slapping him. To keep his secret, Virat kills Abhaas, but is jailed after he is exposed by Avni and Raj. The two families live happily.

== Cast ==
=== Main ===
- Mishkat Varma as Raj Purohit: Anjali and Vikram's son; Madhuri's Brother; Virat's Nephew; Arpita and Rakhi's brother Avni's husband
- Kanchi Singh as Avni Khandelwal Purohit: Sangeeta and Suket's daughter; Akshat and Abhaas's sister; Raj's wife
- Parichay Sharma as Abhaas Khandelwal: Sangeeta and Suket's younger son; Akshat and Avni's brother (Dead)

=== Recurring ===
- Reena Kapoor as Sangeeta "Bhavna" Kapoor Khandelwal: Vikram's former lover; Suket's wife; Akshat, Abhaas and Avni's mother
- Rajeev Singh as Suket Khandelwal: Sangeeta's husband; Akshat, Abhaas and Avni's father
- Rajeev Verma as Bauji : Suket and Savri's Father; Sangeeta's Father-in-law; Akshat, Abhaas and Avni's Grandfather
- Waseem Mushtaq as Akshat Khandelwal: Sangeeta and Suket's elder son; Abhaas and Avni's brother; Arpita's husband
- Niketa Agarwal as Arpita Khandelwal (née Agarwal):Akshat's wife and Raj's Rakhi sister
- Vinay Jain as Vikram Purohit: Sangeeta's former lover; Anjali's husband; Raj And Madhuri's father
- Rukhsar Rehman as Anjali Purohit: Vikram's wife; Raj and Madhuri's mother; Virat's Sister
- Bharat Chawda as Virat Kapoor: Anjali's brother; Raj and Madhuri's Maternal Uncle (Antagonist)
- Gunjan Khare as Madhuri Arora (née Purohit): Vikram And Anjali's Daughter; Raj's Sister; Jashan's Wife
- Anup Sharma as Jashan Singh Arora: Raj's Brother-In-Law, Madhuri's Husband
- Ashita Dhawan as Savri Pratap Singh: Suket's Sister; Akshat, Abhaas and Avni's Paternal Aunt
- Sailesh Gulabani as Siddharth Pratap Singh
- Naveen Saini as Satyaraj Chauhan
- Jaanvi Sangwan as Jahnvi Agarwal
- Navi Bhangu as Samarth
- Mayur Mehta as Amit
- Neelam Gandhi as Devika
- Manasi Salvi as Manasi
