= Manasi Salvi =

Indian television actress

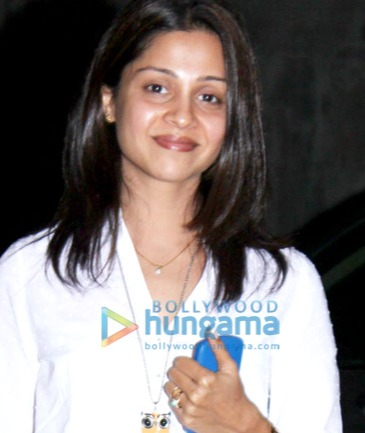
- Salvi in 2013
- Born: Manasi Salvi; Mumbai, Maharashtra, India
- Occupation: Actress
- Years active: 1996–present
- Known for: Aashirwad; Kohi Apna Sa; Awaz – Dil Se Dil Tak; Aakrosh; Sati...Satya Ki Shakti; Asambhav; Pyaar Ka Dard Hai Meetha Meetha Pyaara Pyaara; Doli Armaano Ki; Woh Apna Sa; Kaay Ghadla Tya Ratri?
- Height: 5 ft 6 in (1.68 m)
- Spouse: Hemant Prabhu (m. 2005; div. 2016)
- Children: Omisha Prabhu (daughter)

Manasi Salvi is an Indian television actress. She is best known for her roles in Aashirwad, Kohi Apna Sa, Awaz – Dil Se Dil Tak, Aakrosh, Sati...Satya Ki Shakti, Asambhav, Pyaar Ka Dard Hai Meetha Meetha Pyaara Pyaara, Doli Armaano Ki, Woh Apna Sa and Kaay Ghadla Tya Ratri?.

== Career ==
Salvi played the role of Avantika, Aditya's mother, in Star Plus's Pyaar Ka Dard Hai Meetha Meetha Pyaara Pyaara. She started her career on small screen with Zee TV's program Aashirwad which led to the role of Khushi, one of the three protagonists, in Ekta Kapoor's Kohi Apna Sa. In 2005, she appeared in the serial Saarrthi in which she played a character named Manasvi Goenka. That same year she made her film debut in a Marathi production produced by Lata Narvekar and directed by Gajendra Ahire.

== Early and personal life ==
In January 2005, Salvi married Hemant Prabhu, the director of the weekly drama Siddhant that aired on Star One. Prabhu also directed Salvi in the TV show Sati...Satya Ki Shakti.

In 2008, she gave a birth to their daughter Omisha Prabhu. In 2016, Manasi and Hemant got divorced.

== Filmography ==
=== Films ===
Year	Title	Role	Ref.
2006	Aai Shappath..!	Gargi Devki Desai	
2011	Sadarakshanaay	ACP Vidya Pandit	
2011	Khel Mandala	Sheetal	
2013	Asa Mee Ashi Tee	Rhea	

=== Television ===
Year	Show	Role	Notes
1996	Kahan Se Kahan Tak		
1998–2001	Aashirwad	Preeti Choudhary / Preeti Vijay Mansingha	
1999	Aahat	The Room Mate: Part 1 & 2	Episodic
1999	X Zone – Hairat	Kavita	Episodic
2000–2001	Kartavya	Padma	
2000	Aabhalmaya		
2001–2003	Kohi Apna Sa	Khushi Vishal Gill	
2003	Son Pari	Chulbuli 229	
2003–2004	Kucchh Pal Saath Tumhara		
2003–2004	Awaz - Dil Se Dil Tak	Sargam	
2004	Aakrosh	Suman Ahuja / Suman Abhay Mittal	
2004–2005	Prratima	Prema Ghosh	
2004–2006	Saarrthi	Manasvi Satya Goenka	
2006	Sati...Satya Ki Shakti	Advocate Sati Razdan	
2006	Viraasat	Gargi Kunal Kharbanda	
2007	Asambhav	Shubhra Adinath Shastri	
2006	Raavan	Mandodari	
2011	Pavitra Rishta	Aashna Digvijay Kirloskar	Cameo
2011–2012	Ekach Hya Janmi Janu	Shrikant's Ex-wife	
2012	SuperCops Vs Super Villains	Advocate Tanisha	
2012	Sapne Suhane Ladakpan Ke	Sneha Akash Kumar	Cameo
2012–2014	Pyaar Ka Dard Hai Meetha Meetha Pyaara Pyaara	Avantika Diwan / Avantika Harish Kumar	
2013	Hamara Hero Shaktimaan	Geeta Biswas	
2014	Aur Pyaar Ho Gaya	Manasi	Cameo
2015	Doli Armaano Ki	Urmi Ishaan Sinha	
2016	Bhaage Re Mann	Riya Raghav Vajpayee	
2016	Ishqbaaaz	Ketki Vikram Rana	Cameo
2017	Ek Aastha Aisi Bhee	Lakshmi Govind Agarwal	
2017–2018	Woh Apna Sa	Nisha Samar Shukla	
2018	Papa By Chance	Sucharita Samrat Chopra / Sucharita Harman Batra	
2020–2021	Kaay Ghadla Tya Ratri?	IPS Revati Borkar	
2021–2022	Balika Vadhu 2	Bhairavi Mehul Chaturvedi	
2023	Junooniyatt	Maheep "Mahi" Indarjeet Mehta	
2023–2025	Ghum Hai Kisikey Pyaar Meiin	Dr. Isha Shantanu Bhosle	
2026	Mahadev & Sons	Bhanupriya "Bhanu" Bajpai	
2026–present	Dilo Ki Ram Leela	Vijaya Sehgal	

== Awards ==
- Kalakar Award 2002 for Best Actress - Kohi Apna Sa
- Zee Gold Award 2013 for Best Supporting Actress - Pyaar Ka Dard Hai Meetha Meetha Pyaara Pyaara
- Zee Marathi Utsav Natyancha Awards 2020-21 for Best Performance of the Year - Kaay Ghadla Tya Ratri?
- Maharashtra state award for best actress for film Sadarakshanaay.
