= Kavya – Ek Jazbaa, Ek Junoon =

Indian drama television series

- Genre: Drama
- Written by: Malvika Asthana; Ritu Bhatia (Dialogue)
- Story by: Shabia Walia
- Directed by: Vikram Ghai; Rakesh Kumar (Current, 23rd Episode onwards)
- Starring: Sumbul Touqeer; Mishkat Varma
- Country of origin: India
- Original language: Hindi
- No. of seasons: 1
- No. of episodes: 264

Production
- Producers: Deeya Singh; Tony Singh
- Cinematography: Abhishek Singh; Dinesh Singh
- Editor: Jaskaran Dosanjh
- Camera setup: Multi camera
- Running time: 20-22 minutes
- Production company: DJ's a Creative Unit

Original release
- Network: Sony Entertainment Television (2023–2024); SonyLIV (2024)
- Release: 25 September 2023 – 26 September 2024

Kavya – Ek Jazbaa, Ek Junoon (transl. Kavya – A desire, A Passion) is an Indian Hindi-language drama television series that premiered on 25 September 2023 on Sony TV. Produced by Deeya Singh and Tony Singh under DJ's a Creative Unit, it stars Sumbul Touqeer and Mishkat Varma In September 2024, the series was moved exclusively to Sony LIV.

== Plot ==
The series narrates the life journey of Kavya, an IAS officer grappling with the challenges of maintaining a work-life balance while shouldering the immense responsibility of managing the country's affairs.

The plot unfolds with Kavya, an ordinary middle-class girl, enduring numerous hardships since her childhood with the untimely death of her sister. Witnessing her parents' struggles and the systemic issues faced by the voiceless masses, Kavya harbors a deep-seated determination to bring about change. Despite facing adversities, she aspires to become an IAS officer, driven by a desire to make a difference in society.

After overcoming numerous obstacles, Kavya achieves her dream of becoming an IAS officer. However, her personal life takes a hit when her fiancé Shubh fails the IAS exam and, unable to cope with his own insecurities, asks Kavya to choose between marriage and career. The breakup leaves Kavya devastated.

A turning point occurs in Kavya's life when Adhiraj, her former batch-mate from the IAS training academy, enters her life. The narrative explores how Kavya navigates the complexities of balancing her professional and personal life, all while handling the significant responsibilities associated with managing the country's affairs.

== Cast ==
=== Main ===
- Sumbul Touqeer as Kavya Pradhan: Rajeev and Anjali's daughter; Navya and Mayank's sister; Adhiraj's wife; Adhya's mother (2023–2024)
  - Sarah Killedar as child Kavya Bansal (2023)
- Mishkat Varma as Adhiraj "Adi" Pradhan: Giriraj and Malini's son; Omraj's brother; Kavya's husband; Adhya's father (2023–2024)

=== Recurring ===
- Chandresh Singh as Rajeev Bansal: Anjali's husband; Kavya, Navya and Mayank's father; Adhya's grandfather (2023–2024)
- Rudrakshi Gupta as Anjali Bansal: Rajeev's wife; Kavya, Navya and Mayank's mother; Adhya's grandmother (2023–2024)
- Neeva Malik as Navya Bansal: Rajeev and Anjali's daughter; Kavya and Mayank's sister (2023–2024)
- Varun Kasturia as Mayank Bansal: Rajeev and Anjali's son; Kavya and Navya's brother (2023–2024)
- Kiran Deep Sharma as Amma Ji: Giriraj's step-mother; Anurag's grandmother; Omraj and Adhiraj's step-grandmother; Omi and Adhya's step-great-grandmother (2024)
- Aamir Salim Khan as Anurag "Anu" Pradhan: Giriraj and Malini's step-nephew; Omraj and Adhiraj's step-cousin; Omi and Adhya's step-uncle (2024)
- Govind Pandey as Giriraj "Giri" Pradhan: Malini's husband; Omraj and Adhiraj's father; Omi and Adhya's grandfather (2023–2024)
- Asmita Sharma as Malini Pradhan: Giriraj's wife; Omraj and Adhiraj's mother; Omi and Adhya's grandmother (2023–2024)
  - Komal Chhabria replaced Asmita Sharma as Malini Pradhan (2024)
- Azad Ansari as Omraj "Omi" Pradhan: Giriraj and Malini's son; Alka's first husband; Omi's father (2023–2024)
- Akansha Sharma as Alka Verma: Omraj's widow; Sanjeev's wife; Omi's mother (2023–2024)
- Naman Ratan as Omi Pradhan: Omraj and Alka's son; Sanjeev's step-son (2024)
- Hemant Bharati as Sanjeev Verma: Alka's second husband; Omi's step-father (2023–2024)
- Vinay Jain as Jaydeep Thakur: An IAS officer; CAdTS course director; Gauri's husband; Shubham's father (2023)
- Gayatri Soham as Gauri Thakur: Jaydeep's wife; Shubham's mother (2023)
- Anuj Sullere as Shubham "Shubh" Thakur: Jaydeep and Gauri's son (2023–2024)
- Pankhuri Gidwani as IPS Anubha Mathur: Shubham's ex-fiancée; Adiraj's obsessive lover (2024)
- Himani Chawla as MLA Seema Chaudhary: actress turned politician (2024)
- Parakh Madan as Ms. Renu Sinha: Training Academy Incharge (2023)
- Kshitiz Kiran Punia as IAS Karan: Kavya and Adhiraj's friend from the Training Academy (2023)
- Nikhita Chopra as IAS Anusha: Kavya and Adhiraj's friend from the Training Academy (2023)
- Kritika Pande as IAS Payal: Kavya and Adhiraj's friend from the Training Academy (2023)
- Tanya Abrol as IAS Mrs. Chaddha: Kavya’s supervisor (2023–2024)
- Vivek Kumar as IAS Sangaram Singh: Kavya’s senior (2023)
- Oshi Sahu as Kajri: Kavya's helper (2023–2024)
- Mudit Nayar as Vikram "Vicky" Adityaraj Kaushal (2024)
- Khushi Misra as Radhika: Alka’s sister, Omkar’s sister-in-law; Adhiraj's ex-fiancé (2024)
- Ram Dev Mishra as Santoo: Pradhan family’s househelp (2024)
- Rohit Gill as bouncer (2024)

== Production ==
=== Development ===
The series was announced by Deeya Singh and Tony Singh under DJ's a Creative Unit for Sony Entertainment Television. It follows the life and struggle of a female IAS officer.

=== Casting ===
Sumbul Touqeer was cast as the lead, an IAS Officer Kavya Bansal. Mishkat Varma was cast as the lead, Adhiraj Pradhan. Anuj Sullere, another lead cast as Shubham, an IAS aspirant, marking his TV debut.

=== Filming ===
The series is set in Lucknow. Principal photography commenced from July 2023 and it is mainly shot at the Film City, Mumbai. Few initial portions were also shot in Lucknow, Kanpur and Delhi.

== Reception ==
Prachi Arya of India Today stated, "The show had a great start, ticking all the boxes, in terms of performance, engaging storyline and taut direction. Ditching the usual saas-bahu trope of daily soaps, Kavya is a respite for the viewers as it offers a compelling narrative about the protagonist as an IAS officer."

== See also ==
- List of programs broadcast by Sony Entertainment Television
