= Sumbul Touqeer =

Indian actress (born 2003)

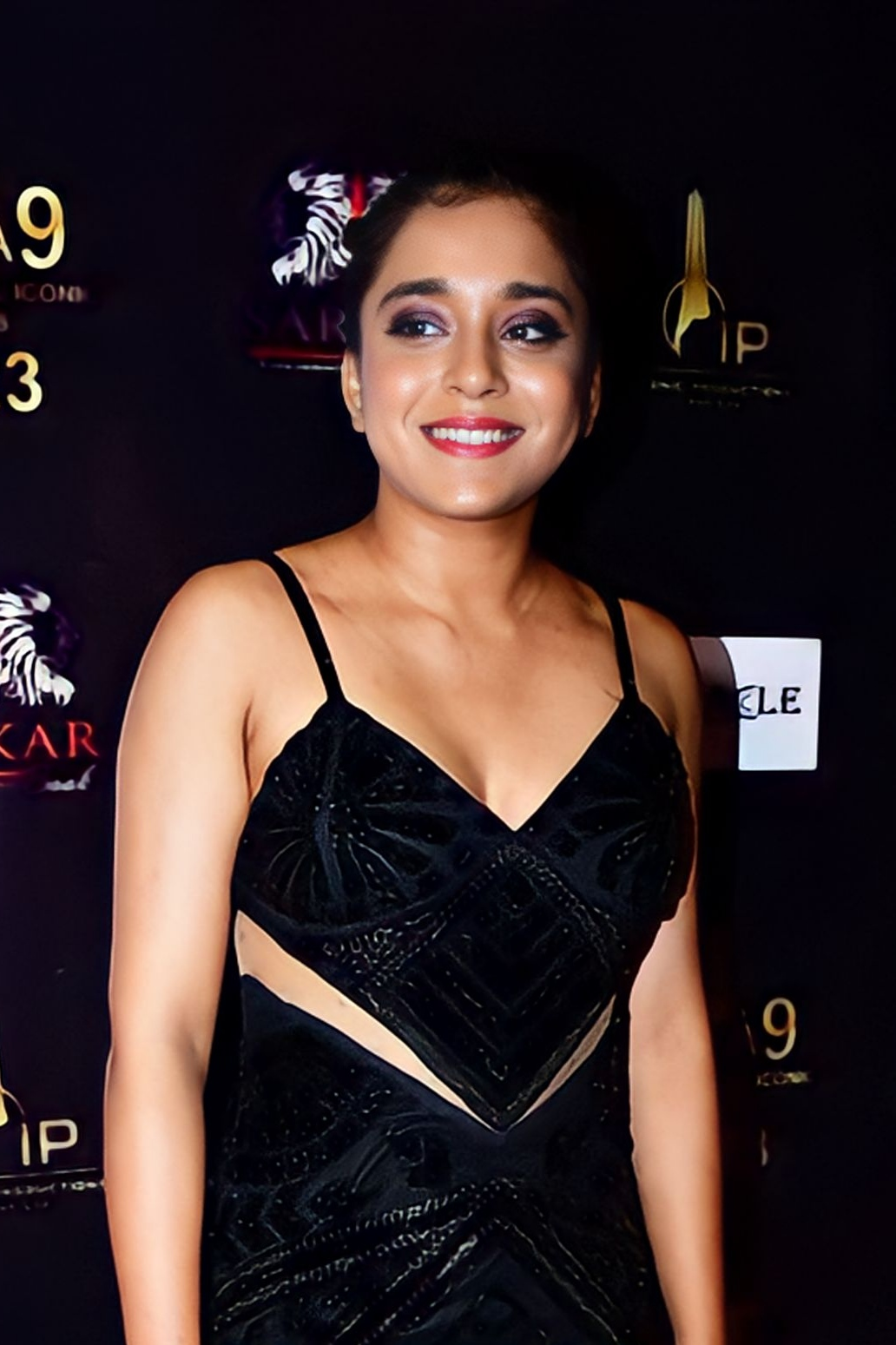
- Touqeer in 2023
- Born: 15 November 2003 (age 22); Shahjahanpur, Uttar Pradesh, India
- Occupations: Actress; Dancer
- Years active: 2013–present
- Known for: Imlie; Bigg Boss (Hindi season 16); Kavya – Ek Jazbaa, Ek Junoon
- Parent: Touqeer Hasan Khan (father)
- Relatives: Saniya Touqeer (sister)

Sumbul Touqeer (born 15 November 2003) is an Indian actress who primarily works in Hindi television. She is best known for her roles in Imlie and Kavya – Ek Jazbaa, Ek Junoon. She also has received a nomination for Indian Television Academy Award and Indian Telly Awards. In 2022, she participated in Bigg Boss 16.

== Early life ==
Sumbul Touqeer was born in Shahjahanpur, Uttar Pradesh and lived in Katni, Madhya Pradesh until she was six. At age six, her parents separated and her father Touqeer Hasan Khan brought Sumbul and her younger sister Saniya to Delhi, where they spent the next 5–6 years. Sumbul and Saniya were raised by their father as a single parent.

Sumbul completed high school at NTCC High School in Malad West, Mumbai and 12th standard from a private school.

Sumbul has trained as an actor with the Sehejmoodra Acting Academy.

== Career ==
She began her acting career with supporting roles as a child in Har Mushkil Ka Hal Akbar Birbal on Big Magic and Jodha Akbar on Zee TV in 2014. Sumbul participated in dance reality shows Hindustan Ka Big Star on Big Magic in 2014. From 2014 to 2016, she appeared in TV series such as Aahat, Gangaa, Baalveer, and Mann Mein Vishwaas Hai as a child artist. Between 2016 and 2019, she featured in series including Waaris, Chakradhari Ajay Krishna, Chandragupta Maurya, and Ishaaron Ishaaron Mein.

In 2019, she was cast in Hindi-language crime drama film Article 15 starring Ayushmann Khurrana, where she played the role of Amali. That same year, she appeared in the music video for the song "Vaaste."

In 2020, Touqeer achieved a turning point in her career when she was cast to play the roles of Imlie, a smart village girl in the StarPlus show Imlie, alongside Gashmeer Mahajani, Fahmaan Khan, and Mayuri Deshmukh. Her pairing with Khan was appreciated, for which they were nominated for Indian Telly Award for Best Onscreen Couple. In 2022, she participated in the game show Ravivaar With Star Parivaar as a contestant from Imlie. In the same year, she appeared in the music video "Ishq Ho Gaya" opposite Fahmaan Khan.

From 2022 to 2023, she participated in Colors TV's captive reality show Bigg Boss 16. She finished at the seventh place after spending 125 days in the house. Touqeer was the highest paid contestant of the season. In 2023, she took part in the game show Entertainment Ki Raat Housefull on Colors TV and appeared in the "Sazishen" music video.

She returned to television in the same year with Kavya – Ek Jazbaa, Ek Junoon on Sony Entertainment Television, playing the lead character of IAS Kavya Bansal, opposite Mishkat Varma.

== Media image ==
In 2026, she was listed in 30 Under 30 by the Indian edition of Variety.

== Filmography ==
=== Films ===
Year	Title	Role	Notes	Ref.
2018	Ghar Ki Jyoti	Jyoti	Short film	
2019	Article 15	Amali		
2026	Jhaad Phoonk			

=== Television ===
Year	Title	Role	Notes	Ref.
2013	India's Dancing Superstar	Contestant		
2014	Hindustan ka Big Star	Contestant		
2014	Har Mushkil Ka Hal Akbar Birbal	Aflatoon Bachchi		
2014	Jodha Akbar	Mehtab		
2015	Aahat	Swati / Ghost		
2015	Aastha - Atoot Vishwas Ki Kahani	Pinky		
2015	Gangaa	Neha		
2015	Baalveer	Gungun		
2016	Mann Mein Vishwaas Hai	Vidhi		
2016–2017	Waaris	Young Gunjan Pawania		
2017	Pyaar Tune Kya Kiya	Silky	Episode 31	
2017–2018	Chakradhari Ajay Krishna	Subhadra		
2018	Dil Hi Toh Hai	Tashu	Season 1	
2018	Chandragupta Maurya	Shubhada		
2019–2020	Ishaaron Ishaaron Mein	Khushi Srivastav		
2020–2022	Imlie	Imlie Chaturvedi Rathore		
2022	Ravivaar With Star Parivaar	Imlie / Contestant	Episode 1, 3–9, 12–16	
2022–2023	Bigg Boss 16	Herself	7th place	
2023	Dear Ishq	Sumbul Touqeer	Cameo appearance	
2023	Entertainment Ki Raat Housefull	Herself	Episode 1, 2, 8–12, 22, 23, 28, 30	
2023–2024	Kavya – Ek Jazbaa, Ek Junoon	IAS Kavya Bansal Pradhan		
2025	Jaadu Teri Nazar - Daayan Ka Mausam	Vedika	Cameo	
2025–2026	Itti Si Khushi	Anvita Diwekar Bhosale		

=== Music video appearances ===
Year	Title	Singer	Ref.
2019	Vaaste	Dhvani Bhanushali & Nikhil D'Souza	
2022	Ishq Ho Gaya	Tabish Pasha	
2023	Sazishen	Inaam	

== Awards and nominations ==
Year	Award	Category	Work	Result	Ref.
2023	Indian Telly Awards	Best Onscreen Couple	Imlie	Nominated	
2024	Indian Television Academy Awards	Best Actress (Popular)	Kavya – Ek Jazbaa, Ek Junoon	Nominated	
