= DJ's a Creative Unit =

Indian television production company

- Industry: Entertainment
- Founded: 1993
- Founder: Tony Singh & Deeya Singh
- Headquarters: Mumbai, India
- Products: Television series Web series
- Website: https://djsacreativeunit.com/

DJ's a Creative Unit is an Indian production company founded by Deeya Singh and Tony Singh. It has produced successful shows like Just Mohabbat, Left Right Left, Jassi Jaissi Koi Nahin, Parvarrish – Kuchh Khattee Kuchh Meethi, Mere Dad Ki Dulhan, Shaurya Aur Anokhi Ki Kahani and Kavya - Ek Jazbaa, Ek Junoon.

== Currently productions ==
- Sohni – Aur Nahi Koi Honi (2026)

== Past productions ==
Years	Show	Channel
1993–1997	Banegi Apni Baat	Zee TV
2006–2007	Jabb Love Hua	Zee TV
2008–2010	Chotti Bahu – Sindoor Bin Suhagan	Zee TV
2011–2012	Choti Bahu 2	Zee TV
2013–2014	Ek Mutthi Aasmaan	Zee TV
2015–2017	Kaala Teeka	Zee TV
1996–2000	Just Mohabbat	Sony Entertainment Television
2001–2002	Dil Se Dosti	Sony Entertainment Television
2003–2006	Jassi Jaissi Koi Nahin	Sony Entertainment Television
2009	Bhaskar Bharti	Sony Entertainment Television
2010–2011	Baat Hamari Pakki Hai	Sony Entertainment Television
2011–2013	Parvarrish – Kuchh Khattee Kuchh Meethi	Sony Entertainment Television
2015–2016	Parvarrish - Season 2	Sony Entertainment Television
2014–2015	Hum Hain Na	Sony Entertainment Television
2001	Love Main Kabhi Kabhi	SAB TV
2006–2008	Left Right Left	SAB TV
2008–2010	Jugni Chali Jalandhar	SAB TV
2012	I Luv My India	SAB TV
2015–2016	Police Factory	SAB TV
2007–2008	Annu Ki Ho Gayee Waah Bhai Waah	Star One
2008	Radhaa Ki Betiyaan Kuch Kar Dikhayengi	Imagine TV
2011–2012	Dharampatni	Imagine TV
2009	Mere Ghar Aayi Ek Nanhi Pari	Colors TV
2010	Aise Karo Naa Vidaa	Colors TV
2000–2001	Life Nahin Hai Ladoo	STAR Plus
2010–2012	Maryada: Lekin Kab Tak?	STAR Plus
2013–2014	Ek Nanad Ki Khushiyon Ki Chaabi...Meri Bhabhi	STAR Plus
2015–2016	Sumit Sambhal Lega	STAR Plus
2001–2002	Maan	Metro Gold
2007–2008	Jhoome Jiiya Re	Zee Next
2014–2015	Hamari Sister Didi	Sony Pal
2016	Life Ka Recharge	&TV
2017	Har Mard Ka Dard	Life OK
2018	Shaadi Jasoos	Discovery Jeet
2019–2020	Mere Dad Ki Dulhan	Sony TV
2019	Hum Tum And Them	ALT Balaji
2020–2021	Shaurya Aur Anokhi Ki Kahani	StarPlus
2023	Professor Pandey Ke Paanch Parivaar	Dangal 2
2023	Kavya - Ek Jazbaa, Ek Junoon	Sony Entertainment Television
