= Anju Mahendru =

Indian actress

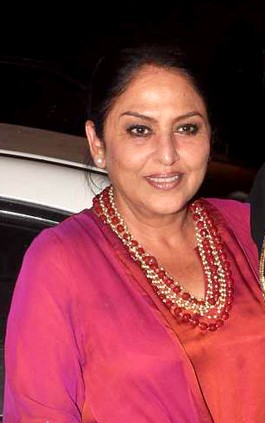
- Anju Mahendru in 2012
- Born: January 11, 1946 (age 80); Bombay, Bombay Presidency, British India (present-day Mumbai, Maharashtra, India)
- Occupations: Actress; Fashion designer
- Years active: 1966–present
- Partner(s): Imtiaz Khan (1972–1979); Rajesh Khanna (1967–1972); Garfield Sobers (1966–1967)
- Relatives: Madan Mohan (maternal uncle)

Anju Mahendru (born 11 January 1946) is an Indian actress and former fashion designer. She is best known as Kamini Gupta in Kasautii Zindagii Kay, Neelam in Kohi Apna Sa, Reeva in Kahiin to Hoga and Beeji in Ek Hazaaron Mein Meri Behna Hai.

== Personal life ==
Anju Mahendru's mother is the sister of the music director Madan Mohan.

Mahendru was briefly engaged to West Indies cricketer Garfield Sobers in 1967.

Mahendru and Rajesh Khanna met in 1966 and she dated him till 1972. Khanna later married Dimple Kapadia in March 1973. Mahendru and Rajesh did not speak with each other till 1987. Mahendru dated Imtiaz Khan from 1972 to 1979 but Anju broke off from Imtiaz in 1979.

Mahendru became friends again with Khanna from 1988 and Mahendru remained his close friend till Khanna's death and was by his side when he died. She confessed in an interview that it was because of her immaturity that she frivolously declined Khanna's offer of marriage to her in 1971 and had she accepted marriage she would have remained his wife.

== Career ==
Mahendru started modelling at the age of 13. She was discovered by poet and lyricist Kaifi Azmi who recommended her to Basu Bhattacharya. Basu cast her in Uski Kahani in 1966. Uski Kahani was the debut film for Mahendru as well as the first directorial venture of Basu Bhattacharya. She later went on to act in films such as Jewel Thief, Bandhan, Intaqam and Dastak. She never made it as a leading lady and moved to character roles. She was also featured in Nari Hira's television films featuring up and coming Aditya Pancholi in the mid-1980s.

She made a comeback in the 1990s in television acting in various soaps. She played Trishna's mother-in-law in the TV serial Hamari Betiyoon Ka Vivaah on Zee TV. She acted as Maan's daadi in Geet – Hui Sabse Parayi. She also played the role of Jeevika, Maanvi, and Daboo's daadi in Ek Hazaaron Mein Meri Behna Hai, of Sujatha in StarPlus' Yeh Hai Mohabbatein, and of Gayatri Singh, the grandmother of the female lead, Anami, in Rishton Ka Chakravyuh on StarPlus.

Other popular Hindi TV serials she acted in are Shingora (1986), Swabhimaan (1995), and Kasautii Zindagii Kay (2003).

== Filmography ==
Year	Film	Language	Role	Notes
1966	Uski Kahani	Hindi		
1967	Jewel Thief	Hindi	Neena	
1968	Sunghursh	Hindi	Kundan's sister	
1969	Bandhan	Hindi		
1969	Intaqam	Hindi	Indu	
1969	Road to Sikkim	Hindi		
1970	Dastak	Hindi		
1973	Hanste Zakhm	Hindi		
1974	Prem Shastra	Hindi	Barkha Arora	
1975	Umar Qaid	Hindi		
1977	Mukti	Hindi	Shanno	
1978	Darwaza	Hindi	Reshma	
1978	Ganga Ki Saugandh	Hindi	Courtesan	
1982	Pyaas	Hindi		
1982	Vakil Babu	Hindi	Shanti (Prem's ex-girlfriend)	
1987	Khatarnaak Irade	Hindi	Anita	
1988	Hum To Chale Pardes	Hindi		
1988	Khoon Bahaa Ganga Mein	Hindi		
1988	Vijay	Hindi	Bela	
1992	Insaaf Ki Devi	Hindi	Police Commissioner Geeta Mathur	
1992	Jaan Tere Naam	Hindi	Mrs. Ajay Malhotra	
1992	Muskurahat	Hindi	Mayadevi (Verma's sister)	
1993	Bomb Blast	Hindi		
1993	Dil Ki Baazi	Hindi	Lalita V. Kashyap	
1999	Muskaan	Hindi	Shama Khan (Sameer's mother)	
2001	A Pocket Full of Dreams	English	Asha	
2002	Saathiya	Hindi	Prema	
2002	Waah! Tera Kya Kehna	Hindi	Meena's mother	
2003	Satta	Hindi		
2003	Kyon?	Hindi	Sunidhi Narang	
2005	Page 3	Hindi	Ritu Bajaj	
2006	Humko Deewana Kar Gaye	Hindi		
2010	I Hate Luv Storys	Hindi	Jay's mother	
2011	The Dirty Picture	Hindi	Naila	

== Television ==
Year(s)	Title	Language	Role	Notes
1986	Shingora	Hindi		TV series
1994–1995	Kabhi Yeh Kabhi Woh	Hindi	Rajni	TV series
1995	Swabhimaan	Hindi	Ranjana Devi	TV series
1998	Sukanya	Hindi	Babli	TV series
1998	X Zone	Hindi		TV series
—	Aarohan	Hindi		TV series
2001–2003	Kohi Apna Sa	Hindi	Neelam Gill	TV series
2004	Kahiin to Hoga	Hindi	Reva Shergill (Sujal's stepmother)	TV series
2005–2006	Kasautii Zindagii Kay	Hindi	Kaamini Gupta	TV series
—	Ssshhh Koi Hai	Hindi	Strict hostel warden ghost	TV series
2010–2011	Geet – Hui Sabse Parayi	Hindi	Savitri Devi Khurana (Maan's grandmother)	TV series
2011–2013	Ek Hazaaron Mein Meri Behna Hai	Hindi	Beeji	TV series
2012–2013	Kuch Toh Log Kahenge	Hindi	Dr. Aradhana Bhardwaj	TV series
2013–2014	Do Dil Bandhe Ek Dori Se	Hindi	Renuka	TV series
2015	Yeh Hai Mohabbatein	Hindi	Sujata Kumar	TV series
2017	Rishton Ka Chakravyuh	Hindi	Gayatri Vikram Singh	TV series
2017	Soadies	Hindi		Web series
2018	Mariam Khan - Reporting Live	Hindi	Beeji	TV series
2019	Parchhayee	Hindi	Mrs. Ellen	Web series
2022	Appnapan – Badalte Rishton Ka Bandhan	Hindi		TV series
2024	Heeramandi	Hindi	Phoophi	Web series
