= Jhaad Phoonk =

Indian Hindi-language film

- Theatrical release poster
- Directed by: Rajan Ramgopal Verma
- Produced by: Shailesh Parihaar
- Starring: Sumbul Touqeer; Padmini Kolhapure; Harsh Rajput; Yashpal Sharma; Apratim Singh
- Production company: Niiv Entertainment India
- Distributed by: JioHotstar
- Release date: 30 October 2026
- Country: India
- Language: Hindi

Jhaad Phoonk (transl. Exorcism) is a 2026 Indian Hindi-language supernatural horror film directed by Rajan Ramgopal Verma and produced by Shailesh Parihaar. The film stars Sumbul Touqeer, Padmini Kolhapure, Harsh Jayesh Rajput, Yashpal Sharma and Apratim Singh. The film was originally scheduled for a theatrical release in India in late 2025 but was subsequently postponed. It is now scheduled for release on 30 October 2026.

== Plot ==
The film is described as a supernatural thriller exploring themes of the paranormal, spirituality, and fear, blending psychological and horror elements.

== Cast ==
- Sumbul Touqeer as Aastha
- Padmini Kolhapure
- Harsh Rajput as Rajveer
- Yashpal Sharma
- Apratim Singh

== Production ==
The film is directed by Rajan Ramgopal Verma and produced by Shailesh Parihaar, with Vrunda Brahmbhatt serving as co-producer. It is presented by Niiv Entertainment India Pvt. Ltd. The first look and teaser of the film were unveiled in August 2025.

== Release ==
Jhaad Phoonk is slated for theatrical release in India in late 2025 but was subsequently postponed. It is now scheduled for release on 30 October 2026.
