= Surbhi Tiwari =

Indian television actress (born 1980)

- Born: 19 October 1980 (age 45)
- Occupation: Actress
- Years active: 1995–present
- Known for: Shagun

Surbhi Tiwari (born 19 October 1980) is an Indian television actress. She is known for TV shows like Kahaani Ghar Ghar Kii, Shagun, Kumkum – Ek Pyara Sa Bandhan, Agle Janam Mohe Bitiya Hi Kijo and Yahaan Main Ghar Ghar Kheli. She was also cast in Tota Weds Maina, the role of Kanchan Kothari in Diya Aur Baati Hum and a cameo appearance in Do Dil Bandhe Ek Dori Se. She is heading for a divorce with her husband Praveen Kumar Sinha.

== Filmography ==
Year	Show	Role	Notes
1997	Ghar Jamai	College student	Guest
2000	Jap Tap Vratt	Devi Parvati	
2000	Shree Ganesh	Devi Sati	
2001–2003	Kahaani Ghar Ghar Kii	Shilpa Agarwal	
2001–2004	Shagun	Aradhana	
2001–2003	Shikwah	Shabnam	
2005	Kumkum – Ek Pyara Sa Bandhan	Abha Chauhan	
2006	Hari Mirchi Lal Mirchi	Rinku Khanna	Replacing Neeru Bajwa
2006–2007	Kulvaddhu	Sanyukta Singh Rathore	
2009	Agle Janam Mohe Bitiya Hi Kijo	Nandini Singh	
2009	Jhansi Ki Rani	Maina Bai	
2011	Diya Aur Baati Hum	Kanchan	
2011–2012	Yahaan Main Ghar Ghar Kheli	Pratibha Prasad	
2013	Do Dil Bandhe Ek Dori Se	Cameo	
2013	Tota Weds Maina	Pushpa	
2015	Hum Aapke Ghar Mein Rehte Hain	Sarla	
2016–2017	Ek Rishta Saajhedari Ka	Sarita Sethia	
2024	Chhota Bheem and the Curse of Damyaan	Tuntun Mausi	
