= Kaali – Ek Punar Avatar =

Indian soap opera

- Genre: Soap opera
- Written by: Kamal Pandey; Yogesh Vikrant
- Directed by: Dinesh Mahadev
- Creative director: Niraj Kumar Mishra
- Starring: See Below
- Opening theme: 'Sahaas Se Bada Koi Naa Hathiyaar'
- Country of origin: India
- No. of seasons: 1
- No. of episodes: 69

Production
- Producers: Shyamshish Bhattacharya; Nileema Bajpayee
- Cinematography: Rishi Sharma
- Editor: Afzal Sheikh
- Running time: 21 minutes
- Production company: Shakuntalam Telefilms

Original release
- Network: StarPlus
- Release: 3 December 2012 – 8 March 2013

Kaali – Ek Punar Avatar is an Indian soap opera which aired on StarPlus from 3 December 2012 to 8 March 2013. The story was based on the famous Nitish Katara murder case where a mother fights and gets justice for her son.

Before premiere, while under production, it was initially titled as Nyaay but was later renamed Kaali - Ek Punar Avatar.

== Overview ==
Sayali Tyagi falls in love with Nimai Bakshi, a middle-class man. But he gets killed by Sayali's father Rajan and brother Samar, as they don't want this alliance and fake his death as suicide. But Nimai's mother Vaani finds out the truth and seeks justice. She hires Inspector Devendra "Dev" Sandhu to protect her family. Sayali runs away. Lawyer Rajneesh Patak finds and takes her home. As Rajan finds out, he asks Rajneesh to fight his case but Dev finally with evidence arrests Rajan and Samar. Sayali and Rajneesh get married. Dev falls in love and starts a new life with Nimai's sister Paakhi.

== Cast ==
- Mangal Kenkre as Vaani: Nimai and Paakhi's mother
- Aneri Vajani as Paakhi: Nimai's sister, Dev's love interest
- Sonali Nikam as Sayali Tyagi/Sayali Patak: Rajan's daughter, Rajneesh's wife
- Arjun Bijlani as Dev: Paakhi's love interest
- Yashwant as Advocate Rajneesh Patak: Rajan's lawyer, Sayali's husband
- Anshul Trivedi as Nimai: Sayali's ex-lover (dead)
- Deepak Wadhwa as Samar Tyagi: Sayali's brother, Rajan's son, Nimai's murderer
- Sudhir Nimai as Rajan Tyagi: Sayali and Samar's father
- Ashutosh Tiwari

== Reception ==
The Indian Express stated, "The performances are decent with Sudhir Nimai's Tyagi leading the pack. He's certainly one of the most watchable villains television has produced so far, Mangal Kenkre makes Vaani Rajhans her own as she lends the role with the right amount of tenderness and toughness, and Anshul Trivedi as good boy Nimai is endearing. All we wish is that the story be tighter and the pace quickened."
