= Nisha Aur Uske Cousins =

- Genre: Coming of age; Romantic drama
- Created by: VM Badola
- Directed by: Rahib Siddiqui
- Starring: Aneri Vajani; Mishkat Varma
- Country of origin: India
- Original language: Hindi
- No. of seasons: 1
- No. of episodes: 268

Production
- Producer: Sukesh Motwani
- Production company: Bodhi Tree Productions

Original release
- Network: StarPlus
- Release: 18 August 2014 – 27 June 2015

Nisha Aur Uske Cousins (Nisha and Her Cousins) is an Indian Hindi-language coming of age romantic drama television series which aired on StarPlus from 18 August 2014 to 27 June 2015. It starred Aneri Vajani and Mishkat Varma. The story revolved around the relationship between seven cousins residing in the Jaipur city of Rajasthan and focused on the family disputes caused by the difference of opinions due to generation gaps.

== Plot ==
Set against the backdrop of Jaipur, it showcases the unconventional bond among seven cousins - Umesh, the oldest amongst the cousins whose passion is cooking; Dolly, a soon-to-be-married shopaholic and her fiancé Sumit; Kirti, a slightly narcissistic, self-involved fashionista; Nisha, a tomboy and a daredevil at heart; Suketu, an aspiring actor; Jwala, smart, painfully shy loveable geek; and Bunty, the youngest among all the cousins, and a typical mischief-maker, living in a joint family consisting of three brothers, their wives, Grandpa and Grandma.

Grandpa is a strict man who loves his grandchildren but believes in discipline and traditions. His ideals and mindset differ from the cousins' and the concept "Friends are forever, Cousins are for life!".

Despite their differing personalities, the cousins are linked together by a common thread of love and friendship and are each other's support system. Saurav, their childhood friend, is also a part of the cousins' gang.

The cousins sort through all the troubles that crop up during Dolly's wedding (that they themselves inevitably caused) and ensure she marries Sumit.

Umesh wants to open his own restaurant but is scared of his father who wants him to continue their family business. Suketu's dream of becoming an actor is not supported by Dadaji and he too is made to join the family business. Kirti breaks her relationship with her fiancé, Ritesh, after learning of his selfish motives. Jwala's tuition teacher tries to misbehave with her but she's saved by Nisha, which leads to the revelation that Nisha was a victim of child abuse when she was thirteen, after which she became a tomboy.

Nisha becomes inspired by Viraj Singh Rathore, a national level shooter and joins his Lakshya Academy as an office assistant. She writes mails to him in the name of Aarti to help him come out of his loneliness. Meanwhile, Umesh's girlfriend's - Amanpreet's father passes away, motivating Umesh to take a stand against his family and announce that he wants to marry Amanpreet, which is not received well by the elders who want Umesh to marry a Jain. Viraj and Amanpreet develop a brother-sister bond. After a few incidents, Umesh and Amanpreet marry with the family's consent.

The whole truth of Nisha being Aarti is presented in a bad way in front of media at a press conference by Viraj's bua Gayatri, abusing Viraj and Nisha's relationship. Viraj is left shattered.

After facing harsh words from Viraj, a heart-broken Nisha decides to go on a trip alone to discover herself where she meets Kabir (an artist who earns money from photography) who has come to Jaipur from Dubai in search of his brother, whom he has never met. While trying to save a little girl Chandu and themselves from the goons, both end up getting married accidentally and again marry unwillingly in front of Nisha's family due to Grandpa's insistence. They mutually agree on a contract marriage of three months after which Kabir would go to London, to fulfill his dream of becoming a world renowned dancer. Ramesh decides to follow his passion and opts out of the family business and starts his own music class.

Sumit gets jealous of the growing fondness of the family for Kabir and plots against him along with his mom and Rupan and traps him in a fake jewellery case. But while Nisha along with her cousins plans to clear Kabir's name while Nisha meets with an accident because of Sumit and is hospitalised and Kabir is imprisoned. After regaining conscious Nisha and her cousins along with Ramesh and Lakshmi proves Kabir's innocence and convict Sumit for his crimes. Kabir and Nisha realise they are in love with each other but do not confess. Meanwhile, Kaira reveals Gayatri's truth and Viraj realises his mistake of not trusting Nisha and also that he loves her and tries to get her back in his life.

Kabir's mom Vasundhara comes down to India and reprimands her son for lying to her about him being in London and hiding about his marriage. Though she accepts the marriage initially, she vows to separate them as she learns that Nisha is a Gangwal as she hates the Gangwals due to some past issues. It is then shown that Viraj and Kabir are brothers and Vasundhara had to leave Viraj when he was a child due to circumstances. She uses Viraj to create misunderstandings between Nisha and Kabir without knowing that Viraj is her son. Kabir thinks that Nisha is still in love with Viraj and decides to leave to London. Vasundhara gets to know that Viraj is her son, realises her mistake and asks Nisha to reunite the brothers. Viraj and Kabir reunite. Viraj realises that Nisha loves Kabir and decides to move on. Vasundhara apologizes to everyone and decides to be with Viraj. In the meantime, Dolly gets to know that she's pregnant but decides to raise her baby alone and applies for divorce from Sumit.

The story ends with Saurav and Dolly's love confession, Kabir proposing Nisha and their happy reunion with the cousins and the whole Gangwal family rejoicing and a flashback of all their happy moments is shown with the cousins theme song, Firdausiyana plays in the background.

== Cast ==
=== Main ===
- Aneri Vajani as Nisha Gangwal: Lakshmi and Ramesh's daughter, Suketu and Bunty's sister; Kabir's wife
- Mishkat Varma as Kabir Kumar: Vasundhara's son; Viraj's brother; Nisha's husband

=== Recurring ===
- Vishwamohan Badola as Nemichand Gangwal: Saroj's husband; Veerendra, Mohan and Ramesh's father; Dolly, Umesh, Nisha, Kirti, Suketu, Jwala and Bunty's grandfather
- Veena Mehta as Saroj Gangwal: Nemichand's wife; Veerendra, Mohan and Ramesh's mother; Dolly, Umesh, Nisha, Kirti, Suketu, Jwala and Bunty's grandmother
- Vivek Mushran as Ramesh Gangwal: Saroj and Nemichand's son; Lakshmi's husband; Nisha, Suketu and Bunty's father
- Pubali Sanyal as Lakshmi Gangwal: Ramesh's wife; Nisha, Suketu and Bunty's mother
- Taher Shabbir as Viraj Singh Rathore: Vasundhara's son; Kabir's brother; Nisha's former obsessive lover
- Khyaati Keswani as Vasundhara Kumar: Viraj and Kabir's mother
- Parv Kaila as Suketu Gangwal: Lakshmi and Ramesh's son; Umesh, Dolly, Kirti, and Nisha's younger brother; Jwala and Bunty's elder brother
- Nikunj Pandey as Bunty Gangwal: Lakshmi and Ramesh's son; Umesh, Dolly, Kirti, Nisha, Suketu, and Jwala's younger brother
- Purvi Mundada as Dolly Gangwal: Vimla and Veerendra's daughter; Umesh's younger sister; Kirti, Nisha, Suketu, Jwala, and Bunty's elder sister
- Meherzan Mazda as Umesh Gangwal: Vimla and Veerendra's son; Dolly, Kirti, Nisha, Suketu, Jwala, and Bunty's elder brother; Aman's husband
- Heli Daruwala as Kirti Gangwal: Rupan and Mohan's elder daughter; Umesh and Dolly's younger sister; Nisha, Suketu, Jwala, and Bunty's elder sister
- Barbie Jain as Jwala Gangwal: Rupan and Mohan's younger daughter; Umesh, Dolly, Kirti, Nisha, and Suketu's younger sister; Bunty's elder sister
- Vibhu K Raghave as Saurav Jain: Nisha's best friend and Dolly's love interest
- Priya Singh as Amanpreet Kaur: Umesh's wife
- Jayant Rawal as Veerendra Gangwal: Saroj and Nemichand's son; Vimla's husband; Dolly and Umesh's father
- Anjuman Saxena as Vimla Gangwal: Veerendra's wife; Dolly and Umesh's mother
- Jagat Rawat as Mohan Gangwal: Saroj and Nemichand's son; Rupan's husband; Kirti and Jwala's father
- Sonia Shah as Rupan Gangwal: Mohan's wife; Kirti and Jwala's mother
- Tuhina Vohra as Gayatri Singh Rathore: Priyanka's mother; Viraj's foster aunt
- Charu Vyas as Priyanka Singh Rathore: Gayatri's daughter
- Mohsin Khan as Ritesh: Kirti's former fiancé
- Rudra Kaushish as Ritesh's father
- Tarun Singh / Paaras Madaan as Sumit: Dolly's former husband
- Nisha Nagpal as Kaira: Viraj's friend
- Amit Sareen as Coach Shekhar

== Reception ==
Nisha Aur Uske Cousins initially received praise from critics and audiences alike for its fresh concept and youth-focused narrative and as a result saw high ratings.

As a part of the promotion, Star Plus introduced a free mobile app on 24 July which is World Cousins Day.

== Production ==
Because of his character's transition from good to bad, Taher Shabbir quit the show in June 2015 as he didn't like how his character was shaping up.
