= Kohi Apna Sa =

Indian drama television series

- Intertitle
- Created by: Balaji Telefilms
- Written by: R M Joshi; Anil Nagpal; Bharvi Shah
- Directed by: Qaeed Kuwajerwala; Rakesh Jaggi; Neelima Bajpayee
- Creative directors: Monisha Singh; Nivedita Basu; Ekta R Bahri
- Starring: see below
- Opening theme: "Kohi Apna Sa" 1 by Preeti & Pinky "Kohi Apna Sa" 2 by Priya Bhattacharya
- Country of origin: India
- Original language: Hindi
- No. of episodes: 312

Production
- Producers: Ekta Kapoor; Shobha Kapoor
- Cinematography: Anil Mishra
- Editor: Vikas Sharma
- Running time: approx. 24 minutes
- Production company: Balaji Telefilms

Original release
- Network: Zee TV
- Release: 15 October 2001 – 15 January 2003

Kohi Apna Sa is a Hindi drama television series. Shruti, Khushi and Sanjana are best friends and coincidentally all three get married in same family. The three friends live a happy life in each other's company, until tragedy strikes and Shruti's husband is murdered. The show started with good ratings on Zee TV and also became one of the most watched of channel but suddenly started losing viewership and went off air in January, 2003.

== Plot ==
Khushi, Shruti and Sanjana are the closest of friends who dote on each other. As luck would have it, they marry three cousins—Vishal, Tushar and Kabir, respectively—and start living in the same house. As they cope with the challenges of adjusting into a huge joint family, their friendship comes under pressure; but they always try to support each other.

Their lives take an unexpected tragic turn when Tushar is murdered and his wife Shruti is arrested for the crime. Though Shruti protests that she is innocent, she is taken away by the police. Khushi and Sanjana watch helplessly, while the other family members condemn Shruti. Later, they are told that a police van carrying Shruti has met with an accident, killing her along with the other occupants.

Several years later, a successful businesswoman named Mallika Singhania comes in contact with Khushi, Sanjana and their husbands. Friendly at first, Mallika later unveils a ruthless plan for ruining Vishal and Kabir. When Khushi and Sanjana confront Mallika, they make a shocking discovery. Mallika is none other than Shruti, who survived the accident, but underwent plastic surgery to fix her ruined face. With the support of a wealthy and generous old lady, Shruti has built up a new identity as Mallika. She believes that Vishal and Kabir have killed Tushar and implicated her, so she is seeking revenge from them. She is also angry with Khushi and Sanjana for having abandoned her.

Mallika gets Vishal and Kabir arrested. But new evidence appears revealing someone else was the murderer. The identity of the murderer turns out to be Roshni, along with the motive for murder, is disclosed only at the end and leaves everybody flabbergasted. It is revealed that she killed Tushar in order to marry his brother Rahul.

== Cast ==
- Manasi Salvi as Khushi Vishal Gill
- Narayani Shastri as Shruti Tushar Gill (before plastic surgery)
- Smita Bansal as Shruti Tushar Gill (after plastic surgery) / Mallika Singhania
- Sherrin Varghese / Akhil Ghai as Tushar Rajan Gill
- Hrishikesh Pandey as Vishal Raman Gill
- Aparna Tilak as Sanjana Kabir Gill
- Puneet Vashisht as Kabir Vikram Gill
- Vikas Bhalla as Aditya
- Aashish Kaul as Sameer
- Madan Joshi as Mr. Gill (grandfather Of Vishal, Tushar and Kabir)
- Anju Mahendru as Neelam Raman Gill (Vishal's mother)
- Neelam Mehra as Sheetal Vikram Gill (Kabir's mother)
- Daman Mann as Raman Gill (Vishal's father)
- Uday Tikekar as Vikram Gill Kabir's father
- Madhavi Gogate as Raksha Rajan Gill (Tushar's mother)
- Mukesh Rawal as Rajan Gill (Tushar's father)
- Kishori Shahane as Vimala: Khushi's mother
- Kanika Shivpuri as Shruti's aunt
- Susheel Parashar as Sanjana's father
- Manorama as Sarala Bua
- Prabhat Bhattacharya as Rahul Rajan Gill
- Vaishali Saini as Roshni Mehra / Roshni Rahul Gill
- Meenakshi Gupta as Priya Rahul Gill
- Smita Singh as Urvashi Gill: Deepika, Tushar and Nachiket's younger sister
- Gaurav Gera as Akash
- Gunn Kansara / Kavita Kaushik as Rachana Gill: Raman's daughter
- Mehul Kajaria as Nachiket Gill: Deepika and Tushar's younger brother; Urvashi's elder brother
- Shabnam Sayed as Deepika Gill (Tushar's eldest sister)
- Sagarika Soni as Niharika Gill (Vishal's eldest sister)
- Amrita Prakash as Komal Gill / Kavita
  - Chandni Bhagwanani as Child Komal
- Kali Prasad Mukherjee as CBI Inspector Rane
- Surendra Pal as Umesh Mehra : Roshni's father
- Roopa Divetia as Sharada Umesh Mehra: Roshni's mother
- Gargi Patel as Gayatri Singhania
- Manish Khanna
- Vijay Bhatia as Aashish

== Reception ==
The show had redefine Indian Television in 2002 as the show was completely different from its sister shows produced under same production house Balaji Telefilms. The show don't had loud music and heavy VFX. The show had high emotional content and the characters were relevant to housewives. The character of Khushi Gill played by Manasi Salvi had many related qualities with Indian house wives as she was full of emotions and took decisions by heart not by brain. The show had a reality element while showing the friendship bond. The character of Sanjana played by Aparna Tilak was showcased as an over-confident and smart girl mixture that seems very real. The characters were neither shown in heavy saris and bindis nor was there any over-the-top drama. The bonding showed among the three friends was appreciable as it was the main focus of the show. The show had good TRPs and viewership unless the complete focus of story didn't shifted to Shruti and Tushar. The show was introduced as a story of three friends and their strong bonding even under hard circumstances but suddenly the complete focus was shifted to Shruti's life and show started losing viewership. A twist introduced of Tushar's murder and show again continued its smooth ride until the story reached more than 150 episodes, after which ratings declined and the show was cancelled.

=== Awards ===
Won

- Manasi Salvi won Best Actress at 10th Kalakar Awards in the year 2002.
- Rekhha Modi won Best Dialogue Writer at 1st Indian Telly Awards in the year 2002.
- The Show won Best New Serial at 1st Indian Telly Awards in the year 2002.
- The Show won Best Serial at 11th Kalakar Awards in the year 2003.

Nominated

- Manasi Salvi nominated for Best Actress at 1st Indian Telly Awards 2002.
- The Show nominated for Best Drama Series at 1st Indian Telly Awards 2002.
- The Show nominated for Best Daily Serial at 1st Indian Telly Awards 2002.
- Preeti & Pinky nominated for Best Playback Singer at 1st Indian Telly Awards 2002.
- Aparna Tilak nominated for Best Actress in Comic Role at 1st Indian Telly Awards 2002.
- Aparna Tilak and Puneet Vasishtha nominated for Best Jodi at 1st Indian Telly Awards 2002.
- The Show nominated for Best Drama Serial at 2nd ITA Awards 2002
