= Harsh Rajput =

Indian actor

- Occupation: Actor
- Years active: 2006–present
- Known for: Nazar

Harsh Rajput is an Indian television actor best known for playing Ansh Rathod in Nazar.

== Early life ==
Rajput hails from Navsari. He faced a hard time when he came to Mumbai. He had language problem and was difficult for him to adopt to that culture. Slowly, he adapted. He has a younger brother.

== Career ==
He made his television debut with Dharti Ka Veer Yodha Prithviraj Chauhan on StarPlus. He also starred in shows like Dharm Veer, Hitler Didi and Crazy Stupid Ishq where he landed his first lead role. Harsh has also acted in several episodic shows such as Pyaar Tune Kya Kiya and Yeh Hai Aashiqui. He also played a role in Most Popular Serial Saath Nibhaana Saathiya. He was seen playing the lead role of Ansh Rathod in StarPlus' supernatural show Nazar, produced by 4 Lions Films and opposite with Niyati Fatnani. He then played the lead role in Colors TV's show Kuch Toh Hai: Naagin Ek Naye Rang Mein which is a spin-off to the Naagin 5.

From 2022 to 2023, he played the role of Rakshit "Rocky" in the Colors TV show Pishachini. Since September 2023, Rajput appeared in StarPlus' Teri Meri Doriyaann where he portrayed Rumi.

== Filmography ==
=== Films ===
Year	Title	Role	Notes
2012	Aalaap	Brijesh	
2014	Traces of Sandalwood	Young Sanjay	
2026	Jhaad Phoonk		

=== Television ===
Year	Title	Role	Ref(s).
2006	Dharti Ka Veer Yodha Prithviraj Chauhan	Pundir	
2008	Dharam Veer	Agni	
2013	Hitler Didi	Ishaan Sharma	
2013	The Buddy Project	Ishaan	
2013	Crazy Stupid Ishq	Ishaan Dixit	
2014–2015	Sapne Suhane Ladakpan Ke	Bittu Tripathi	
2015	Yeh Hai Aashiqui	Kush	
2015–2016	Janbaaz Sindbad	Sindbad	
2016	Saath Nibhaana Saathiya	Prakash	
2018–2020	Nazar	Ansh Rathod	
2021	Kuch Toh Hai: Naagin Ek Naye Rang Mein	Rehaan Singhania	
2021	Ankahee Dastaan	Ansh Rathod	
2022–2023	Pishachini	Rakshit Rajput	
2023	Teri Meri Doriyaann	Rumi Baweja	

==== Special appearances ====
Year	Title	Role	Notes	Ref(s).
2015	Aahat		Episodic Role	
2021	Bigg Boss 14	Rehaan Singhania	Guest	
2022	Saavi Ki Savaari - Ganesh Utsav	Rocky	Guest	

=== Web series ===
Year	Title	Role	Ref.
2024	Dil Dosti Drama	Raunak	
