= Crazy Stupid Ishq =

Indian youth-based drama

- Starring: Hiba Nawab; Aneri Vajani; Vishal Vashishtha; Harsh Rajput
- Country of origin: India
- Original language: Hindi
- No. of seasons: 1

Production
- Running time: 24 minutes

Original release
- Network: Channel V India
- Release: 27 May – 22 November 2013

Crazy Stupid Ishq is an Indian television youth drama show which premiered on 27 May 2013 on Channel V India. Produced by Sphere Origins, it starred Hiba Nawab, Aneri Vajani, Harsh Rajput and Vishal Vashishtha.

== Cast ==
=== Main ===
- Vishal Vashishtha as Ayaan Dixit
- Hiba Nawab as Anushka "Pampi" Atwal
- Harsh Rajput as Ishaan Dixit
- Aneri Vajani as Shanaya Khan

=== Recurring ===
- Kishwar Merchant as Jasmine Atwal: Anushka's mother
- Shivani Tomar as Meenal Kashyap: Ayaan's girlfriend
- Alihassan Turabi as Neelazeem Khan: Shanaya's father
