= Mishkat Varma =

Indian television actor (born 1989)

- Born: 17 November 1989 (age 36); Delhi, India
- Occupations: Actor; model
- Years active: 2014–present
- Television: Nisha Aur Uske Cousins; Aur Pyaar Ho Gaya; Ichhapyaari Naagin; Anandibaa Aur Emily; Kavya – Ek Jazbaa, Ek Junoon
- Relatives: Mihika Verma (sister)

Mishkat Varma (born 17 November 1989) is an Indian television actor known for playing Kabir Kumar in Nisha Aur Uske Cousins and Adhiraj Pradhan in Kavya – Ek Jazbaa, Ek Junoon.

== Early life and family ==
Varma was born to a Punjabi father, Dilip Varma and South-Indian mother, Uma Varma. He did his schooling from Bombay Scottish School, Mahim and attended Mithibai College. He is a trained dancer and was a part of Shiamak Davar's dancing troupe. His elder sister, Mihika Verma is also an actress.

== Career ==
Varma started his career by modelling and appearing in various advertisements. He made his television debut in 2014 with Aur Pyaar Ho Gaya as Raj Purohit. He was nominated for Fresh New Face Male in Indian Telly Awards.

From 2014 to 2015, he portrayed Kabir Kumar in Nisha Aur Uske Cousins opposite Aneri Vajani. His performance earned him a nomination for Male Actor Of The Year in Asian Viewers Television Awards 2015.

In 2016, he played Josy Nair in Bindass's Yeh Hai Aashiqui which reunited him with Vajani. From 2016 to 2017, he portrayed Babbal Pratap in SAB TV's Ichhapyaari Naagin.

In 2018, he played Shaurya Saxena in &TV's anthology series Laal Ishq. In 2019, Varma portrayed Viraat in &TV's Shaadi Ke Siyape. From 2019 to 2020, Varma played Shikhar Shergill in Star Plus's Divya Drishti opposite Nyra Banerjee.

In 2022, Varma played Aarav Sanghani in Anandibaa Aur Emily.

From 2023 to 2024, he played the lead Adhiraj Pradhan in Kavya – Ek Jazbaa, Ek Junoon opposite Sumbul Touqeer Khan, which earned him his first Indian Television Academy Awards nomination for Best Actor Popular.

From January 2025 to July 2025, he's portraying Om Vajpayee in Colors TV's Ram Bhavan opposite Khushbu Rajendra and Samiksha Jaiswal.

== Filmography ==
Year	Film	Role	Notes	Ref.
2019	Rishtey Mein Toh Hum Tumhare	Nirmal Khurana	Short film	

=== Television ===
Year	Serial	Role	Notes	Ref.
2014	Aur Pyaar Ho Gaya	Raj Purohit	Lead Role	
2014–2015	Nisha Aur Uske Cousins	Kabir Kumar	Lead Role	
2016	Yeh Hai Aashiqui	Josy Nair	Episode: "Secret Marriage"	
2016–2017	Ichhapyaari Naagin	Babbal Pratap	Lead Role	
2018	Laal Ishq	Shaurya Saxena	Episode: "Kundali"	
2019	Shaadi Ke Siyape	Viraat	Lead Role	
2019–2020	Divya Drishti	Shikhar Shergill	Lead Role	
2022	Anandibaa Aur Emily	Aarav Sanghani	Lead Role	
2023–2024	Kavya – Ek Jazbaa, Ek Junoon	Adhiraj "Adi" Pradhan	Lead Role	
2025	Ram Bhavan	Om Ramdas Vajpayee	Lead Role	
2026–present	Dilo Ki Ram Leela	Ram Kumar	Lead Role	

=== Web series ===
Year	Title	Role	Ref.
2016	I Don't Watch TV	Himself	
2026	Tu Yaa Koi Nahi	Yash/Ansh	

== Awards and nominations ==
Year	Award	Category	Show	Result	Reference
2014	Indian Telly Awards	Fresh New Face (Male)	Aur Pyaar Ho Gaya	Nominated	
2015	Asian Viewers Television Awards	Male Actor Of The Year	Nisha Aur Uske Cousins	Nominated	
2024	24th Indian Television Academy Awards	Best Actor Popular Drama	Kavya – Ek Jazbaa, Ek Junoon	Nominated	
