= 2017 in Indian television =

List of years in Indian television
- … 2007; 2008; 2009; 2010; 2011; 2012; 2013; 2014; 2015; 2016; 2017; 2018; 2019; 2020; 2021; 2022; 2023; 2024; 2025; 2026; 2027 …
- Art; Archaeology; Architecture; Literature; Music; Philosophy; Science; +...

The following is a list of events affecting 2017 in Indian television.

== Television series debuts ==
- Aisi Deewangi Dekhi Nahi Kahi
- Sethji (TV series)
- Sthreepadham
- Tu Aashiqui
- Vanambadi (TV series)

== Television series endings ==
- Agar Tum Saath Ho
- Ammuvinte Amma
- Ardhangini (2017 TV series)

== Television seasons ==
- Dance Champions
- Partners Trouble Ho Gayi Double
- Pushpavalli (TV series)
- Har Mard Ka Dard
