= List of programmes broadcast by Big Magic =

As of 2023, this is the list of current, former series broadcast by the Hindi entertainment channel Big Magic.

== Former programming ==
=== Original programming ===
Comedy series

Year	Show
2014-2016	Akbar Birbal
2015-2017	Actor Calling Actor
2015	Boyz
2015	Chutki Baja Ke
2015-2016	Fakebook with Kavita
2015	Ji Sirji!
2015-2016	Lete Hain Khabar Khabro Ki with Varun Badola
2013-2015	Mahisagar
2015-2016	Nautanki News
2013-2017	Nadaniyaan
2015	Narayan Narayan
2016	Naya Mahisagar

- Naya Akbar Birbal
- Pyar Marriage Shhhh (PMS)
- Tedi Medi Family
- Tera Baap Mera Baap

=== Drama and live action series ===
- Akbar – Rakht Se Takht Ka Safar
- Bal Gopal Kare Dhamaal
- Beta Hi Chahiye
- Hum Paanch Phir Se
- Jai Maa Vindhyavasini
- Khullja Sim Sim Season 3
- Pyar Ya Dehshat
- Raavi
- Rudra Ke Rakshak
- Har Mushkil Ka Hal Akbar Birbal

=== Horror/supernatural series ===
- Cheekh..Ek Khauffnakk Sach

=== Mythological series ===
- Baal Krishna
- Chakradhari Ajay Krishna
- Jai Maa Vindhyavasini
- Maa Shakti (2017)
- Shaktipeeth Ke Bhairav (2017)

=== Reality shows ===
- BIG Fame Star
- BIG Memsaab
- Bollywood Frydays
- Chef Vs Fridge
- Chutki Shopkeepaa Aur Woh
- Family Fortunes
- Khullja Sim Sim
- India's Best Dramebaaz

=== Comedy series ===
- Bhutu
- Bh Se Bhade
- Neeli Chatri Waale
- Happu ki Ultan Paltan

=== Drama ===
- Afsar Bitiya
- Badho Bahu
- Gangaa
- Chhoti Bahu 2
- Shorveer Sisters
- Shaka Laka Boom Boom
- Sonpari
- Supergirl
- Yeh Kahan Aa Gaye Hum

=== Horror/supernatural series ===
- Brahmarakshas
- Fear Files
- Hatim
- Maharakshak: Devi
- Maharakshak Aryan
- Naaginn – Waadon Ki Agniparikshaa

=== Mythological series ===
- Buddha
- Mahabharat
- Paramavatar Shri Krishna
- Jai Jai Jai Bajrang Bali
- Ramayan
- Santoshi Maa
- Vikram Betaal Ki Rahasya Gatha
- Kripa Maa Lakshami Maa Ki

=== Reality/non-scripted programming ===
- Dance India Dance Li'l Masters
- India's Best Dramebaaz
- Sa Re Ga Ma Pa Li'l Champs 2017
