= 2016 in Indian television =

List of years in Indian television
- … 2006; 2007; 2008; 2009; 2010; 2011; 2012; 2013; 2014; 2015; 2016; 2017; 2018; 2019; 2020; 2021; 2022; 2023; 2024; 2025; 2026 …
- Art; Archaeology; Architecture; Literature; Music; Philosophy; Science; +...

The following is a list of events affecting 2016 in Indian television.

== Television series debuts ==
- Aamar Durga
- Agar Tum Saath Ho

== Television series endings ==
- Aaj Ki Raat Hai Zindagi

== Television seasons ==
- 24 (Indian TV series)
- Adaalat (season 2)
- Bigg Boss 10
- Bigg Boss Kannada 3
- Dance Plus (season 2)
- Fear Factor: Khatron Ke Khiladi 7
- India's Got Talent (season 7)
- India's Next Top Model (cycle 2)
- Jhalak Dikhhla Jaa (season 9)
- MasterChef India Season 5
- MTV Roadies (season 13)
- The Voice (India season 2)

== Channels ==
Launches:

- 23 August: Sony Le Plex HD

Rebrandings:

- Unknown: Sony Kix to Sony ESPN
