= Karan Vohra =

Indian television actor

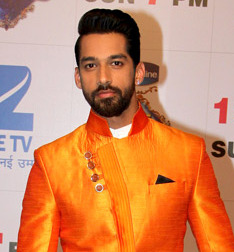
- Born: Delhi, India
- Occupation: Actor
- Years active: 2016–present
- Known for: Zindagi Ki Mehek; Imlie
- Spouse: Bella Vohra (m. 2012)

Karan Vohra is an Indian television actor. He made his acting debut with Zindagi Ki Mehek in 2016, portraying Shaurya Khanna and Shaurya Singh Ahlawat. He is best known for him portrayal Dr. Veer Sahay in Krishna Chali London, Atharv Rana in Imlie and Aryaman Bundela in Main Hoon Saath Tere.

== Early and personal life ==
Vohra was born and brought up in Delhi. He has two siblings named Kunal Vohra and Komal Vohra. His sister Komal, is the ex-wife of rapper Raftaar.

Vohra has been married to Bella Vohra since 2012 and became father to twin boys Arya and Aksh in 2023.

== Career ==
Vohra made his acting debut with Zindagi Ki Mehek, portraying Shaurya Khanna from 2016 to 2018 and Shaurya Ahlawat in 2018 opposite Samiksha Jaiswal. From 2018 to 2019, he portrayed Dr. Veer Sahay in Krishna Chali London opposite Megha Chakraborty.

In 2021, he portrayed ACP Raghav Shastri in Pinjara Khubsurti Ka. From September 2022 to September 2023, he played Atharv Rana in Imlie opposite Megha Chakraborty and Seerat Kapoor.

From April 2024 to August 2024, he played Aryaman Bundela in Main Hoon Saath Tere opposite Ulka Gupta. In August 2024, he appeared as Major Dev Singh Chauhan in Naam Namak Nishan, a web series on Amazon Mini TV.

From April 2025 to August 2025, he played Rishank Jaiswal in Colors TV's Meri Bhavya Life.

== Filmography ==
=== Television ===
Year	Serial	Role	Notes	Ref.
2016–2018	Zindagi Ki Mehek	Shaurya Khanna	Lead Role	
2018	Zindagi Ki Mehek	Shaurya Singh Ahlawat	Lead Role	
2018–2019	Krishna Chali London	Dr. Veer Sahay	Lead Role	
2021	Pinjara Khubsurti Ka	A.C.P. Raghav Shastri	Negative Role	
2022–2023	Imlie	Atharv Rana	Lead Role	
2024	Main Hoon Saath Tere	Aryaman Bundela / Murali	Lead Role	
2025	Meri Bhavya Life	Rishank Jaiswal	Lead Role	

=== Web series ===
Year	Serial	Role	Ref.
2024	Naam Namak Nishan	Major Dev Singh Chauhan	

== Awards and nominations ==
Year	Award	Category	Work	Result	Ref.
2017	Indian Television Academy Awards	Best Actor (Popular)	Zindagi Ki Mehek	Nominated	
2022	Indian Television Academy Awards	Popular Actor (Drama)	Imlie	Nominated	
