= Virasaat (2002 TV series) =

- Created by: Edit II Productions
- Directed by: Sachin Khot
- Starring: see below
- Opening theme: "Virasaat" by
- Country of origin: India
- Original language: Hindi

Production
- Producers: Sanjay Kohli and Benaiffer Kohli
- Running time: approx. 22 minutes

Original release
- Network: Sahara One
- Release: 19 August 2002

Virasaat (transl. Inheritance) is an Indian Hindi-language television series that aired on Sahara TV in 2002.

== Overview ==
The story portrays the lives of Sahni family's members and captures the ups and downs of the six Sahni siblings — four brothers and two sisters. However, the story is mainly based on the emotional bonding between the stepson, Manav and his stepmother, Jayashree.

The trials and tribulations for 'Sahnis' begin after the death of the head of household, Mr. Sahni. This is when the whole family is thrown out of their own house by their uncle, Omkar who cheats to obtain their property. Nevertheless, Mrs. Sahni tries to fight back and stands up for her family. But her own sons withdraw their help & joins in their uncle's misdeed. This is when the stepson, Manav takes up the responsibility to support his stepmother and start life from the scratch.

== Cast ==
- Suhasini Mulay as Jayashree Sahni
- Jaya Bhattacharya
- Vaquar Shaikh as Manav Sahni
- Anupam Bhattacharya
- Juhi Parmar
- Kabir Sadanand
- Rajeev Kumar
- Malavika Shivpuri
- Deepak Dutta
- Chhavi Mittal
- Jayati Bhatia
- Harsh Somaiya
