= Zindagi Ki Mehek =

2016 Indian Hindi TV series

- Genre: Drama
- Created by: Saurabh Tewari
- Written by: Saurabh Tewari; Damini Kanwal Shetty; Srinita Bhoumick; Vibha Tewari; Ishan Bajpai; Malvika Asthana
- Directed by: Cariappa Appaya; Faheim Inamdar; Pushpender Singh
- Creative director: Rohit K Mukherjee
- Starring: Samiksha Jaiswal; Karan Vohra
- Theme music composer: Anand Bajpai; Nishant Pandey
- Country of origin: India
- Original language: Hindi
- No. of seasons: 2
- No. of episodes: 505

Production
- Producers: Saurabh Tewari; Sumeet Chaudhary; Kewal Sethi
- Production locations: Delhi, India
- Cinematography: Kunal Kadam
- Camera setup: Multi-camera
- Running time: 22 minutes
- Production company: Parin Multimedia Private Limited

Original release
- Network: Zee TV
- Release: 19 September 2016 – 1 September 2018

Zindagi Ki Mehek (transl. Scent of Life) is an Indian drama television series which premiered on 19 September 2016 on Zee TV. It replaced Tashan-e-Ishq in its timeslot. It is produced by Parin Media and it starred Samiksha Jaiswal and Karan Vohra.

== Plot ==
=== Season 1 ===
The story of the show is set in Delhi and depicts the journey of a homemaker Mehek and her passion for cooking. She is shy and has social anxiety. Mehek meets top chef Shaurya, and while their cooking styles clash, they fall in love. Soon Mehek meets Shaurya and starts working with him. Shaurya soon falls in love with Mehek, which creates further misunderstanding.

Shaurya Khanna is a rich and wealthy restaurateur in Delhi while Mehek Sharma is a low on confident middle-class girl. Cooking is her hobby and passion, which she has inherited from her deceased mother. Mehek and Shaurya meet at a cooking competition that Shaurya is judging. Through her cooking, Mehek attains attention and importance that greatly pleases her to-be husband Ajay and his materialistic family. Meanwhile, Shaurya insults her throughout the shooting of the show leading to a point where Mehek is publicly humiliated and slaps and insults Shaurya. Shaurya realises his mistake and apologises to her, which she finally accepts.

Mehek agrees to marry Ajay. Mehek's cousin Nehal has a secret affair with Ajay. Ajay rejects Nehal and threatens her forcing her to attempt suicide, but Shaurya saves her. Shaurya tricks Ajay into revealing his true intentions of marrying Mehek, which then caused to the wedding being called off. Shaurya and Mehek develop feelings for each other. Shaurya's mother Karuna fixes their marriage, but Shaurya must prove himself to Mehek's family, which he does. On their wedding day, Mehek is shocked to discover Shaurya has gone abroad to promote his new restaurant and has taken her recipes and their patents with him. It is revealed that Shaurya was planning his revenge on Mehek all this while.

Mehek decides to live in the Khanna household to make Shaurya realise his love for her. Shaurya helps Mehek's best friend Sonal elope with Mehek's brother Mohit. Mohit's grandmother suffers a heart attack, and the Sharmas blame Shaurya. In a fit of rage, Mehek's uncle vandalises Shaurya's restaurant, and in retaliation, Shaurya gets their shops bulldozed. This leads Mehek to give up and leave Shaurya finally. Mehek's ex-fiancé Ajay and Sonal's ex-fiancé Rohit abduct Mehek and try to rape and take advantage of her. Shaurya saves her in the nick of time, but Mehek suffers severe injuries. Her family blames Shaurya and take Mehek away. Finally, the Sharmas accept Shaurya.

Before their wedding day, Shaurya organises security for Mehek, but the chief officer has a connection to a dark secret from Shaurya's past. Just before their wedding, he reveals to Shaurya that 12 years ago, as a child, Shaurya had a car accident, and the couple killed were Mehek's parents. A shocked Shaurya tries to come clean to Mehek, but the ceremony continues, and they are married. Unfortunately, Mehek finds out the truth and believes Shaurya deceived her. She is enraged but pretends to be happily married for the sake of her family. When the Sharmas finally find out, they decide to reopen the case, and Karuna is arrested. Finally, misunderstandings between the families are cleared up.

Rishikesh Track

On their honeymoon in Rishikesh, Mehek witnesses a murder committed by Archie. Archie attacks Mehek, and she is presumed dead in a drowning accident. A year later, Shaurya returns to Rishikesh and runs into Vandana, who looks precisely like Mehek but doesn't remember him. He can bring her memory back, and Archie is killed. Mehek and Shaurya adopt the young Neev and return home.

Terrorist Attack Track

Nehal is pregnant with Shaurya's brother Vicky's child, so the families decide to get them married. During a visit to the mall, there is a terrorist attack and Shaurya is abducted. The terrorist pretends to be Shaurya and enters the Khanna House. Neev discovers this, but his throat is slit leaving him unable to speak. Mehek saves the day, but her family is blackmailed into planting a bomb, but they defeat the terrorists.

Anjali's Track

Karuna's illegitimate daughter Anjali (Aanchal Khurana) enters their lives and creates misunderstandings between Mehek and Karuna. She gets Karuna to throw Mehek and Shaurya out of the house. Karuna names Anjali as the sole heir to her property, but when Mehek announces her pregnancy, Karuna welcomes them back to the family. Eventually, Anjali's truth is revealed, and she is sent to jail, where she meets Shaurya's aunt Svetlana. They decide to break out of prison, but Anjali is killed, and Svetlana pretends that she was preventing Anjali's escape. She is set free and returns home pretending to be blind. In a series of events, Svetlana's revenge materialises as she sets off a bomb at the Khanna house, killing almost all the Khannas and Sharmas. In the end, she shoots Mehek and Shaurya, who vows to return to complete their story before dying.

=== Season 2 ===
Shaurya and Mehek are reborn. Mehek is born into a poor household where her father resents her being a girl. On the other hand, Shaurya is born into a wealthy family. Mehek grows to become a tomboy and again meets Shaurya. Mehek is a bold and fearless personality who quickly picks up fights. Shaurya is practising to become a boxer as his father hopes his son will one day win the gold medal. Visions of their previous life haunt both Shaurya and Mehek. Later, when Mehek and Shaurya have 20 years old, they are brought to the same college, both with the passion of boxing, their relationship constantly flickering because of this. Svetlana again tries to separate Mehek and Shaurya by killing them with the help of a superstitious baba when he reveals to her that if Mehek and Shaurya love each other a second time, her destiny will be sealed. Svetlana kills the sister of Mehek named Swati, who was trying to save Mehek. Mehek recalls her past life, but Svetlana fires two bullets at her. Mehek survives but pretends to be a ghost in front of Svetlana to make her feared. She then meets Shaurya. It is then revealed that Shaurya and Mehek's plan frighten Svetlana to such a level that she confesses her crimes. In the climax, Svetlana is killed by Durga Devi Trishula, and Kanta, kanta then dies right before the end leaving mehek heartbroken and shaurya comforts her, they then get married and life happily ever after

== Cast ==
=== Main ===
- Samiksha Jaiswal as Mehek Singh Mann Ahlawat
- Karan Vohra as Shaurya Singh Ahlawat

=== Recurring ===
- Radha Bhatt as Shwetlana Agarwal
- Aaina Singh as Swati Singh Mann, Mehak's sister
- Sonam Srivastava as Sarita Singh Mann, Swati and Mehak's mother
- Mahesh Bisht as Mehak's Coach
- Sahil Singh Sethi as Jugraj Singh Ahlawat, Shaurya's father
- Neha Sahai as Rashmi Singh Ahlawat, Shaurya's mother
- Sachin Vashist as Shaurya's best friend
- Gazal Sud as Smriti Singh Ahlawat, Shaurya's sister
- Yash Gera as Aarush, Smriti's fiancé
- Harbandana Kaur as Young Mehak Singh Mann
- Aaryan Chaturvedi as Young Shaurya Singh Ahlawat
- Bhavyata Gupta as Young Swati Singh Mann
- Kailash Chakravarthy as Digvijay Khurana
- Kirandeep Sharma as Kanta Sharma
- Priya Gupta as Priya “the manager”
- Hareesh Chhabra as Jeevan Sharma
- Babla Kochhar as Ravi Sharma
- Vijay Meenu as Mansi Sharma
- Siddarth Sipani as Vicky Agarwal
- Shiny Dixit as Nehal Vicky Agarwal
- Rajshree Seem as Karuna Khanna
- Mmeena Mirr as Dolly Massi
- Tripta Lakhanpal as PD
- Ahmer Haider as Doctor
- Dinesh Verma as Balwant Sharma
- Sunny Sachdeva as Mandaar
- Orvana Ghai as Archie
- Vidushi Kaul as Sonal Mohit Sharma
- Anubhav Jain as Mohit Sharma
- Aarif Sharma as Neev
- Aanchal Khurana as Anjali, Shaurya's step-sister
- Ajay Mehra as Sooraj, Anjali's boyfriend
- Vishal Gupta as Sameer Agarwal
- Kiara Rana as Shruti Agarwal
- Harsh Chhaya as Sanjay Agarwal, Shaurya's uncle
- Ashoo Kohli as Kewal "KD" Damaan
- Mihir Mishra as Harish Khanna
  - Sunil Bedi replaced Mihir as Harish Khanna
- Aarun Gossai as Rajeev Kapoor
- Manoj Verma as Ajay Parmar, Mehak's ex-fiancé
- Monica Kohli as Pammi Parmar, Ajay's mother
- Poonam Mathur as Sheetal Patia, Sonal's mother
- Piyush Dadlani as Armaan
- Aasma Sayed as Nalini
- Jasmeet Kaur as Nikita
- Arjit Taneja as Vivan

== Adaptations ==
Language	Title	Original Release	Network(s)	Last aired	Notes
Tamil	Nala Damayanthi நள தமயந்தி	9 October 2023	Zee Tamil	25 May 2024	Remake
