= Ritu Chaudhary =

Indian television actress

- Born: 17 May; Delhi, India
- Occupation: Television Actress
- Years active: 2002–present
- Spouse: Gautam Seth
- Children: Ivana Seth

Ritu Chaudhary is an Indian television actress. She played Niyati Vansh Khanna in Kuchh Jhuki Palkain, Shobha Virani in Kyunki Saas Bhi Kabhi Bahu Thi, Manasi Amar Jaitley in Dil Na Jaane Kyun, Ritika Bhakar Gupta in Awaz – Dil Se Dil Tak, Vedashree Shekhar Rathore in Nazar, Aparna Pankaj Tripathi in Imlie and Sunita Agnivanshi in Baazi Ishq Ki.

== Television ==
Year	Serial	Role	Channel	Co–Star
2002–2003	Kuchh Jhuki Palkain	Niyati Vansh Khanna	Sony Entertainment Television	Pracheen Chauhan
2002–2008	Kyunki Saas Bhi Kabhi Bahu Thi	Shobha Virani / Shobha Vishal Mehra	Star Plus	Rohit Bakshi; Vivan Bhatena; Nasir Khan
2003	Dil Na Jaane Kyun	Manasi Amar Jaitley	Zee TV	Vineet Sharma; Vikas Sethi
2003	Ssshhhh...Koi Hai – Vikraal Aur Alkatzar	Koyena (Episode 94)	Star Plus	Pracheen Chauhan
2003–2004	Awaz – Dil Se Dil Tak	Ritika Bhaskar Gupta	Zee TV	Amit Sadh; Aamir Dalvi
2004	Raat Hone Ko Hai – Marriage: Part 1 to Part 4	(Episode 9 to Episode 12)	Sahara One	Hrishikesh Pandey
2007–2008	Meri Awaz Ko Mil Gayi Roshni	Sunita Prakash Chopra	Star Plus	Jiten Lalwani
2009	Koi Aane Ko Hai – Gulmohar	Ambika	Colors TV	
2016	Bade Bhaiyya Ki Dulhania	Madhu Pant	Sony Entertainment Television	
2017	Iss Pyaar Ko Kya Naam Doon 3	Leela Raizada	Star Plus	
2018–2020	Nazar	Vedashree Shekhar Rathore	Star Plus	Amit Kaushik
2019	Nazar	Kalashree	Star Plus	
2020–2022	Imlie	Aparna Pankaj Tripathi	Star Plus	Chandresh Singh
2023	Baazi Ishq Ki	Sunita Agnivanshi	Dangal	
2025–2026	Kyunki Saas Bhi Kabhi Bahu Thi 2	Shobha Virani	Star Plus	

== Short films ==
Year	Show	Role	Channel
2022	Infertility		YouTube
