= Yash Gera =

Indian actor and DJ (born 1986)

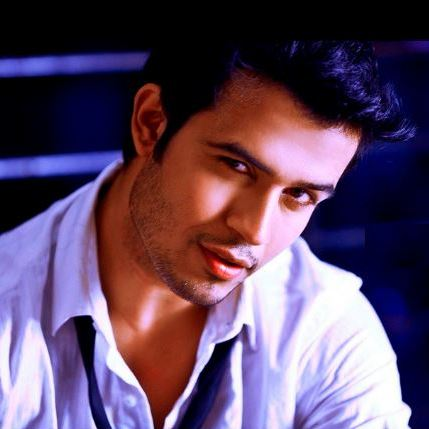
- Born: 25 May 1986 (age 39); New Delhi, India
- Occupation(s): Actor, model
- Years active: 2004–present
- Known for: Pyaar Kii Ye Ek Kahaani Yeh Rishta Kya Kehlata Hai

Yash Gera (born 25 May 1986) is an Indian model, actor, anchor and DJ (disc jockey) from the capital city of India, New Delhi. He was born in a Punjabi Hindu family and works in an entertainment and media industry. He has been part of Ramp shows, print ads, commercial and television serials. He has also been the anchor for a number of corporate, entertainment, private and Bollywood events.

== Early life ==
Yash Gera was born in New Delhi, India. He's the son of Late.sh.Dharam Pal Gera. He studied at the Delhi University College of Vocational Studies (2004 to 2007).

== Modeling career ==
Yash Gera started his career as a model in 2006. He has done several commercial ads for products like Gillette, Panasonic shaver, Canon, Colgate, LG Flatron, Lotto Shoes and Poloraid Sunglasses. He is also seen with Saif Ali Khan in Chevrolet AVEO Advertisement. He is the brand ambassador of 'STEEL' Men's skin care and was the Mr. MTV Face of the week in February 2009.

== Television career ==
Yash Gera started his career as a DJ (Disc-Jockey) in 2004. He shifted to Mumbai in year 2009 to pursue his modelling and acting career. He got his first break in acting in March 2009 in Palampur Express, telecast on Sony Entertainment Television. Yash played the character of "Paaji", who is the leader of Adarsh School. Yash Gera also played the role of Prateek, who is parallel lead in Bairi Piya on Colors (TV channel). He also did Come Along Lets Grow Together business show as a host for Sahara Samay Channel. In Pyaar Kii Ye Ek Kahaani on Star One he played the role of Shankar Menon, who is in love with the character of Misha Dobriyal. He has also appeared in two films Ussey Kya Ho Jayega and Chori Ka Maal Mori Mein. He played a crucial character (Bajrang Bhaiya) in the show Kuch Toh Log Kahenge. He was seen in the horror soap Fear Files: Darr Ki Sacchi Tasvirein as lead character named "Surender" aired on Saturday 6 April 2013 at 10.30pm on Zee TV. Yash Gera portrayed the negative role of Vikram in the Channel Big Magic Channel Serial Jai Maa Vindhyavasini. The actor replaced Ather Habib who played the role of Shaurya Maheshwari in the popular Star Plus serial Yeh Rishta Kya Kehlata Hai. He was last seen in the Zee TV Show Zindagi Ki Mehek in a negative role.

== Television ==
Year	Serial	Role
2009	Palampur Express	Paji
2010	Tere Liye	Uttam
2010	Bairi Piya	Prateek
2010	Pyaar Kii Ye Ek Kahaani	Shankar Menon
2012	Kuch Toh Log Kahenge	Bajrang Tiwari
2013	Fear Files	Surendra (Episode 79)
2013	Jai Maa Vindhyavasini	Vikram
2013–2017	Yeh Rishta Kya Kehlata Hai	Shaurya Maheshwari
2018	Zindagi Ki Mehek	Aarush
2018	Vikram Betaal Ki Rahasya Gatha	Naagraj
2019	Crime Alert	Suhas
2020	Laal Ishq – Jal Rakshas	Episode 214
2024–2025	Jagriti: Ek Nayi Subah	Harish
