= Awaz – Dil Se Dil Tak =

Indian drama television series

- Directed by: Arvind Babbal Santosh Bhatt
- Country of origin: India
- Original language: Hindi
- No. of seasons: 1
- No. of episodes: 119

Production
- Running time: 30 minutes

Original release
- Network: Zee TV
- Release: 10 August 2003 – 2 March 2004

Awaz – Dil Se Dil Tak is an Indian television series which aired on Zee TV channel. A Mumbai-London flight gets hijacked and a tussle ensues between the passengers and the hijackers resulting in a plane crash. The show began from 10 August 2003 and ended by 2 March 2004.

== Overview ==
The opening episodes introduce the various characters of the serial and simultaneously unfold the conspiracy of a plane hijack. The plot builds up with focus on the ill-fated A.P.-106 Mumbai to London flight.

The hijackers board the plane but are unable to take charge of the flight. In an ensuing fight between the hijackers and the crew members the plane crashes.

Search operation for the debris of the aircraft is ordered, but nothing is found. The world is shocked by the news of the tragedy.

The story takes an unexpected turn when 18 people out of 426 passengers survive but are marooned on an island. These 18 people have nothing in common except that they were together on the ill-fated flight. Each one tries to survive on his/her own but gradually realizes that their survival depends on their unity and collective spirit. A bond starts building amongst them and slowly they come to terms with the reality.

Meanwhile, the families of the victims are mourning the loss of their loved ones. Some are going through denial while others are trying to cope with the loss.

As time passes the passengers start believing that they are stranded on this island for the rest of their lives. But destiny has something else in store for them. They are rescued and are reunited with their families. The exhilaration of returning to their homes is combined with the pain of shattering relationships.

== Cast ==
- Rohini Hattangadi
- Amit Sadh as Bhaskar Gupta
- Raj Singh Verma as Neeraj
- Moonmoon Banerjee as Ritika Bhaskar Gupta
- Amit Behl
- Ram Kapoor as ACP Vishal Kapoor / DCP Vishal Kapoor
- Varun Badola as Aman
- Govind Namdev as Bhai Ji
- Sudhir Pandey as Harjeet Singh
- Yash Sinha as Vinay (Vinu) Tiwari
- Manasi Salvi as Sargam Vinay Tiwari
- Amardeep Jha as Harjeet Singh's Wife
- Aamir Dalvi as Karan
- Ritu Chaudhary as Ritika Bhaskar Gupta
- Alka Kaushal
- Savita Prabhune as Mrs. Gupta (Pramod and Bhaskar's Mother)
- Gautam Chaturvedi as Pramod Gupta
- Lata Sabharwal as Lata Pramod Gupta
- Nagesh Salwan
- Naresh Suri as Mr. Gupta (Pramod and Bhaskar's Father)
- Benika Bisht
- Uday Tikekar as Police Commissioner Raj Desai
- Meenakshi Verma as Mrs. Desai
- Dimple Inamdar as Sargam
- Sai Ballal as Tanya's Father
- Shama Deshpande as Tanya's Mother
- Navni Parihar
- Pooja Gandhi as Tanya
- Zoya Chaudhary
- Vineet Kumar
- Barkha Madan
- Rahul Lohani as Nisaar Ahmed
- Indu Verma as Esha Vishal Kapoor
- Nisaar Khan
