= Tonight's the Night (TV series) =

- Genre: Light entertainment
- Presented by: John Barrowman
- Country of origin: United Kingdom
- Original language: English
- No. of series: 3
- No. of episodes: 22

Production
- Production locations: BBC Television Centre (2009); BBC Pacific Quay (2010); Dock10 (2011)
- Running time: 60 minutes (2009, 2011); 50 minutes (2010)
- Production company: Barrowman Barker Productions

Original release
- Network: BBC One
- Release: 18 April 2009 – 3 December 2011

Tonight's the Night is a BBC light entertainment television programme which was shown on BBC One from 18 April 2009 to 3 December 2011, presented by actor and singer John Barrowman.

== Format ==
The show is based around making audience members' wishes come true, featuring ordinary people living out their fantasies for real.

There are no rules as to who can appear on the show; it features ordinary members of the public nominated by friends who think they have a hidden talent or other special reason. Every guest has the help of Barrowman and other celebrity guests.

The studio audience are also involved in the show, as John surprises unsuspecting members of the public, making their wishes come true on the night even if they hadn't signed up for the show.

It contains at its heart elements of classic 1980s entertainment shows, such as Surprise, Surprise, Jim'll Fix It, and Beadle's About.

== Transmissions ==
Series	Start date	End date	Episodes
1	18 April 2009	23 May 2009	6
2	17 July 2010	11 September 2010	8
3	9 July 2011	3 December 2011	8

== Doctor Who Sketch ==
A short Doctor Who sketch aired as part of the 23 May 2009 episode. It featured John Barrowman reprising his role as Jack Harkness, David Tennant as himself, and competition winner Tim Ingham as alien Sao Til. In the short, set on the TARDIS, Barrowman and Ingham alternate between playing their characters and playing themselves as actors on the TARDIS set.

== International versions ==
Country	Name	Host	Network	Date premiered
India	Aaj Ki Raat Hai Zindagi	Amitabh Bachchan	STAR Plus	October 18, 2015 – January 10, 2016
Italy	Stasera è la tua sera	Max Giusti	Rai 1	March 25 – April 15, 2010
