= Jai Maa Vindhyavasini =

- Genre: Mythological Drama
- Written by: Rajesh Berry & Yogesh Vikrant
- Directed by: Yatindra Rawat (Bablu)
- Starring: See below
- Theme music composer: Sarojini Sinha
- Opening theme: "Jai Maa Vindhyavasini" by Anuja Sinh
- Original language: Hindi
- No. of seasons: 1

Production
- Executive producers: Monoj Giria; Aashish Agarwal
- Producers: Rajesh Berry; Leora Sinha; Giridhar Sharma
- Cinematography: Durgesh Sharma
- Editor: Feroz B. Khan
- Camera setup: Multi-camera
- Running time: Approx. 24 minutes
- Production company: Khalome Media

Original release
- Network: BIG Magic
- Release: 20 May 2013

Jai Maa Vindhyavasini is an Indian mythological-drama series based on the life of a girl named Gauri, who is a strong believer in the powers of Maa Vindhyavasini. The series premiered on BIG Magic on 20 May 2013.

== Cast ==
- Divya Malik as Gauri
- Shashank Sethi as Shiv
- Hans Dev Sharma as Gauri's Father
- Akshita Arora as Dadi
- Yash Gera as Vikram
- Aasma Sayed as Gunjan
- Amit Sinha as Neeraj
- Nirmal Kant as Surajbhaan
- Suruchi Verma as Kamla
- Dipti Sadhak as Mukti
- Sagam rai as Sangam
- Suruchi Verma as Kamla
- Zoya Khan as Tulika
- Roshni Rajput as Maina
- Kritika Sharma as Monika
