= Sunflower (TV series) =

Indian web series

- Promotional poster
- Genre: Crime; Thriller; Comedy
- Created by: Vikas Bahl
- Written by: Vikas Bahl =Jasmeet Singh Bhatia Season 2
- Directed by: Vikas Bahl; Rahul Sengupta; Navin Gujral
- Starring: Sunil Grover
- Composers: Background score; Sahej Bakshi; Sarvesh Shrivastava
- Country of origin: India
- Original language: Hindi
- No. of seasons: 2
- No. of episodes: 16 (list of episodes)

Production
- Cinematography: Sudhakar Reddy Yakkanti
- Editor: Konarak Saxena
- Production company: Reliance Entertainment

Original release
- Network: ZEE5
- Release: 11 June 2021 – present

Sunflower is an Indian black comedy web series created by Vikas Bahl for ZEE5. It is produced by Reliance Entertainment, starring actor-comedian Sunil Grover in the lead role as Sonu. The cast includes actors like Ranvir Shorey, Girish Kulkarni, Mukul Chadda, Shonali Nagrani, Sonal Jha and Ashish Vidyarthi.

The first season consisted of 8 episodes, it started streaming on ZEE5 on June 11, 2021, and received generally positive reviews from critics and audience for its direction, writing and acting.

Following its release, ZEE5 renewed the series for a second season, with actress Adah Sharma joining the cast for the season. The second season premiered on March 1, 2024.

== Plot ==
The story revolves around a murder mystery based in a middle-class housing society in Mumbai called "Sunflower".

== Cast ==
- Sunil Grover as Sonu Singh
- Adah Sharma as Rosie Mehta
- Ranvir Shorey as Inspector S. Digendra
- Girish Kulkarni as Sub Inspector Chetan Tambe
- Mukul Chadda as Mr. Ahuja
- Radha Bhatt as Mrs. Ahuja
- Ashish Vidyarthi as Dilip Iyer
- Ashwin Kaushal as Mr Raj Kapoor
- Ria Nalavade as Paddy Iyer
- Shonali Nagrani as Naina Kapoor
- Sonal Jha as Mrs Iyer
- Nirvair Bhan as Monty
- Navdeep Tomar as Society Watchman
- Sameer Khakhar as abusive heart-patient
- Sal Yusuf as Chairman of Sonu Singh's Company
- Salonie Patel as Aanchal
- Annapurna Soni as Maid Kamini
- Dayana Erappa as Justina
- Pallavi Das as Juhi
- Ajay–Atul as judges of singing competition (guest appearance)
- Simran Nerurkar as Gurleen
- Aarav Chowdhary as Ramesh Kapoor
- Jaimin Panchal
- Shayank shukla as Aditya khanna

== Episodes ==
=== Series overview ===
Series	Episodes	Originally released
1	8	11 June 2021
2	8	1 March 2024

=== Season 1 (2021) ===
No. overall	No. in season	Title	Directed by	Written by	Original release date
1	1	"A Murder"	Vikas Bahl	Vikas Bahl	11 June 2021
Murder is executed by Neighbours and they tried to hide the evidences. Sonu was not aware and very careless in his dealings with police, which brought him under notice of police.
2	2	"A Break-in"	Vikas Bahl	Vikas Bahl	11 June 2021
Neighbour, Mr Ahuja tried to dispose of the Evidence and was very close, but could not do so completely. Mumbai Police personnel broke into the Flat with his Girlfriend to make illicit relations and Mr Ahuja could not get away with Coconut Straw and sleep till Morning under the influence of Alcohol. The delivery boy who delivered Chinese Food to both Sonu and Kapur was apprehended.
3	3	"A Discovery"	Vikas Bahl	Vikas Bahl	11 June 2021
In another parallel story, Society members are portrayed who are trying to safeguard their cultural interest from Ultra Modern anti-cultural Newbies. Police made Delivery Boy and Sonu, for the recap of Murder night counter between them. The comic incidence of Sonu with Cab Driver is depicted humorously. Sonu and his crush at the office are depicted in a typical manner.
4	4	"The Coconut"	Vikas Bahl	Vikas Bahl	11 June 2021
Maid was apprehended. Sonu tried to be part of the Party at his self claimed Social Influencer Neighbour. Coconut Vendor who delivers every second day arrives at Sunflower, who came to know of the Murder. In the same context, Police tried to locate the Coconut. In the Office, Sonu's Crush lands to his peer. Mr Ahuja trying to get rid of Coconut and eventually it landed in Sonu's Dustbin.
5	5	"A Crush"	Vikas Bahl	Vikas Bahl	11 June 2021
Previous quarrel over parking between Ahuja and Kapoor is shown. Maharashtra Police found a bottle of rat poison and thought Sonu was behind Murder and tried to falsely frame them. Son's Crush is impressed by falsely assuming Sonu as a Bad Boy.
6	6	"A Heart Attack"	Vikas Bahl	Vikas Bahl	11 June 2021
Boss of Sonu, is trying to find the accused who leaked his upcoming product, coincidentally Her daughter found the same at the Sonu's Neighbour Party. Sonu tried to save himself by hiding. Inspector came again to Mr Ahuja and asked about the presence of his newspaper with Kapoor's dead body.
7	7	"A Recollection"	Vikas Bahl	Vikas Bahl	11 June 2021
Sub Inspector visits Ex Wife of Kapoor, who is with younger brother of Kapoor as live in Partner. Inspector recalls steps over building column joining both flats and visits Mr Ahuja balcony to confirm and detected few other signs.
8	8	"A Chase"	Vikas Bahl	Vikas Bahl	11 June 2021
Maharashtra Police find false motive for Sonu to murder Kapoor with the help of Ex of Sonu. But Sonu was kidnapped just before Police was about to arrest him.

=== Season 2 (2024) ===
No. overall	No. in season	Title	Directed by	Written by	Original release date
9	1	"A Confession"	Navin Gujral	Surya Menen, Jasmeet Singh Bhatia	1 March 2024
Sonu is back at Sunflower Society! Police officers Tambe and Digendra race to arrest him for his involvement in the Kapoor murder case. An unexpected theft and confession add a twist to the tale.
10	2	"The Punjab Story"	Navin Gujral	Surya Menen, Jasmeet Singh Bhatia	1 March 2024
The police question Sonu and the Ahujas, and Sonu takes them through his adventures in Punjab. Romance brews in Digendra’s life. Sunflower Society comes across Rosie, the mysterious new tenant.
11	3	"Cross Connection"	Navin Gujral	Surya Menen, Jasmeet Singh Bhatia	1 March 2024
Love knocks on Sonu’s door with the beautiful yet sly Rosie. Alarm bells go off for Digendra and Tambe when they learn about Rosie's arrangement with Mr Kapoor. Sonu makes it back to the list of suspects.
12	4	"Lucky Number 786"	Navin Gujral	Surya Menen, Jasmeet Singh Bhatia	1 March 2024
The investigation takes a turn when Digendra and Tambe find new information connecting Sonu to the case. But a shocking revelation leads them to a new and unlikely suspect.
13	5	"The Dead Eye"	Navin Gujral	Surya Menen, Jasmeet Singh Bhatia	1 March 2024
Digendra questions Iyer about his involvement in the case. More leads and new details give the seemingly straightforward case a strange turn.
14	6	"The Glitter"	Navin Gujral	Surya Menen, Jasmeet Singh Bhatia	1 March 2024
Sonu and Rosie’s romance continues. Mr Kapoor’s maid, Kamini Bai, sheds more light on the case that seems to implicate Sonu yet again. Digendra finds the actual murder weapon at an unlikely place.
15	7	"Piggy"	Navin Gujral	Surya Menen, Jasmeet Singh Bhatia	1 March 2024
All the facts, the usual suspects, and the murder weapon now paint a clearer picture for officers Digendra and Tambe. The dark side of Iyer gets revealed.
16	8	"Last Piece of the Puzzle"	Navin Gujral	Surya Menen, Jasmeet Singh Bhatia	1 March 2024
Sonu finds himself at the centre of the mess as his connection with Rosie entangles him further in the murder case. The case is finally closed with the revelation of the unexpected murderer.

== Release ==
The first seasons of this ZEE5 original web series premiered on June 11, 2021. The second season premiered on March 1, 2024.

== Critical reception ==
=== Season 1 ===
Archika Khurana from TOI says that Sunflower Season 1 is an engrossing thriller laced with dark humor. TOI rates the web series at 3 out of 5. The web series could have been a bigger success if it did not have a laid-back execution. Sunil Grover gets full marks as he plays the role of Sonu Singh to perfection.

From Vakaao, Aashna Varshney says that the web series is a great watch as Sunil Grover and the major plotline both impresses you as the season progresses. Many different subplots make the web series a little disturbing as the focus seems to be losing from the main murder mystery plot. However, the main storyline and Sonu Singh's performance is worth the watch and a recommended entertainer.

Divy Tripathi from Film Companion says that this web series is a beautiful experience with spot-on direction and acting. Ranveer Shorey plays the character of a no-nonsense cop with perfection and teamed with Girish Kulkarni, the duo looks perfect as investigating officers.

=== Season 2 ===
The season drew mix response from critics. The Times of India rated it 3 out of 5 and called it as "Overall, ‘Sunflower 2’ offers a compelling continuation" News 18 too rated it 3 out of 5 while praising the work of Sunil Grover and Adah Sharma.

Firstpost was less welcoming of the show, commenting, "Sunflower tries to pack in way too many things into one season, mainly to create a complete package."
