= Iqbal Azad =

Indian actor

- Occupation: Actor
- Years active: 1994–present

Iqbal Azad is an Indian film and television actor. He has mainly worked in the television Industry, acted in serials Nadaniyaan, Tedi Medi Family and Bepannah. He has also worked in films including Mukt (2001), 340 (2009), and It's a Man's World (2010).

== Career ==
Azad was born in Patna. He began his acting career in theatre before moving to advertising and later television. Alongside his television work, he has remained active in theatre and has also appeared in web series. He also made his directorial debut with the short film IDelete.

== Filmography ==
=== Television ===
Year	Title	Role	Notes	Ref.
1998	Tea Time Manoranjan			
1995	Tehkikaat		Episode 46–47	
1998	Woh	Inspector Shinde		
1999	Intezaar Aur Sahi			
2001	Choti Maa...Ek Anokha Bandhan			
2002–2003	Kuchh Jhuki Palkain			
2004	Hatim	Grand Vizier		
2004–2007	Kesar	Police Commissioner Arjun Gill		
2004–2005	Special Squad	Abbas "Boxer" Ali		
2005–2007	Sindoor Tere Naam Ka	Rajan		
2006	F.I.R.	Hanuman Prasad Pandey	2 episodes	
2008–2010	Kabhi Saas Kabhi Bahu	Virender "Veeru" Awasthi		
2010	Nanhi Si Meri Ladli			
2011	Surya: The Super Cop			
2013	Ghar Aaja Pardesi	Madhav Mishra		
2013	Nadaniyaan	Naman "Nandu" Verma		
2014	Adaalat	Advocate Manoj Kumar	6 episodes	
2015	Tere Sheher Mein	Hari Bhardwaj		
2015	Tedi Medi Family	Vivek Khurana		
2017–2018	Vani Rani	Ajay Kumar Agnihotri		
2018	Bepannah	Waseem Siddiqui		
2020	Laal Ishq		Episode 209: "Grih Pravesh"	
2020	Pinjra Khoobsurti Ka	Akhilesh Dubey		
2021–2022	Vidrohi	Charan Patnaik		
2022–2023	Sherdil Shergill	Ajeet Shergill		
2023	Baghin			
2023	Swaraj	Subhash Chandra Bose		
2023–2025	Kaise Mujhe Tum Mil Gaye	Jayesh Chitnis		
2025	Meri Bhavya Life	Vinay Agarwal		
2026	Do Duniya Ek Dil	Vinay Pandey		

=== Films ===
Year	Title	Role	Notes
2001	Mukt		
2009	340	Burji	
2010	It's a Man's World		Special appearance
