= Sheetal Maulik =

Indian television actress

- Occupation: Television Actress
- Years active: 2002–present
- Height: 5 ft 3 in (1.60 m)
- Spouse: Shaumik Maulik (m. 2005)
- Children: Shanaya Maulik (daughter)

Sheetal Maulik is an Indian television actress.

== Filmography ==
Year	Film	Role
2012	Kuni Mulgi Deta Ka Mulgi	Mohini

=== Television ===
Year	Serial	Role
2004	Aakrosh	
2005	Akkad Bakkad Bambey Bo	Sheena
2007–2008	Sun Yaar Chill Maar	Diya
2008–2009	Aye Dil-E-Nadaan	Simran
2009	Bhootwala Serial	Riya
2010	C.I.D. – Rahasyamayi Darwaza	Dr. Sameera (Episode 620)
2010–2011	Woh Rehne Waali Mehlon Ki	Dimple
2010–2012; 2014	Gutur Gu	Smita Balu Kumar
2013	Jo Biwi Se Kare Pyaar	Shantilakshmi
2014	C.I.D. – Anu Malik Par Hamla	Shruti (Episode 1075)
2014	Adaalat	Advocate Disha
2015	Zindagi Khatti Meethi	Meghmala Deeptiman Roy Choudhury
2017	Jeet Gayi Toh Piya Morey	Ambika Chauhan
2018	Qayamat Ki Raat	Mamata Sumeet Thakur
2019	Yeh Un Dinon Ki Baat Hai	Sejal Gadkari
2019–2020	Pyaar Ki Luka Chuppi	Kalyani
2020–2023	Ghum Hai Kisikey Pyaar Meiin	Sonali Omkar Chavan
2022	Ravivaar With Star Parivaar	Sonali Omkar Chavan
2023–2024	Barsatein – Mausam Pyaar Ka	Neeta Akash Khurana
2024	Suhaagan	Manju Sharma
2024–2025	Deewaniyat	Rani Hooda
2025	Meri Bhavya Life	Priya Jaiswal
2025	Kabhi Neem Neem Kabhi Shahad Shahad	Ambika Chandrakant Jindal

== Short films ==
Year	Title	Role
2021	PEP Talks	Desperate Woman In Love
