= Radha Bhatt =

Indian actress

- Education: Hansraj College; Delhi College of Arts and Commerce
- Occupation: Actress
- Spouse: Rohan Puri

Radha Bhatt is an Indian actress who was born in Udham Singh Nagar, Uttarakhand. She played in The Lost Salesman of Delhi (2014), Take Care (2016) and Chal Jaa Bapu (2018) and web series like The Family Man, Sunflower, and Physics Wallah.

== Early life and education ==
Radha Bhatt was born in a small village near Udham Singh Nagar, Uttarakhand.

After graduating from Hansraj College, she worked in the corporate sector while pursuing a master’s degree at Delhi College of Arts and Commerce.

== Career ==
She worked at Ernst & Young for three years in a corporate role. After clearing her NET exam, she joined Shri Ram College of Commerce as an assistant professor in its Commerce Department. Her break into television came with the show Agar Tum Saath Ho, and later appeared in Zindagi Ki Mehak. She had roles in the OTT space. She played in The Family Man, She was also featured in Manikarnika. She gained significant recognition for her role as Mrs. Ahuja in the web series Sunflower,

== Personal life ==
In 2018, she married her Delhi-based boyfriend Rohan Puri.

== Filmography ==
Year	Title	Role	Ref.
2016	Agar Tum Saath Ho	Zeba	
2016	Zindagi Ki Mehak	Shwetlana Agarwal	
2019	Manikarnika: The Queen of Jhansi	Parvatibai	
2021	The Family Man		
2021	Sunflower	Mrs. Ahuja	
2022	Goodbye	Harish's Teacher	
2022	Physics Wallah	Aditi Pandey	
