= Kuchh Jhuki Palkain =

- Intertitle of Kuchh Jhuki Palkain
- Created by: Balaji Telefilms
- Screenplay by: Kamlesh Kunti Singh; Dialogues; Brijendra Kala
- Directed by: Rahul Kapoor & Shyam Maheshwari
- Creative director: Mitu Kumar
- Starring: see below
- Opening theme: "Kuchh Jhuki Palkain" by KK & Mahalaxmi Iyer
- Country of origin: India
- No. of seasons: 1
- No. of episodes: 147

Production
- Producers: Ekta Kapoor & Shobha Kapoor
- Cinematography: Narendra Joshi
- Editor: Lalit Tiwari
- Running time: approx. 24 minutes

Original release
- Network: Sony TV
- Release: 29 April 2002 – 8 January 2003

Kuchh Jhuki Palkain is an Indian television drama series that aired on Sony TV. The series premiered on 29 April 2002 and aired on weekdays at 14:00 (IST).

== Plot ==
Niyati (Ritu Chaudhary) is a simple Indian girl who marries Vansh (Pracheen Chauhan), who is returning from the US. Vansh had a girlfriend in the US but married Niyati only due to family pressure. Slowly Vansh starts to fall for Niyati but things become complicated when his ex-girlfriend is revealed to be Archita (Sheetal Shah) — Niyati's elder rebellious sister. Things take a turn for the worse when Vansh's parents are revealed to be his grandparents and he is revealed to be the illicit son of his sister Manta from a love affair. The show follows Niyati and Vansh as they try to save their relationship and deal with the problems that surround them.

== Cast ==
- Ritu Chaudhary as Niyati Vansh Khanna
- Pracheen Chauhan as Vansh Khanna
- Sandeep Baswana
- Nayan Bhatt as Mrs. Khanna
- Gayatri Zariwala Rana
- Sheetal Shah as Archita
- Iqbal Azad
- Subbiraj Kakkar
- Usha Bachani
- Gautam Chaturvedi
- Mandeep Bhandar
- Prakash Ramchandani
- Anuj Gupta
- Rakesh Paul
