= Havan (TV series) =

- Genre: Drama
- Created by: Director Kut's Productions
- Written by: Rahil Qaazi
- Creative directors: Nimisha Pandey; Shashank Kunwar
- Starring: See below
- Country of origin: India
- Original language: Hindi
- No. of seasons: 01
- No. of episodes: 135

Production
- Producer: Rajan Shahi
- Editor: Sameer Gandhi
- Running time: 24 minutes
- Production company: Director Kut's Productions

Original release
- Network: Colors TV
- Release: 26 September 2011 – 30 March 2012

Havan (transl. Offering Prayers to God in Front of Fire) is an Indian television drama series that premiered on 26 September 2011 and ended on 30 March 2012. It aired on Colors on weekday evenings. The show is produced by Rajan Shahi of Director's Kut Productions.

== Plot ==
Havan is a story about a devotee and God. It is true that one unites with God only after one's life, but what if a devotee meets her God in real life? Not only that, what if she is connected to him through a relationship? Havan tries to deal with such a relationship and tries to explore relationships built around this premise.

Havan, although a story of God and devotee, is not a religious show. Instead, it tries to understand the human side of the whole set up, the interrelationships, the conflicts within, the idea of faith and belief, and the power of love. It deals with a gamut of human emotions in our society, without getting judgmental about the society or a person in particular.

== Cast ==
=== Main ===
- Narendra Jha as Hari Om Baapji
- Shrenu Parikh as Aastha
- Kunal Verma as Atharva

=== Recurring ===
- Shubhangi Atre Poorey as Trushna
- Prachi Thakker as Manjali
- Aarya Dharmchand Kumar as Yajur
- Darshan Kumar
- Darpan Shrivastava
- Preeti Chaudhary as Hari Om's daughter
- Sanjay Swaraj
- Samta Sagar as Lajjo
- Pankaj Bhatia
- Pracheen Chauhan as Keerat
