= Bahu Begum (2019 TV series) =

Indian romantic drama television series

- Genre: Drama; Romance
- Created by: Prateek Sharma
- Starring: See below
- Country of origin: India
- Original languages: Hindi; Urdu
- No. of seasons: 1
- No. of episodes: 134

Production
- Producers: Prateek Sharma; Suman Sharma
- Production location: Mumbai
- Editors: Amit Singh; Krishna Mahto
- Camera setup: Multi-camera
- Running time: 24 Minutes Approximately
- Production company: LSD Films Private Limited

Original release
- Network: Colors TV
- Release: 15 July 2019 – 21 January 2020

Bahu Begum is an Indian romantic drama television series that aired from 15 July 2019 to 21 January 2020 on Colors TV. Produced by Prateek Sharma under LSD Films, it starred Arjit Taneja, Samiksha Jaiswal and Diana Khan.

== Premise ==
The story follows the lives of Azaan Akhtar Mirza, Noor Qureshi and Shayra Sayyad as they are bound to a marriage due to misunderstandings and fate.

== Plot ==
Razia Mirza (Simone Singh), known as Bahu Begum is the matriarch of a ruling family of Bhopal. 5 years ago her son Azaan (Arjit Taneja) moved to London to pursue studies. As he returns, Razia plans his marriage with his childhood friend Noor (Samiksha Jaiswal), whose mother Yasmin is also her friend. Azaan introduces his own love Shayra to Razia, who accepts her. Noor is now engaged to her colleague, Faiz. On the same day she marries him, Azaan weds Shayra. Yasmin and Faiz get trapped in the kitchen locked by Azaan's evil aunt Suraiya that blasts, killing them.

Noor blames Shayra as she was the last person leaving the kitchen. She asks Shayra to make her marry Azaan, who finally weds Noor but refuses to leave Shayra. Later she realises her mistake and divorces Azaan. Also, Suraiya is exposed and expelled from the home. Adil, Azaan's half-brother kidnaps a pregnant Shayra. Noor goes to rescue her; Adil hits her with his car. Shayra falls off a valley, miscarries and is presumed dead.

=== Five years later ===
An auction is happening in Begum Mahal. Noor, now rich, buys it. Azaan loses all the property, disbelieving Shayra is dead, and has a miserable life. Adil takes loans on the properties in royal family's name. Noor tries to bring back Azaan to his previous life, and succeeds as Razia wakes up from coma. Starting a new life, Azaan proposes to her for marriage, which she accepts, and they embrace. Shayra is revealed to be alive and returns in the epilogue. The Mirzas are shocked. The show ends on a cliffhanger.

== Cast ==
=== Main ===
- Arjit Taneja as Azaan Akhtar Mirza: Ayub and Razia's son; Saba's brother; Adil's half-brother; Ghazala's grandson; Shayra's love interest turned and Noor's childhood best-friend turned husband respectively
- Samiksha Jaiswal as Begum Noor Mirza (née Hasan Qureshi) Yasmin's daughter; Azaan's childhood best-friend turned second wife; Ayub and Razia's second daughter-in-law; Faiz's former fiancée; Saba's second sister-in-law
- Diana Khan as Begum Shayra Mirza (née Sayyad): Azaan's love interest turned first wife; Ayub and Razia's first daughter-in-law; Saba's first sister-in-law
- Simone Singh as Bahu Begum Razia Mirza: Bhopal's matriarchal queen; Ayub's first wife; Azaan and Saba's mother; Shayra and Noor's mother-in-law; Yasmin's best-friend; Adil's step-mother; Ghazala's elder first daughter-in-law (2019–2020)

=== Recurring ===
- Amrapali Gupta as Begum Suraiya Mirza: Asgar's wife; Azaan's aunt; Khalid's mother; Rubina's mother-in-law; Ghazala's younger daughter-in-law (2019)
- Mohammad Nazim as Asgar Akhtar Mirza: Suraiya's husband; Ayub's brother; Azaan's uncle; Khalid's father; Rubina's father-in-law; Ghazala's younger son (2019)
- Rehaan Roy as Khalid Akhtar Mirza: Asgar and Suraiya's son; Azaan's cousin; Rubina's husband; Noor's former obsessive lover; Ghazala's grandson (2019–2020)
- Sabina Jat as Begum Rubina Mirza: Khalid's wife; Asgar and Suraiya's daughter-in-law (2019–2020)
- Alka Kaushal as Begum Ghazala Mirza: Ayub and Asgar's mother; Razia and Suraiya's mother-in-law; Azaan, Khalid, Saba and Adil's grandmother (2019)
- Supriya Shukla as Yasmin Qureshi: Razia's best friend; Noor's mother (2019)
- Puneet Sharma as Faiz Hussain: Noor's former fiancé (2019)
- Mehul Joseph as Dilruba (A Kinner) : Mirza family's househelp (2019–2020)
- Roslyn D' Souza as Mashuka: Mirza family's househelp (2019–2020)
- Maera Mishra as Saba Mirza: Ayub and Razia's daughter; Azaan's sister; Adil's half-sister; Shayra-Noor's sister-in-law; Ghazala's granddaughter (2019-2020)
- Karan Khanna as Adil Akhtar Mirza: Ayub's son from his second wife; Razia's step-son, Azaan-Saba's half-brother; Ghazala's grandson; Shayra's obsessive lover (2019-2020)
- Shweta Gautam as Safeena: Raj's mother (2019)
- Simar Khaira as main reporter (2019)
- Ahmad Harhash as Raj Begum: Safeena's son (2019–2020)

== Production ==
Bahu Begum was shot in Bikaner.

The series was launched at Bandra in Mumbai.

Speaking about his character, Taneja said, " It’s a very layered character. He is a nice innocent boy who is a nawab. He has that aura and personality. He has come home after studying in London and knows it’s his responsibility to serve the city. Azaan is young, fun-loving but has a slight anger issue."

In October 2019, Mohammed Nazim quit due to his mother's illness.
