= Tu Kahe Agar =

- Genre: Drama
- Directed by: Imitiaz Panjabi
- Starring: See below
- Opening theme: "Tu Kahe Agar" by ?
- Country of origin: India
- Original language: Hindi
- No. of seasons: 1
- No. of episodes: 80

Production
- Producers: Sanjay Kohli and Benaifer Kohli
- Camera setup: Multi-camera
- Running time: Approx. 24 minutes
- Production company: Edit II Productions

Original release
- Network: Zee TV
- Release: 1 April – 15 August 2002

Tu Kahe Agar is an Indian television series that aired on Zee TV based on an astrological prediction that can greatly affect human life. The series premiered on 1 April 2002, and stars Rohit Bakshi Pankit Thakker and Shraddha Nigam in the main leads. It used to air every Monday to Thursday at 10:30pm. It ended on 15 August 2002.

== Cast ==
- Rohit Bakshi as Vishal
- Shraddha Nigam as Maya
- Vineeta Malik as Maya's grandmother
- Malavika Shivpuri
- Pankit Thakker as Karan
- Prachi Thakker
- Yatin Karyekar as Maya's father
- Arun Bali
- Kulbhushan Kharbanda as Vishal's Tauji
- Daya Shankar Pandey
- Arya Rawal
