= Apsara (TV series) =

2026 Indian supernatural fantasy television series

- Genre: Mythological thriller Supernatural
- Created by: Mukta Dhond
- Based on: Samudra Manthan
- Written by: Nikita Dhond; Lyrics: Shashank Kunwar
- Screenplay by: Srinita Bhoumick; Deeptii Rawal; Hitesh Kewalya
- Directed by: Vikram Ghai
- Creative directors: Jaspreet Kaur; Nishtha Yadav
- Starring: Samiksha Jaiswal; Paras Kalnawat; Anushka Merchande; Poorva Gokhale
- Music by: Aashish Rego
- Opening theme: "Apsaraye Hain Hum"
- Country of origin: India
- Original language: Hindi
- No. of seasons: 1
- No. of episodes: 16

Production
- Producers: Mukta Dhond; Nikita Dhond; Milind Dhond
- Editor: Ganga Kacharla
- Camera setup: Multi-camera
- Running time: 20 minutes 45 minutes (for premiere episode)
- Production company: Malhar Content Creations

Original release
- Network: StarPlus
- Release: 21 October 2026 – present

Related
- Divya Drishti

Apsara is an Indian Hindi-language supernatural fantasy television series that airs on Star Plus from 21 October 2026 and streams digitally on JioHotstar. Produced by Mukta Dhond under Malhar Content Creators, it stars Paras Kalnawat, Samiksha Jaiswal, Anushka Merchande and Poorva Gokhale, with Adaa Khan playing a cameo of original form of Gokhale's character.

== Plot ==
The series is based on Apsaras as the divine protector of Amrit, the divine nectar emerged from the Samudra Manthana. The evil Apsara Nirritti's betrayal for the crown and Amrit leads to cursed destruction of Divya Lok, the heavenly abode of Apsaras and forces Meenakshi, the queen to descend on earth with her loyal Apsara friends – Chitralekha and Tillotama to protect rest of young Apsaras and establish a secret Divya Lok. She marries a human, Shashank Bedi and protects their unborn twins who eventually will be able to open gates of the original Divya Lok, become the ultimate protectors of the Amrit and slayers of Nirritti. However, Nirritti kills the couple on the day of Meenakshi's delivery and kidnaps one of the twins Dhaara and raises her after taking the form of a different woman under the identity of Saira Kapoor on earth with her son, Shaurya with an intent to rule Divya Lok after getting them married while a dying Meenakshi orders Chitralekha and Tillotama to get the other twin Sunheri being adopted by Shashank's sister and protect the kids from far away. As the children grow up, the sisters get their powers activated on their twenty first birthday. Sunheri's world crosses path with Shaurya and Nirritti is unaware of the fact that Shaurya fate is destined to be with Sunheri and he is destined to be on her side in her battle against Nirritti to protect Amrit.

== Cast ==
=== Main ===
- Samiksha Jaiswal as Apsara Sunheri Bedi: One of Meenakshi and Shashank's twin daughter (2026–present)
- Paras Kalnawat as Shaurya Kapoor: Saira's son; Diya's brother (2026–present)
- Anushka Merchande as Apsara Dhaara Bedi: One of Meenakshi and Shashank's twin daughter (2026–present)
- Poorva Gokhale as Apsara Nirritti alias Saira Kapoor: Shaurya and Diya's mother; Sunheri's rival (2026–present)

=== Recurring ===
- Leena Jumani as Apsara Chitralekha aka Chitra: Meenakshi's loyal friend and protector of her daughters (2026–present)
- Sangeeta Odwani as Apsara Tillotama: Meenakshi's loyal friend and protector of her daughters (2026–present)
- Priyamboda Singh as Bubbly Bedi: Shashank's sister; Shanky's mother; Sunheri's aunt (2026–present)
- Mohammad Saud Mansuri as Shanky Bedi: Bubbly's son; Sunheri's cousin (2026–present)
- Manik Bedi as Saira's husband; Shaurya and Diya's father (2026–present)
- Veronica Talreja as Diya Kapoor: Saira's step-daughter; Shaurya's half-sister; Nakul's fiance (2026–present)
- Mona Vasu as Anjali Kapoor (2026–present)
- Afzaal Khan as Anjali's husband (2026–present)
- Sanket Ranadive as Viraj (2026–present)
- Mridula Oberoi as Megha Rathore (2026–present)
- Sagar Jashnani as Nakul Rathore: Diya's fiance (2026–present)
- Jiya Solanki
- Subham Tigrania
- Preet Kaur Nayak
- Sailessh Gulabani
- Vishal Arora

=== Special appearance ===
- Avika Gor as Apsara Maharani Meenakshi Bedi: Shashank's wife; Sunheri and Dhaara's mother (2026)
- Manish Raisinghan as Shashank Bedi: Bubbly's brother; Meenakshi's husband; Sunheri and Dhaara's father (2026)
- Adaa Khan as Apsara Nirritti: Divya Lok version of Nirritti; Meenakshi's rival; Shaurya's mother (2026)

== Production ==
=== Development ===
The core premise of the series was inspired from Samudra Manthana.

=== Casting ===
Paras Kalnawat was cast as the male lead. Earlier it was rumoured that Shruti Choudhary, Tanvi Dogra and Ayushi Khurana would play the female lead, but the role went to Samiksha Jaiswal. Anushka Merchande was cast in a prominent role. Avika Gor was cast in a cameo role of queen of Apsaras, marking her return to fiction television after 8 years.

=== Release ===
The first look title teaser was released on 5 August 2026 as AI version. The second promo revealing the presence of Sunehri was released on 27 September 2026. The third promo featuring Jaiswal and Kalnawat, announcing the launch date was released on 5 October 2026. Apsara premiered on 21 October 2026, replacing Kyunki Saas Bhi Kabhi Bahu Thi 2 at 10.30 p.m. slot.

== Reception ==
The show has emerged as the No. 1 daily Hindi General Entertainment Channel (GEC) fiction launch of 2026 on JioHotstar. The show has also recorded the highest watch time among Hindi GEC daily fiction launches on the platform, as a press released by JioStar said.
