= Jagriti: Ek Nayi Subah =

Indian drama television series

- Genre: Drama; Romance
- Created by: Guroudev Bhalla
- Screenplay by: Saima Ahmad
- Story by: Rajesh Saksham
- Starring: Rachana Mistry; Vijayendra Kumeria
- Country of origin: India
- Original language: Hindi
- No. of seasons: 1
- No. of episodes: 481

Production
- Producer: Guroudev Bhalla
- Camera setup: Multi-camera
- Running time: 22 minutes
- Production company: Guroudev Bhalla Productions

Original release
- Network: Zee TV
- Release: 16 September 2024 – 11 January 2026

Jagriti: Ek Nayi Subah (transl. Awakening: A New Dawn) is an Indian Hindi-language television drama series that aired from 16 September 2024 to 11 January 2026 on Zee TV and streams digitally on ZEE5. Produced by Gurodev Bhalla under Guroudev Bhalla Productions, it starred Rachana Mistry and Vijayendra Kumeria in lead roles.

== Plot ==
The show explores themes of social injustice, discrimination, courage, and the pursuit of a better future, revolving around the life of Jagriti, a young girl from the marginalized "Chitta" community in the fictional town of Mokshgarh, Jharkhand. The Chitta community is unjustly branded as 'criminal' from birth by the oppressive and powerful landlord Kalikant Thakur. The community is denied basic rights, including education, and is forced into a life of crime and labor.

The story begins with seven-year-old Jagriti, who bravely questions the injustices faced by her people. She refuses to accept the societal branding and the tyrannical rule of Kalikant Thakur. Her relentless quest for dignity and rights for her community often puts her in conflict with the landlord and his authority.

After a traumatic childhood, Jagriti has been adopted into a wealthy family and has forgotten her past. She has now dedicated herself to becoming an IPS Officer, aspiring to fight for justice and make a difference in society.

In college, Jagriti clashes frequently with Suraj Thakur, the arrogant elder son of powerful landlord Kalikant Thakur. Despite their ongoing rivalry, there's an underlying tension between them. Jagriti, however, falls in love with Akash Thakur, Suraj’s younger brother, and they are set to marry. On the day of the wedding, Sapna, who has loved Akash since childhood, switches places with Jagriti. As a result, Sapna marries Akash, and Jagriti unknowingly marries Suraj.

Shortly after, Akash, enraged by the switch, attempts to force himself on Jagriti, but Suraj intervenes and saves her. This marks a turning point in Jagriti’s perception of Suraj. In the aftermath, as she begins to unravel buried memories, Jagriti gradually rediscovers her true identity and her roots in the Chitta community.

Determined to fight the injustice she was born into, she sets her sights on becoming an IPS officer. Suraj undergoes a dramatic transformation, turning against his corrupt father and becoming Jagriti’s strongest supporter. With his help, she clears the UPSC exam and returns to Mokshgarh as a symbol of justice and reform. Upon her return, Jagriti arrests Kalikant Thakur and presents compelling evidence against him in court. During his transfer to another facility, Kalikant is shot by Akash and falls into a coma, intensifying the conflict.

Over time, the deep bond formed through shared struggle and trust blossoms into love. Jagriti and Suraj fall for each other only after she becomes an IPS officer. When Jagriti is targeted in a bomb attack, Suraj saves her life, cementing their emotional connection. They soon remarry, this time by choice and mutual love.

After their remarriage, Jagriti and Suraj’s relationship faces turmoil when Sapna claims she is pregnant with Suraj’s child. Unknown to others, Akash is the real father and is blackmailing Sapna, threatening to kill the unborn child if she reveals the truth. Jagriti and Suraj eventually uncovers the deception, exposes Akash, and confirms the child’s true paternity. The revelation strengthens their bond and further isolates Akash.

Meanwhile, a major twist unfolds when Kalikant Thakur, previously in a coma, regains consciousness. To regain control over his empire without drawing suspicion, he kills his twin brother, Shashikant, and assumes his identity. Operating from the shadows, Kalikant resumes his manipulation and schemes, further endangering Jagriti’s mission and reigniting conflict in Mokshgarh.

== Cast ==
=== Main ===
- Rachana Mistry as IPS Jagriti "Jaggu" Thakur (née Bahl) — Geeta and Harish's daughter; Bhairav's adopted daughter; Sapna's half-sister; Rohan's adopted sister; Akash's childhood friend and ex-fiancée; Suraj's wife (2025–2026)
  - Asmi Deo as young Jagriti (2024–2025)
- Vijayendra Kumeria as Suraj Thakur: Ganga and Kalikant's elder son; Kalindi's step-son; Akash's brother; Avni and Arjun's half-brother; Sapna's ex-fiancé; Jagriti's husband (2025–2026)
  - Aalok Shaw as young Suraj (2024–2025)

=== Recurring ===
- Aarya Babbar as
  - Kalikant Thakur: Shashikant's twin brother; Ganga and Kalindi's husband; Suraj, Akash, Avni and Arjun's father; Pari's grandfather (2024–2025) (Dead)
  - Dr. Shashikant "Shashi" Thakur: Kalikant's twin brother; Sudha's husband; Jojo's father (2025) (Dead)
- Anjali Banerjee as Ganga Thakur: Kalikant's first wife; Suraj and Akash's mother; Aatish ,Nikita, Avni and Arjun's step-mother; Pari's grandmother (2024–2026)
- Anupama Solanki as Sudha Thakur: Shashikant's widow; Jojo's mother (2025) (Dead)
- Purva Pathak as Jojo Thakur: Sudha and Shashikant's daughter; Suraj, Akash, Aatish, Nikita, Avni and Arjun's cousin (2025–2026)
- Asma Badar as Kalindi Thakur: Kalikant's second wife; Avni and Arjun's mother; Suraj, Akash, Aatish and Nikita's step-mother; Pari's step-grandmother (2025–2026)
  - Revathi Iyer as Young Kalindi (2024–2025)
- Sagar Parekh as Akash Thakur: Ganga and Kalikant's younger son; Kalindi's step-son; Suraj's brother; Avni and Arjun's half-brother; Jagriti's childhood friend and ex-fiancé; Sapna's husband; Pari's father (2025–2026)
  - Harish Kaushal as young Akash (2024–2025)
- Pranjali Singh Parihar as Sapna Thakur: Geeta and Anmol's daughter; Jagriti's half-sister; Suraj's ex-fiancée; Akash's wife; Pari's mother (2025–2026)
  - Siyal Jain as young Sapna (2024-2025)
- Vihaan Thakkar as Arjun Thakur: Kalikant and Kalindi's son; Ganga's step-son; Avni's brother; Suraj and Akash's half-brother (2025–2026)
- Sanchi Singh as Avni Thakur: Kalikant and Kalindi's daughter; Ganga's step-daughter; Arjun's sister; Suraj and Akash's half-sister (2025–2026)
- Vishnu Latawa as Ghungroo: Suraj's best friend (2024–2025) (Dead)
- Muskaan Sharma as Dimple: Sapna's friend (2024)
- Pankti Rathore as Simple: Sapna's friend (2024)
- Prachi Thakur as Kachori: Jagriti's childhood best friend (2025)
- Titiksha Shrivastava as Advocate Geeta Singh: Harish and Anmol's widow; Amar's wife; Jagriti and Sapna's mother; Amitabh's step-mother; Pari's grandmother (2024–2025) / (2025) (Dead)
- Yash Gera as Harish: Geeta's first husband; Jagriti's father (2024–2025) (Dead)
- Vijhay Badlaani as IPS Anmol: Geeta's second husband; Sapna's father; Pari's grandfather (2024–2025) (Dead)
- Unknown as Amar Singh: Geeta's third husband; Amitabh's father (2025)
- Vansh Sayani as Amitabh Singh: An army officer; Amar's son; Geeta's step-son (2025) (Dead)
- Aarti Bhavsar as Bindi: Harish's love-interest; Jagriti and Kachori's mother-figure (2024–2025)
- Himani Sharma as Nanda (2024–2025)
- Prakhar Saxena as Durjan (2024–2025)
- Maahi Kamla as Jhumpa (2024–2025)
- Vishesh Gupta as Raaka (2024–2025)
- Puneet Channa as Ballu (2024–2025)
- Saurabh Agarwal as Bhairav Bahl: Malti's widower; Rohan's father; Jagriti's adoptive father (2025)
- Unknown as Rohan Bahl: Bhairav and Malti's son; Jagriti's adoptive brother; Suman's husband (2025)
- Unknown as Suman Bahl: Rohan's wife; Jagriti's adoptive sister-in-law (2025)
- V S Prince Ratan as Pharmacist (2025)
- Priya Chhaba as Nikita Thakur: Kalikant and Madhu's daughter; Ganga and Kalindi's step-daughter; Aatish's sister; Suraj, Akash, Avni and Arjun's half-sister; Jojo's cousin (2025–2026)
- Inderjeet Modi as Aatish Thakur: Kalikant and Madhu's son; Ganga and Kalindi's step-son; Nikita's brother; Suraj, Akash, Avni and Arjun's half-brother; Jojo's cousin (2025–2026)

== Production ==
=== Casting ===
Namish Taneja was first approached for the role of Suraj but was replaced by Vijayendra Kumeria. In February 2025, the show took a 12-year leap, Akash played by Sagar Parekh, and Suraj played by Vijayendra Kumeria. Aarya Babbar joined the cast, marking his television comeback after 8 year.
