= Pranav Sachdev =

Indian actor

- Born: 12 August 1992 (age 33)
- Occupation: actor

Pranav Sachdev is an Indian actor who graduated from Modern School. He began his career in theater and later joined Hans Raj College to study drama.

Sachdev co-runs a production house called LCM Entertainment, where he has worked on celebrity stage productions, web advertisements, and fictional series.

== Career ==
Pranav Sachdev began his career as a child actor in the TV show Intehaa, which was broadcast on Doordarshan. This was followed by a TV film called Lathi. Later, he acted in various professionally staged plays under the guidance of Raj Upadhyay, and was cast as the lead in the TV show Zindagi Dot Com, directed by Umesh Bist.

He has played a lead role in Hadh, a web original by Vikram Bhatt for Sony Liv and Dilliwood, a web original for the Times Internet. He acted in Unafraid, a crime thriller directed by Vikram Bhatt.

== Appearance ==
=== Television ===
Title	Role
Zindagi Dot Com	Mithlesh
Agar Tum Saath Ho	Ram
Airlines	Kunal
Intehaa	Bunty
Lathi	Asif

=== Web series ===
Title	Role
Hadh	Veer
Dilliwood	Rajbir
Hope	Amit
Maaya 2	Puneet Tandon

=== Stage shows ===
Show	Role
The Makkhichoos (starring Asrani)	Shikhar
Delhiciously Chekhov (starring Tom Alter)	Seducer and Vikram Chadha
Kya Family Hai (starring Asrani)	Ravi
Yeh Jo Mohabbat Hai Na (adaptation of Romeo and Juliet)	Raghav (Romeo)
Firangi Laut aaye	Mohammad khan
Ek tha Gadha urf aladad khan	Nawab
God	Diabeties
Clatta	Bob
The Cellar	Smith
Talaash Arjun ki	Sardar
Desi Babu Videshi Mem	Tailor
Gandhi tum zinda ho	Aftaab
