= Malavika Shivpuri =

Indian actress

- Born: Delhi, India
- Occupations: Actress; voice actress

Malavika Shivpuri is an Indian actress and voice dubbing artiste in Bollywood.

She has acted on Indian television in serials like Tu Kahe Agar, Kyunki Saas Bhi Kabhi Bahu Thi, Choodiyaan, Kahaani Ghar Ghar Kii and Viraasat. She also played a cameo as Sunny Deol's sister in Gadar: Ek Prem Katha.

She has dubbed for Bipasha Basu in Mere Yaar Ki Shaadi Hai and Meera in Nazar besides many other actresses in different films. Her mother Kanika Shivpuri is a character artiste in films and television.

== Dubbing roles ==
=== Animated series ===
Series title	Original voice	Character	Dub language	Original language	Original year release	Dub year release	Notes
Batman: Caped Crusader	Christina Ricci	Selina Kyle/Catwoman	Hindi	English	August 1, 2024	August 1, 2024	Episode: "Kiss of the Catwoman"

=== Live action television series ===
Program title	Actress	Character	Dub Language	Original Language	Episodes	Original airdate	Dubbed airdate	Notes
Adını Feriha Koydum	Deniz Ugur	Sanem İlhanlı	Hindi	Turkish		1/14/2011-6/28/2012	9/15/2015-Ongoing	Airs on Zee Zindagi dubbed in Hindi.
Luke Cage	Rosario Dawson	Claire Temple	Hindi	English		2016–Present		
Lucifer	Lauren German	Detective Chloe Decker	Hindi	English		2016–Present	2019 Present	Dubbed into Hindi and aired on Netflix.
Orange Is The New Black	Laura Prepon	Alex Vause	Hindi	English				

=== Live action films ===
Film title	Actor	Character	Dub Language	Original Language	Original Year release	Dub Year release	Notes
Predators	Alice Braga	Isabelle	Hindi	English	2010	2010	
Ant-Man	Evangeline Lilly	Hope van Dyne	Hindi	English	2015	2015	Performed alongside Sahil Vaid who voiced Paul Rudd as Scott Lang / Ant-Man.
Ant-Man and the Wasp	Evangeline Lilly	Hope van Dyne / Wasp	Hindi	English	2018	2018	
Avengers: Endgame	Evangeline Lilly	Hope van Dyne / Wasp	Hindi	English	2019	2019	
Fast & Furious	Gal Gadot	Gisele Yashar	Hindi	English	2009	2009	
Fast Five	Gal Gadot	Gisele Yashar	Hindi	English	2011	2011	
Fast & Furious 6	Gal Gadot	Gisele Yashar	Hindi	English	2013	2013	
Furious 7	Gal Gadot	Gisele Yashar	Hindi	English	2015	2015	
The Legend of Tarzan	Margot Robbie	Jane Porter Clayton, Lady Greystoke	Hindi	English	2016	2016	Performed along with Sanket Mhatre who voiced Alexander Skarsgård as Tarzan / John Clayton III.
xXx: Return of Xander Cage	Ruby Rose	Adele Wolff	Hindi	English	2017	2017	
Dumb and Dumber To	Kathleen Turner	Fraida Felcher	Hindi	English	2014	2014	
Elysium	Jodie Foster	Defense Secretary Delacourt	Hindi	English	2013	2013	
Real Steel	Evangeline Lilly	Bailey Tallet	Hindi	English	2011	2011	
Flatliners	Nina Dobrev	Marlo	Hindi	English	2017	2017	
The Tomorrow War	Yvonne Strahovski	Vicki winslow	Hindi	English	2021		
K.G.F: Chapter 1	Malavika Avinash	Deepa Hegde	Hindi	Kannada	2018	2018	
K.G.F: Chapter 2	Malavika Avinash	Deepa Hegde	Hindi	Kannada	2021	2021	
Top Gun	Kelly McGillis	Charlotte "Charlie" Blackwood	Hindi	English	1986	2008	Dubbed for a later release.

=== Animated films ===
Film title	Original voice	Character	Dub Language	Original language	Original Year Release	Dub year Release	Notes
Despicable Me 3	Jenny Slate	Valerie Da Vinci	Hindi	English	2017	2017	
