= Pracheen Chauhan =

Indian television actor

- Born: Delhi, India
- Occupation: Actor
- Years active: 2001–2021
- Height: 5 ft 10 in (1.78 m)
- Partners: Archana Taide (2009–2011); Chhavi Pandey (2013–2018)
- Relatives: Pradyumna Chauhan (brother)

Pracheen Chauhan is an Indian television actor.

== Career ==
Pracheen made his television debut with the Star Plus popular show Kasautii Zindagii Kay as Subroto Basu. After that, he did Kuchh Jhuki Palkain, Sinndoor Tere Naam Ka Saat Phere. and Maat Pitaah Ke Charnon Mein Swarg on Colors TV.

He is currently gaining a lot of popularity playing Abhimanyu on YouTube Channel Shitty ideas Trending's (SIT) web series "Pyar Ka Punch" (aka SIT | PKP) SIT Pyar Ka Punch

He has been nominated for Best Actor both across Television and Digital Awards.

== Personal life ==
He converted to buddhism.

== Television ==
Year	Serial	Role	Channel	Co–Star
2001–2002	Kutumb	Tushar Mittal	Sony Entertainment Television	
2002	Love Marriage		Zee TV	
2002–2003	Kuchh Jhuki Palkain	Vansh Khanna	Sony Entertainment Television	Sheetal Shah; Ritu Chaudhary
2002–2005	Kasautii Zindagii Kay	Subroto Basu	Star Plus	Kusumit Sana; Urvashi Dholakia
2003	Ssshhhh...Koi Hai – Vikraal Aur Alkatzar: The Lost City		Star Plus	Ritu Chaudhary
2003–2004	Kyun Hota Hai Pyarrr	Abhi	Star Plus	
2004	Kya Hadsaa Kya Haqeeqat – Kutumb		Sony Entertainment Television	
2005–2007	Sinndoor Tere Naam Ka	Antariksh Raizada	Zee TV	Keerti Gaekwad Kelkar; Gunn Kansara
2006	Twinkle Beauty Parlour Lajpat Nagar		Sony SAB	
2008	Saat Phere – Saloni Ka Safar	Kshitij Singh	Zee TV	Aashka Goradia
2009–2010	Maat Pitaah Ke Charnon Mein Swarg	Shubh Tripathi	Colors TV	Archana Taide; Megha Gupta
2011	Babosa Mere Bhagwan	Changi's Husband	Sony Entertainment Television	Supriya Kumari
2011–2012	Havan	Keerat	Colors TV	Shrenu Parikh
2012	Chhoti Bahu – Sawar Ke Rang Rachi	Krishna	Zee TV	Srishty Rode
2013–2014	The Adventures of Hatim	Hassan	Life OK	
2014	Yeh Hai Aashiqui		Bindass	
2018	Laal Ishq – Maid	Chandar (Episode 29)	&TV	Supriya Kumari
2021	Shaadi Mubarak	Vishal Agarwal	Star Plus	Shweta Gulati
