= Nimisha Pandey =

Indian film director (born 1983)

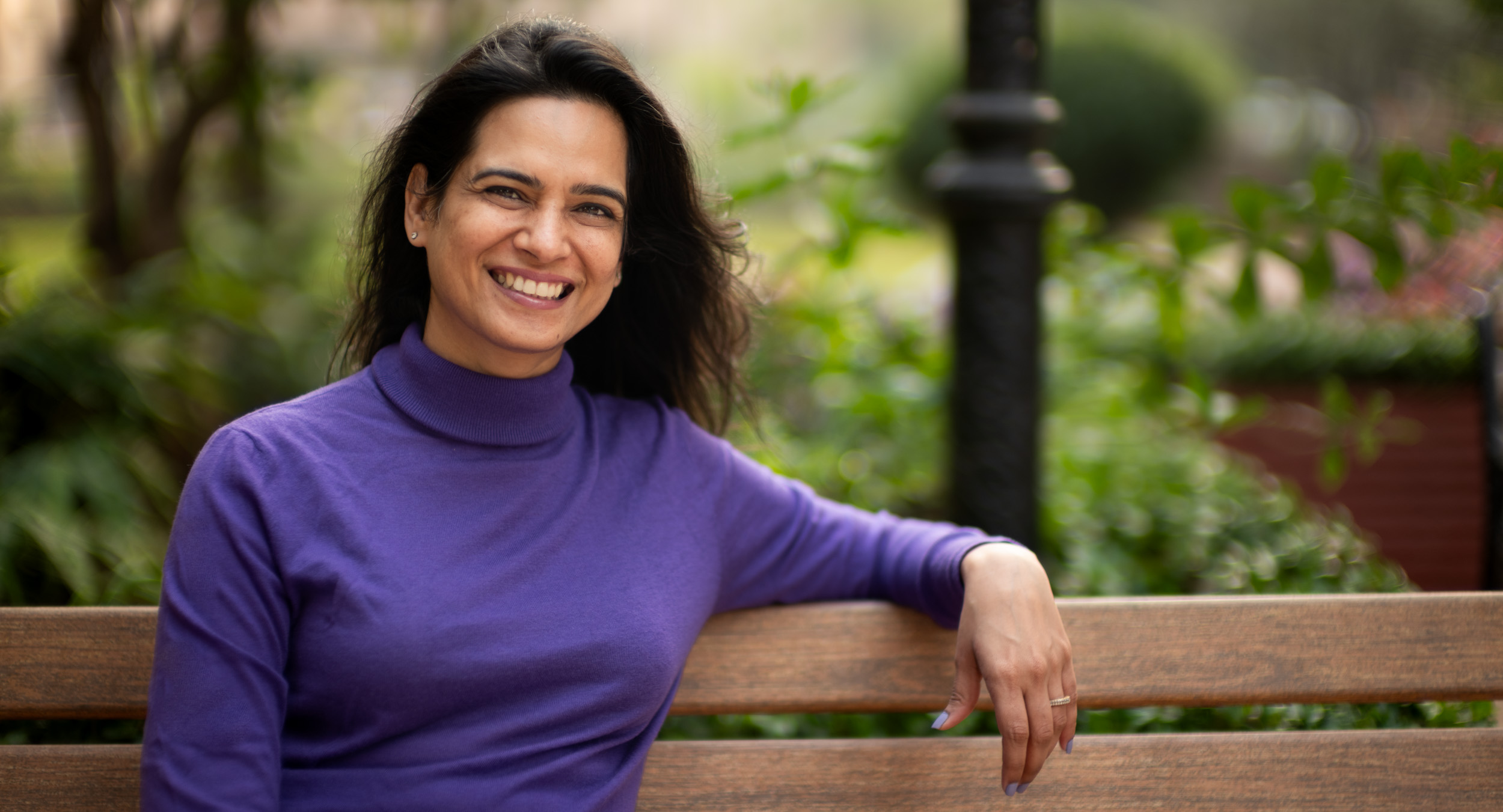
- Born: 27 March 1983 (age 43); Haryana, India
- Occupations: Content director and curator
- Years active: 1999 — present
- Awards: National Award (2004)

Nimisha Pandey is an Indian television and Internet content developer and curator. Born in Haryana and raised in New Delhi, she graduated from the Film and Television Institute of India, Pune in 2004, majoring in television direction. She was the youngest person to receive the National Award, for her short film “Cradle Song” in 2005. Her documentary “Nice Girls” received the Best Documentary Award at the Digital Film Festival, New Delhi in 2006.

Through her career as creative director, Pandey has developed several award-winning, popular and critically acclaimed Indian Television shows including de Humsafars (Sony TV), Pyaar Ko Ho Jaane Do (Sony TV), Qubool Hai (Zee TV), Arjun (TV series) (Star Plus), Shapath (Life OK), Humse Hai Liife (Channel V), Havan (TV series) (Colors TV), Jyoti (NDTV Imagine), Grihasti (Star Plus), Sapno Se Bhare Naina (Star Plus), Ek Ladki Anjaani Is (Sony TV), Kusum (Sony TV), Amber Dhara (Sony TV), Salaam Zindagi (Sony TV).

In 2015, she became head of content for the web platform ALT Balaji Digital Entertainment. Over three years, she was involved in the creation of over 30 popular and critically acclaimed limited-series multi-season shows, making ALT one of India's first and most successful Indian web platforms. The shows included Dev DD, The Test Case (web series), Home, Apharan, Haq Se, Broken, Kehne Ko Humsafar Hain, Karrle Tu Bhi Mohabbat, Boygiri, Romil & Jugal, Fourplay, and Ragini MMS.

Nimisha Pandey worked at from 2018 to 2020 Netflix as Director of International Originals to expand their Indian content. On the 18th of January, 2021, she was appointed as Head of Hindi Originals for Zee5.

Her family consists of her parents, Krishna Kumar Pandey and Nisha Pandey, her brother Nitin Pandey, and her husband Alok Sinha.

== See also ==
- 52nd National Film Awards
