= Kabhi Saas Kabhi Bahu =

Indian comedy television series

- Genre: Comedy
- Created by: Mainframe Entertainment
- Directed by: Rajesh Gupta
- Starring: see below
- Opening theme: "Kabhi Saas Kabhi Bahu"
- Country of origin: India
- Original language: Hindi
- No. of seasons: 1

Production
- Camera setup: Multi-camera
- Running time: 30 minutes

Original release
- Network: DD National
- Release: 2 April 2008 – 2010

Kabhi Saas Kabhi Bahu is a comedy series on DD National channel based on the 3 generations of Awasthi family, whose head Mallu lives with wife Sujata, son Veeru and his wife Hema, grandson Mohit and his wife Kajal. Hema finds herself trapped as she is in the unenviable position of being a Bahu and a Saas at the same time. The show premiered on 2 April 2008.

== Cast ==
- Sushmita Mukherjee as Hema Veerendra Awasthi
- Sonica Handa as Kajal Mohit Awasthi / Kajri Sharma
- Shama Deshpande as Sujata Mallu Awasthi
- Vijay Bhatia as Mohit Awasthi
- Abhijeet Lahiri as Mallu Awasthi
- Iqbal Azad as Veerendra "Veeru" Awasthi
- Shivani Gosain as Shalini
- Mukesh Rawal
