= Palampur Express =

- Created by: Roshan Abbas
- Starring: See below
- Country of origin: India
- Original language: Hindi
- No. of seasons: 1
- No. of episodes: 82

Production
- Executive producers: Roshan Abbas, Ranjit Raina, and Sukrit Singh
- Producer: Mukesh K. Begu
- Editor: Gaurav Meshram
- Camera setup: Multi-camera
- Running time: 24 minutes
- Production company: Encompass Productions

Original release
- Network: Sony Entertainment Television
- Release: 25 May – 28 October 2009

Palampur Express is a Hindi language television series that aired on Sony Entertainment Television from 25 May 2009 till 28 October 2009. The story is based on the life of a young woman, Paavni, dreams of becoming an Olympic runner.

== Cast ==
- Pooja Kanwal / Akanksha Rawat as Pavni Dikshit
- Ajay Chaudhary as Dhruv
- Rajesh Asthana as Ravikant Dikshit
- Amita Udgata as Dadi
- Adaa Khan as Pavni's Best Friend
- Rinku Karmarkar as Sudha
- Anita Kulkarni as Shikha Dikshit
- Hiten Tejwani as Dev Sisodia
- Divya Singh as Mona
- Krutika Desai Khan as Ila Singh
- Tanya Abrol as Paramjeet Kaur
- Tanvi Thakkar as Lavanya Singh
- Tej Sapru as MLA
- Akshat Gupta as Tej
- Nitin as Sarju Dogra
- Yash Gera as Paaji
- Mudit Nayar as Tanmay Bose
