= Vijayendra Kumeria =

Indian television actor (born 1986)

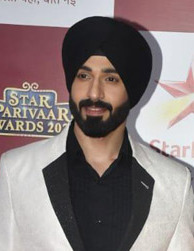
- Kumeria in star parivaar award
- Born: 12 October 1986 (age 40); Ahmedabad, Gujarat, India
- Occupations: Actor; producer
- Years active: 2011–present
- Spouse: Preeti Bhatia (m. 2012; div. 2025)
- Children: 1

Vijayendra Kumeria (born 12 October 1986) is an Indian television actor and television serial producer.

== Personal life ==
Kumeria was born on 12 October 1986. He is a Pujnabi, and his hometown is Ahmedabad..

Kumeria was married to Preeti Bhatia in January 2012. In October 2016, they had a daughter. The couple separated in 2022 and eventually divorced in 2025.

== Career ==
Kumeria quit his civil aviation job after working for years to pursue acting, having convinced his parents.

Initially, he faced rejections while doing rounds in production houses at Mumbai. In 2011, he bagged the role of Jolly Bhardwaj in Chotti Bahu, making his television debut. In 2014 Colors TV's Shastri Sisters got him a lead role opposite Ishita Ganguly.

In October 2019, he established a production house Kumeria Productions with then-wife Preeti.

== Filmography ==
=== Television ===
Year	Serial	Role	Notes	Ref
2011–2012	Chotti Bahu 2	Jolly Bharadwaj	Supporting Role	
2012	The Command Force	Abhinav	Supporting Role	
2012–2013	Aaj Ki Housewife Hai... Sab Jaanti Hai	Uddham Chaturvedi	Supporting Role	
2012–2013	Sukanya Hamari Betiyan	Sohan	Supporting Role	
2013–2014	Pyaar Ka Dard Hai Meetha Meetha Pyaara Pyaara	Sameer Deshpande	Supporting Role	
2014	Tumhari Paakhi	Vikram	Negative Role	
2014–2015	Shastri Sisters	Squadron Leader Rajat Sareen	Lead Role	
2015	Twist Wala Love – Fairy Tales Remixed	Naman	Episodic Role	
2016–2018	Udaan	Suraj Rajvanshi	Lead Role	
2018–2019	Udaan	Raghav Khanna	Lead Role	
2019	Sufiyana Pyaar Mera	Madhav / Krish Sharma	Supporting Role	
2019–2020	Naagin 4	Dev Parekh	Lead Role	
2021	Aapki Nazron Ne Samjha	Darsh Rawal	Lead Role	
2022	Mose Chhal Kiye Jaaye	Armaan Oberoi	Lead Role	
2023–2024	Teri Meri Doriyaann	Angad Singh Brar	Lead Role	
2024–2025	Deewaniyat	Dev Chaudhary	Lead Role	
2025–2026	Jagriti: Ek Nayi Subah	Suraj Thakur	Lead Role	
2026	Juhi Mui	Inspector Sanyam Singh		

==== Guest appearances ====
Year	Show	Role	Notes
2016	Swaragini - Jodein Rishton Ke Sur	Suraj Rajvanshi	Guest
2016	Bigg Boss 10	Suraj Rajvanshi	Guest
2017	Sasural Simar Ka	Suraj Rajvanshi	Guest
2018	Tu Aashiqui	Suraj Rajvanshi	Guest
2018	Ishq Mein Marjawan	Suraj Rajvanshi	Guest
2018	Laado 2 – Veerpur Ki Mardani	Suraj Rajvanshi	Guest
2018	Bepannah	Suraj Rajvanshi	Guest
2019	Bigg Boss 13	Dev Parekh	Guest
2020	Naagin 5	Dev Parekh	Guest
2024	Ghum Hai Kisikey Pyaar Meiin	Dev Chaudhary	
2024	Yeh Rishta Kya Kehlata Hai	Dev Chaudhary	
2025	Chhoriyan Chali Gaon	Suraj Thakur	Guest

=== Producer ===
Year	Serial
2023	Jahan Chaand Rehta Hai
2024–2025	Heer Tey Tedhi Kheer
