= Prachi Kowli =

Indian television actress

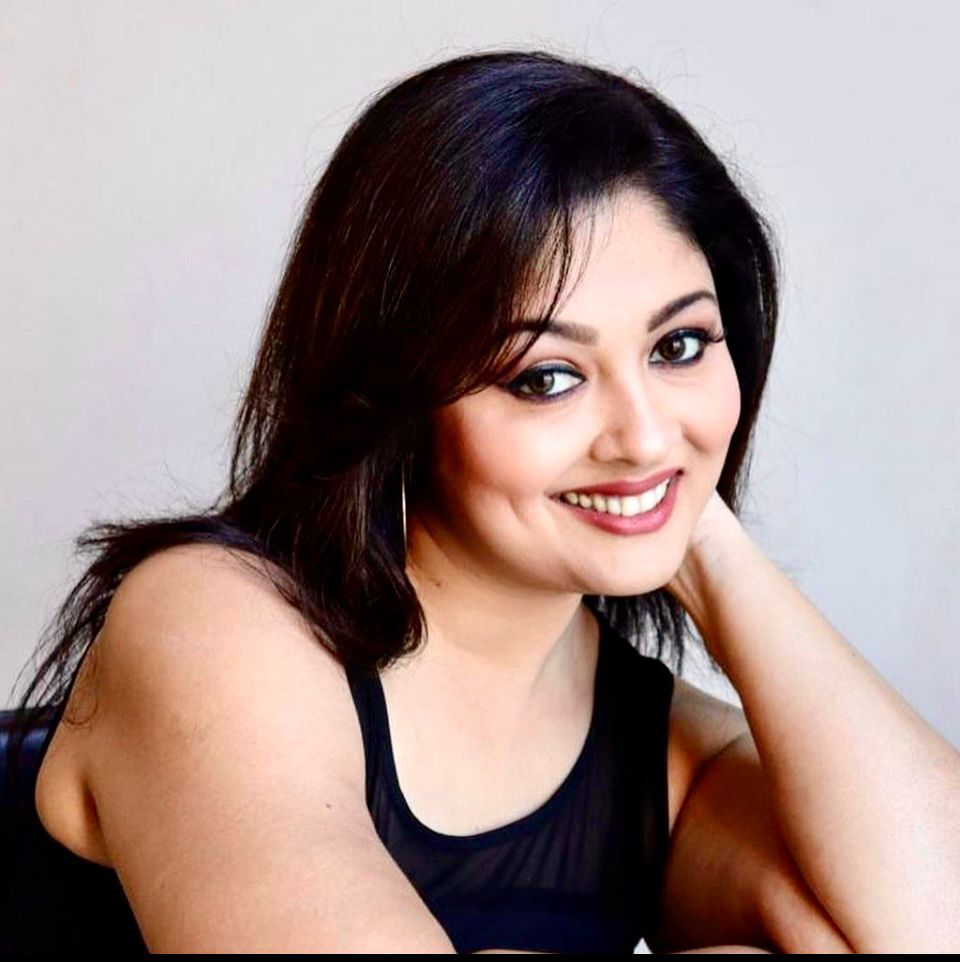
- Born: Prachi Kowli; Mumbai
- Occupation: Actress
- Years active: 2001–present
- Children: 1

Prachi Kowli is a television actress. She started her career with Balaji Telefilms serial Kasautii Zindagii Kay on the Star Plus channel, Tu Kahe Agar by Edit II Productions on Zee TV, Havan by Edit II Productions on Colors TV, Neeli Chatri Waale by Garima Productions on Zee TV.

== Personal life ==
Prachi was born in Dadar West,Mumbai and pursued her education at Elphinstone College.

== Television ==
Year	Title	Role	Notes
2001–2007	Kasautii Zindagii Kay	Rakhi Basu Sengupta	
2002	Kaagaz Ki Kashtii		
2002	Tu Kahe Agar		
2011–2012	Havan	Manjalika	
2015	Neeli Chatri Waale		
2017	Sethji	Devi	
2018–2019	Silsila Badalte Rishton Ka	Sweety Khanna	
2023	Katha Ankahee	Seema Datta	
2023–2024	Aaina - Roop Nahin, Haqeeqat Bhi Dikhaye	Meghna Singh	
2025	Meri Bhavya Life	Uma Agarwal	
2025; 2026	Kyunki Saas Bhi Kabhi Bahu Thi 2	Pooja Virani	
2026; 2026–present	Kyunki Rishton Ke Bhi Roop Badalte Hain	Pooja Virani	

== Awards ==
=== Nominations ===
- ITA Award 2002 - Best Actress in Supporting Role as Rakhhi Sen Gupta for Kasautii Zindagii Kay
- Indian Telly Award 2002 - Best Actress in Supporting Role as Rakhhi Sen Gupta for Kasautii Zindagii Kay
- ITA Award 2003 - Best Actress in Supporting Role as Rakhhi Sen Gupta for Kasautii Zindagii Kay
