= Meri Bhavya Life =

Indian social issue series

- Genre: Social issue
- Created by: Sunjoy Waddhwa
- Starring: Prisha Dhatwalia; Karan Vohra; Prachi Kowli; Sheetal Maulik; Kushagre Dua
- Country of origin: India
- Original language: Hindi
- No. of seasons: 1
- No. of episodes: 94

Production
- Producers: Sunjoy Waddhwa; Comall Sunjoy W.
- Production location: Bhopal
- Camera setup: Multi-camera
- Running time: 25-31 minutes
- Production company: Sphere Origins

Original release
- Network: Colors TV
- Release: 30 April – 1 August 2025

Meri Bhavya Life is an Indian Hindi-language television social issue series which aired from 30 April 2025 to 1 August 2025 on Colors TV and streams digitally on JioHotstar. Produced by Sphere Origins and starring Prisha Dhatwalia and Karan Vohra. It is an official remake of Marathi TV series Sundara Manamadhe Bharli.

== Plot ==
Bhavya is a warm-hearted and intelligent girl brimming with optimism. She is a perfect daughter, sister, and friend. Despite her seemingly ideal life, she has faced several rejections in marriage alliances due to her obesity. Her path crosses with Rishank, the son of her father's best friend, a fitness enthusiast who wants everyone to be healthy.

== Cast ==
=== Main ===
- Prisha Dhatwalia as Bhavya Agarwal Jaiswal: Uma and Vinay's daughter; Nupur's sister; Rishank's wife; Nitin & Sakshi's daughter-in-law; Samay's sister-in-law
  - Aarna Bhadoriya as Child Bhavya Agarwal
- Karan Vohra as Rishank Jaiswal: Sakshi and Nitin's son; Bhavya's husband; Samay's half-brother

=== Recurring ===
- Hiten Tejwani as Nitin Jaiswal: Priyal's brother; Sakshi's husband; Rishank and Samay's father
- Khyaati Keswani as Sakshi Jaiswal: Nitin's wife; Rishank's mother; Samay's stepmother
- Iqbal Azad as Vinay Agarwal: Rama's brother; Uma's husband; Bhavya and Nupur's father
- Prachi Kowli as Uma Agarwal: Vinay's wife; Bhavya and Nupur's mother
- Sheetal Maulik as Priyal Jaiswal: Nitin's sister; Rishank's aunt
- Kruttika Desai as Damayanti Thakur: Nitin's aunt
- Akshita Tiwari as Nupur Agarwal: Vinay and Uma's daughter; Bhavya's sister
- Disha Savla as Rama Agarwal: Vinay's sister; Bhavya and Nupur's aunt
- Kushagre Dua as Akshay
- Shubhang Chaturvedi as Abhishek Kumar
- Moksha Zilpe as Pari
- Unknown as Rhea: Rishank's ex-lover
- Dolphin Dwivedi as Shanti Kumar; Nitin's ex-lover; Samay's mother; Damayanti's partner in crime (Dead)
- Prateek Soni as Sameer: a man whose marriage was arranged with Bhavya
- Junaid Ahmad as Sameer's father
- Imran Nazir Khan as Samay Jaiswal: Nitin and Shanti's Illegitimate son; Rishank's half-brother; Sakshi's stepson; Bhavya's brother-in-law

== Production ==
=== Development ===
Talking about the show, which addresses the social issue of body shaming faced by overweight women, producer Sunjoy Waddhwa said, "The show is about how today’s generation deals with issues that they personally don’t see as problems, but society does. The story revolves around a confident young woman who is overweight, but doesn’t see her weight as a limitation. But she is body shamed in society and her weight becomes an issue when it comes to getting married or at her workplace. Being overweight is not an issue but fat shaming is toxic and quite common in India."

=== Release ===
In late December 2024, Colors TV unveiled a teaser introducing the new show titled Meri Bhavya Life, featuring Prisha Dhatwalia. The second promo was released in March 2025. The third promo was released on 23 April 2025 featuring Bollywood actress Sonakshi Sinha promoting the series.

=== Casting ===
Hiten Tejwani was roped in as Nitin Jaiswal. Sheetal Maulik was cast as Priyal Jaiswal.
