= Krishna Chali London =

Indian television series

- Genre: Drama
- Created by: Saurabh Tewari
- Screenplay by: Pranjal Saxena; Shashank Kunwar
- Story by: Amitabh Singh Ramkshatra; Srinita Bhoumick
- Directed by: Sachin Kannan; Rahib Siddiqui; Manchan Thakur Vikal
- Creative directors: Ketaki Walawalkar; Mini Sunita Pramod; Ishita Rana
- Starring: Megha Chakraborty; Gaurav Sareen; Karan Vohra
- Music by: Pancham Singhania; Rishabh Singhania
- Country of origin: India
- Original language: Hindi
- No. of seasons: 1
- No. of episodes: 281

Production
- Producers: Saurabh Tewari; Sumit Chaudhuri; Kewal Sethi; Deepak Gurnani
- Cinematography: Kunal B. Kadam
- Editors: Rahul Singh; Jatish Narayan Ghadi
- Camera setup: Multi-camera
- Running time: 22 minutes
- Production company: Parin Multimedia

Original release
- Network: StarPlus
- Release: 21 May 2018 – 14 June 2019

Krishna Chali London is an Indian television drama series on Star Plus. It aired from 21 May 2018 to 14 June 2019. The series starred Megha Chakraborty, Gaurav Sareen and Karan Vohra.

== Plot ==
Radhe Lal Shukla lives in Kanpur, Uttar Pradesh and belongs to a rich yet illiterate family. Humiliated for his illiteracy, his dominating and arrogant non-biological father Gajodhar chooses district-topper Krishna Dubey as his bride from the neighboring town of Malihabad.

Intelligent and ambitious, Krishna assists her father at his medical clinic. Her mother had died of cervical cancer. Krishna dreams of studying medicine in London and becoming a doctor, but still marries Radhe for her father's reputation. She is humiliated by the Shukla family members who resent her for independent thoughts and modern views.

However, Radhe supports Krishna. Gradually, she falls in love with him and brings some positive changes into the Shukla household. It is revealed that Radhe is Gajodhar's brother Lambodar's son. Lambodar had murdered his wife Vrinda (Radhe's mother, who tried to save Gajodhar's wife Raima from Lambodar's unwanted sexual advances).

Lambodar is imprisoned. Radhe and Krishna leave for London. In medical school, Krishna is punished by stern and arrogant NRI professor Dr. Veer Sahay, a famous clinical cardiologist whose native city is Unnao. Veer is expelled from his job for racist behaviour. His car hits Radhe, who dies in the accident.

The Shuklas promptly blame Krishna for Radhe's death and mistreat her. Emotionally broken, Krishna is forced to stay with the Shuklas who had recently opened a special hospital named Radhe Krishna Hospital where she must now work. Meanwhile, Lambodar tries to escape from prison and is hospitalised.

Veer returns to India. His past turns out to be connected to Shuklas. His father Sharad worked for Gajodhar who refused to lend him money for an important surgery which eventually led to Sharad's death. Veer harbours a deep grudge against Shuklas. He and Krishna are forced to run the Radhe Krishna Hospital, slowly fall in love and marry.

Veer buys the Radhe Krishna Hospital at an auction and gifts it to Krishna. Gajodhar manipulates Krishna that Veer killed Radhe and was faking his love for her. Veer gets ten years imprisonment for Radhe's murder. Heartbroken, Krishna returns the hospital to Gajodhar and leaves for London to complete medical school.

=== Five years later ===
Krishna is now an honest and sincere professional doctor working at the Life Care Hospital. Gajodhar asks her to work in his hospital for his business growth, but she rejects the offer. Veer escapes from prison to meet Krishna and pleads his innocence but is soon captured and sent back to prison.

A mysterious man convinces an emotional Raima and her son Gajanan that he is Radhe. Veer's mother Sunaina wants Gajodhar to bail Veer out as "Radhe" has now returned. Veer is bailed and investigates the actual identity of new Radhe. Veer and Krishna discover that the new Radhe is actually Mohan who is defrauding the family.

Soon, the Shuklas realise that they were being duped by Mohan. They are grateful to Veer and Krishna for exposing him. Veer and Krishna reject an appointment letter from the London Royal Hospital to stay back in Kanpur with the Shukla family who give them their blessings.

== Cast ==
=== Main ===
- Megha Chakraborty as Dr. Krishna Sahay (née Dubey; formerly Shukla) : Clinical cancer specialist; Kaksh Nath's daughter; Nirmal and Gulkand's niece; Radhe's widow; Veer's wife (2018–2019)
- Gaurav Sareen as Radhe Shukla: Lambodar and Vrinda's son; Gajodhar and Raima's adopted son and nephew; Gajanan, Triloki and Jhabbo's cousin; Krishna's first husband (2018–2019) (Dead)
  - Mohan Mehta: After Plastic Surgery (2019)
- Karan Vohra as Dr. Veer Sahay: Clinical cardiology specialist; Sunaina and Kailash's son; Nayani's brother; Krishna's second husband (2018–2019)

=== Recurring ===
- Vividha Kirti as Shivani Singh: Veer's ex girlfriend
- Neeraj Sood as Dr. Kaksh Nath Dubey: Gulkand's brother; Krishna's father
- Sushmita Mukherjee as Gulkand Saneria: Kaksh Nath's sister; Nirmal's wife; Krishna's paternal aunt
- Pawan Mahendru as Nirmal Saneria: Gulkand's husband; Krishna's paternal uncle
- Yamini Singh as Sunaina Sahay: Kailash's widow; Veer and Nayani's mother
- Aaira Rajput as Nayani Sahay: Sunaina and Kailash's daughter; Veer's sister
- Anupam Shyam as Lambodar Shukla: Gajodhar's brother; Vrinda's murderer and widower; Radhe's father; Gajanan, Triloki and Jhabbo's paternal uncle
- Bhagwan Tiwari as Gajodhar Shukla: Lambodar's brother; Raima's husband; Gajanan, Triloki and Jhabbo's father; Radhe's paternal uncle
- Madhuri Sanjeev as Raima Shukla: Gajodhar's wife; Gajanan, Triloki and Jhabbo's mother; Radhe's paternal aunt
- Ishaan Singh Manhas as Prashant Jaisingh: Krishna's former boyfriend and mentor
- Sunny Sachdeva as Gajanan Shukla: Gajodhar and Raima's son; Triloki and Jhabbo's brother; Krishna's cousin brother; Laali's husband
- Divya Malik as Lakshika "Laali" Shukla: Gajanan's wife
- Manoj Verma as Triloki Shukla: Gajodhar and Raima's son; Gajanan and Jhabbo's brother; Krishna's cousin brother; Bela's husband
- Bhoomika Mirchandani as Bela Shukla (née Awasthi): Sahira's daughter; Titi's sister; Triloki's wife
- Piew Jana as Jhabbo Mishra (née Shukla): Gajodhar and Raima's daughter; Gajanan and Triloki's sister; Krishna's cousin sister; Matuk's wife
- Amitabh Singh Ramkshatra as Matuk Nath Mishra: Jhabbo's husband
- Meena Mir as Sahira Awasthi: Bela and Titi's mother
- Shivanya Ahlawat as Tinakshi "Titi" Awasthi - Sahira's daughter; Bela's sister
- Abhinandan Jindal as Saajan Srivastav: Radhe's best friend and confidante; Guddan's husband
- Kaushiki Rathore as Guddan Srivastav: Saajan's wife
- Ankit Bathla as Dr. Aayan Kapoor: Clinical oncology specialist
- Mayank Arora as Mohan Mehta
- Babla Kochhar as Dr. Shrikant Rao: a psychiatrist

=== Special appearances ===
- Saurabh Tewari as himself during episode 1 (2018)
- Mouni Roy as Sundari (2018)

== Production ==
Both the leads not hailing from backdrop of the series Kanpur, went on training to learn the accent and slang used there. Speaking about training for his role, lead Gaurav Sareen said, "The part that required most effort for the role was the language. Since I was born and brought up in Amritsar, I have a Punjabi accent, which was unfit for Radhe, who is from Kanpur. I read a lot of books and watched movies in the languages spoken in and around eastern Uttar Pradesh." Megha Chakraborty who attended diction classes for it said, "I am from Kolkata and I am not well-versed with the Hindi language. When I was approached for the show, my character required me to learn a local dialect of Uttar Pradesh, which is very close to the Hindi language. Because of my difficulty with the dialect, I took classes from the on-set tutor and improved on my language skills. It took me a few days initially but I got better in a few months."

Based on the backdrop of Kanpur, the series was mainly filmed at sets in Mumbai. However, some initial sequences were shot at Lucknow. From late December 2018 to early January 2019, the series was filmed at London.

In July 2018, a fire broke out on the sets while some clothes caught fire which was soon extinguished.

In early January 2019, to increase the ratings, Sareen was made to quit the series when his character was killed in a car accident in London which he was informed the day before shooting the sequence. Karan Vohra who was cast as Veer in December 2018 became the lead then.

== Adaptations ==
It was remade in Kannada as Nan Hendthi MBBS, which premiered on Star Suvarna on 11 February 2019 and ended on 18 May 2019 with 82 episodes due to low viewership. The series was based on the backdrop of Melkote which starred Sagar and Divya Rao.

== Reception ==
The series opened with a low viewership of 2.7 million viewership in its launch week in urban occupying eighteen position. However, then it improved to a satisfactory level. In third week of August 2018, it occupied tenth position garnering 5.08 million viewership. In week 41 of 2018 it was in ninth position with 4.6 million impressions. In week 43 of 2018, it was in fourteenth position with 4.9 million impressions. In week 51 of 2018 it garnered 5.1 million impressions occupying fourteenth position and the following week it got 4.08 million impressions.

With its decent average ratings, it maintained its position in weekly top twenty Hindi GEC in urban since its premiere until December 2018. To increase the ratings, in January 2019, the makers killed the character Radhe played by Gaurav Sareen and Karan Vohra playing Veer became the main lead opposite Megha Chakraborty. This saw a decline in its ratings during which in week 2 2019 it did not even feature in top 40 Hindi GEC in urban. In week 5 2019, it occupied lowest position with 0.8 million impressions.

In UK, during the week ending 24 March 2019, it became the most watched Hindi television series with 107,700 viewership.

With the not expected ratings delivered by the series, it was ended on 14 June 2019 with the decreasing ratings and it garnered a low TRP of 1.1 in its last week of airing.
