= Ardhangini (2017 TV series) =

Indian television series (2017–2018)

- অৰ্ধাঙ্গিনী
- Genre: Family, drama, romance
- Created by: Hamid Ullah
- Screenplay by: Rintu M. Bora, Smrita Bora
- Story by: Nabjyoti Bora
- Directed by: Rupkamal Hazarika
- Starring: Preety Kongana; Amit Kumar Borah
- Opening theme: "Ardhangini" by Pompi Gogoi
- Country of origin: India
- Original language: Assamese
- No. of seasons: 1
- No. of episodes: 239

Production
- Producers: Hamid Ullal, Sunti Choudhary
- Camera setup: Single camera
- Running time: approx. 20-22 minutes
- Production company: K.B Production

Original release
- Network: Rang
- Release: 17 July 2017 – 21 April 2018

Ardhangini (the better half) was an Assamese-language drama series that was produced by Hamid Ullal under K.B production. It premiered on 17 July 2017 on Rang TV. It stars Preety Kongana and Amit Kumar Borah.

== Plot ==
Ardhangini is a story of two identical twin sisters who belong to a conservative family. Their father being the head master of a school and mother a perfect home maker holds a very good impression in the society. Like any household, the father highly holds the prestige and pride of his family However, not everyone of the family holds the same regard like the father. The two sisters having immense love and care for each other grew old to have some different characteristics. The elder one is a responsible and family oriented girl. the younger one is totally opposite she becomes more selfish and introvert. The story takes a twist when the younger sister runs away with the fiancé of her elder sister on her wedding day leaving a note for the family. Reading the note the elder sister decides to sacrifice every thing in order to protect the pride of the family and marries the groom of her younger sister. No one could know the truth since the sisters were identical. Now the story further illustrates the comparative life struggle between the two sisters on how the elder sister tries to become someone else sacrificing her own identity and her own wishes.

== Cast ==
- Preety Kongana as Gungun (younger sister) and Runjun (elder sister)
- Amit Kumar Borah as Mrittick Choudhary
- Guna Borah as Emon
- Sharanga Bordoloi as Palash and Pallab
- Zule Ekka as Kaveri
- Paban as Kaveri's husband
- Shilpi as Kaveri and Paban's daughter
- Upamanyu as Mrittick's cousin
- Debojit Mazumdar as Prabhat Bora
- Parijat, Palash's younger sister
- Nila Saikia as Malaya Choudhary
- Kajol Sharma as Sharmila
- Nilakshi Saikia as Nilakshi Devi

== Location ==
Ardhangini was mainly shot in Guwahati. Locations like Guwahati and Nagaon are referred in the serial.

== See also ==
- Bharaghar
