= Samiksha Jaiswal =

Indian television actress

- Occupation: Actress
- Years active: 2016–present
- Known for: Zindagi Ki Mehek; Ram Bhavan

Samiksha Jaiswal is an Indian actress who primarily works in Hindi television.

== Career ==
Jaiswal made her television debut in 2016 with Zee TV's Zindagi Ki Mehek portraying Mehek Sharma. In 2019, she played Noor Hassan Qureshi in Colors TV's Bahu Begum. In 2022, she playing Sugandha Singh in Dangal TV's Control Room.

From January 2025 to July 2025, she returns to television after 3 years hiatus played Gayatri Vajpayee in Colors TV's Ram Bhavan. Since October 2026, she was signed Sunehri in StarPlus's Apsara.

== Filmography ==
=== Television ===
Year	Title	Role	Notes	Ref.
2016–2018	Zindagi Ki Mehek	Mehek Khanna (née Sharma)	Double role	
2018	Zindagi Ki Mehek	Mehek Ahlawat (née Singh Mann)	Double role	
2018	Juzz Baat	Herself	Guest appearance	
2019–2020	Bahu Begum	Noor Hassan Qureshi/Begum Noor Mirza		
2022	Control Room	Sugandha Singh		
2025	Ram Bhavan	Gayatri Vajpayee		
2026–present	Apsara	Apsara Sunheri Bedi		

=== Music videos ===
Year	Title	Singer(s)	Ref.
2016	Pehli Dafa	Dhaval Kothari	

== See also ==
- List of Hindi television actresses
