= Tedi Medi Family =

- Genre: Comedy
- Created by: Mautik Tolia
- Based on: The Middle
- Directed by: Neelesh Ambekar
- Starring: See below
- Country of origin: India
- Original language: Hindi
- No. of seasons: 1
- No. of episodes: 52

Production
- Producer: Mautik Tulip
- Production locations: Mumbai, Maharashtra, India
- Camera setup: Single-camera
- Running time: 22 minutes
- Production company: Bodhi Tree Productions

Original release
- Network: BIG Magic
- Release: 8 June 2015 – 2015

Tedi Medi Family is an Indian sitcom television series, which premiered on 8 June 2015 and is broadcast on BIG Magic. The series is an adaptation of Warner Bros.' The Middle.

Reliance Broadcast Network had acquired the adaptation rights of the series. The series is produced by Mautik Tulip of Bodhi Tree Productions. The series is about a working-class family. The series is produced as a single-camera comedy and follows the daily commotion of raising a family, in the middle of life.

== Cast ==
- Iqbal Azad as Vivek Khurana
- Ami Trivedi as Anjali Khurana
- Sushant Mohindru as Shanky Khurana
- Saloni Daini as Suhani Khurana
- Dharmik Joisar as Veer Khurana
- Manav Soneji as Vicky
- Varun Badola as Vivek's friend
- Shefali Rana as Badi Massi
