= Aaj Ki Raat Hai Zindagi =

2015 Indian talk show

- Inter-title
- Genre: Talk show
- Created by: Uday Shankar
- Based on: Tonight's the Night
- Presented by: Amitabh Bachchan
- Starring: Amitabh Bachchan; Kapil Sharma; Sanaya Irani; Nandish Singh; Karishma Tanna; Alia Bhatt
- Country of origin: India
- Original language: Hindi
- No. of seasons: 1
- No. of episodes: 13

Production
- Producer: Uday Shankar
- Production locations: Mumbai, Maharashtra, India
- Editors: Online Editor(s); Jasveer Jatia; Amitabh Bachchan; Uday Shankar
- Camera setup: Multi-camera
- Production company: BBC Worldwide India

Original release
- Network: STAR Plus
- Release: 18 October 2015 – 10 January 2016

Aaj Ki Raat Hai Zindagi (transl. Today's Night Is the Life) is an Indian entertainment talk show which premiered on 18 October 2015 and was broadcast on STAR Plus. The series revolved around common people who have accomplished something extraordinary. Every episode of the show featured Bollywood celebrities, who were invited by the host of the show. The series was hosted by Amitabh Bachchan. Due to low TRPs, the series was last aired on 10 January 2016.

Development began in September 2015, when Uday Shankar, CEO of STAR Plus, announced his plan to make an Indian version of the British TV series Tonight's the Night. The series received average reviews; one critic said, "Bachchan's show has a good concept but bad packaging", while another said "The concept is beautiful and Amitabh Bachchan is fabulous".

== Format ==
Aaj Ki Raat Hai Zindagi presented the journey of people, who, against all odds, helped improve society and were an inspiration for others to change their outlook. The host invited Bollywood celebrities to give a gift to everyday heroes who had helped others. The series brought forth and celebrated unsung heroes who were selfless in their endeavors, who were then given a gift by the invited celebrity.

== Guests ==
Guests on the show included Dharmendra, Sunny Deol, Shilpa Shetty, Mohit Chauhan, Parineeti Chopra, Alia Bhatt, Maryam Siddiqui and Kapil Sharma. Popular television actresses Sanaya Irani & Rashami Desai made an appearances.

== Development and production ==
In September 2015, Uday Shankar, CEO of STAR Plus, had the idea to create an Indian version of the British TV series Tonight's the Night. The series was titled as Aaj Ki Raat Hai Zindagi and was aimed to showcase common people who had accomplished something extraordinary. Shankar invited Amitabh Bachchan to host Aaj Ki Raat Hai Zindagi; he accepted. Bachchan said, "I got an invitation from the channel to do this show and I liked it." Shankar said that Aaj Ki Raat Hai Zindagi will "not only entertain but also inspire individuals and leave them with a reason to smile". Having collaborated with Bachchan on Kaun Banega Crorepati, Shankar said, "We have once again collaborated with the biggest superstar of the country Amitabh Bachchan for a unique project on Indian television." In October 2015, Hussain Kuwajerwala was finalized to co-host the series along with Bachchan. He said, "It was my birthday on Monday and on Tuesday, I started shooting with him. There couldn’t have been a better birthday gift for me."

Before the premiere of the series, Bachchan was nervous wondering how the audience would react to the show. He said, "[...] the apprehensions of its receiving or rejection are foremost in the mind."

The series premiered on 18 October 2015, on STAR Plus, and was broadcast on Sundays. Every episode featured leading Bollywood celebrities who were invited to gift something to everyday heroes who have helped others in some way. Alia Bhatt and Shilpa Shetty were the first guests to appear on the show. Being a finite series, it aired its last episode on 10 January 2016 due to low TRPs with a total of 13 episodes. A source told Mid-Day said, "The channel had great expectations from the show [...] However, the plummeting TRPs prove that it has not been able to engage the audience."

== Reception ==
Aaj Ki Raat Hai Zindagi earned average reviews from critics. Shruti Kapoor of India Today in her review called the series "quite different from Tonight's the Night". She said, "Bachchan's show has a good concept but bad packaging." However, she praised Bachchan's hosting and said, "The only saving grace of the show is Big B himself." Tista Sengupta of Rediff.com in her review, called the series "Inspiring but not so impressive". In addition, she said, "The concept is beautiful and Amitabh Bachchan is fabulous. But Aaj Ki Raat Hai Zindagi still doesn't get it right." Rajyasree Sen of Live Mint in her review said, "This is not high entertainment from any angle, but it’s a show worth watching simply because it’s such a pleasant change to hear happy and inspiring real-life stories about people making a difference. " She encouraged readers to tune in and watch it.
