= 2015 in Indian television =

The following is a list of events affecting 2015 in Indian television.

== Television series debuts ==
- Aadhe Adhoore
- Aaj Ki Raat Hai Zindagi
- Aponjon
- Ishq Ka Rang Safed
- Piya Rangrezz
- Rukawat Ke Liye Khed Hai

== Television series endings ==
- 2025 Jaane Kya Hoga Aage
- Humsafars
- Jai Jai Jai Bajrang Bali
- Laut Aao Trisha
- Aahat (Indian TV series)

== Television seasons ==
- Jhalak Dikhhla Jaa (season 8)
- MTV Love School
- MTV Roadies (season 12)

== Channels ==
Launches:

- 8 April: Sony Kix

== See also ==
- Category:2015 Indian television series debuts
