= Agar Tum Saath Ho =

2016 Indian TV series

- Genre: Drama
- Directed by: Deepak Sharma
- Opening theme: Ni main Jogan ho chaliya by Manisha Chakravarty and Romy
- Country of origin: India
- Original language: Hindi
- No. of seasons: 1
- No. of episodes: 150

Production
- Producer: Gulshan Sachdeva
- Running time: 30 minutes (including commercial breaks)

Original release
- Network: Zindagi
- Release: 3 October 2016 – 25 March 2017

Agar Tum Saath Ho is an Indian television series aired on Zindagi from 16 October 2016 to 25 March 2017.

== Plot ==
Neema and Ravi, who belong to two completely different worlds in the society of Delhi. Neema, the daughter of an affluent and caring father, falls in love with a simple middle-class boy Ravi and marries him against her father's wishes. However, her over-protective father showers luxuries on his daughter on his own accord. His constant interference brings in misunderstandings and differences between the couple to the extent that they consider parting ways. Will class differences and an opposing father destroy the relationship? Or will their love prove stronger against all odds?

== Cast ==
- Vinay Rajput as Shekhar
- Ritu Barmecha as Neema: Ravi's Wife
- Hitesh Bharadwaj as Ravi: Neema's Husband
- Udit Ohri as Kapil
- Kamal Tewari as Kamal Bharadwaj (Neema's Father)
- Sabina Mehta Jaitley as Sanjana Bharadwaj (Neema's Mother)
- Sarah Hashmi as Reema (Neema's Sister)
- Dolly Ahluwalia as Darshita Bharadwaj (Neema's Aunt)
- Pranav Sachdev as Ram
- Aziz Qureshi as Professor Waqar
- Gurvinder Singh as Bunty
- Rajat Verma as Chandan (Ravi's Brother)
- Rajshree Seem as Ravi's Mother
- Vimi Mehta as Preeto ji
- Simran Kaur as Jasbir
- Radha Bhatt As Zeba
