= List of programmes broadcast by Zee TV =

Programs broadcast by Indian TV channel

This is a list consisting of current and former broadcasts by the Indian television channel Zee TV.

== Currently broadcast ==
Premiere date	Show	Ref.
16 September 2024	Vasudha	
7 July 2025	Tumm Se Tumm Tak	
22 September 2025	Ganga Mai Ki Betiyan	
10 November 2025	Jagadhatri	
12 January 2026	Lakshmi Niwas	
15 June 2026	Tu Hi Re Dil Mein	
24 August 2026	Dilo Ki Ram Leela	
14 September 2026	Sa Re Ga Ma Pa 2026	

== Formerly broadcast ==
=== Acquired series ===
Year	Show	Ref.
2020	Baarish	
2020	Karrle Tu Bhi Mohabbat	
2020	Kehne Ko Humsafar Hain	
2020	Queen	
2021	Zindagi Gulzar Hai	

=== Anthology series ===
Year	Show	Ref.
1999–2001	Rishtey	
1997–1999	Saturday Suspense	
1993–1995	Yule Love Story	
1999	Gubbare	

=== Children/teen series ===
Year	Show	Ref.
2004–2005	Chi and Me	
1998–2001	Hip Hip Hurray	
1992	Junglee Toofan Tyre Puncture	

=== Comedy series ===
Year	Show	Ref.
2001	Aasman Say Tapki	
2001	Apun To Bas Vaise	
1995	Baat Ban Jaaye	
2013	Bh Se Bhade	
2017	Bin Kuch Kahe	
1998	Dam Dama Dam	
2001	Devrani Jethani	
2014	Gangs of Haseepur	
1997–1998	Ghar Jamai	
1998–1999	Gudgudee	
1999–2000	Hello Friends	
2000	Hotel Hindustan	
1998–1999	Hudd Kar Di	
1995–2005	Hum Paanch	
2004	Hum Sab Baraati	
2006	Johny Aala Re	
2005–2006	Kabhi Haan Kabhi Naa	
2004–2005	Kareena Kareena	
2002–2003	Kitne Kool Hai Hum	
2000	Little Mirchi Thoda Pepper	
1997	Mrs. Madhuri Dixit	
2014–2016	Neeli Chatri Waale	
1999–2000	Professor Pyarelal	
2001	Yeh Hai Mumbai Meri Jaan	
2021	Zee Comedy Show	

=== Drama series ===
Year	Show	Ref.
2009–2010	12/24 Karol Bagh	
1997–1998	9 Malabar Hill	
2002–2003	Aa Gale Lag Jaa	
2012–2013	Aaj Ki Housewife Hai... Sab Jaanti Hai	
2003–2004	Aandhi	
1999–2003	Aangan	
2018–2019	Aap Ke Aa Jane Se	
2009–2010	Aapki Antara	
1998–2001	Aashirwad	
1999	Aashiqui	
2002–2003	Aati Rahengi Baharein	
1996–1999	Adhikar	
2011–2012	Afsar Bitiya	
2009–2011	Agle Janam Mohe Bitiya Hi Kijo	
2021–2022	Aggar Tum Na Hote	
2017–2018	Aisi Deewangi Dekhi Nahi Kahi	
1997–2002	Amanat	
2016	Amma	
2020–2021	Apna Time Bhi Aayega	
2010–2011	Apno Ke Liye Geeta Ka Dharmayudh	
2007–2008	Ardhangini	
2002–2006	Astitva...Ek Prem Kahani	
2014	Aur Pyaar Ho Gaya	
2003–2004	Awaz - Dil Se Dil Tak	
2000–2001	Babul Ki Duwayen Leti Jaa	
2013	Badalte Rishton Ki Dastaan	
2014–2015	Bandhan	
1993–1997	Banegi Apni Baat	
2006–2009	Banoo Main Teri Dulhann	
2000–2001	Basera	
2024–2025	Bas Itna Sa Khwaab	
2010–2012	Bhagonwali-Baante Apni Taqdeer	
2021–2025	Bhagya Lakshmi	
2017–2018	Bhutu	
2013–2015	Buddha	
2001	Chandan Ka Palna Resham Ki Dori	
1996	Chandni	
1998–1999	Chashme Baddoor	
1996–1998	Chattan	
1993–1997	Campus	
2008–2012	Chotti Bahu	
1992	Commander	
1995–1996	Dastaan	
2017–2018	Detective Didi	
2009	Dhoop Mein Thandi Chaav... Maa	
2017–2018	Dil Dhoondta Hai	
2010–2011	Dil Se Diya Vachan	
2019–2020	Dil Yeh Ziddi Hai	
2013–2014	Do Dil Bandhe Ek Dori Se	
2010	Do Saheliyaan	
2013–2015	Doli Armaano Ki	
2001–2002	Dollar Bahu	
2013–2014	Ek Mutthi Aasmaan	
2011	Ek Nayi Chhoti Si Zindagi	
1996	Ek Raja Ek Rani	
2015–2017	Ek Tha Raja Ek Thi Rani	
2001–2003	Gharana	
2006–2009	Ghar Ki Lakshmi Betiyann	
1994	Grihalakshmi Ka Jinn	
2018–2021	Guddan Tumse Na Ho Payega	
2019	Hamari Bahu Silk	
2007–2008	Hamari Betiyoon Ka Vivaah	
2024–2025	Hamara Parivar	
2020–2021	Hamari Wali Good News	
2007–2008	Har Ghar Kuch Kehta Hai	
1995–1998	Hasratein	
2015	Hello Pratibha	
2011–2013	Hitler Didi	
2000	Hukumat	
2023–2024	Ikk Kudi Punjab Di	
2018–2020	Ishq Subhan Allah	
2021–2022	Iss Mod Se Jaate Hain	
2024–2026	Jaane Anjaane Hum Mile	
2006–2007	Jabb Love Hua	
2024–2026	Jagriti: Ek Nayi Subah	
2024–2025	Jamai No. 1	
2014–2017	Jamai Raja	
2015–2016	Janbaaz Sindbad	
2017–2018	Jeet Gayi Toh Piya Morey	
2009–2011	Jhansi Ki Rani	
2013–2015	Jodha Akbar	
2002	Justujoo	
2015–2017	Kaala Teeka	
2001	Kabhi To Milenge	
2003–2004	Kabhie Kabhie	
2001	Kaise Kahoon	
2023–2025	Kaise Mujhe Tum Mil Gaye	
1999	Kala Sona	
2018	Kaleerein	
2000	Kashti	
2002–2003	Kammal	
2006–2009	Kasamh Se	
2021–2022	Kashibai Bajirao Ballal	
2005	Kasshish	
2000–2001	Kartavya	
2010	Keshav Pandit	
2001	Khamoshiyan Kab Tak	
2013–2014	Khelti Hai Zindagi Aankh Micholi	
2002–2004	Kittie Party	
2001–2003	Kohi Apna Sa	
2000–2002	Koshish	
2014–2025	Kumkum Bhagya	
2017–2024	Kundali Bhagya	
2020–2021	Kyun Rishton Mein Katti Batti	
2023–2024	Kyunki Saas Maa Bahu Beti Hoti Hai	
2015–2016	Lajwanti	
1998–1999	Lakshay	
2004	Lavanya	
2023	Lag Ja Gale	
2002–2004	Lipstick	
2002	Love Marriage	
2007–2009	Maayka	
2024	Main Hoon Saath Tere	
2023	Maitree	
2006–2007	Mamta	
2003–2004	Manshaa	
2001	Manzilein Apani Apani	
1997	Margarita	
2000–2002	Mehndi Tere Naam Ki	
2022–2023	Main Hoon Aparajita	
2010	Mera Naam Karegi Roshan	
2021–2023	Meet: Badlegi Duniya Ki Reet	
2007–2008	Meri Doli Tere Angana	
2003	Miit	
2022	Mithai	
2009	Monica Mogre	
2011–2013	Mrs. Kaushik Ki Paanch Bahuein	
1998–1999	Mujhe Chaand Chahiye	
2001–2002	Mujhe Dor Koi Khinche	
2003	Mulk	
2004–2005	Pancham	
1993–1998	Parampara	
1994–1998	Parivartan	
2007–2008	Parrivaar – Kartavya Ki Pariksha	
2009–2014	Pavitra Rishta	
2012–2013	Phir Subah Hogi	
2002–2006	Piya Ka Ghar	
2017–2018	Piyaa Albela	
2012–2013	Punar Vivaah - Zindagi Milegi Dobara	
2013	Punar Vivah - Ek Nayi Umeed	
2023–2024	Pyar Ka Pehla Adhyaya: Shiv Shakti	
2022–2024	Pyar Ka Pehla Naam: Radha Mohan	
2003	Pyar Zindagi Hai	
2012–2016	Qubool Hai	
2020–2021	Qurbaan Hua	
2012–2013	Rab Se Sona Ishq	
2022–2024	Rabb Se Hai Dua	
2005–2006	Rabba Ishq Na Hove	
2007–2009	Rakhi	
2019	Rajaa Betaa	
2008–2009	Ranbir Rano	
2004–2006	Reth	
2021–2022	Rishton Ka Manjha	
2015	Rishton Ka Mela	
2002	Saanjhi	
2005–2009	Saat Phere: Saloni Ka Safar	
2008	Saath Saath Banayenge Ek Aashiyaan	
1995–1997	Sailaab	
2001	Samandar	
2022	Sanjog	
2010–2011	Sanjog Se Bani Sangini	
2011	Sanskaar Laxmi	
2016–2017	Sanyukt	
2012–2015	Sapne Suhane Ladakpan Ke	
2001–2003	Sarhadein	
2005–2006	Sarkarr:Rishton Ki Ankahi Kahani	
2015–2016	Sarojini - Ek Nayi Pehal	
2025–2026	Saru	
2014–2016	Satrangi Sasural	
1999	Saath Saath	
2015	Service Wali Bahu	
2017	Sethji	
1998–1999	Shapath	
2011–2012	Shobha Somnath Ki	
2005–2007	Sinndoor Tere Naam Ka	
2004	Tamanna House	
1993–1997	Tara	
2015–2016	Tashan-e-Ishq	
2007–2009	Teen Bahuraaniyaan	
2021	Teri Meri Ikk Jindri	
2021–2022	Tere Bina Jiya Jaye Na	
2000–2001	Thief of Baghdad	
2005	Time Bomb 9/11	
2002	Tu Kahe Agar	
2018–2021	Tujhse Hai Raabta	
2003–2005	Tum Bin Jaaoon Kahaan	
2004–2006	Tumhari Disha	
2015	Tumhi Ho Bandhu, Sakha Tumhi	
1999	Waaris	
2008	Waaris	
2017–2018	Woh Apna Sa	
2009–2012	Yahaan Main Ghar Ghar Kheli	
2001	Yeh Dil Kya Kare	
2000	Yeh To Pyaar Hai	
2015–2017	Yeh Vaada Raha	
2018–2020	Yeh Teri Galiyan	
2008	Zindagi Badal Sakta Hai Hadsaa	
2016–2018	Zindagi Ki Mehek	

=== Supernatural series ===
Year	Show	Notes
2019	Aghori	
2016–2021	Brahmarakshas	
2012–2019	Fear Files: Darr Ki Sacchi Tasvirein	
2019–2020	Haiwaan	
2014–2015	Maharakshak: Aryan	
2015	Maharakshak: Devi	
2018–2020	Manmohini	
1995	Mano Ya Na Mano	
2007–2009	Naaginn	
2001	Pradhan Mantri	
2004–2005	Rooh	
2008–2009	Shree	
2016	Vishkanya Ek Anokhi Prem Kahani	
1998	Woh	
1993–2001	Zee Horror Show	
1998–2002	X Zone	

=== Mythological series ===
Year	Show	Notes
1997	Ek Aur Mahabharat	
2006–2008	Raavan	
2002	Ramayan	
2012	Ramayan	

=== Reality/non-scripted ===
Year	Show	Notes
2001–2002	Aap Bolein Haan To Haan, Aap Bolein Naa To Naa	
1992	Aap Ki Adalat	
2016–2017	Aji Sunte Ho	
2007	Antakshari Intercollegiate Championship	
2002–2003	Archana Aaa-Haa	
2001	Baazi Kiski	
1992	Bournvita Quiz Contest	
2025	Chhoriyan Chali Gaon	
2008–2009	Chota Packet Bada Dhamaka	
2006–2007	Cricket Star	
2000	The Chust Drust show	
2013	Connected Hum Tum	
2002–2003	The Countdown Show	
2009–2022	Dance India Dance	
2000	Dastak	
2007	Don	
2000–2003	Dream Destinations	
2008	Ek Se Badhkar Ek – Jalwe Sitaron Ke	
2008–2009	Ek Se Badhkar Ek - Chota Packet Bada Dhamaka	
2000	Foot Loose	
2009	Hasne Aur Hasaane Ka Tonic – Ladies Special	
2006	Idea Jalsa	
2004–2014	India's Best Cinestars Ki Khoj	
2015	I Can Do That	
2017	India's Best Judwaa	
1999–2005	India's Most Wanted	
2006–2007	Idea Zee Cinestars	
2002	Jai Shri Swaminarayan	
2002–2008	Jeena Isi Ka Naam Hai	
2019	Juzzbaatt - Sangeen Se Namkeen Tak	
2002	Kaarvan Kismat Ka	
2025	Kahani Har Ghar Ki	
2005	Kam Ya Zyaada	
1993–2012	Khana Khazana	
2001	Nilamghar... Bid Bid Boom	
1994–1999	Philips Top 10	
2001	Razzmatazz	
2008	Rock-N-Roll Family	
1995–2025	Sa Re Ga Ma Pa	
1992–1994	Saanp Seedi	
2000	Sawaal Dus Crore Ka	
2006–2008	Shabaash India	
2001	Simply Shekhar	
2022	Swarn Swar Bharat	
1998	The Tech Show	
1993–2007	Titan Antakshari	
1993–1997	Tol Mol Ke Bol	
1997–1999	Top 10	
2009–2010	Wheel Ghar Ghar Mein	
2016	Yaaron Ki Baraat	
2016–2017	Yoga for You	
2000–2001	Zaike Ka Safar	

=== Hindi dubbed shows ===
- Figure It Out
- The Journey of Allen Strange
- Kenan & Kel
- Legends of the Hidden Temple
- Nickelodeon Guts

==== Animated series ====
- Aaahh!!! Real Monsters
- Aladdin
- The Angry Beavers
- Batman: The Animated Series
- Ben 10
- Bonkers
- Camp Lazlo
- Captain Planet and the Planeteers
- CatDog
- Chip 'n Dale: Rescue Rangers
- Codename: Kids Next Door
- Courage the Cowardly Dog
- Dexter's Laboratory
- Donald Duck Presents
- Donald's Quack Attack
- DuckTales
- Ed, Edd n Eddy
- The Flintstones
- Foster's Home for Imaginary Friends
- Good Morning, Mickey!
- Goof Troop
- Hey Arnold!
- The Jetsons
- The Little Mermaid
- The Mask: Animated Series
- Mickey's Mouse Tracks
- Mike, Lu & Og
- The New Adventures of Winnie the Pooh
- The New Scooby and Scrappy-Doo Show
- Pinky and the Brain
- The Powerpuff Girls
- The Real Adventures of Jonny Quest
- The Road Runner Show
- Robotboy
- Rugrats
- Samurai Jack
- Sheep in the Big City
- Superman: The Animated Series
- The Sylvester & Tweety Mysteries
- TaleSpin
- Timon & Pumbaa
- Tom & Jerry Kids

=== Television films ===
- Hanste Khelte (1994)
- Phir Teri Kahani Yaad Aayee (1993)
- Mr. Shrimati (1994)
- Mohini (1995)
- Chura Ke Dil Mera (2002)

== See also ==
- List of programmes broadcast by &TV
- List of programmes broadcast by Zee Zindagi
