= Keerti Gaekwad Kelkar =

Indian television actress

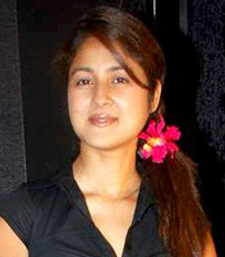
- Gaekwad Kelkar in 2010
- Born: 21 January 1974 (age 52); Mumbai, Maharashtra, India
- Occupation: Actress
- Years active: 2000–present
- Known for: Sasural Simar Ka
- Height: 5 ft 8 in (1.73 m)
- Spouse: Sharad Kelkar (m. 2005)
- Children: 1

Keerti Gaekwad Kelkar (born 21 January 1974) is an Indian television actress and model. She is prominently known for playing the leading character of Simar Prem Bharadwaj in television series Sasural Simar Ka. She began her career in 2002 with her first television debut in Kammal. In 2004, she did a TV series called Aakrosh, where she met the love of her life Sharad Kelkar who is a famous Bollywood and Indian Television Celebrity and Ex-Physical Trainer. She did a quite a number of TV shows and in some of them, she was cast opposite to her husband.

== Career ==
She debuted as Kammal in Kammal and went on to play "Kanan" in Kahiin To Hoga and "Niharika" in Sinndoor Tere Naam Ka on Zee TV. She participated with her husband Sharad Kelkar in the second season of dance reality show Nach Baliye 2. In 2011, she took a Break from television. In 2017, she entered the Popular series Sasural Simar Ka as Simar, replacing the former Protagonist Dipika Kakar who was previously playing Simar. About her Comeback to screen after six years, she added "I wanted to return to television with a good project. Over the years, family took precedence and I was happy with that. But then, Colors TV approached me for Simar's role in Sasural Simar Ka, and I was sold. I am nervous and excited at the same time to face the camera after so long. She continues "Television has changed so much over the past few years, there are many new concepts and formats. Even the viewers are open to Storylines and narratives that were unfathomable earlier." About Replacing Dipika Kakar and her entry in the show, she said "Though the character of Simar is already established, the challenge lies in adding some freshness to it. I wouldn't have taken it up if it wasn't so challenging. I've seen Dipika in Sasural Simar Ka, and she's been fabulous. The show will bring its focus back on the Mother-daughter relationship and I believe that I will portray the role perfectly since I am also a mother." The show ended in March 2018.

== Personal life ==
Keerti married her co-star from Sinndoor Tere Naam Ka and Saat Phere: Saloni Ka Safar, Sharad Kelkar on 3 June 2005.

== Films ==
Year	Movie	Role	Language	Notes
2008	Kanyadaan	Nandini	Bhojpuri	
2025	Dil Dosti Aur Dogs	Neelima	Hindi	JioHotstar film

=== Kiah Films Production ===
Year	Movie	Producer	Director(s)	Co-Producer(s)	Language
2018	Idak	Herself	Deepak Gawade / Archana Borhade	Sharad Kelkar / Baishakhi Banerjee	Marathi

== Television ==
Year	Serial	Role	Notes
2000–2001	Om Namah Shivay	Maharani Draupadi	Debut
2001–2002	Jai Santoshi Maa	Santoshi Maa	Main Female Lead
2002	Ssshhhh...Koi Hai – Rang Barse	Sunehri (Episode 36)	Episodic role
2002–2003	Kammal	Kamal Manav Jajoo	Main Female Lead
2002–2003	Har Mod Par	Hansa	Main Female Lead
2003	Ghar Sansaar	Mamata Sanjay Chaudhary	Main Female Lead
2003	Vikraal Aur Gabraal – Rang Barse	Sunehri (Episode 13)	Episodic Role
2004	Aakrosh	Kiran Ahuja	
2004	Raat Hone Ko Hai – Bargad: Part 1 to Part 4	Naina (Episode 57 to Episode 60)	Episodic Role
2004	Siddhanth	Deepa	
2004	Raat Hone Ko Hai – Obit Column: Part 1 to Part 4	Kartika (Episode 125 to Episode 128)	Episodic Role
2004–2006	Kahiin To Hoga	Kanan Sinha	Protagonist Supporting Role
2005	Aahat – He Who Writes A Chain Letter Dies: Part 1 & Part 2	Deepti (Episode 11 & Episode 12)	Episodic Role
2005	Hotel Kingston		
2005–2006	India Calling	Manisha "Mini" Kapoor	
2005–2007	Sinndoor Tere Naam Ka	Niharika Agarwal / Niharika Antariksh Raizada / Niharika Rudra Raizada	Main Female Lead
2006	Nach Baliye 2	Contestant	Reality show
2006–2007	Saat Phere – Saloni Ka Safar	Devika Nahar Singh	Main Female Antagonist
2006–2007	Saat Phere – Saloni Ka Safar	Chandni Singh	Main Female Antagonist
2007–2008	Solhah Singaarr	Meera Bharadwaj (After Plastic Surgery) / Advocate Meera Karan Kapoor; Sonia Shakti Chaturvedi; Sheela	Main Female Antagonist
2008	Saas v/s Bahu	Contestant	Reality show
2008–2010	Chotti Bahu - Sindoor Bin Suhagan	Mrinalini Vivek Purohit	Main Female Antagonist
2010	Meethi Choori No 1	Contestant	Reality show
2017	Ek Shringaar – Swabhiman	Simar Prem Bharadwaj (Episode 90)	Crossover Episode with Sasural Simar Ka
2017	Shakti – Astitva Ke Ehsaas Ki	Simar Prem Bharadwaj (Episode 244)	Crossover Episode with Sasural Simar Ka
2017–2018	Sasural Simar Ka	Simar Prem Bharadwaj	Main Female Lead
2018	Ishq Mein Marjawan – Jashn-E-Tashan	Simar Prem Bharadwaj (Episode 74)	Special Episode with Ishq Mein Marjawan on New Year's Day
2019	Kitchen Champion 5	Guest Contestant (Episode 45)	Cooking show
