= Arvind Babbal =

Indian film director

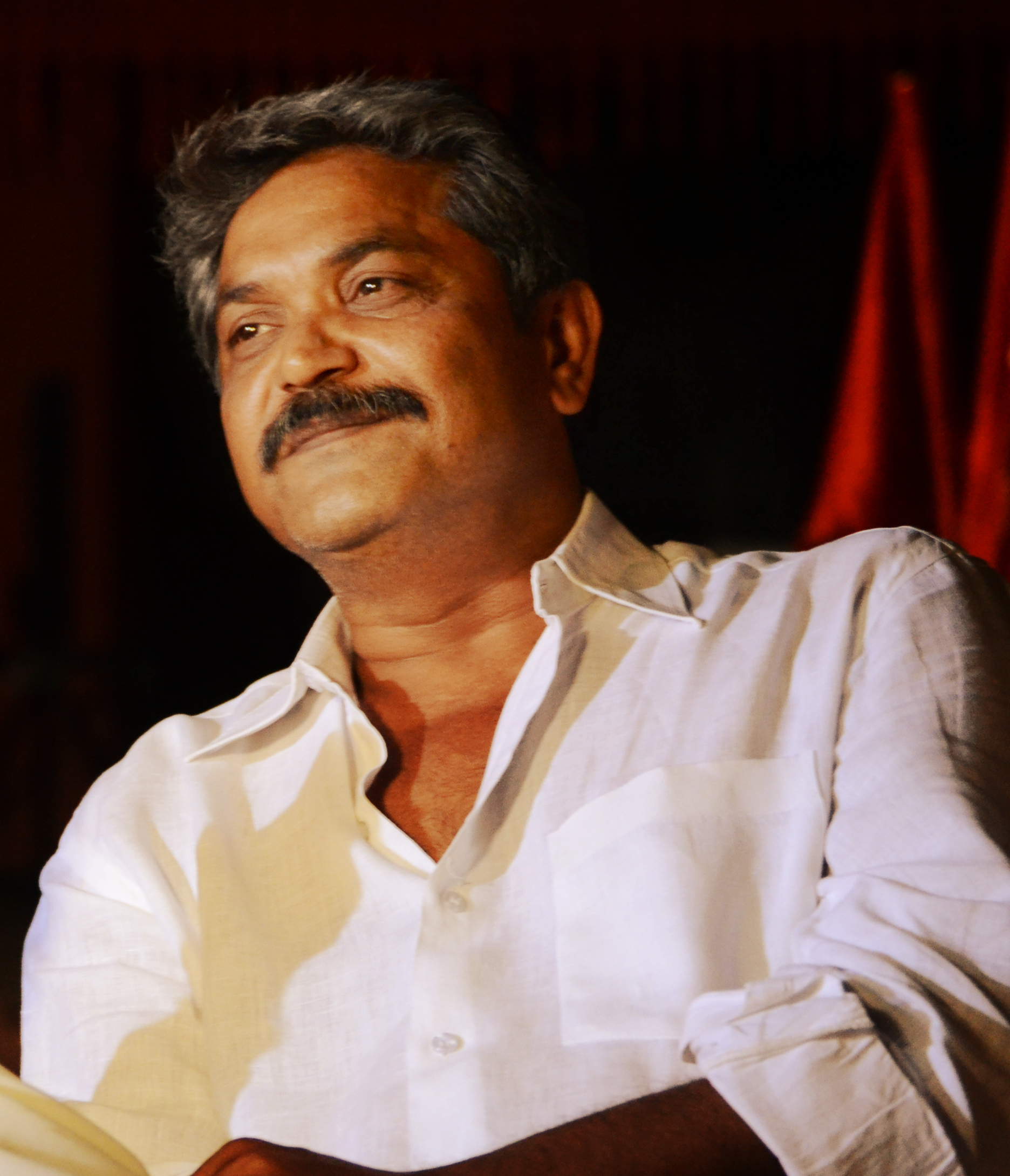
- Born: 2 March 1965 (age 61); Hathras, Uttar Pradesh, India
- Education: Pannalal Girdharlal Dayanand Anglo Vedic College, University of Delhi
- Occupations: Director producer at Arvind Babbal Productions Pvt. Ltd.
- Years active: 1986–present
- Known for: Maha Kumbh: Ek Rahasaya, Ek Kahani; Saraswatichandra (TV series); Shobha Somnath Ki; Yeshu; Kyun Rishton Mein Katti Batti; Mithai; Vasudha
- Spouse: Rekha Babbal
- Parent(s): Radheyshyam Pragalbh, Kusum Prgalbh
- Relatives: Ashok Chakradhar

Arvind Babbal is the director and producer of Maha Kumbh: Ek Rahasaya, Ek Kahani for Life OK. He also produced shows like Yeshu for &TV, Kyun Rishton Mein Katti Batti and Mithai for Zee TV under the banner of Arvind Babbal Productions. Since 2024, he is the producer and director of Vasudha.

== Early life and career ==
Son of Hindi author Radheyshyam Pragalbh and Kusum Prgalbh, Babbal was born on 2 March 1965 in Hathras, Uttar Pradesh, India. He is the younger brother of author, poet and television personality Ashok Chakradhar. A Commerce graduate from P.G.D.A.V College, University of Delhi, Arvind started his career as an assistant of well known director of Hindi films Lekh Tandan in the year 1986–87.

His first film as a director is the Tele-film Akhirkaar assigned by Directorate of Adult Education, Government of India. He shifted his base to Mumbai in the year 1998, and has been directing television series since then.

He has directed television series like Saraswatichandra (TV series), Shobha Somnath Ki, Mera Naam Karegi Roshan, Kesar, Aati Rahengi Baharein, Yahaaan Main Ghar Ghar Kheli, Mitwa Phool Kamal Ke, Jiya Jale, Durgeshnandini, Awaz - Dil Se Dil Tak, Chhoti Maa ... Ek Anokha Bandhan.

Babbal has been nominated at New York Festivals -International Television & Film Awards, 2016 in the Best Director (India) category for 'Mahakumbh -Ek Rahasya Ek Kahani'. The series received Certificate of Merit at the 52nd-Chicago-international-television-awards, 2016. Arvind Babbal has received eight nominations in ITA's 'Best Director' category. His production house Arvind Babbal Productions Pvt. Ltd. has produced Maha Kumbh: Ek Rahasaya, Ek Kahani for Television channel Life OK.

He is married to Rekha Babbal, an actor, producer and social activist; and has two sons Bhanu Babbal and Raghu Babbal.
