= Rough Book =

- Rough Book poster
- Directed by: Ananth Narayan Mahadevan
- Written by: Sanjay Chouhan; Ananth Mahadevan
- Starring: Tannishtha Chatterjee; Amaan Khan; Joy Sengupta; Jayati Bhatia; Vinay Jain; Deepika Amin; Kinjal Rajpriya
- Release date: 2016
- Country: India
- Language: Hindi

Rough Book is a feature film directed by Ananth Narayan Mahadevan for Aerika Cineworks. It features Tannishtha Chatterjee and Amaan Khan in lead roles with Joy Sengupta, Jayati Bhatia, Deepika Amin and Vinay Jain in supporting roles. Television actor Ram Kapoor makes an appearance. The narrative was written by Sanjay Chouhan and Ananth Mahadevan.

The filmmakers describe what they assert to be the problems of the Indian educational system, impeding opportunities for growth, and what they believe to be teachers' typical demand and supply mentality towards education.

== Plot ==
Rough Book is a hard look at the education system in India. Though one of the finest systems in the world, the lacunae in the system have created issues that are threatening to clog the channels of learning in contemporary India. The story revolves around the division among students on the basis of their grades. It avoids melodrama. A teacher and her students rebel against the system.

Rough Book is based on the actual experiences of parents, teachers, and students told through the eyes of a teacher, Santoshi Kumari, who rallies through a divorce with a corrupt senior Indian Revenue Service officer to become a teacher of physics. Her pupils are in the D division — "D" sarcastically refers to Duffers in the school by students and teachers. How Santoshi tackles a system to set her own terms for her students forms the bulk of a simply told, thought-provoking, and urgent film. The rebellion of the teacher and her students is internalised to make a relevant and contemporary movie.

== Cast ==
- Tannishtha Chatterjee
- Amaan F Khan
- Kaizaad Kotwal
- Joy Sengupta
- Jayati Bhatia
- Vinay Jain
- Farid Currim
- Deepika Amin

== Festivals and awards ==
=== Official selections ===
- New York Indian Film Festival 2015

=== Awards ===
- Best Feature Film (Indian Film Festival of Houston 2015)
- Special Director's Award (San Francisco Global Movie Fest)
- Best Story (Washington DC SAFF)
- Best Director Rajasthan International Film Festival 2016
