= Siddhaanth Vir Surryavanshi =

Indian actor (1975–2022)

- Born: Anand Suryavanshi; 15 December 1975; Mumbai, Maharashtra, India
- Died: 11 November 2022 (aged 46); Mumbai, Maharashtra, India
- Occupations: Model; actor
- Years active: 2001–2022
- Spouse: Ira Suryavanshi (m. 2000; div. 2015) Alesia Raut (m. 2017–2022)
- Children: 2

Siddhaanth Vir Surryavanshi (15 December 1975 – 11 November 2022), also known as Anand Suryavanshi, was an Indian television actor. He appeared in over 25 Hindi television shows during his 21-year career and was known for his roles in Mamta and Kasautii Zindagii Kay.

== Career ==
Surryavanshi made his television debut with Ekta Kapoor's series Kkusum in 2001. He appeared in two episodes of Krishna Arjun. In 2002–03, he played the recurring role of Vineet Khanna in Kasautii Zindagii Kay, which was one of his most popular roles. In 2004–05, he appeared in Zameen Se Aassman Tak, Sinndoor Tere Naam Ka and Saat Phere – Saloni Ka Safar. He played the lead role of Akshay Srivastav in Zee TV series Mamta in 2006–07. In 2008, he played the lead role of Rishi in family drama Grihasti on Star Plus.

During 2009–11, he appeared in various TV shows, such as Virrudh, Bhagyavidhaata and Kya Dill Mein Hai. In 2012, he appeared as Dr. Dev in the Life OK crime detective supernatural series SuperCops Vs SuperVillains, also known as Hum Ne Li Hai... Shapath. He appeared in an episode of horror anthology series Fear Files: Darr Ki Sacchi Tasvirein along with Siddharth Vasudev. In 2015–16, he played the role of Karna's foster father Adiratha Sushen in the mythological epic series Suryaputra Karn. In 2016, he played for the Ahmedabad Express team as one of the contestants in the second season of the celebrity indoor cricket reality show Box Cricket League. He appeared as antagonist Harjeet Bajwa in the &TV social drama Waaris. He also appeared in the Star Plus series about Karna, Karn Sangini, which aired between October 2018 and February 2019. In 2019, he played the role of Mamoon Shah in the Star Bharat drama series Sufiyana Pyaar Mera.

In 2020–21, he played a lead role in the Zee TV drama series Kyun Rishton Mein Katti Batti as Kuldeep Chaddha, opposite Neha Marda. This was his first appearance in a major role after five years. He committed himself to playing the character of Kuldeep by gaining muscular definition, going on a special diet, and working out regularly for six months.

In 2022, he played the recurring role of Major Param Shergill in the Sony SAB youth-based drama series Ziddi Dil Maane Na. He appeared as DCP Shantanu Vyas in the Dangal TV crime thriller Control Room, which was his last TV appearance.

== Personal life and death ==
Surryavanshi was born Anand Suryavanshi on 15 December 1975 in India. He married Ira in 2000 and the couple have a daughter. They divorced by mutual consent in 2015. He changed his name to Siddhaanth Vir Surryavanshi on the advice of a numerologist in 2016.

He married Russian-Indian model Alesia Raut in November 2017. It was the second marriage for both of them; Alesia has a son from her previous marriage.

Surryavanshi collapsed while working out in a gym in Mumbai on 11 November 2022. He was rushed to Kokilaben Dhirubhai Ambani Hospital, but was declared dead. Cardiac arrest was deemed to have been the cause of death. After similar recent deaths such as those of comedian Raju Srivastav and Kannada film actor Puneeth Rajkumar, concerns about sudden fatalities arising from over-exercising have been raised in India.

== Television ==
Year(s)	Show	Role	Notes	Ref
2001	Kkusum	Gautam Bajaj		
2002	Krishna Arjun	Amit (Episode 3 & Episode 4)		
2002–2003	Kasautii Zindagii Kay	Vineet Khanna		
2003	Ssshhhh...Koi Hai – Vikraal Aur Krantika	Himanshu (Episode 99)		
2003	Kayaamat – Jabb Bhi Waqt Aata Hai	Rohan		
2004	Zameen Se Aassman Tak			
2005	Sinndoor Tere Naam Ka	Rahul Malhotra		
2005	Saat Phere – Saloni Ka Safar	Samar Singh		
2006–2007	Mamta	Akshay Srivastav	Lead role	
2007	Virrudh	Dhairya Raisinghania		
2007–2008	Kya Dill Mein Hai	Aniket		
2008–2009	Grihasti	Rishi	Lead role	
2009–2011	Bhagyavidhaata	Arjun		
2011	Behenein	Jay Mehta		
2011	Yeh Ishq Haaye	Ranveer Malhotra		
2012	Hum Ne Li Hai - Shapath	Dr. Dev		
2012	Fear Files	Soldier (Episode 49)		
2015–2016	Suryaputra Karn	Adhiratha Sushen		
2016	Box Cricket League	Contestant	Sports reality television show	
2016–2017	Waaris	Harjeet Bajwa		
2018–2019	Karn Sangini	Adhirath Sushen		
2019	Sufiyana Pyaar Mera	Mamoon Shah		
2020–2021	Kyun Rishton Mein Katti Batti	Kuldeep Chaddha	Lead role	
2022	Ziddi Dil Maane Na	Major Param Shergill	Recurring role	
2022	Control Room	D.C.P. Shantanu Vyas	Supporting role	

Awards and Nominations

Year	Award	Category	Show	Result	Ref
2007	Indian Telly Awards	Best Ensemble Cast	Virrudh	Won	
