= Kushal Punjabi =

Indian actor (1977–2019)

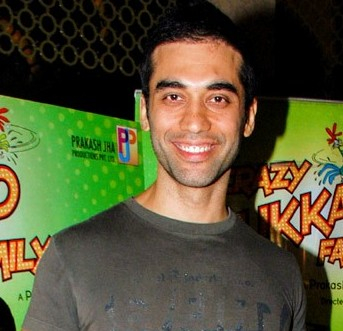
- Kushal Punjabi at the screening of Crazy Cukkad Family in 2015
- Born: 23 April 1977; Bombay, Maharashtra, India
- Died: 26 December 2019 (aged 42); Mumbai, Maharashtra, India
- Occupation: Actor
- Years active: 1996–2019
- Known for: Kaal; Lakshya; Ishq Mein Marjaawaan

Kushal Punjabi (23 April 1977 – 26 December 2019) was an Indian film and television actor. He won the TV reality game show Zor Ka Jhatka: Total Wipeout, the Indian version of US game show Wipeout in February 2011, taking home the prize of ₹50 lakh (equivalent to ₹1.0 crore or US$110,000 in 2023).

Punjabi had been in movies such as Farhan Akhtar's Lakshya, Karan Johar's Kaal, UTV's Dhan Dhana Dhan Goal, and Cinevistaa's Sssshhh.... He had also appeared in a number of television series, most recently in Ishq Mei Marjawan on Colors TV, where he plays an advocate. In addition, he has participated in several reality shows, including Fear Factor, Mr. & Miss TV, Paisa Bhari Padega, Nautica Navigators Challenge, Ek Se Badhkar Ek, and Jhalak Dikhhla Jaa.

He had been a professional modern jazz and hip hop dancer and choreographed the Gladrags Manhunt Megamodel and Mrs. India contests as well as various fashion shows and music videos. He choreographed and directed the 'Star Walk' Fashion event for UMEED (a NGO for children).

== Early life and family ==
Kushal Punjabi was born on 23 April 1977 into a Sindhi family. His father is from Karachi, his mother is from Hyderabad, and he was born and raised in Mumbai. As a child, Punjabi was extremely active and started cycling, skating, swimming and dancing very early. In the coming years he played football, and swam for his school and college. He loved travelling and being outdoors, and his spirit of adventure made him an apt candidate for adventure sports which he did with great passion. His love of dance theatre and music helped him in becoming a serious actor, and he went on to do more than 20 TV shows, 5 films, and numerous music videos and commercials.

== Career ==
He started his career as a dancer and model, and participated in Gladrags Manhunt Contest, in 2000. He also appeared in the music album of Shweta Shetty pop song Deewane To Deewane Hai in 1997. His television career began with the TV series A Mouthful Of Sky in 1995 for DD Metro channel, followed by Love Marriage in 2002 on Zee TV, and also appeared in a number of series like Don in 2006 for Star One, Santaan from 2007–2008 for Star Plus, Kasamh se in 2006 for Zee TV, Sssshh...Phir Koi Hain for Star One and King Aasman Ka Ek Raja for Sony TV. He appeared as Sub-inspector in CID: Special Bureau, detective-crime TV series, CID (on Sony TV) from 2003 to 2004 and had a small role in the TV series, Kkusum. In 2004, he appeared as a lead in Dekho Magar Pyaar Se (on STAR Plus), an Indian adaptation of popular Venezuelan TV series, Mi Gorda Bella and also in popular comedy TV series, Kabhi Haan Kabhi Naa on Zee TV. His other shows were Antariksh in 2008 for Star Plus, Yeh Dil Chahe More in 2006 for Star One, Hum Tum in 2008 for Zee Next and Rishta dot com on Sony TV in 2010 for Yash Raj productions. He also appeared in STAR Plus TV series, Raja Ki Aayegi Baraat from 2008 to 2010. In 2010, he did a cameo in SAB TV's Gutur Gu, India's first silent comedy series. He then bagged a prominent role in Cinevista's Sssshhh..., Farhan Akhtar's film, Lakshya (2004), followed by Karan Johar's Kaal, which also starred Ajay Devgn.

He appeared in Hindi films, like Sssshhh... (2003) Lakshya (2004), Kaal (2005), Salaam-e-Ishq: A Tribute to Love (2007) and Dhan Dhana Dhan Goal (2007).

He was a trained dancer-choreographer and worked as a dancer/trainer with Shiamak Davar for while. He participated in reality shows like Mr. & Ms. TV (2007), Fear Factor, Fun on the Run and Ek Se Badhkar Ek (2008) on Zee TV, and in 2011 won the TV reality game show Zor Ka Jhatka, the Indian version of Wipeout!, which started with 28 contestants, in an obstacle course set in Argentina, and was hosted by Shah Rukh Khan, and was shooting for Balaji Film's Rock the Shaadi as 1 of the 3 main leads. He also made a wild card entry in the dance reality show Jhalak Dikhhla Jaa.

== Death ==
Punjabi was found dead at his residence in Bandra, Mumbai on 26 December 2019. The cause of death was reported to be suicide by hanging. He died at the age of 42. He was suffering from depression. Before committing suicide, he distributed his property among his parents and son, as stated in his suicide note. In the words of co-actor Chetan Hansraj, "He was going through separation from his wife and was down with sickness".

== Filmography ==
=== Film ===
Year	Title	Role	Director
1996	Bomgay		Riyad Vinci Wadia, Jangu Sethna
1998	Bombay Boys		Kaizad Gustad
2003	Andaaz		Raj Kanwar
2003	Sssshhh...	Nikhil	Pavan S Kaul
2004	Lakshya	Rajiv Goel	Farhan Akhtar
2005	Kaal	Sajid	Soham Shah
2007	Salaam-e-Ishq	Rohit Chaddha	Nikhil Advani
2007	Dhan Dhana Dhan Goal	Ranveer "Goalie"	Vivek Agnihotri
2007	Don		
2015	Crazy Cukkad Family		Ritesh Menon
2017	A Gentleman		Raj Nidimoru and Krishna D.K.
2017	Szoya the Black Widow	Assassin	
2017	Black Widow: A Land Bleeds	Assassin	

=== Television ===
Year	Title	Role	Notes
1995	A Mouthful of Sky		
1997	Humko Ishq ne Maara	Arjun Sablok	Bhagyavidhata Films
2002	Love Marriage		
2004	Dekho Magar Pyaar Se		175 episodes
2004	Kabhi Haan Kabhi Naa	Chetan	
2004	King Aassman Ka Ek Raja		
2005	CID	Inspector Kushal	
2005	Yeh Dil Chahe More		
2005	Antariksh		
2005	Fear Factor	Contestant	Reality show
2005	Paisa Bhari Padega		Reality show
2006	Kasamh Se	Lawyer in Walia Divorce	
2006	Santaan		
2006	Fun on the Run		Reality show
2006–2009	Ssshhhh...Phir Koi Hai	Rahul	Episode 15
2006–2009	Ssshhhh...Phir Koi Hai	Major Amar / Manav (Hotel Manager) / Rahul	4 episodes
2006–2009	Ssshhhh...Phir Koi Hai	Dhruv	Episodes 176 and 177
2008	Hum Tum		
2008	Ek Se Badhkar Ek		Reality show
2008	Raja Ki Aayegi Baraat		
2008	Mr. & Ms. TV	Contestant	Reality show (Quit)
2009	Sitaron Ki Jung		Reality show
2010	Gutur Gu		
2010	Rishta dot com		
2011	Zor ka Jhatka		Reality show
2012	Aasman Se Aage	Alan	1 episode
2012	Teri Meri Love Stories		One episode only
2013	Welcome - Baazi Mehmaan-Nawaazi ki		
2013	Hum Ne Li Hai- Shapath		
2014	Jhalak Dikhhla Jaa 7		Reality show
2014	Adaalat		
2015	Zindagi Wins		
2015	#LoveBytes	Abhishek Verma	
2017	Kya Haal, Mr. Paanchal?	Lord Shiva	1 episode
2018	Sajan Re Phir Jhooth Mat Bolo		
2018	Ishq Mein Marjawan	Danny Manchanda	
2019	CIF	Shanti Bhushan Tiwari	Episode 15

=== Web series ===
Year	Title	Role	Notes
2018	Truth or Tamanna?	Kaizad Poonawala	Kaizad Dance Academy Owner
