= Rishina Kandhari =

Indian television actress

- Born: Rishina Awasthi; 21 June 1986 (age 39)
- Occupation: Actress
- Years active: 2004–present
- Spouse: Vishal Kandhari
- Relatives: Ashok Awasthi (father)

Rishina Kandhari is an Indian actress whose major roles include Princess Khyati on Devon Ke Dev... Mahadev, the Goddess Laxmi in Tenali Rama, Empress Hamida Banu Begum in Akbar - Rakht Se Takht Ka Safar and Shanti Madam on Yeh Un Dinon Ki Baat Hai. Her father, Ashok Awasthi is also a television actor who does supporting roles.

== Filmography ==
=== Television ===
Show	Role	Notes
Kkusum	Sonia	
Saath Rahega Always	Palak	
Aakrosh	Saloni Saxena	
Akbar - Rakht Se Takht Ka Safar	Hamida Banu Begum	
C.I.D	various characters	
Crime Patrol	various characters	
Rishton Se Badi Pratha	Pratima Amar Singh	
Uttaran	Malavika Rathore / Mouli	
Tashan-e-Ishq	Nikki Sarna	
Yudh		
Dil Ki Nazar Se Khoobsurat	Aaradhya Periwal	
Adaalat	ATS Head Sunanda	
Karan - The Detective	Monica (Karan's assistant)	
Na Aana Is Des Laado	Tanisha Chautala	
Diya Aur Baati Hum	Arpita Khanna	
Yeh Chanda Kanoon Hai	Inspector Moonmoon	
Supercops Vs Supervillians	Kiana	
Devon Ke Dev...Mahadev	Princess Khyati	
Yeh Un Dinon Ki Baat Hai	Shanti	
Tu Sooraj, Main Saanjh Piyaji	Arpita Khanna	
Prithvi Vallabh - Itihaas Bhi, Rahasya Bhi	Rohini	
Tenali Rama	Goddess Laxmi	
21 Sarfarosh - Saragarhi 1897	Begum	
Laut Aao Trisha	Inspector Reshma	
Ishaaron Ishaaron Mein	Rani Srivastav	
Aye Mere Humsafar	Imarti Kothari	
Na Umra Ki Seema Ho	Priya Raichand	

== Television ==
Year	Serial	Role	Channel
2012	Savdhaan India	Episode 8	Life OK
2023–2024	Teri Meri Doriyaann	Senior Inspector Megha Kashyap	Star Plus

=== Films ===
Year	Film	Role	Notes
2014	Ek Villain	Nurse	
2018	Saheb, Biwi Aur Gangster 3	News Reporter	
2018	Lupt	Geeta	

=== Web series ===
Title	Role	Platform
Virgin Suspect	Shanaya	Ullu App
