= Mamta (TV series) =

Hindi television series

- Created by: Shobhna Desai Productions & Entertainment One Productions
- Written by: Anshuman Sinha
- Directed by: Vijay Verma, Apoorva Acharya, Ismail Umar Khan.
- Starring: See below
- Opening theme: "Mamta" by Shreya Ghoshal
- Country of origin: India
- No. of seasons: 1
- No. of episodes: 457

Production
- Producer: Shobhna Desai
- Running time: Approx. 22 minutes

Original release
- Network: Zee TV
- Release: 9 January 2006 – 12 October 2007

Mamta was a Hindi television serial that aired from 9 January 2006 to 12 October 2007 on Zee TV, about the universal theme of motherhood.

== Plot ==
The show is based on the story of a woman named Mamta, who is a surrogate mother to a child named Krish. After the birth, she is told that the baby died during birth. A year later she learns that the baby is alive but in danger. She goes to a new, unknown city where she doesn't know anyone to save the child.

Mamta meets Akshay and they marry but he soon meets with an accident and is thought to have been killed. Mamta discovers she is pregnant with Akshay's child and decides to marry Sid for the sake of the unborn child. Akshay returns and unaware that Mamta is pregnant, he tries to avenge what he thinks is a betrayal. When he realises his mistake, Mamta refuses to forgive him because he tried to kill not only her but also their baby. However, Mamta miscarries and loses the baby. Unable to bear the pain, Mamta leaves everything and moves away.

=== 20 years later ===
Krish has grown up. Sid married another woman after Mamta moved away and has two grown up daughters - Sanjana and Meera. Meera falls in love with Krish who in turn falls for Sanjana.

== Cast ==
=== Main ===
- Neha Mehta as Mamta Srivastav
- Anand Suryavanshi as Akshay Srivastav

=== Recurring Cast ===
- Harshad Chopda / Akshat Gupta / Vijay Bhatia as Karan Srivastav
- Amit Behl as Anand Srivastav
- Ajay Krishnamoorthi as Sidharth aka Sid
- Krishina Bhatia as Child Krish Srivastav
- Ashok Sinha as Teenager Krish Srivastav
- Gagan Aryan as Krish Srivastav
- Aseem Agrawal as Pasha
- Nishigandha Wad as Damyanti Anand Srivastav
- Narayani Shastri as Mamta Akshay Srivastav
- Anita Kulkarni / Suhasini Mulay as Damyanti Anand Srivastav
- Amrapali Gupta as Masooma Srivastav
- Preeti Puri as Tanisha Akshay Srivastav / Tanisha Karan Srivastav / Tanisha Vikram Oberoi
- Jhumma Mitra as Fulwari
- Parineeta Borthakur as Anamika
- Neha Sharad as Shaina, Sid's mother
- Megha Gupta as Satya Akshay Srivastav
- Muskaan Mihani as Masooma Srivastav
- Neha Marda as Simran
- Neetha Shetty as Sanjana
- Jyostsna Karyekar as Dadi
- Jayati Bhatia as Mishti
- Akansha as Mimi
- Abhishek Ohri as Aarav
- Shruti Sharma as Meera
- Vaishnavi Mahant as Vasundhara
- Harsh Vashisht as Vikram Oberoi
- Khyaati Khandke Keswani as Siddharth's Wife
- Siraj Mustafa Khan as Satya's Boyfriend
- Sumukhi Pendse as Karan's Real Mother
- Anang Desai as Mamta's Uncle
- Sanjay Mitra
- Dolly Bindra
- Ahmad Harhash (actor) as Soni Raj Singh
