= Sachin Shroff =

Indian television actor

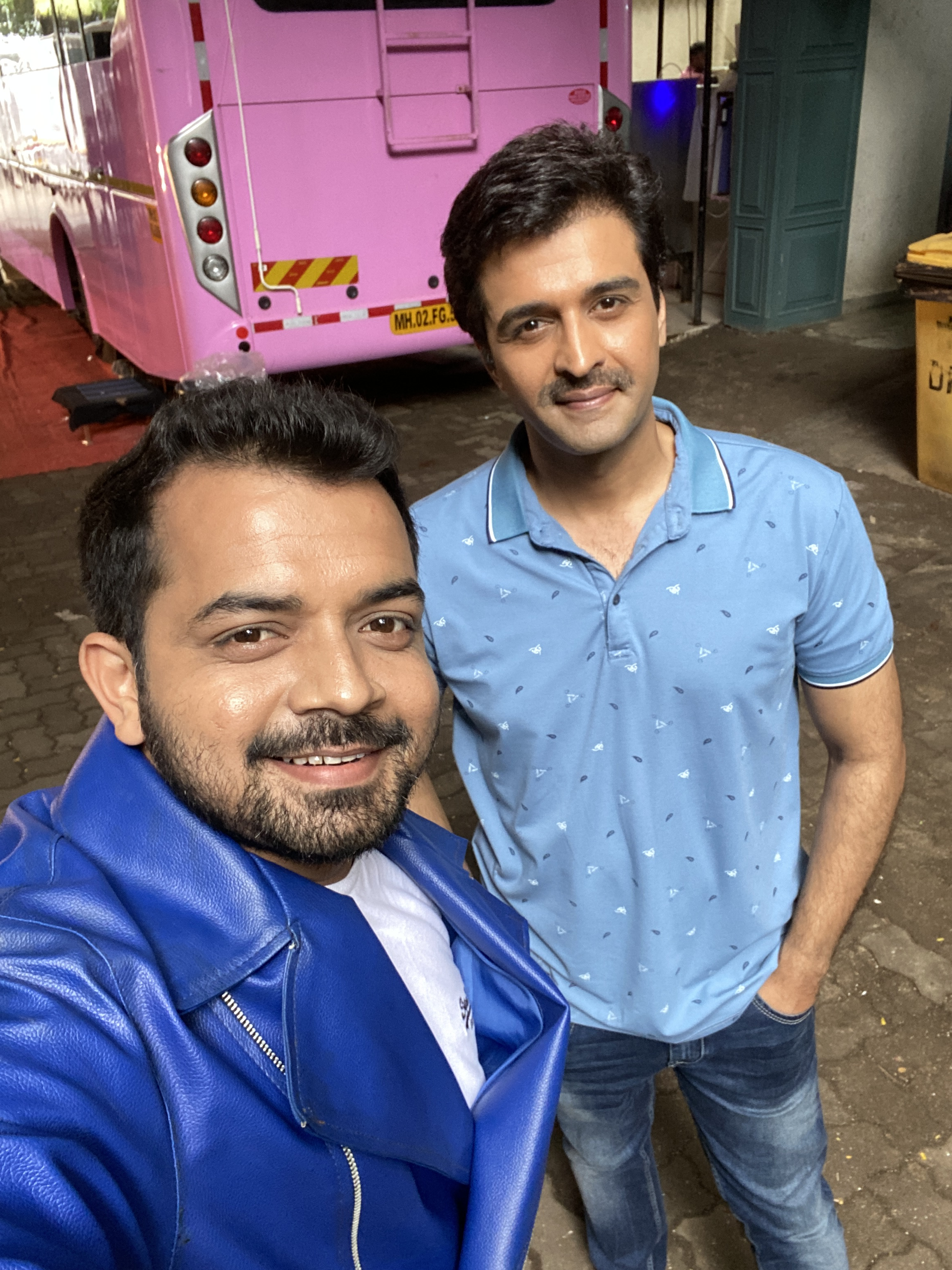
- Shroff (right) shooting with Pushkar Priydarshi (left) for Taarak Mehta Ka Ooltah Chashmah 2022
- Born: 17 December; Mumbai, Maharashtra, India
- Occupation: Actor
- Years active: 2002–present
- Spouses: Juhi Parmar (m. 2009; div. 2018) Chandani Kothi (m. 2023)
- Children: 1

Sachin Shroff (born 17 December) is an Indian television and film actor. He played Gyan in Har Ghar Kuch Kehta Hai and Arjun in Naaginn – Waadon Ki Agniparikshaa. Other appearances include Sinndoor Tere Naam Ka, Saat Phere – Saloni Ka Safar, Naam Gum Jayegaa, Shagun, Vishwaas and Taarak Mehta Ka Ooltah Chashmah.

== Personal life ==
Sachin Shroff married television actress Juhi Parmar on 15 February 2009 at a palace in Jaipur. The couple have a daughter, born on 27 January 2013.

In early January 2018, Parmar confirmed that they had filed for divorce, which was finalised in July 2018. Parmar was granted custody of their daughter.

He married Chandani Kothi on 25 February 2023.

== Filmography ==
=== Films ===
Year	Title	Role	Notes
2022	Dasvi	Sandeep Sangwan	
2022	Double XL	Saurabh Khanna	

=== Television ===
Year	Serial	Role	Notes	References
2002	Kammal	Viraj	Supporting Role	
2003	Naam Gum Jayegaa		Supporting Role	
2003	Vishwaas	Ram Dikshit	Lead Role	
2003–2004	Shagun		Supporting Role	
2004	Kabhie Kabhie – Uttar Dakshin			
2005	Instant Khichdi	Pranay	Episode 2	
2005	C.I D. Special Bureau – The Case Of The Surprised Return: Part 1 to Part 4	Inspector Sujeev / Sumeet	Episode 61 to Episode 64	
2005–2007	Sinndoor Tere Naam Ka	Dhruv Raizada	Lead Role	
2006	Sinndoor Tere Naam Ka	Karan Raizada (Oberoi)	Negative Role	
2006	Vaidehi	Siddharth Singhania	Supporting Role	
2007	Mano Ya Na Mano	Arnav	Episode: "Fortune Teller"	
2007	Saat Phere – Saloni Ka Safar	Shekhar Sharma " Fake Abhi"	Negative Role	
2007–2008	Har Ghar Kuch Kehta Hai	Gyan Kapoor	Supporting Role	
2008	Waqt Batayega Kaun Apna Kaun Paraya	Saurav / Jay	Lead Role	
2008–2009	Naaginn – Waadon Ki Agniparikshaa	Arjun Singh	Lead Role	
2008–2009	Grihasti	Inspector Karan	Supporting Role	
2009	Banoo Main Teri Dulhann	Dr. Shashank Malhotra	Supporting Role	
2010	Ganesh Leela	Maharaj Ganraj	Negative Role	
2010	C.I.D. – Khoon Band Darwaze Ke Peeche	Anish	Episode 617	
2010	Thoda Hai Bas Thode Ki Zaroorat Hai	Shreekant Kulkarni	Lead Role	
2010–2011	Rakt Sambandh	Aditya Vaidya	Supporting Role	
2011–2013	Balika Vadhu	Shyam Singh	Supporting Role	
2012–2013	Rishton Ke Bhanwar Mein Uljhi Niyati	Amber Shastri / Siddharth Rao	Lead Role	
2013	Ek Thhi Naayka	Vishal	Episode 1 & 2	
2013	Dil Ki Nazar Se Khoobsurat	Dr. Shekhar Periwal	Lead Role	
2013–2014	Tumhari Paakhi	Girish Bhargav	Supporting Role	
2014–2015	Anudamini	Dev	Lead Role	
2015	Santoshi Maa	Vinayak	Cameo Role	
2015	Darr Sabko Lagta Hai	Alex	Episode 12	
2016	Bhakton Ki Bhakti Mein Shakti	Rishika's Husband	Episode 1	
2016	Bharatvarsh	Adi Sankara		
2016–2017	Baal Krishna	Krishna / Vishnu	Supporting Role	
2017–2019	Paramavatar Shri Krishna	Nanda Baba	Supporting Role	
2018	Kahani Ek Raat Ki – Ek Shaadi Aisi Bhi	Shailesh Kumar		
2018	Kaun Hai?	Abhinav	Episode 21	
2018	Namune	Sharad	Episode 21 & 22	
2019	Crime Alert	Vibhor	Episode 257	
2022	Ghum Hai Kisikey Pyaar Meiin	Rajeev Luthra	Supporting Role	
2022–present	Taarak Mehta Ka Ooltah Chashmah	Taarak Mehta	Lead role	

=== Reality shows ===
Year	Show	Role
2009	Star Vivaah	Guest
2009	Pati Patni Aur Woh	Contestant
2011	Maa Exchange	Contestant

=== Web series ===
Year	Show	Role	Channel	Notes
2020; 2022	Aashram	Hukum Singh	MX Player	Supporting Role
