= Jayati Bhatia =

Indian television actress

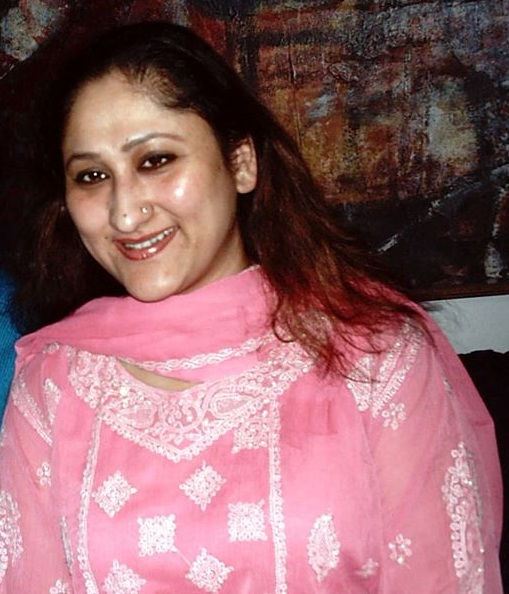
- Bhatia in 2013
- Born: Jayati Chatterjee; 28 July 1970 (age 56); Odisha, India
- Occupation: Actress
- Known for: Sasural Simar Ka
- Spouse: Kiran Bhatia
- Mother: Chhoba Chatterjee
- Relatives: Surajeet Chatterjee (brother); Mitul Chatterjee (sister)

Jayati Bhatia (Bengali pronunciation: [d͡ʒɔjoti]; née Chatterjee; born 28 July 1970) is an Indian actress. She is best known for her role as Nirmala "Mataji" Bharadwaj in Sasural Simar Ka (2011–2018), one of the longest-running Indian television series ever, that aired on Colors TV. She also played Geetanjali Gopichand Oswal in Sasural Simar Ka 2 (2021–2023).

== Personal life ==
Bhatia was born as Jayati Chatterjee into a Bengali household in Odisha, India but moved to Delhi when she was a month old. As a child, she was trained in classical Odissi but has admitted that she finds western dance forms difficult.

Bhatia has two siblings: a brother named Surajeet Chatterjee and a sister named Mitul Chatterjee.

Bhatia met her husband Kiran Bhatia, during her first play and was encouraged by him to be more active on the theatre circuit. In April 2017, on her way to the sets of 'Sasural Simar Ka', Kiran was involved in an argument after which he was beaten up. Bhatia has expressed that she was supported by her mother-in-law and owes much of her success to her.

Bhatia is a supporter of LGBT rights.

== Career ==
=== Television debut and initial days (1996–2007) ===
Bhatia debuted into Hindi television industry in 1995 with Challenge as Khushnuma. In the sitcom Tu Tu Main Main on Star Plus, she essayed Kumud. For the first of many collaborations, she teamed up with producer Ekta Kapoor in Kanyadaan and had a small role in her production Itihaas.

Bhatia began the next century and decade as the wife of Arun Govil's character in Kaise Kahoon on Zee TV. Her next three projects were produced by Kapoor; the first being comedy-drama Kitne Kool Hai Hum. The second one was Sony TV's Kutumb where she played the male lead's aunt Kavita Mittal. In their third consecutive collaboration, she portrayed Geetu Basu in the cult classic daily soap Kasautii Zindagii Kay from 2003 to 2006 for continuously three years.

In 2003, Bhatia was also seen as the titular lead's friend Bindiya in Jassi Jaissi Koi Nahin on Sony TV. In 2005, she was roped in as Titli in Sinndoor Tere Naam Ka on Zee TV. In Zee TV's another venture Mamta, she was cast as Mishti from 2006 to 2007.

=== Film debut, Saas v/s Bahu and Kitchen Champion (2007–2011) ===
By foraying into Bollywood, Bhatia begun her film career with the Sridhar Rangayan-directed drama 68 Pages where she starred as commercial sex worker Payal. It premiered worldwide at the International Film Festival of Kerala and was screened at several international film festivals. For returning to television, she reunited with Kapoor to play Pammi Godbole in Sony TV's rom-com Kuchh Is Tara from 2007 to 2008. For the first time in her career, she signed as a contestant in Sahara One's dance television series Saas v/s Bahu and survived till the finale before winning it.

In 2009, Bhatia enacted the role of Gursheel Malhotra in Star Plus's Sabki Laadli Bebo. Her second film, Raja Krishna Menon's black comedy Barah Aana, released that year. From 2010 to 2011 she portrayed Manju, a loud neighbour in Star Plus's Sasural Genda Phool. Her first project of 2011 turned out as a contestant in the fourth season of cooking based reality show Kitchen Champion hosted by Ronit Roy and Smita Singh; she was declared as winner of the show in finale and thus won a show for the second time, after Saas v/s Bahu.

=== Sasural Simar Ka and beyond (2011–present) ===
In April 2011, Bhatia achieved immense praise for her role in Colors TV's soap opera Sasural Simar Ka where she acted as Nirmala "Mataji" Bharadwaj, the matriarch of the Bharadwaj family. The show became one of the most highest-rated television shows on TRP charts and is among the most longest-running Indian television series, before ending in March 2018 after seven continuous years of production.

Simultaneously along with Sasural Simar Ka shoot, she participated in the fifth season of reality show Jhalak Dikhhla Jaa in June 2012 but was eliminated from it the very next month. That year she voiced for actress Ileana D'Cruz's character in Anurag Basu's comedy-drama Barfi! which was a major financial hit with global earnings of over ₹175 crores. Her next simultaneous appearances with Sasural Simar Ka shoot were in Ananth Narayan Mahadevan's feature film Rough Book and the reality comedy series Comedy Nights Bachao. In 2017, she was seen in the film The Wishing Tree.

Right after the end of Sasural Simar Ka in March 2018, Bhatia joined Star Plus's Naamkarann as antagonist Kamini Kapoor. The show culminated two months later, in May 2018. In August 2018, she began playing another antagonistic part of Roopa Mittal in Colors TV's Internet Wala Love until its wrap up in March 2019. By venturing into OTT, she made her digital debut in 2019 with the horror-comedy Bhoot Purva which streamed on OTT platform ZEE5.

In 2020, Bhatia's first web series project Tansener Tanpura premiered on OTT platform Hoichoi. From August 2020 to January 2021 she worked as Nutan Jaiswal in Star Plus's rom-com Lockdown Ki Love Story. In the second season of web series Girls Hostel that streamed digitally on OTT platform SonyLIV, she starred as a dean.

Bhatia played Geetanjali Gopichand Oswal, a new character in Sasural Simar Ka 2, which premiered on Colors TV and Voot on 26 April 2021 and ended on 7 April 2023.

== Filmography ==
=== Films ===
Year	Film	Role	Notes
2007	68 Pages	Paayal	
2009	Barah Aana	Simone A. Mehta	
2012	Barfi!	Old Shruti Sengupta	Voice over
2015	Rough Book	Rukhsana Ali	
2017	The Wishing Tree	Guriqbal's Mother	

=== Television ===
Year	Serial	Role	Notes
1995	Challenge	Khushnuma	
1996	Tu Tu Main Main	Kumud	
1999	Kanyadaan	Kavita	
2000	Itihaas		
2000	CID	Nupur	Episodes 113–114
2001	Kaise Kahoon	Nasreen	
2001	Kutumb	Kavita Ajay Mittal	
2002	Kitne Kool Hai Hum		
2003–2006	Kasautii Zindagii Kay	Geeta Sanjay Basu	
2003	Jassi Jaissi Koi Nahin	Bindiya	
2005	Sinndoor Tere Naam Ka	Titli Mami	
2006–2007	Mamta	Mishti	
2007–2008	Kuchh Is Tara	Pammi Godbole	
2008	Saas v/s Bahu	Contestant	Winner
2009	Sabki Laadli Bebo	Gursheel Malhotra	
2009	Jo Ishq Ki Marzi Woh Rab Ki Marzi		
2010	Baat Hamari Pakki Hai		
2010–2011	Sasural Genda Phool	Manju	
2011	Kitchen Champion	Herself	Winner of Season 4
2011–2018	Sasural Simar Ka	Nirmala "Mataji" Bharadwaj	
2012	Jhalak Dikhhla Jaa 5	Contestant	12th place
2016	Comedy Nights Bachao	Herself	
2018	Naamkarann	Kamini Sharad Kapoor	
2018–2019	Internet Wala Love	Roopa Purushottam Mittal	
2020–2021	Lockdown Ki Love Story	Nutan Jaiswal	
2021	Sasural Simar Ka 2	Nirmala Bharadwaj "Mataji"	Supporting role
2021–2023	Sasural Simar Ka 2	Geetanjali Gopichand Oswal	Supporting role
2022	Sirf Tum	Geetanjali Devi	Guest
2023	Dil Diyaan Gallaan	Tavleen Bhinder	
2023–2024	Do Chutki Sindoor	Dhanlakshmi Pandey "Dadiya"	
2024–2026	Jaane Anjaane Hum Mile	Sharada Suryavanshi	

=== Web series ===
Year	Show	Role	Notes
2019	Punnch Beat	Miss Gayatri Bose	
2019	Bhoot Purva	Unknown	
2020	Tansener Tanpura	Madhubanti Mishra	
2021	Girls Hostel	Dr. Sarla "Dean" Desai	Season 2
2023	Dahaad	Devaki Bhatti	
2024	Heeramandi	Phatto	

== Plays ==
- Going Solo Part 1
- Mahatma Vs Gandhi
- Mad About Money
- Acid
- Khatijabai of Karmali Terrace
- The Vagina Monologues
- Amavas ke Amaltas
- Salaam, Noni Apa
