= Alesia Raut =

Indian model, VJ, and a fashion choreographer

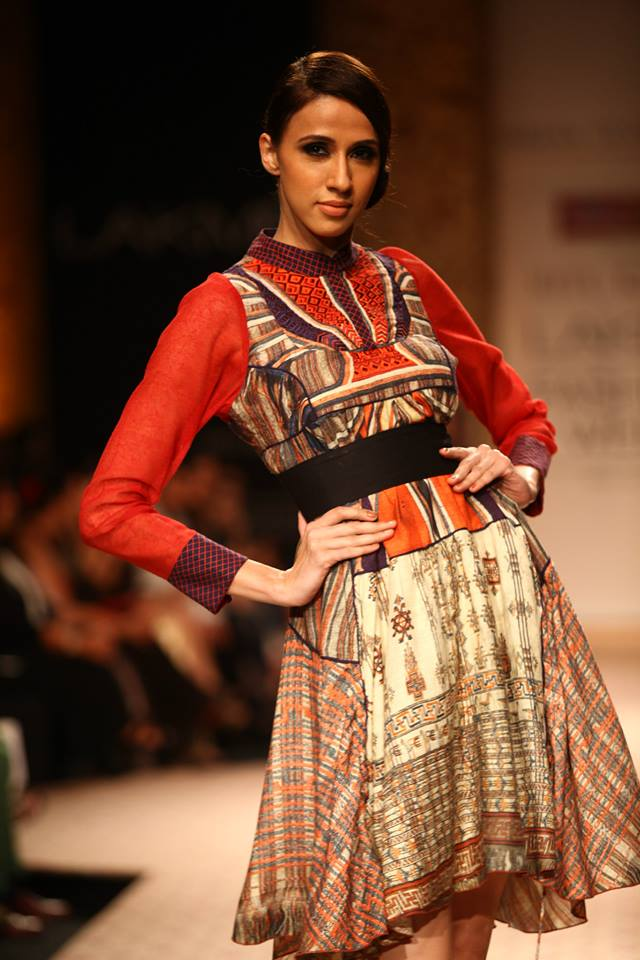
- Raut at Lakme Fashion Week 2013
- Born: Alesia Raut; Soviet Union
- Education: Mithibai College
- Occupations: Model, VJ, choreographer
- Spouse: Alexander Yanovskiy (divorced) Siddhanth Suryavanshi (m. 2017; died 2022)
- Children: 1

Alesia Raut is an Indian model, VJ, and a fashion choreographer. She had anchored a travel show on STAR One. She was a contestant in a TV reality show Fear Factor: Khatron Ke Khiladi (season 4). Alesia had also featured in some item songs such as "Meri Beri ke Ber" and "Ek Aankh Maro". She is the official ramp-walk trainer of Femina Miss India and Miss India Universe pageants.

== Early life ==
Alesia was born in Soviet Union to a Russian mother and an Indian father. She attended Bombay Cambridge Gurukul (Andheri E) and graduated in commerce from Mithibai College in Juhu. She has a sister, Anjali Raut who is a former model in Mumbai and a brother, Amit Raut.

== Personal life ==
Alesia married Alexander Yanovskiy, a Russian based Economist. She moved to its capital but after her marriage failed, she returned to India with their son.

Alesia married television actor Siddhanth Suryavanshi in November 2017. He died on 11 November 2022.

== Modeling career ==
Alesia had never imagined making it into modeling. However a neighbour took some pictures and sent them to the look of year contest 1999, organized by Times Group in India. She became a finalist in the contest. After her divorce, her sister Anjali, who was a well-established model, got her back into contact with some fashion choreographers including Lubna Adams, Noyonika Chatterjee and Marc Robinson. She then restarted her modeling career. She was soon busy, modeling for the prestigious Wills Lifestyle India Fashion Week shows and International Institute of Fashion Design shows. She had done runway in many shows such as Manish Malhotra. She played the role of a model in Madhur Bhandarkar's movie Fashion which stars Priyanka Chopra, Kangana Ranaut, Mugdha Godse and Arjan Bajwa. She was a contestant in Fear Factor: Khatron Ke Khiladi (season 4) hosted by Akshay Kumar. She featured in an item song from the movie Karu Toh Karu Kya and in the music videos "Meri beri ke ber" and "Ek aankh maro".
