= Kyun Rishton Mein Katti Batti =

Indian television series

- Genre: Drama
- Created by: Arvind Babbal
- Written by: Dialogues; Usha Dixit
- Screenplay by: Anjali Bahura
- Story by: Purnendu Shekhar
- Creative directors: Neelakshi Naithani; Mona Raj Ahuja
- Starring: Siddhaanth Vir Surryavanshi; Neha Marda
- Theme music composer: Adil-Prashant
- Country of origin: India
- Original language: Hindi
- No. of seasons: 1
- No. of episodes: 254

Production
- Producers: Arvind Babbal; Rekha Babbal
- Production location: Mumbai, Maharashtra
- Editor: Avadh Narayan Singh
- Camera setup: Multi-camera
- Running time: 22–24 minutes
- Production company: Arvind Babbal Productions

Original release
- Network: Zee TV
- Release: 14 December 2020 – 5 November 2021

Kyun Rishton Mein Katti Batti (English: “Why There is Likeness and Unlikeness Between The Relationship?” ) is an Indian Hindi-language drama television series broadcasting on Zee TV. It premiered on 14 December 2020 and produced by Arvind Babbal. It is starring Siddhaanth Vir Surryavanshi and Neha Marda. It replaced Dil Yeh Ziddi Hai and was later replaced by Tere Bina Jiya Jaye Na.

== Plot ==
This is a story of a married couple who used to be in love and got married without the permission of their parents, they have two kids; a boy and a girl, but the husband has an extramarital affair with a girl named Samaira who is his boss. After the family finds out about it and the son goes into depression, the wife decides to make her own name as she has sacrificed everything for her husband and kids.

== Cast ==
=== Main ===
- Siddhaanth Vir Surryavanshi as Kuldeep Chaddha—Shubhra's husband, Samaira's lover, Roli and Rishi's father (2020–2021)
- Neha Marda as Shubhra Chaddha—Kuldeep's wife, Harsh's love interest, Roli and Rishi's mother (2020–2021)
- Yash Sinha as Dr. Harsh (2021)

=== Recurring ===
- Pratyaksh Panwar as Rishi Chaddha: Kuldeep and Shubhra's son, Roli's brother (2020–2021)
- Mannat Murgai as Roli Chaddha: Kuldeep and Shubhra's daughter, Rishi's sister (2020–2021)
- Sapna Thakur as Samaira: Kuldeep's mistress and Vedika's Biological Mother(2020–2021)
- Himanshu Gokani as Sadashivnarayan Gokhale: Shubhra's father, Kuldeep's father-in-law, Rishi and Roli's grandfather (2020–2021)
- Poornima Bhave Talwalkar as Madhura Sadashivnarayan Gokhale: Shubhra's mother, Kuldeep's mother-in-law, Rishi and Roli's grandmother (2020–2021)
- Geeta Agarwal Sharma as Chandrani Chaddha: Kuldeep's mother, Shubhra's mother-in-law, Rishi and Roli's grandmother (2020–2021)
- Bhagyashree Dalvi as Sanjana: Shubhra's friend and neighbor (2020–2021)
- Gaurav Ghatnekar as Anant :Samira's Ex-boyfriend and vedika's Father and chandrani's tenant (2021)
- Priya Rajpoot as Phirkee: Samaira's maid (2020–2021)

== Production ==
=== Development ===
Arvind Babbal's series was supposed to premiere in March 2020. However, because of the COVID-19 outbreak, the production and filming of the television series were stalled. But, due to imposed lockdown which extended, it could not be resumed. When the shootings of the series were permitted from July 2020, the production and filming of the series resumed and the team decides to release the series in August or October. But after a large delay, the series premiered on 14 December 2020. It produced by Arvind Babbal, who owns the producing studio, Arvind Babbal Productions.

=== Casting ===
It is about a family drama stars Siddhaanth Vir Surryavanshi, who plays Kuldeep, for his role producers wanted him to have a businessman and fatherly look, so the team planned to make him look like a desirable man with a strong physique. Thus began Siddhaanth's transformation, where he had to lose some of his body fat, build abs and gain some muscle. For the same, he went on a diet and worked out regularly for a period of six months and had to commit to play Kuldeep's character. Neha Marda, who plays Shubhra Chaddha, made her comeback after two years in television. The team approached Priyamvada Kant in the role of Samaira. But she was replaced by Sapna Thakur before the series was released. Actress Neha Marda quit the show on 13 October 2021 due to her Personal Issues. The producers decided to take a leap in a show where Neha was supposed to play the role of Her Character's daughter in the show, but when she decided to quit, the producers decided to cancel the show in December 2021.

== Reception ==
Times of India quoted the series that “The series depicts the emotions and happiness between the family”.
