= Jasveer Kaur =

Indian television actress

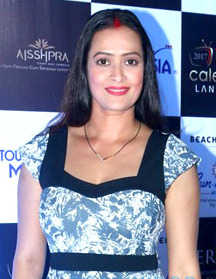
- Kaur in 2017
- Born: Mumbai, Maharashtra, India
- Other name: Jaswir Kaur
- Citizenship: Indian
- Occupation: Actress
- Years active: 1998–present
- Known for: CID; Shakti Astitva Ke Ehsaas Ki; Sasural Simar Ka; Anupamaa; Waaris
- Notable work: CID; Shakti Astitva Ke Ehsaas Ki; Anupamaa
- Spouse: Vishal Madlani (m. 2016)
- Children: 1

Jasveer Kaur, also known as Jaswir Kaur, is an Indian television actress and former backup dancer. She is best known for her role as Sub-Inspector Kajal in CID.

== Filmography ==
=== Films ===
Year	Title	Notes	Language	Notes
1998	Soldier		Hindi	
1999	Baadshah	Air Hostess	Hindi	
1999	Taal		Hindi	
2000	Kaho Naa... Pyaar Hai		Hindi	
2000	Badal		Hindi	
2000	Mohabbatein		Hindi	
2000	Phir Bhi Dil Hai Hindustani		Hindi	
2001	Ek Rishtaa: The Bond of Love		Hindi	
2001	Yaadein		Hindi	
2003	Koi Mil Gaya		Hindi	
2003	Kuch Naa Kaho		Hindi	
2007	Katha Parayumpol		Malayalam	Malayalam film
2017	JD		Hindi	special appearance in the item number "Kamariya Pe Lattu"

=== Television ===
Year	Title	Role(s)	Ref.
2004–2006	K. Street Pali Hill	Shalini/Smriti Gupta	
2006–2009	Ghar Ki Lakshmi Betiyann	Pavitra/Kajribai	
2007–2008	Maayka	Suhani	
	Left Right Left	Simranjeet Kaur	
2008	Mr. & Ms. TV	1st Runner-up	
2008	Ek Se Badhkar Ek – Jalwe Sitaron Ke	Winner	
2008	Saas v/s Bahu		
2010–2012	CID	Inspector Kajal	
2012	Veer Shivaji	Gauhar Khan	
2012–2013	Hitler Didi	Savita Verma	
2013	Savitri		
2013	Navvidhaan	Unknown	
2013	Jay-Veeru	Unknown	
2014	Adaalat	Challenger	
2015	Krishna-Kanhaiya	Gurjeet/Guddu	
2015	Ishq Ka Rang Safed	Bijli Singh	
2015	Gangaa	Shreya Mathur	
2016	Box Cricket League 2	Herself	
2016	Box Cricket League Punjabi	Herself	
2016–2017	Sasural Simar Ka	Rita Sumeet Kapoor	
2017	Waaris	Mohini Harjeet Bajwa	
2020–2021	Shakti – Astitva Ke Ehsaas Ki	Parmeet Santbaksh Singh	
2020–2024; 2025–present	Anupamaa	Devika Mehta	
2022	Gud Se Meetha Ishq	Nimrit Navdeep Shergill	
2023	Ali Baba	Roshni	
2024	Mishri	Chitra Dwivedi	
2025	Gehna – Zewar Ya Zanjeer		
