= Jo Ishq Ki Marzi Woh Rab Ki Marzi =

- Genre: Drama
- Developed by: C.L.Saini
- Written by: C.L.Saini
- Directed by: Amit Malik; Faisal Akhtar
- Starring: See below
- Opening theme: "Jo Ishq Ki Marzi" by Richa Sharma and Kunal Ganjawala
- Country of origin: India
- Original language: Hindi
- No. of seasons: 1
- No. of episodes: 70

Production
- Executive producers: Jyoti Sagar; Shakti Sagar; Shiv Sagar
- Producers: Shubash Sagar; Anand Sagar; Prem Sagar
- Editor: Adil Wassan
- Camera setup: Multi-camera
- Running time: Approx. 24 minutes
- Production company: Sagar Arts

Original release
- Network: Sahara One
- Release: 9 March – 12 June 2009

Jo Ishq Ki Marzi Woh Rab Ki Marzi is an Indian television series that premiered on Sahara One on 9 March 2009. The story revolves around the lives of two 'Zamindar' (rich landlords) families who turn from friends to enemies.

== Cast ==
- Neil Bhatt as Sumer / Veer
- Neha Marda as Sunaina
- Pankaj Kalra as Udayveer (Sumer's father)
- Amit Pachori as Balveer
- Vijay Bhatia as Karamveer
- Jayati Bhatia
