= Deewar (TV series) =

- Created by: Tracinema Venture
- Directed by: Raman Kumar
- Starring: see below
- Opening theme: "Deewar" by Jagjit Singh
- Country of origin: India
- Original language: Hindi
- No. of seasons: 1
- No. of episodes: 260

Production
- Running time: approx. 25 minutes

Original release
- Network: DD National
- Release: 1998 – 2003

Deewar is an Indian television series that aired on DD National channel. The series was also shown on TV Asia channel in the United States.

== Plot ==
The show is based on the story of a guy named Purshottam, who is in jail. He has been in prison for the last ten years. It is said that although his term is a lifer and that means a minimum of fourteen years, there is a possibility of him being released within the next six months. Purshottam is in prison due to his conviction for the crime of murder.

== Cast ==
- Kulbhushan Kharbanda ... Purshottam Singh (Eldest son and the main character, who is in jail)
- Smita Jaykar ... Aparna (Purshottam's wife)
- Amita Nangia ... Pakhi (Purshottam's elder daughter)
- Neha Mehta... Pallavi (Purshottam's younger daughter)
- Anju Mahendru ... Gaaytri (The second wife of Purshottam)
- Susheel Parashar ... Maadhav Pattak (Gayatri's brother)
- Mukesh Khanna ... Vikram Singh (Purshottam's brother, and the other main character)
- Asawari Joshi ... Jaya (Vikram's wife)
- Vaquar Shaikh ... Rahul (Son of Vikram)
- Resham Tipnis ... Pinky (Vikram's daughter)
- Avtar Gill ... Dhanraj Singh (Villain, who is Purshottam's cousin)
- Sanjay Batra ... Jayant (Another Villain)
- Alok Nath ... Krishan Kant (Childhood friend of Vikram)
- Sulabha Arya ... Geeta (Krishan's wife)
- Mamik Singh ... Arjun (Aggressive son of Krishen, who is in love with pinky)
- Anita Kulkarni ... Meera (Krishan's daughter, who would do anything for her parents and married Rahul later)
- Rakesh Bedi ... Goldie (Household's manager---funny and confused)
- Sanjeev Seth... Gautam (Pakhi's lover)
