= Yash Sinha =

Indian television actor

- Born: 20 August; Patna, Bihar, India
- Occupation: Actor
- Years active: 2002–2021
- Spouse: Amrapali Gupta (m. 2012)
- Children: Kabir Sinha (son)

Yash Sinha (born 20 August) is an Indian television actor.

== Filmography ==
Year	Film	Role
2017	Badrinath Ki Dulhania	Aloknath Bansal

== Television ==
Year	Serial	Role	Channel
2002	Bhabhi	Rakesh Chopra	Star Plus
2003–2004	Awaz - Dil Se Dil Tak	Vinay Tiwari	Zee TV
2004	Zameen Se Aassman Tak		Sahara One
2004	Tumhari Disha		Zee TV
2004	Pancham		Zee TV
2005	Chi and Me	Raja	Zee TV
2005–2007	Kituu Sabb Jaantii Hai	Prabhakar	Sahara One
2007	Kaajjal	Ranveer	Sony Entertainment Television
2007–2008	Har Ghar Kuch Kehta Hai	Prem Thakral	Zee TV
2007–2009	Teen Bahuraaniyaan	Rohit Gheewala	Zee TV
2008–2009	Doli Saja Ke	Ishaan Singhania	Sahara One
2009–2010	Bhagyavidhaata	Vimalesh Sinha	Colors TV
2011–2012	Afsar Bitiya	Bablu Singh	Zee TV
2015	Code Red	Kabir	Colors TV
2021	Kyun Rishton Mein Katti Batti	Dr. Harsh	Zee TV

== Personal life ==
Sinha married his co-star Amrapali Gupta on 28 November 2012.
