= Neha Marda =

Indian television actress

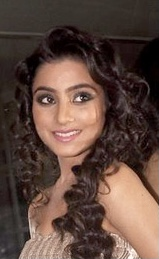
- Marda in 2014
- Born: Kolkata, West Bengal, India
- Occupation: Actress
- Years active: 2004–2021
- Known for: Balika Vadhu; Doli Armaano Ki; Kyun Rishton Mein Katti Batti; Jhalak Dikhhla Jaa
- Spouse: Ayushman Agarwal (m. 2012)
- Children: 1

Neha Marda is an Indian television actress, and entrepreneur. She is well known for her roles in Balika Vadhu, Doli Armaano Ki and Kyun Rishton Mein Katti Batti. In 2015, she participated in Jhalak Dikhhla Jaa.

== Life and career ==
=== 1991–2007: Early life and acting debut ===
Marda was born in either 1985. (Note: An article published by Zoomtventertainment.com on 6 December 2020, specifies her date of birth as 23 September 1991 (age 34). However, an article published by The Times of India on 27 October 2022, quotes her as aged 35, which would mean being born in 1986 or 1987.) She was brought up in a Marwari family in a district town near Kolkata. Neha is a native of Rajasthan.

Marda was first recognized when she participated in Sony TV's Boogie Woogie as a contestant and became the winner in 2004. She was a part of the show when she was 11, 17 and 19 and judged for an episode when she was 21. In 2005, she made her acting debut in Sahara One's Saath Rahega Always. After the show went off air she played Shruti in Ghar Ek Sapnaa.

In 2006, she appeared in Zee TV's Mamta as Simran. In 2007, she acted in Ssshhhh...Koi Hai in an episodic appearance followed by acting in Ekta Kapoor's Kahe Naa Kahe as Manvi.

=== 2008–2015: Breakthrough with Balika Vadhu and Doli Armaanon Ki ===
In 2008, she played the main lead as Priyamvada in Zee TV's Ek Thi Rajkumari opposite Ali Merchant. Marda's breakthrough came when she landed the role of Gehna in Colors TV's longest running show, Balika Vadhu which she played from 2008 until 2011. In 2009, she played the lead in Jo Ishq Ki Marzi Woh Rab Ki Marzi opposite Neil Bhatt. From 2009 until 2010, Marda played the negative role of Pratima in Star Plus's Shraddha.

In 2010, participated in Imagine TV's Meethi Choori No 1. In January 2011, she appeared as a guest contestant in Jhalak Dikhhla Jaa 4 where she was paired with contestant Meiyang Chang. In 2011, she participated in Kitchen Champion 4 and Nachle Ve with Saroj Khan. Marda later acted in shows like Ek Hazaaron Mein Meri Behna Hai (2012) and Devon Ke Dev...Mahadev (2013).

Marda was cast in Zee TV's Doli Armaano Ki, playing the lead role as Urmi Singh Rathore, a victim of domestic violence and abuse at the hands of her abusive husband, Samrat which became popular among audience. opposite Mohit Malik. In 2015, Marda quit the show getting replaced by Manasi Salvi. The show ended on 25 September 2015.

=== 2015–2021: Jhalak Dikhhla Jaa and further projects ===
In September 2015, after leaving Doli Armaano Ki, Marda participated in Colors TV's dance reality show Jhalak Dikhhla Jaa in its eighth season. She entered as a wild card entrant along with Anita Hassanandani and Roopal Tyagi. She, along with her choreographer Rajit Dev had got eliminated after two weeks. In 2016, she participated in Box Cricket League 2 where she joined Karan Wahi's team, 'Delhi Draggons'. In 2017, she appeared as a guest contestant in Fear Factor: Khatron Ke Khiladi 8 for the teen ka tadka special week and performed along with Hina Khan.

In 2018, she joined Zee TV's Piya Albela playing Bella. Later she appeared in an episodic role of Genda in &TV's Laal Ishq opposite Sartaj Gill. In 2019, she participated in Khatra Khatra Khatra. Since 2020, Marda has been playing the lead role as Shubhra in Zee TV's Kyun Rishton Mein Katti Batti opposite Siddhaanth Vir Surryavanshi. Neha Quit Kyun Rishton Mein Katti Batti on 13 October 2021 due to her Personal Issues.The makers decided to take a leap in a show where Neha was Supposed to play the role of her Character Shubra's daughter in the show but when she decided to quit the makers decided to cancel the show in December 2021.

== Other work ==
On 1 July 2018, she founded an academy in Patna known as the Royal Opera House Academy(ROHA) that provides training in dance, drama and singing to performing arts enthusiasts.

Neha Marda is popularly known as 'Gehna' for her role in the Balika Vadhu series. In an interview, Neha said, "she watched the CDs of Bandit Queen to get into the skin of her character Gehna in Balika Vadhu."

Marda is the founder of Phitku, a deodorant brand which received an investment offer of ₹1.8 crore (US$190,000) from judges of Shark Tank India season 5.

== Personal life ==
On 10 February 2012, in Kolkata, she married Ayushman Agrawal, a Patna-based businessman, The couple have a daughter born in 2023.

== Television ==
Year	Title	Role	Notes	Ref.
2004	Boogie Woogie	Contestant		
2005	Saath Rahega Always	Pihu		
2005	Ghar Ek Sapnaa	Shruti		
2006	Mamta	Simran		
2007	Ssshhhh...Phir Koi Hai	Pallavi	Episode 23	
2007	Kahe Naa Kahe	Manvi		
2008–2012	Balika Vadhu	Gehna Basant Singh/ Gehna Niranjan Singh		
2008	Ek Thi Rajkumari	Priyamvada		
2009	Jo Ishq Ki Marzi Woh Rab Ki Marzi	Sunaina		
2009	Laughter ke Phatke	Guest		
2009–2010	Shraddha	Pratima		
2010	Meethi Choori No 1	Contestant		
2011	Jhalak Dikhhla Jaa 4	Herself	Guest	
2011	Bigg Boss 4	Herself	Guest	
2011	Ratan Ka Rishta	Herself	Guest	
2011	Kitchen Champion 4	Contestant		
2011	Just Dance	Contestant	Co-choreographer of winner Ankan Sen	
2011	Star Ya Rockstar	Contestant		
2011	Nachle Ve with Saroj Khan	Contestant		
2012	Ek Hazaaron Mein Meri Behna Hai	Ishita		
2013	Devon Ke Dev...Mahadev	Vrinda		
2013–2015	Doli Armaano Ki	Urmi Samrat Singh Rathore		
2014	Dance India Dance 4	Urmi Samrat Singh Rathore	Guest appearance	
2014	Kumkum Bhagya	Urmi Samrat Singh Rathore	Guest appearance	
2014	Pavitra Rishta	Urmi Samrat Singh Rathore	Guest appearance	
2015	Jhalak Dikhhla Jaa 8	Contestant	Wild card	
2016	Box Cricket League 2	Contestant	Player in Delhi Dragons	
2018	Piyaa Albela	Bella		
2018	Laal Ishq	Genda		
2020–2021	Kyun Rishton Mein Katti Batti	Shubhra Chaddha		
2021	Kundali Bhagya	Shubhra Chaddha	Guest appearance	
2021	Meet: Badlegi Duniya Ki Reet	Shubhra Chaddha	Guest appearance	

== Awards and nominations ==
Year	Award	Category	Show	Result
2014	Indian Television Academy Awards	GR8! Performer of the Year – Female	Doli Armaano Ki	Nominated
