= Bhabhi (TV series) =

Indian television series (2002)

- Written by: Rajesh Beri; R M Joshi
- Directed by: Amitava Bhattacharya; Ravi Raj; Gurudev Bhalla; Vikram Ghai; Amitabh Sinha
- Opening theme: "Bhabhi" by Udit Narayan and Indira Menon; "Rang Mile" by Shreya Ghoshal
- Country of origin: India
- Original language: Hindi
- No. of episodes: 1328

Production
- Executive producer: Suprita Purkayastha
- Producers: Ronnie Screwvala; Zarina Mehta
- Editor: Manish Mistry
- Running time: 23 minutes

Original release
- Network: StarPlus
- Release: 18 March 2002 – 23 May 2008

Bhabhi (transl. Sister-in-Law) is an Indian Hindi language soap opera which aired on StarPlus from 18 March 2002 to 23 May 2008 during weekday afternoons. The series was produced by UTV Software Communications.

== Overview ==
Saroj is forced to assume the mantle of the daughter-in-law and give solace to Tilak's mother. She manages to save her life but is devastated at her loss. The adulation, love and total acceptance from each member of the family numbs her so completely that she decides, for the moment, to accept her position as "Pushpa bhabhi".

== Cast ==
- Neha Mehta / Dolly Sohi as Saroj Tilak Chopra (2002) / (2002–2006; 2007)
- Joy Sengupta / Manish Goel / Mukul Dev as Tilak Chopra (2002) / (2002–2004; 2004–2006) / (2004)
- Bhanujeet Sudan as Nihal
- Puneet Sachdev as Vishal "Vishwa" Chopra
- Tejal Shah / Mandeep Bhandar as Guddo Chopra
- Rakesh Paul / Rushad Rana as Sukhi Uppal
- Rucha Gujarathi / Kanchi Kaul / Rucha Gujarathi as Suhana Seth / Suhana Vishal Chopra / Suhana Dev Thakral (2005–2007) / (2007–2008) / (2008)
- Eijaz Khan as Sohan, Nihal and Dr. Megha's Son
- Gaurav Khanna as Bhuvan Sareen
- Vishal Singh as Dr. Dev Thakral
- Kinshuk Mahajan as Kamal Thakral, Dev and Suhana's Son
- Abir Goswami as Bhairav
- Sharad Kelkar as Advocate Kunal
- Shilpa Shinde as Manju Chatterjee (Before plastic surgery)
- Payal Nair as Manju Chatterjee (After plastic surgery) / Meenakshi Chatterjee / Meenakshi Tilak Chopra
- Sonia Singh as Sushma "Sush" Vishal Chopra
- Shabir Ahluwalia as Sushant
- Prachi Shah as Seema
- Gurdeep Kohli as Geetanjali Sabharwal / Geetanjali Dev Thakral
- Nazneen Patel as Dr. Megha
- Pooja Bhatia as Rishika Thakral / Rishika Samar Kapoor
- Pariva Pranati as Alpa Seth / Alpa Bhuvan Sareen / Alpa Shubham Chopra
- Aashka Goradia as Seema
- Mahesh Thakur as Vivek Seth
- Shoma Anand as Reshma Baldev Chopra
- Amit Tandon as Nihal
- Yash Sinha / Rahil Azam / Manav Kaul as Rakesh Chopra: Baldev and Reshma's younger son; Tilak's younger brother; Dinanath's younger grandson; Sunaina's husband (2002) / (2002–2004) / (2004–2005) (Dead)
- Dharmesh Vyas / Dharam Taneja as Kukku Chopra (2002) / (2002–2008)
- Neelu Kohli as Nanda Kukku Chopra
- Sunny Moza as Rahul
- Pulkit Nanavati as Dapinder
- Monty Patel as Vicky
- Manmeet Chopra as Raju
- Shivshakti Sachdev as Mehak Thakral
- Yatin Karyekar as Mr. Thakral
- Niyati Joshi as Savitri Thakral
- Poonam Joshi as Rishika Thakral / Rishika Samar Kapoor
- Tarun Khanna as Samar Kapoor
- Rohit Roy as Raj Malhotra / Devansh Mehra
- Arundev Sharma as Veeru
- Mohit Raina as Shubham Chopra
- Swapnil Joshi as Dr. Prakash Thakur
- Raymon Singh as Sunaina Uppal / Sunaina Rakesh Chopra
- Pankaj Berry as Jagdish Uppal
- Prakash Ramchandani as Sudarshan
- Manish Khanna as Advocate Gandhi
- Priyanka Tiwari as Mandira
- Rupali Ganguly as Roshni Prem Khanna
- Puneet Vashisht as Prem Khanna
- Hans Dev Sharma Chamman Laal
- Nimai Bali as Radheshyam
- Mukesh Khanna as Advocate Rathore
- Poonam Gulati as Kamini
- Nikhil Guharoy as Sunil Saxena
- Karishma Randhawa as Soni
- Yashodhan Rana as Siddharth
- Anand Goradia as Tanakesh
- Yusuf Hussain as Dinanath Chopra: Baldev and Kukku's father; Tilak and Rakesh's grandfather (2002–2003) (Dead)
- Nikhhil R Khera as Sushma's Boyfriend / Fiancée
- Varun Badola as Varun Badola (Special appearance)
- Sanjay Mitra

== Production ==
Neha Mehta playing Saroj quit the series on issues with the production house and Dolly Sohi replaced her. Dolly Sohi who quit the series owing her marriage, re-entered the series in January 2007. When Sohi quit, Rucha Gujarati became the lead who also quit in September 2007 when she was to age after a generation leap in story and was replaced by Jayshree Rao.

On 17 August 2006, the series had a special wedding episode with cast from few other StarPlus series then attending the wedding sequence.
