= Saath Rahega Always =

- Genre: Drama
- Created by: Urban Brew Studios
- Directed by: Himanshu Consul
- Starring: see below
- Country of origin: India
- Original language: Hindi
- No. of seasons: 1
- No. of episodes: 91

Production
- Camera setup: Multi-camera
- Running time: 24 minutes

Original release
- Network: Sahara One
- Release: 28 November 2005 – 3 April 2006

Saath Rahega Always is an Indian television series based on all matters within the premises of college from typical college atmosphere, mature girl, funky and modish dude to the jealous or scheming friend. The show premiered in India on Sahara One on 28 November 2005.

== Plot ==
Peehu, Krish, Soham, and Palakh are longtime best friends despite their dissimilar personalities and goals. They spend most of their time in the college canteen.

== Cast ==
- Neha Marda as Pihu Bhargav
- Karan Rai / Sachin Verma as Krish Oberoi
- Karan Veer Mehra as Soham Mehta
- Shilpa Shinde as Pihu Bhargav
- Rishina Kandhari as Palak
- Amit Dua as Lalit
- Rahul Lohani as Nitin
- Jatin Shah as Shikhar
- Girish Jain as Avi
