= Amrapali Gupta =

Indian television actress

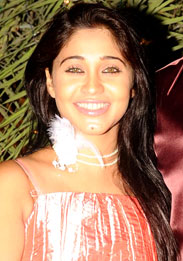
- Amrapali Gupta in 2016
- Other name: Amrapali Yash Sinha
- Occupation: Actress
- Years active: 2000–present
- Known for: Teen Bahuraaniyaan; Qubool Hai; Nach Baliye
- Height: 5 ft 2 in (1.57 m)
- Spouse: Yash Sinha (m. 2012)
- Children: Kabir Sinha (son)
- Relatives: Megha Gupta (sister); Additi Gupta (sister)

Amrapali Gupta, also known as Amrapali Yash Sinha, is an Indian television actress best known for her role in the Indian television series Qubool Hai.

== Personal life ==
Gupta is married to her co-star Yash Sinha from Teen Bahuraaniyaan on 28 November 2012. They have one son together.

== Filmography ==
=== Television ===
Year	Serial	Role
2001	Suraag – The Clue	Liza Joseph (Episode 105)
2001	Suraag – The Clue	Anu Agarwal (Episode 114)
2002–2009	Ssshhhh...Koi Hai	Episode 32
2002–2009	Ssshhhh...Koi Hai	Episode 45
2002–2009	Ssshhhh...Koi Hai	Shabana (Episode 48)
2002–2009	Ssshhhh...Koi Hai	A girl whose boyfriend gets murdered by Vineet Singh (Episode 49)
2002–2009	Ssshhhh...Koi Hai	Episode 57
2002–2009	Ssshhhh...Koi Hai	Priya (Episode 6)
2002–2009	Ssshhhh...Koi Hai	Kanishka (Episode 13)
2002–2009	Ssshhhh...Koi Hai	Nandini (Episode 35)
2002–2009	Ssshhhh...Koi Hai	Radha (Episode 68 & Episode 69)
2002–2009	Ssshhhh...Koi Hai	Devyani (Episode 188 & Episode 189)
2002–2009	Ssshhhh...Koi Hai	Kalika / Ambika (Episode 210 - Episode 221)
2002–2004	Krishna Arjun	Kanta (Episode 3 & Episode 4)
2002–2004	Krishna Arjun	Malini (Episode 98 & Episode 99)
2003–2004	Vikraal Aur Gabraal	Shabana (Episode 4)
2003–2004	Vikraal Aur Gabraal	Episode 25
2003–2004	Vikraal Aur Gabraal	Episode 33
2003–2004	Vikraal Aur Gabraal	Girl Whose Boyfriend Gets Murdered By Vineet Singh (Episode 35)
2003–2004	Khushiyaan	Khushi
2003–2004	Shaka Laka Boom Boom	Kitty
2004	Aakrosh	Saroj
2004	Hatim	Chhaya
2004	Raat Hone Ko Hai	Episode 61 - Episode 64
2004–2005	Reth	Aarushi Pandey
2004–2005	Hey...Yehii To Haii Woh!	Manju Kamath
2004–2005	Chi and Me	Liza
2005	Anant	Episode 7
2006	Mamta	Masooma Srivastav
2006	Woh Rehne Waali Mehlon Ki	Tanya Thapar
2006	Pyaar Ke Do Naam: Ek Raadha, Ek Shyaam	Ginno
2006	Raaz...Ki Ek Baatt	Trisha
2006	Banoo Main Teri Dulhann	Radha
2006	Vaidehi	Varsha
2006	C.I.D.	Naina (Episode 442)
2006–2007	Kashmakash Zindagi Ki	Tanushree (Tanu)
2007	Durgesh Nandinii	Sugandhi
2007	Doli Saja Ke	Riya
2007–2009	Teen Bahuraaniyaan	Bindiya Rohit Gheewala
2008	Ek Se Badhkar Ek	Contestant
2010	Agnipareeksha Jeevan Ki – Gangaa	Vedika
2010–2011	Koi To Ho Ardhnarishwar	Vartika
2011–2012	Neem Neem Shahad Shahad	Sonali
2012	Imtihaan	Seema
2012	Fear Files: Darr Ki Sacchi Tasvirein	Karnapisachini (Episode 24)
2012	Savdhaan India	Jyoti (Episode 90)
2012–2013	Tujh Sang Preet Lagai Sajna	Sonali
2013	Nach Baliye 6	Contestant
2013	Devon Ke Dev...Mahadev	Matsya Kanya
2013–2015	Qubool Hai	Tanveer (Billo Rani) / Tanveer Raza Ibrahim
2015	Qubool Hai	Shashi Kapoor / Fake Misbah Sayed
2015	Killerr Karaoke Atka Toh Latkah	Contestant
2015	Ummeed - Nayi Subah Ki	Vasudha
2015–2016	Adhuri Kahaani Hamari	Anamika
2017	Ishqbaaaz	Kamini Khurana / Kamini Singh Randhawa
2017	Dil Boley Oberoi	Kamini Khurana / Kamini Singh Randhawa
2018	Kaleerein	Black Magic Performer
2018	Tujhse Hai Raabta	Madhuri Verma
2018	Kaun Hai?	Diti (Episode 34 - Episode 41)
2019	Vish Ya Amrit: Sitara	Kalindi
2019	Bahu Begum	Suraiya Asgar Mirza
2019–2020	Tujhse Hai Raabta	Mamata Verma
2022	Naagin 6	Rani Sahiba Triloksundari (Basant Panchami Special Episode)
2022	Gud Se Meetha Ishq	Chhavi Satyakam Rawat
2023	Meet: Badlegi Duniya Ki Reet	Shagun Jeetesh Chaudhary
2024	Rabb Se Hai Dua	Kaynaat Akhtar Siddiqui
2026	Mannat – Har Khushi Paane Ki	Samragyi Rajvanshi
