= Ek Se Badhkar Ek: Jalwe Sitaron Ke =

- The "Ek Se Badhkar Ek" logo.
- Created by: UTV Software Communications
- Presented by: Ravi Kishan (7 June – 27 July); Mandira Bedi (2 August – 14 September)
- Opening theme: "Ek Se Badhkar Ek"
- Country of origin: India
- No. of episodes: Total 28

Production
- Running time: 52 minutes

Original release
- Network: Zee TV
- Release: 7 June – 14 September 2008

Related
- Rock-N-Roll Family

Ek Se Badhkar Ek – Jalwe Sitaron Ke is a Hindi television reality show that aired on Zee TV channel, starting from 7 June 2008 to 14 September 2008. The show is a unique because it has both singing and dancing in a one platform. The show is replaced by its second season known as Chota Packet Bada Dhamaka, which is based on kids.

== Concept ==
The show has a total of 16 stars who will participate in this show in a total of 8 jodis. Each pair will comprise one dancer and one singer. These teams will then appeal to the viewers for votes in order to win the coveted title of "Sabse Badkar Jodi". The elimination will be decided based on marks given by judges and audience voting.

Champs from the music world, Aneek Dhar, Raja Hasan, Harpreet, Emon, Amit Paul, Poonam, Sumedha and Sanchita along with television celebrities Kushal Punjabi, Shayantani Ghosh, Apoorva Agnihotri, Rajshri Thakur, Abhishek Awasthi, Purbi Joshi, Jasveer Kaur and Amrapali Gupta will team up to set the show on fire.

Host

- Mandira Bedi ... Current host (2 August to 14 September)
- Ravi Kishan ... Ex-host (7 June to 27 July)

Judges

- Abhijeet Bhattacharya
- Ahmed Khan

== Contestants ==
Originals

- Jodi No.1: Sanchita Bhattacharya & Kushal Punjabi
- Jodi No.2: Emon Chatterjee & Purbi Joshi
- Jodi No.3: Raja Hasan & Jasveer Kaur
- Jodi No.4: Harpreet Deol & Amrapali Gupta
- Jodi No.5: Aneek Dhar & Sayantani Ghosh
- Jodi No.6: Sumedha Karmahe & Abhishek Avasthi
- Jodi No.7: Amit Paul & Rajshree Thakur
- Jodi No.8: Poonam Yadav & Apurva Agnihotri

Wildcard Entrants

- Jodi No.1: Aishwarya Nigam & Aanchal Dwivedi
- Jodi No.2: Mussarat Abbas & Sanober Kabir
- Jodi No.3: Meenal Jain & Abhishek Avasthi

NOTE: Contestants are listed in pairs (1 singer along with 1 Indian TV celebrity).
NOTE: Contestant Abhishek Awasthi who got eliminated on 12 July has returned through wildcard entry with a new partner Meenal Jain NOT Sumedha Karmahe.
NOTE:In week 11 (16 & 17 August), both of the judges score are counted (one day the total score will was out of 20 points per contestant, and the other day it was out of 10 points per contestant), so the total score per week was out of 60 points (30 points per contestant).
NOTE:In week 12, the total score was 50 points per contestant, 40 points for the first performance individually done by both of the contestants [20 points each], and the second performance was worth 10 points. However, the elimination that took place was out of 20 points, in which Shayantani's team received 17/20 and Abhishek's team received 18/20.
NOTE:In Week 13, the total score was of 80 points per contestant (40 points for Friday & 40 points for Saturday). On Saturday, being on 'TOP' Jasveer's jodi didn't have to perform, so their total was out of 40 points, but the other two jodi's who were in danger-zone had to perform. After the performances, both Abhishek's & Kushal's jodi's had a tie, so the decision of elimination was made with the help of audiences votes.

Score Cards

Scores:		Week 1	Week 2	Week 3	Week 4	Week 5	Week 6	Week 7	Week 8	Week 9	Week 10	Week 11	Week 12	Week 13	Week 14	Finale
Place	Jodi's	Result														
01	Raja / Jasveer	N/A	13/20	13/20	16/20	15/20	16/20	17/20	16/20	17/20	19/20	45/60	36/50	29/40; Top/80	(14/20)	Winner
02	Sanchita / Kushal	N/A	11/20	15/20	16/20	16/20	18/20	16/20	20/20	19/20	18/20	53/60	43/50	63/80	(14/20)	Runner up
03	Meenal / Abhishek							17/20	19/20	14/20	17/20	47/60	38/50	(63/80); Elim		
04	Aneek / Shayantani	N/A	14/20	14/20	15/20	15/20	18/20	16/20	19/20	18/20	18/20	49/60	(17/20); Elim			
05	Mussarat / Sanober							15/20	15/20	16/20	14/20	(12/20); Disqualified				
06	Amit / Rajshree	N/A	9/20	12/20	12/20	14/20	12/20	14/20	15/20	(0/20); Quit						
07	Aishwarya / Aanchal							12/20	(16/20); Elim							
08	Sumedha / Abhishek	N/A	11/20	12/20	15/20	14/20	(17/20); Elim									
09	Harpreet / Amrapali	N/A	10/20	13/20	11/20	(14/20); Elim										
10	Emon / Purbi	N/A	12/20	11/20	(15/20); Elim											
11	Poonam / Apurva	N/A	10/20	(14/20); Elim												

*Note:The elimination is based on the performances on Saturday (last week) and Friday (the following week); the 2 Jodi's that are in danger zone than perform on Friday and the elimination takes place. The judges' votes, combined with the viewers' votes determine elimination.
*Note:There was no elimination in week 10 because of the "tie" between the two bottom jodi's (Aneek & Shyantani AND Sanchita & Kushal).
*Note::: In week 11, Sanober & Mussarat's jodi was disqualified because Sanober didn't show up to perform on the show. Though Mussarat gave a solo performance and received a total of 12 points out of 20 on Saturday (16 August), but since Sanober didn't show up the jodi was eliminated.

== Guests appearance ==
- Week 4: Jackie Shroff & Salil Chadda to promote the movie Thodi Life Thoda Magic.
- Week 5: Priyanka Chopra & Harman Baweja to promote the movie Love Story 2050.
- Week 6: Vivek Oberoi to promote the movie Mission Istanbul.
- Week 7: Manoj Bajpai, Ganesh Acharya, & Hansika Motwani to promote the movie Money Hai Toh Honey Hai.
- Week 10: Katrina Kaif & Vipul Shah to promote the movie Singh Is Kinng.
- Week 11: Tusshar Kapoor to promote the movie C Kkompany.
- Week 12: Sunny Deol & Bobby Deol to promote the movie Chamku. (Saturday: 23 August)
- Week 12: Shiney Ahuja to promote the movie Hijack. (Sunday: 24 August)
- Week 14: Khushi Dubey & Tanmay Chaturvedi (kids star) came and performed as they will be the contestants' of the next season of Ek Se Badhkar Ek known as 'Chota Packet Bada Dhamaal'.
- Week 15:Grand-Finale
  1. Shoaib Akhtar & Esha Deol
  2. Laxmi & Rohan of Ghar Ki Lakshmi Betiyann
  3. Ranbir & Rano of Ranbir Rano (new Zee TV show)
  4. Participants (kids) of next season of Ek Se Badhkar Ek known as Chota Packet Bada Dhamaal

== Controversy ==
Abhijeet bhattacharya made bad comments of Pakistani sensation Atif Aslam and asked the contestants not to sing his songs on stage. He remarked that he (Atif Aslam) used software for his songs. This made Abhijeet Bhattacharya's popularity to go to an all-time low.

== Other information ==
- Abhishek Awasthi was presented the best dancer award among other nominees, such as Rajshree Thakur & Shayantani Ghosh.
- Jasveer Kaur and Raja Hasan were the winner of Ek Se Badhkar Ek and won Rs.25 Lakhs.
