= Kammal =

Indian drama television series

- Created by: Balaji Telefilms
- Directed by: Santosh Bhatt
- Creative director: Nivedita Basu
- Starring: See Below
- Opening theme: "Kammal" by Mahalakshmi Iyer ""O Rahi" by Priya Bhattacharya
- Country of origin: India
- Original language: Hindi
- No. of seasons: 1
- No. of episodes: 152

Production
- Executive producer: Rashmi Sharma
- Producers: Ekta Kapoor; Shobha Kapoor
- Cinematography: Shabbir Naik
- Running time: 24 minutes
- Production company: Balaji Telefilms

Original release
- Network: Zee TV
- Release: 1 July 2002 – 20 March 2003

Kammal is an Indian television soap opera which debuted in 2002 on Zee TV. The story is based on the life of Kammal, a woman of substance. The series was produced under Balaji Telefilms.

== Plot ==
The story portrays the life of a young girl, Kammal (Keerti Gaekwad Kelkar), who was brought up by three bar dancers. These women, against tremendous odds, raise Kammal to be a woman of immense grace and beauty. The story takes a major twist, when a rich guy (played by Sandeep Baswana) from a well-known family falls in love with Kammal. Despite his family being against this marriage proposal, he marries Kammal. What follows is a gut-wrenching drama of love, deception, faith and betrayal. At every step of her life, Kammal is put to test by her own loved ones to prove her integrity, and yet every time she proves to be innocent and loyal.

== Cast ==
- Keerti Gaekwad Kelkar as Kammal Manav Jajoo
- Sandeep Baswana as Manav Jajoo
- Ashlesha Sawant as Anita Bhatia / Anita Manav Jajoo
- Pratima Kazmi as Rama
- Ronit Roy as Swayam Jajoo
- Amita Chandekar as Tripti Swayam Jajoo
- Moonmoon Banerjee as Shaina Bose
- Neena Kulkarni / Zarina Wahab as Raina Bose / Rini Sanyal
- Abir Goswami as Satya Jajoo
- Jaya Bhattacharya as Devvrati "Debu" Jayantilal Jajoo
- Zahida Parveen as Shabnam "Shabbo"
- Richa Nayyar as Rita
- Prashant Bhatt as Yash Jajoo
- Kali Prasad Mukherjee as Jayantilal Jajoo
- Dolly Sohi as Manya Jajoo
- Rajendra Chawla as Narayan Jajoo
- Mugdha Shah as Jigna Narayan Jajoo
- Pratap Sachdev as Viraj's Father
- Sachin Shroff as Viraj
- Amit Varma as Sameer Bose
- Kamya Panjabi as Vidisha
- Kavita Kaushik as Rushali
- Kishwer Merchant as Nisha Yash Jajoo
- Manish Khanna / Prithvi Vazir as Rajesh Bhatia
- Sudeep Sahir as Ranveer
- Sumukhi Pendse as Sonali
- Faizan Kidwai
- Alka Kaushal
