= Kabhi Haan Kabhi Naa (TV series) =

Hindi television series

- Written by: Vinay Choudary
- Directed by: Bhushan Patel
- Starring: see below
- Music by: Abhijeet Hegdepatil.
- Opening theme: "Kabhi Haan Kabhi Naa" by Gaurav Issar
- Country of origin: India
- No. of seasons: 1
- No. of episodes: 112

Production
- Producer: Shrishti Arya
- Running time: 22 minutes

Original release
- Network: Zee TV
- Release: 8 November 2004 – 19 May 2005

Kabhi Haan Kabhi Naa is a Hindi television comedy-drama series that aired on Zee TV channel from 8 November 2004 to 19 May 2005. The story deals with three guys having a distinctly different take on love, life and relationships.

== Plot ==
The story is based on the lives of three boys. All three have many different ways of attracting girls. Aditya "Adi" is always in search of his dream girl which keeps changing daily. This is the reason he keeps an empty photo frame in his room. He is a perfect gentleman and a very romantic kind of guy who works in his own company, but does nothing since everything is taken care of by his brother. All he does is go to his office and sit in his cubicle with a very cute secretary and then go home. He sometimes escorts visiting delegates, especially if they are female.

Chetan is flirt; handsome and very good looking. He works in an ad agency, but always makes others, especially women, do the work for him. He does not believe in love. His is always a "wham bam, thank you mam" kind of relationship. But he falls in love with a girl who is already engaged.

Deepankar is completely out of shape and has a sister who wants to marry him off before he gets spoiled by his friends. He works in a bank. He is always afraid of his sister who is an IAS officer.

Even though all these boys are apart from each other in their personality and style, they are best friends who help each other setting up girls.

== Cast ==
- Mihir Mishra as Aditya "Adi"
- Kushal Punjabi as Chetan
- Vishal Singh as Deepankar
- Dimple Inamdar as Ananya
- Muskaan Mihani as Sanjana
- Gaurav Chopra as Kabir Jairath
- Satyajit Sharma as Kartik
- Payal Nair as Vandana
- Tarana Raja as Devika
- Divya Jagdale as Vishakha
- Kiku Sharda as Jay
- Sonia Kapoor as Avantika
- Suhasi Goradia Dhami as Samantha "Sam"
