= Dollar Bahu =

Indian television series

- Written by: Samarth Patki
- Directed by: Ajai Sinha; Ravi Kemmu
- Starring: see below
- Opening theme: Dollar Bahu by Sudha Murty
- Country of origin: India
- Original language: Hindi
- No. of seasons: 1
- No. of episodes: 40

Production
- Producer: Sunil Hali
- Running time: 25 minutes

Original release
- Network: Zee TV
- Release: 1 September 2001 – 1 June 2002

Dollar Bahu (lit. 'Dollar daughter-in-law') is an Indian Hindi-language television series that aired on Zee TV channel in 2001. The series is based on a novel, Dollar Bahu by Sudha Murty. The story portrays the struggle of a middle-class family to graduate into an upper-class one through their son in the USA. Besides, as the title refers, the series was shot in both India as well as in the United States. In addition, when the serial's shooting began in the USA, the September 11 attacks occurred.

== Overview ==
The story is about two daughters-in-law of a family, one from America and the other one from India. Now, how their mother-in-law treats them (Rupees and Dollar) is uncovered. The story is more of the mother-in-law who thinks that her American daughter-in-law (dollar bahu) is better than her counterpart in India, since she lives in the land of dreams, USA. Henceforth, she desires to live with her son in America. However, when she lives a year or so in America, she realises that the Indians living there face the same problems and challenges as those of living in India. Now she realise that "grass always looks greener on the other side". And when she comes back to India, she shows immense love to the first daughter in law whom she felt to be a trash and her grandson. Finally after getting a slap on feelings by her dollar bahu, Gouramma understands the fact that, may be dollar can remove the poverty from one's life. But family is much more important than that of dollars.

== Cast ==
- Neha Mehta as Vaishali
- Chandni Toor Roy as Charushekar
- Himani Shivpuri as Master Govind's Wife (Mother-In-Law)
- Salman Noor as $lash (Dollar Bae)
- Ismail Bashey as Shekhar (Eldest Son of Master Govind)
- Rakesh Pandey as Master Govind (Father-In-Law)
- Ranjeet as RK
- Suhasini Mulay as Lakshmi
- Mayuri Kango as Rini (RK and Lakshmi's daughter)
- Deepak Parashar as Javed
- Kunika as Zubeida
- Aashish Kaul as Rahul
- Tina Parekh as Jyoti
- Raj Roy as Joe
