= Eidak =

Eidak عیدک شمالی وزیرستان Idak
- Village
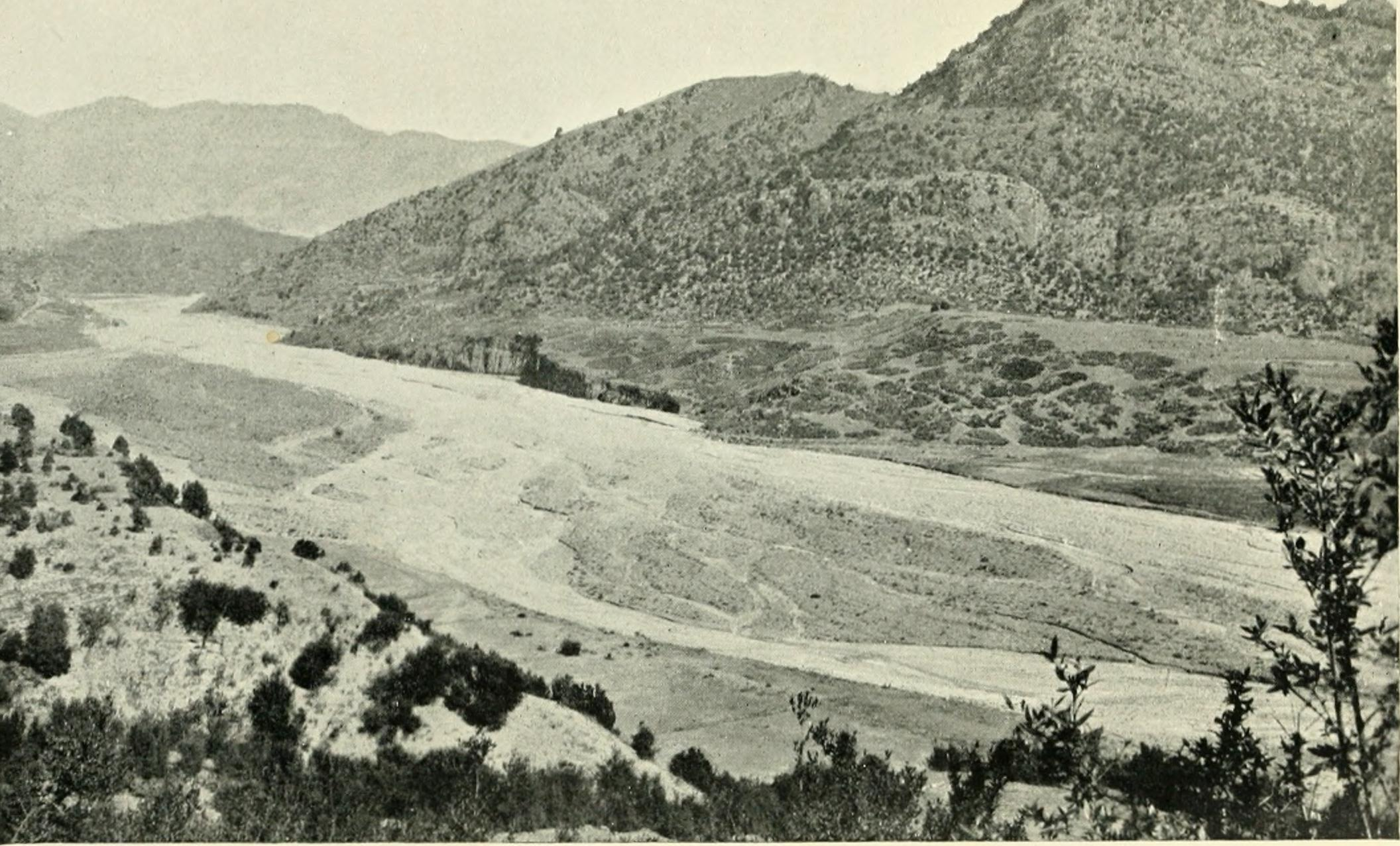
- Tochi Valley in 1912

- Location within Khyber Pakhtunkhwa
- Coordinates: 32.9741°N 70.1988°E
- Country: Pakistan
- Province: Khyber Pakhtunkhwa
- District: North Waziristan
- Tehsil: Mir Ali
- Founded: 1910
- Founder: Haji Mir Zali Khan

Government
  - Councillor: Ali Noor Jan
  - Malik: Muhammad Danir
- Elevation: 731 m (2,398 ft)

Population (2017)
  - Total: 22,724
- Demonym: Eidaak عیداک
- Time zone: UTC+5 (PST)
- Postal code: 28191
- Area code: 0092-928-220

Eidak (also known as Idak, Pashto: ادک or عیدک) is a village in the North Waziristan District of Bannu Division, Pakistan, 50 kilometres (30 miles) to the east of Bannu, lying close to the border with Afghanistan. Its inhabitants are mainly Pashtun-speaking Dawaris.

== History ==
In 1896, during the Tochi Expedition, the British set up a military post in the village as part of its defences against raids from the Waziris.

=== War in Waziristan ===
As part of the ongoing War in Waziristan, the region has become swallowed up by conflicts between Taliban-aligned groups and the Pakistani government. In 2009, it was reported that a prominent independent militia group led by Maulana Manzoor Dawar had its support base in the village. The group was said to have had around 300 members and had much foreign support to the dismay of other militias in the area.

=== Operation Zarb-e-Azb ===
In June 2014, Pakistani government forces launched an offensive (Operation Zarb-e-Azb) against extremist groups which had infiltrated the region. As a result of the conflict, many peoples of North Waziristan were displaced from their lands and migrated towards Khyber Pakhtunkhwa.

Due to local co-operation with the military, in July 2015, villagers were allowed to return to their homes once the local threat had been neutralised.
