= Neha Mehta =

Indian television and film actress (born 1978)

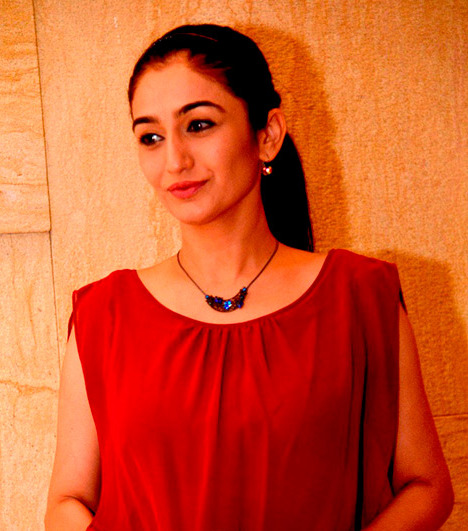
- Mehta in 2016.
- Born: 1 April 1978 (age 48); Patan, Gujarat, India
- Occupation: Actress
- Years active: 2001–present
- Known for: Taarak Mehta Ka Ooltah Chashmah; Dollar Bahu; Bhabhi

Neha Mehta (born 1 April 1978) is an Indian actress primarily known for her work in Gujarati cinema, and Hindi television. Mehta is best known for her portrayal of "Anjali Mehta" in India's longest-running sitcom, Taarak Mehta Ka Ooltah Chashmah (2008–2020). Her other prominent television appearances include as Vaishali in Dollar Bahu (2001–2002), and Saroj Chopra in Bhabhi (2002).

== Early life and education ==
Her ancestrally belongs to Patan, Gujarat, India but was brought up in Vadodara and Ahmedabad. She comes from a family that has deep roots in Gujarati literature and she herself is a Gujarati speaker. Her father is a popular singer who inspired her to become an actress. She holds a Master's degree in Performing arts (MPA), in Indian Classical Dance, and a Diploma in Vocal and drama.

== Career ==
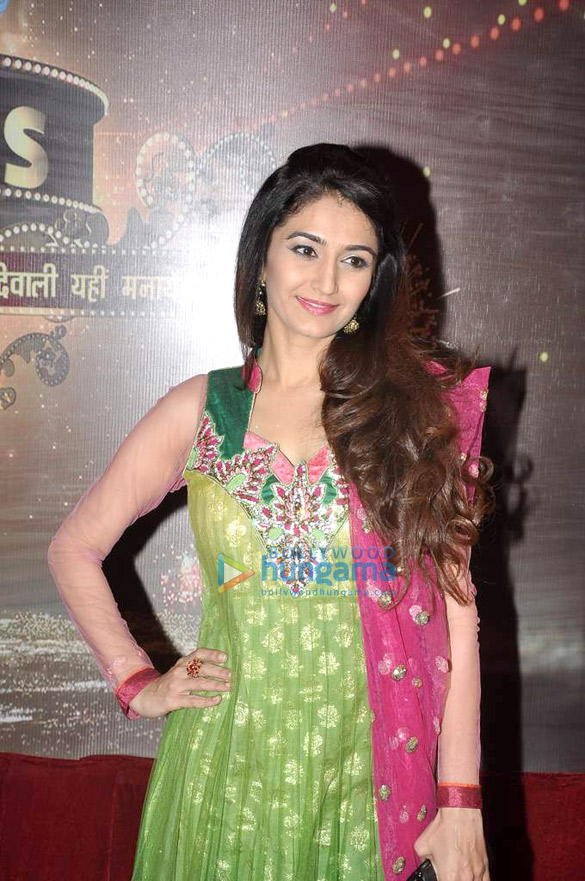
Mehta at ITA Awards, 2013

Mehta did Gujarati theatre for many years, with Sahebji being one of her notable work. Mehta made her acting debut in 1998 with Deewar. Her first lead role came with Zee TV's Dollar Bahu in 2001, where she played Vaishali. From 2002 to 2003 she played the title role of Saroj Chopra in STAR Plus TV serial Bhabhi. She played the role of Kushik in Raat Hone Ko Hai in 2004.

From 2008 to 2020, Mehta portrayed a dietician Anjali Mehta in SAB TV's longest running sitcom series Taarak Mehta Ka Ooltah Chashmah, opposite Shailesh Lodha. Her character is married to the narrator of the show and is a young, sophisticated modern woman. The show earned her national recognition. Mehta left the show in 2020, after 12 years.

From 2012 to 2013, she hosted SAB TV's Wah! Wah! Kya Baat Hai! with Shailesh Lodha. She has also played the lead role in the Gujarati films Janmo Janam, Chahera Par Moharu, Better Half and Halkie Fulkee, and the Bhojpuri film Dosti Dushmani Aur Pyar.

== Filmography ==
=== Films ===
Year	Title	Role	Ref.
2001	Janmo Janam	Suman	
2007	Chahera Par Moharu	Mallika	
2008	EMI	Prerna's friend	
2010	Better Half	Kamini	
2019	Dosti Dushmani Aur Pyar	Radha	
2021	Halkie Fulkee	Aneri	

=== Television ===
Year	Title	Role	Ref.
1998–2003	Deewar	Pallavi Singh	
2000	Ghar Ek Mandir	Sharon	
2001	Dollar Bahu	Vaishali	
2002	Bhabhi	Saroj Tilak Chopra	
2002	Sau Dada Sasu Na	Anuradha	
2004	Raat Hone Ko Hai	Kushik	
2005	Mera Dil Deewana	Pushpa	
2008–2020	Taarak Mehta Ka Ooltah Chashmah	Anjali Taarak Mehta	
2012–2013	Wah! Wah! Kya Baat Hai!	Host	
2025–2026	Itti Si Khushi	Hetal Diwekar	

=== Theatre play ===
Year	Title	Role	Language	Ref.
2009	Sahebji	Unknown	Gujarati	
2023	Dil Abhi Bhara Nahi	Vaidehi	Hindi	
