= Sinndoor Tere Naam Ka =

Indian drama television series

- Created by: Jay Production
- Written by: Kamlesh Kunti Singh Shashi Mittal; Sumit Mittal; Zama Habib
- Directed by: Yash Chauhan; Abhishek Dudhaiya; Santosh Bhatt; Manoj Krishanater
- Starring: See below
- Opening theme: "Sindoor Tere Naam Ka" by Pamela Jain
- Country of origin: India
- Original language: Hindi
- No. of seasons: 1
- No. of episodes: 521

Production
- Producers: Jay Mehta; Kinnari Mehta
- Running time: approximately 24 minutes
- Production company: Jay Production

Original release
- Network: Zee TV
- Release: 21 March 2005 – 6 April 2007

Sinndoor Tere Naam Ka is an Indian television series that aired on Zee TV at 7:30pm from 21 March 2005 to 6 April 2007 completing 521 episodes.

== Plot ==
The story is based on the lives of two sisters, Niharika (Keerti Gaekwad Kelkar) and Vedika (Gurdeep Kohli). Vedika is a mentally unstable young woman who fears the traditional sindoor. Vedika's sister, Niharika, agrees to marry a disabled man named Antariksh (Pracheen Chauhan) on the condition that Vedika marry his younger brother. She marries a sane man named Dhruv (Sachin Shroff). The subsequent events in their lives, along with the fortunes of their family members, form the crux of the story.

== Cast ==
- Gurdeep Kohli as Vedika Agarwal / Vedika Dhruv Raizada
- Aashka Goradia as Arpita Prasad / Arpita Kunal Rathore / Arpita Dhruv Raizada
- Keerti Gaekwad Kelkar as Niharika Agarwal / Niharika Antariksh Raizada / Niharika Rudra Raizada / Niharika Shivam Kapoor
- Pracheen Chauhan as Antariksh Raizada
- Gunn Kansara as Kajal Antariksh Raizada
- Sachin Shroff as
  - Dhruv Raizada
  - Karan Raizada (Oberoi) (2006)
- Tanvi Azmi / Kiran Juneja as Kavita Virendra Raizada
- Sharad Kelkar as Rudra Raizada
- Naresh Suri as Virendra Raizada
- Shweta Gautam as Tara Raizada / Tara Rahul Malhotra
- Kishori Shahane as Uma Agarwal, Niharika and Vedika's mother
- Jayati Bhatia as Titli, Rajan's wife
- Gulrez Khan as Advocate Aarti Sabharwal / Aarti Dhruv Raizada
- Tanushree Kaushal as Bulbul, Titli's elder sister
- Rohit Bakshi as Suraj, Vedika's ex-boyfriend
- Sachin Sharma as Shivam Kapoor, Niharika's third husband
- Gunjan Walia as Naina Kothari, Kajal's younger sister
- Aanchal Anand as Alisha, Karan's girlfriend
- Anand Suryavanshi as Rahul Malhotra, Niharika's ex-boyfriend
- Faraaz Khan as Dr. Shantanu Sengupta
- Sumukhi Pendse as Sundari,
- Kapil Soni as Police Inspector
- Dinesh Mehta as Police Inspector
- Iqbal Azad as Rajan, Kavita's brother
- Vineet Raina as Titli Mami's son
- Rahul Lohani as Kunal Rathore, Arpita's ex-husband
- Sulabha Arya as Sumitra Rathore
- Shashi Kiran as Pandit Bhavani Prasad
- Swati Anand as Urvashi Oberoi, Kavita's younger sister
- Usha Bachani as Pamela Singhania
- Kanika Maheshwari as Sneha
- Garima Kapoor as Nandita Kapoor, Shivam's younger sister
- Diwakar Pundir as Ayushmaan Malhotra
- Gulfam Khan as Firdaus
- Pratima Kazmi as Savita
- Swati Chitnis as Shalini Malhotra
- Unknown as Sudeepa Sengupta
- Unknown as Angoori (Virendra's elder cousin sister)
- Naveen Saini as Shekhar, Sneha's boyfriend
- Prashant Bhatt
- Amardeep Jha as Chitralekha
