= Kitne Kool Hai Hum =

- Genre: Comedy; Sitcom
- Created by: Balaji Telefilms
- Developed by: Ekta Kapoor
- Directed by: Kapil Kapoor
- Starring: Jayati Bhatia; Shoma Anand; Darshan Jariwala; Anurag Prappana
- Country of origin: India
- Original language: Hindi
- No. of seasons: 1
- No. of episodes: 160

Production
- Producers: Ekta Kapoor; Shobha Kapoor
- Production locations: Mumbai, Maharashtra, India
- Camera setup: Single-camera
- Running time: Approx. 24 minutes
- Production company: Balaji Telefilms

Original release
- Network: Zee TV
- Release: 15 April 2002 – 13 February 2003

Kitne Kool Hai Hum (translation: How cool are we) is an Indian comedy drama television series created and co-produced by Ekta Kapoor and Shobha Kapoor under their banner Balaji Telefilms. The series premiered on 15 April 2002 on Zee TV.

== Plot ==
The series revolves around the Chapanaria family who lives in Dhanduka village in rural Gujarat. The series explores how they become millionaires when they receive millions from the will of their grandfather. The series traces their day to day experiences which turn into comedy when they shift from their rural village to the posh city of Mumbai.

== Cast ==
- Jayati Bhatia
- Shoma Anand
- Darshan Jariwala
- Anurag Prapanna
- Aashish Kaul
- Rucha Gujarathi
- Karishma Tanna
- Anand Goradia
- Kusumit Sana
- Dheeraj Sarna
