= Yoga for You =

Indian television series

Yoga for You is a television series produced by Urban Brew Studios and broadcast from India on the Zee TV network Lamhe. The television station was fined 25,000 pounds in 2017 due to false cancer-related claims made by Pankaj Naram on the show, and the station subsequently stopped showing it.
