= Teen Bahuraaniyaan =

- Promotional image
- Also known as: The Three Daughters-in-Law
- Created by: Playtime Creationn
- Written by: R M Joshi, Mites Shah, Nikhilesh sharma, Kapil Bavad and Harsa Jagdish.
- Directed by: Swapna Joshi, Pawan Kumar, Nandita Mehra and Bhagwan Yadav
- Starring: see below
- Narrated by: Paresh Rawal
- Opening theme: "Teen Bahuraniyaan" by Navin Tripathi and Madhushree
- Country of origin: India
- Original language: Hindi
- No. of episodes: 371

Production
- Executive producers: Mohan Pandey & Pavni Mehandiratta
- Producers: Paresh Rawal, Swaroop Sampat & Hemal Thakker
- Running time: approximately 24 minutes

Original release
- Network: Zee TV
- Release: 26 March 2007 – 9 January 2009

Teen Bahuraniyaan (International title: Three Daughters-in-Law) is a 2007 Indian television series depicting the story of three daughters-in-law of different cultural backgrounds living as a family in one house. The series was broadcast on Zee TV.

== Concept ==
Teen Bahuraniyaan is a tale of three bahus (daughters-in-law) — Manjeet (Payal), Bindiya, and Janki; who come from different backgrounds and now live under one roof with the Gheewala parivar (family). They are an upper-class Gujarati joint family living in Ahmedabad. Their lives pass through distinct ups and downs as they share different equations and are at different levels with their in-laws and other family members. Keeping alive their personal interests the bahuraniyaas tackle day-to-day affairs in their own way and manner. They manage to fight against what is wrong and prove themselves worthy of the Gheewala parivar. The daughters-in-law attempt to maintain peace in the family but face challenges from outside and within, particularly from their mother-in-law, whose selfish behavior threatens to destroy the unity and peace.

Within this seriousness, each episode usually features a great deal of comedy, making the show appealing to a wide range of audience.

== Plot ==
The married couples are Rohit and Bindiya; Sameer and Janki; Mahesh and Manjeet (Payal)

Teen Bahuraniyaan takes a major twist, when Mahesh marries Payal, after the death of Manjeet due to blood cancer. As Kajal (Payal's sister) was going to marry Mahesh, the report was out that she was pregnant with someone else's child. Mahesh ended up marrying Payal, Kajal's younger sister. Kajal was furious and commits suicide. However, her spirit comes back and start to make the Gheewala family and especially Bindiya and tries to make Payal's life as hell. She occupies Bindiya's body and she tortures her so much that Bindiya was scared to death and before her target was only the Gheewala family. As Kunjbala (her bhua) took Payal's side, she got even furious and tries to kill her as well but the thaaveez (a note added to a thread and that is blessed by God) saves her. After the incident, the family call Trikal Baba and, with his help, they trap Kajal's evil spirit. After all the havoc, the three couples decide to go on a holiday trip but are unaware that they are being followed by terrorists. A grand mask party takes place. All couples are dancing to the song "Darde disco". Sameer, Rohit, and Mahesh go to get some drinks when a huge bomb blast happens. Janki screams and sees two dead bodies wearing watches just like the one Sameer was wearing. She faints and is taken to the hospital. The whole family rushes to see her. There they find Payal, Bindiya, and Janki. Two of the sons are dead, but they don't know which ones.

The bodies of the sons are burnt by G kaka. The people who come for the prayers tell the Geewala family that the daughters-in-law should be here and they should from now on only wear white saris as they are widows. Janki, Payal, and Bindiya arrive wearing red saris and heavy jewelry. Everyone is shocked. The three say that they won't wear white saris until it is found out who is dead and who isn't. Indira, Kokila, and Bhavna support their daughters-in-law. The bahuraniyaans go to the 'mandir'. Janki gets into an accident and that is where they reveal Sameer is alive.

Sameer gets up; he has lost his memory. Janki is trying to explain that Sameer is alive, but no one wants to believe her. Janki has a sixth sense and can find out the future. She saves Bindiya from a falling chandelier. She sees a mandir and Sameer running. She also sees Payal in a white sari gagged and tied up. All of these come true. Later she sees a wedding and Bindiya getting married again. Bhavna and Kokila think Janki finally went crazy and try to set her straight. Sameer breaks into the Gheewala house not knowing it is his home. Janki tries to catch him, but Sameer runs away. She tells Bhavna, and Bhavna gets mad. Janki goes to Bindiya's room to persuade her to mary Jatin because then Sameer would return home. Bhavna brings people from the mental asylum to take Janki away; Bindiya stops them. Bindiya is ready to marry and everybody is shocked.

Jatin and Shaguna's real identity comes to face at the marriage venue and they run away from the police. Everyone is happy to see Sameer as he told the truth about Shaguna and Jatin. Sameer swears to bring Rohit and Mahesh back. Everyone is praying when all three sons return and a new life starts in Gheewala parrivar, but G kaka is dead. The family receives money in the mail. Bindiya tells everyone that she is thinking about buying a car with that money; the family is saying that they will need that money later. Bindiya, Janki, Bhavana and Payal say that they want to buy a new car. The bahuraniyaan decide to contribute money for the car: Bindiya gives 1 lakh and so does Janki. Payal refuses and says that she has saved the money for something else.

Payal needs the money to get an operation for Mahesh. Everyone chips in and said that instead of buying a car they will help Mahesh. Janki sees a guy taking pictures of the house. Mithi Baa says not to worry. Janki again sees the same car, but this time Manhar comes out of it with the guy from the day before. It's Diwali and everyone's doing the puja. Someone comes to meet Manhar. Janki goes behind the screen and hears everything. Manhar wants to sell Mithiba mansion.

Manhar tells Hari and Kanti. They are hesitant. Bindiya and Bhavna go to Mumbai for a shoot that Bindiya has. When Indira and Kokila find out about selling the house, they want it. Now people are saying that they need Sunanda's permission. Kokila secretly gets Sunanda's signatures by saying that they are for G kaka's bank accounts. They realize that people need to meet her in person. Kokila and Indira make a plan to pretend to send Mithiba and Sunanda on a religious journey. Manhar Kanti and Hari take them to the bus stop and leave them there. It is discovered that they are outside a nursing home and that is where they must stay. The guy comes to see Sunanda, and Kokila comes down dressed as her. Janki sees but keeps quiet. Sameer, Rohit, Mahesh, Payal, and Janki are trying to get their parents to tell them what they are planning because they want to hear it for themselves. Indira tells Sameer, and his trust is broken. They then make a plan to try and stop the sale. The buyer is called to the house by the kids. Payal calls Kokila. Kokila comes and the guy realizes that Kokila was pretending to be Sunanda! He leaves.

Indira and Kokila get mad at the bahus; the sons say that they planned the whole thing. They are speechless. Kokila gets a call from Manhar who says that the buying of the house was cancelled. Kokila and Indira call Bhavna from Mumbai. Both Bindiya and Bhavna come. Maharanis want to get revenge. They get Bindiya fired from her job. There is news that Janki's dad is sick; she goes to him. Maharanis insults Payal and Bindiya in front of their friends. Sameer goes to the nursing home to make a donation. He accidentally leaves his phone behind. Sunanda gets the phone and knows that Sameer came. Rohit calls Sameer to find out where he is. Sameer sees a lady answering his phone. All is revealed when Sunanda turns around and sees Sameer. Mithiba tells Sameer what has happened. Rohit is listening because the phone has not been disconnected. Sameer goes home without them because Sunanda says she doesn't want the sons to be ashamed of what they did. Bindiya, Payal, and Mahesh find out what happened. The three young sons go to their fathers and tell them that they know, that they are ashamed of them, and that they should get Mithiba and Sunanda back.

In the last episode, Sunanda and Mithiba are back. Manhar, Kanti and Hari sell papad. Their wives, Kokila, Indira, and Bhavna do different things. Bhavna works in serials, Kokila takes care of the pepper business, and Indira cooks for the family. The three younger daughters-in-law Janki, Bindiya, and Payal are all pregnant. Their husbands are feeding them because they are pregnant. They all live happily ever after.

== Cast ==
=== Main ===
- Amrapali Gupta as Bindiya Rohit Gheewala (2007-2009)
- Kadambari Kadam as Janki Desai / Janki Sameer Gheewala (2007-2009)
- Manava Naik as Manjeet Mahesh Gheewala (2007-2008)
- Aanchal Anand as Payal Mahesh Gheewala (2008-2009)
- Mehul Kajaria (2007) / Yash Sinha as Rohit Gheewala (2007-2009)
- Manish Raisinghan as Sameer Gheewala (2007-2009)
- Prashant Chawla (2007-2008)/ Abhay Vakil as Mahesh Gheewala (2008-2009)

=== Recurring ===
- Deepak Gheewala as Gopaldas Gheewala (2007-2008)
- Jyotsna Karyekar as Mithi Ba (2007-2009)
- Meghna Roy as Sunanda Gopaldas Gheewala (2007-2009)
- Deepak Pareek as Manhar Gheewala (2007-2009) - Sameer's father
- Meenakshi Sethi as Indira Manhar Gheewala (2007-2009) - Sameer's mother
- Anurag Prapanna (2007-2008)/ Aayam Mehta (2008-2009) as Kanti Gheewala - Mahesh's father
- Nimisha Vakharia as Kokila Kanti Gheewala (2007-2009) - Mahesh's mother
- Jaydutt Vyas as Hari Gheewala (2007-2009) - Rohit's father
- Swati Shah as Bhavna Hari Gheewala (2007-2009) - Rohit's mother
- Aman Verma as Sumit Desai - Janki's father (2007-2008)
- Anang Desai (2007) / Pankaj Dheer (2007-2008) as Dwarkadas
- Vaishali Thakkar as Maya Gheewala (2007)
- Simple Kaul as Nisha Jalan (2007)
- Iqlaq Khan as Mr. Jalan (Nisha's husband)(2007)
- Smriti Irani as Vrinda Desai - Janki's aunt (2007-2008)
- Shubhavi Choksey as Kunjbala - Aunt of Payal and Kajal(antagonist turned as protagonist)(2008)
- Soni Singh as Kajal - Payal's elder sister (2008)
- Rupa Divetia as Meenaben (2008) - Payal and Kajal's mother
- Chhavi Mittal as Advocate Kanika Vajpayee (2008)
- Hemant Thatte as Jatin (2008)
- Siddharth Vasudev as Aniruddh (2008-2009)
- Himesh Reshammiya as himself on episode 54, to promote Aap Kaa Surroor - The Real Luv Story, sung and performed Yeh Tera Mera Milna
