= Love Marriage (TV series) =

- Written by: Mohanjit Singh; Loveleen Mishra
- Directed by: Manisha Sharma
- Starring: see below
- Opening theme: "Love Marriage" by Inakshi Singh and Rani Padmini
- Country of origin: India
- Original language: Hindi
- No. of episodes: 64

Production
- Producer: Mohanjit 'Mozez' Singh
- Running time: 24 minutes
- Production company: Metamozez Entertainment

Original release
- Network: Zee TV
- Release: 29 July – 14 November 2002

Love Marriage is a Hindi-language television series that aired on Zee TV channel in 2002. The series highlights the interesting relations in an urban society. The series is an Indian version of American television series Sex and the City.

== Synopsis ==
A story told through 4 beautiful young women, who driven by circumstances, land in Bombay with the hope of realising their dreams, "Love Marriage". They start to live together making adjustments and compromises they hadn't planned for. As they begin to settle, their professional lives take off in different directions. However, when the line between their professional and personal lives starts to blur, the real drama begins.

== Cast ==
- Aditi Ghorpade as Anu
- Kanchan Mirchandani as Meera
- Sheeba Chaddha as Sonali
- Tisca Chopra as Kiran
- Apara Mehta as Mrs. Dixit
- Mamik Singh as Ravi Shah
- Kushal Punjabi
- Atul Kumar
- Pracheen Chauhan
- Tuhina Vohra
- Meghna Malik
- Sunil Mattoo
- Shashi Puri
- Aamir Dalvi
- Sanjay Gandhi
- Rahul Vora
- Raman Trikha
