= Kaarvan Kismat Ka =

- Genre: Reality television
- Developed by: Zeal Television
- Presented by: Jaaved Jaffrey

Original release
- Release: 29 July 2002

Kaarvan Kismat Ka is an Indian reality game show series that premiered on Zee TV on 29 July 2002. The series aired every Monday at 10:30pm IST, and was hosted by known television actor Jaaved Jaffrey. The series is an Indian adaption of the UK game show The Treasure Trail produced by Chatterbox Productions.
