= Kaise Kahoon =

- Written by: Nawab Arzoo
- Directed by: Shiv Shyam Tripathi; Javed Sayyed
- Starring: see below
- Opening theme: "Kaise Kahoon" by Mahalaxmi Iyer
- Country of origin: India
- Original language: Hindi
- No. of seasons: 1
- No. of episodes: 106

Production
- Producers: Sattee Shourie; Mona Kapoor; Archana Shourie
- Running time: 23 minutes

Original release
- Network: Zee TV
- Release: 5 February – 7 August 2001

Kaise Kahoon is an Indian soap opera telecast on the Hindi general entertainment channel, Zee TV in 2001. The series is produced by Mona Shourie Kapoor who is known from her earlier projects on DD National channel, and stars the Bollywood actor Rahul Roy in the main lead. The story revolves around two close friends from different communities whose friendship extends to their families. But due to certain misunderstandings and having opposing views in members of the two families, they begin to drift apart.

== Concept ==
The plot tackles two main issues – a lesson on how people of different communities can live together peacefully and second about the role of women in society. The story portrays the lives of two best friends, Zahir Ahmed and Sudhir Sinha. Despite their trust and respect for each other, there are people who resent their friendship and want to drive a wedge between them.

== Cast ==
- Arun Govil as Zaheer Ahmed
- Jayati Bhatia as Nasreen, Zaheer's wife
- Sudhir Mitthoo as Sudhir Sinha
- Rahul Roy as Feroze, Zaheer's brother who returns from abroad
- Jaya Bhattacharya
- Sudha Chandran
- Vijayendra Ghatge
- Phalguni Parekh
- Rakesh Pandey
- Bharti Jaffry
- Mohan Joshi
- Reema Lagoo
- Anil Dhawan
- Amita Nangia
- Sadiya Siddiqui
- Rijoy Anand
- Ravi Kiren
- Damini Kanwal

== Reception ==
In UK, due to a quick ending of Kaise Kahoon, the viewers of Zee TV channel were really offended, and believed that the series was discontinued by the channel; however, in response, the channel said that the series was shown in full.

== See also ==
Mona Shourie Kapoor
