= Kanwar Dhillon =

Indian actor (born 1993)

Kanwar deep Dhillon
- Born: 15 March 1993 (age 33); Mumbai, Maharashtra, India
- Occupation: Actor
- Years active: 2012–present
- Known for: Na Bole Tum Na Maine Kuch Kaha; Do Dil Ek Jaan; Piya Rangrezz; Pandya Store; Udne Ki Aasha
- Partner: Alice Kaushik
- Parent: Deep Dhillon (father)

Kanwar Dhillon (born 15 March 1993) is an Indian actor who primarily works in Hindi television. Dhillon is widely recognised for his portrayal of Shiva Pandya in Pandya Store and Sachin Deshmukh in Udne Ki Aasha. Dhillon is a recipient of several accolades including two Indian Telly Awards.

Dhillon made his acting debut with The Buddy Project, portraying Kunal in 2012. His first major appearance came with Na Bole Tum Na Maine Kuch Kaha 2, where he portrayed Aditya Vyas Bhatnagar. His other notable work include portraying Vidhaan Nayak in Do Dil Ek Jaan and Arjun Singh in Piya Rangrezz.

== Early life and background ==
Dhillon was born on 15 March 1993 in Mumbai, Maharashtra, into a Sikh Jat Punjabi family, to Deep Dhillon and Radha Dhillon. His father is a film and television actor, known for his work in Ghayal and Mahabharat. He has an elder brother named Karan Dhillon.

== Career ==
=== Debut and breakthrough (2012-2015) ===
Dhillon made his acting debut with The Buddy Project in 2012. He portrayed Kunal, a college student in the second season of the series. Dhillon's first major role was with his portrayal of Aditya Vyas Bhatnagar, a revengeful son in the second season of Na Bole Tum Na Maine Kuch Kaha in 2013, opposite Pallavi Gupta. The series proved as a major turning point in his career and became his breakthrough.

From 2013 to 2014, he portrayed Vidhaan Nayak in Do Dil Ek Jaan, opposite Shritama Mukherjee. In 2014, he portrayed Kartik, a criminal in Yeh Hai Aashiqui, opposite Mrinalini Tyagi and portrayed Varun Lal in an episode of Halla Bol, the same year. Dhillon portrayed Shivprasad Mishra, a family oriented man in Hum Hain Na opposite Pratyusha Banerjee, from 2014 to 2015. In 2015, he portrayed Lucky in an episode of Pyaar Tune Kya Kiya and appeared as a Guest on Killerr Karaoke Atka Toh Latkah.

=== Career progression (2016-2020) ===
Dhillon portrayed Arjun Singh, post the leap in Piya Rangrezz from 2015 to 2016, alongside Gaurav S Bajaj and Narayani Shastri. In 2017, he portrayed the dual role of brothers Shiv Aggarwal and Om Aggarwal in Ek Aastha Aisi Bhee, opposite Tina Ann Philip. Shiv was a religious man, Om wanted to destroy his family. In the same year, he portrayed Surya in an episode of Aye Zindagi, alongside Aakanksha Singh.

In 2018, Dhillon first played for Kota Royals Rajasthan in Box Cricket League 3. He then portrayed Sangram in an episode of the series Laal Ishq, opposite Yashashri Masurkar. He next portrayed Samrat Murushottam Mittal, an obsessive lover in Internet Wala Love, opposite Tunisha Sharma. In 2020, he portrayed an army officer in the music video Yaad Baarish Mein, opposite Sonal Pradhan. From 2019 to 2020, Dhillon took a break from television due to his health issues.

=== Success with Pandya Store and beyond (2021–present) ===
From 2021 to 2023, Dhillon portrayed Shiva Pandya in Pandya Store opposite Alice Kaushik. The show earned him wider recognition and praises. Dhillon was Nominated for ITA Award for Best Actor Popular and Indian Telly Award for Best Actor in a Supporting Role nominations for his performance. In 2021, he also hosted Star Plus's special segment Pyar Ka Pehla Nasha, as Shiva with Kaushik. It featured the top ten romantic moments of the year 2021, starring couples of Star Plus's shows. In 2022, Dhillon reprised Shiva Pandya in the game show Ravivaar With Star Parivaar. He is currently playing the lead role of Sachin Deshmukh in Star Plus's serial Udne Ki Aasha opposite Neha Harsora.

== Personal life ==
In July 2022, Dhillon revealed that he has been dating his Pandya Store co-actor Alice Kaushik, since April 2021.

Of their relationship, Dhillon said, "It was a gradual process and not instant. We shared beautiful chemistry on screen, which eventually transformed into real chemistry. Unknowingly, we are similar to our characters — Shiva and Raavi. Finally, I found that there was more to our connection. Our bond strengthened when we shot through the second lockdown away from our families in Bikaner."

=== Injuries ===
Dhillon suffered a leg fracture in December 2019, due to which he could not get any work during lockdown. In 2022, while shooting for Pandya Store, he had a dislocated shoulder, fracture and muscle tear.

== Filmography ==
=== Television ===
Year	Title	Role	Notes	Ref.
2012	The Buddy Project	Kunal		
2013	Na Bole Tum Na Maine Kuch Kaha 2	Aditya "Addu" Vyas Bhatnagar / Munna		
2013–2014	Do Dil Ek Jaan	Vidhaan Nayak		
2014	Yeh Hai Aashiqui	Kartik	Episode: "Objection! I Love Him!"	
2014	Halla Bol	Varun Lal		
2014–2015	Hum Hain Na	Shivprasad "Bunty" Mishra		
2015	Pyaar Tune Kya Kiya	Lucky	Season 6, Episode 9	
2015–2016	Piya Rangrezz	Arjun		
2017	Aye Zindagi	Surya	Episode 13	
2017	Ek Aastha Aisi Bhee	Shiv Aggarwal / Om Aggarwal		
2018	Laal Ishq	Sangram	Episode: "Main Phir Bhi Tumko Chahunga"	
2018	Internet Wala Love	Samrat Murushottam Mittal		
2021–2023	Pandya Store	Shiva Pandya		
2022	Ravivaar With Star Parivaar	Shiva Pandya	Episodes 1/6/7/8/9/10/11/12/13/14/15/16	
2024–present	Udne Ki Aasha	Sachin "Sacha" Deshmukh		

==== Special appearances ====
Year	Title	Role	Ref.
2014	Kaun Banega Crorepati	Shivprasad "Bunty" Mishra	
2015	Killerr Karaoke Atka Toh Latkah	Himself	
2021	Pyar Ka Pehla Nasha	Shiva Pandya / Host	
2024	Baatein Kuch Ankahee Si	Sachin Deshmukh	
2024	Ghum Hai Kisikey Pyaar Meiin	Sachin Deshmukh	
2024	Dil Ko Tumse Pyaar Hua	Sachin Deshmukh	
2024	Yeh Teej Badi Hai Mast Mast	Sachin Deshmukh	
2024	Hathi Ghoda Paalki Birthday Kanhaiya Laal Ki	Sachin Deshmukh	
2025	Advocate Anjali Awasthi	Sachin Deshmukh	
2025	Jaadu Teri Nazar – Daayan Ka Mausam	Sachin Deshmukh	
2026	Shehzaadi... Hai Tu Dil Ki	Sachin Deshmukh	
2026	Mr. and Mrs. Parshuram	Sachin Deshmukh	
2026	Jhanak	Sachin Deshmukh	
2026	Sairaab	Sachin Deshmukh	
2026	Oh Humnava Tum Dena Saath Mera	Sachin Deshmukh	

=== Music videos ===
Year	Title	Singer	Ref.
2020	Yaad Baarish Mein	Sonal Pradhan	

== Accolades ==
Year	Award	Category	Work	Result	Ref.
2022	Indian Television Academy Awards	Best Actor – Popular	Pandya Store	Nominated	
2022	Indian Television Academy Awards	Popular Actor – Drama	Pandya Store	Nominated	
2023	Indian Telly Awards	Best Actor in a lead role	Pandya Store	Nominated	
2023	Indian Telly Awards	Best Onscreen Couple (with Alice Kaushik)	Pandya Store	Nominated	
2023	Indian Telly Awards	Fan Favourite Actor	Pandya Store	Nominated	
2024	Indian Television Academy Awards	Best Actor – Drama	Udne Ki Aasha	Nominated	
2025	Pinkvilla Screen and Style Icons Awards	Best Actor TV – Male	Udne Ki Aasha	Won	
2025	Indian Telly Awards	Best Actor in a Lead Role	Udne Ki Aasha	Won	
2025	Indian Telly Awards	Best Onscreen Couple (with Neha Harsora)	Udne Ki Aasha	Won	
2025	Indian Telly Awards	Fan Favorite Jodi (with Neha Harsora)	Udne Ki Aasha	Nominated	
2025	Indian Telly Awards	Fan Favourite Star - Star Plus	Udne Ki Aasha	Nominated	

== See also ==
- List of Indian television actors
