= Manish Goplani =

Indian television actor

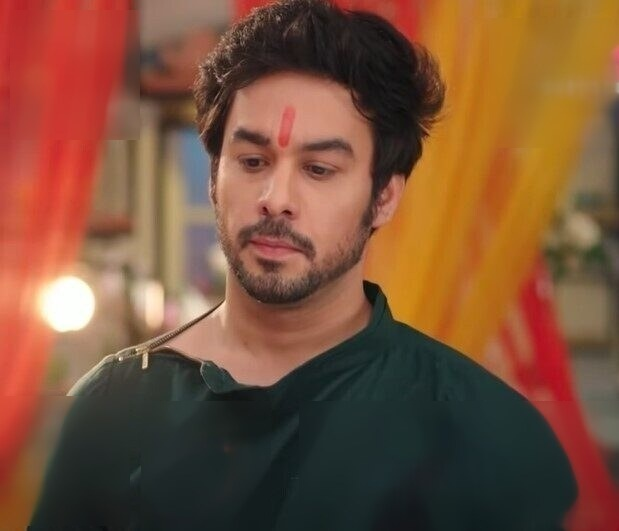
- Born: 19 November 1992 (age 33); Jaipur, Rajasthan, India
- Occupations: Actor, Model
- Years active: 2014–present
- Known for: Thapki Pyaar Ki

Manish Goplani is an Indian actor. He is known for his portrayal of Bihaan Pandey in Thapki Pyaar Ki.

== Career ==
Goplani started off by playing Rajbeer in the Zee Marudhara series Chorre Tera Gaon Bada Pyaara. His breakthrough came when his portrayal of Bihaan Pandey and Aryan Khanna from 2015 to 2017 in Colors TV's Thapki Pyaar Ki, his second consecutive show with Singh, gave him a household name.

In 2016, he played a cameo role in Yeh Vaada Raha on Zee TV. From 2017 to 2018, Goplani acted as Bhim Singh Bhullar in Detective Didi opposite Sonia Balani. He then appeared in the comedy sitcom Belan Wali Bahu as Lallan.

In 2019, he portrayed Ghoonghru/Kshitij Agarwal/Krish Asthana in Zee TV's Aap Ke Aa Jane Se. From 2019 to 2020 Goplani played Dr. Saahas Banerjee in Bepanah Pyaar opposite Ishita Dutta. From 2023 to 2024, he is portraying Rohan Thakur in Shemaroo Umang's Ummeed Ki Roshni Shravani. Since June 2024, he enter the Colors TV's Suhaagan as Shlok Pandey.

== Filmography ==
=== Television ===
Year	Title	Role	Notes
2014–2015	Chorre Tera Gaon Bada Pyaara	Rajveer	
2015–2017	Thapki Pyar Ki	Bihaan Pandey	
2017	Thapki Pyar Ki	Aryan Khanna	
2017	The Man From Bekasi	Karan	
2017–2018	Detective Didi	Bhim Singh Bhullar	
2018	Belan Wali Bahu	Lallan	
2018	Laal Ishq	Mayank	
2019	Aap Ke Aa Jane Se	Ghoonghru/Krish Asthana/Kshitij Agarwal	
2019–2020	Bepannah Pyaar	Dr. Saahas Banerjee	
2023–2024	Shravani	Rohan Sharma	
2024	Suhaagan	Shlok Pandey	

==== Special appearances ====
Year	Title	Role
2016	Yeh Vaada Raha	Chetan
2016	Ishq Ka Rang Safed	Bihaan Pandey
2018	Kumkum Bhagya	Himself

=== Films ===
Year	Title	Role	Notes
2024	Tipppsy		
2024	Zorawar Di Jacqueline		
2024	Forbidden Love		

=== Web series ===
Year	Title	Role	Notes
2018	Lala Ishq	Mayank	
2020	Manohar Kahaniyan	Shankar	
2021	Jurm Aur Jaazbaat	Alok Verma	1 episode
2022	Exit	Pintu Pandey	
2022	Tera Challava	Armaan	1 episode
