= Ek Deewane Ki Deewaniyat =

2025 Indian film by Milap Zaveri

- Theatrical release poster
- Directed by: Milap Zaveri
- Written by: Milap Zaveri; Mushtaq Shiekh
- Produced by: Anshul Rajendra Garg; Dinesh Jain
- Starring: Harshvardhan Rane; Sonam Bajwa
- Cinematography: Nigam Bomzan
- Edited by: Maahir Zaveri
- Music by: Score: John Stewart Eduri; Songs: Kaushik–Guddu; Kunaal Vermaa; Rajat Nagpal; Annkur R Pathakk; Rahul Mishra; Lijo George – DJ Chetas
- Production company: Desi Movies Factory
- Distributed by: Avanika Films
- Release date: 21 October 2025
- Running time: 141 minutes
- Country: India
- Language: Hindi
- Budget: ₹25 crore
- Box office: est. ₹112.03 crore

Ek Deewane Ki Deewaniyat (transl. The obsession of a crazy lover) is a 2025 Indian Hindi-language romantic drama film directed by Milap Zaveri and written by Zaveri and Mushtaq Shiekh. Produced under the banner Desi Movies Factory, the film stars Harshvardhan Rane and Sonam Bajwa in the lead roles.

The film was theatrically released on 21 October 2025, coinciding with Diwali. It received generally negative reviews from critics but was a major commercial success, grossing ₹112 crore worldwide and emerged as the 12th highest-grossing Hindi film of 2025.

== Plot ==
Vikramaditya Bhonsle is a young, powerful politician being groomed by his ambitious father, Ganpatrao Bhonsle, to become the next Chief Minister. His mother died during his childbirth, and his father had blamed him for her death since his childhood. This blame instilled in him a warped sense of entitlement and a belief that he must take whatever he wants by force. Vikramaditya lives a life of luxury and political influence, but beneath his polished exterior lies deep emotional instability because of this childhood trauma. He maintains animosity against his business rival Radheja and political rival Govind Gokhale.

His world changes when he sees Bollywood superstar Adaa Randhawa and falls in love at first sight. He becomes immediately obsessed with the idea of marrying her, envisioning an entire future together despite having no real connection with her. Adaa, however, is a strong, independent woman with a modern mindset who feels no romantic interest in him. She agrees to befriend him, but when Vikramaditya proposes during their trip to military barracks, she understands his true intentions and openly rejects him.

Unable to handle the word "no," he begins using his political power to manipulate and pressurize her. He threatens her career, sabotages her film projects, and sends goons to create disturbances in her life. In one instance, he orchestrates a controversy around one of her films, halting its screening by claiming it hurts religious sentiments. Despite his increasingly threatening behavior, he is also shown in a sympathetic light—he financially helps a young street vendor so the boy can attend school, and he comes to the aid of Adaa's father when his name is dragged into an examination paper leak scam.

Adaa's family doesn't support the relationship but grows helpless against Vikramaditya's power. Adaa repeatedly sets boundaries and pushes back against his advances, even begging for mercy, but Vikramaditya only grows more relentless. The tension escalates when he begins threatening her family and livelihood, making her life a living nightmare. At an armed forces event, his delusional nature becomes fully apparent as he openly discusses wedding plans with her despite her clear disgust. The turning point arrives when Adaa, driven to desperation by his unrelenting harassment and finding no help from a police force that works for Vikramaditya, gatecrashes one of his political rallies dressed in red and makes a shocking public announcement on live television: she will spend a night with any man who kills Vikramaditya before Dussehra. This act of defiance, which she frames as aurat ki sanak—a woman's madness—is her attempt to weaponize the very masculinity he has been subjecting her to, turning his obsessive pursuit back on him by putting a bounty on his head. Vikramaditya is devastated by her announcement, but Adaa explains that she needn't spend a night with a stranger for the person who murders Vikramaditya Bhonsle will be killed too.

His heartbreak manifests not in retreat but in further self-destructive behaviour. In a twisted attempt to prove his love and send a message to the world, he orchestrates an attempt on his own life on Gandhi Jayanti, hiring someone to shoot him so he can demonstrate that anyone who tries to kill him will face imprisonment. He survives the shooting, and during his recovery, Adaa confronts him with cold fury, lecturing him about his impending death and flinging photographs of him burning in an empty funeral pyre to show how much she welcomes the prospect of his demise.

Vikramaditya organized the marriage of a hundred couples, leaving one room for himself and Adaa. Adaa rejects him openly yet again. He then accompanies Adaa to a temple, where she had gone to wish for his death. He is attacked but survives with the help of Sawant, his right-hand man. He expresses his deepest desire of marrying Adaa to the deity, and Adaa in contrast prays for his demise.

Govind Gokhale and Radheja visits Adaa, offering to eliminate Vikramaditya in return of her support for their party. Adaa declines, openly saying that she wouldn't even share her hatred for Vikramaditya with anyone. When Vikramaditya learns about this, he threatens Radheja and Gokhale against such an act in future.

Vikramaditya is attacked again during a play both he and Adaa were watching, but survives yet again. On the other hand, Ganpatrao's goons abduct Adaa in her way home from the play, and Ganpatrao offers her to Vikramaditya for a night on the condition that he would never talk about Adaa again. Vikramaditya, however, rescues Adaa, explains the circumstances and drops her home without even touching her, proving his true love for her.

The next day, upon observing Vikramaditya's plight, Sawant, reveals a crucial truth: Ganpatrao had brainwashed Vikramaditya into believing he was responsible for his mother's death, when in fact this was a lie designed to control him. Learning this, Vikramaditya experiences a brief moment of clarity. He apologizes to Adaa, telling her that her choice is what matters most, and expresses his wish to marry her—not as a demand, but as a request.

Ganpatrao, seeing his son's weakness, orders Sawant to kill Adaa. In the climactic confrontation on Dussehra, a festival where both Vikramaditya and Adaa were present, a hidden Sawant aims his gun at Adaa, but Vikramaditya throws himself in front of her, taking the bullet meant for her to his heart. As he lies dying, he begs for Adaa's forgiveness. In that final moment, she forgives him and finally feels the weight of his love, but it is too late. He dies in her arms, and she places the engagement ring he had been holding onto her finger—a gesture that suggests a belated acceptance of his devotion, even as it negates her earlier defiance and independence. The film ends on this tragic note, with Vikramaditya's obsession consuming him completely and Adaa left to process the complicated aftermath of a man who loved her to the point of self-destruction.

== Cast ==
- Harshvardhan Rane as Vikramaditya Bhonsle
  - Abeer Jain as young Vikram
- Sonam Bajwa as Adaa Randhawa
- Shaad Randhawa as Sawant
- Sachin Khedekar as Ganpatrao Bhonsle, Vikram's father
- Ananth Narayan Mahadevan as Adaa's father
- Rajesh Khera as Raheja
- Shailesh Korde as Gokhale
- Sakshi Sharma as Adaa's mother
- Sarah Killedar as Adaa's sister

== Production ==
The film was officially announced on 14 February 2025 under the working title Deewaniyat. In May 2025, the title was renamed to Ek Deewane Ki Deewaniyat.

== Marketing ==
The film's first look was unveiled on 27 May 2025. The film's official teaser was released on 22 August 2025.

== Release ==
Ek Deewane Ki Deewaniyat was initially scheduled for release on 2 October 2025. However, the film was later postponed and was released theatrically on 21 October 2025, coinciding with Diwali.

== Soundtrack ==
Ek Deewane Ki Deewaniyat

Soundtrack album by Kaushik–Guddu, Kunaal Vermaa, Annkur R Pathakk, Rajat Nagpal, Rahul Mishra and Lijo George – DJ Chetas
- Released: 21 October 2025
- Genre: Feature film soundtrack
- Length: 41:07
- Language: Hindi
- Label: Play DMF

The music of the film is composed by Kaushik–Guddu, Kunaal Vermaa, Annkur R Pathakk, Rajat Nagpal, Rahul Mishra and Lijo George – DJ Chetas with lyrics written by Kunaal Vermaa, Sameer Anjaan, Siddhant Kaushal, Sachin Urmtosh and Prince Dubey.

The song "Dil Dil Dil" is a remake of the song of "Koi Jaye To Le Aaye" from the 1996 film Ghatak: Lethal sung by Alka Yagnik, Shankar Mahadevan composed by Anu Malik and written by Rahat Indori.

Track listing
No.	Title	Lyrics	Music	Singer(s)	Length
1.	"Deewaniyat"	Kunaal Vermaa	Kaushik–Guddu	Vishal Mishra	4:17
2.	"Mera Hua"	Sachin Urmtosh	Annkur R Pathakk	Annkur R Pathakk	3:43
3.	"Bol Kaffara Kya Hoga"	Sameer Anjaan	Lijo George – DJ Chetas	Neha Kakkar, Farhan Sabri	3:27
4.	"Mera Hua" (Arijit Singh)	Sachin Urmtosh	Annkur R Pathakk	Arijit Singh	3:56
5.	"Dil Dil Dil"	Siddhant Kaushal	Rajat Nagpal	Sunidhi Chauhan, Divya Kumar	3:36
6.	"Hum Bas Tere Hain"	Prince Dubey	Rahul Mishra	B Praak	4:28
7.	"Khoobsurat"	Kunaal Vermaa	Kunaal Vermaa	Jubin Nautiyal	4:17
8.	"Dil Mere Naam"	Prince Dubey	Rahul Mishra	Sonu Nigam	3:29
9.	"Mera Hua" (Female)	Sachin Urmtosh	Annkur R Pathakk	Shreya Ghoshal	3:30
10.	"Deewaniyat" (Unplugged)	Kunaal Vermaa	Kaushik–Guddu	Vishal Mishra	1:55
11.	"Hum Bas Tere Hain" (Reprise)	Prince Dubey	Rahul Mishra	Rahul Mishra	4:29
Total length:					41:07

=== Background Score ===
Ek Deewane Ki Deewaniyat

Film score by John Stewart Eduri
- Released: 24 December 2025
- Recorded: 2025
- Genre: Film score
- Label: Play DMF
- Producer: John Stewart Eduri

Ek Deewane Ki Deewaniyat Theme
No.	Title	Length
1.	"All Bow To The King"	1:13
2.	"Raavan In Love"	2:47
3.	"Dance of Flames"	1:40
4.	"Star Crossed Lovers"	1:05
5.	"Love Hatred and Heartbreak"	1:16
6.	"Adaa's Challenge"	2:20
Total length:		10:21

== Reception ==
Ek Deewane Ki Deewaniyat received generally negative reviews from critics.

Bollywood Hungama rated it 3.5/5 stars and said that "On the whole, EK DEEWANE KI DEEWANIYAT is unapologetically massy and fiercely passionate, backed by solid performances and thumping music." Archika Khurana of The Times of India gave 2.5 stars out of 5 and said that "A visually pleasing but formulaic romantic drama lifted by Harshvardhan Rane and Sonam Bajwa’s performances and a soulful soundtrack. Watch it for the emotions, not for novelty." Rishabh Suri of Hindustan Times rated it 1.5/5 stars and wrote "The whole point of the film is to end up as an Instagram reel for jilted lovers to clip and plaster across their feeds."

Rachit Gupta of Filmfare rated it 2.5/5 stars and said that "Harshvardhan Rane leads from the front in Ek Deewane Ki Deewaniyat, which starts off interestingly, but eventually fizzles out in massy masala movie territory." Vinamra Mathur of Firstpost rated the film 2 stars out of 5 and wrote "The most lenient thing that can be said about this romantic saga is that it gives Rane a platform he always yearned for. But the film that he has chosen or that chose him feels 30 years too late despite the success of obsessive (read obnoxious) lovers like Kabir Singh and Kundan."

Nishad Thaivalappil of News 18 gave 1.5 stars out of 5 and said that "Through the whole film, you only feel bad for three people — Anant Mahadevan, Sachin Khedekar and YOURSELF! Why have they done the film and why are you doing this to yourself! To sum it up, the film is the only thing you need to burst out of the big screen this Diwali". Sana Farzeen of India Today rated the film 1.5 stars out of 5 and wrote "The only reason the film is bearable is because of how sincere both actors are in their performances. Harshvardhan Rane seems to have read the memo well; he has found his niche with these brooding lover characters. Sonam Bajwa, on the other hand, looks stunning and pulls off the part strong-part vulnerable woman quite well."

Shubhra Gupta of The Indian Express gave 1 stars out of 5 and said that "Bollywood refuses to deep-six the deeply regressive misogynistic toxicity, cementing the dangerous idea that one-sided obsession is a perfectly legitimate emotion. Whatever happened to No means No?" Rahul Desai of The Hollywood Reporter India observed that "Harshvardhan Rane and Sonam Bajwa star in the most casually offensive Hindi film of the year."

Nandini Ramnath of Scroll.in writes in his review that "The 140-minute film, written by Zaveri and Mushtaq Shiekh, has scenes in excruciating slow motion and songs with the usual doom-and-gloom lyrics. The general feeling is of being trapped in a small elevator during a lengthy power cut."
