= Aaj Ki Housewife Hai... Sab Jaanti Hai =

2012 Indian TV series

- Genre: Drama
- Screenplay by: Yogesh Vikrant; Gitangshu Dey
- Story by: brijmohanvinta nandaSonali Jaffar; Sudhir Kumar
- Directed by: Saabir Mustafa
- Starring: Anirudh Dave; Suhasi Goradia Dhami; Himani Shivpuri; Monica Khanna; Vijayendra Kumeria; Preeti Puri; Pooja Singh; Sanjeev Singh Rathore
- Country of origin: India
- Original language: Hindi
- No. of seasons: 1
- No. of episodes: 170

Production
- Producer: Gulshan Sachdeva
- Production location: Allahabad
- Camera setup: Multi-camera
- Running time: approx. 20 minutes
- Production company: Film & Shots

Original release
- Network: Zee TV
- Release: 31 December 2012 – 23 August 2013

Aaj Ki Housewife Hai... Sab Jaanti Hai (International Title: Modern Homemaker) is an Indian television drama broadcast on Zee TV. Suhasi Goradia Dhami and Anirudh Dave are the lead actors of the series. Having already been broadcast on Zee TV, the show is set to air on English-Dubbed channel Zee World in Africa.

== Story ==
The story revolves around Kanhaiyya Chaturvedi, a dabang policeman, and a journalist Sona and how the two get married. Sona quits her job to show how important a housewife is. Sona then becomes an ideal housewife for her family. The show is set against the backdrop of Uttar Pradesh.

== Cast ==
- Anirudh Dave - Kanhaiyya Chaturvedi
- Suhasi Goradia Dhami - Sona Kanhaiyya Chaturvedi
- Himani Shivpuri - Sunaina Chaturvedi
- Monica Khanna - Neelam Uddham Chaturvedi
- Vijayendra Kumeria - Uddham Chaturvedi
- Vandana Singh (actress) - Chitraasi Kanhaiyya Chaturvedi
- Parikshit Sahni - Gyaneshwar Chaturvedi
- Rita Bhaduri - Girija Devi
- Rajesh Jais - Govardhan Chaturvedi
- Aanchal Dwiwedi - Bindiya Govardhan Chaturvedi
- Prashant Chawla - Manohar Chaturvedi
- Preeti Puri - Renu Manohar Chaturvedi
- Garima Jain - Julie Chaturvedi
- Shyam Masalkar - Durgesh
- Shivangi Sharma - Darshana
- Rahul Pendkalkar - Chikku Manohar Chaturvedi
- Pooja Singh - Julie Govardhan Chaturvedi
- Ketki Dave - Sarla
- Sushmita Mukherjee - Indrani Devi
- Suchita Trivedi - Maya
- Sanjeev Singh Rathore - Laddu Lal Saxena
- Avdhesh Kushwaha - Bajrangi

== Casting ==
Ragini Khanna was initially cast as the lead of the show. Date problems resulted in Khanna being replaced by Suhasi Goradia Dhami.
