= Bade Bhaiyya Ki Dulhania =

Television series

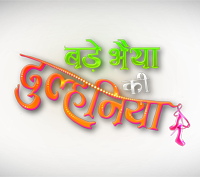
- Genre: Comedy; Drama
- Written by: Srinita Bhoumick; Malavika Asthana; Nikhil Vaddiboina
- Directed by: Pushkar Mahabal
- Starring: Priyansh Jora; Namita Dubey
- Composers: Tanishk Bagchi; Jasleen Kaur Royal; Udbhav & Dony; Gajendra Verma
- Country of origin: India
- Original language: Hindi
- No. of seasons: 1
- No. of episodes: 57

Production
- Producers: Sukesh Motwani; Mautik Tolia
- Production locations: Mumbai, India
- Cinematography: Akash Agrawal
- Editor: Praveen Kathikuloth
- Camera setup: Multi-camera
- Running time: 22 minutes approx.
- Production company: Bodhi Tree Multimedia Pvt Ltd

Original release
- Network: Sony TV
- Release: 18 July – 7 October 2016

Bade Bhaiyya Ki Dulhania (transl. The elder brother's Bride) is an Indian Hindi comedy-drama television series, which aired on Sony TV and Sony TV Asia from 18 July 2016 to 7 October 2016.

Priyansh Jora and Namita Dubey were the lead actors in the show.

== Cast ==
=== Main ===
- Priyansh Jora as Abhishek Pant
- Namita Dubey as Meera Raizada

=== Recurring ===
- Ushma Rathod as Babli Pant, Abhishek's mother
- Veena Mehta as Amma/Dadi, Abhishek's grandmother
- Urfi Javed as Avni Pant, Abhishek's sister
- Himanshu Dubgotra as Randheer
- Yash Acharya as Rohan Pant, Abhishek's brother
- Ritu Chaudhary as Madhu Pant: Abhishek's aunt; Kapil and Anita's mother
- Rishidev Sharma as Kapil Pant: Madhu's son
- Charvi Saraf as Anita Pant, Madhu's daughter
- Soniya Kaur as Rekha Pant, Abhishek's aunt
- Arjun Manhas as Bhimraj a.k.a. Sona Pant, Rekha's son
- Saloni Daini as Mona Pant, Rekha's daughter
- Inderjeet Sagoo as Aman Singh, Meera's fiancé
- Indraneel Bhattacharya as Prahlad Raizada: Meera and Riya's father
- Palak Purswani as Riya Raizada: Prahlad's daughter; Meera's sister
- Naveen Pandita as Sanjay Thakral: Rita's fiancé
