= Awesome Mausam =

- Theatrical Release Poster
- Directed by: Yogesh Bhardwaj
- Written by: Adesh k Arjun
- Screenplay by: Yogesh Bhardwaj
- Story by: Yogesh Bhardwaj
- Produced by: Mukesh Choudhary
- Starring: Naina Ganguly(Ambalika Sarkar); Rahul Romy Sharma
- Cinematography: Pratap S Choudhary
- Edited by: Govind Dubey
- Music by: Mani Shankar; Ishan Ghosh; Komal Aran Atariya; Yogesh Bhardwaj (lyrics)
- Production company: Triveni Movies International
- Distributed by: VIP (Vinay Choksy)
- Release date: 18 March 2016
- Running time: 131 Minutes
- Country: India
- Language: Hindi

Awesome Mausam is a 2016 Bollywood movie is directed by Yogesh Bhardwaj and Produced by Mukesh Choudhary. The film features Rahul Romy Sharma, Naina Ganguly(Ambalika Sarkar), Mukesh Tiwari, Suunil R Kumar, Raja Mishra and Suhasini Mulay.

== Plot ==
This love story between a Hindu boy, Rahul Sharma (Rahul Romy Sharma) and Muslim girl, Ghazal Siddiqui (Ambalika Sarkar) invokes the ‘Laila-Majnu’ track to drive home its legendary leanings. Unfortunately there's really nothing much to recommend here save for a few lines of stinging thought-provoking dialogue.

Rahul and Ghazal perform the Laila-Majnu play in their college and eventually fall in love. But the girl's uneducated, successful land shark, father, Siddiqui (Mukesh Tiwari) is livid about the pairing and puts up hurdles in their way. An NGO, basically a website titled 'Love Guard', started by Arjun (Manmohan tiwari) – a love-loss survivor, hopes to help and protect such couples achieve happily ever after. Suunil R Kumar played and important role as a friend of Rahul in the college premises till tragedy happens with him. A comedy scene has been performed by "Raja Mishra" with the catch phrase "got it" to lighten the mood of the audience. Rahul and Ghazal seek out his help but will that be enough to withstand the entire onslaught that Siddiqui has in store for them?

This film delivers its plea for Hindu-Muslim amity without much finesse or interest, it has all been done before and love stories of this nature and bent have become stale and passé. The lead performers are also not significantly worthy.

== Cast ==
- Rahul Sharma
- Naina Ganguly
- Mukesh Tiwari
- Manmohan Tiwari
- Suhasini Mulay
- Vaarssh Bhatnagar
- Lalitesh Jha
- Prince Sondhi
- Manmohan Tiwari
- Shikha Itkan
- Suunil R Kumar
- Raja Mishra

== Soundtrack ==
Awesome Mausam

Soundtrack album by Sonu Nigam, Shaan, Palak Muchhal, KK, Javed Ali, Monali Thakur, Neha Bhasin, Priya Bhattacharya, Ishan Ghosh
- Released: 24 February 2016
- Genre: Feature film soundtrack
- Length: 131 Minutes
- Language: Hindi
- Label: T-Series

The music for Awesome Mausam has been composed by Javed Ali, Ishan Ghosh, Komal Aran Atariya The music rights have been acquired by T-Series. The album contains total 6 tracks.

| No. | Title | Music | Singer(s) | Length |
|---|---|---|---|---|
| 1. | "Sathiyaan" | Komal Aran Atariya | Sonu Nigam | 5:49 |
| 2. | "Tere Naina Mere Naino Se" | Komal Aran Atariya | Shaan, Palak Muchhal | 4:55 |
| 3. | "Kaisi Yeh Pyaas Hai" | | KK, Priya Bhattacharya | 5:06 |
| 4. | "Laila Majnu" | Javed Ali | Javed Ali, Monali Thakur | 4:59 |
| 5. | "Talli Dol" | Ishan Ghosh | Benny Dayal, Priya Bhattacharya, Ishan Ghosh | 4:13 |
| 6. | "Wanna Wanna Fun" | | Neha Bhasin | 4:15 |
| Total length: | | | | 32:46 |
