= Hum Hain Na =

Indian television series

- Genre: Drama; Romance
- Created by: DJ's a Creative Unit
- Story by: Saba Mumtaz
- Starring: Kanwar Dhillon; Pratyusha Banerjee; Shubhangi Gokhale
- Country of origin: India
- Original language: Hindi
- No. of seasons: 01
- No. of episodes: 127

Production
- Producers: Tony Singh; Deeya Singh
- Production locations: Varanasi; Mumbai
- Running time: 20 minutes
- Production company: DJ's a Creative Unit

Original release
- Network: Sony TV
- Release: 1 September 2014 – 19 March 2015

Hum Hain Na is an Indian television drama show which premiered on 1 September 2014. It was replaced by Dil Ki Baatein Dil Hi Jaane from 23 March 2015.

Hum Hain Na is set in Varanasi and portrays the relationship of main character Shivprasad Mishra, nicknamed "Bunty", with his relatives. Sony Entertainment Television marketed Hum Hain Na as a "man-centric" show. Lead actor Kanwar Dhillon stated that the show was intended to be different from other television dramas which tended to focus on the relationship between mothers-in-law and daughters-in-law. The hundredth episode of the show was broadcast on 2 February 2015.

== Cast ==
- Kanwar Dhillon as Shivprasad "Bunty" Mishra
- Pratyusha Banerjee as Sagarika Chattopadhyay
- Shubhangi Gokhale as Laxmi Mishra / Ammaji
- Rajendra Chawla as Bhola Shankar Mishra / Babuji
- Ketaki Kadam / Vinny Arora as Satya
- Manmohan Tiwari as Rameshwar Mishra
- Ashiesh Roy as Mr. Chattopadhyay
- Sharhaan Singh as Resham Singh
