= Thief of Baghdad (TV series) =

- Genre: Fantasy
- Written by: Shafique Ansari
- Screenplay by: Ram Govind
- Story by: Ram Govind
- Directed by: Vijay Pandey
- Theme music composer: Raju Singh
- Composers: Bittu Merchant; Raju Singh
- Country of origin: India
- Original language: Hindi
- No. of seasons: 1
- No. of episodes: 48

Production
- Executive producer: Sanjay Wadhwa Purnendu M. Shekhar Rajeev Sharma Sangeeta Bajpai Deepak Chabria
- Producer: Reena Wadhwa
- Editors: Mahesh M. Mistry; Sanjay Chowdhury
- Running time: 40 minutes
- Production company: R.W. Media

Original release
- Network: Zee TV
- Release: 25 October 2000 – 2001

Thief of Baghdad is an Indian fantasy adventure TV series that first originally aired on Zee TV between 2000–2001. The show was loosely based on the Arabian Nights story. It was originally intended to run for 48 episodes but it went off-air in June 2001 abruptly due to a conflict between the production house and Zee TV. It was directed by Vijay Pandey, who has earlier directed shows like Sword of Tipu Sultan, Great Maratha, Arth, Des Mein Nikla Hoga Chand and Saat Phere. It was also syndicated on sister channels Zee Next and Zee Smile and Zee Anmol.

== Synopsis ==
Set in the Middle East during an era of marvellous adventures and magical folk tales as narrated in the Arabian Nights, 'Thief of Baghdad' tells the story of Jafar, a ruthless warlord serving under the command of the evil genie 'Shah Jinn' and his obsession with conquering the entire world to become its undisputed king.

Shortly after invading the city of Baghdad with his army and brutally vanquishing a secret rebellion led by Mukhtar, a spiritual leader and revolutionary, Jafar is informed by Shah Jinn and his sorceress aide Badi about a prospect which can greatly assist him in achieving his seemingly overwhelming objective. Jafar must convince a princess belonging to a peaceful kingdom of fairies to marry him of her own volition in order to gain complete authority and control over the inhabitants of both realms. Immediately, he decides to interrupt the birthday celebration of the beautiful princess Yasmeen and take her away from her kingdom to imprison her in his palace full of grim spells preventing her from escaping back to her home. As the princess begins to develop feelings of despair and anguish, hope appears in the form of a notorious thief known only throughout the city as the 'Thief of Baghdad', a sly and artful hero who steals from the rich to help the poor and oppressed.

One night during an intrusion into Jafar's palace to retrieve a collection of magical items stolen from three visiting merchants, the Thief coincidentally encounters the captive princess and they both recall their romance with each other prior to the events which unfolded with the appearance of Jafar. Realising the severity of the situation and its impact on every inhabitant in both realms, the Thief decides to do whatever he can to stop the tyranny of Jafar and rescue the Princess from his vile grasp.

As the series progresses the Thief and several allies he forms relationships with all have to endure and overcome the dangerous obstacles and ghastly traps Jafar has set to secure his position as the ultimate king of kings.

== Cast ==
- Ahmed a.k.a. Thief Of Baghdad – Narendra Jha
- Yasmeen – Kim Lasrado
- Jafar – Vikrant Chaturvedi
- Tugral - Shiva
- Abbas - Javed Khan
- Masood - Surinder Pal
- Qasim - Browney Prasher
- Jamal Zardari - Puneetchandra Sharrma
- Faridgul - Shailendra Shrivastav
- Zareen – Pallavi Solanki
- Badi - Zahida Parveen
- Neki - Jaya Mathur
- Khanam - Asha Bachani
- Yusuf Sani - Sunil Nagar
- Malika Nasreen - Seema Pandey
- Firoz Bakht – Sumit Pathak
- Alim Haqqani - Prithvi Zutshi
- Azra – Shashi Sharma
- Kulsum - Prerna Agarwal
- Chitrasen - Radha Kishan
- Zahoor Malkooti - Sanjay Batra
- Usman - Mukesh Ahuja
- Rustam - Master Mohit Makkad
- Hakimbaba - Shahnawaz
- Raziya - Rajshree
