= Resha Konkar =

Indian television actress

- Born: 30 November 1989 (age 36); Mumbai, Maharashtra, India
- Education: Patkar-Varde College
- Occupation: Actress
- Years active: 2010; 2012–2020
- Height: 1.63 m (5 ft 4 in)

Resha Konkar is an Indian television actress. She is known for portraying the role of Rinki Bhalla on Yeh Hai Mohabbatein and Gauri Agarwal on Aap Ke Aa Jane Se that airs on Zee TV.

== Career ==
Konkar rose to fame in 2010, when she appeared as herself in the third episode of Season 1 in the reality show Emotional Atyachar. In 2012, she started her acting career when she starred in the series Junoon – Aisi Nafrat Toh Kaisa Ishq as Sunheri Ramdhari Singh. In the same year, she joined Bade Achhe Lagte Hain as Saumya. In 2013, she was cast in the series Yeh Hai Mohabbatein as Rinki Bhalla. In 2016, she was cast in the episodic roles in the horror serial Darr Sabko Lagta Hai, and a crime show Savdhaan India. In late 2017, she bagged the recurring role of Gauri Agarwal on Zee TV's Aap Ke Aa Jane Se.

== Filmography ==
Television
Year	Title	Role	Notes
2010	Emotional Atyachar	Herself	1 episode
2012	Savdhaan India	Alka (Episode 191) / Ratna (Episode 972)/ Santosh/ Heena/ Mamta	Episodic roles
2012	Junoon – Aisi Nafrat Toh Kaisa Ishq	Sunheri Ramdhari Singh	Recurring role
2012	Bade Achhe Lagte Hain	Saumya	Recurring role
2013	Pavitra Bandhan	Shibani	antagonist
2013–2015	Yeh Hai Mohabbatein	Rinki Bhalla / Rinki Mihir Arora	Recurring role
2016	Darr Sabko Lagta Hai		Episodic role
2016	Adaalat		Episodic role
2016	Kavach... Kaali Shaktiyon Se	Natasha Bundela	supporting role
2016	Yeh Kahan Aa Gaye Hum	Protima	Extended Cameo
2016	Agent Raghav – Crime Branch	Mona	Episodic role
2017-2022	Crime Patrol	Maya/Fatima/Sandhya/Rafat/Rubina/Megha/Farzana/Rekha/Nidhi	Episodic roles
2018–2019	Aap Ke Aa Jane Se	Gauri Agarwal	Recurring role
2020	RadhaKrishn	Kunti	
