= Tu Mera Hero =

Indian television series

- Created by: Sumeet Hukamchand Mittal; Shashi Mittal
- Directed by: Vikram Ghai
- Starring: Priyansh Jora; Sonia Balani
- Theme music composer: Dony Hazarika
- Composer: Aasish Rego
- Country of origin: India
- Original language: Hindi
- No. of episodes: 281

Production
- Producers: Shashi Mittal; Sumeet Hukamchand Mittal
- Production locations: Mathura; Mumbai
- Running time: 24 minutes
- Production company: Shashi Sumeet Productions

Original release
- Network: StarPlus
- Release: 22 December 2014 – 14 November 2015

Tu Mera Hero (transl. You are my hero) is a 2014 comedy-drama soap opera which premiered on 22 December 2014 on StarPlus. The show starred Priyansh Jora and Sonia Balani.

== Plot ==
The story is about a person named Titu, who attracts a girl called Panchi. The story starts when Panchi introduces herself to Titu. Later, Panchi attends a magic show arranged by Titu. The magician and the audience are frightened when a bull comes charging towards Titu. Titu informs his mother Surekha about the mishap at the magic show. Titu's father confronts him about the money he lost at the magic show and threatens to take his bike away if he fails in his exams. Titu is baffled by his exam result. Kamlesh is infuriated and gets angry at a postman for delivering the wrong result to their house. Later, Kamlesh informs Titu's father about Titu's result being exchanged with Panchi's and Titu's father apologises to Kamlesh. Rachna's would-be husband congratulates Panchi on her success. Meanwhile, Titu's father, Govindnarayan reprimands Titu for neglecting his academics. Later, Panchi expresses her feelings for Titu to Rachna. Panchi is heartbroken, seeing Titu flirting with Ruhi. Later, Panchi unwillingly gives Titu's phone number to Ruhi. Titu is heartbroken upon learning that Ruhi loves someone else. He refuses to believe Panchi but Ruhi turns up with her boyfriend. Govindnarayan asks Titu to leave Mathura when he goes home alone. Panchi decides to help Titu. Titu arranges a special treat for Panchi as a token of gratitude for her help. Meanwhile, Surekha tries to convince Govindnarayan to reconsider his decision regarding Titu and Panchi's marriage. Meanwhile, on marriage day Manorama learns about Titu's disappearance. Panchi tries to speak to Surekha but she avoids her. Kamlesh asks Titu to keep Panchi happy. Panchi thanks God for granting her biggest wish. Surekha feels troubled with the proceedings. Titu comforts a despondent Panchi. Golu reminds Surekha of a few incidents when Panchi had helped Titu. Surekha changes her mind and agrees to accept Panchi as her daughter-in-law. She gives ancestral jewellery to Panchi as a token of acceptance from her side. After that Titu and Panchi go to Sivgarh with their families. A dejected Panchi confronts Govindnarayan for concealing Titu's laziness and shares her miseries with him. Govindnarayan tries to prove Titu's innocence to Panchi. Panchi goes back to approving of Titu and Govindnarayan promises Panchi that he will help her in making Titu a working man. Keshav asks Bhagwati to hide the truth of Mukund's marriage to Govindnarayan. At home Govindnarayan learns about Mukund's marriage and also discovers that Mukund's father-in-law has been jailed. He allows Mukund's bride, Vaishali to live in Govindnarayan's house. After many attempts by Govind and Panchi and tries to stop them by Surekha, Vaishali, Rekha and Mukund and Titu himself, lazy Titu realises that he loves Panchi and he has wasted his days, he decides to work. On the other hand, Rekha's elder son Keshav is longing for his own child while his wife Bhagwati wants him to accept Sundar first. Due to some misunderstandings, Keshav believes that he is going to become a father, and later on realises the truth that Bhagwati is not pregnant and has been eating contraceptives, gets heartbroken. Real motives of Vaishali, Mukund and Rekha are also revealed, they think that Rekha's sons are being differentiated from Titu, Titu is getting more love, care and property which makes Govindnarayan and Surekha distraught. Mukund breaks on realising that Vaishali married him only for getting Surekha Sadan on her name. Later, Rekha's family accepts their mistakes and realise the love of Govind & Surekha for them. Keshav also accepts Sundar. After a few events, a duplicate Titu also comes. But, at the end real Titu reconciles with his family. The Agrawal family becomes happy again and the show ends with Panchi's and Bhagwati's pregnancy, and another Nikhattu i.e. Panchi and Titu's son being born.

== Cast ==
- Priyansh Jora as Ashish ''Titu'' Agrawal
- Sonia Balani as Panchi Agrawal
- Akhilendra Mishra as Govindnarayan Agrawal
- Amita Khopkar as Surekha Agrawal
- Madhuri Sanjeev as Rekha Agrawal
- Gaurav Nanda as Gulshan
- Pooja Sharma as Vaishali Agrawal
- Neha Kaul as Bhagwati Agrawal
- Manav Verma as Keshav Agrawal
- Achherr Bhaardwaj as Mukund Agrawal
- Sohit Vijay Soni as Funny Hero
- Sagar Saini as Kamlesh Gupta
- Nivin Ramani as Chetan
- Sneha Shah as Pinky Agrawal
- Karan Khanna as Sudhir
- Harsh Chatrath as Golu
- Simran Pareenja as Rajni
- Twinkle Patel as Ruhi
- Ishita Ganguly as Juhi
- Shruti Rana as Rachna
- Mahesh Babu
- Amala Paul

== Reception ==
It is regarded as the biggest fiction launch of 2014. It ruled the 8 pm prime time slot with 7.3 TVM on its launch day becoming highest opening of the year.

The show was earlier named as "Mera Nikhatoo" but it was changed at last minute to "Tu Mera Hero".

The show is set in Mathura of Uttar Pradesh. This show is a tribute to Dilwale Dulhaniya Le Jayenge. Shashi Mittal, co-founder and director of Shashi Sumeet Productions said, "DDLJ is the biggest ever celebration of love and I am an avid fan myself. We wanted to pay a tribute to this story in our own way." However, she clarified, "By no means is this a copy of the film, but is a story of a girl whose life is dominated by the spirit of the film." Sumeet Hukamchand Mittal, co-founder and director, said "This story will be a tale that everyone will be able to connect with."

Before and during the course of the show, 10 directors were changed in 5 months.

== Mishap ==
The shoot of the show was disrupted after a fire broke out on the sets in Mira Road in December 2015 due to the air conditioner duct which got congested, because of which the fiber material caught fire. Luckily, none were injured.

== Awards ==
Year	Award	Category	Nominee	Result
2015	Indian Telly Awards	Best Fresh New Face	Priyansh Jora	Won
