= Sameeksha Sud =

Indian television actress and internet personality

- Born: April 25, 1993 (age 33)
- Occupations: Actress, Internet personality
- Years active: 2012–present
- Television: Baalveer Doli Armano Ki Ek Aastha Aisi Bhee

Sameeksha Sud (born 25 April 1993) is an Indian television actress and internet personality. She is best known for Baalveer, Doli Armaano Ki, and Ek Aastha Aisi Bhee.

== Career ==
Sud started her television career in 2012 and made her acting debut with Fear Files. She received prominence through Baalveer, in which she played Pari. She has also worked in Doli Armano Ki and Gumrah. In 2020, Sud made her OTT debut with Who's Your Daddy (season 2).

== Filmography ==
=== Television ===
Year	Title	Role	Notes	Ref.
2012	Fear Files			
2012	Gumrah			
2012	Baalveer	Dari Pari	Season 1	
2014–2015	Doli Armaano Ki	Asha Gaurav Singh		
2017	Ek Aastha Aisi Bhee	Janki Angad Agarwal		
2018	Tenali Rama	Sharda Devi	Season 1	
2025	Ghum Hai Kisikey Pyaar Meiin	Aditi Chavan		

=== Web series ===
Year	Title	Role	Ref.
2020	Who's Your Daddy	Sukoon Bagga	

=== Music videos ===
Year	Title	Singer	Ref.
2019	Raanjhan Ve	Purva Mantri	
2019	Dil Roya Ve	Akanksha Bhandari	
2019	Rula Ke Gaya Ishq	Stebin Ben	
2020	Tu Bhi Royega	Jyotica Tangri	
2020	Tumhari Yaad Ayee Hai	Goldie Sohel, Palak Muchhal	
2020	Mausam	Anshul Seth	
2020	Main Yeh Haath Jo	Samira Koppikar, Stebin Ben	
2020	Rona Likha Tha	Ramji Gulati	
2020	Dil Ki Aadat	Stebin Ben	
2021	Marda Chhod Gaya	Ramji Gulati	
2021	Dil Fakeera	Udit Saxena	
2021	Manada Nahi Dill	Romy, Shreya Jain	
2021	Teri Aankhein Badi Anmol	Yasser Desai	
2021	Laeja Mainu Naall	Kay J	
2021	Dil Wapis Kardo	Akshar, Nikhita Gandhi	
2021	Khwahish	Jyotica Tangri, Jitul Boro	
2022	Goa	Mr. Dee	
2022	Ki Kar Gaiyaan	Akriti Kakar	
