= Pavitra Bandhan =

- Logo
- Also known as: Pavitra Bandhan – Do Dilo Ka
- Genre: Indian Soap Opera; Romance
- Created by: Balaji Telefilms
- Developed by: Ekta Kapoor
- Screenplay by: Mallika Dutt Gharde; Komolika Bhattacharjee; Dialogues; Deepti Rawal
- Story by: Mallika Dutt Gharde; Komolika Bhattacharjee
- Directed by: Ghanshyam Pathak, Vaibhav aka Vicky Chauhan,
- Creative directors: Meghana Amal & Shivani Pathak
- Starring: Yash Tonk; Hritu Dudhani; Muni Jha
- Opening theme: "Pavitra Bandhan – Do Dilo Ka" by Priya Bhattacharya
- Composer: Lalit Sen
- Country of origin: India
- Original languages: Hindi; Bengali; English
- No. of seasons: 1
- No. of episodes: 780

Production
- Executive producer: Dinesh Singh
- Producers: Ekta Kapoor; Shobha Kapoor
- Production locations: Mumbai, Maharashtra, India
- Editors: Editor; Sanjeev Shukla; Mohammad Salim; Associative Editor; Shobhnath Rai; Online Editor; Vatan Sinh; Ramesh Pandey; Gopal Rai; Raju Tiwari
- Camera setup: Multi-camera
- Running time: Approx. 24 minutes
- Production company: Balaji Telefilms

Original release
- Network: DD National
- Release: 9 September 2013 – 8 December 2016

Pavitra Bandhan – Do Dilon Ka (English: Sacred Bond - Of Two Hearts) is an Indian soap opera created by Ekta Kapoor under her banner Balaji Telefilms and co-produced by Ekta Kapoor and Shobha Kapoor. The show aired every Monday to Friday at 8:30 PM on DD National. Yash Tonk and Hritu Dudhani play the protagonists.

== Plot ==
This romantic drama series revolves around the protagonists Girish and Aashima who, under unreliable circumstances, marry each other but eventually fall in love. The show explores the other dramas of their families and children. After some misunderstandings which culminate to a divorce, the two unite again. During that time, Aashima becomes pregnant, but because Girish knows that Sameer (Girish's cousin) also has feelings for Aashima, he suspects it is Sameer's child and begins to hate Aashima. In the end, she decides to leave him, but when she does, she has an accident and loses her eyesight.

The show then takes a seven-year leap.

After the leap, the show starts with a new entry, seven-year-old Sahil (Sanay Somaiya), who is actually the son of Aashima and Girish. Girish is unaware of all this. The show explores how Sahil gets Aashima and Girish back together.

== Cast ==
- Yash Tonk as Girish Roy Choudhary
- Hritu Dudani as Aashima Roy Choudhary
- Sanay Somaiya as Sahil Roy Choudhary child artist
- Yamini Thakur as Chandra Rajkumar
- Muni Jha
- Rujut Dahiya as Vikram
- Resha Konkar as Shibani
- Shailley Kaushik
- Shalini Arora
- Madan Joshi
- Manmohan Tiwari as Rajkumar
- Sahil Uppal as Aarav Seth
- Ashima Ahmed as Gehna Aarav Seth
- Preet Singh as Deb Roy Choudhary
- Leesha Bhalerao as Pakhi
- Aakash Talwar as Sameer Basu
- Ekta Methai as young Shonali Roy Choudhary
- Drishti Hemdev as young Mishti Roy Choudhary
- Chahat Pandey as Mishti Roy Choudhary
- Fahad Ali as Mayank
- Anjali singh as Tapasya
