= Still Reading Khan =

2006 biographical book by Mushtaq Shiekh

- Author: Mushtaq Shiekh
- Language: English
- Subject: Shah Rukh Khan
- Genre: Biography
- Published: 11 October 2006
- Publisher: Om Books International
- Publication place: India
- Media type: Print
- Pages: 458
- ISBN: 978-81-871077-9-8

Still Reading Khan is a 2006 biographical book that was written by the Indian author and journalist Mushtaq Shiekh, chronicling the life of the actor Shah Rukh Khan. The book describes his birth in 1965 in New Delhi, his marriage to Gauri Chibber in 1991, with whom he has two children, and his sixteen-year-long career as an actor, film producer, and television presenter.

== Development and writing ==
Mushtaq Shiekh was a journalist for the Chitralekha magazine when he met Shah Rukh Khan at a festival in 1995 to interview him there. He became a friend of his, sharing ideas related to the cinema from which he later published a film starring the actor, titled The Making of Aśoka in 2001 since when he left his journalistic career. When Shiekh told Khan that he would write a book on him, he initially take the idea as a joke. Announced in November 2005, the book was later titled Still Reading Khan; according to Shiekh, the word still metaphorically means that Khan "was sitting for a portrait, and I was doing the reading. And it also sounded like I'm reading him, and I'm going to still continue." Research for the book took four years, with one year was used to interview Khan and his wife Gauri Khan.

== Release ==
Still Reading Khan was released by Om Books International in Mumbai on 11 October 2006 and in New Delhi, London, and the Middle East around the same time. Shiekh said that he had a total of 900-page information about Khan in his mind, but published the book with only around 450 pages as the editing would be harder for him and later planned for a sequel book. Shiekh hired several translator to translated it in Marathi, Gujarati, Hindi, and Urdu.

== Critical reception ==
Kaveree Bamzai of India Today said, "Sheikh has done a lot of commendable work collecting rare photographs and unusual memories from practically every player in the actor's life. Pity he didn't have a good editor to say cut."
