= Kajal Nishad =

Indian actress

- Born: 1 June 1982 (age 44); Bombay, Maharashtra, India
- Other name: Kajal
- Occupations: Actress; Politician; Poet; Comedian
- Years active: 2009–present
- Political party: Samajwadi Party (2021–present)
- Other political affiliations: Indian National Congress (till 2021)
- Spouse: Sanjay Nishad

Kajal Nishad, (born 1 June 1982) also known professionally as Kajal, is an Indian actress and politician. She has acted in a number of TV series and Bhojpuri films, though is best known for her character Chameli in the SAB TV comedy show Lapataganj (2009-2010) and Bhojpuri film Shaadi Biyah. She was engaged in another of the channel's serial, Tota Weds Maina, where she portrayed the role of Ram Katori Chachi. She also played the role of Kanak Tripathi in Colors TV's Ishq Ka Rang Safed.

== Personal life ==
Born in Mumbai, her parents are from Kutch Gujarat and settled in Mumbai. She is married to Bhojpuri film producer Sanjay Nishad, who is from the Bhauapaar village in Gorakhpur district.

== Political career ==
She joined politics as a member of Indian National Congress Party. She contested the 2012 Uttar Pradesh election from Gorakhpur (Rural) constituency as a youth-wing Indian Youth Congress candidate, wherein she finished at fourth place.

In 2022, she again contested the Uttar Pradesh election from Caimpiyarganj constituency, where she finished in the second place.

In the 2024 general election, she became the Samajwadi Party and INDIA alliance's candidate from Gorakhpur. She finished in the second place.

== Filmography ==
=== Films ===
- Sej Taiyar Sajaniya Farar (2009, Bhojpuri)
- Shaadi Biyah (2010, Bhojpuri)
- Takrao (2018, Bhojpuri)

=== TV series ===
- Lapataganj (2009–2010) – Chameli
- Tota Weds Maina – Ram Katori Chachi
- Ishq Ka Rang Safed (2015–2016) – Kanak Tripathi

== See also ==
- List of Bhojpuri cinema actresses
