= Zahida Parveen =

Indian actress

- Occupation: Actress
- Years active: 1995-present
- Children: Gungun Parveen

Zahida Parveen is an Indian actress. She is most known for playing Badi in Thief of Baghdad, the evil Yashodhara Masi in Yahaaan Main Ghar Ghar Kheli and Gayatri Scindia in Punar Vivah.

She was also seen in Zee TV’s Aap Ke Aa Jane Se.

== Personal life ==
Parveen hails from Jaipur. She is widowed and has a daughter, Anahita.

== Television ==
Year	Show	Role	Channel	Notes
1997	Shaktimaan	Nisha Saluja	DD National	
2000-2001	Thief of Baghdad	Badi	Zee TV	
2002-2003	Kammal	Shabo	Zee TV	
2009-2010	Jyoti	Padma Devi	Imagine TV	
2010	Mata Ki Chowki	Sanyukta Gautam Kumar	Sahara One	
2012-2013	Punar Vivah	Gayatri Scindia	Zee TV	
2015-2016	Siya Ke Ram	Trijata	Star Plus	
2017	Ghulaam	Gulguli Bhisma Pratap Chaudhary	Life OK	
2019	Aap Ke Aa Jaane Se	Rekha Singh	Zee TV	
