= Aap Ke Aa Jane Se =

Indian Hindi-language television show

- Genre: Romance, Supernatural, Dramedy
- Written by: Preeti Mamgain
- Directed by: Shashank Bharadwaj; Sumit Sodani
- Creative director: Persis Siganporia
- Starring: Suhasi Dhami; Karan Jotwani
- Country of origin: India
- Original language: Hindi
- No. of seasons: 2
- No. of episodes: 357

Production
- Producers: Sukesh Motwani; Mautik Tolia
- Production locations: Mumbai, Maharashtra, India
- Cinematography: Neeshank Mathure
- Camera setup: Multi-camera
- Running time: 22 minutes
- Production company: Bodhi Tree Multimedia Pvt. Ltd.

Original release
- Network: Zee TV
- Release: 15 January 2018 – 31 May 2019

Aap Ke Aa Jane Se (English meaning-By Your Arrival) (international title: Age is Just a Number) is an Indian soap opera which aired on Zee TV from 15 January 2018 to 31 May 2019. It is produced by Bodhi Tree Multimedia and it starred Suhasi Dhami and Karan Jotwani as Vedika and Sahil. The show marked the comeback of Dhami after a three-year break from television. It replaced Dil Dhoondta Hai in its timeslot and was replaced by Hamari Bahu Silk.

== Seasons ==
Season	Episodes	Originally aired	
Season	Episodes	First aired	Last aired
1	328	15 January 2018	22 April 2019
2	29	23 April 2019	31 May 2019

== Plot ==
Vedika Mathur, a 42-year-old, simple and single mother, lives with her mother, Manjula and 15-year-old daughter, Arya. Sahil Agarwal, a 24-year-old irresponsible young man, returns to his home where his aunt, Bimla, the family matriarch, fixes his wedding to his friend, Nidhi, but he declines and is thrown out. Vedika, who is in need of money rents out a room in her home to Sahil. During this period, Sahil forms a bond with Arya and Manjula, while Vedika tries to keep a platonic relationship between them as a landlady and tenant. Sahil falls in love with Vedika and confesses this, but Vedika rejects him due to their age gap and social problems. Soon enough, she realizes her love for Sahil, though in denial, but eventually accepts it.

A rich man named Yash, who wants revenge on Bimla, makes an entry and reveals his relationship with the Agarwal's. Although against Vedika and Sahil's union, Bimla is revealed to be a hypocrite as she had once seduced a married man, five years younger than her, for his wealth. He then threw out Yash and his mother on Bimla's behest. Vedika is forced to marry Yash. Later, he is diagnosed with cancer and asks Vedika to give him a child. They both decide on IVF, but due to a nurse's mistake, Sahil becomes the donor for Yash and Vedika's child. Vedika's distant cousin arrives in Kanpur and along with Arya, try and help Sahil win over Vedika. Soon, Yash dies, leaving Vedika a widow once again.

Not wanting Sahil and Vedika to unite, Bimla poisons Sahil's mother, Anjana. When she finds out that Vedika is pregnant with Sahil's baby, Anjana happily goes to Vedika's house to propose marriage. Sahil hears of this from Bimla and he too goes to see Vedika. The poison takes effect at Vedika's house, where Anjana falls down the stairs and dies. Sahil arrives at that moment and misunderstands Vedika to be the culprit and has her jailed. In a fit of rage, Sahil marries Bhumi in prison. Vedika delivers a son while Bimla's daughter, Gauri delivers a daughter in the same hospital. Bimla replaces Vedika's son with a stillborn child and flees. Meanwhile, Gauri's husband, Deepak exchanges that same stillborn baby with his daughter as he wanted a son.

Vedika leaves the city with Gauri's daughter and Bimla lies to Sahil that Vedika has abandoned her child. Sahil names the baby Ved and adopts him, unaware that the child is his.

Vedika returns to Kanpur with her daughter, Sadika while Sahil lives with Bhumi and Ved. Arya returns to India after her studies. Vedika soon learns that Sadika is Gauri and Deepak's daughter, and Ved is her real son. Later, Sahil also learns Ved is his son and Anjana was killed by Bimla. Enraged, he leaves her and Bhumi; reunites with Vedika. Ved is in need of a bone marrow transplant from his full sibling and thus Vedika gets pregnant with Sahil's child. Sahil is presumed dead after falling off a cliff, but is rescued by his lookalike, Jackie, who turned out to his twin brother. Prachi's husband, Puneesh, kills Jackie, assuming him to be Sahil. Sahil returns to the Agarwals' as Jackie with Jackie's adoptive family and reveals the truth to Vedika. They together expose Puneesh. Arya and Guddu, Jackie's adoptive brother, fall in love and marry.

Having lost his memory, Sahil unintentionally marries Pankti, to save her from her politician father, Tej Pratap Singh. Vedika delivers another son, Virat, and Ved recovers. Sahil and Vedika find a partner for Pankti and she leaves with him. Bimla's long-lost son, Kshitij comes to destroy Agarwals and kills Guddu, framing Sahil. Arya marries Kshitij for revenge but realises that Sahil is innocent and that Kshitij is responsible for Guddu's death. Later, he kidnaps Ved and Virat, but Sahil and Vedika manage to save them with Arya's help. Enraged, Kshitij shoots Sahil and Vedika. The two fall down a cliff and die vowing to reunite in their next lives to complete their love story.

Vedika and Sahil are reborn. Reborn Vedika is a 32-year-old caring and kind-hearted divorcee. Reborn Sahil is a 26-year-old carefree man, who falls for her but is engaged to her sister, Avantika. The two meet the now old Manjula, who reveals they're reborn. Avantika runs away from her wedding and Sahil and Vedika get married. Regretting her decision and being greedy, Avantika teams up with Tanuj, Vedika's ex-husband, to separate them. Tanuj kidnaps Vedika, but is killed by her. Avantika is exposed and arrested. Sahil and Vedika regain their memories of their past life and remarry to unite forever.

== Cast ==
=== Main ===
- Suhasi Dhami as
  - Vedika Gupta Agarwal – Manjula's daughter; Rohit's sister; Anurag and Yash's widow; Sahil Agarwal's wife; Arya, Ved and Virat's mother; Sadika's adoptive mother. (2018–2019)
  - Vedika Pratab Kashyap – Reborn Vedika; Prem and Prabha's elder daughter; Avantika's sister; Tanuj's ex-wife; Sahil Kashyap's wife. (2019)
- Karan Jotwani as
  - Sahil Agarwal – Rishab and Anjana's elder son; Jackie and Shruti's brother; Bhumi and Pankti's ex-husband; Vedika Agarwal's husband; Ved and Virat's father; Arya's step-father. (2018–2019)
  - Jackie Agarwal – Rishab and Anjana's younger son; Omprakash and Usha's adopted son; Sahil and Shruti's brother; Guddu and Mandakini's adopted brother (2018–2019)
  - Sahil Kashyap – Reborn Sahil; Shashi and Rekha's son; Geet's brother; Avantika's ex-fiancé; Vedika Kashyap's husband. (2019)

=== Recurring ===
- Hetal Gada as Arya Mathur Agarwal – Vedika Agarwal and Anurag's daughter; Sahil Agarwal's step-daughter; Ved and Virat's half-sister; Guddu's widow; Kshitij's wife. (2018–2019)
- Geeta Tyagi as Bimla Devi Agarwal – Ishwar's widow; Prachi, Gauri and Kshitij's mother; Sadika's grandmother. (2018–2019)
- Aekam Binjwe as Ved Agarwal – Vedika Agarwal and Sahil Agarwal's elder son; Bhumi's adopted son; Virat's brother; Arya's half-brother. (2018–2019)
- Unknown as Virat Agarwal – Vedika Agarwal and Sahil Agarwal's younger son; Ved's brother; Arya's half-brother. (2019)
- Richa Bhattacharya as Manjula Gupta – Vedika Agarwal and Rohit's mother; Arya, Ved and Virat's grandmother. (2018–2019)
- Barsha Chatterjee as Maya Srinivasan Awasti – Vedika Agarwal's best friend; Raghav's wife. (2018–2019)
- Micckie Dudaaney as Tanuj Malhotra – Vedika Kashyap's ex-husband. (2019)
- Manisha Rawat as Avantika Pratab – Prem and Prabha's younger daughter; Vedika Kashyap's sister; Sahil Kashyap's ex-fiancé. (2019)
- Harish Chhabra as Prem Pratab – Chetna's brother; Prabha's husband; Vedika Kashyap and Avantika's father. (2019)
- Hetal Yadav as Prabha Somani Pratab – Prem's wife; Vedika Kashyap and Avantika's mother. (2019)
- Simran Gangwani as Chetna Pratab – Prem's sister; Vedika Kashyap and Avantika's aunt. (2019)
- Yajuvendra Singh as Shashi Kashyap – Dheeraj's brother; Rekha's husband; Sahil Kashyap and Geet's father. (2019)
- Zahida Parveen as Rekha Singh Kashyap – Shashi's wife; Sahil Kashyap and Geet's mother. (2019)
- Sonali Jha as Geet Kashyap – Shashi and Rekha's daughter; Sahil Kashyap's sister. (2019)
- Vishnu Sharma as Dheeraj Kashyap – Shashi's brother; Meena's husband. (2019)
- Leena Acharya as Meena Soni Kashyap – Dheeraj's wife. (2019)
- Mitali Pandey as Sakshi – Vedika Kashyap's friend. (2019)
- Manish Goplani as Kshitij "Krish" Agarwal – Ishwar and Bimla's son; Prachi and Gauri's brother; Yash's half-brother; Arya's second husband. (2019)
- Alice Kaushik as Daisy – Jackie's girlfriend. (2018)
- Ashish Dixit as Guddu Srivastav: Omprakash and Usha's son; Mandakini's brother; Jackie's adopted brother; Arya's first husband. (2018–2019)
- Deepali Saini as Mandakini Srivastav: Omprakash and Usha's daughter; Guddu's sister; Jackie's adopted sister. (2018–2019)
- Ekta Sharma as Usha Juneja Srivastav: Omprakash's wife; Guddu and Mandakini's mother; Jackie's adoptive mother. (2018–2019)
- Resha Konkar as Gauri Agarwal – Ishwar and Bimla's younger daughter; Prachi and Kshitij's sister; Yash's half-sister; Deepak and Manish's ex-wife; Sadika's mother. (2018–2019)
- Shailesh Gulabani as Deepak Ramnani – Gauri's ex-husband; Shruti's husband; Sadika's father. (2018–2019)
- Hannah Chaudhary as Sadika Ramnani – Gauri and Deepak's daughter; Vedika's adoptive daughter. (2018)
- Kshitija Saxena as Shruti Agarwal Ramnani – Rishab and Anjana's daughter; Sahil Agarwal and Jackie's sister; Karan's ex-wife; Deepak's wife. (2018–2019)
- Nidhi Mathur as Prachi Agarwal Tiwari – Ishwar and Bimla's elder daughter; Gauri and Kshitij's sister; Yash's half-sister; Puneesh's wife. (2018–2019)
- Karan Mehat as Puneesh Tiwari – Prachi's husband. (2018–2019)
- Jannat Zubair Rahmani as Pankti Singh: Tejpratap and Sadhana's daughter; Sahil Agarwal's ex-wife. (2019)
- Amit Behl as Politician Tejpratap Singh: Sadhana's husband; Pankti's father. (2019)
- Neetu Pandey as Sadhana Singh: Tejpratap's wife; Pankti's mother. (2019)
- Amit Bhanushali as Karan Verma: Sahil's best friend; Shruti's ex-husband. (2018)
- Priyanka Purohit as Bhumi Agarwal – Sahil Agarwal's ex-wife; Ved's adoptive mother. (2018–2019)
- Abhiroy Singh as Yash Agarwal – Ishwar and Leela's son; Gauri, Prachi and Kshitij's half-brother; Vedika's late husband. (2018)
- Rudrakshi Gupta as Anjana Mehrotra Agarwal – Rishab's wife; Sahil Agarwal, Jackie and Shruti's mother; Ved and Virat's grandmother; Arya's step-grandmother. (2018)
- Mehul Bhojak as Manish Mehta – Gauri's ex-husband. (2018)
- Ravish Dumra as Tushar – Puneesh's cousin son; Arya's friend. (2018)
- Priyal Gor as Chameli / Fake Vedika – A woman who pretend as Vedika after her missing. (2018)
- Shaily Priya Pandey / Jazz Sodhi as Nidhi Tripathi – Sunanda's daughter; Mohit's sister; Sahil Agarwal's childhood friend and ex-fiancée. (2018)
- Nidhi Vikram as Sunanda Tripathi – Nidhi and Mohit's mother. (2018)
- Varun Tiwari as Mohit Tripathi – Sunanda's son; Nidhi's brother. (2018)
- Shantanu Monga as Rohit Gupta – Manjula's son; Vedika Agarwal's brother; Kiran's husband. (2018)
- Iti Kaurav as Kiran Gupta – Rohit's wife. (2018)
- Rudra Kaushish as Sunil Mathur – Anurag's brother; Arya's uncle. (2018)
- Mohit Daga as Gautam – Vedika's boss. (2018)

=== Guests ===
- Ravi Dubey and Nia Sharma from Jamai Raja (2018)
- Shraddha Arya as Preeta from Kundali Bhagya (2018)
- Neelam Mehra from Kundali Bhagya (2018)
