= Ishq Ka Rang Safed =

Indian television series

- Genre: Drama
- Created by: Rupali Guha; Susmita Bhattacharya
- Screenplay by: Gitangshu Dey
- Story by: Abhijit Sinha
- Directed by: Uttam Ahlawat, Shahnawaz Khan; Nitin Mahesh Chaudhary
- Creative directors: Upasna Mann; Sameer Khurana
- Starring: See below
- Theme music composer: Gaurav Dasgupta; Roshan Balu
- Composer: Vihaan Akash
- Country of origin: India
- Original language: Hindi
- No. of seasons: 1
- No. of episodes: Indi 345 / Int 171

Production
- Executive producer: Amit Chandra
- Producers: Rupali Guha; Kalyan Guha
- Cinematography: Abhishek Basu; Ankit Chouksey; Ravi Baliyan
- Editor: Sagar Patil
- Camera setup: Multi-camera
- Running time: Approx. 25 minutes
- Production company: Film Farm India Pvt. Ltd.

Original release
- Network: Colors TV
- Release: 10 August 2015 – 26 August 2016

Ishq Ka Rang Safed (transl. White is the color of love) is an Indian Hindi-language television drama series. That aired on Colors TV from 10 August 2015 to 26 August 2016. The show portrays the story of a young widow, Dhaani, and a rich boy, Viplav, who falls in love with her and goes against the orthodox views of society to marry her. The show was mostly accepted by the viewers and gave tough competition to Star Plus's Suhani Si Ek Ladki.

Rekha Bhardwaj re-recorded content from her 2011 album Kabir Chaura Sufi Chaura for the show. The program was later telecasted on Colors Rishtey as Mohe Rang Do Laal.

== Plot ==
Viplav Tripathi, the carefree grandson of Dashrath Tripathi, meets Dhaani, a young widow on the bank of the river Ganges in the holy city of Banaras. Dhaani lives with her mother in a widow refuge (aashram). Viplav, a law graduate, plans to go to the US for further studies. They get off to a bad start, and Viplav takes revenge from Dhaani for disrespecting him but soon realizes his mistake. Viplav continues to play pranks on Dhaani, but eventually genuinely apologizes.

Dashrath sends Viplav to Delhi, and tries to have the aashram vacated. Viplav arrives just in time to fight the court case on behalf of the widows. Viplav's parents try to get him engaged to his childhood friend, Tanya but Viplav calls off the engagement. When he saves Dhaani from drowning, his half brother, Tripurari, takes photographs to defame Dhaani. An enraged Viplav decides to live with the widows till their problems are solved.

Dhaani and Viplav become friends. After helping the widows, Viplav returns home. Viplav's parents again create misunderstandings leading to Dhaani and Viplav breaking off their friendship. Dhaani is made to get engaged to Tripurari but Viplav stops their wedding in the nick of time after discovering Tripurari had gotten another widow, Suvarna, pregnant.

Viplav's mother, Kanak, employs Tripurari to get Dhaani killed but Viplav saves her. He is, however, injured and Dhaani and he take refuge in a woman's cottage pretending to be a married couple. They spend several days together during which Viplav falls in love with her. Tripurari catches up with them and when they are brought to Banaras, Viplav declares his love for Dhaani and announces he will marry her. A confused Dhaani rejects his proposal but when he pretends to leave for the US she realises her feelings for him and happily accepts.

Kanak and Dashrath create several problems for the couple leading to them arguing but eventually Viplav sees through their plans and he and Dhaani marry in a temple. At home, they find a family visiting Viplav's house to arrange a marriage alliance for his sister, Shalu and decide not to share the news.

Shalu is engaged to Raja who, unbeknownst to all, turns out to be Dhaani's ex-husband's brother. Raja is looking for his brother's wife, Suman (now Dhaani), who he blames for his brother's death and enlists Viplav's help. Dhaani realises Raja's identity and stops the wedding. She is arrested for her husband's death and Viplav decides to fight her case. She reveals that her husband was an alcoholic and her mother-in-law beat her. On the night of his death, Raja tried to force himself on her and in trying to save her, her drunk husband fell off a balcony and died. In court, instigated by the opposing lawyer, Viplav announces he is Dhaani's husband shocking everyone. He presents evidence that exonerates Dhaani and takes her home.

Dashrath pretends to accept her, while Kanak and Shalu are against her. Shalu gets manipulated by Raja, and marries him. Viplav and Dhaani come up with multiple plans to expose Raja. Finally, Raja's father helps them and Raja is revealed to be a married man who goes around conning women for their money. Raja is thrown out and Shalu asks forgiveness. As the family get together to perform a pooja, Raja returns to attack Dhaani but Viplav gets in the way and is injured. Dhaani beats up Raja who is finally arrested and Viplav is rushed to the hospital. Kanak blames Dhaani for her son's condition. Dhaani prays and Viplav recovers.

Dashrath's sister comes to live with the family. Dadi Bua wants to find a suitable girl for Viplav and the family lie to her that Dhaani is a nurse caring for him. Dadi Bua introduces Kaamini as a suitable match. As days pass, Shalu marries Pankaj. When Dhaani is asked to leave the house, Viplav brings her back and announces that they are married shocking Dadi Bua and Kaamini. Dadi Bua convinces Kaamini to stay on.

Kaamini befriends Viplav and Dhaani. Wanting to surprise Viplav, Dhaani asks Kaamini for help to attend school. Kaamini sends her to night school and makes trying to make Viplav suspicious. Dhaani succeeds at school and Viplav finally finds out and is proud of her. Kaamini creates misunderstandings between the couple causing Dhaani to move to the aashram when she discovers she is pregnant. She writes a letter to Viplav which Kaamini intercepts. Later that night, Kaamini gets Viplav drunk and makes it look like they have been intimate. A heartbroken Dhaani decides to leave the city for good. Tripurari plants a bomb at the aashram that goes off killing everyone.

=== Five Years later ===
Dhaani (now played by Sanjeeda Sheikh) lives in Mumbai with her mother and daughter in a chawl and is helped by Parshya, a former goon while Viplav is in Banaras living with Dhaani's memories. He has married Kaamini and is father to a young boy Atharva. As fate would have it, Viplav and Dhaani meet at a wedding in Mumbai where Dhaani is working as a flower decorator. Dhaani behaves coldly towards him and Viplav gets disheartened.

Once again, Kaamini creates misunderstandings causing Dhaani to decide on marrying Parshya. Viplav is heartbroken at the separation from Dhaani and their daughter, Vidha. On the wedding day, Vidha faints and is rushed to the hospital thus halting the wedding ceremony.

Daadi bua returns and reveals everything. An emotional reunion takes place as Viplav and Dhaani now plan to make Tripurari and Kaamini pay for their misdeeds. Finally, all the culprits are sent to prison after they confess their crimes. Viplav, Dhaani along with Vidha and Atharva, then live happily in the aashram reminiscing the happier moments of their past.

== Cast ==
=== Main ===
- Eisha Singh as Dhaani Tripathi (a.k.a. Dhaani Awasthi)
  - Sanjeeda Sheikh replaced (Eisha Singh) as Dhani Tripathi (May–August 2016)
- Mishal Raheja as Viplav Tripathi

=== Recurring ===
- Dakssh Ajit Singh / Rumi Khan as Tripurari Tripathi, Dashrath's illegitimate son
- Ishita Ganguly as Kamini Tripathi, Viplav's second wife
- Unknown as Vidha Tripathi, Viplav and Dhaani's daughter
- Unknown as Atharva, Chandan and Kaamini's son
- Pratima Kazmi as Indrani
- Vividha Kirti as Raj Lakshmi
- Garima Vikrant Singh as Dulari
- Anshul Trivedi as Parshya Kulkarni, Dhaani's friend in Mumbai who is about to marry her
- Arun Bakshi as Mahant Dashrath Tripathi, Viplav and Shalu's grandfather
- Vidya Sinha as Sushma Tripathi, Viplav and Shalu's grandmother, Dashrath's wife
- Kajal Nishad as Kanak Tripathi, Viplav and Shalu's mother
- Khushbu Thakkar as Shalini "Shalu", Viplav's younger sister
- Nishikant Dixit as Shambhu Tripathi
- Lavanya Bhardwaj as Pankaj, Shalu's husband
- Shubhangi Latkar as Durga
- Amardeep Jha as Dadi Bua, Viplav and Shalu's great aunt, Dashrath's sister
- Mudrika Gupta as Richa
- Vandana Singh as Swarna Tripurari Tripathi, Dhaani's friend and a fellow widow at the aashram
- Jasveer Kaur as Bijli
- Aakash Talwar as Ram Chaturvedi
- Snehal Rai as Tanya Vajpayee, Viplav's ex-fiancée
- Barsha Chatterjee as Rachna
- Rashami Desai as Tulsi
- Khushwant Walia as Raja Awasthi, Shalu's ex-husband, Dhaani's 1st husband's younger brother
- Gulfam Khan as Mrs. Awasthi, Raja and his dead brother's mother, Dhaani's former mother-in-law
- Guddi Maruti as Raja's aunt
- Ahmad Harhash as Rudra Chatturvedi his Shalini aunt

=== Special Guests ===
- Jigyasa Singh as Thapki from Thapki Pyar Ki
- Manish Goplani as Bihaan Pandey from Thapki Pyar Ki
- Jaya Bhattacharya as Vasundhara Pandey from Thapki Pyaar Ki
- Monica Khanna as Shraddha Pandey from Thapki Pyaar Ki
- Pooja Sahu as Suman Pandey from Thapki Pyaar Ki
- Resham Thakkar as Preeti Pandey from Thapki Pyaar Ki
