= Achherr Bhaardwaj =

Indian television actor

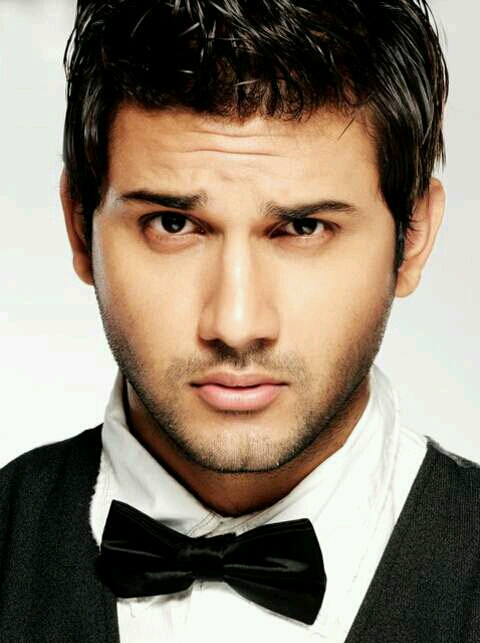
- Bhaardwaj in 2016
- Occupations: Actor; model
- Years active: 2014–present
- Notable work: Tu Mera Hero as Mukund Agarwal

Achherr Bhaardwaj is an Indian television actor, known for his role Mukund Agarwal in Tu Mera Hero.

== Television ==
Year	Title	Role
2014–2015	Tu Mera Hero	Mukund Agarwal
2016	Krishnadasi	David Fernandes / Devesh
2017	Pehredaar Piya Ki	Mohakpratap Singh
2017–2018	Rishta Likhenge Hum Naya	Mohakpratap Singh
2020–2021	Shaadi Mubarak	Sumedh Kothari
2020–2021	Aye Mere Humsafar	Lakhan Kothari
2021	Amma Ke Babu Ki Baby	Preet
2022	Mose Chhal Kiye Jaaye	Amreek
