= Detective Didi =

- Genre: Detective, Drama, Romantic
- Created by: Ila Bedi Dutta
- Developed by: Ila Bedi Dutta
- Written by: Ila Bedi Dutta; Sanjay Kumar; Ruchika Kaushik Tiwari; Styam K. Tripathi; Girish D Malavika Asthana; Sohaam Abhiram
- Directed by: Jackson Sethi
- Creative director: Bunty
- Starring: Sonia Balani; Manish Goplani
- Country of origin: India
- Original language: Hindi
- No. of seasons: 1
- No. of episodes: 24

Production
- Producers: Ila Bedi Dutta; Rohit Vaid
- Camera setup: Multi-camera
- Running time: 40 minutes
- Production company: Trilogy Krikos Production

Original release
- Network: Zee TV; ZEE5
- Release: 9 December 2017 – 17 March 2018

Detective Didi is an Indian detective television series that premiered on 9 December 2017 and airs on zee TV. The series is produced by Trilogy Krikos Production. It stars Sonia Balani and Manish Goplani.

== Plot ==
Bunty (Sonia Balani) is the only woman of the house who gets the bread and butter home by solving the cases with her partner Bhim Singh Bhullar (Manish Goplani) who she later marries. Her grandfather and uncle don't make any money and are widowers. Her father is disabled and in a wheelchair after an accident where he lost his wife. Bunty is left with her deceased elder sister's son. She basically runs the house. She takes up the smaller cases of busting a wife's infidelity to solving a kidnapping case where kids are smuggled or killed. Obviously, there's a lot of danger also involved in her job.
