= Piya Rangrezz =

Indian drama television series

- Genre: Drama
- Created by: Sphere Origins
- Screenplay by: Mahesh Pandey; Vikram Khurana; Dialogues; Axmal Donwaar
- Story by: Vivek Bahl
- Directed by: Santram Verma, Sumit Thakur; Rajesh Ram Singh, Ismail Umar Khan
- Creative director: Snehil Dixit Mehra
- Starring: Gaurav S Bajaj; Narayani Shastri Keertida Mistry; Kanwar Dhillon
- Theme music composer: Raju Singh
- Country of origin: India
- Original language: Hindi
- No. of seasons: 6
- No. of episodes: 275

Production
- Producers: Sunjoy Waddhwa; Comall Sunjoy W
- Production locations: Azamgarh, Uttar Pradesh
- Editor: Afzal Shaikh
- Camera setup: Multi-camera
- Running time: 20 minutes
- Production company: Sphere Origins

Original release
- Network: Life OK
- Release: 27 April 2015 – 26 May 2016

Piya Rangrezz is an Indian television series that premiered on Life OK from 27 April 2015 to 26 May 2016. The series was produced by Sphere Origins and was set in Uttar Pradesh. It starred Gaurav S Bajaj, Keertida Mistry, Narayani Shastri and Kanwar Dhillon.

== Plot ==
Sher Singh, a powerful young man, is madly in love with a shy and soft-spoken Shraddha. He will do anything to win her love even if it means fighting his mother with whom he shares a strong bond.

== Cast ==
=== Main ===
- Narayani Shastri as Bhanwari Singh: Sher's mother; Shamsher and Arjun's grandmother
- Gaurav S Bajaj as
  - Sher Singh: Shraddha's husband; Shamsher and Arjun's father (2015) (Dead)
  - Shamsher Singh: Sher and Shraddha's son; Arjun's brother; Aaradhya's husband (2015–2016)
- Keertida Mistry as Shraddha Singh: Sher's wife; Shamsher and Arjun's mother
- Kanwar Dhillon as Arjun Singh: Sher and Shraddha's son; Shamsher's brother
- Gulki Joshi / Sreejita De as Dr. Aaradhya Singh: Shamsher's wife

=== Recurring ===
- Shivshakti Sachdev as Chanda: Sher's lover
- Neha Bagga as Moonmoon Singh
- Afzaal Khan as Munna Singh
- Parv Kaila as Veer Singh
- Sahil Phull as Virat
- Rajat Dahiya as Vikas Singh
- Prabhjeet Kaur as Sunheri Singh
- Rehan Sayed as Sumer Singh
- Shalu Shreya as Gajra
- Naman Shaw as Aditya Pratap Singh
- Sanjay Batra as Politician Nirmal Pandey
- Vibha Chibber / Niyati Joshi as Mrs. Singh (Dadi)
- Sakib Hossain as Thakur Veerendra Pratap
- Nishikant Dixit as Mukund Mishra
