= Barsha Chatterjee =

Indian actress

- Born: Barsha Chatterjee
- Occupation: Actor
- Years active: 2000-present
- Notable work: Ishq Ka Rang Safed; Aap Ke Aa Jane Se

Barsha Chatterjee is an Indian actress who works in Bollywood film and television industry. She has acted in Ishq Ka Rang Safed, Aap Ke Aa Jane Se, Kahaani Ghar Ghar Kii and she is acting in Barrister Babu.

== Television ==
Year	Title	Role	Ref
2000-2008	Kahaani Ghar Ghar Kii	Shivangi Ishaan Kaul	
2011-2014	Bade Achhe Lagte Hain		
2014-2016	Neeli Chatri Waale		
2015-2016	Ishq Ka Rang Safed	Rachna	
2018-2019	Aap Ke Aa Jane Se	Maya Srinivasan	
2019	Udaan	Jaya Sharma	
2020-2021	Barrister Babu	Devoleena Jadhav	
2024-2025	Jhanak	Anuradha Chatterjee	

== Web series ==
Year	Title
2018	What The Folks
