= Preeti Puri =

Indian television actress

Preeti Puri Choudhary
- Born: 7 December; Mumbai, Maharashtra, India
- Occupation: Television Actress
- Years active: 1997–present
- Height: 5 ft 8 in (1.73 m)
- Spouse: Vipin Choudhary(m.2010)
- Children: Kabir Choudhary(born 2015)

Preeti Puri Choudhary (born 7 December) is an Indian television actress.

== Television ==
Year	Serial	Role
	Kahiin To Hoga	Mauli Sinha
	Kkehna Hai Kuch Mujhko	
	Kyunki Saas Bhi Kabhi Bahu Thi	
	Kya Hadsaa Kya Haqeeqat	Kavita Hassanandani
	Kasautii Zindagii Kay	
	K. Street Pali Hill	Janvi
2006–2007	Mamta	Tanisha Akshay Srivastav / Tanisha Karan Srivastav / Tanisha Vikram Oberoi
2007–2008	Naaginn	Naagrani
2008–2010	Sapna Babul Ka... Bidaai	Avni Naveen Rajvansh
2011–2012	Shobha Somnath Ki	Maharani Gayatri
2012	Hum Ne Li Hai- Shapath	Vasundhara (Episode aired on 18 November 2012)
	Aaj Ki Housewife Hai... Sab Jaanti Hai	Renu Manohar Chaturvedi
2013	Na Bole Tum Na Maine Kuch Kaha 2	Naina Bhonsle
2014	Mahabharat	Devaki
2017	Peshwa Bajirao	Shiu Krishna Joshi
2019	Aghori	Suman Jaybheem Bhandari
2019–2020	Shakti - Astitva Ke Ehsaas Ki	Dr. Gayatri
2021	Maddam Sir	Shalini Shekhar
2021–2023	Meet: Badlegi Duniya Ki Reet	Sunaina Ram Ahlawat
2022–2023	Raazz Mahal	Adhiraj's mother
2023	Durga Aur Charu	Savitri Banerjee
2023	Jyoti... Umeedon Se Sajee	Supriya
2023–present	Yeh Rishta Kya Kehlata Hai	Kajal Poddar Bansal

== Films ==
- Aitraaz as Jenny, Raj’s secretary
- 36 China Town as Rosy
- Utthaan as Neha Chaudhary

== Reality Show ==
Year	Show	Role	Channel
2008	Saas v/s Bahu	Contestant	Sahara One
