= Mushtaq Shiekh =

Indian screenwriter, author, producer and actor

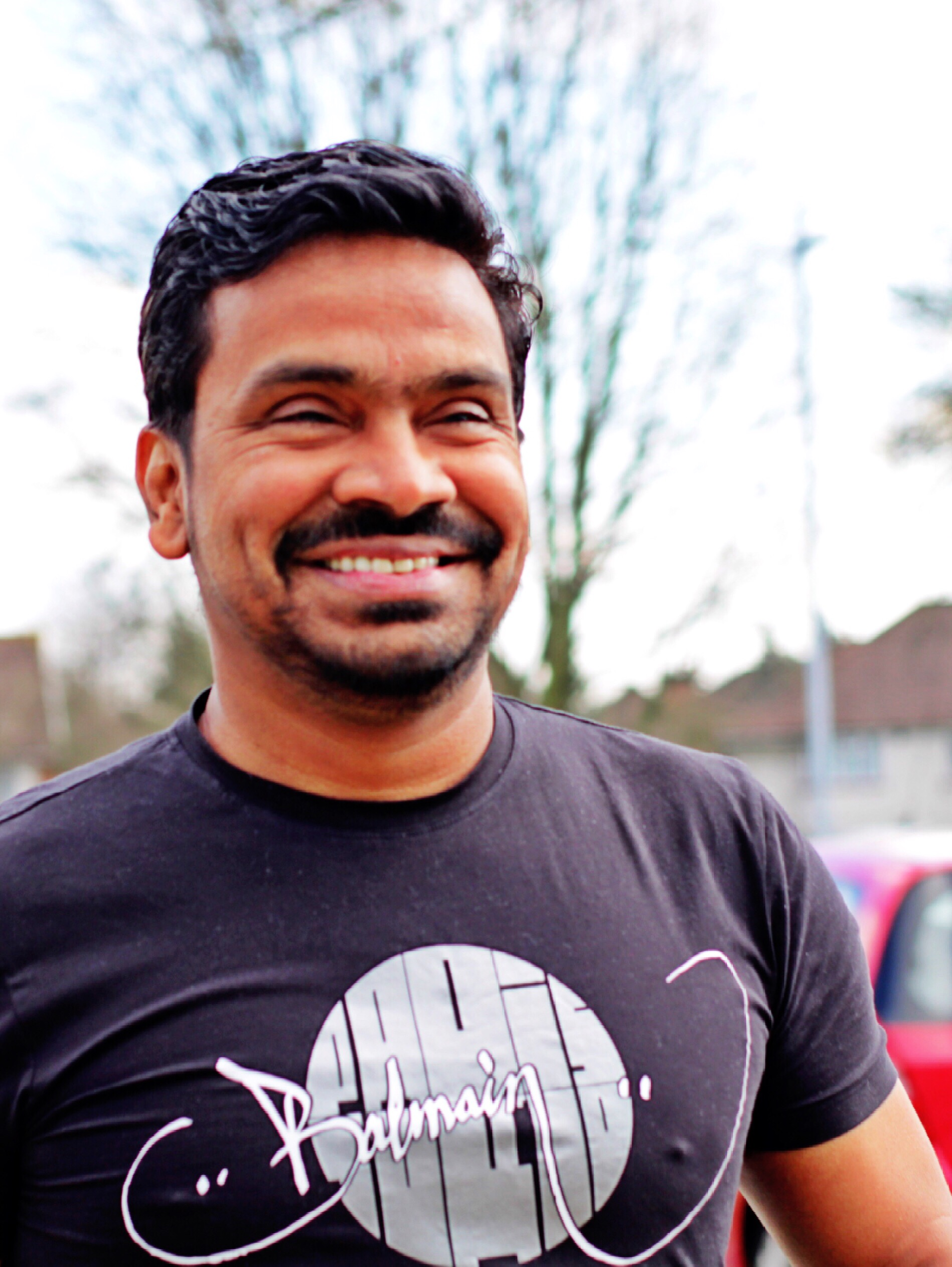
- Shiekh in 2018
- Born: Mumbai, Maharashtra, India
- Occupations: Screenwriter; Producer; Actor; Author

Mushtaq Shiekh is an Indian screenwriter, author, producer and actor. He is mainly known for writing the screenplays of Ra.One, Om Shanti Om and Billu.

== Early life ==
Shiekh was born in Mumbai, Maharashtra, India. He wrote the script for Priyadarshan's Rangrezz. He authored the biography of Indian actor Shahrukh Khan titled Still Reading Khan.

== Career ==
Shiekh has written several books about movies in India. During a visit to a book fair of Abu Dhabi, he said "I wish more books were written about movies for people who are genuinely interested in knowing how this art form is made." He worked as an associate producer in Anubhav Sinha's Mulk (2018). He has also worked with Indian TV channel Sahara One as a creative director.

Shiekh is writing a book for children titled "Blue Forest". He told reporters that the book will be released in 2019. The book tells the story of a magical forest. He is also writing a web series for Ekta Kapoor's ALTBalaji.

In year 2024, Mushtaq wrote and presented a short horror film titled Happy Ending. The film was directed by Anil Bajpai and featured Ishita Ganguly and Nalini Negi. It was released on JioCinema.

Mushtaq wrote his first fiction novel titled Secrets Within in year 2024. The book was a thriller which tells the story of an architect who was given contract to construct the mansion of a rich man but found himself trapped in mysterious circumstances once he started working on the project. A film on the book is in the process with a film studio. While speaking to Mid-day, Mushtaq reveals that Akshay Kumar, Tabbu and R.Madhavan could be considered playing the main lead in the film.

In 2025 Mushtaq Shiekh wrote Harshvardhan Rane and Sonam Bajwa starrer Ek Deewane Ki Deewaniyat. The film was directed by Milap Zaveri. The film was released in Deepawali festival with Ayushman Khurana starrer Thamma and went on to do more than 100 Crore on the Box Office worldwide. It was declared a runaway hit.

== Other work ==
Mushtaq Shiekh organised a campaign to support daily wages workers of the Indian television industry during the COVID-19 pandemic in India. Along with television producer Ekta Kapoor, filmmaker Tigmanshu Dhulia and TV actor Karan Patel and many others, a fund was created to support workers from TV industry who lost their jobs.

== Filmography ==
| Year | Film | Screenplay | Associate Producer | Actor |
|---|---|---|---|---|
| 2003 | Supari | Yes | | |
| 2007 | Om Shanti Om | Yes | | Yes |
| 2009 | Billu | Yes | | |
| 2011 | Ra.One | Yes | | Yes |
| 2013 | Rangrezz | Yes | | |
| 2013 | Warning | | Yes | |
| 2014 | Gulab Gang | | Yes | |
| 2014 | Zid | | Yes | |
| 2015 | Kyaa Kool Hain Hum 3 | Yes | | |
| 2016 | Mastizaade | Yes | | |
| 2018 | Mulq | | Yes | |
| 2024 | Happy Ending (Short Film) | Yes | | |
| 2025 | Ek Deewane Ki Deewaniyat | Yes | | |

=== Television career ===
| Year | TV Serial | Story | Screenplay | Creative Director |
|---|---|---|---|---|
| 2000 | Kahaani Ghar Ghar Kii | Yes | | |
| 2002 | Kya Hadsaa Kya Haqeeqat | Yes | Yes | |
| 2003 | Kahiin to Hoga | Yes | Yes | |
| 2004 | K. Street Pali Hill | Yes | Yes | |
| 2009 | Ganesh Leela | | | Yes |
| 2009 | Kesariya Balam Aavo Hamare Des | | | Yes |

== Books ==
| Year | Book | Refs. |
|---|---|---|
| 2001 | Asoka, the making | |
| 2002 | Devdas, The Indian Hamlet | |
| 2006 | Still Reading Khan | |
| 2007 | Shahrukh Can | |
| 2008 | The Making Of Om Shanti Om | |
| 2024 | Secrets Within | |
