= Suhasi Dhami =

Indian television actress

Suhasi Goradia Dhami
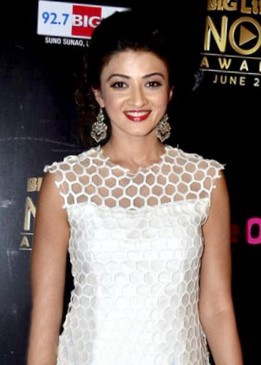
- Dhami at Big Life OK Now Awards 2014
- Born: April 28, 1988 (age 37); Mumbai, Maharashtra
- Occupations: Actress; model; dancer
- Years active: 2004–present
- Spouse: Jaisheel Dhami (m. 2007)
- Children: 1
- Relatives: Drashti Dhami (sister-in-law)

Suhasi Dhami (née Goradia) is an Indian actress and model. She is known for portraying Abha in Yahaaan Main Ghar Ghar Kheli and double role as Vedika Mathur and Vedika Pratab in Aap Ke Aa Jane Se. She appeared in KK's music video titled 'Aasman Ke".

== Early life ==
Dhami is a trained classical dancer since childhood.

== Career ==
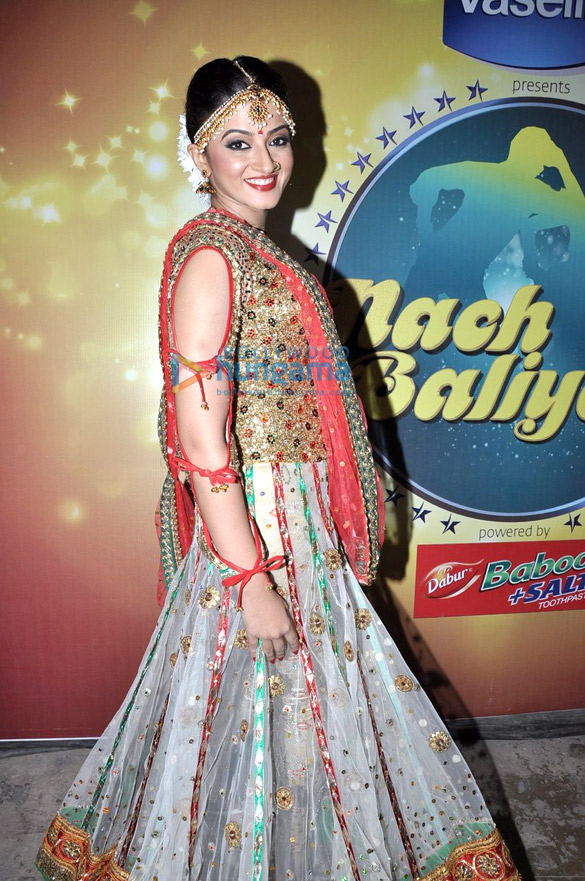
Suhasi on the sets of Nach Baliye 5 in 2012

She began her acting career in 2004 when she appeared in an episode of K. Street Pali Hill as Jugnu Khandelwaal. In 2005, she was cast in Raat Hone Ko Hai, Poorav Ya Paschim and Home Sweet Home. In 2006, she landed a role in two serials Aek Chabhi Hai Padoss Mein as the lead and Antriksh-ek Amar katha as Rajkumari Urmi. In 2009, she was cast in Yahaaan Main Ghar Ghar Kheli as Abha. After Yahaaan Main Ghar Ghar Kheli ended in July 2012, few months later, she joined Aaj Ki Housewife Hai... Sab Jaanti Hai as Sona Kanhaiyya Chaturvedi which premiered in December 2012.

In 2012, she participated as a contestant in Nach Baliye 5 alongside her husband Jaisheel Dhami, where she finished as the second runner up of the show. In June 2014, she joined the mythological series Devon Ke Dev...Mahadev on Life OK as Goddess Parvati alongside Mohit Raina. After taking a 3-year break from TV, she returned to acting in late 2017, when she landed the lead role of Vedika Mathur and Vedika Pratab on Zee TV's new show Aap Ke Aa Jane Se opposite actor Karan Jotwani. In June 2018, she featured in an episode of Piya Albela.

== Personal life ==
She is married to Jaisheel Dhami and has a son, Kabir Dhami (born. 2015). Drashti Dhami is her sister-in-law.

== Filmography ==
=== Films ===
Year	Title	Role	Language	Notes	Ref.
2008	Haage Summane	Khushi	Kannada		
2009	Vaade Kaavali	Geetha	Telugu		

=== Television ===
Year	Title	Role	Notes	Ref.
2003	Shakti	Hema		
2004	K. Street Pali Hill	Jugnu Khandelwal		
2004–2005	Kabhi Haan Kabhi Naa	Samantha "Sam"		
2005	Raat Hone Ko Hai	Seema	Segment: "Tingoo"; Episode 185 – Episode 188	
2005	Raat Hone Ko Hai	Avantika's Younger Sister	Segment: "Death Dealer"; Episode 205 – Episode 208	
2005–2006	Poorav Ya Paschim			
2005–2006	Home Sweet Home	Nikita		
2006–2007	Aek Chabhi Hai Padoss Mein	Urmila "Urmi" Mehta		
2006–2007	Antriksh - Ek Amar Katha	Rajkumari Urmi		
2009	Ssshhhh...Phir Koi Hai	Kalyani	Episode: "Vallabhgarh Ki Rajkumari: Part 1 – Part 8"	
2009	Vicky Ki Taxi	Vicky's girlfriend		
2009–2012	Yahan Main Ghar Ghar Kheli	Swarnabha Prasad / Albeli		
2011–2012	Kahani Comedy Circus Ki	Contestant		
2011	Antariksh - Ek Amar Katha	Urmi		
2012–2013	Aaj Ki Housewife Hai... Sab Jaanti Hai	Sona Chaturvedi		
2012	Ramleela – Ajay Devgn Ke Saath	Urmila		
2013	Nach Baliye 5	Contestant	2nd runner-up	
2014	Devon Ke Dev...Mahadev	Parvati		
2016	Bas Thode Se Anjane	Sambhavi Agarwal		
2018–2019	Aap Ke Aa Jane Se	Vedika Gupta Agarwal		
2019	Aap Ke Aa Jane Se	Vedika Pratab Kashyap		
2022	Swaraj	Rani Velu Nachiyar	Episode 14: "Freedom Fighter Rani Velu Nachiyar"	
2023–2024	Karmadhikari Shanidev	Devi Sandhya		
2023–2024	Karmadhikari Shanidev	Devi Chhaya		
2025	Aye Dil Jee Le Zara	Nandini		

==== Special appearance ====
Year	Title	Role	Notes	Ref.
2005	Phir Bhi Dil Hai Hindustani	Anjali	Season 2	
2018	Piyaa Albela	Dancer		
2018	Jeet Gayi Toh Piya Morey	Vedika Pratab		
2018	Kumkum Bhagya	Dancer		
2023	Aangan – Aapno Kaa	Aastha Jaydev Sharma		

== Awards and nominations ==
Year	Award	Category	Show	Result
2009	Filmfare Award	Filmfare Award for Best Actress – Kannada	Haage Summane	Nominated
2011	Zee Rishtey Awards	Favourite Beti (Favourite Daughter)	Yahan Main Ghar Ghar Kheli	Won
2018	Zee Rishtey Awards	Favourite Jodi (Favourite Couple) with Karan Jotwani	Aap Ke Aa Jane Se	Nominated
2018	Zee Rishtey Awards	Favourite Popular Character – Female	Aap Ke Aa Jane Se	Nominated
