= Ek Aastha Aisi Bhee =

- Genre: Indian soap opera
- Created by: Shoonya Square Productions
- Directed by: Dharmendra Sharma
- Starring: Tina Philip; Kanwar Dhillon
- Country of origin: India
- Original language: Hindi
- No. of episodes: 156

Production
- Producers: Dheeraj Sarna; Ved Raj Shrivastav
- Camera setup: Multi-camera
- Running time: 23 minutes

Original release
- Network: StarPlus
- Release: 3 April – 30 September 2017

Ek Aastha Aisi Bhee is an Indian Hindi television drama, produced by Shoonya Square Productions. The series starred Tina Philip and Kanwar Dhillon. It premiered on 3 April 2017 on StarPlus and aired from Monday through Saturday during the Star Plus Dopahar (afternoon) programming block. The series ended on 30 September 2017 with the discontinuation of the Star Plus Dopahar block.

== Plot ==
The series revolves around Aastha, an atheist girl from Manali, who gets married into a very religious family in Kolkata and tries to save the family from Guru Maa's ploys. Aastha's and Shiv's love is meant to be. Radhika, Shiv's ex-girlfriend comes and destroys their love by creating misunderstandings between them. Shiv wants Aastha to stop his marriage with Radhika. But Aastha thinks that if Shiv loves her he will not marry Radhika. Shiv and Aastha love each other a lot but are unable to tell each other. Radhika and Gurumas plan fails when Astha exposes Radhika through the use of a recorder. During their engagement, Astha uses technology to show how Radhika conspired against the whole family to obtain her interest. After Radhika is exposed, gurumaa says that she wants to do 'aarti' before she leaves the household to which the members retaliate. But, on Asthas convincing, the family members agree. Gurumaa gives prashad which contains sleeping pills. In the parallel scene, Radhika comes in Asthas room and holds her up against the wall with a knife. Arguments continue between Lakshmi, Gurumaa and others. Eventually, Shiv rescues Astha under the pretext of marrying Radhika. The show ends on a happy note that a person's character cannot be judged based on their religious views. An atheist person can be a good human and a religious person can be a bad human.

== Cast ==
=== Main cast ===
- Tina Philip as Aastha Shiv Agarwal: Shiv's wife
- Kanwar Dhillon as
  - Shiv Govind Agarwal: Aastha's husband
  - Om Govind Agarwal: Shiv's twin brother
- Sharanpreet Kaur as Guru Maa, also known as Sandhya Bhaumik
- Palak Pusarwani as Radhika: Guru Maa's daughter and Shiv's ex-girlfriend

=== Recurring cast ===
- Vivek Mushran as Govind Agarwal: Shiv's father
- Manasi Salvi as Lakshmi Govind Agarwal: Shiv's mother and Govind's wife
- Hemant Choudhary as Nandlal Agarwal: Shiv's uncle and Govind's younger brother
- Manisha Dave as Jaya Nandalal Agarwal: Shiv's aunt and Nandalal's wife
- Mayank Sharma as Angad Nandalal Agarwal: Nandalal and Jaya's son
- Sameeksha Sud as Janki Angad Agarwal: Angad's wife
- Anita Kulkarni as Sharda: Aastha's mother
- Nikhil Sharma as Ashok: Aastha's brother
- Vaani Sharma as Gayatri Govind Agarwal
- Abhinav Kapoor as Balwan Agarwal: Shiv's brother; Balwan is the adopted son of the Agarwal family.
- Ambika Soni as Runjhun Balwan Agarwal: Balwan's wife and Aastha's sister
- Rashi Khanna as Aastha
- Tottempudi Gopichand
- Ahmad Harhash as Billo Rani

== Production ==
=== Development ===
Initially titled as Nastik while in pre-production, the title Ek Aastha Aisi Bhee was finalized then.

This was one of the four dramas which was launched on 3 April 2017 during afternoon band of Star Plus Dopahar Block, reviving Star Plus' afternoon new programming after years.

In May 2017, while the leads Tina Philip and Kanwar Dhillon were shooting for a sequence in a lake of Film City, Philip drowned while Dhillon saved her.

A fire broke out on 9 August 2017 which destroyed parts of the sets, but no one was hurt. The series will be featured in Starlife as Prayers of love.

=== Casting ===
Tina Philip and Kanwar Dhillon were cast as the leads. Besides Sharanpreet Kaur, Manasi Salvi, Pallavi Rao, Anita Kulkarni, Palak Purswani, Lilly Patel, Supriya Sarna, Vivek Mushran, Abhinav Kapoor, Hemant Choudhary, Manisha Dave, Mayank Sharma, Samiksha Sud, Nikhil Sharma, Vaani Sharma and Ambika Soni were cast then.

=== Filming ===
Although set in Kolkata, the series is filmed at the sets created in Mumbai at Film City, Goregaon. Some earlier episodes were shot in Kolkata and Manali.

=== Cancellation ===
With the serials in the afternoon block not being able to garner the expected numbers in its ratings, the channel shut the show on September 30, 2017.
