= K. Street Pali Hill =

Indian thriller television series

- Intertitle
- Created by: Balaji Telefilms
- Screenplay by: Mushtaq Shiekh; Anil Pandey; Samidha-Khalid; Jainesh Ejardar; Archana Joshi; Dialogues; Archana Joshi
- Directed by: Garry Bhinder; Prasad Govandi; Kamal Monga Manesh Om Singhania
- Creative director: Sandiip Sikcand Nivedita Basu
- Starring: See Below
- Opening theme: "K. Street Pali Hill" by Viju Shah
- Country of origin: India
- Original language: Hindi
- No. of episodes: Total 428

Production
- Producers: Ekta Kapoor & Shobha Kapoor
- Cinematography: Sadanand Pillai
- Running time: 24 minutes

Original release
- Network: StarPlus
- Release: 27 September 2004 – 12 October 2006

K. Street Pali Hill is an Indian thriller soap that aired on StarPlus. It replaced another thriller, Kaahin Kissii Roz, when it concluded in 2004. K. Street Pali Hill was successful for about a year, before its popularity plummeted, owing to many of the actors being replaced. This show shared many similarities with DD National's popular daily soap Shanti.

== Overview ==
K. Street Pali Hill is the address of one of Mumbai's most affluent families. Three friends share the same address. Money, power, fame, success - there's nothing that they do not have. They share everything including a secret, a secret so dark that it is casting shadows on their future.

Bikram Kaul, Aditya Khandelwal, and Arindam Keshab are among India's leading business figures. They live together in a large mansion with their families. The families share a close relationship, and their children get along well. However, an old outhouse on the property holds a secret known only to the three friends. It is closely connected to their success, and its past remains hidden. The secret has remained undisturbed until now.

== Plot ==
Part One
Arindam Keshav, Aditya Khandelwal and Bikram Kaul are three wealthy businessmen who have been close friends for twenty years. They share a secret that can destroy their lives. Their families live in the huge K-Mansion on K Street, Pali Hill. They keep the secret buried in the old outhouse behind the mansion and never unlock it. Smriti enters the K Mansion as an interior decorator and bonds with the family members. Unusual haunting incidents begins to happen with everyone in the house. Somebody tries to create a rift among these three pals. Smriti is revealed to be the one behind all this. Her intention is to find out who among the three men is her father. Her mother, Meenakshi Gupta was raped by one of these friends. She tries all the possible ways to find out the culprit. The three friends feel disturbed about their secret being leaked. They check the outhouse where the rape happened but find nothing that can unveil their secret. Smriti tries to check out samples taken from the three friends, including hair samples, smoke samples and blood samples. Finally she discovers that Bikram is her father. Bikram reveals his secret story. He confesses that he raped Smriti's mother who used to be very loyal to his company and was a very innocent lady. After the secret is revealed, Bikram's wife Misha turns against him and expels him from the mansion. Smriti brings her mother to the mansion, but Bikram kills her in anger. Bikram calls his sister Gayatri Kaul a.k.a. GK and asks for her help. Gayatri enters K Mansion and starts plotting against the members of the household.

Part Two
Drone Keshab, Arindam's eldest son, falls in love with Smriti. She does not reciprocate at first but later admits her attraction, and they decide to get married. Gayatri sends Drone out of K mansion for some business, and behind his back, she started instigating Aditya's wife Ishita to get her son Raunaq married with Smriti. Deboshree, Drone's mother, feels that Drone and Smriti must get married Meanwhile, Raunaq (Alok Arora) falls in love with Smriti, but she only considers him a friend. When Raunaq learns about Drone and Smriti, he feels jealous but accepts this truth. Preparations for Drone and Smriti's marriage start but unusual incidents start happening with her. Someone sends a card to Smriti; the card contains a drawing in blood, a knife and a word "SURPRISE". From that day, knives start appearing around her, sometimes in her bedroom, sometimes as a delivered gift, sometimes inside her purse. This creates a rift between Drone and Smriti, so they separate. After their breakup, Ishita picks up the topic of Smriti's marriage with Raunaq. Drone is beside himself when he hears about Smriti and Raunaq's upcoming marriage. He tries to convince Smriti that she did not understand what had really happened between them. But Smriti accepts Raunaq's proposal and marries him. Raunaq is then revealed to be the one behind all the threatening incidents as he is obsessively in love with Smriti and wanted to break up her relationship with Drone. Gayatri helps Raunaq in his plans because she wants to destroy Smriti. Drone, still in love with Smriti, marries Bikram's and Misha's daughter, Dweep Kaul. Smriti finds the SURPRISE posters in her husband Raunaq's wardrobe and realizes the truth. She breaks off all relations with Raunaq, though she does not break their marriage, as she does not want to hurt the other family members.

Part Three
Raunaq gets into a car accident and is badly wounded. He needs B− blood group for his operation to be successful. Arindam's blood matches with Raunaq's blood and he saves Raunaq's life. Gayatri and Bikram find out that Ishita and Arindam had an affair twenty years ago, and Raunaq is not Aditya's son but Arindam's. They expose this secret to everyone and it creates a rift between Arindam and Aditya as also Deboshree and Ishita. Arindam tries to make Aditya understand that he did not do it on purpose. Twenty years ago he loved Ishita but sacrificed his love for his friend Aditya who was also in love with her. Aditya refuses to listen to any of this and breaks off all relations with Arindam. Raunaq recovers and starts to mistreat Ishita and Arindam. Everyone quarrels with each other and the entire family disperses. Smriti tries her best to solve the problem and reunite the family. She also starts to forgive her husband Raunaq for his past misdeeds with her, and keeps an eye on Bikram and Gayatri to learn their next move.

Part Four
One day, Bikram and Gayatri start acting suspicious and leave. Smriti starts following their car. Gayatri and Bikram have planned this to lure Smriti and get her killed. They bribe a hit man to crash into Smriti's car with a truck. The car falls off the cliff and explodes. However, Smriti is saved by Dr. Vansh and he gives her a new face via plastic surgery as her face was burned badly in the accident. As the days pass, she hooks up with him and bonds with his sister, Netra, a fashion designer. Smriti then remembers how Gayatri and Bikram had tried to kill her and decides to take revenge. She changes her name to Simran and enters K Mansion, which is in chaos. She is stunned to come face to face with a woman having her original face and living in the mansion as Raunak's wife Smriti. Aditya drinks excessively and usually fights with Ishita as he still hasn't forgiven her for her infidelity. Arindam and Deboshree are unhappy with each other. Misha was declared dead but later it was revealed that Bikram and Gayatri turned her mental by giving her pills and was admitted to mental asylum. Through the help of Netra, Simran approached Misha and discharged her from the asylum and Vansh helped Misha in recovery. Simran investigates and finds out that the fake Smriti is actually a woman named Anju. Gayatri has found her somewhere and trained her to act as Smriti to get all the K Mansion property for herself. Soon Anju and Simran form an alliance and sort out all the disputes of Arindum, Aditya, Ishita and Deboshree. Simran and Anju creates a rift between Bikram and Gayatri, later Bikram kidnapped Gayatri and dishonestly blames Gayatri's murder on Simran. Advocate Arya helped Simran escape this situation by revealing that she is actually Smriti and Gayatri went against Bikram which sentenced him to jail. Anju and Raunaq decide to get married. Drone, by now, has started to love his wife Dweep. Smriti a.k.a. Simran marries Dr. Vansh, but he dies soon after in a tragic mishap. Heartbroken, Simran/ Smriti learns that his death was no accident but was caused by someone in K-Mansion. She wages a long war to find her husband's killer and eventually discovers that it is none other than Raunaq, who is still obsessed with her. She has a hard time convincing Anju about this. Simran finally settles down with a good friend of hers, a lawyer named Arya Kapoor, who has supported her throughout her struggle.

Gayatri kidnaps Dweep. She calls Anju and directs her to bring the property transfer papers. Anju arrives at Gayatri's hideout and gives her the property papers. Gayatri tries to kill Anju but police arrives on the scene and arrests her. The court announces its verdict: Gayatri gets life-imprisonment, Bikram gets six month imprisonment and Raunak is relieved for testifying against them. Raunaq requests Anju to forgive him for all his misdeeds and give him a last chance. Finally, Anju forgives him and they lived happily thereafter with others in K Mansion.

== Characters ==
- Vikram Kapadia as Bikram Kaul
- Ashwini Kalsekar as Misha Kaul (Bikram's wife)
- Sudha Chandran as Gayatri Kaul a.k.a. GK (Bikram's elder sister)
- Jasveer Kaur as Smriti Gupta (Bikram Kaul's illegitimate daughter) (before surgery) / Sunaina
- Riva Bubber as Smriti (after surgery) / Shaina / Mansi Mittal / Damini Virani Reborn
- Vipul Gupta / Vikas Sethi as Drone Keshab (Arindum and Deboshree's elder son, Dweep's husband)
- Nisha Sareen as Dweep Kaul Keshav (Bikram and Misha's daughter, Drone's wife)
- Rituraj Singh as Aditya Khandelwal
- Iravati Harshe / Vaishnavi Mahant as Ishita Khandelwal (Aditya's wife)
- Alok Arora as Raunak Khandelwal (Aditya and Ishita's son)
- Suhasi Goradia Dhami as Jugnu Khandelwal (Aditya and Ishita's daughter)
- Alyy Khan/ Mukul Dev as Arindam Keshav
- Nivedita Bhattacharya as Deboshree Arindam Keshav (Arindam's wife)
- Vijay Balhara as Bhim Keshav (Arindam and Deboshree's second son)
- Ajay Balhara as Shyam Keshav (Arindam and Deboshree's second son)(Bhim and Mahim both are surgery twins)
- Divya Jagdale as Meenakshi Gupta (Smriti's mother, Meenakshi was raped by Bikram Kaul resulting in Smriti's birth)
- Preeti Puri as Janvi (Smriti Simran's best friend) Anju Fake Smriti
- Kali Prasad Mukherjee as Jaisingh (K mansion's head servant)
- Siddharth Vasudev as Arya Kapoor
- Sachin Sharma as Dr. Vansh, plastic surgeon
- Kunika as Ketaki Kumar, Gayatri's friend
- Aashish Kaul as Advocate Satlani
- Manish Khanna as Advocate
- Rocky Verma as Crime Branch Officer

== Production ==
During the launch episode, the lead characters Kashish and Sujal from Kahiin To Hoga made a guest appearance. On 12 July 2005, the series had a crossover with Kahiin.
