= Manmohan Tiwari =

Indian television actor

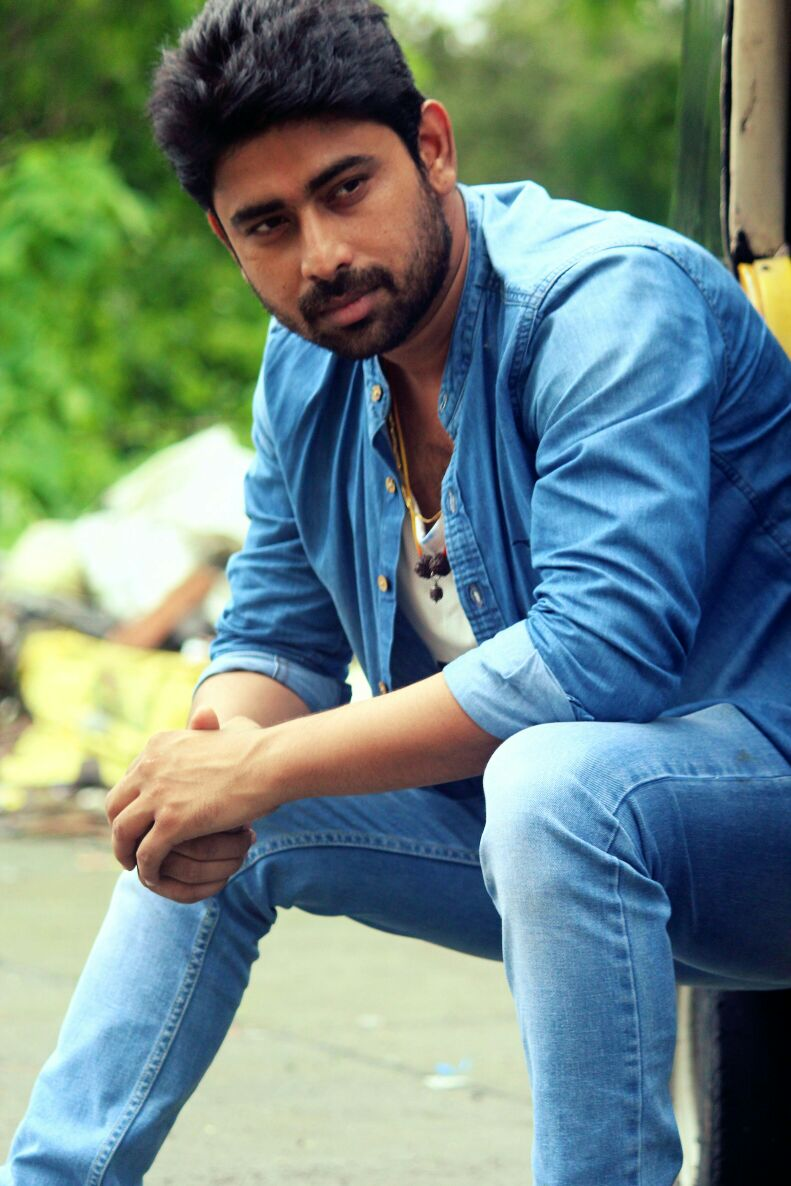
- Born: 20 January 1984 (age 42); Rishikesh, Uttarakhand, India
- Occupations: Actor, Host
- Years active: 2009–present
- Known for: Hum Hain Na, Jaana Na Dil Se Door and Kumkum Bhagya
- Spouse: Sneha Tiwari
- Children: Rudransh Tiwari Tvarita Tiwari

Manmohan Tiwari (born 20 January 1984) is an Indian television and film actor and host.

He debuted with the show Jamunia but gained recognition from the television show Mann Kee Awaaz Pratigya (2011–12) and Hum Hain Na (2014). Apart from this Manmohan has acted in multiple television series, including Arakshan (2011), Honge Juda Na Hum (2013), Anamika (2013), Pavitra Bandhan (2013), Police Factory (2015), and Jana Na Dil Se Door (2016).

Manmohan was also one of the four finalists in the first of its kind reality show Rakhi Ka Swayamwar. He has hosted travel series like Namah Shivay on Anandam and 7th & 8th Aadhi Abadi Award Show.

He made his debut in Bollywood with the film Awesome Mausam and has worked in five Bhojpuri films. As of 2019, he is seen as Rohit in Balaji Telefilms's hugely popular fiction drama Kumkum Bhagya on ZEE TV.

== Personal life and family ==
Manmohan Tiwari was born on 20 January 1984 in Rishikesh. He did his schooling from Saraswati Shishu Mandir. He completed his graduation from PG College Rishikesh. He further completed his LLB from Gadwal University. He got married in 2015 to an IT Professional Sneha Tiwari.

== Filmography ==
=== Films ===
Key
†	Denotes films that have not yet been released

Year	Film	Role	Language	Notes
2016	Awesome Mausam	Arjun	Hindi	
2013	Rani Chali Sasural	Raja	Bhojpuri	
2013	Sapoot	Arjun	Bhojpuri	
2016	Real Indian Mother		Bhojpuri	
	E Kaisan Duniyadari (Unreleased)		Bhojpuri	

=== Fiction shows ===
Key
†	Denotes shows that have not yet been broadcast

Year	Show	Role	Ref(s)
2009	Rakhi Ka Swayamwar (Reality Show)	As Self	
2010	Jamunia	Awadh Thakur	
2011–2012	Armano ka Balindan Aarakshan	Arvind Thakur	
2011–2012	Mann Kee Awaaz Pratigya	Radhe	
2013	Hongey Judaa Na Hum	Badri Mishra	
2013	Anamika	Abhay Pratap Singh	
2013	Pavitra Bandhan	RajKumar	
2013	Hum Hain Na	Papu Singh	
2015	Police Factory	Reporter	
2016	Jana Na Dil Se Door	Vipul	
2019–2021	Kumkum Bhagya	Rohit "Sanju" Gill	
2019	Vidya (TV series)	Ram Singh	
2019–2021	Gudiya Hamari Sabhi Pe Bhari	Pappu	
2022	Jai Bharati	jay	
2023	Shravani	Viren	
2024	Mishri	Shakti	

=== Non-fiction and reality shows ===
Year	Show	Role
2015	Namah Shivay (Travel Series)	Host
2015	7th Aadhi Abadi Award	Anchor
2015	8th Aadhi Abadi Award	Anchor
2011–present	Savdhan India	Episodic
2012–present	Crime Patrol	Episodic
2012–present	Crime Alert	Episodic
