= Priyansh Jora =

Indian actor

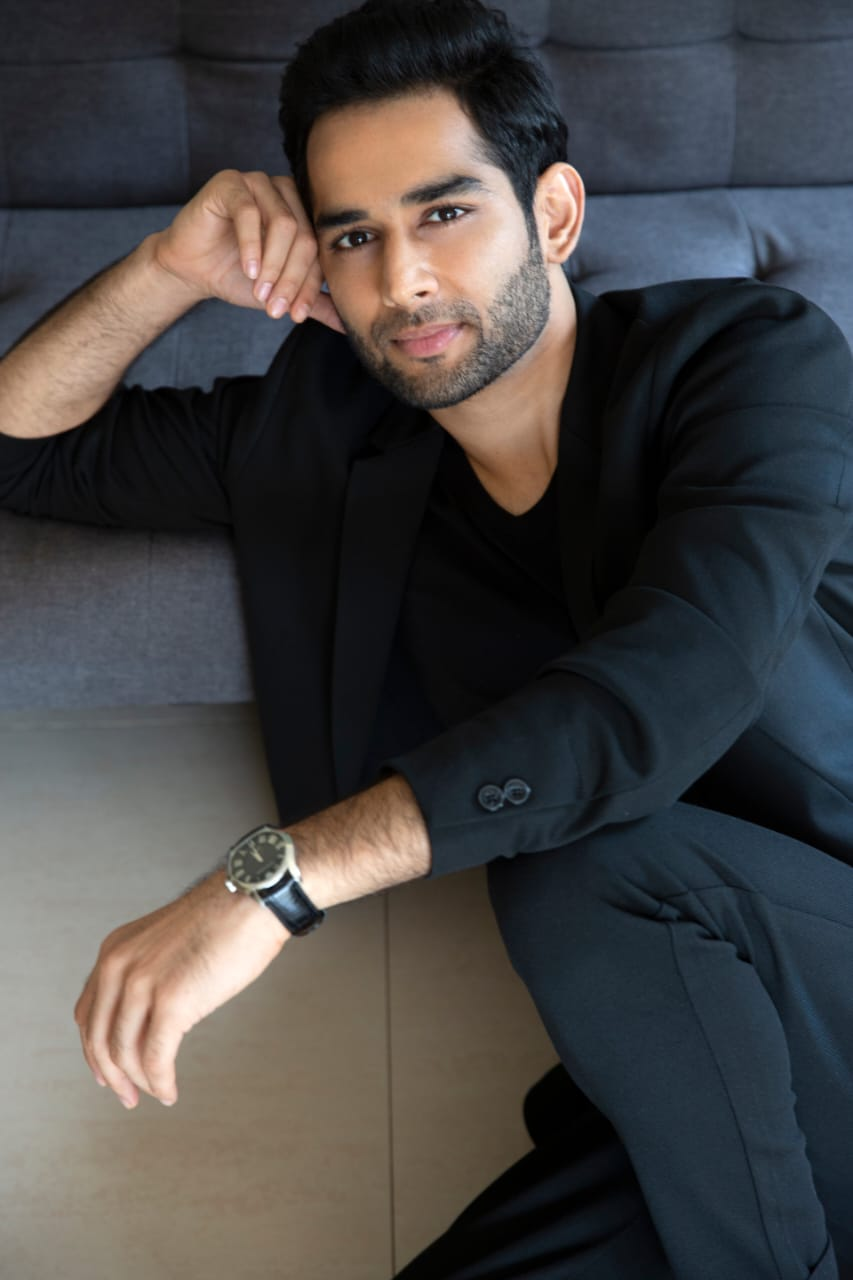
- Born: 13 November 1990 (age 35)
- Occupation: Actor

Priyansh Jora (born 13 November 1990) is an actor who has worked in Indian films, web series, and television shows. He is known for his portrayal of lead character Titu in 2014 comedy-drama soap opera Tu Mera Hero which premiered on 22 December 2014 on Star Plus. Priyansh Jora made his film debut with the movie Khandaani Shafakhana. Released in 2019, "Khandaani Shafakhana" is a comedy-drama film directed by debutant Shilpi Dasgupta, and starring Sonakshi Sinha, Varun Sharma and Badshah.

In 2023, Priyansh Jora portrayed a character called "Vinayak Prabhu" in the Netflix television series called Kaala Paani.

== Career ==
Jora started his career, by being cast as Rohit for 24, an Indian Hindi-language action thriller television series starring Anil Kapoor that aired on Colors TV. Later he played the lead in the TV serial Tu Mera Hero aired on Star Plus. He also played lead in the TV serial Bade Bhaiyya Ki Dulhania, an Indian Hindi comedy-drama series aired on Sony TV and Sony TV Asia from 18 July 2016 to 7 October 2016. In 2018, Jora played the lead in the web series Truth or Tamanna, which was streamed on Voot as a mini series. The same year he hosted dance reality show High Fever - Dance Ka Naya Tevar on &tv, also featuring Lara Dutta, Ahmed Khan and Esha Gupta.

In 2019, Jora made his film debut with the film Khandaani Shafakhana, starring Sonakshi Sinha. As of 3 August 2019, with a gross of ₹3.27 crore in India and ₹0.71 crore overseas, the film has a worldwide gross collection of ₹39.8 million.

== Awards ==
Jora was awarded Sabse Mazedaar Sadasya for his role as "Titu" in Tu Mera Hero at Star Parivaar Award in 2015.

He was also awarded Fresh New Face (Actor) at Indian Telly Awards in 2015, for his role as "Titu" in Tu Mera Hero.

== Filmography ==
=== Television ===
Year	Title	Role	Ref
2011	Super Stud	Priyansh/Himself	
2013	24	Rohit	
2014- 2015	Tu Mera Hero	Ashish Agarwal - Titu	
2016	Bade Bhaiya Ki Dulhania	Abhisek Pant	
2018	High Fever -Dance ka Naya Tevar	Himself, Host	
2018	Truth or Tamanna	Dhruv	
2023	Kaala Paani	Vinayak Prabhu/Veenu	

=== Films ===
Year	Title	Role	Ref
2019	Khandaani Shafakhana	Lemon Hero	
2019	Roam Rome Mein		
2022	Ittu Si Baat	Vicky	
