= Sonia Balani =

Indian actress

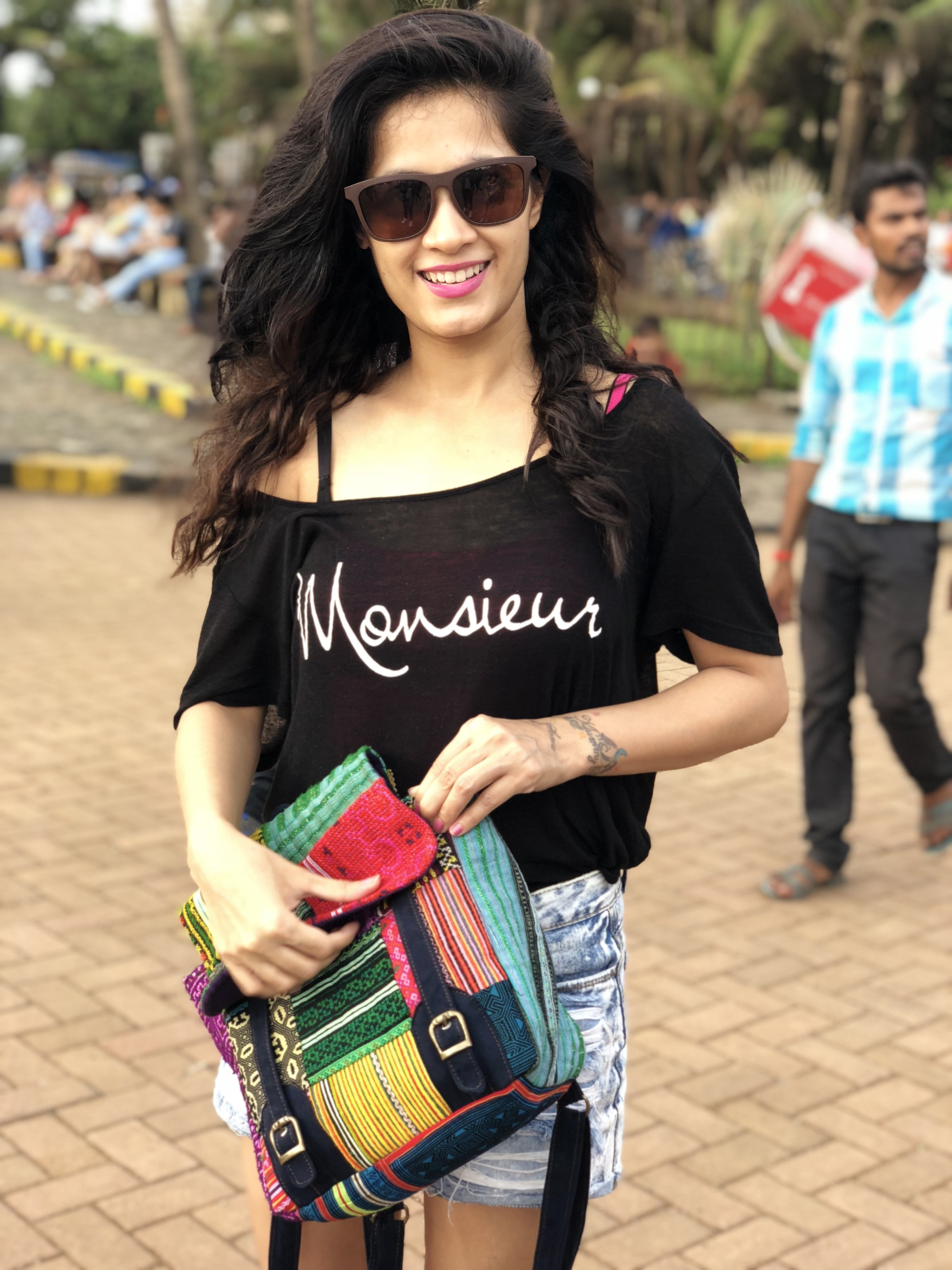
- Balani in 2018
- Born: Sonia Balani; Agra, Uttar Pradesh, India
- Education: St. John's College, Agra
- Occupation: Actress
- Years active: 2012–present

Sonia Balani is an Indian actress known for her work in movies like The Kerala Story, Baazaar, and Tum Bin 2, as well as in TV shows such as Tu Mera Hero and Bade Achhe Lagte Hain.

== Early life ==
Balani was born in a Sindhi family from Agra, Uttar Pradesh. She graduated from St. John's College, Agra.

== Career ==
She played the role of Asifa Ba in the movie The Kerala Story in 2023. She is now slated to play the role of Urmila in the upcoming film, Ramayana Part 1, set to be released in 2026.

== Filmography ==
=== Films ===
Year	Title	Role	Notes	Ref.
2016	Tum Bin 2	Gurpreet Kaur	Debut film	
2018	Baazaar	Amna Ahmed		
2023	The Kerala Story	Asifa Ba		
2026	Ramayana: Part 1	Urmila		

=== Television ===
Year	Title	Role	Notes	TV Channel	Ref.
2012–2013	Suvreen Guggal – Topper of The Year	Soni Chaddha		Channel V India	
2014	Bade Achhe Lagte Hain	Peehu Kapoor Shergil		Sony	
2014–2015	Tu Mera Hero	Panchi Agrawal	Lead	Star Plus	
2017	Detective Didi	Detective Bunty Sharma	Lead	Zee TV	
2018	Kaun Hai?	Sonika	Episode 8, 9	Colors TV	

=== Web series ===
Year	Title	Role	Platform	Ref.
2021	Bhopal to Vegas	Reshmi	Disney+ Hotstar	
2021	Glitter	Riddhi	ZEE5	

=== Theatre ===
Year	Title	Role	Notes	Ref.
2024	Sifar	Inayat Shaban	Shabd Theatre Group	
