= Pratyusha Banerjee =

Indian actress (1991–2016)

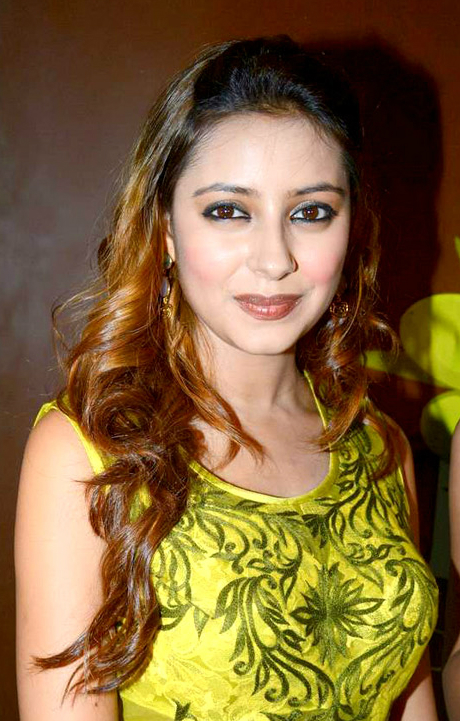
- Banerjee in 2014
- Born: 10 August 1991; Jamshedpur, Bihar (present-day Jharkhand), India
- Died: 1 April 2016 (aged 24); Mumbai, Maharashtra, India
- Occupation: Actress
- Years active: 2010–2016
- Known for: Balika Vadhu; Bigg Boss 7; Hum Hain Na; Jhalak Dikhhla Jaa 5

Pratyusha Banerjee (10 August 1991 — 1 April 2016) was an Indian television actress. She had appeared in numerous television and reality shows. Banerjee first gained recognition in 2010 with Balika Vadhu. This was her first leading role in the television series where she earned her household name "Anandi". She had participated in the reality show Bigg Boss 7 (2013).

== Career ==
She started her career with a supporting role in the show Rakt Sambandh which was followed by playing the role of Vaani (best friend of Akshara played by Hina Khan) in Yeh Rishta Kya Kehlata Hai on Star Plus.

She was selected for the lead role in 2010 Indian television series Balika Vadhu as an adult version of Anandi, replacing Avika Gor. According to the actress, she was chosen via a talent hunt, surpassing the contestants Nivedita Tiwari from Lucknow and Ketaki Chitale from Mumbai. Following the success of the show Banerjee participated in Jhalak Dikhhla Jaa (season 5). However, she left the dance show, stating that she was not comfortable during the dance rehearsals.

In 2013, she was one of the most competitive contestants in the seventh season of the show Bigg Boss. She appeared in Power Couple, along with her partner Rahul Raj Singh. Banerjee had played vital roles in Hum Hain Na, Sasural Simar Ka and Gulmohar Grand.

Her most notable work was in the serial Balika Vadhu and she was popularly known as Anandi.

== Personal life ==
Pratyusha was born in a Bengali family in Jamshedpur city of Jharkhand to Shankar and Soma Banerjee. Her father is a known social worker and runs their own NGO. In 2010, she left Jamshedpur to work in Mumbai.

== Death ==
On 1 April 2016, Banerjee was found dead by hanging in her Mumbai apartment at the age of 24. According to the postmortem report the cause of death was asphyxia.

However her parents allege she was murdered by her boyfriend, actor-producer Rahul Raj Singh, and passed off as suicide. They have pressed charges against him. In 2018, Rahul Raj Singh filed an application before the Dindoshi sessions court in Mumbai, requesting to be discharged from the case. Passing the blame on the late TV actress' parents, Rahul in the application says that her parents had taken heavy loans in her name and the actress being unable to pay her debts was frustrated and hence took the huge step. In September 2026, the Bombay High Court discharged Singh from the case, holding that the evidence was insufficient to proceed with a trial for abetment of suicide. Singh had denied the allegations against him.

== Television ==
Year(s)	Show	Role	Notes
2010	Rakt Sambandh	Priya Jagirdar	
2010	Yeh Rishta Kya Kehlata Hai	Vaani	
2010-2013	Balika Vadhu	Anandi Jagdish Singh/ Anandi Shivraj Shekhar	Lead role
2011	Kitchen Champion Season 4	Guest	
2012	Jhalak Dikhhla Jaa 5	Contestant	
2013	Bigg Boss 7	Contestant	
2014	Pyaar Tune Kya Kiya		Episodic role
2014	Savdhaan India	Host	
2014–15	Hum Hain Na	Sagarika Mishra	Lead role
2014	Kaun Banega Crorepati 8	Guest	
2015	Killerr Karaoke Atka Toh Latkah	Guest	
2015	Itna Karo Na Mujhe Pyaar	Guest	
2015	Comedy Classes	Balika Sidhu	Comic role
2015	Gulmohar Grand	Parinda Pathak	Special appearance
2015	Sasural Simar Ka	Mohini	Antagonist
2015	Swaragini – Jodein Rishton Ke Sur	Guest (as Mohini)	
2015	Kumkum Bhagya	Guest	
2015	Aahat		Episodic role
2015	Bad Company	Guest	
2015	Power Couple	Contestant	
2016	Adhuri Kahaani Hamari	Naagin	Protagonist
2016	Yeh Vaada Raha	Guest	

== Awards ==
Year	Award	Category	Show	Result
2010	Indian Telly Awards	Best Fresh New Face – Female	Balika Vadhu	Nominated
2012	Indian Telly Awards	Best Actress in a Lead Role	Balika Vadhu	
2012	Indian Telly Awards	Best Television Personality	Balika Vadhu	
2012	Indian Telly Awards	Best Onscreen Couple	Balika Vadhu	
2012	People's Choice Awards India	Favourite Drama Actress	Balika Vadhu	
2012	People's Choice Awards India	Most Good-Looking Onscreen Jodi	Balika Vadhu	
2012	BIG Star Entertainment Awards	BIG Star Most Entertaining Television Actor – Female	Balika Vadhu	Won

== See also ==
- List of Indian television actresses
