= Anshul Rajendra Garg =

Indian music producer

- Born: Dholpur, Rajasthan, India
- Education: BBA from Indian Institute of Planning and Management (IIPM)
- Occupation: Music producer

Anshul Rajendra Garg is an Indian music producer and the founder of Desi Music Factory (DMF) and Play Desi Music Factory (PlayDMF).

In 2024, Garg was awarded the Best Producer award for his song Guli Mata in the Non-Film Song category at the Iconic Gold Awards.

== Early life and career ==
Garg was born on May 8, 1992, in Dholpur, Rajasthan. He completed his BBA from the Indian Institute of Planning and Management in Delhi.

Before entering the music industry, Garg operated Kinbuck 2, a restaurant in Delhi that he established in 2015. He crossed path with pop singer and Neha Kakkar's brother, Tony Kakkar, at an event, which led to the inception of Desi Music Factory (DMF), a record label which he co-founded with Tony in 2016. Their debut track was Akhiyaan, featuring Neha Kakkar, Tony Kakkar, and Bohemia.

In 2020, Garg launched another record label, PlayDMF. Some of the notable songs recorded under this label included Bolero, Judaiyaan, and Baarish Aayi Hai. Garg made his debut in Bollywood film music through PlayDMF. In 2023, film production company Dharma Productions collaborated with Garg for the songs of the 2023 action comedy drama film, Selfiee, which starred Akshay Kumar and Emraan Hashmi in lead roles.

In 2024, he released several hit songs, including two international collaborations: Guli Mata with Shreya Ghoshal and Moroccan singer Saad Lamjarred, and Yimmy Yimmy with Shreya and French singer Tayc. In February, Anshul teamed up with Bigg Boss 17 winner Munawar Faruqui and Hina Khan for a new single titled Halki Halki Si. In April, he launched the single Dhup Lagdi starring Shehnaaz Gill and Sunny Singh. Prior to this, Anshul had signed Shehnaaz for the video song Shona Shona, that also featured the late actor Siddharth Shukla. The song was sung by Neha Kakkar and Tony Kakkar.

== Discography ==
=== As a record producer ===
Year	Song	Language	Singer(s)	Features	Ref.
2019	"Dheeme Dheeme"	Hindi			
2019	"Kanta Bai"	Punjabi			
2020	"Goa Beach"	Punjabi			
2020	"Manjha"	Punjabi			
2020	"Aeroplane"	Punjabi			
2020	"Ringtone"	Punjabi			
2020	"Dil Ko Karaar"	Punjabi			
2021	"Coffee"	Hindi			
2021	"Kanta Laga"	Punjabi			
2021	"Do Gallan"	Punjabi			
2022	"Mud Mud Ke"	Hindi			
2022	"Main Roya"	Punjabi			
2022	"Halki Si Barsaat"	Punjabi			
2023	"Kuch Itne Haseen"	Hindi			
2023	"Tanveer Evan"	Hindi			
2023	"Bolero feat."	Hindi			
2023	"Aidan Na Nach"	Hindi			
2024	"Saanware"	Hindi			
2025	"BESOS"	Hindi	Shreya Ghoshal, Karl Wine	Shikhar Dhawan, Jacqueline Fernandez	
2026	"Sharab"	Hindi	Himesh Reshammiya	Himesh Reshammiya, Manushi Chillar	

== Awards ==
- 2022: 35 Under 35 list by Entrepreneur Magazine.
- 2024: Best Producer award for the song Guli Mata in the Non-Film Song category
