= Brijmohan =

Brijmohan is a given name. Notable people with the name include:

- Brijmohan Agrawal (born 1959), Indian politician
- Brijmohan Lall Munjal (1923–2015), Indian entrepreneur
