= Nivedita Basu =

Indian television producer

- निवेदिता बासु
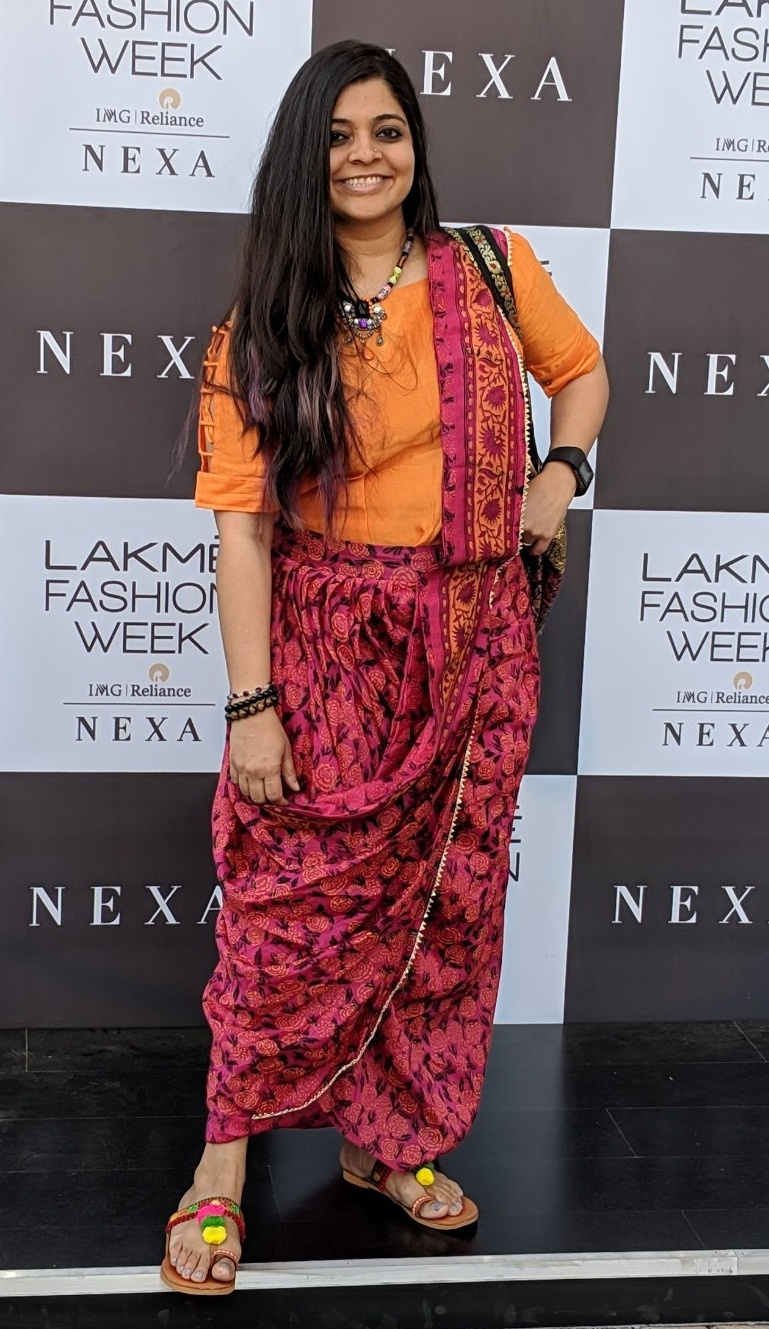
- Basu at Lakme Fashion Week
- Born: Nivedita Basu; 4 May 1978 (age 48); New Delhi, India
- Education: Masters in Mass Communication
- Alma mater: Symbiosis International University
- Occupation: Director, Creative Director, Writer, Content Creator and Producer
- Years active: 2000-present
- Organization(s): Balaji Telefilms, Atrangii
- Known for: Creative direction and film production
- Notable work: 24 (Indian TV series)
- Spouse: Yadunath Bhargavan (m. 2007)
- Children: Oyshee, Illisha; (daughters)
- Parents: Prateek Basu (father); Rita Basu (mother)
- Relatives: Sonali Basu Tyagi (sister)
- Website: https://niveditabasu.com/

Nivedita Basu is an Indian television producer, director, and creative leader who served as the vice president of content and business alliances at Atrangii, Ullu and Hari Om. Previously she was the creative director at Balaji Telefilms. Nivedita turned producer in 2015 and owns a celebrity cricket team (Kolkata Baabu Moshayes) on the television reality show Box Cricket League.

== Early life ==
Basu was born in New Delhi. Her father, Prateek Basu was an ex-Army officer and mother Rita Basu is a national-level Table Tennis and handball player. She has an elder sister, Sonali Basu Tyagi.

== Personal life ==
She married lawyer Yadunath Bhargavan Karimbil on 11 November 2007 in Kerala, India. They have two daughters, Oyshee and Illisha.

== Career ==
Basu joined Balaji Telefilms in 2000. By 2004, she was a deputy creative director, and she became Ekta Kapoor's second, determining the fates of the characters of soaps Kasautii Zindagii Kay and Kyunki Saas Bhi Kabhi Bahu Thi. She also worked on the series Hum Paanch, Kahaani Ghar Ghar Ki, Kavyanjali, Kkusum, Kyaa Hoga Nimmo Kaa, Kutumb, Kasturi Kahiin to Hoga, Karam Apnaa Apnaa, Kasamh Se, Kabhii Sautan Kabhii Saheli, Kohi Apna Sa, Kesar, Tujh Sang Preet Lagai Sajna, Kaahin Kissii Roz, Kahi To Milenge, Kya Hadsaa Kya Haqeeqat, K. Street Pali Hill, Kis Desh Mein Hai Meraa Dil, Kammal, Khwaish and many others.

Basu quit Balaji in January 2009 as a part of that production house's restructuring efforts. She joined Colosceum Media as vice president for scripted programming.

Basu also worked as a Creative Director on 24, a 24-episode series in Hindi, which is the Indian version of the American TV series of the same name. She then worked as a Creative Director on The Bachelorette India - Mere Khayalon Ki Mallika, the Indian version of the hit series The Bachelorette.

In 2015, Basu established her own production house named House of Originals and has produced few new shows for prime TV channels. She also launched her celebrity cricket team Kolkata Baabu Moshayes.

In 2015, Basu had signed Amrita Rao and Deepti Naval for her TV series titled Meri Awaaz Hi Pehchaan Hai. In 2018, Basu started an NGO, Pehla Kadam For Girl Child Welfare.

In 2021, Basu appointed as head of content and acquisition of biggbang amusement and In March 2022, she joined Atrangii - Dekhte Raho Hindi GEC and OTT as the head of content strategy and business alliances, along with her roles at Ullu and Hari Om, and she is set to resign in October 2024.

== Filmography ==
Year	Serials	Designation	Remarks
1995-2006	Hum Paanch	Creative Director	-
2000-2008	Kahaani Ghar Ghar Kii	Creative Director	-
2000-2008	Kyunki Saas Bhi Kabhi Bahu Thi	Creative Director	-
2000-2008	Ghar Ek Mandir	Creative Director	-
2001-2008	Kasautii Zindagii Kay	Creative Director	-
2001-2005	Kkusum	Creative Director	-
2001-2004	Kaahin Kissii Roz	Creative Director	-
2001-2003	Kohi Apna Sa	Creative Director	-
2001-2003	Kutumb	Creative Director	-
2001-2002	Kabhii Sautan Kabhii Sahelii	Creative Director	-
2002-2004	Kya Hadsaa Kya Haqeeqat	Creative Director	-
2002-2003	Kammal	Creative Director	-
2002-2003	Kahi To Milenge	Creative Director	-
2002	Kuchh Jhuki Palkain	Creative Director	-
2003-2007	Kahiin to Hoga	Creative Director	-
2003-2005	Kkoi Dil Mein Hai	Creative Director	-
2003-2005	Kahani Terrii Merrii	Creative Director	-
2003	Kucch To Hai	Music Supervisor	Music Supervisor
2004-2007	Kesar	Creative Director	-
2004-2005	Kitni Mast Hai Zindagi	Creative Director	-
2004-2006	K. Street Pali Hill	Creative Director	-
2004	Kyaa Kahein	Creative Director	-
2004	Kkehna Hai Kuch Mujhko	Creative Director	-
2004	Karma	Creative Director	-
2004	Krishna Cottage	Music Supervisor	Music Supervisor
2005-2006	Kkavyanjali	Creative Director	-
2005-2006	Kaisa Ye Pyar Hai	Creative Director	-
2005	Koi Aap Sa	Music Supervisor	Music Supervisor
2005	Kyaa Kool Hai Hum	Music Supervisor	Music Supervisor
2006-2009	Kasamh Se	Creative Director	-
2006-2009	Karam Apnaa Apnaa	Creative Director	-
2006-2007	Kyaa Hoga Nimmo Kaa	Creative Director	-
2007-2008	Kayamath	Creative Director	-
2007-2008	Kya Dill Mein Hai	Creative Director	-
2007-2008	Kahe Naa Kahe	Creative Director	-
2007-2008	Kuchh Is Tara	Creative Director	-
2007-2008	Kasturi	Creative Director	-
2007-2008	Khwaish	Creative Director	-
2007	Thodi Si Zameen Thoda Sa Aasmaan	Creative Director	-
2008	C Kkompany	Music Supervisor	Music Supervisor
2008	Kartika	Creative Director	-
2008	Kaun Jeetega Bollywood Ka Ticket	Creative Director	-
2008	Kahaani Hamaaray Mahaabhaarat Ki	Creative Director	-
2008-2010	Kis Desh Mein Hai Meraa Dil	Creative Director	-
2008-2010	Tujh Sang Preet Lagai Sajna	Creative Director	-
2009-2010	Bayttaab Dil Kee Tamanna Hai	Creative Director	-
2009-2011	Kitani Mohabbat Hai	Creative Director	-
2009-2010	Pyaar Ka Bandhan	Creative Director	-
2010-2011	Tere Liye	Creative Director	-
2011-2013	Parichay : Nayee Zindagi Kay Sapno Ka	Creative Director	-
2013	The Bachelorette India	Creative Director	
2013	24	Creative Director	-
2014-2015	Itna Karo Na Mujhe Pyaar	Writer	-
2015-2017	Kalash - Ek Vishwaas	Creative Director	-
2015-2016	Gumrah End of Innocence	Creative Director	-
2015	Kuch Toh Hai Tere Mere Darmiyaan	Creative Director	-
2015	Tujh Se Hee Raabta	Director	-
2016	Meri Awaaz Hi Pehchaan Hai	Producer	House of Originals
2017	Ek Vivah Aisa Bhi	Producer	House of Originals
2020	Nikle toh Nikal logey	Producer	song for zee music
2020	Ashuddhi	Producer	Mini Series
2020	Operation Parindey	Showrunner	Released on ZEE5
2021	Tandoor	Director, Producer	MX Player Ullu App
