= Siddhant =

Siddhant is a given name in South Asia. It could refer to:

- Siddhant Chaturvedi
- Siddhant Karnick
- Siddhanth (TV series)
- Siddhant Bothra
