= Barsatein – Mausam Pyaar Ka =

Indian television series

- Genre: Romance; Drama
- Created by: Ekta Kapoor
- Screenplay by: Ritu Bhatia
- Story by: Jaya Misra
- Directed by: Atif Khan
- Starring: Shivangi Joshi; Kushal Tandon
- Country of origin: India
- Original language: Hindi
- No. of seasons: 1
- No. of episodes: 160

Production
- Producers: Ekta Kapoor; Shobha Kapoor
- Cinematography: Nidhin Valanday
- Editors: Vikas Sharma; Vishal Sharma
- Camera setup: Multi camera
- Running time: 22 minutes
- Production company: Balaji Telefilms

Original release
- Network: Sony Entertainment Television
- Release: 10 July 2023 – 16 February 2024

Barsatein – Mausam Pyaar Ka (transl. The Rainy Season – The Season of Love) is an Indian Hindi-language television romantic drama series that premiered on 10 July 2023 on Sony Entertainment Television. Produced by Ekta Kapoor and Shobha Kapoor under their banner Balaji Telefilms, it starred Shivangi Joshi and Kushal Tandon as the leads.

== Plot ==
Aradhana and her friend Rinky sit in a cafe and talk about how she met Reyansh Lamba. Reyansh Lamba is the CEO of Nation True News. Aradhana works at a small news company but wants to deliver some exciting news. Her best friend Pooja helps her sneak into Reyansh's party to gather evidence against him but before she could broadcast it, Reyansh gets it removed. Admiring her passion, Reyansh's father gives Aradhana a job at his office. Reyansh and Aradhana get off to a rocky start and Aradhana is triggered by the fact that Reyansh hates women. Soon she finds out that his hatred for women is due to his mother being in love with another man whilst his father and him felt unloved and unwanted. Aradhana aims to change his perspective. Aradhana finds out that Pooja is dating Reyansh's best friend Vikram. Pooja's family finds out about this and oppose the relationship. Reyansh sees Aradhana and Vikram getting close and misunderstands that they love each other. Reyansh, without realising it, falls in love with Aradhana and helps Vikram. They team up to wed Pooja and Vikram and Reyansh realises that Aradhana was only passing messages between them. After that, he continuously asks her if she is single and love blooms between the both. They spend a night together after confessing their love but soon realise that the CCTV cameras were left on. Aradhana gives Reyansh the USB with the trust that he will destroy it and they both plan to marry. The next day as Aradhana was supposed to meet Reyansh, she cancels on him to meet Mayank. Mayank was blackmailing Krishnan's sister and Aradhana went to expose him. But Mayank, who was fuelled with anger, told Reyansh that Aradhana was cheating on him. A heartbroken Reyansh, insults Aradhana in front of the office with the blame that she harassed him that night. Aradhana goes home crying only to witness that the video had gone viral. She finds out that she is adopted and is forced to leave the city.

Aradhana arrives in Dehradun, and meets Beena Aunty who lets her reside in Oswan Bakery. Soon Aradhana finds out that her real mother is Malini Khanna who is married to Viren Khanna and the mother of 3 daughters. Over a twist of events, Kimaya falls in love with Reyansh and get engaged. Reyansh's best friend Jai also falls in love with Aradhana unaware of her relationship with Reyansh. Jai gets blackmailed by Kriti and gets engaged to her. Bhakti reveals to Malini that Aradhana is her daughter. Soon Kimaya finds out the truth about Reyansh and commits suicide. Aradhana and the rest of the family blame Reyansh. Jai breaks of his engagement to Kriti. Aradhana moves back to Delhi as her father has forgiven her. Reyansh follows her back and has his mind set on marrying her. He hands out invitations and sweets to which Aradhana gets irritated. To get rid of Reyansh, Aradhana agrees to marry Jai and the wedding preparations start. However, Reyansh leaves no stone unturned to stop their wedding. But at last Jai marries Aradhana. However, it is revealed that their marriage is fake. Jai had requested Panditji to chant wrong mantras for their marriage. Later, a car accident occurred in which Reyansh is presumed to be dead. For this, Aradhana becomes traumatized. In order to get her well, Jai calls his another best friend Vaani who comes from abroad to help them. Later, Aradhana sees a man wearing black hoody. It is revealed that Reyansh is actually alive. Aradhana also gets well. On the other hand, Jai's mother Neeta is revealed to be involved in drug smuggling and Bhakti knows that. So, she decided to kill Bhakti and Bhakti meets with an accident and Reyansh took Bhakti to hospital. On the other hand, Aradhana discovered her marriage with Jai is fake. Meanwhile, Neeta frames Reyansh responsible for Bhakti's accident. Aradhana suspects on Reyansh. To find this out Aradhana proposes Reyansh but Aradhana got kidnapped. The kidnapper ask Reyansh to drop drug scandal story or else he'll kill Aradhana and shoots her. Aradhana is presumed to be dead. Reyansh is shattered but her sister believe that she is alive. Aradhana is alive and the kidnapper is Viren Khanna and Aradhana ran away from the kidnapper to release Reyansh from jail. Everyone goes to the kidnapper to find out why he was doing so. It is revealed that he was doing this drugs smuggling from a very long time and Neeta is his crime partner in that. He also wants to take revenge from Reyansh for her eldest daughter Kimaya's death. He tries to shoot Aradhana but unfortunately Jai gets shot as Reyansh removed Aradhana from the place. Jai is dead and his mother has guilt for her actions. Before dying, Jai tells him that it was all the plan of Kriti. She pressurised Kimaya to do so. After 3 weeks, Aradhana and Reyansh are finally engaged and going to marry each other soon and the rain (Barsatein) are back.

== Cast ==
=== Main ===
- Shivangi Joshi as Aradhana "Radhy" Sahni: Malini's daughter; Viren's step-daughter; Bhakti and Harsh's adopted daughter; Kimaya, Kriti and Komal's half-sister; Jagruti's adopted sister; Reyansh's fiancée
- Kushal Tandon as Reyansh Lamba: Kadambari and Vivek's son; Vikram and Jai's best friend; Kimaya's ex-fiancé; Aradhana's fiancé

=== Recurring ===
- Simba Nagpal as Jai Khurana: Neeta and Akash's elder son; Varun's brother; Reyansh and Vaani's best friend; Kriti's ex-fiancé
- Sai Ranade as Dr. Bhakti Sahni: Malini's best friend; Harsh's wife; Jagruti's mother; Aradhana's adoptive mother
- Vipul Deshpande as Dr. Harsh Sahni: Bhakti's husband; Jagruti's father; Aradhana's adoptive father
- Riya Doshi as Jagruti Sahni: Bhakti and Harsh's daughter; Aradhana's adopted sister
- Sameer Malhotra as Vivek Lamba: Kadambari's husband; Reyansh's father
- Poorva Gokhale as Kadambari Lamba: Viren's ex-lover; Vivek's wife; Reyansh's mother
- Ali Khan as Vikram "Viks" Kumar: Reyansh and Sunaina's best friend; Pooja's husband
- Prarthana Mondal as Pooja Kumar: Aradhana's best friend; Vikram's wife
- Aditya Bansal as Dr. Krishnan: Revathy's brother
- Disha Jain as Revathy: Krishnan's sister
- Tushar Kawale as Mayank Kaurani: Aradhana and Revathy's ex-boyfriend
- Tanaaz Irani as Beena: Oswan Bakery's owner
- Nausheen Ali Sardar as Malini "Mimi" Sehgal Khanna: Bhakti's best friend; Viren's wife; Aradhana, Kimaya, Kriti and Komal's mother
- Vimarsh Roshan as Viren Khanna: Malini's husband; Kimaya, Kriti and Komal's father; Aradhana's step-father
- Shreya Dave as Kimaya "Kimi" Khanna: Malini and Viren's eldest daughter; Kriti and Komal's sister; Aradhana's half-sister; Reyansh's ex-fiancée
- Aradhana Sharma as Kriti "Kiki" Khanna: Malini and Viren's second daughter; Kimaya and Komal's sister; Aradhana's half-sister; Jai's ex–fiancée
- Hritika Singh Kanwar as Komal "Koko" Khanna: Malini and Viren's youngest daughter; Kimaya and Kriti's sister; Aradhana's half-sister
- Sheetal Maulik as Neeta Khurana: Akash's wife; Jai and Varun's mother
- Pankit Thakker as Akash Khurana: Neeta's husband; Jai and Varun's father
- Akhil Wadhera as Varun Khurana: Neeta and Akash's younger son; Jai's brother
- Dipali Sharma as Baani: Jai's best friend

== Production ==
=== Casting ===
Shivangi Joshi as Aradhana Sahni and Kushal Tandon as Reyansh Lamba were signed as the leads. In June 2023, Ali Khan joined the cast to play Vikram, Reyansh's friend.

=== Development ===
In June 2023, the series was announced on Sony Entertainment Television by Balaji Telefilms. The series marks television comeback of Kushal Tandon into fiction after 6 years. The series marks the third collaboration between Ekta Kapoor and Tandon after Hum - I'm Because of Us (2018) and Bebaakee (2020). It also marks the second collaboration between Ekta Kapoor and Joshi after Bekaboo (2023).

=== Filming ===
The principal photography commenced at the Film City, Mumbai. Shivangi Joshi and Kushal Tandon also went on to make special appearances in Bade Achhe Lagte Hain 3 and India's Best Dancer 3 to promote the show.

== Reception ==
Prachi Arya of India Today noted, "Tandon effortlessly portrays his character's struggles, infusing the story with depth and relatability. Meanwhile, Joshi delivers a compelling performance, showcasing her versatility as an actress. Joshi's on-screen chemistry with Tandon is electric." Sukarna Mondal of Times of India stated, "Kushal and Shivangi's pairing looks crackling. Kushal looks in his usual serious demeanour and Shivangi plays her role perfectly as a journalist."

== Awards and nominations ==
Year	Award	Category	Recipient	Result	Ref
2023	Indian Television Academy Awards	Best Actress (Jury)	Shivangi Joshi	Nominated	
2023	Indian Television Academy Awards	Best Actress Popular	Shivangi Joshi	Nominated	
2025	Indian Telly Awards	Outstanding Performer of the Year	Shivangi Joshi	Won	

== See also ==
- List of programs broadcast by Sony Entertainment Television
