= Jaya Misra =

Indian author and screenwriter

- Occupations: Author, Screenwriter.
- Years active: 1993–present

Jaya Misra is an Indian author and a prominent Indian television and OTT screenwriter, having worked on series including Voot's most successful series It's Not that Simple (2016), and the hit web-series Kehne Ko Humsafar Hain (seasons 1–3) and Coldd Lassi Aur Chicken Masala. She is also known for authoring Kama: The Story of the Kama Sutra (2018), and writing the Sony TV series Barsatein - Mausam Pyaar Ka.

== Career ==
=== Film ===
Misra worked on various documentaries for Business Television India (BITV), including Hai Akhtari, Remembering Beghum Akhtar, Uttaradhikar, a glimpse of the Uttarakhand movement through the eyes of hill women, and a series of three documentaries on sex workers in India, Najayaz, AIDS lies & Documentaries and Tawaif.

Misra also wrote and directed several segments for the ICC Champions Trophy 2002 and ICC Cricket World Cup 2003 on Sony Entertainment Television, worked on capsules and pieces for various news channels, and wrote for events such as Lakmé Fashion Week and the Miss India Pageant. She also wrote the Hindi dubbed version of Mickey Mouse Clubhouse on Disney Junior.

Misra directed the documentary Surfing Yogis in 2014.

She was the Senior Creative Director for the Star Plus television show Ishq Kills (2014)

.

In 2015, Misra wrote the drama series Dosti... Yariyaan... Manmarziyan. Exploring the lives of two women from contrasting backgrounds, Manmarziyan received positive reviews. The Times of India stated that "Manmarziyan has created characters which are real and relatable to the youth today." However, it received low ratings and was cancelled after just under five months.

Misra next worked on season 2 of the Voot Original It's Not That Simple, which became VOOT's most popular series at the time. It's Not That Simple was met with a generally positive reception for its depiction of gender biases and messages of empowerment.

This was followed by another VOOT production, Time Out, which she co-wrote alongside Danish Aslam.

In 2018, Misra wrote the ZEE5 web series Kehne Ko Humsafar Hain, created by Ekta Kapoor. It received positive reviews for its complex and mature narrative. Misra returned to the series for its second and third seasons, which were also well received.

Misra is a frequent collaborator of Kapoor's, having worked on Coldd Lassi Aur Chicken Masala, Bebakee and A Married Woman. The series went on to be nominated at the Filmfare OTT Awards 2020.

=== Books ===
Influenced by the works of Anaïs Nin, Erica Jong, and Virginia Woolf, Misra is interested in issues pertaining to women's rights. Misra's debut novel, Kama: The Story of the Kama Sutra, was published by OM Books in May 2018. It received positive critical reviews which focused on the extensive world-building and Misra's writing style. Kama: The Story of the Kama Sutra is a fictionalised biography of Vātsyāyana.

The novel depicts the life and times of the Indian logician, who lived 2000 years ago and compiled ancient erotic texts with his aphorisms to create the Kama Sutra. Set in 273 A.D, in a land fraught with war and unrest, it tells the story of a catastrophic day in a writer-artist's life that sets him off on a journey beyond the boundaries of love, family and betrayal.

In 2019, Misra was invited to speak at TEDxMITID. Misra's talk focused on her journey in finding herself and her passion within literature.

== Filmography ==
Year	Title	Director	Writer	Notes
2014	Ishq Kills			Senior Creative Director
2014	Surfing Yogis	Yes		
2014–2015	Bandhan		Yes	
2015	Dosti... Yariyaan... Manmarziyan		Yes	
2016	Meri Saasu Maa		Yes	
2016	It's Not That Simple		Yes	Season 2
2017	Time Out		Yes	Mini-series (co-written with Danish Aslam)
2017	Shankar Jaikishan 3 in 1			Script Head
2018–2020	Kehne Ko Humsafar Hain		Yes	All Seasons
2019	Coldd Lassi Aur Chicken Masala		Yes	
2020	Bebaakee		Yes	
2021	The Married Woman		Yes	
2021	Darmiyaan		Yes	Audible series
2022	Appnapan – Badalte Rishton Ka Bandhan		Yes	Sony TV
2022	Aadha Ishq		Yes	Voot
2022	Murder in Agonda		Yes	Amazon mini
2022	Escaype Live		Yes	Hotstar
2023	Barsatein – Mausam Pyaar Ka		Yes	Sony TV
2024	TBD		Yes	Netflix Historical drama
2024	Marte Dum Tak		Yes	Amazon mini
2026–present	Shayad Yahi Hai Pyaar		Yes	Colors TV
2026–present	Dil Ki Bewafaiyaan		Yes	Star Plus
