= Karan Jotwani =

Indian actor

- Born: 12 September 1990; Mumbai, Maharashtra, India
- Education: H.R. College of Commerce
- Occupations: Actor; model
- Years active: 2013–present

Karan Jotwani is an Indian actor. He is best known for his portrayal of Sahil Agarwal and Jackie in Aap Ke Aa Jane Se, Neelkanth Bhatt Dhyani in Qurbaan Hua, and Imtiaz Alqaazi in Bebaakee. Jotwani made his film debut with Tumse Na Ho Payega in 2023.

== Early life ==
Jotwani was born on 12 September in Mumbai. He completed his graduation from H.R. College of Commerce and Economics, Mumbai.

== Career ==
Karan began his acting career in 2013 in the television world when he was cast in Hindi television series Bade Achhe Lagte Hain as Mandeep Bobby Singh. In the same year, he appeared in the teen drama Confessions of an Indian Teenager and Gumrah: End of Innocence in episodic roles.

In 2014, he starred in the mystery drama Laut Aao Trisha as Vivan Swaika and the MTV teen drama Kaisi Yeh Yaariyan as Aryamaan Khurana.

In 2016, he appeared in the episodic role of Yeh Hai Aashiqui as Ashish. In the same year, he portrayed the recurring role of Sayyam on Star Plus soap opera Suhani Si Ek Ladki until the show ended in 2017.

In late 2017, he was cast on Zee TV's soap opera Aap Ke Aa Jane Se in the lead role of Sahil Agarwal. In May 2018, he appeared in an episode of Zee TV's talk show Juzzbaat as a guest with Adnan Khan and Arjit Taneja.

In 2020, he joined the series Qurbaan Hua as Neel. In the same year, he joined the web series Bebaakee as a lead role alongside Kushal Tandon.

In 2023, Jotwani made his film debut with Tumse Na Ho Payega, playing Arjun Kapoor, an overachiever.

== Filmography ==
=== Films ===
Year	Title	Role	Ref.
2023	Tumse Na Ho Payega	Arjun Kapoor	
2026	Border 2	Venkatesh (Navy commando)	

=== Television ===
Year	Title	Role	Notes	Ref.
2013	Bade Achhe Lagte Hain	Mandeep Bobby Singh		
2013	Confessions of an Indian Teenager	Aditya "Adi" Kapoor		
2013	Gumrah: End of Innocence	Rohit Sehgal	Season 2	
2013	Heroes – The Fightback Files	Ayan Sharma		
2014	Laut Aao Trisha	Vivan Swaika		
2014	Yeh Hai Aashiqui	Ashish		
2014–2015	Kaisi Yeh Yaariyan	Aryamaan Khurana		
2014–2016	Box Cricket League	Contestant	2 seasons	
2016	Yeh Hai Aashiqui	Abhiram	Episode: "Hindu Muslim"	
2016–2017	Suhani Si Ek Ladki	Sayyam Salvi		
2018–2019	Aap Ke Aa Jane Se	Sahil Agarwal/Jackie Agarwal/Sahil Kashyap		
2018	Juzzbaat	Himself	Guest appearance	
2020	Qurbaan Hua	Neelkanth Bhatt Dhyani		
2023	Bekaboo	Ashwat Raichand	Cameo appearance	

=== Web series ===
Year	Title	Role	Notes	Ref.
2018	XXX	Chandani's boyfriend	Episode: "Sumitra G"	
2020	Bebaakee	Imtiaz Alqaazi		
2021	Firsts	Ankur	Season 6	

=== Music videos ===
Year	Title	Singer(s)	Ref.
2021	"Ijazataan"	Yashal Shahid	
2022	"Itni Mohabbat Karta Hoon"	Nihal Tauro, Amjad Nadeem Aamir	
2022	"Oda Vyah"	Jashan Singh, Dhvani Bhanushali	
2023	"Meri Banogi Kya"	Rito Riba	
2025	"Dil Darbadar"	Arpan Singh	

== Awards and nominations ==
Year	Award	Category	Work	Result	Ref.
2018	Indian Television Academy Awards	Best Actor (Drama)	Aap Ke Aa Jane Se	Nominated	
