= Pankit Thakker =

Indian television actor

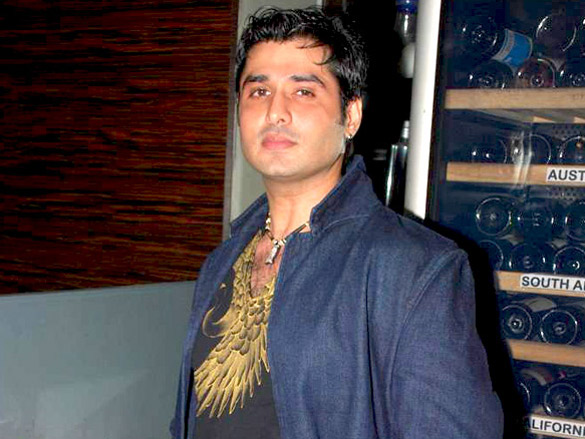
- Pankit Thakker
- Born: 14 March 1981 (age 45); Mumbai, Maharashtra, India
- Education: Neighborhood Playhouse School of The Theatre, New York
- Occupations: Model, Actor
- Years active: 2001–present

Pankit Thakker (born 14 March 1981) is an Indian actor who went to New York to learn the Meisner Technique of acting at the Neighborhood Playhouse School of the Theatre. He started his career in 2001 with Ekta Kapoor's extremely popular serial Kabhii Sautan Kabhii Sahelii, which originally aired on DD Metro, and later ran on Star Plus, DD National, and TV Asia.

Since then, he has appeared in popular shows on Indian Television. His roles as Harsh Bhatia in Kabhii Sautan Kabhii Sahelii, and Dr. Atul Joshi in Dill Mill Gayye on Star One have won him global appreciation.

Pankit Thakker gained international recognition for his critically acclaimed performance in the OTT movie Maaya Ka Moh (2024). The film itself received widespread praise, with reviewers noting his own performance.

Thakker's acting style is characterized by his ability to convey complex emotions through subtle expressions. His performances have been compared to those of Irrfan Khan, a renowned actor known for his nuanced portrayals. Thakker's recent body of work includes OTT films like Maaya Ka Moh(2024) and Divorce Ke Liye Kuch Bhi Karega(2024), as well as television shows such as Saru (2025) where he plays a central character with a tragic arc.

== Early life ==
Pankit Thakker was born in Mumbai, India, into a prominent business family. His father, a second-generation stockbroker, achieved significant success in his field. Thakker's family has a substantial global presence, with relatives in Australia, the United States, Dubai, Singapore, Hong Kong, and Canada. This international exposure broadened his perspective.

Growing up, Thakker demonstrated a keen interest in acting. He earned recognition for his dramatic skills in school and actively participated in school plays, theatre, and dramas. Notably, Thakker made a deliberate decision in eighth standard to choose Hindi as a language subject over Gujarati, despite being a Gujarati himself. This choice reflected his early ambition to become an actor.

== Personal life ==
Pankit Thakker was born in Mumbai, India. He spent his formative years in Ahmedabad, where he completed his schooling and education. Thakker holds a Master of Fine Arts degree in Acting from New York.

In his personal life, Thakker enjoys traveling and exploring new destinations. He is also an avid animal lover and shares his home with his pet cat, Whiskey.

Thakker has previously been in a long-term personal relationship, which has since come to an end. He is currently focused on his career and philanthropic endeavors.

Thakker is deeply committed to social causes and is a member of International Human Rights. He actively supports various charitable initiatives, preferring to contribute quietly without seeking publicity. Thakker currently resides in Mumbai, where he continues to pursue his acting career.

== Television ==
Year	Serial	Role	Channel	References
	Tamanna	Dev	DD National	
2001–2002	Kabhii Sautan Kabhii Sahelii	Harsh Bhatia	Metro Gold	
2002	Tu Kahe Agar	Karan	Zee TV	
2002–2003	Kaagaz Kii Kashti	Vikram	Sahara One	
2004	Tum Bin Jaaoon Kahaan	Dhruv	Zee TV	
2005–2006	Special Squad	Ajay Desai	Star One	
2005–2006	Kumkum – Ek Pyara Sa Bandhan	Krishnakant "Krish" Wadhwa	Star Plus	
2006	India Calling	Shanty	Star One	
2006	Twinkle Beauty Parlour Lajpat Nagar	Amar	Sony SAB	
2006	Man Mein Hai Visshwas	Rohit	Sony Entertainment Television	
2007–2010	Dill Mill Gayye	Dr. Atul Joshi	Star One	
2011	Surya The Super Cop	Sooraj	Sony Entertainment Television	
2011	Dharampatni	Vipul	NDTV Imagine	
2013	Kis Din Mera Viyaah Howega	Bablu	Big Magic	
2015	Yeh Hai Aashiqui	Yash	Bindass	
2016–2017	Bahu Hamari Rajni Kant	Dhyan Kant	Life OK	
2019	Tara From Satara	Akhil Sawant	Sony Entertainment Television	
2019	Tujhse Hai Raabta	Adinath Sayed	Zee TV	
2021	Aapki Nazron Ne Samjha	Chetan Rawal	Star Plus	
2022	Bohot Pyaar Karte Hai	Deep Malhotra	Star Bharat	
2022–2023	Janam Janam Ka Saath	Vishwas Kunwar sa	Dangal	
2023–2024	Barsatein – Mausam Pyaar Ka	Akash Khurana	Sony Entertainment Television	
2025–2026	Saru	Chandrakant Bajaj	Zee TV	

== Awards ==
=== Nominations ===
- Gold Award 2009 - Best Actor in a Comic Role as Atul Joshi for Dill Mill Gayye
- ITA Award 2015 - Best Actor in a Comic Role as Dhyan Kant for Bahu Hamari Rajni Kant
- Gold Award 2015 - Best Actor in a Comic Role as Dhyan Kant for Bahu Hamari Rajni Kant

== Web series ==
- 2015 - Fear Files: Har Mod Pe Darr
- 2020 - Scam 1992 as Head of ANZ Grindlays Bank (cameo)
- 2024 - Divorce Ke Liye Kuch Bhi Karega Mr. Panchal,Owner of IBN NEWS Channel

== Films ==
- 2001 - Tere Liye: directed by Sanjay Gadhvi
- 2010 - Zindagi Live
- 2024 - Maaya Ka Moh as Aakash who gets cheated on by his wife Maaya played by Priya Banerjee, directed by Ankush Bhatt
