= Phire Ashar Gaan =

- Genre: Music Realty
- Created by: Chayabani Balaji Entertainment
- Directed by: Victo
- Presented by: Sayani Ghosh; Biswanath Basu
- Judges: Bappi Lahiri; Usha Uthup; Amit Kumar
- Country of origin: India
- Original language: Bengali
- No. of seasons: 1
- No. of episodes: 20

Production
- Producers: Ekta Kapoor; Shobha Kapoor; Sougata Nandi
- Production location: Kolkata
- Running time: 45 minutes
- Production company: Chayabani Balaji Entertainment

Original release
- Network: Star Jalsha
- Release: 13 March – 31 July 2016

Phire Ashar Gaan is an Indian Bengali-language music reality television show that aired on Star Jalsha. The 20-episode first season was produced by Ekta Kapoor and Sougata Nandi under the banner Chayabani Balaji Entertainment.

== Hosts ==
- Sayani Ghosh
- Biswanath Basu

== Judges ==
- Amit Kumar
- Usha Uthup
- Bappi Lahiri
