= Dil Ki Bewafaiyaan =

Indian Hindi-language soap opera by Ekta Kapoor

- Genre: Mature love Family drama
- Created by: Ekta Kapoor
- Developed by: Ekta Kapoor
- Screenplay by: Anantica Sahir; Jaya Misra; Saima Ahmad; Bradley Fernandes
- Directed by: Prabjyot Gujral
- Creative directors: Siddhartha Vankar; Aakansha Shukla
- Starring: Gaurav Khanna; Shraddha Arya
- Country of origin: India
- Original language: Hindi

Production
- Executive producer: Varun Babbar
- Producers: Ekta Kapoor; Shobha Kapoor
- Camera setup: Multi-camera
- Running time: 20–22 minutes
- Production company: Balaji Telefilms

Original release
- Network: StarPlus

Dil Ki Bewafaiyaan (transl. Heart's Infidelities) is an Indian Hindi–language romantic family drama television series that premiered on 24 November 2026 on Star Plus and is available on the digital platform JioHotstar. Produced by Ekta Kapoor and Shobha Kapoor under the banner Balaji Telefilms, the series stars Gaurav Khanna and Shraddha Arya in lead roles.

== Premise ==
Bound by marriage and years of friendship, Mavav and his married–to–best friend Janaki have shared a life together, but never the fairytale romance Manav always dreamed of. As he longs for the grand love story they never lived, now step into their forties, can he give their bond a romantic makeover?

== Cast ==
=== Main ===
- Gaurav Khanna as Manav
- Shraddha Arya as Janaki

=== Recurring ===
- Aanchal Soni
- Pooja Banerjee
- Drashti Bhanusali
- Ali Abrar
- Keshav Mehta
- Krishna Shetty
- Parakh Madan

== Production ==
=== Development ===
Around mid August 2026, reports began circulating that Shraddha Arya and Gaurav Khanna were roped to play the leads in the upcoming show by Ekta Kapoor on Star Plus. Earlier in May, it was reportedly Arya and her Kundali Bhagya co–star Dheeraj Dhoopar were paired for Prateek Sharma's show under LSD Studios. But later, Kapoor confirmed the series at the end of Kyunki Saas Bhi Kabhi Bahu Thi 2. Khanna and Arya were seen performing Durga Puja rituals on the sets on 21 October 2026.

The show offers a male's perspective of marriange and raise the question that if everything is 'enough' for one in the same marriage, then why is there a 'wish' in the heart of the other. In a video posted on social media,producer Kapoor shared the thought behind the family drama and opened up about the question that became the inspiration, Can two people be happy in the same marriage while having different expectations and aspirations from life?

=== Casting ===
Shraddha Arya was roped to play the female lead, Janki and Gaurav Khanna was signed to play the male lead, Manav. Marking their return to daily fiction following iconic runs in Kundali Bhagya and Anupamaa, the project represents Gaurav’s maiden venture with Balaji Telefilms and Shraddha’s second major collaboration. This also marks Arya's return to fiction television after two years. Returning to daily fiction after a 2–year break, Khanna recalled, as an aspiring actor nearly two decades ago he was denied entering Balaji office and had to leave his photographs with the office guard and now fulfilling his dream with the show by the very same filmmaker. In an interview, Arya revealed that she and Khanna did a mock shoot for a different project on a separate network 13 years ago and during the final selection process, it came down to Gaurav Khanna and one other actor. Ultimately, Gaurav wasn't cast, and she was paired with someone else. Neither she nor Gaurav remembered the audition when they signed on for Dil Ki Bewafaiyaan. They only realized it when a crew member reminded them of their shared history.

Aanchal Soni joined the cast in a third collaboration with Kapoor following her stint in Naagin 7 and Kyunki Saas 2. Kapoor's frequent collaborator, Pooja Banerjee was cast in a negative role, marking her return to television after a 3–year hiatus.

=== Release ===
The first teaser confirming the series, where Gaurav and Shraddha had appeared together in a promo filmed at the Balaji office, where they smiled through questions from the paparazzi but offered no details about the show was released on 13 October 2026. Via a second promo released on 30 October, the title of the series was revealed as Dil Ki Bewafaiyaan. Reportedly, the show was set to premiere post Diwali. A promo released on 14 November introduced Manav and Janaki, through a conversation about marriage, romance and family responsibilities. The series was confirmed to be released on 24 November 2026. In a special promo released on International Men's day, Manav had a question for the men who always tell the family "I'll sort this out" and asked, when was the last time they ticked something off their own bucket list. The series airs on StarPlus at 9.00 p.m. slot, replacing Udne Ki Aasha in its time slot.

=== Filming ===
The series is mainly filmed in the revamped sets of Kyunki Saas Bhi Kabhi Bahu Thi 2 located at Film City, Mumbai.

== External link ==
- Dil Ki Bewafaiyaan at IMDb
- Dil Ki Bewafaiyaan at JioHotstar
