= Balaji Telefilms =

Indian production company

Balaji Telefilms Ltd.
- Type: Public
- Traded as: BSE: 532382; NSE: BALAJITELE
- Industry: Television
- Genre: Entertainment
- Founded: 11 November 1994
- Founder: Jeetendra
- Headquarters: Mumbai, Maharashtra, India
- Area served: India
- Key people: Shobha Kapoor (MD); Ekta Kapoor (Joint MD)
- Products: Television series Film production Web series
- Revenue: ▲₹593 crore (US$63 million) (2023)
- Operating income: ▲₹590.3 crore (US$63 million) (2023)
- Net income: ▼₹−38 crore (US$−4.1 million) (2023) (PAT)
- Total assets: ▲₹1,320 crore (US$140 million) (2023)
- Owner: Promoters: Jeetendra Ekta Kapoor Shobha Kapoor, 48%; Reliance Industries Limited: 25%
- Number of employees: 80
- Divisions: 2: Television Productions; Movie Productions
- Subsidiaries: Balaji Motion Pictures; BOLT Media Limited; Kutingg
- Website: balajitelefilms.com

Balaji Telefilms is an Indian company that produces Indian soap operas in several Indian languages. It also produces reality TV, comedy, game shows, entertainment, and factual programming. Balaji Telefilms is promoted by Ekta Kapoor and Shobha Kapoor and is a public company listed at Bombay Stock Exchange and National Stock Exchange of India.

In the 2000s, the company produced some historic blockbusters, which included Kyunki Saas Bhi Kabhi Bahu Thi, Kahaani Ghar Ghar Kii, Kaahin Kissii Roz, Kasautii Zindagii Kay, Kahiin to Hoga, Kutumb, Kkusum, Kabhii Sautan Kabhii Sahelii, Kis Desh Mein Hai Meraa Dil and Kasamh Se amongst several others.

In the 2010s the company produced several hugely successful drama series which includes Pavitra Rishta, Tere Liye, Pyaar Kii Ye Ek Kahaani, Bade Achhe Lagte Hain, Jodha Akbar, Yeh Hai Mohabbatein, Kumkum Bhagya, Meri Aashiqui Tum Se Hi, Kasam Tere Pyaar Ki, Kundali Bhagya, Kasautii Zindagii Kay 2, Yeh Hai Chahatein, Bhagya Lakshmi, Parineetii and Pyaar Ke Saat Vachan Dharampatnii.

In July 2025, Balaji revived one of their iconic soap opera as a reboot and sequel, Kyunki Saas Bhi Kabhi Bahu Thi 2 and introduced its spin-off, Kyunki Rishton Ke Bhi Roop Badalte Hain in March 2026. The second season concluded on 20 October 2026.

Since 2015, the company introduced several seasonal format weekend drama thriller series which went out to be highly rated series amongst which includes Naagin (TV series) (currently gearing up for its 8th season), Kavach (TV series) (2 seasons), Brahmarakshas (2 seasons), Haiwaan : The Monster, Daayan (TV series) and Qayamat Ki Raat amongst several others.

In 2017, the company launched its biography, Kingdom of the Soap Queen: The Story of Balaji Telefilms.

In 2025, Balaji Telefilms and Netflix announced a long-term partnership to collaborate on original films and series across multiple genres for the Indian market.

In September 2026, Balaji Telefilms and YouTube announced a partnership to produce 5 Youtube Original shows with each 200 episodes long produced under Balaji Originals banner. Ekta Kapoor will lead the creative vision and intellectual property while YouTube provide distribution and monetisation through ads and brand deals.

== History ==
The company was registered as 'Balaji Telefilms Private Limited' on 11 November 1994 in Mumbai, India, with the objective of creating serials and other entertainment content by Ekta Kapoor and Shobha Kapoor. Balaji has specialized in formatted programming that can be adapted for languages around the nation as well as abroad. The most notable success includes Kasautii Zindagii Kay where she introduced the biggest fictional characters like Prerna and Komolika and Kyunki Saas Bhi Kabhi Bahu Thi. Other examples include Kahaani Ghar Ghar Kii, Kaahin Kissii Roz, Kahiin to Hoga, Kkusum, Kutumb, Kohi Apna Sa, Kasamh Se, Kis Desh Mein Hai Meraa Dil, Pavitra Rishta, Parichay, Kya Hua Tera Vaada, Jodha Akbar, Tere Liye, Bade Achhe Lagte Hain, Yeh Hai Mohabbatein, Naagin, Kasam Tere Pyaar Ki, Kumkum Bhagya, Bhagya Lakshmi and Kundali Bhagya. The later five are dubbed and re-produced in several languages across India and Asia. In recent years the company has been expanding its reality show output with shows such as titles such as Box Cricket League on Sony TV.

Balaji was incorporated as a public limited company on 29 February 2000, and its name was changed to 'Balaji Telefilms Ltd' on 19 April 2000. The company made public issue of 28,00,000 equity shares of ₹10 each at a premium of ₹120 aggregating ₹36.40 crore. The issue included a book-built portion of 25,20,000 equity shares and a fixed price portion of 2,80,000 equity shares. In the same year, Nine Network Entertainment India Pvt. Ltd, a wholly owned subsidiary of Nine Broadcasting India Pvt. Ltd., merged with Balaji Telefilms Ltd. During 2000–04 the stock market capitalization grew sixteenfold to ₹571 crores when Star India acquired a 26% stake in the business. In 2005, Balaji Telefilms had 21 Hindi television shows on air at the same time, a record in the industry.

Balaji Telefilms started a media training institute in 2010. Known as ICE Institute of Creative Excellence, it trains students in acting, cinematography, direction, modelling, etc.

In 2014, the company and Ekta Kapoor were subject to protests in Jaipur led by the Shri Rajput Karni Sena (SRKS), a Hindutva group. These occurred because of perceived communal slights in the Jodha Akbar television series.

In 2015, Balaji Telefilms produced a finite series, Naagin, which became the most viewed show on Indian television since its inception. The show won multiple awards and returned for its second and third season, which also generated high ratings. The fourth season of series was broadcast starting in December 2019 but it was not doing well on television so it was replaced by the fifth season of the series in August 2020.

In 2017, Reliance Industries acquired a 25% stake in Balaji Telefilms for Rs413 crore. The deal gave RIL access to Balaji Telefilms' content for use by telecom unit Reliance Jio.

== Current productions ==
Title	Genre	Channel	Premiere date	Ref
Kyunki Rishton Ke Bhi Roop Badalte Hain	Family drama Romance	StarPlus	20 March 2026	
Dil Ki Bewafaiyaan	Family drama Romance	StarPlus	24 November 2026	

== Former productions ==
=== Audio ===
Year	Show	Network	Language	Genre	Premiere	Cast	Ref.
2021	Darmiyaan	Audible	Hindi	Podcast series	14 October 2021	Sriti Jha, Shabir Ahluwalia	

=== Hindi ===
Year	Title	Channel	Genre	Premiere	Finale	Episodes	Ref(s)
Hindi
1995	Captain House	DD Metro	Horror	2 January 1995	29 November 1996	100	
1995	Hum Paanch (season 1)	Zee TV	Sitcom	1 March 1995	15 August 1999	270	
1995	Padosan	DD Metro	Drama	10 April 1995	8 May 1997	107	
1995	Mano Ya Na Mano	Zee TV	Thriller	16 June 1995	14 October 1996	68	
1996	Itihaas	DD National	Drama	6 May 1996	17 September 1998	488	
1999	Bandhan	DD Metro	Drama	20 September 1999	28 December 2000	268	
1999	Kanyadaan	Sony TV	Drama	18 October 1999	7 July 2000	142	
1999	Karma Mayavi Nagri	DD National	Action; Drama	9 November 1999	2 November 2000	52	
2000	Kaun	DD National	Horror	25 February 2000	2 September 2000	52	
2000	Kashti	Zee TV	Drama	1 March 2000	17 May 2001	148	
2000	Koshish ... Ek Aasha	Zee TV	Drama	7 March 2000	11 April 2002	117	
2000	Ghar Ek Mandir	Sony TV	Drama	24 April 2000	23 March 2002	360	
2000	Kyunki Saas Bhi Kabhi Bahu Thi	Star Plus	Drama	3 July 2000	6 November 2008	1833	
2000	Kasamm	DD National	Drama	23 August 2000	7 December 2001	268	
2000	Kundali	Metro Gold	Drama	12 September 2000	7 September 2001	52	
2000	Kahaani Ghar Ghar Kii	Star Plus	Drama	16 October 2000	9 October 2008	1661	
2000	Kavita	Metro Gold	Drama	18 October 2000	6 September 2001	78	
2001	Karam	SAB TV	Drama	16 January 2001	12 March 2002	60	
2001	Kabhii Sautan Kabhii Sahelii	Metro Gold / Star Plus	Drama	19 February 2001	14 November 2002	223	
2001	Kuch Khona Hai Kuch Pana Hai	DD Metro	Drama	5 March 2001	9 July 2001	17	
2001	Kaliren	DD Metro	Drama	19 March 2001	6 July 2001	79	
2001	Kaahin Kissii Roz	Star Plus	Thriller	23 April 2001	23 September 2004	714	
2001	Kkusum	Sony TV	Drama	2 May 2001	30 November 2005	1001	
2001	Kohi Apna Sa	Zee TV	Drama	15 October 2001	15 January 2003	312	
2001	Kalash	Star Plus	Drama	20 October 2001	20 February 2003	270	
2001	Kutumb	Sony TV	Drama	29 October 2001	7 February 2003	251	
2001	Kasautii Zindagii Kay	Star Plus	Drama	29 October 2001	28 February 2008	1423	
2002	Kitne Kool Hai Hum	Zee TV	Sitcom	15 April 2002	13 February 2003	160	
2002	Kuchh Jhuki Palkain	Sony TV	Drama	29 April 2002	8 January 2003	147	
2002	Kammal	Zee TV	Drama	1 July 2002	20 March 2003	152	
2002	Kya Hadsaa Kya Haqeeqat	Sony TV	Thriller Horror	1 August 2002	14 April 2004	252	
2002	Kahi To Milenge	Sahara One	Drama	11 November 2002	23 October 2003	240	
2002	Hum Paanch 2	Zee TV	Sitcom	19 November 2002	12 August 2003	42	
2003	Kahani Terrii Merrii	Sony TV	Drama	21 January 2003	21 August 2003	112	
2003	Kayaamat	DD National / M-Net	Drama	7 April 2003	6 November 2003	156	
2003	Kahiin To Hoga	Star Plus	Drama	8 September 2003	16 February 2007	799	
2003	Kkoi Dil Mein Hai	Sony TV	Drama	21 December 2003	24 February 2005	260	
2004	Kkehna Hai Kuch Mujhko	Sony TV	Drama	11 March 2004	24 April 2005	165	
2004	Kesar	Star Plus	Drama	19 April 2004	31 May 2007	650	
2004	Kalki	Star Plus	Drama	27 August 2004	17 December 2004	16	
2004	Karma (2004 TV series)	Star Plus	Superhero	27 August 2004	11 February 2005	54	
2004	Kosmiic Chat	Zoom	Talk show	19 September 2004	13 February 2005	20	
2004	Kyaa Kahein	Zoom	Drama	17 September 2004	30 March 2005	42	
2004	Kaarthika	Hungama TV	Teen drama	27 September 2004	23 December 2004	52	
2004	K. Street Pali Hill	Star Plus	Thriller	27 September 2004	12 October 2006	428	
2004	Kitni Mast Hai Zindagi	MTV India	Teen drama	25 October 2004	18 May 2005	107	
2005	Kkavyanjali	Star Plus	Drama	25 January 2005	28 August 2006	345	
2005	Kaisa Ye Pyar Hai	Sony TV	Drama	29 March 2005	5 October 2006	331	
2005	Hum Paanch – Tadka Mar Ke	Zee TV	Sitcom	5 November 2005	22 April 2006	42	
2006	Kasamh Se	Zee TV	Drama	16 January 2006	12 March 2009	742	
2006	Kandy Floss	Sony TV	Talk show	10 March 2006	28 July 2006	20	
2006	Kyaa Hoga Nimmo Kaa	Star One	Drama	20 March 2006	18 January 2007	176	
2006	Thodi Si Zameen Thoda Sa Aasmaan	Star Plus	Drama	20 August 2006	2 September 2007	100	
2006	Karam Apnaa Apnaa	Star Plus	Drama	29 August 2006	27 March 2009	603	
2007	Kayamath	Star Plus	Drama series	19 February 2007	12 March 2009	411	
2007	Kasturi	Star Plus	Drama series	23 April 2007	31 March 2009	350	
2007	Khwaish	Sony TV	Drama series	16 July 2007	24 April 2008	163	
2007	Kahe Naa Kahe	9X	Drama series	12 November 2007	5 July 2008	150	
2007	Kuchh Is Tara	Sony TV	Drama series	26 November 2007	28 August 2008	160	
2007	Kya Dill Mein Hai	9X	Drama series	1 December 2007	8 November 2008	98	
2008	Kis Desh Mein Hai Meraa Dil	Star Plus	Drama series	3 March 2008	5 February 2010	444	
2008	Kaun Jeetega Bollywood Ka Ticket	9X	Reality TV	6 July 2008	28 December 2008	26	
2008	Kahaani Hamaaray Mahaabhaarat Ki	9X	Mythology	7 July 2008	6 November 2008	75	
2008	Kabhi Kabhii Pyaar Kabhi Kabhii Yaar	Sony TV	Dance; Reality	9 July 2008	21 August 2008	14	
2008	Tujh Sang Preet Lagai Sajna	Star Plus	Drama	3 November 2008	5 February 2010	295	
2009	Kitani Mohabbat Hai 1	Imagine TV	Drama; Romance	19 January 2009	25 September 2009	170	
2009	Bandini	Imagine TV	Drama	19 January 2009	29 January 2011	518	
2009	Koi Aane Ko Hai	Colors TV	Horror	13 March 2009	2 October 2009	52	
2009	Pavitra Rishta	Zee TV	Drama	1 June 2009	24 October 2014	1424	
2009	Shraddha	Star Plus	Drama	28 September 2009	15 January 2010	80	
2009	Bayttaab Dil Kee Tamanna Hai	Sony TV	Drama	6 October 2009	24 February 2010	82	
2009	Pyaar Ka Bandhan	Sony TV	Drama	7 October 2009	28 April 2010	108	
2009	Bairi Piya	Colors TV	Drama	21 October 2009	3 September 2010	252	
2010	Sarvggun Sampanna	Imagine TV	Drama	11 May 2010	29 October 2010	125	
2010	Keshav Pandit	Zee TV	Drama	15 May 2010	24 July 2010	11	
2010	Tere Liye	Star Plus	Drama	14 June 2010	2 April 2011	212	
2010	Pyaar Kii Ye Ek Kahaani	Star One	Supernatural	18 October 2010	15 December 2011	331	
2010	Kitani Mohabbat Hai 2	Imagine TV	Drama	1 November 2010	26 May 2011	153	
2011	Bade Achhe Lagte Hain	Sony TV	Drama	30 May 2011	10 July 2014	644	
2011	Parichay – Nayee Zindagi Kay Sapno Ka	Colors TV	Drama	9 August 2011	15 March 2013	415	
2012	Kya Huaa Tera Vaada	Sony TV	Drama	30 January 2012	23 May 2013	276	
2012	Gumrah: End of Innocence	Channel V	Crime	11 March 2012	26 June 2016	269	
2012	V The Serial	Channel V	Teen Drama	26 November 2012	7 March 2013	75	
2013	Savdhaan India	Life OK	Crime; Thriller	15 February 2013	12 May 2013	26	
2013	Ek Thhi Naayka	Life OK	Thriller; Supernatural	9 March 2013	28 April 2013	16	
2013	Jodha Akbar	Zee TV	Historical fiction	18 June 2013	7 August 2015	566	
2013	Pavitra Bandhan	DD National	Drama	9 September 2013	8 December 2016	780	
2013	MTV Webbed	MTV India	Cyber Crime	14 September 2013	21 September 2014	37	
2013	Confessions of an Indian Teenager	Channel V India	Teen drama	25 November 2013	22 May 2014	52	
2013	Yeh Hai Mohabbatein	Star Plus	Drama; Romance	3 December 2013	18 December 2019	1895	
2014	Kumkum Bhagya	Zee TV	Drama	15 April 2014	21 September 2025	3208	
2014	Meri Aashiqui Tum Se Hi	Colors TV	Romance; Drama	24 June 2014	19 February 2016	446	
2014	Ajeeb Daastaan Hai Ye	Life OK	Social; Drama	7 October 2014	6 March 2015	110	
2014	Yeh Dil Sun Raha Hai	Sony Pal	Drama	16 October 2014	13 February 2015	94	
2014	Itna Karo Na Mujhe Pyaar	Sony TV	Drama	18 November 2014	17 November 2015	208	
2014	Box Cricket League 1	Sony TV	Reality TV; Sports	15 December 2014	22 January 2015	24	
2015	Kalash – Ek Vishwaas	Life OK	Drama	23 March 2015	17 March 2017	518	
2015	Nach Baliye 7	Star Plus	Dance; Reality	26 April 2015	19 July 2015	20	
2015	Kuch Toh Hai Tere Mere Darmiyaan	Star Plus	Drama	28 September 2015	2 January 2016	83	
2015	Pyaar Ko Ho Jaane Do	Sony TV	Drama	20 October 2015	29 January 2016	73	
2015	Yeh Kahan Aa Gaye Hum	&TV	Thriller	26 October 2015	24 August 2016	214	
2015	Naagin 1: Mohabbat Aur Inteqaam Ki Dastaan	Colors TV	Supernatural fiction Fantasy; Thriller	1 November 2015	5 June 2016	62	
2016	Box Cricket League 2	Colors TV	Reality TV; Sports	20 February 2016	31 July 2016	24	
2016	Kasam Tere Pyaar Ki	Colors TV	Drama; Romance	7 March 2016	27 July 2018	623	
2016	Kavach...Kaali Shaktiyon Se	Colors TV	Supernatural; Horror	11 June 2016	20 November 2016	47	
2016	Mazaak Mazaak Mein	Life OK	Stand-up comedy	23 July 2016	25 September 2016	20	
2016	Brahmarakshas 1 – Jaag Utha Shaitaan	Zee TV	Fantasy; Thriller	6 August 2016	18 February 2017	57	
2016	Naagin 2	Colors TV	Supernatural fiction Fantasy; Thriller	8 October 2016	25 June 2017	75	
2016	Chandra Nandini	Star Plus	Historical; Drama	10 October 2016	10 November 2017	286	
2016	Pardes Mein Hai Meraa Dil	Star Plus	Romance; Drama	7 November 2016	30 June 2017	170	
2017	Dhhai Kilo Prem	Star Plus	Family; Drama	3 April 2017	30 September 2017	152	
2017	Chandrakanta — Ek Mayavi Prem Gaatha	Colors TV	Fantasy	24 June 2017	16 June 2018	94	
2017	Kundali Bhagya	Zee TV	Drama	12 July 2017	6 December 2024	2048	
2018	Box Cricket League 3	MTV India	Reality TV; Sports	26 February 2018	4 April 2018	23	
2018	Naagin 3	Colors TV	Supernatural fiction Fantasy; Thriller	2 June 2018	26 May 2019	103	
2018	Dil Hi Toh Hai	Sony TV	Drama	18 June 2018	1 November 2018	90	
2018	Qayamat Ki Raat	Star Plus	Thriller	23 June 2018	17 February 2019	70	
2018	Kasautii Zindagii Kay 2	Star Plus	Drama	25 September 2018	3 October 2020	468	
2018	Daayan	&TV	Supernatural horror	15 December 2018	28 July 2019	66	
2019	Box Cricket League 4	MTV India	Reality TV; Sports	29 April 2019	22 May 2019	18	
2019	Kavach... Maha Shivratri	Colors TV	Supernatural horror	25 May 2019	27 October 2019	42	
2019	Bepanah Pyaar	Colors TV	Thriller; Drama	3 June 2019	28 February 2020	190	
2019	Haiwaan : The Monster	Zee TV	Sci-Fi; Fantasy	31 August 2019	16 February 2020	50	
2019	Naagin 4: Bhagya Ka Zehreela Khel	Colors TV	Supernatural fiction Fantasy; Thriller	14 December 2019	8 August 2020	37	
2019	Yeh Hai Chahatein	StarPlus	Drama	19 December 2019	18 September 2024	1485	
2020	Pavitra Bhagya	Colors TV	Drama; Romance	2 March 2020	2 October 2020	74	
2020	Naagin 5	Colors TV	Supernatural fiction Fantasy; Thriller	9 August 2020	6 February 2021	52	
2020	Prem Bandhan	Dangal TV	Drama	30 September 2020	9 June 2021	166	
2020	Molkki	Colors TV	Social; Drama	16 November 2020	11 February 2022	322	
2020	Brahmarakshas 2: Phir Jaag Utha Shaitan	Zee TV	Supernatural Drama	22 November 2020	4 April 2021	39	
2021	Kuch Toh Hai: Naagin Ek Naye Rang Mein	Colors TV	Supernatural fiction Fantasy; Thriller	7 February 2021	21 March 2021	13	
2021	Bhagya Lakshmi	Zee TV	Drama	3 August 2021	29 June 2025	1358	
2021	Bade Achhe Lagte Hain 2	Sony Entertainment Television	Drama	30 August 2021	24 May 2023	453	
2022	Naagin 6	Colors TV	Supernatural fiction Fantasy; Thriller	12 February 2022	9 July 2023	146	
2022	Parineetii	Colors TV	Drama	14 February 2022	24 August 2025	1216	
2022	Appnapan – Badalte Rishton Ka Bandhan	Sony TV	Drama; Romance	15 June 2022	18 November 2022	119	
2022	Yeh Dil Mannge More	DD National	Drama; Romance	15 August 2022	12 November 2022	78	
2022	Pyar Ke Saat Vachan Dharampatnii	Colors TV	Drama	28 November 2022	29 September 2023	220	
2023	Molkki - Rishton Ki Agnipariksha	Colors TV	Social Drama	13 February 2023	22 March 2023	34	
2023	Bekaboo	Colors TV	Fantasy Drama	18 March 2023	6 August 2023	41	
2023	Bade Achhe Lagte Hain 3	Sony Entertainment Television	Drama Romance	25 May 2023	11 August 2023	57	
2023	Barsatein – Mausam Pyaar Ka	Sony Entertainment Television	Drama Romance	10 July 2023	16 February 2024	160	
2024	Pracchand Ashok	Colors TV	History, Drama	6 February 2024	29 March 2024	39	
2024	Chahenge Tumhe Itna	Shemaroo Umang	Drama	20 February 2024	19 August 2024	156	
2025	Pyaar Kii Raahein	Dangal TV	Drama; Romance	27 January 2025	28 June 2025	132	
2025	Bade Achhe Lagte Hain 4	Sony Entertainment Television	Drama; Romance	16 June 2025	19 September 2025	70	
2025	Kyunki Saas Bhi Kabhi Bahu Thi 2	Star Plus	Drama	29 July 2025	20 October 2026	450	
2025	Naagin 7	Colors TV	Supernatural fiction Fantasy; Thriller	27 December 2025	14 June 2026	50	
2026	Lock Upp (season 2)	Netflix	Reality show	27 June 2026	5 August 2026	36	

=== Other languages ===
Title	Network	Genre	First aired	Last aired	Episodes	Ref(s)
Bengali
Konya	Zee Bangla	Drama Social	28 February 2011	27 August 2011	144	
Sohaagi Sindoor†	Colors Bangla	Drama	18 January 2016	11 June 2016	125	
Phire Ashar Gaan†	Star Jalsha	Music Reality	13 March 2016	31 July 2016	20	
Rangiye Diye Jao†	Zee Bangla	Drama	11 December 2017	15 June 2018	135	
† produced under the banner 'Chayabani Balaji Entertainment'
Bhojpuri
Senur Mang Tikule	Mahuaa TV	Drama	18 July 2011	27 March 2012	168	
Kannada
Kavyanjali	Udaya TV	Drama	4 September 2000	23 August 2002	515	
Kannadi	Udaya TV	Drama	19 November 2001	29 August 2003	460	
Kavalu Daari	Udaya TV	Drama	26 August 2002	29 August 2003	265	
Khshanaa Khshanaa	Udaya TV	Drama	26 August 2002	19 December 2003	345	
Kapi Cheste	Udaya TV	Drama	6 April 2002	19 January 2003	84	
Kanya Daana	Udaya TV	Drama	1 September 2003	12 May 2006	705	
Kumkuma Bhagya	Udaya TV	Drama	5 May 2003	4 May 2007	1045	
Kadambari	Udaya TV	Drama	22 December 2003	6 November 2009	1530	
Kankkana	DD Chandana	Drama	14 November 2005	19 September 2007	500	
Kalyanee	Udaya TV	Drama	21 November 2005	4 May 2007	380	
Kankkana	Udaya TV	Drama	1 December 2008	3 April 2009	95	
Kalyanee	Udaya TV	Drama	9 November 2009	31 August 2012	730	
Kadiruve Ninagaagi	Udaya TV	Drama	12 June 2010	24 October 2010	40	
Yuggadi	Udaya TV	Drama	16 May 2011	30 August 2013	335	
Pavithra Bandhana	ETV Kannada	Drama	23 April 2012	17 May 2013	275	
Malayalam
Kavyanjali	Surya TV	Drama	24 May 2004	25 August 2006	585	
Pavithra Bandham	Surya TV	Drama	4 April 2005	4 August 2006	347	
Kalyani	Surya TV	Drama	28 August 2006	20 June 2008	470	
Koottukaari	Surya TV	Drama	24 November 2008	28 August 2009	198	
Kadhaparayum Kaaviyaanjali	Surya TV	Drama	20 July 2009	16 April 2010	191	
Marathi
Maziya Priyala Preet Kalena	Zee Marathi	Drama	14 June 2010	30 July 2011	350	
Bandh Reshmache	Star Pravah	Drama	21 February 2011	17 March 2012	198	
Arundhati	Zee Marathi	Drama	10 October 2011	14 April 2012	162	
Rang Maza Vegla	Saam TV	Drama	2 April 2012	21 September 2012	125	
Mission Dosti.com	Saam TV	Drama	28 May 2012	4 January 2013	160	
Tumchya Aamchyatali Kusum	Sony Marathi	Drama	4 October 2021	26 February 2022	129	
Durga	Colors Marathi	Drama	26 August 2024	24 November 2024	89	
Punjabi		Drama				
Kinna Sonaa Tenu Rab Ne Banaya	GET Punjabi	Drama	2 January 2012	28 September 2012	195	
Tamil
Pasamalargal	Sun TV	Drama	5 January 1998	23 March 1999	315	
Kudumbam	Sun TV	Drama	24 March 1999	5 October 2001	500	
Kelunga Maamiyare Neengalum Marumagalthan	Sun TV	Drama	8 October 2001	4 October 2002	365	
Kulavilakku	Sun TV	Drama	7 October 2002	22 October 2004	450	
Kanavarukkaga	Sun TV	Drama	25 October 2004	18 August 2006	454	
Kasthuri	Sun TV	Drama	21 August 2006	31 August 2012	1532	
Kanmaneeya	Sun TV	Drama	27 October 2008	16 April 2010	340	
Kavyanjali	Star Vijay	Drama	2001	2002	485	
Kudumbam Oru Kovil	Star Vijay	Drama	2001	2001	117	
Telugu
Anubandham	Gemini TV	Drama	21 June 1999	27 October 2000	350	
Kutumbam	Gemini TV	Drama	23 August 1999	3 October 2000	295	
Pavithra Bandham	Gemini TV	Drama	15 May 2000	17 January 2003	700	
Kalisundram Raa	Gemini TV	Drama	30 October 2000	25 October 2002	508	
Pelli Kanuka	Gemini TV	Drama	15 January 2001	4 June 2001	21	
Kkalavaarii Kkodulu	Gemini TV	Drama	23 July 2001	1 July 2005	1024	
Kante Koothurne Kanali	Gemini TV	Drama	20 January 2003	19 March 2004	302	
Kavyanjali	Gemini TV	Drama	22 March 2004	1 April 2005	270	
Ka Kaa Ki Kee Ku Koo Ku	Gemini TV	Drama	7 April 2004	26 September 2004	52	
Karthika Deepam	Gemini TV	Drama	4 April 2005	21 July 2006	340	
Kalyanee	Gemini TV	Drama	4 July 2005	29 January 2010	1220	
Brahma Mudi	Gemini TV	Drama	29 June 2009	27 November 2009	100	
Kotha Bangaram	Gemini TV	Drama	1 February 2010	16 September 2011	425	
Kaliyuga Raamayanam	Gemini TV	Drama	12 July 2010	7 January 2011	130	
Kannavari Kalalu	Gemini TV	Drama	19 September 2011	6 April 2012	143	
Nuvvu Nachav	Gemini TV	Drama	2 April 2012	31 August 2012	108	

== Web shows ==
Title	Genre	Platform	Release	No.of episodes	Notes
Kull: The Legacy of the Raisingghs	Drama	JioHotstar	2025	8	
Power of Paanch	Drama	JioHotstar	2025	50	
Dus June Kii Raat (Chapter 1 to 4)	Comedy	JioCinema	2024-2025	23	
Pyaar Sey Bandhe Rishte	Drama; Romance	YouTube	August-December 2025	61	Starred Avinash Mishra and Dipali Sharma.
Saas Bahu Aur Swaad	Drama; Romance	YouTube	October 2025-January 2026	30	Starred Abhishek Malik and Chahat Pandey.
Honestly, Why Not? with MNL (season 1)	Podcast	YouTube	February-March 2026	6	Interview hosted by Mohamed Nagaman.
Pyaar Kii Raahein (season 2)	Drama; Romance; Thriller	YouTube	February-June 2026	60	Starred Manav Dua and Rachana Parulkar.
Ishk Dum Aur Idli Rasam	Drama; Romance	YouTube	May-July 2026	30	Co-produced by Surbhi Chandna's Feel Good Studios. It stars Abhishek Kumar and Shiny Doshi.
Honestly, Why Not? with MNL (season 2)	Podcast	YouTube	5 July 2026-Ongoing	5	Interview hosted by Mohamed Nagaman Lateef.

== See also ==
- Balaji Motion Pictures – a subsidiary of Balaji Telefilms Limited that produces and distributes motion pictures
- List of accolades received by Balaji Telefilms
