= Kya Huaa Tera Vaada =

Indian soap opera

- Genre: Soap opera
- Developed by: Ekta Kapoor
- Written by: Sonali Jaffar; Dilip Jha; Archita Biswas Jha; Damini K Shetty; Vinod Ranganathan; Nandini Arora; Dheeraj Sarna (Dialogues)
- Starring: See Below
- Theme music composer: Lalit Sen; Lenin Nandi; Hriju Roy
- Opening theme: "Kya Huaa Tera Vaada" by Pamela Jain
- Country of origin: India
- Original language: Hindi
- No. of seasons: 1
- No. of episodes: 277

Production
- Producers: Ekta Kapoor; Shobha Kapoor
- Production locations: Mumbai, India
- Cinematography: Deepak Malwankar
- Editors: Viraj sharma Vishal Sharma
- Camera setup: Multi-camera
- Running time: 24 minutes
- Production company: Balaji Telefilms

Original release
- Network: Sony Entertainment Television
- Release: 30 January 2012 – 23 May 2013

Kya Huaa Tera Vaada (transl. What about your promise) is an Indian soap opera that aired from 30 January 2012 to 23 May 2013 on Sony TV. The show stars Mona Singh and Pawan Shankar and Mouli Ganguly.

The show was produced by Balaji Telefilms of Ekta Kapoor.

== Plot ==
Kya Huaa Tera Vaada is the story of Pradeep Singh and Mona Singh, a couple who lives in Mumbai with their three children Bulbul, Rano and Rajbeer. Married for 12 years now, between their work and chores, they try their best to find time for each other but their responsibilities take precedence. Pradeep works in a multinational company and Mona takes care of the house and the family.

Pradeep's ex-girlfriend Anushka joins his company as his boss and the two start an affair. Eventually, Pradeep leaves Mona and moves in with Anushka, filing for a divorce. A heartbroken Mona attempts suicide but is stopped by Pradeep's mother, who encourages her to fight for her rights. While Mona becomes a successful professional, Anushka's ex-husband Shaurya Mitra starts blackmailing her. A desperate Anushka ends up killing Shaurya and lets the police charge a drunk Pradeep for the murder. Meanwhile, Anushka's adoptive brother Tarun marries Pradeep's younger sister Taani. Mona proves Pradeep's innocence in court. Anushka tries to kill Mona at a party but Pradeep comes in the way to save Mona. Before he dies, a guilt-ridden Anushka reveals that she and Pradeep have a daughter. Anushka is taken to prison but she swears revenge on Mona. At Pradeep's funeral, Bulbul remains unforgiving for what Pradeep did to her mother.

=== Ten years later ===
Mona's children have grown up. Rano, 17, and Rajbeer, 15, are carefree and mischievous. Bulbul, now 23, is very strict, but simple, selfless and mature. Mona runs a restaurant and still lives with Pradeep's memories. Bulbul has lost all trust in men after what her father did and now works as a journalist exposing men who take advantage of women. Bulbul finds out that since Anushka was released early from prison, she married a rich man in Australia, Balbir Bhalla, who also raised her daughter Anika.

Mona meets Jatin Chopra who owns the news channel Bulbul works with and who Pradeep's father had wanted her to marry years ago. He asks Bulbul to shoot a wedding where the groom is Vihaan and the bride is Bulbul's half sister Anika. Finding out that Vihaan's family is filing for bankruptcy, Anushka convinces Anika to break off the marriage leaving Vihaan broken-hearted and hurt. Vihaan decides to work under Jatin and is posted as an assistant to Bulbul who is unaware of his identity.

Anushka reveals that Anika is her and Pradeep's daughter. An angry Bulbul gets drunk and unknowingly reveals Pradeep's past with Anushka and Anika to Vihaan. The two connect. With help from Rano, Bulbul realises her feelings for Vihaan and they fall in love. Rajbeer's Australian university turns out to be fake; he comes home and tries to commit suicide but is saved by Jatin. Rano falls for a boy named Rohan who has been sent by Anushka to take advantage of Rano. When he starts blackmailing Rano, Anushka comes to her rescue and turns Rano against Mona. Vihaan is announced as chairperson of the company angering a clueless Bulbul.

Mona realises Anushka is responsible for Rajbeer's university fiasco and exposes this to the media. A series of misunderstandings leads to Jatin announcing that he'll marry Mona and she accepts. A furious Anushka sets Mona's restaurant on fire in which Vihaan is injured. Bulbul realises her mistake and confesses her love to him. Anika visits Vihaan and feels guilty. Rano and Rajbeer visit an injured Mona and reconcile with their mother realising Anushka's true intentions.

Anushka tells Anika about her real father and Anika decides to shift to Mona's house. Anika creates misunderstandings between Bulbul and Vihaan. Pradeep's father, Alok, decides to shift to Anushka's house and joins Rano and Rajbeer to create problems for Anushka. Vihaan manages to reconcile with Bulbul. Anika blackmails Vihaan into marrying her by using false evidence to show Rano killed Rohan. Rano comes clean to Jatin who explains everything to Bulbul. Along with Vihaan, they team up against Anika and start investigating. Mona finds Rohan is still alive and confronts Anushka who confesses to everything.

Anika overhears that Anushka had shot Pradeep and has been using Anika to get back at Mona. Heartbroken, she tries to commit suicide, but is saved by Mona and Jatin. An angry Anika tells Anushka that she wishes Mona was her mother. Anushka is shattered. Anika divorces Vihaan and makes peace with her family. Vihaan and Bulbul are married and Anika finds love with their colleague Jogi. Rajbeer, Rano and Bulbul accept Anika as their sister. Anushka blesses Bulbul and Vihaan, and apologizes to Mona for everything, saying she is returning to Australia. The show ends with Mona talking to Pradeep's photo.

== Cast ==
- Mona Singh as Mona Chopra – Kawal's daughter; Pradeep's ex-wife; Jatin's wife; Bulbul, Rano and Rajbeer's mother
- Pawan Shankar as Pradeep Singh – Alok and Suhasi's elder son; Manoj and Taani's brother; Mona's ex-husband; Anushka's ex-lover; Anika, Bulbul, Rano and Rajbeer's father (Dead)
- Mouli Ganguly as Anushka Sarkar Bhalla – Devashree's daughter; Tarun's adopted sister; Pradeep's ex-lover; Shaurya's ex-wife; Balbir's wife; Anika's mother
- Hiten Tejwani as Jatin Chopra – Mona's second husband; Bulbul, Rano and Rajbeer's step-father
- Sargun Mehta as Bulbul Singh Ruia – Mona and Pradeep's elder daughter; Jatin's step-daughter; Rano and Rajbeer's sister; Anika's half-sister; Vihaan's wife
  - Khushi Verma as Child Bulbul Singh
- Mohit Malhotra as Vihaan Ruia – Harsh's son; Anika's ex-husband; Bulbul's husband
- Neelam Sivia as Anika Bhalla – Anushka and Pradeep's daughter; Balbir's step-daughter; Bulbul, Rano and Rajbeer's half-sister; Vihaan's ex-wife; Jogi's love interest
- Siddhi Karwa as Rano Singh – Mona and Pradeep's younger daughter; Jatin's step-daughter; Bulbul and Rajbeer's sister; Anika's half-sister
  - Ananya Agarwal as Child Rano Singh
- Yatin Mehta as Rajbeer Singh – Mona and Pradeep's son; Jatin's step-son; Bulbul and Rano's brother; Anika's half-brother
  - Nandan as Child Rajbeer Singh
- Bhuvan Chopra as Alok Singh – Suhasi's husband; Pradeep, Manoj and Taani's father; Anika, Bulbul, Rano and Rajbeer's grandfather
- Apara Mehta Suhasi Singh – Alok's wife; Pradeep, Manoj and Taani's mother; Anika, Bulbul, Rano and Rajbeer's grandmother
- Deepak Qazir as Balbir Bhalla – Anushka's husband; Anika's step-father
- Ibrar Yakub as Manoj Singh – Alok and Suhasi's younger son; Pradeep and Taani's brother; Mallika's husband
- Ekta Saraiya as Mallika Singh – Manoj's wife
- Priya Chauhan as Taani Singh Sarkar – Alok and Suhasi's daughter; Pradeep and Manoj's sister; Tarun's wife
- Raunaq Ahuja as Tarun Sarkar – Devashree's adopted son; Anushka's adopted brother; Taani's husband
- Nandini Sen as Devashree Sarkar – Anushka's mother; Tarun's adoptive mother; Anika's grandmother
- Sanjay Nath as Harsh Ruia – Lilly's son; Vihaan's father; Jatin's friend and business partner
- Lily Patel as Lily Ruia – Harsh's mother; Vihaan's grandmother
- Buddhaditya Mohanty as Surinder Suri – Pammi's husband; Pradeep's best friend
- Delnaaz Irani as Pammi Suri – Surinder's wife; Mona's best friend and neighbor
- Darshan Pandya as Vineet Raizada – Priyali's widower; Anushka's former friend and business partner; Mona's ex-fiancé
- Maneka Lalwani as Priyali Raizada – Vineet's wife (Dead)
- Gajendra Chauhan as Mr. Chopra – Jatin's father
- Pratichi Mishra as Mrs. Chopra – Jatin's mother
- Chetan Hansraj as Shaurya Mitra – Anushka's ex-husband (Dead)
- Alka Amin as Kawal Kaur Chopra – Mona's mother; Bulbul, Rano and Rajbeer's grandmother
- Neha Bam as Mrs. Raizada – Vineet's mother
- Ajay Trehan as Mr. Raizada – Vineet's father
- Rujut Dahiya as Jogi – Anika's love interest
- Samridh Bawa as Rohan Kapoor – Rano's ex-lover
- Sanjeev Singh Rathore as Ashok – Pradeep's office friend
- Mayur Verma as Shyam
- Pranav Misshra as Ajay Gujral

== Production ==
=== Crossover ===
Kya Huaa Tera Vaada had two crossover episodes with Bade Achhe Lagte Hain on 4 & 5 December 2012.

=== Replacement ===
- Kya Huaa Tera Vaada aired its last episode on 23 May 2013, thereby completing 276 episodes successfully and was replaced by Bharat Ka Veer Putra – Maharana Pratap from 27 May 2013.

=== Remakes ===
- This serial was dubbed as Sonnathu Neethane in Tamil and aired on Jaya TV.
- This serial was dubbed in English for broadcast in Jamaica on CVM Television as The Promise.
- This serial is remade in Malayalam as Ente Kuttikalude Achan and aired on Mazhavil Manorama.
