= Kavita (TV series) =

Indian soap opera

- Genre: Drama
- Developed by: Ekta Kapoor
- Screenplay by: Samidha; Khalid; Dialogues; Sanjoy Shelhar
- Story by: Ekta Kapoor
- Directed by: Kaushik Ghatak
- Starring: See below
- Opening theme: "Kavita" by Priya Bhattacharya
- Composer: Saurabh V Bhatt
- Country of origin: India
- Original language: Hindi
- No. of seasons: 1
- No. of episodes: 78

Production
- Producers: Ekta Kapoor; Shobha Kapoor
- Production locations: Mumbai, Maharashtra, India
- Camera setup: Single-camera
- Running time: 24 minutes
- Production company: Balaji Telefilms

Original release
- Network: Metro Gold
- Release: 18 October 2000 – 6 September 2001

Kavita (transl. Poem) is an Indian soap opera created by Ekta Kapoor and co-produced by Ekta Kapoor and Shobha Kapoor under their banner Balaji Telefilms. The series premiered in 2000 on Metro Gold and starred Ram Kapoor and Smriti Irani. Initially airing on Metro Gold, the series was acquired and its airing was shifted to StarPlus after Metro Gold's closure.

== Plot ==
The series revolves around Kavita who is under various veiled attacks just because of her fight for truth and justice. Kavita belongs to a middle class family. She is jobless and to fight the financial crises her family faces, Kavita joins a restaurant as a waitress. The series explores the love between Rishi and Kavita and how they fight the circumstances to stand tall for their love.

== Cast ==
- Ram Kapoor as Rishi Grover
- Smriti Irani as Kavita
- Jayati Bhatia
- Maya Alagh
- Swati Chitnis
- Harsh Khurana
- Gufi Paintal
- Remi Kaler as Business Man
