= Kabhii Sautan Kabhii Sahelii =

Indian television series

- Promotional logo
- Created by: Ekta Kapoor
- Written by: Beena Gera; Anil Nagpal
- Directed by: Qaeed Kuwajerwala; Himanshu Gonsul; Ashwini Gaddo
- Creative directors: Monisha Singh, Nivedita Basu
- Starring: see below
- Opening theme: "Kabhii Sautan Kabhii Sahelli" by Pamela Jain
- Country of origin: India
- Original language: Hindi
- No. of episodes: 191

Production
- Producers: Ekta Kapoor; Shobha Kapoor
- Cinematography: Santosh Suryavanshi
- Editor: Md.Nazir
- Running time: approx. 25 minutes

Original release
- Network: Metro Gold; StarPlus
- Release: 19 February 2001 – 14 November 2002

Kabhii Sautan Kabhii Sahelii (English: sometimes co-wife, sometimes friend) is a Hindi-language Indian television soap opera that premiered on Metro Gold channel on 19 February 2001 and later shifted to StarPlus after the closure of Metro Gold. The series was produced by Ekta Kapoor's Balaji Telefilms.

== Plot ==
Kabhi Soutan Kabhi Saheli is the story of two childhood friends, Tanushree and Sonia. The two are very close and share everything. Things take a strange twist when they discover that they are both married to the same man, Harsh. This tests the purity of their friendship and their ability to face hard realities. Kabhi Soutan Kabhi Saheli is an emotional saga that tests the strengths of relationships.

The series ended with Tanushree and Sonia realising that Harsh is a greedy and unscrupulous man. In a show of strength of character and being strong independent women, they decide to leave him. Tanu goes on to marry her close friend Uday while Sonia chooses to remain single and bring up her daughter. For his many crimes, Harsh is sent to prison.

== Cast ==
=== Main ===
- Anita Hassanandani as Tanushree (a.k.a. Tanu)
- Urvashi Dholakia as Sonia
- Pankit Thakker as Harsh, husband to both Tanu and Sonia
- Daman Maan as Tanu's Father

=== Recurring ===
- Hiten Tejwani as Praveen: Tanu's youngest brother
- Dimple Inamdar as Manisha: Praveen's wife
- Prakash Ramchandani as Viren: Tanu's brother
- Seema Pandey as Kanchan: Viren's Wife
- Neelam Mehra as Tanu's mother
- Kannu Gill as Harsh's Mother
- Ujjwal Rana as Uday Kiran
- Abir Goswami as Ranjeet
- Pooja Ghai Rawal as Tanisha
- Harsh Somaiya as Tanisha's son
