= Konya (TV series) =

- Genre: Drama; Thriller
- Created by: Ekta Kapoor
- Directed by: Arindam Ganguly
- Country of origin: India
- Original language: Bengali
- No. of seasons: 1
- No. of episodes: 144

Production
- Producers: Ekta Kapoor; Shobha Kapoor
- Production location: Kolkata
- Running time: 22 Minutes
- Production company: Balaji Telefilms

Original release
- Network: Zee Bangla
- Release: 28 February – 27 August 2011

Konya (English:Girl) is an Indian Bengali soap opera produced by Ekta Kapoor under her banner Balaji Telefilms. The series premiered on 28 February 2011 on Zee Bangla.

== Plot ==
Kanya is the story of an eight-year-old girl born into a family of thieves who struggles to find acceptance in her own community. In spite of being blessed by divine powers she finds herself being labeled witch and ostracized by her own family.

The series is the story of her sensitive and kind nature that wins the hearts of strangers but her powers remain a curse for her in more ways than one.

== Cast ==
- Sumanta Mukherjee
- Subhankar Saha
- Shreyasee Samanta as Sumana
- Arindam Chatterjee
- Sahana Sen as Debjani Choudhury - Taani's school teacher
