= Kahi To Milenge =

- Genre: Drama
- Directed by: Gautam Sobti, Santosh Bhatt
- Creative director: Nivedita Basu Bharvi
- Starring: See below
- Theme music composer: Nawab Arzoo; Lalit Sen
- Opening theme: "Kahi To Milenge" by Sunidhi Chauhan
- Country of origin: India
- Original language: Hindi
- No. of seasons: 1
- No. of episodes: 240

Production
- Producers: Ekta Kapoor; Shobha Kapoor
- Cinematography: Santosh Suryavanshi
- Editors: Vikas Sharma; Swapnil Nerurkar
- Camera setup: Multi-camera
- Running time: 24 minutes
- Production company: Balaji Telefilms

Original release
- Network: Sahara TV
- Release: 11 November 2002 – 23 October 2003

Kahi To Milenge (transl. Somewhere will meet) is an Indian television series that premiered on Sahara TV, now known as Sahara One, on 11 November 2002.

== Plot ==
The series is based on the story of four adopted siblings who are separated by fate and destined to come together at the same college unaware of their connection and blood relationship.

== Cast ==
- Karishma Tanna as Tanisha
- Geetanjali Tikekar as Sanjana
- Aashish Kaul
- Ujjwal Rana
- Puneet Vashisht
- Shabbir Ahluwalia as Shashank
- Anupam Bhattacharya
- Amita Nangia
- Usha Bachani
- Dolly Bindra
- Gargi Patel
