= The Bachelorette India =

- Creative director: Nivedita Basu Rakesh Ravikant Tak
- Presented by: Rohit Roy
- Country of origin: India
- Original language: Hindi
- No. of episodes: 15

Production
- Production location: Mumbai
- Running time: 45 minutes

Original release
- Network: Life OK
- Release: 23 October – 8 November 2013

The Bachelorette India (tagline: Mere Khayaalon ki Mallika) is an Indian television reality show. which featured Bollywood actor Mallika Sherawat who set out to find "the perfect bachelor" for herself. It aired on Life OK.
