= Tujhse He Raabta =

- Screenplay by: Moomal Shunaid
- Directed by: Nivedita Basu
- Starring: Sara Khan; Yasir Shah; Zara Barring
- Music by: Sohail Haider
- Country of origin: Pakistan
- Original languages: Urdu; Hindi

Production
- Producer: Saurabh Pandey
- Cinematography: Anubhav Bansal
- Running time: 88 minutes
- Production company: White Light Army Pictures

Original release
- Network: Geo TV
- Release: 15 February 2015

Tujhse He Raabta is a 2015 Pakistani television film directed by Nivdeita Basu and written by Moomal Shunaid. This television film was produced by Saurabh Pandey and co-produced by Yasir Shah under the banner of White Light Army Pictures. It was first aired on Geo Television on 15 February 2015 at 7:00 p.m. in Pakistan.

It features Sara Khan as the lead role in this television film. She rose to fame with her appearance in the Indian soap "Bidaai" while her co-lead, Yasir Shah, is a Pakistani actor, producer, screenwriter and model who started his acting career in India. The special feature of this telefilm is the high-red production camera due to which it has feature film quality.

== Cast ==
- Sara Khan as Anum
- Yasir Shah as Farhan
- Zara Barring as Sofia
- Yatin Karyekar as Anum's father
- Madhu Anand Chandhok as Farhan's mother
- Anima Pagare as Samaira
- Vicky Thawani as Umair
- Naveed Zakaria as Doctor
- Amaira Thawani as Romaisa (Farhan's Daughter)
- Naman Shaw as Saif (Guest Appearance)

== Soundtrack ==
The OST is sung, written and composed by Sohail Haider, while Dua Malick was also the co-singer of the original soundtrack. Background music was composed by Durgesh Rajbhatt.
