= Pawan Shankar =

Indian Film and Television Actor

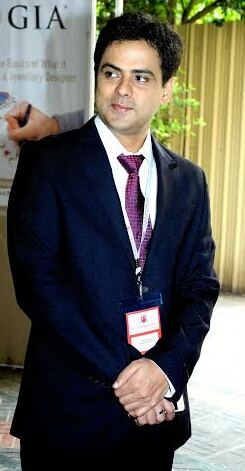
- Born: Prayagraj, Uttar Pradesh, India
- Education: St Joseph's College, Prayagraj, University of Allahabad, Institute of Management Technology, Ghaziabad
- Occupations: Actor, Television Presenter, Sportsman, Educationist, Entrepreneur, TEDx Speaker.
- Years active: 2005–present
- Known for: Siddhant
- Spouse(s): Yukti Shankar (Business Woman), CEO Fashionista Group of Exhibitions
- Children: Devasya Shankar; Aashman Shankar
- Parents: Shyam krishna Pandey - Historian, Writer, Academician, Social Acitivist, and Working Secretary, Hindi Sahitya Sammelan (father); Kiran Bala Pandey - Academician, Former Regional Director NIOS and Deputy Director of Education UP Govt. (mother)
- Relatives: Aditi Misra(Niece)
- Website: www.pawanshankar.com

Pawan Shankar is an Indian film and television actor who played the title role in the serial Siddhant on Star One. He holds an MBA in finance from Institute of Management Technology (IMT), Ghaziabad. An alumnus of Prayagraj's St. Joseph's College, Shankar graduated with a Gold Medal from University of Allahabad.

== Corporate life ==
Mr. Shankar has worked in companies including Triveni Engineering & Industries Ltd., Essar Cellphone, Hutch and ICICI Securities for about 4 years. Now he owns Fashionista Group of companies which is into Fashion, Lifestyle, Organic, Food and Beverage, Education, Wellness Exhibitions.

== Career in acting ==
He completed a course in acting from Kishore Namit Kapoor Acting Lab, Mumbai and won the Best Actor Critics Award in the Indian Telly Awards for his performance in Siddhant, a serial that won the best drama award in Indian Television Academy Awards. Shankar was nominated for the Best Actor category in Apsara Awards.

Film critic Subhash K. Jha and others reviewed Shankar's performance in Siddhant favourably. Shankar played the role of Sanjay Apte, a trade union leader, in Thodi Si Zameen Thoda Sa Aasman on Star Plus, well-reviewed by Subhash K. Jha. Smriti Irani played the role of his sister in this series.

Shankar worked as a model for more than 50 advertisements for Indian and Multinational brands. He played the title role in the TV series Vicky Ki Taxi on Real TV Channel. The major ads in which he appeared are Reid & Taylor, Ikea, Aviva, Colgate, Bharat Matrimony, Complain, Bajaj Allianz, Axis, India bulls, Graviera Suitings, Samsung TV, Horlicks, Vicks, UTI Mutual Fund, Dabur Homemade, Dabur Was Amrit, Tata Salt, Ghadi Detergent, Navratna Hair Oil, Aashirwaad Atta, Haier Ac, Wipro Lighting, Nature Fresh Cooking Oil, Federal Bank, TVS Centra Bike, Aviva Life Insurance and many more.

Shankar was the lead actor in the TV programme Kya Huaa Tera Vaada playing a man in an extra-marital affair on Sony TV produced by Ekta Kapoor.

His short film on relationship 'Adhure Poore Se Hum 2018' won several awards internationally and currently can be seen on Disney Plus Hotstar, Amazon Prime and MX Player.

Shankar did a negative role (cameo) for the first time in a TV show Guddan Tumse Na Ho Payega concluded in December 2019.

Shankar was seen in Ajay Devgn starrer Bhuj: The Pride of India on 14 August 2021 on Hotstar Disney Multiplex. Shankar plays the role of Antagonist in the film, Nora Fatehi was paired opposite him in the film.

Shankar recently appeared as Hasan Rahimtullah in Amazon Prime's Mumbai Diaries 26/11 (Season 2) and T-Series Film Starfish (2023 film) as Martin.

His upcoming film 'Empire' is coming soon on Jio Cinema which stars Taapsee Pannu and Arvind Swami in the lead, shankar plays the role of Vineet Bhai in the film. His next OTT++ project on JioCinema, Titled 'Power of Panch' produced by Balaji Telefilms shall soon get released.

== Films and television ==
Year	Show	Role	Notes
2005–2006	Siddhant	Advocate Siddhant Mehra	Lead role
2006	Aisa Des Hai Mera	Ajit Singh Gill	Lead role
2006–2007	Thodi Si Zameen Thoda Sa Aasmaan	Sanjay Apte	Supporting role
2006–2007	Kasamh Se	Advocate Tarun Sablok	Supporting role
2009	Vicky Ki Taxi	Vicky	Lead role
2009–2010	Jeet Jayenge Hum	Manas	Cameo
2012	Kya Huaa Tera Vaada	Pradeep Singh	Lead role
2019	Guddan Tumse Na Ho Payega	Vikrant Goyal	Negative Role
2021	Bhuj: The Pride of India	Md. Hussein Omani	Antagonist
2023	Mumbai Diaries 26/11 (Season 2)	Hasan Rahimtullah	Positive Role
2023	Starfish (2023 film)	Martin	Positive Role
2024	Power of Panch (OTT++ Jiocinema)	Mr.Adarsh Sidh	Negative Role

== Awards ==
- Best Actor – Drama, Indian Telly Awards for Siddhant 2005
- Siddhant (Title role by Pawan Shankar) was awarded by Hero Honda Indian Television Academy Award 2005 as the Best Serial in 2005
- Siddhant serial nominated for International Emmy's Award 2006. First serial from India to get nomination.
- Nominated, Best Actor Category, Apsara Awards of Producer's Guild Association for Siddhant 2006
- Exhibition Excellence Award 2016 (As MD, Fashionista)
- Bharat Excellence Award 2016 (Individual)
- Indian Award for Excellence 2016 (As MD, Educationista)
- Lead Actor – Honorable mention in a short Film for "You and Me" by The South Film and Arts Academy Festival April 2018 (SCAFA Fest)
- Bronze Award for Best Actor by Independent Shorts Award, Los Angeles April 2018
