= Kushal Tandon =

Indian actor and model (born 1985)

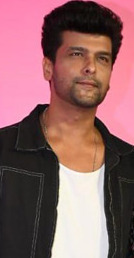
- Tandon in 2023
- Born: 28 March 1985 (age 41); Lucknow, Uttar Pradesh, India
- Education: Hansraj College; New York Film Academy
- Occupations: Actor; model
- Years active: 2005–present
- Notable work: Ek Hazaaron Mein Meri Behna Hai; Beyhadh; Barsatein – Mausam Pyaar Ka

Kushal Tandon (born 28 March 1985) is an Indian model and actor known for his works primarily in Hindi television. He gained prominence portraying Virat Vadhera in Ek Hazaaron Mein Meri Behna Hai, Arjun Sharma in Beyhadh, and Reyansh Lamba in Barsatein – Mausam Pyaar Ka. He is the recipient of an Indian Telly Awards and Gold Awards. He has also participated in Nach Baliye, Bigg Boss and Khatron Ke Khiladi.

== Early life ==
Tandon was born on 28 March 1985 in Lucknow, Uttar Pradesh. He did his schooling from the Scindia School, Gwalior and later studied in Hansraj College, Delhi and in New York Film Academy.

== Career ==
Tandon was the first runner-up of Grasim Mr. India contest held in January 2005. Upon return from the United States after his acting course, he played Virat Singh Vadhera in Ek Hazaaron Mein Meri Behna Hai. During the show, he shaved off his hair to show his support for a bald young cancer patient.

Later, Tandon participated in Nach Baliye 5 with his then partner Elena Boeva. In 2013, he participated in reality television show Bigg Boss 7. In 2015, Tandon was seen in Rahat Fateh Ali Khan's music video Zaroori Tha along with girlfriend Gauahar Khan.

In 2016, Tandon portrayed Arjun Sharma opposite Jennifer Winget and Aneri Vajani in Sony TV's Beyhadh. In 2018, he portrayed Rahul in Alt Balaji's Hum - I'm Because of Us. On 26 June 2020, he starred in tech horror film, Unlock in Zee5. In August 2020, he acted in ALTBalaji's Bebaakee.

Tandon also owns a restaurant called "Arbour 28" in Mumbai. He opened the restaurant in February 2020.

In 2023, he began portraying Reyansh Lamba opposite Shivangi Joshi in Ekta Kapoor's Barsatein – Mausam Pyaar Ka. Prachi Arya of India Today noted, "Tandon effortlessly portrays his character's struggles, infusing the story with depth and relatability. Sukarna Mondal of Times of India stated, "Kushal and Shivangi’s pairing looks crackling. Kushal looks in his usual serious demeanour."

== In the media ==
In 2012, he was ranked second in Eastern Eye's 50 Sexiest Asian Men List. Tandon was placed at 7th in the Times Most Desirable Men on Television in 2017.

== Personal life ==
Tandon and Gauahar Khan met during Bigg Boss 7 and started dating but broke up in 2014. In 2023, he met Shivangi Joshi on the sets of their show Barsatein. In 2025, Tandon revealed that they broke up.

== Filmography ==
=== Films ===
Year	Title	Role	Ref.
2020	Unlock	Amar	

=== Television ===
Year	Title	Role	Notes
2011–2013	Ek Hazaaron Mein Meri Behna Hai	Virat Singh Vadhera	
2012–2013	Nach Baliye 5	Contestant	9th place
2013	Bigg Boss 7	Contestant	7th place
2014	Fear Factor: Khatron Ke Khiladi 5	Contestant	14th place
2016	Kapil Sharma Show	Arjun Sharma	Guest
2016	Super Dancer	Arjun Sharma	Guest
2016–2017	Beyhadh	Arjun Sharma	
2023–2024	Barsatein – Mausam Pyaar Ka	Reyansh Lamba	
2023	India's Best Dancer Season 3	Reyansh Lamba	Guest
2023	Bade Achhe Lagte Hain 3	Reyansh Lamba	Guest

=== Web series ===
Year	Title	Role	Ref.
2018	Hum - I'm Because of Us	Rahul Nanda	
2020	Bebaakee	Sufiyaan Abdullah	
2026	Alliance	Contestant (Semi Finalist)	

=== Music videos ===
Year	Title	Singer(s)	Ref.
2015	Zaroori Tha	Rahat Fateh Ali Khan	
2022	Reh Jaunga Main	Neha Vaishnav	
2022	Numaish	Altamash Faridi	

== Awards ==
Year	Award	Category	Show	Result
2012	Indian Telly Awards	Best Fresh New Face (Male)	Ek Hazaaron Mein Meri Behna Hai	Won
2012	Gold Awards	Debut in a Lead Role	Ek Hazaaron Mein Meri Behna Hai	Won
2023	Indian Television Academy Awards	Best Actor (Popular)	Barsatein – Mausam Pyaar Ka	Nominated
