= Thodi Si Zameen Thoda Sa Aasmaan =

- Written by: Kamlesh Pandey; Anirudh Pathak; Jitesh Patel
- Directed by: Santram Varma
- Starring: see below
- Opening theme: "Thodi Si Zameen Thoda Sa Aasmaan" by Alka Yagnik
- Country of origin: India
- No. of seasons: 1
- No. of episodes: 100

Production
- Producers: Smriti Irani; Ekta Kapoor; Shobha Kapoor
- Cinematography: Sanjay Memane; Suhas Shirodkar
- Editors: Dhirendra Singh; Sharad Mulik; Kamlesh Singh
- Running time: approx.22 minutes

Original release
- Network: STAR Plus
- Release: 19 August 2006 – 2 September 2007

Thodi Si Zameen Thoda Sa Aasmaan (transl. A Little bit of Land, A Little bit of Sky) is an Indian television show broadcast on STAR Plus. The series was produced by Smriti Irani along with Ekta Kapoor. It aired during weekends from 19 August 2006 to 2 September 2007.

== Plot ==
A factory's workers have lost their job as the factory has shut down. Uma (Smriti Irani) has to work hard to run her family as her father and brother have lost their jobs.

Uma tries to motivate the people of her locality to work hard to conform various roles in the running of a mall, so they can all have jobs to run their families. Besides being a hard worker, Uma goes to school to fulfill her dreams even though that is not her parents’ priority.

== Cast ==
- Smriti Irani as Uma Apte
- Usha Nadkarni as Girija
- Pawan Shankar as Sanjay Apte
- Jaya Bhattacharya as Pooja
- Sanjeet Bedi as Munna
- Kiran Karmarkar as Sudhanshu
- Harsh Chhaya as Dushyant Jajodia
- Madhavi Chopra as Sapna
- Sachin Tyagi as Prashant
- Shweta Salve as Malvica Chopra
- Shraddha Nigam

== Production ==
The series was produced by Smriti Irani with her own new production house Ugraya Entertainment partnering and co produced with Ekta Kapoor's Balaji Telefilms, based on the real life incidents and set in Mumbai Chawl. When the contract between them got over after 52 episodes, Kapoor and Balaji Telefilms moved out of the production of the series in February 2007.

This is the first series produced by Smriti Irani and also the first one in which Balaji Telefilms were co-producers.

On 4 November 2006, main lead Irani playing Uma could not be able to shoot for the series as she suffered from dengue and typhoid and was admitted in hospital. However, with the bank episodes available, the series was managed without her and she returned to shoot back after a week.

The series initially had an average ratings but on progressing it dropped which made the channel to end the series in September 2007.

== Reception ==
Business Standard stated, "The dialogues and their delivery are suited to the way the language is spoken in such places. And though the characters portray emotions, they do so within realistic parametres."
