= Bebaakee =

2020 Hindi language web series

- Genre: Drama; Romance
- Created by: Ekta Kapoor
- Written by: Jaya Misra; Anuja Gondhalekar; Bradley Fernandes
- Directed by: Muzammil Desai
- Starring: Kushal Tandon; Karan Jotwani; Shiv Jyoti Rajput
- Country of origin: India
- Original languages: Hindi; Urdu
- No. of seasons: 1
- No. of episodes: 31

Production
- Producers: Shobha Kapoor; Ekta Kapoor
- Cinematography: Anil Katke
- Editors: Vikas Sharma; Vishal Sharma; Manas Mojumber
- Camera setup: Multi-camera
- Running time: Approx 22 minutes
- Production company: Balaji Telefilms

Original release
- Network: ZEE5; ALTBalaji
- Release: 30 August 2020

Bebaakee (Madness) is a Hindi-language drama web series directed by Muzammil Desai and produced by Ekta Kapoor and Shobha Kapoor under their banner Balaji Telefilms. It stars Kushal Tandon, Karan Jotwani along with debutant Shiv Jyoti Rajput in lead roles. The first eight episodes were streamed on ZEE5 and ALTBalaji on 30 August 2020 while the ninth and tenth were streamed on 2 September 2020. The next five episodes were released on 12 October 2020 while the remaining sixteen episodes of the first season were released on 11 December 2020. The series will receive a second season but the release date hasn't been officially announced.

== Summary ==
Set in Shimla, Sufiyaan Abdullah, Kainaat Sahani and Imtiaz Alqaazi, are three very different yet equally strong and stubborn personalities. While Kainaat is a beautiful journalist from a simple yet loving family with her priorities and ambitions in place, Sufiyaan is a womaniser from a rich but complicated setup. Rounding off the trio is Sufiyaan's best friend Imtiaz Alqaazi, a charming, caring and intelligent man who finds an instant kinship with Kainaat. Adil and Farhad, Sufiyan and Imitiaz's fathers have been best friends all their lives and are like family, and so are their children. All three lives are changed when the trio fall into a love triangle that questions theirs as well as their family's love and friendship and togetherness. The series focuses on Sufiyaan's ‘bebaak pyaar‘ (obsession, madness, insanity) and how he is willing to get what he wants despite the consequences.

== Cast ==
=== Main ===
- Kushal Tandon as Sufiyaan Abdullah; Adil and Rashida's son; Benazir's step-son; Rahil's older half-brother; Imitiaz's best friend/brother-figure and Kainaat's obsessed lover.
- Karan Jotwani as Imtiaz Alqaazi; Farhad and Dana's eldest son; Hamid and Farah's older brother; Sufiyaan's best friend/brother figure and Kainaat's husband.
- Shiv Jyoti Rajput as Kainaat Sahani Alqaazi; Indrapreet and Tahira's eldest daughter; Harleen, Falak and Dilsher's sister; Imtiaz's wife and Sufiyaan's love interest.

=== Recurring ===
- Sameer Malhotra as Adil Abdullah; Sufiyaan and Rahil's father; Farhad's best friend; Rashida's former husband and Benazir's husband
- Ananya Khare as Benazir Abdullah; Adil's second wife; Rashida's sister; Rahil's mother and Sufiyaan's step-mother/aunt
- Mohit Chauhan as Farhad Alqaazi; Imtiaz, Hamid and Farah's father; Adil's best friend and Dana's husband
- Suchitra Pillai as Dana Alqaazi; Imtiaz, Hamid and Farah's mother; Farhad's wife
- Indraneel Bhattacharya as Indrapreet Sahani; Kainaat, Harleen, Falak and Dilsher's father; Tahira's husband; and a college professor
- Pubali Sanyal as Tahira Sahani; Kainaat, Harleen, Falak and Dilsher's mother; Indrapreet's wife
- Saloni Vora as Falak Sahani; Indrapeet and Tahira's youngest daughter; Kainaat, Harleen and Dilsher's sister
- Aditi Vats as Harleen Sahani; Indrapeet and Tahira's middle daughter; Kainaat, Falak and Dilsher's sister
- Krutika Desai Khan as Rashida Abdullah; Sufiyaan's mother; Adil's first wife and Benazir's elder sister
- Juhaina Ahsan as Farah Alqaazi; Dana and Farhad's daughter; Imtiaz and Hamid's sister
- Pratik Sehajpal as Rahil Abdullah; Benazir and Adil's son; Sufiyaan's younger half-brother; Harleen and Falak's love interest
- Ishhan Dhawan as Hamid Alqaazi; Dana and Farhad's youngest son; Imtiaz and Farah's brother; Dilsher's lover
- Mahir Pandhi as Dilsher Sahani; Indrapreet and Tahira's son; Kainaat, Harleen and Falak's younger brother; Hamid's lover
- Nasir Khan as Joey Thomas; assistant of United India
- Massheuddin Qureshi as Wasim; Alqaazi-Abdullah's chief servant whom Sufiyaan is close to
- Palak Purswani as Laila; one of Sufiyaan's many lovers
- Rini Das as Serena; one of Sufiyaan's many lovers and therapist
- Vinitha Menon as Ruhi; employee of United India
- Krish Chugh as child Sufiyaan
- Gaurav Venkatesh as Andy; Alqaazi/Abdullah's family servant
- Rekha Desai as Dilshaad; Dana's personal maidservant
- Prakhar Toshniwal as Namik; Rahil and Hamid's best friend.
- Ashwin Dadlani as Vicky; Rahil and Hamid's best friend
- Paras Cchadha as Rohan; Rahil and Hamid's best friend
- Aarti Khetarpal as Nazia; Imtiaz's ex-girlfriend who has a fling with Sufiyaan

== Episodes ==
=== Season 1 ===
No.	Title	Directed by	Written by	Original release date
1	"Jab we met"	Muzammil Desai	Jaya Misra; Anuja Gondhalekar; Bradley Fernandes	30 August 2020
The story is about three completely different families. Kainaat lives in a very happy and loving family but her mother is diagnosed with stage 3 cancer. Sufiyaan lives in a joint family; Abdullah's and Alqaazi's. His father Adil has two wives, he cheated on the first one which was Sufi's mother and is also cheating on his second wife whom he has a son with, Rahil whom Sufi loves like a real brother. Sufi's childhood best friend is Imtiaz and they are like brothers. Farhad, Adil's best friend and Imtiaz's father has the opposite loving family and three children whom he loves all dearly. But his wife, Dana hates the Abdullah's and wants her family to have the full share as Alqaazi's have 70% whilst Abdullah's have 30% of the property. Imtiaz is away from home and is currently living in Africa. Sufiyaan and Kainaat meet by accident at a bar where they have an argument but don't see each other. They take each other's phone by mistake. Kainaat and her boss are working on a famous story which Sufiyaan was following up with the help of his phone. Kainaat's sees messages on his phone regarding the story and uses this opportunity to make this worldwide. However, as Kaiynaat breaks the story, Sufiyaan has the upper hand and buys Taza Khabar, the company she was working in and they finally meet eye to eye when she confronts him. He eventually fires her, shocking her.
2	"Hate at First Sight"	Muzammil Desai	Jaya Misra; Anuja Gondhalekar; Bradley Fernandes	30 August 2020
Kainargues with him and tells him that she quit but she will not let this go. Kainaat defames United India and Sufiyaan is told to sort the matter after the news gets viral on Twitter. She gets an interview who later happens to be Sufiyaan and he makes her an offer to join United India which she rejects. Imtiaz Alqaazi is Sufiyaan's best friend and are like brothers. Imtiaz is in Africa and is soon returning home with a ‘surprise’ and the family think he is bringing a girl. Rahil, Sufiyaan's brother meets Kainaat's sisters, Harleen and Falak in college. Falak is instantly attracted to him. At the same time, Rahil and Hamid along with their friends have started working on their plan to leak the mathematics paper from Kainaat's father who is the college professor.
3	"Mushaira ki Raat"	Muzammil Desai	Jaya Misra; Anuja Gondhalekar; Bradley Fernandes	30 August 2020
Kainaat drops her father at Sufiyaan's house for a mushaira night but ends up alone on the road after her cab breaks down. At the house party, Adil flirts with his girlfriend which Sufiyaan sees and intervenes after seeing his stepmother's upset reaction. Sufiyaan's mother gets emotional seeing Sufi alone in the party and wishes him to find a girl who will fill his life with love and make him believe in it which he hates. While going through her tweets, Kainaat realises that the person who rejected her job profile was Sufiyaan's friend and she again defames him on Twitter which Sufiyaan sees. Sufiyaan eventually locates Kainaat and asks her to get into his car.
4	"When fire meets Ice"	Muzammil Desai	Jaya Misra; Anuja Gondhalekar; Bradley Fernandes	30 August 2020
Kainaat and Sufi have another argument in the car and when he orders her to apologise she refuses so he tells her to get out. Kainaat is eve teased by Rahil's friends when she is out on the road alone with Pesky. Someone rescues her and it is Imtiaz who is introduced and has returned from Africa. He offers her a lift and they become friends. When Kainaat tells him she lost her job, he offers her one and takes her to his and Sufi's home where she learns that Sufiyaan and Imtiaz are best friends, running the company together. She is mistaken by the family members to be his girlfriend. When Sufi tells his dad and Farhad that she defamed their company she maturely handles the situation. She accepts Imtiaz's job offer when Sufi irritates her. They both challenge each other.
5	"Naach na aave aagan tedha"	Muzammil Desai	Jaya Misra; Anuja Gondhalekar; Bradley Fernandes	30 August 2020
Kainaat joins United India and Imtiaz finds himself in a troublesome position where he can neither take Kainaat's side nor be against her. Meanwhile, Rahil and Hamid hack Professor Indrapreet Sahani's laptop to steal the examination papers. Sufiyaan tries to ruin Kainaat's first day but fails. He warns Imi not to trust Kainaat. Kainaat learns that the boys who eve-teased her were Rahil's friends and confronts Sufiyaan on letting them walk out of the jail. She later realizes that Sufi was unaware of what had happened while Sufi rebukes the boys leaving Rahil angry at Kainaat and swearing to take revenge from her family for what she did, especially by troubling her sisters who study with him. Kainaat begins to see Sufi's nice side but she is unable to understand who he truly is as he has a split personality.
6	"Breaking news"	Muzammil Desai	Jaya Misra; Anuja Gondhalekar; Bradley Fernandes	30 August 2020
Kainaat tries to thank Sufi for last night but it ends up in another argument. Sufi doesn't like seeing Imi and Kainaat together. Sufi gives Kainaat's story to another journalist and send her to cover a story on a new salon's launch. Kainaat gets it to be breaking new while Sufi tells her that he is going to be broadcasting her father's story. On learning that her father is accused of leaking mathematics examination papers and taking bribe, Kainaat requests Sufiyaan and Imtiaz for some time to clear it out but by the time she reaches home, the story has already been played on the TV by United India.
7	"Hate Story"	Muzammil Desai	Jaya Misra; Anuja Gondhalekar; Bradley Fernandes	30 August 2020
Kainaat gets her hacker friend's help and reveals that the money was transferred by Hamid and Rahil was the mastermind behind the plan. Sufiyaan, Imitiaz and family are taken aback. Sufi and Imitiaz go to her house and requests her to get her father to withdraw his case as it could affect Rahil and Hamid's career but Kainaat refuses to state that even she had begged Imitiaz not to let Sufi publish the story till she could sort out the matter. Later her father goes to Sufi and Imitiaz's house and tells the family that he is withdrawing the case. Sufi apologizes to Kainaat after which she leaves Pesky, her mother's dog, with him to awaken his emotions. After this incident, Dana is upset that Rahil caused Hamid to be drawn into his mischief and asks Farhad to divide the company and property and live their individual lives.
8	"Batwaara Dilon Ka"	Muzammil Desai	Jaya Misra; Anuja Gondhalekar; Bradley Fernandes	30 August 2020
Dana is happy that her dream has come true of the families split. Rashida prays to Allah to unite the families. Sufiyaan is still angry at Rahil. He overhears Kainaat praying to God for Tahira at the mosque and realises that Tahira is a cancer patient with a fragile life. Sufiyaan shares his emotions with Pesky while on the other hand Imitiaz is disturbed that Kainaat is angry with him. Dana stops Adil and Farhad from dissolving their partnership as she learns that Farhad is giving away 70% of the company to Adil. Sufi later has a nightmare of Imtiaz and Kainaat getting close but he is not sure if his problem is that he has fallen for Kainaat or that she is not right for Imitiaz. It is also revealed that Hamid is gay and is secretly in love with Rahil.
9	"Chemistry, biology OR warfare"	Muzammil Desai	Jaya Misra; Anuja Gondhalekar; Bradley Fernandes	2 September 2020
Kainaat learns that Pesky is more connected to Sufiyaan and refuses to be back with Kainaat. Imtiaz who is due to go back to Africa decides to stay back when he realises he likes Kainaat. Imtiaz also apologizes to Kainaat for her family's ordeal because of United India and decides to take her to the debutant ball. Sufi realizes that he feels something for Kainaat and wants to ask her to accompany him to the ball but Imitaz enters and asks her which she refuses at first as she doesn't like big parties but she later accepts after hearing Sufi talking bad about her. Rahil and Harleen work on a project together and he uses this opportunity for her to fall for him. In the end, Sufiyaan tells Kainaat not to hurt Imtiaz and she calls him out on his behaviour. Sufi tells her he doesn't trust girls and they nearly kiss in the Xerox room but she flees.
10	"Beauty and the Beast"	Muzammil Desai	Jaya Misra; Anuja Gondhalekar; Bradley Fernandes	2 September 2020
This is the night of the Debutant Ball, where Sufiyaan goes with Laila, one of his flings, Imtiaz goes with Kainaat and Rahil enters with Falak and Harleen trying to create problems between them. Sufiyaan makes Kainaat jealous with Laila and they ignore each other in the party but Sufiyaan forcibly dances with her. Kainaat and Sufiyaan call each other a beast to Imitiaz. Confronting Kainaat, Sufiyaan and she have an argument and she reveals she has a soft corner for him and they secretly kiss and make out but she runs away feeling embarrassed. On the other, Imtiaz realises his love for Kainaat with the help of Farah and reveals it to a shocked Kainaat.
11	"Wounded Love"	Muzammil Desai	Jaya Misra; Anuja Gondhalekar; Bradley Fernandes	12 October 2020
Kainaat and Sufiyaan are unable to forget about what happened between them last night. It is revealed that Imtiaz ‘lied’ to Kainaat about his love and pretends that his friend is in love with someone and he is trying to help him. He enlists Kainaat's help with the proposal lines; with Imi hoping he can propose Kainaat by using her own advice. Kainaat's younger brother, Dilsher, who has been away from home all this while, reappears. Rahil flirts with Falak. Imitiaz plans to reveal his feelings to Kainaat whilst they are on a coffee date, Rahil finds this out and informs his Sufiyaan which angers him and he gets drunk and goes to the cafe and humiliates Kainaat thinking she is doing the exact same thing which his aunt did. Kainaat retaliates that whatever he said is right and that if she ever chose to marry a rich man it would be Imtiaz. She leaves angrily.
12	"Smile Please"	Muzammil Desai	Jaya Misra; Anuja Gondhalekar; Bradley Fernandes	12 October 2020
Kainaat finds Sufiyaan at her doorstep, drunk and broken and he reveals his past trauma of witnessing his father cheating on his mother with his aunt. Kainaat begins to see another side to him. The next day, Sufi regrets telling Kainaat about his past and misunderstands Kainaat as he thinks she told everyone about his secret and again he humiliates her but realises the truth soon after and apologises. He tells Kainaat he's willing to compensate as an apology by offering her a better position in the company but she tells him she just wants to see him smile for once as he never does. Sufi spends the day trying to smile but embarrasses himself in front of his colleagues. He witnesses Imi and Kainaat ‘professing their love’ but Kainaat is only helping Imi with his ‘friend's proposal’. Kainaat tells Sufi the truth about her and Imi which makes him happy. They both then realise they have feelings for one another and they become intimate.
13	"Mills and Moon"	Muzammil Desai	Jaya Misra; Anuja Gondhalekar; Bradley Fernandes	12 October 2020
Sufi and Kainaat are now in a secret relationship and Imi invites her to the Eid party. Rahil also invites Falak and Harleen as part of his plan. Sufiyan celebrates Eid for the first time in years since his trauma which shocks everyone but are proud of him. Rahil's friend misbehaves with Kainaat and he is beaten up by Sufi. Rahil calls Kainaat a ‘worker’ which gets Sufi defensive over her and he rebukes Rahil asking him to apologise to Kainaat. Imtiaz tells Dana of his feelings for Kainaat and she's not happy. She later witnesses Sufi and Kainaat hugging and smiles evilly. She uses this situation and has now found her weapon (Kainaat) to separate both best friends and both families for good.
14	"Riots and Roses"	Muzammil Desai	Jaya Misra; Anuja Gondhalekar; Bradley Fernandes	12 October 2020
Imtiaz and Sufiyan both find out they are in love with a girl but don't reveal it's Kainaat. Dana plans Imtiaz and Kainaat's engagement secretly with Rashida's help. They inform Tahira about Kainaat and Imi and she is happy. She tells Kainaat a proposal came from her boss's home and Kainaat misunderstands it to be Sufi's proposal and she's happy. Tahira suffers a heart attack and Kainaat rushes to her but they are stuck in a middle of a riot and are saved by Sufiyan who takes them to the hospital. The doctor who treats Tahira isn't available as it is his wedding and Sufi goes to stops it and tells the doctor to save his girlfriends' mother's life as he loves her a lot and can't see her upset. The doctor agrees. Seeing Sufi's gesture, Kainaat asks him to marry her and he happily accepts.
15	"LSD - Love Shaadi Aur Dhoka"	Muzammil Desai	Jaya Misra; Anuja Gondhalekar; Bradley Fernandes	12 October 2020
The next few days, the family witness Sufi's changed behaviour as he's now smiling and happy. Dana tells Imi that she is planning his wedding with Kainaat and he's happy but goes to Kainaat and asks if she agrees to the marriage but Kainaat thinks he's asking for Sufi and she accepts. Rahil plays a double game and tells Harleen he likes her only not Falak. Dana, Rashida and Hamid go to the Sahanis to finalise the proposal. There is an instant attraction between Hamid and Dilsher. Sufi and Kainaat meet up at his home whilst the family are away and he takes her to his room and they become intimate. Dana reveals her plan and plans to make a big explosion as when the truth comes out of Sufi-Kai-Imi. It will be one big blast which will permanently separate Alqaazis-Abdullahs.
16	"Room service"	Muzammil Desai	Jaya Misra; Anuja Gondhalekar; Bradley Fernandes	11 December 2020
Sufi and Kainaat have been even closer and she ends up spending the night in his house and having an awkward run-in with the family but they are saved. Rahil sees Sufi and Kainaat together and plots to separate them as he hates Kainaat. Dana reveals Imi and Kainaat's wedding to the family including Sufiyaan who believes Dana has misunderstood. Imi plans to propose to Kainaat properly believing that the Sahani's have already accepted the proposal as told by Dana. He informs Rahil he will be taking Kainaat to a hotel to propose. Rahil informs Sufi about this and reveals Kainaat is two-timing him and Imi but Sufi doesn't believe him. Rahil tells him the hotel name in which Imi and Kai are. There, Imi and Kai meet up and Kai thinks Imi loves someone else and therefore asking advice. Imi finally reveals to Kai he loves her. He also bends down with a ring which is seen by an angry Sufi who accuses Kainaat. He abuses her and calls her a gold-digger and a w**** but before she could defend herself she slaps him, owing no explanation to him. Imi understands the relation between Sufi-Kai. Sufi throws money at Kainaat and tells her this is payment for the night they spent together.
17	"Hear No Evil, See No Evil, Say No Evil"	Muzammil Desai	Jaya Misra; Anuja Gondhalekar; Bradley Fernandes	11 December 2020
The trio are shattered after what happened and they break down each having lost their love. Kainaat tries to inform her family that they have misunderstood the wedding proposal but she stops after seeing how happy her mother is with the wedding. On the other hand, Imi is trying to do the same but Dana goes ahead with the preparations. Imi tries to talk to Sufi and tells him that he has misunderstood Kainaat but Sufi is believing Kai used both of them. Imi talks to Kai about her feelings for him and Sufi. He is hurt when Kainaat says she never thought of him as more than a friend but she tells him any girl would be lucky to have him. Sufi is unable to forget about Kainaat especially as he is looking after her dog, Pesky whom he has grown close to for weeks. Dilsher and Hamid hook up. Rahil sees Kainaat at a bar, drunk and sends a video to Sufi who appears and walks away with Kainaat's friend. Falak reveals to Kainaat she is pregnant.
18	"Father's Day Out"	Muzammil Desai	Jaya Misra; Anuja Gondhalekar; Bradley Fernandes	11 December 2020
Imi and Kainaat have informed their family the engagement is off. Kainaat finds out Rahil is the father of Falak's child and also he is having an affair with Harleen. Rahil invites Harleen at his home to spend the night for his birthday but they are interrupted by Kainaat and Falak and they inform Harleen the truth. Kainaat slaps Rahil and blames him for playing with her sisters. Rahil tries to play innocent. Kainaat goes to speak with Sufi for Rahil and Falak's matter and she tells him to sort it. Sufi tells Rahil to own up and be responsible. Falak doesn't want an abortion after she is ordered to do so by Kainaat and Sufi. Rahil asks Falak to marry him seeing no way out and she accepts. Tahira and Benazir are not happy with the relation. Everyone except Tahira, Indrapreet and Dilsher are aware of Falak's pregnancy. Rahil tells Hamid to help him get out of this engagement and he agrees.
19	"Let there be drama"	Muzammil Desai	Jaya Misra; Anuja Gondhalekar; Bradley Fernandes	11 December 2020
Alqaazis and Abdullahs visit the Sahanis to finalise Rahil and Falak's engagement. Over there, Sufi follows Kainaat and asks her why she went to him regarding Rahil and Falak instead of Imi. He asks if she loves him or Imi and Kainaat reveals she still loves him but also hates him. Rahil secretly visits Harleen in her room and fakes that he loves her only and Falak is lying about the paternity. Falak nearly catches Dilsher and Hamid together. Rahil and Falak give their consent to marry each other. Later when the families have gone home, Sufi sneaks in Kainaat's room and shares his childhood pain and reveals he hated the word love and neither believed in it until he met her. Later, Rahil and Hamid begin their plan to end the engagement and they make it as if Falak is two-timing Rahil and Hamid. Sufi sees Hamid and Falak together and when he questions Hamid about it at home he reveals Falak is two-timing and he may be the father of her child. He shows ‘proof’ of Falak's nature. Hamid tells Sufi that both sisters (Kainaat and Falak) are the same and not to trust them. Sufi is determined to find out the truth.
20	"Dangerous liaisons"	Muzammil Desai	Jaya Misra; Anuja Gondhalekar; Bradley Fernandes	11 December 2020
It is the day of Falak and Rahil's engagement and Rahil is determined that the wedding won't happen. Harleen gets drunk as she can't stand seeing her lover and sister together. Sufi arrives and shows everyone the fake proof (Rahil and Hamid's plan) of Falak's lies and reveals she is a two timer who is also having an affair with Hamid. Hamid lies to everyone and stands with Sufi which makes Dilsher furious. Falak tries to prove her innocence and Kainaat defends her sister and gets angry on Sufi. Sufi humiliates and embarrasses the Sahanis. Benazir also humiliates them whilst Dana and Imi defend the Sahanis. Sufi also reveals Falak's pregnancy to her parents which makes Tahira collapse and she is taken to hospital. Dana tells Kainaat to choose the man who loves her and for her mothers sake who could die anytime. In the end, Kainaat tells Imi she is broken and shattered and wants peace in her life. She proposes to Imi for her mothers sake and he later accepts.
21	"Once a mistake, Twice a habit"	Muzammil Desai	Jaya Misra; Anuja Gondhalekar; Bradley Fernandes	11 December 2020
Sufi turns to alcohol believing Kainaat is a betrayer. He believes Rahil and Hamid lies about Kainaat and Falak. When he gets home, Rahil reveals the preparations of Imi-Kai's wedding is going on and Kai was the one that proposed which shocks Sufiyaan and he ends up having a massive showdown with Imi which shocks the family. Sufi waits outside the Sahanis which Kainaat sees. She is also sad but seeing how Sufi behaved goes to him bringing a dress which Sufi gave her whilst they were dating (to wear after their marriage) and she burns it in front of him but Sufi manages to save it but in the process burns his hand.
22	"Friend-Conquest"	Muzammil Desai	Jaya Misra; Anuja Gondhalekar; Bradley Fernandes	11 December 2020
Adil gives tickets for Spain to Sufi so he could stay away from the wedding in case he causes trouble but Sufi tears it. Imi and Kainaat's haldi ceremony begins and Dana makes Sufi apply it to Imi. She sends a haldi plate to a servant to give to the Sahanis but Sufi secretly takes it instead. He arrives at Kainaat's haldi function and Tahira is nervous. Sufi reveals that a member of the grooms family has to apply haldi to the bride and so he came. He applies haldi to a nervous Kainaat and he purposely touches her lips whilst applying which makes her feel disgusted. Sufi calls her a gold digger and says her, Dana and Benazir are the same however she argues back and Tahira sends him away. As he's leaving, Sufi and Kainaat cry. The sangeet ceremony is going on and Sufi appears with a mysterious girl who is revealed to be Imi's ex girlfriend and is hooking up with Sufi. Sufi causes a scene in the function.
23	"Wedding Breaker"	Muzammil Desai	Jaya Misra; Anuja Gondhalekar; Bradley Fernandes	11 December 2020
Sufi spends the night with Imi's ex girlfriend, Nazia in order to forget about Kainaat. He returns home and humiliates Adil who loses his temper and Sufi is sent away. Imi goes to Sufi and tells him he will always be his best friend and asks him to be his best man at his wedding but Sufi refuses. Imitiaz and Kainaat's wedding day arrives. Hamid regrets what he did and calls Dilsher and reveals the truth but Harleen overhears instead and she demands Hamid to tell Sufiyaan that Rahil is to blame. Hamid and Harleen reveal the entire truth to Sufi and he slaps Hamid. Sufi goes to Rahil and beats him up for what he did. As she is waiting for the molvi, Sufi appears in front of Kainaat.
24	"Wedding bells gone wrong"	Muzammil Desai	Jaya Misra; Anuja Gondhalekar; Bradley Fernandes	11 December 2020
Having realised his mistake, Sufi seeks forgiveness from Kai. However, Kainaat is not willing to forgive him and calls his love as ‘emotional abuse’ but Sufi apologises for his actions and he asks her to marry him and brings the dress he gave her which he saved from burning. He tells her that they are one soul no one can separate them and forcefully grabs her to get married. Imtiaz appears and he tells Kainaat he'll stop their wedding and asks her to choose whoever she wants and he won't mind. As he's leaving, Kainaat stops him and she turns to Sufi saying their love had lots of passion but sometimes his love turns into insanity and she can't forgive him and right now she wants peace and comfort and she can only rely on Imi who has stood by her and her family's side the whole time. She further tells Sufi that their love had madness but no respect and he has never trusted her and his love burns her - if she chose him she would think low of herself. She chooses Imi and they start the wedding chants with a shattered Sufi looking on. The wedding is complete and Kainaat finally arrives in her new home as Mrs Alqaazi. In the end, Sufiyaan breaks down.
25	"Shaadi Mubarak"	Muzammil Desai	Jaya Misra; Anuja Gondhalekar; Bradley Fernandes	11 December 2020
Imi and Kai decide to maintain a distance between them so it is not awkward. Kainaat is worried for Sufi when she hears him breaking things in his room in the middle of the night. The following morning, Sufi appears in the newlyweds room whilst Imi is not there. He flirts with Kainaat and she tells him she doesn't feel anything for him and now he needs to accept that she is Mrs Alqaazi now. Sufi tells her she can't become someone's wife just by accepting the wedding and that she is only his. He becomes obsessed with drinking and ruining Imi-Kai's relationship. Sufi creates a scene on the dining table and Farhad is angry and tells Adil to sort his son out. Dana is happy that best friends have started arguing. Sufi is still angry at Rahil who tells him that Imi is the traitor as he married the girl his best friend loved and betrayed him. Imi and Kainaat prepare for their honeymoon. Rashida is worried for Sufi and she tells Kainaat to meet Sufi once and to get him to quit drinking. Kainaat goes to meet him at the place where they used to often meet when they were dating.
26	"Shaadi ke side effects"	Muzammil Desai	Jaya Misra; Anuja Gondhalekar; Bradley Fernandes	11 December 2020
Kainaat and Sufiyaan remember their past moments at the place where they used to hang out. Sufi waits for her and reveals he knew she'd come. Kainaat tells him she's going on honeymoon which Sufi replies he'll follow her and he'll only stop drinking if she meets him every 24 hours. Kainaat brings a drunk Sufi home which the family see and Farhad gets angry but Imi tells him he sent Kainaat to Sufi. Farhad tells Adil to keep Sufiyaan away from his daughter in law as she is Imi's wife now but Adil blames Kainaat for Sufi's behaviour. Dana manipulates Farhad against Adil and Sufi. Sufi tells Imi he wants Kainaat back and calls Imi a cheat and a betrayer as he knew about his love for Kainaat but still married her. Imi and Kai arrive at their honeymoon suite and they begin to spend a lot of time together. Sufi grows obsessed with following them to their honeymoon.
27	"Ski fall"	Muzammil Desai	Jaya Misra; Anuja Gondhalekar; Bradley Fernandes	11 December 2020
Sufi stalks the newlywed couple on the honeymoon. Kainaat finds herself trapped with Sufiyaan as he separates Imi from Kainaat. She gets furious and orders him to stop following them. Imi and Sufi challenge each other; if Sufi wins he gets 5 minutes with Kai and if Imi wins, Sufi has to go home. Kainaat is angry to see both brothers behaving like kids. Sufi cheats and goes to Kainaat where he expresses his emotions and tells her what they had was full of madness and passion and not ordinary like what she and Imi have. He tells her he'll wait for her to realise how she truly feels; Kainaat replies by kissing Imtiaz in front of him. But Sufiyaan doesn't react as now he knows his words affected Kainaat and she is ignoring what she feels. He believes Kainaat still loves him. The newlywed honeymoon is cut short because of Sufi and they return home. When the parents find out Sufi followed them, Farhad and Dana tell Adil that Sufi is acting out of control and is obsessive. Falak contacts Hamid and asks where Rahil is as Harleen is missing. Andy hears the conversation and informs Dana. Kainaat tells Sufi that Imi was once his brother and to have shame when he talks bad about Imi but Sufiyaan says he's not his brother but a b******.
28	"Gossips and Scandals"	Muzammil Desai	Jaya Misra; Anuja Gondhalekar; Bradley Fernandes	11 December 2020
Imi grows frustrated with Nazia (who is Farah's friend and has been living with Alqaazis-Abdullahs for some days) when she flirts with him. Farah intervenes and tells Imi they are exes and to get over it. Kainaat and Imi further get closer. Rahil and Harleen continue their hookups but Hamid and Falak arrive and Falak orders Harleen to return home as their parents are worried but she walks away feeling disgusted when Rahil ‘professes his love’ for Harleen. Rahil cusses Hamid and calls him gay and Dana overhears this and is shocked about her son's sexual status. She vows to keep this a secret so Hamid doesn't get humiliated. United India find out that fake allegations are being made against Farhad by an employee of United. Alqaazis are shocked with the news and Imi is upset to see his father in a state. He seeks Sufiyaan's help as he has all the data and information of United's employees. Sufi agrees on one condition; Kainaat has to call him and request help herself. However, Imi decides to investigate independently along with Hamid and they discover who made the allegations. They go to the woman who reveals it was Sufiyaan that told her to do this. Hamid believes the girl and blames Sufi whilst Imi believes Sufi.
29	"Divide and Rule"	Muzammil Desai	Jaya Misra; Anuja Gondhalekar; Bradley Fernandes	11 December 2020
Imi and Hamid return home and Hamid reveals what the girl said which makes Dana angry and the whole family gather around to question Sufi. Sufi denies being responsible and says Farhad is like his father more than Adil and he can never do this. Dana doesn't believe him especially with how he has been reacting lately. Rahil defends his brother and they both accuse Alqaazis of always blaming the Abdullahs. Imi is hurt listening them saying ‘two families’ when they were all one big family. Hamid and Rahil fight regarding the situation. Sufi instead blames Imi of making up the story to embarrass Sufi. Farhad gets angry and blames Sufi and tells him Imi believed him yet he stayed quiet. Adil intervenes and defends Sufi. This major tiff causes the two families to split and live their own lives. Sufi is hurt when Kainaat defends Imi and her in laws and she calls him out on his behaviour when he talks bad about Imi. Sufi promises that he will cause destruction and will destroy Imtiaz. It is revealed that the person that caused all this is Nazia and she ordered the girl who made the accusation. Falak and Harleen have a major clash regarding Rahil which infuriates Tahira. Dana appears and asks for Falak's hand in marriage to Hamid and tells that Hamid feels guilty with what he did on the engagement. The Alqaazi and Abdullah men have an important contract and they compete fairly but Abdullahs win the case. Imi congratulates Sufi who tells him there is a celebration party and invites Imi and Kainaat.
30	"Sealed with a Kiss"	Muzammil Desai	Jaya Misra; Anuja Gondhalekar; Bradley Fernandes	11 December 2020
Imi and Kainaat go to the party which she doesn't want to go to especially after they lost the contract and also with Sufiyaan's behaviour towards them. However, Imi says he's proud of Sufi as he's gotten even successful and he's happy for him. Kainaat is not happy as Sufi is the exact opposite of Imi who is kind and supportive and Sufi doesn't deserve any kindness. Rahil ignores Harleen in the party to flirt with girls. Sufi flirts with Kainaat and calls Imi a loser to her and that he was the best guy for her. He touches her inappropriately which Imi witnesses and feels hurt and jealous. Kai leaves with Imi and she can sense how that incident affected him and feels guilty. When they arrive home they have an emotional conversation where Imi tells her that she and Sufi looked good together and that Sufi really loves her. He tells Kainaat she can leave the marriage as he wants her to be happy. Kainaat gets emotional hearing this and she tells Imi she regrets keeping the distance between them and she is lucky to have a husband like him. Realising her true feelings she kisses him and they consummate their marriage. She finally reveals to Imi she loves him. In the party, Rashida can sense how sad Sufi is and she can see that Sufi truly loves Kai but his ways of showing his love is wrong. Sufi admits his success and fame doesn't make him happy as only Kainaat does. Rashida advises him to tell Kainaat how he truly feels and tells him not to insult her or her husband. He takes this advice and happily goes back to the mansion but when he arrives in Imi and Kai's room he gets the massive shock of his life; seeing Kai and Imi in bed together. He is deeply hurt and his anger causes him to burn their bed.
31	"Do or Die"	Muzammil Desai	Jaya Misra; Anuja Gondhalekar; Bradley Fernandes	11 December 2020
Sufi continues to burn the couple's bed which they slept together in showing his furious anger. Kainaat glares at him sharply which clearly shows she has lost everything she ever felt for him and has moved on. Imi tries to put out the fire. The family arrive in the room and are shocked by what Sufi did. They all try to stop the fire and they get Sufi out of the room. Kainaat is furious on Sufiyaan to which he says how she could sleep with a loser like him. Kainaat angrily says Imitiaz is her husband and she asks what happened to the Sufi she used to know. Sufi is wrecked and he leaves the house, gets drunk and sleeps next to a garbage. He admits even though he grew more successful he felt like the biggest loser. Imitiaz is leaving for a business trip and Kainaat and Farhad force him to go as he decided against it after what occurred. The new couple spend romantic moments together and now they are finally happy. Imtiaz and Kainaat talk on the phone whilst he is driving but suddenly a truck hits him and his car flips over and he lands at the bottom of a cliff badly injured. Kainaat shockingly hears this over the phone. The family rush Imi to the hospital and everyone breaks down. Kainaat goes into shock and is deeply heartbroken and recalls her moments with Imi. The police inform Kai that the accident wasn't accidental but intentional. Kainaat recalls Sufi's words of finishing off Imi and causing destruction. The scene then shifts to Imi's funeral which shows he died. Sufi appears and the family are crying. Sufi tells a shocked Rashida, Imi deserved to die and that no one has any proof to what he did. In the end, Kainaat looks at Sufi angrily which shows that she believes Sufi is responsible for Imi's death and she will get revenge...

== Soundtrack ==
Bebaakee

Soundtrack album
- Recorded: 2020
- Genre: Web series soundtrack
- Length: 20:40
- Label: ALT Entertainment
- Producers: Ekta Kapoor, Shobha Kapoor

Track list
No.	Title	Music	Singer(s)	Length
1.	"Galliyan"	Akhil Sachdeva	Akhil Sachdeva; Asees Kaur	4:44
2.	"Intehaan"	Gaurav Guleria	Gaurav Guleria	3:50
3.	"Rabba Khair Kari (Female version)"	Digvijay	Richa Sharma	3:52
4.	"Rabba Khair Kari (Male version)"	Digvijay	Digvijay Singh Pariyar	4:09
5.	"Aakhiri Baar"	Darshan-Umang	Mohammed Irfan; Palak Muchhal	4:05
Total length:				20:40

The music of the film was composed by various composers, and the lyrics were written by Rashmi Virag. The background music was composed by Chandan Saxena. Vocals were arranged by Shriya Chopra.

== Release ==
Bebaakee premiered through ZEE5 and Alt Balaji on 30 August 2020.

== See also ==
- ALTBalaji original programming
