= Siddhanth (TV series) =

Indian television series

- Starring: Pawan Shankar
- Original language: Hindi
- No. of episodes: 50

Production
- Producer: Anurradha Prasad
- Production company: BAG Films

Original release
- Network: Star One
- Release: 1 December 2004 – 9 November 2005

Siddhanth (also spelled Siddhant, transl. Principle) is an Indian TV show starring Pawan Shankar in the title role, broadcast on the now defunct Star One channel from 1 December 2004 – 9 November 2005. It was produced by Anurradha Prasad (BAG films) and was nominated for an International Emmy Award.

== Cast ==
- Pawan Shankar as Advocate Siddhant Mehra
- Suhita Thatte as Mrs Deshpande (Siddhant's landlady)
- Tasneem Sheikh as Shruti Saxena
- Sai Deodhar as Journalist Hemangi Mathur
- Ashwini Kalsekar as ACP Netra Menon
- Pooja Ghai Rawal as Anamika Arekar
- Ravee Gupta as Navya, Siddhant's assistant
- Tom Alter as Mr. Arekar
- Gaurav Khanna as Tanmay Bakshi
- Shishir Sharma as Home Minister Saxena
- Keerti Gaekwad Kelkar as Deepa
- Bakul Thakkar as Advocate Anand
- Sujata Sehgal
- Arun Bali as Mr. Qureshi
- Bobby Parvez
- Nasirr Khan as Advocate
- Rajiv Kumar
- Murli Sharma as Advocate
- Aasif Sheikh
