= Metro Gold =

- Country: India
- Headquarters: New Delhi, Delhi, India

Programming
- Language(s): Hindi

Ownership
- Owner: Doordarshan and Nine Network

History
- Launched: 8 September 2000; 24 years ago
- Closed: 11 September 2001; 23 years ago

Availability

Terrestrial
- Analogue: VHF band

Metro Gold, also known as 9 Gold, was a Hindi-language terrestrial television channel in India. The channel was a joint venture of both DD Metro and Nine Gold of Kerry Packer and Vinay Maloo of HFCL – Nine Broadcasting India; hence known as Metro Gold. During its first launch, the channel was more likely known as DD Metro channel's "primetime block" from 7 pm to 10 pm IST, where it showed its programmes only in the given three-hour span on DD Metro Channel. But when the programmes started becoming popular in the primetime slot, DD Metro tried to set up some realistic terms with Nine Gold, which created disagreement between the companies and led up the channel's closing.

Metro Gold's programming was targeted at family audiences, and covered genres including drama, comedy, horror, and live events. Among its most successful programmes are Maan, Kabhi Sautan Kabhi Saheli, Dushman, Mamla Gadbad Hai, Saamne Wali Khidki, Tede Medhe Sapnay, and Chonch Ladi Re Chonch.

After Metro Gold went off-air, it signed a contract with STAR Plus and sold off all of their shows to the channel. STAR Plus bought Nine Gold's entire library of programmes after signing the deal, and all of the programmes were re-aired on STAR Plus from the beginning. Besides, all of Metro Gold's programmes now belong to (are claimed by) STAR Plus and known as theirs rather than DD Metro's, though they were aired on DD Metro channel. The reason was that HFCL – Nine Gold paid DD Metro 1.21 million rupees for the three hours of air-time on DD Metro and they had full claim and the right to sell their programmes to anyone, and when they signed a deal with STAR Plus, DD Metro had no say in it.

== Programmes ==
The following is a list of programmes that were broadcast by Metro Gold Channel at the time it was on-air (now the programmes belong to STAR Plus channel):

Drama

- Dushman (Mon-Thu | 08:00PM)
- Piyaa Binaa (Mon | 08:30PM)
- Kundali (Tue | 08:30PM)
- Kavita (Wed | 09:00PM, Later Moved to Wed | 08:30PM)
- Smriti (Tue | 09:00PM, Later Moved to Thu | 08:30PM)
- Maan (Mon-Thu | 09:00PM)
- Kabhii Sautan Kabhii Sahelii (Mon-Thu | 09:30PM)
- Jannat (Sat-Sun | 09:00PM)
- Kuch Ret Kuch Paani (Wed | 09:30PM)
- Alag Alag (Thu | 08:30PM)
- Hum Bhi To Hain Tumhare (Fri | 8:00PM, Later Moved to Fri | 09:30PM)
- Nargis (Fri | 8:30PM)
- Patang (Tue | 09:30PM)

Comedy

- Eena Meena Deeka (Thu | 07:30PM)
- Jaaneman Jaaneman (Tue | 07:30PM)
- Mooch Nahi Toh Kuch Nahi (Tue | 07:00PM)
- Saamne Wali Khidki (Wed | 07:30PM)
- Shaadi No. 1 (Sun | 08:00PM)
- Chonch Ladi Re Chonch (Sun | 08:30PM)
- Tedhe Medhe Sapnay (Sun | 09:00PM)
- Hum Hain Kal Aaj Aur Kal (Sun | 09:30PM)
- Zindagi Milke Bitayenge (Wed | 08:30PM)
- Mamla Gadbad Hai (Fri | 7:30PM)
- Meri Mrs. Chanchala (Mon | 7:30PM)

Shows

- Bol Baby Bol (Mon | 07:00PM), Hosted by Manoj Pahwa
- Taal Maal Ka Sawaal (Fri | 7:00PM), Hosted by Singer Shaan
- Superstars (Mon | 09:00PM, Later Moved to Mon | 07:00PM), Hosted by Chunky Panday
- Hum Tum Ek Camare Mei Band Hoon (Wed-Thu | 07:00PM, Later Thu | 07:00PM), Hosted by Parzaan Dastur
- Yehi Hai Right Price (The Price is Right) (Thu | 09:00PM), Hosted by Ronit Roy
- Mini Superstars (Fri | 07:00PM), Hosted by Raageshwari Loomba
- Bollywood for You (Sat | 7:00PM)
- Blockbuster (Sat | 9:30PM, Later Moved to Sat | 7:30PM)
- Superhit Muqabla (Sun | 7:00PM)

Action

- Khaaki (Fri | 9:00PM)

Concerts

- Madhuri Magic (Sun | 08:00PM)
- The Helen Show (Sun | 08:00PM)
- Anandji's Little Stars Concert (Sun | 08:00PM)
- Patriotic Concert (Sun | 08:00PM)

Movie Blocks

- Directors Cut (Sat | 08:00PM)
  - Hare Kkanch Ki Choodiyaan
  - Ghoondhat ke Pat Khol
  - Mr. Mehmaan
  - Jannat Talkies
  - Jaal
  - Dil Ne Suna
  - Keh Do Na
- Kids Box Office (Sun | 08:00PM)
