= The Kutumb Foundation =

The Kutumb Foundation is a New Delhi–based NGO. It was founded in 2003. Kutumb is a nonprofit working to help disadvantaged young people empower themselves across Delhi NCR and India. They are committed to promoting the arts and the joy of learning through free library, storytelling, and literacy programming, as well as through capacity building workshops for organisations and educators, cultural programming, and life-skills based football programming; they do this using immersive theatre and drama tools.

Kutumb believes in the critical importance of providing supportive learning environments for children and youth to develop into independent, creative, and empathetic critical thinkers, ready to confidently ask questions of themselves and the world around them, and reach their own conclusions. Kutumb's peer leaders are committed to applying what they have learned to their communities and working towards the need for a more compassionate, equitable, plural, and diverse future.
