= India's Best Cinestars Ki Khoj =

Indian television series

- Presented by: Season 1: Roshan Abbas; Malaika Arora; Season 2: Aman Verma; Season 3: Hussain Kuwajerwala; Vishal Malhotra; Season 4: Asha Negi
- Judges: Season 1: Mahesh Manjrekar; Satish Kaushik; Ken Ghosh; Season 2: Anupam Kher; Pooja Bhatt; Madhur Bhandarkar; Season 3: Vijay Krishna Acharya; Anurag Basu; Sonali Bendre
- Country of origin: India

Production
- Running time: 70 Minutes

Original release
- Network: Zee TV

India's Best Cinestar Ki Khoj is an Indian television series that premiered on Zee TV in 2004. The first season of the stage show was directed by Gajendra Singh while the reality episodes were directed by Ramon Chibb and Siddharth Bahuguna. The show in its first season had Sudhir Mishra and Vivek Vaswani as mentors to the budding talent. It is a talent show for aspiring actors, and the first prize is the lead role in a film. Two winners, one male and one female, are crowned at the finale. The show returned for its second season in 2006 and a third one in 2014.

== Season 1 ==
The winners of the first season were Sarwar Ahuja and Aditi Sharma.

Aditi Sharma	Lucknow
Sarwar Ahuja	Hyderabad
Amruta Khanvilkar	Pune
Yuvika Chaudhary	Delhi
Nivaan Sen	Varanasi
Abhinav Kohli	Bengaluru
Abhishek Avasthi	Kanpur
Ashok Saharan	Jaipur
Bhaumik Sampat	Rajkot
Preeti Amin	Hyderabad
Himanshu Malhotra	Varanasi
Peyush Dixit	Jodhpur
Sudeepa Singh	Ludhiana
Vipul Roy	Bhopal
Sharad Malhotra	Kolkata
Manmeet Jaggi	Bhopal
Ankita Lokhande	Indore
Manas Satpathy	Bengaluru
Anjali Pandey	Delhi
Vipul Kumar Sharma	Delhi
Bharat Chawda	Indore
Deepika Tiwari	Lucknow
Simran Vaid	Jammu
Sohan Master	Ahmedabad
Pinky Sarkar	Jamshedpur
Mohit Chadda	New Delhi
Shreya Arora	Kanpur
Abbas Khan	Lucknow
Naziya Khan	Mumbai
Rishiraj Singh	Jaipur
Loveleen Walia	Singapore
Shareen Pathak	Singapore
Naman Shaw	Jamshedpur
Suraj Joshi	Bengaluru
Gargi Sharma	Jaipur
Ravish Sharma	Ludhiana
Shraddha Arya	New Delhi
Divyanka Tripathi	Bhopal

== Season 3 ==
See Idea Zee Cinestars Like season 1 & 2, season 3 also gave many stars to entertainment industry. Winners of Zee Cinestars 2007

- Piyush Chopra --- Group B
- Sabina Sheema --- Group B

Runner-up Zee Cinestars 2007

- Gaurav Bajpai --- Group B
- Chandani Desai --- Group B

=== Contestants ===
Group A

- Aadil Sharma
- Mamta Dutta
- Manav Sharma
- Pallavi Dutt
- Mrityunjay Nigam
- Piku Sharma
- Rahul Manchanda
- Rakhi Verma
- Rizwan Sikander
- Ritwika Ghoshal
- Sahil Arora
- Varsha Lodh
- Rati Pandey
- Varun Jaiswal

Group B

- Aalesha Syed
- Ajay Chabria
- Ankita Lokhande
- Ashif
- Chandani Desai
- Gaurav Bajpai
- Kanchan More
- Hardik Soni
- Minal Gorpade
- Kartik Shetty
- Rachel Gurjar
- Prabhjot Dhillon
- Surod Rizvi
- Rohit Raghav
- Piyush Chopra
- Raj Saluja
- Ruchika Babbar
- Sabina Sheema
- Vinay Kamble
