= Deewaniyat =

Indian drama television series

- Genre: Romance; Thriller
- Written by: Rajesh Chawla
- Screenplay by: Mallika Dutt; Sidra Iqbal
- Story by: Vishal Watwani; Renu Gianani; Bijal Joshi Watwani
- Creative director: Siddhartha Vankar
- Starring: Kritika Singh Yadav; Vijayendra Kumeria; Navneet Malik
- Opening theme: Deewaniyat
- Country of origin: India
- Original language: Hindi
- No. of seasons: 1
- No. of episodes: 79

Production
- Producers: Pradeep Kumar; Rajesh Ram Singh; Pia Bajpiee; Shaika Parween
- Camera setup: Multi-camera
- Running time: 22–25 minutes
- Production companies: Cockcrow Entertainment; Shaika Films

Original release
- Network: Star Plus
- Release: 11 November 2024 – 29 January 2025

Related
- Eeramana Rojave

Deewaniyat (transl. Obsession) is an Indian Hindi-language television romance thriller series that aired from 11 November 2024 to 29 January 2025 on Star Plus. It streams on Disney+ Hotstar and is produced by Cockrow Entertainment and Shaika Films. The series stars Kritika Singh Yadav, Vijayendra Kumeria and Navneet Malik in the lead roles. It is the second official Hindi remake of Star Vijay Tamil series Eeramana Rojave. It was replaced by Pocket Mein Aasman in its timeslot.

== Premise ==
The story focuses on the lives of Jeet and Mannat caught in a blossoming love story amidst an intense feud between their families. Will their love win over the hatred of their families?

== Cast ==
=== Main ===
- Kritika Singh Yadav as Mannat "Manu" Malik Chaudhary: Gita and Ranvijay's eldest daughter; Falak and Leher's sister; Jeet and Dev's childhood friend; Jeet's love interest turned ex-fiancée; Dev's wife (2024–2025)
- Vijayendra Kumeria as Dev Chaudhary: Sakshi and Jaideep's younger son; Jeet and Aditi's brother; Babita's half-brother; Alisha's ex-boyfriend; Mannat's childhood friend turned husband (2024–2025)
- Navneet Malik as Jeet Chaudhary: Sakshi and Jaideep's elder son; Dev and Aditi's brother; Babita's half brother; Mannat's childhood friend and love interest turned ex-fiance (2024)

=== Recurring ===
- Manek Bedi as Jaideep Chaudhary: Sakshi's husband; Babita, Jeet, Dev and Aditi's father; Ranvijay's best friend (2024–2025)
- Gauri Tonk as Sakshi Chaudhary: Jaideep's second wife; Jeet, Dev and Aditi's mother (2024–2025)
- Raaj Sunger as Ranvijay Malik: Chandra's son; Gita's husband; Mannat, Falak and Leher's father; Jaideep's best friend (2024–2025)
- Bhawana Aneja as Gita Malik: Ranvijay's wife; Mannat, Falak and Leher's mother (2024–2025)
- Vahbbiz Dorabjee / Tanvi Thakkar as Babita Chaudhary: Jaideep's daughter; Sakshi's step-daughter; Jeet, Dev and Aditi's half-sister; Mayank's wife (2024–2025) / (2025)
- Harsimran Oberoi as Falak Malik: Gita and Ranvijay's second daughter; Mannat and Leher's sister (2024–2025)
- Aanchal Soni as Leher Malik: Gita and Ranvijay's youngest daughter; Mannat and Falak's sister (2024–2025)
- Riddhi Singh as Aditi Chaudhary: Sakshi and Jaideep's daughter; Jeet and Dev's sister; Babita's half-sister (2024–2025)
- Kaushal Kapoor as Mr. Chaudhary: Jaideep's father; Babita, Jeet, Dev and Aditi's grandfather (2024–2025)
- Nikhat Khan as Chandra Malik: Ranvijay's mother; Mannat, Falak and Leher's grandmother (2024–2025)
- Reva Kaurase as Alisha Ahlawat: Dev's ex-girlfriend and obsessive lover turned enemy; Mannat's enemy (2024–2025)
- Ayush Anand as Rudra Hooda: Rani's son; Mannat's obsessive lover turned enemy; Jeet and Dev's enemy; Jeet's murderer (2024–2025)
- Sheetal Maulik as Rani Hooda: Rudra's mother (2024–2025)
- Karan Chaudhary as Mayank: Babita's husband (2024–2025)
- Jitendra Bohara as Satpal: Dev's best friend (2024–2025)
- Pratiksha Singh Vishen as Tanu: Mannat's best friend (2024–2025)
- Ankit Gulati as Soham: Dev's best friend (2024–2025)
- Snehal Borkar as Aliya (2024–2025)
