= Navneet Malik =

Indian actor (born 1993)

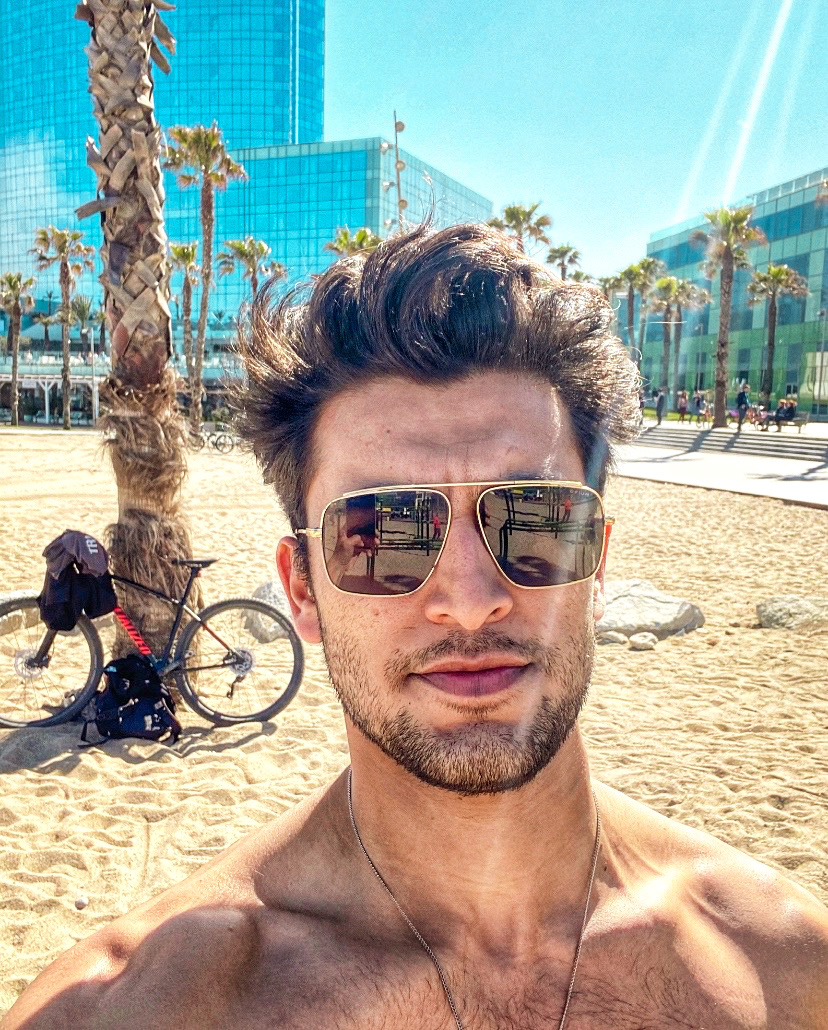
- Born: 1 July 1993 (age 32); Rohtak, Haryana, India
- Occupations: Actor; model
- Years active: 2022–present
- Known for: The Freelancer; Deewaniyat

Navneet Malik is an Indian actor and model who is best known for his portrayal of Mohsin Fazal in The Freelancer (2023) and Jeet Chaudhary in Deewaniyat (2025).

== Personal life ==
Malik is the first male model winner of the Max Elite Model Look India (2014) held in Mumbai. He went on to represent India at the world finale of the Elite Model Look 2014 contest held at Shenzhen Bay Sports Center, Shenzhen, China in December 2014. Malik completed his civil engineering in Rohtak, Haryana, before moving to Mumbai to pursue his acting dream.

In 2024, Malik launched an app called Starnex for aspiring artists.

== Career ==
In Mumbai, Malik attended the Actor's Truth workshop trained under acting coach Saurabh Sachdeva. Later, he appeared in over 50 commercials including brands like Harley Davidson, Royal Enfield, Being Human, Raymond, Peter England, Thumbs Up, and Vivo.

In 2022, Malik made his Bollywood debut in Love Hostel starring Bobby Deol, Vikrant Massey and Sanya Malhotra. In the same year, he was seen in the film Heropanti 2 starring Tiger Shroff, playing Tara Sutaria's boyfriend.

== Filmography ==
=== Films ===
Year	Title	Role	Notes	Ref.
2022	Love Hostel	Param		
2022	Heropanti 2	Inaaya's boyfriend		
TBA	The Virgin Tree	TBA		

=== Television ===
Year	Title	Role	Notes	Ref.
2022	Swaraj	Bakshi Jagbandhu	Episodic lead (Episode 18)	
2024	Aankh Micholi	Sumedh Thakkar		
2024–2025	Deewaniyat	Jeet Chaudhary		

=== Web series ===
Year	Title	Role	Notes	Ref.
2023	The Freelancer	Mohsin Fazal	Negative lead	
TBA	Nawazuddin	TBA	Netflix series	

=== Music videos ===
Year	Title	Singer(s)	Ref.
2022	Jaaniya	Ankit Tiwari	

== See also ==
- List of Hindi television actors
- List of Indian television actors
