= Rati Pandey =

Indian actress (born 1982)

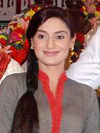
- Pandey in 2012
- Occupation: Actress
- Years active: 2006–present
- Known for: Hitler Didi, Miley Jab Hum Tum, Shaadi Mubarak

Rati Pandey is an Indian actress known for her performances in Hitler Didi, Miley Jab Hum Tum, Porus, Devi Adi Parashakti, Begusarai, Har Ghar Kuch Kehta Hai and Shaadi Mubarak ,Iron Lady (Indian TV series).

== Early life and background ==
Rati Pandey was born in a Hindu Brahmin family on 11 September 1982 in Assam, India. She lived there for seven years and then her family moved to Patna, Bihar where she studied at St. Karen's High School, Patna. Sushant Singh Rajput's elder sister used to be her classmate. She completed schooling from the Kendriya Vidyalaya school, Sadiq Nagar, New Delhi. Rati graduated from the Miranda House College at Delhi University specializing in Economics.

== Career ==
Rati Pandey started her career as a participant in the reality show Idea Zee Cinestars ki Khoj in 2006. She also appeared in Sony TV's crime based thriller C.I.D, and Sahara One's horror show Raat Hone Ko Hai. She has appeared in TV commercial of Champions Appliances as well.

Rati's television career continued with Deepti Bhatnagar's Shaadi Street on STAR One, in which she played the lead role "Nandini". After that, she played the lead role of Prarthna Thakraal in Zee TV's show Har Ghar Kuch Kehta Hai produced by Shreya Creations.

In 2008, she got the role of Nupur Bhushan in the show Miley Jab Hum Tum. Nupur was a bubbly girl who became popular with fans; when the producers wrote the character out of the show, the show's fans convinced them to let Nupur return to the show.

After the end of Miley Jab Hum Tum in 2010, Rati participated in the dance reality show Nachle Ve with Saroj Khan on NDTV Imagine. She also participated in a travel-based reality show on Star Plus called Ritz Jee Le Ye Pal.

In 2011, Pandey was offered a lead role in the show Hitler Didi opposite Sumit Vats. She portrayed several different characters in the show.

Apart from daily soaps, Rati has also appeared in reality shows including Laughter Ke Phatke and Zara Nachke Dikha on STAR One, SAB TV's show Movers and Shakers (Hosted by Shekhar Suman), Colors TV's Bigg Boss 6 Grand Finale (Hosted by Salman Khan) and Sony TV's Comedy Circus. She has also been part of Zee Rishton ki Antakshari 2012.

Rati hosted the 10th Indian Television Academy Awards in 2010 along with Arjun Bijlani. She also hosted Zee TV's 20th Diwali Special Episode and a brief segment of Zee Rishtey Awards 2012 together with Rithvik Dhanjani.

After a sabbatical of two years, Pandey returned to television in 2016 with Begusarai, where she played 'Komal'. In the same year, she was also seen in a special cameo appearance on TV show 'Tenali Rama' as Princess Devyani.

In 2017, she portrayed the role of Queen Anusuya in Sony TV's Porus. In 2019, Pandey played the role of Vidya in Star Plus's Divya Drishti.

In October 2020, she took the replacement lead female role of Star Plus’s Shaadi Mubarak opposite Manav Gohil which was played by Rajshree Thakur.

== Filmography ==
=== Films ===
Year	Title	Role	Language	Notes	Ref.
2011	Beti	Daughter	Hindi	Short film	
2024	Rang De Basanti	Gauri	Bhojpuri		
2025	Rishtey		Bhojpuri		

=== Television ===
Year	Title	Role	Notes	Ref.
2005	CID Special Bureau	Niveditha (Lab Assistant)	Episode: Killer in the Lab Part I & III	
2006	Zee Cinestars	Contestant		
2007	Shaadi Street	Nandini		
2007	CID	Verona		
2007	Raat Hone Ko Hai	Priya		
2007–2008	Har Ghar Kuch Kehta Hai	Prarthna Singh Thakral		
2008–2010	Miley Jab Hum Tum	Nupur Bhushan Sharma		
2010	Nachle Ve with Saroj Khan	Contestant		
2011	Ritz Jee Le Ye Pal	Contestant		
2011–2013	Hitler Didi	Indira Sharma Kumar Diwan Chandela		
2013	Hitler Didi	Zaara Khan		
2012	Comedy Circus	Contestant		
2014–2015	Box Cricket League 1	Contestant		
2015–2016	Begusarai	Komal Thakur		
2017–2018	Porus	Queen Anusuya		
2018	Iron Lady (Indian TV series)	Indira Sharma		
2020	Devi Adi Parashakti	Adi Parashakti / Parvati / Sati		
2020–2021	Shaadi Mubarak	Preeti Jindal Tibrewal		
2022	Jai Hanuman – Sankatmochan Naam Tiharo	Devi Chhaya		
2022	Jai Hanuman – Sankatmochan Naam Tiharo	Devi Prabha		
2022–2023	Corporate Sarpanch – Beti Desh Ki	Keerti Singh		
2025	Mata Saraswati	Saraswati		

==== Special appearances ====
Year	Title	Role	Ref.
2008	Kyunki Saas Bhi Kabhi Bahu Thi	Nupur Bhushan	
2008	Kumkum – Ek Pyara Sa Bandhan	Nupur Bhushan	
2009	Laughter Ke Phatke	Herself	
2012	Movers and Shakers	Herself	
2013	Bigg Boss 6	Herself	
2019	Divya Drishti	Vidya Sharma	
2019	Nazar	Vidya Sharma	
2019	Tenali Rama	Princess Devyani	
2025	Binddii	Pallavi Pathak	

=== Web series ===
Year	Title	Role	Notes	Ref.
2022	Aashiqana	Mrs. Chauhan	Season 1	
2024–2025	Maa Saraswati	Devi Saraswati		
2024	Insta Empire	Anika	Audio series	
2025	Shaktipeeth ke kal Bhairav	devi aadi parashakti/Sati/Parvati	webserial	
