= Saptapadii =

- Film poster
- Directed by: Niranjan Thade
- Written by: Chandrakant Shah; Kaajal Oza Vaidya; Niranjan Thade
- Produced by: Amitabh Bachchan
- Starring: Manav Gohil; Swaroop Sampat; Sanika raghawa
- Cinematography: Navneet Misser
- Edited by: Rajesh Parmar; Prashant Naik
- Music by: Rajat Dholakia and Piyush Kanojia
- Production company: Amitabh Bachchan Corporation
- Distributed by: Different Strokes Communications Pvt. Ltd. (Dr. Devdatt Kapadia)
- Release date: 1 February 2013
- Running time: 105 minutes
- Country: India
- Language: Gujarati

Saptapadii is 2013 Gujarati film produced by Amitabh Bachchan Corporation starring Manav Gohil, and Swaroop Sampat in leading roles. Saptapadii is the story of a contemporary Gujarati (Indian) woman who risks her comfortably settled married life of 20 years to do what she believes in. Saptapadii had been released in theatres across India on 1 February 2013, and had a record-breaking run of 12 weeks. In addition to the financial success, the critical success is also evident from the fact that it has been selected into 7 film festivals in 5 countries, notably winning a Special Mention for the Green Rose at the Jaipur International Film Festival. It is also being described as the turning point in Gujarati Cinema.

== Plot ==
The story revolves around a couple Siddharth and Swati Sanghvi. Both are in their late 40s. Life takes a turn for the couple during a visit to Saputara, to celebrate their 20th anniversary, where Swati meets a 9-year-old child. Being an expert in treating traumatised kids, she recognises the symptoms in this child. Swati takes the onus of bringing the child out of trauma. Eventually it is revealed that the child is a victim of a terror attack and has lost both his parents in it. The film is about how the child changes the couple’s lives.

== Cast ==
- Manav Gohil as Siddharth Sanghvi
- Swaroop Sampat as Swati Sanghvi
- Heet Samani as Mohsin
- Shailee Shah as Shreya
- Utkarsh Mazumdar as Dr. Patrawala
- Homi Wadia as Commissioner of Police, Special Branch
- Vihaan Choudhary as Rohan
- The Children of Primary School, Saputara
- Sanika raghawa as priya
