= Aankh Micholi (TV series) =

Indian television series

- Genre: Drama
- Written by: Raghuvir Shekhawat
- Screenplay by: Seema Mantri; Rahul Patel
- Story by: Vaishali Naik; Surbhi Saral; Shruti Tiwari
- Directed by: Jaladh K. Sharma; Sonakshi Sumeet Mittal
- Creative director: Shweta Vishnoi
- Starring: Khushi Dubey; Navneet Malik
- Country of origin: India
- Original language: Hindi
- No. of seasons: 1
- No. of episodes: 81

Production
- Producers: Sumeet Hukamchand Mittal; Shashi Mittal; Jitendra Singla
- Cinematography: Ajay Lalta Gupta; Vipul Virendra Singh
- Editors: Jay B Ghadiali; Saurabh Raj Khanna
- Camera setup: Multi-camera
- Running time: 20–22 minutes
- Production company: Shashi Sumeet Productions

Original release
- Network: StarPlus
- Release: 22 January – 23 April 2024

Aankh Micholi (transl. Eye Catching) is an Indian Hindi-language television drama series that premiered on 22 January 2024 on StarPlus and streams digitally on Disney+ Hotstar. Produced by Shashi Mittal, Sumeet Mittal and Jitendra Singla under Shashi Sumeet Productions, it stars Khushi Dubey and Navneet Malik.

== Plot ==
This story follows the hardships of Rukmini, an IPS aspirant married to a fifth grade pass tea seller Sumedh.

== Cast ==
=== Main ===
- Khushi Dubey as Rukmini Jadeja Thakkar: Vandana and Arvind's elder daughter; Sonal's sister; Malhar's ex-girlfriend; Sumedh's wife (2024)
  - Harithi Joshi as young Rukmini Jadeja
- Navneet Malik as Sumedh Thakkar: Palak and Vijay's son; Kesar's step-son; Malhar, Rupal and Karina's half-brother; Rukmini's husband (2024)
  - Vidhaan Sharma as young Sumedh Thakkar

=== Recurring ===
- Hitesh Bharadwaj as Malhar Thakkar: Kesar and Vijay's son; Rupal and Karina's brother; Sumedh's half-brother; Rukmini's ex-boyfriend (2024)
- Bhakti Rathod as Kesar Thakkar: Bhaven's sister; Vijay's widow; Malhar, Rupal and Karina's mother; Sumedh's step-mother (2024)
- Alisha Prajapati as Rupal Thakkar: Kesar and Vijay's elder daughter; Malhar and Karina's sister; Sumedh's half-sister (2024)
- Suushmita Singh as Prisha: Rachna and Bhaven's younger daughter; Shivani's sister (2024)
- Preetika Chauhan as Shivani Kumar: Rachna and Bhaven's elder daughter; Prisha's sister; Arpit's wife; Pintu, Golu and Pankti's mother (2024)
- Drashti Bhanushali as Karina Thakkar: Kesar and Vijay's younger daughter; Malhar and Rupal's sister; Sumedh's half-sister (2024)
- Mridul Kumar Sinha as Arvind Jadeja: Bakula's brother; Vandana's widower; Piyush, Rukmini and Sonal's father (2024)
- Utkarsh Gupta as Piyush Jadeja: Vandana and Arvind's son; Rukmini and Sonal's brother (2024)
- Mahima Mhatre as Sonal Jadeja: Vandana and Arvind's younger daughter; Piyush and Rukmini's sister (2024)
- Chaya Vora as Bakula Jadeja: Arvind's sister (2024)
- Ashish Ratnaparkhi as Sohil (2024)
- Aria Sakaria as Pankti Kumar: Shivani and Arpit's daughter (2024)
- Vaidik Poriya as Pintu Kumar: Shivani and Arpit's elder son (2024)
- Aalok Shaw as Golu Kumar: Shivani and Arpit's younger son (2024)
- Himanshi Jain as Niti: Sumedh's former prospective bride (2024)

== Production ==
It was initially rumored that the series would be a new season of the 2011 Shashi Sumeet Productions' series Diya Aur Baati Hum.
