= Naaginn (2007 TV series) =

Indian supernatural television series

- Promotional logo
- Also known as: Naaginn – Waadon Ki Agniparikshaa
- Written by: C.L.Saini; Mitali
- Directed by: Yash Chauhan; Bhagwan Yadav
- Opening theme: "Naaginn" by Richa Sharma
- Country of origin: India
- Original language: Hindi
- No. of episodes: 219

Production
- Running time: 24 minutes

Original release
- Network: Zee TV
- Release: 5 October 2007 – 11 April 2009

Naaginn – Waadon Ki Agniparikshaa (transl. Naaginn - Litmus Test) is a Hindi television series that aired on Zee TV from 5 October 2007 till 11 April 2009. The show was produced by AK Films.

== Plot ==
The show is based on a tale of an ichchhadhari naagin (a female shape-shifting cobra) named Amrita. She transforms herself into a woman to take revenge from the Singh family, which had killed her parents (king and queen of Naaglok) to get the valuable naagmani (cobra gem).

While dying, the queen instructs Amrita to take revenge from the killers and get back the naagmani to revive her parents. She gets married into the same family whose members had killed her parents to take revenge. But the dilemma is that her duty as a wife and her love towards her human husband Arjun comes in the way of her revenge. After a lot of turmoil in her life, Amrita gets pregnant. However, in protecting Amrita and the unborn babies, her husband Arjun dies. All the Singh family members die, except for Arjun's grandmother Triveni. Amrita gives birth to identical twins. Triveni and Surmaya come and kill Amrita with the deadly poison, Vasuki. However, another ichchhadhari naag, Kanishk, helps Amrita who wants to live for her daughters. He advises her to become a ghostly spirit so she can watch over her children. However, she will not be able to touch them and they will not be able to see her. Amrita agrees. Amrita's two daughters are about seven years old and they will look exactly like Amrita when they grow up. One daughter is with Triveni, who treats her miserably, and the other daughter is with a village woman, who soon dies. Triveni goes to the sorcerer Bhairavnath who helps her in trying to bring Amrita to the human world so she can be finished off forever. Season 1 ends with Amrita's ghost being captured.

== Cast ==
- Sayantani Ghosh as Amrita Arjun Singh / Shivali Singh / Sanchi Singh (Ichchhadhari naagin)
  - Khushi Dubey as young Amrita / Shivali Singh / Sanchi Singh (Amrita's Twin Daughters)
- Sachin Shroff as Arjun Singh
- Manav Gohil as Naagraj
- Preeti Puri as Naagrani
- Divya Dwivedi as Vishakha
- Aruna Irani as Triveni Singh (Maa Sa)
- Alihassan Turabi as Rudra Singh
- Siddharth Dhawan as Vishnu Singh
- Shahbaz Khan as Bhairavnath
- Lata Sabharwal / Niyati Joshi as Ratna Vishnu Singh
- Neel Patel as Arjun Vishnu Singh (Vishnu and Ratna's Son)
- Namrata Thapa as Archana Rudra Singh
- Jaskaran Singh Gandhi as Dev
- Amar Upadhyay as Vishal
- Eijaz Khan as Ranveer
- Shaleen Bhanot / Manoj Bidwai as Kanishk / Keshav
- Sonia Singh as Kanak Singh
- Mayank Anand as Vikram Singh
- Jividha Sharma as Saroj Vikram Singh
- Adi Irani as Kaka Sa
- Abha Parmar as Bua Sa
- Manini Mishra as Ambalika
- Sachin Verma as Karan Singh
- Aanchal Dwivedi as Sneha Karan Singh (Karan's Wife)
- Shweta Tiwari as Queen Surmaya
- Gajendra Chauhan as Naagdev
- Mehul Kajaria as Vishesh
- Rakshanda Khan as Mayuri
- Sudha Chandran as Maa Pravanchikha
- Sulakshana Khatri as Katyani
- Dincy Vira as Pari
- Jaya Binju as Majharika
- Puneet Sachdev as Pawan
- Sailesh Gulabani as Agni
- Chhavi Mittal as Aastha
- Karishma Randhawa as Urja
- Supriya Pathak as Sudha
- Kiran Kumar as Mr. Singh, Triveni's husband (only in photoframe)
- Shalini Sahuta as Mohini
- Unknown as Bhujang

== Adaptations ==
Language	Title	Original release	Network (s)	Last aired	Notes
Kannada	Naagini ನಾಗಿಣಿ	8 February 2016	Zee Kannada	7 February 2020	Remake
Marathi	Icchadhari Naagin इच्छाधारी नागीण	Upcoming	Zee Marathi	TBA	Remake
Bengali	Icchadhari Naagkonya ইচ্ছাধারী নাগকন্যা	Upcoming	Zee Bangla	TBA	Remake
