= Manav Gohil =

Indian television actor (born 1974)

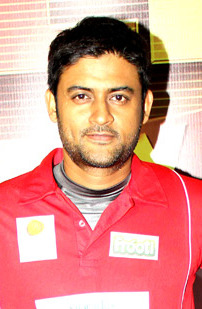
- Gohil in 2014
- Born: 9 November 1974 (age 51); Surendranagar, Gujarat, India
- Occupation: Actor
- Years active: 2000–present
- Spouse: Shweta Kawatra (m. 2004)
- Children: 1

Manav Gohil is an Indian actor known for his work in Hindi television and films. He is best known for his roles in the soap opera Kahaani Ghar Ghar Kii, Nach Baliye, CID, Adaalat, Shaadi Mubarak, Tenali Rama and Dhurandhar film series.

== Early and personal life ==
Manav Gohil was born in Surendranagar, Gujarat, India and later moved to Vadodara for his education, where he completed a Bachelor of Commerce followed by an MBA. He is married to television actress Shweta Kawatra. The couple participated in the dance competition show Nach Baliye 2, where Manav was awarded Best Dancer by Saroj Khan. They have a daughter, born on 11 May 2012. The couple practices Nichiren Buddhism.

== Career ==
Manav Gohil began his career in the early 2000s after winning the “Man of Gujarat” pageant and moving from Vadodara to Mumbai to pursue acting, training under Kishore Namit Kapoor.

He made his Television debut with Choodiyan (2001) and became known for roles in Kahaani Ghar Ghar Kii, Kkusum, Kasautii Zindagii Kay, and CID. He also worked in theatre, including Kennedy Bridge and Lady from the Ocean.

After a break around 2006 due to the shelved film Bhanvraa, he returned with The Buddy Project. He later gained further appreciation in Yam Hain Hum and Tenali Rama, notably for his role as King Krishnadevaraya.

He has also worked in regional cinema, debuting in the Gujarati film Saptapadii, produced by Amitabh Bachchan’s company, which ran successfully in theatres and was screened at the Jaipur International Film Festival.

In 2020, he played Keertan “K.T.” Tibrewal in Shaadi Mubarak on Star Plus, alongside Rajshree Thakur and later Rati Pandey. He then appeared in Kaamnaa (2021) as Vaibhav Kapoor, a manipulative businessman, marking a shift toward more negative roles.

Gohil portrayed Sushant Bansal in the spy-thriller Dhurandhar (2025) and its sequel Dhurandhar: The Revenge, directed by Aditya Dhar.

== Filmography ==
Key
†	Denotes films that have not yet been released

=== Film ===
Year	Title	Role	Notes	Ref.
2000	Josh	Ganpat		
2003	Chori Chori	Ranbir's friend		
2013	Saptapadii	Siddharth Sanghvi	Gujarati film	
2013	Love Yoou Soniye	Parminder		
2017	Dhantya Open	Prakash Shah	Gujarati film	
2017	Kis Kiss Ka Kiss	Abhishek		
2019	Super 30	IAS Purushottam Singh		
2020	Baaghi 3	Asif Ali		
2021	Tribhanga	Raghav		
2023	Chandlo	Sharan	Gujarati film	
2025	Jalebi Rocks	Lawyer Rohit Mehta	Gujarati film	
2025	Dhurandhar	Sushant Bansal		
2026	Mauje Dariya	Mr. Patel	Gujarati film	
2026	Dhurandhar: The Revenge	Sushant Bansal		
2026	Senior KG.	Alok		
2026	Unbowed †	TBA		
2027	Picture Superhit †	TBA	Gujarati film	
2027	Antony †	TBA		
2027	The Photographer †	TBA	Telugu film	
2027	What’s Up Vats †	TBA	Gujarati Film	

=== Television ===
Year	Serial	Role	Notes	Ref.
2000	C.A.T.S.			
2000–2001	Choodiyan			
2000–2001	Kahaani Ghar Ghar Kii	Vikram		
2001–2002	Kkusum	Vishal Mehra		
2001–2002	Kasautii Zindagii Kay	Praveen Sengupta		
2003	Kahani Terrii Merrii	Dhruv		
2003	Ssshhhh...Koi Hai	Captain Kishan		
2003	Saara Akaash	Flight Lt. Jatin Gohil		
2003–2004	Manshaa	Rohit		
2004–2005	C.I.D.	Inspector Daksh		
2004–2005	Ayushmaan	Dr. Mayank		
2004–2005	Isse Kehte Hai Golmaal Ghar			
2005	CID Special Bureau	Inspector Daksh		
2005	Kaisa Ye Pyar Hai	Angad's detective friend		
2005	Hotel Kingston	Mr. Mathur		
2005–2006	Remix	Debashish Mitra		
2006	Sarrkkar – Risshton Ki Ankahi Kahani	Laksh Pandit		
2006	Vaidehi	Neel Agnihotri		
2007	Betiyaan Apni Yaa Paraaya Dhan	Karan Bali		
2007	Saarrthi	Advocate Shyam		
2007	Lucky	Professor Mohit Nanda		
2007; 2008	Naaginn	Naagraj		
2010	Agle Janam Mohe Bitiya Hi Kijo	Dr. Shailendra Kumar		
2012–2014	The Buddy Project	Aniruddh "Junglee" Jaitley		
2013	Lakhon Mein Ek	Mahesh / Kailash Satyarthi		
2013	Adaalat	Abhinav "Goldie" Shekhawat		
2013	Savdhaan India	Danny		
2013	Qubool Hai	Sanjay Mehta		
2013–2014	Devon Ke Dev...Mahadev	Andhak		
2013–2014	Khelti Hai Zindagi Aankh Micholi	Sanjay Mehta		
2014–2016	Yam Hain Hum	Yamraj		
2015	Tujhse Naraaz Nahin Zindagi	Host		
2015	Badi Door Se Aaye Hain	Yamraj		
2016	Khidki	Aloknath Tripathi		
2016	Chidiya Ghar	Manav		
2017–2020	Tenali Rama	Maharaj Krishnadevaraya		
2019	Kesari Nandan	Hanumant Singh		
2020–2021	Shaadi Mubarak	Keertan Tibrewal "KT"		
2021–2022	Kaamnaa	Vaibhav Kapoor		
2022–2023	Main Hoon Aparajita	Akshay Singh		
2023–2024	Dabangii – Mulgii Aayi Re Aayi	Inspector Ankush Rajyavadhkar		
2025–2026	Binddii	Dayanand Pathak		

=== Reality shows ===
Year	Title	Role	Ref.
2005	Fame Gurukul	Host	
2006	Fear Factor India	Contestant	
2006	Nach Baliye 2	Contestant	
2008	Bura Na Mano Holi Hai	Grand Finale Performer	
2014–2015	Box Cricket League	Contestant	
2016	Box Cricket League 2	Contestant	

=== Web series ===
Year	Title	Role	Channel
2022	Matsyavedh	Parth	Shemaroo
2024	Karate Girls	Ajay Kadam	MX Player
2026	Ustaad Ka Comeback	Mahavir Sangwan	StoryTV
2026	Chaar Yaar	DCP Wasim Khan	Amazon Prime Video
