= Aaina – Roop Nahin, Haqeeqat Bhi Dikhaye =

Indian drama television series

- Genre: Drama; Romantic
- Created by: Rashmi Sharma
- Screenplay by: Gurmeet Kaur Udayan; Dialogues; Sharad Tripati
- Story by: Kamal Pandey; Garima Goyal
- Directed by: Vijay Singh
- Starring: Niharika Chouksey; Farman Haider
- Opening theme: "Saavre Piyaaa..."
- Composer: Elvish Velentine
- Country of origin: India
- Original language: Hindi
- No. of seasons: 1
- No. of episodes: 103

Production
- Producer: Rashmi Sharma
- Cinematography: Sachin Mishra
- Editor: Sanjay Singh
- Camera setup: Multi-Camera
- Running time: 22-24 minutes
- Production company: Rashmi Sharma Telefilms Limited

Original release
- Network: Dangal
- Release: 11 December 2023 – 7 April 2024

Aaina – Roop Nahin, Haqeeqat Bhi Dikhaye (transl. Mirror – Shows Not Only Appearance, But Also Reality) is an Indian Hindi-language drama, romance television series that premiered on 11 December 2023 on Dangal. Produced by Rashmi Sharma under the banner of Rashmi Sharma Telefilms. The series stars Niharika Chouksey and Farman Haider in lead roles. The show was went off-air on 7 April 2024.

== Plot ==
Naresh Singh a local gangster turned village chief lives with his family at Munger, Bihar as the entire society had respected him. One day, his wife, Kumud, gives birth to their child, but he tries to kill the baby by drowning the baby into the Ganges River. Kumud threatens to kill herself if he throws the baby in the river, but he calls her bluff and tries to drown the baby. Kumud jumps in the river to save her baby and emerges from the river wither the baby. As a compromise of keeping the baby alive, Kumud locks the baby in a room, away from the world, closed behind three separate doors.

=== 21 years later ===
Naresh and Kumud's daughter, Sunaina has now grown up to be a beautiful woman, but she is still locked inside the room. No one besides her parents know about her existence, but she knows everyone in the family despite being separated from them. Kumud raises her in secret with love for years and warns her of the dangers of the outside world. Sunaina dreams of going outside.

Naresh still hates Sunaina, but it isn’t revealed why. Rajkumari wants to fortify her power and status, so she plans on getting her US-based son, Naman, married with Naresh’s niece, Pankaja. Due to Pankaja’s marriage plans, Naresh is scared of Sunaina’s secret coming out. Naresh instructs his brother, Pravesh, to kill Sunaina before Pankaja’s wedding. However, Pravesh fails to kill Sunaina.

Sunaina sneaks out of her room during the engagement ceremony to look at Pankaja’s fiancé as she wants to know what a groom looks like. Sunaina and Naman meet each other, and Naman falls for her at first sight. Naresh finds out that Sunaina snuck out of her room, so he burns the room along with Sunaina. Kumud manages to save Sunaina and Sunaina’s existence is revealed to the rest of the family.

Naresh is still afraid of Sunaina’s secret coming out to the world and ruining his status. He decides to sell Sunaina to a transgender goon named Maharani. Maharani tries to kill Sunaina but she is saved by Naman. Sunaina and Naman confess their love for each other and get married at the temple. Pankaja is heartbroken and vows to take revenge against Sunaina. Ramola joins hands with Pankaja to ruin Sunaina’s life.

Kumud and Naresh are worried from the marriage and try to separate Sunaina and Naman. However, against all odds, Sunaina and Naman officially get married. On Sunaina’s wedding night, Kumud reveals the secret that Sunaina is a Kinnar, and that is why Kumud hid her from the world because the society would not have accepted her. Pankaja and Ramola learn about Sunaina’s truth and decide to use it to seek revenge against Sunaina.

Sunaina gets into an accident, where the doctor exposes Sunaina's truth to Naman. Naman is shocked to find out this truth, and thus Naman starts to hate her. Naman humiliates Sunaina and things become bitter between Naman and Sunaina. Naman's family members start doubting about their relationship. Meanwhile, Sunaina decides to leave everyone behind so they can live their life without her. She leaves behind a letter and leaves the house.

=== 2 Years Later ===
In Jalandhar, Sunaina's doppelgänger, Simran Singh is introduced. Unlike Sunaina, who was meek and shy, Simran is brave, fearless and bubbly. Kumud is still heartbroken over Sunaina's disappearance and presumed death. Similarly, Naman still misses and loves Sunaina, but he is being forced to marry Pankaja as his family has gone bankrupt.

Simran ends up in Munger to avoid the MLA’s son and local goon, Jaswinder, who is hellbent on marrying her and had even kidnapped her. Naman mistakes Simran to be Sunaina, and Simran decides to play along to avoid Jaswinder.

Simran pretends to have lost her memory and comes back with Naman to Sunaina’s house. Besides Naman, Shivya and Kumud, everyone suspects her to be fake because of her Punjabi dialect, attitude and behavior.

Shivya reveals to Simran about how Kumud was abused and tortured by Ramola and Pankaja. Simran vows to seek revenge against everyone that hurt Kumud. Initially happy to see her daughter again, Kumud quickly figures out that Simran isn’t Sunaina. Simran reveals her truth about being an orphan and promises to be the perfect daughter to Kumud.

It is revealed that Pankaja had pushed Sunaina off a cliff and left her to die. Pankaja brings Jaswinder to expose Simran. However, the DNA report comes out positive, and Simran kicks Jaswinder out of the house. Amidst all this, Simran has fallen in love with Naman, who is now sure that Simran is Sunaina.

Simran questions Kumud about the DNA report, to which Kumud reveals that she gave birth to twins, Simran, a girl, and Sunaina, a kinnar. Naresh wanted a son so Kumud gives Simran up for an adoption, but keeps Sunaina as no one would want to adopt a kinnar. Unfortunately, Simran’s entire adoptive family die in a car crash, and Kumud never reveals the truth to anyone.

Simran accepts Kumud as her mother and forgives her for everything. She decides to seek revenge against Pankaja for killing Sunaina. Simran starts blackmailing Pankaja with her confession video and makes Pankaja her servant.

However, Ramola finds out why Pankaja is acting weird. Rajkumari overhears Pankaja and Ramola’s conversation and encourages Pankaja to destroy the evidence. Pankaja destroys Simran’s phone and vows to expose Simran as a fraud.

Goons arrive at the house and try to shoot Simran. Afraid of losing another daughter, Kumud reveals Simran’s truth. Naman is shocked to learn that Simran has been lying to him. Simran makes the goons admit that Rajkumari had hired them. However, Rajkumari turns the tables and acts as if she did it for the family’s sake.

Naman starts to hate Simran for being a fraud and trying to take Sunaina’s place. Ramola takes advantage of this and tries to get Pankaja married to Naman.

Meanwhile, Naresh is mad at Kumud for hiding the truth about Simran. He breaks all relationship between them. Simran promises Kumud that she will make Naresh realize his mistakes.

Shockingly, Pravesh supports Simran and Kumud. Pravesh encourages Naresh to accept Simran as his daughter because blood is blood. Pravesh also asks Ramola to stop hating Kumud and Simran. Surprisingly, Ramola accepts that she has sinned a lot and agrees to reform her ways.

On the other hand, Shivya tries to reform Pankaja. Shivya tells Pankaja that she isn’t in love with Naman, but it’s her selfish want. Pankaja realizes that Shivya is telling the truth and decides to move on.

Simran confesses her love to Naman, which Naman also reciprocates. Naman admits that Simran reminds him of Sunaina. Naman proposes to Simran in front of the whole family.

Naresh confesses his love to Kumud and apologizes for everything. Naresh hugs Kumud and Simran, and the show ends in a happy note with everyone dancing. Sunaina’s spirit fondly watches her family and hopes her family’s new chapter will be filled with happiness.

== Cast ==
=== Main ===
- Niharika Chouksey as
  - Sunaina Singh: Transgender; Naresh and Kumud's daughter; Simran’s twin sister; Naman's love interest turned wife (2023–2024) (Dead)
  - Simran "Simmi" Singh: Sunaina's twin sister; Naresh and Kumud’s daughter; Preeto’s friend; Naman’s fiancée (2024)
- Farman Haider as Naman Singh: Rajkumari and Uday's son; Sunaina's widower; Pankaja's ex-fiancé turned ex-second husband; Simran’s fiancée (2023–2024)

=== Recurring ===
- Jyoti Mukherjee as Kumud Singh: Naresh's wife; Simran and Sunaina's mother (2023–2024)
- Sachal Tyagi as Naresh "Babusaheb" Singh: Kumud's husband; Pravesh's brother; Simran and Sunaina’s father (2023–2024)
- Aishani Yadav as Shivya Singh: Pravesh and Ramola's younger daughter; Pankaja’s sister (2023–2024)
- Mihir Rajda as Pravesh Singh: Ramola's husband; Naresh's brother; Pankaja and Shivya's father (2023–2024)
- Sonia Singh as Ramola Singh: Pravesh's wife; Pankaja and Shivya's mother (2023–2024)
- Juhi Singh Bajwa as Pankaja “Panku” Singh: Ramola and Pravesh's daughter; Shivya’s sister; Naman's ex-fiancée turned ex-second wife; Sunaina’s murderer (2023–2024)
- Geeta Tyagi as Rajkumari Singh: Uday's wife; Naman's mother (2023–2024)
- Rakesh Pandey as Uday Singh: Rajkumari's husband; Suraj's brother; Naman's father (2023–2024)
- Prachi Thakkar as Meghna Singh: Suraj's wife (2023–2024)
- Moni Rai as Suraj Singh: Uday's brother; Meghna's husband (2023–2024)
- Neha Dandale as Maharani: A transgender goon (2023–2024)
- Alka Singh as Doctor (2024)
- Shashank Mishra (2024)
- Sakshi Khandal as Ritu (2024)
- Mansi Arora as Manyatha (2024)
- Shubhi Sharma (2024)
