= Zee Cinestars =

- Promotional logo
- Created by: Zee Network & Optimystix Entertainment
- Presented by: Aman Verma
- Judges: Anupam Kher; Pooja Bhatt; Madhur Bhandarkar
- Opening theme: "Zee Cinestars"
- Country of origin: India
- No. of episodes: Total 37

Production
- Running time: Approx. 52 minutes

Original release
- Network: Zee TV
- Release: 3 November 2006 – 10 March 2007

Related
- India's Best Cinestars Ki Khoj

Idea Zee Cinestars was a popular talent-hunt reality show that began its second season after the success of its first season show India's Best Cinestars Ki Khoj on Zee TV channel in 2006. The second season of the show was produced by Optimystix Entertainment. The show went on air in the first week of November and had its Grand Finale in March 2007 at a glittering 2 hour ground event that was televised live.

== Concept ==
The show's main concept was to find Bollywood's next superstar from among the contestants. It followed a reality/talent show format where contestants displayed their talent to viewing audiences who could then vote for their choice of the next potential Bollywood star.

Zee Cinestars became a platform for Indian youths seeking careers acting in the movie industry. It was a 1 hour talent hunt show;featuring participants from various cities, who showcased their acting and dancing skills. The goal was to find two potential stars, whose prize was an opportunity to feature in a forthcoming film from a leading company.

This reality series is split into various stages and will essentially showcase the ecstasy, trauma, victory and defeat through 18 weeks. The hunt will narrow down to 2 Best performers from the entire nation. 60 participants will be brought down to Bombay – ‘The City of Dreams’, where, over the weeks they will begin to get eliminated, until only two winners are left. The 60 participants are grouped as couples who will be groomed by Bollywood’s popular Directors and Choreographers. The Best couple is chosen by the viewers who have been voting for their favourite performers, through the weeks. This journey to fame is interwoven with the trials and tribulations of the participants who are thriving to be introduced to Hindi Cinema as actors.

Jury

- Aman Verma (Host)
- Anupam Kher (Judge)
- Pooja Bhatt (Judge)
- Madhur Bhandarkar (Judge)

Winners of Zee Cinestars 2007

- Piyush Chopra --- Group B
- Sabina Sheema --- Group B (http://www.missmalini.com/2013/12/11/exclusive-sabina-sheema-on-acting-with-dimple-kapadia-in-what-the-fish/)

Runner-up Zee Cinestars 2007

- Gaurav Bajpai --- Group B Yeh Vaada Raha (TV series)
- Chandani Desai --- Group B

== Contestants ==
=== Group A ===
- Aadil Sharma
- Mamta Dutta
- Manav Sharma
- Pallavi Dutt
- Mrityunjay Nigam
- Piku Sharma
- Rahul Manchanda
- Rakhi Verma
- Rizwan Sikander
- Ritwika Ghoshal
- Sahil Arora
- Varsha Lodh
- Rati Pandey
- Varun Jaiswal

=== Group B ===
- Aalesha Syed
- Ajay Chabria
- Ashif
- Chandani Desai
- Gaurav Bajpai
- Kanchan More
- Hardik Soni
- Minal Gorpade
- Kartik Shetty
- Rachel Gurjar
- Prabhjot Dhillon
- Surod Rizvi
- Rohit Raghav
- Piyush Chopra
- Raj Saluja
- Ruchika Babbar
- Sabina Sheema
- Vinay Kamble

== Additional information ==
- The auditions of the 2nd season were held in Mumbai, Pune, Kanpur, Haryana, New Delhi, Ranchi, Varnasi, as well as internationally in United States and UK.
- Some of the top Bollywood celebrities that participated in the show were Anil Kapoor, Juhi Chawla, Fardeen Khan, Rakhi Sawant, Shilpa Shetty, Esha Deol, Bappi Lahiri, and many more.
