= Amrita Prakash =

Indian television actress

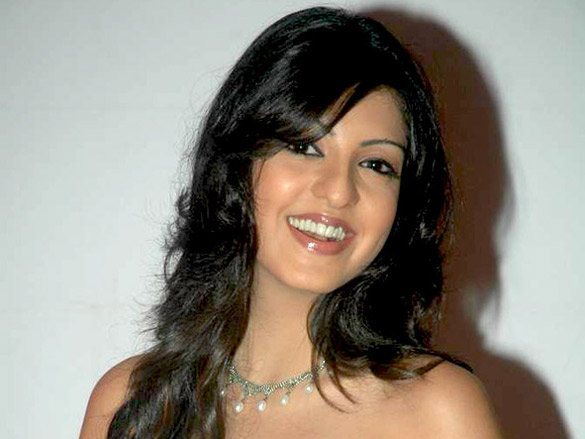
- Born: Amrita Prakash; Jaipur, Rajasthan, India
- Education: The University of Mumbai
- Occupations: Actor; model

Amrita Prakash is an Indian film actress. She began her acting career when she was four years old, and has acted in both Bollywood and Malayalam films. She has since, been seen in a myriad of Bollywood Films, TVCs and television reality and fiction shows.

== Early life and career ==
Amrita was born to Prakash Bakshi, who is the chairman of the National Bank for Agriculture and Rural Development. She holds a master's degree in Commerce and Business Administration from The University of Mumbai.

Amrita started her career as a four year old, with advertising. Her first TVC was for a local footwear company in Kerala. After which, over the course of her childhood she did over 50 commercials for prominent brands including Rasna, Ruffles Lays, Glucon-D, Dabur, etc. She was the face of Lifebuoy Soaps packaging for over two years. More recently she has been seen in commercials for Sunsilk, Gitts Processed Foods, etc.

Her stint with television started when she was 9 years old with a drama show in which she played Gautami Gadgil's niece. Right after which she bagged her own show when she was seen anchoring Fox Kids, a cartoon show on Star Plus for about 5 years, making her character of Miss India hugely popular, especially amongst the kids.

She gained popularity with her first film in 2001 - Anubhav Sinha's Tum Bin, where she played the pivotal part of Milli. Post Tum Bin, Amrita continued with television. When she was 14, she was chosen to be part of India's first reality show titled Kya Masti Kya Dhoom which she co-anchored alongside Bollywood Actress Sonali Bendre for over two years.

Her last television drama, where she played one of the lead protagonists was Har Ghar Kuch Kehta Hai for Zee TV.

In 2004, she appeared in Malayalam film Manjupoloru Penkutty directed by Kamal. The story focused around a 16-year-old school girl in Kerala who was tormented by and rose against her sexually abusive stepfather. The film was dubbed and re-released in Kannada and Telugu. Amrita was nominated by the State for the National Awards as Best Actress.

She went on to do one of her most defining roles with Rajshri Films, playing the character of Chhoti in Sooraj Barjatya's Vivah. Her performance in Vivaah was hugely appreciated by critics. Amrita has repeatedly been quoted saying- "Vivaah was one amongst the biggest milestones and turning points of my career. I cannot be grateful enough to him (Sooraj Barjatya) for being the teacher and guide he has been to me through and since the film. And for bringing me onto the map of every city in India."

Amrita played the character of Sandhya in Ek Vivah Aisa Bhi. She played a small part in Dharma Productions' We Are Family.

She took up the show Ek Rishta Aisa Bhi for Sony Pal. She played the lead protagonist, Dipika on the show.

== Filmography ==
=== Films ===
| Year | Title | Role |
|---|---|---|
| 2001 | Tum Bin | Milli |
| 2002 | Maine Dil Tujhko Diya | Mini |
| 2004 | Manjupoloru Penkutti | Nidhi |
| 2005 | Koi Mere Dil Mein Hai | Soni |
| 2006 | Vivah | Rajni "Chhoti" |
| 2008 | Ek Vivaah... Aisa Bhi | Sandhya |
| 2010 | We Are Family | Aaliya |
| 2011 | Na Jaane Kabse | Anjali |
| 2013 | The World of Fashion | Ganga |

=== Television ===
| Year | Title | Role | Notes |
|---|---|---|---|
| 1999–2004 | Fox Kids | Miss India | |
| 2002 | Kya Hadsaa Kya Haqeeqat | Mishti Chatterjee | |
| 2001 | Smriti | Avantika | |
| 2003-2005 | Tum Bin Jaaoon Kahaan | Neelu Mathur | |
| | A Walk In Your Shoes | Herself | |
| | Kya Masti Kya Dhoom | Host | |
| | Ye Meri Life Hai | Simone | |
| | Saat Phere: Saloni Ka Safar | Pia | |
| | C.A.T.S. | Soni | |
| | Rishtey | Tanvi | |
| | Kashmeer | Mehek | |
| 2008 | Har Ghar Kuch Kehta Hai | Sanskriti Thakral | |
| 2011-2012 | Jhoome Naache Gayein | Host | |
| 2012 | Hum Ne Li Hai- Shapath | Priya | |
| 2013 | Gumrah: Season 2 | Aaliya Mehra | |
| 2013 | C.I.D. | Shanaya/Meghna | |
| 2013 | Savdhaan India | Naina/Anshi/Meher Hayat | Episode 1236/2174 |
| 2014 | Yeh Hai Aashiqui | Tabbasum | |
| 2014 | Gumrah Season 3 | Aaliya | |
| 2014 | Love by Chance | Arundhati Seth | |
| 2014-2015 | Ek Rishta Aisa Bhi | Dipika | |
| 2015 | Halla Bol Season 2 | Aanchal | |
| 2015 | Akbar Birbal | Princess Aishwarya | |
| 2015 | Pyaar Tune Kya Kiya | Kiran | |
| 2016 - 2017 | Men will be Men | Tara | |
| 2017 | Mahakali | Mohini | |
| 2018 | Shakti - Astitva Ke Ehsaas Ki | Jasleen | |
| 2020 | Patiala Babes | Isha Oberoi | |

=== Music video ===
- Humnava (2024) - sung by Gaurav Sharma
