= Sonia Singh =

Indian television actress

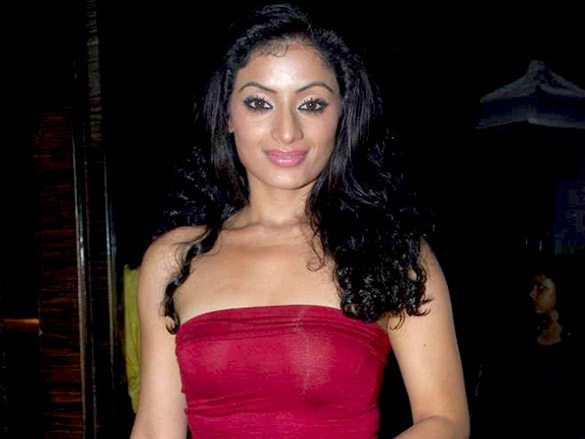
- Occupation: Actress
- Years active: 2003–present
- Spouse: Avinash Bobby (m. 2002)

Sonia Singh is an Indian television actress. She is known for her role as Dr. Keerti Mehra in Dill Mill Gayye, Richa Thakral in Parichay, Sushma "Sush" in Bhabhi and Antara in Kumkum – Ek Pyara Sa Bandhan.

== Television ==
Year	Serial	Role
2003	Kya Hadsaa Kya Haqeeqat	Episode 74 - Episode 98
2003	Kya Hadsaa Kya Haqeeqat	Neha (Episode 142 - Episode 159)
2004	Shaka Laka Boom Boom	Trinetri
2005	Prratima	Anamika Roy
2005–2006	Hare Kkaanch Ki Choodiyaan	Pooja Vikram Singhania
2006	C.I.D.	Rita (Episode 401 & Episode 402)
2006	C.I.D.	Riya (Episode 417)
2006	Vaidehi	Anita
2006	Tumhari Disha	
2006–2007	Bhabhi	Sushma "Sush" Vishal Chopra
2006–2007; 2007– 2008	Kumkum – Ek Pyara Sa Bandhan	Advocate Antara Dhruv Wadhwa
2007	Saat Phere: Saloni Ka Safar	Tanya
2007 - 2008	Ssshhhh...Phir Koi Hai	Episode 32
2007 - 2008	Ssshhhh...Phir Koi Hai	Surbhi (Episode 34)
2007 - 2008	Ssshhhh...Phir Koi Hai	Viveka Sharma (Episode 37)
2007 - 2008	Ssshhhh...Phir Koi Hai	Episode 44
2007 - 2008	Ssshhhh...Phir Koi Hai	Episode 86 & Episode 87
2007 - 2008	Doli Saja Ke	Juhi
2007 - 2009	Naaginn	Kanak Singh
2007 - 2010	Dill Mill Gayye	Dr. Keerti Mehra / Dr. Keerti Shubhankar Rai
2010	Jyoti	Neelam Pankaj Vashisht
2010	Chotti Bahu - Sindoor Bin Suhagan	Kanika Abhay Singh Thakur
2010	Adaalat	Episode 4
2010 - 2011	Bhagyavidhaata	Kamini Prem Sinha
2011	Yahaaan Main Ghar Ghar Kheli	Koyal Singhania / Koyal Ashmit Kapoor
2011	Veer Shivaji	Rambha Naikin / Janabai
2012 - 2013	Parichay — Nayee Zindagi Kay Sapno Ka	Richa Thakral
2013	Jhilmil Sitaaron Ka Aangan Hoga	Angana (Angie) Saumya Chauhan
2016	Swaragini - Jodein Rishton Ke Sur	Urvashi
2016	Darr Sabko Lagta Hai	Pisachini (Episode 45)
2016 - 2017	Ichhapyaari Naagin	Vaishnaini
2017	Savdhaan India	Aparna (Episode 1982)
2017	Sher-e-Punjab: Maharaja Ranjit Singh	Sada Kaur
2018	Laal Ishq	Pisachini (Episode 22)
2018 - 2019	Vikram Betaal Ki Rahasya Gatha	Pingla
2018 - 2019	Kaal Bhairav Rahasya Season 2	Revati Singh
2019	Manmohini	Makdi Rani
2019	Dar Ki Dastak - Kaale Kauwe Aur Sandook	Deepali (Episode 1)
2019 - 2020	Phir Laut Aayi Naagin	Ragini
2017-2020	Vighnaharta Ganesh	Vrinda/Aditi
2020	Devi Adi Parashakti	Diti
2020–2021	Hero – Gayab Mode On	Bindu Ranjeet Sidhwani
2022	Ghum Hai Kisikey Pyaar Meiin	Anuradha Luthra
2022	Brij Ke Gopal	Kaputha
2022–2023	Faltu	Kanika
2023–2024	Aaina – Roop Nahin, Haqeeqat Bhi Dikhaye	Ramola
2024–2026	Kakabhushundi Ramayan – Anasuni Kathayein	Maharani Kaikeyi
2025–2026	Ganesh Kartikey	Varangi

=== Web series ===
Year	Show	Role
2020	Call Centre	
2022	Patra Petika	Bindiya
