= Rang De Basanti (2024 film) =

- Directed by: Premanshu Singh
- Story by: Manoj Kushwaha
- Produced by: Roshan Singh
- Starring: Khesari Lal Yadav; Rati Pandey; Diana Khan
- Music by: Om Jha
- Production company: SRK Music Private Limited
- Release date: 7 June 2024
- Country: India
- Language: Bhojpuri

Rang De Basanti is a 2024 Indian Bhojpuri-language Patriotic film directed by Premanshu Singh and produced by Roshan Singh and Sharmila R. Singh under SRK Music Private Limited. Written by Manoj Kushwaha, the film stars Khesari Lal Yadav in the lead role. Rati Pandey (her Bhojpuri debut) and Samarth Chaturvedi are in the supporting roles.

Principal photography commenced in March 2023 with filming taking place in Kashmir. Daler Mehndi and Richa Sharma have sung for the film. With a budget of 3 crores, it is one of the most expensive Bhojpuri films.

== Cast ==
- Khesari Lal Yadav As Shiwam and Amar
- Rati Pandey As Gauri
- Samarth Chaturvedi
- Diana Khan As Aarti
- Amit Tiwari
- Mir Sarwar
- Feroz Khan
- Raj Premi
- Sujan Singh

== Production ==
=== Development ===
This film is produced by Roshan Singh and is made with a budget of 8 crores, which makes it one of the most expensive Bhojpuri films.

=== Casting ===
Rati Pandey was finalized as the female lead opposite Khesari Lal Yadav, making her Bhojpuri cinema debut.

=== Filming ===
Principal photography started in March 2023 in Kashmir. Most of the film was shot in Kashmir. This film had the most expensive song ever shot in Bhojpuri, whose budget is INR 75 Lakhs. 400 crew members were involved in the production of the song along with 250 dancers.

== Music ==
Music of the film was produced by Om Jha. Four songs from the film is sung by Daler Mehndi. Richa Sharma Jitesh Shankar Priyanka Singh have also sung for this film.

== Marketing ==
A preview of the film was held on 26 November 2023.

== Release ==
The film was released on 7 June 2024.
