= Abhishek Rawat =

Indian television actor (born 1980)

- Born: Uttarakhand, India
- Education: MBA
- Occupation: Actor
- Years active: 2007–present
- Known for: Agle Janam Mohe Bitiya Hi Kijo; Dekha Ek Khwaab Kaamnaa
- Spouse: Anjali Menon

Abhishek Rawat is an Indian actor. He is best known for portraying the role of Manav Vajpayee in Kaamnaa.

== Career ==
Rawat's first show was Neelanjana, in which he played a cameo role. His landed his second role in Babul Ka Aangann Chootey Na and portrayed Mahem. Then he received his first major role as Shekhar Singh in Agle Janam Mohe Bitiya Hi Kijo. In Mann Kee Awaaz Pratigya, Rawat portrayed Tanmay. He has also appeared in a short film titled Kissss.

== Television ==
Year	Serial	Role	Notes
2007–2008	Neelanjana		Cameo Role
2008–2009	Babul Ka Aangann Chootey Na	Mahem	
2009–2011	Agle Janam Mohe Bitiya Hi Kijo	Shekhar Singh	Lead Role
2011–2012	Mann Kee Awaaz Pratigya	Tanmay Srivastav	Negative Role
2011–2012	Dekha Ek Khwaab	Akash Verma / Aryan Rai Chaudhary	Negative Role
2014	Baawre	Nikumbh	Lead Role
2015	Service Wali Bahu	Dev	Lead Role
2016	Married Woman Diaries	Rishi	Sony LIV original
2018	Tenali Rama	Kalluri Dinkar	Cameo Role
2018	Laal Ishq	Karan (Episode 10)	Episodic Role
2018	Married Woman Diaries: Phase 2	Rishi	Season 2
2021	Choti Sarrdaarni	Mr. Kaul	Cameo Role
2021–2022	Ziddi Dil Maane Na	Major and Special Agent Param Shergill	Cameo Role (appears only in pictures and flashbacks)
2021–2022	Kaamnaa	Manav Vajpayee	Lead Role
2023–2024	Neerja – Ek Nayi Pehchaan	Kaushik Bagchi	Negative Role
2025–2026	Binddii	Saurav Chaturvedi	Supporting Role

== Filmography ==
Year	Film	Role	Notes	Ref
2007	Good Boy, Bad Boy	College student	Debut film	
2017	Kissss		Short film	
2019	Motichoor Chaknachoor	Hakim Tyagi	Supporting role	
2020	Bhoot – Part One: The Haunted Ship	Sundar		
