= Khushi Dubey =

Indian television actress

- Occupations: Actress; Model
- Known for: Aankh Micholi; Jaadu Teri Nazar – Daayan Ka Mausam
- Notable work: Aashiqana
- Height: 5 ft 3.5 in (1.61 m)

Khushi Dubey is an Indian television actress. She has acted in various TV shows like Naaginn, Kaisa Ye Pyar Hai, Baa Bahoo Aur Baby, Kasamh Se and Rakhi, Atoot Rishtey Ki Dor. She also appeared in the film Bombay Talkies. She also played the role in the film Dil Dhadakne Do.

== Career ==
Khushi Dubey started acting at the age of 4 and has acted in various TV shows such as Naagin, Kaisa Yeh Pyaar Hai, Baa Bahoo Aur Baby, Kasamh Se and Rakhi- unbreakable relationship. She played the role of Naman Jain's sister in the 2013 film Bombay Talkies. She also played the role of Putlu Mehra in the 2015 film Dil Dhadakne Do.

== Filmography ==
=== Television ===
Year	Title	Role	Notes	Ref.
2007–2009	Naaginn	Child Amrita/Child Sanchi Singh/Child Shivali Singh	Lead role	
2022–2023	Aashiqana	Chikki Sharma	Lead role	
2024	Aankh Micholi	IPS Rukmini Jadeja Thakkar	Lead role	
2025	Jaadu Teri Nazar – Daayan Ka Mausam	Gauri Sharma	Lead role	

== See also ==
- List of Hindi television actresses
- List of Indian television actresses
