= Shaadi Mubarak =

Indian drama television series

- Genre: Drama
- Created by: Shashi Mittal
- Screenplay by: Harneet Singh
- Story by: Seema Mantri
- Directed by: Ashish Srivastava
- Creative director: Neha Kothari
- Starring: Manav Gohil; Rati Pandey
- Opening theme: Iktara by Kavita Seth
- Composer: Rajiv Bhatt
- Country of origin: India
- Original language: Hindi
- No. of seasons: 1
- No. of episodes: 206

Production
- Producers: Sheetal Somani; Om Gehlot; Sumeet Hukamchand Mittal; Shashi Mittal
- Cinematography: Vishal Desai
- Editor: Jay B Ghadiali
- Camera setup: Multi-camera
- Running time: 20–22minutes
- Production company: Shashi Sumeet Productions

Original release
- Network: StarPlus
- Release: 24 August 2020 – 20 April 2021

Shaadi Mubarak (transl. Congrats on the Marriage) is an Indian drama television series produced by Shashi Sumeet Productions. It premiered on 24 August 2020 on Star Plus. The series stars Rati Pandey and Manav Gohil.

== Plot ==
Preeti, a simple and caring woman, wishes to earn self-respect by working as a wedding planner after her son, Tarun, and his wife, Rati, deserted her and threw her out of the house. On the other hand, KT, who appears happy, hides a deep wound within. When Chanda Rathore, a prospective bride for KT, insults him because he rejected her, KT's uncle Sushant motivates him to work again. KT offers a partnership to Preeti, which she initially declines but later agrees to. They start a business 'Shaadi Mubarak'. They face many issues in their initial days of business, which leads them to develop a bond of friendship, trust, and respect.

Tarun puts forth a challenge before Preeti where, in 25 days, she will have to prove herself capable of becoming a businesswoman. With KT's help, she wins the challenge. While organising their uncle and aunt's 50th wedding anniversary, many misunderstandings lead to Preeti to breaking her partnership with KT after finishing an event with a mysterious client.

On the day of the wedding event, the mysterious client turns out to be KT's ex-wife, Nandini. To get his revenge, KT marries Preeti. But Preeti knows that their relationship is based on respect for each other. After their marriage, Preeti falls in love with KT, and they collaborate to discover Nandini's motive. KT is caught in a fire lit by Nandini but is rescued by Preeti.

Nandini is arrested but vows to return. Later, Tarun and Arjun apologize to Preeti for mistreating her. Preeti then confesses her love to KT. He initially tells Preeti that he loves her, too but he confessed to his friend Neel that he had lied. Following this, Preeti and KT both agree to a divorce. When Preeti leaves for Mumbai, KT realizes he is in love with her. Desperate to win her back, KT rushes to Preeti and declares his love for her publicly, and they reconcile.

Preeti gets diagnosed with ovarian cancer. KT and Preeti long for a child so they choose Phurti, a carefree bubbly girl who dreams of settling in London, as a surrogate in return for sending her to London.

Phurti becomes pregnant with KT and Preeti's child through IVF. Preeti introduces Phurti as her sister to the family as she begins to live in the Tibrewal Mansion. The Tibrewals are in turmoil following the revelations regarding Phurti's pregnancy as KT accepts the baby as his and Preeti's. After some tension, the family eventually accepts the surrogacy situation.

=== Eight months later ===
Juhi finds an oncologist that can cure Preeti. While KT and Preeti's baby shower occurs, Kushaala finds Preeti in pain after slipping in the bathroom and admits her to the hospital. After seeing Preeti at the cancer hospital in Delhi on the news, KT confronts Juhi, revealing Preeti's illness. Phurti goes into premature labor and delivers a girl.

Preeti's surgery is successful, but she is suffering from amnesia. The cancer hospital catches fire. Preeti helps a pregnant Shikha and is taken in by her and her husband, Vishal. Priyanka gives birth to her son, Beer.

KT has an emotional outburst when he does not find Preeti. Vishal and Shikha go to the hospital to find out about Preeti's family, but some confusion leads them to think that Preeti is a different patient, Mohi Bansal. Shikha delivers a baby girl but asks Mohi to take care of her after an accident. KT stops his family from performing Preeti's last rituals and states that she will return.

=== 5 Years Later ===
KT is an RJ and a doting father to his and Preeti's daughter, Kirti. Preeti, who still thinks she is "Mohi", moves to Udaipur. Shikha and Vishal's daughter, also named Preeti, and Kirti is admitted to the same school. Kirti, not knowing that Mohi is her mother, dislikes her when she makes her clean the school floor. Preeti hates KT when he gets her fired after Kirti complains to him about her. Preeti calls KT to confront him about his decision, but he does not answer, so she goes to the Tibrewal mansion. The Tibrewals are happily celebrating Holi well KT feels Preeti's presence and searches for her.

KT encounters Preeti asks him to retract his complaint. KT learns about Preeti's past and befriends her, but he hides his identity and goes by the name "Keertan". Preeti accepts Keertan's request to join Shaadi Mubarak, but after learning that the owner is none other than KT she immediately declines the job offer. Keertan makes her realize that KT is not a bad person and she joins the office. KT is frozen to his place after Kirti gets stuck in a fire and remembers the hospital incident.

Preeti rescues her when KT scolds Kirti for not respecting Preeti. Vishal plans vengeance on Preeti for separating his daughter from him. Preeti suspects Keertan's intentions after he takes KT's side whenever he lands into trouble. The series ends on a cliffhanger; as it is unknown whether or not, if Preeti has finally regained our all of her memories.

== Cast ==
=== Main ===
- Rajshree Thakur/Rati Pandey as Preeti Tibrewal (née Jindal)
- Manav Gohil as Keertan "KT" Tibrewal
- Puvika Gupta as Preeti Agrawal: Vishal and Shikha's daughter
- Barbiee Sharma as Kirti Tibrewal: KT and Preeti's daughter

=== Recurring ===
- Rajeshwari Sachdev as Kusum Kothari
- Shefali Singh Soni as Juhi Jindal Kothari
- Sandeep Mehta as Jay Prakash "JP" Tibrewal
- Dolly Minhas as Kushaala Tibrewal: JP's wife
- Manu Malik as Sushant Tibrewal: JP's brother
- Priyamvada Singh as Sneha Tibrewal: Sushant's wife
- Kabeer Kumar as Neel "NT" Tibrewal: Sneha and Sushant's son
- Aleya Ghosh as Priyanka "Pihu" Kothari Tibrewal: Kusum's eldest daughter
- Gaurav Sharma as Tarun Jindal: Preeti's son
- Akansha Sareen as Rati Jindal: Tarun's wife
- Naman Gor as Arjun "AT" Tibrewal: KT and Preeti's adoptive son
- Achherr Bhaardwaj as Sumedh Kothari: Kusum's son
- Nisha Rawal as Chanda Rathore
- Barkha Sengupta as Nandini Chitrubal: KT's ex-wife
- Pracheen Chauhan as Vishal Agrawal: Shikha's widower
- Ayushi Bhatia as Aastha Kothari: Kusum's second daughter
- Trupti Mishra as Kajal "Choti" Kothari: Kusum's youngest daughter
- Ashish Kaul as Mr. Nathmal
- Vaishnavi Mahant as Mrs. Gopalani
- Rohit Suchanti as Aryan Mantri
- Nasir Khan as Mr. Mantri: Aryan's father
- Heli Daruwala as Tiya: Dancer at Aryan's cocktail party
- Ashwini Shukla as Sheena: Shaadi Mubarak's secretary
- Neelu Vaghela as Bua: Preeti's former aunt-in-law
- Yashodhan Bal as Fufa: Preeti's ex-uncle-in-law
- Dnyanada Ramtirthkar as Phurti: Kirti's surrogate mother
- Shweta Gulati as Shikha Agrawal: Vishal's late wife
- Deepak Soni as Inspector Deshmukh
- Ahmad Harhash as Ruhaan Jindal: Tarun and Arjun's brother

== Production ==
The shooting of the series was supposed to begin in March 2020. However, due to the COVID-19 outbreak in India the series shooting was postponed. After four months, the shooting of the series began in July 2020. The first promo was released on 30 July 2020 featuring the leads and premiered on 24 August 2020 at 7:30 pm time slot on StarPlus.

On 16 September 2020, the shoot was stalled after Rajeshwari Sachdev tested positive for COVID-19. Sachdev shot for her sequences from her home until she recovered. The show took a five-year leap on 28 March 2021. On 21 April 2021, due to the sudden halt in the series' shooting, its 7.30 slot was given to another StarPlus show, Pandya Store.

On 13 April 2021, Manav Gohil tested positive for COVID-19. On the same day, Chief Minister of Maharashtra, Uddhav Thackeray, announced a sudden curfew from 15 April 2021, and the series' shooting was halted. Later, it was reported that the show would be shifted to Bikaner to continue shooting. After many discussions with the team about further shooting, the producers decided to wait until lockdown in Maharashtra is lifted and then continue shooting once Gohil recovers.. There were also news that show will shift at 11:00 PM, as Pandya Store shifted at 7:30 PM to fulfill the slot. Finally, it was decided that show will not return, and on 20 April 2021, the last episode of the show was broadcast and show went off air abruptly.

=== Casting ===
Initially, Kabeer Kumar was cast for playing the character of Preeti's son, Tarun. However, he was replaced by Gaurav Sharma in July 2020. Later, he was offered the role of Keertan's cousin.

In the middle of October 2020, lead actress Rajshree Thakur quit to take care of her health, mentioning the hectic schedule of the series and was immediately replaced by Rati Pandey. Thakur played her role for 54 episodes.

== Reception ==
The Times of India stated, "Rajashree Thakur's fight to earn respect, Manav Gohil's charismatic presence and Rajeshwari Sachdev steals the show."
