= Agle Janam Mohe Bitiya Hi Kijo =

Indian television series

- Created by: Siddharth Kumar Tewary
- Written by: Kamlesh Kunti Singh Virendra Shawhney; Mrinal Jha; Shanti Bhushan; Anshuman Sinha; Sharad Tripathi; Sonali Jaffar
- Directed by: Rajesh Ram Singh; Ranjan Kumar Singh; Ranjeet Gupta
- Starring: Ratan Rajput as Lekha "Laali"; Abhishek Rawat as Shekhar; Sudesh Berry as Loha; Mukul Harish as Madhur; Richa Mukherjee / Dipika Kakar as Rekha; Sukirti Kandpal as Siddheshwari
- Theme music composer: Dony Hazarika
- Composer: Dony Hazarika
- Country of origin: India
- Original language: Hindi
- No. of seasons: 1
- No. of episodes: 423

Production
- Producers: Siddharth Kumar Tewary; Gayatri Gill Tewary
- Production company: Swastik Pictures

Original release
- Network: Zee TV
- Release: 16 March 2009 – 12 February 2011

Agle Janam Mohe Bitiya Hi Kijo (Let me be a daughter in my next life) is an Indian television series. It premiered on 16 March 2009 on Zee TV. It starred Ratan Rajput, Abhishek Rawat, Sudesh Berry, Mukul Harish, Richa Mukherjee, Dipika Kakar, Aditya Lakhia, Roopa Ganguly and Sukirti Kandpal. The show was produced by Siddharth Kumar Tewary of Swastik Pictures.

== Plot ==
Laali, a poor teenage girl, lives in a small village in the Indian state of Bihar with her parents, two younger sisters, and a brother. They belong to the Musahar caste and live at the bottom of the social hierarchy. They go through many trials and tribulations. Laali and her father must support the family with little or no money. Laali was married as a child to Ganesiya and had not yet had her gauna (the ritual in which a married woman leaves her parents and goes to live with her husband).

A man named Balli goes around her village, offering money in return for poor girls. In a moment of desperation, Laali's parents agree to sell her to save their ailing son. Laali is sold to the rich Zamindar, Thakur Loha Singh (Sudesh Berry), who wants to use her to bear an heir. Laali's parents lie to her that she is being sent to her husband Ganesiya through a Gauna ceremony, which includes repeating the marriage ceremony.

When she arrives at Thakur Loha Singh's estate, she is introduced to “Ganesiya.” Laali thinks that her husband is a servant on the Thakur estate. In reality, her “husband” is Shekhar (Abhishek Rawat), Thakur Loha Singh's younger son. Shekhar is married to Siddeshwari (Siddhi) who cannot bear children. Siddeshwari (Sikirti Kandpal) is immature and materialistic, but Shekhar is in love with her. He feels guilty about deceiving Laali, but Siddeswari, feeling guilty about being barren, encourages Shekhar to give his father the male heir he desires.

Thakhur Loha Singh's older son is Ranvijay Singh (Sachal Tiyagi) is married to Nandini (Surbhi Tiwari). They have twin girls. Thakur Loha Singh has given up hope that his older son can give him a male heir, so he has moved on to Shekher. Loha Singh's wife Sumitra (Roopa Ganguly) is timid and is afraid of Loha Singh's anger.

Also living on the Thakur estate are Gangia Suryavanshi (Sushmit Mukherjee) and her daughter Jamuni (Vindhya Tiwari). They both work on the estate. Gangia is Loha Singh's occasional mistress. While Gangia is constantly planning against Laali, Jamuni becomes good friends with Laali.

When Laali sees Siddhi with Shekhar, she thinks the two are having an affair. When she confronts them, she finds out that she is the second wife, not Siddhi. She is shattered.

Now with the rouse out in the open, Loha Singh gives an ultimatum to Shekhar, Laali, and Siddhi: He wants a grandson. Laali is tied to the cowshed when she tries to run away. When Shekhar and Laali continue to disobey Loha Singh's order to mate, he moves Siddhi to the outhouse and moves Laali to Siddhi's bedroom.

Fed up, Shekhar decides to steal jewels and run away with his wife. Laali takes the blame for the theft. When Siddhi finds out Shekhar's plan, she refuses to go with him. She does not want to leave the mansion and her fancy jewels to live with Shekhar in uncertainty. She encourages Shekhar to give his dad what he wants. This breaks Shekhar's heart as he realizes that Siddhi is more fond of her jewelry and clothes than she is of him.

When Shekhar returns home, he finds his brother trying to mutilate Laali's fingers on charges of theft against his mother's instructions. All this happens when Loha Singh is away on a thirthayatra. Shekhar saves her and the two become close.

In the meantime, Loha Singh and Sumitra Devi's daughter, Ratna arrive with her aunt (bua) to her parental home for a vacation. Ratna takes an instant dislike for Laali, sensing her control over her brother, Shekhar, to whom she is extremely close. She wants to join a college for higher studies but is prevented from doing so by her aunt and father, who start looking for a groom for her. They soon find one — the son of a state-level minister, who is a criminal and childhood friend of Shekhar's.

At first, Ratna, attracted by his parents' wealth and prestige, wants to marry him, but on the day of the wedding realises the mistake she had made. A fight ensues in which Mukul, to whom Ratna is engaged, brandishes a knife at Ratna. Her mother, Sumitra, by mistake, shoots Mukul and Ratna, killing them. Laali, who is a witness to the scene, once again takes the blame and is arrested.

Shekhar at first believes the charges against her but later realizes that she has taken the blame for saving his mother. She is jailed and is presumed dead in a car accident. Eventually, Shekhar saves her, but continues to dislike her, hurt by her complicity in his sister's death.

Then, Sumitra disappears, having been kidnapped by Gangiya (the household maid, who is also Loha Singh's mistress), Siddeshwari, and Ranvijay because she had heard them talking about Siddheswari giving a gun to Ratna. One day at a mandir, Nandini is shocked to see Laali; she tells Laali about Sumitra and takes her to her in-laws' mansion as a servant. Laali attempts to find Sumitra. Gangiya, Siddeshwari, and Ranvijay go in to kill Sumitra, who is now hidden in a storeroom but find that she has left. Laali then shows herself to Shekhar, who is shocked and tries to throw her out. She swears by her unborn child that she is only here to find Sumitra. Shekhar is shocked to know that Laali is pregnant and decides to help her by forcing Siddeshwari out of the house.

Soon Laali has her son. Ranvijay and Gangiya plan to kill the baby but fail. Laali wants to breastfeed her son, but Loha Singh refuses to allow that. In anger Laali threatens Loha Singh with a knife, to which he responds by threatening her with a gun; the situation is resolved when Loha Singh eventually gives his permission. Shekhar then invites Laali's family to live in the mansion because of a misunderstanding regarding the death of Laali's sister Rekha's husband. Rekha then meets Shekhar's cousin, Madhur, who falls in love with her, and they plan to marry. In the meantime, Gangiya plots to burn down the mansion, she instigates Jamuni and tells her to marry Ranvijay. Jamuni follows her mother's orders and she burns the mansion. She escapes while everyone else tries to get out. Laali and Loha Singh know that Gangiya is responsible. They find her and threaten her with a gun, but she throws chili powder in Loha's eyes and blinds him temporarily. Shekhar seeing Loha Singh with the gun in his hands wrongly thinks that he means to shoot Laali. He tries to shoot his father but accidentally shoots Laali. She falls down a cliff and is presumed dead. But she is alive. The next day, a funeral is held for Nandini, Siddhi, the younger of her twin daughters, and Laali.

Shekhar is mentally ill because of losing Laali. Although it is revealed that Seven years later, she is alive but has no memory of the past. She is rescued by some villagers and the doctor, whose wife dies but before she does she tells him to marry Laali because she is a good woman and had helped them a lot and saved his daughters many times, although he never does because he does not know of her past, Laali begins to think that the story of the patient the doctor told her has something to do with her and somehow finds the flute familiar, since then she begins to remember some corrupted bits of her past.

Time passes but in the end, Laali after going to Loha's Mansion asks him to tell him the truth about her past if he knew it but he says that he knows nothing, but then she pushes him into telling her and he agrees and suggests to re-act what happened to make her remember and he does that.

Loha Singh now wants to become the Sarpanch of the village, for which he lobbies the MLA of the constituency into which his village falls. The MLA is first skeptical of him, but Loha Singh promises muscle power to the MLA, who comes to his house for dinner and demands either Laali and Jamuni in return for the post of Sarpanch. The girls go into hiding and Loha Singh sends out Ranvijay to find them. Laali hides Jamuni inside the mansion. Loha Singh forces Gangiya to tell him where Laali is. She confesses and Sumitra attempts to stop Loha from getting her. Loha slaps Sumitra, who had strayed into her husband's den of criminals, and supposedly kills her. She is not killed, kept alive by Gangiya, and continues to harass him as a ghost, even as he campaigns for the Sarpanchship. She even influences a local policeman to help Laali and Shekhar file Laali's candidacy for the post of Sarpanch. Eventually, Sumitra comes out of her hiding, forcing her husband to confess to all his crimes. He is sent to jail by the present Sarpanch, an elderly man of the village, and Laali is elected as the Sarpanch unopposed. Loha however is now helped by the MLA who brings him out of jail and asks him to deal with Laali. He returns to his home and instigates the villagers against her, causing a rift between Laali and her sister Rekha. But the rift does not last long since Siddheswari's sister, Surabhi Singh, the only surviving member of her family, which had been burnt in a fire, comes to Loha Singh's house in the guise of a doctor who had been injecting Laali with syringes that makes her mentally insane and thinking that she's Siddheswari, conspires to set the house on fire once again. The house is set on fire, killing Surabhi, and no one else. Suman who had been behaving oddly with Laali comes to her senses and agrees to return to her father's home, leaving Madhur to marry Rekha finally.

In the middle of all this Laali again gets pregnant. A dance party comes to their house to celebrate the occasion. At that dance party is Riddhi, Ranvijay's long-lost elder daughter, who was removed from the mansion when Ranvijay and Jamuni took it over. At first, Loha Singh and Ranvijay, not knowing who she is, try to shoo her away with some money. But she refuses to go. Laali finds out about her from an orphanage where she had been staying in earlier and rescues her with the help of Shekhar from a local goon called Kallu Bajrangi. In the ensuing fight Loha Singh, who had earlier shown her the door even after knowing who she was, is finally overcome by emotion and shoots Kallu Bajrangi, who had in a show of power burnt down Loha's anaj.

The show ends with Laali and Shekhar and their two children sitting in front of a tree with "Shekhar-Laali" carved into its bark!

== Cast ==
=== Main ===
- Ratan Rajput as Lekha "Laali" Prasad Singh: Nanku and Majri's daughter, Rekha and Munna's sister, Ganesia's former wife, Shekhar's wife (2009–2011)
- Abhishek Rawat as Shekhar Singh: Sumitra and Loha's son, Ranvijay's brother, Siddhi's former husband, Laali's husband (2009–2011)

=== Recurring ===
- Sudesh Berry as Thakur Loha Singh: Ayodhya's son, Mazboot's brother, Sumitra's husband, Madhur's uncle, Ranvijay and Shekhar's father (2009–2011)
- Mukul Harish as Madhur Singh: Mazbut's son, Rekha's lover (2010–2011)
- Richa Mukherjee / Dipika Kakar as Rekha Prasad: Nanku and Majri's daughter, Laali and Munna's sister, Madhur's lover (2009-2011)
- Sukirti Kandpal as Siddheshwari "Siddhi" Singh: Shekhar's first wife (2009–2010)
- Aditya Lakhia as Narayan "Nanku" Prasad: Majri's husband; Laali, Rekha and Munna's father
- Tuhina Vohra / Nupur Alankar as Manjari "Majri" Prasad: Nanku's wife; Laali, Rekha and Munna's mother
- Sushmita Mukherjee as Gangia Suryavanshi: Loha's mistress, Jamuni's mother(Antagonist)
- Vindhya Tiwari as Jamuni Suryavanshi: Gangia's daughter
- Manav Gohil as Dr. Shailendra Kumar
- Fatima Sana Shaikh as Suman
- Roopa Ganguly as Sumitra Singh: Loha's wife, Ranvijay and Shekhar's mother
- Karmveer Choudhary as Sarpanch
- Karan Veer Mehra as Ganesia Sardesai: Laali's former husband (2009)
- Sachal Tyagi as Ranvijay Singh: Loha and Sumitra's son, Shekhar's brother, Nandini's husband
- Surbhi Tiwari as Nandini Singh: Ranvijay's wife
- Deepak Jethi as Doman Singh
- Shakti Arora as Mukul
- Charu Asopa as Surabhi
- Ankita Sharma as Ratna
- Achyut Potdar as Ayodhaya Singh, father of Loha Singh
- Kannan Arunachalam as Kallu Bajrangi
- Anupam Shyam as Balli

== Broadcast ==
- Arabic dubbed version was broadcast on Zee Aflam in 2013 under the name (لالي Arabic for Laali), and was split into two seasons, Laali 1 and Laali 2. Some scenes from the episodes were missing or cut out. It ended on 23 March 2013.
- The show was dubbed in English and aired on Zee World on DStv
- The show was broadcast on BTV and is currently rebroadcast on Bhojpuri Channel in Mauritius in its original version
- The show is dubbed in French on Antenne Reunion in Reunion Island as Laali.

== Awards ==
BIG Television Awards 2011

- Khatarnak Character Male (Fiction) - Sudesh Berry as Loha Singh

Zee Rishtey Awards 2009

- Favourite Bhai - Ranvijay
- Favourite Saas-Bahu - Sumitra & Laali
- Favourite Parivaar - Loha Singh Parivaar
- Popular Female Face Of The Year - Laali

2009 9th Indian Telly Awards

- Popular Actor Negative Male - Loha Singh
- Popular Actor Female - Laali
- Best TV Lyricist - Yogesh Vikrant
- Best Title Singer for a TV Show - Richa Sharma

2009 Kalakaar Awards

- Best Actor (Female) - Ratan Rajput as Laali

2011 Global Indian Film & TV Honours

- Best Director - Rajesh Ram Singh

2009 ITA Awards

- Best Serial (Drama) - Agle Janam Mohe Bitiya Hi Kijo
- Best Actress - Ratan Rajpoot as Laali
- Best Actor In A Negative Role (Male) - Sudesh Berry as Loha Singh
- Best Actor In A Supporting Role - Adithya Lakhia
- Best Music Composer - Dony Hazarika for Shekhar Laali Love Theme

2010 ITA Awards

- Best Director - Rajesh Ram Singh
