= Binddii =

Indian television series

- Genre: Family drama
- Created by: Palki Malhotra
- Story by: Bahnishikha Das
- Directed by: Aniruddha Rajderkar
- Starring: Shruti Choudhary; Aashay Mishra
- Country of origin: India
- Original language: Hindi
- No. of seasons: 1
- No. of episodes: 115

Production
- Producer: Palki Malhotra
- Cinematography: Indranil Singha
- Editor: Vinay Mandal
- Camera setup: Multi-camera
- Running time: 20–25 minutes
- Production companies: Street Lamp Studios; Beehive Productions

Original release
- Network: Colors TV
- Release: 17 September 2025 – 16 January 2026

Binddii- Dil Se Daring is an Indian Hindi-language television family drama series that aired from 17 September 2025 to 16 January 2026 on Colors TV and streams digitally on JioHotstar. Produced by Palki Malhotra under Street Lamp Studios and Beehive Productions, the series is a remake of the Telugu drama Chinni from Star Maa. It starred Sanchi Bhoyar, Manav Gohil, Radhika Muthukumar, Krushal Ahuja, Shruti Choudhary and Aashay Mishra in the lead roles.

== Cast ==
=== Main ===
- Shruti Choudhary as Binddii "Binita" Mathur: Kajal and Aviraj's daughter; Shubham and Laadli’s cousin (2025–2026)
  - Sanchi Bhoyar as child Binddii (2025)
  - Rivanshi Thakur as young Binddii (2025)
- Aashay Mishra as Mahi Pathak: Pallavi and Dayanand's son; Devika’s step-son; Dhruv’s half-brother (2025–2026)
  - Gantavya Sharma as child Mahi (2025)
- Manav Gohil as Dayanand "Bhaiyya Ji" Pathak: Pallavi's widower; Devika's husband; Mahi and Dhruv’s father; Pallavi, Sharad, Kajal and Aviraj’s murderer (2025-2026)
- Radhika Muthukumar as Kajal Chaturvedi / Kajal Aviraj Mathur: Saurav's sister; Aviraj's wife; Binddii's mother (2025)
- Krushal Ahuja as Aviraj Mathur: Dayanand's former aid; Kajal's husband; Binddii's father (2025)

=== Recurring ===
- Rati Pandey as Pallavi Pathak: Sharad’s sister; Dayanand's first wife; Mahi's mother (2025)
- Sapna Thakur as Devika Pathak: Dayanand's second wife; Dhruv's mother; Mahi's step-mother (2025-2026)
- Sid Mandhyan as Dhruv Pathak: Devika and Dayanand's son; Mahi's half-brother (2025–2026)
- Abhishek Rawat as Saurav Chaturvedi: Kajal's brother; Sudha's husband; Shubham and Laadli's father (2025-2026)
- Harleen Kaur Rekhi as Sudha Chaturvedi: Saurav's wife; Shubham and Laadli's mother (2025-2026)
- Isha Narayan Singh as Laadli "Latika" Chaturvedi: Saurav and Sudha's daughter; Shubham's sister; Binddii's cousin (2025–2026)
  - Ananya Gambhir as child Laadli (2025)
- Hardik Mehta as Shubham Chaturvedi: Saurav and Sudha's son; Laadli's brother; Binddii's cousin (2025)
- Niel Satpuda as Veeru: Mahi's friend (2025–2026)
- Pankaj Vishnu as Mr. Chaturvedi: Saurav and Kajal's father (2025)
- Nick Lath as Nandu (2025-2026)
- Preet Kaur Nayak as Advocate Damini Thakur: Kajal's lawyer (2025-2026)
- Achint Kaur as Bharati Khanna: Superintendent at Tihar Jail (2025–2026)
- Shweta Padda as Kanchan Kataria: Head warden at Tihar Jail (2025)
- Geetika Shyam as Sejal Rathwa: Jailer at Tihar Jail (2025)
- Manoj Chandila as Sharad: Pallavi’s brother; Mahi’s uncle (2025)

== Production ==
=== Casting ===
Sanchi Bhoyar were reportedly confirmed to play child Binddii. Krushal Ahuja was signed to play Aviraj. Manav Gohil was reportedly cast Dayanand Pathak.
