= Kaamnaa =

Indian television series

- Genre: Drama; Romance
- Based on: Meray Paas Tum Ho
- Written by: Vishal Watwani; Renu Watwani Anand Vardhan
- Screenplay by: Vishal Watwani; Renu Watwani
- Story by: Anand Vardhan
- Directed by: Mahim Joshi
- Creative director: Pushpa Porwal
- Starring: See below
- Theme music composer: Nishant Raja
- Opening theme: Jab Koi Baat Bigad Jaye by Nishant Raja
- Composer: Nishant Raja
- Country of origin: India
- Original language: Hindi
- No. of seasons: 1
- No. of episodes: 185

Production
- Producers: Rajesh Ram Singh; Pradeep Kumar; Pia Bajpai; Shaika Parween
- Editors: Sagar Patil; Manish Upadhyay
- Camera setup: Multi-camera
- Running time: 19-21 minutes
- Production companies: Cockrow Entertainment; Shaika Films

Original release
- Network: Sony Entertainment Television
- Release: 15 November 2021 – 29 July 2022

Kaamnaa (transl. Desire) is an Indian Hindi-language television series that premeried on 15 November 2021 on Sony TV. Produced by Cockcrow and Shaika Entertainment, it starred Abhishek Rawat, Manav Gohil, Chandni Sharma and Ramnitu Chaudhary. The initial story of Kaamnaa was inspired by the hit Pakistani television series Meray Paas Tum Ho. The series ended on 29 July 2022.

== Plot ==
Manav, a hardworking and straightforward government officer, follows his principles with complete honesty. In contrast, his wife Akanksha desires to lead a luxurious life with everything she wants. Despite not getting everything, they wish for, the two are happy with their son, Yatharth. All goes well until a businessman, Vaibhav Kapoor, who believes anything can be bought by money, falls in love at first sight with Akanksha, his Kaamnaa (translation: wish or desire) as he likes to call her, without knowing her real identity.

Manav transfers from Bhopal to Indore and patches things up between Akanksha and her family. Akanksha shares her past with Manav and reveals that she was once Miss Indore, but only because her father bribed the judges. Vaibhav gets closer to Akanksha by buying her old bungalow and even offering her a job to model his company with extra perks. Still, Manav disapproves of this as he suspects Vaibhav's intentions. After some time, Akanksha falls in love with Vaibhav, leaving Manav shattered.

Akanksha's leave worsens Yatharth's mental health, where Sakshi, his school counselor, helps him. Sakshi's husband, Prateek, and son, Parth, died in a car accident and has affected her since. Sakshi sees Parth in Yatharth, forcing her to leave the school after interfering with Manav and Akanksha's sole guardianship of Yatharth. After losing everything, Manav feels guilty and lets Sakshi and her mother-in-law, Malti stay with them for the sake of Yatharth.

Manav wins legal guardianship of his son after Mr. Holkar shows sympathy for him and realizes his past mistakes. Akanksha gets paranoid when she can't find any way to get Yatharth to be with her, even after asking Vaibhav for help which he denies since he hates kids. Things get chaotic after she kidnaps Yatharth at school and eventually makes way to the court. Vaibhav hates Akanksha for ruining his image when he left for America while Akanksha pretends to still love Vaibhav but actually wants to get 50% of his property and wealth. They make a mutual agreement to stay together only for the sake of getting revenge on Manav. After facing many false accusations, with the help of a retired and blind lawyer, Mr. Shenoy, Manav wins the case.

Manav moves into a new house and becomes the chief executive officer (CEO) of Holkar Industries to get revenge on Vaibhav for ruining Mr. Holkar and Ayesha's lives after Niharika's dismay. Manav finds out about Prateek and Parth from Malti aunty and tells him how they lost Prateek and Parth during a car accident. Manav is shocked to hear Sakshi went through so much. After a lot of convincing Sakshi moves in with Manav and Yatharth. All goes well until someone announces Sakshi as Manav's wife. Yatharth and Ayesha's plans on bringing them closer but all in vain. Manav and Sakshi find out about this, and they decide to part ways. Sakshi realizes she has feelings for Manav, but she doesn't say anything. Yatharth's mental health decreases drastically and stops attending school and breaks his friendship with Ayesha. Manav panics when he can't find a balance between work and his personal life and realizes how desperately he needs Sakshi.

Akanksha does whatever it takes to get Yatharth with her but fails desperately. Manav and Sakshi become friends after he warns her about her future groom, after having an awkward meeting with him. Things take a drastic turn when Yatharth has a bike accident and Vaibhav takes advantage and burns all of the files against him. At this point, Manav feels helpless, but a priest brings his hopes high after informing him that Niharika is alive. Manav and Mr. Holkar discovers that Vaibhav has hidden Niharika for seven years at an abandoned place for safekeeping. The day has come for Vaibhav and Akanksha's wedding where strange things occur, but this doesn't stop Akanksha from marrying Vaibhav. Everyone finally sees that Niharika is alive, and this was all part of Manav's plan. Vaibhav, having no choice, expels Akanksha from the house and office. Vaibhav is jailed and Akanksha visits him. At last, Vaibhav tells Akanksha his evil deeds to obtain her, but in reality, she is worthless. Despite everyone's warnings, Akanksha continues to interfere in Manav and Yatharth's lives as she has nowhere else to go. Manav and Sakshi realize their love for each other and gets engaged. Akanksha deliberately gets into a road car accident which Manav is blamed for and is arrested after Vaibhav informs the police about him trying to murder her. Akanksha gets Manav out of jail by giving a statement in his favor to gain entry into his life again. Vaibhav tries to strangle Niharika to death but she catches him doing so immediately. After Niharika explains to him about his obsession towards money and has left him with nothing, Vaibhav reforms himself and leaves to repent for his sins. Akanksha realizes her mistakes and leaves the house. Manav marries Sakshi.

== Cast ==
=== Main ===
- Abhishek Rawat as Manav Bajpayee – Akanksha's ex-husband; Sakshi's second husband; Yatharth's father (2021–2022)
- Chandni Sharma as Akanksha "Akku" Awasthi/ Kaamnaa – Manav's ex-wife; Yatharth's mother; Vaibhav's ex-fiancée (2021–2022)
- Manav Gohil as Vaibhav Kapoor – Akanksha's ex-fiancé; Niharika's ex-husband (2021–2022)
- Tanmay Rishi Shah as Yatharth "Yathu" Bajpayee – Akanksha and Manav's son; Sakshi's student/adopted son (2021–2022)
- Ramnitu Chaudhary as Sakshi Verma Bajpayee – Manav's second wife; Yatharth's teacher/adoptive mother (2022)

=== Recurring ===
- Tasneem Ali as Swati Awasthi – Akanksha, Kavita and Karan's mother; Yatharth's grandmother (2021–2022)
- Jitendra Bohara as Karan Awasthi – Akanksha's brother (2021–2022)
- Komal Sharma as Kavita Awasthi – Akanksha's elder sister (2021–2022)
- Nisha Gupta as Babli Awasthi – Karan's wife; Akanksha's sister-in-law (2021–2022)
- Ananya Dwivedi as Ayesha Holkar – Niharika's daughter; Yatharth's friend (2021–2022)
- Shilpa Kadam/ Gauri Tonk as Niharika Holkar – Vaibhav's ex-wife; Mr. Holkar's elder daughter; Ayesha's mother (2021–2022)
- Unknown as Malti Verma – Sakshi's mother-in-law; Prateek's mother (2022)
- Unknown as Mr. Choksi – Kaushal and Amita's boss; Manav's previous boss (2021-2022)
- Ashwin Kaushal as Kaushal – Manav's neighbor and former co-worker (2021–2022)
- Naina Birthare as Leena – Kaushal's wife (2021–2022)
- Khushboo Sawan as Ekta – Leena's friend (2021–2022)
- Anuja Walhe as Amita – Manav's friend and former co-worker; Vinay's mother (2021–2022)
- Aahil Sayyad as Vinay – Amita's son; Yatharth's friend (2021–2022)
- Nidhi Seth as Meera Singhania – Vaibhav and Akanksha's former lawyer; legal advisor to Holkar Industries (2022)
- Jitendra Trehan as Mr. Holkar – Niharika's father; Ayesha's grandfather (2021–2022)
- Ansha Sayed as Sangini Holkar – Mr. Holkar's younger daughter; Niharika's sister (2021)
- Shivani Kothari as Maya Xaviers – Akanksha's mentor; Vaibhav and Akanksha's cupid (2021–2022)
- Vinod Kapoor as Rane – Vaibhav, Niharika and Mr. Holkar's personal assistant (2021–2022)
- Nidhi Bhavsar as Riya – Akanksha's friend; Ansh's wife (2021)
- Nitish Parashar as Ansh – Manav's friend; Riya's husband (2021)
- Muni Jha as Mr. Shenoy - Mr. Holkar's friend; Manav's mentor and lawyer (2022)
- Unknown as Prateek Verma – Malti's late son; Sakshi's late husband; Parth's father (2022) (Dead)
- Unknown as Parth Verma – Prateek and Sakshi's late son; Malti's late grandson (2022) (Dead)
- Priyanka Bedi as School Principal Ma'am – Yatharth's and Ayesha's school principal (2022)
- Kirti Sually as Yashoda Dadi – Yatharth's caretaker (2022)
- Mukund Kapahi as Anurag – Sakshi's obsessive lover (2022)
- Unknown as Dr. Kale – Vaibhav's crime partner; Niharika's kidnapper (2022)

== Production ==
=== Casting ===
Abhishek Rawat was cast to portray the lead Manav.

Chandni Sharma was cast as the lead Akanksha, her character later turns negative. Ramnitu Chaudhary was then cast as the new lead Sakshi.

=== Release ===
Kaamnaa premeried on 21 November 2021 on Sony Entertainment Television. The promos of the show were directed by actor Gajraj Rao.

== Awards and nominations ==
Year	Award	Category	Recipient	Result	Ref.
2022	Gold Awards	Debut in a Lead Role (Female)	Chandni Sharma	Pending	
2022	22nd Indian Television Academy Awards	Best Actress (Drama)	Ramnitu Chaudhary	Pending	
2022	22nd Indian Television Academy Awards	Best Actor (Drama)	Abhishek Rawat	Pending	
2022	22nd Indian Television Academy Awards	Best Serial (Drama)	Kaamnaa	Pending	

== See also ==
- List of programs broadcast by Sony Entertainment Television
