= Har Ghar Kuch Kehta Hai =

Hindi television serial

- Created by: Shreya Creations
- Written by: Anshuman Sinha
- Directed by: Pawan Sahu
- Starring: See below
- Narrated by: Nikhilesh Sharma
- Opening theme: "Har Ghar Kuch Kehta Hai" by Shreya Ghoshal
- Country of origin: India
- No. of seasons: 1
- No. of episodes: 184

Production
- Running time: Approx. 22 minutes

Original release
- Network: Zee TV
- Release: 16 July 2007 – 18 April 2008

Har Ghar Kuch Kehta Hai (transl. Every home says something) is a Hindi television serial that aired on Zee TV from 16 July 2007 to 18 April 2008. It was based on the story of 3 girls: Prarthna, Sidhhi, and Sanskriti. Even though they all have different lives and a different outlook of life, destiny is not always on their side, and when the unexpected happens their dreams, hopes and desires come crashing down.

== Plot ==
First, the story focuses on the lives and different belief systems of the three main protagonists - Prarthana, Siddhi and Sanskriti.

Prarthana (Rati Pandey) is an orphan nurtured by her uncle and aunt. Her only desire is to have a traditional arranged marriage into a happy joint family. Prarthana hopes that one day she will walk into a house that is full of warmth and love.

Prarthana's cousin Siddhi (Aanchal Anand) is a vibrant and independent girl who has lived abroad most of her life. Siddhi cannot understand the concept of an arranged marriage, nor can she tolerate being surrounded by people all the time. She believes that one must marry one's true love.

Sanskriti (Amrita Prakash) is a model by profession, very straightforward and blunt in her attitude. Sanskriti can't understand the concept of marriage at all. She doesn’t believe that marriage can hold two people closer than love can. She vouches for a live-in relationship.

== Cast ==
- Rati Pandey as Prarthana Singh / Prarthana Akshay Thakral
- Aanchal Anand as Siddhi Gyan Kapoor
- Amrita Prakash as Sanskriti Thakral
- Vineet Raina as Akshay Thakral
- Nasir Khan as Vishal Thakral
- Puneet Sachdev as Rajeev
- Rio Kapadia as Ranveer "Rio" Thakral
- Meghna Malik as Swarna "Su" Ranveer Thakral
- Yash Sinha as Prem Thakral
- Shabnam Mishra as Tarana Vishal Thakral
- Ridheema Tiwari as Shalini Prem Thakral
- Sachin Shroff as Gyan Kapoor
- Alok Nath as Baldev Kapoor
- Niyati Joshi as Mrs. Kapoor, Baldev's wife & Gyan's mother
- Hemant Choudhary as Khan Chacha
- Nigaar Khan as Mohini
- Rocky Verma as Tapori-Gunda
- Piyush Sahdev as Varun
- Shweta Gautam as Gyan's Aunt
- Yusuf Hussain as Mr. Singh
- Vineeta Malik as Mrs. Singh
- Shivani Gosain as Renuka Alok Singh
- Sonali Naik as Mrs. Ashok Singh

== Production ==
The serial was re launched with new episodes on 7 September 2013 on Colors channel. It was produced by the Indian division of BBC Worldwide and featured homes of such celebrities as Govinda, Waheeda Rehman, Irfan Pathan, Sakshi Tanwar and Ila Arun among others. The new show also introduces the viewer to a new host, Vinay Pathak.

In 2014 Asian Paints released a commercial which was focused on the joys of homemaking in the world of Har Ghar Kuch Kehta Hai. The 22-second long commercial episodes were produced by Ogilvy India agency in partnership with Bang in the Middle.

Following the commercials, it revealed by Sony Entertainment that they bought the rights on airing the first season of the serial on their own TV channel, with second and third seasons released in 2015.
