= Farman Haider =

Television actor

- Born: 23 December 1994 (age 31)
- Years active: 2017–present
- Known for: Saavi Ki Savaari; Jagadhatri
- Parent: Shabana Haider (mother)

Farman Haider is an Indian actor who primarily works in Hindi television. Haider is best known for his portrayal of Nityam Dalmiya in Saavi Ki Savaari and Shivaay Singh Deshmukh in Jagadhatri.

== Early life ==
Farman Haider hails from Moradabad, Uttar Pradesh. He had studied Bachelor of Legislative Law. He is a Muslim and ofter spoke about fasting in Ramadan.

He was in a relationship with his Aaina co-star Juhi Singh Bajwa for over 5 years, whom they already know each other for over 8 years from the sets of Vighnaharta Ganesha. The couple eventually broke up in June 2024.

== Career ==
Haider started his career with the show Rakshabandhan... Rasal Apne Bhai Ki Dhal in a parallel lead negative role, Samar Pratap Choudhary. Earlier, he had done episodic roles in Kasautii Zindagii Kay 2, Vighnaharta Ganesha, Aisi Deewangi and Namah Lakshmi Narayan. He landed his first project as a lead actor in Colors TV's Saavi Ki Savaari. He portrayed Naman Singh in Dangal's Aaina – Roop Nahin, Haqeeqat Bhi Dikhaye from December 2023 to April 2024. From 30 January to 15 June 2025, He portrayed Dr. Digvijay in StarPlus's family drama Pocket Mein Aasman.

Since November 2025, Haider is seen portraying an undercover agent and IPS officer Shivay Deshmukh in Zee TV's spy thriller drama Jagadhatri starring opposite Sonakshi Batra.

== Filmography ==
=== Television ===
Year	Title	Role	Notes	Ref.
2021–2022	Rakshabandhan... Rasal Apne Bhai Ki Dhal	Samar Kamal Pratap Choudhary		
2022–2023	Saavi Ki Savaari	Nityam Dalmiya		
2023–2024	Aaina – Roop Nahin, Haqeeqat Bhi Dikhaye	Naman Singh		
2025	Pocket Mein Aasman	Dr. Digvijay "Digu" Gandhi		
2025–present	Jagadhatri	Shivaay Singh Deshmukh IPS		
