= Pocket Mein Aasman =

2025 Indian family drama television series

- Genre: Slice of life
- Created by: Sushanta Das
- Based on: Tomader Rani by Ayan Chakraborty and Sayantani Bhattacharya
- Developed by: Sushanta Das
- Screenplay by: Divya Nayyar
- Story by: Vikas Tejpal Sharma
- Directed by: Anuj Mani Shukla; Vinod Rautela
- Creative directors: Divyanshi Tyagi; Srijeeta Tiwari
- Starring: Farman Haider; Abhika Malakar
- Country of origin: India
- Original language: Hindi
- No. of seasons: 1
- No. of episodes: 137

Production
- Executive producers: Jay Mishra; Prafull Kumar Pati
- Producers: Sushanta Das; Gurjit Singh; Surinder Singh
- Cinematography: Indranil Singha
- Camera setup: Multi-camera
- Running time: 20 minutes
- Production company: Boyhood Productions

Original release
- Network: Star Plus
- Release: 30 January – 15 June 2025

Pocket Mein Aasman is an Indian Hindi-language romantic family drama television series that aired from 30 January to 15 June 2025 on Star Plus and streams digitally on JioHotstar. Produced by Sushanta Das, Surinder Singh and Gurjit Singh under the banner of Boyhood Productions, it stars Farman Haider and Abhika Malakar. It is the official Hindi remake of Star Jalsha's Bengali series Tomader Rani, also produced by Das under Tent Cinema.

== Plot ==
Pocket Mein Aasman follows the emotional journey of Rudrani "Rani," a determined woman who navigates the challenges of love, early motherhood, and her ambition to build a medical career despite intense societal and familial opposition. After facing a painful separation following manipulation by Anisha and a five-year time jump, Rani eventually reunites with Dr. Digvijay Gandhi, exposes Anisha's wrongdoings, and finally achieves her dream of becoming a qualified doctor.

== Cast ==
=== Main ===
- Farman Haider as Dr. Digvijay "Digu" Gandhi: Anisha's Ex Boyfriend; Rudrani's husband; Dhwani's Father
- Abhika Malakar as Rudrani "Rani" Doshi Gandhi : Digvijay's Wife; Dhwani's Mother

=== Recurring ===
- Yesha Harsora as Anisha: Digvijay's one sided obsessive lover; Rani's arch enemy
- Shahnawaz Hussain as Sagar Doshi
- Jiten Lalwani as Manohar Doshi
- Devv Kumar as Anant Doshi
- Sandhya Mehta as Neha Doshi
- Salman Shaikh as Dr. Soham: A gynaecologist who supports Rudrani
- Mansi Chandwani as Payal
- Sonali Pandey as Sneha Pawar
- Ronik Sharma as Roshan Gandhi: Elder brother of Digvijay
- Sucheta Khanna as Narayani Gandhi
- Paaras Madaan
- Atarva T Hude: A college friend
- Devendra Dubey: Groom
- V.S. Prince Ratann
- Saurabh
- Suyash Biswas
- Juhi Pal
- Anshu Varshney
- Pooja Singh
- Govind Khatri
- Aishani Yadav

== Production ==
Farman Haider and Abhika Malakar were signed to portray the lead protagonists Digvijay and Rani respectively. Malakar had already starred in the original Bengali version and this marks her Hindi debut. The first promo was released on 1 January 2025. Yesha Harsora joined the cast as the negative lead. Ronik Sharma, known for Yeh Hai Chahatein was cast as Roshan. In April, Salman Shaikh entered the show as Dr. Soham. After the IPL 2025, even though the series maintained steady ratings of 0.9–1.3 in the early evening slot, the makers decided to wrap up the series entirely on 4 June.
