= Aashiqana =

Indian TV series

- Genre: Action; Drama; Thriller
- Created by: Gul Khan
- Directed by: Gul Khan
- Starring: Khushi Dubey; Zayn Ibad Khan
- Country of origin: India
- Original language: Hindi
- No. of seasons: 4

Production
- Production location: India
- Camera setup: Multi-camera
- Running time: 23-32 minutes
- Production company: 4 Lions Films

Original release
- Network: Disney+ Hotstar
- Release: 6 June 2022 – 9 September 2023

Aashiqana is an Indian Hindi-language drama television series directed by Gul Khan. The series features Khushi Dubey and Zayn Ibad Khan in the lead role. The first season premiered on Disney+ Hotstar on 6th June 2022.

== Cast ==
=== Main ===
- Khushi Dubey as Chikki Sharma
- Zayn Ibad Khan as ACP Yashvardhan Chauhan

=== Recurring ===
- Nirisha Basnett as Jia
- Inderjeet Modi as Raj
- Geeta Tyagi
- Vipul Deshpandey
- Anurag Vyas as Shyam
- Anshu Zarbade as Bani
- Sneha Chauhan as Payal
- Harshita Shukla as Mausi
- Parimal Bhattacharya as Shyam’s father
- Vikas Rai as Amit
- Kaveri Ghosh
- Vishal Josh's

== Episode list ==
Season	No. of episodes	Original air dates	
Season	No. of episodes	Premiere	Finale
1	66	6 June 2022	
2	60	10 October 2022	
3	60	27 February 2023	
4	42	24 July 2023	

== Reception ==
Archika Khurana from Times of India rated Season 1, 2 out of 5 and wrote, "Aashiqana is just another soap opera with the Bollywood tadka. However, it's a mediocre love story set against an intriguing thriller with outstanding production values. Only watch it if you have time to devote to it on a regular basis, as new episodes are released daily." Sunidhi Prajapat from OTT Play rated the Season 2, episode 1, 2.5 out of 5 and wrote "The plot and performances seem a little better than last season. However, the cliched dialogues and not-so-great screenplay reduce the marks."
