= Dolly Chaiwala =

Indian tea vendor and social media influencer

Pato Dolly Chaiwala
- Born: Sunil Pato Patil; December 27, 1998 (age 27); Nagpur, Maharashtra, India
- Occupations: Tea vendor; social media influencer

Sunil Patil (सुनील पाटिल) (born 27 December 1998), popularly known as Dolly Chaiwala, is an Indian tea vendor and social media personality. He gained national attention for his flamboyant tea-making style and distinctive persona.

Dolly's style and attire are inspired by South Indian cinema, the character Jack Sparrow played by Johnny Depp, and Rajinikanth's iconic gestures. Dolly went viral in February 2024 after a video showed him serving tea to Microsoft co-founder Bill Gates, leading to widespread media coverage and turning his tea stall, Dolly Ki Tapri, into a popular local attraction.

== Early life ==
Sunil Patil was born on December 27, 1998, in Nagpur, Maharashtra, India. His elder brother, Shailesh Patil, has supported him in his tea-selling ventures. He studied until the 10th grade at a local public school before dropping out due to financial difficulties. His nickname “Dolly” comes from a former girlfriend, and "Chaiwala" means tea vendor in Hindi, referring to his profession.

== Career ==
During his teenage years in the early 2010s, Patil began working at his elder brother's tea shop, where he learned the basics of tea preparation. He established his own tea stall, Dolly Ki Tapri, in 2017, located near the old VCA Stadium on Ravindra Nath Tagore Marg in Nagpur's Sadar area. Dolly Chaiwala's tea stall became popular in locals due to his tea-making techniques, which include pouring milk from a height and serving tea with swift, dramatic hand movements. Dolly has stated that his style is inspired by South Indian cinema, the character Jack Sparrow played by Johnny Depp, and Rajinikanth's signature gestures, all aimed at entertaining his customers.

Dolly Ki Tapri operates as a traditional roadside stall, open from early morning to late evening. It offers masala chai, ginger tea, and cutting chai, priced at approximately ₹7–10 per cup, with daily sales of 350 to 500 cups. The stall reportedly generates ₹1 lakh monthly revenue. His tea vending style and engaging personality have made 'Dolly Ki Tapri' a tourist attraction in Nagpur, with fans referring to him as the "Celebrity Chaiwala of India" and the "Jack Sparrow of India." In September 2023, Dolly appeared in the music video for the Hindi song "Tere Yaar Ka Time" by Vmc Rapper.

Dolly Chaiwala achieved popularity in February 2024 when a video of him serving tea to Bill Gates went viral. The video, shared by Gates on Instagram, showed Dolly preparing tea with his signature flair, with Gates commenting, “In India, you can find innovation everywhere you turn — even in the preparation of a simple cup of tea!” Dolly later revealed he was unaware of Gates' identity during the encounter, only learning about it the next day when the video gained widespread attention. Other notable visitors to Dolly Ki Tapri include Nayab Singh Saini, Ashish Vidyarthi, and Nimrat Kaur.

Dolly's tea stall has become a notable point of interest, drawing visitors from various places. India Today described it as “a modern-day pilgrimage”. Times Now stated that Dolly Chaiwala's success story is a testament to the power of perseverance and personal branding, inspiring countless young entrepreneurs across the country. Campaign Asia also highlighted his impact alongside the Chandrika Dixit aka Vada Pav Girl, writing that “their unique journey shows how localised content can resonate with a national, or even global, audience.”

In June 2024, Patil operated a temporary pop-up stall in the Maldives, serving tea to locals and tourists. In July 2025, Patil introduced a franchise model for Dolly Ki Tapri and received over 1,600 applications within 48 hours. In October 2024, Dolly Chaiwala joined the reality television show Bigg Boss 18 as a contestant.
