= Bigg Boss (Hindi TV series) season 18 =

Indian Reality Show (2024)

Bigg Boss
- Season 18
- Presented by: Salman Khan
- No. of days: 105
- No. of housemates: 23
- Winner: Karanveer Mehra
- Runner-up: Vivian Dsena
- No. of episodes: 107

Release
- Original network: Colors TV
- Original release: 6 October 2024 – 19 January 2025

Series chronology
- ← Previous; Season 17 Next → Season 19

Bigg Boss 18 also known as Bigg Boss: Time Ka Tandav was the eighteenth season of the Indian Hindi-language reality show Bigg Boss. It premiered on 6 October 2024 on Colors TV and JioCinema. Salman Khan hosted the show for the fifteenth time. However, for the fifth week of the season, Rohit Shetty hosted the Weekend Ka Vaar episodes (November 8 and 9, 2024) during Khan's absence. The grand finale of the season took place on 19 January 2025, where Karanveer Mehra emerged as the winner, while Vivian Dsena was declared as the first runner-up.

== Production ==
=== Promotions ===
Nia Sharma was announced as the first confirmed contestant during the Khatron Ke Khiladi 14 finale on 29 September 2024. However, she later revealed that she would not be participating in the show.

From 3 October to 5 October, promotional clips featuring Shilpa Shirodkar, Shehzada Dhami, Chahat Pandey, Vivian Dsena, Alice Kaushik, Gunratan Sadavarte and Eisha Singh, were released.

On 6 October 2024, the grand premiere promo showcasing Avinash Mishra was released. Additionally, a promo featuring Hrithik Roshan introducing Arfeen Khan and Sara Arfeen Khan were also released the same day.

=== Broadcast ===
Bigg Boss 18 weekdays episodes aired on 10 PM. The weekdays episode also includes Tandav Ka Overtime, which meant that the standard hour-long episode was extended with additional content to cover the house events. The weekend episodes, titled Weekend Ka Vaar aired at 9:30 PM hosted by Salman Khan. As in the previous two seasons, a special segment was also included, titled Haaye Daiya with Ravi Bhaiyya, Garda Udaa Denge hosted by Season 1 finalist Ravi Kishan.

=== Theme ===
The theme for this season is "Time Ka Tandav". Bigg Boss will play with time, he will see the contestants past, present and future.

=== Morning anthem ===
Like the last two seasons, this season also had a morning anthem titled Bigg Boss, Bigg Boss Happy, Happy Morning Hain instead of the usual wake-up songs. Later on, Wake-up Songs were brought back where the housemates were given a choice of 4 songs and had to choose one of them.

=== Eye logo ===
The color scheme of the eye combines blue, gold, and white. The design prominently includes a stylized eye at the center, which has a striking blue color with detailed textures, resembling an iris and pupil. Surrounding the eye is a circular clock motif, with gold outlines and clock markings, suggesting a theme of time or vigilance.

=== Release ===
The teaser was released on 16 September 2024 voiced by Salman Khan, announcing the arrival and theme of this season. On 22 September 2024, Colors TV released a new promo featuring Khan, marking his return to the show after absence in the OTT version while announcing the premiere date for the new season.

=== House ===
The house of this season had a "timeless cave and fort-like" theme. The house was located in Film City, Mumbai for the sixth time. The house had seven sections: living area, kitchen area, dining and sitting area, bedroom area, garden area, jail and confession room. A large Trojan horse structure is at the house's entrance. BB jail of the house resembled a cave, next to the bedroom. The swimming area has rocky surroundings and the bathroom was designed like a Turkish hammam. As in the two previous seasons, the house's entrance and exit were through a tunnel instead of the main door. The house was under the surveillance of 108 cameras.

== Housemates status ==
Sr	Housemate	Day entered	Day exited	Status
1	Karanveer	Day 0	Day 105	Winner
2	Vivian	Day 0	Day 105	1st Runner-up
3	Rajat	Day 0	Day 105	2nd Runner-up
4	Avinash	Day 0	Day 105	3rd Runner-up
5	Chum	Day 0	Day 105	4th Runner-up
6	Eisha	Day 0	Day 105	TOP 6( finalist)
7	Shilpa	Day 0	Day 102	Evicted
8	Chahat	Day 0	Day 98	Evicted
9	Shrutika	Day 0	Day 95	Evicted
10	Kashish	Day 28	Day 91	Evicted
11	Sara	Day 0	Day 84	Evicted
12	Edin	Day 44	Day 77	Evicted
13	Yamini	Day 44	Day 77	Evicted
14	Digvijay	Day 28	Day 75	Evicted By Housemates
15	Tajinder	Day 0	Day 70	Evicted
16	Aditi	Day 44	Day 56	Evicted By Housemates
17	Alice	Day 0	Day 49	Evicted
18	Arfeen	Day 0	Day 35	Evicted
19	Shehzada	Day 0	Day 28	Evicted
20	Nyrra	Day 0	Day 21	Evicted
21	Muskan	Day 0	Day 20	Evicted By Housemates
22	Hema	Day 0	Day 14	Evicted
23	Gunratan	Day 0	Day 10	Walked

== Housemates ==
The list of housemates in the order of entering the house:

18 Original entrants of season with host and eye logo

=== Original entrants ===
- Chahat Pandey – Actress She is known for her roles in Hamari Bahu Silk and Nath.
- Shehzada Dhami – Actor He is known for his role in Yeh Rishta Kya Kehlata Hai.
- Avinash Mishra – Actor He his known for his roles in Yeh Teri Galiyan, Yeh Rishtey Hain Pyaar Ke and Nath.
- Shilpa Shirodkar – Actress She worked primarily in Hindi language films in 1990's. In 2013, she made a comeback to acting with Ek Mutthi Aasmaan.
- Tajinder Bagga – Politician. He is a member of Bharatiya Janata Party.
- Shrutika Arjun – Actress and entrepreneur She previously acted in Tamil and Malayalam movies. She made a comeback with reality show Cooku with Comali (Season-3) finishing in first place.
- Nyrraa Banerjee – Actress. She is known for her roles in Divya Drishti and Pishachini. She also participated in Fear Factor: Khatron Ke Khiladi 13.
- Chum Darang – Actress and model. She was the winner of the beauty pageant Miss AAPSU and is known for her roles in Badhaai Do and Gangubai Kathiawadi.
- Karan Veer Mehra – Actor He is known for his roles in Pavitra Rishta and Ragini MMS 2. He also participated in Fear Factor: Khatron Ke Khiladi 14 finishing in first place.
- Rajat Dalal – Fitness influencer and former weightlifter.
- Muskan Bamne – Actress. She is known for her role in Anupamaa.
- Arfeen Khan – Life coach and motivational speaker. He is the husband of Sara Arfeen Khan.
- Sara Khan – Actress and wellness coach. She is the wife of Arfeen Khan.
- Eisha Singh – Actress. She is known for her roles in Ishq Subhan Allah and Sirf Tum.
- Gunratan Sadavarte – Lawyer. He is known for being involved in Maharashtra's "Maratha Aarakshan" case.
- Hema Sharma – Social media influencer and actress. She has gained recognition under the name "Viral Bhabhi".
- Vivian Dsena – Actor He is known for his roles Pyaar Kii Ye Ek Kahaani, Madhubala, Shakti and Sirf Tum. He also participated in the reality series Jhalak Dikhhla Jaa 8 and Fear Factor: Khatron Ke Khiladi 7.
- Alice Kaushik – Actress. She is known for her role in Pandya Store.

=== Wild card entrants ===
- Digvijay Singh Rathee – Reality TV alumnus. He is known for participating in MTV Roadies: Karm Ya Kaand and MTV Splitsvilla X5.
- Kashish Kapoor – Reality TV alumnus. She participated in MTV Splitsvilla X5.
- Aditi Mistry – Fitness model, influencer and actress
- Edin Rose – Actress and model. She is known for her roles Gandii Baat and Ravanasura.
- Yamini Malhotra – Actress and dentist. She made her small-screen debut with Ghum Hai Kisikey Pyaar Meiin.

== Twists ==
=== Bigg Boss "Top 2" prediction ===
On the Grand Premiere, Salman Khan revealed the top two finalists of the season to be Vivian Dsena and Alice Kaushik, predicted by Bigg Boss. If they both reached the finale, Bigg Boss would open the voting line only for them.

=== Jail punishment ===
Week	Days	Punishment by	Punishment given to	Special power	Ref.
1	1-5	Self	Hema and Tajinder	Control over the house ration	
2-3	11-20	Bigg Boss	Avinash	Control over the house ration	
3	18-20	Housemates	Arfeen	Control over the house ration	
3-4	20-26	Bigg Boss	Sara and Tajinder	Control over the house ration	
4-5	26-29	Time God	Rajat and Shrutika	Control over the menu	

=== Time ka Tandav ===
During Weekend Ka Vaar, a new activity room was introduced. This room of time will be always in present and helps housemates to take important decision based on what happened in past and what will be happen in future.

Week	Time	Contenders	Power	Ref.
1	Past	Alice; Vivian	Punish guilty housemates on past decisions	
2	Future	Rajat; Vivian	Throne of Control	
4	Future	Karanveer	To give his opinions on future decisions	
6	Future	Chum; Karanveer; Kashish; Rajat; Shrutika; Tajinder	To caution their friends by exposing someone in case they are eliminated	
7	Past	Alice; Avinash; Chaahat; Digvijay; Karanveer; Kashish; Vivian	Taking out anger on housemates who are nominated with them in case they are eliminated	

== Weekly summary ==
The main events in the Bigg Boss 18 house are summarised in the table below.

Week 1	Entrances	During the Grand Premiere, host Salman Khan welcomed new housemates and introduced them to audience. Chaahat, Shehzada, Avinash, Shilpa, Tajinder, Shrutika, Nyrraa, Chum, Karanveer, Rajat, Muskan, Arfeen, Sara, Eisha, Gunratan, Hema, Vivian and Alice entered house in order.
Week 1	Twists	On the Grand Premiere, Bigg Boss predicted that Chaahat would end up in jail, but she could change her fate by convincing two other housemates to take her place. If she failed, Chaahat would go to jail. After convincing Tajinder and Hema, Chaahat avoided jail, while Tajinder and Hema were sent to jail until further orders from Bigg Boss.; During the Grand Premiere, Bigg Boss also predicted that Vivian and Alice would be the top two contestants of the season, and that voting lines would only open for them if they both reach the finale.; On Day 2, Bigg Boss presented two options to the jailed Tajinder and Hema: a) they could gain control over ration by remaining in jail until further orders from Bigg Boss, or b) they could be released from jail and become ordinary housemates like the others. Tajinder and Hema chose option a, allowing them to control the ration while in jail. Ration supplies were sent from the storeroom to the jail, where they would be distributed as they saw fit.; On Day 4, Bigg Boss announced that jailmates Tajinder and Hema could be released if two other housemates took their place in jail. The first to go was Chaahat, who volunteered. Bigg Boss then asked all the housemates who supported the release of both Tajinder and Hema. Karanveer, Eisha and Avinash did not support their release. Consequently, Bigg Boss allowed them to choose another housemate to accompany Chaahat in jail. The three agreed on Gunratan, but he declined to go. As a result, since neither Chaahat nor Gunratan was imprisoned, Tajinder and Hema remained incarcerated.; On Day 5, Bigg Boss gave Tajinder and Hema the chance to be released from jail if they sacrificed all the rations currently present in the house, promising them daily basic rations. They both agreed to this arrangement and were released from jail, while all the rations were returned to Bigg Boss.; During the grand premiere, a donkey named Gadhraj was sent into the house, where he was tied in the garden near the smoking area. On Day 7, host Salman Khan announced the end of his presence in the house.
Week 1	Nominations	Maut Ka Farmaan On Day 3, the nomination process was held in the garden area, where all housemates' photos were displayed on the Maut Ka Farmaan board. First, each housemate nominated one contestant. Later, the archer would shoot an arrow at the photo of the nominated housemate. Any housemate who received three or more nominations would be nominated for eviction; those receiving less than three nominations would be safe. The archer had ten arrows, allowing housemates to nominate a maximum of ten contestants.
Week 1	Nominations	Chaahat, Gunratan, Karanveer, Muskan, and Avinash were nominated for the first week's weekend eviction process.
Week 1	Time God	None
Week 1	Tasks	On Day 1, Bigg Boss assigned a task to the housemates to earn rations. During this task, an hourglass was placed in the garden, where housemates in pairs needed to keep an eye on it while sitting on a horse. Each pair would first fill the sand kept near the hourglass up to the yellow line. They then needed to open a knob at the bottom to allow the sand to flow from the hourglass until it reached the red line mark. After that, the pair would stop the knob and hand it over to the next pair, who would repeat the same procedure. However, the housemates failed to comply with the rules. The first violation was by Shilpa, who fell asleep while watching the hourglass, and the second violation was Karanveer, who started the task alone instead of in a pair. As a result, Bigg Boss halted the task and announced that instead of 16 boxes of rations, he would only provide six boxes.
Week 1	Tasks	Task cancelled
Week 1	Sponsored	On Day 7, Bellavita gifted perfume to the housemates.
Week 1	Exits	On Day 7, there was no eviction. However Gadhraj was removed from the house.
Week 2	Twists	On Day 11, Following the hunger strike, Bigg Boss opened the confession room for the housemates and asked them to state one demand they wanted fulfilled to resolve their problems in the future. Later, Bigg Boss revealed that only Avinash, Shrutika, Tajinder, and Chum requested ration for all housemates. Bigg Boss announced he would provide the ration, but to receive it, the housemates needed to change one significant event from the past. The two events to consider were the release of Tajinder and Hema from jail and the absence of any eviction among the nominated housemates last week. Bigg Boss presented two options for the housemates to choose from: the first option involved selecting any two housemates to go to jail, and the second option was the eviction of one nominated housemate among Chaahat, Karanveer, Muskan, and Avinash. The housemates initially selected the first option but couldn't reach a decision. Eventually, they chose the second option, evicting Avinash by majority vote. Later, Bigg Boss announced that Avinash would exit the house, only to unexpectedly return to jail with control of the house's ration, which Bigg Boss granted in exchange for making the decision.
Week 2	Nominations	Tandav Express On Day 10, Bigg Boss announced that, as the Time God, Arfeen was safe from nominations and asked him for two names he wanted to nominate. He named Tajinder and Muskan. Later, Bigg Boss revealed that there would be a task involving a station named Khatra Nagari, where a train named Tandav Express had arrived. Only passengers carrying food items could board this train to become safe from nominations. The last two housemates to enter the train or the two housemates who remained at the station after the train's departure would be nominated. The shopkeepers distributing food items to the housemates in the first round would be Tajinder and Muskan, as they were nominated by Arfeen. In the subsequent rounds, the two housemates who were nominated would become the shopkeepers.
Week 2	Nominations	Muskan, Tajinder, Rajat, Chaahat, Avinash, Shrutika, Shilpa, Karanver, Hema, Alice were nominated for the second week's weekend eviction process.
Week 2	Time God Task	On Day 9, Bigg Boss assigned a task in the activity area for all housemates to compete for the title of the house's first Time God, who would have the power to change decisions from the past, present, and future, as well as control over time in the house. This role was more significant than that of the captain, who merely received immunity and some rights. The task was conducted in two rounds. In the first round, dolls representing nine of the eighteen housemates will be offered to the devil by any housemate. The housemates whose dolls were offered would be eliminated from the race to become the Time God. In the second round, dolls from the remaining nine housemates would be offered, with eight dolls being chosen by any housemate to be offered to the devil. The housemate whose doll was not offered would become the Time God. Arfeen's doll was safe, which allowed him to become the Time God.
Week 2	Time God	Arfeen
Week 2	Sponsored	On Day 12, Bellavita organized a task involving two teams, with Shilpa and Rajat judging them. Team A's skit depicted Shrutika and Vivian as a couple taking a sweet box as a gift to a Diwali party. Karanveer played the role of a Bellavita salesman, attempting to persuade them to choose a Bellavita perfume box instead of the sweet box. In Team B's performance, Alice and Eisha portrayed best friends who also planned to take a sweet box to the Diwali party, with Shehzada taking on the role of their salesman. Both teams' salesmen incorporated Bellavita's key attributes into their performances, highlighting points such as: "Bellavita perfumes are long-lasting because they contain oils imported from Europe," "Over the past two years, more than 5 crore bottles of Bellavita perfumes have been sold," and "With four distinct fragrances, Bellavita offers a unique alternative to traditional sweet gifts. That's why we say, 'Think Beyond Meetha, Gift Bellavita.'" The judges chose Team A and they received gift hampers filled with Bellavita perfumes. Since the housemates were together during this Diwali celebration, Bellavita also prepared gift hampers for their families outside. Team A was chosen, so hampers were awarded to Shrutika, Vivian and Karanveer.
Week 2	Sponsored	On Day 13, Harpic India introduced a task featuring a mood-o-meter currently present in the house, which rates the mood after using the bathroom. Whenever a guest arrives, they will provide their mood rating on the Harpic mood-o-meter. If the bathroom is not clean, they will give a sad rating, while a clean bathroom will receive a happy rating. Red Harpic Bathroom Cleaner specializes in everyday bathroom cleaning. All housemates must clean the bathrooms with Red Harpic Bathroom Cleaner to keep everyone's mood happy, as there will be surprises waiting during the weekend episodes. After this cleaning process, the mood-o-meter can be used, and if the bathrooms remain clean, the effects will be noticed during the weekend. All housemates then cleaned the bathrooms and basins with Red Harpic Bathroom Cleaner, eagerly awaiting the arrival of guests that weekend. During the Weekend Ka Vaar episodes, Krushna Abhishek inspected the bathrooms. He was pleased with the cleaning efforts and gave happy ratings on the Harpic mood-o-meter.
Week 2	Sponsored	On Day 14, Macho conducted a poll to choose the Macho Toing Man of the Week among the male housemates. The results were announced, and Vivian was selected as the Toing Man of the Week. He received a gift hamper from Macho as a reward.
Week 2	Sponsored	On Day 14, Blue Heaven gifted their range of cosmetic products to the female housemates for always being ready and presentable in the house.
Week 2	Exits	On Day 10, Gunratan walked out of the house due to his court case, becoming the first housemate to exit.
Week 2	Exits	On Day 14, Hema was evicted after facing the public vote, becoming the second housemate to exit.
Week 3	Twists	On Day 18, Bigg Boss called Avinash and presented him with two choices: to be released from jail and live as an ordinary housemate, or to remain in jail but gain additional powers, including control over the household's rations. Avinash opted for the second choice, deciding to stay in jail with enhanced authority. Subsequently, Bigg Boss announced to all the housemates that the jail had now transformed into a powerhouse due to its new privileges. To assist Avinash, another housemate would be chosen by the others and jailed. By majority vote, they chose Arfeen, who was promptly sent to join Avinash in jail. Shortly after this, Bigg Boss played an audio clip for all the housemates, revealing a past conversation in which Arfeen remarked that Sara did not deserve to be in the house. Bigg Boss emphasized that Arfeen, now holding power in jail, had significant influence over the dynamics within the house. As a consequence of his words, Sara was instructed to wear a "Expiring Soon" necklace that symbolized her impending eviction, which could happen within the next 24 hours. Later, Bigg Boss introduced a rankings task for the housemates, excluding those in jail, based on their contributions to the show. All housemates, except for Arfeen and Avinash, were required to rank themselves from 1 to 14, with 1 being the most valuable contributor and 14 the least. As the housemates struggled to reach a consensus on their rankings, Bigg Boss intervened by announcing that Arfeen and Avinash, would take over the responsibility of ranking their housemates. Arfeen and Avinash announced the rankings for all housemates, placing them from 1 to 14. The rankings were determined as follows: Rajat, Vivian, Shilpa, Sara, Eisha, Shrutika, Alice, Karanveer, Chaahat, Shahzada, Chum, Nyrraa, Tajinder, and Muskan. As Tajinder and Muskan were at the bottom of the rankings, Bigg Boss informed them that their contributions to the show had been lacking. With the message that "time doesn't wait for anyone," Tajinder and Muskan were given the Expiry Soon necklace, which they would wear alongside Sara. Additionally, they were warned that they were on a ticking time bomb; their time in the house was limited, and one of them would soon be evicted. Sara, Tajinder and Muskan were up for eviction as they had been given the Expiry Soon tag.
Week 3	Twists	On Day 20, housemates had to place a "Get Out" sticker on the face of Muskan, Sara, or Tajinder, all of whom were wearing the "Expiry Soon" tag. The housemates had to vote for whom they believed should leave the house. Muskan received the most votes, 6, and was subsequently evicted. Tajinder received 4 votes, while Sara garnered 3, indicating their unpopularity. Additionally, Bigg Boss announced that Arfeen and Avinash would be released from jail, with Sara and Tajinder taking their places, thus gaining control over the house's ration supplies. Furthermore, Bigg Boss confirmed that the previous nominations for public voting remain valid, meaning either Avinash, Rajat, Nyrraa, or Vivian will be evicted per public vote this weekend.
Week 3	Nominations	On Day 17, Bigg Boss asked all housemates to name their favorite member in the house. The majority chose Shrutika as their favorite. Following this, Bigg Boss gathered all housemates in the activity area, where a lamp and a chair were set up for the genie. Since Shrutika was voted as the favorite, she was given the power to control nominations instead of the Time God, who was not elected this week. Shrutika will distribute nomination rights to each housemate as follows: four housemates will receive no nomination rights, another four, 1 nomination right, four, 2 rights, and four, 3 nomination rights. Each housemate will be called individually by Bigg Boss to approach the lamp and rub it. After doing so, the genie, represented by Shrutika, will inform them of the number of nomination rights they have received. Once notified, each housemate will stand under the light corresponding to their nomination rights and proceed to nominate the number of housemates allowed by their rights.
Week 3	Nominations	Avinash, Nyrraa, Rajat, Muskan, Vivian were nominated for the third week's weekend eviction process.
Week 3	Time God Task	Bigg Boss General Elections On Day 16, Bigg Boss summoned Rajat in confession room and presented him with two choices: he could either secure the contendership for the Time God for himself or give it to another housemate. Rajat opted to claim the contendership for himself, becoming the first contender for the Time God title. Later, Bigg Boss announced a formal election between the current Time God, Arfeen and Rajat, who was vying to become the future Time God. The election setup, complete with campaigning, would take place in the garden area. Rajat, as Contestant 1, was assigned the symbol of the sun, while Arfeen, as Contestant 2, would represent the moon. In the first phase, both contestants needed to promote their candidacies to the other housemates, explaining why they should be chosen as the Time God. Afterward, one housemate would endorse their preferred contender and also share their reasons. At the sound of the buzzer, the second phase commenced. Each housemate then entered the confession room individually to cast their vote in a ballot box. Once the election process concluded, Bigg Boss announced that there was no definitive result, as both contenders received an equal number of votes—eight each. Consequently, there would be no Time God for the week.
Week 3	Time God	None
Week 3	Task	Welcome to Hell On Day 19, Bigg Boss offered all housemates a chance to earn rations for themselves. Hell was created in the garden area, overseen by its keepers, Arfeen and Avinash. Each housemate was required to sacrifice a personal belonging in the fire pit and, in exchange, they could request items from Arfeen and Avinash. The two would decide whether to grant any requests, and if so, to what extent; they also had the option to deny requests altogether. Housemates who chose not to sacrifice anything would not receive any rations. After the distribution, any remaining rations would be returned to the jail, under the control of Arfeen and Avinash. Those who received no items would be lined up against a wall. Once Arfeen or Avinash pressed a buzzer, a blast would ensue, dousing the housemate with black ink.
Week 3	Sponsored	On Day 16, Galaxy Jewels presented a key to Avinash, who was in jail and controlling the house's ration supply. This key unlocked a dispenser filled with chocolates from Galaxy Jewels. Avinash had the privilege of sharing these chocolates with up to three housemates whom he considered to have a special bond with. He chose to share the treats with Eisha, Alice, and Muskan.
Week 3	Sponsored	On Day 19, My Trident installed a small valve in the bedroom, showcasing their folklore bedsheets made from 100% cotton. One of the bedsheets, which featured the design of Kalpavriksha (the wishing tree), was elegantly laid on the My Trident bed.
Week 3	Sponsored	On Day 20, Macho announced the results of the "Toing Man of the Week" poll, which allowed viewers to vote for their favorite male housemate. Rajat was chosen as the winner and received a Macho Sporto gift hamper as a prize.
Week 3	Sponsored	On Day 21, host Salman Khan unveiled the Go Cheese Greet Corner, situated near the jail, where Go Cheese will deliver cheesy surprises throughout the season. This time, Go Cheese treated all the housemates to pizza.
Week 3	Exits	On Day 20, Muskan was evicted after the majority of housemates voted her out, becoming the third housemate to exit.
Week 3	Exits	On Day 21, Nyrraa was evicted after facing the public vote, becoming the fourth housemate to exit.
Week 4	Twists	On Day 26, Bigg Boss granted a special power to the Time God, Vivian. With Sara and Tajinder's term in jail coming to an end, it was Vivian's responsibility to send two new housemates in their place. He could take suggestions from the other housemates about whom to choose. Ultimately, Vivian decided to send Rajat and Shrutika to jail. Later, Bigg Boss announced that all the house rations would be stored in the kitchen instead of the jail, but this time, the ration would not be controlled by jailmates. Instead, the power to decide the menu for the kitchen would belong to the jailmates, as Bigg Boss provided them with a whiteboard and marker to vote on what dishes should be prepared.
Week 4	Nominations	On Day 24, housemates were required to nominate two fellow contestants in the confession room. However, those nominated would face a shock outside as a consequence. During the nomination process, Chum apologised to her housemates prior to entering the confession room to cast her votes. This resulted in Bigg Boss canceling her right to participate in the nominations.
Week 4	Nominations	Shehzada, Shrutika, Eisha, Avinash, Alice, Arfeen, Shilpa were nominated for the fourth week's weekend eviction process.
Week 4	Time God Task	Tandav Garh On Day 25, Bigg Boss presented a task to become Time God of the House. In this task, the house is transformed into Tandav Garh, ruled by Rajmata Shilpa. She has two princes, Vivian and Karanveer, who are rival brothers competing for her throne. The prince who becomes the successor gains the power to be the Time God. The task consists of two rounds. In the first round, both princes must present their case to Rajmata Shilpa, explaining why they deserve to succeed her and become the Time God. They will highlight their strengths while pointing out the weaknesses of their opponent. After their presentations, the people of Tandav Garh will have the opportunity to question both princes. In the second round, the princes must win the heart of Princess Chum. Upon completing this round, Princess Chum will recommend the prince who won her admiration to Rajmata Shilpa. Rajmata, considering the performances from both rounds, will decide which prince will be her successor and thus become the Time God of the house. Rajat will serve as the commander to Rajmata Shilpa during this task. After the conclusion of both rounds, Rajmata Shilpa chose Prince Vivian as the successor to her throne and announced him as the Time God of the house.
Week 4	Time God	Vivian
Week 4	Punishments	On Day 23, Bigg Boss reprimanded all housemates for their lack of organization and cleanliness in the house. He then turned to Vivian, who the housemates consider a favorite of Bigg Boss, and asked him who he thought was the most unorganized person in the house. Vivian named Chaahat, after which Bigg Boss asked the other housemates for their opinions; three of them agreed. In response, Bigg Boss announced that Chaahat would allocate duties for all housemates. She would oversee the distribution of duties, ensuring that everyone completed their assigned duties. Chaahat was provided with a duty board where she would write the names of housemates next to their respective duties. Until then, Rajat, who had previously served as the supervisor during the Time God's tenure, would train the housemates on how to properly execute their duties. Chaahat then allocated the following duties on the duty board: Duty Board: Breakfast Cleaning / Eisha; Alice / Lunch Cooking / Shilpa; Chum / Dining Area Cleaning / Avinash / Toilet Cleaning / Karanveer; Shrutika; Breakfast Chopping / Chaahat / Lunch Utensils Cleaning / Vivian; Arfeen / Living Area Cleaning / Shilpa / Wash-Basin Cleaning / Karanveer; Avinash; Breakfast Cooking / Chaahat; Alice / Dinner Cleaning / Alice / Garden Area Cleaning / Rajat / Bedroom Cleaning / Chaahat; Breakfast Utensils Cleaning / Shilpa / Dinner Chopping / Shehzada; Shrutika / Garden Pool Cleaning / Rajat / Balcony Area Cleaning / Chaahat; Lunch Cleaning / Eisha / Dinner Cooking / Shehzada; Shrutika / Bathroom Cleaning / Avinash; Eisha / The Office Cleaning / Shilpa; Lunch Chopping / Shilpa; Chum / Dinner Utensils Cleaning / Vivian; Arfeen / Luggage Area Organising & Cleaning / Shehzada; Rajat / Bedroom Bedsheet Making / Chaahat
Week 4	Sponsored	On Day 25, My Trident introduced a task where two teams would make a bed using My Trident bedsheets and rugs. Following this, each team would perform on a song. Team A consisted of Avinash and Eisha, while Team B included Karanveer and Chum. Shilpa and Vivian judged the performances, declared Team B the winners and awarded Karanveer and Chum a My Trident gift hamper.
Week 4	Sponsored	On Day 26, Harpic India organized a special activity in the house to celebrate Diwali. In this activity, Karanveer and Avinash were responsible for cleaning the bathrooms, wash basins with Red Harpic, and toilets with Blue Harpic. Once they completed the cleaning, Vivian would inspect their work and provide a rating on the mood-o-meter. Satisfied with the efforts of Karanveer and Avinash, Vivian gave a happy rating on the mood-o-meter.
Week 4	Sponsored	On Day 27, Galaxy Jewels presented a hamper of chocolates to Vivian, who was honored as the Time God during Diwali Week and became the Jewel of the House. Vivian had the option to share these chocolates with whomever he chooses.
Week 4	Exits	On Day 27, Shehzada was evicted after facing the public vote, becoming the fifth housemate to exit.
Week 5	Entrances	During Weekend Ka Vaar, host Salman Khan introduced new wildcard entrants to the audience. On Day 29, Digvijay and Kashish officially entered the house.
Week 5	Twists	On Day 29, Bigg Boss announced Rajat and Shrutika's release from jail and that the jail would be closed for a few days.
Week 5	Nominations	On Day 30, Bigg Boss summoned all housemates to the activity area, where a hungry octopus awaited them. The octopus would only be fed through the nominations of the housemates. Bigg Boss granted the nomination rights to the Time God Vivian, who was tasked with nominating eight housemates. Digvijay and Kashish were exempt from nominations, as it was their first week in the house. Vivian nominated Rajat, Chaahat, Shrutika, Sara, Karanveer, Arfeen, Tajinder, and Chum. Unexpectedly, Bigg Boss revealed that not all eight nominees were truly out of the running; four of them could still achieve safety. After announcing the nominated housemates by Bigg Boss, if at least four raise their hands to vote for a housemate's safety, then that nominated housemate would be safe. As he called out the names—Rajat, Chaahat, Karanveer, Shrutika, and Chum—Ultimately, Rajat, Karanveer, Shrutika, and Chum received enough votes to secure their safety. Consequently, Chaahat, Sara, Arfeen, and Tajinder remained nominated for elimination.
Week 5	Nominations	Chaahat, Sara, Arfeen, Tajinder were nominated for the fifth week's weekend eviction process.
Week 5	Time God Task	On Day 32, Bigg Boss assigned Team B a task to compete for the title of Time God, following their previous victory. In this challenge, Rajat, Chaahat, Shrutika, Digvijay, Karanveer, and Sara were required to hold the Time God's staff (scepter) using only one hand. Any contestant who lost their grip, changed hands, or relied on both hands would be eliminated. The last contestant remaining would be declared the new Time God, with Vivian moderating the task. As the task progressed, Shrutika, Chaahat, Rajat, and Sara were eliminated, leaving Digvijay and Karanveer as the final two contenders. During the intense challenge, the staff broke, with Digvijay holding one half and Karanveer holding the other. Given the task rules, Bigg Boss announced that since the staff was broken and neither contestant held it until the end, no one could be awarded the title of Time God. As a result, Vivian was reinstated as Time God and would continue his tenure.
Week 5	Time God	Vivian
Week 5	Tasks	Hammer Making Factory On Day 31, Bigg Boss announced the end of Vivian's tenure as Time God and introduced the selection process for the next Time God. This would involve a task between two teams, competing to create a soil hammer in the Hammer Making Factory, conducted in rounds. Each round would start with the factory siren. From each team, two members would try to make the hammer while the other two would protect it. At the end of each round, a moderator would declare the results, awarding the winning team a real hammer. This hammer would allow them to eliminate one member of the opposing team by breaking their pot. The team with the most members remaining at the end of the task would win, and all its members would then be eligible to become the next Time God. The teams were as follows: Team A: Vivian, Avinash, Eisha, Alice, Shilpa, and Chum; Team B: Rajat, Chaahat, Shrutika, Digvijay, Karanveer, and Sara Arfeen and Tajinder were excluded from the task due to violating house rules by sleeping, and Kashish would serve as the task moderator.: Round / Won / Eliminated; 1 / Team B / Avinash; 2 / Team B / Chum; 3 / Team B / Vivian; As Team B was leading the task with a score of 3-0, it became clear that Team A could no longer secure a win. Consequently, Bigg Boss announced the conclusion of the task, declaring Team B as the winner.
Week 5	Tasks	Winner – Team B: Rajat, Chaahat, Shrutika, Digvijay, Karanveer and Sara
Week 5	Tasks	Failed – Team A: Vivian, Avinash, Eisha, Alice, Shilpa and Chum
Week 5	Punishments	On Day 29, Bigg Boss reprimanded Sara for speaking English in the house and asked her what she would prefer as a consequence for not speaking Hindi. She humorously replied, "Tea". Bigg Boss responded by excluding tea powder from their next ration.; On Day 30, Bigg Boss reprimanded Kashish for speaking English in the house. He then asked her what she would prefer as a consequence for not using Hindi, to which she humorously replied, "Coffee". So Bigg Boss responded by excluding coffee powder from their next ration.
Week 5	Sponsored	On Day 29, Macho conducted a poll to choose the Macho Toing Man of the Week among the male housemates. The results were announced, and Vivian was selected as the Toing Man of the Week. He received a gift hamper from Macho as a reward.
Week 5	Sponsored	On Day 32, Go Cheese celebrated Team B's victory by sending a generous supply of cheese for the winning team members.
Week 5	Sponsored	On Day 34, Blue Heaven surprised the female housemates by gifting them a selection of their serum products.
Week 5	Sponsored	On Day 34, host Rohit Shetty introduced Ching's Chinese Sriracha Sauces to the housemates, highlighting them as some of the spiciest sauces in the world.
Week 5	Exits	On Day 34, Arfeen was evicted after facing the public vote, becoming the sixth housemate to exit.
Week 6	Twists	On Day 36, Bigg Boss introduced the option for the housemates to select their weekly ration. He noted that while he was willing to provide all the necessary items, previous violations of rules meant they could only choose 50 from the list. The housemates requested an increase in the number of items, and Bigg Boss agreed, stating he would provide more than 50 if they followed all rules. However, if they violated any rule, he would seize all rations. Some of the basic weekly ration lists are placed here.: Whole Wheat Flour / 1 packet is 1 kg (Max. 10 packets) / Cabbage / 1 tray is 1 kg (Max. 4 kg) / Masoor Dal / 1 packet is 250 gram (Max. 8 packets) / Tomato / 1 tray; Basmati Rice / 1 packet is 1 kg (Max. 10 packets) / Cauliflower / 1 tray is 1 kg (Max. 4 kg) / Yellow Moong Dal / 1 packet is 250 gram (Max. 8 packets) / Potato / 1 tray; Jowar Flour / 1 packet is 500 gram (Max. 3 packets) / Methi / 1 tray is 1 bundle (Max. 3 bundles) / Urad Dal / 1 packet is 250 gram (Max. 8 packets) / Lemon / 1 basket; Besan / 1 packet is 500 gram (Max. 3 packets) / Spinach / 1 tray is 1 bundle (Max. 3 bundles) / Split Green Moong Dal / 1 packet is 250 gram (Max. 8 packets) / Haldi; Poha / 1 packet is 500 gram (Max. 4 packets) / Carrot / 1 tray is 1 kg (Max. 3 kg) / Chana Dal / 1 packet is 250 gram (Max. 8 packets) / Mustard Seeds; Rava / 1 packet is 500 gram (Max. 4 packets) / Beetroot / 1 kg is 1 item (Max. 1.5 kg) / Chole / 1 packet is 250 gram (Max. 4 packets) / Oil; Toor Dal / 1 packet is 500 gram (Max. 8 packets) / Apple / 1 tray is 1 kg (Max. 30 kg) / Brown Chana / 1 packet is 250 gram (Max. 4 packets) / Ginger; Chicken / 1 packet is 900 gram (Max. 5 kg) / Watermelon / 1 tray is 3 kg (Max. 12 kg) / Whole Masoor / 1 packet is 250 gram (Max. 4 packets) / Red Chili Powder; Eggs / 1 tray is 1 dozen (Max. 12 dozens) / Grapes / 1 tray is 1 kg (Max. 8 kg) / Whole Green Moong / 1 packet is 250 gram (Max. 4 packets) / Green Chili; Cow's Milk / 1 packet is 1 liter (Max. 28 packets) / Orange / 1 tray is 1 kg (Max. 20 kg) / Whole Urad Dal (Kali Dal) / 1 packet is 250 gram (Max. 4 packets); Curd / 1 packet is 600 gram (Max. 14 packets) / Pear / 1 tray is 1 kg (Max. 14 kg) / Rajma / 1 packet is 250 gram (Max. 4 packets); Paneer / 1 tray is 1.5 kg (Max. 1.5 kg) / Pomegranate / 1 tray is 1 kg (Max. 25 kg); The housemates initially demanded 150 items, but when Bigg Boss agreed to their request, they declined and settled for just 50 items. Later, Bigg Boss presented three additional options that were missing from the original list: (1) Coffee or Vivian's Coffee, (2) Tea or Green Tea. To select any of these options, the housemates would have to sacrifice five of the items they had initially chosen. Ultimately, they decided against any of the additional options and stuck with the 50 items. Bigg Boss reprimanded them for choosing just 50 instead of taking the opportunity to request more, particularly since they had consistently failed to follow the rules. He emphasized that they should not voice concerns only regarding ration while ignoring their responsibility to adhere to the rules. In the end, Bigg Boss provided the housemates with their chosen 50 items as part of their weekly ration.
Week 6	Twists	On Day 41, Bigg Boss presented Time God Rajat with a unique opportunity to alter the timeline, allowing him to change nominations from the past. As the Time God, Rajat could save one housemate from nominations, excluding himself. In this process, he had to stick the photos of the housemates on a punching bag and punch the photos of those he wished to keep nominated. Ultimately, the last housemate remaining on the board would be saved from nomination. Rajat chose to save Digvijay from nominations, while all others remained on the list. Later, Bigg Boss disclosed that, based on the voting results up to that point, Digvijay was actually in the Top 2 and already in a safe zone.
Week 6	Nominations	BB Post Office On Day 37, the Bigg Boss house transformed into a village setup for the nomination process. The garden area featured two telephones—one for all the housemates, referred to as "villagers," and another at the BB Post Office, which was managed by Vivian, who served as the postman. When Bigg Boss called for nominations, each housemate approached the communal telephone to contact the post office. They informed Vivian of their two nomination choices. As a postman, Vivian meticulously recorded their nominations in letters. Once all the letters were written, Vivian had the power to cancel the nomination letters from any three housemates of his choice. After making his selections, he would then deliver the letters to the nominated housemates, who had been put forward for eviction this week. Vivian cancelled Karanveer, Rajat and Digvijay's nomination letters.
Week 6	Nominations	Tajinder, Shrutika, Rajat, Digvijay, Karanveer, Kashish, and Chum were nominated for the sixth week's weekend eviction process.
Week 6	Time God Task	Bagga Tea Corner On Day 39, Bigg Boss played a freeze-and-release game with the housemates. Afterward, the crew spread tea and coffee packets throughout the house. Bigg Boss then announced a special task to determine the 'Time God' among Shilpa, Rajat, and Chaahat. For this task, a shop named Bagga Tea Corner, owned by Tajinder, was set up in the house. However, thieves had turned over a truck carrying tea and coffee packets intended for Bagga Tea Corner. The contenders—Shilpa, Rajat, and Chaahat—would play the roles of these "thieves." With packets scattered across the floor, each contender had to collect the items and place them in their carts. Other housemates could support their favorites by transferring packets; however, only the contenders were allowed to pick them up from the floor. As a twist, since the tea and coffee were not provided by Bigg Boss due to rule violations, housemates had the chance to collect these packets for their rations. They could transfer packets from the contenders’ carts to Bagga Tea Corner, ensuring that only the packets in the shop remained in the house. Any packets collected in the contenders' carts would be returned to Bigg Boss. The contender with the highest number of collected packets would become 'Time God.' Eisha was the moderator for this task. After the completion of the task, Bigg Boss asked all the housemates whom they wanted to appoint as the new 'Time God.' He then asked Eisha to identify which of the three contestants had gathered the most packets. Eisha revealed that Rajat was carrying the most. So, Rajat was declared the new 'Time God.'
Week 6	Time God	Rajat
Week 6	Task	On Day 38, Bigg Boss instructed all housemates to form pairs, consisting of one boy and one girl, as only couples were allowed to attend the pajama party in the bedroom. Chaahat and Kashish were the only two girls left without partners. In response, Bigg Boss announced the establishment of two hostels in the garden—one for boys and one for girls—since the boys and girls were in love with one another. Chaahat and Kashish would serve as the wardens of these hostels. During the task, both wardens would eliminate one pair from entering the pajama party in each round. There would be five rounds, and the last remaining pair would become contenders for the title of Time God. The pairs participating were as follows: Avinash and Alice, Vivian and Eisha, Karanveer and Chum, Digvijay and Shrutika, Rajat and Shilpa, and Tajinder and Sara.: Round / Eliminated; 1 / Vivian and Eisha; 2 / Tajinder and Sara; 3 / Avinash and Alice; 4 / Digvijay and Shrutika; 5 / Karanveer and Chum; Ultimately, Rajat and Shilpa were the last pair standing, avoiding elimination. They became contenders for the title of Time God. Bigg Boss announced that since Chaahat and Kashish were not chosen by anyone as partners, they were appointed as wardens and thus missed the opportunity to claim contendership for the title of Time God. However, one of them could still compete for the title. The housemates who were not invited to the pajama party decided, through a mutual discussion, who among Chaahat and Kashish would become the third contender for Time God. After deliberation, the non-contender housemates chose Chaahat. Bigg Boss then revealed that Chaahat would join Shilpa and Rajat in a task to compete for the Time God.
Week 6	Task	Winner – Rajat and Shilpa
Week 6	Task	Failed – Avinash, Alice, Vivian, Eisha, Karanveer, Chum, Digvijay, Shrutika, Tajinder and Sara
Week 6	Sponsored	On Day 35, Macho gifted their Macho Sporto Range to Toing Man of the Week Karanveer, who was selected by audience poll for male housemates.
Week 6	Sponsored	On Day 40, Ching's Chinese introduced a cook-off challenge. In this competition, two teams were tasked with preparing dishes using Ching's Chinese Schezwan Chutney. Rajat, serving as the Time God, took on the role of judge and was responsible for allocating cuisines to both teams from the following options: East - Momos, West - Vada Pav, North - Paratha, and South - Uthapam. Rajat assigned the North cuisine, Paratha, to the team of Alice and Chaahat, while the East cuisine, Momos, was given to the team of Chum and Shilpa. After the cooking was completed, Rajat tasted each dish and made his decision regarding the winner. Ultimately, he declared the North team, consisting of Alice and Chaahat, as the winners. They received gift hampers from Ching's Chinese as a reward.
Week 6	Sponsored	On Day 41, Macho gifted their Macho Sporto Range to Toing Man of the Week Digvijay, who was selected by audience poll for male housemates.
Week 6	Sponsored	On Day 41, Blue Heaven introduced a task where two teams competed: one team consisting of Karanveer and Chum, and the other composed of Avinash and Eisha. In this challenge, the male member of each team was responsible for preparing the female member by applying a love duo lipstick and touching up her face. Once both female contestants were ready, the other female housemates voted to determine who looked better. The scores ended up tied, leading to both teams sharing the hamper provided by Blue Heaven.
Week 6	Exits	On Day 42, there was no eviction.
Week 7	Entrances	During Weekend Ka Vaar, host Salman Khan announced to the audience that three new wildcard contestants would enter the house this week. On Day 44, Aditi, Edin, and Yamini entered the house.
Week 7	Twists	On Day 45, Bigg Boss tasked the male housemates with selecting one of three new wildcard entrants to receive a special power and they chose Edin. Bigg Boss then revealed that Edin was granted the exclusive power to shop for the weekly rations for the house, where only she could see what items were available. Following this, Edin could choose items from the storeroom and pass them to other housemates mouth-to-mouth, with no one allowed to touch the items. After Edin selected an item, each housemate would pass it along until the last person in line dropped it into a designated box. If any item was accidentally dropped during the process, passing would restart from the beginning. The housemates were arranged in the following order: Edin, Karanveer, Shilpa, Chum, Shrutika, Kashish, Chaahat, Rajat, Digvijay, Avinash, Eisha, Vivian, Tajinder, Sara, Aditi, and Yamini. Alice served as the moderator and did not participate in the item passing. Ultimately, the housemates successfully collected milk, chicken, ghee, curd, urad dal, moong dal, rice, chhole, tur dal, rawa, aata, paneer, apples, poha, ginger, and potatoes.
Week 7	Twists	On Day 48, Bigg Boss called the Time God Digvijay into the confession room. He shared that he has always prioritized relationships in the show. Bigg Boss then offered him, as Time God, the chance to change the timeline and save Kashish from the eviction process. He declined, resulting in Kashish remaining nominated and then evicted.
Week 7	Nominations	On Day 44, Bigg Boss set up a lavish display of luxury food items on the dining table, featuring a throne at its center. Later, Bigg Boss announced that all the food items were exclusively for Time God Rajat. Each housemate, when called by Bigg Boss, would approach Rajat, who was seated on the throne. Based on their interaction, Rajat would choose how many food items to enjoy from each housemate, correlating that number to the nomination rights he wished to grant them. Rajat had the option to give a maximum of five nomination rights and a minimum of zero.
Week 7	Nominations	Karanveer, Avinash, Chaahat, Vivian, Digvijay, Kashish, and Alice were nominated for the seventh week's weekend eviction process.
Week 7	Time God Task	On Day 47, a nymph appeared above the house's swimming pool and communicated only through her messenger. The contenders for the title of Time God, along with Edin, would not compete to become the Time God. During the event, all non-contenders, except Edin, would race towards the swimming pool upon hearing a whispering sound. The first to cross the yellow line would become the messenger of the mysterious nymph. Once selected, the messenger would retrieve a cue card detailing a relationship within the house and read it aloud. The contenders would then engage in a debate based on the content of the card until the buzzer signaled the end of the discussion. Following the debate, the messenger would decide, based on which arguments' deceiptfulness and absurdity, whom to eliminate. Taking off a mic, the messenger would announce their choice and then push the eliminated contender into the swimming pool. Each housemate could serve as a messenger only once, while Edin would act as the moderator for the task.: Round / Messenger / Eliminated; 1 / Vivian / Karanveer; 2 / Chum / Eisha; 3 / Sara / Avinash; 4 / Rajat / Tajinder; Ultimately, Digvijay remained and became Time God.
Week 7	Time God	Digvijay
Week 7	Task	On Day 46, Bigg Boss announced the end of Rajat's tenure as Time God, introducing a new task to determine the next contenders for the title. A small jail was set up in the garden area of the house, where five male housemates would be "arrested" and handcuffed to each corner. Meanwhile, five female housemates—excluding the new wildcard entrants—would attempt to convince or torture the male housemates to quit the jail and take their place. Only two female housemates could enter the jail at a time to interact with two male housemates. The new wildcard entrants, Aditi, Edin, and Yamini, would serve as jailers, deciding which two female housemates to send in at any given moment for convincing or torturing. Notably, Rajat, the former Time God, would not participate in this task. During the task, Alice successfully replaced Vivian but was later swapped out for Eisha. By the end of the task, Karanveer, Avinash, Tajinder, Digvijay, and Eisha emerged as contenders for the next Time God.
Week 7	Task	Winner - Karanveer, Avinash, Tajinder, Digvijay and Eisha
Week 7	Task	Failed - Chaahat, Chum, Alice, Kashish, Shrutika, Shilpa, Sara and Vivian
Week 7	Sponsored	On Day 45, My Trident introduced a new bedsheet from their "Road to Jaipur" collection, named "Gulab Baugh." This design is inspired by the beauty of roses, is crafted from 100% cotton, and features a thread count of over 500, ensuring both comfort and durability.
Week 7	Sponsored	On Day 46, a key of Galaxy Flutes Chocolates distemper was provided to new wildcard entrants allowing them to indulge in a sweet treat.
Week 7	Sponsored	On Day 47, Go Cheese sent their slice products and other ingredients for making burgers to the newly elected Time God, Digvijay, to celebrate his victory. Digvijay was given chance to make a burger and share it with a housemate he feels particularly special about in the house. He shared it with Shrutika.
Week 7	Sponsored	On Day 48, Macho conducted a poll to choose the Macho Toing Man of the Week among the male housemates. The results were announced, and Vivian was selected as the Toing Man of the Week. He received a gift hamper from Macho as a reward.
Week 7	Sponsored	On Day 49, host Salman Khan introduced Bellavita's new line of moodtech perfumes and gifted them to the contestants.
Week 7	Exits	On Day 49, Alice was evicted after facing the public vote, becoming the seventh housemate to exit.
Week 8	Nominations	On Day 51, the "Room of Memories" was set up in the activity area, showcasing photos of cherished moments shared by all housemates except the three new wild card entrants. Bigg Boss then summoned Aditi, Edin, and Yamini into the room, explaining that the show revolves around the connections formed within the house. He noted that, thus far, the three of them had not established any connections. Bigg Boss gave them until the upcoming weekend to make these relationships, announcing that one of them would face eviction based on their lack of connections. Later, Bigg Boss revealed that the nomination process for the old housemates would happen in pairs, determined by their connections. Each pair would enter the Room of Memories, where they would sit on a scooter with a sidecar and discuss who would step down and be nominated, while the other would remain safe. If the pair could not reach a decision before the buzzer sounded, both would face nomination. The housemate opting for nomination would dismount the scooter and use an axe to break the photo behind them. As the Time God, Digvijay had the right to save any pair from the nomination process. Pairs were in following order: Rajat and Chaahat, Shrutika and Chum, Avinash and Eisha, Shilpa and Vivian, Karanveer and Tajinder, Sara and Kashish. Once the nominations were completed, Bigg Boss announced a double eviction for the upcoming weekend. One eviction would involve one of the three new wild card entrants, based on the votes of the housemates, while the second eviction would be among the old housemates who had been nominated, decided by audience votes.
Week 8	Nominations	Aditi, Edin and Yamini were nominated for the eighth week's weekend eviction process by votes of housemates while Shrutika, Avinash, Vivian, Karanveer, Tajinder, Kashish and Sara were nominated for the eighth week's weekend eviction process by audience votes.
Week 8	Time God Task	On Day 53, Edin, Eisha, and Vivian competed for the title of Time God. This week's tasks were centered on the theme of relationships within the house, beginning and ending with this focus. The task for time god would test the strength of the relationships among Eisha, Edin, and Vivian, as well as their ability to leverage those connections. Once the buzzer sounded, the three contenders would climb onto the shoulders of their partners. After the climb, they could not dismount—partners were required to carry the contenders around the house. They were not allowed to sit, use the bathroom, or lean against any walls to relieve the weight. The other housemates would play a significant role in this task, as well. Each contender would wear an earpiece linked to a radio station stationed in the dining area balcony. Once the task commenced, housemates could enter the radio station and use the microphone to annoy any contender they disliked with taunts or comments. These distractions aimed to stress the contenders, potentially causing them to jump down and forfeit the task. Any contender whose feet touched the ground would immediately be eliminated. Shilpa would serve as the moderator for this task. The pairs were as follows: Eisha with Avinash, Vivian with Rajat, and Edin with Karanveer.
Week 8	Time God	Eisha
Week 8	Tasks	On Day 52, Bigg Boss granted Time God Digvijay the power to select a contender who would not become the next Time God. Digvijay chose Avinash, who was then eliminated from the race. Following this, Bigg Boss announced that Digvijay's tenure as Time God had ended, signaling the need to select the next contenders, with former Time Gods Vivian, Rajat, and Digvijay playing crucial roles. A mischievous bear and its cubs were causing chaos in the garden area of the house. While the cubs were playful, the mother bear was a force to be reckoned with, brimming with energy and hunger for the housemates. Interestingly, her three favorites were the ex-Time Gods: Vivian, Rajat, and Digvijay. A cave setup represented the bear's den in the garden. As the task commenced, Vivian, Rajat, and Digvijay would take their places inside the cave. At intervals, the sound of rustling leaves signaled that one of the bear's cubs would slide down from one of the two slides. When this happened, all housemates except the ex-Time Gods would attempt to capture the cub. Whoever caught the teddy bear would be safe from the bear's wrath. Soon after, the sound of the bear's growl would echo, prompting one of the ex-Time Gods to exit the cave. Miniatures of all housemates were set up in the garden. The first ex-Time God to emerge from the cave could eliminate three housemates from the contention to become the Time God by breaking their miniatures with his feet. During the rounds, other housemates were allowed to enter the cave and suggest which housemates should be eliminated. At the conclusion of the task, three contenders would be up for becoming next Time God: two from the safe miniatures and third would be the ex-Time God who had exited the cave the most times to break miniatures. Avinash will serve as the moderator for this task.: Round / Safe / Ex-Time God / Eliminated; 1 / Tajinder / Digvijay / Kashish; Aditi; Yamini; 2 / Chaahat / Vivian / Shrutika; Karanveer; Chum; 3 / Edin / Rajat / Chaahat; Shilpa; Tajinder; 4 / Eisha / Vivian / Sara; At the end of task, Vivian, Eisha and Edin became contenders for becoming next Time God.
Week 8	Tasks	Winner - Vivian, Eisha and Edin
Week 8	Tasks	Failed - Digvijay, Rajat, Kashish, Aditi, Yamini, Shrutika, Karanveer, Chum, Chaahat, Shilpa, Tajinder and Sara
Week 8	Tasks	Kissa Kursi Ka On Day 54, the housemates participated in a ration task. At the sound of the buzzer, all housemates have to gather around the seating arrangement in the dining area. Once they were in place, the Bigg Boss anthem would be played. Following the anthem, the housemates will move around the chairs in a fashion similar to musical chairs. When the music stopped, everyone has to quickly sit down in the nearest chair. The first chair next to the storeroom was significant: whoever sat in that chair would have the first choice of the ration baskets placed in front of them. After the music stopped, the person sitting on that chair would get up, select a basket, and then pass it along until it reached the last person in line. The last person would place the basket in the kitchen area; this ration would be for the entire house and under control of the Time God Eisha. If at any point someone holding a basket decided they did not want to pass it and preferred to keep it for themselves, they could choose to do so. In that case, the basket's contents remained under their control. Eisha will be the moderator for the task. In the end, none of the baskets reached the kitchen area; instead, all the ration baskets remained under the control of various housemates.
Week 8	Tasks	On Day 55, the Room of Memories returned to the house. Last time, Bigg Boss had set an expiry date for Aditi, Edin, and Yamini, and that date had now arrived. Bigg Boss called Aditi, Edin, and Yamini to the activity area, where the Room of Memories was set up. The connections made by these three housemates would be tested, with the ultimate results in the hands of all the housemates. In the activity area, photos of each housemate with Aditi, Edin, and Yamini were displayed. Each housemate had to enter the activity area and indicate which had best built connections. After selecting a name, they were required to attach their photo with that housemate to a designated wall. At the conclusion of this activity, the housemate among Aditi, Edin, and Yamini with the fewest photos on the wall would be evicted from the house. Edin received eleven photos, Yamini received three photos, while Aditi received none. As Aditi received no photos, she was evicted from the house.
Week 8	Sponsored	On Day 53, Vaseline introduced an opportunity called "Live Your Bollywood Moment" for all housemates. The garden area was transformed into a snowy wonderland. To celebrate the season Bollywood-style, the challenge focused on three elements: immense confidence, flawless skin, and, of course, Vaseline. The task was divided into three teams: Team A included Chaahat and Rajat, Team B featured Karanveer and Edin, and Team C comprised Shilpa and Vivian. Each heroine had to moisturize her skin using Vaseline Deep Moisture and perform with their partner a dance to an iconic winter-themed Bollywood song. After all the performances, moderator Eisha would announce the winning team based on outstanding execution and creativity. Team A, consisting of Rajat and Chaahat, was declared the winner and was rewarded with an exclusive gift hamper from Vaseline.
Week 8	Sponsored	On Day 55, Good Knight introduced an engaging activity in the house featuring their latest product: the Good Knight Flash. This new vaporizer is two times stronger and faster than any other liquid vaporizers, effectively repelling mosquitoes for an extended period, ensuring families enjoy a restful night's sleep. Remarkably, the Good Knight Flash remains effective for up to two hours after being switched off. In the garden area, a display board showcased photos of all the housemates. One by one, the ex-time gods—Vivian, Rajat, Digvijay, and current time god—Eisha—plugged in the new Good Knight Flash and attached a photo of a housemate they felt was like a "mosquito"—someone who irritates them and sucks their blood. During this activity, Vivian chose Chaahat, Rajat selected Karanveer, Digvijay chose Shrutika and Eisha picked Digvijay.
Week 8	Sponsored	On Day 56, Go Cheese delighted all the former female housemates by providing them with gourmet pizzas as a token of appreciation.
Week 8	Exits	On Day 55, Aditi was evicted after the majority of housemates voted her out, becoming the eighth housemate to exit.
Week 9	Twists	On Day 63, host Farah Khan announced that this week's eviction process would not involve the audience; instead, the housemates would vote to decide who to evict. She asked each housemate to nominate one person for eviction. Kashish received 6 votes, Chum received 5 votes, Sara received 2 votes, Karanveer received 1 vote, and Digvijay received 1 vote. Later, Farah revealed that there would be no eviction this week.
Week 9	Nominations	On Day 58, Bigg Boss summoned all housemates to the activity area for nominations. There was a demonic power's pet to make the housemates fear being nominated. Any housemate pricked by the creature's thorn would find themselves nominated. However, Eisha, the house's time god, was able to counteract this. One by one, the housemates sat before Eisha. Bigg Boss then prompted the other housemates to express their desire to nominate the seated housemate. If at least three voiced their reasons for nomination, that individual would be officially nominated. If Eisha chose to save the nominated housemate, she would present a vial of antidote, providing a chance to escape the poison of nominations. However, Eisha had only three vials at her disposal, meaning she could save only three housemates from the impending danger.
Week 9	Nominations	Shilpa, Sara, Chum, Kashish, Digvijay, and Karanveer were nominated for the ninth week's weekend eviction process.
Week 9	Time God Task	On Day 59, Bigg Boss announced the end of Eisha's tenure as the Time God. He then called all housemates to the garden area, where a gaming zone had been set up. The housemates had embarked on a journey together, where starting is easy, but completing the journey is much more challenging. Along the way, they encounter difficulties, challenges, and obstacles. A journey requires hard work, dedication, resilience against opponents, and sometimes, just a stroke of luck. The upcoming game will test all these qualities, and the housemate who excels will become the next Time God. The task will proceed as follows: 1. Luck: A spinning wheel is placed near the swimming pool, featuring the names of all housemates. Eisha will spin the wheel, and when it stops, the name next to the arrow will get a chance to compete for the title of Time God.; 2. Hard Work: Dominos are set up in the garden area. Once the buzzer sounds, the housemate selected by the spinning wheel will have 30 minutes to create a wall of dominos from the starting point to the finish point.; 3. Challenges: While one housemate is building the wall, other housemates who do not want them to become Time God can sabotage the effort by knocking over the dominos. If the builder fails to complete the wall within the time limit, they will lose their chance to become Time God.; Eisha's name will not be on the spinning wheel, as she will serve as the moderator for this task. After Avinash, Vivian, Kashish, Karanveer, and Chaahat failed to build a wall of dominoes, Bigg Boss announced that the housemates' lack of effort would prevent the house from receiving its time god. However, Bigg Boss clarified that the task would not be canceled, and a time god would still be appointed. He reminded everyone that the task relied significantly on luck. Eisha would spin the wheel, and the names of the two housemates who landed on the arrow would become contenders for the time god. Those not chosen would miss this opportunity. The task involved two colors of bricks: gold and silver. Each contender would select one color, and upon the sound of the buzzer, they would start building their domino wall. Other housemates could assist their chosen contender but were not allowed to interfere with the opponent. Only the contenders could dismantle each other's walls. If neither contender finished their wall by the next buzzer, the one who built the most wall segments would become the next time god of the house. Following Bigg Boss's command, Eisha spun the wheel, resulting in Rajat being selected as the first contender and Digvijay as the second. Digvijay chose gold while Rajat opted for silver. As the moderator of the task, Eisha disqualified Digvijay and declared Rajat the winner. Consequently, Rajat became the time god.
Week 9	Time God	Rajat
Week 9	Task	On Day 61, the Bigg Boss house transformed into BB Retreat, where a special guest would soon arrive. This guest was known for her grand hobbies and a distinct personality that follows her own rules. If things didn't align with her preferences, she could become quite angry, and it would be the housemates' responsibility to ensure she remained happy. Rajat, the designated manager of the BB Retreat, was asked by Bigg Boss to choose two assistant managers. He selected Avinash and Shrutika for the role, while the remaining housemates became the staff of BB Retreat. During the guest's stay, the housemates were tasked with keeping her satisfied. Bigg Boss issued a warning to all housemates: the level of dedication they showed in fulfilling their responsibilities would directly impact their rations for the following week. The happier they kept the guest, the more fulfilled their own needs would be. Essentially, the housemates needed to prepare for an evening of hospitality, ensuring that their guest felt comfortable and content. Later, Bigg Boss welcomed the high-profile guest, Shalini Passi, an art and design collector, UNICEF champion for children member, and philanthropist, to BB Retreat. On Day 62, Bigg Boss announced that Shalini's time to say goodbye to BB Retreat had come. Before her departure, Bigg Boss asked Shalini whether she was satisfied with the service provided by the housemates. Shalini responded with a resounding yes, as the housemates kept her happy. As a result, all the rations kept on the rack were made available to the housemates. As tokens of appreciation, Shalini presented a gift to each housemate.
Week 9	Punishments	On Day 63, host Farah Khan issued a stern warning to all housemates that any act of physical aggression would result in immediate eviction from the house. This warning followed a physical incident that had occurred during the week.
Week 9	Sponsored	On Day 60, Parle-G, a trusted brand, introduced its latest product, Chakki Atta, which is whole wheat flour made using the traditional chakki method to retain nutritional fibers. Parle-G has organized a task for the boys in the house. In this task, the boys will create heart-shaped parathas using Parle-G Atta and present them to any girl of their choice, explaining their reason for the gift. The task moderator, Yamini, will reward the boy whose heart-shaped paratha and reason resonate with her the most with a hamper from Parle-G. Yamini chose Digvijay as winner and rewarded him with a hamper by Parle-G.
Week 9	Exits	On Day 63, there was no eviction.
Week 10	Nominations	On Day 65, Bigg Boss emphasized the importance of opinions in the house. Each housemate had reached this stage because of their perspectives on the house dynamics, relationships, and fellow contestants. The nomination process would be based on these opinions. During this twist, the housemates found themselves on a jungle safari, with Rajat acting as their guide. However, Rajat manipulated the situation to his advantage, trapping the others while locking himself in a secure hut to protect himself from a "hungry, dangerous lion." Interestingly, Rajat didn't just lock himself in; he also confined one of his favorite housemates in the hut, though his favorite constantly changed. Before each round, Rajat would summon a housemate to his hut. The chosen housemate would be exempt from nominations for that round. However, Rajat could only select a housemate a maximum of three times.
Week 10	Nominations	Digvijay, Karanveer, Chaahat, Tajinder, Edin and Vivian were nominated for the tenth week's weekend eviction process.
Week 10	Time God Task	On Day 67, yesterday's story revolved around the narrative of equations, particularly the journey of contenders challenging time. From the previous task, the house generated four contenders for Time God: Rajat, Chum, Shrutika, and Avinash. In today's task, this story continues and a new Time God will be chosen. In the dining area, a framework of three circles was set up. When the buzzer sounded, the four contenders stood on the outer circle and began to circulate while carrying a bowl filled with colored water. Each bowl bore two markings: a black marking and a red one. At the start of the task, the contenders chose their favorite color of water to fill their bowls up to the black marking before they began their rounds. The rules mandated that while the contenders could walk at their own pace, they could not stop moving. If the water in any contender's bowl dipped below the red marking or if they dropped their bowl, that contender would be eliminated from the race for the Time God title. Ultimately, the last contender remaining with water in their bowl would be declared the new Time God. Kashish moderated the first round. Shrutika was ruled out first for stepping beyond the circle. In the second round, Shrutika was the moderator and Rajat was eliminated as he dropped his bowl. Rajat moderated the third round and Chum was eliminated. Only Avinash remained with water in his bowl, and became the new Time God.
Week 10	Time God	Avinash
Week 10	Tasks	On Day 66, Bigg Boss announced the conclusion of Rajat's tenure as the Time God. He explained that a contender qualifies through passion, skill, and capability. Among all housemates, the three who accumulate the highest Bigg Boss currency will become contenders for the Time God title. In this task, Karanveer, Digvijay, and Avinash will act as taxi drivers, while Yamini and Chaahat will serve as traffic officers. The remaining housemates will play the role of passengers. As the task begins, all passengers will be locked in their positions, while the three taxi drivers will navigate the house in their taxis seeking the next fare. Roads will be designated within the house, and taxi drivers must stay on these routes. Passengers cannot move independently; they must use taxis to travel from one location to another. When the signal turns green, accompanied by the sound of a starting vehicle, passengers will indicate where they want to go. Taxi drivers can set their fares in BB currency according to their discretion. When the signal turns red, marked by the sound of brakes, the taxis must stop. Each passenger will start with 7,000 BB currency. Both passengers and taxi drivers must strive to maintain maximum BB currency, as the passenger with the highest currency will become the first contender, while the taxi driver with the most earnings will secure the second spot. If any taxi driver or passenger violates the rules, traffic officers can impose fines. At the end of the task, the traffic officer with the highest BB currency will be named the third contender for the Time God. During the task, traffic officers Chaahat and Yamini overlooked violations committed by taxi drivers and passengers. As a result, Bigg Boss revoked their opportunity to contend for the Time God while they remained in their roles until the task's completion. At the end of the task, Bigg Boss announced that there would be three contenders for the Time God, having eliminated the traffic officers from contention. The top two passengers with the most BB currency would now become the contenders. Bigg Boss asked everyone to reveal their BB currency. Among the taxi drivers, Digvijay had 1,000, Karanveer had 7,200, and Avinash had 25,300. As Avinash had the highest BB currency, he became the first contender for Time God. Among the passengers, Shrutika and Chum had 7,000 each, while Rajat had 22,500. The remaining passengers—Edin, Tajinder, Vivian, Shilpa, Eisha, Sara, and Kashish—had 0 BB currency. Consequently, Rajat, Chum, and Shrutika became the next contenders for Time God. Thus, Avinash, Rajat, Chum, and Shrutika were announced as the final contenders for Time God.
Week 10	Tasks	Winner - Avinash, Rajat, Chum and Shrutika
Week 10	Tasks	Failed - Karanveer, Digvijay, Yamini, Chaahat, Edin, Tajinder, Vivian, Shilpa, Eisha, Sara and Kashish
Week 10	Tasks	On Day 68, Bigg Boss informed all housemates that during this Weekend Ka Vaar, one of the six nominated contestants—Edin, Tajinder, Chaahat, Karanveer, Digvijay, and Vivian—would sit on the sofa for the last time. However, in a generous mood, Bigg Boss announced that all six nominated housemates would have a chance to exempt themselves from the danger of elimination. Today, the house will occasionally echo with yawns. During these moments, the bedroom lights will dim. When this happens, the nominated contestants can approach any housemate they want, engaging in conversation to win them over. In the center of the bedroom, there are photos of all the nominated housemates. When the sound of chirping birds is heard, six housemates from the safe group will pick up a photo of one of the nominated contestants. The safe housemate who picks up the photo and reaches Avinash last will see their nominated contestant's photo thrown into the pool. This act signifies that the chance for that nominated housemate to escape the nominations will sink just like the photo. At the end of the task, the nominated contestant whose photo remains unthrown will be safe from this week's nominations. At the end of Round 1, Kashish reached last while holding Chaahat's photo, resulting in Chaahat remaining nominated. In Round 2, Eisha reached last with Vivian's photo, and thus, Vivian remained nominated. During Round 3, Eisha again reached last while carrying Digvijay's photo, leaving Digvijay nominated as well. In Round 4, Rajat reached last while holding Edin's photo, which meant Edin also stayed nominated. Finally, in the last round, Shrutika reached last with Tajinder's photo, leaving Tajinder nominated too. As Karanveer's photo was the only one not thrown into the pool, he was saved from nomination.
Week 10	Tasks	Sachchai ka Ration On Day 69, Bigg Boss will challenge the housemates to confront the truth and demonstrate the courage to embrace it. The amount of truth revealed will determine the weekly ration allocated to them. Each season of Bigg Boss has its own distinct flavor—love, friendship, rivalry, and passion. This season stands out because it encompasses them all: friendship, love, enmity, conflict, alliances, and differing opinions. However, what truly matters to the housemates is their ration and the numbers game involved. Until now, the housemates have hidden their true feelings behind the facade of rationing. Bigg Boss will present truths to the housemates disguised as ration discussions. The quantity of truth revealed will directly influence how much ration they receive. During this task, the social media audience's opinions about housemates will be introduced. One by one, housemates will enter the activity area to hear the opinions directed at them. Each time a majority of housemates agree with the audience's opinion, they will earn one item of ration. Conversely, if the majority disagrees, they will not receive anything.
Week 10	Sponsored	On Day 67, Go Cheese launched a social media contest in the outside world. In the contest, viewers deemed Rajat the Bigg Boss housemate most "extra cheesy and amazing," just like Go Cheese. So he received cheese momos made with Go Cheese and also Go Cheese and Govardhan ghee for an entire year.
Week 10	Sponsored	On Day 70, Bellavita presented a set of their Mood Tech perfumes to Avinash for becoming the Time God. They mentioned that he could gift it to someone whose mood he wished to change. Avinash decided to give the set to Vivian.
Week 10	Exits	On Day 70, Tajinder was evicted after facing the public vote, becoming the ninth housemate to exit.
Week 11	Twists	On Day 76, the game of time revealed that the past, present, and future are constantly in flux, and it is our decisions that remain steadfast. However, Shrutika's choices have often changed like dry leaves swaying in the wind. She was tasked with ranking all housemates based on their contributions to the show. The housemate she deemed to have contributed the most would receive a number 1 leaf around their neck, while the one she felt had contributed the least would wear the number 13 leaf. Shrutika ranked the housemates from 1 to 13 in the following manner: Rank / Housemate; 1 / Rajat; 2 / Avinash; 3 / Chum; 4 / Karanveer; 5 / Sara; 6 / Shilpa; 7 / Vivian; 8 / Chaahat; 9 / Kashish; 10 / Eisha; 11 / Digvijay; 12 / Edin; 13 / Yamini; Bigg Boss announced the conclusion of Shrutika's ranking process, referencing Newton's basic law: every action has an equal and opposite reaction. In this case, the action was the rankings, and the reaction would be eviction from the house. He further instructed that until his next announcement, all housemates would be required to wear their assigned ranking leaves. Bigg Boss called all the housemates into the activity area to address the consequences of Shrutika's recent actions. The bottom six in the rankings were particularly affected, facing the repercussions of her choices. Many housemates mentioned the "main door of the house" in past. The Time God of the house seemed to believe that the bottom six were not contributing adequately, hinting at their potential exit from the main door in the future. When Bigg Boss asked Shrutika if she wanted to alter the rankings, she declined, leaving Chaahat, Kashish, Eisha, Digvijay, Edin, and Yamini vulnerable for eviction. In ancient times, some intellectuals foretold the future by writing on banyan leaves; a similar method would be applied in the eviction process. All housemates would take a leaf from the banyan tree and use a marker to write the name of one housemate from the bottom six whom they believed contributed the least to the show. The housemate with the most leaves attached at the end of this process would face eviction in a dramatic "Tandav of Time." Though most housemates voted for Digvijay's eviction, Bigg Boss made an unprecedented announcement: had Digvijay not been in the bottom six, based on votes, he would have ranked in the top five. But due to the majority's votes against him, Digvijay was evicted. Later, Bigg Boss revealed that all housemates, except Shrutika, remained nominated for eviction.
Week 11	Nominations	On Day 72, Bigg Boss initiated the nomination process by asking Time God Avinash to choose one male housemate among the four in the house to cancel their nomination rights. Avinash selected Digvijay, allowing the other three male housemates to proceed with their nominations. Later, Bigg Boss opened Avinash's café in the activity area, where café owner Avinash met with each of the nine female housemates individually. Each female housemate shared two names of those they wished to nominate. Avinash had the power to cancel the nomination rights of two female housemates. Meanwhile, the female housemates who received nomination rights were given two cups of coffee to distribute to the individuals they nominated.
Week 11	Nominations	Yamini, Rajat, Karanveer, Shilpa, Chaahat, Digvijay, Chum and Shrutika were nominated for the eleventh week's weekend eviction process.
Week 11	Nominations	On Day 75, Bigg Boss announced that nominations would take place like those of the Time God, Shrutika. In the house, new nominations would be introduced, along with a weekly ration that Shrutika would shop for. During this shopping process, Shrutika would buy ration from her housemates. Bigg Boss would pair one nominated housemate with one safe housemate. One by one, these pairs would be called to the garden area, where each housemate would choose a basket of rations from the selection available. They would then attempt to sell their basket to Shrutika. If Shrutika chose the basket from the nominated housemate, that housemate would remain nominated for that round. However, if she selected the basket from the safe housemate, that safe housemate would have the opportunity to save one nominated housemate and replace them with any safe housemate of their choice. To keep everyone informed about the nominations and avoid confusion, a magnetic board was placed in the garden area to display the pictures of nominated and safe housemates. After each round, Shrutika would update the board accordingly. There would be a total of seven rounds. At the end of these rounds, all housemates' pictures under the "nominated" section on the board would represent the new nominations, and those individuals would face the eviction process.: Round / Nominated Housemated / Safe Housemate / Chosen / Swapped from / Swapped to; 1 / Shilpa / Vivian / Vivian / Yamini / Sara; 2 / Rajat / Eisha / Eisha / Rajat / Kashish; 3 / Karanveer / Kashish / Kashish / Sara / Eisha; 4 / Yamini / Edin / Edin / Kashish / Avinash; 5 / Chaahat / Sara / Sara / Chum / Vivian; 6 / Chum / Avinash / Chum / No; 7 / Digvijay / Kashish / Kashish / Shrutika / Rajat; During the last round, Digvijay found himself as the only original nominated housemate left without a pair, since all the original safe housemates were already paired up. Consequently, Bigg Boss instructed the original safe housemates to choose one among them to pair with Digvijay, and they selected Kashish. Rajat, Chaahat, Vivian, Eisha, Shilpa, Karanveer, Avinash and Digvijay were new nominated housemates. After completion of task, Time God Shrutika approached Bigg Boss, requesting additional rations, as she felt there were not enough in the house. Bigg Boss reprimanded her, pointing out that instead of negotiating and securing proper rations for the house, she had been focused on altering nominations. He noted that she was openly encouraging the safe housemates to come and change their nominations before making their ration selections. In response to the situation—given that the process intertwined nominations with ration distribution—Bigg Boss decided to redistribute all the available rations among the housemates while nominating every housemate except Time God Shrutika.
Week 11	Nominations	Avinash, Chum, Chaahat, Digvijay, Edin, Eisha, Karanveer, Kashish, Rajat, Sara, Shilpa, Vivian and Yamini were nominated for the eleventh week's weekend eviction process.
Week 11	Time God Task	On Day 74, Bigg Boss announced a task that would test the housemates' patience and haste. In the garden area, there was a fruit storeroom filled with artificial fruits, overseen by the security guard Rajat, who has a fondness for fruit. To tempt him away, genuine fruit was placed for Rajat to enjoy. While he may not be a contender for the title of "Time God," his decisions would determine who would become the next Time God. Rajat, basing his choices on his own equations, would signal housemates when it was time to steal from the storeroom. The call "Rajat jaao, fal khaao" would signify that Rajat could start eating, allowing two non-contenders—Chaahat, Kashish, Yamini, Edin, Sara, and Avinash—to sneak in and gather as many fruits as they could. During this time, they needed to fill the basket of their favored contender with the stolen fruits. Rajat would have a basket filled with fruit too, but he could only eat three at a time, and the speed at which he ate would depend on his equations. Once the stealing phase concluded, it would be up to the contenders to protect their fruits from the other contenders. At the end of the task, the contender with the most fruits in their basket would be declared the next Time God. Rajat would serve as the moderator alongside the guard. At the end of the task, Shrutika's basket contained the most fruits among all the contenders, which resulted in her being declared the next Time God.
Week 11	Time God	Shrutika
Week 11	Tasks	On Day 73, Bigg Boss announced the conclusion of Avinash's tenure as Time God. He expressed his gratitude to a sister-brother duo who had introduced him to two important words: "clarity" and "samikaran." He elaborated on the meanings of these words, stating that they would serve as the foundation for selecting the next Time God. He proposed a task involving colors—an idea that could not be executed without mentioning Avinash. Known for his playful antics, Avinash had a keen interest in self-portraits. Both groups were tasked with creating a painting of him, and whichever artwork he favored would lead its members to become contenders for the Time God title. Two painting setups were arranged in the garden area, with seating for Avinash on a platform above the swimming pool. At the end of the task, Avinash would sign the painting he liked best, declaring that group the contenders for Time God. Bigg Boss announced the teams as follows: Team 1: Karanveer, Vivian, Eisha, Shilpa, Chum, Shrutika, and Digvijay Team 2: Rajat, Sara, Edin, Yamini, Kashish, and Chaahat Avinash was designated as the moderator, and the task would commence after a buzzer signal. During the task, several housemates violated the rules by throwing water and damaging the microphones they were wearing, prompting Bigg Boss to halt the activity. He then instructed Avinash to promptly select a painting he liked. Ultimately, Avinash chose the painting created by Team 1 and signed on it, signaling their victory and marking them as the new contenders for Time God. After Avinash selected the painting from Team 1, Karanveer, Vivian, Eisha, Shilpa, Chum, Shrutika, and Digvijay were officially declared the contenders for the next Time God.
Week 11	Tasks	Winner - Team 1 - Karanveer, Vivian, Eisha, Shilpa, Chum, Shrutika and Digvijay
Week 11	Tasks	Failed - Team 2 - Rajat, Sara, Edin, Yamini, Kashish and Chaahat
Week 11	Sponsored	On Day 73, Harpic Disinfectant Bathroom Cleaner presented the Bigg Bathroom Roast, an entertaining event featuring stand-up comedian Gaurav Kapoor. During the roast, Gaurav humorously poked fun at the housemates while simultaneously promoting Harpic Disinfectant Bathroom Cleaner.
Week 11	Sponsored	On Day 77, Christmas arrived early for the housemates as Bellavita brought special Christmas gifts. Bellavita gift sets are popular for Secret Santa gifts for friends, family, and colleagues. In the house, the beloved "ex-time gods"—Vivian, Rajat, Eisha, and Avinash—will take on the role of Secret Santa. Each will select a Bellavita perfume that best suits a fellow housemate's personality and write a personalized note to accompany it. After receiving their gifts, each housemate will read the note aloud, trying to guess which Secret Santa gifted them. Once a housemate successfully identifies their Secret Santa, they will join them for a dance to a song played by the jukebox. Finally, all the ex-time gods will open a special gift hamper from Bellavita, revealing unique gifts for each housemate.: Secret Santa / Gifted to / Perfume; Eisha / Edin / Glam; Vivian / Chum / Blush; Rajat / Shilpa / Devil; Avinash / Karanveer / Fantasy
Week 11	Sponsored	On Day 77, Go Cheese treated all housemates with cheese balls to mark advance celebrations of Christmas in house.
Week 11	Exits	On Day 76, Digvijay was evicted after the majority of housemates voted him out, becoming the tenth housemate to exit.
Week 11	Exits	On Day 77, Edin and Yamini were evicted after facing the public vote, becoming the eleventh and twelfth housemates respectively to exit.
Week 12	Twists	On Day 82, Bigg Boss asked all housemates to vote for whom they wanted to give the "Get Out" tag based on their filled "pot of sins." Sara received 7 votes, while Rajat, Shrutika, and Karanveer each received 1 vote. In the end, Bigg Boss granted the Time God Chum the power to save one nominated housemate—Chaahat, Rajat, Kashish, Avinash, Eisha, Sara, or Vivian—from nominations. Chum chose to save Chaahat. As a result, Rajat, Kashish, Avinash, Eisha, Sara, and Vivian remained nominated.
Week 12	Nominations	On Day 79 at 5:15 PM, Bigg Boss announced that, in celebration of Christmas and the nomination day, two types of individuals had arrived in the colony: gift-givers and gift-breakers. Bigg Boss called all the housemates to the activity area, where each housemate's abode was displayed, with one housemate sitting by each window. Shrutika was tasked with placing a specific number of gifts outside each window based on her discretion. She could place a maximum of five gifts and a minimum of one gift at each window. The number of gifts a housemate received would affect their nominations positively. Shrutika decided to distribute the gifts as follows: 5 gifts to Chum and Karanveer, 4 gifts to Shilpa and Chaahat, 3 gifts to Kashish and Rajat, 2 gifts to Vivian and Sara, 1 gift to Avinash and Eisha.; After the gift distribution, Bigg Boss announced that the number of gifts each housemate received would represent their "lives" for the nomination process. One by one, housemates would stand before their windows wearing coats and use axes to break the gifts of two nominated housemates. At the end of this activity, any housemate with no gifts left would be nominated. The nominations unfolded as follows: Avinash nominated Sara and Kashish, Karanveer nominated Sara and Eisha, Eisha nominated Chaahat and Kashish, Rajat nominated Chaahat and Vivian, Vivian nominated Chaahat and Kashish, Shilpa nominated Avinash and Rajat, Chum nominated Vivian and Rajat, Kashish nominated Chaahat and Shilpa, Chaahat nominated Rajat and Chum, Sara nominated Shilpa and Karanveer.; As a result of the gifts being completely broken at the windows, the housemates nominated were Sara, Eisha, Kashish, Avinash, Vivian, Rajat, and Chaahat.
Week 12	Nominations	Sara, Eisha, Kashish, Avinash, Vivian, Rajat and Chaahat were nominated for the twelfth week's weekend eviction process.
Week 12	Time God Task	On Day 82, Bigg Boss addressed the housemates, reminding them that they had all come to win this competition and were on their unique journeys. However, the path they tread is challenging, and many may falter along the way; not everyone reaches their destination. In the snowy valley, Bigg Boss has created a special path—the same one that leads to the coveted title of Time God. This path has become desolate due to Chum's past mistakes, but the housemate who conquers this path will earn a spot in the 14th week. Today, the housemates will engage in skiing on the course set in the garden area. Skis have been placed on a designated track, and each housemate will pair up, donning shoes attached to the skis. They must navigate the course until further instructions from Bigg Boss. If any housemate removes their foot from the shoe or if any part of their body touches the ground, they will be eliminated from the task. Additionally, the skis must always remain on the designated track. If one partner falls out, the remaining partner can continue on the ski alone. Ultimately, the last housemate standing will be declared the Time God. Shrutika will serve as the moderator for this task, and she will make the final decision on any eliminations. The pairs participating were Vivian and Chaahat, Shilpa and Kashish, Eisha and Sara, Karanveer and Rajat, and Avinash and Chum. At the end of the task, when asked by Bigg Boss, Shrutika announced that Chum was the last one standing on the skis. Consequently, Chum was crowned the Time God.
Week 12	Time God	Chum
Week 12	Tasks	On Day 80 at 5:15 PM, Bigg Boss announced the dismissal of Shrutika as Time God. He then assigned a task to the housemates to compete for the contendership of Time God. Snow began falling in the garden area, and all housemates were required to build snowmen from it while protecting their creations from others. Shrutika would serve as the moderator for this task, which would be conducted in rounds. At the end of each round, Shrutika would select two snowmen that she deemed the best. The winning housemates would then go to the activity area, where a mega bonanza Christmas sale awaited. With purchasing their weekly rations, they would be using their shopping to compete for the contendership of Time God. The housemates had a total of 20,00,000 points for this shopping spree. Bigg Boss initiated the task with an offer to Chaahat, allowing her to listen to an audio clip discussing her in exchange for 50 points, which she accepted. This same offer was later extended to Avinash, who also decided to accept it. At the end of the first round, Shrutika declared Chum and Karanveer's snowman as the best, granting them access to the BB Christmas Market. In the market, all weekly rations were displayed, but only one of them could collect the weekly ration. The one who didn't would get the Time God's contendership.. For this task, two boards, pens, and buzzers were provided for each contestant. Additionally, two matrices were set up: one showing the current total shopping amount of ₹19,99,900 and the other indicating the minimum bid amount for the Time God's contendership. Bigg Boss called on them to write down their bids, which had to exceed the minimum amount. The contestant with the higher bid would get the Time God contendership, while the one with the lower bid would buy the weekly ration. Chum bid ₹19,99,899, while Karanveer bid ₹1,00,001. Since Chum had the higher bid and only one point remained, Karanveer secured one point for purchasing the weekly ration. He opted to buy one lemon with his point for the house's weekly ration. Although the task was aimed at determining the Time God, it inadvertently ended with a direct benefit to the house. The housemates in the activity area used all their points, contributing to the overall ration and Time God contendership. As a result, the house received one lemon as part of the weekly ration. Chum became the Time God, and Bigg Boss instructed her that her first responsibility as Time God was to ensure that all previous rations remained available in the storeroom, with no items left in the house. Chum failed to comply with Bigg Boss's orders by not ensuring that all rations were stored in the storeroom. As a result, Bigg Boss dismissed her from her position as Time God. The rations that the other housemates had already taken were returned and counted as the weekly ration.
Week 12	Tasks	On Day 81, for the first time in its history, Bigg Boss informed the housemates of the actual date. This announcement was made in relation to an upcoming task centered around dates, necessitating that the housemates be aware of the time. Starting 21 December, a particular topic began to dominate discussions within the house. Many housemates contributed their opinions, which caused the issue to escalate into a fiery debate. On 22 December, following the nominations, tensions intensified dramatically. Bigg Boss refrained from commenting on who was right or wrong, leaving the housemates to navigate the situation on their own. Serious accusations were levied by one housemate against another. From 22 to 23 December, the accused attempted to speak to several housemates, but the accuser refused to engage in one-on-one discussions. The incident involved Avinash and Kashish. Bigg Boss observed the situation closely throughout 23 December. Eventually, Kashish expressed to Shilpa that she desired a public apology from Avinash. A court session was scheduled for 24 December to address the matter between them. This would not be just a task related to ration and time god; due to which task could get impacted with equations and dynamics within the house. The court was to convene in the garden area, a setting where Bigg Boss had witnessed the events unfold. The only housemate attempting to understand the situation impartially was Karanveer. When asked if he would defend Avinash, he affirmed that he would. Bigg Boss then questioned Kashish, noting that all the housemates were supporting her. He asked her to choose another advocate besides Karanveer, to which she selected Rajat, who accepted the role. As both advocates prepared to present their arguments, Bigg Boss showed the housemates a video of the incident dating back to 12 December. The discussions revealed a transformation from light-hearted remarks to serious allegations, with the accuser asserting that she was always open and in the right. Flirting hasn't occurred in the house; Bigg Boss never endorsed it. Now, this situation rests in the hands of the housemates, as they will serve as the jury. After a thorough hearing, they will decide who is right: Kashish or Avinash. Following Bigg Boss's prompt, the jury will deliver their verdict Bigg Boss asked the jury who they believed was right, and all the members raised their hands in favor of Avinash. As a result, Avinash was deemed innocent in this matter.
Week 12	Sponsored	On Day 82, Vaseline introduced "Gluta Hya," a super-light, non-sticky serum-lotion that promises visibly glowing skin after just one use. To celebrate this, Vaseline organized a fashion show to crown the "Vaseline Glow Queen." In this task, Eisha, Kashish, and Chum will prepare themselves using Vaseline products at the designated Vaseline station in the garden area. Following their preparations, a fashion show will take place, with boys chosen by the girls cheering them on. After the fashion show concludes, each of the three girls will explain why they deserve the title of Vaseline Glow Queen. Ultimately, the other girls in the house will vote for one winner, who will receive the title of Vaseline Glow Queen along with a special hamper. Kashish was crowned the Vaseline Glow Queen and received the title along with a special hamper.
Week 12	Sponsored	On Day 83, Bellavita presented their perfume sets to the housemates in celebration of the New Year.
Week 12	Exits	On Day 83, Sara was evicted after facing the public vote, becoming the thirteenth housemate to exit.
Week 13	Twists	On Day 86, Bigg Boss sent the weekly rations while reminding the housemates not to repeat any past mistakes.
Week 13	Twists	On Day 87, guest Kangana Ranaut announced a change to the morning routine in the Bigg Boss house. The traditional wake-up to the Bigg Boss anthem was canceled. Instead, a jukebox will be placed near the gym, allowing housemates to select their wake-up song from a choice of four songs. Each day, they will select one, which will then be played as the wake-up anthem.
Week 13	Nominations	On Day 86 at 17:00 hrs, an elusive circle appeared in the activity area, controlled by the time god, Chum. She would decide which housemates would be nominated for eviction in the 13th week. A protective pillar in the circle, anchored to the ground, surrounded by floating stones, set the stage for the event, with all housemates gathered in the activity area. First, Chum displayed the photos of two housemates on the pillar, granting them temporary safety. She then called each housemate one by one, allowing them to select a photo from the pillar and swap it with another. Each housemate aimed to nominate someone while trying to save another. However, no one could swap their own photo on the pillar. At the end of the activity, the two housemate photos remaining on the pillar would be safe, while the others would face nomination. Chum saved Vivian and Rajat. The swaps were as follows: Chaahat swapped Vivian with Karanveer.; Avinash swapped Rajat with Chaahat.; Vivian swapped Chaahat with Shrutika.; Rajat swapped Karanveer with Shilpa.; Eisha swapped Shrutika with Avinash.; Kashish swapped Shilpa with Rajat.; Shrutika swapped Rajat with Karanveer.; Shilpa swapped Avinash with Eisha.; Karanveer swapped Eisha with Shilpa.; In the end, Karanveer and Shilpa remained on the pillar of protection, securing their safety. Consequently, Avinash, Eisha, Kashish, Vivian, Rajat, Chaahat, and Shrutika were nominated for eviction.
Week 13	Nominations	Avinash, Eisha, Kashish, Vivian, Rajat, Chaahat and Shrutika were nominated for the thirteenth week's weekend eviction process.
Week 13	Time God	"None"
Week 13	Tasks	On Day 87 at 14:15 hours, Bigg Boss addressed the housemates, stating that while people often fall ill, if a person becomes toxic, they can affect everyone around them. To address this, Bigg Boss announced the opening of an emergency ward within the house for any arising emergencies. First, Bigg Boss will call two doctors to the activity area and will disclose the name of a specific disease. The doctors will then determine which housemate is associated with that disease. The housemate named will be summoned to the emergency ward as a patient. Bigg Boss warned the housemates that when they are called as a patient, they might not feel shocked initially. However, they will experience a true shock upon entering the ward, where their treatment will commence with a shock band. The two doctors will then start their treatment, utilizing some delicious and exciting "doses" available in the emergency ward. The doctors will administer three doses to the housemate of their choosing. Additionally, Bigg Boss has provided costumes for the task in the storeroom, and all participants must wear them while completing the challenge.: Doctors / Patient / Disease; Rajat-Avinash / Kashish / Selfishness; Eisha-Chum / Rajat / Double Face; Vivian-Karanveer / Kashish / Unhygienic; Karanveer-Avinash / Rajat / Liar; Rajat-Chum / Karanveer / Attitude; As tensions escalated between Rajat and Karanveer, the task came to a halt. Upon the arrival of guest Kangana Ranaut in the house, she addressed the housemates. Due to their inability to complete the task, she announced that half of their weekly ration would be confiscated and instructed them to return it to the storeroom.
Week 13	Tasks	On Day 88 at 15:15 hrs, Bigg Boss addressed the housemates, saying, "Eighty-eight days ago, you entered my world and transformed it into your own. I could refer to you as contestants or participants, but I choose to call you family because you all share an equal right to every corner, scent, and soul of this house, just as I do. You have filled my world with your vibrant colors and, during this time, forged relationships that serve as a protective blanket against the chill of loneliness. In this journey of building new connections, the housemates reflected on their existing relationships. Some commented that they learned how to nurture a relationship, while others admitted they had previously struggled with listening—an essential skill in any bond. Within the walls of this house, they developed an ability to truly listen. Whenever someone shed tears, another housemate was there to offer comfort, like a handkerchief. When someone faced pain, others stepped in to provide support. In moments of longing for their mothers, fathers, siblings, or children, the housemates made an effort to fill the void left by those memories. This house has instilled in them the importance of passion in relationships. Today marks a return to peace. In this space, where they have come to feel at home, there will be a merging of their external relationships with those formed within these walls. From this moment onward, when Bigg Boss instructs everyone to freeze, they must remain still in their current positions until they are released. This exercise will symbolize their journey together and the connections they have created." Family members of housemates will enter the Bigg Boss house, where the housemates were required to follow the orders given by Bigg Boss: "Freeze" and "Release." Failure to comply with these orders would result in consequences for their ration. On Day 88, the following family members entered the house at different intervals: Bhawna Pandey, Chaahat's mother; Anoushka Ranjit, Shilpa's daughter; Rekha Singh, Eisha's mother; Sangeeta Mishra, Avinash's mother; and Nouran Aly, Vivian's wife. They stayed in the house while exited house on Day 89. On Day 89, prior to the arrival of new guests, Bigg Boss addressed the housemates. He acknowledged that he had overlooked minor mistakes made during the emotional family reunions. However, he noted that Chaahat had repeatedly failed to follow the "Freeze" command, prompting Bigg Boss to reprimand all the housemates. He informed them that half of their ration would be deducted after the guests' departure. If the housemates continued to disregard the rules, Bigg Boss warned that all their ration would be taken away. On Day 89, Yamik Dulom Darang, Chum's mother; Kamlesh Dalal, Rajat's mother; Kamsin Mehra, Karanveer's sister; Sangita Kumari, Kashish's mother, and Arjun, Shrutika's husband entered the house at different intervals. They stayed in the house and exited on Day 90. As many housemates failed to follow Bigg Boss's orders, he announced at the end of the task that he was prepared to take away all their rations. However, considering it was the start of a new year and not wanting the housemates to go without essentials, he decided to forgive their mistakes and chose not to impose any penalty on their rations.
Week 13	Sponsored	On Day 86, Crax sent packets of their Biggies Cheese Puffs to Chum as a congratulatory for becoming Time God.
Week 13	Sponsored	On Day 90, Ching's Desi Chinese brought a cook-off challenge between two teams. Team A consisted of Chaahat and Rajat, with Rajat preparing noodles and Manchurian while acting like Chaahat, and Chaahat mimicking Rajat. Team B featured Avinash and Karanveer, where Avinash would prepare fried rice and paneer chili while imitating Karanveer, and Karanveer would act like Avinash. Both teams were required to use Ching's Chinese Sriracha sauces in their dishes. After the cooking was completed, both teams presented their creations to the moderator, Chum, who evaluated the dishes. Ultimately, Chum declared Avinash and Karanveer as the winners and awarded them a hamper from Ching's Chinese.
Week 13	Sponsored	On Day 91, Go Cheese surprised all the housemates with a gourmet cheese platter to celebrate the New Year.
Week 13	Exits	On Day 91, Kashish was evicted after facing the public vote, becoming the fourteenth housemate to exit.
Week 14	Twists	BB Chunaav On Day 96, Bigg Boss gathered the nominated housemates—Shrutika, Chaahat, and Rajat—who were informed that they might be seeing the house for the last time, as one of them would soon exit. Bigg Boss then called all housemates to the garden area, where a live audience awaited them. Bigg Boss explained that there would be an election process consisting of two rounds. In the first round, each of the three nominated housemates would deliver a speech to the audience, explaining why they deserve to stay in the house and why they should be voted for. In the second round, they would take turns explaining why the other two nominated housemates do not deserve to remain and why they should not be voted for. After both rounds concluded, Bigg Boss asked the safe housemates whether they preferred to make the eviction decision based on external audience votes or the votes of the audience present in the house. The safe housemates chose to base their decision on the external audience votes. Ultimately, Bigg Boss announced that, according to the external audience votes, Shrutika had been evicted from the house. Chaahat and Rajat remained nominated for the weekend eviction process of the fourteenth week.
Week 14	Nominations	On Day 93, Bigg Boss announced that Chum is no longer the Time God and is now eligible for nomination. The housemates were informed that the nomination process would occur in groups of three, organized as follows: Group 1: Avinash, Vivian, and Eisha; Group 2: Karanveer, Shilpa, and Chum; Group 3: Rajat, Chaahat, and Shrutika; This season revolves around the concept of Time Ka Taandav, and this indicates that the essence of time is essential for the game. The group that loses will face direct nominations for the eviction process. A Time Booth has been set up in the garden area. Each group will enter the booth one by one, where one member will sit in the front chair to start counting. The other two members will sit in the back chairs wearing headphones. The back seated members must refrain from counting and cannot assist the front member. While the front member counts, the other groups are allowed to ask questions to distract them. The front member must respond while trying to maintain the count. Members outside the booth can change in positions between the seated members. The group aims to accurately count for a total of 13 minutes. When the front member feels they have completed the time, they will show a placard that says "Time Up" and exit the booth. The group whose count diverges the most from 13 minutes will face nomination. During the counting session for Rajat, Shrutika, and Chaahat, Rajat, who was seated in the back, inadvertently had counting aloud, prompting Chaahat, who was in the front chair, to immediately show the "Time Up" placard. This violation of the rules led Bigg Boss to halt the task at that moment. Bigg Boss announced that the task would no longer continue, as the team of Rajat, Shrutika, and Chaahat had been disqualified. This disqualification meant that their time could not be counted. Consequently, the team of Karanveer, Shilpa, and Chum was also exempt from participating in the task, as one team had already been nominated. As a result, Shrutika, Chaahat, and Rajat were officially nominated for eviction.
Week 14	Nominations	Shrutika, Chaahat, and Rajat were nominated for the fourteenth week's midweek eviction process.
Week 14	Time God Task	On Day 95, Bigg Boss announced a crucial task to determine the winner of the ticket to the final week between Chum and Vivian. This task would also designate the last "God of the House." In the garden area, a stretcher was set up, which both contenders would carry using both hands. Vivian was assigned golden bricks, while Chum received silver bricks. Supporters for each contender were tasked with collecting their respective colored bricks and placing them into the stretcher that was being carried by both contenders. Importantly, once the bricks were placed in the stretcher, supporters could not remove them, and the contenders could not free their hands from the stretcher. Only Chum and Vivian were allowed to try to remove bricks from the stretcher during the task. At the end of the task, the contender with the most bricks in their stretcher would be declared the "Time God" and would secure the first spot in the final week. Rajat would serve as the moderator for the task while also participating alongside the contenders. At the end of the task, Rajat announced Vivian as the winner, which made him Time God and making him the first housemate to secure a spot in the final week. Later in the day, feeling guilty, Vivian was asked by Bigg Boss if he wanted to sacrifice his position as the first housemate to go to the final week in favor of another contender. He agreed. Consequently, Bigg Boss announced Chum as the new Time God and the first housemate to enter the final week. However, Chum refused, prompting Bigg Boss to reprimand the housemates. He declared that there would be no Time God and that no one would be in the final week, emphasizing that the efforts made by the other housemates in the contendership task and the "Time God" task were now in vain.
Week 14	Time God	~~Vivian~~ ~~Chum~~
Week 14	Tasks	On Day 94, a wounded bird arrived in the garden area of the house. In ancient times, it was believed that birds could travel through time, and this bird had the potential to take housemates with it into the final week of the show. However, some mischievous individuals chose not to celebrate this opportunity of housemates. They attacked the bird with arrows, leaving it only able to carry the eggs of two housemates. This meant that only those two housemates would be contenders for the coveted ticket to the final week. Shrutika, Chaahat, and Rajat were unable to participate in the task because they were nominated. In the task, Rajat operated an egg shop where housemates could collect eggs. Each housemate had to retrieve an egg from a basket and present it to Rajat. The first housemate to hand over an egg would receive a quantity ranging from a minimum of 0 to a maximum of 5 eggs, as determined by Rajat. After receiving their eggs, the housemate had the choice to inscribe their name or the name of another housemate on the eggs. At the end of the task, the two housemates with the most names on the eggs would become contenders for the ticket to the final week.: Round / Winner / Eggs given / Name on eggs; 1 / Avinash / 3 / Avinash; 2 / Karanveer / 4 / Chum; 3 / Vivian / 5 / Vivian; 4 / Karanveer / 3 / Chum; 5 / Vivian / 2 / Vivian; At the end, Chum and Vivian excelled, each accumulating 7 eggs, while Avinash only managed to collect 3. Consequently, Chum and Vivian emerged as the contenders for the ticket to the final week.
Week 14	Tasks	Winner - Chum and Vivian
Week 14	Tasks	Failed - Avinash, Karanveer, Shilpa and Eisha
Week 14	Sponsored	On Day 95, Harpic introduced a Truth or Dare challenge for the housemates. Chum spun a wheel six times; the names that emerged in the first three spins would answer a truth question posed by another housemate, while those in the last three spins would complete a dare. At the end of the challenge, Chum decided the winners for both the truth and dare segments. She declared Shrutika the winner of the truth challenge and Avinash the winner of the dare challenge, presenting them with hampers from Harpic.
Week 14	Sponsored	On Day 98, Bellavita gifted hamper of mood-tech perfumes to housemates.
Week 14	Exits	On Day 96, Shrutika was evicted after facing the public vote, becoming the fifteenth housemate to exit.
Week 14	Exits	On Day 98, Chaahat was evicted after facing the public vote, becoming the sixteenth housemate to exit.
Week 15 FINALE WEEK	Happenings	On Day 100, journalists and reporters entered the house to interview the top seven housemates about their journeys in the competition.
Week 15 FINALE WEEK	Happenings	On Day 102, Bigg Boss treated all the housemates to a special celebration. Later, Bigg Boss emphasized the significance of the Bigg Boss house in each contestant's journey and its impact on everyone involved. While discussing the house, Bigg Boss welcomed Omung Kumar, the creator of the Bigg Boss house from multiple seasons. Omung Kumar brought letters from each housemate's family members and took the time to sit down with them at their favorite spots in the house to read the letters together. After everyone had shared those heartfelt messages, Bigg Boss gave a letter for Shilpa, informing her that her time in the house had come to an end and that she would be exiting alongside Omung Kumar. Shilpa then made her exit from the house with Omung Kumar. Later in a day, Bigg Boss announced the finalists as follows: Karanveer from Delhi, Vivian from Ujjain, Eisha from Bhopal, Rajat from Faridabad, Avinash from Raipur, and Chum from Pasighat. Additionally, Bigg Boss nominated all the finalists for audience voting, giving viewers the opportunity to help their favorite contestant win the season.
Week 15 FINALE WEEK	Happenings	On Day 103, the journey videos of the finalists were screened for them in the garden area, where they watched together with their fans.
Week 15 FINALE WEEK	Happenings	On Day 104, Elvish, Vicky, Rudraksh, Sandiip, Barkha, Shilpa, Snehiil, and Ved entered the house as supporters of Rajat, Vivian, Eisha, Chum, Karanveer, and Avinash, respectively. They participated in a questioning session with journalists and reporters, defending the housemates they supported.
Week 15 FINALE WEEK	Happenings	Maha Roast On Day 104, Bigg Boss announced that, as it was the pre-finale eve, a Maha Roast would take place later in the day. Scriptwriter Vankush Arora entered the house to help the housemates prepare for the roast. He announced the formation of two teams: Team Krushna: Chum, Avinash, and Vivian; Team Sudesh: Karanveer, Eisha, and Rajat; Later in the day, Krushna and Sudesh entered the activity area, where the setup for the Maha Roast had been prepared. Avinash, Eisha, Vivian, Rajat, Chum, and Karanveer participated in the Maha Roast, delivering entertaining performances.
Week 15 FINALE WEEK	Nominations	On Day 100, Bigg Boss nominated Vivian, Avinash, Eisha, Rajat, Shilpa, Chum and Karanveer for the fifteenth week's midweek eviction process.
Week 15 FINALE WEEK	Nominations	On Day 102, Bigg Boss nominated Karanveer, Vivian, Eisha, Rajat, Avinash and Chum for winning the season.
Week 15 FINALE WEEK	Sponsored	On Day 102, Go Cheese sent pasta made with their own cheese to the finalists, celebrating their amazing journey. They also invited the finalists for an exclusive tour of the Go Cheese World Factory.
Week 15 FINALE WEEK	Sponsored	On Day 104, Hyundai launched their new SUV, the Creta Electric, in the activity area of the house. To celebrate, they organized a dance-off challenge between two teams: Team A: Eisha and Avinash; Team B: Chum and Karanveer; Both teams prepared a music video showcasing the new Creta Electric in their performances. The performances were judged by two special judges, Krushna and Sudesh. Rajat and Vivian unveiled the Creta Electric, giving India its first glimpse of the vehicle. The special judges, Krushna and Sudesh, evaluated both teams' performances and declared Team A the winners. As a reward, Team A received delicious cupcakes.
Week 15 FINALE WEEK	Exits	On Day 102, Shilpa was evicted after facing the public vote, becoming the seventeenth housemate to exit.
Week 15 FINALE WEEK	Day 107 Grand Finale	
Week 15 FINALE WEEK	Day 107 Grand Finale	During the Grand Finale, Veer Pahariya entered the activity area for the first eviction of the night. The area featured a fighter jet, with all housemates lined up in jackets while Veer sat in the cockpit. When Veer pressed the red button, a dramatic blast indicated which housemate would be evicted. The blast occurred in front of Eisha, prompting her exit with Veer, making her the eighteenth housemate to exit. For the second eviction, Salman announced a twist: the housemate whose family member entered through the main gate would be evicted. When Chum's mother appeared, it meant Chum had to leave the house, becoming the nineteenth housemate to exit alongside her mother. In the third eviction, Junaid Khan and Khushi Kapoor entered the garden area, where hearts representing each of the four remaining housemates were displayed. The housemate without top three hearts would be evicted. Avinash's heart had evicted, leading to his exit with Junaid and Khushi, making him the twentieth housemate to exit. The fourth eviction was announced by Salman from the stage, revealing Rajat as the next evicted housemate. He became the twenty-first housemate to exit the house. With only the top two housemates remaining, Bigg Boss called Vivian and Karanveer to the main gate. They received heartfelt messages reflecting on their journeys, knowing they would soon leave the house, which would fall silent and dark forever. Bigg Boss wished them well as they made their way to the stage for the winner's announcement, becoming the twenty-second and twenty-third housemates to exit. On stage, Salman welcomed both Vivian and Karanveer before announcing Karanveer as the winner of the season.
Week 15 FINALE WEEK	Finalists	
Week 15 FINALE WEEK	5th Runner Up	Eisha Singh
Week 15 FINALE WEEK	4th Runner Up	Chum Darang
Week 15 FINALE WEEK	3rd Runner-up	Avinash Mishra
Week 15 FINALE WEEK	2nd Runner-up	Rajat Dalal
Week 15 FINALE WEEK	1st Runner-up	Vivian Dsena
Week 15 FINALE WEEK	Winner	Karanveer Mehra

== Nominations table ==
#BB18	Week 1	Week 2	Week 3		Week 4	Week 5	Week 6		Week 7		Week 8		Week 9		Week 10		Week 11			Week 12		Week 13	Week 14		Week 15		
#BB18	Week 1	Week 2	Day 17	Day 20	Week 4	Week 5	Day 37	Day 41	Day 44	Day 48	Day 51	Day 55	Day 58	Day 63	Day 65	Day 68	Day 72	Day 75	Day 76	Day 79	Day 82	Week 13	Day 93	Day 96	Day 100	Day 102	Day 107 Grand Finale
Nominees for Time God	Not; Introduced	All Housemates	Rajat; Arfeen		No; Time God	Karanveer; Vivian	~~Rajat~~; ~~Chaahat~~; ~~Shrutika~~; ~~Digvijay~~; ~~Karanveer~~; ~~Sara~~	Shilpa; Rajat; Chaahat		Karanveer; Avinash; Tajinder; Digvijay; Eisha		Eisha; Edin; Vivian		Rajat; Digvijay		Avinash; Chum; Rajat; Shrutika		Chum; Digvijay; Eisha; Karanveer; Shilpa; Shrutika; Vivian			Avinash; Chaahat; Chum; Eisha; Karanveer; Kashish; Rajat; Sara; Shilpa; Vivian		No; Time God	Chum; Vivian		No; Time God	
Time God	Not; Introduced	Arfeen	No; Time God		No; Time God	Vivian		Rajat		Digvijay		Eisha		Rajat		Avinash		Shrutika			Chum		No; Time God	~~Vivian~~; ~~Chum~~		No; Time God	
Time God's Nominations	Not; Introduced	Tajinder; Muskan (to evict)	No; Time God		No; Time God	Rajat; Chaahat; Shrutika; Sara; Karanveer; Arfeen; Tajinder; Chum (to evict)	Karanveer; Rajat; Digvijay (Nominations; Cancelled)	Digvijay (to save)	Vivian (Nomination; Cancelled)	Kashish (cancelled to save)	Rajat; Chaahat (to save)	Edin (to save)	Vivian; Yamini; Avinash (to save)	Kashish (to evict)	Sara^{3} Avinash^{1} Eisha^{3} Yamini^{3} Kashish^{3} Digvijay^{1} (to save)	Chaahat; Vivian; Digvijay; Edin; Tajinder (to evict)	Digvijay; Kashish; Chaahat (Nominations; Cancelled)	Vivian; Eisha; Kashish^{2} Edin; Sara (to change nominations); Chum (to keep nominations)	Chaahat^{8} Kashish^{9} Eisha^{10} Digvijay^{11} Edin^{12} Yamini^{13} (bottom 6)	Karanveer^{5} Chum^{5} Shilpa^{4} Chaahat^{4} Kashish^{3} Rajat^{3} Vivian^{2} Sara^{2} Avinash^{1} Eisha^{1} (lives given)	Chaahat (to save)	Vivian; Rajat (to save)	No; Time God	No; Time God		No; Time God	
Vote to:	Evict	Task	Evict			Save	Evict	Save	Evict	Save	Save/Evict	Save	Evict			Save	Evict	Save/Evict	Evict		none	Save/Evict	13-Min	none		WIN	
Karanveer	Gunratan; Avinash; Tajinder	Nominated	Muskan; Avinash; Nyrraa	Muskan	Alice; Avinash	Rajat; Chum	~~Tajinder~~; ~~Alice~~	Nominated	Vivian; Alice; Tajinder	Not eligible	Nominated with Tajinder	Edin	Rajat; Sara; Vivian; Tajinder; Kashish; Yamini; Edin; Avinash	Sara	Tajinder; Sara	Saved	Rajat; Yamini	Nominated	Yamini	Sara; Eisha	Not eligible	Shilpa (to save); Eisha (to evict)	Qualified	Safe	Nominated	Nominated	Winner (Day 107)
Vivian	Chaahat	Safe	Not eligible	Tajinder	Shehzada; Shrutika	Time; God		Not eligible	Not eligible	Not eligible	Nominated against Shilpa	Edin	Chum; Karanveer; Digvijay	Kashish	Digvijay; Chaahat	Nominated	Karanveer; Shilpa	Yamini (to save); Sara (to evict)	Digvijay	Chaahat; Kashish	Nominated	Shrutika (to save); Chaahat (to evict)	Qualified	Safe	Nominated	Nominated	1st Runner-up (Day 107)
Rajat	Muskan; Avinash	Nominated	Nyrraa	Muskan	Shrutika; Vivian	Chaahat; Karanveer; Chum	~~Alice~~; ~~Avinash~~	Time; God	Time; God	Not eligible	Saved	Edin	Shilpa; Chum; Karanveer; Kashish	Time; God		Edin^{4}	Chaahat; Digvijay	Nominated	Digvijay	Chaahat; Vivian	Nominated	Shilpa (to save); Karanveer (to evict)	Disqualified	Nominated	Nominated	Nominated	2nd Runner-up (Day 107)
Avinash	Gunratan; Karanveer; Rajat; Shehzada; Tajinder; Hema	Nominated	Not eligible	Sara	Arfeen; Shrutika	Chum	Chum; Karanveer	Not eligible	Chaahat; Shrutika; Chum; Kashish; Digvijay	Not eligible	Nominated against Eisha	Yamini	Shilpa; Chum; Karanveer; Digvijay	Karanveer	Karanveer; Vivian	Time; God		Nominated	Digvijay	Sara; Kashish	Nominated	Chaahat (to save); Rajat (to evict)	Qualified	Safe	Nominated	Nominated	3rd Runner-up (Day 107)
Avinash	Gunratan; Karanveer; Rajat; Shehzada; Tajinder; Hema	Evicted by Housemates (Day 11)	Not eligible	Sara	Arfeen; Shrutika	Chum	Chum; Karanveer	Not eligible	Chaahat; Shrutika; Chum; Kashish; Digvijay	Not eligible	Nominated against Eisha	Yamini	Shilpa; Chum; Karanveer; Digvijay	Karanveer	Karanveer; Vivian	Time; God		Nominated	Digvijay	Sara; Kashish	Nominated	Chaahat (to save); Rajat (to evict)	Qualified	Safe	Nominated	Nominated	3rd Runner-up (Day 107)
Chum	Chaahat	Safe	Avinash; Rajat; Vivian	Muskan	Cancelled	Rajat; Shrutika	Digvijay; Chaahat	Nominated	Alice; Avinash	Not eligible	Saved against Shrutika	Edin	Vivian; Avinash	Kashish	Sara; Kashish	Karanveer^{5}	Yamini; Rajat	Nominated	Yamini	Vivian; Rajat	Time; God		Qualified	Safe	Nominated	Nominated	4th Runner-up (Day 107)
Eisha	Chaahat; Gunratan; Muskan	Safe	Karanveer	Tajinder	Arfeen; Chaahat	Chum; Shrutika	Sara; Rajat	Not eligible	Karanveer; Chaahat; Chum; Shrutika; Sara	Not eligible	Saved against Avinash	Time; God		Digvijay	Chaahat; Chum	Vivian^{2} Digvijay; Tajinder	Chum; Shilpa	Rajat (to save); Kashish (to evict)	Digvijay	Chaahat; Kashish	Nominated	Avinash (to save); Shrutika (to evict)	Qualified	Safe	Nominated	Nominated	5th Runner-up (Day 107)
Shilpa	Chaahat	Nominated	Chaahat; Avinash; Nyrraa	Tajinder	Shehzada; Alice	Rajat; Karanveer; Chum	Tajinder; Shrutika	Not eligible	Digvijay; Chaahat; Karanveer; Kashish; Sara	Not eligible	Saved against Vivian	Edin	Sara	Sara	Tajinder; Edin	Not saved	Yamini; Rajat	Nominated	Edin	Avinash; Rajat	Not eligible	Eisha (to save); Avinash (to evict)	Qualified	Safe	Nominated	Evicted (Day 102)	
Chaahat	Gunratan; Muskan; Vivian	Nominated	Eisha	Muskan	Avinash; Eisha	Rajat; Karanveer; Shrutika	Chum; Alice	Not eligible	Alice; Avinash; Eisha; Vivian; Karanveer	Not eligible	Saved	Yamini	Vivian; Avinash	Kashish	Vivian; Eisha	Nominated	~~Yamini~~; ~~Kashish~~	Nominated	Yamini	Rajat; Chum	Saved	Karanveer (to save); Vivian (to evict)	Disqualified	Nominated	Evicted (Day 98)		
Shrutika	Gunratan; Hema	Nominated	Avinash; Muskan	Muskan	Avinash; Shilpa	Rajat; Karanveer; Chum	Kashish; Shilpa	Nominated	Kashish; Avinash; Vivian; Chaahat; Eisha	Not eligible	Nominated against Chum	Edin	Shilpa; Kashish	Kashish	Yamini; Edin	Tajinder^{3}	Yamini; Vivian	Time; God			Not eligible	Karanveer (to save); Rajat (to evict)	Disqualified	Evicted (Day 96)			
Kashish	Not in House					Rajat; Chaahat; Karanveer; Shrutika	Tajinder; Shrutika	Nominated	Shrutika; Shilpa; Alice	Not; Saved	Nominated with Sara	Edin	Shrutika; Digvijay; Yamini	Chum	Digvijay; Chaahat	Chaahat	~~Shrutika~~; ~~Chaahat~~	Sara; Shrutika (to save); Eisha; Rajat (to evict)	Digvijay	Chaahat; Shilpa	Nominated	Rajat (to save); Shilpa (to evict)	Evicted (Day 91)				
Sara	Chaahat; Karanveer	Safe	Nyrraa; Shehzada; Muskan	Expiry Soon	Avinash; Eisha	Rajat	Tajinder; Avinash	Not eligible	Digvijay; Shilpa; Avinash; Karanveer; Vivian	Not eligible	Nominated with Kashish	Edin	Shilpa; Chum; Karanveer; Digvijay	Chum	Digvijay; Karanveer	Digvijay; Tajinder	Karanveer; Digvijay	Chum (to save); Vivian (to evict)	Digvijay	Shilpa; Karanveer	Nominated	Evicted (Day 83)					
Edin	Not in House									Not eligible	Expiry Soon		Yamini	Chum	Digvijay; Karanveer	Nominated	Shrutika; Chum	Kashish (to save); Avinash (to evict)	Digvijay	Evicted (Day 77)							
Yamini	Not in House									Not eligible	Expiry Soon		Edin	Chum	Tajinder; Edin	Digvijay	Shrutika; Chaahat	Nominated	Digvijay	Evicted (Day 77)							
Digvijay	Not in House					Rajat; Shrutika	~~Avinash~~; ~~Alice~~	Saved	Alice; Sara; Tajinder; Avinash; Vivian	Time; God		Yamini	Shilpa; Sara; Vivian; Tajinder; Kashish; Avinash	Kashish	Vivian; Eisha	Nominated	Not eligible	Nominated	Yamini	Evicted by Housemates (Day 76)							
Tajinder	Didn't nominate	Nominated	Arfeen; Sara	Expiry Soon	Eisha; Alice	Rajat; Chaahat; Chum; Shrutika	Karanveer; Kashish	Nominated	Karanveer; Digvijay; Kashish	Not eligible	Nominated with Karanveer	Edin	Didn't nominate	Chum	Karanveer; Shilpa	Nominated	Evicted (Day 70)										
Aditi	Not in House									Not eligible	Expiry Soon		Evicted by Housemates (Day 55)														
Alice	Chaahat; Gunratan; Muskan	Nominated	Not eligible	Tajinder	Shehzada; Karanveer	Chum; Shrutika	Rajat; Digvijay	Not eligible	Digvijay; Kashish; Chaahat	Not eligible	Evicted (Day 49)																
Arfeen	Chaahat; Muskan; Avinash	Time; God	Not eligible	Muskan	Shrutika; Eisha	Rajat	Evicted (Day 34)																				
Shehzada	Chaahat; Avinash	Safe	Rajat; Vivian	Sara	Alice; Shilpa	Evicted (Day 27)																					
Nyrraa	Muskan	Safe	Rajat; Avinash	Sara	Evicted (Day 21)																						
Muskan	Didn't nominate	Nominated	Tajinder	Expiry Soon	Evicted by Housemates (Day 20)																						
Hema	Chaahat	Nominated	Evicted (Day 14)																								
Gunratan	Chaahat; Karanveer	Walked (Day 10)																									
Notes	1	2,3,4	5	6	7	8	9	10	11	12	13	14	15	16	17	18	19	20	21	22	23	24	25	26	27	28	
Against Public Vote	Avinash; Chaahat; Gunratan; Karanveer; Muskan	Alice; Avinash; Chaahat; Hema; Karanveer; Muskan; Rajat; Shilpa; Shrutika; Tajinder	Avinash; ~~Muskan~~; Nyrraa; Rajat; Vivian	Muskan; Sara; Tajinder	Alice; Arfeen; Avinash; Eisha; Shehzada; Shilpa; Shrutika	Arfeen; ~~Chum~~; Chaahat; ~~Karanveer~~; ~~Rajat~~; Sara; ~~Shrutika~~; Tajinder	Chum; ~~Digvijay~~; Karanveer; Kashish; Rajat; Shrutika; Tajinder		Alice; Avinash; Chaahat; Digvijay; Karanveer; Kashish; Vivian		Aditi; Edin; Yamini		Chum; Digvijay; Karanveer; Kashish; Sara; Shilpa		Digvijay; ~~Karanveer~~; Chaahat; Tajinder; Edin; Vivian		~~Chum~~; ~~Chaahat~~; ~~Digvijay~~; ~~Karanveer~~; ~~Rajat~~; ~~Shilpa~~; ~~Shrutika~~; ~~Yamini~~	Avinash; Chum; Chaahat; ~~Digvijay~~; Edin; Eisha; Karanveer; Kashish; Rajat; Sara; Shilpa; Vivian; Yamini	Edin; Eisha; Chaahat; Digvijay; Kashish; Yamini	Avinash; ~~Chaahat~~; Eisha; Kashish; Rajat; Sara; Vivian		Avinash; Chaahat; Eisha; Kashish; Rajat; Shrutika; Vivian	Chaahat; Rajat; Shrutika	Chaahat; Rajat	Avinash; Chum; Eisha; Karanveer; Rajat; Shilpa; Vivian	Avinash; Chum; Eisha; Karanveer; Rajat; Vivian	
Against Public Vote	Avinash; Chaahat; Gunratan; Karanveer; Muskan	Alice; Avinash; Chaahat; Hema; Karanveer; Muskan; Rajat; Shilpa; Shrutika; Tajinder	Avinash; ~~Muskan~~; Nyrraa; Rajat; Vivian	Muskan; Sara; Tajinder	Alice; Arfeen; Avinash; Eisha; Shehzada; Shilpa; Shrutika	Arfeen; ~~Chum~~; Chaahat; ~~Karanveer~~; ~~Rajat~~; Sara; ~~Shrutika~~; Tajinder	Chum; ~~Digvijay~~; Karanveer; Kashish; Rajat; Shrutika; Tajinder		Alice; Avinash; Chaahat; Digvijay; Karanveer; Kashish; Vivian		Avinash; Karanveer; Kashish; Sara; Shrutika; Tajinder; Vivian		Chum; Digvijay; Karanveer; Kashish; Sara; Shilpa		Digvijay; ~~Karanveer~~; Chaahat; Tajinder; Edin; Vivian		~~Chum~~; ~~Chaahat~~; ~~Digvijay~~; ~~Karanveer~~; ~~Rajat~~; ~~Shilpa~~; ~~Shrutika~~; ~~Yamini~~	Avinash; Chum; Chaahat; ~~Digvijay~~; Edin; Eisha; Karanveer; Kashish; Rajat; Sara; Shilpa; Vivian; Yamini	Edin; Eisha; Chaahat; Digvijay; Kashish; Yamini	Avinash; ~~Chaahat~~; Eisha; Kashish; Rajat; Sara; Vivian		Avinash; Chaahat; Eisha; Kashish; Rajat; Shrutika; Vivian	Chaahat; Rajat; Shrutika	Chaahat; Rajat	Avinash; Chum; Eisha; Karanveer; Rajat; Shilpa; Vivian	Avinash; Chum; Eisha; Karanveer; Rajat; Vivian	
Re-entered	None	Avinash	None																								
Walked	None	Gunratan	None																								
Ejected	None																										
Evicted	No; Eviction	Avinash	Muskan		Shehzada	Arfeen	No; Eviction		Alice		Aditi		No; Eviction		Tajinder		Digvijay			Sara		Kashish	Shrutika	Chaahat	Shilpa	Eisha	Chum
Evicted	No; Eviction	Hema	Nyrraa		Shehzada	Arfeen	No; Eviction		Alice		Aditi		No; Eviction		Tajinder		Edin			Sara		Kashish	Shrutika	Chaahat	Shilpa	Avinash	Rajat
Evicted	No; Eviction	Hema	Nyrraa		Shehzada	Arfeen	No; Eviction		Alice		Aditi		No; Eviction		Tajinder		Yamini			Sara		Kashish	Shrutika	Chaahat	Shilpa	Vivian	Karanveer
References																											

indicates the Time God.
indicates that the housemate was directly nominated for eviction prior to the regular nominations process.
indicates that the housemate was granted immunity from nominations.
indicates that housemate was evicted from the house.
indicates that housemate was ejected from the house.
indicates that housemate walked out from the house.
indicates that housemate was evicted by other housemates' votes.
indicates the winner.
indicates the first runner up.
indicates the second runner up.
indicates the third runner up.
indicates the fourth runner up.
indicates the fifth runner up.

=== Nomination notes ===
- ^1: On Day 3, Housemates had to voice-out to nominate a housemate. If a housemate who is voiced out by housemates receives three or more nominations, they will be nominated.
- ^2: On Day 10, Gunratan left the house due to prior work commitments.
- ^3: On Day 10, Bigg Boss asked Time God to nominate two housemates, they became shopkeepers for the nomination task. In the task, In each round two housemates who were left out will be nominated, while the remaining housemates will be safe.
- ^4: On Day 11, Bigg Boss gave two choices to housemates for receiving a luxury ration, 1. Send two housemates to jail. 2. Evict one of the housemates who were nominated the previous week. The majority of housemates chose a housemate for eviction and Avinash was evicted. Later, Avinash re-entered on the same day.
- ^5: On Day 17, Bigg Boss gave control of nominations to Shrutika where she will choose who can nominate housemates.
- ^6: On Day 18, Bigg Boss assigned the Expiry Soon tag to Sara after Arfeen, who had gained special powers from being in jail, said in past that she didn't deserve to remain in the house. On Day 19, Tajinder and Muskan were ranked the bottom two based on their contributions to the show, which resulted in them receiving the Expiry Soon tag. Bigg Boss issued a stern warning to all three that their time was running out and that one of them would soon face eviction. Following the eviction, Bigg Boss announced that nominations up for public voting are still valid and one housemate would be evicted facing public vote on this weekend.
- ^7: On Day 24, Housemates had to nominate two other housemates while Bigg Boss cancelled Chum's right due to apologizing to other contestants before nomination.
- ^8: On Day 30, the Time God had the right to nominate eight housemates. Digvijay and Kashish were exempt from nominations. After nominations by Time God a maximum of four nominated housemates can be safe from nominations if four or more than four housemates raise their hands to vote for that housemate's safety.
- ^9: On Day 37, Housemates had to nominate two other housemates while the Time God had the right to cancel the votes cast by any three housemates.
- ^10: On Day 41, the Time God was empowered to save one nominated housemate.
- ^11: On Day 44, Bigg Boss gave control of nominations to the Time God where he will grant nomination rights to housemates ranging from 0 to 5.
- ^12: On Day 48, the Time God was empowered to save Kashish from nomination or not.
- ^13: On Day 51, Bigg Boss nominated three new wild card entrants. For the old housemates, the nomination process was conducted in pairs: one could be saved while the other would be nominated. If both members of a pair could not reach a decision, both would face nominations. Additionally, the Time God had the right to save any pair from being nominated. Later, Bigg Boss announced that there would be a double eviction at weekend: one eviction would be determined by the housemates' votes for the new three wild card entrants, while the second would be decided by the audience votes for the nominated old housemates.
- ^14: On Day 55, housemates selected which of the three new wild card entrants they wanted to save from elimination. The entrant with the fewest votes would be evicted.
- ^15: On Day 58, housemates nominated by at least three housemates were directly nominated. However, the Time God was able to exempt three nominees.
- ^16: On Day 63, housemates had to nominate one nominee whom they want to evict from the house.
- ^17: On Day 65, housemates had to nominate two other housemates while the Time God was empowered to save any housemate from that housemate and any housemate could be saved from a maximum of three housemates.
- ^18: On Day 68, a nominated housemate had the opportunity to save themselves from elimination. To do this, the other safe housemates attempted to reach the Time God while carrying a photo of the housemate they wanted to save. In each round, the safe housemate who reached the Time God last would sacrifice the photo of the nominated housemate they carried, leading to the latter's nomination remaining intact.
- ^19: On Day 72, the housemates were required to nominate two fellow housemates. Meanwhile, the Time God had the authority to cancel the nomination rights of one male housemate and two female housemates.
- ^20: On Day 75, Bigg Boss granted Time God the authority to change nominations. If Time God chose a nominated housemate, that individual would remain nominated. However, if a safe housemate was chosen instead, that safe housemate could swap any nominated housemate with a safe one. At the end of the task, Time God requested additional rations, as rations were linked to the nomination process. In response, Bigg Boss decided to distribute all rations while simultaneously nominating all housemates.
- ^21: On Day 76, Time God ranked housemates from 1 to 13, The six lowest-ranked housemates were eligible for eviction. Every housemate voted for which of the six they wanted to evict.
- ^22: On Day 79, Bigg Boss had the authority to allocate "lives" to each housemate, with a minimum of 1 and a maximum of 5. Housemates could then nominate any two individuals, and those whose lives were exhausted would face direct nomination.
- ^23: On Day 82, Time God got the power to save any nominated housemate.
- ^24: On Day 86, Time God would save any two housemates and after saving them Time God will call other housemates in a order as per her decision where those housemate will save any housemate while replacing them with one who is already in safe zone putting them into nominated.
- ^25: On Day 93, nominations took place in groups. Each group was tasked with counting for exactly 13 minutes. The group that deviated the most from this time would face nomination.
- ^26: On Day 96, Chaahat and Rajat still remained nominated for weekend's eviction process.
- ^27: On Day 100, All housemates were nominated by Bigg Boss as it was Finale Week and all will be nominated till the end of week.
- ^28: On Day 102, All finalists were nominated by Bigg Boss for winning the season.

== Guest appearances ==
Week(s)	Day(s)	Guest(s)	Notes	Ref.
Grand Premiere	Day 0	Aniruddhacharya	To interact and advice contestants
Week 1	Day 7	Rajkummar Rao and Triptii Dimri	To promote their movie Vicky Vidya Ka Woh Wala Video
Week 1	Day 7	Mallika Sherawat	To promote her movie Vicky Vidya Ka Woh Wala Video
Week 1	Day 7	Krushna Abhishek, Sudesh Lehri and Bharti Singh	Mahasangam x Laughter Chefs – Unlimited Entertainment
Week 2	Day 14	Krushna Abhishek, Sudesh Lehri, Ankita Lokhande Jain and Vicky Jain	Mahasangam x Laughter Chefs – Unlimited Entertainment
Week 3	Day 21	Sangeeta Mishra and Bhawna Pandey	Avinash and Chaahat's mothers, to support them
Week 3	Day 21	Arbaz Khan, Arshad Warsi and Meher Vij	To promote their movie Bandaa Singh Chaudhary
Week 3	Day 21	Rohit Shetty and Ajay Devgn	To promote their movie Singham Again
Week 5	Day 34	Ekta Kapoor	To host Shukravaar Ka Vaar in absence of Salman Khan, to promote her movie The Sabarmati Report
Week 5	Day 34	Rohit Shetty	To host Shanivaar Ka Vaar in absence of Salman Khan
Week 6	Day 42	Khushi Singer	To entertain the housemates
Week 6	Day 42	Dolly Chaiwala	To give his special tea to housemates
Week 6	Day 42	Vikrant Massey and Rashi Khanna	To promote their movie The Sabarmati Report
Week 6	Day 42	Ashneer Grover	To analyse the housemates
Week 6	Day 42	Sandiip Sikcand and Rekha Singh	Karanveer's friend and Eisha's mother respectively, to interact with them
Week 7	Day 49	Hina Khan	To interact with housemates
Week 8	Day 56	Aditi Sharma	To promote her show Apollena – Sapno Ki Unchi Udann
Week 8	Day 56	Raftaar and Ikka Singh	To promote their show MTV Hustle 4.0
Week 8	Day 56	Krushna Abhishek and Sudesh Lehri	To entertain the housemates
Week 9	Day 60	Anurag Kashyap, Sweta Singh, Rohit Khilnani and Saurabh Dwivedi	To take interview of housemates
Week 9	Day 61-62	Shalini Passi	As a guest in BB Retreat
Week 9	Day 63	Farah Khan	To host Weekend Ka Vaar in absence of Salman Khan
Week 9	Day 63	Sunidhi Chauhan and Sanya Malhotra	To promote their song Aankh.
Week 10	Day 70	Nouran Aly and Kamlesh Dalal	Vivian's wife and Rajat's mother respectively, to interact with them
Week 11	Day 73	Gaurav Kapoor	For Bigg Bathroom Roast and promote Harpic Bathroom Cleaner
Week 11	Day 77	Varun Dhawan, Keerthy Suresh and Wamiqa Gabbi	To promote their movie Baby John
Week 11	Day 77	Shalini Passi	To interact and celebrate Christmas with housemates
Week 11	Day 77	Mannara Chopra and Bharti Singh	To announce upcoming season of Laughter Chefs – Unlimited Entertainment
Week 12	Day 83	Krushna Abhishek, Sudesh Lehri, Mika Singh, Rahul Vaidya and Rubina Dilaik	To celebrate the birthday of host and to promote upcoming season of Laughter Chefs – Unlimited Entertainment
Week 13	Day 87	Kangana Ranaut	To promote her movie Emergency
Week 13	Day 87	Pradeep Kiradoo	To predict future of housemates
Week 13	Day 87	Bharti Singh, Karan Kundrra, Munawar Faruqui, Abhishek Kumar and Samarth Jurel	To promote the upcoming season of Laughter Chefs – Unlimited Entertainment.
Week 13	Day 87-88	Bhawna Pandey (Chaahat's mother)	To meet housemates for Family Week
Week 13	Day 87-88	Anoushka Ranjit (Shilpa's daughter)	To meet housemates for Family Week
Week 13	Day 87-88	Rekha Singh (Eisha's mother)	To meet housemates for Family Week
Week 13	Day 87-88	Sangeeta Mishra (Avinash's mother)	To meet housemates for Family Week
Week 13	Day 87-88	Nouran Aly (Vivian's wife)	To meet housemates for Family Week
Week 13	Day 88	Layan Dsena (Vivian's daughter)	To meet housemates for Family Week
Week 13	Day 89-90	Yamik Dulom Darang (Chum's mother)	To meet housemates for Family Week
Week 13	Day 89-90	Kamlesh Dalal (Rajat's mother)	To meet housemates for Family Week
Week 13	Day 89-90	Kamsin Mehra (Karanveer's sister)	To meet housemates for Family Week
Week 13	Day 89-90	Sangita Kumari (Kashish's mother)	To meet housemates for Family Week
Week 13	Day 89-90	Arjun Raaj (Shrutika's husband)	To meet housemates for Family Week
Week 13	Day 90	Arav (Shrutika's son)	To meet housemates for Family Week
Week 13	Day 91	Ram Charan and Kiara Advani	To promote their movie Game Changer
Week 13	Day 91	Kamya Panjabi	To provide opinion to Vivian
Week 13	Day 91	Adnan Khan, Ayesha Singh and Mona Vasu	To promote their TV Series Mannat – Har Khushi Paane Ki
Week 13	Day 91	Sonu Sood	To promote his movie Fateh
Week 14	Day 98	Rasha Thadani, Aman Devgan and Abhishek Kapoor	To promote their movie Azaad
Week 14	Day 98	Raveena Tandon	To support her daughter
Week 14	Day 98	Shreyas Iyer, Yuzvendra Chahal and Shashank Singh	For announcement of captain for their team Punjab Kings for the upcoming IPL season
Week 14	Day 98	Krushna Abhishek and Kashmera Shah	To promote their upcoming season of Laughter Chefs – Unlimited Entertainment
Week 15	Day 102	Omung Kumar	To deliver letters from their family members to the housemates and to conduct the final eviction from the house.
Week 15	Day 104	Vankush Arora	To help the housemates for Maha Roast
Week 15	Day 104	Elvish Yadav, Vicky Jain, Rudraksh Singh Chauhan, Sandiip Sikcand, Barkha Bisht, Shilpa Shinde, Snehiil Dixit Mehraa and Ved Raj	As a supporter of housemates to answer the questions by the media.
Week 15	Day 104	Krushna Abhishek and Sudesh Lehri	For Maha Roast
Grand Finale	Day 107	Veer Pahariya	To promote his movie Sky Force
Grand Finale	Day 107	Elvish Yadav, Vicky Jain, Abhishek Kumar, Mannara Chopra and Ankita Lokhande Jain	To promote their upcoming season of Laughter Chefs – Unlimited Entertainment
Grand Finale	Day 107	Priyanshi Yadav, Amar Upadhyay, Sreejita De, Mishkat Varma, Samiksha Jaiswal and Khushbu Rajendra Trivadi	To promote their TV shows Doree and Ram Bhavan respectively
Grand Finale	Day 107	Junaid Khan and Khushi Kapoor	To promote their movie Loveyapa
Grand Finale	Day 107	Aamir Khan	To support his son

== Reception ==
The series grand premiere episode was reviewed by NDTV. The grand finale of Bigg Boss 18 achieved a TRP of 3.1, marking one of the highest ratings for the show in recent years, only surpassed by Bigg Boss 13.
