= Aniruddhacharya =

Indian Hindu spiritual leader and religious storyteller (born 1989)

Personal life
- Born: Anil Ram Tiwari; 27 September 1989 (age 37) Jabalpur, Madhya Pradesh, India
- Spouse: Arti Tiwari
- Other names: Krishna Baba, Das Aniruddh
- Occupation: Spiritual teacher, religious storyteller
- Website: aniruddhacharya.com

Religious life
- Religion: Hinduism

Religious career
- Post: Founder, Gauri Gopal Ashram, Vrindavan

Aniruddhacharya (born Anil Ram Tiwari, 27 September 1989), is an Indian Hindu religious orator and self-styled guru. Alongside delivering spiritual discourses, Aniruddhacharya is actively involved in social service initiatives. Sometimes his remarks have caused controversies. He has established the "Gauri Gopal Vriddh Ashram" in Vrindavan, which currently houses over 300 elderly women.

== Early life and family ==
Aniruddhacharya was born on 27 September 1989 in Jabalpur, Madhya Pradesh. His father was a local Hindu priest.

He studied Hindu scriptures including the Bhagavad Gita and the Ramayana, which later informed his religious discourses. He is married to Arti Tiwari and has two sons. His extended family is his brother and his brother's son Shashwat Acharya who has recently joined Bhakti Katha

== Career ==
Aniruddhacharya delivers religious discourses across India, particularly focused on the Bhagavata Purana and related Hindu scriptures. He is associated with charitable and religious activities in Vrindavan, including the operation of a Gauri Gopal Ashram that supports community services such as cow protection, an old-age home, monkey welfare, and educational programs.

He runs a free community kitchen where thousands of devotees are served meals (*Prasadam*) daily.

Several Bollywood celebrities visited his Vridh ashram in Vrindavan.

He received an "Honorary *Doctorate degree* in Humanity and Spiritual Education" from Institutions in the USA & South Africa. Additionally, he was honoured by the "World Book of Records, London" in 2023.

He received his spiritual teachings (Diksha) from Saint Shree Giriraj Shastri Maharaj and belongs to the shri Ramanuja Sampradaya.

His official Youtube channel 'Aniruddhacharya ji' achieved a milestone of over 10 million subscribers.

== Media appearances ==
- He appeared as a guest on the reality television show Laughter Chefs – Unlimited Entertainment in 2024.
- He claimed to decline an offer to participate in Bigg Boss 18, citing that the format did not align with his personal values. But later appeared as a guest during the premiere episode of the show, where he presented a copy of the Bhagavad Gita to host Salman Khan.

== Public image and controversies ==
Aniruddhacharya has faced public criticism for controversial remarks.

=== Remarks on women and marriage age (2025) ===
In July 2025, Aniruddhacharya faced criticism after a video of his remarks at the Gauri Gopal Ashram in Vrindavan circulated on social media. In the clip, he commented on women marrying at or after the age of 25, implying that some may have been involved in multiple relationships. The remarks were widely condemned as sexist, prompting criticism from women’s rights groups, lawyers, and public figures.

A clip from the same July 2025 discourse showed him saying that girls in the past were married at 14 and settled easily into families, while women marrying at 25 had, in many cases, already had several relationships. Women advocates of the Mathura Bar Association submitted a complaint to the district police chief, and the Uttar Pradesh State Women's Commission said it had taken cognizance. In a separate clip from a sermon in Vrindavan, he criticised women in live-in relationships, drawing further backlash. He later said the media had shown only part of his statement, which he said applied to both boys and girls. Protests continued, including in Varanasi in September 2025.

In July 2025, he issued an apology following backlash over his remark that "unmarried women have loose character."

In December 2025, after police did not act on her complaint, Meera Rathore, Agra district president of the All India Hindu Mahasabha, filed a private complaint over the remarks. The Chief Judicial Magistrate's court in Mathura accepted it and set 1 January 2026 to record her statement.

=== Remark on Lord Shiva (2024) ===
In September 2024, he issued an apology following backlash over a statement involving Lord Shiva.

=== Remarks on clothing and sexual violence (2024) ===
He has also been criticised for comments regarding clothing and sexual violence.

=== Internet memes ===
He has also been the subject of internet memes, particularly for his remarks on topics such as food and daily habits.

=== Remarks on Sita and Draupadi (2022) ===
In 2022, he drew widespread criticism after making controversial remarks about women during a religious discourse. He claimed that excessive beauty in women is a fault, suggesting that figures from Hindu mythology like Sita and Draupadi suffered because they were "more beautiful than necessary." The comments were widely condemned as misogynistic and blamed for promoting a victim-blaming mindset. Public figures and social media users criticised the statement, and an FIR was filed in Mathura for allegedly insulting revered female figures of Hinduism.

=== Police cases ===
Year	Place	Type	Complainant	Allegation	Status
2022	Vrindavan police station, Mathura	FIR	Pawan Sharma (BJP member) and members of the Akhil Bharat Hindu Mahasabha	Hurting religious sentiments through remarks on Sita and Draupadi	Registered
2025	Chief Judicial Magistrate's court, Mathura	Private complaint (after police did not register an FIR)	Meera Rathore (All India Hindu Mahasabha, Agra)	Indecent and defamatory remarks about women	Court admitted the complaint; hearing set for 1 January 2026
