= Baatein Kuch Ankahee Si =

Indian drama television series

- Genre: Drama; Family drama Romance
- Created by: Rajan Shahi
- Developed by: Zama Habib
- Starring: Sayali Salunkhe; Mohit Malik
- Opening theme: Baatein Kuch Ankahee Si by Sanam Puri and Usha Uthup
- Country of origin: India
- Original language: Hindi
- No. of seasons: 1
- No. of episodes: 200

Production
- Producer: Rajan Shahi
- Editor: Sameer Gandhi
- Camera setup: Multi-camera
- Running time: 20–24 minutes
- Production company: Director's Kut Productions

Original release
- Network: StarPlus
- Release: 21 August 2023 – 11 March 2024

Baatein Kuch Ankahee Si (transl. Some Unspoken Conversations) is an Indian Hindi-language drama television series that aired from 21 August 2023 to 11 March 2024 on StarPlus. It streamed digitally on Disney+ Hotstar. Produced by Rajan Shahi under Director's Kut Productions, it is a remake of Star Jalsha's Bengali series Irabotir Chupkotha. It starred Sayali Salunkhe and Mohit Malik.

== Plot ==
Aspiring singer, Vandana Karmarkar lives with her father Vijay, aunt, younger sister, Mrunal, older brother, Hemant, his wife Anagha and their son, Shivam. She has been in a relationship with Vaibhav for about five years and is now about to marry him. She wishes to be a playback artist and auditions for a job. Kunal Malhotra hates India and is forced to go back to find the next great artist in Mumbai. He hears Vandana's voice and hates it and tells her that she will never be able to become a playback singer. Disheartened, she challenges him and vows to become the best. Kunal's aunt, Pammi, wants to live with him along with her son, Bobby, a viral social media influencer who is kind-hearted, and her husband and they move in next door to Vandana's house. Vandana is assaulted by a future employer and runs out of the room crying. Kunal sees her crying as he has a meeting with the employer for him to invest in this music label. He asks the man why Vandana was crying and he says that Vandana forced herself onto him. Kunal, knowing that Vandana's most important quality is her dignity and self-respect, beats up the man and cancels the deal. He leaves and finds Vandana, who falls unconscious. He carries her to her house and at the house are Vaibhav and his family. Vaibhav gets mad at Kunal and Kunal reveals that he saw Vaibhav at a cafe with another woman, which goes unnoticed by everyone else.

Vandana and her family get invited to a party hosted by the Malhotras while Kunal's father, Kuldeep, doesn't like the Karmarkars. He and Pammi decide to get rid of Vandana and her family. Pammi insults Vandana's aunt and Vandana grabs Kuldeep by the collar. Kunal sees this and fights with Vandana. He decides to get revenge and so he buys their house and kicks them out. He agrees to let her family stay there only if she becomes his assistant. Mrunal and Vaibhav start an affair. Kunal finds out and wants to tell Vandana but can't find any opportunities to. Anagha and Hemant find out but decide not to tell her as she is the lone supporter for her father not to sell the house. Hemant is in debt and if they can sell the house, they will have enough money to pay off the debt. Vandana's aunt finds out about Mrunal and Vaibhav's affair but doesn't tell her. Instead, she begs Vaibhav not to continue the affair. He promises her but continues to do so.

Kunal overhears Mrunal and Vaibhav talking about how they plan to get married the next day, the supposed day of Vandana and Vaibhav's wedding. Kunal brings Vandana to the temple where Mrunal and Vaibhav will marry but they're not there. Vaibhav and Vandana marry and Vandana asks Kunal not to get involved in her life. As a tradition, Vandana's family goes to Vaibhav's house. Vandana faints and it turns out she can't be a mother. She walks out of her house in a daze and meets Kunal and Bobby on the road. Kunal, Bobby, and Vandana go to work together and Vandana sees a little girl named Tara on the road. She is almost hit by a car but Kunal and Vandana save her. Tara is revealed to be Kunal's daughter meanwhile Tara and Vandana bond. Later that day, Soniya and Indraneel, Kunal's wife and his former best friend, show up and declare that Soniya wants a divorce from Kunal to marry Indraneel and wishes that Tara live with Kunal. Kunal refuses to accept Tara and Vandana takes care of her. Kunal can't bear to be a father and brings the child back to Soniya's house. Tara runs away from home and is kidnapped but Kunal and Vandana save her. Kunal decides that Soniya isn't responsible and decides to take care of Tara himself. Kunal accepts Tara and Soniya and Kunal gets a divorce.

Vandana learns of the affair and divorces Vaibhav and expels Mrunal from the house. Soniya accuses Kunal and Vandana of having an affair and blames it on Vaibhav and Mrunal. Kunal and Vandana get into a fight and he forbids her from meeting Tara. Later, Tara has an allergic reaction to peanut butter. Kunal is unable to take care of her as he intoxicated, but Vandana finds her and takes her to the hospital. Kunal realizes Vandana will be a good fit for Tara as a mother. Vandana and Kunal decide to get married. Vaibhav and Anagha attempt to kill Vijay to get the property. Vandana finds out and has the police arrest Vaibhav while Anagha does not get exposed. Vijay refuses to accept Kunal as his son-in-law and states that if Vandana were to marry him, he would disown her. Mrunal, mad about Vaibhav being in jail, makes a deal with Soniya. Soniya will pay Vaibhav's bail in exchange for Mrunal morphing nude photos of Vandana. Vandana is harassed in public but Kunal protects her and figures out Mrunal and Soniya leaked the fake photos. Indraneel decides to move to Dubai with Soniya. Kuldeep learns of Kunal's marriage and decides to stop it along with Pammi. He calls Kunal back to London for six months.

=== 6 months later ===
Kunal returns to India and marries Vandana. Soniya arrives and reveals that Indraneel hits her. Kunal lets Soniya stay at the Malhotra House, after it is revealed that Indraneel abuses her. She becomes jealous of Kunal and Vandana's budding relationship and takes Pammi's help with destroying their relationship. Tara has a panic attack at her birthday party and Kunal blames Vandana and calls her a bad mother. Vandana receives a call from the Karmarkar house and finds Mrunal trying to kill herself. Vandana tries to find out the reason but Mrunal confesses she’s pregnant. The next day, Vijay expels her out of the house. Vandana proves herself to be a good mother and Kunal apologizes.

Kunal and Vandana hit a woman with their car and it turns out to be Vani, Kunal's mother. Kunal's father, Kuldeep, had sent her to a mental asylum and told his children that Vani had left for good. Vani has lost her memory and is now staying at the Malhotra House. Considering his father to be a god, Kunal always listens to Kuldeep without ever doubting him, therefore hating his mother. Knowing her mother is innocent, Vedika, Kunal's sister stays at the Malhotra house to support Vani. Mrunal and Bobby elope and return married claiming to be in love, with Bobby having accepted Mrunal's unborn child. It is revealed that Mrunal plans on deceiving Bobby after getting money and jewellery and run away with Vaibhav. Gradually, Kunal and Vandana grow closer and fall in love and consummate their marriage. Mrunal has a miscarriage and blames Vandana, accusing her of being jealous because Vaibhav chose her and that she can never conceive, to which the Malhotras find shocking. Later, Vandana and Kunal separate due to differences created by Kuldeep, who constantly harasses Vani. To make ends meet, Vandana sings in bars and eventually finds out she is pregnant. She tells Kunal but doesn't reconcile with him. Mrunal steals money and valuables from the house but returns when she sees Vaibhav's true colours. Vani regains her memory and tries telling Kunal, but Kuldeep attacks her. They fight, but Tara is injured in the process and one of her organs collapse. Vandana donates hers but doesn't make through the surgery. She is later revived with Kunal's love and they reconcile. Kunal and the Malhotras leave the house after a confrontation with Kuldeep. They all move in with the Karmarkars and 3 months later, they all prepare for a festival and the show ends on a good note.

== Cast ==
=== Main ===
- Sayali Salunkhe as Vandana "Vandu" Karmarkar Malhotra: Vijay and Sumitra's elder daughter; Hemant's younger sister and Mrunal's elder sister; Vaibhav's ex–wife; Kunal's wife; Tara's stepmother (2023–2024)
- Mohit Malik as Kunal "Kukku" Malhotra: Kuldeep and Vani's son; Vedika's younger brother; Bobby's elder cousin; Sonia's ex–husband; Vandana's husband; Tara's father (2023–2024)

=== Recurring ===
- Karan Veer Mehra as Vaibhav Joshi: Vinayak and Sarita's son; Anjali's younger brother; Mrunal's ex–boyfriend; Vandana's ex–husband (2023–2024)
- Jazlyn Tanwani as Tara "Taru" Malhotra: Kunal and Sonia's daughter; Vandana's stepdaughter (2023–2024)
- Leena Jumani as Sonia: Kunal's ex-wife; Tara's mother; Indraneel's girlfriend (2023–2024)
- Yatin Karyekar as Vijay Karmarkar: Sumitra's widower; Hemant, Vandana and Mrunal's father; Shivam's grandfather (2023–2024)
- Kshitee Jog as Sumitra Karmarkar: Vijay's wife; Hemant, Vandana and Mrunal's mother; Shivam's grandmother (2023) (Dead)
- Vishal Nayak as Hemant Karmarkar: Vijay and Sumitra's son; Vandana and Mrunal's elder brother; Anagha's husband; Shivam's father (2023–2024)
- Garvita Sadhwani as Mrunal Karmarkar Sood: Vijay and Sumitra's younger daughter; Hemant and Vandana's younger sister; Vaibhav's ex–girlfriend; Bobby's wife (2023–2024)
- Abhidnya Bhave as Anagha Karmarkar: Hemant's wife; Shivam's mother (2023–2024)
- Arisht Jain as Shivam Karmarkar: Hemant and Anagha's son (2023–2024)
- Ujjwala Jog as Miss Karmarkar "Atya": Vijay's elder sister; Hemant, Vandana and Mrunal's paternal aunt (2023–2024)
- Amit Behl as Kuldeep Malhotra: Pammi's elder brother; Vani's husband; Vedika and Kunal's father; Parisa's maternal and Tara's paternal grandfather (2023–2024)
- Aishwarya Narkar / Chaitrali Gupte as Vani Malhotra: Kuldeep's wife; Vedika and Kunal's mother; Parisa's maternal and Tara's paternal grandmother (2023) / (2023–2024)
- Ankita Sharma as Vedika "Vedu" Malhotra: Kuldeep and Vani's daughter; Kunal's sister; Bobby's cousin; Parisa's mother (2023–2024)
- Ketaki Kulkarni as Parisa: Vedika's daughter (2023)
- Sheeba Akashdeep as Pammi Malhotra Sood: Kuldeep's younger sister; Guneet's wife; Bobby's mother (2023–2024)
- Romit Raj as Bobby Sood: Pammi and Guneet's son; Vedika and Kunal's younger cousin; Mrunal's husband (2023–2024)
- Digvijay Purohit as Guneet Sood: Pammi's husband; Bobby's father (2023–2024)
- Hitesh Sampat as Vinayak Joshi: Sarita's husband; Vaibhav and Anjali's father (2023)
- Sanyogeeta Bhave as Sarita Joshi: Vinayak's wife; Vaibhav and Anjali's mother (2023)
- Sushma Jaywant as Anjali Joshi: Sarita and Vinayak's daughter; Vaibhav's elder sister (2023)
- Aishwarya Aher as Sam (2023)
- Amit Pachori as Indranil Sarkar: A music director; Kunal's rival; Sonia's boyfriend (2023–2024)
- Keerti Choudhary as Simran "Simmi": Kunal's prospective bride (2023)

=== Guest appearances ===
- Rupali Ganguly as Anupama from Anupamaa (2023)
- Kanwar Dhillon as Sachin Deshmukh from Udne Ki Aasha (2024)

== Production ==
=== Casting ===
Initially Drashti Dhami and Sriti Jha were approached to play the female lead. Later, Mohit Malik as Kunal Malhotra and Sayli Salunkhe as Vandana Karmarkar were signed as the lead.

=== Development ===
The series title is inspired by the song Baatein Kuch Ankahein Si, from the 2007 Bollywood movie, Life in a... Metro. The series was announced on Star Plus by Director's Kut Productions. It is Director's Kut Productions first attempt at a mature love story. The series marks the second collaboration between Rajan Shahi and Malik after Miilee (2005). The launch event for the series was held on 19 August 2023. A launch party was held on 21 August 2023.

=== Release ===
Initially scheduled to premiere on 8 August 2023, it was postponed for two weeks. The cast of the show sought blessings at the Siddhivinayak Temple ahead of the launch on 21 August 2023. Salunkhe also went on to make special appearances in Yeh Rishta Kya Kehlata Hai, Anupamaa, Ghum Hai Kisikey Pyaar Meiin, Imlie, Pandya Store and Teri Meri Doriyaann to promote the show.

=== Cancellation ===
Baatein Kuch Ankahee Si aired its last episode on 11 March 2024. The cast and crew wrapped up their final shoot on 4 March 2024. The cast got emotional in their last shoot days.

== Soundtrack ==
The title track has been sung by Usha Uthup and Sanam. The musical event for the launch of title track was attended by the cast of Anupamaa and Yeh Rishta Kya Kehlata Hai.

Baatein Kuch Ankahee Si

Soundtrack album by Usha Uthup Sanam
- Released: 2023
- Genre: Soundtrack
- Length: 2:45
- Language: Hindi
- Label: StarPlus

Music video
- "Baatein Kuch Ankahee Si Ft. Sanam and Usha Uthup" on YouTube

Tracklisting
No.	Title	Singer(s)	Length
1.	"Baatein Kuch Ankahee Si" (Duet)	Usha Uthup and Sanam	2:45
Total length:			2:45
