= Pradeep Yadav =

Pradeep Yadav may refer to:

- Pradeep Yadav (Nepalese politician)
- Pradeep Yadav (Indian politician)
- Pradeep Yadav (cricketer), Indian sports person
- Pradeep Yadav (director), Indian television director
