= List of Kullfi Kumarr Bajewala episodes =

Kullfi Kumarr Bajewala is an Indian musical television series created and directed by Gul Khan and Nilanjana Purkasthya. It is a remake version of Potol Kumar Gaanwala. The story of this show follows the journey of a young singing prodigy Kullfi, who sets out to find her father, Sikandar Singh Gill.

The series premiered on 19 March 2018, on StarPlus. The first season is started from premiered day and still running on StarPlus. On 3 August 2018, the show has completed 100 episodes and achieving their first goal.

== Series overview ==
Series	Episodes	Originally released	
Series	Episodes	First released	Last released
1	494	19 March 2018	7 February 2020

== Episodes ==
=== Season 1 ===
No. overall	No. in season	Title	Directed by	Written by	Original release date
1	1	"Miliye Pyari Kullfi Se"	Pradeep Yadav	Sahana Bajpaie; Faizal Aziz	19 March 2018
2	2	"Kullfi Sings a Devotional Song"	Pradeep Yadav	Sahana Bajpaie; Faizal Aziz	20 March 2018
3	3	"Kullfi Is Honoured"	Pradeep Yadav	Sahana Bajpaie; Faizal Aziz	21 March 2018
4	4	"Nimrat Stops Kullfi"	Pradeep Yadav	Sahana Bajpaie; Faizal Aziz	22 March 2018
5	5	"Nihalo's Clever Move"	Pradeep Yadav	Sahana Bajpaie; Faizal Aziz	23 March 2018
6	6	"Nihalo Learns the Truth"	Pradeep Yadav	Sahana Bajpaie; Faizal Aziz	26 March 2018
7	7	"Kullfi Defies Nimrat"	Pradeep Yadav	Sahana Bajpaie; Faizal Aziz	27 March 2018
8	8	"Sikander Faces Loveleen's Ire"	Pradeep Yadav	Sahana Bajpaie; Faizal Aziz	28 March 2018
9	9	"Nimrat Shares Her Past"	Pradeep Yadav	Sahana Bajpaie; Faizal Aziz	29 March 2018
10	10	"Danger Looms Over Kullfi"	Pradeep Yadav	Sahana Bajpaie; Faizal Aziz	30 March 2018
11	11	"Nimrat Falls Unconscious!"	Pradeep Yadav	Sahana Bajpaie; Faizal Aziz	2 April 2018
12	12	"Kullfi Pleads with Nihalo"	Pradeep Yadav	Sahana Bajpaie; Faizal Aziz	3 April 2018
13	13	"Nihalo Misleads Sikander"	Pradeep Yadav	Sahana Bajpaie; Faizal Aziz	4 April 2018
14	14	"Kullfi Wants to Meet Sikander"	Pradeep Yadav	Sahana Bajpaie; Faizal Aziz	5 April 2018
15	15	"Sikander Entertains the Crowd"	Pradeep Yadav	Sahana Bajpaie; Faizal Aziz	6 April 2018
16	16	"Kullfi Worships Goddess Durga"	Pradeep Yadav	Sahana Bajpaie; Faizal Aziz	9 April 2018
17	17	"Nimrat Meets with an Accident"	Pradeep Yadav	Sahana Bajpaie; Faizal Aziz	10 April 2018
18	18	"Kullfi Loses Nimrat"	Pradeep Yadav	Sahana Bajpaie; Faizal Aziz	11 April 2018
19	19	"Kullfi Is Dejected"	Pradeep Yadav	Sahana Bajpaie; Faizal Aziz	12 April 2018
20	20	"Loveleen Confronts Sikander"	Pradeep Yadav	Sahana Bajpaie; Faizal Aziz	13 April 2018
21	21	"Nihalo's Cunning Act"	Pradeep Yadav	Sahana Bajpaie; Faizal Aziz	16 April 2018
22	22	"Nihalo Hits a New Low"	Pradeep Yadav	Sahana Bajpaie; Faizal Aziz	17 April 2018
23	23	"Sikander Sings for Amyra"	Pradeep Yadav	Sahana Bajpaie; Faizal Aziz	18 April 2018
21	21	"Sittu, Kullfi on the Run!"	Pradeep Yadav	Sahana Bajpaie; Faizal Aziz	19 April 2018
25	25	"Will Sittu Rescue Kullfi?"	Pradeep Yadav	Sahana Bajpaie; Faizal Aziz	20 April 2018
26	26	"Kullfi in Disguise"	Pradeep Yadav	Sahana Bajpaie; Faizal Aziz	23 April 2018
27	27	"Kullfi to Go to Mumbai"	Pradeep Yadav	Sahana Bajpaie; Faizal Aziz	24 April 2018
28	28	"Kullfi in Deep Trouble"	Pradeep Yadav	Sahana Bajpaie; Faizal Aziz	25 April 2018
29	29	"Kullfi Makes Friends in Mumbai"	Pradeep Yadav	Sahana Bajpaie; Faizal Aziz	26 April 2018
30	30	"Kullfi, Sikander Pray Fervently"	Pradeep Yadav	Sahana Bajpaie; Faizal Aziz	27 April 2018
31	31	"Kullfi Strives to Meet Sikander"	Pradeep Yadav	Sahana Bajpaie; Faizal Aziz	30 April 2018
32	32	"Kullfi at Sikander's Residence"	Pradeep Yadav	Sahana Bajpaie; Faizal Aziz	1 May 2018
33	33	"Sikander Lashes Out at Kullfi"	Pradeep Yadav	Sahana Bajpaie; Faizal Aziz	2 May 2018
34	34	"Amyra Apologises to Kullfi"	Pradeep Yadav	Sahana Bajpaie; Faizal Aziz	3 May 2018
35	35	"Amyra Plots Against Kullfi"	Pradeep Yadav	Sahana Bajpaie; Faizal Aziz	4 May 2018
36	36	"Sikander Seeks Loveleen's Help"	Pradeep Yadav	Sahana Bajpaie; Faizal Aziz	7 May 2018
37	37	"Loveleen Ousts Kullfi"	Pradeep Yadav	Sahana Bajpaie; Faizal Aziz	8 May 2018
38	38	"Kullfi Sings Out for"	Pradeep Yadav	Sahana Bajpaie; Faizal Aziz	9 May 2018
39	39	"Loveleen Searches for Kullfi"	Pradeep Yadav	Sahana Bajpaie; Faizal Aziz	10 May 2018
40	40	"Loveleen Pampers Kullfi"	Pradeep Yadav	Sahana Bajpaie; Faizal Aziz	11 May 2018
41	41	"Loveleen Deceives Kullfi"	Pradeep Yadav	Sahana Bajpaie; Faizal Aziz	14 May 2018
42	42	"Loveleen Tries to Persuade Amyra"	Pradeep Yadav	Sahana Bajpaie; Faizal Aziz	15 May 2018
43	43	"Kullfi to Upset Loveleen's Plan?"	Pradeep Yadav	Sahana Bajpaie; Faizal Aziz	16 May 2018
44	44	"Amyra to Impress Roshan"	Pradeep Yadav	Sahana Bajpaie; Faizal Aziz	17 May 2018
45	45	"Sikander Cheers up Kullfi"	Pradeep Yadav	Sahana Bajpaie; Faizal Aziz	18 May 2018
46	46	"Loveleen Hides Nimrat's Souvenirs"	Pradeep Yadav	Sahana Bajpaie; Faizal Aziz	21 May 2018
47	47	"Amyra Misleads Kullfi"	Pradeep Yadav	Sahana Bajpaie; Faizal Aziz	22 May 2018
48	48	"Sikander Learns the Bitter Truth"	Pradeep Yadav	Sahana Bajpaie; Faizal Aziz	23 May 2018
49	49	"Amyra's Sinister Plan"	Pradeep Yadav	Sahana Bajpaie; Faizal Aziz	24 May 2018
50	50	"Kullfi Is in Trouble"	Pradeep Yadav	Sahana Bajpaie; Faizal Aziz	25 May 2018
51	51	"What is Loveleen Hiding?"	Pradeep Yadav	Sahana Bajpaie; Faizal Aziz	28 May 2018
52	52	"Will Kullfi Find Her Father?"	Pradeep Yadav	Sahana Bajpaie; Faizal Aziz	29 May 2018
53	53	"Amyra Lip Syncs on Stage"	Pradeep Yadav	Sahana Bajpaie; Faizal Aziz	30 May 2018
54	54	"Sikander Confronts Loveleen"	Pradeep Yadav	Sahana Bajpaie; Faizal Aziz	31 May 2018
55	55	"Kullfi Takes Care of Sikander"	Pradeep Yadav	Sahana Bajpaie; Faizal Aziz	1 June 2018
56	56	"Sikander Advises Amyra"	Pradeep Yadav	Sahana Bajpaie; Faizal Aziz	4 June 2018
57	57	"Sikander Berates Kullfi"	Pradeep Yadav	Sahana Bajpaie; Faizal Aziz	5 June 2018
58	58	"A Blow for Loveleen"	Pradeep Yadav	Sahana Bajpaie; Faizal Aziz	6 June 2018
59	59	"A Shock for Sikander"	Pradeep Yadav	Sahana Bajpaie; Faizal Aziz	7 June 2018
60	60	"Mahinder to Visit Chiroli"	Pradeep Yadav	Sahana Bajpaie; Faizal Aziz	8 June 2018
61	61	"Mahinder Meets Nihalo"	Pradeep Yadav	Sahana Bajpaie; Faizal Aziz	11 June 2018
62	62	"Kullfi Does the Unthinkable"	Pradeep Yadav	Sahana Bajpaie; Faizal Aziz	12 June 2018
63	63	"Kullfi, Amyra and Sikander Sing"	Pradeep Yadav	Sahana Bajpaie; Faizal Aziz	13 June 2018
64	64	"Sikander Searches for Kullfi"	Pradeep Yadav	Sahana Bajpaie; Faizal Aziz	14 June 2018
65	65	"Sikander's Eid Party"	Pradeep Yadav	Sahana Bajpaie; Faizal Aziz	15 June 2018
66	66	"Mahinder Gets a Clue"	Pradeep Yadav	Sahana Bajpaie; Faizal Aziz	18 June 2018
67	67	"Kullfi Plays the Piano"	Pradeep Yadav	Sahana Bajpaie; Faizal Aziz	19 June 2018
68	68	"Kullfi to Make a Confession"	Pradeep Yadav	Sahana Bajpaie; Faizal Aziz	20 June 2018
69	69	"Mahinder Learns the Truth"	Pradeep Yadav	Sahana Bajpaie; Faizal Aziz	21 June 2018
70	70	"Danger Looms over Kullfi"	Pradeep Yadav	Sahana Bajpaie; Faizal Aziz	22 June 2018
71	71	"Mahinder Lies to Sikander"	Pradeep Yadav	Sahana Bajpaie; Faizal Aziz	25 June 2018
72	72	"Amyra Is Angry with Sikander"	Pradeep Yadav	Sahana Bajpaie; Faizal Aziz	26 June 2018
73	73	"Sikander to Reveal the Truth"	Pradeep Yadav	Sahana Bajpaie; Faizal Aziz	27 June 2018
74	74	"Sikander wants Kullfi to Sing"	Pradeep Yadav	Sahana Bajpaie; Faizal Aziz	28 June 2018
75	75	"Sikander wants Guru Dakshina"	Pradeep Yadav	Sahana Bajpaie; Faizal Aziz	29 June 2018
76	76	"Kullfi Is in a Fix"	Pradeep Yadav	Sahana Bajpaie; Faizal Aziz	2 July 2018
77	77	"Loveleen Traps Kullfi"	Pradeep Yadav	Sahana Bajpaie; Faizal Aziz	3 July 2018
78	78	"Kullfi Saves Sikander's Mother!"	Pradeep Yadav	Sahana Bajpaie; Faizal Aziz	4 July 2018
79	79	"Amyra Thanks Kullfi!"	Pradeep Yadav	Sahana Bajpaie; Faizal Aziz	5 July 2018
80	80	"Sikander Has a Competitor"	Pradeep Yadav	Sahana Bajpaie; Faizal Aziz	6 July 2018
81	81	"Tevar Surprises Sikander"	Pradeep Yadav	Sahana Bajpaie; Faizal Aziz	9 July 2018
82	82	"Loveleen Motivates Sikander"	Pradeep Yadav	Sahana Bajpaie; Faizal Aziz	10 July 2018
83	83	"Sikander Pampers Kullfi"	Pradeep Yadav	Sahana Bajpaie; Faizal Aziz	11 July 2018
84	84	"Kullfi's Unfulfilled Wish"	Pradeep Yadav	Sahana Bajpaie; Faizal Aziz	12 July 2018
85	85	"Kullfi Falls Sick"	Pradeep Yadav	Sahana Bajpaie; Faizal Aziz	13 July 2018
86	86	"Loveleen's Birthday Celebration"	Pradeep Yadav	Sahana Bajpaie; Faizal Aziz	16 July 2018
87	87	"Tevar Confronts Loveleen"	Pradeep Yadav	Sahana Bajpaie; Faizal Aziz	17 July 2018
88	88	"Loveleen's Birthday Party"	Pradeep Yadav	Sahana Bajpaie; Faizal Aziz	18 July 2018
89	89	"Loveleen, Tevar Recall Their Past"	Pradeep Yadav	Sahana Bajpaie; Faizal Aziz	19 July 2018
90	90	"Loveleen's Dark Secret"	Pradeep Yadav	Sahana Bajpaie; Faizal Aziz	20 July 2018
91	91	"Will Amyra's Plan Work?"	Pradeep Yadav	Sahana Bajpaie; Faizal Aziz	23 July 2018
92	92	"Kullfi to Go with Her Father!"	Pradeep Yadav	Sahana Bajpaie; Faizal Aziz	24 July 2018
93	93	"Sikander Worries about Kullfi"	Pradeep Yadav	Sahana Bajpaie; Faizal Aziz	25 July 2018
94	94	"What Is David up to?"	Pradeep Yadav	Sahana Bajpaie; Faizal Aziz	26 July 2018
95	95	"David Disappoints Kullfi"	Pradeep Yadav	Sahana Bajpaie; Faizal Aziz	27 July 2018
96	96	"Loveleen, Tevar Get Exposed?"	Pradeep Yadav	Sahana Bajpaie; Faizal Aziz	30 July 2018
97	97	"Sikander Threatens David"	Pradeep Yadav	Sahana Bajpaie; Faizal Aziz	31 July 2018
98	98	"A Setback for Sikander"	Pradeep Yadav	Sahana Bajpaie; Faizal Aziz	1 August 2018
99	99	"Sikander Spies on David"	Pradeep Yadav	Sahana Bajpaie; Faizal Aziz	2 August 2018
100	100	"Will Sikander Find Kullfi?"	Pradeep Yadav	Sahana Bajpaie; Faizal Aziz	3 August 2018
101	101	"David Releases Kullfi"	Pradeep Yadav	Sahana Bajpaie; Faizal Aziz	6 August 2018
102	102	"Sikander Begs for Help!"	Pradeep Yadav	Sahana Bajpaie; Faizal Aziz	7 August 2018
103	103	"Nimrat Motivates Kullfi"	Pradeep Yadav	Sahana Bajpaie; Faizal Aziz	8 August 2018
104	104	"Sikander Heaves a Sigh of Relief"	Pradeep Yadav	Sahana Bajpaie; Faizal Aziz	9 August 2018
105	105	"Kullfi Gives Her Reasons"	Pradeep Yadav	Sahana Bajpaie; Faizal Aziz	10 August 2018
106	106	"Loveleen Learns the Truth"	Pradeep Yadav	Sahana Bajpaie; Faizal Aziz	13 August 2018
107	107	"Loveleen's Unexpected Move"	Pradeep Yadav	Sahana Bajpaie; Faizal Aziz	14 August 2018
108	108	"Kullfi Wants to Mend Fences"	Pradeep Yadav	Sahana Bajpaie; Faizal Aziz	15 August 2018
109	109	"Sikander to Visit Chiroli"	Pradeep Yadav	Sahana Bajpaie; Faizal Aziz	16 August 2018
110	110	"Kullfi to Convince Sikander"	Pradeep Yadav	Sahana Bajpaie; Faizal Aziz	17 August 2018
111	111	"Sikander Changes His Mind"	Pradeep Yadav	Sahana Bajpaie; Faizal Aziz	20 August 2018
112	112	"Loveleen's Pack of Lies"	Pradeep Yadav	Sahana Bajpaie; Faizal Aziz	21 August 2018
113	113	"Sikander in a Tough Spot"	Pradeep Yadav	Sahana Bajpaie; Faizal Aziz	22 August 2018
114	114	"Sunidhi, Nakash at Jashn-E-Hindustan"	Pradeep Yadav	Sahana Bajpaie; Faizal Aziz	23 August 2018
115	115	"Sukhwinder, Sunidhi Enthrall All"	Pradeep Yadav	Sahana Bajpaie; Faizal Aziz	24 August 2018
116	116	"Sikander, Kullfi Sing a Song"	Pradeep Yadav	Sahana Bajpaie; Faizal Aziz	27 August 2018
117	117	"Can Tevar Convince Kullfi?"	Pradeep Yadav	Sahana Bajpaie; Faizal Aziz	28 August 2018
118	118	"Tevar Wants Kullfi"	Pradeep Yadav	Sahana Bajpaie; Faizal Aziz	29 August 2018
119	119	"Sikander Reads Nimrat's Diary!"	Pradeep Yadav	Sahana Bajpaie; Faizal Aziz	30 August 2018
120	120	"Kullfi Goes With Tevar"	Pradeep Yadav	Sahana Bajpaie; Faizal Aziz	31 August 2018
121	121	"Kullfi Gets a Royal Treatment"	Pradeep Yadav	Sahana Bajpaie; Faizal Aziz	3 September 2018
122	122	"Tevar to Win for Kullfi"	Pradeep Yadav	Sahana Bajpaie; Faizal Aziz	4 September 2018
123	123	"Sikander Competes Against Tevar"	Pradeep Yadav	Sahana Bajpaie; Faizal Aziz	5 September 2018
124	124	"Loveleen's Shocking Move!"	Pradeep Yadav	Sahana Bajpaie; Faizal Aziz	6 September 2018
125	125	"Mahinder to Reveal the Truth!"	Pradeep Yadav	Sahana Bajpaie; Faizal Aziz	7 September 2018
126	126	"Tevar Tends to Kullfi"	Pradeep Yadav	Sahana Bajpaie; Faizal Aziz	10 September 2018
127	127	"Will Sikander Help Tevar?"	Pradeep Yadav	Sahana Bajpaie; Faizal Aziz	11 September 2018
128	128	"Tevar Plans a Surprise"	Pradeep Yadav	Sahana Bajpaie; Faizal Aziz	12 September 2018
129	129	"Sikander Befriends Tevar"	Pradeep Yadav	Sahana Bajpaie; Faizal Aziz	13 September 2018
130	130	"Sikander Smells Foul Play"	Pradeep Yadav	Sahana Bajpaie; Faizal Aziz	14 September 2018
131	131	"Tevar to Make a Confession"	Pradeep Yadav	Sahana Bajpaie; Faizal Aziz	17 September 2018
132	132	"Kullfi Learns English"	Pradeep Yadav	Sahana Bajpaie; Faizal Aziz	18 September 2018
133	133	"Kullfi Wins the Competition"	Pradeep Yadav	Sahana Bajpaie; Faizal Aziz	19 September 2018
134	134	"Loveleen in a Tight Spot"	Pradeep Yadav	Sahana Bajpaie; Faizal Aziz	20 September 2018
135	135	"Sikander Finds a Clue?"	Pradeep Yadav	Sahana Bajpaie; Faizal Aziz	21 September 2018
136	136	"Amyra, Kullfi Team Up!"	Pradeep Yadav	Sahana Bajpaie; Faizal Aziz	24 September 2018
137	137	"Tevar Is on Cloud Nine"	Pradeep Yadav	Sahana Bajpaie; Faizal Aziz	25 September 2018
138	138	"Sikander Calls Tevar's Girlfrien6"	Pradeep Yadav	Sahana Bajpaie; Faizal Aziz	26 September 2018
139	139	"Kullfi, Amyra's Fun Time Together"	Pradeep Yadav	Sahana Bajpaie; Faizal Aziz	27 September 2018
140	140	"A Rude Shock Awaits Sikander"	Pradeep Yadav	Sahana Bajpaie; Faizal Aziz	28 September 2018
141	141	"Loveleen Admits the Truth"	Pradeep Yadav	Sahana Bajpaie; Faizal Aziz	1 October 2018
142	142	"Reality Strikes Sikander"	Pradeep Yadav	Sahana Bajpaie; Faizal Aziz	2 October 2018
143	143	"Loveleen Faces Sikander's Wrath"	Pradeep Yadav	Sahana Bajpaie; Faizal Aziz	3 October 2018
144	144	"Sikander Meets Sittu"	Pradeep Yadav	Sahana Bajpaie; Faizal Aziz	4 October 2018
145	145	"Nihalo at Cutie's house"	Pradeep Yadav	Sahana Bajpaie; Faizal Aziz	5 October 2018
146	146	"Sikander Begs Sittu"	Pradeep Yadav	Sahana Bajpaie; Faizal Aziz	8 October 2018
147	147	"Sikander Is Disturbed"	Pradeep Yadav	Sahana Bajpaie; Faizal Aziz	9 October 2018
148	148	"Sikander to Reveal the Truth"	Pradeep Yadav	Sahana Bajpaie; Faizal Aziz	10 October 2018
149	149	"Sikander's Important Decision"	Pradeep Yadav	Sahana Bajpaie; Faizal Aziz	11 October 2018
150	150	"Kullfi Has a Jolly Good Time"	Pradeep Yadav	Sahana Bajpaie; Faizal Aziz	12 October 2018
151	151	"Amyra, Kullfi Go on a Picnic"	Pradeep Yadav	Sahana Bajpaie; Faizal Aziz	15 October 2018
152	152	"Loveleen Is Mighty Upset"	Pradeep Yadav	Sahana Bajpaie; Faizal Aziz	16 October 2018
153	153	"Shocking Revelation for Kullfi"	Pradeep Yadav	Sahana Bajpaie; Faizal Aziz	17 October 2018
154	154	"Kullfi Is Upset with Sikander"	Pradeep Yadav	Sahana Bajpaie; Faizal Aziz	18 October 2018
155	155	"Sikander's White Lie"	Pradeep Yadav	Sahana Bajpaie; Faizal Aziz	19 October 2018
156	156	"Kullfi's Interview at School"	Pradeep Yadav	Sahana Bajpaie; Faizal Aziz	22 October 2018
157	157	"Kullfi Wants Tevar to Teach Her"	Pradeep Yadav	Sahana Bajpaie; Faizal Aziz	23 October 2018
158	158	"Kullfi Is Distressed"	Pradeep Yadav	Sahana Bajpaie; Faizal Aziz	24 October 2018
159	159	"Sikandar help Kullfi prepare for her test"	Pradeep Yadav	Sahana Bajpaie; Faizal Aziz	25 October 2018
160	160	"Amyra Surprises Kullfi!"	Pradeep Yadav	Sahana Bajpaie; Faizal Aziz	26 October 2018
161	161	"Loveleen Blackmails Gunjan"	Pradeep Yadav	Sahana Bajpaie; Faizal Aziz	29 October 2018
162	162	"Loveleen's Plan Bears Fruit"	Pradeep Yadav	Sahana Bajpaie; Faizal Aziz	30 October 2018
163	163	"Amyra Is against Kullfi"	Pradeep Yadav	Sahana Bajpaie; Faizal Aziz	31 October 2018
164	164	"Things Are Not in Kullfi's Favour"	Pradeep Yadav	Sahana Bajpaie; Faizal Aziz	1 November 2018
165	165	"Kullfi to Convince the Principal"	Pradeep Yadav	Sahana Bajpaie; Faizal Aziz	2 November 2018
166	166	"Kullfi Visits Chiroli"	Pradeep Yadav	Sahana Bajpaie; Faizal Aziz	5 November 2018
167	167	"Disappointment Strikes Kullfi"	Pradeep Yadav	Sahana Bajpaie; Faizal Aziz	6 November 2018
168	168	"Loveleen Manipulates Kullfi"	Pradeep Yadav	Sahana Bajpaie; Faizal Aziz	7 November 2018
169	169	"Tevar Dotes on Kullfi"	Pradeep Yadav	Sahana Bajpaie; Faizal Aziz	8 November 2018
170	170	"Amyra, Kullfi Celebrate Diwali"	Pradeep Yadav	Sahana Bajpaie; Faizal Aziz	9 November 2018
171	171	"Sikander Solves Kullfi's Problem"	Pradeep Yadav	Sahana Bajpaie; Faizal Aziz	12 November 2018
172	172	"More Trouble for Kullfi"	Pradeep Yadav	Sahana Bajpaie; Faizal Aziz	13 November 2018
173	173	"Kullfi in Trouble"	Pradeep Yadav	Sahana Bajpaie; Faizal Aziz	14 November 2018
174	174	"Tevar Seeks Chaddha's Help"	Pradeep Yadav	Sahana Bajpaie; Faizal Aziz	15 November 2018
175	175	"Amyra Insults Sikander"	Pradeep Yadav	Sahana Bajpaie; Faizal Aziz	16 November 2018
176	176	"Amyra Feels Jealous"	Pradeep Yadav	Sahana Bajpaie; Faizal Aziz	19 November 2018
177	177	"Kullfi Clears the Test"	Pradeep Yadav	Sahana Bajpaie; Faizal Aziz	20 November 2018
178	178	"Tevar and Kullfi Are Homeless"	Pradeep Yadav	Sahana Bajpaie; Faizal Aziz	21 November 2018
179	179	"Kullfi Comforts Tevar"	Pradeep Yadav	Sahana Bajpaie; Faizal Aziz	22 November 2018
180	180	"Sikander Reveals the Truth"	Pradeep Yadav	Sahana Bajpaie; Faizal Aziz	23 November 2018
181	181	"Tevar Complains to Kullfi"	Pradeep Yadav	Sahana Bajpaie; Faizal Aziz	26 November 2018
182	182	"Kullfi Challenges Tevar"	Pradeep Yadav	Sahana Bajpaie; Faizal Aziz	27 November 2018
183	183	"Kullfi's Musical Solution"	Pradeep Yadav	Sahana Bajpaie; Faizal Aziz	28 November 2018
184	184	"Kullfi's Life in Danger"	Pradeep Yadav	Sahana Bajpaie; Faizal Aziz	29 November 2018
185	185	"Kullfi Defies Death Again!"	Pradeep Yadav	Sahana Bajpaie; Faizal Aziz	30 November 2018
186	186	"Reality to Strike Tevar!"	Pradeep Yadav	Sahana Bajpaie; Faizal Aziz	3 December 2018
187	187	"Tevar Learns the Truth"	Pradeep Yadav	Sahana Bajpaie; Faizal Aziz	4 December 2018
188	188	"Kullfi Learns about Her Father"	Pradeep Yadav	Sahana Bajpaie; Faizal Aziz	5 December 2018
189	189	"Kullfi Seeks Answers from Sittu"	Pradeep Yadav	Sahana Bajpaie; Faizal Aziz	6 December 2018
190	190	"Kullfi to Make a Choice"	Pradeep Yadav	Sahana Bajpaie; Faizal Aziz	7 December 2018
191	191	"Sikander Learns the Bitter Truth (Special Episode)"	Pradeep Yadav	Sahana Bajpaie; Faizal Aziz	8 December 2018
192	192	"Sikander-Loveleen's Ugly Fight"	Pradeep Yadav	Sahana Bajpaie; Faizal Aziz	10 December 2018
193	193	"Gunjan Reveals It All?"	Pradeep Yadav	Sahana Bajpaie; Faizal Aziz	11 December 2018
194	194	"Kullfi Wants an Answer"	Pradeep Yadav	Sahana Bajpaie; Faizal Aziz	12 December 2018
195	195	"Loveleen Confronts Sikander"	Pradeep Yadav	Sahana Bajpaie; Faizal Aziz	13 December 2018
196	196	"Loveleen, Sikander at Loggerheads"	Pradeep Yadav	Sahana Bajpaie; Faizal Aziz	14 December 2018
197	197	"Loveleen Makes a Decision"	Pradeep Yadav	Sahana Bajpaie; Faizal Aziz	17 December 2018
198	198	"Are Kulfi, Amyra Alright?"	Pradeep Yadav	Sahana Bajpaie; Faizal Aziz	18 December 2018
199	199	"Amyra and Kulfi Take a Vow"	Pradeep Yadav	Sahana Bajpaie; Faizal Aziz	19 December 2018
200	200	"The Girls Team Up"	Pradeep Yadav	Sahana Bajpaie; Faizal Aziz	20 December 2018
201	201	"Kulfi, Amyra Make a Plan"	Pradeep Yadav	Sahana Bajpaie; Faizal Aziz	21 December 2018
