= Pari Hoon Main =

Indian television series

- Genre: Drama
- Starring: Rashami Desai; Mohit Malik; Karan Veer Mehra
- Opening theme: Pari Hoon Main
- Country of origin: India
- Original language: Hindi
- No. of seasons: 1
- No. of episodes: 132

Production
- Camera setup: Multi-camera
- Running time: Approx. 24 minutes
- Production company: B R films

Original release
- Network: STAR One
- Release: 28 January – 11 September 2008

Pari Hoon Main (transl. I Am a Fairy) is an Indian television series that premiered on 28 January 2008 on STAR One featuring Rashami Desai, Mohit Malik and Karan Veer Mehra in the lead roles.

== Plot ==
The story revolves around an ordinary girl named Nikki who lives with her aggressive uncle and aunt. Nikki bumps into the house of a famous film actress Pari, her doppelganger whose family is unaware of the incident. Nikki goes through the chaotic phenomenon soon after replacing the film star and lives under latter's image. Pari's boyfriend Rajveer (Mohit Malik) who's also a superstar, falls in love with Nikki, meanwhile the real Pari is comatose after an accident. Nikki who also falls for Rajveer, manages to carry on with her complicated lifestyle until Pari recovers consciousness and attempts reaching out to her family.

== Cast ==
- Rashami Desai as Nikki Shrivastav and Pari Rai Choudhary (look-alikes)
- Mohit Malik as Rajveer Kapoor
- Karan Veer Mehra as Karan Mehra
- Upasana Singh as Manorama
- Adi Irani as Nikki’s Uncle
- Jhumma Mitra as Sarita (Nikki’s best friend)
