= Mona Vasu =

Indian actress

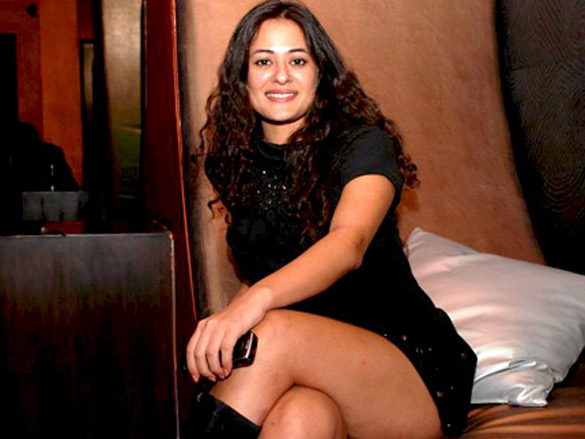
- Vasu in 2012
- Born: Kozhikode, Kerala, India
- Occupation: Actress
- Years active: 2003–present
- Known for: Miilee; Radhaa Ki Betiyaan Kuch Kar Dikhayengi; Parichay – Nayee Zindagi Kay Sapno Ka; Mannat – Har Khushi Paane Ki

Mona Vasu, also known as Mona Wasu, is an Indian actress who mainly works in Hindi television. Vasu is best known for playing the titular role of Miilee in Miilee, Rohini Sharma in Radhaa Ki Betiyaan Kuch Kar Dikhayengi, Richa Thakral in Parichay – Nayee Zindagi Kay Sapno Ka and Sonia "Aishwarya" Khanna in Mannat – Har Khushi Paane Ki.

== Early life ==
She completed her degree in Sociology from Sri Venkateswara College, New Delhi in 2003. She moved to Mumbai to pursue a career in acting.

== Career ==
Vasu started her career in 2003 by appearing in many ads for major brands. She hosted the weekly travel show Operation Gold from 2003 to 2004 on STAR Gold. The concept of the show was to know about the life of soldiers in the Indian Army. She played a leading role in the 2004 Sahara One telefilm 30 Day Trial. This light hearted rom-com was the story of a much-in-love couple, Nikhil (Kabir Sadanand) and Shailee (Mona Vasu), who are given an opportunity by their fathers, to live together for 30 days, before they decide to actually marry. Co-written by Suhana Bhatia and Rajen Makhijani, this film was nominated for 'Best Script' at the Indian Telly Awards that year.

Between 2005 and 2006, Vasu had played the title role in the primetime daily serial Miilee on Star Plus. In 2007, she hosted the weekly songs countdown show Idea Ek Se Bad Kar Ek on Star One which included categories like 'Top 10 Action Heroes', 'Top 10 Love Triangles' and 'Top 10 Sizzling Singles'.

Vasu had played the role of Savita in the TV serial Jamegi Jodi.com on 9X who is the daughter of Sulbha Arya who runs a match fixing agency, Bandhan. She also did an episodic role in the horror show Ssshhhh...Koi Hai. From 2008 to 2009, she played the role of Rohini, the eldest daughter, in the prime time soap opera Radhaa Ki Betiyaan Kuch Kar Dikhayengi on NDTV Imagine. In 2009, Vasu starred in an episode of Specials @ 10 on Sony TV.

The actress shot to fame, when Vasu won the reality show Iss Jungle Se Mujhe Bachao (the Indian version of I'm A Celebrity, Get Me Out of Here) in 2009. She played the role of the antagonist, Richa Thakral in Balaji Telefilms' Parichay. She was cast in the play, Red Hot directed by Saurabh Shukla which is an adaptation of a comedy play by Neil Simon, Last of the Red Hot Lovers. It was played in 2011 at Kamani in New Delhi, at Bharat Mahaotsav, the largest theatre festival in Asia and at Chaos, the annual festival of IIM Ahmedabad.

From January 2025 to January 2026, Vasu return on TV after 6 years hiatus playing Sonia "Aishwarya" Khanna Raisingh in Colors TV's Mannat – Har Khushi Paane Ki. Since September 2026, Vasu portrayed ACP Geeta Ahlawat in Zee TV's Jagadhatri.

== Filmography ==
=== Films ===
Year	Title	Role	Notes	Ref.
2013	Maazii	Shrishti Singh		
2014	Club 60	Dolly		

=== Television ===
Year	Title	Role	Notes	Ref.
2003–2004	Operation Gold	Host		
2004	30 Day Trial	Shailee	Telefilm	
2005–2006	Miilee	Miilee Rastogi		
2006	Ssshhhh... Phir Koi Hai	Niharika	Episode: "Victoria No. 401"	
2007	Aahat	Anjali	Episode: "Lizard"	
2007–2008	Jamegi Jodi.com	Savita		
2007	Ek Se Bad Kar Ek	Host		
2008–2009	Radhaa Ki Betiyaan Kuch Kar Dikhayengi	Rohini "Meethi" Sharma		
2009	Specials @ 10	Juhi		
2009	Iss Jungle Se Mujhe Bachao	Contestant	Winner	
2011	Hum - Ek Chote Gaon Ki Badi Kahani	Jyoti		
2011–2012	Parichay – Nayee Zindagi Kay Sapno Ka	Richa Thakral		
2014	Yudh	Mona Shekhar		
2019	Kulfi Kumarr Bajewala	Mia		
2024	Vanshaj	Shalini Talwar		
2025–2026	Mannat – Har Khushi Paane Ki	Sonia "Aishwarya" Khanna Raisingh		
2026–present	Jagadhatri	ACP Geeta Ahlawat		
2026–present	Apsara	Anjali Kapoor		

==== Special appearances ====
Year	Title	Role	Ref.
2005	Des Mein Niklla Hoga Chand	Miilee	
2011	Ratan Ka Rishta	Herself	
2019	Vikram Betaal Ki Rahasya Gaatha	Chudail	
2026	Dr. Aarambhi	Aishwarya Khanna Raisingh	

=== Web series ===
Year	Title	Role	Notes	Ref.
2020	Abki Bari Bipin Bihari			
2023	Kafas	Meghna	SonyLIV's series	

== Awards and nominations ==
Year	Award	Category	Work	Result	Ref.
2005	Indian Telly Awards	Fresh New Face – Female	Miilee	Won	
