= Kullfi Kumarr Bajewala =

2018 Indian musical television series by Gul Khan

- Genre: Drama
- Created by: Nilanjana Purkayasstha; Gul Khan
- Story by: Sahana; Faizal Akhtar; Lakshmi Jayakumar; Swechchha Bhagat; Pallavi Mehta; Dialogue: Divy Nidhi Sharma (Dialogues & Lyrics); Aparajita Sharma (Dialogues)
- Directed by: Pradeep Yadav
- Creative directors: Yashvardhan Shukla; Ketki WalWalkar
- Starring: Aakriti Sharma; Mohit Malik; Anjali Anand; Myra Singh; Shruti Sharma Rudra Kaushish
- Opening theme: "Pet Bechara" by Rashi Salil Harmalkar
- Composers: Sargam Jassu; Nakash Aziz
- Country of origin: India
- Original language: Hindi
- No. of seasons: 1
- No. of episodes: 494 (list of episodes)

Production
- Producers: Gul Khan; Karishma Jain; Nilanjana Purkayasstha; Herumb Khot
- Production locations: Mumbai; Pathankot
- Cinematography: Sandeep Yadav; Mohseen Swan
- Camera setup: Multiple-camera setup
- Running time: 21 minutes
- Production companies: 4 Lions Films; Invictus T Mediaworks

Original release
- Network: StarPlus; Hotstar
- Release: 19 March 2018 – 7 February 2020

Related
- Potol Kumar Gaanwala; Mouna Raagam

Kullfi Kumarr Bajewala (native name Hindi: कुल्फ़ी कुमार बाजेवाला, transl. Kullfi Kumarr The Musician) is an Indian musical drama television series that aired from 19 March 2018 to 7 February 2020 on Star Plus. Produced by Gul Khan, Karishma Jain and Nilanjana Purkayasstha, it was directed by Pradeep Yadav and written by Sahana and Faizal Akhtar. The show starred Aakriti Sharma, Mohit Malik, Anjali Anand, Myra Singh, Shruti Sharma and Vishal Aditya Singh and was a remake of the Bengali television series Potol Kumar Gaanwala.

The soundtrack is composed by Sargam Jassu and Nakash Aziz, with lyrics written by Shashank Kunwar, Divyanidhi Sharma, and edited Satya Sharma.

== Plot ==
Budding singer Sikandar Singh Gill falls in love with and secretly marries villager Nimrat Bhatia, who lives in Pathankot. But as forced to choose between Nimrat and his career, Sikandar goes on to latter and leaves her, unaware she is pregnant. He then marries the rich Lovely Chaddha.

=== 8 years later ===
Lovely has spoiled Amyra, her daughter. Nimrat's daughter Kullfi, unaware Sikandar is her father, aspires to be a singer like him. Nihalo hates but wants to cash in on her talent. Suffering cancer, Nimrat gets hit by Lovely's car and dies. Nihalo plans to sell Kullfi for her talent, but Sattu helps her escape.

Disguised as a boy, Kullfi enters Mumbai and accidentally reaches Sikandar's home. Lovely keeps her to use her voice to make Amyra singer successfully. She discloses Nimrat bore a daughter but gets Sikandar promise to not look out for her. He decides to teach Amyra and Kullfi music.

His brother, Mahinder finds out that Kullfi is Sikandar's daughter but is forced by their mother Sushila to keep the secret. Enters singer Tevar Singh, Lovely's ex-boyfriend. Amyra turns out to be their daughter through past affair. Sikandar learns Kullfi is a girl. Lovely threatens Mahinder that she will kill herself and Amyra if he reveals the truth about Kullfi's parentage to Sikandar.

Lovely misleads Tevar that Kullfi is their child and Nimrat adopted her. Tevar decides to formally adopt her. Lovely's plan works and Kullfi leaves to live with Tevar. Sikandar infers that Amyra is his step-daughter after hearing truth about her daughter.Tevar after understanding the real truth about his daughter he finally meet her for last time and then leave.Lovely implores him to accept her. Sattu tells Kullfi that Sikandar is her father. Insecure, Lovely poisons Amyra and manipulates everyone into agreeing to send Kullfi to boarding school.

Sikandar realises Kullfi is his daughter. Lovely sends her off to a juvenile remand home. Supervisor Ammaji mistreats Kullfi, who befriends some children. On Amyra's birthday Kulfi and some of her juvenile friends are invited to the party to sing and plan an escape but it fails as Kulfi hears Sikander's voice but is caught by Ammaji and is sent back to the juvenile and they are punished.Gradually, they escape and visit Sikandar, who not accepts Kullfi due to his promise to Amyra. Shocked, she runs away. Ashamed of his doings, Sikandar decides to win back Kullfi, who defeats Amyra in a singing contest, becoming the winner.

=== Few months later ===
Sikandar loses his memory in an accident and due to some misunderstandings, Chandan Chor takes his place. Sikandar lives with Dr. Nandini and her daughter Pakhi. Being a divorcée, she tells Pakhi that Sikandar is her father. Chandan loves Amyra more than Kulfi, which starts getting suspicious and also starts misbehaving with her. He also gets close to Lovely. Later Sikandar regains his memory. The family unites. Sikandar confesses Kullfi is his daughter. Proven guilty for killing Nimrat, Lovely is jailed.

Jimmy causes chaos in Sikandar, Kullfi and Amyra's lives, getting them evicted out their home and Amyra kidnapped. Lovely returns to help them in saving Amyra. Sikandar learns his health is deteriorating and he will die soon so he tries to make things better for Kullfi and Amyra. Later, they get their home back from Jimmy. Lovely wants to get rid of Kullfi once again. She turns Amyra against Kullfi.

Meanwhile, Kullfi meets Chalu who aids her in exposing Lovely, uniting with Amyra and treating Sikandar. Jimmy tries to kill Sikandar. Realising her mistakes and taking his place, Lovely dies. In the end, Sikandar happily sings with Kullfi and Amyra as they stare up to the stars where Kullfi says their mothers are among stars now.

== Cast ==
=== Main ===
- Aakriti Sharma as Kullfi Singh Gill: Singer; Nimrat and Sikandar's daughter; Loveleen's step-daughter; Amyra's step-sister (2018–2020)
- Mohit Malik as Sikandar Singh Gill/Chandan Chor/Murphy Singh: Singer; Sushila's younger son; Mahinder's brother; Nimrat and Lovely's widower; Kulfi's father; Amyra's step-father;/theif/Kulfi's agent/secretary (2018–2020)
- Vishal Aditya Singh as Tevar Singh: Singer; Lovely's ex-boyfriend; Amyra's father (2018)
- Anjali Anand as Loveleen "Lovely" Chaddha Singh Gill: Cutie and Tony's daughter; Sakshi's step-daughter; Saurabh and Kajal's half-sister; Tevar's ex-girlfriend; Sikandar's second wife; Amyra's mother; Kullfi's step-mother (2018–2020) (Dead)
- Myra Singh as Amyra Singh Gill: Lovely and Tevar's daughter; Sikandar's step-daughter; Kullfi's step-sister (2018–2020)

=== Recurring ===
- Mehul Buch as Tony Chaddha: Music producer; Cutie and Sakshi's husband; Lovely, Saurabh and Kajal's father; Amyra's grandfather (2018–2020)
- Anjali Gupta as Sakshi Rao Chaddha: Tony's second wife; Lovely's step-mother; Saurabh and Kajal's mother (2018–2020)
- Rudra Kaushish as Mahinder Singh Gill: Sushila's son; Sikandar's brother; Gunjan's husband; Kullfi's uncle (2018–2020)
- Pallavi Rao as Nihalo Kaur Singh: Sattu's wife; Bholi.and Kadu's mother;Kullfi's aunt (2018–2020)
- Vidya Sinha as Sushila Devi: Mahinder and Sikandar's mother; Kullfi's grandmother (2018–2019)
- Sunila Karambelkar as Cutie Arora: Tony's first wife; Lovely's mother; Saurabh and Kajal's step-mother; Amyra's grandmother (2018–2020)
- Ishrat Jahan as Gunjan Ahuja: Namrata's cousin; Mahinder's wife; Kullfi's aunt (2018–2020)
- Romanch Mehta as Satwant "Sattu" Kumar Bhatia: Nimrat's brother; Nihalo's husband; Bholi and Kadu's father; Kullfi's uncle (2018–2020)
- Ashwin Mushran as Roshan Kumar: Music director (2018)
- Shafaq Naaz as Niyati Khanna (2018)
- Kanishka Soni as Redkar (2018)
- Iris Maity as Dr. Nandini Sharma: Pakhi's mother (2019)
- Priyamvada Kant as Namrata Ahuja: Gunjan's cousin; Sikandar's lover (2019)
- Mrinmai Kolwalkar as Meenakshi "Minty" Attwal: Lovely's friend
- Mallika Nayak as Narmada "Ammaji" Devi: Boarding school head (2019)
- Viraj Kapoor as Rocket: Kullfi's friend (2019)
- Hemant Choudhary as Advocate Adinath "Adi" Irani: Lovely's lawyer (2018–2019)
- Rajeev Bhardwaj as David D'Souza: Susan's husband; Kullfi's kidnapper (2018)
- Sudeepta Singh as Susan D'Souza: David's wife (2018)
- Riney Aryaa as Irina:(upcoming actress)(2019)
- Rajat Sharma as Gaitonde: Videographer
- Mona Vasu as Mia (2019)
- Romit Raj as Vikram Ahuja (2019)
- Sulakshana Khatri (2019–2020)
- Vindhya Tiwari as Charumina "Chalu" Kaneja (2020)
- Deepali Saini as Sikander (Murfy Singh) 's fake wife
- Rushad Rana

=== Guests ===
- RJ Pritam Singh as host for Independence day concert (2018)
- Sunidhi Chauhan
- Nakash Aziz
- Sukhwinder Singh
- Kumar Sanu (2019)
- Udit Narayan as host of the singing show Little Superstar (2019)
- Usha Uthup as host of the singing show Little Superstar (2019)

== Production ==
=== Development ===
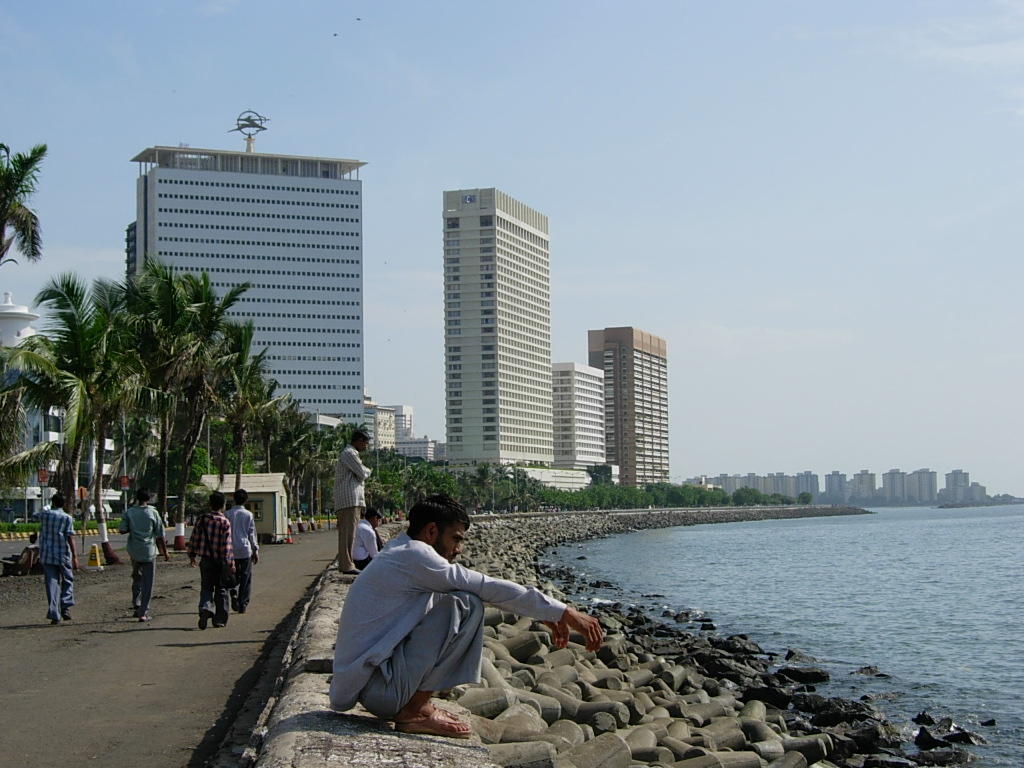
Filming location at Mumbai

Kullfi Kumarr Bajewala is an adaptation of the Bengali show, Potol Kumar Gaanwala. The production company, 4 Lions Films deals with Shree Venkatesh Films to remake the show in Hindi under the distributor of Star India. Hotstar streaming services distributor is under of Novi Digital Entertainment. The show is directed by Pradeep Yadava and Yashraj Shukla. The show's production staff were able to generate an episode in about three weeks. The director of photography are Sandeep and Yadav Mohseen Swan, who provided cinematography for every episodes. The crew used 5 small, special cameras for Visual Effects and the Multiple-camera setup was installed in 180 degrees. Currently, this show set in Mumbai and Pathankot. Actor Mohit Mallik said about Gul Khan's production, "I have worked with Gul Khan before on Suvreen Guggal. We have wanted to work together for a long time. She is a creative person and just a call away."

In January 2020, a leap in storyline was decided while Mohit Mallik decided to quit. But soon it was cancelled and he did not quit. The report stated, "Star Plus auditioned several girls to play Kullfi and Amyra and also men for Sikandar’s role. However, they couldn’t zero down suitable actors to play the lead roles in the show. As of now, ‘Kulfi Kumar Bajewala’ won't take a leap."

=== Casting ===
The show's main characters, Kullfi and Sikandar Singh Gill, were the core of the concept for Kullfi Kumarr Bajewala. These characters are taken from original television series Potol Kumar Gaanwala's Poteshwari and Sujon Kumar Malik. Kullfi's child character role is played by Aakriti Sharma. She was selected for her acting talent. Producer Nilanjana Purkayasstha said, "Aakriti is a very enthusiastic and fearless child." Otherside, Amyra character's role was decided to play by Spandan Chaturvedi but due to date issues, she was replaced by Myra Singh. Myra said, "It's my first time on television and I'm really excited to play this role." Actor Mohit Malik said about his role, "I have the signature rockstar look in Kullfi Kumarr Bajewala." Dhhai Kilo Prem's actress, Anjali Anand is playing Lovely Kaur character, who is Amyra's mother. She said, "Character matters the most to me and this character is extremely challenging and fun at the same time." Aakriti's brother, Hardik Sharma was going to join this show, debut as Kullfi's friend but later it delayed for script. Barun Sobti, who recently played on Gul Khan's Iss Pyaar Ko Kya Naam Doon 3, decided to play on this show debut as a Rockstar, Sikandar's competitor and Amyra's music teacher role. According to source, "Gul wanted to Barun in a significant role for this show. The makers are in talks to get Barun on board." Barun said, "It is exhausting. I am back in the grind. So we are in that zone where we are putting in everything that we have and hoping that people will like it." Later, due to issues, Barun was replaced by Vishal Aditya Singh, as Tevar Singh. Vishal said, "I am really excited to be a part of the show which is already being loved by the audience." Rajeev Bhardwaj, who had performed on Devon Ke Dev...Mahadev, has done major role for this show. He said, "Doing a cameo is like batting in a T20 match where you have to put in more effort and do more homework." Gul roped Priyamvada Kant for a significant role. Kant statement, "My previous show was historical and I wanted a major shift for my next role."

== Music ==
Kullfi Kumarr Bajewala Original Sound Track

Soundtrack album by Sargam Jassu, Nakash Aziz and Sanjeev Srivastava
- Released: 14 February 2018
- Genre: Popular music
- Language: Hindi
- Labels: Star India; Screen Journal; 4 Lions Films
- Producers: Gul Khan; Nilanjana Purkayasstha

Nakash Aziz chronology
No Entry Pudhe Dhoka Aahey (2012)	Kullfi Kumarr Bajewala (2018)

Singles from Kullfi Kumarr Bajewala
- 1. "Pet Bechara" Released: 13 March 2018

Sargam Jassu and Nakash Aziz is the music composer of this show. The soundtrack album was produced by Gul Khan and Nilanjana, written by Shashank Kunwar, Shaheen Iqbal and Satya Sharma. This album released several songs, which are featured by Rashi Salil Harmalkar, Bhaven Dhanak and Nakash. Song Dama Dam Mast Qalandar was remade for this show. The remade version also featured by Rashi Salil, which promo was released on 8 March 2018 via YouTube. The promo video has over 10 million views on YouTube. In addition to singing in an effort to explain something to the viewers. "Asha Ka Pathaasha" (Note: This male version song is originally released on episode fourteenth. Note that child version song was also released on the same episode.) male version song originally featured by Bhaven Dhanak. Music director Nakash said, "I am very excited and looking forward to the episode. We have created some lovely tracks and I enjoyed shooting them."

Track List
No.	Title	Artist	Length
1.	"Pet Bechara"	Rashi Salil Harmalkar	03:14
2.	"ABCD"	Rashi Salil Harmalkar	02:29
3.	"Yaara" (Child version)	Rashi Salil Harmalkar	01:06
4.	"Chand Banne Ke Liye" (Male version)	Nakash Aziz	02:30
5.	"Chidiya Gaaya Gaana"	Rashi Salil Harmalkar	03:30
6.	"Asha Ka Pathaasha" (Male version)	Bhaven Dhanak	03:26
7.	"Asha Ka Pathaasha" (Child version)	Rashi Salil Harmalkar	03:24
8.	"Maa Ka Tukra"	Rashi Salil Harmalkar	02:54
9.	"Jaago Re"	Rashi Salil Harmalkar	03:16
10.	"Yaara" (Male version)	Nakash Aziz	03:12
11.	"Yaara" (Female version)	Various artist	03:08
12.	"Mandir Ke Diya Jasi"	Rashi Salil Harmalkar	03:26
13.	"Jaag Jaa Na Maa"	Rashi Salil Harmalkar	03:46
14.	"Patang"	Rashi Salil Harmalkar	03:10
15.	"Ek Choti, Anek Choti"	Nakash Aziz	03:21
16.	"Kullfi Bana Ladka"	Rashi Salil Harmalkar	03:26
17.	"Giri Dhara"	Rashi Salil Harmalkar	03:32
18.	"Kheil Ha Baki Abhi"	Rashi Salil Harmalkar	03:02
19.	"Jab Phelibar Milay"	Sargam Jassu & Rashi Salil Harmalkar	03:06
20.	"Dil Ha Mera" (Jashn-E-Hindustan)	Sargam Jassu & Rashi Salil Harmalkar	05:16
21.	"Ishq da Jurmana"	Nakash Aziz	02:05

Track List: Kullfi Ke Khushi Ka Formula
No.	Title	Artist	Length
1.	"ABCD"	Rashi Salil Harmalkar	02:29
2.	"Chhota Chuara"	Rashi Salil Harmalkar	02:42
3.	"Sa Re Ga Ma"	Rashi Salil Harmalkar	05:25
4.	"Kullfi Bani Ladka"	Rashi Salil Harmalkar	01:00
5.	"Maa"	Rashi Salil Harmalkar	02:01
6.	"Pet Bechara"	Rashi Salil Harmalkar	03:16
7.	"Shriman Kuttaji"	Rashi Salil Harmalkar	02:19
8.	"Tap Tap Tapar"	Rashi Salil Harmalkar	08:21

Track List: Remake edition
No.	Title	Artist	Length
1.	"Dama Dam Mast Qalandar"	Rashi Salil Harmalkar	02:38
2.	"Haathi Ghoda Palki"	Rashi Salil Harmalkar	02:50
3.	"Bulleya"	Rashi Salil Harmalkar	03:10
4.	"Tum Aa Gaye Ho"	Rashi Salil Harmalkar	03:17

== Release ==
=== Marketing ===
On 14 February 2018, the first promo of the show was released, with the title song. On 28 February 2018, the second promo of the show was released which is based on Kullfi, wished Happy Holi. Soon after, the promo began trending on Twitter with the hashtag #Kullfi. On 24 February 2018, child artiste Aakriti Sharma and actress Shruti Sharma welcomed the production team, media and public with colours of Holi, location at Lucknow. On 10 March 2018, a musical concert was organized by Gul Khan at Chandigarh, Punjab. The musical concert was performed by child artiste Aakriti Sharma, Punjabi singer and songwriter, Gurdas Maan, the Nooran Sisters and Rajasthani young maestros, the Langa Kids.

=== Premiere ===
The show replaced the prime time slot of Ikyawann, but Panorama Entertainment's production producer Suzana Ghai confirmed that Ikyawann was not going to air off, it replaced the time slot of Meri Durga, which was aired off. On 19 March 2018, the show was first released on the Hotstar streaming service, for the premium viewers of India. Later, this show broadcast on the Star Plus. In countries like Bangladesh, Indonesia, Malaysia, Myanmar, Nepal, Pakistan, Singapore, Sri Lanka and United Kingdom broadcast on the original release date. On 20 March 2018, the show was released in United States.

Owing to its declining trp ratings, it was shifted to the evening time slot 6:30 pm from its prime time slot 8:30 pm (IST) and was replaced by Yehh Jadu Hai Jinn Ka! on 14 October 2019 produced by the same production house. On 23 December 2019, it was shifted to 7:00 pm (IST) replacing Namah.

== Reception ==
=== Ratings ===
In its first week, the show was ranked in the top sixteen in India. The show has received a number of Target rating point, 4323 impressions, which means more than 4.3 million viewers watched this show in its first week. This show was ranked in the top one in the United Kingdom. More than 98,000 viewers watched this show in the UK. Kullfi Kumarr Bajewala had taken Yeh Hai Mohabbatein position, which was previously the premier Hindi show in the UK. During the third week, this show catapulted to eighth position, with 4.8 million impressions in India. During the sixth week, this show climbed up to sixth place in India. During the ninth week, this show has reached at the top fifth position with 4500 impressions. During thirtieth week, the show received 6731 impressions with fourth position.

In the tables below, the blue numbers represent the lowest ratings or ranks and the red numbers represent the highest ratings or ranks.

Ratings history chart
Week no.	Episodes	BARC's rank	Published date	Target rating point (impressions)
34	166–170	4	12 November 2018	6.3
38	191–195	3	13 December 2018	7.5

== Awards and nominations ==
Kullfi Kumarr Bajewala and its cast and crew have been nominated for Gold Awards 2018 and Indian Television Academy Awards. Child actress Aakriti has received her first award for this show as the Best Child Actor. Otherside, Mohit Malik has won the Stellar Performer of the Year award for his exhibiting role.

Year	Award	Category	Recipient	Result	Reference
2018	Gold Awards	Best Child Actor	Aakriti Sharma	Won	
2018	Gold Awards	Stellar Performer of the Year	Mohit Malik	Won	
2018	Zee Rishtey Awards	Best Show	Gul Khan	Won	
2018	Indian Television Academy Awards	Best Actor (Jury)	Mohit Malik	Nominated	
2018	Indian Television Academy Awards	Best Child Actor	Aakriti Sharma	Won	
2018	Indian Television Academy Awards	Best Show (Jury)	Gul Khan	Won	
2018	Indian Television Academy Awards	Best Director (Jury)	Pradeep Yadav	Nominated	
2018	Indian Television Academy Awards	Best Actress in a Negative Role	Anjali Anand	Nominated	
2018	Indian Television Academy Awards	Best Lyrics		Won	
2018	Indian Television Academy Awards	Best Dialogues		Won	
2019	Lions Gold Awards	Best Child Actor	Aakriti Sharma	Won	
2019	Lions Gold Awards	Best Actor (Popular)	Mohit Malik	Nominated	
2019	Lions Gold Awards	Best Actor (Jury)	Mohit Malik	Won	
2019	Lions Gold Awards	Best Show	Gul Khan	Nominated	
