= Pandya Store =

Indian television series

- Genre: Drama; Romance
- Developed by: Priya Thambi
- Written by: Yash Kumar Sharda
- Screenplay by: Sushil Chaubey; Kiran Kulkarni
- Story by: Shilpa Chaubey
- Directed by: Pradeep Yadav; Arshad Khan
- Creative directors: Aman Jain; Dharmi Chheda; Kashvi Sharma
- Starring: Kinshuk Mahajan; Shiny Doshi; Akshay Kharodia; Kanwar Dhillon; Mohit Parmar; Alice Kaushik; Simran Budharup; Kruttika Desai; Priyanshi Yadav; Rohit Chandel
- Music by: Nakash Aziz; Sargam Jassu
- Country of origin: India
- Original language: Hindi
- No. of seasons: 2
- No. of episodes: 1137

Production
- Executive producer: Fuzel Ahmad Khan
- Producers: Sunjoy Waddhwa; Commal Sunjoy Waddhwa
- Production locations: Mumbai; Somnath; Bikaner
- Cinematography: Santosh Suryavanshi; Kshitij Bhavsar
- Editor: Janak Chauhan
- Camera setup: Multi-camera
- Running time: 20–24 minutes
- Production company: Sphere Origins

Original release
- Network: StarPlus
- Release: 25 January 2021 – 26 May 2024

Related
- Pandian Stores; Gupta Brothers

Pandya Store (transl. Shop of the Pandyas) is an Indian Hindi-language television family drama series that premiered from 25 January 2021 to 26 May 2024 on Star Plus. It streams digitally on Disney+ Hotstar. Produced by Sunjoy Waddhwa and Commal Waddhwa under their banner Sphere Origins, the series is an official adaptation of Star Vijay's Tamil series Pandian Stores. One of the longest running Indian television soap opera, the series starred Kinshuk Mahajan, Shiny Doshi, Akshay Kharodia, Kanwar Dhillon, Mohit Parmar, Alice Kaushik, Simran Budharup, Kruttika Desai, Priyanshi Yadav and Rohit Chandel.

== Premise ==
Gautam and Dhara Pandya, a middle-class married couple, manage the Pandya Store. In addition to running the business, Dhara also takes care of Gautam's three younger brothers: Dev, Shiva, and Krish. Shiva is married to Raavi, while Dev is married to Rishita. The story follows Dhara's efforts to keep the family united despite numerous challenges. Later, Dhara and Gautam adopt Yashodhan, the son of a con woman, Shweta, who had deceitfully married Krish. However, Shweta later reforms and allows Krish to marry Prerna. Dev and Rishita have two children—a daughter, Natasha, and a son, Shesh—while Raavi and Shiva have a son named Rishank. Eventually, the Pandya couples pass away, and the story shifts focus to Natasha, her Pandya siblings' struggles, and her love story with Dhawal Makwana. After overcoming several hardships, the couple reunites with their daughter, Naveli, and both families come together for a happy ending.

== Plot ==
The Pandyas are a middle-class family residing in Somnath. The family comprises Darshan and Suman Pandya and their four sons, Gautam, Dev, Shiva and Krish. Their daily life is dependent on their only source of income, their grocery store named Pandya Store. Dhara marries Gautam, the eldest son of the Pandya family, when Anita refuses to marry him as his store is in debt. She raises her brothers-in-law like her sons and they consider her like their mother. Initially she is not accepted by Suman, but after facing several tribulations, Dhara is finally accepted by her mother-in-law. Dhara and Gautam get the store back, after they find legal papers left by Darshan and decide to work together to free their store from all debts.

=== 10 years later ===
Dev, Shiva, and Krish have grown up. They still love Dhara and take care of her diligently. The Pandyas are finally able to get their Pandya Store back, after clearing the debts. Raavi and Dev's wedding is fixed by Dhara to bring the families together. Shiva and Raavi, who are childhood foes, are married against their will, as Dev refuses to marry Raavi and she attempts suicide. Dev and Rishita are in love from college and they marry alongside Shiva and Raavi. While Raavi struggles in her marriage with Shiva, Rishita finds it difficult to adjust in the Pandya Niwas.

The story now revolves around Dhara and how she unites the Pandya family after the entry of the new daughters-in-law Raavi and Rishita. While Prafulla wants to separate Shiva and Raavi and harm the Pandyas, Janardhan constantly insults Gautam and other Pandyas for marrying Rishita and Dev without his consent. The Pandya's plan Raavi's birthday party, where Dev apologies to Raavi. Krish and Rishita's sister Kirti become friends and grow closer as Krish is smitted by Kirti.

Gautam-Dhara, Dev-Rishita share romantic moments, while Shiva and Raavi grow closer and start caring for each other. The Pandya's keep a mannat and fulfils it successfully. During the same, Shiva questions Raavi's character in public and they end up breaking apart as Raavi slaps him. Raavi leaves the house due to the fight. The Pandya's rejoice as they receive the news of Dhara's pregnancy. Raavi returns home after learning about Dhara, but is coldly welcomed by Dhara and Suman. Gautam asks Shiva and Raavi to end their fight.

Dhara is kidnapped and Krish is jailed by Janardhan. Shiva and Raavi decide to get divorced as they are unable to resolve their issues. Suman decides to have Shiva marry Disha. Due to Disha's presence, Shiva and Raavi realise their feelings for each other. On the Pandya's insistence and Suman's acceptance, they cancel the divorce. Gautam decides to terminate Dhara's pregnancy due to the fetus' stagnant growth and Dhara's deteriorating health, much to Dhara and Suman's dismay. Dhara is distraught after the abortion but brings in a huge order for the store.

Later, the Pandya brothers are arrested in a false fraud case and the Pandya ladies struggle to get them out. Rishita struggles in her job and asks Krish to stay away from Kirti, whereas Krish struggles in his relationship with Kirti due to his poor finances. He ends up stealing money. Raavi is kidnapped, which makes Shiva realise his feelings. He saves Raavi and decides to confess his love for her. Rishita leaves the house with Dev because of her arguments with Dhara and Gautam. Shiva plans a surprise for Raavi, but she destroys it due to misunderstanding. While Raavi and Rishita accuse Dhara for not considering them a part of the family. Later, her plan to revive the Pandya Store fails and the store faces loss.

Gautam and Dhara decide to opt for IVF, but their dream is destroyed by Anita as she is jealous of Dhara, Anita blames Raavi. Suman does not want Raavi to stay with them, while Raavi signs the divorce papers, unaware of Prafulla's trick. Raavi confesses her love but Shiva expels her from the house. She decides to fight for her love and is adamant to marry Shiva again. Dhara, believes Raavi and makes a secret wedding plan with other Pandyas, except Suman. Suman and Prafulla decide to stop the wedding. Eventually, Shiva and Raavi confess their love and marry, they are finally accepted by Suman. The Pandyas save their store from Janardhan's evil plan.

Rishita discovers that she is pregnant, she initially decides to abort the baby but changes her mind later making the Pandyas are excited and happy. Janardhan and family are insulted by Dhara during Holi. Dev and Rishita leave the Pandya house after Rishita feels her baby is unsafe due to Dhara's presence, she also insults Shiva for being uneducated, but Raavi supports him and questions Rishita. Raavi asks Shiva to continue his studies so that he can prove Rishita wrong. Dev and Rishita's anniversary is celebrated by the Pandyas. But, it is spoiled due to misunderstandings. Janardhan gifts Dev and Rishita a store named "Pandya & Grandson" in order to humiliate the Pandyas. Shiva wins the competition against Rishita and repairs the Pandya store with the prize money. While the Pandyas celebrate Shiva's win, Rishita discovers Kamini's evil plan and asks her to not harm her family. The Pandyas decide to work as maids in the Dwivedi house to bring Dev and Rishita back after Suman fell ill due to their absence. During Rishita's godh bharai, Kamini's true colors are revealed by Kalyani, and Dev and Rishita return home. Kirti breaks her relationship with Krish and insults him as she does not want her comfort to suffering and does not want to adjust like Rishita.

On Shiva's birthday, his bus meets with an accident and he is presumed dead. The Pandyas are stunned, but Raavi does not believe the news. They repair the Pandya Store with Shiva's death insurance money. Shiva is alive and disguises himself but, Dhara and Raavi learn of it. The Pandyas together sell their ancestral property and repay the insurance money. Afterward, Raavi becomes a social media star with Shiva's support and starts earning. Pandya's celebrates her big success, but misunderstandings grow between Shiva and Raavi. Dhara brings a baby boy home after his mother leaves him with her. While Dhara and Gautam adopt the baby boy Yashodhan fondly called Chiku, Rishita and Dev are blessed with a baby girl Sanchi, who is fondly called Chhutki.

Dhara and Rishita perform Chiku and Chutki's Naam Karan ceremony. Raavi has a minor accident, after which she and Shiva reunite. Rishita opens her cosmetic business with Dev and Raavi buys a car for the Pandyas. While Rishita battles post-partum depression, Raavi's account is hacked, and they both are supported by the family. Chiku's biological mother, Shweta enters the Pandya house. She creates misunderstandings between the family members, for her own benefit. Pandya celebrates Suman's sixtieth birthday when Shweta has Chiku kidnapped.

To keep Dhara and Chiku together, Krish proposes marriage to Shweta and she agrees. Later, the Pandyas also favor marriage. Rishita tries to find evidence against Shweta. Raavi finally catches her culprit, but Shiva misunderstands her and Arnav's friendship. Krish and Shweta marry despite Dhara, Raavi, and Rishita's attempts to stop the marriage. Post-marriage, Rishita exposes Shweta but she blames Deven. Shweta starts to divide the Pandya family, to gain Chiku's custody from Dhara. When Raavi misses her periods and has her fibroid removal surgery, Shweta replaces the report with that of fetus removal surgery. Shiva questions Raavi's character, so she and Dhara leave the house. The Pandyas are finally able to expose Shweta, after discovering her plan and they oust her from their house. While Shiva regrets his behavior towards Raavi, she decides to leave Pandya's house.

Shweta decides to divide the Pandyas and starts begging. Raavi and Shiva unite after a major showdown and promise each other to never have trust issues. Shweta ask for 25 lakhs from the Pandyas in lieu of Chiku, but instead takes over the Pandya Store. She puts the store on sale. This create a rift among the family members who blame Dhara. Eventually they recover their store by using Shweta's trick on her. Shweta decides to take revenge and while the Pandyas are celebrating Sankranti, she decides to kidnap Chiku, but due to Shiva's intervention, she elopes with Chutki. Dev and Rishita leaves the house heartbroken. Raavi leaves the house after Shiva's condition worsens in the hospital due to the incident. Dhara blames Krish for the mishappenings and he leaves the house too.

=== 7 years later ===
Dhara and Gautam have a relationship while Suman hates Chiku. Raavi lives in Varodara with Shiva, who has lost his memory and mental state, and her son Mithu. Dev and Rishita live in Ahmedabad with their son, Shesh. Krish has shifted to Canada and has become a businessman. Shweta lives in Mumbai with Chutki who works in tv shows. The Pandyas return home after Suman suffers a heart attack. She and Dhara decide to fake her ill health so that the family remains united. Raavi and Rishita decide to sell the house and get a share after they learn of their plan.

Shweta return to the Pandya Niwas and ask for 50 lakhs in exchange of Chutki. She realise she and Krish are not divorced and return to Pandya Niwas with Chutki, who hates her brothers and Rishita. She ask Krish to live with her despite his engagement with Prerna. Raavi and Shiva move out of the house so that Shiva does not see Shweta and they spend some time together. Pandyas learn of Chutki's kidney condition and decides to have her operated on. During the Holi celebration, Chutki and Chiku learn that their parents being not their real parents. Shiva finally meets Shweta and suffers a major shock. The children leave the house, after being upset with their parents.

Shweta meets the children and lies to them about their real parents, upsetting the children. Meanwhile, Shiva loses his memory after the shock and forgets his marriage with Raavi. Raavi moves out of the house and meets her brother and Prafulla's son Shivank, who has a hidden motive. It is revealed that he has been blackmailing Dhara and is working alongside Shweta. Dhara exposes Shivank, but Shivank manages to win the Pandya's trust. Pandyas sent Shweta to jail and Dhara becomes Chutki's donor. During the operation, due to Chutki's persistence, Krish bails Shweta out. Chiku and Chutki decide to stay with the Pandyas.

The Pandyas rejoice after Prerna agrees to marry Krish. During the wedding, with Shivank's help, Shweta remarries Krish and Shivank marries Prerna. Shweta lies about being pregnant with Krish's child, making Suman accept the marriage. Desperate to get married, Shiva meets Dhara's half-sister Aarushi and agrees to marry her against the family. Raavi is devastated by his decision and later meets Aarushi and reveals about her and Shiva's marriage but Aarushi challenges Raavi to marry Shiva despite the truth, to Dhara. Dhara learns about Arushi and Malti. Shivank is exposed when he tries to molest Prerna and is arrested. Prerna is revealed to be pregnant with Krish's child, much to the Pandyas' dismay.

Raavi exposes Dhara and Arushi's truth of the family and blames Dhara. Raavi, Rishita and Dev plan to trigger Shiva's memory by recreating the kidnapping moment. Raavi, Dhara and the Pandyas decide to recreate Shiva Raavi's wedding. On the wedding day, Shiva agrees to marry Raavi after her feigned suicide attempt, but flees after the truth. During his wedding with Arushi, Shiva remembers his past and reconciles with Raavi. Finally Shiva and Raavi, Dev and Rishita, and Krish and Prerna marry. After Dhara reconciles with Malti, she loses her in a gas leak accident that leaves Dhara and Chutki ill, making the Pandyas worry till they finally recover.

While Chikoo comes closer to Shweta, he grows apart from Dhara. Shiva and Raavi fight over Mithu's upbringing and his future. Rishita decides to get a share from the family for Chutki's future. Raavi does the same for Mithu. As everyone requests their share, Gautam decides to sell the house despite Dhara's opposition. Chiku leaves the house with Shweta. The Pandyas start living separately, but miss each other. During Hardik's wedding, the family reunites and promises to be together forever. They decide to take a loan for their new house, but an earthquake strikes and the Pandya brothers and their wives die, leaving the children and Suman alone. Chiku asks Dhara to take him back, but leaves the country with Shweta, when she fails to arrive.

=== 15 years later ===
Natasha, Mithu and Shesh are grown up and live with Suman, who misses her children and Chiku. Natasha sacrifices her MBA dream to take care of Pandya Store. She meets Dhawal at her college, whose brother Amrish wants the store so that he can build his dream mall. The Makwanas and the Pandyas are constantly at loggerheads. Amrish decides to get Natasha and Dhawal married for the store. While Suman agrees, Amba opposes the marriage. The Makwana family does not allow the females to work and has strict rules for them, a fact they hide from the Pandyas and Chirag's wife Dolly. Bhaven's wife Pranali tries to expose them but fails. After much struggling, Natasha and Dhawal are married. Chiku returns to Somanth after he learns about the mall project.

After her marriage, Natasha tries to unite the Makwanas and change certain rules, but is welcomed by Amba who foils all her efforts. She makes Hetal meet her brother on Rakhsha Bandhan. When Chiku tries to destroy the Pandya Store, Suman, Mithu and Shesh fight him. While, Natasha and Dhawal grow closer, Amba repeatedly insults the Pandyas. During a Temple visit, Chiku saves Suman and earns affection from the Pandyas, but decided to keep his identity a secret. Amba tries to destroy the unity of her daughter-in-laws and instigate them against each other. Chiku forms a bond with Suman, Mithu and Shesh. Dhawal feels guilty for hiding the truth from Natasha.

While protecting the Makwana brothers from mall labours, Natasha learns the truth of her marriage and Amrish's to destroy Pandya Store. Amidst this, Suman falls gravely ill, and to keep her happy, Natasha lies about the betrayal she faced from the Makwanas. Chiku reveals his true identity to Pandya family, except Suman, and the Makwana family, while fighting the latter for betraying the Pandyas.

== Cast ==
=== Main ===
- Kinshuk Mahajan as Gautam "Gombi" Pandya – Suman and Darshan's eldest son; (2021–2023)
- Shiny Doshi as Dhara Patel Pandya – Malti's elder daughter; (2021–2023)
- Kanwar Dhillon as Shiva Pandya – Suman and Darshan's third son; (2021–2023)
  - Harminder Singh as Child Shiva Pandya (2021)
- Alice Kaushik as Raavi Shah Pandya – Urmila and Mansukh's daughter; (2021–2023)
  - Jini Khan as Child Raavi Shah (2021)
- Akshay Kharodia as Dev Pandya – Suman and Darshan's second son; (2021–2023)
  - Jovian Fernandes as Child Dev Pandya (2021)
- Simran Budharup as Rishita Dwivedi Pandya – Kalyani and Janardhan's elder daughter; (2021–2023)
- Mohit Parmar as Krish Pandya – Suman and Darshan's youngest son; (2021–2023)
  - Swarnim Neema as Child Krish Pandya (2021)
- Kruttika Desai as Suman Narayan Pandya – Jagat's sister; (2021–2024)
- Priyanshi Yadav as Sanchi "Chutki" / Natasha Pandya Makwana – Rishita and Dev's daughter; (2023–2024)
  - Kiara Sadh as Child Sanchi "Chutki" / Natasha Pandya (2023)
- Rohit Chandel as Dhawal Makwana – Amba and Arvind's youngest son; (2023–2024)

=== Recurring ===
- Pallavi Rao as Prafulla Narang Narayan – Jignesh and Urmila's sister; (2021–2022)
- Shrasti Maheshwari as Anita Narang - Jignesh's daughter; (2021–2022)
- Ankita Bahuguna as Shweta Patel - Harikishan and Jhankana's daughter; (2022–2023)
- Maira Dharti Mehta as Prerna Pandya – Mahesh and Ruchi's daughter; (2023)
- Sahil Uppal as Yashodhan "Chiku" Pandya – Shweta and Deven's son; (2023–2024)
  - Vidhaan Sharma as Child Yashodhan "Chiku" Pandya (2023)
  - Azan as Baby Yashodhan "Chiku" Pandya (2022–2023)
- Surabhi Das as Esha Makwana Pandya – Amba and Arvind's daughter; (2023–2024)
- Roshan Kapoor as Rishank "Mithu" Pandya – Raavi and Shiva's son; (2023-2024)
  - Ronav Vaswani as Child Rishank "Mithu" Pandya (2023)
- Harsh Mehta as Shesh Pandya – Rishita and Dev's son; (2023–2024)
  - Raanav Sharma as Child Shesh Pandya (2023)
- Harithi Joshi as Naveli Makwana – Natasha and Dhawal's daughter; (2024)
- Ankur Nayyar as Amrish Makwana – Amba and Arvind's eldest son; (2023–2024)
- Piyali Munsi / Falaq Naaz as Hetal Makwana – Amrish's widow; Govind's mother (2023–2024) / (2024)
- Shabaaz Abdullah Badi as Bhaven Makwana – Amba and Arvind's second son; Amrish, Chirag, Dhawal and Esha's brother; Pranali's husband; Ronit's father; Naveli's adoptive father (2023–2024)
- Deepika Upadhyay as Dr. Pranali Makwana – Paresh's elder daughter; Namita's sister; Bhaven's wife; Ronit's mother; Naveli's adoptive mother (2023–2024)
- Abhishek Sharma as Chirag Makwana – Amba and Arvind's third son; Amrish, Bhaven, Dhawal and Esha's brother; Dolly's husband; Ruhi's father (2023–2024)
- Sayli Chaudhari as Dolly Makwana – Chirag's wife; Ruhi's mother (2023–2024)
- Ananya Khare as Amba Makwana – Arvind's widow; Amrish, Bhaven, Chirag, Dhawal and Esha's mother; Govind, Ruhi, Naveli and Ronit's grandmother (2023–2024)
- Vansh Sayani as Govind "Golu" Makwana – Hetal and Amrish's son; Ruhi, Naveli and Ronit's cousin (2024)
  - Hishaan Rogha as Child Govind "Golu" Makwana (2023–2024)
- Aaradhya Patel as Ruhi Makwana – Dolly and Chirag's daughter; Golu, Naveli and Ronit's cousin (2024–2024)
- Viraj Singh as Ronit "Bunty" Makwana – Pranali and Bhaven's son; Govind, Ruhi, Naveli's cousin (2024)
- Devishi Madan as Kirti Dwivedi – Kalyani and Janardhan's younger daughter; Rishita's sister; Krish's former love interest (2021–2022)
- Vijay Badlani as Janardhan Dwivedi – Kamini's brother; Kalyani's husband; Rishita and Kirti's father; Sanchi and Shesh's grandfather; Naveli's great-grandfather (2021–2022)
- Geetika Shyam as Kalyani Dwivedi – Janardhan's wife; Rishita and Kirti's mother; Sanchi and Shesh's grandmother; Naveli's great-grandmother (2021–2022)
- Vandana Vithlani as Kamini Dwivedi Thakkar – Janardhan's sister; Somendra's wife; Rishita and Kirti's aunt (2021–2022)
- Shyaam Makhecha as Hardik Patel – Malti's son; Dhara's brother; Arushi's half-brother; Kajal's husband (2021–2023)
- Krunal Pandit as Jagat Narayan – Suman's brother; Prafulla's husband; Shivank's father; Raavi's uncle and adoptive father (2021–2022)
- Heena Parmar as Arushi – Malti's younger daughter; Hardik and Dhara's half-sister; Shiva's former fiancée (2023)
- Arjun Singh Shekhawat as Shivank Narayan – Prafulla and Jagat's son; Gautam, Dev, Shiva, Krish, Raavi and Anita's cousin; Prerna's former husband (2023)
- Sagar Parekh as Shantanu "Shanu" Pandit – Tanu's brother; Natasha's lover (2024)
- Farukh Saeed as Darshan Pandya – Suman's late husband; Gautam, Dev, Shiva and Krish's father; Natasha, Shesh and Rishank's grandfather; Naveli's great-grandfather (2021)
- Renu Pandey as Kanta Patel – Suman's best friend (2021–2024)
- Mohit Sharma as Jignesh Narang – Prafulla and Urmila's brother; Anita's father; Raavi and Shivank's uncle (2021)
- Ankita Sood as Disha – Shiva's former prospective bride (2021)
- Jinal Jain as Sneha Mittal – Raavi's friend (2021)
- Harttaj Gill as Arnav - Raavi's friend and former boss (2022)
- Rajani Gupta as Jhankana Patel - Harikishan's wife; Shweta's mother; Yashodhan's grandmother (2022)
- Sanjeev Sharma / Amitesh Prasad as Harikishan "Hari" Patel - Jhankana's husband; Shweta's father; Yashodhan's grandfather (2022) / (2023)
- Gayatri Soham as Malti Devi – Hardik, Dhara and Aarushi's mother; Yashodhan's adoptive grandmother (2023)
- Rekha Desai as Ruchi - Mahesh's wife; Prerna's mother (2023)
- Vinod Motwani as Mahesh - Ruchi's husband; Prerna's father (2023)
- Nitin Sharma as Deven - Shweta's former love interest; Yashodhan's father (2022)
- Riddhi Singh as Forum - Shweta's friend (2022)
- Suraj Kakkar as Shashank – Dhawal and Yashodhan's friend (2024)
- Megha Sharma as Chhabili – Makwana's house help and Amba's confidant (2023–2024)
- Vikas Grover as Sandip – Natasha's obsessive lover (2023–2024)
- Rashmi Gupta as Suhani – Dhawal's former fiancée (2023–2024)
- Sudipti Parmar Shukla as Shalini Dave – Amrish's former fiancée (2024)
- Rajesh Ganesh Sharma as Paresh – Pranali and Namita's father; Amrish's clerk; Ronit's grandfather (2023)
- Surbhi Mittal as Namita – Paresh's younger daughter; Pranali's sister (2023)
- Tripti Sharma as Juhi – Dhawal's boss (2024)
- Anshul Bammi as Fake Yashodhan "Chiku" Pandya (2023)

=== Special appearances ===
- Hina Khan as Akshara Singhania from Yeh Rishta Kya Kehlata Hai to promote the ten-year leap (2021)
- Ragini Khanna as Suhana Kashyap from Sasural Genda Phool to promote the ten-year leap (2021)
- Neelu Vaghela as Santosh Rathi from Diya Aur Baati Hum to promote the ten-year leap (2021)
- Ulka Gupta as Banni Chow to promote Banni Chow Home Delivery (2022)
- Celesti Bairagey as Rajjo Dhaki to promote Rajjo (2022)
- Falguni Pathak as herself during Krish and Prerna's wedding (2023)
- Sayli Salunkhe as Vandana "Vandu" Karmarkar to promote Baatein Kuch Ankahee Si (2023)
- Bhoomi Trivedi as herself during Dhawal and Natasha's wedding (2023)
- Hiba Nawab as Jhanak Raina to promote Jhanak (2023)
- Aditya Narayan as himself during Dhawal and Natasha's party (2024)

== Production ==
=== Development ===
In January 2020, Star Plus planned an official Hindi remake of Star Vijay's Tamil series Pandian Stores, to be produced by Mahesh Pandey Productions under the title Khandaan. With a change in title to Hum– Ek Makaan Ek Dukaan, filming began in February 2020 with portions shot in Varanasi, but shooting was halted in March 2020 due to the coronavirus pandemic.

After the lockdown, the series was shifted to Star Bharat. The channel changed its programming genre to comedy from drama due to which it was scrapped and the plot was changed completely to suit it. Later, filming began in July 2020 post-COVID break and the show was aired with the title Gupta Brothers - Chaar Kunware From Ganga Kinaare from 5 October 2020, as a dramedy series to suit Star Bharat's comedy genre.

In December 2020, Star Plus announced another Hindi television remake of Pandian Stores titled Pandya Store produced by Sphere Origins which premiered on 25 January 2021. With the launch of the second official Hindi television remake of Pandian Stores; the first official Hindi television remake Gupta Brothers was announced to go off-air on 5 February. But, later, Gupta Brothers went off-air abruptly on 26 January, earlier than the announced date.

Deven Bhojani was hired as the creative consultant for Pandya Store in January 2021. On his part, Bhojani said, "I feel privileged to be working with this wonderful team as a Creative Consultant. Brainstorming sessions with the team and the channel about various aspects with regard to the show have been quite fun. Workshops with the actors have also been pretty rigorous and rewarding. They certainly are one hardworking bunch and as a team, we are delighted to bring forth 'Pandya Store' to the audience."

In March 2021, the show took a generation leap of ten years and the characters of Dev, Shiva, Krish and Raavi were grown up. The first post-leap episode was telecast on 5 March 2021.

In mid-2022, there were various reports of the show going off-air or going through a leap. However, soon the ratings rose and all the reports were denied by the cast.

During Shiva's death sequence, Kanwar Dhillon, who portrays Shiva, disguised himself as six characters, including a transgender. Alice Kaushik, who portrays Raavi, was dressed as a ghost resembling Vidya Balan's Manjulika from Bhool Bhulaiyaa during the same track.

In January 2023, the show took a leap of seven years. After the leap, new generation of Pandya children were introduced to bring a "fresh look" to the show. In July 2023, the show took a generation leap. The original main cast of the show, except Kruttika Desai left the show. The lead cast shot their last scene on 18 July 2023.

In May 2024, the show took another leap of seven years, with the introduction of the new generation of Makwana children.

=== Casting ===
Kinshuk Mahajan was cast to portray Gautam Pandya opposite Doshi. On preparing for which Mahajan said, "To fit into the skin of my character I had to lose about 5kgs and had a grueling diet. Also since this show is based in Somnath, Gujarat, I had to work on my dialect, luckily Shiny, my co-actor was my guide. Above all, shooting in Somnath and Bikaner was a blessing." Shiny Doshi was cast to portray Dhara Patel, opposite Mahajan. Doshi said, "I play a strong and positive character. I somehow relate to my character, Dhara. I am a gujarati, even then it was necessary to work towards certain nuances to meet the requirements of my character. We also attended workshops before we began shooting for the show."

Kanwar Dhillon was cast as the elder version of Shiva Pandya, which was previously portrayed by Harminder Singh. He was cast opposite Kaushik. Dhillon said, "Shiva is a very much regular guy who is fun-loving and emotional. He has a different layering with each character in the show and can't be the same with everyone. I have done a few workshops and hopefully, people will like my character." Alice Kaushik was cast as the elder version of Raavi Shah, opposite Dhillon. The role was previously portrayed by Jini Khan. Kaushik said, "I relate to this quality of Raavi a lot. She is almost always high on energy, she loves to keep her close ones happy. She is a ball of happiness, she is a magic wanting to explode. It's interesting that the whole of Raavi is a part of me."

Akshay Kharodia was cast as the elder versions of Dev Pandya, previously played by Jovian Fernandes, opposite Budharup. It marks his TV debut. Kharodia said, "I relate to Dev because I also come from a joint family and like Dev, I too keep family values as my priority." Simran Budharup was cast to portray Rishita Dwivedi opposite Kharodia. Budharup said, "I like the way Rishita is, she's blunt, outspoken and practical. I agree she's sometimes very rude, but that's fine." Mohit Parmar was cast as the elder versions of Krish Pandya, previously played by Swarnim Neema. It marks his acting debut, Parmar said, "Krish has taught me a lot as an actor, the experience is overwhelming and I have learned a lot." Kruttika Desai and Farukh Saeed were cast to portray Pandya parents, Suman and Darshan Pandya.

Pallavi Rao and Shrasti Maheshwari were cast as Pandya's and Raavi's relatives Prafulla Narayan and Anita Narang. Shyaam Makhecha was cast as Dhara's brother, Hardik Patel. Krunal Pandit and Mohit Sharma were cast as Pandya's relatives Jagat Narayan and Jignesh Narang. Vandana Vithlani, Vijay Badlani and Geetika Shyam were cast to play Rishita's family members, Kamini Thakkar, Janardhan and Kalyani Dwivedi. Devishi Madan was cast as Rishita's sister, Kirti Dwivedi opposite Parmar. Renu Pandey was cast as Suman's friend, Kanta Joshi. Ankita Sood played the role of Disha, opposite Dhillon and Jinal Jain played Raavi's friend Sneha Mittal.

In July 2022, Ankita Bahuguna was cast as Shweta Patel, opposite Parmar. Rajani Gupta and Sanjeev Sharma joined the show as Shweta's parents. In September 2022, Harttaj Gill was cast as Raavi's friend, Arnav, Riddhi Singh as Shweta's friend Forum and Nitin Sharma was cast as Deven, opposite Bahuguna. In November 2022, Amitesh Prasad replaced Sanjeev Sharma as Shweta's father.

In February 2022, Akshay Kharodia who portrays Dev, quit the show as he wanted to focus on his family. He later changed his decision and resumed shooting in May 2022. Akshay said,

"I had planned to quit the show, but now I have changed my decision. I will be taking a short break and will resume shooting for the show in May. My wife will deliver in April, so I will get a good amount of time to be with her and the baby."

Simran Budhraup received death and rape threats after her character, Rishita, turned negative in 2022. The actress revealed that she filed an FIR against the harassers. Budhraup said, "A group of young boys and girls would abuse and give rape threats. I initially ignored the threats as the character was bound to get disliked. But it went haywire when people started abusing, that's when I took a step and I went to the police station and lodged a complaint."

In September 2022, Pallavi Rao, who portrayed Prafulla, quit the show, due to her dates not being used and her diminished screen time. She said,

"My role as Prafulla mami was superb. I was very happy shooting for the show but then the track changed and the story moved on to the family members. My dates were not being used. After July, when my track with Shiva ended, I realised that it will be long before Prafulla is brought back, so I thought it was best to quit Pandya Store."

In January 2023, Vidhan Sharma, Raanav Sharma, Ronav Vaswani and Kiara Sadh were cast as Yashodhan, Shesh, Mithu and Sanchi respectively. The same month Maira Dharti Mehra was cast as Prerna opposite Parmar. In March 2023, Arjun Singh Shekhawat was cast as Pandyas and Raavi's cousin Shivank. Reekha Desai and Vinod Motwani joined the show as Prerna's parents. In May 2023, Heena Parmar was cast as Arushi, opposite Dhillon and Gayatri Soham was cast as Dhara's mother, Malti.

Priyanshi Yadav was cast as the elder version of Sanchi / Natasha, post the leap. Roshan Kapoor was cast as the elder version of Mithu and Harsh Mehta was cast as the elder version of Shesh. Rohit Chandel was cast as Dhawal Makwana opposite Yadav. Ankur Nayyar, Shabaaz Abdullah Badi and Abhishek Sharma were cast as Dhawal's brothers Amrish, Bhaven and Chirag respectively. Ananya Khare was cast as Amba, Makwana brother's mother. In the same month, Piyali Munshi, Deepika Upadhyay and Sayli Chaudhari were cast as Hetal, Pranali and Dolly opposite Nayyar, Badi and Sharma respectively.

In September 2023, Sahil Uppal was cast as the elder version of Yashodhan. In October 2023, Surabhi Das was cast as Makwana's sister Esha, opposite Uppal. In April 2024, Sahil Uppal, who portrayed Yashodhan and Surabhi Das, who portrayed Esha, quit the show. Both the actors stated "less screen space" as the reason.

In May 2024, Falaq Naaz replaced Piyali Munshi as Hetal. Hariti Joshi was cast as Natasha and Dhawal's daughter Naveli, while Vansh Sayani was cast as Golu, Hetal and Amrish's son. Sagar Parekh was cast as Shantanu, opposite Yadav.

=== Filming ===
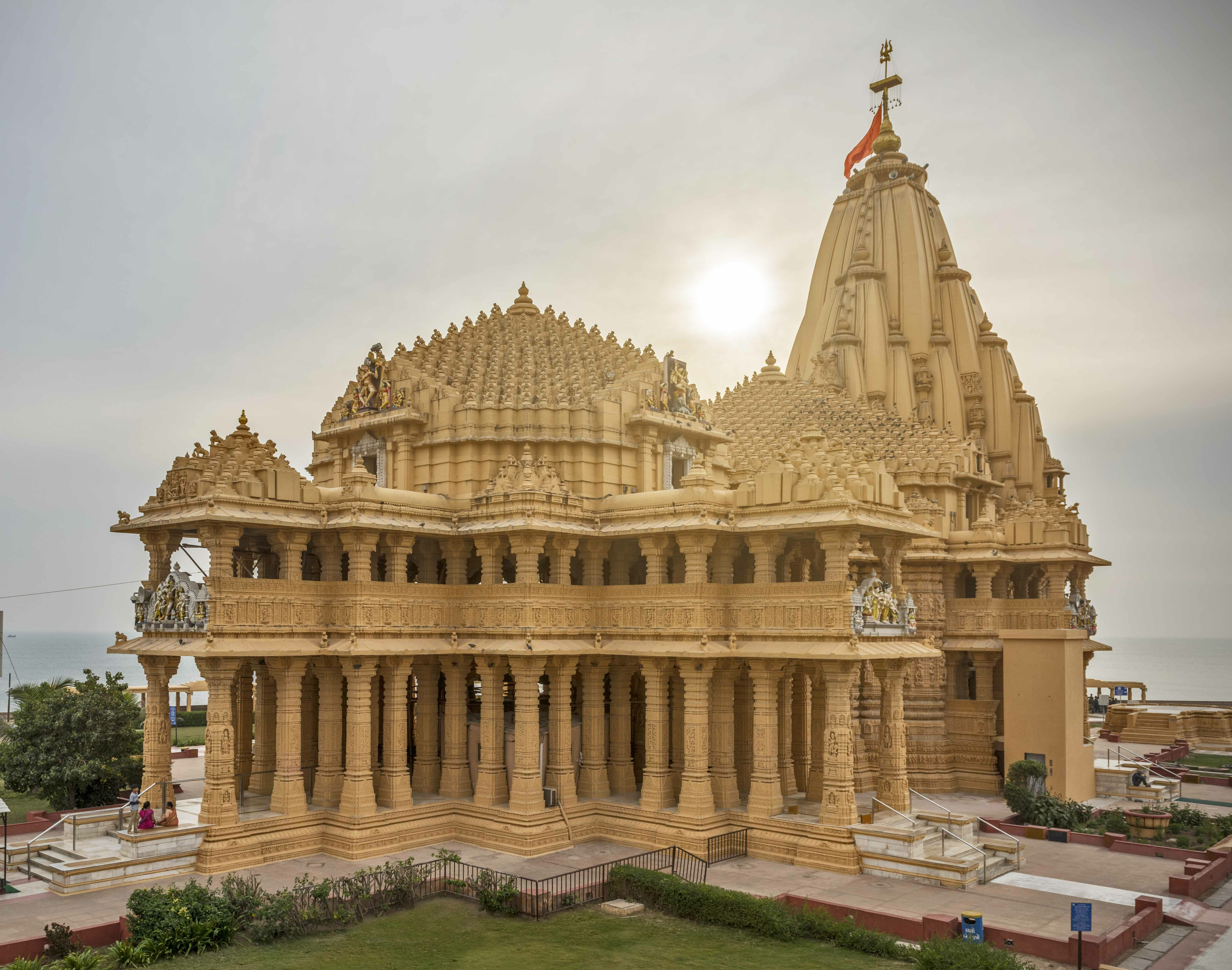
Filming location in Somnath

The series is set in Somnath, Gujarat. It is mainly shot at the Film City, Mumbai. Some initial sequences were shot in Somnath and at the Somnath Temple, Veraval. The team also shot some sequences in Bikaner including scenes at Junagarh Fort.

On 20 February 2021, a fire broke out on the set of the show. Some costumes and shoot material were burnt, but there were no fatalities.

On 13 April 2021, Uddhav Thackeray, Chief Minister of Maharashtra announced a sudden curfew due to increased Covid cases, while production halted in Mumbai from 14 April 2021.

The production location was soon shifted temporarily to Bikaner. The team shot at the Gajner Palace, during the lockdown and shoot halt in Mumbai. After two months of shooting in Bikaner, the team returned to Film City, Mumbai in June 2021.

In January 2022, Alice Kaushik, Akshay Kharodia, Simran Budharup and Mohit Parmar tested positive for COVID-19. Shooting of the show was stalled for sanitization. The storyline was revised accordingly, a pre-leap track was introduced with Harminder Singh, Jini Khan, Jovian Fernandes and Swarnim Neema rejoining the cast.

=== Release ===
The first promo of the show featured Kinshuk Mahajan and Shiny Doshi with the children. It was released by Star Plus and Disney+Hotstar on 8 January 2021.

In March 2021, a generation-leap promo was released, featuring Hina Khan, Ragini Khanna and Neelu Vaghela. They reprised their characters from Yeh Rishta Kya Kehlata Hai, Sasural Genda Phool and Diya Aur Baati Hum, respectively.

=== Broadcast ===
Pandya Store premiered on 25 January 2021 on Star Plus, replacing Lockdown Ki Love Story. It has aired in the United Kingdom on Utsav Plus with English subtitles since its premiere. From 21 April 2021, it replaced Shaadi Mubarak, which went off air abruptly due to COVID-19. Since 2 October 2022, Pandya Store was broadcast daily along with other Star Plus shows.

From 29 January to 2 February, Pandya Store broadcast special episodes, wherein two episodes were released each day.

=== Cancellation ===
Pandya Store went off air on 26 May 2024. Its timeslot was filled by Maati Se Bandhi Dor.

== Television specials ==
=== Pyar Ka Pehla Nasha (2021) ===
A special segment named Pyar Ka Pehla Nasha was aired on Star Plus on 19 December 2021. The segment was hosted by Raavi and Shiva. It featured the top ten romantic moments of the year 2021, starring couples of Star Plus's shows.

=== Ravivaar With Star Parivaar (2022) ===
The cast of Pandya Store participated as a team in the musical game show Ravivaar With Star Parivaar. The team competed with the teams of other Star Plus's shows. Pandya Store emerged as the third runner-up of the show.

== Reception ==
=== Critical reception ===
Pandya Store generally received positive reviews from the critics. Despite being a remake, the series has managed to bring freshness with its relatable story and performances. It is among the most watched Hindi GEC show.

== Adaptations ==
Pandya Store is an official adaptation of the Tamil series Pandian Stores. The show has previously been remade in Hindi as Gupta Brothers, that premiered on Star Bharat from 5 October 2020. The series went off-air the day after Pandya Store premiered on 25 January 2021.

== Soundtrack ==
Pandya Store Original Sound Track

Soundtrack album by Nakash Aziz and Sargam Jassu
- Released: 25 January 2021
- Genres: Romance; Soundtrack
- Length: 28:02
- Language: Hindi
- Label: Star India
- Producers: Sunjoy Waddhwa; Commal Waddhwa

Nakash Aziz and Sargam Jassu chronology
Bhaybheet (2020)	Pandya Store (2021)	Dhadkan Zindaggi Kii (2021)

Pandya Store's soundtrack is composed by Nakash Aziz and Sargam Jassu. The first song "Yaadon Ki Baarat", is an original track but its name is inspired from the 1973 film Yaadon Ki Baaraat's title song. It is the theme song of the show and is sung by Mukund Suryawanshi. The female version of the song is sung by Pamela Jain.

The second song "Ishq Ye Haaye Re" is an original track. It is the theme song of Gautam and Dhara. It is sung by Nakash Aziz. The third song "Rait Zara Si" from Atrangi Re, not an original track, is the theme song of Shiva and Raavi. It is sung by Arijit Singh and Shashaa Tirupati.

Pandya Store: Tracklisting
No.	Title	Artist	Length
1.	"Yaadon Ki Baarat" (Male)	Mukund Suryawanshi; Shubham Shirule	3:49
2.	"Yaadon Ki Baarat" (Female)	Pamela Jain	3:10
3.	"Yaadon Ki Baarat" (Duet)	Mukund Suryawanshi; Pamela Jain	4:56
4.	"Yaadon Ki Baarat" (Sad)	Pamela Jain	3:22
5.	"Yaadon Ki Baarat" (Version 2)	Mukund Suryawanshi; Pamela Jain	3:58
6.	"Ishq Ye Haaye Re" (Duet)	Nakash Aziz; Pamela Jain	3:01
7.	"Rait Zara Si" (Duet)	Arijit Singh; Shashaa Tirupati	4:51
8.	"Pandya Store" (Theme)	Nakash Aziz; Sargam Jassu	0:35
9.	"Shiva-Raavi" (Theme)	Nakash Aziz; Sargam Jassu	1:30

== Awards and nominations ==
Year	Award	Category	Recipient	Result	Ref.
2022	21st Indian Television Academy Awards	Best Actress (Drama)	Alice Kaushik	Nominated	
2022	21st Indian Television Academy Awards	Best Actor (Popular)	Kanwar Dhillon	Nominated	
2022	21st Indian Television Academy Awards	Best Serial (Popular)	Pandya Store	Nominated	
2022	22nd Indian Television Academy Awards	Popular Actress (Drama)	Alice Kaushik	Nominated	
2022	22nd Indian Television Academy Awards	Popular Actress (Drama)	Shiny Doshi	Nominated	
2022	22nd Indian Television Academy Awards	Popular Actor (Drama)	Kanwar Dhillon	Nominated	
2022	22nd Indian Television Academy Awards	Popular Actor (Drama)	Kinshuk Mahajan	Nominated	
2022	22nd Indian Television Academy Awards	Popular Serial (Drama)	Pandya Store	Nominated	
2023	22nd Indian Telly Awards	Best Actress in a Lead Role	Shiny Doshi	Nominated	
2023	22nd Indian Telly Awards	Fan Favourite Actress	Shiny Doshi	Nominated	
2023	22nd Indian Telly Awards	Best Actor in a Lead Role	Kinshuk Mahajan	Nominated	
2023	22nd Indian Telly Awards	Fan Favourite Actor	Kinshuk Mahajan	Nominated	
2023	22nd Indian Telly Awards	Best Actress in a Supporting Role	Alice Kaushik	Nominated	
2023	22nd Indian Telly Awards	Fan Favourite Supporting Actress	Alice Kaushik	Nominated	
2023	22nd Indian Telly Awards	Best Actress in a Supporting Role	Simran Budharup	Nominated	
2023	22nd Indian Telly Awards	Best Actor in a Supporting Role	Kanwar Dhillon	Nominated	
2023	22nd Indian Telly Awards	Fan Favourite Supporting Actor	Kanwar Dhillon	Nominated	
2023	22nd Indian Telly Awards	Best Actress in a Negative Role	Ankita Bahuguna	Nominated	
2023	22nd Indian Telly Awards	Fan Favourite Jodi	Kanwar Dhillon & Alice Kaushik	Nominated	
2023	22nd Indian Telly Awards	Best Director	Pradeep Yadav & Arshad Khan	Nominated	
2023	22nd Indian Telly Awards	Best Drama Series	Pandya Store	Nominated	
2023	22nd Indian Telly Awards	Fan Favourite Show	Pandya Store	Nominated	
2023	22nd Indian Telly Awards	Best Daily Serial	Pandya Store	Nominated	
2023	23rd Indian Television Academy Awards	Popular Actress (Drama)	Alice Kaushik	Nominated	
2023	23rd Indian Television Academy Awards	Popular Actress (Drama)	Shiny Doshi	Nominated	
2023	23rd Indian Television Academy Awards	Popular Actor (Drama)	Kanwar Dhillon	Nominated	
2023	23rd Indian Television Academy Awards	Popular Actor (Drama)	Kinshuk Mahajan	Nominated	
2023	23rd Indian Television Academy Awards	Best Actress in a Negative Role	Ananya Khare	Nominated	
2023	23rd Indian Television Academy Awards	Best Actor in a Negative Role	Ankur Nayyar	Nominated	
2023	23rd Indian Television Academy Awards	Popular Serial (Drama)	Pandya Store	Nominated	
2023	23rd Indian Television Academy Awards	Best Costume Designer	Tara Desai	Won	
2023	23rd Indian Television Academy Awards	Best Editor	Janak Chauhan	Won	

== See also ==
- List of programs broadcast by Star Plus
