= Karan Veer Mehra =

Indian actor (born 1980)

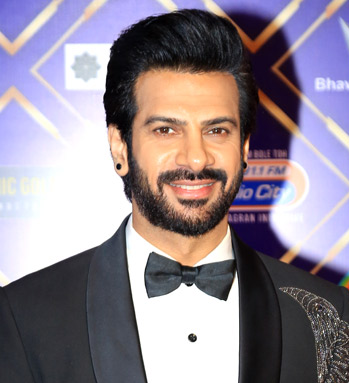
- Mehra in 2025
- Born: 28 December 1978 (age 47); Delhi, India
- Occupation: Actor
- Years active: 2005–present

Karan Veer Mehra is an Indian actor. He is best known for his role in the television serial Pavitra Rishta and for appearing in the Hindi film Ragini MMS 2. In 2024, he won Khatron Ke Khiladi 14 and Bigg Boss 18 in 2025.

== Early life ==
Karan Veer Mehra was born on 28 December 1978 in Delhi, India, to Rajeev Mehra and Ruchita Mehra, into a Punjabi family. He has a younger sister, Kamsin Mehra. He completed his schooling in Delhi and later pursued higher education at Delhi College of Arts and Commerce, University of Delhi. During his early years, he developed an interest in acting and theatre, which eventually led him to pursue a career in the entertainment industry.

== Personal life ==
Mehra has undergone leg surgery in the past following a serious injury, which required the insertion of a titanium plate. He has spoken about performing stunts despite the injury during his participation in one of the reality shows.

Mehra married his first spouse in 2009 at the age of 32; the couple divorced in 2018. On 21 January 2020, his second marriage took place during the COVID-19 pandemic, but the couple divorced after two years.

== Career ==
=== Television debut (2005–2006) ===
Mehra began his acting career with the youth-based show Remix in 2005, where he played the role of Aditya Sahani, marking his television debut. In the same year, he portrayed Soham Mehta in the college drama Saath Rahega Always.

Between 2007 and 2008, Mehra appeared in the soap opera Virrudh as Vedant Raisinghania, a wealthy and carefree young man. He later played the role of Karan Mehra, an aspiring director, in Star One's Pari Hoon Main opposite Rashami Desai. He made his Hindi film debut with Drona (2008) and also appeared in Aagey Se Right.

He was subsequently cast in Sony Entertainment Television's Hum Ladkiyan, where he played the love interest of the protagonist portrayed by Urmila Tiwari. In 2010, he played the antagonist Karan Rajvansh in the StarPlus soap opera Behenein.

In 2010, he portrayed a homosexual character named Harry in the LGBTQ short film Amen. He also made a brief appearance in the 2011 thriller No One Killed Jessica.

In 2013, Mehra gained wider recognition for playing Naren Karmarkar in Zee TV’s long-running series Pavitra Rishta opposite Ankita Lokhande.

During this period, he appeared in several Hindi films, including Bloody Isshq as Dr. Rahul, Mere Dad Ki Maruti as Raj, and Blood Money starring Kunal Khemu, where he played Inspector Bobby Kapadia. He also played a central role in the comedy film Badmashiyaan. In 2014, he appeared as Maddy in the erotic horror film Ragini MMS 2, directed by Bhushan Patel.

In 2015, he made an appearance in Zee TV’s miniseries Rishton Ka Mela opposite Sargun Mehta.

=== Later years and reality shows (2017–present) ===
In 2017, Mehra played television producer Rajeev Gupta in Sony SAB’s comedy series TV Biwi Aur Main, where he starred opposite Shruti Seth. He later transitioned to web series and OTT projects. In 2018, he appeared opposite Swara Bhasker in the Voot and JioCinema web series It's Not That Simple.

He also appeared in the SonyLIV series Heartbreak Hotel and made a cameo appearance in the ZEE5 action-crime thriller Poison 2.

Returning to television, he portrayed journalist Rohit Khanna in the comedy-drama Carry on Alia. He later appeared in Sony SAB’s Ziddi Dil Maane Na, Woh Toh Hai Albelaa, and Baatein Kuch Ankahee Si.

In 2024, he made a cameo appearance in Sony Entertainment Television’s thriller Pukaar - Dil Se Dil Tak.

In the same year, Mehra participated in the 14th season of Fear Factor: Khatron Ke Khiladi 14. He emerged as the winner of the season.

Later in 2024, he participated in the eighteenth season of Bigg Boss 18 and won the show.

On 26 May 2025, he was announced as the primary antagonist in director Omung Kumar’s action-romance film Silaa, alongside Harshvardhan Rane and Sadia Khateeb. The film went on floors on 1 July 2025.

== Awards and nominations ==
Year	Award	Category	Work	Result	Ref.
2017	Indian Television Academy Awards	Best Actor In A Comic Role	TV Biwi Aur Main	Nominated	
2025	Iconic Gold Awards	Most Influential Personality TV Male	Bigg Boss	Won	
2025	Pinkvilla Screen and Style Icons Awards	Most Stylish Reality Show Star - Male	Bigg Boss	Won	

== Filmography ==
=== Films ===
Year	Title	Role	Notes
2008	Pathan		
2008	Drona	Rajesh/Roger	
2009	Aage Se Right	Rocky	
2011	No One Killed Jessica	Model	Cameo
2012	Blood Money	Inspector Bobby Kapadia	
2012	Love Possible	Gaurav Jetlly	
2013	Bloody Isshq	Rahul	
2013	Mere Dad Ki Maruti	Raj	
2014	Ragini MMS 2	Maddy	
2015	Badmashiyaan	Pinkesh Kapoor	
2021	Choices	Tarun	Cameo
TBA	SILAA †	Zehraak	Filming

=== Television ===
Year	Title	Role	Notes
2005	Remix	Aditya Sahani	
2005	Saath Rahega Always	Soham Mehta	
2006	Sati...Satya Ki Shakti	Rajdeep Sikand	
2006	Twinkle Beauty Parlour Lajpat Nagar	Rocky	
2006	Shanno Ki Shaadi	Kunnu	
2006	Ssshhhh...Phir Koi Hai	Karan/Kunal/Sahdev	Episode 12/32
2007	Aahat	Sushant	Season 3, Episode 5
2007–2008	Virrudh	Vedant Raisinghania	
2008	Pari Hoon Main	Karan Mehra	
2008–2009	Hum Ladkiyan	Yuvraj Goel	
2009	Agle Janam Mohe Bitiya Hi Kijo	Ganesia Sardesai	
2010–2011	Behenein	Karan Rajvansh	
2011	Surya – The Super Cop	Inspector Rajhans	
2011	Bade Achhe Lagte Hain	Bhanu Shergill	
2012–2013	Amrit Manthan	Yug Prakashan Mehra	
2013–2014	Pavitra Rishta	Naren Karmarkar	
2015	Rishton Ka Mela	Karan Singh Gurjar	
2017	TV Biwi Aur Main	Rajeev Gupta	
2020	Carry On Alia	Rohit Khanna	
2021–2022	Ziddi Dil Maane Na	Abhay Mehra	
2022–2023	Woh Toh Hai Albelaa	Dr. Vikrant Desai	
2023–2024	Baatein Kuch Ankahee Si	Vaibhav Joshi	
2024	Pukaar – Dil Se Dil Tak	Gautam Rathore	
2024	Fear Factor: Khatron Ke Khiladi 14	Contestant	Winner
2024–2025	Bigg Boss 18	Contestant	Winner

=== Web series ===
Year	Title	Role	Notes
2010	Amen	Harry	Short film
2018	It's Not That Simple	Jayesh	
2019	Heartbreak Hotel	Rohit	Episode 2
2019	Lights Out	Bhaskar	Zee Theatre Play
2019	Sacred Games	Rajeev Chawla	Season 2
2020	Poison 2	Jaiveer	Cameo

=== Music video appearances ===
Year	Title	Singer(s)	Ref.
2020	"Aadat"	Aaman Trikha, Lizza Malik	
2024	"Kehna Galat Galat"	Jyoti Nooran, Javed–Mohsin	
