= Cyber Vaar =

2023 Indian crime thriller web series

- Also known as: Cyber Vaar
- Genre: Crime; Mystery; Thriller
- Screenplay by: Surabhi Saral; Dialogues; Surabhi Saral
- Story by: Nishant Chaturvedi
- Directed by: Ankush Bhatt
- Creative director: Harsh Samor
- Starring: Mohit Malik; Sanaya Irani
- Country of origin: English
- Original language: Hindi
- No. of seasons: 1
- No. of episodes: 20

Production
- Executive producer: Rizwan Ansari
- Production location: Mumbai
- Cinematography: Krishna
- Camera setup: Multi-camera
- Running time: 20 min approx.
- Production company: Ding Entertainment

Original release
- Network: Voot
- Release: 10 June – 19 August 2022

Cyber Vaar – Har Screen Crime Scene is an Indian crime thriller web series directed by Ankush Bhatt. Produced by Tanveer Bookwala under the banner of Ding Entertainment, it features Mohit Malik and Sanaya Irani. The series released 10 June 2022 on streaming platform Voot and has 20 episodes. It ended on 19 August 2022.

== Cast ==
=== Main ===
- Mohit Malik as ACP Akash Malik
- Sanaya Irani as Ananya Saini

=== Recurring ===
- Keshav Uppal as Tech Bro K
- Neha Khan as Asha
- Amitabh Ghanekar as Hau Sahib
- Indraneel Bhattacharya as Mr. Roy
- Abhinav Shukla as Vikram; Akash 's Childhood Friend
- Yuvika Chaudhary as Gauri;Ananya's Sister
- Ujjwal Gauraha as Pravin
- Naveen Saini
- Aashish Kaul
- Gavie Chahal
- Flora Saini
- Shivani Sopori

== Reception ==
Archika Khurana from The Times Of India rated the series 2.5 out of 5 and overall praised the lead actors Mohit Malik and Sanaya Irani of the series.

Neha Farheen from Aaj Tak shared her critical review stating that the story of the web series is average.
