= Mohit Malik =

Indian television actor (born 1983)

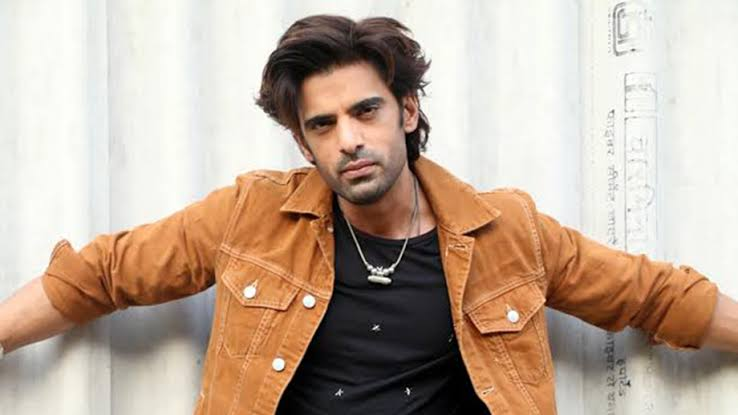
- Malik in 2019
- Born: 11 January 1983 (age 43); Delhi, India
- Occupation: Actor
- Years active: 2005–present
- Known for: Doli Armaano Ki; Kullfi Kumarr Bajewala
- Spouse: Addite Malik (m. 2010)
- Children: 1

Mohit Malik (born 11 January 1983) is an Indian actor who works in Hindi television and films. He is best known for his role of Samrat Singh Rathore in Doli Armaano Ki and Sikandar Singh Gill in Kullfi Kumarr Bajewala.

== Career ==
Malik made his television debut with TV show Miilee as Aaoni on Star Plus. After that he did various TV shows like Betiyaan Apni Ya Paraya Dhan, Pari Hoon Main, Banoo Main Teri Dulhann, Godh Bharaai, Durgesh Nandinii, Mann Kee Awaaz Pratigya and Phulwa. He was also the contestant of Nach Baliye 4. He has also done Suvreen Guggal – Topper of The Year as Rehan Charles.

He also worked in Doli Armaano Ki as Samrat Singh Rathore where his acting talent was appreciated the most. In 2015, Mohit Malik participated in Jhalak Dikhhla Jaa and got the third place. From June 2016 to Jan 2017 he hosted Savdhaan India. In 2018, Malik played a lead role in musical show Kullfi Kumarr Bajewala, as Sikandar Singh Gill, which broadcasts on Star Plus. In August 2020, he played the role of Dhruv Jaiswal in StarPlus's Lockdown Ki Love Story. In 2022 Malik Debut in Web Shows With Cyber Vaar - Har Screen Crime Scene on Voot and also participated in Khatron Ke Khiladi season 12 in which he was second runner up. In 2023, he played the lead role of Kunal Malhotra in Star Plus's show Baatein Kuch Ankahee Si Produced by Director's Kut Productions.

In 2025, Malik marked his bollywood debut with Azaad starring Ajay Devgan and Diana Penty with newcomers Rasha Thadani And Aman Devgan .

In October 2025, Malik played the role of Lord Shiva in Sony Sab series Gatha Shiv Parivaar Ki – Ganesh Kartikey later he quit the show due to his other work commitments like his upcoming movie release Mirzapur

In 2026, he played the role of Birju Lohar in Mirzapur.

== Personal life ==
Malik is a Punjabi.

Malik married actress Addite Shirwaikar in 2010. The couple has a son Ekbir, born 2021.

== Filmography ==
=== Television ===
| Year | Title | Role | Notes |
|---|---|---|---|
| 2005–2006 | Miilee | Aaoni | |
| 2006 | Jab Love Hua | Rahul Mittal | |
| 2006–2007 | Betiyaan Apni Ya Paraya Dhan | Viren | |
| 2007 | Durgesh Nandinii | Sikander | |
| 2008 | Pari Hoon Main | Rajveer Kapoor | |
| 2008 | Nach Baliye 4 | Contestant | 8th place |
| 2008–2009 | Banoo Main Teri Dulhann | Bharat Aniket Singh | |
| 2010 | Godh Bharaai | Bharat | |
| 2010 | Adaalat | Ankur Luthra | |
| 2011 | Surya The Super Cop | Amit | |
| 2012 | Mann Kee Awaaz Pratigya | Abhimanyu Singh | |
| 2011–2012 | Phulwa | Dr. Arjun Singh | |
| 2013 | Suvreen Guggal – Topper of The Year | Rehan Charles | |
| 2013–2015 | Doli Armaano Ki | Samrat Singh Rathore | |
| 2015 | Jhalak Dikhhla Jaa 8 | Contestant | 3rd runner-up |
| 2016–2017 | Savdhaan India | Host | |
| 2018–2020 | Kullfi Kumarr Bajewala | Sikandar Singh Gill | |
| 2020–2021 | Lockdown Ki Love Story | Dhruv Jaiswal | |
| 2022 | Fear Factor: Khatron Ke Khiladi 12 | Contestant | 2nd runner up |
| 2023–2024 | Baatein Kuch Ankahee Si | Kunal Malhotra | |
| 2025 | Ganesh Kartikey | Lord Shiva | |

=== Films ===
Key
| † | Denotes films that have not yet been released |

| Year | Title | Role | Notes | Ref. |
|---|---|---|---|---|
| 2025 | Azaad | Tez Bahadur | | |
| 2026 | Mirzapur | Birju Lohar | | |

=== Special appearances ===
| Year | Title | Role | Notes |
|---|---|---|---|
| 2006 | Ssshhhh...Phir Koi Hai | Dev | Episode 4 |
| 2014 | Kumkum Bhagya | Samrat Singh Rathore | |
| | Pavitra Rishta | | |
| 2019 | Khatra Khatra Khatra | Himself | |

=== Web series ===
| Year | Title | Role | Notes |
|---|---|---|---|
| 2022 | Cyber Vaar | ACP Akash Malik | |
| 2023–2025 | Chamak | Guru Deol | Season 1–2 |

== Awards and nominations ==
| Year | Award | Category | Work | Result | Ref. |
|---|---|---|---|---|---|
| 2014 | Gold Awards | Best Actor In A Negative Role (Male) | Doli Armaanon Ki | Won | |
| 2015 | Indian Television Academy Awards | Best Actor In A Negative Role (Male) | Doli Armaanon Ki | Won | |
| 2018 | Gold Awards | Best Actor in a Leading Role | Kullfi Kumarr Bajewala | Nominated | |
| 2018 | Gold Awards | Stellar Performance Of The Year | Kullfi Kumarr Bajewala | Won | |
| 2019 | Lions Gold Awards | Best Actor (Popular) | Kullfi Kumarr Bajewala | Nominated | |
| 2024 | Iconic Gold Awards | Best TV Actor | Baatein Kuch Ankahee Si | Won | |

== See also ==
- List of Indian television actors
