= Pradeep Yadav (director) =

Indian director

- Occupation: Director
- Years active: 2008–present
- Known for: Balika Vadhu; Pandya Store; Kullfi Kumarr Bajewala.

Pradeep Yadav is an Indian television director. He is best known for directing series including Balika Vadhu, Pandya Store and Kullfi Kumarr Bajewala.

== Career ==
Yadav started his career as an assistant director. Soon, he directed his first series Grihasti, in 2008. He got his big break with directing the popular series Balika Vadhu from 2008 to 2013. It won him various awards and nominations.

He next directed Kullfi Kumarr Bajewala from 2018 to 2020. From 2021 to 2022, Yadav directed the series Pandya Store and received nominations for his work. He also directed Balika Vadhu 2 from 2021 to 2022.

== Filmography ==
Year	Title	Network	Notes	Director
2008	Grihasti	Star Plus	Left in 2008	Yes
2008-2013	Balika Vadhu	Colors TV		Yes
2018-2020	Kullfi Kumarr Bajewala	Star Plus		Yes
2021-2022	Pandya Store	Star Plus	Left in 2022	Yes
2021-2022	Balika Vadhu	Colors TV & Voot		Yes

== Awards and nominations ==
Year	Award	Category	Work	Result	Ref.
2008	Gold Awards	Best Director	Balika Vadhu	Won	
2008	Indian Television Academy Awards	Best Director - Drama	Balika Vadhu	Won	
2009	Indian Television Academy Awards	Best Director - Drama	Balika Vadhu	Won	
2011	Star Guild Awards	Best Director TV – Fiction	Balika Vadhu	Nominated	
2012	Star Guild Awards	Best Director TV – Fiction	Balika Vadhu	Nominated	
2013	Star Guild Awards	Best Director TV – Fiction	Balika Vadhu	Nominated	
2018	Indian Television Academy Awards	Best Director - Drama	Kullfi Kumarr Bajewala	Nominated	
2022	Gold Awards	Best Director	Pandya Store	Pending	
