= Sargam Jassu =

Indian music composer

- Born: Rajasthan, India
- Occupations: Music composer, sound engineer
- Years active: 2002–present

Sargam Jassu in an Indian music composer. He, along with Nakash Aziz, won the Indian Television Academy Awards (2022) his work in Hindi television drama Anupamaa. He also won the same award in 2019 for Kullfi Kumarr Bajewala.

== Career ==
Jassu was born in Rajasthan. His father was a lyricist of devotional songs. He started his career as an assistant sound engineer in 2002. Previously, he worked as a trainee at Krishna Studios. His first film as a sound engineer was Main Hoon Na (2004).

In 1995, Jassu moved to Mumbai to pursue his career in music. In 2006, he met music composer Nakash Aziz. Jassu started his career as a music composer with a Hindi television series Chandragupta Maurya (2011). He has composed music for television series including Anupamaa, Yeh Rishta Kya Kehlata Hai, Faltu, and Pandya Store. Katha Ankahee and Woh Toh Hai Albelaa. He has also recreated Hindi song Chhaap Tilak for the web series Dark 7 White. He composed background score for ZEE5's Hindi film Badnaam Gali which was released on Zee 5.
