= Anjalie Gupta (disambiguation) =

Anjali Gupta (born 1993) is an Indian actress.

Anjalie/Anjali Gupta may also refer to:

- Anjali Gupta (born 1970), Indian flying officer
- Anjali Gupta, Indian television actress in, appeared in shows like Pehredaar Piya Ki, Yeh Rishta Kya Kehlata Hai, Nazar 2, Bhagyalakshmi etc
