= Miilee =

- Created by: Diamond Pictures
- Directed by: Sunand Kumar Baranwal; Raman Kumar; Abhishek Dudhaiya
- Starring: see below
- Theme music composer: Pritam
- Opening theme: "Miilee" by The cast and Sonu Nigam
- Country of origin: India
- No. of episodes: approx. 150

Production
- Executive producer: Akash Thakkar
- Producer: Vinta Nanda
- Running time: approx. 22 minutes

Original release
- Network: STAR Plus
- Release: 4 April 2005 – 8 June 2006

Miilee is an Indian Hindi television series broadcast on STAR Plus. The series is an Indian version of the popular Argentine telenovela Muñeca brava (also known as Wild Angel).

The series is set in the backdrop of Shimla.

== Overview ==
Miilee is the story of a young orphan girl, living in a convent in Shimla, who is brought to live in the Rastogi mansion as a househelp. Miilee is a very simple and carefree girl, adorable to all. She is a complete tomboy, an incorrigible prankster, and at the same time, a naive, sensitive and caring girl. She later discovers that the head of the Rastogi family is her biological father.

== Cast ==
- Mona Vasu as Miilee
- Ajay Gehi as Rahul Rastogi
- Kiran Kumar as Vishal Rastogi
- Aasif Sheikh as Sagar Malhotra
- Mahru Sheikh as Kamini Vishal Rastogi
- Mohit Malik as Aaoni: Miilee's love interest
- Imran Mashkoor Khan as Karan Malhotra
- Shonali Malhotra
- Addite Shirwaikar as Khushi
- Kiran Dubey
- Kanika Kohli as Ramona Rastogi
- Sushma Seth as Mrs. Rastogi
- Shagufta Ali as Madhubala
- Shabnam Sayed as Rastogi Family's Maid
- Rajeev Verma as Father Manuel
- Vineet Kumar as Heeralal

== Reception ==
The series opened with a rating of 10.67 TVR with an overall rating of 9.2 TVR in that week.
