= List of programmes broadcast by StarPlus =

This is a list of the current and formerly broadcast series on the Indian television channel, StarPlus.

== Current broadcast ==
Premiere date	Show
12 January 2009	Yeh Rishta Kya Kehlata Hai
13 July 2020	Anupamaa
12 March 2024	Udne Ki Aasha
20 March 2026	Kyunki Rishton Ke Bhi Roop Badalte Hain
20 April 2026	Oh Humnava Tum Dena Saath Mera
5 August 2026	Yeh Fitoor Tera
19 September 2026	India Ke Top 1%
23 September 2026	Sayoneee
21 October 2026	Apsara

== Former broadcast ==
=== Acquired series ===
Year	Show
1998	Chandrakanta
2001–2002	Chhupa Rustam
2020	Devon Ke Dev...Mahadev
2012	Gumrah: End of Innocence
2001	The Helen Show
2020	Hostages
2001–2002	Kabhii Sautan Kabhii Sahelii
2001	Kavita
2001	Kundali
2002–2004; 2020	Ramayan
2020	RadhaKrishn
2002	Sea Hawks
2002–2004	Shanti
2020	Shree Ganesh
1998	Swabhimaan

=== Anthology series ===
Year	Show
2014	Ishq Kills
2001–2002	Kahaani Jurm Ki
1999–2000	Star Bestsellers
2018	Teen Paheliyan
2012	Teri Meri Love Stories

=== Children/teen series ===
Year	Show
2005	Akkad Bakkad Bambey Bo
2006–2007	Antariksh — Ek Amar Gatha
2004	Bachcha Party
1998	Eek! The Cat Storyteller
2003–2004	Gharwali Uparwali Aur Sunny
2006–2007	Golu Ke Goggles
2003–2004	Hatim
2003–2004	Karishma Kaa Karishma
2004–2005	Kabhi Khushi Kabhi Dhoom
2002–2004	Kyun Hota Hai Pyarrr
2004–2005	Princess Dollie Aur Uska Magic Bag.
2014–2015	Nisha Aur Uske Cousins
2002–2004	Shaka Laka Boom Boom
2003–2006	Shararat
2000–2004	Son Pari

=== Comedy series ===
Year	Show
2006–2008	Aek Chabhi Hai Padoss Mein
2022	Anandibaa Aur Emily
2021; 2022	Bingo Comedy Adda
2009	Burey Bhi Hum Bhale Bhi Hum
1999	Chhoti Si Baat
2012	Ek Doosre Se Karte Hain Pyaar Hum
2000–2003	Gharwali Uparwali
2000	Hasna Mat
2018	Har Shaakh Pe Ullu Baithaa Hai
1999	Hera Pheri
2001–2003	Hum Saath Aath Hain
2001	Ji Mantriji
2000–2001	Kabhi-Kabhie Mere Ghar Mein Bhuchal Aata Hai
2002–2004	Khichdi
2018	Khichdi Season 2
2000	Life Nahin Hai Ladoo
2005	LOC — Life Out of Control
2020	Maharaj Ki Jai Ho!
2015	On Air with AIB
2011	Pyaar Mein Twist
2003	Samnewali Khidki
2000	Sewalal Mewalal
2005–2006	Shanno Ki Shaadi
2015–2016	Sumit Sambhal Lega
2014–2015	Tu Mera Hero
1996–2000	Tu Tu Main Main
1999	Wagle Ki Nayi Duniya
2000	Zara Hatke Zara Bachke

=== Drama series ===
Year	Show	Notes
2024	Aankh Micholi	
2021	Aapki Nazron Ne Samjha	
2017	Aarambh: Kahaani Devsena Ki	
2000	Aatish	
2024–2026	Advocate Anjali Awasthi	
2014–2015	Airlines	
2000	Antaral	
2012–2014	Arjun	
2002	Asoka: The Series	
1999	Aur Phir Ek Din	
2002–2003	Avinash I.P.S	
2005–2010	Baa Bahoo Aur Baby	
2023–2024	Baatein Kuch Ankahee Si	
2022–2023	Banni Chow Home Delivery	
2010–2011	Behenein	
2002–2008	Bhabhi	
2010–2011	Chand Chupa Badal Mein	
2016–2017	Chandra Nandini	
2023	Chashni	
2009	Chehra	
2021–2022	Chikoo – Yeh Ishq Nachaye	
2020	Dadi Amma... Dadi Amma Maan Jaao!	
2016	Dahleez	
2024–2025	Deewaniyat	
2004–2005	Dekho Magar Pyaar Se	
2001–2005	Des Mein Niklla Hoga Chand	
2006–2009	Dharti Ka Veer Yodha Prithviraj Chauhan	
2017	Dhhai Kilo Prem	
2017	Dil Boley Oberoi	
2020	Dil Jaise Dhadke... Dhadakne Do	
2024–2025	Dil Ko Tumse Pyaar Hua	
2017–2018	Dil Sambhal Jaa Zara	
2019	Dil Toh Happy Hai Ji	
2011–2016	Diya Aur Baati Hum	
2024	Do Dooni Pyaar	
2015	Dosti... Yaariyan... Manmarziyan	
2017	Ek Aastha Aisi Bhee	
2019	Ek Bhram Sarvagun Sampanna	
2013–2014	Ek Ghar Banaunga	
2014	Ek Hasina Thi	
2011–2013	Ek Hazaaron Mein Meri Behna Hai	
2013–2014	Ek Nanad Ki Khushiyon Ki Chaabi – Meri Bhabhi	
2012–2015	Ek Veer Ki Ardaas...Veera	
2014–2015	Everest	
2022–2023	Faltu	
1999	Gaatha	
2020–2025	Ghum Hai Kisikey Pyaar Meiin	
2008–2009	Grihasti	
2015	Gulmohar Grand	
2008–2012	Hamari Devrani	
2016	Humko Tumse Ho Gaya Hai Pyaar Kya Karein?	
2017–2018	Ikyawann	
2020–2024	Imlie	
2025	Ishani	
2016–2019	Ishqbaaaz	
2024–2025	Iss Ishq Ka Rabb Rakha	
2011–2012	Iss Pyaar Ko Kya Naam Doon?	
2013–2015	Iss Pyaar Ko Kya Naam Doon? Ek Baar Phir	
2017	Iss Pyaar Ko Kya Naam Doon 3	
2016–2017	Jaana Na Dil Se Door	
2008–2009	Jahan Pe Basera Ho	
2003	Jai Mata Di	
2001–2002	Jannat	
2003–2004	Jeet	
2023–2026	Jhanak	
2003	Josh	
2004–2006	K. Street Pali Hill	
2001–2004	Kaahin Kissii Roz	
2010–2011	Kaali – Ek Agnipariksha	
2011–2012	Kaali – Ek Punar Avatar	
2001–2003	Kabhi Aaye Na Judaai	
2022	Kabhi Kabhie Ittefaq Sey	
2025	Kabhi Neem Neem Kabhi Shahad Shahad	
1997	Kabhie Kabhie	
2019–2020	Kahaan Hum Kahaan Tum	
2000–2008	Kahaani Ghar Ghar Kii	
2003–2007	Kahiin to Hoga	
2001	Kangan	
2006–2009	Karam Apnaa Apnaa	
2004–2005	Karma	
2001–2008	Kasautii Zindagii Kay	
2018–2020	Kasautii Zindagii Kay 2	
2003	Kashmeer	
2007–2009	Kasturi	
2007–2009	Kayamath	
2023	Keh Doon Tumhein	
2002–2005	Kehta Hai Dil	
2004–2007	Kesar	
2008–2010	Kis Desh Mein Hai Meraa Dil	
2005–2006	Kkavyanjali	
2017	Koi Laut Ke Aaya Hai	
2004	Koie Jane Na	
1998–1999	Kora Kagaz	
2002–2004	Krishna Arjun	
2018–2019	Krishna Chali London	
2015–2016	Kuch Toh Hai Tere Mere Darmiyaan	
2018–2020	Kullfi Kumarr Bajewala	
2002–2009	Kumkum – Ek Pyara Sa Bandhan	
2017	Kya Qusoor Hai Amala Ka?	
2000–2008	Kyunki Saas Bhi Kabhi Bahu Thi	
2025–2026	Kyunki Saas Bhi Kabhi Bahu Thi 2	
2020–2021	Lockdown Ki Love Story	
2017	Love Ka Hai Intezaar	
2011	Love U Zindagi	
2006	Lucky	
2025–2026	Maana Ke Hum Yaar Nahi	
2024–2025	Maati Se Bandhi Dor	
2011	Maayke Se Bandhi Dor	
1999	Main	
2009–2012	Mann Kee Awaaz Pratigya	
2018–2019	Mariam Khan – Reporting Live	
1998	Manzil	
2010–2011	Maryada: Lekin Kab Tak?	
2024	Meetha Khatta Pyaar Hamara	
2021	Mehndi Hai Rachne Waali	
2015–2017	Mere Angne Mein	
2007–2008	Meri Awaz Ko Mil Gayi Roshni	
2017–2018	Meri Durga	
2005–2006	Miilee	
2009–2010	Mitwa Phool Kamal Ke	
2015–2016	Mohi...Ek Khwab Ke Khilne Ki Kahani	
2026	Mr. and Mrs. Parshuram	
2012–2013	Mujhse Kuchh Kehti...Yeh Khamoshiyaan	
2016–2018	Naamkarann	
2011–2012	Navya..Naye Dhadkan Naye Sawaal	
1999	Pal Chhin	
2021–2024	Pandya Store	
2016–2017	Pardes Mein Hai Mera Dil	
2015	Phir Bhi Na Maane...Badtameez Dil	
2025	Pocket Mein Aasman	
2016–2017	P.O.W. – Bandi Yuddh Ke	
2014–2015	Private Investigator	
2012–2014	Pyaar Ka Dard Hai Meetha Meetha Pyaara Pyaara	
2006	Pyaar Ke Do Naam: Ek Raadha, Ek Shyaam	
2000	Rajdhani	
2008–2010	Raja Ki Aayegi Baraat	
2022–2023	Rajjo	
2011–2012	Ruk Jaana Nahin	
2017–2018	Rishton Ka Chakravyuh	
2021	Rudrakaal	
1998–1999	Saans	
2003–2004	Saara Akaash	
2004–2008	Saarrthi	
2010–2017	Saath Nibhaana Saathiya	
2020–2022	Saath Nibhaana Saathiya 2	
2009–2011	Sabki Laadli Bebo	
1998–1999	Saboot	
2026	Sairaab	
2009–2010	Sajan Ghar Jaana Hai	
2012	Sajda Tere Pyaar Mein	
2025	Sampoorna	
2007–2009	Sangam	
2002–2005	Sanjivani	
2019–2020	Sanjivani	
2001	Sanskruti	
2007–2009	Santaan	
2007–2010	Sapna Babul Ka... Bidaai	
2010–2012	Sapnon Se Bhare Naina	
2013–2014	Saraswatichandra	
2010–2012	Sasural Genda Phool	
2020–2021	Shaadi Mubarak	
2001–2004	Shagun	
2009	Shaurya Aur Suhani	
2020–2021	Shaurya Aur Anokhi Ki Kahani	
2025–2026	Shehzaadi... Hai Tu Dil Ki	
2009–2010	Shraddha	
2016	Silsila Pyaar Ka	
2000	Siski	
2014–2017	Suhani Si Ek Ladki	
1996–2001	Surabhi	
2026	Taara	
2016	Tamanna	
1999	Tanha	
2010–2011	Tere Liye	
2009–2011	Tere Mere Sapne	
2015	Tere Sheher Mein	
2023–2024	Teri Meri Doriyaann	
2006–2007	Thodi Si Zameen Thoda Sa Aasmaan	
2023	Titli	
2026	Tod Kar Dil Mera	
2017–2018	Tu Sooraj Main Saanjh, Piyaji	
2008–2010	Tujh Sang Preet Lagai Sajna	
2025	Tu Dhadkan Main Dil	
2021–2022	Vidrohi	
2006–2007	Viraasat	
1998	Wajood	
2019–2024	Yeh Hai Chahatein	
2013–2019	Yeh Hai Mohabbatein	
1997–1998	Yeh Hai Raaz	
2022	Yeh Jhuki Jhuki Si Nazar	
2019–2020	Yeh Rishtey Hain Pyaar Ke	
1999–2000	Zindagi	
2010–2011	Zindagi Ka Har Rang... Gulaal	
2021–2022	Zindagi Mere Ghar Aana	

=== Supernatural series ===
Year	Show	Notes
2019–2020	Divya Drishti	
2025	Jaadu Teri Nazar – Daayan Ka Mausam	
2004-2005	Karma	
2018–2020	Nazar	
2020	Nazar 2	
2018–2019	Qayamat Ki Raat	
2001–2004	Ssshhhh...Koi Hai	
2003–2004	Vikraal Aur Gabraal	
2019–2020	Yehh Jadu Hai Jinn Ka!	

=== Mythological series ===
Year	Show	Notes
2007–2008	Jai Maa Durga	
2018–2019	Karn Sangini	
2001–2002	Maa Shakti	
2013–2014	Mahabharat	
2025–2026	Mahabharat - Ek Dharmayudh	
2019	Namah Lakshmi Narayan	
2004–2006	Sai Baba	
2015–2016	Siya Ke Ram	

=== International series ===
- Dynasty (1981 TV series) (1991)
- The Bold and the Beautiful (1991)
- Hill Street Blues (1991)
- The Flying Doctors (1991)
- M*A*S*H (TV series) (1991)
- The Oprah Winfrey Show (1991)
- Dallas (TV series) (1991)
- Perfect Scoundrels (1991)
- A Touch of Frost (1996)
- Dracula: The Series (1996)
- Allo Allo
- Agatha Christie's Poirot (1998)
- Picket Fences (1996)
- Doogie Howser, M.D. (1992)
- Beyond 2000 (1992)
- Empty Nest (1996)
- Street Legal (Canadian TV series) (1993)
- The New Statesman (1987 TV series) (1993)
- L.A. Law (199x)
- Baywatch Nights (199x)
- Are You Being Served?
- Chicago Hope (199x)
- The Fall Guy (1993)
- Yes Minister (1997)
- Yes Prime Minister (1998)
- The Bill (1995)
- Lonesome Dove(miniseries) (1993)
- Due South (1997)
- CODE 3 (1996)
- Aerobics Oz Style (1994)
- The Henderson Kids (1994)
- 3rd Rock from the Sun (1998)
- The Golden Girls (1996)
- The Extraordinary (1995/1996]
- The X Files (1995/1996)
- NYPD Blue (1996)
- House of Cards (British TV series) (1997)
- World's Wildest Police Videos (1998)
- Time Trax (1995)
- Star Trek: Deep Space Nine (1995)
- Vegas (1978 TV series) (1998)
- Full House (1995)
- Dr. Quinn, Medicine Woman (1995)
- Rescue 911 (1995)
- Fantasy Island (1998)
- Newhart
- Rescue 911 (1995)
- Baywatch (1997)
- The Crystal Maze (1994)
- The Good Life (1998)
- Maria La Del Barrio (1998)
- Mind Your Language (1997–1998)
- Murder, She Wrote (1997–1998)
- Rage of Angels (1992–1993) (1993)
- Remington Steele
- Riviera (1993)
- Santa Barbara (1992–1994)
- Small Wonder (1997–2004)
- The Wonder Years (1992–1996)

==== Animated series ====
- Denver the Last Dinosaur (1998)
- Saber Rider and the Star Sheriffs (1998)
- Bobby's World (2001)
- Bonkers (2009)
- The Book of Pooh (2009)
- The Simpsons (1994)
- The Buzz on Maggie (2005–2006)
- Dennis the Menace (2001–2003)
- House of Mouse (2008)
- Dungeons & Dragons (2001–2003)
- Eek! The Cat (2001–2004)
- Fantastic Four (2001–2004)
- Fillmore! (2008–2009)
- Iron Man (2001–2004)
- Kim Possible (2005–2006)
- Lilo & Stitch (2008–2009)
- Little Einsteins (2008)
- Mickey Mouse Clubhouse (2008)
- The New Adventures of Winnie the Pooh (2008)
- RoboCop: The Animated Series (2001–2004)
- Samurai Pizza Cats (2001)
- Silver Surfer (2001–2004)
- Super V (2019–2020)
- TaleSpin (2005–2006)
- The Tick (2001–2002)
- Timon & Pumbaa (2005–2006)

=== Reality/unscripted programming ===
Year	Show	Notes
2020	5 Star Kitchen ITC Chef's Special	
2015–2016	Aaj Ki Raat Hai Zindagi	
2008–2011	Aap Ki Kachehri	
1996–1999	Amul India Show	
2007	Antakshari – The Great Challenge	
2009	Arre Deewano Mujhe Pehchano	
1997	Bakeman's Ooh La La	
2002	Bol Baby Bol	
2008	Chala Change Ka Chakkar	
2011	Chef Pankaj Ka Zayka	
2008–2010	Chhote Ustaad	
2011	Comedy Ka Maha Muqabala	
2017	Dance Champions	
2015–2024	Dance Plus	
2017–2018	Dil Hai Hindustani	
2008	Diwali Rishton Kii	
1997–1998	Ek Do Teen	
2000	Fast Track	
2017	Golden Divas Baatein With Badshah	
2017	The Great Indian Laughter Challenge 5	
2002	Gurukul	
2003	Hai Na Bolo Bolo	
1996	India Business Week	
2013	India's Dancing Superstar	
2018	India's Next Superstars	
2014	India's Raw Star	
2019	The Indian Express: 26/11 Stories of Strength	
2003–2004	Jadoo	
2007	Jodee Kamaal Ki	
2011	Jeele Ye Pal	
2013	Junior Masterchef Swaad Ke Ustaad	
2011	Just Dance	
2005–2006	Kaboom	
2008	Kaho Na Yaar Hai	
2002	Kamzor Kadi Kaun	
2000–2007	Kaun Banega Crorepati	
2009	Khelo Jeeto Jiyo	
2001–2005	Khullja Sim Sim	
1998	The Kiran Joneja Show	
2002	Kismey Kitnaa Hai Dum	
2003	Kuch Kar Dikhana Hai	
1998	Kudratnama	
2008	Kya Aap Paanchvi Pass Se Tez Hain?	
2001–2002	Kya Masti Kya Dhuum	
2017	Lip Sing Battle	
2014	Mad in India	
2010	Mahayatra – Rishton Ka Anokha Safar	
2010–2020	MasterChef India – Hindi	
2006	Mera Star Superstar	
1996–1997	Meri Awaaz Suno	
2000	Meri Saheli	
2009–2010	Mind Games – Baazi Dimag Ki	
2000–2002	Mirch Masala	
2005	Mum Tum Aur Hum	
2009	Mummy Ke Superstars	
2001–2004	Musafir Hoon Yaaron	
2009–2010	Music Ka Maha Muqqabla	
2007–2019	Nach Baliye	
2013	Nach Baliye Shriman v/s Shrimati	
2022	Naam Reh Jaayega	
1995	Nikki Tonight	
2009	Perfect Bride	
2022	Ravivaar With Star Parivaar	
1997–2002	Rendezvous With Simi Garewal	
1996	The Road Show	
2017	Sabse Smart Kaun?	
2009	Sacch Ka Saamna	
2012–2014	Satyamev Jayate	
1999	Shotgun Show	
1998	So Let's Yahoo	
2002	Smart Jodi	
2000	Star Sunday Lunch	
2009	Star Vivaah	
2007–2010	Star Voice of India	
2003–2004	Sunday Tango	
2012	Survivor India	
2020–2021	Taare Zameen Par	
2017, 2019	TED Talks India Nayi Soch	
2009	Tere Mere Beach Mein	
1996–2005	V People	
2009	Voice of India – Mummy Ke Superstars	
2011	Wife Bina Life	
1998	Without Malice	
2002–2003	Yatra	
2024	Yeh Teej Badi Hai Mast Mast	
2010	Zara Nachke Dikha	

=== Television films ===
- Humko Ishq Ne Maara (1997)
