= Karthika Deepam (Telugu TV series) =

2017 Indian Telugu drama TV series

- Genre: Drama; Family; Thriller
- Developed by: Pradeep Panicker
- Written by: Padmini Nadella; Nandhana Nadella; Saul Shahjahan
- Starring: Nirupam Paritala; Premi Viswanath; Shoba Shetty
- Opening theme: "Aaraneekumaaye Deepam ... Karthika Deepam"
- Country of origin: India
- Original language: Telugu
- No. of seasons: 2
- No. of episodes: 2279 [Both season]

Production
- Producers: Gutta Venkatesh (Season 1); Bharathi (Season 2)
- Editor: Phani Bhat
- Camera setup: Multi-camera
- Running time: 22 minutes
- Production companies: Gagan Tele Show (season 1); Sandalwood Media (season 2)

Original release
- Network: Star Maa
- Release: 16 October 2017 – present

Related
- Karuthamuthu; Chellamma

Karthika Deepam is an Indian Telugu-language television series that airs on Star Maa. The series consists of two seasons. The first season, which premiered on 16 October 2017 and concluded on 23 January 2023, is a remake of the Malayalam television series Karuthamuthu, originally broadcast on Asianet.

The second season, titled Karthika Deepam II – Idi Nava Vasantham, premiered on 25 March 2024 and is a remake of the Tamil television series Chellamma, which airs on Star Vijay.

== Series overview ==
Season	No.of episodes	Original broadcast	
Season	No.of episodes	First aired	Last aired
1	1569	16 October 2017	23 January 2023
2	700	25 March 2024	present

== Plot ==
=== Season 1 ===
Karthik, a doctor, begins to fall in love with his friend Deepa, admiring her kindness and generosity. Karthik's brother, Aditya, falls in love with Deepa's half-sister, Shravya. Aditya and Karthik's mother, Soundarya, arranges with Shravya's parents for Aditya and Shravya's wedding. Shravya is initially happy, believing that her marriage is arranged with Karthik. However, when she discovers she is to marry Aditya, she threatens to commit suicide.

Meanwhile, Karthik arranges to marry Deepa, but Deepa's parents are unsure. The couple marry in secret and announce their marriage at a party, angering Soundarya and Shravya. Aditya and Shravya marry but she is unhappy.

Some time later, Karthik's childhood friend Mounitha returns, and she tries to steal him from Deepa. Mounitha causes Shravya to miscarry, and falsely convinces Karthik that Deepa is having an affair with her friend, the novelist Vihari. Deepa becomes pregnant and is finally accepted by Soundarya. It is also revealed that Mounitha was responsible for the death of Hima, Karthik's college girlfriend.

Karthik takes a fertility test, but Mounitha alters the test to make Karthik think that he is infertile. She botches several attempts to have Deepa killed, and hires Durga to kill Deepa. After seeing Deepa's kindness, however, Durga protects her. Mounitha then unsuccessfully tries to have them killed in a car accident. Durga reveals his truth to Deepa, but because he is in love with Monitha, he blames Karthik for the attempted murders. Karthik, believing he is infertile, tells Deepa that he is not the father of her child, and thinks that Vihari is the father. Deepa leaves, Karthik's father and brother ask him to be retested, but Mounitha convinces him not to do so.

Deepa gets a job at a petrol station. Vihari explains to Soundarya about his brother-sister relationship with Deepa and proves that he did not have an affair with her. Soundarya feels guilty for misunderstanding Deepa and asks her to return, but she refuses. Later, Deepa gives birth to twins while under anaesthetic, and Soundarya takes one home without Deepa knowing there was a second child. Karthik begins to love the child, and names her Hima after his late girlfriend. Deepa leaves the city with her other child, Souurya.

Deepa runs a tailor shop in a small village with Souurya. The two travel to the city for medical treatment, where Deepa encounters Karthik and his family. A misunderstanding occurs where Deepa thinks that Karthik has married Mounitha.

Deepa begins working as a cook, and gets a job cooking in Hima's school. The two become friends, not knowing that they are mother and daughter. When Karthik finds out about their friendship, he is furious, and decides to take Hima away to America. However, Hima becomes sick and is unable to travel. Karthik and Deepa talk; Deepa finds out that Hima is her other unknown child, and Karthik finds out that Souurya is Deepa's daughter. For the sake of the children, Karthik and Deepa move back in together. Souurya learns that Karthik is her father.

== Cast ==
=== Season 1 ===
==== Main ====
- Premi Viswanath as Deepa "Vantalakka" Muralikrishna Karthik: A cook; Muralikrishna's daughter; (2017–2023)
- Nirupam Paritala as Dr. Karthik Anandrao aka Doctor Babu: A cardiologist; Soundarya and Anandrao's elder son; (2017–2023)
- Shoba Shetty as Dr. Mounitha: A gynaecologist; Karthik's obsessive one-sided lover; (2017-2023)

==== Supporting ====
- Sahruda as Hima Karthik: Karthik and Deepa's younger daughter and Souurya's twin sister (2018–2023)
  - Keerthi Bhat as Adult Hima Karthik (2022)
- Krithika as Souurya "Jwala" Karthik: Karthik and Deepa's elder daughter; (2018–2023)
  - Amulya Gowda as Adult Souurya Karthik (2022)
- Archana Ananth as Soundarya Anandarao: Anandrao's wife; (2017–2023)
- Gadiraju Arun Kumar as Anandarao: Soundarya's husband; (2017–2023)
- Manas Nagulapalli as Dr. Nirupam Satyam: Swapna and Satyam's elder son; (2022)
  - Tanav as Child Nirupam Satyam (2021-2022)
- Manoj Kumar as Prem Satyam: Swapna and Satyam's younger son; (2022)
  - Sathwik as Child Prem Satyam (2021-2022)

==== Recurring ====
- Sowjanya Gandi as Dr. Charuseela: Mounitha's best friend; (2022-2023)
- Bhavani Chowdary as Shoba Devi: Nirupam's friend and one-sided lover; (2022)
- Sri Rithika / Sushma Kiron as Swapna Anandrao Satyam: Soundarya and Anandrao's daughter; (2017–2018; 2021) / (2022)
- Chinni Krishna as Satyam: Swapna's husband; (2022)
- Vaibhav Surya as Indrudu: Souurya's adoptive father; (2022–2023)
- Rajitha / Jahnavi as Chandramma: Souurya's adoptive mother; (2022–2023)
- Yashwant as Aditya Anandrao: Soundarya and Anandrao's younger son; (2017-2022)
- Sangeetha Kamath / Niharika as Shravya Muralikrishna Aditya: Muralikrishna and Bhagyam's daughter; (2017–2020) / (2020–2022)
- Unknown as Anand aka Rava Idli: Mounitha's surrogate son (2022–2023)
- Srinivas as Varanasi: Deepa's namesake brother in chawl (2018–present)
- Shiva Parvathi as Rajalakshmi: Village head in Sangharati; Dr. Hemachandra's aunt (2022–2023)
- Sasidhar as Dr. Hemachandra: Deepa's doctor and namesake brother (2022-2023)
- Unknown as Shiva: Mounitha's driver and assistant (2022–2023)
- Tenali Shakuntala as Dr. Hemachandra's mother (2022–2023)
- Narasimha Reddy as Durga: Contract killer; Deepa's namesake brother; (2018; 2021; 2022)
- Jyothi Reddy as ACP Roshini: Police officer who investigated Deepa's missing case and Mounitha's murder case (2018; 2021; 2022)
- Uma Devi as Bhagyalakshmi "Bhagyam" Muralikrishna: Muralikrishna's second wife; (2017-2022; 2023)
- Sri Divya as Priyamani: Mounitha's maid and helper (2020-2021)
- Bhavana Reddy as Rudrani: A money-lender who clashed with Deepa in Thatikonda (2021)
- Ashok Rao as Muralikrishna: Bhagyam's husband; (2017-2022)
- Venugopal as Vihari: Tulasi's husband; (2018; 2021)
- Seetha Mahalakshmi as Tulasi Vihari: Vihari's wife; (2018-2021)
- Lahari Vishnuwazhala as Hima: Karthik's college love interest (Dead)
- Bhavani Chowdary as Shoba Devi: Nirupam's friend and one-sided lover; (2022–present)
- Yashvi Kanakala as Srilatha: Monitha's friend and helper (2018)
- Ayesha as Malathi: Soundarya's domestic help (2017-2021)
- Bharadwaz Kundurthi as Anji: Soundarya's driver; (2021)
- Dhana Lakshmi as Saroja: Deepa's namesake sister in chawl (2018-2022)
- Lucky Sree as Dr. Bharathi: Karthik and Mounitha's friend (2021-2022)
- Bhagya Sree as Constable Ratna Sita: Mounitha's compulsive helper; (2021)
- Vijaya as Sr Hima's mother (2020-2021)
- Sirisha Sougandh as Judge for Karthik and Deepa's divorce trials (2019)
- Radha Prashanthi as Minister's wife (2017)
- Bhargavi as Deepa's teacher (2017)

=== Season 2 ===
==== Main ====
- Premi Viswanath as Deepa "Vantalakka" Dasarath Karthik: Karthik's wife; (2024–present)
- Nirupam Paritala as Karthik Sridhar: Deepa's second husband; (2024–present)
- Chaitra as Sourya Karthik: Deepa and Narasimha's daughter; (2024–present)
- Gayatri Simhadri as Jyotsna Dasu: Karthik's ex-fiancee; (2024–present)

==== Recurring ====
- Nata Kumari as Parijatham: Jyotsna and Kasi's paternal grandmother; (2024-present)
- Seetha as Sumitra: Deepa's mother; (2024-present)
- Malladi Shiva Narayana as Shiva Narayana: Deepa and Karthik's grandfather; (2024-present)
- Suresh Rai as Dasarath: Deepa's father; (2024-present)
- Swarna as Kanchana: Karthik's mother; (2024-present)
- Lakshmi Raj as Dasu: Jyotsna and Kasi's father;
- Usha Rani as Anasuya: Deepa's foster aunt and ex-mother-in-law; (2024-present)
- Jeedigunta Sridhar as Sridhar: Karthik and Swapna's father; (2024-present)
- Karna as Kasi: Jyotsna's brother; (2024-present)
- Archana as Kaveri: Karthik's stepmother; (2024-present)
- Amulya Reddy as Swapna :Karthik's Stepsister
- Srikar Krishna as Suraj : Jyotsna's Love Interest

and revealed to be as Malini and Krishnamurthy's Son.

- Unknown man as Dakshinamurthy:Shivanarayana's friend turned rival and Sumitra's Father

==== Special Appearances ====
- Jyothi as Jyothi (reprised her role from Paape Maa Jeevanajyothi)
- Ram Jagan as VV (reprised his role from Paape Maa Jeevanajyothi)

== Production ==
In late March 2020, the series' production and broadcast halted (along with that of all other Indian television series and films) due to the COVID-19 pandemic. It resumed in June of that year. On 18 February 2024, Star Maa released the promo of the second season titled as "Karthika Deepam - Idi Nava Vasantham".

== Adaptations ==
=== Season 1 ===
Language	Title	Original release	Network(s)	Last aired	Notes
Malayalam	Karuthamuthu കറുത്തമുത്ത്	20 October 2014	Asianet	9 August 2019	Original
Kannada	Muddulakshmi ಮುದ್ದುಲಕ್ಷ್ಮಿ	22 January 2018	Star Suvarna	26 August 2023	Remake
Tamil	Bharathi Kannamma பாரதி கண்ணம்மா	25 February 2019	Star Vijay	6 August 2023	Remake
Marathi	Rang Majha Vegla रंग माझा वेगळा	30 October 2019	Star Pravah	3 September 2023	Remake
Hindi	Kartik Purnima कार्तिक पूर्णिमा	3 February 2020	Star Bharat	27 March 2020	Remake
Bengali	Anurager Chhowa অনুরাগের ছোঁয়া	7 February 2022	Star Jalsha	30 November 2025	Remake
Hindi	Yeh Jhuki Jhuki Si Nazar ये झुकी झुकी सी नज़र	7 March 2022	StarPlus	25 June 2022	Remake
Hindi	Dil Ko Tumse Pyaar Hua दिल को तुमसे प्यार हुआ	15 July 2024	StarPlus	17 February 2025	Remake

=== Season 2 ===
Language	Title	Original release	Network(s)	Last aired	Notes
Tamil	Chellamma செல்லம்மா	9 May 2022	Star Vijay	14 September 2024	Original
Kannada	Sharade ಶಾರದೆ	17 March 2025	Star Suvarna	Ongoing	Remake
Hindi	Shehzaadi... Hai Tu Dil Ki शहज़ादी... है तू दिल की	4 December 2025	StarPlus	17 March 2026	Remake

== Reception ==
=== Viewership ===
After a few months, the series became one of the top-rated Indian and Telugu television programs. Its highest rating had been 19.7 TVR. In the first week of June 2021, Karthika Deepam set a ratings record of 20.8TVR, rivalling the legacy of Kyunki saas bhi kabhi bahu thi.

In January 2019, the series had an average rating of about12 TVR. In October 2020, it remained a top-rated series. During week 34, it maintained a top position with 18.35 TVR. In week 42, it had an 18.56 TVR.

=== Ratings ===
BARC data
Week	Year	Viewership (in millions)	Rank	Ref.
47	2017	7.09	4	
49	2017	7.71	2	
24	2018	6.01	1	
28	2018	7.24	1	
31	2018	9.05	1	
33	2018	11.93	1	
34	2018	10.1	1	
38	2018	11.46	1	
40	2018	12.49	1	
41	2018	12.81	1	
42	2018	12.14	1	
43	2018	13.01	1	
45	2018	12.71	1	
52	2018	13.49	1	
28	2019	12.84	1	
31	2019	15.24	1	
41	2019	13.9	1	
43	2019	15.43	1	
45	2019	15.45	1	
47	2019	16.2	1	
48	2019	15.71	1	
49	2019	16.05	1	
50	2019	15.88	1	
8	2020	15.01	1	
16	2020	5.04	4	
28	2020	12.4	1	
30	2020	12.48	1	
32	2020	14.32	1	
33	2020	14.8	2	
34	2020	14.94	1	
44	2020	15.11	1	
45	2020	14.97	1	
47	2020	13.61	1	
51	2020	13.68	1	
52	2020	13.52	1	
1	2021	13.63	1	
2	2021	13.31	1	
3	2021	14.27	1	
4	2021	13.97	1	
5	2021	14.08	1	
6	2021	14.54	1	
7	2021	13.96	1	
8	2021	13.54	1	
9	2021	12.95	1	
10	2021	13.53	1	
11	2021	13.63	1	
13	2021	13.89	1	
14	2021	14.13	1	
15	2021	14.27	1	
16	2021	14.05	1	
17	2021	13.99	1	
18	2021	14.04	1	
19	2021	13.51	1	
20	2021	13.82	1	
21	2021	16.08	1	
22	2021	15.92	1	

=== Reception ===
According to The Hindu, "The serial follows a faithful template set by Ekta Kapoor, that trendsetter who gave (mostly) housewives soapy and weepy sagas which belied both sense and sensibility at every tantalizing turn." An Asianet News reviewer wrote, "The serial, which takes place between trust and distrust, continues to take a turn for the worse."
