= Chick Flick (TV series) =

2020 Indian web series

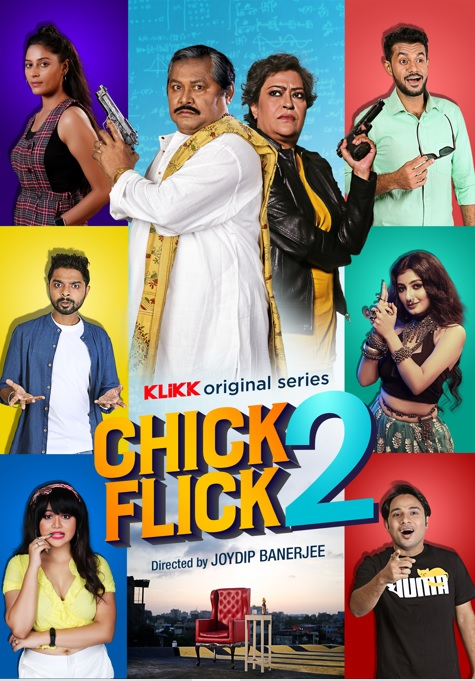
- Genre: Crime, Comedy
- Story by: Soumit Deb, Joydip Banerjee, Durbar Sharma
- Directed by: Joydip Banerjee
- Starring: Sudipa Basu; Kharaj Mukherjee; Poulomi Das
- Music by: Nilanjan Ghosh
- Country of origin: India
- Original language: Bengali
- No. of seasons: 2
- No. of episodes: 16

Production
- Producer: Santanu Chatterjee
- Cinematography: Ankkit Sengupta

Original release
- Release: 10 November 2020 – 29 November 2021

Chick Flick is a 2022 Indian Bengali language crime and comedy web series directed by Joydip Banerjee and written by Soumit Deb.

The web series starring Sudipa Basu, Debraj Bhattacharya, Saoli Chattopadhyay, Kharaj Mukherjee, Anujoy Chattopadhyay, Sabuj Bardhan, Palash Haque, Jina Tarafdar, Sayan Ghosh and Poulomi Das are in the lead roles. The first season was released on 6 December 2019 on Klikk.

== Synopsis ==
=== Season 1 ===
The Great Indian diamond is being smuggled by Medusa, a crime lord, and is being concealed in a toy chicken that is lost in the process. Three strangers, Tanay, Bumpy, and Montu, are unwittingly sucked into this sinister network of criminal activity. To find the lost toy, Medusa has them work together. They are assisted in their cat-and-mouse game by Zinia and Sweety. In addition, ACP Duronto is on a quest to capture Medusa, and Bisorgo, the all-powerful don, stalks Medusa nonstop. The narrative is an exhilarating roller coaster ride full with odd comedy, vivid characters, intense action, and tantalising turns.

=== Season 2 ===
The "troika" of Tanay, Bumpy, and Montu are back, along with Jinia, as they set off on a quest to discover the recipe for a recently discovered enigmatic chemical code-named "Amrita." Along with drug kingpin Jethu and the head of a betting syndicate, Mastani, their arch-enemy Medusa is also present. As the hunt for "Amrita" intensifies in season two, the enjoyment is increased thrice.

== Cast ==
- Sudipa Basu as Medusa
- Kharaj Mukherjee as Jethu
- Poulomi Das as Sweety
- Saoli Chattopadhyay as Jinia
- Anujoy Chattopadhyay as Tanay
- Debraj Bhattacharya as Goja
- Sabuj Bardhan as Montu
- Palash Haque as Limca
- Sayan Ghosh as Bumpy
- Jina Tarafdar as Bimboboti
- Krishnendu Dewanji as Inspector Batabyal
- Ratasree Dutta as Mastani
- Poushmita Goswami as CP
- Durbar Sharma as Anko Honours
- Prasenjit Bardhan as Nawab

=== Season 1 ===
No.	Title	Directed by	Original release date
1	"Nagordola"	Joydip Banerjee	10 November 2020
2	"Lalkamal Nilkamal"	Joydip Banerjee	10 November 2020
3	"Choto Robinhood"	Joydip Banerjee	10 November 2020
4	"Banglar Mandakini"	Joydip Banerjee	10 November 2020
5	"Nawab the Beltman"	Joydip Banerjee	10 November 2020
6	"Lucky Murgi"	Joydip Banerjee	10 November 2020
7	"Gurupurnima"	Joydip Banerjee	10 November 2020
8	"2 Crores"	Joydip Banerjee	10 November 2020
9	"Shodhbodh"	Joydip Banerjee	10 November 2020

=== Season 2 ===
No.	Title	Directed by	Original release date
1	"Bajir wow"	Joydip Banerjee	29 November 2021
2	"Ma lokkhi"	Joydip Banerjee	29 November 2021
3	"Shanghai blues"	Joydip Banerjee	29 November 2021
4	"Plan B"	Joydip Banerjee	29 November 2021
5	"Elizabeth er saree"	Joydip Banerjee	29 November 2021
6	"Jatinga pakhi"	Joydip Banerjee	29 November 2021
7	"Bohiragoto"	Joydip Banerjee	29 November 2021
