= Premi Viswanath =

Indian actress

- Born: Premi Viswanath; Edappally Ernakulam
- Occupations: Actress; Model; Anchor
- Years active: 2014 – present

Premi Vishwanath is an Indian television actress from Kerala who predominantly appears in Malayalam and Telugu television shows and films. She is known for her role as Karthika/Karthu in the soap opera Karuthamuthu, which premiered on Asianet and also for portraying Deepa in the Telugu serial Karthika Deepam on Star Maa.

== Career ==
Premi Vishwanath began her acting career in Malayalam television with Karuthamuthu, in which she played the lead role of Karthika Balachandran. She received the Best Debutante Female award at the 2014 Asianet Television Awards for her performance in the series. Following her exit from Karuthamuthu, she appeared as Mayilamma in Moonumani, which aired on Flowers (TV series).

She later entered the Telugu television industry and gained wider recognition for portraying Deepa in Karthika Deepam (Telugu TV series), the Telugu remake of Karuthamuthu. The series aired on Star Maa from 16 October 2017 to 23 January 2023. She reprised the role in Karthika Deepam 2, which premiered on 25 March 2024 and is a remake of Chellamma (TV series).

She is related to actor Jayasurya.

== Films ==
Year	Title	Role	Language	Notes
2021	Akame	—N/a	Malayalam	Producer, Short film
2023	Custody	Mangalam	Tamil-Telugu	Tamil-Telugu bilingual film
2023	Salmon 3D	Mariya	Tamil	

== Television ==
Year	Title	Role	Channel	Language	Notes
2014-2015	Karuthamuthu	Karthika Balachandran	Asianet	Malayalam	later replaced by Renu Soundar
2015	Kuttikalavara	Herself as Host	Flowers	Malayalam	later replaced by Parvathy R Krishna
2015-2016	Moonumani	Mayilamma	Flowers	Malayalam	
2016–2017	Kayamkulam Kochunniyude Makan	Thamara	Surya TV	Malayalam	
2017–2023	Karthika Deepam	Deepa	Star Maa	Telugu	Remake of Karuthamuthu
2019	Gorintaku	Deepa	Star Maa	Telugu	Cameo appearance
2020	Chelleli Kapuram	Deepa	Star Maa	Telugu	Cameo appearance
2021	Ente Maathavu	Devika	Surya TV	Malayalam	
2024–present	Karthika Deepam 2	Deepa	Star Maa	Telugu	Remake of Chellamma

== Awards ==
Year	Award	Category	Work	Result	Ref
2014	Asianet Television Awards	Best Debutante Female	Karuthamuthu	Won	
2014	J.C Foundation Award	Best Actress	Karuthamuthu	Won	
2018	Star Maa Parivaar Awards	Best Jodi (along with Nirupam Pariatala)	Karthika Deepam	Nominated	
2018	Star Maa Parivaar Awards	Best Actress	Karthika Deepam	Won	
