= Kishor Satya =

Indian actor

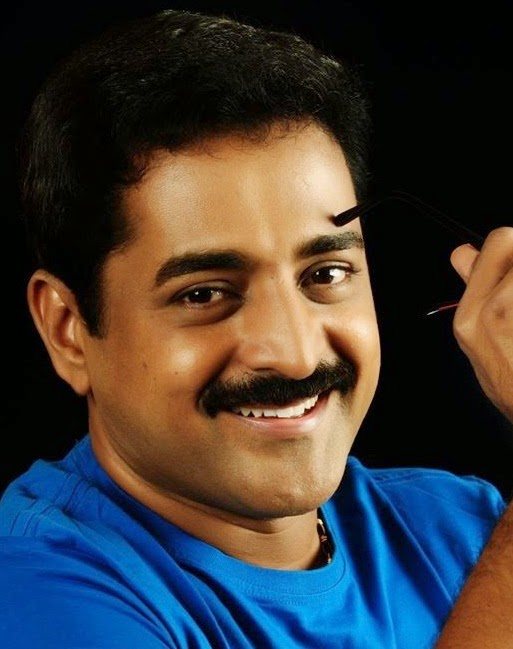
- Born: Mallappally, Kerala, India
- Occupations: Actor; Assistant Director; Radio jockey; Host
- Years active: 1996–present
- Website: www.kishorsatya.com

Kishor Satya is an Indian actor who works in Malayalam films and television soaps.

== Career ==
Satya started his career in the visual media as the assistant director of Malayalam movies. He made his debut as assistant director of the film Kanjirapally Kariyachan and Adivaram. His next project was malayalam film actor through a villain's role in Youth Festival (2004) directed by Jose Thomas. It was followed by supporting roles in Malayalam movies including Thaskaraveeran (2005), Rahasya Police(2009), Keralotsavam (2009), The Thriller (2010), The City of God (2011) and Paisa Paisa (2013) etc. after Kishore debuted as a Malayalam Television actor though Asianet serial Manthrakodi directed by A.M.Nazeer telecasted during October 2005 – 2006. The portrayal of the character Aravind C Menon in that serial made Kishore very popular among Malayali audiences. It was followed by Kairali TV serial Kanalpoovu (February 2007 -July 2007) directed by Melilaa Rajasekhar. He later acted in Amrithatv serial The Officer (2008)directed by G.S.Vijayan and Mazhavil Manorama serial Kathayile Rajakumari (2011) written and directed by K.K.Rajeev.He played the role of Dr Balachandran in Asianet Serial Karutha Muthu (2014) by Praveen Kadakkavur.

== Personal life ==
He was married to South Indian actress Charmila from 1996 to 1999, when he was working as an AD on one of her Malayalam films. He had an extra-marital affair while living in Sharjah which led to divorce from Charmila

== Awards and nominations ==
Year	Result	Award	Category	Role	Serial
2015	Won	Asianet Television awards 2015	Best Actor	Dr.Balachandran	Karuthamuthu
2015	Nominated	Asianet Television awards 2015	Most popular Actor	Dr.Balachandran	Karuthamuthu
2016	Won	Flowers Television awards 2016	Best actor	Dr.Balachandran	Karuthamuthu
2016	Won	Asianet Television Awards 2016	Best Actor	Dr.Balachandran	Karuthamuthu
2016	Nominated	Asianet Television Awards 2016	Most popular Actor	Dr.Balachandran	Karuthamuthu
2016	Won	4th Santha Devi memorial awards	Best actor	Dr.Balachandran	Karuthamuthu
2016	Won	Thikurushy foundation award	Best actor	Dr.Balachandran	Karuthamuthu
2017	Nominated	Asianet Television Awards 2017	Best Star Pair	Dr.Balachandran	Karuthamuthu

== Acting credits ==
=== Television ===
Year	Show	Channel	Notes	Ref.
2005–2006	Manthrakodi	Asianet	Debut as lead actor	
2007	Kanalpoovu	Kairali TV		
2008	The Officer	Amrita TV		
2011–2012	Kathayile Rajakumari	Mazhavil Manorama		
2013	Kanakkinavu	Kairali TV		
2014–2017	Karuthamuthu	Asianet		
2015–2016	Vazhve Maayam	DD Malayalam		
2018	Kshanaprabhachanchalam	Amrita TV		
2020–2023	Swantham Sujatha	Surya TV		
2023–2024	Ammakkilikkoodu	Surya TV		
2024	Swargavathil Pakshi	Surya TV		

=== Filmography ===
Year	Title	Roles	Notes
1996	Kanjirappally Kariachan	College student	
2004	Youth Festival	Ranjan	
2005	Thaskaraveeran	Deepu	
2009	Rahasya Police	Assistant Commissioner of Police	
2009	Keralotsavam 2009	Salim Mubarak	
2010	The Thriller	Elder brother of victim	
2011	City of God	Mehaboob	
2013	Paisa Paisa	Roy	
2013	Bicycle Thieves	Private banker	
2013	Daivathinte Swantham Cleetus	Savichan	
2014	Corporate	Anandan	
2016	James & Alice	Dr. Alexander	
2016	Oozham	Parthasarathy	
2016	Swarna Kaduva	Johnichan	
2017	Gemini	Jojo Varghese	
2017	Lakshyam	Alexander Mathew	
2017	Ayal Jeevichirippund	Ajay	
2020	Isha	Munavar Imthyas	
2020	Keralam Gathi Maatum	Himself	Music album
2024	Kadha Innuvare	Janaki father	

=== As host ===
TV shows

Year	PROGRAM	Channel	Notes
2001	Vyaparangalude Mahotsavam	Kairali TV	Show on Dubai shopping festival
2008	Vanitharathnam	Amrita TV	Reality show
2008	Vanitharathnam 2	Amrita TV	Reality show
2013	Sundari Neeyum Sundaran Njanum	Asianet	replacing Archana Kavi

Award nights

Title	Years	Channel	Notes
Asianet Film Awards	2005,2011 and 2013	Asianet	
Amrita TV Film Awards	2007 & 2010	Amrita TV	
Amma Gulf Awards	2009, 2011	Kairali TV	
World Malayali Council Awards	2010 & 2011	-	
Jaihind Film Awards	2012 &2013	JaiHind TV	
Asianet Television Awards	2012,2013,2014, 2015,2016	Asianet	
Chithra Pournami	2011	-	to feliciate Singer K.S, Chitra
92.7 Big FM Music Awards	2013	-	
Miss Kerala Pageant	2010	-	
