= Yeh Jhuki Jhuki Si Nazar =

Indian television series

- Genre: Soap opera
- Created by: Rajita Sharma
- Written by: Soumyata Narula
- Screenplay by: Gourav Misra
- Story by: Rajita Sharma; Vikas Sharma; Prateek Dagheech; Akash Deep
- Directed by: Ashish Shrivastava
- Starring: Swati Rajput; Ankit Siwach
- Opening theme: Ek Ajnabee, Haseena Se
- Country of origin: India
- Original language: Hindi
- No. of episodes: 96

Production
- Producers: Rajita Sharma; Vivek Budakoti
- Production locations: Mumbai, Maharashtra
- Editor: Sameer gandhi
- Camera setup: Multi-camera
- Running time: 22 minutes
- Production company: Katha Kottage Productions

Original release
- Network: StarPlus
- Release: 7 March – 25 June 2022

Related
- Karuthamuthu; Karthika Deepam; Rang Majha Vegla; Anurager Chhowa; Bharathi Kannamma; Kartik Purnima; Muddulakshmi; Dil Ko Tumse Pyaar Hua

Yeh Jhuki Jhuki Si Nazar is an Indian Hindi-language drama television series that premiered on 7 March 2022 on StarPlus. It stars Swati Rajput and Ankit Siwach. The series ended on 25 June 2022. It is the remake of Asianet's Malayalam series Karuthamuthu.

== Plot ==
Diya Mathur, a topper in hotel management gets humiliated everywhere for her dark complexion. Being 32 years old she is not married as everyone rejects her for her complexion. Even though applying for front desk in her dream hotel, she was directed to the kitchen department due to her looks. Later she meets Armaan in a hotel, and he befriends her. Later Armaan's mother comes to Diya's house for alliance but instead of her chooses her younger sister Palki, who is fair-skinned and beautiful. Heartbroken Diya befriends Kajal Asthana in her workplace.

Diya and Armaan's constant meeting make them fall in love with each other. Armaan reveals his feelings to Krish, which Bhavna hears. Sudha and Bhavna plot and make Armaan misunderstand that Diya doesn't like him. Heartbroken, Armaan agrees for alliance with Palki.

On the engagement day, both families learn about Armaan and Diya's true feelings for each other. Sudha and Bhavna get tensed. On Palki's insistence that she doesn't love Armaan, Diya agrees for marriage with Armaan. Bhavna harms Diya's legs during the Haldi function. Against all odds, Diya and Armaan get married. Sudha is revealed to be a dominating woman who wants to control the lives of her family members. Though Sudha tries to adjust with Diya, Bhavna instigates her mind against the other. Sudha falls to Bhavna's words and tries to show Diya her place keeping her control superior over others. Armaan who is somewhat aware of Sudha's this behavior tries to balance situations for her. After marriage, Diya gets Armaan meet her friend Kajal who is revealed to Armaan's ex-wife who cheated on him.

== Cast ==
=== Main ===
- Swati Rajput as Diya Mathur Rastogi– Anjali and Brij's elder daughter; Jhanvi and Palki's sister; Armaan's second wife
- Ankit Siwach as Armaan Rastogi – Sudha's elder son; Bhavna and Krish's brother; Kajal's ex-husband; Diya's husband

=== Recurring ===
- Manasi Joshi Roy as Sudha Rastogi – Armaan, Bhavna and Krish's mother
- Shabaaz Abdullah Badi as Arjun Kumar Kohli – Diya's ex-boyfriend; Armaan's rival
- Jayroop Jeevan as Brij Mohan Mathur – Anjali's husband; Diya, Jhanvi and Palki's father
- Neelu Kohli as Anjali Mathur – Brij's wife; Diya, Jhanvi and Palki's mother
- Preetika Chauhan as Kajal Asthana (formerly Rastogi) – Diya's friend, Armaan's ex-wife
- Swayam Joshi as School Boy
- Sapna Rathore as Saloni Khanna - Armaan's childhood best-friend
- Mrinal Navell Chandra as Palki Mathur – Anjali and Brij's youngest daughter; Diya and Jhanvi's sister; Krish's love interest
- Saloni Jain as Janvi Mathur – Anjali and Brij's second daughter; sabik and Palki's sister
- Richa Tiwari as Bhavna Rastogi Raizada– Sudha's daughter; Armaan and Krish's sister; Pawan's wife
- Tehraan Bakshi as Pawan Raizada - Bhavna's husband; Armaan and Krish's brother-in-law; Sudha's son-in-law
- Krish Pathak as Krish Rastogi – Sudha's younger son; Armaan and Bhavna's brother; Palki's love interest
- Surabhi Tiwari as Ruby Bhatia – Diya's colleague
- Saurav Goyal as Vivek
- Saniya Nagdev as Nimmi – Matchmaker
- Ashish Bhargav as Mr. Chaddha
- Satyen Chaturvedi
- Gunjan Bhatia as Shalu
- Suraj Bharadwaj as Armaan's best friend
- Unknown as Rocky Tiwari

=== Guest ===
- Ayesha Singh as Sai Joshi from Ghum Hai Kisikey Pyaar Meiin
- Sumbul Touqeer as Imlie from Imlie

== Production ==
=== Development ===
The show had an initial working title of Chandni, later being retitled to Yeh Jhuki Jhuki Si Nazar.

=== Release ===
The first promo was launched on 29 January 2022 featuring Swati Rajput.
