= Dr. Sharmila =

Indian doctor, television personality and film actress

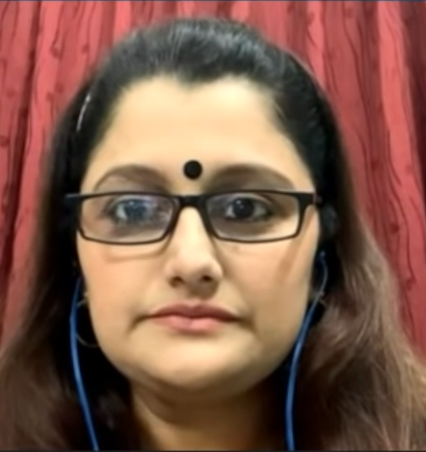
- Born: Sharmila Kothandaraman; 15 November 1974 (age 51); Bombay (now Mumbai), Maharashtra, India
- Education: MBBS
- Occupations: Actress, anchor, doctor, social activist, YouTuber
- Spouses: A. L. Mohan (m. 2002; div. 2004); S. S. Balaji (m. 2004)
- Children: 1
- Parent: Kothandaraman (father)

YouTube information
- Channels: Sharmila Talkies; Sudar
- Years active: 2022–present
- Genres: Politics, society, art, literature, food, lifestyle, health, soap opera, cinema, science, history
- Subscribers: 305 thousand
- Views: 149 million
- Last updated: 27 October 2025

Dr. Sharmila (born 15 November 1974) is an Indian doctor, actress, social activist and YouTuber. She debuted in a STAR Vijay show, Puthira Punithama? along with N. Mathrubootham, which made her popular. She went on to act in various television series in both Tamil and Malayalam, and some Tamil films.

== Early life ==
Sharmila was born on 15 November 1974 in Bombay (now Mumbai), the capital city of Maharashtra, into a Brahmin family who later settled in Madras (now Chennai), Tamil Nadu. Her father Kothandaraman owned a pharmaceutical concern.

Sharmila had a younger brother Hari who died sometime before 2022.

Sharmila attended C.S.I. Ewart Matriculation Higher Secondary School in Chennai, and was a topper there. She also learnt Bharatanatyam for ten years under Nandana Gopalakrishnan.

== Career ==
=== Medicine ===
Sharmila went on to pursue MBBS degree at Kilpauk Medical College (Chennai) in 1993. Later, she worked as a house surgeon at Government Royapettah Hospital around 1996.

=== Television ===
Sharmila started anchoring quiz shows on Jaya TV (formerly JJ TV), following which she conducted a talk show Indha Vaaram Ivar, in which she interviewed celebrities. She was subsequently selected by reputed psychiatrist Dr. N. Mathrubootham, who wanted to conduct sex education discussions on television, to read the letters from the public. The show, Puthira Punithama? brought Sharmila, who was dubbed "gutsy" for hosting the show, to popularity. Director K. Balachander took notice of her and offered her roles in his tele-serials such as Jannal and Irandaam Chanaakiyan. Sharmila considers Balachander as her mentor and guru who taught her the nuances of acting.

=== YouTube ===
On 24 February 2022, Sharmila announced her Youtube channel named "Sharmila Talkies". The channel's content originally included politics, society, art, literature, food, life, health, soap opera, and cinema. Later, it predominantly discussed politics. On 1 December 2024, another channel named "Sudar" was announced, to cover topics other than politics, including fashion, science and history.

== Television ==
Year	Title	Role	Language	Channel	Notes
	Punnagi		Tamil		
	Kurangu Manasu		Tamil		
1999	Guhan		Tamil	Sun TV	
1999–2000	Jannal-Marabu Kavithaigal	Gomathi	Tamil	Raj TV	
1999	Dhik Dhik Dhik	Viji	Tamil	Sun TV	
2000	Kelviyin Nayagane	Jeevitha	Tamil	Sun TV	
2001	Oorarinda Rahasiyam	Krishnaveni	Tamil	DD Podhigai	
2000–2001	Irandaam Chanakyan		Tamil	Sun TV	
2000	Vishalam	Vishalam	Tamil	DD Podhigai	
2001–2002	Nandini Oppol	Nandini Nurse	Malayalam	Asianet	
2001–2003	Nambikkai	Nandini	Tamil	Sun TV	
2002–2004	Agni Saatchi	Nila	Tamil	Vijay TV	
2002–2004	Indhira	Manogiri	Tamil	Sun TV	
2003–2004	Sahana		Tamil	Jaya TV	
2003–2007	Avargal		Tamil	Sun TV	
2003–2005	Adugiran Kannan	Gayathri	Tamil	Sun TV	
2006	Penn	Uma	Tamil	Sun TV	
2005–2007	Malargal		Tamil	Sun TV	
2005–2007	Muhurtham		Tamil	Sun TV	
2007	Chellamadi Nee Enakku	Shylaja	Tamil	Sun TV	
2007	Naanayam		Tamil	Sun TV	
2007–2010	Athipookal	Dr. Jhansi	Tamil	Sun TV	
2007	Aṟiviyal Aruvi		Tamil	DD Podhigai	
2008	Devimahathmyam	Mena	Malayalam	Asianet	
2008–2009	Savale Samali	Rajakumari	Tamil	Raj TV	
2008–2009	Naalavathu Mudichu		Tamil	Jaya TV	
2008–2009	Thenmozhiyal		Tamil	Kalaignar TV	
2011	Devimahathmyam	Maharani/Janaki	Malayalam	Asianet	
2011	Adhiparasakthi	Maharani/Janaki	Tamil	Vijay TV	Bilingual with Devimahathmyam
2012–2014	Paartha Gnabagam Illayo		Tamil	Kalaignar TV	
2012–2014	Merku Mambalathil Oru Kadhal		Tamil	Zee Tamil	
2012–2013	Karthigai Pengal		Tamil	Sun TV	
2013–2014	Agni Paravai		Tamil	Puthuyugam TV	
2014–2018	Karuthamuthu	Jagadamba	Malayalam	Asianet	
2015–2019	Valli	Gayatri	Tamil	Sun TV	
2016	Sathyam Shivam Sundaram	Maharani	Malayalam	Amrita TV	
2016	Amme Mahamaye	Rugmini Mohini / Neeli / Dr. Karthika	Malayalam	Surya TV	
2017–2019	Pagal Nilavu	Malarvizhi	Tamil	Vijay TV	
2018–2022	Roja	Shenbagam / Saraswathi	Tamil	Sun TV	
2019	Kadaikutty Singam	Naachiyaar	Tamil	Vijay TV	
2019	Thazhampoo	Devaki	Tamil	Vijay TV	
2019–2020	Tamil Selvi	Dr. Indira	Tamil	Sun TV	
2020	Chandralekha	Vasundhara Devi	Tamil	Sun TV	
2020	Poove Unakkaga	Shenbagam	Tamil	Sun TV	Special Appearance
2020	Magarasi	Vasundhara Devi	Tamil	Sun TV	Special Appearance
2022–2025	Ninaithale Inikkum	Savithri	Tamil	Zee Tamil	

Shows

- Hero Heroine (Sun TV)
- Candit Camera (Sun TV)
- Puthira Punithama?(Vijay TV)
- Quiz program (JJ TV)
- Indha Varam Ivar (Vijay TV)
- Kitchen Super Star - Doubles (Vijay TV)
- Puthandu Saval (Sun TV)
- Roja Rojadan (Sun TV)
- Maathi Yosi (Sun TV)
- Kalviya? Selvama? Veerama? (Sun TV)

== Filmography ==
- All films are in Tamil, unless otherwise noted.

Year	Title	Role	Notes
1997	Kaadhali	Interviewer	
1998	Ponmanam	Priya	
2000	Chinna Chinna Kannile	Herself	
2001	Citizen	Bhai's wife	
2001	Paarthale Paravasam		
2002	Onnaman	Ravisankar's sister in law	Malayalam film
2009	Padikathavan	Kavitha	
2010	Bale Pandiya	Pandiya's mother	
2011	Mappillai	Saravanan's sister	
2011	Narthagi		
2013	Kalyana Samayal Saadham	Raghu's aunt	
2014	Marumunai		
2014	Aindhaam Thalaimurai Sidha Vaidhiya Sigamani	Dr. Sathish Kumar's wife	
2016	Zero	Sharmila	
2017	Kaadhali	Bandhavi's mother	Telugu film
2018	Yenda Thalaiyila Yenna Vekkala		

== Personal life ==
Sharmila married AL Mohan, a TV production executive, but later they filed and were granted a divorce. Later, she married S. S. Balaji, a member of the Viduthalai Chiruthaigal Katchi (VCK).

Sharmila has one child, a daughter, born on 28 December 2004 with a Sri Lankan man named Sivakaran Kulanthavel.

== Awards and nominations ==
- Won, Asianet Television award 2015 for Best Character Actress (special Jury) for Karuthamuthu
- Nomination, Vijay Television Awards for Best Negative role 2017 for Pagal Nilavu
