= Karuthamuthu =

- കറുത്തമുത്ത്
- Genre: Drama; Romance; Thriller
- Written by: Pradeep Panicker
- Story by: Pradeep Panicker
- Directed by: Praveen Kadakkavoor
- Country of origin: India
- Original language: Malayalam
- No. of seasons: 4
- No. of episodes: 1450

Production
- Producer: Althahir Rasheed
- Production location: Kerala
- Cinematography: Hemachandran; B.Kumar
- Editor: Ajith Dev Pothencode
- Camera setup: Multi-camera
- Running time: 22 minutes

Original release
- Network: Asianet
- Release: 20 October 2014 – 9 August 2019

Related
- Karthika Deepam; Muddulakshmi; Bharathi Kannamma; Rang Majha Vegla; Dil Ko Tumse Pyaar Hua; Anurager Chhowa; Kartik Purnima; Yeh Jhuki Jhuki Si Nazar

Karuthamuthu (transl. Black Pearl) is an Indian Malayalam-language television soap opera that premiered on Asianet on 20 October 2014. It aired for five years and ran for 1,450 episodes across four seasons, making it one of the longest ran television serials. It is a sequel to the 2011 television series Kumkumapoovu, with the narrative set after the events of the earlier series and focusing on a different family. Illekettu Namboothiri reprised his role as Satyasheelan from Kumkumapoovu.

The series was also adapted into multiple television serials in other Indian languages, including Hindi, Marathi, Telugu, Tamil, Bengali, and Kannada.

== Plot ==
=== Season 1 ===
Karthika, a dark-skinned young woman raised by her stepfather Shekaran, grows up facing neglect and discrimination, while her stepsister Kanya is favoured. During a marriage alliance visit, Balachandran chooses Karthika over Kanya, while Jayachandran later marries Kanya. Unknown to Karthika, Balachandran had earlier been falsely told that he was infertile as part of a scheme orchestrated by Mareena, who was in love with him. Shekaran suppresses this information and allows the marriage to proceed. When Karthika later becomes pregnant, Balachandran suspects her fidelity, and Mareena exploits the situation further, leading Karthika to leave the household.

=== Season 2 ===
Five years later, Karthika and her daughter are found living in hardship and are brought back by Balachandran’s family. Their return triggers renewed conflict, particularly with Mareena and Shekaran, who seek to eliminate them. Following an accident, Karthika loses her memory and comes under the care of Dr. Arun. The season also includes Jayachandran’s death, Kanya’s imprisonment for killing Mareena, and the eventual reunion of Karthika, Balachandran, and their daughter, before further family tensions emerge.

=== Season 3 ===
After an 18-year leap, Balachandrika, the daughter of Karthika and Balachandran, becomes a sub-collector, and the story shifts to her life. Her relationship with Podimol, her cousin, becomes central, particularly as both are connected to Abhiram. Bala secretly marries Abhiram, while family tensions, misunderstandings, and later violence continue to shape their lives. After Bala gives birth, her daughter is believed lost following an accident, but the child survives and is raised elsewhere through adoption.

=== Season 4 ===
Six years later, the child, Muthu, is growing up with her adoptive family. Subsequent events lead Bala and Abhiram to discover that Muthu is their lost daughter. The revelation causes emotional strain between both families, but a shared arrangement is eventually made for Muthu’s upbringing. The series concludes with the family reaching a reconciliation and Nathan departing on a pilgrimage.

== Cast ==
=== Seasons 1 and 2 (2014 – 2017) ===
- Kishor Satya as Dr. Balachandran
- Premi Viswanath / Renu Soundar as Karthika Balachandran: Balachandran's wife
- Archana Suseelan as Mareena
- Akshara Kishor as Balachandrika/Bala mol (200-775 episodes)
- Richard N. J. as Jayachandran
- Saranya Sasi (1 to 115 episodes)/ Lekshmi Priya (Episodes 116 to 774) as Kanya Jayan
- Santhosh Kurup as Ret Prof. Nathan
- Giridhar as Sreekanth
- Srihari as Kunju Shekharan
- Sreelatha Namboothiri as Shekharan's mother
- Dr. Sharmila as Jagadhamba
- Rajani Murali as Nandini
- Shobha Mohan as Arundhathi
- Devendranath as Dr. Arun
- Thara Kalyan as Mallika
- Akhil Nair as Aromal
- Jayakumar Parameswaran Pillai as Sadanam Sadu
- Arun Mohan as Stephen
- Shiju as Shankar Das
- Lishoy as Dr. Fernandus
- Balachandran Chullikkadu as Dr. Perumal
- Bindu Murali as Lakshmi Dathan
- Sree Padma as Anjana
- Pratheeksha G Pradeep as Raveena
- T.S.Raju as Abhi's ammavan
- Sarath Swamy as Amal
- Anand Narayan as Prem
- Joly Easo as Constable Dakshayani
- Cherthala Lalitha as Sadu's mother / Nathan's sister
- Lalitha as Mallika
- Sree Lakshmi as Anjana
- Illikettu Namboothiri as Sathyaseelan
- Dayana Hameed as Hima

=== Seasons 3 and 4 (2017 – 2019) ===
- Rini Raj as Balachandrika Abhiram IAS
  - Akshara Kishore as young Balachandrika (Footage from season 1)
- Darshana Das as Gayathri Ganeshan (Podimol)
- Niya as Karthika Balachandran
- Pradeep Chandran as Commissioner Abhiram IPS
- Baby Kezhiya as Muthu
- Shalu Menon as Kanya Jayan
- Kiran Iyer as Ganeshan
- Santhosh Kurup as Ret Prof. Nathan
- Giridhar as Sreekanth
- Srihari as Kunju Shekharan
- Sreelatha Namboothiri as Shekharan's mother
- Dr. Sharmila as Jagadhamba
- Soniya Baiju Kottarakkara as Kaipatoor Kanaka
- Anoop Sivasenan as Sukeshan
- Niya as Karthika Balachandran
- Soorya Praveen as Ganga Sukeshan
- Bindu Ramakrishnan as Sukeshan's mother
- Babu Annur as Sukesan's father

== Production ==
Karuthamuthu was directed by Praveen Kadakkavoor from a screenplay by Pradeep Panicker. The series was developed around the social issue of colourism, with its central storyline focusing on a dark-skinned woman who faces discrimination because of her complexion.

In the first and second seasons, the lead actors were Kishor Satya and Richard N. J. who played Balachandran and Jayachandran respectively. The role of Karthika was the Malayalam television debut of actress Premi Viswanath while Saranya Sasi played the antagonist role, Kanya.

In December 2015, Premi Viswanath was replaced by Renu Soundar. Saranya Sasi was replaced by Lekshmi Priya as Saranya diagnosed with Cancer which caused her death in 2021. Later Kishor Satya exited from the show, as the character become sidelined.

From third season, Rini Raj, Pradeep Chandran and Darshana Das played lead roles. Niya and Shalu Menon played Middle aged Karthika and Kanya respectively.

== Adaptations ==
Language	Title	Original release	Network(s)	Last aired	Notes	Ref.
Malayalam	Karuthamuthu കറുത്തമുത്ത്	20 October 2014	Asianet	9 August 2019	Original	
Telugu	Karthika Deepam కార్తీక దీపం	16 October 2017	Star Maa	21 January 2023	Remake	
Kannada	Muddulakshmi ಮುದ್ದುಲಕ್ಷ್ಮಿ	22 January 2018	Star Suvarna	26 August 2023	Remake	
Tamil	Bharathi Kannamma பாரதி கண்ணம்மா	25 February 2019	Star Vijay	6 August 2023	Remake	
Marathi	Rang Majha Vegla रंग माझा वेगळा	30 October 2019	Star Pravah	3 September 2023	Remake	
Hindi	Kartik Purnima कार्तिक पूर्णिमा	3 February 2020	Star Bharat	27 March 2020	Remake	
Bengali	Anurager Chhowa অনুরাগের ছোঁয়া	7 February 2022	Star Jalsha	30 November 2025	Remake	
Hindi	Yeh Jhuki Jhuki Si Nazar ये झुकी झुकी सी नज़र	7 March 2022	StarPlus	25 June 2022	Remake	
Hindi	Dil Ko Tumse Pyaar Hua दिल को तुमसे प्यार हुआ	15 July 2024	StarPlus	17 February 2025	Remake	

== Reception ==
Karuthamuthu received positive response from audiences following its premiere on Asianet. The series significantly improved the channel's 10:00 PM time slot, recording around a 400% increase in ratings within four weeks of its launch. Due to high popularity, the show was moved to primetime of 7.30 PM and for almost 4 years it maintained top 5 positions in TRP rankings. In May 2018, producer Althahir Rasheed stated that the show's sustained popularity and increasing viewership had prompted the writer to expand the storyline by introducing several new characters and extending it into a three-generation narrative. He also confirmed that the series would conclude within 1,500 episodes. From 29 April 2019, the show was moved to evening slot of 6.30 PM for final episodes.

== Controversy ==
In December 2015, lead actress Premi Viswanath, who portrayed Karthika, alleged that she had been removed from Karuthamuthu without prior notice. In a Facebook post, she stated that she had paid only 1500 per day and when she demanded hike they removed from the show and claimed that the production team later cited her participation in a television programme on Flowers TV as the reason for her removal. She denied reports that she had voluntarily left the serial.

The serial's director, Praveen Kadakkavoor, denied Premi's allegations, stating that the decision to replace her had been made earlier due to production-related issues, including dissatisfaction with her performance and alleged professional conduct. He also said that her appearance on another television channel was only the contractual reason cited for her removal, rather than the primary reason.
