= Swati Rajput =

Indian television actress

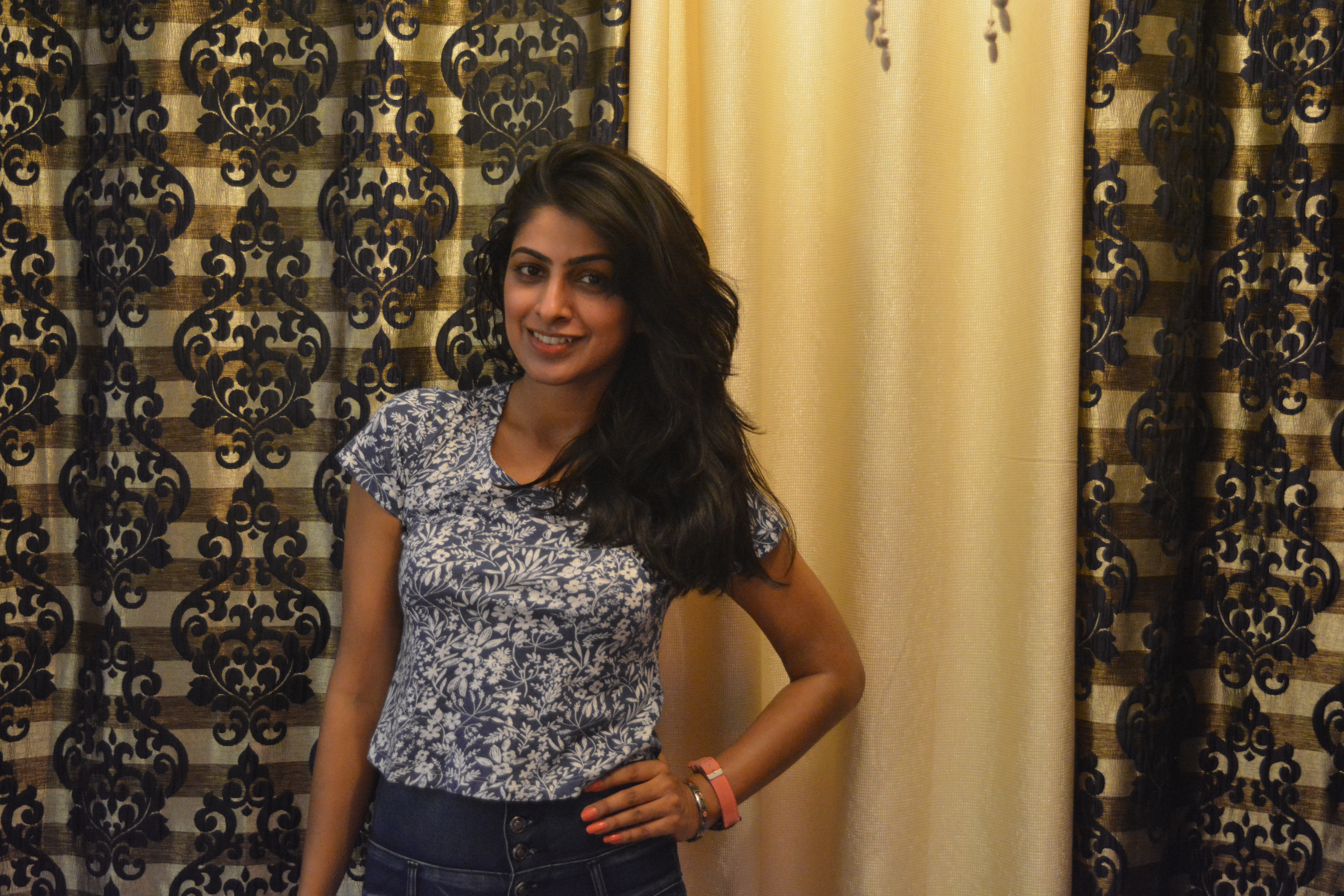
- Rajput in 2015
- Born: 31 January; New Delhi, Delhi, India
- Occupations: Actress; model
- Years active: 2008–present
- Spouse: Saurabh Goel (m. 2023)
- Relatives: Jarit Rajput (brother)

Swati Rajput is an Indian actress who appears in Hindi television. Rajput is best known for her small screen debut in Tum Dena Sath Mera on Life OK in 2011. She played the lead character on the DD National serial – Amrita from 2014 to 2015, where her performance was widely appreciated. She also worked in the serials Iss Pyaar Ko Kya Naam Doon? Ek Baar Phir and Agent Raghav – Crime Branch on &TV. In 2022 she played the lead role of Diya Mathur in Yeh Jhuki Jhuki Si Nazar on Star Plus.

== Career ==
Rajput made her film debut in 2010 with the Telugu film Thakita Thakita and has recently made her Bollywood debut in the film Vodka Diaries with Kay Kay Menon.

== Personal life ==
Rajput married Saurabh Goel, who is from Uttarakhand on 22 February 2023.

== Filmography ==
=== Films ===
Year	Title	Role	Ref.
2010	Thakita Thakita		
2013	Mortoo		
2018	Vodka Diaries	Sera	

== Television ==
Year	Serial	Role	Ref.
2011–2012	Tum Dena Sath Mera	Samyukta "Samy"	
2014–2015	Amrita	Lead	
2015	Iss Pyaar Ko Kya Naam Doon? Ek Baar Phir	Poornima Sarkar	
2015–2016	Agent Raghav – Crime Branch	Agent Swati	
2018	Prithvi Vallabh - Itihaas Bhi, Rahasya Bhi	Sulochana	
2019	Patiala Babes	Jazz	
2021	Ankahi, Ansuni: Jhaagi Files	Barkha	
2022	Yeh Jhuki Jhuki Si Nazar	Diya Mathur Rastogi	
