= Paartha Gnabagam Illayo =

- Genre: Soap opera
- Written by: dialogues written by KN. Natarajan
- Screenplay by: Senthilkumaran
- Directed by: N.Priyan
- Creative director: Khusbhu Sundar
- Starring: Kushboo Sundar; Seenu; Delhi Kumar; Dr. Sharmila; Mercury Sathya; Bharath Kalyan
- Theme music composer: C. Sathya (Title Song); Jai Kishan (Background Score)
- Opening theme: "Yaaru Yaaru" (Vocals); Mathangi Jagdish; M. L. R. Karthikeyan; Pa. Vijay (Lyrics)
- Original language: Tamil
- No. of seasons: 1
- No. of episodes: 472

Production
- Producer: Kushboo Sundar
- Camera setup: Multi-camera
- Running time: approx. 20-22 minutes per episode
- Production company: Avni Telemedia

Original release
- Network: Kalaignar TV
- Release: 5 March 2012 – 31 July 2014

Paartha Gnabagam Illayo was an Indian Tamil-language soap opera starring Kushboo Sundar, Seenu, Delhi Kumar, Dr. Sharmila, Mercury Sathya and Bharath Kalyan. It aired on Kalaignar TV from 5 March 2012 to 31 July 2014 on Monday through Thursday at 21:30PM (IST) and The show was shifted to 20:30PM (IST) time Slot for 472 Episodes. The show was produced by Avni Telemedia and director by N.Priyan. The Family series received positive feedback from viewers and was a huge hit.

== Cast ==
=== Main cast ===
- Kushboo Sundar as Oviya
- "Tamil Padam" Seenu as Karthik
- Delhi Kumar

=== Additional cast ===
- Dr. Sharmila
- Mercury Sathya
- Bharath Kalyan
- Sobhana
- T.R.Latha
- Rajya Lakshmi
- Ravikhirushna
- Sudha
- V.K.R.Raku
- Kavyavarshini
- Vijesh
- Harish Athithya
- Sruthi Retty
- Savithri Rajiv
- Sathiya
- Vaasu
- Muthukumar
- Sangeetha
- Astritha
- Varnika priyan
- Shwetha
- N.S. Madheswaran
- Viswanathan
- Muthukumar
- S. Vasu
- K. Natraj
- Ajay Siva
- Nithya Ravindran
- K.S. Muthukumar
- Minnal Deepa

== Music ==
The title track was composed by C. Sathya while the lyrics were written by Pa. Vijay and sung by Mathangi Jagdish and M. L. R. Karthikeyan.

=== Soundtrack ===
Track list
No.	Title	Lyrics	Singer(s)	Length
1.	"Yaaru Yaaru Naan Yaaru (யாரோ யாரோ நான் யாரோ)"	Pa. Vijay	Mathangi Jagdish and M. L. R. Karthikeyan	3:00

== International broadcast ==
The Series was released on 5 March 2012 on Kalaignar TV. The Show was also broadcast internationally on Channel's international distribution. It airs in Sri Lanka, Singapore, Malaysia, South East Asia, Middle East, Oceania, South Africa and Sub Saharan Africa on Kalaignar TV and also airs in United States, Canada, Europe on Kalaignar Ayngaran TV.

- This serial re-telecast on same Channel only on Singapore and Malaysia from December 2016, aired Monday to Friday at 6:30PM.
