= Shehzaadi... Hai Tu Dil Ki =

Indian drama television series

- Genre: Family drama
- Based on: Chellamma by Sahul Priyadharshini
- Developed by: P. Ranganathan; S. Suresh Babu
- Written by: Dialogues: Rajan Agarwal; Piyush Singh
- Starring: Ashika Padukone; Ankit Raizada
- Country of origin: India
- Original language: Hindi
- No. of seasons: 1
- No. of episodes: 99

Production
- Producer: S. Bharati
- Camera setup: Multi-camera
- Running time: 21–24 minutes
- Production company: Sandalwood Media

Original release
- Network: StarPlus
- Release: 4 December 2025 – 17 March 2026

Related
- Chellamma; Karthika Deepam 2

Shehzaadi... Hai Tu Dil Ki (transl. Princess... Are You of The Heart) is an Indian Hindi-language television drama series which aired from 4 December 2025 to 17 March 2026 on StarPlus. It is official Hindi remake of the Tamil TV series Chellamma of Star Vijay. Produced by Sandalwood Media, it stars Ashika Padukone and Ankit Raizada. It replaced Sampoorna in its timeslot.

== Cast ==
=== Main ===
- Ashika Padukone as Deepa: Bhagyashree's daughter; Bhanu's ex-wife; Kartik's wife; Jyoti's mother (2025–2026)
- Ankit Raizada as Kartik: Ranjeet's son; Kanika's ex-fiancé; Deepa's second husband; Jyoti's stepfather (2025–2026)

=== Recurring ===
- Saisha Kumawat as Jyoti: Bhanu and Deepa's daughter; Kartik's stepdaughter (2025–2026)
- Ali Reza / Unknown as Bhanu: Vaijyanti's son; Deepa's ex–husband; Shobha's husband; Jyoti's father (2025–2026) / (2026)
- Yatish Singh Rajput as Vivaan (2026–2026)
- Prakriti Nautiyal as Bhagyashree: Deepa's mother; Kanika's adoptive mother; Jyoti's grandmother (2025–2026)
- Saniya Khera as Kanika: Bhagyashree's adoptive daughter; Kartik's ex–fiancée (2025–2026)
- Nimai Bali as Kailashnath Kothari: Kanika Kothari's widower; Chitralekha's husband; Deepa's grandfather; Kanika's adoptive grandfather; Jyoti's great grandfather (2025–2026)
- Garima Srivastav as Chitralekha Kothari: Kailashnath's second wife; Deepa's step grandmother; Kanika's adoptive step grandmother; Jyoti's step great grandmother (2025–2026)
- Jignesh Joshi as Ranjeet: Kartik's father; Jyoti's step grandfather (2025–2026)
- Ashwani Rathore as Bantu (2025–2026)

=== Guest appearances ===
- Neha Harsora as Sailee Jadhav from Udne Ki Aasha (2026)
- Kanwar Dhillon as Sachin Deshmukh from Udne Ki Aasha (2026)
- Divya Patil as Khushi from Maana Ke Hum Yaar Nahi (2026)
- Manjeet Makkar as Krishna from Maana Ke Hum Yaar Nahi (2026)
- Anurima Chakraborty as Raushni Ranjan from Tod Kar Dil Mera (2026)
- Ashish Raghav as Raj Ranjan from Tod Kar Dil Mera (2026)

== Production ==
=== Casting ===
Ashika Padukone was confirmed to play Deepa. Ankit Raizada was signed to play Kartik. Prakriti Nautiyal was cast as Bhagyashree.

=== Release ===
In November 2025, StarPlus unveiled a teaser introducing the new show titled Shehzadi Hai Tu Dil Ki, featuring Ashika Padukone and Ankit Raizada.
