= Muddulakshmi =

Indian television series

- Also known as: Muddulakshmiya Muddumanigalu; O Muddumanase
- Genre: Family drama
- Written by: Girish Madhyam
- Directed by: Dileep Gowda
- Starring: see below
- Country of origin: India
- Original language: Kannada
- No. of episodes: 1725

Production
- Producer: Harish Babu
- Cinematography: Nagaraj
- Editor: Kiran Kumar Kurihalli
- Camera setup: Multi-camera
- Running time: 22 minutes
- Production company: Taliru productions

Original release
- Network: Star Suvarna
- Release: 22 January 2018 – 26 August 2023

Related
- Karuthamuthu

Muddulakshmi is an Indian Kannada-language television drama series that aired on Star Suvarna. It premiered on 22 January 2018. It is an official remake of Asianet's Malayalam TV series Karuthamuthu. On 24 January 2022, it started a new season and rebranded as Muddumanigalu, which ended on 20 May 2023. From 22 May 2023, it started new season and rebranded as O Muddumanase.

== Series overview ==
| Season | Title | No.of episodes | Original broadcast | |
| Season | Title | No.of episodes | First aired | Last aired |
|---|---|---|---|---|
| 1 | Muddulakshmi | 1213 | 22 January 2018 | 22 January 2022 |
| 2 | Muddumanigalu | 415 | 24 January 2022 | 20 May 2023 |
| 3 | O Muddhumanase | 84 | 22 May 2023 | 26 August 2023 |

== Plot ==
=== Muddulakshmi ===
Muddulakshmi, a sweet and dark-skinned woman, endures prejudice because of her skin colour. Doctor Dhruvant, a cardiac surgeon, falls in love with her and they marry. Her mother-in-law, Soundarya, first opposes her, but she is eventually accepted. Meanwhile, Dhruvant's coworker Sharvari adores him and attempts to separate Dhruvant and Muddulakshmi so that she can marry him. Muddulakshmi becomes pregnant shortly after, and Sharvari twists Dhruvant's mind by alleging that it is not his kid and that Muddulakshmi has had an affair. Dhruvant accepts this and begins to mistrust Muddulakshmi. He becomes enraged and confronts Muddulakshmi, leaving her and her family stunned and heartbroken. Dhruvant is sceptical of Muddulakshmi's claim that it is their child. While Soundarya is determined to bring them together, Sharvari plans to keep them apart.

After eight years, Srishti and Drishti meet and become close, unaware of their relationship. This causes Muddulakshmi to meet Dhruvant and his family, and Dhruvant and Muddulakshmi to frequently disagree. While Soundarya is determined to bring them together, Sharvari plans to keep them apart. The plot revolves around Muddulakshmi and Dhruvant reuniting after a DNA test reveals that Srishti and Drishti are their offspring. Soundarya discloses that Drishti is Srishti's twin sister, and that they are both Muddulakshmi and Dhruvant's offspring. Drishti notices a lady fainting from thirst while driving. She assists the lady in getting home. She notices Srishti's photo in the lady's residence and inquires about it, learning who she is. She believes she was adopted in this manner.

The climax depicts Dhruvant, Muddu, Srishti, and Drishti taking a journey to Chikmagalur where they have fun while Srishti is fascinated by driving a car. Srishti begins driving aggressively on a hill, and Muddu reluctantly joins the car in the absence of Dhruvant and Drishti. Drishti begins to worry after the automobile loses its equilibrium, and Dhruvant boards the vehicle to save his daughter and wife. Even though the danger has passed, his automobile collides with a rock and goes off the cliff, killing Dhruvant, Muddu, and Drishti, while Srishti, the sole survivor, loses consciousness.

=== Muddumanigalu ===
Drishti manages to survive the accident, but little did she know that Srishti also managed to survive with the help of a local couple. Growing up, Srishti forgets her past due to accident trauma and fails to recognise Drishti and Soundarya's presence after several years. Needless to say, destiny brings them together when they marry brothers within the same family.

== Cast ==
- Ashwini as Muddulakshmi / Jahnavi (2018–2022; 2023)
- Charith Balappa as Cardiologist Dr. Dhruvant (2018–2021)
  - Karthik Samag replaced Balappa in June 2021 (2021–2022)
- Archana Anantha as Soundarya
- Rakshit as Shivu
- Samishkaa as Drishti
  - Sony Mulewa replaced Samishkaa
  - Shivani as Young Drishti (2019–2022)
- Aishwarya H as Srishti
  - Lahari as Young Srishti
- Rakshith as Akul
- Anu Poovamma as Aishwarya
- Nandini Gowdah as Sharvari
- Ananthavelu
- Vanishreee as Aishwarya's mother
- N.T. Ramaswamy as Aishwarya's father
- Mico Shivu
- Harish Babu
- Lakshmi Siddaiah

== Production ==
=== Filming ===
Owing to the COVID-19 pandemic, the filming of all the Indian television series and films was suspended from 19 March 2020 and new episodes airing were stopped. The filming of the series resumed on 25 May 2020 and new episodes started to air from June 2020.

=== Casting ===
Archana Anantha who plays the role of Soundarya in Karuthamuthu's Telugu remake Karthika Deepam reprises the role in Muddulakshmi. In June 2021, lead Charith Balappa quit the series due to the COVID-19 pandemic and was replaced by Karthik Samag.

=== Crossover episodes ===
The series had a crossover with Billi Hendthi in June 2018, Premaloka in January 2020 and Sangarsha in September 2020, March 2021. In September 2018, it also had a crossover with the 3 serials Sarvamangala Mangalye, Shree and Krishna Tulasi in a special episode.

== Reception ==
In week 42 of 2020, it received 3903 impressions gaining fourth position.
