= Chellamma (TV series) =

Tamil language TV series

- Genre: Drama
- Created by: P. Jaganathan; S.Suresh Babu
- Written by: Sahul Priyadharshini Shajagan
- Screenplay by: Sahul Priyadharshini Shajagan
- Directed by: Vel Raj (Episode 205-729); Francis Kathiravan (Episode 1-202)
- Starring: Anshitha Akbarsha; Arnav Amjath
- Theme music composer: Karaneeswaran
- Opening theme: Chellama Chellama by K.S Chitra
- Country of origin: India
- Original language: Tamil
- No. of episodes: 726

Production
- Producer: P. Jagan Nath
- Cinematography: G.S Vijay Krishnan
- Editor: G. Ramesh Karthik
- Camera setup: Multi-camera
- Running time: 22 minutes
- Production company: Box Office Studio

Original release
- Network: Star Vijay
- Release: 9 May 2022 – 14 September 2024

Chellamma is an Indian-Tamil language drama television series starring Anshitha Akbarsha and Arnav Amjath. Directed by Vel Raj and Francis Kathiravan. The series revolves around a single village mother Chellamma who has unconditional love for her daughter. It premiered on 9 May 2022 and ended on 14 September 2024 with 726 episodes. The series is also dubbed into Malayalam as Amma Manassu from 31 July 2023 to 4 June 2026 on Asianet.

== Plot ==
The narrative opens with a mother's love and her daughter in a village where she experiences challenges and numerous problems. Unfortunate occurrences lead Chellamma, a biological daughter of Mahendran and daughter, to Lakshmi's doorway with no knowledge of their prior connection throughout their youth. What she went through it is how she attempts to get over it.

Chellamma, a dedicated mother who works as a maid in Lakshmi's home, relates the tale of the mother and daughter's love and affection. She was married, but her painful marriage with her spouse resulted in a divorce. Her husband remarried, continuing his plan to repeatedly hurt Chellama while doing so. Chellama is a maid that works in Mahendran and Lakshmi's home. She is regarded as one of the most devoted employees there, and they assist her in paying for her daughter's schooling. Her husband once threatened to never traumatise her if she removed the mangle sutra. He used Mega, a fictitious daughter of Mahendran and Lakshmi, to irritate her and manipulate her to sever their ties with the Chellama family, among other things. Where Chellama also responded, stating that if you damage me, that will also remain as the strength of God's light.

Chellamma is respected by Lakshmi and Mahendran, who also regard her as a daughter. The protagonist then encounters Janaki's son Siddharth. Despite having a large group of coworkers and treating Chellamma as his everything, he likes her but is unable to show his affection. Mega, meantime, is a fraudulent daughter who enjoys hurting others and dislikes it when things are going well. She misuses everything and ruins every connection. Soon after, Chellamma's was established, where Mahendran and Lakshmi respect her as their biological daughter. Margatham and Chellamma's ex-husband irritate Mega. The storyline then goes on to reveal Margatham's loss to Siddu and Chellamma's romantic connection.

== Cast ==
- Anshitha Akbarsha as Chellamma: Lakshmi and Mahendran's biological daughter, Manickam's ex-wife, Siddhu's wife, Malar's mother. (2022–2024)
- Arnav Amjath as Siddharth (Siddhu): Janaki and Vasudevan's son, Chellamma's second husband, Mega's ex-fiancé, Aarthi's brother, Malar's step-father. (2022–2024)
- Baby Kanmani as Malar: Chellamma and Manickam's daughter, Siddhu's step-daughter. (2022–2024)
- Divya Ganesh (2022) / VJ Sriya Surendran (Dec.2022–2024) as Mega: Saravanan's biological daughter, Siddhu's ex-fiancé, Mahesh's wife, Lakshmi and Mahendran's foster daughter, Ria's biological mother.
- Anandha Krishnan as Manickam: Chellamma's ex-husband, Malar's father. (2022–2024) (Dead)
- Jebin John as Mahesh: Mega's husband, Ria's biological father. (2023–2024)
- Baby Sahana Shree as Ria: Mahesh and Mega's biological daughter, Chellamma Jr's elder sister. (2023–2024)
- Anuradha as Maragatham: Mahendran's step-mother, Thiyagarajan's illegal wife, Mega's maternal grandmother. (2022–2024)
- Minor Yogi as Manohar: Mega's maternal uncle. (2022–2024)
- Raj Kumar (2022) / Sridhar Subramaniyam (Jun.2022–2024) as Mahendran: Lakshmi's husband, Chellamma's biological father and Mega's foster father.
- Keerthana as Lakshmi Mahendran: Mahendran's wife, Chellamma's biological mother and Mega's foster mother. (2022–2024)
- Archana Kumar as Aarthi: Janaki and Vasudevan's daughter, Siddhu's sister, Akash's husband. (2022–2024)
- Baby Joyce (2022–2024) / Kiruba (2024) as Janaki: Vasudevan's wife, Siddhu and Aarthi's mother.
- Dev Anand as Vasudevan: Janaki's husband, Siddhu and Aarthi's father. (2022–2024)
- Mani as Maragatham's son (2023)
- Sridevi Ashok as Maragatham's daughter and Mega's biological mother (Dead) (Cameo)
- Ravikumar as Thiyagarajan: Mahendran's father, Maragatham's illegal husband. (2022–2024)
- Shivakumar as Akash: Aarthi's husband. (2024)
- Ashok as Saravanan: Mega and Surender's father, Ria's grandfather. (2023–2024) (Dead)

== Production ==
=== Casting ===
Newcomer actress Anshitha Akbarsha was cast as the Title role as Chellamma, who is a single mother. Arnav Amjath was cast as the male lead, who is a businessman. Arnaav made his comeback after Sun TV's Kalyana Parisu 2. Actress Divya Ganesh was selected to portray the role of Mega (Siddarth's fiancé) who played an important role, but on 13 December 2022 she quit the series. she was replaced by Sriya Surendran in December 2022.

Actor Raj Kumar was replaced by Sridhar Subramaniyam on 30 June 2022. Actress Keerthana was cast to play the role of Lakshmi. In early April 2023, Jebin John was cast opposite of Mega as Mahesh. In March 2024, actress Ranjana was cast as Pooja.

=== Soundtrack ===
Tracklist
No.	Title	Lyrics	Singer(s)	Length
1.	"Chellama Nee Chellama"	Palani Bharathi	K.S Chitra	2.57 sec

== Adaptations ==
Language	Title	Original release	Network(s)	Last aired	Notes	Ref.
Telugu	Karthika Deepam 2 కార్తీక దీపం 2	25 March 2024	Star Maa	Ongoing	Remake	
Kannada	Sharade ಶಾರದೆ	17 March 2025	Star Suvarna	Ongoing	Remake	
Hindi	Shehzaadi... Hai Tu Dil Ki शहज़ादी... है तू दिल की	4 December 2025	StarPlus	17 March 2026	Remake	
