= Chala Change Ka Chakkar =

- Country of origin: India

Original release
- Network: STAR Plus
- Release: 23 March – 6 April 2008

Chala Change Ka Chakkar is an Indian reality show, which began airing on 23 March 2008 on STAR Plus channel. The show was hosted by Shruti Seth and produced by Jainardhan Sathyan.

== Concept ==
Chala Change Ka Chakkar was essentially a role switching show. Contestants are selected to spend a day in the life of a participating celebrity; the celebrity, in turn, lives like the contestant.

=== Celebrities ===
- Mahendra Singh Dhoni -Fast Play 30 March
- Saif Ali Khan – 6 April
- Juhi Chawla – 23 March
