= Keralotsavam =

Kerala youth festival

Keralotsavam കേരളോത്സവം
- Genre: Youth Festival
- Frequency: Annually
- Venue: Kerala, India
- Country: India
- Founders: Kerala Government
- Participants: 25000
- Organiser: Kerala State Youth Welfare Board
- Website: https://keralotsavam.com

Keralotsavam is the national Youth Festival of Kerala. It is coordinated by Kerala State Youth Welfare Board. The event Organised by Government of Kerala mostly starts by November and ends generally around December. The last Keralotsavam was Keralotsavam 2021 started on 25 November 2021, and ended on 1 January 2022. Due to COVID-19, Board decided to conduct only Arts Competition for 2021 and that too online. The Online system for conducting by uploading videos and evaluating them online, First time in India for such an event, was developed by Klivolks Private Limited in a limited period of time with utmost precision.

== Nature of event ==
Keralotsavam consist of two main categories of competitions which are basically arts and sports. It includes performing arts, creative arts and Sports competitions including cricket and football. The event starts with LSGD level and occurs till National level as part of National youth festival.
