= Poulomi Das =

Indian model and television actress

- Born: Poulomi Polo Das; Kolkata, India
- Other name: Polo
- Education: St. Paul's Cathedral Mission College
- Occupations: Actress; model
- Years active: 2014–present
- Height: 5 ft 7 in (170 cm)

Poulomi Das is an Indian model and television actress. She is known for portraying the role of Baby on Star Plus's soap opera Suhani Si Ek Ladki and Purnima on Kartik Purnima Star Bharat and Swarna Shukla on Naagin 6 Colors TV.

Poulomi Das was a contestant on the second season of India's Next Top Model in 2016.

Das was a contestant on the reality TV show, Bigg Boss OTT Season 3. She entered the show on June 21, 2024.

== Career ==
In 2016 Poulomi was a contestant in the second installment of India's Next Top Model. In November 2016, it was announced that she has been cast on Suhani Si Ek Ladki as a character called Baby. after that she has been cast on Dil Hi Toh Hai as a female parallel lead character called Ananya Puri produce by Balaji Telefilms in July 2018. In 2020, she was cast in the lead role of Purnima in Star Bharat's soap opera Kartik Purnima.

She worked in a web series titled Paraushpur in December 2020. She worked as Swarna in Naagin 6 in 2023

== Filmography ==
=== Television ===
| Year | Title | Role | Notes |
|---|---|---|---|
| 2016 | India's Next Top Model (cycle 2) | Contestant | Eliminated, 7th place |
| 2016–2017 | Suhani Si Ek Ladki | Baby | an Indian romantic drama television series that aired on Star Plus from 9 June 2014 to 21 May 2017 |
| 2018–2020 | Dil Hi Toh Hai | Ananya Puri | |
| 2019 | Aghori | Asmi | |
| 2019–2020 | Baarish | Faalguni | |
| 2020 | Kartik Purnima | Purnima | |
| 2020 | Paurashpur | Kala | |
| 2021 | Bekaaboo 2 | Bidita | |
| 2021 | Hai Taubba | Kesar | |
| 2022-2023 | Naagin 6 | Swarna | |
| 2023 | Jehanabad - Of Love & War | Purnima | |
| 2024 | Bigg Boss OTT 3 | Contestant | Eliminated, 15th place |
