= Mummy Ke Superstars =

- Created by: SOL Team
- Directed by: Ashim Sen
- Presented by: Akriti Kakkar; Ali Asgar
- Judges: Shubha Mudgal; Vishal Dadlani; Shekhar Ravjiani
- Country of origin: India
- Original language: Hindi

Production
- Producer: Fazilla Allana
- Cinematography: surindra rao
- Running time: 54 minutes

Original release
- Network: StarPlus
- Release: 4 April – 27 June 2009

Amul Voice of India – Mummy Ke Superstars is an Indian television talent show for child singers on the Star Plus channel. A feature of the show is that all of the contestants are accompanied by their mothers. The show is hosted by Akriti Kakkar and Ali Asgar, with Shubha Mudgal, Vishal Dadlani and Shekhar Ravjiani as judges.
