= C.S.I. Ewart Matriculation Higher Secondary School =

C.S.I. Ewart School

Location
- 93 Dr.Allagappa Road, Purasawalkam; Chennai, Tamil Nadu 600084; India; 13°04′56″N 80°15′23″E

Information
- School type: Private, Religious
- Motto: "Love and Serve"
- Founded: 1913; 113 years ago
- School board: Matriculation
- Principal: Mrs. Emily Sujirtha Titus
- Staff: 150
- Grades: Lower Kindergarten - 12th
- Gender: Co-Ed till class 5; girls only from class 6.
- Enrollment: 3000 (2022)
- Language: English
- Campus: City
- Houses: 5
- Colors: Pink and white
- Website: csiewartschool.com

C.S.I Ewart Matriculation Higher Secondary School (Ewart, pronounced you-urt) is a private Christian school founded in 1913 in what is now Chennai, India. It gained matriculation status in 1945, and is managed by the Church of South India, Madras Diocese. The school mainly serves the communities of Purasawalkam, Vepery, Egmore, Kilpauk, Perambur, Sowcarpet. Ewart is fully accredited and is a member of the State School association. The classrooms are co-educational until 5th standard after which they become girls only.

== History ==
=== Founding ===
In 1913, the Church of England Zenana Mission began Ewart as a 'finishing school' for Indian girls. Its goal was to bring Christian values as well as the poise and etiquette of an 'English' education to students in India. The school was named Ewart after its first donator, an Irish woman, Miss Ewart. With funding secured, the school started in an old mission house in Chennai with three students on roll.

=== Development of the school ===
Miss Frances Baker was the first principal of C.S.I Ewart matric hr.sec. school, presiding over it from 1913 to 1936. In honor of her services a house, "Frances Baker House", and a wing of the school "Frances Baker Block", were named after her.

Ewart school's main auditorium, named after second principal Miss Alice Greene

The second principal of the school was Miss Alice Greene, she presided over the school from 1936 to 1952. In 1943 the school adopted the matriculation syllabus and began to offer Tamil and Hindi as second languages. The school auditorium and a house has been named after Miss Alice Green. Succeeding Miss Alice Green was Miss.C.Davamani, the third principal, who presided over the school from 1952 to 1970. She was the first Indian principal of Ewart.

The fourth principal was Mrs. C. Chelladurai (1970–1988). During her service she received both a National and State award for her leadership of the school. In 1978 the school was upgraded to the status of a Higher Secondary School.

In 2001, under the leadership of principal A. Williams, C.S.I Ewart was chosen to be one of three schools in Chennai to pilot test the Cambridge Young Learners English Tests. The test was designed by the University of Cambridge Local Examinations Syndicate (UCLES) for children aged seven to twelve in order to test a child's speaking skills.

In 2009, Sheila Lawrence became the seventh principal of Ewart. Beena Devaprasad took over as the Eighth Principal of Ewart School in 2019.

=== Principals ===
Name	Years presided	Notes
Miss Frances Baker	1913–1936	First Principal. House and building wing named after her.
Miss Alice Greene	1936–1952	House and auditorium named for her.
Miss C. Davamani	1952–1970	First Indian principal.
Miss. C. Chelladurai	1970–1988	Started use of computers in school.
Mrs. E.M. Victor	1988–1995	Began to incorporate technology in education.
Mrs Ahalya Williams	1995–2008	Received state award for teaching.
Mrs. Sheela Lawrence	2008–2019	Purchased electronic whiteboard for all classrooms, Planned and erected state of the art library in the school premises, Planning construction of school chapel in the school premises. Constructed EWART GLOBAL SCHOOL inside the school premises
Mrs. Beena Devaprasad	2019–2024	Laid Foundation for the new blocks being constructed currently. Constructed the chapel.
Emily Sujirtha Titus	2025–present	

== Ewart school culture ==
=== Events ===
==== Annual events ====
- Sports Day - annually in July, sports day is a one-day competitive event among the five houses in challenges including most track and field events, march past, bicycle races, and dance performances.
- Prize Day - In August, prizes are distributed to the winners of the events that took place during Sports Day. Other prizes, like the General proficiency prize and Best girl award, are distributed on this day.
- Pastiche is an inter-school cultural event in which 20-30 schools from Chennai participate in to win contests. It is organized by the Interact club, which consists of all the 11th std. students.
- Inter house Dramatics - The five houses compete for first place. The event provides a platform for the students to showcase their talents in acting.

==== Special events ====
Carnival, Mission sale and teacher's day

===== Definite Clean Marina Programme(1997) =====
Under the leadership of principal Mrs. A. Williams C.S.I Ewart and Citi Plus, a voluntary organization, jointly co-sponsored an effort to clean Marina beach in Chennai. 1,200 students from 25 schools picked up the litter on a half kilometre stretch on both sides of the Gandhi Statue in the Marina beach on 31 August 1997. For the next 25 weeks, students from schools continued to clean the stretch of land every weekend.

===== Vepery Science Expo (2003) =====
Between 24–25 January 2003, Ewart held a science exhibition called "Vivikta 2003" and themed "A Futuristic Clean World". During the expo Ewarts introduced its plan to clean up the school and the surrounding neighborhood as a part of its larger effort for promoting environmental awareness.

===== AIDS Awareness (2004) =====
On 23 January 2004, the school organized an interactive session on AIDS with Dr. Fuller and Dr.Libman from the United States along with three doctors from Sri Ramachandra Medical College and Research Institute. About 400 girls from standard IX to XII interacted with Jon D.Fuller and Howard Libman, associate professors from Boston University School of Medicine and Harvard Medical School. Students asked a wide range of questions from mother-to-child transmission to the origins of HIV and to the symptoms of AIDS

===== DEAR, One World Reading Together (2005) =====
(Drop Everything and Read) - On 23 December 2005, in celebration of the One World Reading Together program started in 1999 by Scholastic Publishing, Ewart Students gathered together at noon in the school auditorium and read silently. At the end of this "DEAR" time, the students yelled "C.S.I. Ewart reads for 2006" and made pledge to reading for the upcoming year.

=== Houses ===
Ewart has five houses. Students are assigned a house when they enroll in the school. Houses compete against one another in annual events such as sports day or bake sales.

Name of house	House color	Nickname
Pandita Ramabai		Pandits
Helen Keller		Kellers
Marie Curie		Curies
Frances Baker		Bakers
Alice Greene		Greens

== Awards ==
=== Teacher awards ===
Year	Teacher	State/National Award
1979	Miss L. Asirvatham	State
1982	Mrs. C. Chelladurai	State
1985	Mrs. R. Frederick	State
1987	Mrs.C.Chelladurai	National
1988	Mrs.L.Sahayaraj	National
1990	Mrs. A. Lucas	State
1991	Mrs. D. Ebenezer	State
1998	Mrs. L. Ramamurthy	State
2000	Mrs. Ahalya Williams	State
2025	Mrs. Emily Sujirtha Titus	State

=== SEED School Network Program Grant ===
In 2000, Ewartr received donated computer networking materials and a grant from the SEED organization to help improve the technology in the school. The SEED School Network Program offers to disadvantaged schools located in developing countries the financial and technical assistance needed to connect them to the Internet. Ewart used the grant money to set up a computer center and to train teachers on operating Windows 95, NT, and MS-Office. Ms. Mallika Ranjan lead the development, organization, and deployment of the new IT system at Ewart.

=== Ford Conservation and Environmental Grant ===
C.S.I Ewart was one of three schools awarded the Ford Conservation and Environmental Grant in November 2001. The total grant amount of Rs. 15 lakhs was distributed among the winners to support projects which aimed at preservation of their immediate environment and natural resources. Ewart's winning project proposal was titled 'Proliferating Vermiculture Practice by Community Participation,' and aimed to incorporate vermiculture units on camps to battle environmental pollution.

== C.S.I. Ewart Global School ==
From January 2018, there's another school started inside the campus with a name C.S.I. Ewart Global School. This new school is affiliated to the CBSE board.
