= Star Suvarna =

Indian Kannada-language television channel

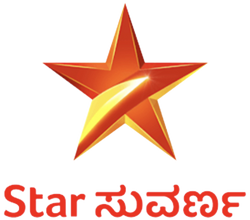
- Logo used since 2023
- Type: television channel
- Country: India
- Broadcast area: India
- Network: JioStar
- Headquarters: Bengaluru, Karnataka

Programming
- Language: Kannada
- Picture format: 1080p HDTV

Ownership
- Owner: JioStar
- Sister channels: Star Suvarna Plus; JioStar channels

History
- Launched: 17 June 2007; 19 years ago
- Former names: Asianet Suvarna (2007–2016)

Links
- Website: Star Suvarna on JioHotstar

Availability

Streaming media
- JioHotstar: (India)

Star Suvarna (formerly Asianet Suvarna) is an Indian Kannada language general entertainment pay television channel owned by JioStar, a joint venture between Viacom18 and Disney India. It primarily telecast programmes such as serials, reality shows & Kannada films.

== History ==
It was launched on 17 June 2007 by Jupiter Entertainment Venture (JEV) as Asianet Suvarna owned by Asianet Communications Limited.

Star Suvarna is also the first channel in India to give importance to Tulu language programming during the year 2010 despite the channel being known for Kannada language programming.

In 2013, Star India acquired Asianet Communications excluding the news channels from their parent company. Suvarna Plus was launched on 14 August 2013. On 25 July 2016, the channel was rebranded as Star Suvarna along with its sister channel Star Suvarna Plus.

Star Suvarna launched its own high-definition simulcast, with HD visuals and Dolby Digital Plus 5.1 sound quality on 15 July 2017.

== Sister channel ==
=== Star Suvarna Plus ===
Star Suvarna Plus is an Indian Kannada-language movie channel owned by JioStar, a Joint Venture between Viacom18 and Disney India. It was launched on 14 August 2013, as Asianet Suvarna Plus. On 25 July 2017, it was rebranded as Star Suvarna Plus.

== Current broadcasts ==
=== Drama series ===
Premiere date	Name	Adaptation of	Ref.
17 March 2025	Sharade	Tamil TV Series Chellamma	
11 December 2023	Aase	Tamil TV Series Siragadikka Aasai	
13 November 2023	Gowri Shankara	Hindi TV series Mann Kee Awaaz Pratigya	
30 September 2024	Ninna Jothe Nanna Kathe		
26 April 2025	Snehada Kadalali	Malayalam TV series Snehakkoottu	
15 September 2025	Vasudeva Kutumba	Tamil TV series Mahanadhi	
4 August 2025	Nee Iralu Joteyalli	Tamil TV series Deivamagal	
20 January 2026	Jai Lalitha	Hindi TV Series Nimki Mukhiya	
25 May 2026	Maryadhe Ramanna	Bengali TV series Khokababu	

== Former broadcasts ==
=== Drama series ===
Premiere date	Series	Last aired	Adaptation of
9 June 2008	Shivaleelamrutha	14 August 2009	
24 August 2009	Parijatha	11 December 2009	
16 November 2009	Idhre Irabeku Ninahanga	14 May 2010	
2 August 2010	Ellaranthalla Namma Raaji	15 October 2010	
18 October 2010	Beedige Biddavaru	10 December 2010	
13 December 2010	Bombeyatavayya	29 April 2011	
16 April 2012	Chukki	7 December 2013	
30 July 2012	Akashadeepa	21 June 2014	Hindi TV series Diya Aur Baati Hum
25 July 2016	Hara Hara Mahadeva	21 March 2018	Hindi TV series Devon Ke Dev...Mahadev
22 January 2018	Muddulakshmi	25 August 2023	Malayalam TV series Karuthamuthu
30 July 2018	Sarvamangala Mangalye	3 April 2020	Hindi TV series Tu Sooraj Main Saanjh, Piyaji
4 March 2024	Lakshmi Tiffin Room	29 March 2024	Hindi TV series Diya Aur Baati Hum
28 August 2023	Kaveri Kannada Medium	2 March 2025	Bengali TV series Bangla Medium
17 March 2025	Sharade	2 August 2025	Tamil TV series Chellamma
23 January 2023	Udho Udho Sri Renuka Yellamma	24 May 2025	

=== Reality shows ===
- Cookku with Kirikku
- Dance Dance (seasons 1–2)
- Kannadada Kotyadhipati (seasons 1–3)
