= Tod Kar Dil Mera =

2026 Indian television series

- Genre: Drama; Romance; Betrayal
- Directed by: Amit Kumar Jha
- Starring: Anurima Chakraborty; Ashish Raghav
- Country of origin: India
- Original language: Hindi
- No. of seasons: 1
- No. of episodes: 132

Production
- Producer: Sachin Pandey
- Camera setup: Multi-camera
- Running time: 20-21 minutes
- Production company: Bombay Shows Studio

Original release
- Network: StarPlus
- Release: 19 January – 31 May 2026

Related
- Thukra Ke Mera Pyaar

Tod Kar Dil Mera (transl. After Breaking My Heart) is an Indian Hindi-language romantic drama television series which premiered on 19 January 2026 to 31 May 2026 on StarPlus and streams digitally on JioHotstar. Produced under Bombay Shows Studio, it starred Anurima Chakraborty and Ashish Raghav.

== Plot ==
Set in Lucknow, the series follows Raj S. Ranjan, a middle-class clerk who marries Advocate Raushni Srivastava in an arranged marriage. Despite the circumstances, the two quickly fall in love. Raj lives with his conservative family, which includes his mother Sumitra, his sister Ritika, and his younger brother Mayank. After marriage, Raushni chooses to prioritize her married life and becomes a homemaker.

Raushni learns about Raj's unfulfilled dream of becoming an IAS officer, a wish once held by his late father. Raj had been an IAS aspirant but was forced to abandon his plans after his father died of a heart attack, after which he took up his father's job to support the family. When Mayank is framed in a violent case, Raushni represents him as an advocate with Sumitra's permission but is threatened into deliberately losing the case to prevent him from being falsely accused of a more serious crime involving a woman named Keerti. Unaware of the truth, Mayank begins to resent Raushni. Around the same time, Sumitra is diagnosed with lung carcinoma but hides her illness. Impressed by Raushni's dedication, Sumitra allows Raj to leave his job and prepare for the UPSC examination.

While Raj studies, Raushni manages the household and helps Ritika gain confidence. Raushni and Sumitra develop a close bond before Sumitra eventually passes away. On the same day, Raj receives the news that he has cleared the UPSC examination and is appointed as an IAS officer. Raj then leaves for a three-year training program, where he meets fellow trainee Meghna Gupta. Over time, Raj grows close to Meghna. Meanwhile, Raushni becomes pregnant with Raj's child, but Raj tells her to abort the child. His reaction causes her severe stress, resulting in a miscarriage and the inability to ever conceive again. During Raj's training, the couple's relationship gradually weakens.

Upon completing his training, Raj sends Raushni divorce papers. After initially refusing to respond, she eventually learns about his affair with Meghna and agrees to the divorce. Following several counselling sessions and court proceedings, Raj and Raushni separate, and Raj later marries Meghna. Meanwhile, Mayank receives political backing from a businessman named Vikrant Rathore, who is supported by Meghna's father K.K. Gupta. Mayank becomes a corporator after murdering his political opponent. Raushni purchases the Ranjan house from its owner despite opposition from Raj and Mayank. Mayank marries Keerti, who is later revealed to be involved in criminal activities such as honey-trapping and money extortion. Ritika supports Raushni and eventually becomes a lawyer like her. Honoring the promise she made to Sumitra, Raushni accepts Meghna as the new daughter-in-law of the Ranjan family and performs the rituals welcoming her into the household. Over time, Raushni and Meghna develop a friendship.

Raushni's law firm is later assigned to handle pending cases under Raj's jurisdiction. Along with her friend Isha, she investigates a bridge collapse that caused multiple deaths. The investigation reveals that Mayank, Vikrant, Rammoorthy, the contractor, and Raj were involved in corruption. During the investigation, Isha is murdered, leaving Raushni devastated. Determined to seek justice for her friend, she resolves to uncover the truth and hold those responsible accountable. With the help of Ritika and police officer Kartik Tyagi, and with Meghna’s support, Raushni begins investigating Isha’s murder. Following the clues Isha left behind, she uncovers that Isha had gathered strong evidence in the bridge collapse case, which ultimately led to her being killed by Mayank. Ujjwal, once Mayank’s trusted aide but now Raushni’s confidant, steps forward and testifies against Mayank, exposing his crimes. Additionally, a recording of Rammoorthy’s final words implicates Mayank, Raj, and Vikrant, further strengthening the case. As a result, Mayank is convicted and sentenced to life imprisonment. Raj is dismissed from his position and faces a departmental investigation for his involvement. Meanwhile, Raushni is promoted to the position of a judge and is appointed to the District Court. In a twist of fate, Raj’s case is reassigned, with Raushni presiding as the main judge. Ritika, deeply shaken by Mayank’s arrest and Raj’s downfall, struggles emotionally but still hopes for Raj’s redemption. Around the same time, Meghna is revealed to be pregnant. However, she chooses to leave Raj and moves into the Ranjan house, where she begins living with Raushni and her family. Over time, Raushni and Meghna develop a deep bond and become best friends. Meghna gives birth to a daughter, Jr. Sumitra, but tragically passes away a few minutes after childbirth. Before her death, she entrusts all parental rights of her daughter to Raushni and asks Raj to stay away from her daughter. Raushni honors Meghna’s final wish. Weeks later, Raj files for custody of Jr. Sumitra. Due to Ritika refusing to testify in Raushni’s favor, Raj ultimately wins custody of the child. Meanwhile, as investigations into corruption deepen, Vikrant Rathore and K.K. Gupta shift the blame onto Raj, framing him for their own crimes as well. Raj is subsequently sentenced to two years in prison as punishment for his actions. During this time, Sid, who had been held captive by sea pirates for several months, is finally rescued and reunites with Ritika. In the prison, Mayank, who had a change of heart, apologises to Raushni and stays with Raj as an inmate after Raj's aged inmate dies. Raj has a change of heart in the prison.

Two years later, Raj is released from prison after completing his sentence and returns to the Ranjan house. With Raushni and Raj’s approval, Ritika and Sid decide to get married. Having changed as a person, Raj once again asks Raushni for her companionship and a chance to rebuild their relationship. However, Raushni refuses, choosing instead to stand firm in her own path. Over Ritika's wedding preparations, Raj tries to persuade Raushni with the seven vows given to her. Raushni, before the wedding night, firmly refuses. A heartbroken Raj leaves the house. Over the night, Raushni realises Raj's changed behaviour and decides to reconcile but he has already left. Ritika's wedding gets postponed and Raj is presumed to be dead and his final rites are performed. Raushni is persuaded by Ritika and Mayank to punish K.K. Gupta and Vikrant Rathore for their crimes and provides evidence against them with Ritika as the lawyer.

Seven years later, life has moved on. Ritika and Sid are married and live in the Ranjan house. Jr. Sumitra yearns for her father. Keerti returns to the Ranjan house with her and Mayank's son Vishesh. Mayank is released from jail for his good behavior. Raj is revealed to be alive near Kanpur who has given up his leisurely life and teaches UPSC aspirants for free. Jr. Sumitra's teacher, Sameer, comes as a tenant to the house of Raushni's neighbour Jagrani. He develops a deep bond with Jr. Sumitra. Meanwhile, a man named Bhagwant protests against Raushni's decisions in court, due to which the court panel removes her. It is revealed that Keerti is also working with Bhagwant to conspire against Raushni. They are working under an unknown leader. As Jr. Sumitra keeps demanding Raushni for a father, Raushni's family tries to convince her to marry Sameer. Raushni eventually agrees to marry Sameer. Raj's student Bittu clears UPSC. On Raushni's engagement day with Sameer, Bittu goes to tell this good news to Raushni, having known her when he was a child. Raushni sees a video of Raj in Bittu's phone, and realises that Raj is still alive. Along with Mayank, Ritika, and Jr. Sumitra, she goes to Raj's village and convinces Raj to return to the Ranjan house. Raj agrees and returns along with them. As Raj is revealed to be alive, Sameer cancels his engagement to Raushni and promises to always be her good friend. Jr. Sumitra refuses to accept Raj and wants Sameer to be her father, but Raushni wants to marry Raj. Later, Raj tries to win Jr. Sumitra's trust by playing with her and Vishesh, and travelling with her, but she still wants Sameer as her father. Meanwhile, Bhagwant convinces Rammoorthy's son Angad to join him in conspiring against Raushni. Raj asks Sameer to marry Raushni, but Sameer refuses. Eventually, Raj and Raushni get married, and Jr. Sumitra accepts Raj as her father on Sameer's request. After their marriage, it is revealed that Raj is still evil, and is the leader of the conspiracy against Raushni to get her impeached from the position of judge, with Bhagwant, Keerti, Angad, and K.K. Gupta as members of his team. Raj takes Raushni outside using the excuse of eating Biryani to get her stabbed by a disguised Angad. One week later, Kartik gives her a gun for self-defense. Meanwhile, Raushni is given ten days to justify her decisions that she gave as a judge, which might stop her impeachment. But Raj tampers with her files, which makes Raushni's opportunity fail. Raushni's health deteriorates and she falls into depression. The doctor advises her not to take stress. Mayank starts suspecting that Raj is involved in the conspiracy against Raushni after seeing Raj talk to Keerti. Raushni gets impeached and is labelled as mentally ill, which shatters her. Later, Mayank talks to Raushni and both have suspicion on Keerti. They plan to do a fake fight so that Mayank talks to Keerti and she tells Mayank about her leader, but their plan fails as Raj overhears them and tells Keerti not to tell anything to Mayank. Their fake fight makes the family think that Raushni's mental health has deteriorated, and they think of sending her to asylum. Later, Sameer joins Raushni and Mayank, and follows Keerti as part of the plan. He records Keerti talking to Bhagwant, Angad, and K.K., and sends it to Raushni, hence confirming their involvement in the conspiracy against Raushni. Raj meets his team members and expresses his wish to kill Raushni and make it look like suicide, which even K.K. finds to be too cruel. Later, Raushni tells Raj that K.K. Gupta is involved in her impeachment, and goes to confront K.K. He tells Raushni that there is a mastermind who is leading all this. Just as he is about to say Raj's name, Raj secretly shoots him dead using Raushni's gun. The next morning, Raushni realises that Raj is the mastermind after thinking for a while. She tells Ritika about this, but Ritika refuses to believe her. Then Raushni confronts Raj, who reveals that he planned this all to destroy her and take revenge from her. He tells her to prepare for Karva Chauth, pray for his long life and die. Raushni is left completely broken. She sees a vision of her deceased mother-in-law Sumitra motivating her. Later that day, Raushni shoots Raj dead and sees a vision of Sumitra nodding in approval.

A few years later, Keerti rides off somewhere on her motorcycle. Raushni is released from asylum. Sameer and an adolescent Jr. Sumitra come to pick Raushni up from asylum and they have a reunion.

== Cast ==
- Anurima Chakraborty as Justice Raushni Ranjan (née Srivastava): Anita's and Mr. Srivastava's elder daughter; Rimjhim's sister; Raj's widow and murderer; Jr. Sumitra's step-mother (2026)
- Ashish Raghav as IAS Raj S. Ranjan: Sumitra and Mr. Ranjan's elder son; Mayank and Ritika's brother; Raushni's husband, Meghna's widower; Jr. Sumitra's father (2026) (Dead)
- Sakshi Parihar as IAS Meghna Raj Ranjan (née Gupta): K.K.'s daughter; Raj's second wife, Jr. Sumitra's mother (2026) (Dead)
- Aashvi Bisht as Advocate Ritika S. Ranjan: Sumitra and Mr. Ranjan's daughter; Raj and Mayank's younger sister; Sid's wife (2026)
- Unknown as Sid: Ritika's husband (2026)
- Vibhav Mishra as Corporater Mayank Ranjan: Sumitra and Mr. Ranjan's younger son; Raj and Ritika's brother; Keerti's husband; Vishesh's father (2026)
- Unknown as K.K. Gupta: Meghna's father; Jr. Sumitra's grandfather (2026) (Dead)
- Tulika Banerjee as Sumitra Ranjan: Mr. Ranjan's widow; Raj, Mayank and Ritika's mother; Jr. Sumitra's grandmother (2026) (Dead)
- Unknown as Mr. Ranjan: Sumitra's husband; Raj, Mayank and Ritika's father; Jr. Sumitra's grandfather (2026 – Flashbacks only) (Dead)
- Kiara Sharma as Jr. Sumitra: Raj and Meghna's daughter, Raushni's step daughter (2026)
- Garima Kapoor as Keerti Ranjan: Mayank's wife, Vishesh's mother (2026)
- Samrat as Vishesh Ranjan: Mayank and Keerti's son (2026)
- Abhin as Sameer: Jr. Sumitra's teacher, Raushni's ex-fiancé (2026)
- Sushant Chandra Pandey as Advocate Shashwat: Raushni's friend, colleague and one sided lover (2026)
- Farhana Fatema as Anita Srivastava: Mr. Srivastava's widow; Raushni and Rimjhim's mother; Jr Sumitra's step grandmother (2026)
- Unknown as Mr. Srivastava: Anita's husband; Raushni and Rimjhim's father; Jr. Sumitra's step grandfather (2026) (Dead)
- Unknown as Rimjhim Srivastava: Anita and Mr. Srivastava's younger daughter; Raushni's sister (2026)
- Annu Awasthi as Anand: Sumitra's brother; Raj, Mayank and Ritika's maternal uncle (2026)
- Pradeep Shivhare as Ujjwal: Mayank's friend (2026)
- Krishi Pandya as Tanvi: Raushni's friend (2026)
- Anshi Yadav as Ritika's friend in the college (2026)

== Production ==
The series was announced by Bombay Shows Studio on StarPlus. It was initially titled Tod Kar Dil Mera... Hua Sab Tera. Anurima Chakraborty and Ashish Raghav were signed as the lead. Later on, Sakshi Parihar joined the cast. Principal photography of the series commenced in October 2025 and wrapped up in February 2026. The filming took place in Lucknow.

== Release ==
The series is set against the backdrop of Lucknow. The promo featuring the leads was released on 8 January 2026. The cast promoted the series Mohanlalganj and Lucknow.

The series was made available for streaming on JioHotstar and received mixed reviews from critics.
