= Kartik Purnima (TV series) =

- Genre: Drama
- Created by: Bhupinder Singh; Sanjot Kaur
- Written by: Pearl Gray; Raghuvir Shekhawat; Lakshmi Jaykumar
- Directed by: Ravidra Gautam; Devashish Dhar; Sachin Kanna
- Creative director: Rohit K Mukherjee
- Country of origin: India
- Original language: Hindi
- No. of episodes: 45

Production
- Camera setup: Multi-camera
- Running time: 22 minutes

Original release
- Network: Star Bharat
- Release: 3 February – 27 March 2020

Kartik Purnima is an Indian Hindi-language social drama television series, which premiered on 3 February 2020 on Star Bharat. It stars Poulomi Das who plays the role of a girl who has a dusky complexion who has to fight the social norm of not being fair-skinned in India. It is a remake of the Malayalam Asianet series Karuthamuthu.

The show was halted abruptly due to the COVID-19 pandemic lockdown in India on 27 March 2020. Later, it was announced that the show will not be brought back after lockdown due to Star Bharat channel revamp due to low viewership which lead the show to an abrupt ending.

== Plot ==
Purnima was treated unfairly from a young age because of her dark complexion. One day, young Purnima gives her trophy for the student of the year to her fair-complexioned half-sister, Shanaya, but is later caught as someone comes from her school revealing the truth. Purnima's father stands for Purnima and asks Shanaya to apologise but she refuses. Later, her stepmother, who prefers her own daughter, abandons young Purnima at the Golden Temple. In search of her mother, young Purnima meets young Kartik who gives her a bangle saying the bracelet will give her protection. Kartik's mother gets angry as her son is talking to a girl of dark complexion and middle-class. Purnima, nonetheless, reaches home and takes the blame of wandering around. Her father talks to her about how the way you act matters more than the colour of someone's skin complexion.

Purnima and Kartik are now adults. Kartik is a doctor who loves volunteering at the temple's footwear storage. While taking Purnima's footwear, he notices the bangle. Kartik's mother, Soni, hates dark complexion as she is the owner of a fairness beauty brand and wishes for a fairy-like girl, fair complexion is a must. Purnima prays for her sister who is taking part in Miss Amritsar beauty. Purnima calls Shanaya and gives her a definition of beauty that was given to her by her father. Kartik overhears Purnima while he is consulting a patient and gets impressed by her thoughtfulness. Like the Arora sisters, the Mehra brothers have different definitions of beauty. When questioned by Soni, a judge at the show, Shanaya gives the exacts same words Purnima told her and she wins 1st place. Kartik realises the similarity and concludes that Purnima might be nearby. Soni chooses Shanaya as her future daughter-in-law. Sometime later, Kartik spots Purnima who was with her other family members. Soni sees her son and asks him what he was looking at. He points to Purnima, but Soni sees Shanaya. Purnima also teaches some kids Maths and English.

Next morning, Soni and Sumreet, Kartik's brother, express their choices that match, both being Shanaya. Soni is also very diet conscious. Soni plans on making Shanaya face for the company's new product. A boy comes for a marriage proposal for Purnima but they reject her due to her complexion. Shanaya needs money for another contest, Miss Punjab. Shanaya steals Purnima's money which the latter collected since childhood. Shanaya gets caught as one of her nails gets found near Purnima's belongings but she has already used the stolen money for her next contest.

Purnima finds a small girl hurt on the road and the people surrounding the little kid are of no help, some are even filming. Purnima sacrifices her school fees for the girl and donates some of her blood to her. Purnima bumps into Soni and Soni is disgusted. Soni sends a marriage proposal for Shanaya. Shanaya tells her mother that she does not like the idea of marriage. Shanaya misunderstands the groom as only the two brothers are sent there. Her choice is Kartik and not Sumreet. Beena tries to convince her, but in no vain. Later, Soni questions Kartik about Purnima's book. Later, the family is visiting the temple and Shanaya makes a charade that her foot has been sprained. Shanaya gets rid of Purnima and throws a party at her house, the occasion is her marriage with Kartik. Purnima finds out about this and stops the party. She slaps Shanaya. Shanaya makes another charade, making her mother slap Purnima and throw her outside the house. Kuldeep returns the next morning finding Purnima sleeping outside. Kuldeep finds out the truth and as usual, Shanaya refuses to apologise. Kartik convinces Soni to go and visit the Aroras. When Soni visits the Aroras, she comes 30 mins beforehand and Purnima mistakenly gets some water on Soni. Soni treats Purnima as a maid (Purnima's father was not at home when this happened). Shanaya is not at home when Soni visits and goes to meet Kartik. Shanaya confesses to Kartik. Beena tells Shanaya about Soni's wish (Shanaya should not take part in Miss Punjab contest) and Shanaya refuses to abide. Shanaya also tells Beena that she confessed to Kartik. Soni fixes Shanaya's and Sumreet's engagement. Kartik and Purnima had a near accident situation where a sobbing Purnima told Kartik that he is a liar. Kartik thinks about this overnight and gets Purnima's information from her eye donation form. He calls Purnima and Shanaya tells the family that her boyfriend called her. Purnima shuts Beena up as she starts questioning her character. Kartik was heading to find Purnima's house and on the way, he finds a hurt Kuldeep. Outside the house, Kartik and Purnima bump into each other. Kartik notices his bracelet on Purnima's hand.

Sumreet calls Kartik to help him choose a ring for engagement. Kartik asks Sumreet to call Shanaya to ask if Shanaya is happy about the marriage. Shanaya says she is happy thus making Kartik more confused. The females of the families go shopping for Shanaya's engagement outfit. Soni forgot her wallet and Kartik drops it by. He spots Purnima at the shop choosing some outfits for herself. The outfit is expensive and Purnima cannot afford it. Kartik overhears the shop attendant's comment which was offending and scolds him. Kartik buys the outfit. Purnima is given a lot of outfits to carry and she slips most of them on Soni. She is forced to apologise and refer to Soni as "Madam". Purnima receives the outfit and mother-daughter duo don't leave a chance to not question Purnima's character.

Soni hatches a plan against Purnima, calling her to the Mehras to help in the engagement arrangements and then humiliating her. While cleaning some rooms, Purnima enters Kartik's room, she realises that it's Kartik's room after seeing a picture of Kartik and Soni. Soni tells Purnima to change curtains and Purnima falls onto Kartik as she can't balance herself. Soni was about to slap Purnima but Kartik stopped her. While going to the Mehra's mansion for engagement, Beena mistakenly drops the ring which Purnima finds while talking with the children she teaches. Beena realises that and Kartik volunteers to go fetch it. Luckily, Purnima is already there with the ring. As Purnima was returning home, she notices fire on Beena's saree and runs to save her. While doing this, Soni finds out Purnima is the family's elder daughter. At home, Purnima defends Beena when Kuldeep rebukes her for hiding the truth from the Mehras. When Soni is in deep thought in her room, a flashback is shown where a woman is teaching her younger version that dark-skinned people are not trustworthy. Sometime later, Kartik reaches the Arora's house and bumps into Purnima who was heading to the Mehras. The two finally have a decent conversation. Kartik pacified the Aroras while Purnima successfully invites Soni for prayer at her house. When Kartik was returning home, Shanaya purposefully drops juice on him. She tried to take advantage of him but the grandma saved the day.

On the day of the prayer, Soni cancels all her appointments and tells the family to prepare for the prayer. Kartik gets suspicious as he knows his mom would never do that. The Mehras are all prepared including Kartik but Kartik gets an emergency call from the hospital. The prayer items Soni brought with her are all in black instead of their usual colour. Soni breaks the marriage of Sumreet and Shanaya and does not leave before blaming Purnima for everything. Kuldeep suffers a heart attack. Kartik receives all information of what happened through Sumreet. Thankfully, Kartik is at the hospital and looks after Kuldeep.

Sumreet and Soni have a heated argument which forced Sumreet to take the drastic decision of marrying Shanaya by eloping. Purnima sees the two and calls Kartik. Purnima and Kartik stop them. Soni accepts the marriage but with some unethical demands. Kuldeep at first rejects this but later agrees by putting forth his condition that Purnima should get married too. Later at the temple, Kartik reveals to Purnima that the bangle is his. Next, is Purnima attending the birthday celebration of one of her students, where both Purnima and Kartik have fun. Purnima unintentionally scratches Kartik's car and Kartik tells her she can repay him with a cup of coffee. To repay him, Purnima goes to his hospital where the two meet with an emergency. A small girl has a tumour in her belly but her superstitious family members don't let the operation happen. Kartik meets the Aroras to ask for Purnima's help to rescue the little girl. The two go to the village pose as husband and wife and successfully carry out their mission. This reaches Soni's ears. Soni and Purnima meet where Purnima calls out Soni's obsession with colours.

After her meeting with Soni, Purnima helps a girl on the road. When she is in trouble, a new character, Vicky, enters. During that time, Sumreet wants to celebrate his and Shanaya's one month anniversary. Instead of Sumreet and Shanaya, the event becomes Kartik and Purnima's date.

Vicky brings a marriage proposal for Purnima and the girl accepts. But this guy has ulterior motives other than being planted by Beena. He transferred Purnima's property on his name and plans to dump her like his other victims. Kartik finds out about this and tells everything to Kuldeep while at the Aroras, Vicky tries to molest Purnima.

== Cast ==
=== Main ===
- Poulomi Das as Purnima Arora: Kuldeep's daughter; Beena's step daughter; Shanaya's half-sister; Kartik's love interest
- Harsh Nagar as Kartik Mehra: Soni's son; Sumreet's brother; Purnima's love interest
- Kavita Ghai as Soni Mehra: Kartik and Sumreet's mother
- Prapti Shukla as Twinkle Mehra

=== Recurring ===
- Ravi Gossain as Kuldeep Arora: Purnima and Shanaya's father; Beena's husband
- Meenakshi Verma as Beeji: Kuldeep's mother; Purnima and Shanaya's grandmother
- Nidhi Shah as Shanaya "Shanu" Arora: Kuldeep and Beena's daughter; Purnima's half-sister; Sumreet's wife
- Chirag Mahbubani as Sumreet Mehra: Soni's son; Karthik's brother; Shanaya's husband
- Shraddha Jaiswal as Babli: Kartik's aunt
- Ahmad Harhash as Kartik Singh: Babli's brother
