= Imran Nazir =

Imran Nazir may refer to:

- Imran Nazir (cricketer), Pakistani cricketer
- Imran Nazir (politician), Pakistani politician
- Imran Nazir (writer), Pakistani writer
- Imran Nazir Khan, Indian actor
