= Love Express =

- Directed by: Sunny Bhambani
- Produced by: Subhash Ghai
- Starring: Sahil Mehta; Mannat Ravi; Vikas Katyal; Priyum Galav
- Cinematography: Kabir Lal
- Music by: Jaidev
- Distributed by: Mukta Arts
- Release date: 10 June 2011
- Country: India
- Language: Hindi

Love Express is a 2011 Hindi romantic comedy film directed by Sunny Bhambani and produced by Subhash Ghai. The film is set to release under the Mukta Arts banner. Shooting of the film began on 18 July 2010.

== Plot ==
Love Express tells the story of two Punjabi families who have known each other for 30 years and are trying to have wedding during a train journey. When the bride and groom don't like each other and secretly plan to cancel the wedding, the two families call off the wedding. The fun begins when the bride and groom start liking each other and fall in love. Will they get together or will 30 years of friendship be destroyed by these chain of events?

== Cast ==
- Sahil Mehta
- Mannat Ravi (Neha Yadav)
- Vikas Katyal
- Priyum Galav
- Om Puri
- Taran Bajaj as Balli

== Reception ==
A critic from The Times of India wrote that "Most of the stories have no substance". A critic from Koimoi opined that "On the whole, Love Express does not entertain at all because as a film, it fails to express anything". On the contrary, a critic from Behindwoods wrote that "For the first film made by students of film direction and acting, this is a laudable effort which hopefully will only get better".
