= Ikyawann =

- Genre: Drama
- Created by: Manasvi Arya
- Written by: Manasvi Arya Akash Deep
- Directed by: Ismail Umar Khan; Amandeep singh Paritosh Sanjeev Babbar
- Starring: Prachi Tehlan; Namish Taneja
- Country of origin: India
- Original language: Hindi
- No. of seasons: 1
- No. of episodes: 155

Production
- Producers: Suzana Ghai; Hemant Ruprell; Ranjeet Thakur
- Production locations: Ahmedabad; Mumbai
- Camera setup: Multi camera
- Running time: 22 minutes
- Production company: Panorama Entertainment

Original release
- Network: StarPlus
- Release: 13 November 2017 – 1 June 2018

Ikyawann (transl. Fifty-One) is an Indian television series that was broadcast on StarPlus and made available to stream on Hotstar. It premiered on 13 November 2017. The show starred Prachi Tehlan and Namish Taneja. The show is set in Ahmedabad, and produced by Suzana Ghai. It was replaced by A Game Show named Sabse Smart Kaun? from 4 June 2018.

== Synopsis ==
The story of the show follows the stories of to warring families - the Ajmeras and the Parekhs.

Susheel Parekh (Prachi Tehlan) is the 51st child of the Parekh family where all female members were killed years ago in a road accident. Susheel grows up with her father Mehul, her grandfather, and two uncles who believe she is auspicious. The accident had been planned by Leela Ajmera who wanted to take revenge from Mehul for having rejected her daughter Kiran. The Parekhs move away to Surat to start a new life.

Years later, Susheel grows up to be a strong woman encouraged by her family. Satya Ajmera (Namish Taneja) is Leela's grandson. Satya and Susheel run into each other in Surat and get into a fight where Satya is hurt. Wanting to get back at the girl who hurt her grandson, Leela sets out to look for her unaware that she is Mehul's daughter.

== Cast ==
=== Main ===
- Prachi Tehlan as Susheel Parekh Ajmera; Satya's wife, 51st child of the Parekh family, a sweet, loving and simple girl, who is more masculine in her mannerisms and interests.
  - Jagrati Sethia as Young Susheel Parekh; 51st child of the Parekh family, Straight Forward and Innocent girl, who is more masculine in her mannerisms and interests.
- Namish Taneja as Satya Ajmera, Susheel's husband, Leela's grandson. He is a handsome and arrogant guy. He is much loved and valued by his family. He can’t see anyone better than him.

=== Recurring ===
- Rajshri Rani as Sarthi Mishra, also known as Fighter Didi, Susheel's kushti trainer, a self-defence trainer
- Kavita Vaid as Leela Ajmera, Satya and Vishu's grandmother
- Priyank Tatariya as Mehul Parekh, Susheel's father
- Pallavi Bharti as Kali Ajmera, Leela’s youngest daughter-in-law and Satya’s mother
- Neha Yadav as Sejal Ajmera, Vishu's wife
- Sidharth Banerjee as Sid
- Anwar Fatehan as Banke Parekh, Susheel's grandfather
- Nabeel Ahmed as Jiggy, Satya's cousin
- Puneet Panjwani as Naresh Parekh, Susheel's maternal uncle
- Jai Vats as Nitish Parekh, Susheel's paternal uncle
- Komal Dhillon as Kiran Ajmera, Leela's daughter who was rejected by Mehul
- Akshita Arora as Jhano, Leela's domestic help
- Poonam Pandey as Soumya
- Urmimala Sinha Roy as Susheel's friend
- Ahmad Harhash as Runo Singh Jhano’s help

== Development ==
The shooting location at Manek Chowk, Ahmedabad, Gujarat

On 23 October 2017, the first promo of the show was released, with the opening song Khushkhabri Hai Papa. On 28 October 2017, the second promo of the show was released, with the title song of Ikyawann. The shooting for the show began in June 2017 at Manek Chowk, Ahmedabad, Gujarat. The college scenes were shot in St. Xavier's College at Navrangpura, Ahmedabad. Namish had talked about his college life character and he adds, "He is the most handsome guy in the college. Since he doesn't want to join his father's business, he keeps failing in his exams."
