= Titli =

Titli can refer to:

- Titli (2002 film), an Indian Bengali-language film
- Titli (2014 film), an Indian Hindi-language film
- "Titli", a song from the 2013 Indian film, Chennai Express
- Titli (2017 TV series), a Pakistani serial drama
- Titli (2020 TV series), an Indian television drama
- Titli (2023 TV series), an Indian thriller drama television series

== See also ==
- Titlis, a mountain in the Swiss Alps
