= Sahil Mehta =

Sahil Mehta may refer to:

- Sahil Mehta (actor, born 1988), Indian television actor
- Sahil Mehta (actor, born 1997), Indian film actor
