= Muramba (TV series) =

2022 Indian Marathi language TV series

- Genre: Family drama
- Screenplay by: Manaswini Lata Ravindra; Sameer Garud
- Directed by: Sushant Shashikant Pol
- Creative director: Akshay Vaishali Suresh
- Starring: See below
- Theme music composer: Nilesh Moharir; Shashank Powar
- Country of origin: India
- Original language: Marathi
- No. of episodes: 1408

Production
- Executive producer: Ashwini Ingale
- Producer: Suzana Ghai
- Cinematography: Abhishek Narendra Gandhi
- Camera setup: Multi-camera
- Running time: 22 minutes
- Production company: Panorama Entertainment Pvt.Ltd.

Original release
- Network: Star Pravah
- Release: 14 February 2022 – 28 June 2026

Related
- Suhani Si Ek Ladki

Muramba (transl. Marmalade) is an Indian Marathi language TV series which premiered from 14 February 2022 aired on Star Pravah. It stars Shashank Ketkar, Shivani Mundhekar and Nishani Borule in lead roles. The show is produced by Panorama Entertainment Pvt. Ltd. This show is an official remake of Star Plus TV series Suhani Si Ek Ladki.

== Plot ==
It is the story of two best friends who are willing to go to any length for each other. Their friendship takes a new turn when the two pals fall in love with the same guy.

== Cast ==
=== Main ===
- Shashank Ketkar as Akshay Shashikant Mukadam
- Shivani Mundhekar as Rama Devsthali / Rama Akshay Mukadam / Rama Karnik
- Nishani Borule as Reva Rajadhyaksha

=== Recurring ===
Mukadam family

- Aarambhi Ubhale as Aarohi Akshay Mukadam
- Pratima Kulkarni as Parvati Mukadam
- Sulekha Talwalkar as Seema Shashikant Mukadam
- Janhavi Panshikar as Purna Mukadam
- Shashwati Pimplikar / Kajal Kate as Aarti Abhishek Mukadam
- Ashish Joshi as Abhishek Mukadam
- Vishwas Navare as Ramakant Mukadam
- Abhijeet Chavan as Shashikant Mukadam
- Rajashree Parulekar as Mayuri Shashikant Mukadam
- Smita Shewale / Meera Sarang as Janhavi Aanand Mukadam
- Vipul Salunkhe as Aanand Shashikant Mukadam
- Neha Nimgulkar as Aadya Ramakant Mukadam
- Aarush Bankhele as Parth Aanand Mukadam

Others

- Swara Korude as Kaveri Devsthali
- Poornima Ahire as Mangal
- Ashutosh Wadekar as Pankaj
- Pratik Nikam as Babloo
- Shweta Kamat as Manini Rajadhyaksha
- Suvedha Desai as Naina
- Aashay Kulkarni as Atharv
- Aditi Sarangdhar as Iravati
- Suruchi Adarkar as Swara
- Sharvani Pillai as Maai
- Siddharth Khirid as Saai
- Rohan Gujar as Neel
- Sai Ranade as Devika
- Sayee Aaditi Tushar as Tara
- Inesh Kotian as Parth

== Adaptations ==
Language	Title	Original release	Network(s)	Last aired	Notes
Hindi	Suhani Si Ek Ladki सुहानी सी एक लड़की	9 June 2014	StarPlus	21 May 2017	Original
Marathi	Muramba मुरांबा	14 February 2022	Star Pravah	28 June 2026	Remake
Hindi	Meetha Khatta Pyaar Hamara मीठा खट्टा प्यार हमारा	24 April 2024	StarPlus	10 July 2024	Remake
Tamil	Kanmani Anbudan கண்மணி அன்புடன்	16 September 2024	Star Vijay	Ongoing	Remake
