= Prachi Tehlan =

Indian actress and former netball player

- Tehlan at Mumbai Press Meet

Associate Vice President of Delhi Olympic Association
- Incumbent
- Assumed office 3 April 2026

Personal details
- Born: 2 October 1993 (age 33) New Delhi, India
- Height: 5 ft 11 in (1.80 m)
- Education: Jesus & Mary College; IMT Ghaziabad; MAIMS, GGSIPU
- Occupation: Actress; sports administrator; basketball player; netball player
- Website: www.prachitehlan.com
- Netball career
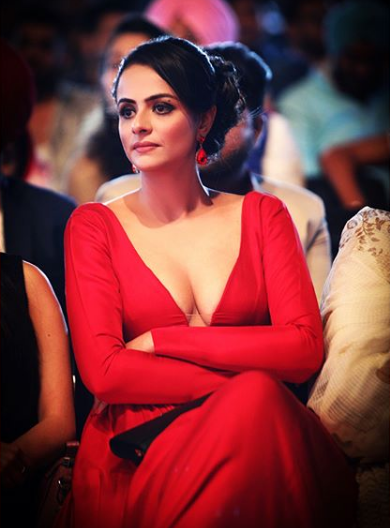
- Playing positions: GS, GA, WA
Years	Club team	Apps
2007–2011	Delhi	
Years	National team	Caps
2008–2011	India	24
Medal record
Netball
Representing India
South Asian Beach Games
Silver medal – second place	2011 Hambantota

Prachi Tehlan (born 2 October 1993) is an Indian actress, sports administrator and former netball and basketball player. Prachi is the former captain of the India national netball team which represented India in the 2010 Commonwealth Games and in other major Asian Championships in 2010–11. Under her captaincy, the Indian team won its first medal in 2011 South Asian Beach Games. She has been given the title of “Queen of The Court” by The Times of India & “Lass of The Rings” by The Indian Express. She is the brand ambassador of Netball Development Trust India for 2011–2017.

She made her acting debut in the TV series Diya Aur Baati Hum on Star Plus in January 2016. She made her film debut as Nimmy in the Punjabi film Arjan opposite Roshan Prince directed by Manduip Singh in 2017. She is active in Punjabi and Malayalam cinema.

== Early life and education ==
Tehlan did her schooling from Montfort Senior Secondary School, Delhi. She graduated in B.Com. (Hons.) from Jesus and Mary College, University of Delhi and completed her PG Diploma in Marketing Management from Institute of Management Technology, Ghaziabad. She had enrolled in Maharaja Agrasen Institute of Management Studies, GGSIP University, Delhi where she completed her Masters in Business Administration (HR and Marketing).

She has worked on various projects in Development Bank of Singapore, Deloitte, Accenture and 1800Sports.in. She is contributing to a project named UDAAN - Skills to Succeed for Mobilization, Training and Employment of youth from Jammu and Kashmir under National Skill Development Council, Delhi.

== Sports career ==
She started her sports career with basketball playing at the national level while still in school. She was selected to attend the Indian camp thrice in 2004, in Cuttack, Odisha.

=== Basketball ===
- 2002-2007
  - Played 2 sub-junior nationals (under-14), 2002–03
  - Represented Delhi 8 times in under-17 category
  - Represented Delhi 3 times in under-19 category

=== Netball ===
- Won a gold medal at 34th National Games
- Played Inter College thrice
- Represented Delhi at senior nationals
- Played Indo-Singapore series 2010
- Captain of the team at 7th Youth Asian Championship, 2010
- Participated and captained the national team in the 2010 Commonwealth Games
- Represented India and was captain of the senior team at 6th Nation Cup, Singapore
- Represented India and was captain at 2011 South Asian Beach Games. The team bagged a silver medal.

== Acting career ==
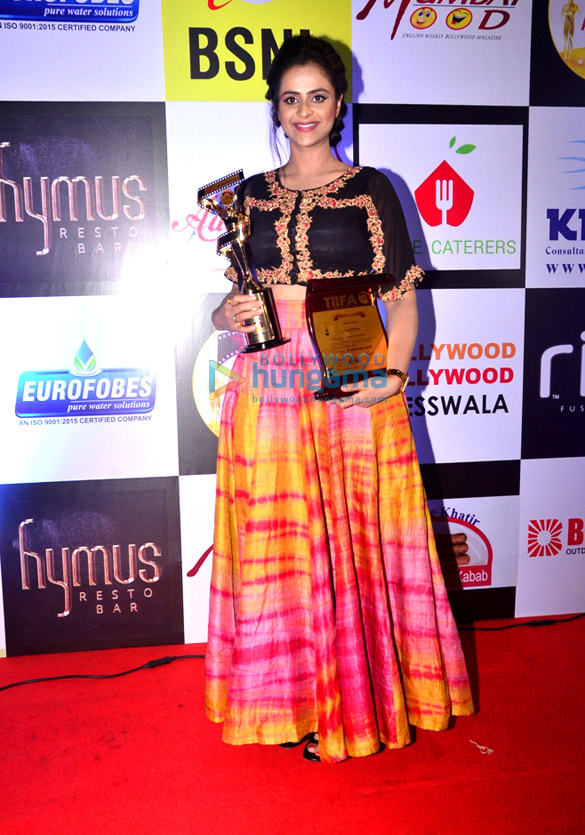
Prachi Tehlan at the TIIFA Award show function.

Prachi decided to accept an offer from Shashi Sumeet Productions and make her acting debut with side character role in the highly rated TV drama Diya Aur Baati Hum, on Star Plus channel in January 2016. She lost 15 kg (33 lbs) of weight to prepare for the role. Prachi stated her reasons to put her sporting career on hold due to the lack of opportunities and sponsors for female players of netball and basketball in India.

In 2017, she played a leading actress role in the Punjabi movie Bailaras . She was last seen in Malayalam movie Mamangam (2019) Tehlan was considered for one of the lead female roles in Ram opposite Mohanlal, but later decided to opt out due to lack of substantial role in the movie.

== Other work ==
In 2025, Prachi was roped in as the chief guest of the Super League Kerala club Malappuram FC at their club events and inaugurated the team and their jerseys for the 2025 season. The following year, she also inaugurated the team and their jerseys for the 2026 season.

On 3 April 2026, she was appointed the Associate Vice President of the Delhi Olympic Association.

== Filmography ==
=== Films ===
Year	Title	Role	Language	Notes
2017	Arjan	Nimmy	Punjabi	
2017	Bailaras	Sonali	Punjabi	
2019	Mamangam	Unnimaya	Malayalam	
2026	Trishanku	Nakshathra	Telugu	
TBA	Varaham	TBA	Malayalam	

=== Television ===
Year	Show	Role	Notes
2016	Diya Aur Baati Hum	Arzoo Rathi	Television debut
2017–2018	Ikyawann	Susheel Parekh	lead role
2019	Band Baja Bandh Darwaza		

=== Web series ===
Year	Title	Role	Network	Language	Ref.
2026	The Bads of Boardroom	Nandini	Kuku TV	Hindi	
2026	Tum Woh Nahi	Aarohi	Kuku TV	Hindi	

=== Music videos ===
Year	Title	Co-star	Singer(s)	Director	Movie	Language	Label	Ref.
2024	"Donkey Song"	Asif Ali	Anthony Daasan	Arfaz Ayub	Level Cross	Malayalam	Think Music India	
2025	"Thenela Vanala"	Nikhil Maliyakkal	Veeha	Charan Arjun	–	Telugu	Zee Music South	
2026	"Holariya"	Manoj Tiwari	Manoj Tiwari	Raunak Raut	–	Bhojpuri	Mridul Music	

== Recognition ==
- India won its first international medal under her captaincy in South Asian Beach Games, 2011 (Oct), Sri Lanka.
- Youngest Captain of any Netball in the Commonwealth Games 2010.
- Awarded as Sports Women of the Year 2010 by Jesus and Mary College and recognised as a Sports Achiever in Delhi University Achievers List.
- Short films made by Delhi Ajtak, Pragya T.V, Focus T.V, Living India by Ayur Group and NDTV. (2010, 2011)
- Subject of various articles published by leading newspapers, magazines and internet-
  - NDTV (2011) featured as one of the top 10 Hottest Sports Women in India.
  - India Today (2010) featured as one of the Top 10 Glamorous faces of Commonwealth Games-2010.
  - Sports Keeda (2010),
  - Cupid speaks(2010),
  - Hindustan Times (2010),
  - Times of India (2010), article “Queen of the Courts”.
  - Amar Ujala (2010,2011);
  - Indian Express (2005), article “Lass of the Rings”.
  - Chief Guest on various sports meets and social events(2010- 2012)
  - Chief Guest at IIM Kashipur sports meet (2016)
  - Guru Gobind Singh Indraprastha University Sports Meet (2010) with Sushil Kumar and Dhanraj Pillay
  - Terry For Marathon with Satpal Singh and Mohammad Azruddin (2010)
  - Guest at Limca Book of Records with Vijender Singh, Jwala Gutta, Gagan Narang, Mary Kom, Sushil Kumar, etc.(2011)
  - Chal Leh Bhag Leh Sports Event
  - Deepalaya School Sports Meet (2011)
  - Dev Samaj School Sports Meet (2012)
  - KAPSONS for its Brand Promotion, Kirti Nagar, 2012

== See also ==
- Sana Dua
