= Durga – Mata Ki Chhaya =

Indian television drama series

- Genre: Drama; Mythology
- Created by: Rashmi Sharma
- Developed by: Sahana
- Written by: Danish Javed; Vinod Sharma; Mrinal Jha; Bhavya Balantrapu
- Screenplay by: Sancheeta Bose; Rajesh Chawla
- Directed by: Bhagwan Yadav
- Creative directors: Mallika Sahay; Pavitra Kumar
- Starring: Chahat Pandey; Avinash Mishra; Rakshanda Khan
- Opening theme: Jai Maa
- Country of origin: India
- Original language: Hindi
- No. of seasons: 1
- No. of episodes: 65

Production
- Producers: Rashmi Sharma; Pawan Kumar
- Cinematography: Danny
- Editor: Monu Singh
- Camera setup: Multi-camera
- Running time: 22–25 minutes
- Production company: Rashmi Sharma Telefilms

Original release
- Network: Star Bharat
- Release: 14 December 2020 – 12 March 2021

Related
- Durga

Durga – Mata Ki Chhaya (transl. Durga – Goddess Durga's reflection) is an Indian television drama series that premiered on 14 December 2020 on Star Bharat. It starred Chahat Pandey, Avinash Mishra and Rakshanda Khan.

== Plot ==
The show opens with the religious ceremony of Saptami Puja at Aneja Villa in Gurdaspur for the Goddess Maa Durga. All family members are present for the Aarti except for Damini, who is still preparing. This angers Alok because Maa Durga's Puja is being delayed. When he questions Damini, she gets angry at him. She taunts him and says that since he cannot shout at her, he will have to vent his frustration on others. She tells him that everyone, even the Goddess herself, would wait until she comes down to start the Puja. On the other hand, everyone knows that Dev's health is poor, so Alok asks Kishore to call the Doctor. Damini says she had ordered Kishore not to call the Doctor, because no one is allowed to come into Dev's room except Kishore.

In the Kiratpur village, the villagers are seen worshiping the Goddess Durga at a temple and singing hymns to her. Advocate Batra arrives to see that instead of performing Avinash and Aarti's funeral ceremony, they had been performing a Puja. He reads Avinash's will to Amrish and Damini, stating that after his and Aarti's deaths, all their property belongs to Dev and if anything happens to Dev the property will be given to charity. He leaves, saying that after a month he will return to complete all formalities with Dev. Hearing this, both are shocked.

Alok lights a diya in remembrance of his dead brother Avinash. Damini disrespectfully blows it off, which fuels his regret for marrying Damini after she brainwashed him, as he still loves his first wife Sakshi. Damini and Amrish plan to make Dev mentally unstable so that both of them can attain the property.

Alok and Tara question Damini on why she stops them from entering Dev's room. She says that Dev is mentally ill and treating him with shock therapy is necessary. She tries to make Tara believe that she treats Samarth, Aayush and Dev as her elder brothers, but in reality, Samarth and Aayush are her step-brothers. Damini says that neither they nor her cousin brother Dev will do anything for her, and only God knows what will happen to her if she is no longer there.

At night, the last person to have met Dev had left the door open and so Dev unknowingly went out of the house, to everyone's consternation and worry. Damini and Amrish are angry about possibly losing the property, hence Damini begins to interrogate each family member, as she thinks one of them had purposely left the door open so that Dev could escape.

Elsewhere, Dev roams happily in a park. Durga is out with her father Shailendra and Sunny comes to Gurdaspur to perform Jagratas and pay the debt of her father. Amrish hires goons to find Dev, but they fail to catch him. Damini then calls the media and fakes concern for Dev. Meanwhile, Durga performs Jagrata at Gurdaspur and prays to the Goddess Durga to make her meet her life partner.

Damini stops Alok and Aayush from filing a missing complaint in Police Station for Dev. Dev is protected from danger for a while by the intervention of the Goddess Durga, but is later found by the hired goons and brought back home safely. Tara, Alok, Aayush, Kishore Ketki and Kabir are relieved. Meanwhile, Damini again tortures Dev as she notices Durga's paintings drawn by Dev. Dev tells Damini that the woman in the pictures opened the door for him to escape. On seeing Dev in pain Alok, Aayush, Kishore and Tara are terrified and in love of Dev, Kishore reveals that he left the door opened. Damini throws him out of the house although Alok, Tara, Aayush, Kabir and Ketki tried to stop her. Kishore is given some cash by Alok, and he leaves the house after asking to see Dev one last time.

Kishore returns to his hometown Kiratpur and meets Purohit ji. He sees Durga in the temple and narrates the story of Dev painting her face. On hearing this, Durga and Purohit ji are glad.

After many hurdles, Durga and Dev plan to get married, and everyone in the family is happy except Damini. Using her Yogamaya powers, Damini sends Durga 70 years back in time so that she can easily usurp the family's property. However, the divine Durga sends Lakhan, a doppelganger of Dev who lived 70 years earlier, to the present, replacing the real Dev who goes 70 years back in time so that he is safe from Damini and Geetu. While Durga teaches Dev to be strong and mentally fit, Lakhan takes Dev's identity and teaches Damini and Geetu a lesson for their harsh behavior towards the entire family. He orders Damini to touch his feet and apologize while holding her ears to Alok, and makes Geetu do so to Dev. Alok is hesitant and Damini is furious.

Lakhan tries to run away with the family jewelry and implores Durga to open a magical door. As he is about to go back in time, Damini stops him and reveals that she knows the truth about Lakhan. Damini says that Jogmaya had revealed everything to her. However, she is prevented from escaping with Lakhan. Jogmaya says to Damini that if she wants to defeat Durga to claim the Aneja family and Dev's property, she needs to put her back into a human form. Hearing this, Damini thinks that if she becomes the human form of Jogmaya she will get her powers back. She absorbs Jogmaya into her soul and stops Dev and Durga to reunite in 2021 as she sends Durga into Patallok and forces Lakhan to stay in 2021 and Dev, 70 years earlier in the past. Eventually, Durga escapes and reunites with Dev in the past. They find the way back to the future and try to go there. But Damini and Geetu stop them to finish them in the past itself. Durga gets divine help and vanquishes Geetu and later on kills Damini with a trident. The couple returns home having defeated their enemies and are happy. The story ends with the family reuniting, Dev healing and uniting with Durga everyone singing praises of the Goddess.

== Cast ==
=== Main ===
- Chahat Pandey as Durga Dev Aneja: Santosh and Shailendra's daughter, Dev's wife, Avinash and Aarti's daughter-in-law. She is an ardent devotee of the Goddess Durga and also sings very well in her Jagratas.
- Avinash Mishra as Dev Aneja: Aarti and Avinash's son; Alok and Sakshi's foster son, Durga's husband and Samarth, Aayush and Tara's cousin brother. He has a great talent for painting and is humble and happy go lucky, but mentally unstable due to the tortures of Damini and Amrish, he is the actual heir of Aneja Villa. He was adopted by Alok and Sakshi after the death of his parents.
- Rakshanda Khan as Damini Aneja: Alok's second wife; Dev's aunt; Samarth and Aayush's stepmother; Tara's mother. She is selfish, greedy and cunning. She will go to any extent to take Dev's property, as she believes nobody in the family is her own except her daughter Tara. She humiliates and dominates the Aneja family and uses them as her pawn to attain the whole property.

=== Recurring ===
- Sai Ballal as Amrish Aneja: Reeti's husband; Alok and Avinash's elder brother. He is covetous and authoritative. (2020–21)
- Mehul Buch as Alok Aneja: Sakshi's beloved husband; Damini's husband with his second marriage; Samarth, Tara and Aayush's father and Dev's foster father. He ihas been controlled by Amrish and Damini for the last 12 years and feels guilty for ousting Sakshi from the Aneja villa. (2020–21)
- Kajal Pisal as Ketki Aneja: Samarth's wife; Kabir's mother; Sakshi and Alok's elder daughter-in-law; Damini's step-daughter-in-law and Tara's step-sister-in-law. She is straightforward and independent and doesn't like Damini as her mother-in-law due to her domination in the house. (2020–21)
- Sailesh Gulabani as Samarth Aneja: Sakshi and Alok's caring elder son; Aayush elder brother; Damini's stepson; Ketki's husband; Kabir's father; and Tara's elder step brother. (2020–21)
- Aryavart Mishra as Kabir Aneja: Ketki and Samarth's son; Alok and Sakshi's grandson; Damini's step-grandson (2020–21)
- Simran Budharup as Tara Aneja: Damini and Alok's only daughter; Sakshi's step daughter, Samarth and Aayush's caring younger stepsister and Dev's loving younger cousin. (2020–21)
- Adi Irani as Advocate Batra, a family lawyer of Aneja's who thinks there is something fishy about Damini and Amrish. (2020–21)
- Vikram Mehra as Aayush Aneja: Sakshi and Alok's loving younger son; Samarth's younger brother; Damini's stepson; Neetu's husband (2020–21)
- Yashashree Chiplunkar as Neetu Aneja: Aayush's wife (2020–present)
- Shahab Khan as Kishore: Dev's caretaker who has grown and brought up by him. He cares and supports Dev at every step. He was killed by Damini while saving Dev {deceased character} (2020)
- Angshuma Saikiaa as Nimmo: Aneja family's house helper (2020–21)
- Kuldeep Dubey as Shailendra: Durga's father and Santosh's husband (2020–21)
- Palak Purswani as Geetu: Meetu's daughter and Dev's to-be fiancée hired by Damini and Jogmaya. (2021)
- Sanket Choukse as Sunny Sahini; Durga's friend in Gurdaspur (2020–21)
- Kamalika Guha Thakurta as Jogmaya; Damini's consultant and black magic performer (2021–21)
- Vidisha Srivastav as Devi Parvati (2021)
- Krishna Kant Singh Bundela as Sarpanch
- Ahmad Harhash as Ranveer Veghala (2020–2021)

== Production ==
=== Development ===
The series began production in mid-November 2020. The series is set in Punjab, India.

=== Release ===
The first promotional material for the series was released on 27 November 2020 featuring the leads Chahat Pandey, Avinash Mishra and Rakshanda Khan. the series was released on 14 December 2020.

=== Cancellation ===
Due to low TRP, the last episode aired on 12 March 2021 and was replaced by Mann Kee Awaaz Pratigya 2. The show ran for 65 episodes.

== Adaptations ==
Language	Title	Release date	Network(s)	Last aired	Notes
Bengali	Durga	8 September 2008	Star Jalsha	26 June 2010	Original
Kannada	Durga	7 December 2015	Star Suvarna	5 August 2017	Remake
Hindi	Durga – Mata Ki Chhaya	14 December 2020	Star Bharat	12 March 2021	Remake
