= Ab Hoga Hisaab =

- Genre: Crime thriller
- Written by: Radhika Anand; Sudeep Nigam; Namit Sharma
- Directed by: Divyanshu Malhotra
- Starring: Sanjay Kapoor; Avinash Mishra; Mouni Roy; Shaheer Sheikh; Nimrit Kaur Ahluwalia
- Country of origin: India
- Original language: Hindi
- No. of seasons: 2
- No. of episodes: 20

Production
- Producers: Niyati Merchant; B. Saikumar; Namit Sharma
- Cinematography: Swayam Kondlekar
- Running time: 30–50 minutes

Original release
- Network: Amazon MX Player
- Release: 18 June 2026 – present

Ab Hoga Hisaab is a 2026 Hindi-language crime thriller TV series directed by Divyanshu Malhotra, starring Sanjay Kapoor, Shaheer Sheikh, Avinash Mishra, Mouni Roy in lead roles.

== Cast ==
- Sanjay Kapoor as Goldy Sekhon
- Mouni Roy as Kamna
- Shaheer Sheikh as Bobby Manocha
- Avinash Mishra as Bunty Manocha
- Aasheema Vardaan as Lovely
- Kitu Gidwani as Rupinder Bajwa
- Nimrit Kaur Ahluwalia as Gazal
- Paramveer Singh Sekhon as Harpal
- Nikhil Nairr as Lakha
- Karan Chaudhary as Aman
- Harman Singha as Inspector Dosanjh
- Eklavey Kashyap as Rathi
- Subodh Gulati as Satbir
- Shabnam Vadhera as Surjeet
- Vandana Joshi as Sangeeta

== Release ==
The series premiered on 18 June 2026 at Amazon MX Player.

== Critical reception ==
Deepa Gahlot for Rediff.com reviewed the series and stated it is a "...revenge drama that attempts to weave a complex narrative of crime and retribution but often loses its way amidst a multitude of bizarre subplots." Prachi Arya of India Today felt the series "looks like a gripping crime-revenge drama." Santanu Das for Hindustan Times said "Ab Hoga Hisaab feels stretched beyond its limits."
