= Divjot Sabarwal =

Indian television actress

- Occupation: Actress
- Years active: 2010–2017
- Known for: Suhani Si Ek Ladki

Divjot Sabarwal is an Indian television actress known for portraying the character of Karantiya in Zee TV's soap opera Mrs. Kaushik Ki Paanch Bahuein and Bhavna in Star Plus's Suhani Si Ek Ladki. She also starred in Zee TV's Pavitra Rishta as Madhuri. She appeared in the films Chillar Party, A Thursday, and Jogi.

== Television ==
Year	Title	Character
2010–2011	Pavitra Rishta	Maadhuri Dharmesh Jaipurwala
2012–2013	Mrs. Kaushik Ki Paanch Bahuein	Karantiya Shivendu Kaushik
2014	Pyaar Ka Dard Hai	Nafisa Khan
2014–2017	Suhani Si Ek Ladki	Bhavna Sharad Mishra
