= Priyank Tatariya =

Indian model and actor (born 1981)

- Born: Priyank Tatariya; 29 July 1981 (age 44); Bhavnagar, Gujarat.
- Occupations: Model, actor
- Years active: 2009 - present
- Height: 5 ft 11 in (180 cm)

Priyank Tatariya (born 29 July 1981) is an Indian model and actor. He started his career as a model and appeared in commercials for Acer, Center Fresh and others. He wrote and directed the 2014 Indian Gujarati short film Ravla and acted in the 2015 short film End Topic. In 2017, he started appearing in the leadrole of Mehul Parekh in the Star Plus television series Ikyawann. He is of Gujarati descent.

== Filmography ==
Year	Name	Role	Platform	Notes
2015	End Game			
2017	Ikyawann	Mehul Parekh	Star Plus and Hotstar	
2019	Parchhayee		ZEE5	Episodic role
2019	Divya Drishti	Brij	Star Plus	
2021	Split Ends	Ali		
2022	Pishachini	Prateek Rajput	Colors TV	
2024	Janani – AI Ki Kahani	Yogesh Sharma	Dangal TV	
2025	The Trial (Indian TV series)	Mohan Jaykar	Disney+ Hotstar	
2025	Baramulla	Dr. Kamlanand Sapru	Netflix	
2025	Perfect Family (Indian TV series)	Sumit Mangtani	YouTube	
