= Suhani =

Suhani is an Indian feminine given name. The meaning of Suhani is Pleasant, Beloved or Cherished one. It is derived from the Sanskrit word "suhani," which translates to "dear" or "beloved.

Notable people with the name include:

- Suhani Dhanki
- Suhani Si Ek Ladki
- Suhani Shah
- Suhani Pittie
- Suhani Kalita
- Suhani Gandhi
- Suhani Thadani
- Suhani Jalota
