= Sahil Mehta (actor, born 1988) =

Indian television actor

- Born: 4 April 1988 (age 38); New Delhi, India
- Occupation: Actor
- Years active: 2011–present
- Spouse: Eesha Danait (m. 2016)

Sahil Mehta (born 4 April 1988) is an Indian television actor known for playing Yuvraj Birla in Suhani Si Ek Ladki and Sameer Singh in Shakti – Astitva Ke Ehsaas Ki.

== Career ==
Mehta had starred in the Bollywood movie Love Express, opposite Neha Yadav. In 2014, he made his TV debut when he was cast as the leading role of Yuvraj Birla in Suhani Si Ek Ladki opposite Rajshri Rani Jain on Star Plus. In 2018, he was cast as Sameer Singh on Shakti – Astitva Ke Ehsaas Ki on Colors TV.

== Personal life ==
Sahil Mehta married longtime girlfriend Eesha Danait in 2016.

== Filmography ==
=== Films ===
| Year | Title | Role | Notes |
|---|---|---|---|
| 2011 | Love Express | Kanav Chhadha | |
| 2022 | Goodbye | Angad Bhalla | |
| 2026 | Main Vaapas Aaunga | Adil | |

=== Television ===
| Year | Serial | Role | Notes |
|---|---|---|---|
| 2014–2017 | Suhani Si Ek Ladki | Yuvraj Birla | |
| 2018 | Shakti – Astitva Ke Ehsaas Ki | Sameer Singh | |
