= Goodbye (2022 film) =

2022 Indian film by Vikas Bahl

- Theatrical release poster
- Directed by: Vikas Bahl
- Written by: Vikas Bahl
- Produced by: Shobha Kapoor; Ekta Kapoor; Viraj Savant; Vikas Bahl
- Starring: Amitabh Bachchan; Rashmika Mandanna; Neena Gupta; Sunil Grover
- Cinematography: Sudhakar Reddy Yakkanti
- Edited by: A. Sreekar Prasad
- Music by: Amit Trivedi
- Production companies: Good Co.; Balaji Motion Pictures; Saraswati Entertainment Pvt Ltd
- Distributed by: Zee Studios
- Release date: 7 October 2022
- Running time: 142 minutes
- Country: India
- Language: Hindi
- Box office: est. ₹9.66 crore

Goodbye is a 2022 Indian Hindi-language family comedy-drama film written and directed by Vikas Bahl and produced by Bahl, Viraj Savant, Ekta Kapoor and Shobha Kapoor under their banners Good Co, Balaji Motion Pictures and Saraswati Entertainment Pvt Ltd. The film stars Amitabh Bachchan, Rashmika Mandanna (in her Hindi film debut) and Neena Gupta with, Sunil Grover, Pavail Gulati, Ashish Vidyarthi, Payal Thapa, Elli AvrRam, Sahil Mehta, Shivin Narang, Shayank Shukla, newcomer Abhishekh Khan and Arun Bali play supporting roles. This film featured Arun Bali's last performance, who died on the day of the film's release.

Goodbye was theatrically released on 7 October 2022. Despite receiving positive response from critics, the film failed at the box office and finalised, as a box office bomb.

== Plot ==
The story centres on a dysfunctional household. Lawyer Tara Bhalla (Rashmika Mandanna) is staying with her partner Mudassar in Mumbai. She leaves to party after winning her first case. Tara doesn't respond to calls or messages from her mother Gayatri. She finds out from the Bar Waiter that Gayatri has died, when her father Harish calls the same day. Her mother had called her to ask her about her first case.

To be with Harish (Amitabh Bachchan), she quickly travels to her birthplace of Chandigarh. She has three brothers, Karan, Harish's eldest son, who lives in Los Angeles; Nakul, his second son; and an adoptive son named Angad, living in Dubai. Additionally, Karan and his American wife Daisy as well as Angad book the first flight to Chandigarh. Meanwhile, Nakul is unavailable due to him being on mountain climbing on Mount Everest and his phone is unreachable, his father leaves a message for him to see later. The first person there is Tara. She and Harish disagree about the cremation rites, and they argue about them.

Harish is also furious with Karan and Angad since he thinks they don't seem affected by the death of their mother. Fights break out in the home because of Harish's behaviour. However, none of them have a choice. For a few days, they must live together under one roof.

The film explores the themes of family dynamics, forgiveness, and the healing power of acceptance. Through introspection and conversations family starts to find closure and begins the process of healing.

== Cast ==
- Amitabh Bachchan as Harish Bhalla: Gayatri's husband, Karan, Angad, Nakul and Tara's father, Delna's foster father and Daisy's father-in-law
- Rashmika Mandanna as Tara: Gayatri and Harish's only daughter, Karan, Nakul and Angad's only sister, Delna's foster sister and Daisy's sister-in-law
  - Riddhi Sharma as Young Tara
- Neena Gupta as Gayatri Bhalla: Harish's late wife, Karan, Angad, Nakul and Tara's mother and Daisy's mother-in-law
- Sunil Grover as Pandit ji: A modernistic pandit in Haridwar.
- Abhishekh Khan as Nakul Bhalla: Gayatri and Harish's youngest son
  - Shihaan Bakshi as Young Nakul
- Pavail Gulati as Karan Bhalla: Gayatri and Harish's eldest son, Daisy's husband and Nakul, Angad and Tara's elder brother and Delna's foster brother.
  - Mayank Padia as Young Karan
- Sahil Mehta as Angad Singh Bhalla: Gayatri and Harish's Sikh adoptive third son, Karan, Nakul and Tara's brother, Daisy's younger brother-in-law and Delna's love-interest.
  - Samarjit Singh Mahajan as young Angad
- Payal Thapa as Delna: Gayatri and Harish's foster daughter and Karan, Nakul and Tara's foster sister and Angad's love-interest.
- Shivin Narang as Mudassar, Tara's live-in boyfriend who is a DJ. Although Gayatri liked him but Harish disapproved of him as being a Muslim.
- Elli AvrRam as Daisy Bhalla: Karan's wife, Gayatri and Harish's daughter-in-law and Nakul, Angad and Tara's sister-in-law.
- Ashish Vidyarthi as PP Singh, Harish's neighbour and friend
- Sanjay Mishra as taxi driver
- Arun Bali as Gayatri's father
- Neelu Kohli as Geeta, Gayatri's sister
- Rajni Basumatary as Delna's mother
- Shayank Shukla as Chintan
- Teetu Verma as Tillu
- Chandrahas Pandey as Little Harish's father
- Paran Murmu as Paran

== Production ==
The film entered production on 2 April 2021 in Mumbai and the entire shoot was completed on 25 June 2022.

== Music ==
Goodbye

Soundtrack album by Amit Trivedi
- Released: 28 September 2022
- Genre: Feature film soundtrack
- Length: 34:37
- Language: Hindi
- Label: Zee Music Company

Amit Trivedi chronology
Chup: Revenge of the Artist (2022)	Goodbye (2022)	Doctor G (2022)

Official audio
- Goodbye - Full Album on YouTube

The music of the film is composed by Amit Trivedi. Lyrics are written by Swanand Kirkire, Vikas Bahl and Amit Trivedi.

Tracklist
No.	Title	Lyrics	Singer(s)	Length
1.	"Chann Pardesi"	Swanand Kirkire	Amit Trivedi	4:10
2.	"Jaikal Mahakal"	Swanand Kirkire	Amit Trivedi, Suhas Sawant	4:03
3.	"Maaye"	Swanand Kirkire	Devenderpal Singh, Deedar Kaur	4:34
4.	"Kanni Re Kanni"	Swanand Kirkire	Nakash Aziz	5:52
5.	"The Hic Song"	Vikas Bahl, Amit Trivedi	Sharvi Yadav, Rupali Moghe	3:31
6.	"Happy Birthday"	Swanand Kirkire	Abhijeet Shrivastava	2:59
7.	"Beautiful"	Swanand Kirkire	Amit Trivedi	2:51
8.	"Jaikal Mahakal" (Reprise)	Swanand Kirkire	Suhas Sawant	4:03
9.	"Maaye" (Reprise)	Swanand Kirkire	Devenderpal Singh, Shreya Ghoshal	4:34
Total length:				34:37

== Reception ==
Goodbye received positive reviews from critics. On the review aggregator website Rotten Tomatoes, 40% of 10 critics' reviews are positive, with an average rating of 4.8/10.

Navneet Vyasan of News 18 rated the film 4 out of 5 stars and wrote, "Vikas Bahl asks many questions in his latest film. It is hard to find loose ends in his film and even if it exists it proves to be inconsequential, unable to hamper the film's strong points." Rohit Bhatnagar of The Free Press Journal rated the film 4 out of 5 stars and wrote, "Goodbye won't leave you soon but rather fiddle around your mind and make you rethink your equations with your family. It is a perfect family entertainer of the modern-day world but with strong roots." Kartik Bhardwaj of Cinema Express rated the film 4 out of 5 stars and wrote, "The Amitabh Bachchan, Rashmika Mandanna starrer is an emotional ride with its heart in the right place." Ganesh Aaglave of Firstpost rated the film 3.5 out of 5 stars and wrote, "The emotional roller-coaster will make you smile, laugh and cry with every character making a special place in our hearts. The film deserves a special mention for the beautiful montages." Mayur Sanap of Rediff rated the film 3.5 out of 5 stars and wrote, "Goodbye is embedded with solid emotional moments, a few chuckles and some nice ponderings upon life, love and everything inbetween. With its heart in the right place, the film is perfectly efficient and likable in both jerking tears and soliciting laughs." Princia Hendriques of Mashable India rated the film 3.5 out of 5 stars and wrote, "In the era of power-packed, adrenaline-filled cinematic treats, Goodbye provides a breather for the audience to gather their family." Sanchita Jhunjhunwala of Zoom rated the film 3.5 out of 5 stars and wrote, "Goodbye is the kind of film that's all heart, and is a sob-fest but also has ample of moments that will make you laugh through the tears." Sonal Verma of Zee News rated the film 3.5 out of 5 stars and wrote, "Goodbye has proven that not everything is a myth and that not every myth is wrong. Vikas Bahl's family dramedy will take you on an emotional ride full of hurdles, tears and laughs all together." Grace Cyril of India Today rated the film 3.5 out of 5 stars and wrote, "Goodbye is filled with heartwarming and heartbreaking moments. The unfiltered emotions in the film touch the right chord and even bring you closer to your loved ones."

Renuka Vyavahare of The Times of India rated the film 3 out of 5 stars and wrote, "Goodbye is a story of a family coping with grief and laughing through their pain. Keep the tissues handy before watching this one." Tina Das of The Print rated the film 3 out of 5 stars and wrote, "Amitabh Bachchan steals the show, and is only challenged by the iridescent Neena Gupta in Goodbye." Bollywood Hungama rated the film 2.5 out of 5 stars and wrote, "Goodbye works due to the touching moments, relatability factor, and performances. However, the film suffers due to the bizarre developments, weak second half, and depressive tone." Shubhra Gupta of The Indian Express rated the film 2.5 out of 5 stars and wrote, "Amitabh Bachchan-Rashmika Mandana's film delivers broad humour and heavy-handed sentimentality, which succeeds best when the emotion occasionally swims to the top without the belabouring." Saibal Chatterjee of NDTV rated the film 2 out of 5 stars and wrote, "Goodbye is crafted to deliver an unabashed workout for the lachrymal glands. Its grievously shallow methods undermine its avowed purpose." Pratikshya Mishra of The Quint rated the film 2 out of 5 stars and wrote, "Goodbye is constantly asking you to feel something or the other till it comes to an end with a half-baked lesson on 'compromise'. A more concise script, fewer characters, and trust in the audience would've gone a long way for a film like Goodbye."

=== Box-office ===
The film grossed ₹9.66 crore worldwide in its run. It started with ₹0.93 crore at the domestic box office on its opening day. Its gross collection stands at ₹3.78 crore in first weekend.

As of 13 October 2022, the film grossed ₹6.68 crore (US$690,000) in India and ₹2.06 crore (US$210,000) overseas for a worldwide gross collection of ₹8.74 crore (US$910,000).
