= Chahat Pandey =

Indian actress

- Born: June 1, 1999 (age 27); Damoh, Madhya Pradesh, India
- Education: Maharishi Mahesh Yogi Vedic University (BA)
- Occupations: Actress; Model
- Years active: 2016–present
- Known for: Durga – Mata Ki Chhaya; Bigg Boss (Hindi TV series) season 18
- Political party: Aam Aadmi Party (2023 - present)

Chahat Mani Pandey is an Indian actress who has portrayed lead roles as Pakhi Parekh in Hamari Bahu Silk, Durga Aneja in Durga – Mata Ki Chhaya and Mahua/Krishna in Nath. In 2024, she participated in Bigg Boss 18.

== Personal life ==
Chahat Pandey was born and raised in Chandi Chopra village, Damoh, Madhya Pradesh. Her mother is Bhavna Pandey. She studied in Chandi Chopra to the 5th standard. Her father died when she was young. She completed the 10th standard from Adarsh School in Jabalpur Naka, and the 12th standard at JPB school, both in Damoh district. She also did acting training in Indore with Balaji Group. She moved to Mumbai to pursue her acting career.

== Career ==
=== Television ===
Pandey debuted in 2016 in the television soap opera Pavitra Bandhan, where she portrayed Mishti Roy Choudhary, the younger daughter of the main character Girish, who returns from having lived in America. She also had episodic roles in the crime dramatisation series Savdhaan India. In 2017, Pandey featured in the teaser trailer for the soap opera RadhaKrishn as the lead character Radha, but was later replaced by Mallika Singh.

Pandey played the lead role of Pakhi Parekh in the 2019 TV serial Hamari Bahu Silk, where she played the role of a voice artist who dubs for an actress who stars in a number of sensual films but has a hoarse voice in real life. In 2020, she and the other actors on the show complained that they had not received their payment dues, and that she was getting asked by her landlord to leave for not paying rent. There were also rumours that she had attempted to kill herself but she soon refuted, saying her mother's statement was misunderstood. The issue concerning her payment dues was eventually resolved in 2021.

In February 2020, while shooting an episode for Mere Sai - Shraddha Aur Saburi, Pandey was briefly injured and hospitalized when she stepped on a piece of glass while barefoot.

She portrayed the title character Durga Aneja, who is a god-gifted child born with boons from Goddess Durga, in the television series Durga – Mata Ki Chhaya opposite Avinash Mishra, which ran on Star Bharat from December 2020 to March 2021. From August 2021 to October 2024, Pandey starred as in Dangal TV's show Nath, as Mahua opposite Arjit Taneja, Mishra and Ankit Gera in its first season Nath: Zevar Ya Zanjeer and Mahua's daughter Krishna opposite Arjun Singh Dalal in its second season Nath: Krishna Aur Gauri Ki Kahani. From October 2024 to January 2025, she has been a contestant in Bigg Boss 18. Since February 2026, she participated in Colors TV's The 50.

=== Political ===
She joined Aam Aadmi Party before the 2023 Madhya Pradesh Legislative Assembly election. She was the candidate of AAP for the Damoh Assembly constituency of Madhya Pradesh Legislative Assembly and lost her deposit.

== Filmography ==
=== Television ===
Year	Title	Role	Notes	Ref.
2016	Pavitra Bandhan	Mishti Roy Choudhary		
2016	Savdhaan India	Various		
2017	Aisi Deewangi Dekhi Nahi Kahi	Preeti		
2017	Cheekh... Ek Khauffnaak Sach	Sapna Singh		
2017	Hoshiyar	Anjali		
2017	Crime Patrol Satark	Roohi		
2017	RadhaKrishn	Radha	Promo	
2018	Mahakali — Anth Hi Aarambh Hai	Devasena		
2018	Kaun Hai?	Ambika	Episode: "The Heir of Dhawalgarh (Part 2)"	
2018	Tenali Rama	Ananta Lakshmi		
2018	India Alert	Various		
2019	Aladdin – Naam Toh Suna Hoga	Princess Meher	Recurring role	
2019	Hamari Bahu Silk	Pakhi Parekh		
2019–2020	Laal Ishq	Jhanvi	Episode: "Ashwa Danav"	
2019–2020	Laal Ishq	Chandrika	Episode: "Chandra Pishach"	
2019–2020	Laal Ishq	Paneeri	Episode: "Kark Danav"	
2019–2020	Dwarkadheesh Bhagwan Shree Krishn – Sarvkala Sampann	Radha		
2020	Mere Sai - Shraddha Aur Saburi	Upasana	Recurring role	
2020–2021	Durga – Mata Ki Chhaya	Durga Aneja		
2021	Ishq Mein Kill Dil	Prarthana		
2021–2023	Nath	Mahua Rathore Mishra		
2023–2024	Nath	Krishna Mishra Narayan		
2024	Gehna: Zewar Ya Zanjeer	Krishna Mishra Narayan	Cameo appearance	
2024–2025	Bigg Boss 18	Contestant	8th place	
2026	The 50	Contestant		

=== Web series ===
Year	Title	Role	Notes	Ref.
2025	Saas Bahu Aur Swaad	Riya Rastogi		

== See also ==
- List of Hindi television actresses
- List of Indian television actresses
