= Mamangam (film) =

2019 Indian Malayalam-language epic historical action film

- Theatrical release poster
- Directed by: M. Padmakumar
- Screenplay by: Sajeev Pillai; Shankar Ramakrishnan
- Produced by: Venu Kunnappally
- Starring: Mammootty; Unni Mukundan; Anu Sithara; Siddique
- Cinematography: Manoj Pillai
- Edited by: Raja Mohammed
- Music by: Songs: M. Jayachandran; Score: Sanchit Balhara and Ankit Balhara
- Production company: Kavya Film Company
- Distributed by: Kavya Film Company
- Release date: 12 December 2019 (India)
- Running time: 160 minutes
- Country: India
- Language: Malayalam
- Budget: ₹55 crore

Mamangam (transl. Festival) is a 2019 Indian Malayalam-language epic historical action drama film directed by M. Padmakumar, and produced by Kavya Film Company. Sajeev Pillai was the director in the first schedule, but was replaced by M. Padmakumar. It stars Mammootty in the lead role, with Unni Mukundan, Achuthan and Siddique. The film is about the Mamankam festival of the 18th century on the banks of the Bharathappuzha at Tirunavaya, in the Malabar region. The film follows Chaaverukal who plots to overthrow the Samoothiri.

Songs are composed by M. Jayachandran. Originally shot in Malayalam, it was dubbed in Tamil, Telugu and Hindi and simultaneously released worldwide on 12 December 2019. The film became a box-office bomb.

== Synopsis ==
During the medieval fair of Mamangam, twelve-year-old warrior Chandroth Chanthunni becomes a legend after putting up a brave fight against the Zamorin.

== Plot ==
The film begins with a Mamangam festival (conducted every 12 years) which is conducted by the present Zamorin several years after the ownership of the festival was handed over forcefully from Valluvakkonathiri to the Zamorin. From that time onwards Valluvakkonathiri used to send his best Warriors from Valluvanad to confront the Zamorin and kill him. But the warriors would usually die by the hands of Zamorin's 30000 men even before they could reach the Nilapaduthara where the Zamorin used to sit. The eyes of such dead warriors are pulled out and their body is dropped into a well named Manikkinar with the help of elephants. During this Mamangam too, the Chaverukal led by Chandroth Valiya Panikkar has arrived to confront the Zamorin. They fight the Zamorin's army and everyone except Valiya Panikkar dies. But finally, Valiya Panikkar reaches the Nilapaduthara by his skills.

The story then shifts to 24 years later where 2 of the latest warriors in Chandroth Tharavaadu are preparing to leave to Mamangam festival or Mamangappattanam as Chaverukal after they had visions from Thirumanthankunnu Devi to do so. They are Chandroth Panikkar and a young boy of 12 years named Chanthunni. It is then revealed that Valiya Panikkar actually didn't kill the Zamorin or die during the festival, he escaped the place. So the people of his family consider him a traitor (As due to ancient customs, he had to kill or be killed there, not return without finishing the goal) and he hadn't returned ever since. So some people think that he died including Panikkar and Chanthunni.

As Zamorin's men are hunting down Chaverukal who are setting of to the festival, Panikkar and Chanthunni decides to leave secretly after completing all the customs they had to do in their Tharavaadu and saying a sorrowful goodbye to their relatives. They are guided to the festival by a lower caste man called Kungan and they leave. The story then shifts to the perception of Zamorin's right-hand man Thalachennor who has arrived at a brothel owned by the dancer and Unnimaya to investigate the death of a foreigner named Zamar Koya who is a very important man to the Zamorin. He used to go to the brothel regularly and got killed near the place. During the investigation Thalachennor receives different versions of stories on the death of Koya from Unnimaya, her lover Rarichan and her sister Unni Neeli. Due to his wisdom he understands that all these versions are fake. He then notices a painting in the brothel which shows all the areas of Mamangappattanam and understands that someone who had visited the festival had drawn this. During the following investigation it is understood that it was drawn by a transgender named Kuruppu, who is an artist, who helped these women to make such a brothel and who used to visit the brothel at times. An informer to the Zamorin is also found wounded in the woods.

Later, it is known from the informer that he saw Panikkar and Chanthunni in the woods and he reported it to Zamorin after finding out they were Chaverukal, who sent troopes to take them down. During subsequent fight the two are able to take down all the men with the help of Muslim merchant Pokkar and his men who had earlier promised to help the duo during their quest. But Pokkar dies during the fight and Panikkar is bitten by a snake. Suddenly the informer was wounded by an unknown warrior. Unimmaya recalls that a wounded man and a kid had earlier arrived at the place and was treated by Kuruppu who is a doctor too. Kuruppu seemed to know much about the Mamangam festival. Thalachennor forces Unnimaya to say more about the mysterious Kuruppu. Finally he learns that Kuruppu was none other than disguised Chandroth Valiya Panikkar. During flashbacks it is revealed that after escaping the festival, Valiya Panikkar couldn't return to his village as they would consider him a traitor and he wouldn't be welcomed there. So he was forced to disguise himself and live away from them for 24 years.

While Valiya Panikkar was staying at the brothel, he heard about the news of Chaverukal which had somehow leaked. So he left searching for them and found them fighting a bunch of soldiers and it was him who neutralised the gunman, wounded the informer and took wounded Panikkar and Chanthunni to the brothel. He treated him there and finally revealed to them that he was actually Valiya Panikkar. It is further revealed that as Valiya Panikkar reached the Nilapaduthara to kill the Zamorin, he was surprised to find the place empty. Earlier during the fight, Thalachennor had advised the Zamorin to leave the seat and hide in the Nilavara fearing Valiya Panikkar's skills, which he agreed to. After reaching the Nilapaduthara, Valiya Panikkar had only 2 choices, one was to die by the hands of the men simply and attain fame by his death or to escape the fest. Panikkar chose the latter after knowing that death was useless. After this incident he understands that being a Chaver was useless and the death of all these men for these many years was a waste as the Zamorin who took the procession by force had died centuries before. He tells all these to Panikkar and Chanthunni and is finally able to convince them that he is neither a traitor nor afraid. He tries to convince them not to go to the festival as it will only take their lives but fails to do so. So he promises to accompany them to the festival.

Zamar Koya who was at the place for all these time feels suspicious about the two as he is assigned to prevent Chaverukal from reaching the fest. Under Valiya Panikkar's command Panikkar and Chanthunni leaves the place midnight in between the dance performance. Seeing this Zamar Koya follows them but gets killed by Valiya Panikkar after a fight. Thalachennor decides not to follow them and returns to the festival with his men. Panikkar and Chanthunni who had left with Valiya Panikkar after the previous events reunites with Kungan who takes them to a secret shelter where Valiya Panikkar trains Chanthunni and tells them all about Mamangam and the place. After some days, they continue their journey. They move through many places and finally reach the Mamangam festival. Valiya Panikkar is forced to leave them on their own as it is their destiny. They disguise themselves and enter the Mamangappattanam. As they try to escape a checking gate by the soldiers, they meet Moyin who is the son of Pokkar. He had arrived there to help the duo after his father's death. The three of them confront the Zamorin, and a huge battle begins between the 3 and the 30000 soldiers. They are able to kill many soldiers, but in course Moyin and Panikkar are killed. Without fearing after seeing their death, Chanthunni continues his feat.

After remembering Valiya Panikkar's lessons he uses the light staffs (jumping from one to another) to reach the Nilapaduthara, but the soldiers pull down the last staff. But this doesn't prevent Chanthunni reaching the Nilapaduthara. He is able to wound the scared Zamorin. But as he tries to kill the Zamorin, he is stabbed to death by Thalachennor from the back, and his body falls down. In the aftermath, while searching for the body of Chanthunni, the soldiers realise that it is missing. Thalachennor finds out that it was the work of Valiya Panikkar who had earlier promised Chanthunni that he would bring his body back to the village in case he died. He hears the words from Kungan too. As no one has ever seen or retrieved the body of a dead chaver till then, he decides to prevent this. He along with his men chase Valiya Panikkar to a valley side where they confront each other. But they are no match for Valiya Panikkar. Valiya Panikkar kills these men and finally Thalachennor. He brings back the body of Chanthunni to his village. After seeing his body and hearing the advice of Valiya Panikkar, the villagers and the family members learn about their mistakes and decide that no more Chaverukal will be sent. As he cannot stay in a village who treated him as a traitor, he leaves the village never to be seen again, and a monument is erected for Chanthunni who is the only chaver whose body has been ever retrieved.

== Cast ==
- Mammootty as Chandroth Valiya Panicker / Kurup
- Unni Mukundan as Chandroth Panicker
- Achuthan B Nair as Chandroth Chanthunni
- Siddique as Thalachennor
- Prachi Tehlan as Unnimaya
- Anu Sithara as Manikyam, Chandroth Panicker's wife
- Suresh Krishna as Pokkar
- Manikuttan as Moyin, Pokkar's son
- Sudev Nair as Rarichan
- Kaniha as Chirudevi, Chanthunni's mother
- Iniya as Unni Neeli, Unnimaya's sister
- Tarun Arora as Zamar Koya
- Kaviyoor Ponnamma as Puthumana Thampuratti, Chandroth Valiya Panicker's mother
- Idavela Babu as Chandroth family member
- Mohan Sharma as Zamorin in first Mamangam
- Ajay Rathnam as Zamorin in later Mamangam
- Maala Parvathi as Chandroth Panicker's and Chirudevi's mother
- Meghanathan as Chandroth Pothuvaal
- Saiju Kurup as Kunjaliyan
- Manikandan Achari as Kungan
- G. Suresh Kumar as Mamangam announcer
- Romanch as Keloth Panicker
- Baiju Ezhupunna as Konthi Nair
- Jayan Cherthala as Mamangam visitor
- Sajitha Madathil as Karumari
- Sudheer Sukumaran as Thalachennor's henchmen
- Abu Salim as Zamorin's soldier
- Malavika Menon as Dancer (cameo)
- Nandan Unni as Mamangam visitor
- Shafique Rahman as Zamorin's soldier
- Thambi Ramaiah as Durai
- Dinesh Prabhakar as Archer Babu
- Valsala Menon as Chandroth family member
- Sharanya Anand as a woman in brothel
- Nilambur Ayisha as Chandroth family member
- Rithu Manthra

== Accolades ==
Year	Award	Category	Recipient	Result	Notes
2020	22nd Asianet Film Awards	Best Playback Singer (Female)	Bombay Jayashri	Won	
2020	22nd Asianet Film Awards	Youth Icon	Unni Mukundan	Won	along Mikhael

== Production ==
=== Development ===
Mamangam was originally planned by director Sajeev Pillai who has written the script, which is based on Mamankam festival that was celebrated during the 17th century. The film features Mammootty in the role of a warrior. The makers got permission from Navodaya to reuse the title of their 1979 film. According to sources from the production team, as of January 2019, the budget of the film was ₹45 crore. In November 2019, producer Venu Kunnapilly revealed the final budget to be ₹55 crore. The film is the 4th most expensive Malayalam film ever.

Neeraj Madhav and Dhruvan were hired for major roles. Later Dhruvan was replaced by Unni Mukundan who play Chandroth Paniker. Prachi Tehlan, Anu Sithara and Hindi film actress Pranchi Desai were hired for the female lead roles. Achuthan who is trained Kalaripayattu was cast as Chandroth Chanthunni Menon, a 15-year kid who is the youngest fighter in the history of Mamankam. Kaniha, Iniya, Siddique, Sudev Nair, Suresh Krishna and Manikkuttan were also hired for pivotal roles. Tarun Arora made his Malayalam cinema debut with the film. On 29 January 2019, it was confirmed that M. Padmakumar will replace Sajeev Pillai as the director. The producer announced that Padmakumar will be assisted by some of the renowned technicians in completing the movie. Cinematographer Manoj Pillai replaced cinematographer Ganesh.

The film showcases the martial art of Kalaripayattu and the actors have undergone training for Kalaripayattu and horse riding. The actors including Mammootty, Unni Mukundan and Manikuttan have undergone physical transformation for the film. Sham Kaushal is the action choreographer. Director Ram is supervising the dubbing of the Tamil version. The visual effects for the film is done by Kamalakannan.

=== Filming ===
Principal photography began in February 2018 at Mangalapuram and completed the first schedule in the same month. After M. Padmakumar was hired as the director in January 2019, the film shooting restarted from scratch. The sets are created in an 18-acres of plot in Maradu where the old era is recreated and was erected by close to thousand labourers and cost around 5 crores. The war sequence of the film were shot in 20 acre land in Nettoor, which was built by around 2000 workers and costing 10 crore was constructed with 10 tonnes of steel and 2000 cubic metre of wood. Big sets were erected.

As of 10 May 2019, the film completed 80 days of the planned 120-day shoot. The climax sequence was shot in over 40 days. During the final days of production in Nettoor, there were scenes that had nearly 3000 artistes, dozens of elephants and horses. The film was completed in 4-5 schedules in different locations and on different sets.

== Soundtrack ==
Mamangam

Soundtrack album by M. Jayachandran
- Released: 19 October 2019
- Recorded: 2019
- Studios: Muzik Lounge, Chennai; Aravind Audio Garage, Mumbai; K7 Studios, Kochi
- Genre: Feature film soundtrack
- Languages: Malayalam; Hindi; Tamil; Telugu
- Labels: Lahari Music; T-Series
- Producer: M. Jayachandran

M. Jayachandran chronology
Pattabhiraman (2018)	Mamangam (2019)

The soundtrack was composed by M. Jayachandran, while the film score is composed by Sanchit Balhara and Ankit Balhara. Lahari Music released the soundtrack in Malayalam, Tamil and Telugu, while the Hindi version was done by T-Series. The audio launch event for the film was held on 19 October 2019 at Kochi. The lyrics for the Malayalam version were written by Rafeeq Ahmed and Ajay Gopal. The Hindi, Tamil and Telugu versions were by Manoj Yadav, Palani Bharathi and Bhuvanachandra respectively. The album features three tracks in both the versions.

=== Track listing ===
Malayalam
No.	Title	Lyrics	Singer(s)	Length
1.	"Mukkuthi"	Rafeeq Ahamed	Shreya Ghoshal	4:10
2.	"Thaaraattu"	Ajay Gopal	Bombay Jayashri	3:41
3.	"Mamangam Theme"	Rafeeq Ahamed	Unni Elayaraja, Yazin Nizar	3:00
4.	"Peelithirumudi"	Rafeeq Ahamed	K. J. Yesudas	2:00
5.	"Khanasangam"	Rafeeq Ahamed	Vidyadharan Master, Sangeethaa-Sangeetha Sajith	2:00

All lyrics are written by Manoj Yadav.

Hindi
No.	Title	Singer(s)	Length
1.	"Boondon Si"	Shashaa Tirupati	4:06
2.	"Lori"	Bombay Jayashri	3:42
3.	"Mamangam Theme"	Unni Elayaraja, Yazin Nizar	3:00

All lyrics are written by Palani Bharathi.

Tamil
No.	Title	Singer(s)	Length
1.	"Mukkuthi"	Mridula Warrier	4:15
2.	"Thaalaattu"	Bombay Jayashri	3:41
3.	"Mamangam Theme"	Unni Elayaraja, Deepak Blue	3:00

All lyrics are written by Bhuvanachandra.

Telugu
No.	Title	Singer(s)	Length
1.	"Mukkhera"	Mridula Warrier	4:11
2.	"Laali Paata"	Bombay Jayashri	3:40
3.	"Mamangam Theme"	Unni Elayaraja, Deepak Blue	3:00

== Release ==
The film was initially scheduled to release worldwide on 21 November 2019 but was postponed to 12 December 2019. The film was released along with dubbed versions in Hindi, Tamil and Telugu.

== Reception ==
=== Critical reception ===
Times of India gave 3 out of 5 stars and wrote that music and background score are good, "however, the drama does feel like a lost opportunity, considering the talent that was on offer, the stories they could have mined and fictional elements they could have inculcated,". India Today said the film "tries to tell the fictionalised story of chaverukal (suicide squad). While it manages to achieve it to an extent, the film is not a wholesome experience" and "the stunt sequences are hard to believe" and the "VFX is tacky". Manorama Online rated 3.5 stars out of 5, called it "an epic tale of feud and bloodshed", and appreciated the cinematography but said the stunts could have been better choreographed. Sify gave 3 stars out of 5 and wrote that "Mamangam may not be trying to impress with too much heroism but is a genuine and emotional tale from the past that is engaging."

The Indian Express rated 2.5 stars out of 5 and wrote, "A movie that could have narrated an intriguing story of suicidal warriors from Malabar region during the 18th century has turned out to be a collage of old school Malayalam stunt scenes, and cringe-inducing situations and dialogues which make you feel like you are watching a Malayalam serial ... the movie fails to live up to viewers' expectations as it is let down by the amateurish approach to the screenplay and direction". Firstpost wrote "Thematic relevance, courage and sensitivity are not enough to hold up an entire film though when the writing is shallow and the storytelling style [is] dull. These twin problem areas combined with action scenes and visual effects that are a mixed bag end up pulling down Mamangam".

HuffPost wrote "The making is distinctly old school, with stagey production, wordy dialogues and tediously framed action scenes ... While there are moments that hold our interest (the narrative is familiar), one wishes the characters were more well-written. Mammootty's character—Chandroth Valiya Panicker— is the most underwhelming period hero ever", also criticised the "bad writing", inorganic stunts and amateur VFX. Rating 1.5 out of 5, The News Minute called it a dull and "tedious underwhelming film", writing that "Mamangam gives the distinct feel of watching a mega serial. The stunts don't look realistic at all, with the warriors flying in the air as if they were playing a quidditch match on invisible broomsticks" and "Mammootty has a faintly regretful expression on his face, as if he's realised that he's walked into yet another bad film". Deccan Herald said it has good script, but bad acting and direction, stating "Mamangam is so bad that it looks like a satire on the period drama genre ... The film brings out the worst in Mammootty. It is as if the director picked out his worst facets and strung them together into a sequence".

=== Box office ===
The film collected ₹23 crore on its first day and ₹60 crore in its first weekend.

In the overseas opening weekend, it grossed US$44,352 (₹31.49 lakh) in the United States, A$37,827 (₹18.41 lakh) in Australia, £16,417 (₹15.56 lakh) in the United Kingdom, and US$5,854 (₹4.16 lakh) in Canada. It grossed US$57,648 (₹41.55 lakh) in the US in four weeks, US$789,218 in the United Arab Emirates in three weeks, and A$50,184 (₹24.7 lakh) in Australia in two weeks.
