= Titli (2023 TV series) =

Indian thriller drama television series

- Genre: Romance drama Psychological thriller
- Developed by: Aarooshee Sood
- Starring: See below
- Country of origin: India
- Original language: Hindi
- No. of seasons: 1
- No. of episodes: 144

Production
- Producer: Ved Raj
- Camera setup: Multi-camera
- Running time: 22 minutes
- Production company: Story Square Productions

Original release
- Network: StarPlus
- Release: 6 June – 27 October 2023

Titli (transl. Butterfly) is an Indian Hindi-language romantic drama television series produced by Story Square Productions. It aired from 6 June 2023 to 27 October 2023 on StarPlus and streams digitally on Disney+ Hotstar. It starred Neha Solanki and Avinash Mishra in lead roles.

== Overview ==
Titli is a story aiming to highlight the pivotal issues of domestic violence, abusive behaviour, mental health issues and anger management issues through the love story of a young florist Titli and an advocate Garv Mehta.

== Plot ==
The show starts with Titli growing up as a lively girl despite losing her parents as a child. She is then raised by her paternal uncle and aunt. She attends her friend's wedding where she meets her school friend Rahul. Later, Rahul comes with a marriage proposal at her house and Titli accepts him. However, on the wedding day, Titli finds out that he is already married and is only marrying her for a child. She denies marrying him and runs away to a cliff to cry out to God, where she meets Garv for the first time.

The next day, Garv hires Titli as a decorator for his sister Monika's wedding. Titli finds out about Garv's father having two wives, but the first wife who is closer to Garv is mistreated. During the course of the wedding, Garv begins to catch feelings for her and eventually falls for her by the end of wedding. He then confesses to her. Due to past trauma, she rejects him and Garv devotes himself to God to impress Titli.

Titli's second suitor humiliates Titli and Garv in front of their families. Garv confesses his feelings in front of their family and after much hustle, both families accept them and they get married. Titli's cousin sister Hiral who is envious of Titli, gifts Titli a bracelet with Rahul's name, which Garv sees on the wedding night and gets upset with Titli who was herself was unaware of this.

While visiting her family Titli confronts her sister which her uncle misunderstands and a fight between her uncle and Garv breaks out. Garv gets angry with her humiliating him during muh dikhayi and punishes her. Later Garv invites Titli's family to a surprise dinner planned by her. Titli in a drunk state gets saved by Monika's brother in-law, which Garv misunderstands and pushes Titli to the ground. She confronts him later which upsets him and Garv gets into an accident. Titli's sister complains about Garv to the police, who is the brother of Garv's ex whose hand Garv broke in anger.

After Garv recovers, they go on their honeymoon, but things become strained when Garv slaps Titli after she and others laugh at him after failing in a couple's competition. Garv hires goons to threaten Titli's family to impress Titli, but when she refuses to forgive him, he threatens to get into a car crash; she unwillingly forgives him. Later Hiral lies to everyone about Titli reporting Garv and she challenges to prove herself right in three days. After Titli proves herself innocent she tells him about wanting to go back to her flower shop. Garv, feeling guilty about how he treated Titli, agrees to it, but later creates problems for her. He eventually burns the shop and destroys any evidence. Garv also fakes having an allergy reaction to the flowers, and the entire family turn against Titli due to it.

On Garv's birthday, Garv hurts Titli again after seeing a picture of his dead brother, Cheeku. Garv's abuse gets exposed in front of his cousin, Dhara, on Janmashtmi.

A psychologist named Megha who is obsessed with Garv gets Titli's attention, and after much drama she gets Garv ready for treatment with his anger issues. Garv's anger issues gets revealed in front of his father, who creates a havoc in the family. Dhara reveals that Garv has abused Titli in anger, so Garv's adoptive mother slaps him. After getting slapped, Garv loses his calm and insults Titli.

Badi maa advises Titli to leave the house for self-respect and not stay with a toxic man. However, she returns later for Badi maa's respect and makes it clear that she will never forgive Garv. Garv promises to change himself. Despite Megha creating many problems, Garv doesn't lose his calm. Later a mentally challenged guy runs away from the hospital and enters the Mehta's house. Garv's father reveals him to be Chiku but tells Titli to not tell Garv, which she originally refuses to do. Garv finds out eventually and loses his calm and starts vandalizing his house. Later, Garv and Megha get engaged to each other and test Titli's love for Garv.

In the end, Garv refuses to do the 7 nuptial circumbalances with Megha and reconciles with Titli. And they start their marital life anew.

== Cast ==
=== Main ===
- Neha Solanki as Titli Dave: Garv's wife; Manikant and Maina's daughter in law; Paresh and Jayashree's niece; Hiral and Chintu's cousin. (2023)
  - Ravya Sadwani as Child Titli (2023)
- Avinash Mishra as Garv Mehta: Titli's husband; Manikant and Maina's son; Koel's foster son and nephew; Cheeku and Monika's younger brother; Drishti's elder brother; Hiren and Alpa's nephew; Dhara's cousin (2023)

=== Recurring ===
- Vatsal Sheth as Rahul: Titli's ex-fiancé. (2023)
- Rinku Dhawan as Koel Manikant Mehta: Manikant's first wife; Maina's elder sister; Cheeku, Monika, Garv, Drishti and Dhara's aunt. (2023)
- Yash Tonk as Manikant Mehta: Koel and Maina's husband; Monika, Cheeku, Garv and Drishti's father; Titli's father-in-law; Hiren's elder brother; Alpa's brother-in-law; Dhara's uncle. (2023)
- Vivana Singh as Maina Manikant Mehta: Manikant's second wife; Monika, Cheeku, Garv and Drishti's mother; Dhara's aunt (2023)
- Khushi Rajpoot as Ketki Dave: Titli's adoptive mother; Jayashree, Hiral and Chintu's mother. (2023)
- Ajay Dhansu as Titli's father. (2023)
- Sachin Parikh as Paresh Dave: Jayashree's husband; Hiral's and Chintu's father; Titli's paternal uncle. (2023)
- Nishi Singh as Hiral Dave: Paresh and Jayashree's daughter; Chintu's elder sister; Titli's cousin. (2023)
- Susheel Parashar as Manikant and Hiren's father; Garv, Monika, Cheeku, Dhara and Drishti's paternal grandfather. (2023)
- Devish Ahuja as Chintu Dave: Paresh and Jayashree's son; Hiral's brother; Titli's cousin. (2023)
- Radhika Chhabra as Monika Mehta: Manikant and Maina's elder daughter; Cheeku's younger sister; Garv and Drishti's elder sister; Aditya's wife (2023)
- Pratiksha Rai as Drishti Mehta: Manikant and Maina's daughter; Cheeku, Garv and Monika's younger sister; Dhara's cousin. (2023)
- Manu Malik as Hiren Mehta: Manikant's younger brother; Alpa's husband; Dhara's father; Cheeku, Monika, Garv and Drishti's paternal uncle. (2023)
- Parigala Asgaonkar as Alpa Hiren Mehta: Hiren's wife; Dhara's mother; Cheeku, Monika, Garv and Drishti's paternal aunt. (2023)
- Aditi Chopra as Dhara Mehta: Monika, Garv, Cheeku and Drishti's cousin; Hiren and Alpa's daughter. (2023)
- Ishaan Singh Manhas as Atharv "Cheeku" Mehta: Manikant and Maina's elder son; Garv, Monika and Drishti's brother; Dhara's cousin. (2023)
- Megha Prasad as Megha Verma: Garv's therapist and obsessive lover; Titli's college friend. (2023)
- Preeti Gandwani as Uma Dave: Titli's mother (Dead) (2023)

== Production ==
=== Development ===
In May 2023, the series was announced by Story Square Productions, highlighting the issue of domestic violence.

=== Casting ===
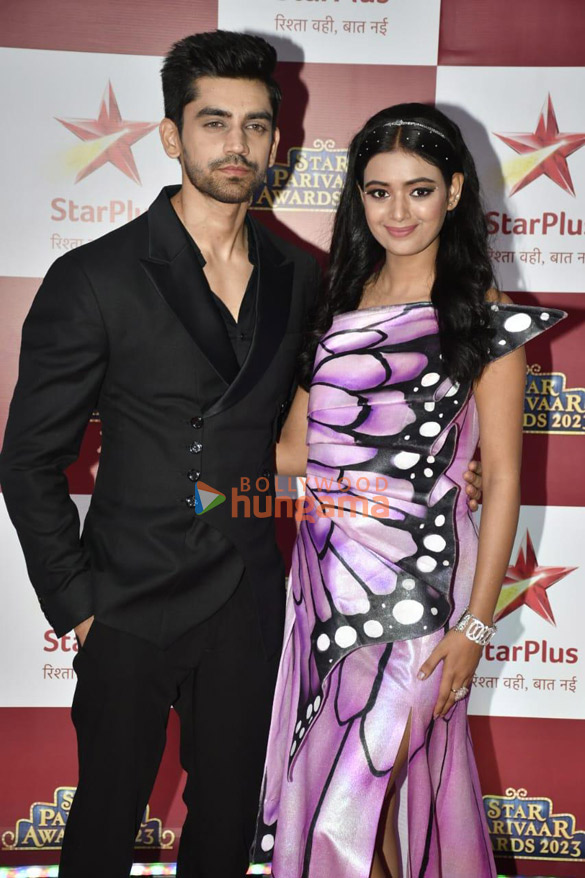
Mishra and Solanki at Star Parivaar Awards 2023

Neha Solanki as Titli and Avinash Mishra as Garv were signed as the leads. Vatsal Sheth was confirmed for playing a cameo in the show. This marks the second collaboration between Mishra and Solanki after Sethji.

=== Filming ===
The principal photography commenced at the Film City, Mumbai, with some initial sequences shot in Ahmedabad. Solanki also went on to make special appearances in Imlie and Anupamaa to promote the show.

== See also ==
- List of programmes broadcast by StarPlus
