= Kanmani Anbudan =

2024 Indian Tamil TV series

- Genre: Romantic drama
- Based on: Suhani Si Ek Ladki
- Screenplay by: Vetri (dialogues); Nandhan Sreedharan
- Directed by: V. Sathasivam
- Starring: Navin Vetri; Madhumitha; Gracy Thangavel
- Theme music composer: P. Sri
- Country of origin: India
- Original language: Tamil
- No. of episodes: 542

Production
- Producer: Daniel Xavier
- Cinematography: Kesavan
- Editor: P. Arunkumar
- Camera setup: Multi-camera
- Running time: 22-25 minutes
- Production company: D Studio

Original release
- Network: Star Vijay
- Release: 16 September 2024 – present

Related
- Suhani Si Ek Ladki

Kanmani Anbudan (transl. Kanmani with love) is a 2024 Indian Tamil language romantic drama television series that airs on 16 September 2024 and digitally streams on JioHotstar. The series is about the friends relationship between characters Kanmani and Vennila.

This show is Produced by Daniel Xavier under the banner of D Studio and directed by V. Sathasivam. Starring Navin Vetri, Gracy Thangavel and Madhumitha in the lead roles. The main plot of the series was taken from StarPlus's TV series Suhani Si Ek Ladki.

== Plot ==
This is a story of two best friends from two different backgrounds Kanmani (Madhumitha) and Vennila (Gracy Thangavel). Kanmani is from a middle-class family and she is best friends with a beautiful and rich girl Venilla. Kanmani falls for Anbu (Navin Vetri), who loves Vennila. But Vennila mistakenly thinks Anbu is in love with Kanmani. How that friendship is tested by their love interests over Anbu.

== Cast ==
=== Main ===
- Navin Vetri as Anbu
- Madhumitha as Kanmani
- Gracy Thangavel as Vennila

=== Recurring ===
- Meera Krishna as Sivagami
- Shanthi Williams / J.Lalitha as Rajeshwari
- Sanjay Kumar Asrani as Rajasekar
- Kadhal Kannan as Senthil
- Girish Ayyappan
- Karthik Sasidharan as Karthik
- Muthulakshmi Vaidyanathan
- Remya Joseph as Mayuri
- P. Malar as Swetha
- Raghul Kanagaraj
- Prasidhya Vijay as Maya
- Rithik as Iniyan
- Sripriya as Pavitra
- Siddharth Kapilavayi as Siddarth
- T. K. Kala as Vaidegi
- KPY Dhanasekar as Varadan
- Eshan Shyam as Jeeva

== Production ==
=== Development ===
The show was produced by D Studio and directed by V. Sathasivam, who is known for his series Kasthuri and Roja. In July 2024, Star Vijay announced the Tamil official remake of the show Hindi-language Suhani Si Ek Ladki.

=== Casting ===
Madhumitha and Gracy Thangavel was cast in the female lead roles as Kanmani and Vennila. This making Madhumitha and Gracy Thangavel first lead role in Tamil television. Navin Vetri was cast in the male lead role as Anbu after his role as Karthikeyan in Thamizhum Saraswathiyum serial. Meera Krishna, Shanthi Williams and Sanjay Asrani was selected to play Sivagami, Rajeshwari and Rajkumar.

In August 2025 Actress Sripriya was cast as Supporting role.

=== Release ===
The first promo was released on 15 August 2024, featuring Madhumitha and Dushita happily soaking in the rain. The show started airing on Star Vijay on 16 September 2024 from Monday to Saturday at 14:00 (IST), replacing Chellamma serial time slot.

== Adaptations ==
Language	Title	Original release	Network(s)	Last aired	Notes
Hindi	Suhani Si Ek Ladki सुहानी सी एक लड़की	9 June 2014	StarPlus	21 May 2017	Original
Marathi	Muramba मुरांबा	14 February 2022	Star Pravah	28 June 2026	Remake
Hindi	Meetha Khatta Pyaar Hamara मीठा खट्टा प्यार हमारा	24 April 2024	StarPlus	10 July 2024	Remake
Tamil	Kanmani Anbudan கண்மணி அன்புடன்	16 September 2024	Star Vijay	Ongoing	Remake
