= Meetha Khatta Pyaar Hamara =

- Genre: Romantic drama
- Created by: Suzana Ghai
- Based on: Suhani Si Ek Ladki
- Written by: Manaswini Lata Ravindra; Shilpa Rathi
- Directed by: Vighnesh Govind Kamble
- Starring: Prerna Singh; Avinash Mishra; Aarti Sachdeva
- Country of origin: India
- Original language: Hindi
- No. of episodes: 78

Production
- Producers: Suzana Ghai; Hemant Ruprell; Ranjeet Thakur
- Production location: Mumbai
- Camera setup: Multi-camera
- Running time: 22 minutes
- Production company: Panorama Entertainment Pvt. Ltd

Original release
- Network: StarPlus
- Release: 24 April – 10 July 2024

Related
- Muramba

Meetha Khatta Pyaar Hamara (transl. Our Sweet and Sour Love) is an Indian Hindi-language drama television series that aired from 24 April 2024 to 10 July 2024 on StarPlus and streams digitally on JioHotstar. It is produced by Panorama Entertainment Pvt. Ltd. It starred Prerna Singh, Avinash Mishra and Aarchi Sachdeva.

== Plot ==
Set against the backdrop of Pune, Sajeeri, a simple girl works hard to make a mark in the world of cooking. Sajeeri is a best friend to a rich girl Sanchi. They both are opposite from each other. Shivam, a renowned chef, belongs from a joint family of the wealthy Mukadams, falls for Sanchi and wishes to marry her. Shivam proposes Sanchi but she rejects him. Sanchi makes Sajeeri believe that Shivam loves her. One night Shivam proposes Sajeeri in an unconscious state which make her believe this. Nalini (Shivam's mother) and Sajeeri's mother are best friends. Nalini asks Sajeeri's hand for Shivam. Shivam and Sajeeri gets married. Shivam dislikes Sajeeri. Urmila (Shivam's grandmother) hates Sajeeri and calls her Basti Wali. She with Mandira (Shivam's sister-in-law) conspires against Sajeeri many times but she fails. Finally Urmila brings Sanchi abandoned by her boyfriend Nikhil, Sanchi decides to snatch Shivam from Sajeeri. Shivam who realised his feelings for Sajeeri fakes a drama where he tried to kill himself and Sanchi but Sanchi saved herself only while Sajeeri saves Shivam. Shivam tells Sanchi to be loyal in friendship. Sanchi leaves and Sajeeri Shivam reunites. Urmila accepts Sajeeri and the whole family reunites ever after.

== Cast ==
=== Main ===
- Prerna Singh as Sajeeri Devsthali Mukadam: Supriya and Mandar's daughter; Saachi's best friend; Shivam's wife
- Avinash Mishra as Shivam Mukadam: A chef; Nalini and Vikram's son; Adarsh and Anjali's brother; Sharad's cousin; Sajeeri's husband
- Aarchi Sachdeva as Saachi Khanna: Sajeeri's best friend; Shivam's love interest

=== Recurring ===
- Anuradha Rajyadhyaksh as Urmila Kulkarni Mukadam: Vikram's mother; Adarsh, Anjali, Sharad and Shivam's grandmother
- Aanchal Daljeet as Supriya Devsthali: Mandar's wife; Nalini's best friend; Sajeeri's mother
- Kanchan Prakaash
- Ashish Ratnaparkhi as Mandeep Singh
- Ilishaa Powar
- Yogendra Kumeria
- Nikhil Narang as Sharad Mukadam: Vikram's brother's son; Shivam, Adarsh and Anjali's cousin; Priya's husband
- Kimmy Kaur as Preeti Khanna: Sanchi's mother
- Vishal Malhotra
- Gauri Kadu as Nalini Joshi Mukadam: Vikram's wife; Adarsh, Anjali and Shivam's mother
- Shubham Sethi
- Savita Malpekar as Leela

== Adaptations ==
Language	Title	Original release	Network(s)	Last aired	Notes
Hindi	Suhani Si Ek Ladki सुहानी सी एक लड़की	9 June 2014	StarPlus	21 May 2017	Original
Marathi	Muramba मुरांबा	14 February 2022	Star Pravah	28 June 2026	Remake
Hindi	Meetha Khatta Pyaar Hamara मीठा खट्टा प्यार हमारा	24 April 2024	StarPlus	10 July 2024	Remake
Tamil	Kanmani Anbudan கண்மணி அன்புடன்	16 September 2024	Star Vijay	Ongoing	Remake
