= Nath – Zewar Ya Zanjeer =

Indian drama television series

- Genre: Drama; Romance
- Showrunner: Aarooshee Sood
- Screenplay by: Parishruta Sood
- Story by: Mamta Singh
- Directed by: Atif Khan
- Starring: Chahat Pandey; Arjit Taneja; Avinash Mishra; Ankit Gera; Aalisha Panwar; Arjun Singh Dalal; Kajal Chauhan; Piyush Sahdev
- Theme music composer: Isha Gaur; Punit Dixit
- Opening theme: "Nath – Gehna Hai Ya Hai Bedi" "Nath – Krishna Aur Gauri Ki Kahani" "Nath – Rishton Ki Agnipariksha"
- Country of origin: India
- Original language: Hindi
- No. of seasons: 3
- No. of episodes: 1072

Production
- Producers: Ved Raj; Isha Gaur
- Editors: Pankaj Kathpal; Ayan Hashmi
- Camera setup: Multi-camera
- Running time: 20–22 minutes
- Production company: Story Square Productions

Original release
- Network: Dangal
- Release: 23 August 2021 – 12 October 2024

Related
- Prem Bandhan; Gehna – Zewar Ya Zanjeer

Nath (transl. Nose Ring) is an Indian romantic drama television series. It premiered on 23 August 2021 and ended on 12 October 2024, after a three-year run and was aired on Dangal under the banner of Story Square Productions. One of the longest running Indian television soap operas, it starred Chahat Pandey, Arjit Taneja, Avinash Mishra, Ankit Gera, Aalisha Panwar, Arjun Singh Dalal, Kajal Chauhan and Piyush Sahdev. It completed 1000 episodes on 29 July 2024.

It was launched with the title Nath – Zewar Ya Zanjeer on 23 August 2021. On 10 May 2023, after the first-generation leap, it was renamed Nath – Krishna aur Gauri Ki Kahani. On 10 September 2024, after the second-generation leap, it was renamed Nath – Rishton Ki Agnipariksha, but the show went off air within one month after the leap. A spin-off titled Gehna – Zewar Ya Zanjeer aired from 22 July 2024 to 21 June 2025.

== Plot ==
Mahua, a bright girl in a village, meets Shambhu Singh Thakur, the elder grandson of a wealthy women, Durga aka Ammaji. They dislike each other. At the age of 18, Mahua's parents sell her to Ramesh by using a system called "Nath Utrayi", as he tries to kill her. She is saved by Shambhu, who marries her. After their marriage, Shambhu died in the hands of Ramesh and Mahua's elder sister, Boondi, who is his ex-fiancé who desired him as she had married to Radhe, Shambhu's cousin, as she had taken revenge against on her and Mahua marries Inspector Aryan Mishra, her best friend, while she also kills Boondi whom she tries to harm Aryan and she also destroys her evil spirit as she tries to harm her and also the family. Mahua, becomes pregnant and giving birth to two daughters, steals one from her father, Garjan Mishra. She steals the child from a woman selling it, and Aryan and Mahua separate, each taking one daughter.

Mahua, is a schoolteacher in the village, raises her daughter Krishna, while Aryan is in love with Kajal while raising his daughter Gauri. Aryan decided to divorce Mahua to marry Kajal and live happily. Mahua refuses to sign the divorce papers, and Ammaji announces Aryan and Kajal's wedding in front of the villagers. While Mahua's aunt, Poonam fixes her marriage with Kishor. Aryan and Mahua reunited, but Aryan is killed by Ramesh. Mahua mistakenly goes to Pakistan, but with the help of Shoaib, she escapes and returns to India. After that she marries Captain Aditya Rathore. Padma is murdered, and Ramesh is arrested. Mahua helps Janaki, but Sukant Narayan tortures her. Mahua exposes Sukant's crimes, but he kills her by throwing her off a building under construction.

Durga, Krishna, and Gauri live in poverty due to Mrs. Narayan's theft of the Thakur family's ancestral house. Gauri falls in love with Jeet Narayan, but Krishna married Jeet. Gauri fails to win back Jeet. She marries Sukant Narayan, Jeet's paternal uncle, to take revenge. Sukant is sent to a mental asylum. Krishna discovers Sukant inherited the ancestral house from Mrs. Narayan. Gauri betrays Krishna, claiming she is Sukant's wife and orders her to leave. Jeet eventually falls in love with Krishna and realizes Gauri's evil, but shortly afterwards Krishna is shot, falls off a cliff, and is presumed dead. Gopal suffers a heart attack during her wedding, at the same time as Krishna's attack. Gopala loses her memory and is left with Krishna's emotions, falling in love with Jeet and following him to the Narayan residence, convinced that he is her husband. Jeet initially rejects her, still in mourning for Krishna, but after escaping from Gauri's traps with the help of Gopala, he decides to accept Gopala's love and take her as his wife. But Krishna is alive, is held captive by Ajju, Gopala's fiancé, who plots against the Narayans. Gopala is after Jeet's money and wants to kill him. Later, Krishna manages to regain consciousness, just in time to prevent Gopala and Jeet's remarriage. With the help of a remorseful Gauri, Krishna sends Gopala to prison and decides to resume her marriage with Jeet. Krishna becomes pregnant with Jeet's child.

However, Gauri again becomes evil and tries to make Krishna believe that she suffered a miscarriage, while she herself becomes pregnant with Jeet and Krishna's child via IVF and feigns being attacked by Krishna. She then gives birth to a son via surrogacy and convinces everyone that Krishna killed it and is arrested, but on the way the police car explodes and Krishna is presumed dead.

Jeet married Gauri in order to raise his and Krishna's son Shiv whom he assumed of Gauri, but he never forgot Krishna. Meanwhile, Krishna fakes her own death after feeling betrayed by Jeet and his family, she becomes a police officer and raises her and Jeet's daughter, Gopika. The Narayan family is unaware of Gopika. But Krishna and Jeet meet again, as Shiv and Gopika meet and become friends, forcing Krishna have to face her past again. This approach leaves Gauri scared and obsessive, as she now fears losing not only her position as Jeet's wife, but also her son, since Shiv is in reality not her biological son but his adopted one, and possibly the son of Krishna herself. She creates countless situations to prevent Jeet from meeting Krishna, seeing Gopika with bad eyes and feeling guilty for leaving Shiv aside. Eventually, Gopika's paternity is revealed and Jeet decides to separate from Gauri and try to reconcile with Krishna. Finally, Gauri accepts that she has lost Jeet and tries to fake a good relationship with Krishna to keep Shiv with her.

== Cast ==
=== Main ===
- Chahat Pandey as
  - Inspector Mahua Aditya Rathore/Mahua Aryan Mishra/Mahua Shambhu Singh Thakur: Dharma and Chanda's daughter; Boondi and Bablu's sister; Shambhu and Aryan's widow; Aditya's wife; Krishna and Gauri's mother (2021–2023)
  - Inspector Krishna Mishra Narayan (formerly Pratap Singh): Mahua and Aryan's daughter; Gauri's twin; Jeet's first wife; Rudra's ex-wife; Shiv and Gopika's mother (2023–2024)
    - Aditi Mishra as child Krishna Mishra (2022–2023)
  - Fake Mahua (2022)
- Arjit Taneja as Shambhu Singh Thakur: Avtar's illegitimate son; Janki's stepson; Adhiraj's twin; Mahua's first husband (2021–2022)
- Avinash Mishra as
  - Inspector Aryan Mishra (2022–2023)
  - Viren Mishra: (2022)
- Ankit Gera as Captain Aditya Rathore (2023)
- Aalisha Panwar as Gauri Mishra (2023–2024)
  - Puvika Gupta as child Gauri Mishra (2022–2023)
- Arjun Singh Dalal as
  - Jeet Narayan (2023–2024)
  - Shaurya Jeet's lookalike; (2024)
- Kajal Chauhan as Gopika Narayan Pratap Singh (2024)
  - Jigruksha Chaudhary as Child Gopika (2024)
- Piyush Sahdev as Arya Pratap Singh: Ranveer’s brother (2024)
- Ahmad Harhash as Ranveer Pratap Singh Arya’s brother (2024)

=== Recurring ===
- Pratima Kazmi as Durga Singh Thakur aka Ammaji — The Thakur family's matriarch; Avtar, Ramesh and Sheela's mother (2021–2024)
- Sanjana Phadke as Sarasvali Narayan (2023–2024)
- Paaras Madaan as Shiv Narayan (2024)
  - Shaurya Sankhla as Child Shiv (2024)
- Rupal Patel as Kailashi Devi Pratap Singh: Arya's paternal aunt (2024)
- Shabaaz Abdullah Badi as Lalit Pratap Singh (2024)
- Neetha Shetty as Mantra Lalit Pratap Singh (2024)
- Jatin Bhatia as Sumeet Pratap Singh (2024)
- Neha Yadav as Tantra Sumeet Pratap Singh (2024)
- Neha Narang as Santra (2024)
- Pratibha Goregaonkar as Mrs. Pratap Singh (2024)
- Ravi Gosain as Avtar Singh Thakur (2021–2022)
- Pyumori Mehta Ghosh as Janki Singh Thakur: (Dead)
- Anurag Sharma as Ramesh Singh Thakur (2021–2023)
- Anjana Singh as Padma Singh Thakur (2021–2023)
- Achal Tankwal as Radhe Singh Thakur (2021–2023)
- Anjana Nathan as Sheela Singh Thakur (2021–2022)
- Shivani Gosain as Tejo Singh (2021–2022)
- Karan Khanna as Adhiraj Singh Thakur (2021–2022)
- Vaibhavi Kapoor as Boondi (2021–2022)
- Shahbaz Khan as Garjan Mishra: (2022)
- Roma Navani as Premlata "Prema" (2022)
- Vijay Badlani as Pramod Mishra (2022)
- Geetika Shyam as Sulekha Pramod's wife
- Hridayansh Shekhawat as Sajjan Singh (2022)
- Unknown as Dharma (2021)
- Shraddha Singh as Chanda (2021–2022)
- Ankur Dwivedi as Bablu (2021)
- Akanksha Gilani as Poonam (2021–2022)
- Vandana Vithlani as
  - District Magistrate (DM) (2021)
  - Mrs. Narayan (2023–2024)
- Vicky Ahuja as Raghavendra Narayan (2023—2024)
- Ajay Chaudhary as Sukant Narayan (2023–2024)
- Nitin Babu as Abhimanyu Narayan (2023—2024)
- Rashmi Gupta as Tara (2022)
- Ekta Methai as Supriya
- Urvashi Pardeshi as Jhelum (2022)
- Urmila Sharma as Sheetal Devi (2022)
- Pratiksha Rai as Kajal (2023)
- Ankita Khare as Garima (2023)
- Munendra Singh Kushwaha as Inspector Suraj Singh (2023)
- Abhishek Tewari (2022)
- Shravani Goswami as Sabina: (2022)
- Urvashi Upadhyay as Haseena Begam (2022)
- Bhawna Hada as Zara (2022)
- Nishat Ruby as Saba (2022)
- Diksha Nisha as Riya (2022)
- Ishita Ganguly as Gopala Pratap Singh: (2023—2024)
- Reyaansh Vir Chadha as Rudra Pratap Singh: (2024)
- Anupama Solanki as Kalavati (2023)
- Aditi Asija as Janki: (2023)
- Nandini Maurya as Chikki
- Fareed as Hariya: Chikki's father
- Riya Bhattacharjee as Kajri
- Shubha Saxena as social worker
- Krishnakant Singh Bundela as Panditji
- Sanjeev Khanna as DSP
- Md Rafi Khan as doctor who treated Tejo
- Ayesha Vindhara as Rani
- Manoj Chandila as Rudra (2023)
- Pallavi Mukherjee as Chanchal: Rudra's younger sister
- Rahulram Manchanda as Kishore (2022)
- Khushboo Sawan as Phoolia: servant in the Mishra household
- Radhika Chhabra as Reena
- Aloknath Pathak as Panditji
- Amit Sinha as Monica Kinnar
- Abhinav Gautam as Factory owner
- Ahmad Kabir Shadan as Senior Police Inspector (2022)
- Aman Maheshwari: (2023–2024)
- Nyshita Bajaj as Radha (2024)
- Samaksh Sudi
- Siraj Mustafa Khan as Sarpanch (2024)

=== Cameo appearances ===
- Shruti Anand as Ruchita Nihar Goel from Mann Sundar (2022)

== Production ==
=== Release ===
The series was announced on Dangal by Story Square Productions. Chahat Pandey and Arjit Taneja were signed as the lead. The show was released on 23 August 2021.

=== Casting ===
Taneja quit the show in February 2022 as he was not happy with the growth of his character in the show and his role did not shape up the way he imagined.

In March 2022 Avinash Mishra as Aryan is cast as the lead. In February 2023, Avinash Mishra also quit the series, saying "My character had no scope left. My track had reached a saturation point. I felt there was nothing more that I could give to the show. My character had no growth and so I thought that it was best to move on."
