= Hamari Bahu Silk =

2019 Indian television Serial

- Created by: Devyani Rale; Sudhanshu Tripathi
- Written by: Vishal/ Renu; Sudhir Singh; Pranjal Saxena; Manasvi Sharma
- Directed by: Sumit sodani
- Creative director: Nandita V. Kothari
- Starring: See below
- Opening theme: "Hamari bahu....silk"
- Country of origin: India
- Original language: Hindi
- No. of seasons: 1
- No. of episodes: 115

Production
- Producers: Devyani Rale; Sudhanshu Tripathi; Jyoti Gupta
- Cinematography: Indranil Singha
- Editor: Swapnil Nerulkar
- Camera setup: Multi-camera
- Running time: 30 minutes
- Production company: Klay Picture

Original release
- Network: Zee TV
- Release: 3 June – 8 November 2019

Hamari Bahu Silk is a Hindi-language Indian soap opera which premiered on Zee TV on 3 June 2019 to 8 November 2019. It starred Chahat Pandey, Zaan Khan and Reeva Choudhary.

== Plot ==
It is an interesting story of a young, street-smart girl, Paakhi, who does what it takes to get her way. She uses her silky voice quality to entice her cheating uncle who had duped her dead dad. He has also taken over their house, making her mom slog like a slave. Cut to the other lead, we have B-Grade actress, Natasha. However her biggest drawback is her husky voice which puts paid to her efforts to get launched by big film producer, Kapadia. The latter clearly tells Natasha's manager, Akash, that he can sign her only if they get a sexy voice to dub for her. Accordingly, they hold an RJ competition where a desperate for a job Paakhi also turns up. Here too, she pulls a fast one to get ahead in the long line of wannabe contestants (reverses her token number from 221 to 122).

As Akash and Natasha insult her regarding the racy audition lines, she puts up a perfect act, but then walks out. Natasha and Akash love her voice but she is nowhere to be found. The real 121 had a bad voice. As fate is to have it, Paakhi finds a job as personal assistant with Natasha, who entrusts her with the job of finding the missing voice. Pakhi is adamant on not helping Natasha out, but needs her salary, so plays along. The male lead is budding photographer, Naksh, who is being forced by his eccentric granny, Baa, to give up his passion and take over the family catering business. Natasha's car crashes into Naksh's set of wheels, and Pakhi uses that to curry favour with the actress. Paakhi keeps bumping into Naksh, who she again uses (calls him her husband to get a car for Natasha). To make matters worse, she and her mother become tenants in his house by impressing Baa. Natasha pulls every trick in the book to force Kapadia's hand, even hires women to smear ink on her in an attempt to get publicity.

Paakhi unknowingly scuttles the plan, but then helps get more media mileage, courtesy a well-orchestrated drama at the press conference, which the fourth estate very easily swallows. Unable to wait any longer, Kapadia chooses another talent. Upon hearing this, a very enraged Natasha drops in at his office and manhandles the new gal. The assault video goes viral and an angry Kapadia reads Akash the riot act. By then, the penny has dropped on Akash about the token change, but even here Paakhi moves a step ahead, dropping ink on the register, so her name is not legible. In the meantime, Paakhi who was fooling Naksh, helps him win a competition. Akash finally finds out the truth about Paakhi. Akash tells Natasha that Paakhi is the girl who have that voice that Natasha wanted. Paakhi refused to dub for Natasha. After that Natasha blackmails Paakhi by showing an edited video made by Natasha in which Baa pours poison in orphan children's food. Then Paakhi dubs for Natasha. After that Naksh and Paakhi fall in love with each other. But Baa arranges Naksh's marriage with Rimjhim, Mousami's sister. But Naksh doesn't like her. Then Natasha tells the truth of Paakhi to Naksh that Paakhi dubs for her. Finally Naksh knows the truth. The twist ends up Paakhi marrying Naksh. However, Naksh hates Paakhi due to her truth (which Natasha had twisted and told him). Soon, Mousami faces an accident, conducted by Rimjhim and slips into coma. However, soon she wakes up, but is unable to speak for while. Baa's health detriotes and she goes to an ashram.

On Navratri, Rimjhim plans to kill Paakhi and succeeds. Fearing that Mousami's recovery will expose her, Rimjhim tries to kill her but is stopped by Paakhi, who turns out to be alive and gets Rimjhim arrested. But Rimjhim escapes and tries to create problems for Paakhi and Naksh, but fails and is sent to jail. After this Paakhi and Naksh are united.

== Cast ==
=== Main ===
- Chahat Pandey as Paakhi Naksh Parekh (née' Joshi): Janaki's daughter; Naksh's wife(2019)
- Reeva Chaudhary as Natasha Mitra: a B-grade film actress; Akash's boss; Main antagonist (2019)
- Zaan Khan as Naksh Parekh: Mamta's son; Aruna's grandson; Paakhi's husband; Rimjhim's ex-fiancée (2019)
- Urvi Singh as Rimjhim Mehta: Mousami's sister; Naksh's ex-fiancée; Antagonist (2019)
- Shorya Sehgal as Naati Pinky: Natasha's friend(2019)
- Imran Nazir Khan as Director: Film Director (2019)

=== Recurring ===
- Manas Shah as Aakash, Natasha's manager (2019)
- Imran Nazir Khan as Rahul (2019)
- Rajesh Kumar as Kapadia, the film producer (2019)
- Sarita Joshi as Aruna Parekh a.k.a. "Baa", Naksh's grandmother (2019)
- Kirti Choudhary as Mausami, Naksh's bhabhi, Rimjhim's elder sister (2019)
- Zeeshan Khan as Naksh's best friend (2019)
- Mamta Verma as Mamta Parekh, Naksh's mother, Aruna's daughter in law. (2019)
- Vandana Vithlani as Janki (2019)
- Sonal Paresh as Ladylady (2019)
