= Avinash Mishra =

Indian actor (born 1995)

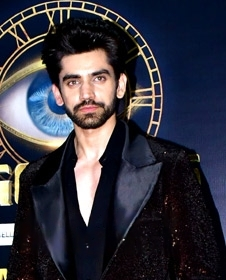
- Mishra in 2025
- Born: 9 December 1995 (age 30); Raipur, Madhya Pradesh (present-day Chhattisgarh), India
- Occupations: Actor; Disc jockey
- Years active: 2017–present
- Known for: Yeh Teri Galiyan; Nath – Zewar Ya Zanjeer; Bigg Boss 18; Khatron Ke Khiladi 15
- Height: 1.75 m (5 ft 9 in)

Avinash Mishra (born 9 December 1995) is an Indian actor and Disc jockey who works in Hindi television. He made his acting debut with Sethji, playing Bajirao. Mishra is known for starring in Yeh Teri Galiyan and Nath – Zewar Ya Zanjeer and his participation in Bigg Boss 18. In 2026, Mishra emerged as the winner of Khatron Ke Khiladi 15.

== Early and personal life ==
Mishra was born on 9 December 1995 in Raipur, Chhattisgarh to Ravi and Sangeeta Mishra into a Bihari family.

== Career ==
Mishra began his career by appearing in advertisements.

He made his television debut in 2017 with Sethji, where he played Bajirao. That same year, he appeared in Pyaar Tune Kya Kiya opposite Jiya Shankar, portrayed Abhay Singh Oberoi in Ishqbaaaz, and starred in Love on the Run as Sid.

In 2018, he was seen in Sony TV's Zindagi Ke Crossroads in the role of Sugreev and as Zain Ashraf in Mariam Khan – Reporting Live. From 2018 to 2020, he starred as Shantanu Mazumdar in Zee TV's Yeh Teri Galiyan opposite Vrushika Mehta.

In 2020, he played Kunal Rajvansh in Star Plus's Yeh Rishtey Hain Pyaar Ke opposite Kaveri Priyam. From 2020 to 2021, he appeared as Dev Aneja in Star Bharat's Durga – Mata Ki Chhaya opposite Chahat Pandey.

From 2022 to 2023, he played Inspector Aryan Mishra opposite Pandey once again in Dangal TV's Nath: Zevar Ya Zanjeer. In 2023, he played Garv Mehta in StarPlus' Titli.

In 2024, he portrayed Shivam in StarPlus' Meetha Khatta Pyaar Hamara. Later that same year, he participated in Colors TV's reality show Bigg Boss 18.

In June 2026, he marks OTT debut with MX Player's Ab Hoga Hisaab where he playing Bunty Manocha.

== Filmography ==
=== Television ===
Year	Title	Role	Notes	Ref.
2017	Sethji	Bajirao "Baji"		
2017	Pyaar Tune Kya Kiya	Kabir	Season 9; Episode 41	
2017	Love On The Run – A Haunting Past	Sid	Episode 3	
2017	Ishqbaaaz	Abhay Singh Oberoi		
2018	Mariam Khan – Reporting Live	Zain Ashraf		
2018	Zindagi Ke Crossroads – Emotion Or Practicality	Sugreev		
2018–2020	Yeh Teri Galiyan	Shantanu "Shaan" Mazumdar		
2020	Yeh Rishtey Hain Pyaar Ke	Kunal Rajvansh		
2020–2021	Durga – Mata Ki Chhaya	Dev Aneja		
2021	Durga – Mata Ki Chhaya	Lakhan Thakur		
2022	Nath – Zewar Ya Zanjeer	Viren Mishra		
2022–2023	Nath – Zewar Ya Zanjeer	Inspector Aryan Mishra		
2023	Titli	Garv Mehta		
2024	Meetha Khatta Pyaar Hamara	Shivam Mukadam		
2024–2025	Bigg Boss 18	Contestant	4th place	
2026	Khatron Ke Khiladi 15	Contestant	Winner	

=== Web series ===
Year	Title	Role	Notes	Ref.
2025	Pyar Sey Bandhe Rishte	Reyansh		
2026	Ab Hoga Hisaab	Bunty Manocha		

Other appearances

Year	Title	Roles	Ref
2026	Laughter Chefs - Unlimited Entertainment Season 2	Himself	
2026	Bhojpuri Bawaal	Host	
2026	Alliance	Himself	

=== Music videos ===
Year	Title	Singer	Ref.
2022	"Mean"	Ramya	
2022	"Barsaat"	Danish Alfaaz	
2024	"O Mere Humnava"	Sonu Nigam, Teesha Nigam	
2024	"Tere Siva"	Saaj Bhatt	
2025	"Kala Sha Kala"	Ramji Gulati	
2025	"Aao Na"	Adnan Sami, Asha Bhosle	
2025	"Jaadu Hai"	Ramji Gulati	
2025	''Barsaat Ho Rahi''	Rohit Dubey	
2026	"Shukriya"	Hansika Pareek, Vibhor Parashar	
2026	"Heeriye"	Krish & Kishore Mondal	

== Awards and nominations ==
Year	Award	Category	Work	Result	Ref.
2025	Indian Television Academy Award	Fan Fiction Jodi (Non-Fiction) (With Eisha Singh)	Bigg Boss 18	Nominated	
