= Sethji (TV series) =

Indian drama television series

- Intertitle
- Genre: Indian soap opera; Romance
- Created by: Divye Ratna Dixit
- Screenplay by: Roopa Desai
- Creative directors: Priyamvada Kant, Nameeta Sharma
- Starring: See below
- Country of origin: India
- Original language: Hindi
- No. of seasons: 1
- No. of episodes: 120

Production
- Producer: Divye Ratna Dixit
- Camera setup: Multi-camera
- Running time: 22 minutes
- Production company: Offshore Productions

Original release
- Network: ZEE TV
- Release: 17 April – 29 September 2017

Sethji is an Indian drama television series produced by Offshore Productions. The show premiered on ZEE TV.

it replaced Kaala Teeka and was replaced by Jeet Gayi Toh Piya Morey in its original time slot. Shortly after the time slot change, it went off the air.

== Plot ==
The show is based on the life of a young boy, Bajirao who belongs to a village in Maharashtra, ruled by Sethji, a strong-headed traditional lady. However, when he falls in love with modern Pragati, it creates ripples across the village.

== Cast ==
- Gurdeep Kohli as Sethji/Ahilya Devi
- Avinash Mishra as Baji/Bajirao
- Rumman Ahmed as Pragati
- Nadeem Khan as Sethji/Vinayak Rao
- Prachi Kowli as Devi
- Savi Thakur as Raghoji
- Divya Bhatnagar
- Amol Bawdekar
- Worshipp Khanna as Ganesh Rao
- Riya Chand
- Danish Bhatt
- Anurag
- Ayush Gautam
- Neha Solanki
- Aprajita Singh
