= Rajshri Rani =

Indian actress

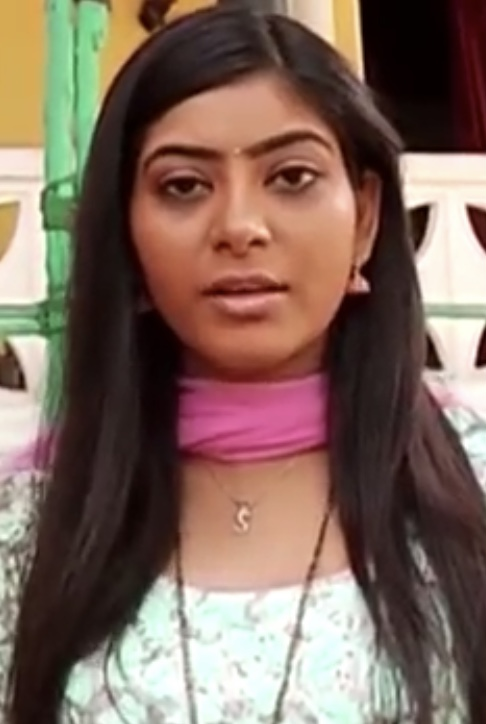
- Rani in 2015 on the sets of her show Suhani Si Ek Ladki
- Born: Fatehpur, Uttar Pradesh
- Other names: Suhani, Rajshri Rani Pandey (formerly), Rajshri Rani Jain
- Occupation: Actress
- Years active: 2012-present
- Known for: Suhani Si Ek Ladki Imlie
- Spouses: Vineet Pandey (m. 2008; div. 2018); Gaurav Mukesh Jain (m. 2020)

Rajshri Rani Jain (née Shukla) is an Indian TV actress known for her titular portrayal of Suhani in Star Plus show Suhani Si Ek Ladki.

== Career ==
Rani made her acting debut in 2012 by starring in Drashti Dhami's show Madhubala – Ek Ishq Ek Junoon and Savdhaan India as Gauri. In the same year 2012, she also portrayed the role of Laxmi's Sister Pallavi in DD National's Bin Bitiya Swarg Adhoora. in 2013, she was cast in another episode of Savdhaan India as Gomti. In 2014, she guest starred on Haunted Nights and CID. In June 2014, she was cast as in the television series Suhani Si Ek Ladki as Suhani. In April 2018, she joined Star Plus's Ikyawann as Sarthi Mishra. After a brief role in Yehh Jadu Hai Jinn Ka, she was also seen as Rupa Raunak Rajput in Namak Issk Ka, on Colors TV. Currently she is seen in Star Plus show Imlie as Arpita Singh Rathore.

== Personal life ==
On 20 November 2020, she married her former co-star Gaurav Mukesh Jain in Gwalior.

== Filmography ==
=== Television ===
Year	Title	Role	Notes
2012	Madhubala – Ek Ishq Ek Junoon	Salon worker	Cameo; Episode 16
2012–2013	Bin Bitiya Swarg Adhoora	Pallavi	
2013	Ek Kiran Roshni Ki	Rashmi	
2013	Savdhaan India	Neha Roy	
2014	Haunted Nights	Geetika Sharma	
2014	CID	Vrushika Chauhan	
2014–2017	Suhani Si Ek Ladki	Suhani Srivastav	
2015	Tere Sheher Mein	Suhani Srivastav	Special appearance
2015	Yeh Hai Mohabbatein	Suhani Srivastav	Special appearance
2016	Saath Nibhaana Saathiya	Suhani Srivastav	Special appearance
2017	Yeh Rishta Kya Kehlata Hai	Suhani Srivastav	Special appearance
2018	Ikyawann	Sarthi Mishra	
2019	Yehh Jadu Hai Jinn Ka!	Huma Ali	
2020–2021	Namak Issk Ka	Rupa Verma	
2021	Sindoor Ki Keemat	Vidya	
2021–2023	Imlie	Arpita Singh Rathore	
2022	Ravivaar With Star Parivaar	Arpita Singh Rathore	Episode 3/5/16
