= Imran Nazir Khan =

Indian actor

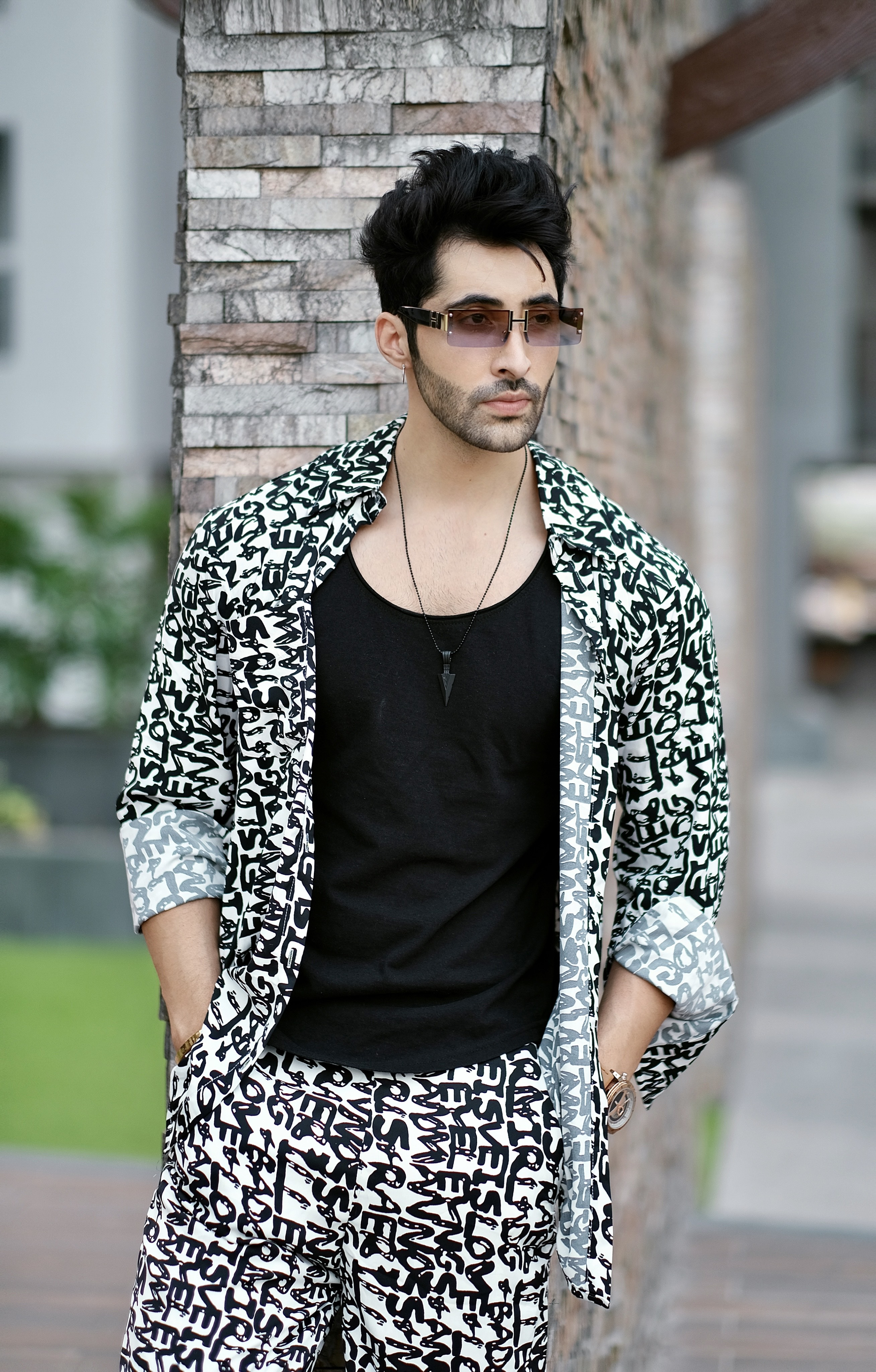
- Occupation: Actor
- Years active: 2019–present

Imran Nazir Khan is an Indian actor. Khan gained recognition through appearances in Indian television serials including Humari Bahu Silk, Bhabiji Ghar Par Hain, Main Hoon Aparajita, and Meri Bhavya Life. He later expanded into digital streaming content with roles in projects such as State of Siege: 26/11. In 2025, Imran Nazir Khan won the reality competition show Tribeverse.

== Career ==
Khan made his acting debut in the year 2019 with the TV series Abhay playing role as DJ Yoko. In the same year he acted as Director Ganesh in TV series Gathbandhan, as Rahul in Humari Bahu Silk and as Firdous in Aladdin. In 2020, Khan played as Brogon in the film State of Siege: 26/11. He acted in TV series Pratiksha in the year 2021. In 2023, he played character Timmi in Tv Serial Bhabiji Ghar Par Hain. In the same year He played lead character Rajveer Singhania in web series Devil Se Shaadi and He played lead Character Acp Kabir Chauhan in TV Series Main Hoon Aparajita

== Filmography ==
Year	Movie/TV Series	Character	refs.
2019	Abhay	DJ Yoko	
2019	Gathbandhan	Director Ganesh	
2019	Humari Bahu Silk	Rahul	
2019	Aladdin	Firdous	
2020	State of Siege: 26/11	Brogon	
2021	Pratiksha	589	
2023	BhabiJi Ghar Par Hain	Timmy	
2023	Main Hoon Aparajita	A.C.P Kabir Chauhan	
2023	Devil Se shaadi	Rajveer Singhania	
2024	Shadi Mein Syapa	Ronit	
2025	Meri Bhavya Life	Samay Jaiswal	
