= Suhani Si Ek Ladki =

Indian television series

- Genre: Soap opera
- Created by: Suzana Ghai
- Written by: Ved Raj; Sudhir Kumar Singh; Sharad Tripathi, Abhijith Singha
- Directed by: Aman Deep Singh; Ranjeet Singh Rathore; Rahul Tiwari
- Starring: See below
- Opening theme: Ha Mujhe Bhi Ho Gya Yeh Pyar Hai, Yeh Ishq Hai
- Country of origin: India
- Original language: Hindi
- No. of episodes: 1,024

Production
- Producers: Suzana Ghai; Hemant Ruprell; Ranjeet Thakur
- Production locations: Allahabad; Mumbai; Goa
- Camera setup: Multi-camera
- Running time: 21 minutes
- Production company: Panorama Entertainment

Original release
- Network: Star Plus
- Release: 9 June 2014 – 21 May 2017

Suhani Si Ek Ladki (transl. A Beautiful Girl Suhani) is an Indian romantic drama television series that aired on Star Plus from 9 June 2014 to 21 May 2017. It starred Sahil Mehta, Rajshri Rani, Neha Yadav, and Gaurav Mukesh Jain. The series is about the romantic relationship between characters Yuvraj and Suhani.

== Plot ==
Suhani, a vivacious dark-skinned girl, hails from a middle-class family in Allahabad and is best friends with a beautiful and slightly vain Soumya. Yuvraj Birla, a rich man falls in love with and proposes to Soumya, who mistakenly thinks Yuvraj is in love with Suhani. Soumya herself is in love with Krishna. Soumya elopes with Krishna but their marriage ends shortly after because of Soumya's mother-in-law Latika, and sister-in-law Rakhi creating discord between the couple.

On the other hand, circumstances lead to Suhani's father blackmailing Yuvraj into marrying Suhani. Suhani's marriage starts with difficulties as Yuvraj does not love her and Yuvraj's grandmother and matriarch of the family, Chandrakala hates Suhani for her dark skin and her middle-class background. A few months later, after Soumya leaves Krishna's house, Suhani invites her to come stay with the Birlas. Chandrakala and Yuvraj's sisters-in-law - Ragini and Menka - try to get Soumya and Yuvraj together. Soumya starts falling in love with Yuvraj who does not return her affections.

Suhani is heartbroken at Soumya's intentions to break up her marriage but with Yuvraj's help, she is able to reunite Soumya and Krishna. However, Suhani leaves the Birla house feeling unloved in her marriage. When Mr. Saxena threatens the Birla family, Suhani comes to their aid. Chandrakala's relative Rohan falls in love with Suhani and at their wedding, Yuvraj realises his love for Suhani. Rohan steps out of the way and Suhani and Yuvraj finally unite.

Suhani's sister Bhavna is widowed and circumstances lead to her marrying Yuvraj's close friend Sharad. Bhavna and Sharad begin living with the Birlas. Chandrakala tries to create a rift between Suhani and Bhavna. A young girl saves Suhani's life and turns out to be the long-lost Gauri Birla. Suhani and Yuvraj decide to use a surrogate - Barbie who later tries to separate them and abducts Suhani. A missing Suhani is now presumed dead. Chandrakala forces Yuvraj to marry Barbie, but Suhani returns and reveals Barbie isn't pregnant. Consequently, she is thrown out of the house. Suhani and Soumya become pregnant. Barbie and Saajan plant a bomb in the Birla house with the resulting explosion killing Krishna and Gauri.

=== 7 years later ===
Suhani gives birth to twins. Yuvaan lives with her and Yuvaani lives with Yuvraj. Yuvraj and Suhani have separated after Yuvraj blamed her for letting Saajan stay and cause the explosion. Soumya lives in the Birla house with her daughter Krishna. Upon becoming a successful fashion designer, Suhani learns Yuvaani is alive and visits the Birlas. She and Yuvraj decide to remarry for Yuvaan and Yuvaani's sake.

On their wedding day, Chandrakala replaces Yuvraj with Sambhav. Chandrakala tries to kill Suhani and Yuvraj tries to find the culprit; Sambhav protects Chandrakala. It is revealed the real culprit is Chandrakala's evil twin sister Lavanya, who has kept the real Chandrakala in captivity. Suhani exposes her truth and Lavanya is sent to jail. Unaware of Sambhav's role in the conspiracy, Suhani remains married to him. He mistreats and threatens her with harming Yuvraj to make her obey him. Yuvraj discovers his plan and rescues Suhani, but Sambhav shoots him in the leg and rapes Suhani. She and Yuvraj burn him alive.

=== 20 years later ===
Suhani lives in Goa with Pratima and Krishna. Yuvraj is in jail for Sambhav's murder and returns in disguise. Sayyam comes to avenge Sambhav's death. Yuvraj's true identity is revealed. Sayyam tries to kill him but fails and forces Suhani to get him married to Krishna who is actually in love with Yuvaan. Suhani is forced to acquiesce. Krishna now hates her as she gets Baby married to Yuvaan.

Sambhav is actually alive and disguised as Yuvraj, having kidnapped the real Yuvraj. Suhani and Chandrakala find out, and join forces to free Yuvraj and expose Sambhav's identity. Sayyam tries to kill Sambhav but Yuvraj and Suhani stop him. Gradually, Sayyam and Krishna fall for each other. Yuvaan is unhappy having Sayyam living with them and tries to have him leave. Later, he accepts Sayyam and realises he has erred by marrying Baby. He tries to win back Krishna's love. As Yuvaan finds out she is falling for Sayyam, he tries to create a rift between them but it brings them closer. Baby tries to sow discord between Chandrakala and Suhani. Krishna is pregnant. Baby kills Yuvaan.

Suhani tries to get rid of Baby but is accused of killing Yuvaan. Baby blackmails Yuvraj to marry her. Suhani is heartbroken and Krishna miscarries. Baby shoots Yuvraj to death and gets arrested. Suhani gets pregnant with Yuvraj's child and gives it to Krishna and Sayyam. Chandrakala accepts Suhani. The whole family stands together and Suhani remembers Yuvraj.

== Cast ==
=== Main ===
- Rajshri Rani as Suhani Srivastav Birla – Pankaj and Lata's younger daughter; Aditya and Bhavna's sister; Soumya's best friend; Yuvraj's widow; Sambhav's ex-wife; Yuvaan, Yuvaani, Sayyam and Riddhi's mother; Jr. Krishna's adoptive mother
- Sahil Mehta as Yuvraj Birla – Pratima and Sunil's second son; Saurabh, Anuj and Gauri's brother; Sharad's cousin; Soumya's former love interest; Suhani's husband; Yuvaan, Yuvaani and Riddhi's father; Sayyam's stepfather
- Neha Yadav as Soumya Malhotra – Rukmini's daughter; Yuvraj's former love interest; Suhani's best friend; Krishna's widow; Jr. Krishna's mother
- Ankur Verma as Krishna Mathur – Latika's son; Rakhi's brother; Soumya's husband; Jr. Krishna's father

=== Recurring ===
- Srishti Jain as Jr. Krishna Mathur Salvi – Soumya and Krishna's daughter; Suhani's adoptive daughter; Yuvaan's former lover; Sayyam's wife; Riddhi's adoptive mother
  - Sia Bhatia as Child Krishna
- Karan Jotwani as Sayyam Salvi – Suhani and Sambhav's son; Yuvraj's stepson; Yuvaan, Yuvaani and Riddhi's half-brother; Baby's ex-boyfriend; Jr. Krishna's husband; Riddhi's adoptive father
- Kabir Mradul as Yuvaan Birla – Suhani and Yuvraj's son; Yuvaani and Riddhi's brother; Sayyam's half-brother; Jr. Krishna's former lover; Baby's husband
  - Krishang Bhanushali as Child Yuvaan
- Sharmin Kazi as Yuvaani Birla – Suhani and Yuvraj's elder daughter; Yuvaan and Riddhi's sister; Sayyam's half-sister
  - Muskan Kalyani as Child Yuvaani
- Poulomi Das as Babita "Baby" Nair – Sayyam's ex-girlfriend; Yuvaan's wife; Yuvaan and Yuvraj's murderer
- Alekh Sangal as Sambhav Salvi – Lavanya's accomplice; Suhani's ex-husband; Sayyam's father
- Shashi Sharma as
  - Chandrakala Devi Bajpai – Matriarch of Birla family; Lavanya's twin sister; Sunil's mother; Saurabh, Yuvraj, Anuj and Gauri's grandmother
  - Lavanya Bajpai – Chandrakala's twin sister
- Rajoshi Vidyarthi as Pratima Devi – Sunil's widow; Saurabh, Yuvraj, Anuj and Gauri's mother; Yuvaan, Yuvaani and Riddhi's grandmother
- Vijay Tilani/Nikhil Sharma as Saurabh Birla – Pratima and Sunil's eldest son; Yuvraj, Anuj and Gauri's brother; Sharad's cousin; Ragini's husband
- Sonu Chandrapal/Deiya Sindhi as Ragini "Rags" Vandheer Birla – Saurabh's wife
- Leenesh Mattoo as Anuj Birla – Pratima and Sunil's youngest son; Saurabh, Yuvraj and Gauri's brother; Sharad's cousin; Menaka's husband
- Debashree Biswas as Menaka Varma Birla – Anuj's wife
- Ekroop Bedi as Gauri Birla Srivastav – Pratima and Sunil's daughter; Saurabh, Yuvraj and Anuj's sister; Sharad's cousin; Aditya's wife
- Vikas Grover as Aditya Srivastav – Lata and Pankaj's son; Suhani and Bhavna's brother; Gauri's husband
- Chandresh Singh as Pankaj Srivastav – Lata's husband; Suhani, Aditya and Bhavna's father; Golu, Yuvaan, Yuvaani, Sayyam and Riddhi's grandfather
- Falguni Mistry as Lata Sethi Srivastav – Pankaj's wife; Suhani, Aditya and Bhavna's mother; Golu, Yuvaan, Yuvaani, Sayyam and Riddhi's grandmother
- Divjot Sabarwal as Bhavna Srivastav – Lata and Pankaj's elder daughter; Suhani and Aditya's sister; Amit's widow; Sharad's wife; Golu's mother
- Gaurav Mukesh Jain as Sharad Mishra – Saurabh, Yuvraj, Anuj and Gauri's cousin; Bhavna's second husband; Golu's stepfather
- Rahul Dwivedi as Ramesh Chandani – The servant of Birlas
- Hetal Yadav as Latika Kumari Mathur – Krishna and Rakhi's mother; Jr. Krishna's grandmother
- Shital Dimri/Diya Makhija as Rakhi Mathur – Latika's daughter; Krishna's sister; Radhe's wife
- Mohit Keswani as Amit Joshi – Bhavna's first husband; Golu's father
- Sonam Bisht as Balwinder "Barbie" Chawla – A surrogate woman hired by Yuvraj and Suhani; Krishna and Gauri's murderer
- Mallika Nayak as Rukmini Malhotra – Soumya's mother; Jr. Krishna's grandmother

== Production ==
=== Development ===
The show was produced by Panorama Entertainment and writer Suzana Ghai, and replaced Ek Ghar Banaunga.

Nikhil Madhok, senior vice president of marketing at Star Plus said, "With Suhaani Si Ek Ladki, we hope to further strengthen our bond with the youth. Over the last one year, Star Plus' viewership amongst all demographics has increased significantly on the back of fresh engaging content. However, progressive young women have forged a specially strong bond with us. This show will resonate with them, highlighting their dreams and aspirations and a take on love that they will find refreshing".

Speaking about her role, Rajshri Rani Jain said, "Suhani is simple, innocent, pure at heart. She finds good in everyone and loves her family but what makes her different from other characters is that she is funny, cracks jokes and does not cry. Suhani is soft-spoken but gives back to people, if they are mean to her, she sweetly tells them off." Neha Yadav stated that she took inspiration from Kareena Kapoor in Jab We Met for her role of Soumya. Sahil Mehta made his television debut with the series after his Bollywood career did not succeed.

=== Casting ===
Due to the twenty-year leap in the storyline, actor Sahil Mehta quit the show because he "[did] not want to play an old character". He later returned to the show by popular demand. Leading cast Neha Yadav and Debashree Biswas also left the show. Ankita Sharma was initially approached by the show but had to pull out due to an accident. She was replaced by Sristi Jain. After Mehta's exit, Gaurav Mukesh quit in March 2017.

== Adaptations ==
Language	Title	Original release	Network(s)	Last aired	Notes
Marathi	Muramba मुरांबा	14 February 2022	Star Pravah	28 June 2026	Remake
Hindi	Meetha Khatta Pyaar Hamara मीठा खट्टा प्यार हमारा	24 April 2024	StarPlus	10 July 2024	Remake
Tamil	Kanmani Anbudan கண்மணி அன்புடன்	16 September 2024	Star Vijay	Ongoing	Remake
