= Jhalak Dikhhla Jaa =

Indian reality television show

- Also known as: Dancing With The Stars
- Genre: Dance; Entertainment; Reality show
- Based on: Strictly Come Dancing
- Written by: Hemant Kher; Manoj Muntashir
- Directed by: Tania Bath; Huzefa Qaiser
- Creative directors: Priya Vagal; Ankit Arora
- Presented by: Parmeet Sethi; Archana Puran Singh; Rohit Roy; Shiv Panditt; Mona Singh; Shweta Tiwari; Sumeet Raghavan; Ragini Khanna; Kapil Sharma; Drashti Dhami; Ranvir Shorey; Manish Paul; Arjun Bijlani; Rithvik Dhanjani; Gauahar Khan
- Judges: See Below
- Narrated by: Vijay Vikram Singh
- Country of origin: India
- Original language: Hindi
- No. of seasons: 11
- No. of episodes: 303

Production
- Executive producer: Sneha Menon
- Producers: Deepali Handa; Sameer Gogate
- Cinematography: Surindra Rao; Nitesh Choudhary
- Camera setup: Multi-camera
- Running time: 90–120 minutes
- Production company: BBC Studios India

Original release
- Network: Sony Entertainment Television
- Release: 7 September 2006 – 6 March 2011
- Network: Colors TV
- Release: 16 June 2012 – 27 November 2022
- Network: Sony Entertainment Television
- Release: 11 November 2023 – present

Jhalak Dikhhla Jaa is an Indian Hindi-language reality television show and the Indian version of the British reality TV competition Strictly Come Dancing and is part of the Dancing with the Stars franchise. The first four seasons of Jhalak Dikhhla Jaa were aired on Sony TV. Season fifth to tenth were aired Colors TV then again from season 11, the broadcasting network was changed back to Sony Entertainment Television.

== Format ==
The show pairs celebrities with professional dancers. Each couple performs predetermined dances and competes against the others for judges' points and audience votes. The couple receiving the lowest combined total of judges' points and audience votes is eliminated each week until only the champion dance pair remains.

The show's format is taken from the Strictly Come Dancing show on BBC One in the United Kingdom. The show is also pre-recorded, unlike Strictly Come Dancing and other spin-offs. Of the spin offs, the Jhalak Dikhhla Jaa is the only one that uses recorded tracks rather than live music with an in-house band. The title derives from "Jhalak Dikhlaja" (Let Me Have a Glimpse of You), a song from the film Aksar (2006), composed and sung by Himesh Reshammiya.

Although the show features mixed-sex couples, but the tenth season saw, for the first time, the participation of same-sex couple Dutee Chand and Raveena Choudhary (considering that Gaurav Gera in ninth season performed as fictional character-Chutki).

=== Elimination ===
The show airs its elimination on a Sunday in every season. The elimination procedure varied for number of seasons. The show adopted the following elimination methods:

- Judges' Pick from the bottom-two/three/four.
- Direct elimination based on combined judges' scores and public votes.
- Dance-off of bottom-two and judges' scoring.

== Cast ==
=== Hosts ===
Color key

Host
Co-host
Contestant
Professional dancer

Cast member	Season											
Cast member	1 2006	2 2007	3 2009	4 2010	5 2012	6 2013	7 2014	8 2015	9 2016	10 2022	11 2023	12 2025
Archana Puran Singh	●											
Parmeet Sethi	●											
Rohit Roy (Note: Roy replaced Shiv Panditt in the third season.)		●	●			●						
Shiv Panditt			●									
Shweta Tiwari			●			●						
Gauahar Khan			●								●	
Mona Singh	●	●		●								
Sumeet Raghavan				●								
Ragini Khanna				●	●							
Manish Paul (Note: Paul replaced Drashti Dhami in the seventh season.) (Note: Arjun Bijlani was a guest host in the tenth week of the tenth season as Paul was unwell.)					●	●	●	●	●	●		
Rithvik Dhanjani					●						●	
Kapil Sharma						●						
Drashti Dhami						●	●					
Ranvir Shorey							●					

=== Judges ===
Color key

Judge
Guest judge
Contestant
Professional dancer

Cast member	Season											
Cast member	1 2006	2 2007	3 2009	4 2010	5 2012	6 2013	7 2014	8 2015	9 2016	10 2022	11 2023	12 2025
Shilpa Shetty	●											
Sanjay Leela Bhansali	●											
Farah Khan (Note: Khan joined as guest judge replacing Hegde in the ninth season as a remaining judge.)	●								●		●	
Urmila Matondkar		●										
Jeetendra		●										
Shiamak Davar		●										
Juhi Chawla			●									
Saroj Khan			●									
Vaibhavi Merchant			●									
Prabhu Deva			●									
Remo D'Souza				●	●	●	●					
Madhuri Dixit				●	●	●	●			●		
Malaika Arora (Note: Arora joined as guest judge Johar in the eighth season as a remaining judge)				●				●			●	
Lauren Gottlieb						●		●				
Ganesh Hegde								●	●			
Maksim Chmerkovskiy							●					
Nora Fatehi									●	●		
Karan Johar					●	●	●	●	●	●		
Terrence Lewis										●		
Arshad Warsi											●	

=== Professional dancers ===
Professional dancer	Season										
Professional dancer	1 2006	2 2007	3 2009	4 2010	5 2012	6 2013	7 2014	8 2015	9 2016	10 2022	11 2023
Toby Fernandez	●	●	●								
Nicole Alvares	●	●	●								
Sonia Jaffer	●		●			●					
Feroz Khan	●	●									
Hanif Hillal	●		●								
Longinus Fernandes	●										
Bindi Khare	●										
Rhea Krishnatraye	●										
Bindi Khare		●									
Tanushree Rakshit		●									
Uma Shankar		●									
Hemu Sinha		●									
Javed Sanadi		●	●								
Rozita Rajput		●	●								
Tina Sachdeva		●	●								
Himanshu Gadani			●								
Lilian			●								
Nishant Bhatt			●	●	●						
Salman Yusuff Khan				●	●	●					
Deepak Singh		●	●		●	●	●	●			
Marischa Fernandes		●	●	●		●		●			
Savio			●	●	●	●	●				
Shampa Gopikrishna				●	●		●				
Neerav Bavlecha				●							
Priti				●							
Vrushali				●							
Robin				●							
Sneha Kapoor				●	●	●	●	●			
Jai Kumar Nair				●				●	●		
Punit Pathak				●	●	●	●				
Mohena Singh					●	●	●				
Avneet Kaur					●						
Kunjan					●						
Alisha Singh					●				●		
Diwakar Nayal					●		●	●	●		
Sanam Johar					●			●	●	●	
Suchitra Sawant					●	●		●	●	●	
Ankita					●	●					
Sumanth						●					
Shashank						●					
Tushar Kalia						●	●				
Sharmishtha						●					
Cornel Rodrigues						●			●		
Sushant Singh Rajput						●					
Amrita						●					
Bhavna Khanduja						●	●	●	●		
Elena							●				
Vaishnavi Patil							●	●	●	●	●
Jack							●				
Kruti							●				
Rajit Dev							●	●	●		
Bhavini							●				
Rishikayash								●			
Dhiraj								●			
Falon								●			
Aryan Patra									●		
Aishwarya Radhakrishnan									●		
Preetjot Singh									●		
Hardik Rupanali									●		
Sachin Sharma									●		
Bhavna Purohit									●		
Pranalini Atul									●		
Priyanka Shah									●		
Raveena Choudhary										●	
Nischhal Sharma										●	
Shyam Yadav										●	
Shweta Sharda										●	
Pratik Utekar										●	
Tejas Verma										●	
Vaibhav Ghughe								●			●
Lipsa Acharya										●	●
Sneha Singh										●	●
Tarun Raj Nilhani										●	●
Akash Thapa										●	●
Anuradha Iyengar										●	●
Vivek Chachere										●	●
Romsha Singh										●	●

== Series overview ==
Season	Contestants	Episodes	Originally Aired		Network	Winners	Runners-up	Third place
Season	Contestants	Episodes	First aired	Last aired	Network	Winners	Runners-up	Third place
1	8	20	7 September 2006	4 November 2006	SET	Mona Singh & Toby Fernandez	Shweta Salve & Longines Fernandes	Mahesh Manjrekar & Sonia Jaffer
2	12	24	28 September 2007	15 December 2007	SET	Prachi Desai & Deepak Singh	Sandhya Mridul & Javed Sanadi	Jay Bhanushali & Bindi Khare
3	12	29	27 February 2009	31 May 2009	SET	Baichung Bhutia & Sonia Jaffer	Gauahar Khan & Hanif Hilal	Karan Singh Grover & Nicole
4	12	25	12 December 2010	6 March 2011	SET	Meiyang Chang & Marischa Fernandez	Sushant Singh Rajput & Shampa Gopikrishna	Yana Gupta & Salman
5	16	32	16 June 2012	30 September 2012	Colors TV	Gurmeet Choudhary & Shampa Gopikrishna	Rashami Desai & Deepak Singh	Rithvik Dhanjani & Sneha Kapoor
6	15	31	1 June 2013	14 September 2013	Colors TV	Drashti Dhami & Salman Yusuff Khan	Lauren Gottlieb & Punit Pathak	Sonali Majumdar & Sumanth Maroju
7	16	31	7 June 2014	20 September 2014	Colors TV	Ashish Sharma & Shampa Gopikrishna	Karan Tacker & Bhawna Khanduja	Shakti Mohan & Tushar Kalia
8	16	27	11 July 2015	10 October 2015	Colors TV	Faisal Khan & Vaishnavi	Sanaya Irani & Jai Kumar Nair	Shamita Shetty & Deepak
9	18	26	30 July 2016	21 January 2017	Colors TV	Teriya Magar & Aryan Patra	Salman Yusuff Khan & Aishwarya Radhakrishnan	Shantanu Maheshwari & Alisha Singh
10	16	26	3 September 2022	27 November 2022	Colors TV	Gunjan Sinha & Tejas Verma	Rubina Dilaik & Sanam Johar	Faisal Shaikh & Vaishnavi Patil
11	17	32	11 November 2023	2 March 2024	SET	Manisha Rani & Ashutosh Pawar	Shoaib Ibrahim & Anuradha Iyengar; Adrija Sinha & Akash Thapa	

=== Series 1 (2006) ===
Jhalak Dikhhla Jaa
- Season 1
- Hosted by: Parmeet Sethi; Archana Puran Singh
- Judges: Farah Khan; Sanjay Leela Bhansali; Shilpa Shetty
- No. of contestants: 8
- Celebrity winner: Mona Singh
- Professional winner: Toby Fernandez
- No. of episodes: 20

Release
- Original network: Sony India
- Original release: 7 September – 4 November 2006

Series chronology
- Next → Season 2

The first season of the dance reality show, Jhalak Dikhhla Jaa premiered on 7 September 2006 until 4 November 2006. The season was judged by Sanjay Leela Bhansali, Shilpa Shetty and Farah Khan. The season was hosted by Parmeet Sethi and Archana Puran Singh. The winner was Mona Singh. The contestants were:

Celebrity	Notability	Professional partner	Result
Pooja Bedi	Actress	Hanif Hillal	Eliminated 1st
Rati Agnihotri	Actress	Feroz Khan	Eliminated 2nd
Sanjeev Kapoor	Indian chef	Nicole Alvares	Eliminated 3rd
Akashdeep Saigal	Actor & Model	Bindi Khare	Eliminated 4th
Ajay Jadeja	Cricketer	Rhea Krishnatraye	Eliminated 5th
Mahesh Manjrekar	Actor & Bollywood producer	Sonia Jaffer	Eliminated 6th
Shweta Salve	Television actress	Longines Fernandes	Runners-up
Mona Singh	Television actress	Toby Fernandez	Winners

=== Series 2 (2007) ===
Jhalak Dikhhla Jaa
- Season 2
- Presented by: Rohit Roy; Mona Singh
- No. of contestants: 12
- Celebrity winner: Prachi Desai
- Professional winner: Deepak Singh
- No. of episodes: 24

Release
- Original network: Sony Entertainment Television
- Original release: 7 September (Launch Show); 28 September 2007 – 15 December 2007

Series chronology
- ← Previous; Season 1 Next → Season 3

Jhalak Dikhhla Jaa 2 is the second season of the dance reality show, Jhalak Dikhhla Jaa. It premiered on 28 September 2007 until 15 December 2007.

Shiamak Davar, Urmila Matondkar and Jeetendra were the judges. Bipasha Basu appeared as a guest judge. Rohit Roy and Mona Singh were the hosts. Prachi Desai and Deepak were the winners. The contestants were:

Celebrity	Notability	Professional partner	Result
Aadesh Srivastava	Music Composer	Tina Sachdeva	Eliminated 1st
Tapur Chatterjee	Model	Feroz Khan	Eliminated 2nd
Mini Mathur	Presenter	Hemu Sinha	Eliminated 3rd
Cyrus Broacha	Presenter	Rozita Rajput	Eliminated 4th
Sudha Chandran	Actress	Uma Shankar	Eliminated 5th
Mika Singh	Singer	Tanushree Rakshit	Eliminated 7th
Ronit Roy	Actor	Nicole Alvares	Eliminated 8th
Sonali Kulkarni	Actress	Toby Fernandez	Eliminated 9th
Mir Ranjan Negi	Hockey Player	Marischa Fernandes	Eliminated 10th
Jay Bhanushali	Actor	Bindi Khare	Third place
Sandhya Mridul	Actress	Javed Sanadi	Runners-up
Prachi Desai	Actress	Deepak Singh	Eliminated 6th
Prachi Desai	Actress	Deepak Singh	Winners

=== Series 3 (2009) ===
The season began on 27 February 2009.

Celebrity	Notability	Professional partner	Result
Bhagyashree Dassani	Actress	Toby Fernandez	Eliminated 1st
Ugesh Sarcar	Magician	Tina Sachdeva	Eliminated 2nd
Anand Raaj Anand	Music composer & Singer	Rozita Rajput	Eliminated 3rd
Mohinder Amarnath	Cricketer	Lillian Mendes	Eliminated 4th
Ram Kapoor	Actor	Marischa Fernandes	Eliminated 5th
Monica Bedi	Actress	Javed Sanadi	Eliminated 7th
Shilpa Shukla	Actress	Nishant Bhat	Eliminated 8th
Parul Chauhan	Actress	Deepak Singh	Eliminated 9th
Hard Kaur	Rapper	Savio Barnes	Eliminated 10th
Karan Singh Grover	Actor	Nicole Alvares	Third place
Gauahar Khan	Model	Himanshu Gadani (earlier Hanif Hilal)	Eliminated 6th
Gauahar Khan	Model	Himanshu Gadani (earlier Hanif Hilal)	Runners-up
Bhaichung Bhutia	Footballer	Sonia Jaffer	Winners

=== Series 4 (2010) ===
The fourth season began on 12 December 2010.

Celebrity	Notability	Professional partner	Result
Anushka Manchanda	Singer	Punit Pathak	Eliminated 1st
Renuka Shahane	Actress	Jai Kumar Nair	Eliminated 2nd
Akhil Kumar	Boxer	Sneha Kapoor	Eliminated 3rd
Krushna Abhishek	Comedian	Robin Merchant	Eliminated 4th
Dayanand Shetty	CID actor	Vrushali Chawan	Eliminated 5th
Shekhar Suman	Actor	Priti Gupta	Eliminated 7th
Ragini Khanna	Actress	Neerav Bavlecha	Eliminated 8th
Ankita Lokhande	Actress	Nishant Bhat	Eliminated 9th
Mahhi Vij	Actress	Savio Barnes	Eliminated 10th
Yana Gupta	Actress	Salman Yusuff Khan	Third place
Sushant Singh Rajput	Actor	Shampa Gopikrishna	Runners-up
Meiyang Chang	Dentist	Marischa Fernandes	Winners

=== Series 5 (2012) ===
The season began in June 2012. The season saw a change in its presenters and judges. Manish Paul and season 4 contestant Ragini Khanna was confirmed to host the series. Madhuri Dixit and Remo D'Souza was retained as two of the judges whilst Karan Johar joined the panel replaced Malaika Arora.

Celebrity	Notability	Professional partner	Result
Talat Aziz	Singer	Ankita Maithy	Eliminated 1st
Sanath Jayasuriya	Cricketer	Suchitra Sawant	Eliminated 2nd
Archana Vijaya	Actress	Sanam Johar	Eliminated 3rd
Pratyusha Banerjee	Balika Vadhu actress	Deepak Singh	Eliminated 4th
Jayati Bhatia	Sasural Simar Ka actress	Diwakar Nayal	Eliminated 5th
Sushil Kumar	KBC star	Alisha Singh	Eliminated 7th
Ravi Kishan	Actor and Bigg Boss star	Kunjan Jani	Eliminated 8th
Giaa Manek	Actress	Nishant Bhat	Eliminated 9th
Shibani Dandekar	Singer	Punit Pathak	Eliminated 10th
Darsheel Safary	Actor	Avneet Kaur	Eliminated 11th
Karan Wahi	Actor and model	Mohena Singh	Eliminated 12th
Bharti Singh	Comedian	Savio Barnes	Withdrew
Isha Sharvani	Actress	Salman Yusuff Khan	Withdrew
Rithvik Dhanjani	Actor and dancer	Sneha Kapoor	Third place
Rashami Desai	Uttaran actress	Shampa Gopikrishna	Runners-up
Gurmeet Choudhary	Actor	Shampa Gopikrishna	Winners

=== Series 6 (2013) ===
The sixth season began in June 2013. Paul retained his position as the presenter whilst Kapil Sharma replaced Ragini Khanna. Dixit, D’Souza and Johar was also returned to the judging panel.

Celebrity	Notability	Professional partner	Result
Eijaz Khan	Actor	Bhawna Khanduja	Withdrew
Suresh Menon	Comedian	Suchitra Sawant	Eliminated 1st
Krishnamachari Srikkanth	Cricketer	Amrita Maitra	Eliminated 2nd
Meghna Malik	Na Aana Is Des Laado actress	Sanam Johar	Eliminated 3rd
Ekta Kaul	Actress	Tushar Kalia	Eliminated 4th
Shweta Tiwari	Actress and Bigg Boss 4 winner	Sushant Pujari (later Savio Barnes)	Eliminated 5th
Aarti Chabria	Bollywood actress	Cornel Rodrigues	Eliminated 7th
Mantra Dasgupta	Actor and RJ	Ankita Maity	Eliminated 8th
Karan Patel	Actor	Sharmishtha Rao	Eliminated 9th
Karanvir Bohra	Actor	Sneha Kapoor	Eliminated 10th
Sidharth Shukla	Balika Vadhu actor and model	Sonia Jaffer (later Mohena Singh)	Eliminated 11th
Sana Saeed	Kuch Kuch Hota Hai actress	Tushar Kalia	Eliminated 12th
Mukti Mohan	Actress and dancer	Altaf Iqbal (later Shashank Dogra)	Eliminated 13th
Shaan Mukherjee	Singer	Marischa Fernandes	Fourth place
Sonali Majumdar	India's Got Talent winner	Sumanth Maroju	Third place
Lauren Gottlieb	So You Think You Can Dance star and dancer	Punit Pathak	Runners-up
Drashti Dhami	Madhubala – Ek Ishq Ek Junoon actress	Salman Yusuff Khan	Winners

=== Series 7 (2014) ===
The season began in June 2014. There was a change in its presenters as Ranvir Shorey and season 6 winner Drashti Dhami were roped in as the hosts. Dhami later got replaced by Manish Paul.

Celebrity	Notability	Professional partner	Result
Andy Kumar	VJ and Bigg Boss star	Bhavini Mishra	Eliminated 1st
Purab Kohli	Bollywood actor	Mohena Singh	Eliminated 2nd
Kritika Kamra	Actress	Savio Barnes	Eliminated 3rd
Sukhwinder Singh	Singer	Bhawna Khanduja	Eliminated 4th
Sreesanth Nair	Cricketer	Sneha Kapoor	Eliminated 5th
Puja Banerjee	Actress	Rajit Dev	Eliminated 7th
Kushal Punjabi	Actor and model	Mohena Singh	Eliminated 8th
Malishka Mendonsa	RJ	Diwakar Nayal	Eliminated 9th
Kiku Sharda	Comedian	Kruti Mahesh	Eliminated 10th
Tara Jean Popowich	So You Think You Can Dance star and dancer	Jack Samuel	Eliminated 11th
Sophie Choudry	Actress, VJ and singer	Deepak Singh	Eliminated 12th
Akshat Singh	India's Got Talent star	Vaishnavi Patil	Eliminated 13th
Mouni Roy	Actress	Punit Pathak	Fourth place
Shakti Mohan	Dancer	Tushar Kalia	Third place
Karan Tacker	Actor and model	Elena Samodanova (later Bhawna Khanduja)	Runners-up
Ashish Sharma	Rangrasiya actor	Shampa Gopikrishna	Winners

=== Series 8 (2015) ===
The season began in July 2015. Shahid Kapoor and season 6 runner-up Lauren Gottlieb replaced Dixit and D'Souza whilst Karan Johar was retained as judges. Manish Paul was retained as the presenter.

Celebrity	Notability	Professional partner	Result
Dipika Kakar	Sasural Simar Ka actress	Vaibhav Ghuge	Eliminated 1st
Kavita Kaushik	Actress	Rajiv Dev	Eliminated 2nd
Radhika Madan	Meri Aashiqui Tum Se Hi Actress	Rishikaysh Jogdande	Eliminated 3rd
Irfan Pathan	Cricketer	Suchitra Sawant	Withdrew
Ashish Chaudhary	Bollywood actor	Falon Netto	Eliminated 4th
Subhreet Kaur Ghumman	India's Got Talent star	Diwakar Nayal	Eliminated 5th
Vivian Dsena	Madhubala – Ek Ishq Ek Junoon actor	Bhawna Khanduja	Eliminated 6th
Raftaar Nair	Rapper	Sneha Kapoor	Eliminated 7th
Scarlett Wilson	Actress and dancer	Dhiraj Bakshi	Eliminated 8th
Roopal Tyagi	Actress and dancer	Rishikaysh Jogdande	Eliminated 9th
Neha Marda	Balika Vadhu actress	Rajit Dev	Eliminated 10th
Anita Hassanandani	Actress	Sanam Johar	Eliminated 11th
Mohit Malik	Actor and model	Marischa Fernandes	Fourth place
Shamita Shetty	Bollywood actress and Bigg Boss star	Deepak Singh	Third place
Sanaya Irani	Rangrasiya actress	Jai Kumar Nair	Runners-up
Faisal Khan	Dancer and actor	Vaishnavi Patil	Winners

=== Series 9 (2016) ===
The ninth season began in July 2016. PManish Paul was confirmed to return as the presenter of the series. In June 2016, Jacqueline Fernandez, Karan Johar and Ganesh Hegde were confirmed as the judges.

Celebrity	Notability	Professional partner	Result
Gaurav Gera	Comedian	Diwakar Nayal	Eliminated 1st
Priyanka Shah	Dancer	Poonam Shah	Eliminated 2nd
Harpal Singh Sokhi	Chef	Bhavna Purohit	Eliminated 3rd
Helly Shah	Swaragini – Jodein Rishton Ke Sur actress	Jai Kumar Nair	Eliminated 4th
Sidhant Gupta	Actor and model	Pranalini Atul /Sneha Singh	Eliminated 5th
Arjun Bijlani	Naagin actor	Bhawna Khanduja	Eliminated 6th
Surveen Chawla	Bollywood and Punjabi actress	Sanam Johar	Eliminated 7th
Gracy Goswami	Balika Vadhu actress	Sachin Sharma	Eliminated 9th
Nora Fatehi	Bollywood actress and Bigg Boss star	Cornel Rodrigues	Eliminated 10th
Spandan Chaturvedi	Udaan actress	Hardik Bora	Eliminated 11th
Shakti Arora	Meri Aashiqui Tum Se Hi actor	Suchitra Sawant	Eliminated 12th
Karishma Tanna	Actress and Bigg Boss runner-up	Rajit Dev	Eliminated 13th
Swasti Nitya	Dancer	Preetjot Dayal	Eliminated 14th
Dwayne Bravo	Cricketer	Bhavna Purohit	Withdrew
Siddharth Nigam	Actor	Vaishnavi Patil	Eliminated 15th
Shantanu Maheshwari	Actor and dancer	Alisha Singh	Third place
Salman Yusuff Khan	Dancer	Aishwarya Radhakrishnan	Runners-up
Teriya Magar	Dancer	Aryan Patra	Eliminated 8th
Teriya Magar	Dancer	Aryan Patra	Winners

=== Series 10 (2022) ===
The tenth season began in September 2022, making its comeback after a hiatus of five years. Madhuri Dixit and Karan Johar retained their positions as judges, whilst season 9 contestant Nora Fatehi came on board as well. Terence Lewis came as a guest judge for two weeks. Manish Paul also returned as the presenter. Arjun Bijlani came as a guest anchor for a week.

Celebrity	Occupation	Professional partner	Result
Ali Asgar	Comedian	Lipsa Acharya	Eliminated 1st
Dheeraj Dhoopar	Sasural Simar Ka actor	Sneha Singh	Withdrew
Dutee Chand	Sprinter	Raveena Choudhary	Withdrew
Zorawar Kalra	Chef	Suchitra Sawant	Eliminated 2th
Shilpa Shinde	Actress	Nischhal Sharma	Eliminated 3rd
Ada Malik	Designer	Shyam Yadav	Eliminated 4th
Paras Kalnawat	Actor	Shweta Sharda	Eliminated 5th
Amruta Khanvilkar	Actress	Pratik Utekar	Eliminated 6th
Nia Sharma	Ishq Mein Marjawan actress	Tarun Raj Nihalini	Eliminated 7th
Niti Taylor	Actress	Akash Thapa	Eliminated 8th
Nishant Bhat	Dancer and Bigg Boss runner-up	Anuradha Iyengar	Eliminated 9th
Sriti Jha	Actress	Vivek Chachere	Eliminated 10th
Gashmeer Mahajani	Actor	Romsha Singh	Fourth place
Faisal Sheikh	Model	Vaishnavi Patil	Third place
Rubina Dilaik	Actress and Bigg Boss winner	Sanam Johar	Runners-up
Gunjan Sinha	Dancer	Tejas Verma	Winners

=== Series 11 (2023) ===
The eleventh season of Jhalak Dikhhla Jaa airs on Sony Entertainment Television after 12 years after the change in broadcasting network. The judging panel includes Arshad Warsi, Farah Khan and Malaika Arora. Season 5 2nd runner-up Rithvik Dhanjani and Season 3 runner-up Gauahar Khan joined as hosts.

Celebrity	Notability	Professional partner	Result
Aamir Ali	Bollywood and television actor	Sneha Singh	Eliminated 1st
Urvashi Dholakia	Bigg Boss winner and television actress	Vaibhav Ghuge	Eliminated 2nd
Rajiv Thakur	Actor and comedian	Suchitra Sawant	Eliminated 3rd
Vivek Dahiya	Bollywood and television actor	Lipsa Acharya	Eliminated 4th
Tanishaa Mukerji	Bollywood actress and Bigg Boss runner-up	Tarun Raj Nihalini	Eliminated 5th
Awez Darbar	Social media personality	Vaishnavi Patil	Withdrew
Glenn Saldanha	Radio jockey	Arundhati Garnaik	Eliminated 6th
Anjali Anand	Rocky Aur Rani Kii Prem Kahaani actress	Danny Fernandez	Eliminated 7th
Sangeeta Phogat	Wrestler	Bharat Ghare	Eliminated 8th
Karuna Pandey	Pushpa Impossible actress	Vivek Chachere	Eliminated 9th
Sagar Parekh	Anupamaa actor	Shivani Patel	Eliminated 10th
Shiv Thakare	Bigg Boss runner-up	Romsha Singh	Eliminated 11th
Sreerama Chandra	Indian Idol winner and playback singer	Sonali Kar	Finalists
Dhanashree Verma	Social media personality and Yuzvendra Chahal's ex-wife, shreyas iyer's rumoured gf.	Sagar Bora	Finalists
Adrija Sinha	Bollywood actress	Akash Thapa	Runners-up
Shoaib Ibrahim	Social Media personality and television actor	Anuradha Iyenagar	Runners-up
Manisha Rani	Social media personality and Bigg Boss OTT 2 2nd runner-up	Ashutosh Pawar	Winners

== Awards and nominations ==
Year	Award	Category	Nominee	Result
2012	People's Choice Awards India	Favorite Non-fiction Show	Jhalak Dikhhla Jaa	Nominated
2012	Colors Golden Petal Awards	Favorite Non-fiction Show	Jhalak Dikhhla Jaa	Won
2012	Colors Golden Petal Awards	Favorite Non-fiction Anchor	Maniesh Paul	Won
2012	Colors Golden Petal Awards	Favorite Non-fiction Judge	Madhuri Dixit	Won
2012	Indian Telly Awards	Best Dance Talent Show	Jhalak Dikhhla Jaa	Nominated
2012	Indian Telly Awards	Best Judge on a TV Show	Remo D'Souza, Madhuri Dixit, Malaika Arora	Nominated
2012	Indian Television Academy Awards	Best Anchor - Music & Film Based Show	Maniesh Paul	Won
2013	Gold Awards	Best Host	Maniesh Paul	Won
2013	Colors Golden Petal Awards	Favorite Host	Maniesh Paul, Kapil Sharma	Won
2013	Indian Telly Awards	Best Host	Maniesh Paul	Won
2013	Indian Telly Awards	Best Dance Talent Show	Jhalak Dikhhla Jaa	Nominated
2014	Indian Television Academy Awards	Best Anchor - Music & Film Based Show	Maniesh Paul	Won
2014	Indian Television Academy Awards	Best Anchor - Music & Film Based Show	Kapil Sharma	Nominated
2014	Asian Viewers Television Awards	Reality Show of the Year	Jhalak Dikhhla Jaa	Nominated
2014	Indian Telly Awards	Best Anchor	Maniesh Paul, Kapil Sharma	Won
2014	Indian Telly Awards	Best Judge on a TV Show	Remo D'Souza, Madhuri Dixit, Karan Johar	Nominated
2014	Indian Telly Awards	Best Weekender Show	Jhalak Dikhhla Jaa	Nominated
2014	Indian Telly Awards	Best Dance Talent Show	Jhalak Dikhhla Jaa	Won
2015	Indian Television Academy Awards	Best Anchor	Maniesh Paul	Won
2015	Asian Viewers Television Awards	Best Reality Show	Jhalak Dikhhla Jaa	Won
2015	Indian Telly Awards	Best Anchor	Maniesh Paul	Won
2015	Indian Telly Awards	Best Dance Talent Show	Jhalak Dikhhla Jaa	Nominated
2016	Indian Television Academy Awards	Best Anchor - Music & Film Based Show	Maniesh Paul	Won
2016	Asian Viewers Television Awards	Reality Show of the Year	Jhalak Dikhhla Jaa	Won
2016	Colors Golden Petal Awards	Best Host	Maniesh Paul	Won
2016	Colors Golden Petal Awards	Best Entertainment Series	Jhalak Dikhhla Jaa	Nominated
2017	Indian Television Academy Awards	Most Entertaining Personality on TV	Maniesh Paul	Won
2017	Colors Golden Petal Awards	Best Host	Maniesh Paul	Won
2017	Colors Golden Petal Awards	Best Judge	Karan Johar	Won
2023	Lions Gold Awards	Best Host	Rithvik Dhanjani	Won
2023	Nickelodeon Kids' Choice Awards India	Favourite Child Entertainer on TV	Gunjan Sinha	Nominated
2023	Talent Track Awards	Best Anchor	Maniesh Paul	Won
2023	Bollywood Life Awards	Best Reality Show Star	Niti Taylor	Nominated
