= Jhalak Dikhhla Jaa season 5 =

Jhalak Dikhhla Jaa
- Season 5
- Title screen of Jhalak Dikhla Jaa 5
- Presented by: Manish Paul; Ragini Khanna
- Judges: Remo D'Souza; Madhuri Dixit; Karan Johar
- No. of contestants: 16
- Celebrity winner: Gurmeet Choudhary
- Professional winner: Shampa Gopikrishna
- No. of episodes: 32

Release
- Original network: Colors TV
- Original release: 16 June – 30 September 2012

Season chronology
- ← Previous; Season 4 Next → Season 6

Jhalak Dikhhla Jaa 5 is the fifth season of the dance reality show, Jhalak Dikhhla Jaa. It premiered on 16 June 2012 on Colors and concluded on 30 September 2012. The series was hosted by Manish Paul and Ragini Khanna.

== Cast ==
| Celebrity | Notability | Professional partner | Result |
|---|---|---|---|
| Talat Aziz | Singer | Ankita Maithy | Eliminated 1st on 30 June 2012 |
| Sanath Jayasuriya | Cricketer | Suchitra Sawant | Eliminated 2nd on 7 July 2012 |
| Archana Vijaya | Actress | Sanam Johar | Eliminated 3rd on 14 July 2012 |
| Pratyusha Banerjee | Balika Vadhu actress | Deepak Singh | Eliminated 4th on 21 July 2012 |
| Jayati Bhatia | Sasural Simar Ka actress | Diwakar Nayal | Eliminated 5th on 28 July 2012 |
| Sushil Kumar | KBC star | Alisha Singh | Eliminated 6th on 4 August 2012 |
| Ravi Kishan | Actor and Bigg Boss star | Kunjan Jani | Eliminated 7th on 11 August 2012 |
| Gia Manek | Actress | Nishant Bhat | Eliminated 8th on 18 August 2012 |
| Shibani Dandekar | Singer | Punit Pathak | Eliminated 9th on 25 August 2012 |
| Darsheel Safary | Actor | Avneet Kaur | Eliminated 10th on 1 September 2012 |
| Karan Wahi | Actor and model | Mohena Singh | Eliminated 11th on 15 September 2012 |
| Bharti Singh | Comedian | Savio Barnes | Withdrew on 22 September 2012 |
| Isha Sharvani | Actress | Salman Yusuff Khan | Fourth place on 30 September 2012 |
| Rithvik Dhanjani | Actor and dancer | Sneha Kapoor | Third place on 30 September 2012 |
| Rashami Desai | Uttaran actress | Shampa Gopikrishna | Runners-up on 30 September 2012 |
| Gurmeet Choudhary | Actor | Shampa Gopikrishna | Winners on 30 September 2012 |

== Scoring chart ==
| | Week | | | | | | | | | | | | | | | | | | | | | | | |
| | 1 | 2 | 3 | 4 | 5 | 6 | 7 | 8 | 9 | 10 | 11 | | 12 | | 13 | | | 14 | 15 | | | 16 | | |
|---|---|---|---|---|---|---|---|---|---|---|---|---|---|---|---|---|---|---|---|---|---|---|---|---|
| Gurmeet | 23 | 22 | 26 | 30 | 30 | 30 | 30 | 29 | 27 | 20 | 23 | 21 | 27 | 26 | Evita | 30 | 25 | 22+28 | Gauahar | 21 | 28+6 | 27 | 10 | Winner |
| Rashami | NOT IN COMPETITION | | | | | | — | 30 | 27 | 29 | 30 | 27 | 24 | 28 | Brent | 24 | 30 | 30+30 | Meiyang | 24 | 27+4 | 30 | 9 | 1st runner-up |
| Rithvik | NOT IN COMPETITION | | | | | | — | 27 | 30 | 26 | 30 | 27 | 25 | 21 | Anya | 27 | 30 | 30+30 | Yana | 27 | 30+8 | 27 | 10 | 2nd runner-up |
| Isha | 27 | 30 | 30 | 30 | 30 | 30 | 30 | 30 | 29 | 24 | 26 | 30 | 30 | 30 | Jaymz | — | — | — | 0+30+10 | | — | Quit | | |
| Bharti | 27 | 24 | 27 | 21 | 30 | 24 | 26 | 23 | 27 | 24 | 19 | 19 | 21 | 27 | Sasha | 24 | 24 | 24+24 | Mahhi | | | Quit | | |
| Karan | NOT IN COMPETITION | | | | | | — | 30 | 24 | 24 | 23 | 26 | 23 | 25 | Emma | 26 | 30 | | Eliminated | | | | | |
| Darsheel | 26 | 27 | 26 | 29 | 25 | 27 | 27 | 27 | 30 | 26 | 24 | 24 | Eliminated | | | | | | | | | | | |
| Shibani | 23 | 23 | 27 | 30 | 27 | 30 | 28 | 30 | 23 | 27 | Eliminated | | | | | | | | | | | | | |
| Gia | 22 | 23 | 24 | 22 | 28 | 30 | 22 | 24 | 26 | Eliminated | | | | | | | | | | | | | | |
| Ravi | 24 | 26 | 27 | 27 | 22 | 26 | 21 | 24 | Eliminated | | | | | | | | | | | | | | | |
| Avika | NOT IN COMPETITION | | | | | | — | Not Selected | | | | | | | | | | | | | | | | |
| Jay | NOT IN COMPETITION | | | | | | — | Not Selected | | | | | | | | | | | | | | | | |
| Neha | NOT IN COMPETITION | | | | | | — | Not Selected | | | | | | | | | | | | | | | | |
| Sushil | 24 | 25 | 20 | 21 | 24 | 24 | 16 | Eliminated | | | | | | | | | | | | | | | | |
| Jayati | 25 | 27 | 25 | 28 | 20 | 19 | Eliminated | | | | | | | | | | | | | | | | | |
| Pratyusha | 24 | 22 | 24 | 24 | 19 | Eliminated | | | | | | | | | | | | | | | | | | |
| Archana | 21 | 23 | 20 | 20 | Eliminated | | | | | | | | | | | | | | | | | | | |
| Sanath | 27 | 24 | 19 | Eliminated | | | | | | | | | | | | | | | | | | | | |
| Talat | 21 | 22 | Eliminated | | | | | | | | | | | | | | | | | | | | | |
| Bottom | Archana; Talat | Pratyusha; Talat | Jayati; Sanath | Archana; Bharti; Ravi; Sushil | Pratyusha; Ravi; Sushil | Bharti; Darsheel; Jayati; Sushil | Ravi; Sushil | Bharti; Darsheel; Gia; Ravi; Shibani | Gia; Karan | Karan; Shibani | Bharti; Darsheel; Rashami | | — | | Karan; Rithvik | | | | Bharti; Rashami | | | Gurmeet; Isha; Rashami; Rithvik | | |
| Quit | None | | | | | | | | | | | | | | | | | | Bharti^{2} | | | Isha^{3} | | |
| Eliminated | No; Elimination | Talat | Sanath | Archana | Pratyusha | Jayati | Sushil | Ravi | Gia | Shibani | Darsheel | | No; Elimination | | Karan^{1} | | | | No Elimination | | | Rithvik | | |
| Eliminated | No; Elimination | Talat | Sanath | Archana | Pratyusha | Jayati | Sushil | Ravi | Gia | Shibani | Darsheel | | No; Elimination | | Karan^{1} | | | | No Elimination | | | Rashami | | Gurmeet |

green numbers indicates the highest score.
red numbers indicates the lowest score.
indicates the winning couple.
indicates the runner-up couple.
indicates the second runner-up couple
indicates the fourth-place couple
the couple eliminated that week
indicates the returning couple that finished in the bottom three.

=== Notes ===
- In Week 13, there was no elimination.
- From Week 14 onwards, those contestants in Bottom-Two would have to perform a dance-off and one would be eliminated and one saved based on Judges scoring alone.
- Week 15: In Week 14, Judges used VETO and Isha & Salman were to perform in Semi-finals directly due to injury thus that week they were not in the bottom two or bottom three.

^1 In the dance-off between Karan & Mohena and Rithvik & Sneha two of the judges Remo D'souza and Madhuri Dixit voted for Rithvik while another judge, Karan Johar, voted for Karan. Thus having the minority of votes Karan and his dancing partner and choreographer Mohena were eliminated.
^2 After being announced as one of the contestants for the bottom two with Rashmi, Bharti withdrew from the competition to protest Isha's stay on the show despite her being unable to deliver any performances for the last couple of weeks. Such a progression in the game according to her was not only unjust to other contestants but also violated the premises of fair play on which the competition should actually be based.
^3 Isha was originally announced as a finalist for the title; however, due to persistent injuries she has faced, she withdrew from the competition and Rashmi, in turn, was given a place in the Grand Finale.

== Dance chart ==
Highest scoring dance
Lowest scoring dance
Danced, but not scored

Jhalak Dikhhla Jaa (season 5) - Dance chart
| Couple | Weeks | | | | | | | | | | | | | | | | | | | | | | | |
| Couple | 1 | 2 | 3 | 4 | 5 | 6 | 7 | 8 | 9 | 10 | 11 | | 12 | | 13 | | 14 | | 15 | | | 16 | | |
|---|---|---|---|---|---|---|---|---|---|---|---|---|---|---|---|---|---|---|---|---|---|---|---|---|
| Gurmeet & Shampa | Bollywood | Bollywood | Rumba | Puli Kali | Latin Robotic | Freestyle | Indian Semi-Classical | Martial Arts | Broadway & Kathakali | Freestyle | Freestyle | Contemporary | Zouk-Lambada | Freestyle | Pasodoble | Freestyle | Hip-Hop | Contemporary | Freestyle | Tandav | Freestyle | Freestyle | Freestyle | Freestyle (Note: No scores were given for this dance.) |
| Rashami & Deepak | | | | | | | Bollywood & Freestyle | Afro Jazz Dance | Samba & Bollywood | Contemporary & Bollywood | Freestyle | Lindy Hop | Yakshagana Dance | Lyrical Hip-Hop | Cha-cha-cha | Bungee Freestyle | Bollywood | Freestyle | Freestyle | Freestyle | Freestyle | Freestyle | Freestyle | Freestyle |
| Rithvik & Sneha | | | | | | | Salsa | Hip-Hop & Salsa | Michael Jackson style & Indian Semi-Classical | Freestyle | Aerial Silk | Lyrical Hip-Hop | Floor Contemporary | Locking & Freestyle | Samba | Hip-Hop & Stomping | Freestyle | Hip-Hop | Contemporary | Freestyle | Freestyle | Freestyle | Freestyle | Freestyle |
| Isha & Salman | Rope Mallakhamb & Freestyle | Bollywood & Contemporary | Pasodoble | Freestyle (Puppet Dance) | Contemporary (Modern) | Bachata & Pole Dance | Bollywood Contemporary | Aerial Hoop | Afro & Chhau | Bollywood & Hip-Hop | Freestyle | Ballroom Dance | Argentine Tango (Street form) | Solstrom (Dance) | Hip-Hop & Contemporary | — | | | | Rope Mallakhamb | Freestyle | | | |
| Bharti & Savio | Bollywood | Bollywood | Lavani | Disco | Lyrical Contemporary | Bollywood | Bollywood & Cabaret | Bollywood & Hip-Hop | Mujra & Jive | Bollywood | Freestyle | Bhangra & Hip-Hop | Rumba | Bollywood & Afro Jazz Dance | Bollywood & Salsa | Freestyle | Cha-cha-cha & Bollywood | Bollywood | | | | | | |
| Karan & Mohena | | | | | | | Contemporary | Contemporary | Flamenco & Bollywood | Bollywood & Hip-Hop | Freestyle | Freestyle | Broadway Jazz | Contemporary | Rumba | Bollywood | | | | | | | | |
| Darsheel & Avneet | Bollywood | Disco | Samba | Afro Jazz Dance | Lyrical Hip-Hop | Jazz Funk | Freestyle | Contemporary | Aerial & Kalaripayattu | Freestyle | Indian Semi-Classical & Kathak | Contemporary | Hip-Hop | | | | | | | | | | | |
| Shibani & Puneet | Bollywood | Bollywood | Tango | Contemporary | Bollywood | Hip-Hop (theatrical) | Freestyle | Robotic | Jazz Funk & Indian Semi-Classical | Bollywood | Freestyle | | | | | | | | | | | | | |
| Gia & Nishant | Bollywood | Bollywood | Samba | Mujra & Kathak | Tollywood Dance | Aerial Freestyle | Lyrical Hip-Hop | Indian Contemporary Dance | Bali & Bharatanatyam | | | | | | | | | | | | | | | |
| Ravi & Kunjan | Bollywood & Cha-cha-cha | Freestyle | Tango | Bollywood | Freestyle | Salsa | Twist & Rock&Roll | Bhojpuri Dance | | | | | | | | | | | | | | | | |
| Ashmit & Sonia | | | | | | | Contemporary | | | | | | | | | | | | | | | | | |
| Avika & Sanam | | | | | | | Bollywood | | | | | | | | | | | | | | | | | |
| Jay & Bhawna | | | | | | | Contemporary & Bollywood | | | | | | | | | | | | | | | | | |
| Neha & Cornel | | | | | | | Freestyle & Jazz | | | | | | | | | | | | | | | | | |
| Sushil & Alisha | Freestyle | Bollywood | Salsa | Bollywood | Bollywood | Freestyle | Freestyle | | | | | | | | | | | | | | | | | |
| Jayati & Diwakar | Freestyle | Contemporary | Tandava | Odissi | Tap Dance | Salsa | | | | | | | | | | | | | | | | | | |
| Pratyusha & Deepak | Freestyle | Cha-cha-cha, Salsa & Jive | Contemporary | Freestyle | Bollywood | | | | | | | | | | | | | | | | | | | |
| Archana & Sanam | Samba | Freestyle | Foxtrot | Ballet (Classical) | | | | | | | | | | | | | | | | | | | | |
| Sanath & Suchitra | Salsa | Freestyle | Salsa | | | | | | | | | | | | | | | | | | | | | |
| Talat & Ankita | Freestyle | Freestyle | | | | | | | | | | | | | | | | | | | | | | |

== Themes ==
The celebrities and professional partners danced one of these routines for each corresponding week:

- Week 1: Introduction and premiere
- Week 2: 100 Years of Indian Cinema
- Week 3: Dance Attack
- Week 4: Zodiac Signs
- Week 5: Entertainment with Twist
- Week 6: Judges' Challenge
- Week 7: 'Superstar' Rajesh Khanna Special & Wild Card Entries
- Week 8: Best Foot Forward
- Week 9: Toofani Remix
- Week 10: Famous Jodis of Bollywood [Individual Performance & Group relay]
- Week 11: Colours & Childhood
- Week 12: Kuch Hatke Dikha & Brahmastra
- Week 13: Judges team special
- Week 14 Individual performances, performing in a group with back-dancers
- Week 15: Semi-Final - Guest dancing partners, Solo and Group Relay performances
- Week 16: Finale

The first episode of Week 7 was themed 'Wild Card' Special selected three new contestants to current participating celebrities.

| Couple | Dance Form | Dance Song |
|---|---|---|
| Rashami & Deepak | Bollywood & Freestyle | Khallas |
| Jay & Bhawna | Contemporary & Bollywood | Tum Ho Paas Mere |
| Avika & Sanam | Bollywood | Jali Toh Kasam Se |
| Rithvik & Sneha | Salsa | Aadat Se Majboor |
| Neha & Cornel | Freestyle & Jazz | Dhunki |
| Karan & Mohena | Contemporary | Ishaqzaade |
| Ashmit & Sonia | Contemporary | Dil Ibadat |

Out of the seven new Wild Card Entrance the couples which joined the current celebrities in the race of 'Jhalak' were

- Rashami & Deepak
- Rithvik & Sneha
- Karan & Mohena

Selected Dance
Rejected Dance

In Week 9, Isha's choreographer Salman sustained an injury during technical rehearsals and was thus unable to perform. Cornell, another dancing partner, performed with Isha in this episode. Cornell was the dancing partner of Neha Bhasin in the Wild Card Entry episode.

From the episode dated 2 September 2012 (Week 12) new choreographers were introduced and the celebrities and their professional partners (from Dancing with the Stars) danced one of these routines for the week 13 episode 25 (dated 8 September 2012):

Week 13(Episode 25 [8 September 2012]): Firangi Tarka

- Gurmeet with Iveta Lukosiute
- Rashami with Brent Borbon
- Rithvik with Anya Garnis
- Isha with Jaymz Tuaileva
- Bharti with Sasha Farber
- Karan with Emma Slater

Week 13 episode 26 (dated: 9 September 2012) Rithvik's choreographer Sneha could not perform since she was suffering from typhoid thus another dancing partner Marischa Fernandes (JDJ 4 Winner choreographer) was roped in to perform with Rithvik.

Week 14: Salman, Isha's choreographer, performed on a Bollywood Dance form alone as Isha could not perform due to the elbow injury sustained in Week 12. There were no scores and the voting lines for Isha-Salman were not opened either. However, as per Judges ruling, Isha shall start performing from Week 15 (Semi-Final) onwards.

Week 15 (Episode 29 dated: 22 September 2012) contestants from previous Jhalak Dikhlaa Jaa seasons were invited as guest partners to perform with the remaining contestants Gurmeet, Bharti, Rashami and Rithvik. As Isha still had not recovered, she did not perform in that episode. The performances were choreographed by the respective choreographers; however, contestants had the following guests as dancing partners:

- Gurmeet performed with Gauahar Khan
- Rashami performed with Meiyang Chang
- Rithvik performed with Yana Gupta
- Bharti was to perform with Mahhi Vij. However, she withdrew for medical reasons at the beginning of the episode.

== Highest and lowest scoring performances ==
The best and worst performances of each team according to the judges' 30-point scale are as follows:

| Dance Form (best) | Highest score | Team | Lowest score | Dance Form (worst) |
|---|---|---|---|---|
| Puli Kali; Latin Robotic; Freestyle; Indian Semi-Classical; Pasodoble | 30(5) | Gurmeet & Shampa | 20 | Freestyle |
| Afro Jazz Dance; Freestyle; Bungee Freestyle; Bollywood | 30(6) | Rashmi & Deepak | 24 | Yakshagana Dance; Cha-cha-cha |
| Michael Jackson style & Indian Semi-Classical; Aerial Silk; Hip-Hop & Stomping; Freestyle | 30(5) | Rithvik & Sneha | 21 | Locking & Freestyle |
| Bollywood; Pasodoble; Freestyle; Contemporary; Bachata & Pole Dance;Bollywood Contemporary; Aerial Hoop; Ballroom Dance; Argentine Tango; Solstrom; Rope Mallakhamb | 30(11) | Isha & Salman | 0(5) | (did not perform) |
| Lyrical Contemporary | 30 | Bharti & Savio | 19 | Freestyle; Bhangra & Hip-Hop |
| Contemporary; Bollywood | 30(2) | Karan & Mohena | 23 | Freestyle; Contemporary |
| Aerial & Kalaripayattu | 30 | Darsheel & Avneet | 25 | Lyrical Hip-Hop |
| Contemporary; Hip-Hop (theatrical); Robotic | 30(3) | Shibani & Punit | 23 | Bollywood; Jazz Funk & Indian Semi-Classical |
| Aerial Freestyle | 30 | Gia & Nishant | 22 | Bollywood; Mujra & Kathak; Lyrical Hip-Hop |
| Tango; Bollywood | 27 | Ravi & Kunjan | 21 | Twist & Rock&Roll |
| Bollywood | 25 | Sushil & Alisha | 16 | Freestyle |
| Odissi | 28 | Jayati & Diwakar | 19 | Salsa |
| Freestyle; Cha-cha-cha, Salsa & Jive | 24 | Pratyusha & Deepak | 19 | Bollywood |
| Freestyle | 23 | Archana & Sanam | 20 | Foxtrot; Ballet |
| Salsa | 27 | Sanath & Suchitra | 19 | Salsa |
| Freestyle | 22 | Talat & Ankita | 21 | Freestyle |

== Controversies ==
- TV Actress Gia Manek was replaced overnight from her show Saath Nibhaana Saathiya for participating in Jhalak Dikhhla Jaa.
- Stand-up comedian Bharti Singh who withdrew from the competition for medical reasons on 22 September revealed that the real reason behind her quitting the show was to protest Isha's stay on the dance contest. While standing against Rashmi in the bottom two, Bharti vehemently proclaimed that she sees her performances of no worth as she believes that the reality show has been rigged and Isha's continuous progression in the competition from week to week without delivering any performances is a visible proof that the contest is being plotted on unfair grounds.

== Guest appearances ==
| Guest(s) | Note(s) |
|---|---|
| Rupal Patel | To introduce her Gopi Bahu, Gia |
| Ayushmann Khurrana | To introduce Shibani & Archana |
| Sonu Sood | To introduce Isha |
| Harbhajan Singh | To introduce Sanath |
| Malaika Arora Khan | Malaika introduced & performed with Bharti Singh |
| Priyanka Chopra | To promote her film Teri Meri Kahaani and introduce Darsheel |
| Abhishek Bachchan, Ajay Devgan, Asin, Prachi Desai & Rohit Shetty | To promote their film Bol Bachchan |
| Tusshar Kapoor & Ritesh Deshmukh | To promote their film Kyaa Super Kool Hain Hum |
| Karanvir Bohra & Neeraj Shridhar | Guest Performers in the Judges Challenge Week |
| Boman Irani & Farah Khan | To promote their film Shirin Farhad Ki Toh Nikal Padi |
| Salman Khan & Katrina Kaif | To promote their film Ek Tha Tiger |
| Ranbir Kapoor, Priyanka Chopra & Ileana D'Cruz | To promote their film Barfi! |
| Kareena Kapoor | To promote her film Heroine |
| Rani Mukherjee | To promote her film Aiyyaa |
| Siddharth Malhotra, Varun Dhawan, & Alia Bhatt | To promote their film Student of the Year |
| Sridevi | To promote her film English Vinglish |

== Awards ==
| Year | Awards | Category | Winner |
|---|---|---|---|
| 2012 | Indian Television Academy Awards | Best Anchor-Music & Film-based Show | Manish Paul |
| 2012 | Colors Golden Petal Awards | Most Lokpriya Non-Fiction Anchor | Manish Paul |
| 2012 | Colors Golden Petal Awards | Best Non Fiction Judge | Madhuri Dixit Nene |
| 2012 | Colors Golden Petal Awards | Most Verstile TV Personality | Karan Johar |
| 2012 | Colors Golden Petal Awards | Most Lokpriya Dharavahik – Non Fiction | Jhalak Dikhhla Jaa 5 |
| 2012 | Colors Golden Petal Awards | Most Favourite Dancing Diva | Rashami Desai |
| 2013 | Indian Telly Awards | Best Anchor | Manish Paul |
