= Jhalak Dikhhla Jaa season 8 =

Jhalak Dikhhla Jaa
- Season 8
- Presented by: Manish Paul
- Judges: Ganesh Hegde; Lauren Gottlieb; Shahid Kapoor; Karan Johar; Malaika Arora
- No. of contestants: 16
- Celebrity winner: Faisal Khan
- Professional winner: Vaishnavi Patil
- Winning mentor: Vivek Chachere
- Runner-up: Sanaya Irani
- No. of episodes: 27

Release
- Original network: Colors TV
- Original release: 11 July – 10 October 2015

Season chronology
- ← Previous; Season 7 Next → Season 9

Jhalak Dikhhla Jaa 8 also known as Jhalak Dikhhla Jaa Reloaded is the eighth season of the dance reality show, Jhalak Dikhhla Jaa. It premiered on 11 July 2015 on Colors. The series is hosted by Manish Paul yet again. Karan Johar, Shahid Kapoor, and Ganesh Hegde and Lauren Gottlieb judged the series. Malaika Arora replaced Johar later. The finale took place on 10 October 2015 declaring Faisal Khan and Vaishnavi as the winners while popular actress Sanaya Irani and Jai was the first runners-up.

== Format ==
The couples dance each week while the judges score each performance out of ten. This time as there are four judges the scores will be up to forty.

With the judges scores and public votes added all together, judges them decide which two couples are in the bottom and will have to do a face off. One contestant gets eliminated each week.

== Production ==
Judges for Jhalak Dikhhla Jaa Series 8

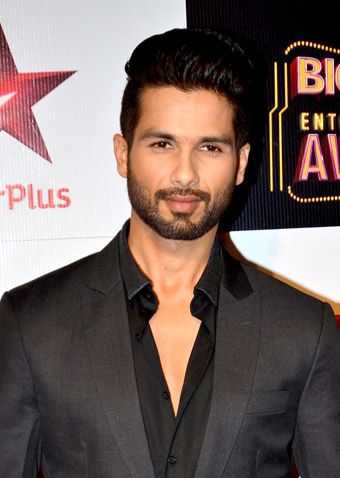
Shahid
Kapoor

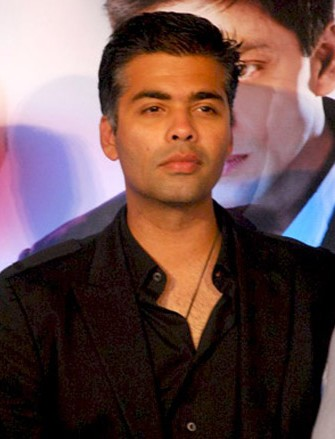
Karan
Johar

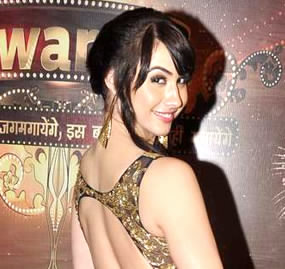
Lauren
Gottlieb

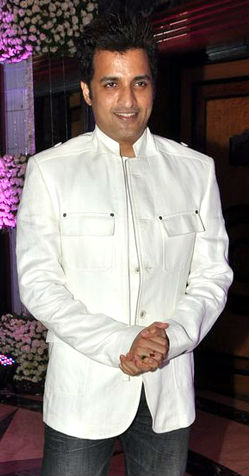
Ganesh Hegde

The series was announced to be back in April 2015. The press conference and launch was held on 3 July. Colors TV released the first promo featuring judges Karan Johar and Shahid Kapoor in June. The shooting started from 2 July where host, judges and contestants were spotted at the sets.

In April 2015, it was revealed that Manish Paul will be retained as host. In May 2015, it was announced that RJ and Bigg Boss 8 finalist, Pritam Singh was roped in to present the series replacing Ranvir Shorey. He later walked out of the series in June due to differences with the production managers.

In May 2015, it was announced that Karan Johar would not return as judge and that Farah Khan will replace him but later it was he decided to stay back. Later it was also announced that Madhuri Dixit won’t be returning as judge. In May 2015, it was revealed that Remo D'Souza has quit the show after judging the show for the last four years as he announced to judge Star Plus's dance show Dance Plus.

In June 2015, Shahid Kapoor was announced to join as a judge. Ganesh Hegde and season 6 runner-up Lauren Gottlieb were later added as the other two judges.

In September 2015, Johar announced his departure from the series as a judge as he had to shoot for his film Ae Dil Hai Mushkil.

The grand finale shooting was held on 7 October 2015 in Mumbai where judges, finalists, host and guest celebrities were spotted at the sets. Alia Bhatt and Salman Khan had attended the shoot to promote film Shaandaar and reality show Bigg Boss 9. Comedy Nights Bachao cast including Krushna Abhishek, Bharti Singh, Adaa Khan, Puja Banerjee and Karan Wahi also were at the finale shoot for more entertainment.

== Cast ==
This series features twelve celebrity contestants. In May 2015, Kavita Kaushik and Sanaya Irani were revealed as the first contestants. The full line up was revealed in June 2015.

In August 2015, cricketer Irfan Pathan and actor Vishal Karwal were roped in as wild card entries. Irfan was selected to go ahead in the competition while Vishal was straight away eliminated.

Irfan withdrew himself from the series later due to cricket commitments.

In September 2015, the series brought four new wild card entries, Anita Hassanandani, Neha Marda, Roopal Tyagi and Sukirti Kandpal. Anita, Neha and Roopal were selected to go ahead in the competition while Sukirti was straight away eliminated.

Celebrity	Notability	Professional partner	Result
Dipika Kakar	Sasural Simar Ka actress	Vaibhav Ghuge	Eliminated 1st on 25 July 2015
Kavita Kaushik	Actress	Rajiv Dev	Eliminated 2nd on 2 August 2015
Vishal Karwal	Actor and MTV Splitsvilla winner	Shampa Gopikrishna	Not Selected on 2 August 2015
Radhika Madan	Meri Aashiqui Tum Se Hi Actress	Rishikaysh Jogdande	Eliminated 3rd on 16 August 2015
Irfan Pathan	Cricketer	Suchitra Sawant	Withdrew on 21 August 2015
Ashish Chaudhary	Bollywood actor and Khatron Ke Khiladi 6 winner	Vrushali Chavan (later Falon Netto)	Eliminated 4th on 22 August 2015
Subhreet Kaur	India's Got Talent star	Diwakar Nayal	Eliminated 5th on 22 August 2015
Vivian Dsena	Madhubala – Ek Ishq Ek Junoon actor	Bhawna Khanduja	Eliminated 6th on 29 August 2015
Raftaar	Rapper	Sneha Kapoor	Eliminated 7th on 5 September 2015
Scarlett Wilson	Actress and dancer	Dhiraj Bakshi	Eliminated 8th on 12 September 2015
Sukirti Kandpal	Actress and Bigg Boss 8 star	Jack Samuel	Not Selected on 13 September 2015
Roopal Tyagi	Actress and dancer	Rishikaysh Jogdande	Eliminated 9th on 19 September 2015
Neha Marda	Balika Vadhu actress	Rajit Dev	Eliminated 10th on 26 September 2015
Anita Hassanandani	Actress	Sanam Johar	Eliminated 11th on 3 October 2015
Mohit Malik	Actor and model	Marischa Fernandes	Fourth place on 10 October 2015
Shamita Shetty	Bollywood actress and Bigg Boss 3 star	Deepak Singh	Third place on 10 October 2015
Sanaya Irani	Rangrasiya actress	Jai Kumar Nair	Runners-up on 10 October 2015
Faisal Khan	Dancer and actor	Vaishnavi Patil	Winners on 10 October 2015

== Score chart ==
	Week 1	Week 2	Week 3	Week 4	Week 5	Week 6	Week 7	Week 8	Week 9		Week 10		Week 11	Week 12			Week 13	Week 14		
Faisal	36	39	34	40	32	40	40	40	38	40	39	48	37	Akshat	39	40	—	40	10	Winner
Sanaya	32	34	32	36	40	37	30	35	36	40	39	46	36	Drashti	33	35	—	37	8	1st runner-up
Shamita	34	39	32	38	40	38	28	37	40	37	37	47	36	Sanjeeda	39	40	—	40	9	2nd runner-up
Mohit	32	31	39	35	37	38	27	40	36	34	40	40	40	Gautam	37	37	—	40	—	3rd runner-up
Anita	NOT IN COMPETITION										33	38	39	Vishal	37	35	—	Eliminated		
Neha	NOT IN COMPETITION										35	43	35	Amruta	—	Eliminated				
Roopal	NOT IN COMPETITION										30	37	—	Eliminated						
Sukirti	NOT IN COMPETITION										29	—	Not Selected							
Scarlett	34	38	34	34	39	40	30	30	40	—	36	Eliminated								
Raftaar	36	34	29	40	40	35	27	35	38	Eliminated										
Vivian	32	32	38	40	33	40	27	37	Eliminated											
Ashish	32	26	31	32	33	34	23	Eliminated												
Subhreet	39	37	39	39	36	37	26	Eliminated												
Irfan	NOT IN COMPETITION			36	39	33	—	Quit												
Radhika	37	31	34	36	35	37	Eliminated													
Vishal	NOT IN COMPETITION			32	Not Selected															
Kavita	33	36	34	36	Eliminated															
Dipika	29	36	—	Eliminated																
Bottom	None	Dipika; Kavita	Ashish; Dipika	Kavita; Raftaar	Irfan; Scarlet	Faisal; Radhika	Ashish; Irfan; Subhreet; Vivian	Raftaar; Vivian	Raftaar; Scarlett		Scarlett; Shamitta		Neha; Roopal	Anita; Neha			Anita; Mohit	Faisal; Mohit; Sanaya; Shamita		
Quit	None						Irfan	None												
Eliminated	No; Elimination	No; Elimination	Dipika	Kavita	No; Elimination	Radhika	Ashish	Vivian	Raftaar		Scarlett	Sukirti	Roopal	Neha			Anita	Mohit	Shamita	
Eliminated	No; Elimination	No; Elimination	Dipika	Vishal	No; Elimination	Radhika	Subhreet	Vivian	Raftaar		Scarlett	Sukirti	Roopal	Neha			Anita	Sanaya	Faisal	

green numbers indicates the highest score.
red numbers indicates the lowest score.
indicates the winning couple.
indicates the runner-up couple.
indicates the second runner-up couple
indicates the fourth-place couple
indicates the couple eliminated that week.
indicates the contestant was not selected.
indicates the returning couple that finished in the bottom three.
n/a indicates the couple did not get any scores

== Dance chart ==
The couples performed the following each week:

Highest scoring dance
Lowest scoring dance
Non-scoring dance

Jhalak Dikhhla Jaa (season 8) - Dance chart
Couple	Weeks																		
Couple	1	2	3	4	5	6	7	8	9		10	11		12		13		14	
Faisal & Vishnavi	Hip-hop	Rock and Roll & Lindy Pop	Freestyle	Robotics	Freestyle	Lavani	Lyrical Hip-hop	Freestyle	Kalaripayattu & Freestyle	Contemporary	Freestyle	Freestyle		Classical	Bollywood	Krumping (Note: No scores were given for this dance.)	Freestyle	Freestyle	Freestyle relay
Sanaya & Jai	Bollywood	Waltz	Freestyle	Freestyle & Afro	Bollywood	Bollywood & Mujra	Freestyle	Rock and Roll & Jazz	Freestyle	Contemporary	Freestyle	Contemporary		Freestyle	Freestyle	Lyrical Hip-hop	Freestyle	Freestyle	Freestyle relay
Shamita & Deepak	Freestyle	Freestyle	Broadway Jazz	Waltz	Cabaret & Samba	Bollywood & Tollywood	Bollywood	Freestyle	Bollywood	Afro Jazz	Contemporary	Semi Classical		Hip-hop	Latin	Bollywood	Freestyle	Freestyle	Freestyle relay
Mohit & Marischa	Afro & Krumping	Street Jazz & Freestyle	Freestye	Kalaripayattu	Freestyle	Freestyle	Hip-hop & Bhangra	Paso Doble	Freestyle	Freestyle	Freestyle	Freestyle		Bollywood	Freestyle	Hip-hop & Krumping	Freestyle	Freestyle	
Anita & Sanam											Bachata	Contemporary		Freestyle	Freestyle	— (Note: No scores were given for this dance as contestant was eliminated.)			
Neha & Rajit											Semi Classical	Afro	Freestyle	—	Freestyle				
Roopal & Rishikaysh											Bollywood	Freestyle							
Sukirti & Jack											Freestyle	—							
Scarlett & Dhiraj	Jazz	Hip-hop & Salsa	Bollywood	Paso Doble	Freestyle	Freestyle & Krumping	Contemporary	Freestyle	Bollywood	Freestyle	Urban Hip-hop								
Raftaar & Sneha	Hip-hop	Jive	Bollywood	Lyrical Hip-hop	Rhumba	Tandav	Hip-hop & Tollywood	Hip-hop	Kalaripayattu & Freestyle	Kathak									
Vivian & Bhawna	Freestyle	Robotics	Freestyle	Freestyle	Jazz	Contemporary	Freestyle & Tango	Bollywood											
Ashish & Falon	Freestyle	Bollywood	Bollywood	Freestyle	Rock and Roll	Freestyle	Freestyle & Aerial												
Subhreet & Diwakar	Freestyle	Freestyle & Bhangra	Freestyle	Freestyle	Freestyle	Freestyle	Freestyle & Waltz												
Irfan & Suchitra				Freestyle	Bollywood	Garba & Bollywood	Freestyle												
Radhika & Rishikaysh	Lyrical Contemporary	Contourtion & Hip-hop	Tango	Street Jazz	Bollywood	Bharatnatyam													
Vishal & Shampa				Contemporary															
Kavita & Rajit	Freestyle	Bollywood	Freestyle	Freestyle															
Dipika & Vaibhav	Cabaret	Freestyle	—																

== Themes ==
The celebrities and professional partners danced one of these routines for each corresponding week:

- Grand Opening Week: Introduction
- Week 1: Motion
- Week 2: Party
- Week 3: Team War
- Week 4: Dance on Favourite Superstar Song
- Week 5: Made In India
- Week 6: Andaaz Apna
- Week 7: Background Dancer
- Week 8: Costume Dhamaka
- Week 9 : Usage of Props & Wild Card Entry
- Week 10: Films Masala
- Week 11: 90's theme and Teen Ka Tadka
- Week 12: Dance with India's Got Talent contestants
- Week 13: Grand finale

=== Teen Ka Tadka guest partners ===
- Shamita & Deepak - Sanjeeda Sheikh
- Sanaya & Jai - Drashti Dhami
- Mohit & Marischa - Gautam Gulati
- Faisal & Vaishnavi - Akshat Singh
- Anita & Sanam - Vishal Singh
- Neha & Rajit - Amruta Khanvilkar
