= Tarlochan Singh Kler =

Indian cardiologist and writer

- Born: Amargarh, Punjab, India
- Occupations: Interventional cardiologist Medical writer
- Known for: Interventional cardiology
- Awards: Padma Bhushan

Tarlochan Singh Kler is an Indian interventional cardiologist, medical administrator, writer, and Chairman at Fortis Heart and Vascular Institute (Fortis Memorial Research Institute, Gurugram and Fortis Flt. Lt. Rajan Dhall Hospital) and (former Director of Cardiac Sciences at Fortis Escorts Heart Institute).

== Early life and education ==
Born in Amargarh in the Indian state of Punjab, he graduated in medicine from Punjabi University in 1976, secured his MD in general medicine from Postgraduate Institute of Medical Education and Research (PGIMER) in 1980, and followed it up with the degree of DM in cardiology from the same institution in 1983. He succeeded Naresh Trehan as the executive director of Fortis Heart Institute and Research Centre before becoming its director. He has written several articles on interventional cardiology, including "Persistent left superior vena cava opening directly into right atrium and mistaken for coronary sinus during biventricular pacemaker implantation," "Mammary coronary artery anastomosis without cardiopulmonary bypass through minithoracotomy: one year clinical experience," and "Ventricular Fibrillation in the EP Lab. What is the Atrial Rhythm?"

== Recognition ==
In 2005, he was awarded the Padma Bhushan by the Government of India for his contributions to medicine.

== See also ==
- Naresh Trehan
