= Jhalak Dikhhla Jaa season 4 =

Jhalak Dikhhla Jaa
- Season 4
- Hosted by: Sumeet Raghavan; Mona Singh
- Judges: Remo D'Souza; Madhuri Dixit; Malaika Arora
- No. of contestants: 13
- Celebrity winner: Meiyang Chang
- Professional winner: Marischa Fernandes
- No. of episodes: 24

Release
- Original network: Sony Entertainment Television
- Original release: 12 December 2010 – 8 March 2011

Season chronology
- ← Previous; Season 3 Next → Season 5

Jhalak Dikhhla Jaa 4 is the fourth season of the dance reality show, Jhalak Dikhhla Jaa. It premiered on 12 December 2010 on Sony Entertainment Television. The series was hosted by Mona Singh and Sumeet Raghavan. Meiyang Chang and Marischa Fernandes won the competition on 8 March 2011.

== The Judges ==
- Madhuri Dixit
- Remo D'souza
- Malaika Arora

== Cast ==
- Meiyang Chang and Marischa Fernandes, winners on 8 March 2011
- Sushant Singh Rajput and Shampa Gopikrishna, second place on 8 March 2011
- Yana Gupta and Salman Yusuff Khan, third place on 8 March 2011
- Mahhi Vij and Savio Barnes, fourth place on 8 March 2011
- Ankita Lokhande and Nishant Bhat, eliminated on 21 February 2011
- Ragini Khanna and Neerav Bavlecha, eliminated on 14 February 2011
- Shekhar Suman and Priti Gupta, eliminated on 7 February 2011
- Dayanand Shetty and Vrushali Chavan, eliminated on 31 January 2011
- Aashka Goradia and Deepak Singh, not-selected on 30 January 2011
- Krushna Abhishek and Robin Merchant, eliminated on 10 January 2011
- Akhil Kumar and Sneha Kapoor, eliminated on 3 January 2011
- Renuka Shahane and Jai Kumar Nair, eliminated on 27 December 2010
- Anushka Manchanda and Punit Pathak, eliminated on 20 December 2010

== Scoring chart ==
The highest score each week is indicated in bold green with a dagger (†), while the lowest score each week is indicated in italicized red with a double-dagger (‡).

Colour key:

Winners
Runners-up
Third place
Bottom two/three
Eliminated

Couple	Pl.	Week												
Couple	Pl.	1	2	3	4	5	6	7	8	9	10	11	12	13
Meiyang & Marischa	1st	18‡	23	28 (Note: This couple was in the bottom two, but was not eliminated.)	26	29+10=**39**†	30+25=**55**†	24‡	30+10=**40**†	26+26=52	27+23=50	27+30=**57**†	27+27=54	**29**† (Note: This couple finished in first place.)
Sushant & Shampa	2nd	20	**30**†	**30**†	**30**†	27+10=37	30+25=**55**†	**27**†	30+10=**40**†	30+27=**57**†	30+29=**59**†	0+0=0 (Note: This couple did not perform due to illness or injury, but was in the competition based only on public votes.)	30+28=**58**†	27‡ (Note: This couple finished in second place.)
Yana & Salman	3rd	20	29	**30**†	**30**†	21+6=27‡ (Note: This couple was eliminated.)	(Note: This couple was eliminated but performed as wild card again, and was selected.)		30+8=38	25+25=50	24+27=51	30+24=54	30+27=57	**29**† (Note: This couple finished in third place.)
Mahhi & Savio	4th	21	21	21‡	25	21+8=29	24+25=49	**27**†	28+9=37	22+21=43‡	20+21=41‡	22+27=41‡	23+24=47‡	
Ankita & Nishant	5th	21	25	26	26	25+4=29	27+20=47		27+8=35	28+24=52	26+25=51			
Ragini & Neerav	6th	19	20	**30**†	21	26+6=32	26+20=46	24‡	27+9=36	30+23=53				
Shekhar & Priti	7th	**27**†	22	22	21	23+8=31	26+25=51	24‡	8+7=15‡					
Daya & Vrushali	8th	22	20	23	22	23+4=27‡	19+20=39‡							
Krushna & Robin	9th	22	27	29	20‡									
Akhil & Sneha	10th	18‡	23	21‡										
Renuka & Jai	11th	24	19‡											
Anushka & Punit	12th	18‡												

== Weekly Summary ==
- Week 1: contestants performed on styles like Jazz, Samba and Jive. The top scorers were Shekhar and Priti who scored 27/30 and the lowest were Akhil and Sneha, Anushka and Puneet and Chang and Marischa who scored 18/30
- Week 2: The contestants performed this time on dance styles like Cha-Cha, Tango and Salsa. Sushant and Shampa received the first 30/30 for their stunning salsa. The lowest scorers were Renuka and Jai scoring 19/30. Anushka Manchanda was eliminated and hence could not perform.
- Week 3: The contestants were asked to perform on Indian folk styles. The top scorers were Sushant and Shampa, Yana and Salman and Ragini and Neerav who received 30/30 and the lowest scorers were Akhil and Sneha, and Mahi and Savio who scored 21/30. Renuka and Jai were eliminated and hence could not perform.
- Week 4: The contestants were asked to perform with another celebrity that is in a trio. The guest participants were Rashami Desai, Aishwarya Sakhuja, Jai Soni, Vidya Malvade, Vikrant Massey, Saloni Daini, Sarita Joshi and Neha Marda. The top scorers were Sushant and Shampa, and Yana and Salman both receiving a 30/30 whereas the lowest were Krishna and Robin receiving a 20/30. Akhil and Sneha were eliminated and hence could not perform.

Teen Ka Tadka

- Ragini & Neerav - Jay Soni
- Ankita & Nishant - Nandish Sandhu
- Sushant & Shampa - Rashami Desai
- Yana & Salman - Aishwarya Sakhuja
- Krushna & Robin - Sarita Joshi
- Dayanand & Vrushali - Saloni Daini
- Mahhi & Savio - Vikrant Massey
- Akhil & Sneha - Ishita Panchal
- Shekhar & Priti - Vidya Malvade
- Chang & Marischa - Neha Marda
- Week 5: The contestants were asked to perform on street dance styles like Locking and Popping, Crumping, Hip-Hop, Lyrical Hip-Hop, Stomping etc. After 4 performances each the contestants were asked to perform a group dance which would give them a chance to increase their scores making the total out of 40. The first day group dance style was Disco whereas for the second day it was Jive. Model Yana Gupta's partner Salman suffered from an injury in the leg and therefore their style was changed from Crumping to Hip-Hop. The top scores were Chang and Marischa who had received a 29/30 for their dance and they also performed a jive which made their total a 39/40. The lowest scorers were Daya and Vrushali and Yana and Salman who both received a 27/40. Krushna and Robin were eliminated and hence did not perform.
- Week 6: The Contestants were asked to give a tribute to Madhuri Dixit by performing Bollywood style on her songs. Many actors and Directors shared their thoughts with Madhuri. This week too, the contestants had to perform a group dance after all the performances of the day were over but this the total was out of 30 instead of 10 making their total out of 60. The top scorers were Chang and Marischa and Sushant and Shampa who first received a 30/30 and then received a 25/30 making their total a 55/60. The lowest scorers were Daya and Vrushali who scored a 39/60
- Week 7: The eliminated contestants had their last chance to come back in the contest and be the wild card entry. All the 6 contestants had performed and were given a rank out of six instead of a score. Akhil and Sneha ranked 6th, Renuka and Jai ranked 5th, Anushka and Puneet ranked 4th, Krushna and Robin ranked 3rd, Ankita and Nishant raked 2nd, Yana and Salman ranked 1st. The judges were only supposed to select one wild card entry, but the judges decided to put the top 2 ranked teams as wild card entries. As a result, Yana and Salman, Ankita and Nishant were selected to come in the next round.
- Week 8: This week the contestants performed on the challenge given by Malika Arora Khan. The highest scorers were Chang and Marischa with 40/40 and Sushant and Shampa with 40/40 whereas the lowest scorers, Shekhar and Priti received a 15/40, the lowest score in the history of Jhalak Dikhhla Jaa. Ragini and Neerav and Daya and Vrushali were in the bottom 2 and had to perform in a dance-off. All the three judges voted for Ragini and thus, Daya and Vrushali were eliminated.
- Week 9:The Contestants this time had to do 2 performances instead of one. The highest scorers were Sushant and Shampa with 57/60and the lowest were Mahi and Savio with 43/60. Ankita and Shekhar had to participate in the dance off. Madhuri and Remo voted for Ankita and Malaika voted for Shekhar. Shekhar and his partner Preeti were eliminated.
- Week 10:This time too, the contestants had to do 2 performances. The highest were Sushant and shampa scoring a 59/60 whereas the lowest were Mahi and Savio again with a 41/60. This time in the bottom 2 were Yana and Ragini. All three judges voted for Yana. As a result, Ragini and Neerav were eliminated.
- Week 11:Again the contestants had to do 2 performances. Sushant Singh Rajput and his partner Shampa did not perform as Sushant suffered from back injury. The top scorers were Chang and Marischa with a 57/60whereas the lowest scorers were Mahi and Savio scoring a 49/60. In the bottom two were Yana and Ankita. All three judges voted for Yana and hence Ankita was eliminated
- Week 12: This week the bottom two were Sushant and Shampa and Yana and Salman. However, the judges felt that none of them should be eliminated and used their special power to retain both contestants. The top scorers were Sushant and Shampa with a 58/60 and the lowest were Mahi and Savio with a 47/60.
- Week 13: Mahi and Savio were eliminated and therefore the top three were Sushant and Shampa, Yana and Salman and Chang and Marischa. On the Tuesday night finale the results were announced as Chang & Marischa as the winner each winning Twenty-Five Lakh Rupees. Sushant and Shampa were the runners-up. Sushant and Shampa won the Ujala Consistent Performer Award of Five Lakh Rupees.

Team	Best score	Best Dance style	Worst score	Worst dance
Sushant and Shampa	30	Salsa, Contemporary, Mayur ban Chhau, Bollywood	20	Jazz
Renuka and Jai	24	Jazz	19	Tango
Yana and Salman	30	Kalaripayattu, Contemporary	20	Rumba
Ragini and Neerav	30	Dappankuthu, Fusion	19	Jazz
Anushka and Puneet	18	Rock and Roll	18	Rock and Roll
Shekhar and Priti	27	Samba	8	Hip-Hop
Ankita and Nishant	28	Fusion	21	Lavani
Akhil and Sneha	23	Salsa	18	Samba
Daya and Vrushali	23	Bhangra, Hip-Hop	19	Bollywood
Krushna and Robin	29	Lavani	20	Afro Jazz
Mahii and Savio	28	Contemporary	20	Tango
Chang and Marischa	30	Bollywood, Freestyle, Hip Hop	18	Salsa

== Guest appearances ==
- Arti Singh
- Govinda
- Hema Malini
- Helen
- Mika Singh
- Anushka Sharma
- Ranveer Singh
- Kinshuk Mahajan
- Parul Chauhan
- Mohnish Bahl
- Lata Sabharwal
- Adhyayan Suman
- Esha Deol
- Dharmendra
- Kavita Kaushik
- Hina Khan
- Manasi Parekh
