= Jhalak Dikhhla Jaa season 7 =

Jhalak Dikhhla Jaa
- Season 7
- Presented by: Manish Paul; Drashti Dhami; Ranvir Shorey
- Judges: Remo D'Souza; Madhuri Dixit; Karan Johar
- No. of contestants: 16
- Winner: Ashish Sharma
- Runner-up: Karan Tacker
- No. of episodes: 31

Release
- Original network: Colors TV
- Original release: 7 June – 20 September 2014

Season chronology
- ← Previous; Season 6 Next → Season 8

Jhalak Dikhhla Jaa 7 is the seventh season of the dance reality show, Jhalak Dikhhla Jaa. It premiered on 7 June 2014 on Colors. The series was hosted by Ranvir Shorey and Drashti Dhami but later got replaced by Manish Paul. Madhuri Dixit, Karan Johar and Remo D'Souza were the three judges. The finale took place on 20 September 2014 and was won by Ashish Sharma and Shampa Gopikrishna.

== Format ==
The couples dance each week while the judges score each performance out of ten. This time as there are four judges the scores will be up to forty.

With the judges scores and public votes added all together, judges them decide which two couples are in the bottom and will have to do a face off. One contestant gets eliminated each week.

== Production ==
Judges for Jhalak Dikhhla Jaa Series 7

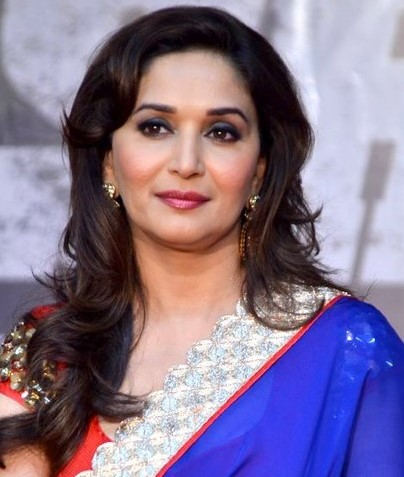
Madhuri Dixit

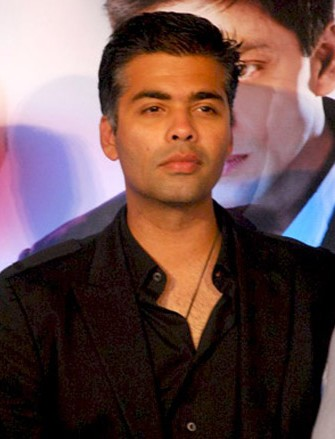
Karan Johar

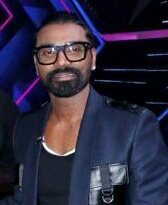
Remo D'Souza

The series was announced in February 2014. The press conference and launch was held on 2 June 2014. The shooting of the series also started from 3 June. Colors TV had released its promos in May 2014 introducing the celebrity contestants.

In May 2014, it was announced that Ranvir Shorey will be replacing Kapil Sharma as one of the presenters. Drashti Dhami also was revealed to be hosting the show alongside Ranvir. In June 2014, Dhami quit the series as a presenter weeks after the show's launch and got replaced by Manish Paul.

Madhuri Dixit, Karan Johar and Remo D'Souza returned as the judges and announced their return in March 2014.

== Cast ==
This series features thirteen celebrity contestants. In April 2014, it was announced that Purab Kohli, Karan Tacker and Andy Kumar are the first three confirmed contestants. Puja Banerjee, Mouni Roy and Shakti Mohan was later revealed as the other celebrities as well. The final line up was revealed in May.

In July 2014, seven new celebrities Sana Khan, Kushal Punjabi, Rahul Vaidya, Kainaat Arora, Akriti Kakar, Malishka Mendonsa and Tara Jean Popowich entered as wild card entries. Only three including Kushal, Malishka and Tara went ahead in the competition.

Akriti withdrew herself from the completion due to injury so could not perform as a wild card.

Celebrity	Notability	Professional partner	Result
Andy Kumar	VJ and Bigg Boss 7 star	Bhavini Mishra	Eliminated 1st on 15 June 2014
Purab Kohli	Bollywood actor	Mohena Singh	Eliminated 2nd on 22 June 2014
Kritika Kamra	Actress	Savio Barnes	Eliminated 3rd on 29 June 2014
Sukhwinder Singh	Singer	Bhawna Khanduja	Eliminated 4th on 6 July 2014
Sreesanth Nair	Cricketer	Sneha Kapoor	Eliminated 5th on 12 July 2014
Kainaat Arora	Grand Masti actress	Cornel Rodrigues	Not Selected on 13 July 2014
Rahul Vaidya	Singer	Syscilia D'Souza	Not Selected on 13 July 2014
Sana Khan	Actress & Bigg Boss 6 star	Shashank Dogra	Not Selected on 13 July 2014
Akriti Kakar	Singer	Javed Sanadi	Withdrew on 13 July 2014
Puja Banerjee	Actress	Rajit Dev	Eliminated 6th on 27 July 2014
Kushal Punjabi	Actor and model	Mohena Singh	Eliminated 7th on 2 August 2014
Malishka Mendonsa	RJ	Diwakar Nayal	Eliminated 8th on 9 August 2014
Kiku Sharda	Comedian	Kruti Mahesh	Eliminated 9th on 16 August 2014
Tara Jean Popowich	So You Think You Can Dance star and dancer	Jack Samuel	Eliminated 10th on 23 August 2014
Sophie Choudry	Actress, VJ and singer	Deepak Singh	Eliminated 11th on 30 August 2014
Akshat Singh	India's Got Talent star	Vaishnavi Patil	Eliminated 12th on 13 September 2014
Mouni Roy	Actress	Punit Pathak	Fourth place on 20 September 2014
Shakti Mohan	Dancer	Tushar Kalia	Third place on 20 September 2014
Karan Tacker	Actor and model	Elena Samodanova (later Bhawna Khanduja)	Runners-up on 20 September 2014
Ashish Sharma	Rangrasiya actor	Shampa Gopikrishna	Winners on 20 September 2014

== Scoring chart ==
Jhalak Dikhhla Jaa (season 7)- Weekly Scores
Couple	Pl.	Week																			
Couple	Pl.	1	2	3	4	5	6	7	6+7	8	9	10	11	12	13	14	13+14	15	16		
Couple	Pl.	1	2	3	4	5	6	7	6+7	8	9	10	11	12	13	14	13+14	15	Night 1	Night 2	1+2
Ashish		27	35	36	30†	26	27	25	52	24	27	25	27	27+29=56	29+30=59	27+30=57	116	—	27	9	36 (Note: This couple finished in first place.)
Karan		21	32	40†	27	30†	27	29	56	30†	27	30†	30†	27+30=57	27+27=54	28+30=58	112	—	29	10	39 (Note: This couple finished in second place.)
Shakti		29†	40†	40†	30†	30†	30†	30†	60†	30†	29	30†	30†	30+30=60	30+30=60	00+00=00	60 (Note: This couple was in the bottom two, but was not eliminated.)	—	27	8	36 (Note: This couple finished in third place.)
Mouni		27	31	30	36	22	30†	30†	60†	38	30†	27	30†	24+27=51	27+27=54	27+30=57	111	—	27 (Note: This couple finished in fourth place.)		
Akshat		28	40†	40†	30†	30†	30†	30†	60†	27	29	30†	25‡	30+30=60	27+30=57	30+30=60	117 (Note: This couple was eliminated.)				
Sophie		25	36	34	27	27	30†	30†	60†	26	30†	27	24	24+27=51							
Tara							27	30†	57	30†	30†	27	30†								
Kiku		27	27	34	27	25	21‡	21‡	42‡	26	27	24									
Malishka							23	24	47	23	26										
Kushal							25	27	52	29											
Puja		22	27	34	26	22	25	23	48												
Sreesanth		27	32	28	27	27															
Sukhwinder		18‡	26	31	21																
Kritika		22	30	29																	
Purab		24	33																		
Andy		20																			

	Week 1	Week 2	Week 3	Week 4	Week 5	Week 6	Week 7	Week 8	Week 9	Week 10	Week 11	Week 12		Week 13			Week 14		Week 15		Week 16		
Performer of the Week	None	Akshat	Mouni	Ashish	None	Sophie	None		Karan	Mouni	Shakti	Akshat		Ashish			Akshat	Mouni	None				
Ashish	27	35	36	30	26	27	25	24	27	25	27	27	29	Sana S	29	30	27	30	—N/a	—N/a	27	9	Winner
Karan	21	32	40	27	30	27	29	30	27	30	30	27	30	Krystle	27	27	28	30	—N/a	—N/a	29	10	1st runner-up
Shakti	29	40	40	30	30	30	30	30	29	30	30	30	30	Mukti	30	30	—N/a	—N/a	—N/a	—N/a	27	8	2nd runner-up
Mouni	27	31	30	36	22	40	40	38	30	37	30	24	27	Faisal	27	27	27	30	—N/a	—N/a	27	—N/a	3rd runner-up
Akshat	28	40	40	30	30	30	30	27	29	30	25	30	30	Ali	27	30	30	30	—N/a	Eliminated			
Sophie	25	36	34	27	27	30	30	26	30	27	24	24	27	Elli	—N/a	Eliminated							
Tara	NOT IN COMPETITION					27	30	30	30	27	30	27	Eliminated										
Kiku	27	27	34	27	25	21	21	26	27	24	—N/a	Eliminated											
Malishka	NOT IN COMPETITION					23	24	23	26	22	Eliminated												
Kushal	NOT IN COMPETITION					25	27	29	26	Eliminated													
Puja	22	27	34	26	22	25	23	25	Eliminated														
Akriti	NOT IN COMPETITION					—N/a	Quit																
Kainaat	NOT IN COMPETITION					—N/a	Not Selected																
Rahul	NOT IN COMPETITION					—N/a	Not Selected																
Sana K	NOT IN COMPETITION					—N/a	Not Selected																
Sreesanth	27	32	28	27	27	20	Eliminated																
Sukhwinder	18	26	31	21	22	Eliminated																	
Kritika	22	30	29	25	Eliminated																		
Purab	24	33	30	Eliminated																			
Andy	20	27	Eliminated																				
Bottom 2	None	Andy; Sophie	Puja; Purab	Kritika; Puja	Mouni; Sukhwinder	Puja; Sreesanth	None	Kushal; Puja	Kiku; Kushal	Kiku; Malishka	Kiku; Tara	Akshat; Tara		Akshat; Sohpie			None		Akshat; Shakti		Ashish; Karan; Mouni; Shakti		
Quit	None					Akriti	None																
Eliminated	No; Elimination	Andy	Purab	Kritika	Sukhwinder	Sreesanth	No; Elimination	Puja	Kushal	Malishka	Kiku	Tara		Sophie			No; Elimination		Akshat		Mouni	Shakti	
Eliminated	No; Elimination	Andy	Purab	Kritika	Sukhwinder	Sreesanth	No; Elimination	Puja	Kushal	Malishka	Kiku	Tara		Sophie			No; Elimination		Akshat		Karan	Ashish	

== Dance chart ==
The couples performed the following each week:

Highest scoring dance
Lowest scoring dance
Non-scoring dance

Jhalak Dikhhla Jaa (season 7) - Dance chart
Couple	Weeks																								
Couple	1	2	3	4	5	6		7	8	9	10	11			12		13		14			15		16	
Ashish & Shampa	Hip-hop	Samba	Bollywood, Freestyle & Thang Ta	Drunk Jazz	Freestyle	Bollywood		Stomping & Hip-hop Freestyle	Paso Doble	Semi Classical	Physical Theatre & Mime	Freestyle		Bollywood & Freestyle	Yakshaganan	Disco & Freestyle	Tango	Contemporary	Hip-hop & Krumping	Hip-hop & Freestyle	Freestyle (Note: No scores were given for this dance.)	Freestyle	Freestyle	Parkour & Freestyle	Freestyle relay
Karan & Elena	Freestyle	Cha-Cha & Hustle	Bollywood	Ballroom Freestyle	Paso Doble	Hip-hop		Bollywood	Stomping & Krumping	Bollywood & Freestyle	Freestyle	Contemporary & Freestyle		Bollywood & Freestyle	Contemporary & Freestyle	Freestyle	Hip-hop & Bhangra	Freestyle	Hip-hop & Freestyle	Jazz & Freestyle	Freestyle	Freestyle	Kalari & Chau	Paso Doble & Freestyle	Freestyle relay
Shakti & Tushar	Ballet	Tango & Mambo Tricks	Contemporary & Chau	Modern Jazz	Latin Freestyle	Contemporary		Freestyle	Classical & Classical	Bollywood & Freestyle	Lyrical Hip-hop	Lyrical		Broadway Jazz	Freestyle	Contact Improvisation	Tandav	Cabaret	—			Freestyle	Afro & Acrobacia	Contemporary & Krumping	Freestyle relay
Mouni & Punit	Freestyle	Rumba & Coban Bolero	Contorted Tandav	Freestyle	Freestyle	Freestyle		Freestyle	Classical & Robotics	Bollywood & Freestyle	Freestyle	Afro		Broadway Jazz	Paso Doble	Contemporary	Freestyle	Jazz	Semi Classical	Robotics & Bollywood	Freestyle	Freestyle	Contemporary	Indian Folk	
Akshat & Vaishnavi	Bollywood	Paso Doble	Bollywood	Freestyle	Freestyle	Freestyle		Robotics	Freestyle	Semi Classical	Contemporary & Freestyle	Semi Classical		Bollywood & Freestyle	Freestyle	Freestyle	Freestyle	Freestyle	Animation	Hip-hop & Freestyle	Freestyle	Freestyle	Freestyle (Note: No scores were given for Akshat this dance as he was originally eliminated but on public demand he was brought back for a last performance.)		
Sophie & Deepak	Freestyle	Bollywood	Bollywood, Freestyle & Paso Doble	Samba & Freestyle	Aerial & Freestyle	Freestyle		Bollywood	Jive & Freestyle	Contemporary & Freestyle	Acrobacia & Freestyle	Lyrical		Broadway Jazz	Freestyle	Hip-hop	Freestyle (Note: No scores were given for this dance as contestant was eliminated.)								
Tara & Jack						Freestyle	Contemporary	Jazz	Hip-hop & House	Hip-hop and Contemporary	Bollywood	Urban Hip-hop	Paso Doble	Bollywood & Freestyle	Contemporary & Freestyle										
Kiku & Kruti	Electro	Flamenco & Bomba	Lavani	Bollywood & Freestyle	Robotics	Freestyle		Freestyle	Hip-hop	Popping & Locking	Tandav & Krumping	Lyrical Hip-hop													
Malishka & Diwakar						Bollywood	Freestyle	Freestyle	Freestyle	Semi Classical	Samba & Freestyle														
Kushal & Mohena						Hip-hop	Freestyle	Freestyle	Afro	Street Jazz															
Puja & Rajit	Freestyle	Cha-Cha & Tofo Tofo	Tollywood	Freestyle	Semi Classical	Freestyle		Bollywood & Freestyle	Freestyle																
Kainaat & Cornel						Salsa																			
Rahul & Syscilia						Bollywood																			
Sana & Shashank						Bollywood																			
Akriti & Javed						— (Note: No scores were given for this dance as the contestant quit the series before performing.)																			
Sreesanth & Sneha	Hip-hop	Lindy Hop & Chamberlian	Bollywood & Rajasthani Folk	Hip-hop & Freestyle	Freestyle	Freestyle																			
Sukhwinder & Bhawna	Freestyle	Rumba & Contact Improvisation	Bollywood & Bhangra	Hip-hop & Freestyle	Freestyle																				
Kritika & Savio	Freestyle	Jive & Jitterbug	Bollywood & Garba	Cha Cha & Freestyle																					
Purab & Mohena	Freestyle	Salsa & Lambada	Bollywood																						
Andy & Bhavini	Contemporary	Zouk & Reggaeton																							

== Themes ==
The celebrities and professional partners danced one of these routines for each corresponding week:

- Grand Opening Week: Introduction
- Week 1 : International Judge Week
- Week 2 : Made in India
- Week 3 : Judges Demand
- Week 4 : Jhalak Talkes
- Week 5 : Wild Card Entries & Prop Week
- Week 6 : I Love
- Week 7 : DJ Mix & Indian Cinema
- Week 8 : Kurukshetra & Team Challenge
- Week 9 : Backstage Dancer week
- Week 10 : Independence Day week
- Week 11 : Dialogues
- Week 12 : Teen Ka Tadka & Public’s Demand
- Week 13 : Special Group Theme
- Week 14 : Semi Finals & Ganesh Hegde Special
- Week 15 : Super Finale

Week 5 was themed 'Prop week', and each of the participating celebrities dedicated their performances as follow.

- Puja & Rajit - Picture frame
- Ashish & Shampa - Stretchy Jacket
- Karan & Elena - Bucket
- Mouni & Punit - Golden Shoes
- Kiku & Kruti - Glass
- Akshat & Vaishanavi - Glasses
- Shakti & Tushar - Stretchy Material
- Sophie & Deepak - Sticks
- Malishka & Diwakar - Square Box
- Kushal & Mohena - Heart
- Tara & Jack - Feather

1st Episode of Week 5 themed 'Wild Card' Special selected 4 new contestant to current participating celebrities.

- Note - Singer Akriti Kakkar had to quit the show as she was to enter the wild card race due to an accident.

Couple	Dance Form	Dance Song
Tara & Jack	Contemporary	Gulaabi
Sana & Shashank	Bollywood	Radha
Rahul & Syscilia	Bollywood	Chingam Chabake
Kushal & Mohena	Freestyle	Thug Le
Kainaat & Cornel	Freestyle	Darling
Malishka & Diwakar	Freestyle	Dhinka Chika

Out of the 6 new Wild Card Entrance the couples which joined the current celebrities in the race of 'Jhalak' were

- Malishka & Diwakar
- Kushal & Mohena
- Tara & Jack

Selected Dance
Rejected Dance

Week 8 themed 'Kurukshetra is where the judges chooses their teams within the participants and the one with more scores wins.

Category	Remo's Team	Karan's Team	Madhuri's Team
Remaining Participants	Kushal & Mohena, Tara & Jack, Kiku & Kruti	Karan & Elena, Shakti & Tushar, Mouni & Punit	Akshat & Vaishnavi, Ashish & Shampa, Malishka & Diwakar

Weak 10 themed 'Team Challenge' had two performances from the participants, where one was a team performance. Team leader was selected from the previous week's highest scorers. Team participants, dancing style and songs were finalised by these leaders.

Category	Akshat's Team	Mouni's Team
Team Leader	Akshat & Vaishnavi	Mouni & Punit
Remaining Participants	Tara & Jack, Ashish & Shampa, Karan & Bhavna	Shakti & Tushar, Sophie & Deepak, Kiku & Kruti
Dance Form	Bollywood & Freestyle	Broadway Jazz
Dance Song	Dil Toh Baccha Hai Ji, All Is Well	Do You Wanna Partner & Chammak Challo
Marks	29	30

- Mouni's team won the team challenge with getting 30 marks.

Green numbers indicates the highest score.

Week 13 was themed 'Teen Ka Tadka' special episode wherein every contestant will get a new celebrity contestant to dance with. Sana and Tushar who were paired with Mumaith Khan could not perform in the episode since they got eliminated in that week.

- Ashish & Shampa with Sana Saeed
- Shakti & Tushar with Mukti Mohan
- Karan & Bhavna with Krystle D'Souza
- Mouni & Punit with Faisal Khan
- Sophie & Deepak with Elli Avram
- Akshat & Vaishnavi with Ali Asgar

== Guest appearances ==
Week(s)	Episode(s)	Guest(s)	Note(s)
1	Ep01	Krystle D'Souza, Sidharth Shukla, Toral Rasputra, Mrunal Jain, Tina Datta & Sanaya Irani	To support the contestants
1	Ep01	Varun Dhawan & Alia Bhatt	To promote Humpty Sharma Ki Dulhania
1	Ep01	Sudesh Lehri	Guest
1	Ep02	Akshay Kumar & Sonakshi Sinha	To promote Holiday: A Soldier Is Never Off Duty
2	Ep03	Sunny Leone	To promote MTV Splitsvilla
2	Ep03	Saif Ali Khan, Ritesh Deshmukh & Sajid Khan	To promote Humshakals
2	Ep04	Salman Yusuff Khan & Lauren Gottlieb	Guest
2	Ep04	Siddharth Malhotra, Shraddha Kapoor & Prachi Desai	To promote Ek Villain
3	Ep05	Shakti Arora & Radhika Madan	To promote their show Meri Aashiqui Tum Se Hi
3	Ep06	Ali Asgar & Upasana Singh	From Comedy Nights with Kapil to support Palak
4	Ep07	Preetika Rao & Harshad Arora	From Beintehaa as guest
4	Ep07	Armaan Jain, Deeksha Seth	To promote Lekar Hum Deewana Dil
4	Ep08	Dipika Kakar & Toral Rasputra	Came as guest from Sasural Simar Ka, Balika Vadhu
5	Ep09	Vidya Balan	To promote Bobby Jasoos
7	Ep12	Salman Khan & Jacqueline Fernandez	To promote Kick
8	Ep15-16	Rani Mukerji	To promote Mardaani
8	Ep15-16	Sachin–Jigar	Guest
9	Ep17	Akshay Kumar	To promote Entertainment
9	Ep18	Kareena Kapoor Khan	To promote Singham Returns
10	Ep20	Sasha Tacker and Archana Taide	To support Karan Tacker and Ashish Sharma
11	Ep21	Emraan Hashmi, Humaima Malik	To promote Raja Natwarlal
11	Ep22	Gurmeet Choudhary & Lauren Gottlieb	Guest Appearance
11	Ep22	Sunil Grover	From Comedy Nights with Kapil
12	Ep23	Priyanka Chopra	To promote Mary Kom
12	Ep24	Shahid Kapoor & Shraddha Kapoor	To promote Haider
13	Ep25	Elli Avram, Faisal Khan, Krystle D'Souza, Ali Asgar, Sana Saeed & Mukti Mohan	For Teen Ka Tadka week
13	Ep26	Aditya Roy Kapoor & Parineeti Chopra	To promote Daawat-e-Ishq
14	Ep27	Fawad Khan & Sonam Kapoor	To promote Khoobsurat
15	Ep29-30	Arjun Kapoor & Deepika Padukone	To promote Finding Fanny
15	Ep29-30	Ganesh Hegde	Guest Judge
16	Ep31	Anil Kapoor & Bharti Singh	Guest in Finale
16	Ep31	Shaan & Mika Singh	To promote their film Balwinder Singh Famous Ho Gaya
16	Ep31	Neeti Mohan & Mukti Mohan	To support Shakti Mohan
16	Ep31	Salman Yusuff Khan & Lauren Gottlieb	Special Performance
