= Subhreet Kaur Ghumman =

Indian dancer

- Born: 22 April 1986 (age 40); Jhundhan Village, Sangrur, Punjab
- Height: 5 ft 8 in (173 cm)
- Spouse: Robert Ballinghoff

Subhreet Kaur Ghumman (born 22 April 1986) is a one-legged dancer who participated in India's Got Talent and qualified for the second level. Her nickname is 'Shubh'. She lost her leg in an accident.

== Early life ==
Kaur, popularly known as "One Legged Dancer", is resident of Jhundan village, Amargarh, Sangrur District in Punjab. Kaur lost her left leg above the knee in a road accident on 21 October 2009, while riding her scooter.

She saw Vinod Thakur dancing on television and decided to start dancing on one leg. Shubh started practicing daily. She continued her passion for dance and she lived according to her life's motto, "Never give up..... Nothing is impossible,". Her mother Smt. Charanjeet Kaur is her role model.

== Dance career ==
Shubh got selected in India's Got Talent TV show for her dance performance.

Her performance received a standing ovation from the judges. Salman Khan admired her on Twitter "Wah Yaar. Hats Off. Kamaal Hai." In 2015, she became a contestant on Jhalak Dikhhla Jaa (season 8) and was impressed by the judges. She was eliminated in week 6.
