= Longinus Fernandes =

Indian choreographer and dancer

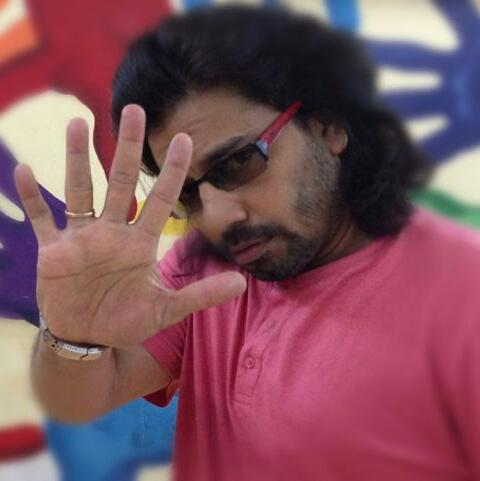
- Born: 20 October; Bangalore, India
- Other names: Longi and Longie
- Occupation: choreographer
- Years active: 1995–present
- Awards: 2009: Best Choreography: Jaane Tu Ya Jaane Na – Pappu Can't Dance Saala
- Website: www.longinusworld.com

Longinus Fernandes (Longie) is an Indian choreographer and dancer, who won the Filmfare Best Choreography Award in 2009; and internationally he is most known as the choreographer of the closing credits dance sequence featuring Academy Award for Best Original Song winning song, Jai Ho and another featuring O... Saya, also nominated in the same category, in the film Slumdog Millionaire (2008).

At the 81st Academy Awards ceremony, director Danny Boyle thanked him in his acceptance speech, while receiving his award for Best Direction, and also apologized for missing out his name in the credits.

== Career ==
Longinus started out as a dancer in Hindi cinema in the early 1990s, which paved way for work as assistant choreographer, soon he graduated to choreographing independently with film, Dil Ka Doctor (1995). Though he came into limelight when he took part in the reality dance competition, Jhalak Dikhhla Jaa (Season 1), on Sony TV in 2006, where he partnered with actress, Shweta Salve and the couple were adjudged the runners-up, thereafter in 2008 he appeared as a judge in another reality dance competition, between television actors, Saas v/s Bahu, on Sahara One channel. He has also choreographed music videos like, Baba Sehgal's Balle Balle Ho Gai and Adnan Sami's Lift Kara De.

In 2008, he choreographed two songs in the film Slumdog Millionaire, O... Saya and Jai Ho, which were shot at Lion's Gate, Essel World and the CST station in Mumbai, with scores of dancers.

In February 2009, he also started work on Bollywood Hero, a three-part international miniseries'.

Longinus was also awarded the prestigious "Fred Astaire Award" (2009) in New York for best film choreography (Slumdog Millionaire).

He was also the choreographer for the opening of So You Think You Can Dance-Canada (for three consecutive years 2009, 2010 & 2011).

== Filmography ==
- Dil Ka Doctor (1995)
- Oh Darling! Yeh Hai India (1995) (Actor)
- Border (1997)
- Keemat: They Are Back (1998)
- Bombay Boys (1998)
- Jai Hind (1999)
- Pyaar Mein Kabhi Kabhi (1999)
- Sarfarosh (1999)
- Dil Hi Dil Main (2000)
- Moksha (2001)
- Deewaanapan (2001)
- Satta (2003)
- Kucch To Hai (2003)
- Kyon? (2003)
- Dil Vil Pyar Vyar (2002)
- Dil Hai Tumhaara (2002)
- Khushi (2003)
- Fun2shh (2003)
- Rok Sako To Rok Lo (2004)
- Des Hoyaa Pardes (2004)
- Agni Pankh (2004)
- Sajna Ve Sajna (2005)
- Page 3 (2005)
- Corporate (2006)
- Mera Dil Leke Dekho (2006)
- Saawariya (2007)
- Jaane Tu Ya Jaane Na (2008)
- Slumdog Millionaire (2008)
- Nickelodeon's Bollywood Bob (2009)
- Radio (2009)
- Jail (2009)
- Bollywood Hero-American TV Series (2009)
- So You Think You Can Dance (CANADA) (2009)
- So You Think You Can Dance (CANADA) (2010)
- So You Think You Can Dance (CANADA) (2011)
- Guzaarish (2010)
- Cigarette ki Tarah (2012)
- My Friend Pinto (2011)
- Pappu Can't Dance Saala (2011)
- Shirin Farhad Ki Toh Nikal Padi (2012)
- Barfi (2012)
- Kyaa Super Kool Hain Hum (2012)
- Ghost (2012)
- Closing Ceremony International Film Festival Of India (2013)
- Jayantabhai Ki Luv Story (2013)
- Saheb, Biwi Aur Gangster Returns (2013)
- Listen Amaya (2013)
- Ishkq in Paris (2013)
- Will To Live (2014)
- Sense 8-American TV Series (2014)
- Yaariyan (2014)
- The Second Best Exotic Marigold Hotel (2015)
- Hawaizaada (2015)
- Calendar Girls (2015)
- Bakei Ki Crazy Baarat (2015)
- 36th Asian Racing Conference, Mumbai (2016)
- International Fleet Review (VIZAG) Honourable PRIME MINISTER As The Chief Guest (2016)
- Superbabies Nestle Musical Film (2016)
- Baar Baar Dekho (2016)
- Shivaay (2016)
- Indu Sarkar (2017)
- Patel Ki Punjabi Shaadi (2017)
- S.P.Chauhan (2019)
- Bombairiya (2019)
- Hume Tumse Pyaar Kitna (2019)

== Awards ==
- 2009: Filmfare Best Choreography Award: Jaane Tu Ya Jaane Na – Pappu Can't Dance Saala
- 2009: Fred Astaire Award Best Film Choreography: Slumdog Millionaire – Jai Ho
- 2009: Best Choreography Guild Award Nominee - Jaane Tu Ya Jaane Na
- 2010: Star Screen Award Nominee: Guzaarish
- 2015: Fred Astaire Award Nominee Best Film Choreography - The second best exotic Marigold hotel
- 2019: Genius Choreographer of the Year 2019 - Genius Indian Achiever's Award by Genius Foundation & World Records of India
