= Lauren Gottlieb =

American dancer and actress (born 1988)

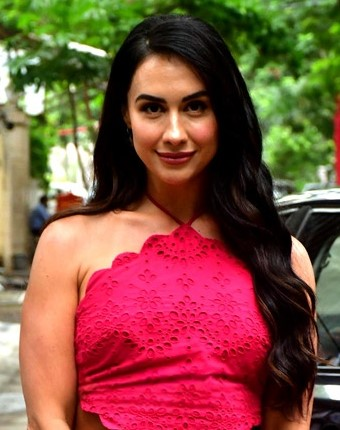
- Gottlieb in 2025
- Born: June 8, 1988 (age 38); Scottsdale, Arizona, United States
- Occupations: Actress; dancer
- Years active: 2005–present
- Spouse: Tobias Jones (m. 2025)
- Relatives: Gottmik (cousin)

Lauren Gottlieb (born June 8, 1988) is an American dancer and actress who works primarily in the Indian film industry. She was a contestant on the third season of the reality dance competition So You Think You Can Dance and played the lead role in the 2013 Indian dance film ABCD: Any Body Can Dance. She was a runner up in the sixth season of popular Indian television dance show Jhalak Dikhhla Jaa with choreographer and partner Punit Pathak in 2013. Two years later, she also judged the eighth season of the show. She has also Appeared In The Music Video Of Harrdy Sandhu "She Dance Like".

== Dance career ==
Gottlieb assisted choreographer Tyce Diorio during the second season of So You Think You Can Dance in 2006. In 2007, Gottlieb participated in season three of So You Think You Can Dance (2007) as a contestant. She made it to the semi-finals but was sent home. Once the season was over, Gottlieb assisted Tyce Diorio, Tabitha and Napoleon D'umo, and Mia Michaels during seasons four, five, and six. She also traveled on the season five audition tour as the choreographer for the "choreography round" of auditions. She returned as an "All-Star" dancer for seasons seven (2010), eight (2011), and nine (2012).

Between seasons on the show, Gottlieb performed with artists such as Rihanna, Mariah Carey, Britney Spears, Shakira, Sean Kingston, Carrie Underwood, Willow Smith, and Enrique Iglesias. She even worked with Tom Cruise, Katie Holmes, and Tobey Maguire. She appeared as a dancer in the television show Glee (2009) and in the movies Disaster Movie (2008), Hannah Montana: The Movie (2009), and Bring It On: Fight to the Finish (2009).

Gottlieb appeared in India's version of Dancing With the Stars called Jhalak Dikhla Jaa (Season 6, 2013) and was the runner-up with choreo-partner Punit Pathak.

== Acting career ==
Gottlieb's first shot at acting was on the television show Ghost Whisperer (2005). After Ghost Whisperer, she guest starred in Make It or Break It (2009), CSI: Crime Scene Investigation, and Alvin and the Chipmunks: Chipwrecked (2011). Gottlieb played the lead female role in the Indian 3D dance film ABCD: Any Body Can Dance (2013), directed by Remo D'Souza. Prior to filming, Gottlieb moved to India in March 2012 and spent three months learning Hindi and Bollywood dance techniques. The film was shot in Mumbai where she played the role of dancer Rhea, a student of Vishnu (Prabhudheva). It featured Kay Kay Menon, and Ganesh Acharya as well as dancers Salman Yusuff Khan, Dharmesh Yelande and Punit Pathak from the television show Dance India Dance. Gottlieb played the Pakistani agent Shazia Ansari in the black comedy Welcome 2 Karachi (2015).

== Personal life ==
She tied the knot with her long-time partner Tobias Jones on 11 June 2025.

== Filmography ==
=== Films ===
| Year | Film | Role | Notes |
|---|---|---|---|
| 2008 | Disaster Movie | Dancer | |
| 2009 | Hannah Montana: The Movie | Dancer | |
| 2009 | Bring It On: Fight to the Finish | Dancer | |
| 2011 | Alvin and the Chipmunks: Chipwrecked | Club Woman #2 | |
| 2013 | ABCD: Any Body Can Dance | Rhea | Hindi, Bollywood debut |
| 2015 | Detective Byomkesh Bakshy! | Herself | Hindi, Special appearance in song "Calcutta Kiss"; Also choreographer for song "Bach Ke Bakshy" |
| 2015 | Welcome 2 Karachi | Shazia Ansari | Hindi, Voiced by Priya Raina; Also as belly dancer in item song "Shakira" |
| 2015 | ABCD 2 | Olive | Hindi |
| 2015 | Welcome Back | Herself | Hindi, Special appearance in song "20 20" |
| 2016 | Ambarsariya | Manpreet Kaur | Punjabi debut |
| 2018 | Scavenger | Dancer | Short film |
| 2020 | Ghoomketu | Herself | Hindi, Special appearance |
| 2022 | Twisted Blues | Hunter | |
| 2025 | Single Salma | Zoya | |

=== Television ===
| Year | Television | Role | Notes |
|---|---|---|---|
| 2005 | So You Think You Can Dance 3 | Contestant | |
| 2005 | Ghost Whisperer | Julia | |
| 2009–2010 | Glee | Dancer | |
| 2010 | CSI: Crime Scene Investigation | Suzanne | Episode: "Wild Life" |
| 2010 | Make It or Break It | Jayden | Episode: "I Won't Dance, Don't Ask Me" |
| 2013 | Jhalak Dikhla Jaa 6 | Contestant | Runner-up |
| 2013 | Bigg Boss 7 | Herself | Guest appearance |
| 2014 | Comedy Nights with Kapil | Herself | Guest appearance |
| 2014 | Jhalak Dikhhla Jaa 7 | Herself | Guest appearance |
| 2015 | Comedy Classes | Herself | Guest appearance |
| 2015 | Jhalak Dikhhla Jaa 8 | Herself | Judge |
| 2016 | Comedy Nights Live | Herself | Guest appearance |

=== Music videos ===
| Year | Title | Co-star | Singer(s) | Director | Label |
|---|---|---|---|---|---|
| 2017 | Million Dollar | Fazilpuria | Fazilpuria | Baljinder S Mahant | Zee Music Company |
| 2017 | Mercy | Badshah | Badshah | Ben Peters | Sony Music India |
| 2019 | Dance Like | Harrdy Sandhu | Harrdy Sandhu | Keoni Marcelo | Sony Music India |
| 2020 | Kamariya Hila Rahi Hai | Pawan Singh | Pawan Singh, Payal Dev | Mudassar Khan | Jjust Music |
| 2024 | OYE HOYE | Dharmesh Yelande | Ayy Jay | Vijay Kumar Arora | Music Monkey Entertainment |
| 2025 | Sajri | Gurdeep Mehndi | Gurdeep Mehndi | Garry Villkhu | Saregama India |
