= Bollywood Hero =

American television miniseries

- Directed by: Bill Bennett
- Starring: Chris Kattan; Julian Sands; Pooja Kumar; Neha Dhupia; Toby Huss
- Country of origin: United States
- No. of seasons: 1
- No. of episodes: 3

Production
- Running time: Approx. 1 hour

Original release
- Network: IFC
- Release: August 6 – August 8, 2009

Bollywood Hero is an American musical comedy television miniseries that aired on the IFC in three parts on August 6–8, 2009. The miniseries were shot in Mumbai and Los Angeles.

The show is a musical miniseries about Chris Kattan and his journey to Mumbai to become a leading man in Bollywood. After having some successful runs as a comedian in America, Kattan wishes for more and soon discovers that making it in Bollywood is just as hard and he has to start from scratch.

Dance numbers are choreographed by Longinus Fernandes who is known for the "Jai Ho" finale in Slumdog Millionaire.

== Characters ==
=== Major characters ===
Name	Actor	Role
Chris Kattan	Chris Kattan	American comedian training to become a Bollywood leading man.
Priya Kapoor	Pooja Kumar	Producer and sister to Monty. Inherited her Dad's production company in India.
Lalima Lakhani	Neha Dhupia	Popular Bollywood starlet.
Monty Kapoor	Ali Fazal	Director and brother to Priya. Inherited his fathers's production company in India.
Reg Hunt	Julian Sands	Aging English actor who once dreamed of being the first Anglo Bollywood superstar.
Jeff Hacker	Toby Huss	Chris's agent in Los Angeles.
Kunti Kumar	Rashaana Shah	Former Bollywood starlet who is eventually rediscovered.
Beeji	Ruma Sengupta	Grandmother to Priya and Monty.
Kip King	Kip King	Chris's Father.
Executive	Olivier Lafont	A film executive in Monty's path.

==== Cameos ====
- Gaurav Ghatnekar as Hipster Partygoer
- Maya Rudolph as herself
- Keanu Reeves as himself
- David Alan Grier as himself
- Longinus Fernandes as himself

== International Broadcasting ==
- Brazil: +Globosat
