= Jhalak Dikhhla Jaa season 3 =

Jhalak Dikhhla Jaa
- Season 3
- Hosted by: Shiv Panditt; Shweta Tiwari
- Judges: Saroj Khan; Juhi Chawla; Vaibhavi Merchant
- No. of contestants: 12
- Celebrity winner: Bhaichung Bhutia
- Professional winner: Sonia Jaffer
- Runner-up: Gauahar Khan
- No. of episodes: 24

Release
- Original network: Sony Entertainment Television
- Original release: 27 February – 31 May 2009

Series chronology
- ← Previous; Season 2 Next → Season 4

Jhalak Dikhhla Jaa 3 is the third season of the dance reality show, Jhalak Dikhhla Jaa. It premiered on 27 February 2009 on Sony Entertainment Television. The season was hosted by Shweta Tiwari, Shiv Panditt and Rohit Roy. The series was won by Baichung Bhutia and Sonia Zaffer on 31 May 2009 winning ₹40,00,000.

== Cast ==
=== Couples ===
Celebrity	Notability	Professional partner	Status	Ref
Bhaichung Bhutia	Footballer	Sonia Jaffer	Winners	
Gauahar Khan	Model	Himanshu Gadani (earlier Hanif Hilal)	Eliminated 6th	
Gauahar Khan	Model	Himanshu Gadani (earlier Hanif Hilal)	Runners-up	
Karan Singh Grover	Actor	Nicole Alvares	Third place	
Hard Kaur	Rapper	Savio Barnes	Eliminated 10th	
Parul Chauhan	Actress	Deepak Singh	Eliminated 9th	
Shilpa Shukla	Actress	Nishant Bhat	Eliminated 8th	
Monica Bedi	Actress	Javed Sanadi	Eliminated 7th	
Ram Kapoor	Actor	Marischa Fernandes	Eliminated 5th	
Mohinder Amarnath	Cricketer	Lillian Mendes	Eliminated 4th	
Anand Raaj Anand	Music composer & Singer	Rozita Rajput	Eliminated 3rd	
Ugesh Sarcar	Magician	Tina Sachdeva	Eliminated 2nd	
Bhagyashree	Actress	Toby Fernandez	Eliminated 1st	

== Scoring chart ==
The highest score each week is indicated in bold green with a dagger (†), while the lowest score each week is indicated in italicized red with a double-dagger (‡).

Colour key:

Winners
Runners-up
Third place
Bottom two
Eliminated

Jhalak Dikhhla Jaa (season 3)- Nightly Scores
Couple	Pl.	Night																	
Couple	Pl.	1	2	3	1+3	4	2+4	5	6	7	8	9	10	11	12	13	14 (Note: The couples were scored on a 40-point scale due to the presence of a guest judge.)	15	14+15
Bhaichung & Sonia	1st	—N/a	22	—N/a	—N/a	23	45	22	**30**†	27	**30**†	—N/a	**30**†	25	25‡	29+27=**56**†	37+40+36=**113**†	25‡	138 (Note: This couple finished in first place.)
Gauahar & Himanshu	2nd	24	—N/a	24	48	—N/a	—N/a	27	26	23 (Note: This couple was in the bottom two, but was not eliminated.)	26 (Note: This couple was eliminated.)	**30**† (Note: This couple was eliminated but performed as wild card again, and was selected.)	26	**28**†	28	22+24=46	37+40+36=**113**†	**30**†	**143**† (Note: This couple finished in second place.)
Karan & Nicole	3rd	—N/a	19‡	—N/a	—N/a	**29**†	48	25	26	19	27	—N/a	27	22	29	25+18=43‡	33+36+29=98‡	25‡	123‡ (Note: This couple finished in third place.)
Hard & Savio	4th	**27**†	—N/a	27	**54**†	—N/a	—N/a	24	26	28	28	—N/a	**30**†	29	**30**†	26+27=53			
Parul & Deepak	5th	20‡	—N/a	22	42	—N/a	—N/a	22	29	29	19‡	—N/a	28	24	26				
Shilpa & Nishant	6th	23	—N/a	18‡	41‡	—N/a	—N/a	**30**†	20‡	27	28	—N/a	24	20‡					
Monica & Javed	7th	24	—N/a	22	46	—N/a	—N/a	20‡	**30**†	22	**30**†	—N/a	23‡						
Ram & Marischa	8th	—N/a	20	—N/a	—N/a	26	46	22	26	16‡		27 (Note: This couple was eliminated but performed as wild card again, but was not selected.)							
Mohinder & Lilian	9th	—N/a	**25**†	—N/a	—N/a	23	48	23	23			20							
Anand & Rozita	10th	—N/a	23	—N/a	—N/a	21‡	44‡	21				28							
Ugesh & Tina	11th	—N/a	**25**†	—N/a	—N/a	25	**50**†					19‡							
Bhagyashree & Toby	12th	20‡	—N/a	24	44							24							
