= Alisha Singh =

Indian actress, dancer and choreographer

- Born: 5 May 1991 (age 35); Ranchi, Jharkhand, India
- Education: Ranchi Women's College
- Occupations: Actress, dancer, choreographer
- Years active: 2003– present
- Known for: Boogie Woogie; Dance India Dance; Dil Dosti Dance;Jhalak Dikhhla Jaa
- Father: Raj Kumar Singh

Alisha Singh is an Indian television actress, dancer and choreographer. She was the winner of the reality show Boogie Woogie four times and a runner up in Dance India Dance Season 1. She is also known for the television shows Dil Dosti Dance and Jhalak Dikhhla Jaa. She also assisted in the choreography of several dance numbers in films like Dhoom 3, Bajrangi Bhaijaan and Kung Fu Yoga.

== Filmography ==
Television

Year	Television Show	Role	Notes	Channel
2003	Boogie Woogie	Contestant	Runner up	Sony Entertainment Television
2007	Boogie Woogie	Contestant	Won the title of "Boogie Woogie Ustaadon Ke Ustaad Championship"	Sony Entertainment Television
2009	Dance India Dance (season 1)	Contestant	Runner up	Zee TV
2011	Dil Dosti Dance	Neha Kapoor		Channel V India
2014	Dare 2 Dance	Celebrity contestant		Life OK
2015	Crime Patrol Dial 100	Reality Show Contestant Role - Nazia	Jashn - Episode 59	Sony TV
2016	Jhalak Dikhhla Jaa	Choreographer		Colors TV
2020	Fukrapanti		Director	

== See also ==
- List of dancers
