= Khatron Ke Khiladi 6 =

Indian reality television series

Fear Factor: Khatron Ke Khiladi
- Season 6
- Title screen
- Presented by: Rohit Shetty
- No. of contestants: 16
- Winner: Aashish Chaudhary
- Runner-up: Meiyang Chang
- No. of episodes: 20

Release
- Original network: Colors TV
- Original release: 7 February – 12 April 2015

Season chronology
- ← Previous; Season 5 Next → Season 7

Fear Factor: Khatron Ke Khiladi Darr Ka Blockbuster Returns is the sixth season of Indian stunt/action based reality show Fear Factor: Khatron Ke Khiladi. The season aired from 7 February 2015 to 12 April 2015.Rohit Shetty was the host of the season. It was won by Aashish Chaudhary while Meiyang Chang was the runner-up.

== Contestants ==
This contestants participated in this season.

Contestant	Occupation	Status	Place	Ref.
Ashish Chaudhary	Actor	Winner	1	
Meiyang Chang	Singer, Actor, former Dentist	Runner-up	2	
Iqbal Khan	Actor	Eliminated	3	
Sagarika Ghatge	Actress	Eliminated	4	
Hussain Kuwajerwala	Actor	Eliminated	5	
Asha Negi	Actress	Eliminated	6	
Rakesh Kumar	Kabaddi player	Eliminated	7	
Nandish Sandhu	Actor	Eliminated	8	
Rashami Desai	Actress	Eliminated	9	
Rashami Desai	Actress	Eliminated	9	
Sana Khan	Actress, dancer	Eliminated	10	
Sana Khan	Actress, dancer	Eliminated	10	
Nathalia Kaur	Actress	Eliminated	11	
Ridhi Dogra	Actress	Eliminated	12	
Archana Vijaya	Actress	Eliminated	13	
Sidharth Bhardwaj	Actor, Model & VJ	Eliminated	14	
Harshad Arora	Actor	Eliminated	15	

Indicates original entrants
Indicates the wild card entrants
Indicates re-entered entrants

== Elimination chart ==
Contestant	Weeks																														
Contestant	1		2		3		4			5			6			7					8				9				10		
Contestant	Grand Premiere		Horor week		Totally Filmy Week		Aamna Samna			Sona Mana Hai			Twist week			Jodi Special					Ticket to Finale				Semi Finale				Grand Finale		
Contestant	7–8 February		14–15 February		21–22 February		28 February - 1 March			7–8 March			14–15 March			21–22 March					28–29 March				4–5 April				11-12 April		
Ashish	WIN		WIN		WIN		LOST	SAFE		WIN			WIN			HUSSAIN	2	3	SAFE(5pts.)		LOST	N/A	N/A		2	5	SAFE(5pts.)		TOP4	TOP2	WINNER
Chang	WIN		BTM5	SAFE	WIN		LOST	SAFE		WIN			LOST	SAFE		NATHALIA	2	0	BTM4(2pts.)	SAFE	WIN	WIN	WIN	TOF	TICKET TO FINALE				TOP4	TOP2	RUNNER-UP
Iqbal	BTM5	SAFE	WIN		WIN		LOST	BTM3	SAFE	LOST	SAFE		LOST	BTM4	SAFE	SAGARIKA	0	0	BTM4(0pts.)	SAFE	LOST	N/A	N/A		0	0	BTM3(0pts.)	SAFE	TOP4	LOST	ELIMINATED
Sagarika	WIN		BTM5	SAFE	BTM5	SAFE	WIN			LOST	SAFE		WIN			IQBAL	0	0	BTM4(0pts.)	SAFE	WIN	WIN	LOST		0	3	SAFE(3pts.)		TOP4	LOST	ELIMINATED
Hussain	WIN		WIN		BTM5	SAFE	WIN			WIN			WIN			AASHISH	2	3	SAFE(5pts.)		LOST	N/A	N/A		2	5	SAFE(7pts.)		LOST	ELIMINATED	
Asha	WIN		WIN		WIN		LOST	SAFE		LOST	BTM4	SAFE	LOST	BTM4	SAFE	RAKESH	2	5	SAFE(7pts.)		WIN	LOST	N/A		0	5	SAFE(5pts.)		LOST	ELIMINATED	
Rakesh	WIN		BTM5	SAFE	BTM5	SAFE	WIN			LOST	SAFE		WIN			ASHA	2	5	SAFE(7pts.)		WIN	LOST	N/A		0	3	SAFE(3pts.)		LOST	ELIMINATED	
Nandish	WILD CARD ENTRY						WIN			LOST	SAFE		WIN			RASHMI	0	3	SAFE(3pts.)		WIN	LOST	N/A		2	3	SAFE(5pts.)		LOST	ELIMINATED	
Rashami	WIN		WIN		WIN		LOST	BTM3	SAFE	LOST	BTM4	ELIMINATED	WIN			NANDISH	0	3	SAFE(3pts.)		WIN	WIN	LOST		0	0	BTM3(0pts.)	ELIMINATED			
Sana	BTM5	ELIMINATED	WIN		BTM5	SAFE	LOST	SAFE		LOST	BTM4	SAFE	LOST	SAFE		SALMAN	0	5	SAFE(5pts.)		LOST	N/A	N/A		2	0	BTM3(2pts.)	ELIMINATED			
Salman	NOT IN COMPETITION [GUEST]													GUEST		SANA	0	5	SAFE(5pts.)		DURATION COMPLETED										
Nathalia	WIN		BTM5	SAFE	WIN		WIN			LOST	SAFE		LOST	BTM4	SAFE	MEIYANG	2	0	BTM4(2pts.)	ELIMINATED											
Ridhi	BTM5	SAFE	WIN		WIN		WIN			LOST	BTM4	SAFE	LOST	BTM4	ELIMINATED																
Archana	WIN		WIN		WIN		LOST	BTM3	ELIMINATED																						
Sidharth	BTM5	SAFE	WIN		BTM5	ELIMINATED																									
Harshad	BTM5	SAFE	BTM5	ELIMINATED																											

The contestant win the first stunt and safe from getting fear funda or get winning or second winning point.
The contestant get into the elimination round.
The contestant was safe from elimination.
The contestant has done wild card entry and was not available in the week.
The contestant was eliminated.
The contestant lost the first stunt and was in pre-elimination round.
The contestant safe from getting into an elimination round.
Guest
Partner in week 7
Point
The contestant was in top position.
The contestant failed to get in top position.DE5D83
The contestant win ticket to finale.
The contestant fail to win ticket to finale.
The contestant came for only following duration.
The contestant was winner of the show.
The contestant was runner-up of the show.

== Advantage Hat ==
In week 7 Aashish Chaudhary was given an advantage hat as he had never gone in elimination round. The advantage was that he will automatically be safe in the elimination round. This advantage was only for week 7.
