= Robin Merchant =

Canadian choreographer

- Born: White Rock, British Columbia, Canada
- Occupation(s): Choreographer, Master Instructor, Dancer
- Years active: 1998–present
- Height: 5 ft 2 in (157 cm)
- Website: RobinMerchant.com

Robin Merchant is an internationally recognized choreographer and dance instructor. Notably, she has danced for Grammy winning artists including the Black Eyed Peas, and MIA. She has choreographed China's international dance festival, MTV, Stunt Mania, and Dancing with the Stars (India - Jhalak Dikhhla Jaa).

== Career ==
Robin began working as a dancer, dancing on stage for several Grammy winning artists, and in movies such as Disney's, The Cheetah Girls One World choreographed by Fatima Robinson.

Robin began her leadership career as a master instructor at internationally recognized dance studios such as: Broadway Dance Center (NY), Pineapple Dance Studios (London) and the National Ballet of Canada. From these specialized roots, she traveled and debuted in India, bringing a high caliber of expertise and form to a market that was traditionally under represented in western styles. Robin's strong knowledge of dance quickly led her to become India's most sought after instructor in jazz, contemporary, and urban dance styles and allowed her to pioneer jazz funk within the country. Production houses and corporations such as Sony, Lay's, and Reebok began vying for Robin's choreography for their Indian TV commercials. Given the extraordinary demand that India generates for new art forms, Robin also established a dance institute in Mumbai. It specialized in western technique, and those that trained at her studio became some of the most sought after dancers in the country. Bollywood cinema took notice and Robin was commissioned to choreograph dance songs within hit films such as "Game (2011 film)" and reality TV shows such as Dancing with the Stars (India). Now as a seasoned artist, Robin travels frequently bringing her unique perspective of multimedia, dance and technique to the rest of the world.

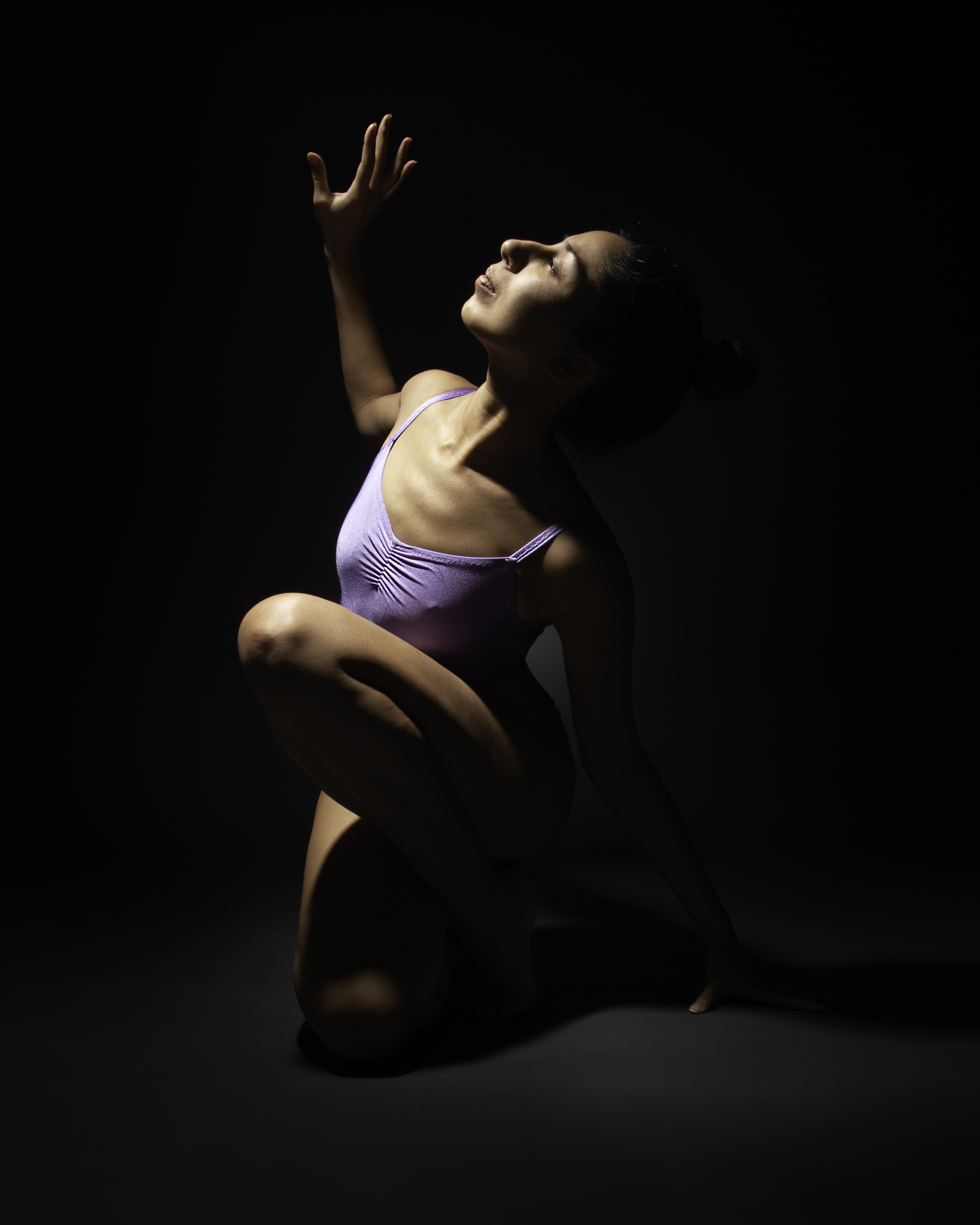
Robin Merchant Choreographer
