= Amargarh =

- Village
- Interactive map of Amargarh
- Country: India
- State: Uttar Pradesh
- District: Bulandshahr

Government
  - Type: Sarpanch (Pradhan)
  - Body: Gram panchayat

Amargarh is a village in Bulandshahr District, Uttar Pradesh state of India. 202398 is pin code of this village.
