= Meiyang Chang =

Indian actor, television host and singer (born 1982)

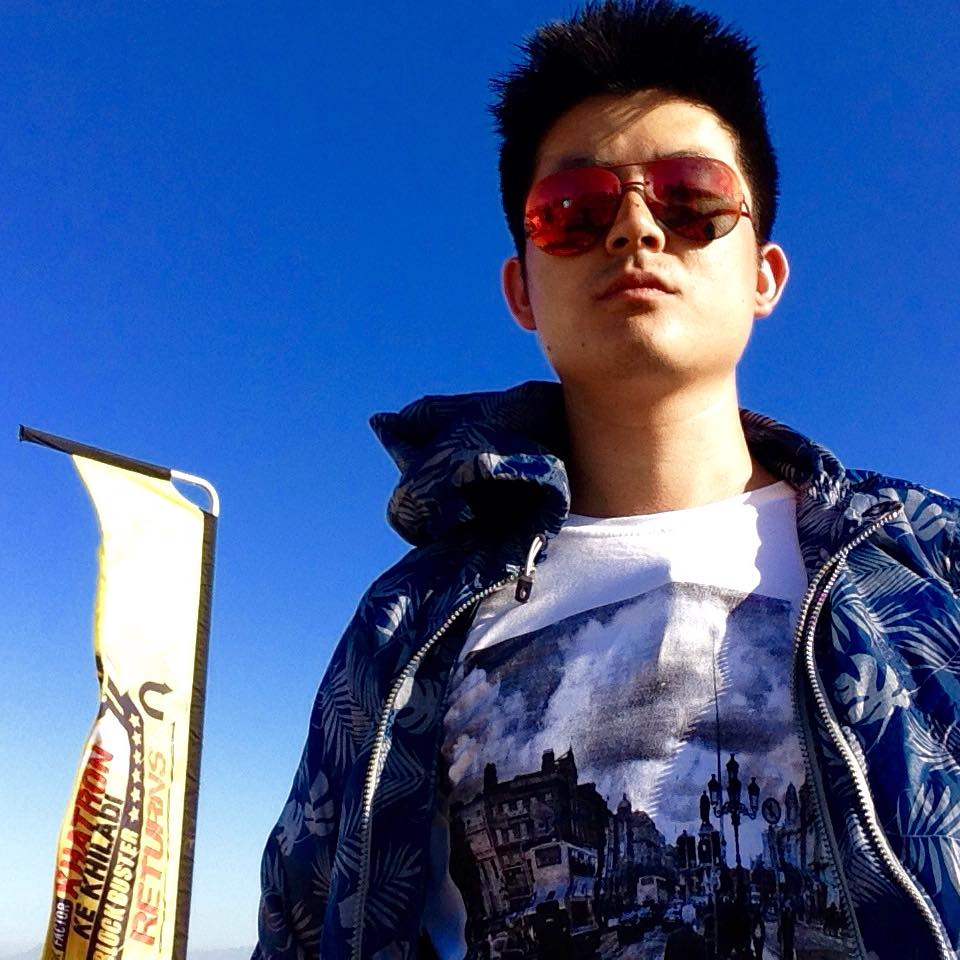
- Meiyang Chаng
- Born: 6 October 1982 (age 44); Dhanbad, Bihar (now Jharkhand), India
- Occupations: Actor; television presenter; singer
- Years active: 2007–present

Chinese name
- Simplified Chinese: 张眉阳
- Traditional Chinese: 張眉陽
- Hanyu Pinyin: Zhāng Méiyáng

Meiyang Chang (born 6 October 1982) is an Indian actor, television host, singer and a dentist. He came to prominence as a contestant on the third season of the singing reality show Indian Idol in which he was among the top five finalists. After Indian Idol, he was part of short-lived boy band called F4 with his fellow contestants from the show Parleen Singh Gill, Suhit Gosain, and Abhishek Kumar.

He began his acting career with the YRF film Badmaash Company. He has starred in the films, Detective Byomkesh Bakshy, Sultan and Bharat. He was initially set to debut with a film called The Seventeens, produced by Pritish Nandy Communications and directed by Arindam Mitra, but it was shelved after the recession of 2008. His band F4 had done playback for the film.

He is known for his participation in the dance reality show Jhalak Dikhhla Jaa 4 in which he was the winner. He also participated in the stunt based reality show Fear Factor: Khatron Ke Khiladi 6, in which he became the 1st runner-up. His latest work includes the web series Asur, Undekhi and Modern Love Mumbai. In 2024, he had a brief role in the thriller Ulajh.

== Early and personal life ==
Meiyang is a third generation Indian-Chinese, with roots in China's Hubei province. His father is a dentist and his mother is a beautician. His family is Buddhist, but follows Hindu rituals as well.

Chang is an alumnus of De Nobili School, CMRI (Dhanbad), Colonel Brown Cambridge School, Dehradun and Wynberg Allen School, Mussoorie. He is also a qualified dentist with a BDS degree from Vokkaligara Sangha Dental College & Hospital, Bangalore. He had finished his degree in 2005, and by 2006 was practising in Bangalore. Before auditioning for Indian Idol, he was planning to go to the US for higher studies.

During the days of Indian Idol 3, he met Monali Thakur and started dating her, and they were in a relationship for 3 years.

== Filmography ==
=== Web series ===
| Year | Project | Role |
|---|---|---|
| 2015 | Man's World | Sohail |
| 2017 | Untag | Nischay Baruah |
| 2018-19 | Love, Lust & Confusion | Yudi Liu |
| 2019 | Bombers | Tokai |
| 2021 | 1962 - The War in the Hills | Major Lin |
| 2021 | Hiccups & Hookups | Rinzing |
| 2022 | Undekhi | Abhay |
| 2022 | Modern Love Mumbai | Ming |
| 2023 | Asur | Paul |
| 2023 | Maya Bazaar For Sale | Sudeem Gogoi |
| 2024 | Karate Girls | JD |
| 2025 | First Copy | Sanjay Gogoi |
| 2026 | Space Gen: Chandrayaan | Rohan Tamang |
| 2026 | Taarkata | Dodo |

=== Film ===
| Year | Project | Role | Notes |
|---|---|---|---|
| 2010 | Badmaash Company | Zing | |
| 2015 | Detective Byomkesh Bakshy! | Kanai Dao | |
| 2016 | Sultan | Himself | |
| 2019 | Bharat | Jimmy | |
| 2024 | Ulajh | Jacob Tamang | |
| 2025 | Sweet Dreams | Ishant | |
| 2026 | Happy Patel: Khatarnak Jasoos | Himself | Cameo appearance |

=== Television ===
| Year | Title | Role | Notes |
|---|---|---|---|
| 2007 | Indian Idol 3 | Contestant | 5th place |
| 2008 | Indian Idol 4 | Host | |
| 2009 | IPL 2 | Host | |
| 2010-11 | Jhalak Dikhhla Jaa 4 | Contestant | Winner |
| 2011 | India's Got Talent 3 | Host | |
| 2014 | Yeh Hai Aashiqui | Jigme | Episode 32 |
| 2015 | Fear Factor: Khatron Ke Khiladi 6 | Contestant | Runner-up |
| 2015 | I Can Do That | Contestant | |
| 2016 | Swiss Made Adventure | Host | |
| 2017 | Rising Star | Host | |
| 2017 | India's Best Jobs | Host | |
| 2018 | Love Me India | Host | |
| 2019 | Epic IQ Challenge | Host | |
| 2020 | Lost Essence of India | Host | |
| 2021 | Mind Wars- India's Inter School Quiz Competition | Host (Episode 13-21) | |
| 2025 | Chhoriyan Chali Gaon | Guest Judge | |

=== Voice acting ===
| Original Year Release | Title | Actor(s) | Character(s) | Dubbed Language | Original Language |
|---|---|---|---|---|---|
| 2018 | Ant-Man and the Wasp | Randall Park | Jimmy Woo | Hindi | English |
| 2024 | Mufasa: The Lion King | Kelvin Harrison Jr. | Taka/Scar | Hindi | English |

=== Music ===
| Year | Title | Co-singer | Composer | Lyricist | Label |
|---|---|---|---|---|---|
| 2008 | "Tu To Na Ayi" Album | F4 | Lesle Lewis, Amit Trivedi, Ajay Singha | Uncredited | Sony Music India |
| 2013 | "Kuch Dino Se" | - | Ajay Singha | Pinky Poonawala | Sony Music India |
| 2013 | "Hanju" | Neha Kakkar | Tony Kakkar | Tony Kakkar | Times Music |
| 2015 | "Kya Yahi Pyaar Hai" | Shashaa Tirupati | Cover | - | Strumm Sound |
| 2016 | "Saara Zamana" | - | Cover | - | Strumm Sound |
| 2016 | "Ek Ladki Bheegi Bhaagi Si" | DJ Aqeel | Cover | - | Saregama |
| 2017 | "Tukka Laga" “Jagga Jasoos” | - | Pritam | Samrat | T series |
| 2017 | "Hum Tumhe Chahtey Hain" | - | Cover | - | Times Music |
| 2018 | "Ye Haseen Wadiyan" | Himani Kapoor | Cover | - | Meiyang Chang |
| 2018 | "Rafta Rafta" | Himani Kapoor | Cover | - | Meiyang Chang |
| 2018 | "Khamosh Raat" | - | Cover | - | Meiyang Chang |
| 2018 | "Maula" | - | Bawa Sahni | Haider Zulqarnain | Drishyam Play |
| 2018 | "Pehli Baar Mohabbat" | - | Cover | - | Meiyang Chang |
| 2018 | "Aektaa Story" | - | Original | Victor Mukherjee | Love Lust & Confusion S1: Viu |
| 2019 | "Dil Ko Sambhalo" | - | Lesle Lewis | Uncredited | Love Lust & Confusion S2: Viu |
| 2019 | "Bol Na Halke Halke" | Himani Kapoor | Cover | - | Meiyang Chang |
| 2019 | "Sunta Hai Mera Khuda" | Himani Kapoor | Cover | - | Meiyang Chang |
| 2021 | "Safarnama" | - | Rimi Dhar | Saaveri Verma | Merchant Records |
| 2022 | "Raat Bhar" “Modern Love Mumbai” | - | Vishal Bhardwaj | Vishal Bhardwaj | Amazon Prime Music |
| 2022 | "Jaayaz Hai” | Amrita Saluja (poetry) | Cover | - | Meiyang Chang |
| 2023 | "Jhoothi Chai” | | Manan Bhardwaj | Manan Bhardwaj | Namyoho Studios |
| 2024 | "Bhalobashar Morshum” | | Cover | - | Meiyang Chang |
| 2024 | "Mitra” | Prakruti Mishra | Dharam Bhatt | Mani Soni | Amazon Music |
| 2024 | "Teri Meri Purani Yaadein” | | Dharam Bhatt | Raj Sagar | Amazon Music |
| 2024 | "Aadhe Aadhe” | | Udayan Dharmadhikari | Shayra Apoorva | Sa Re Ga Ma |
