= Sneha Kapoor =

Indian dancer and choreographer

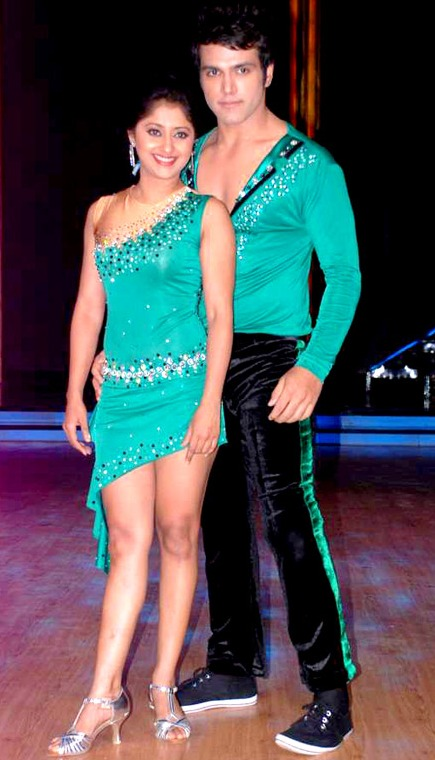
- Rithvik Dhanjani on the sets of Jhalak Dikhla Jaa Season 5 with his partner Sneha Kapoor.
- Born: 18 April 1986 (age 40); Bangalore, Karnataka, India
- Other name: The Indian Salsa Princess
- Occupations: Dancer; choreographer; dance instructor
- Years active: 2006–present

Sneha Kapoor is an Indian salsa dancer, choreographer, and instructor. She is popularly known as "The Indian Salsa Princess". Kapoor is based in Mumbai, she began her career with a dance company in Bangalore. It was the beginning of a career that embraced different dance forms like Salsa, Bachata, Merengue, Jive, hip-hop, Adagio and Bollywood. She was invited to Jabalpur on 25 May 2015 as a chief guest to watch the show of great dancing children.

== Career ==
Popularly known as "The Indian Salsa Princess" or "SalsaSneha", Sneha Kapoor is widely credited with putting the Indian Salsa scene on the world map. Kapoor is the first Indian to represent India and win at many International Salsa Championships. Living in Mumbai, she began her career in dance with Lourd Vijay's Dance Studio in 2006. It was the beginning of a meteoric career that embraced different dance forms like Salsa, Bachata, Merengue, Jive, Hip-Hop, Adagio and Bollywood etc.

Kapoor originally was an athlete, but because of some causes after she met Richard Tholoor she decided to become a dancer instead, joining Lourd Vijay's dance studio in Bangalore. During her tenure at the school, Kapoor and her dance partner Tholoor won several awards and trophies in salsa championships across the world.

Kapoor broke a Guinness World Record for "Most Number of Swing Dance Flips in a Minute". The record of 33 flips in a minute was set four years ago in the UK, but Kapoor and her team of three dancers set the new record at 39 flips.

She participated in Dance India Dance Season 3 and was eliminated on 22 January 2012.

Kapoor has choreographed for the reality shows Just Dance and Perfect Bride. She also choreographed the South Indian movie, Jugaari and Madhur Bhandarkar's film, Heroine. She performs and teaches dance workshops nationally and internationally.

== Personal life ==
Kapoor was born to Sunil Kapoor and Elizabeth Kapoor. She has a sibling, Neha Kapoor.

== Awards ==
- Choreographer of the Movie Yaaram 2019
- 2019 1st Runner's Up on DID Battle of the Champions Zee TV
- 2007, Winner of the Australian Salsa Classic, Sydney
- 2007, Winner of the European Salsa Masters, UK
- 2007, 1st Runner Up at the Asian Open Salsa Championships, Hong Kong
- 2007, Semi-finalist at the ESPN World Salsa Championships, Orlando Florida
- Dance India Dance Season 3 Top 20 Finalist
- Winner of the Australian Salsa Classic 2007, Sydney.
- Winner of the European Salsa Masters 2007, UK.
- 1st Runner Up at the Asian Open Salsa Championships 2007, Hong Kong.
- Semi Finalist at the ESPN World Salsa Championships 2007, Orlando Florida.
- Winner of the Bangalore Central Dance Competition 2006 & 2007, Bangalore.
- Jhalak Dikhala Jaa, Season 7 – Choreographer to Sreesanth (Cricketer)
- Nach Baliye Season 6, 2013 – Choreographer to Kanika Maheshwari and Ankur Ghai.
- Jhalak Dikhhla Jaa (season 4), 2010 – Choreographer to Akhil Kumar.
- Jhalak Dikhhla Jaa (season 6), 2013 – Top 3 Performed with Shantanu Mukherjee.
- Jhalak Dikhhla Jaa (season 6), 2013 – Top 6 Choreographer to Karanvir Bohra.
- Jhalak Dikhhla Jaa (season 5), 2012 – Top 3 Choreographer to Rithvik Dhanjani.
- Jhalak Dikhhla Jaa (season 8), 2015 – choreographer to Raftaar.
- Dance India Dance Season 3, 2011 – Top 15 contestants.
- Guinness World Records Holder 2011, Most number of swing flips in a minute.
- India's Got Talent Season 1, 2009 – Finalist.
- Super Dancer season 1 choreographer, 2016
- Nach Baliye season 8, 2017 – choreographer to Aashka Goradia and Brent Goble with her boyfriend Ruel Dausan Varidani
