= Rangrasiya =

Indian television drama series

- Genre: Drama; Action; Romance
- Written by: Usha Dixit; Saurabh Tewari; Gautam Hegde; Shivani Shah; Rahil Qazi; Raghuveer Shekhavat
- Story by: Saurabh Tewari
- Directed by: Sidharth Sengupta
- Starring: See below
- Country of origin: India
- Original language: Hindi
- No. of seasons: 1
- No. of episodes: 188

Production
- Producers: Saurabh Tewari, Sumeet Chaudhry
- Production locations: Andheri, Mumbai
- Production company: Parin Multimedia Pvt Ltd

Original release
- Network: Colors TV
- Release: 31 December 2013 – 18 September 2014

Rangrasiya (transl. The One Who Colours Me) is an Indian television drama series that aired on Colors TV from 2 January 2013 to 13 September 2014. It starred Ashish Sharma as Major Rudra Pratap Ranawat and Sanaya Irani as Parvati.

== Plot ==
Parvati, affectionately known as Paro, has pure hatred towards Bharat Suraksha Dal, aka BSD officers, holding them responsible for the death of her parents. She was brought up by Thakurain Mala, and has consistent nightmares about her parents' deaths. The corrupt Raja Tejawat arranges Paro's wedding with Varun who plans to smuggle weapons across the border during the wedding procession. The procession is disrupted by BSD officers led by Deputy Commandant Rudra Pratap Ranawat and Varun is killed.

An oblivious Parvati blames Rudra for her husband's death. Rudra suspects that she is a material witness and hopes that she will testify. To prevent this, Tejawat hires goons to murder her. Rudra relocates her to his paternal home but when his malicious aunt Mohini insults Parvati's virtue, Rudra's father covers for them and announces she is Rudra's fiance. Eventually, Parvati emotionally sympathizes with Rudra after learning that his mother eloped with another man, unaware that his mother is the Thakurain. On the day of her wedding to Rudra, Parvati chooses to trust Tejawat and flees with him only to discover the truth behind her marriage to Varun. Upon realizing her mistake, she also becomes aware of her love for Rudra and returns to him.

Parvati tries her best to win over Rudra but in vain. He is accused of domestic violence and loses his job after which in a drunken state, he marries Paro. Rudra is reinstated and initially rejects Paro for betraying him but recognizes that he loves her. The couple go through: Rudra recovering from paralysis of his right arm, the interruptions of his ex-girlfriend, Laila and their mutual hesitation to confess their love for each other. They eventually unite and confess their feelings.

Thakurain Mala and Rudra meet again but Rudra has pure hatred towards her. Paro tries hard to unite mother and son and is eventually successful. Touched by his efforts to forgive his mother for her, Paro and Rudra finally consummate their marriage. The family is happy till Rudra receives an anonymous call saying that Paro will be killed. For safety, the family relocates. Varun's younger brother, Shanthanu Kumar enters their house as a bodyguard seeking revenge. Parvati finds out and Rudra comes in time to save her. Shanthanu gets arrested. Later, Parvati becomes pregnant and gives birth to a boy that the couple name Dhruv. Their happiness ends abruptly, when Shanthanu escapes from prison and murders Parvati, who dies in Rudra's arms. Shantanu is killed by Rudra.

=== 7 Years Later ===
Rudra lives with his now seven-year-old son, Dhruv and his family. Having quit the BSD, his new assignment is being the bodyguard of Myrah Mehra. Myrah, who is identical in appearance to Parvati, is an NRI and has arrived from the US to pick a venue for her wedding to Rohit Sehgal. Rudra tries to keep his distance from her, in the process becoming hostile. While she is in Rudra's house, Myrah unknowingly falls in love with Rudra and they become friendly. When he rescues her from kidnappers, he recalls how he failed to save Parvati. Under the influence of pain medication, Myrah kisses Rudra, who reciprocates, thinking she is Paro, but catches himself just in time.

While Myrah starts to accept her feelings for Rudra, he expresses his frustration over her resemblance to his late wife, Parvati. Heartbroken, she decides to leave Rudra's life, but her fiancé arrives, inspiring jealousy in Rudra. After Myrah helps Maithlee and Samrat adopt a baby, Rudra develops a liking for her. Rudra refuses to confess that he loves Myrah, but has a conversation with Paro in a dream where she tells him to move on and be happy. She assures him that she has sent Myrah for him and Dhruv. In a drunken state, Rudra confesses his love to Myrah. She is confused about her feelings for him and chooses to marry Rohit. Rudra writes a letter in which he apologizes for being unable to attend her wedding, because he cannot bear the loss. Myrah sends a video that explains her love for Rudra to Rohit, who asks Myrah to pursue it. The show ends with Rudra and Myrah confessing their love, and the whole family celebrating.

== Cast ==
=== Main ===
- Ashish Sharma as Major Rudra Pratap Ranawat: Idealistic Border Security Force Officer; Dilsher and Mala's son; Danveer's nephew; Samrat, Sumer and Sunehri's cousin; Parvati's second husband; Myrah's love interest; Dhruv's father
- Sanaya Irani in dual roles as
  - Parvati "Paro" Pratap Ranawat (née Chauhan): Mala's foster daughter; Varun's ex-wife; Rudra's wife; Dilsher and Mala's daughter-in-law; Dhruv's mother
  - Myrah Mehra: Parvati's look-alike; Rudra's love interest
- Rishi Sonecha / Kapish Chawla as Dhruv Pratap Ranawat: Rudra and Parvati's son; Samrat, Sumer and Sunehri's nephew; Dilsher and Mala's grandson

=== Recurring ===
- Prashant Chawla as Samrat Pratap Ranawat: Mohini and Danveer's elder son; Sumer and Sunehri's brother; Rudra's cousin; Maithili's husband.
- Geetanjali Mishra as Maithili Ranawat: Samrat's wife.
- Kali Prasad Mukherjee as Dilsher Pratap Ranawat: Danveer's brother; Mala's husband; Rudra's father; Dhruv's grandfather
- Sadiya Siddiqui as Mala Ranawat: Dilsher's wife; Rudra's mother; Parvati's foster mother; Dhruv's grandmother
- Sanjiv Jotangia as Danveer Pratap Ranawat: Dilsher's brother; Mohini's husband; Samrat, Sumer and Sunehri's father
- Ananya Khare as Mohini Ranawat: Danveer's wife; Samrat, Sumer and Sunehri's mother
- Udit Shukla as Samay "Sumer" Pratap Ranawat: Mohini and Danveer's younger son; Samrat and Sunehri's brother; Rudra's cousin; Shatabdi's husband
- Manasvi Vyas as Shatabdi Ranawat: Sumer's wife
- Khushbu Thakkar as Sunehri Ranawat: Mohini and Danveer's daughter; Samrat and Sumer's sister; Rudra's cousin
- Tarun Khanna as Tagor Param Singh Tejawat: Corrupt smuggler
- Vishal Gandhi as Varun Agnihotri: Shantanu's brother; Parvati's ex-husband
- Padam Bhola as Aman Deep Singh: Rudra's fellow officer at Border Security Defense
- Syed Zafar Ali as General Vaman Kumar "VK" Singh: Rudra's superior officer at the Border Security Defense
- Neha Narang as Bindiya "Bindi" Parekh: Parvati's friend
- Vishal Karwal as Shantanu Kumar Agnihotri: Varun's brother; Parvati's murderer
- Ankita Mayank Sharma as Kajal "Laila" Suri: Dancer; Rudra's former companion
- Gurpreet Singh as Rohit Sehgal: Myrah's ex-fiancé
- Pearl V Puri as Samir

=== Guest ===
- Toral Rasputra as Anandi from "Balika Vadhu"
- Sidharth Shukla as Shiv from "Balika Vadhu"
- Shashank Vyas as Jagdish from "Balika Vadhu"
- Sargun Mehta as Ganga from "Balika Vadhu"
- Anup Soni as Bhairon from "Balika Vadhu"
- Smita Bansal as Sumitra from "Balika Vadhu"
- Harshad Arora as Zain Abdullah from "Beintehaa"
- Preetika Rao as Aaliya Zain Abdullah from "Beintehaa"
- Mrunal Jain as Akash from "Uttaran"
- Tina Datta as Meethi from "Uttaran"
- Dheeraj Dhoopar as Prem from "Sasural Simar Ka"
- Dipika Kakar as Simar from "Sasural Simar Ka"
- Manish Raisinghan as Siddhant from "Sasural Simar Ka"
- Avika Gor as Roli from "Sasural Simar Ka"
- Falaq Naaz as Jhanvi from "Sasural Simar Ka"
- Shakti Arora as Ranveer from "Meri Aashiqui Tum Se Hi"
- Radhika Madan as Ishani from "Meri Aashiqui Tum Se Hi"
- Shabir Ahluwalia as Abhi from "Kumkum Bhagya"
- Sriti Jha as Pragya from "Kumkum Bhagya"
- Karan Veer Mehra as Naren from "Pavitra Rishta"
- Ankita Lokhande as Ankita from "Pavitra Rishta"
- Karanvir Bohra as Aahil from "Qubool Hai"
- Surbhi Jyoti as Sanam from "Qubool Hai"
- Piyush Sahdev as Kabir from "Sapne Suhane Ladakpan Ke"
- Mahima Makwana as Rachna from "Sapne Suhane Ladakpan Ke"
- Ankit Gera as Mayank from "Sapne Suhane Ladakpan Ke"
- Roopal Tyagi as Gunjan from "Sapne Suhane Ladakpan Ke"
- Emraan Hashmi from "Raja Natwarlal"
- Sidharth Malhotra from "Ek Villain"
- Shraddha Kapoor from "Ek Villain"
- Riteish Deshmukh from "Ek Villain"

== Production ==
The show was shot extensively across arid terrains of Jaisalmer and dunes of Jodhpur. It was inspired by Shakespeare's Othello and the TV show Guns and Roses.

On 31 May 2014, Rangrasiya had a crossover with TV Show, Beintehaa when Rudra and Paro had travelled to Mumbai for the treatment of Rudra's paralysed hand.

== Awards ==
| Year | Award | Category | Recipient | Result | Ref |
|---|---|---|---|---|---|
| 2014 | Asian Viewers Television Awards | Soap of the Year | Rangrasiya | Won | |
| 2014 | Asian Viewers Television Awards | Female Actor of the Year | Sanaya Irani | Won | |
| 2014 | Indian Television Academy Awards | Gr8! Performer of the Year | Ashish Sharma | Won | |
| 2014 | Indian Television Academy Awards | Best Title Music | | Won | |
| 2014 | Indian Television Academy Awards | Best Lyricist | | Won | |
