= Sasural Simar Ka =

Indian television soap opera

- Genre: Drama; Supernatural; Fantasy
- Created by: Rashmi Sharma
- Written by: Akashdeep; Pooja Shrivastav; Mahesh Pandey; Ved Raj; Sudhir Kumar; Sammohana Alva; Virendra Shahane; Shruti Tiwari; Saba Mumtaz
- Directed by: Pawan Kumar Marut; Pawan Sahu; Deelip Kumar
- Creative director: Dolly Mazumdar
- Starring: See below
- Country of origin: India
- Original language: Hindi
- No. of seasons: 2
- No. of episodes: 2054

Production
- Producers: Rashmi Sharma; Pawan Kumar Marut
- Camera setup: Multi-camera
- Running time: 21 minutes
- Production company: Rashmi Sharma Telefilms

Original release
- Network: Colors TV
- Release: 25 April 2011 – 2 March 2018

Related
- Sasural Simar Ka 2

Sasural Simar Ka (transl. Simar's In-Laws) is an Indian Hindi-language television soap opera produced by Rashmi Sharma Telefilms that aired from 25 April 2011 to 2 March 2018 on Colors TV. It is the second longest-running Indian television series on Colors TV, after Balika Vadhu.

== Plot ==
Roli and Simar are two sisters in Vrindavan, and Siddhant and Prem are two brothers in Delhi, belonging to the affluent and traditional Bharadwaj family. Simar aspires to be a dancer. Her marriage is fixed with Prem Bharadwaj. On the wedding day, Simar is blackmailed by Hichki to participate in a dance competition, and Roli is forced to marry Prem in her sister's place. After some time, Prem tells the whole family the truth that he is married to Roli. Mata ji then decides that Prem will remarry Roli in front of Simar. This creates problems as Simar and Prem start loving each other. Prem's brother, Siddhant, marries Roli, so that Prem and Simar can stay together. Eventually, the Bhardwaj family finally accepts Simar and Roli as their daughters-in-law. Mata ji then worries that Simar and Roli will rule the house instead of her, so Mata ji decides that she will do something to stop them from doing the housework. Mata ji puts naphthalene balls in Sujata's drink so she can accuse Simar and Roli of being so careless and stop them doing the housework. She then tries to take help from her sister Manoranjan to create differences between Simar and Roli. Uma and Pari is also attempting to Sabotage the sisters by replacing rasgullas with eggs, putting chilli powder in Roli's juice, and trying to ruin Simar's dance by placing glass shards on the floor. Eventually Manoranjan is video recorded while she was adding ajwain to Mataji's drink, who was allergic to ajwain. Mataji then announces a contest between the daughters-in-law, and Simar and Roli emerge victorious. Simar then suspects Prem of cheating on her, but it turns out he was trapping the girl, Anisha to give up the photos she had with his elder brother Shailendra, which she was using to blackmail him to show his wife Pari. However, she gets run over by a car while escaping from the police.

Khushi, who wants revenge for her sister's death, Anisha, marries Siddhant and Prem's cousin, Sankalp. Roli tries to expose the truth about Khushi but fails every time. Only Manoranjan believes Khushi is lying. Simar tells Roli to leave the house because everyone in the family believes that Roli is lying. Simar finds out that Khushi sold all her jewellery and replaced them with fake gold jewellery. Khushi tells her boyfriend Veeru to unlock the lock and steal the fake gold jewellery. Simar sees this and tries to snatch the bag from Veeru but falls down the stairs. As a result of this, Simar has a miscarriage. Khushi becomes the surrogate mother of Prem and Simar's child and blackmails Simar to sign the property papers. At Khushi's birthday party, Khushi is exposed about her reality to the whole family and was arrested by the police but Mata Ji took back the case and is spared by the police. Khushi gives birth to their daughter, Anjali, and grabs Bharadwajs' property with her lover, Veeru. Roli seduces Veeru and manages to retrieve the property papers. Enraged, Veeru shoots Simar, but she survives from coma and later Veeru kidnaps Roli and drives her off the cliff along with himself. Meanwhile, Naina has a crush on Siddhant and she pretends to be pregnant with his child after drugging him at a party. Simar, Sujata, Rajendra, Mausiji, Mataji and other family members reprimand Siddhant for having cheated on Roli. However, Prem proves his brother's innocence. Roli has lost all her memory and eventually Veeru makes her believe her name is Vidya and Veeru, as Vikram, is her husband. However, Simar finds out Roli and makes her regain her memories. Then Veeru shoots Roli and she is presumed dead. A doppelganger of Roli, Jhumki, is hired to return the property to the Bharadwaj family's name. They manage to expel Khushi and Veeru from the house. Veeru blackmails Jhumki by kidnapping her brother to kill Simar, but Jhumki tries to save her secretly every time. Finally, Jhumki is able to get back her brother with the help of police in a mysterious palace in the Bharadwaj name. Simar also discovers Roli alive, who was tortured and imprisoned in the palace.

Jhanvi is shown to be the kidnapper of Roli. It gets revealed that Jhanvi's father, Shakti, and Rajendra were business partners. But, Shakti attempted to rape Sujata but was killed by Mataji in the process, after which, Jhanvi's grandmother and Jhanvi ran away, and Shakti's wife committed suicide. Prem turns out to be Shakti's son later adopted by Rajendra and Sujata. He is now angered by the truth being hidden from him for 20 years, and initially sides with Jahnvi and her grandmother, Shobha. However, Shobha is arrested and she confesses that she had replaced her own stillbirth grandchild with Jhanvi, and she is actually Sujata's daughter. Hearing this, Jhanvi drops her gun she was pointing to Sujata, and is shocked. Then Shakti is discovered to be alive and deceiving the family along with Shobha to achieve the property. Both are arrested and Jhanvi and Prem are welcomed back into the family. Jhnavi then has to face a rich brat, Shaurya Singhania, who is injured and treat him in the hospital as she worked as a nurse there. Pari gives birth to a son called Aarav, and Pari's mother Aachla advises Pari to control the house as she is the mother of a boy now. She also shames Simar to be intent on taking away Pari's son from her as she is jealous with having just a daughter. Later on, Shaurya makes Jhanvi fell for him and marries her in temple only to take revenge of one slap. Jhanvi hides her marriage from the family, but it was not lasted so long as Shaurya spill the beans to Simar. Simar on the way home to confront Jhanvi, meanwhile Roli finds a nuptial chain in Jhanvi's cupboard. Then Jhanvi narrated the whole story to the sisters and they console her. Simar and Roli decided to speak to Meghna (Shaurya's sister) who is a social worker as they thought she could understand them but all of sudden Meghna backlashes them and taken side of Shaurya. As the tension bothers the sisters and Jhanvi, Manoranjan guessed something was fishy and vow to find it out. Later she comes to knew about the entire game Shaurya played with Jhanvi. Now it is a team of four who were out to destroy the Sighania's. Manoranjan came up with a great plan of using Roli as main lead of their plan as she was the only one who the both Singhania brother and sister had not met. They choose a name Sonia Oberoi a business women who still did not appear in front of social media. Roli in disguise meet Meghna as Sonia Oberoi. In a small time Roli inspires Meghna according to their plan. Also Manoranjan joins Roli as her Personal assistant Tina. Meghna kept the marriage proposal of Shaurya in front of Sonia Oberoi aka Roli. As per the plan the Roli should be faking the marriage with Shaurya and exposes his misdeeds in front of the media. On the day of wedding Jhanvi locks Roli in the room and marries Shaurya. The Bhardwaj family gatecrashes the wedding before final rites but shockingly Jhanvi wants to give Shaurya a second chance. Later Shaurya starts living in Bhardwaj house saying her sister ousted him from the house. While everyone thought Shaurya has changed, Roli gets under an attack continuously by an unknown stranger. To the surprise it was none other than Shaurya who seeks vengeance from Roli as she cheated on them. Day by day the Shaurya keeps blackmailing the sisters and making the Bhardwaj family against them. As Roli gets petrified by the actions of Shaurya, Simar makes a challenge to Shaurya that she will expose him in front of family within 48 hours. Next day Simar and Roli fools Shaurya exposing him in front of Jhanvi. Unable to bear the defeat, Shaurya takes Roli hostage and escapes. Afterwards to rescue Roli from Shaurya, Jhanvi shoots her husband to the death on the bed. Meghna vows to revenge her brother, Shaurya. Jhanvi attempts suicide in the depression of shooting Shaurya but the family rescues her. To make her erase the bitter moments of her life Mataji decided to plan a trip to Kul Devi temple. Taking the advantage of the family's absence Meghna made a special room in the Bharadwaj house and kidnapped the Bharadwaj family when they were coming from Kul Devi temple. Simar and Roli were in Vrindavan when this happened because Meghna prank call Simar saying that her mother is unwell and is admitted in hospital so Simar and Roli went to Vrindavan. When Simar and Roli arrived in Bharadwaj house they found that the house is empty. They begin to worry. The next morning, Simar and Roli found that Meghna kidnapped the whole Bharadwaj family, and Meghna said if they want the whole family safe, they have to play 4 tasks. Initially they did not believe her, but the evil Meghna kept that as the first task to speak with their family. In the first task the sisters to run barefeet in the mid-afternoon for over two kilometers and reach the town in 30 minutes and find a clue of a phone number and dial the family. While the task time starts on the family wakes up and find themselves in a dark room with no exit. Later, Simar and Roli successfully completes the first task by speaking with the family and also confirms that Meghna is the one who kidnapped them. After returning house completing the first task, Meghna asks them to be ready for the next task by tomorrow also opens a Two sided mirror in which the half was from bharadwaj house and the other is to the room Meghna built to kidnap the family. The whole family comes to know that they are being kept in their own house. On next day Meghna comes up with the second task. In this task Simar and Roli needs to prepare food for 100 people and serve them within two hours because only then Meghna provides food to the family. After numerous hurdles they manage to complete the task. Suddenly Mataji falls sick and need medicines. Meghna taking advantage of the situation designs the third task to save Mataji;s life. In this task Simar and Roli needs to hold the burning lamp in their hands for 24 hours without any break. They also completes this task given my Meghna and sends medicine to Mataji. In between all these tasks Sonia Oberoi tries to helps them and Meghna finds a letter and gives the final task to Simar and Roli to save their family and also mentions that if they fail the whole family will be dead. She Simar and Roli begin to realise where Meghna hid the Bharadwaj family so both sisters broke the 2-way mirror that Meghna put on so the Bharadwaj family can see how SimarRoli are suffering. Simar and Roli finally saved the Bharadwaj family, and Meghna was then arrested. Sonia Oberoi also contributed to helping Simar and Roli to find the Bharadwaj family.

Rani, a servant who join to work at Sonia Oberoi house as a servant. Slowly as the story develop she turn out to be Khushi who plan to kidnapped Sonia Oberoi on her wedding day to Sankalp Bhardwaj and Khushi dress as a bride and made Sonia Oberoi lookalike mask from Khushi best friend, Bobby. She then marries Sankalp and hide her truth face from the Bharadwaj family. Simar and Roli begin to doubt on fake Sonia Oberoi and on the first night of navrati Simar and Roli reveal the truth by showing fake Sonia Oberoi is Khushi to the whole colony.

Jhanvi then marries Dr. Anurag, but Buaji rejects the wedding on the grounds of Jhanvi being a widow and pregnant with another man's child. A contest of Bahu No 1 is held, where Simar partners with Jhanvi, and Roli is forced to partner with Bhakti Jaiswal, who had a childhood crush on Dr. Anurag. Roli is kidnapped by a politician, Jwala Devi, who had previously tried to capture the lands in the neighbourhood. Simar and Roli, disguised as NRIs, make Jwala Devi sign the papers and get back the land. Jwala Devi discovers that her son has gone mad due to heartbreak by Jhumki, Roli's doppelganger, who is mistaken for Roli. She escapes Jwala Devi's captivity and unintentionally runs over a woman named Sunaina, who dies. Sunaina's husband, Vikrant Mehta, kidnaps Simar and asks Simar to live with them as Sunaina, faking her death. Simar agrees to save Roli from going to jail for Sunaina's death.

=== 2 years later ===
Simar now lives as Sunaina, and raises Vikrant's daughter, Sanjana, while Roli takes care of Anjali. Simar returns to Bharadwajs' after meeting her sister coincidentally at the summer camp and meets Sunaina's spirit, who seeks vengeance on the Mehtas', who were behind her death. Roli and Siddhant also join Simar. Kartik, Vikrant's brother, ran a racket of selling body organs illegally, and when Sunaina apparently discovered it, Baa and Karthik had killed her. Siddhant tries to trap Kartik in the guise of a CBI officer, but gets caught and kidnapped by Baa. Simar and Roli collectively provides evidence to get Baa and Kartik arrested. Surbhi, Simar's husband Prem's fiance, comes to know that Simar is Simar and not Sunaina Mehta, and she tells this to the family. The family is furious and Prem rejects Simar, and throws her out of his house. Sunaina's spirit is ruling over Simar's body and tries to seduce Vikrant. Eventually, Sunaina is banished by rituals, but the relationship between Siddhant and Prem worsens as Siddhant supports Simar. There is a court case and Simar tearfully agrees to divorce Prem when he refuses to believe her story of Sunaina's spirit. Later, Simar is proven innocent and reunites with Prem and the rest of her family. Vikrant tries to murder Prem for his love for Simar but is eventually jailed after her kidnapping. Sanjana is adopted by Simar and Prem.

Later, the story comes to revolve around Simar, Roli, Prem and Siddhant and how they protect the Bharadwaj house from some supernatural creatures who want to destroy the Bhardwaj family. These supernatural creatures include the shapeshifting female serpent Maya who fakes to be Roli and tries to avenge her lover's death because of Vikrant, Dayans Mohini and Indravati who want to awaken a powerful dark entity from the underworld, Patali Devi. Patali Devi Gayatri is awakened and takes over Simar's body but Simar vanquishes her in her own realm. Then come the ghosts Maalti, Madhavi and Chhoti Dulhan, Shaitaan (Kaal), Moon Jewel Princess Chandramani and another two witches Mahamaya and Kamya. While defeating Patali Devi and Shaitan, Simar's life becomes endangered. Roli sacrifices her life to save Simar. After Roli's sad demise, Siddhant becomes depressed and moves abroad. The Chandramani comes to life and wipes out the Bharadwaj family's memories but Simar makes them remember the truth again. Due to Chandramani's notorious plan to get rid of Simar so her lost powers are regained from Siddhant, she makes Simar search the Chandrakant in a jungle where Simar faces a curse from a Saint Baba to reincarnate as a housefly. Simultaneously, Prerna and Mataji reveal the truth of Fake Simar residing in the house and save Simar on time back as a human leading to the end of Chandrakatha. After the gem Chandramani being buried at a misunderstood time by Simar, Mahamaya steals it so the Chudails' deity Kaal regains his powers and returns to the world. Mahamaya and Kamya (who resides inside the Bharadwaj house as Prem's childhood mate to assist her mother) casts a spell on Simar that impregnates her with a child possessing evil powers. Simar becomes aware of this mysterious plan and soon witnesses Kamya's real vintage. The family learns of this, too. Simar and Prem have a son, Piyush, who is actually an incarnation of Kaal. Being in doubt of the baby's spookiness and dark powers, the family asks Simar to donate the child. Simar refuses and leaves her in-laws with Piyush.

=== 16 years later ===
Simar is now separated from Prem and the rest of her family. Simar and Piyush eventually return to the Bharadwaj house and reunite with their family. Anjali, brought up by Khushi, has grown up to be a spoilt fashionista and blames Simar for abandoning her. Simar and Prem together help their children in their lives. Anjali marries Vikram Agarwal and Piyush marries his best friend, Roshni Kapoor. Anjali accepts Simar as her Mother. On Piyush's 25th birthday, he turned into a kaal and started to attack the Bharadwaj family. His action caused the death of Roshni's father. Vikram marries Tanvi, divorcing Anjali. Sanjana returns and is about to marry her college friend, Sameer. Anjali discovers that Sameer conspires against the Bharadwajs because of an old rivalry and marries him to spare herself from the same fate. Sameer turns her against her family and takes over the property. Sanjana marries him to make the Bharadwajs regain their wealth. Anjali falls into a coma after being shot by Simar.

Sameer's mother, Bhairavi, is revealed to have shot Anjali. She seeks revenge for her husband's death caused by Prem but turns out she had killed him herself. Simar rescues Prem from Bhairavi's clutches and he returns to his family. Sameer starts to realise that his mother is wrong and falls in love with Sanjana. Bhairavi cannot tolerate that Simar and Sanjana have turned her son against her so she sets out to seek vengeance. She turns into a daayan, absorbing supernatural powers and kills Simar on the first day of the holy Navratri by pushing her off a cliff. Mother Goddess Durga, deeply worshipped by the Bharadwaj family, enters their household in the form of Simar to destroy Bhairavi and bring Simar back to life. The new Simar destroys Bhairavi's evil powers and kills her ally, Mahish Baba. The real Simar also is resurrected who tells everyone Bhiravi's truth and how she tried to murder her and Bhairavi is sent to the prison. Seeing his mother's true and wicked nature, Sameer repents for his mistakes and the Bharadwajs forgive him, accepting him into the family. Roshni is shot to death by Aliya, who wants revenge for her father's death. Piyush turns mad due to Roshni's demise and goes missing.

=== 6 months later ===
Pari now rules the Bharadwaj family. Simar brings Piyush back with Avni and her mother, Hema, who took care of him. Piyush behaves like a child and likes Avni. Turns out Avni and Hema are Bhairavi's pawns to drift a mentally vulnerable Piyush away from Simar and his family so that Bhairavi gets revenge from Simar for snatching her son. Bhairavi returns from jail and pretends to have reformed, and Sanjana miscarries because of her secret plot. Sameer and Sanjana clash and have misunderstandings. Sanjana and Simar connect the dots and discover that Bhairavi has not changed at all and is still conspiring against the family. They try to stop Avni and Piyush's marriage but get captured by Bhairavi's men. They reach the house disguised as waiters and expose Avni, Hema and Bhairavi. Bhairavi holds the Bharadwajs hostage and sets a bomb on Simar. Avni has a change of heart and falls in love with Piyush and wants to help the Bharadwajs against Bhairavi. Because of her intervention, Bhairavi is cornered and Simar is set free from the bomb. Bhairavi fires her gun and kills Hema and the sounds of gunshots trigger the memories of Roshni's death in Piyush and he regains his memory at last.

In the end, Simar kills Bhairavi with a trident, establishing her role as her family's ultimate protector. Piyush marries Avni. The Bharadwajs worship the Mother Goddess and celebrate their victory and togetherness. Pari apologises to Simar for her past mistakes. Prem misses Siddhant and Simar misses Roli, and Nirmala says that the Bharadwaj family is not only a family but a thought. With this, the show ends on a happy note.

== Cast ==
=== Main ===
- Dipika Kakar as Simar Dwivedi Bharadwaj: Meena and Jamnalal's elder daughter (2011-2017)
  - Keerti Gaekwad Kelkar replaced Kakar as Simar (2017-2018)
- Avika Gor as
  - Roli Dwivedi Bharadwaj: Meena and Jamnalal's younger daughter (2011-2016)
  - Jhumki: A street dancer; Roli's doppelganger (2013)
- Shoaib Ibrahim as Prem Bharadwaj: Sujata and Rajendra's youngest son (2011-2013)
  - Dheeraj Dhoopar replaced Ibrahim as Prem (2013-2017)
  - Mazher Sayed replaced Dhoopar as Prem (2017-2018)
- Manish Raisinghan as Siddhant Bharadwaj: Sujata and Rajendra's third son (2011-2016)
- Vaishali Takkar as Anjali Bharadwaj: Simar and Prem's daughter (2016-2017)
  - Sneha Chauhan as Teenage Anjali (2016)
  - Ritvi Jain as Child Anjali (2014-2016)
- Varun Sharma as Piyush Bharadwaj: Simar and Prem's son (2016-2018)
  - Heer Morabia as Child Piyush (2016)
- Nikki Sharma as Roshni Kapoor Bharadwaj: Rita and Sumit's daughter (2016–2018)
  - Bhakti Vasani as Child Roshni (2016)
- Monica Sharma as Avni Bharadwaj: Hema's daughter (2018)
- Krissann Barretto as Sanjana "Sanju" Bharadwaj Kapoor: Vikrant and Sunaina's daughter (2017–2018)
  - Tvisha Jain as Child Sanjana (2014–2016)
- Rohan Mehra as Sameer Kapoor: Bhairavi and Dhanraj's son (2017–2018)

=== Recurring ===
==== Dwivedis ====
- Pankaj Dheer as Jamnalal Dwivedi: Rajjo's brother (2011–2012)
- Jaya Ojha as Meena Dwivedi: Jamnalal's wife (2011–2012; 2014; 2016)
- Rakshit Wahi as Gautam Dwivedi: Meena and Jamnalal's son (2011–2012; 2014)
- Himani Shivpuri as Rajjo Dwivedi: Jamnalal's sister (2011–2012)

==== Bhardwajs ====
- Jayati Bhatia as Nirmala Devi "Mataji" Bharadwaj: Matriarch of Bharadwaj family (2011-2018)
- Adarsh Gautam as Rajendra Bharadwaj: Nirmala's elder son (2011-2017)
- Nishigandha Wad as Sujata Bharadwaj: Rajendra's wife (2011-2016) (Dead)
- Ashu Sharma as Satyendra "Sattu" Bharadwaj: Sujata and Rajendra's eldest son (2011-2017)
- Snehal Sahay as Uma Bharadwaj: Satyendra's wife (2011-2017)
- Sahil Anand / Ssumier Pasricha / Vishal Nayak as Shailendra "Shailu" Bharadwaj: Sujata and Rajendra's second son (2011) / (2011-2015) / (2015-2017)
- Shweta Sinha as Pari Bharadwaj: Archala's elder daughter (2011-2018)
- Khushwant Walia as Aarav Bhardwaj: Pari and Shailendra's son (2013–2017)
- Kenisha Bharadwaj as Ananya Bhardwaj: Ridhima's sister (2017)
- Mansi Srivastava as Prerna Srivastava Bharadwaj: Simar and Roli's childhood friend (2016)
- Ashiesh Roy as Suryendra Bhardwaj: Nirmala's younger son (2011–2013)
- Jhanvi Vohra as Karuna Bhardwaj: Suryendra's wife (2011–2016)
- Abhishek Sharma / Aryamann Seth as Sankalp Bhardwaj: Suryendra and Karuna's son (2011–2017)
- Jyotsna Chandola as Khushi Bharadwaj: Anisha's sister (2012–2017)
- Kanchi Singh as Cherry Bhardwaj: Suryendra and Karuna's daughter (2011-2012)

==== Malhotras ====
- Alan Kapoor as Amar Malhotra: Jhanvi's husband (2014-2017)
- Falaq Naaz as Jhanvi Bharadwaj Malhotra: Sujata and Rajendra's daughter (2013-2017)

==== Aroras ====
- Karuna Verma as Shanti Arora: Anurag's mother (2013–2014)
- Aniruddh Singh as Dr. Anurag Arora: Shanti's son (2014–2015)
- Kanika Shivpuri as Pratima Arora: Anurag's aunt (2014)

==== Kapoors ====
- Rushad Rana as Sumeet Kapoor: Rita's husband (2016–2017)
- Jasveer Kaur as Rita Kapoor: Sumeet's wife (2016–2017)
- Abhinandan Jindal as Rohan Kapoor: Rita and Sumit's son (2016)
  - Bhavesh Babani as Child Rohan Kapoor (2016)

==== Agarwals ====
- Vikas Sethi as Sanjeev Agarwal: Ravikant's brother (2016–2017)
- Siddharth Shivpuri as Vikram Agarwal: Sanjeev's son (2016–2017)
- Sneha Shah as Tanvi Agarwal: Vikram's second wife (2017)
- Sanjeev Jogityani as Ravikant Agarwal: Sanjeev's brother (2016–2017)
- Shweta Gautam as Saroj Agarwal: Ravikant's wife (2016–2017)

==== Others ====
- Nimisha Vakharia as Manoranjan Singh: Nirmala's sister (2011–2015)
- Priya Marathe as Hema (2011)
- Priyamvada Kant as Anisha: Khushi's sister (2012) (Dead)
- Vishal Aditya Singh as Veeru: Khushi's boyfriend (2012–2013)
- Sana Amin Sheikh as Naina Kapoor: Siddhant's ex-fiancée (2012–2013)
- Pratish Vora as Bunty: Jhumki's brother (2013)
- Rohit Khurana as Shaurya Singhania: Meghna's brother (2013) (Dead)
- Swati Chitnis as Shobha (2013)
- Shikha Singh as Meghna Singhania: Shaurya's sister (2013–2014)
- Aruna Singhal / Roma Bali as Archala: Pari and Surbhi's mother (2013–2014)
- Nehalaxmi Iyer as Surbhi: Archala's younger daughter (2014)
- Amita Khopkar as Jwala Devi (2014)
- Anshul Trivedi as Shrikant: Jwala's son (2014) (Dead)
- Shivangi Sharma as Bhakti Jaiswal: Anurag's friend (2014)
- Bobby Darling as fictionalized version of herself: Khushi's bestfriend (2014)
- Shalini Sahuta as Sonia Oberoi (2014)
- Minal Karpe as Savita Mehta: Vikrant and Kartik's mother (2014)
- Aadesh Chaudhary as Vikrant Mehta: Savita's elder son (2014)
- Neetha Shetty as Sunaina Mehta / Aditi Shah: Vikrant's wife (2014) (Dead)
- Pratik Shukla as Kartik Mehta: Savita's younger son (2014)
- Pratap Sachdeo as Sarpanch Ji (2014) (Dead)
- Sara Khan as Maya / Fake Roli: Shapeshifting serpent "Naagin" (2014–2015)
- Shyam Mashalkar as Calender: Amar bestfriend (2014-2015)
- Priyanka Bhole as Leela (2014) (Dead)
- Mughda Shah as Daksha Baa (2014) (Dead)
- Khyati Keswani as Vaishnavi Ji (2014) (Dead)

==== Villians ====
- Siddharth Vasudev as Rajveer Singh: Manoranjan's son (2015)
- Sayantani Ghosh as Rajkumari Rajeshwari Parmar (2015) (Dead)
- Kunickaa Sadanand as Thakurain (2015) (Dead)
- Kajol Srivastav as Vaidehi Saxena: Piyush's ex-fiancée (2016–2017)
- Vishal Bharadwaj as Arjun Trivedi: Anjali's boyfriend (2017)
- Abdur Rehman Shaikh as Shera (2017)
- Preetika Chauhan as Riddhima: Ananya's sister (2017)
- Ishani Sharma as Aliya Chaudhary: Roshni's murderer (2017–2018)
- Vandana Vithlani as Bhairavi Kapoor: Dhanraj's widow and murderer (2017–2018) (Dead)
- Sujata Vaishnav as Hema Sabharwal: Avni's mother (2018)
- Shabaaz Abdullah Badi as Rahul Arora: Avni's friend (2018)

==== Supernatural creatures ====
- Pratyusha Banerjee as Mohini: a witch (2015) (Dead)
- Anjali Gupta as Sunanda: a witch (2015) (Dead)
- Reshmi Ghosh as Indravati: a witch (2015) (Dead)
- Hemant Choudhary as Gajendra: Simar's father from her previous birth Padmavati (2015)
- Meghna Naidu as Patali Devi Gayatri (2015–2016) (Dead)
- Deblina Chatterjee as Devika: Simar's helper (2015–2016)
- Ali Hassan as Shaitaan (2016) (Dead)
- Arti Singh as Madhavi (2016)
- Shagufta Ali as Malti/Fake Sugandha (2016)
- Kashvi Kothari as Choti Dulhan/Ruhi (2016)
- Vindhya Tiwari as Chandramani (2016)
- Vaishnavi Dhanraj as Kamya Raichand: Mahamaya daughter (2016)
- Kamalika Guha Thakurta as Mahamaya: Kamya mother (2016)

=== Special appearances ===
- Shah Rukh Khan
- Mahhi Vij as Nakusha Laagi Tujhse Lagan
- Emraan Hashmi from Murder 2
- Jacqueline Fernandez from Murder 2
- Ranbir Kapoor from Rockstar
- Nargis Fakhri from Rockstar
- Sidharth Malhotra from Ek Villain (2014)
- Shraddha Kapoor from Ek Villain (2014)
- Varun Dhawan from Humpty Sharma Ki Dulhania (2014)
- Alia Bhatt from Humpty Sharma Ki Dulhania (2014)
- Drashti Dhami as Madhubala Kundra from Madhubala – Ek Ishq Ek Junoon
- Vivian Dsena as Rishabh Kundra (RK) from Madhubala – Ek Ishq Ek Junoon
- Tina Dutta as Ichha Singh Bundela from Uttaran
- Rashami Desai as Tapasya Pratap Rathore from Uttaran
- Gaurav Chopra as Raghuvendra Pratap Rathore from Uttaran
- Nandish Sandhu as Veer Singh Bundela from Uttaran
- Toral Rasputra as Anandi Shekhar from Balika Vadhu
- Sidharth Shukla as Shivraj Shekhar from Balika Vadhu
- Ashish Sharma as Rudra Pratap Ranawat from Rangrasiya
- Sanaya Irani as Paro from Rangrasiya
- Harshad Arora as Zain Abdullah from Beintehaa
- Preetika Rao as Aaliya Zain Abdullah from Beintehaa
- Helly Shah as Swara Maheshwari from Swaragini
- Varun Kapoor as Sanskaar Maheshwari from Swaragini
- Namish Taneja as Lakshya Maheshwari from Swaragini
- Tejasswi Prakash as Ragini Maheshwari from Swaragini
- Manish Goplani as Bihaan from Thapki Pyaar Ki
- Jigyasa Singh as Thapki from Thapki Pyaar Ki
- Shakti Arora as Ranveer Raghvela from Meri Aashiqui Tum Se Hi
- Radhika Madan as Ishani Ranveer Raghvela from Meri Aashiqui Tum Se Hi
- Mouni Roy as Shivanya Singh from Naagin 1
- Rubina Dilaik as Soumya Singh from Shakti - Astitva Ke Ehsaas Ki
- Ankitta Sharma as Naina Singh Chauhan from Ek Shringaar-Swabhiman

== Sequel ==
A sequel of the show, named Sasural Simar Ka 2, has been telecast on the same channel Colours TV since 26 April 2021, ten years after the first season debuted.

== Production ==
=== Casting ===
It first starred Dipika Kakar, Shoaib Ibrahim, Avika Gor and Manish Raisinghan as Simar, Prem, Roli and Siddhant, respectively. Jayati Bhatia played the role of Mataji. Shoaib Ibrahim left the show in 2013 as makers were not giving his character much screen space disappointment with the creative independence of the character. He was replaced by Dheeraj Dhoopar who played the role of Prem after Shoaib's exit from the show. In April 2016, Avika Gor left the show as she wanted a break after working non-stop for 5 years. Thus, her character Roli died. Mansi Srivastava entered the show as Prerna as Simar childhood friend. In July 2016, Mansi Srivastava and Manish Raisinghan also left the show. So, their respective characters of Prerna and Siddhant were shown to have shifted abroad. In August 2016, Vaishali Takkar and Varun Sharma entered the show as Anjali and Piyush, respectively. In February 2017, Dipika Kakar and Dheeraj Dhoopar left the show, so their respective characters of Simar and Prem were shown to go on a business trip. In May 2017, Krissann Barretto entered the show as Sanjana. At the end of May 2017 Mazher Sayed joined the show as Prem. In July 2017, Vaishali Takkar left the show. So her character of Anjali was arrested. In January 2018, Nikki Sharma also left the show. So her character of Roshni died. In the same month, Monica Sharma entered the show in the role of Avni.

=== Genre ===
The series began and ran as a normal television drama until in 2014 when it included supernatural spirits, serpents and witches and fantasy genres with tracks inspired from Game of Thrones and Eega.

=== Cancellation and sequel ===
The series was confirmed going off air on 2 March 2018 owing its declining ratings and the climax was decided but days before the shooting was about to complete, it received an extension on last minute discussions between the channel and production house and the script was reworked. In February 2021, the series was confirmed returning with a new season titled, Sasural Simar Ka 2, featuring Dipika Kakar and Jayati Bhatia from the former season and Radhika Muthukumar, Tanya Sharma, Avinash Mukherjee and Karan Sharma as the new leads of the show.

=== Location ===
Based on Delhi as backdrop, Sasural Simar Ka was mainly filmed at the sets in Cine Classic Studios at Mira Road. Some episodes are shot in Hong Kong for their 1000th episodes celebration.

== Reception ==
The series became one of the most watched Hindi GECs during its run time. In week 52 of 2015 it was at fifth position garnering 12.33 million impressions. In week 2 of 2016, it was at third position with 13.46 million impressions.

== Awards and nominations ==
Year	Awards	Category	Recipient(s)	Result	Ref.
2011	Colors Golden Petal Awards	Most Popular Series	Sasural Simar Ka	Nominated	
2011	Colors Golden Petal Awards	Favorite Face – Male	Shoaib Ibrahim	Nominated	
2011	Colors Golden Petal Awards	Favorite Face – Female	Dipika Kakar	Nominated	
2011	Colors Golden Petal Awards	Most Mazedaar Personality	Himani Shivpuri	Won	
2011	Colors Golden Petal Awards	Best Family	Bhardwaj family	Nominated	
2012	Indian Telly Awards	Best Drama Series (Popular)	Sasural Simar Ka	Nominated	
2012	Apsara Film Producers Guild Awards	Best Actor in a Drama Series	Shoaib Ibrahim	Nominated	
2012	Colors Golden Petal Awards	Most Sanskaari Vyaktitva	Dipika Kakar	Won	
2012	Colors Golden Petal Awards	Most Mazedaar Personality	Nimisha Vakharia	Won	
2012	Indian Television Academy Awards	Best Serial (Popular)	Sasural Simar Ka	Nominated	
2013	Indian Telly Awards	Best Drama Series	Sasural Simar Ka	Won	
2013	Indian Telly Awards	Best Actress	Avika Gor	Nominated	
2013	Indian Telly Awards	Best Actress in a Negative Role	Jyotsna Chandola	Nominated	
2013	Colors Golden Petal Awards	Most Bhavuk Personality	Dipika Kakar	Won	
2013	Colors Golden Petal Awards	Favorite Face – Female	Dipika Kakar	Nominated	
2013	Colors Golden Petal Awards	Favorite Face – Female	Avika Gor	Nominated	
2013	Colors Golden Petal Awards	Janbaaz Personality	Avika Gor	Won	
2013	Colors Golden Petal Awards	Favorite Face – Male	Manish Raisinghan	Won	
2013	Colors Golden Petal Awards	Most Damdaar Personality	Jayati Bhatia	Won	
2013	Gold Awards	Best Actress	Avika Gor	Nominated	
2015	Indian Television Academy Awards	Best Drama Series (Popular)	Sasural Simar Ka	Nominated	
2015	Indian Telly Awards	Best Daily Serial	Sasural Simar Ka	Nominated	
2015	Indian Telly Awards	Best Actress	Dipika Kakar	Nominated	
2015	Gold Awards	Best Daily Serial	Sasural Simar Ka	Nominated	
2015	Gold Awards	Best Actress	Dipika Kakar	Nominated	
2016	Colors Golden Petal Awards	Best Actor	Dheeraj Dhoopar	Nominated	
2016	Colors Golden Petal Awards	Best Actress	Dipika Kakar	Nominated	
2016	Colors Golden Petal Awards	Best Actor in a Supporting Role	Manish Raisinghan	Won	
2016	Colors Golden Petal Awards	Best Actress in a Supporting Role	Avika Gor	Nominated	
2016	Gold Awards	Best Actress	Dipika Kakar	Nominated	
2016	Gold Awards	Best Actress (Critics)	Dipika Kakar	Won	
2016	Gold Awards	Best Supporting Actress	Jayati Bhatia	Won	
2017	Colors Golden Petal Awards	Best Comic Actor in a Fiction Series	Snehal Sahay	Won	
