= Beintehaa =

Indian romantic drama TV series

- Genre: Romantic; Drama
- Created by: Fortune Productions
- Directed by: Maan Sinh Minku, Deepak Saini, Ankur Bhatiya
- Creative director: Farhan Salaruddin
- Starring: See below
- Opening theme: Shanaya; Parth
- Country of origin: India
- Original languages: Hindi, Urdu
- No. of seasons: 1
- No. of episodes: 235

Production
- Producer: Farhan Salaruddin
- Running time: Approx. 24 minutes
- Production company: Fortune Productions

Original release
- Network: Colors TV
- Release: 30 December 2013 – 21 November 2014

Beintehaa (transl. Extreme) is an Indian romantic television series that premiered on 30 December 2013 on Colors TV. Produced by Farhan Salaruddin under Fortune Productions. The show revolving around Muslim families where the two protagonists have a love-hate relationship, but they end up marrying each other. It starred debutantes Preetika Rao and Harshad Arora in lead roles.

== Plot ==
Charming, flamboyant Zain, and pretty, cultured Aaliya have been rival cousins since childhood. They eventually grow up and meet again, but a series of misunderstandings lead them to marry each other. Zain wants to get rid of his "Maammu Ki Bhanji" aka Aaliya as he calls her, as soon as possible. He does not believe in the institution of marriage. His brother, Fahad has two wives, Nafisa and Shazia who hate each other.

Fahad's mom Suraiya wanted a grandson; Nafisa was unable to conceive anymore after having two girls. So, Fahad married Shazia and they had a son. He loves both his wives. Zain and Aaliya constantly bickers, but slowly with time, "KitKit and MKB" finally become friends. Zain is injured in an accident. The accident was caused by Rocky, a brothel owner who tries to deceive Aaliya's sister Aayat, but Zain saves her and puts Rocky behind the bars. This accident however brings Zain and Aaliya closer to each other.

Suraiya emotionally blackmails Aaliya, making her leave. But Zain brings her back. Fahad and his father Usman plan to make Zain and Aaliya fall in love. Suraiya dislikes Aaliya and her family because Barkat, her long-lost daughter was kidnapped by Aaliya's estranged uncle, Mir Khan. Zain and Aaliya finally find Barkat. Joyous, Suraiya starts liking Aaliya and her family again, which makes Shazia and Nafisa unhappy.

Zain and Aaliya finally realize their love for each other. Zain feels jealous whenever he sees Aaliya and Zubair together (they are cousins, actually). On the other hand, Nafisa's brother, Rizwan has fallen for Aayat too. Out of angst, Zain unintentionally hurts Aaliya's feelings, who leaves for her hometown Bhopal and leaves a message asking him to realize his mistake. Zain reaches Bhopal and after escaping a tragedy, Zain and Aali

Aaliya soon find arkat's behavior suspicious, and it revealed she is actually Mir's biological daughter who is after the Abdullahs' family wealth and property. Zain and Aaliya expose Barkat, who is thrown out of the house, but before going, she poisons Suraiya's mind against Aaliya, telling her she is having an affair with Zubair. Thus Suraiya again starts hating Aaliya.

She plots to separate Zain and Aaliya by creating misunderstandings between them. Due to a major misunderstanding created by Nafisa, Zain begins hating Aaliya, unknowingly. Usman meets with an accident and become paralyzed and Aaliya is held responsible for that as she was the one who sent him to the office.

Aaliya gets help from lawyer Rehan, a single father of two children, and a family friend of the Abdullah's. He tries to get to the bottom of the truth regarding the arrest and finds out it was Nafisa. He plots a plan to make her think Usman is alive, which frightens her and causes her to expose herself before him.

Aaliya is still hurt by Zain's mistrust in her and decides to start afresh somewhere else. Having realized her wrongdoings, Nafisa apologizes and tells Aaliya to not reveal her misdeeds for the sake of her daughters. Aaliya forgives and tells her she's moving away. Rehan sends Nafisa's recording to Zain, who realizes his mistake and rushes to stop Aaliya but it is too late. He breaks down but vows to find her and win her back.

A year later, Aaliya lives in Hyderabad and is a proud owner of "Bawarchi Dhaba". On the other hand, a completely broken and devastated Zain always goes to Usman's grave and repenting his mistake, and still searches for Aaliya every day. Nafisa still seeks forgiveness from Zain, who began hating her after her betrayal for a year. She wishes Zain and Aaliya find their way back to each other.

On a visit to Hyderabad, as fate would have it, Zain finds Aaliya but she is still cold towards him. Heartbroken, Zain attempts to win her back and eventually succeeds. Zain and Aaliya decide to remarry in a mosque, but the Qazi finds out about their divorce and tells Aaliya that she has to do 'Nikah Halala' to remarry Zain.

With no other option left, Aaliya decides to marry Bilal, Zain's cousin, in order to remarry Zain. Bilal gets kidnapped and Aaliya eventually marries Rehan. Zain finds out Rehan is plotting against Suraiya as he thinks she killed his first wife. Suraiya finds out the truth about Aaliya's innocence from Nafisa. It is revealed Suraiya didn't kill Rehan's wife, who indeed committed suicide. Zain saves Rehan's daughter from an accident. Rehan apologizes.

Zain and Aaliya finally get married. Suraiya and Fahad are still cold towards Nafisa but Aaliya tells them to forgive her. Zain's doppelganger, Rocket is brought into the house as Zain by Suraiya's evil sister, Zarina. Later, the truth comes out, and the real Zain appears as he was kidnapped. Again, he and Aaliya are reunited. Regretful, Zarina apologizes.

Nafisa is pregnant again. The whole family is happy except Shazia, who plots to harm her. But Nafisa saves Shazia's son, Saif who is nearly hurt. Shazia also realizes her mistake and accepts she tried to kill the baby, but everyone makes her realize she and Nafisa can't compete with each other, and Fahad treats both wives equally and loves them both.

7 years later, Zain and Aaliya have a son, Zayed Zain Abdullah. Rizwan and Aayat too have a daughter, Kashish. They both bicker, which reminds Zain and Aaliya of their childhood "Tom and Jerry" fights. Suraiya and the Abdullahs appear to hold Usman's frame and remember him on his death anniversary. Finally, they all live happily together.

== Cast and characters ==
=== Main ===
- Harshad Arora as Zain Abdullah: Osman and Surraiya's younger son; Fahad's younger brother; Aaliya's husband; Zayed's father
- Preetika Rao as Aaliya Abdullah: Ghulam and Shabana's elder daughter; Aayat's elder sister; Zain's wife; Zayed's mother

=== Recurring ===
- Vikas Grover as Rizwan Malik: Nafisa's brother; Aayat's husband; Kashish's father
- Shivangi Joshi as Aayat Malik: Ghulam ans Shabana's younger daughter; Aaliya's younger sister; Rizwan's wife; Kashish's mother
- Naved Aslam as Osman Abdullah: Shabana's brother; Surraiya's husband; Fahad and Zain's father; Nafisa, Shazia and Aaliya's father-in-law; Zayed's paternal grandfather
- Suchitra Pillai as Surraiya Abdullah: Zarina's sister; Osman's wife; Fahad and Zain's mother; Nafisa, Shazia and Aaliya's mother-in-law; Zayed's paternal grandmother
- Vivek Madan as Fahad Abdullah: Osman and Surraiya's elder son; Zain's elder brother; Nafisa and Shazia's husband
- Gunjan Vijaya as Nafisa Abdullah: Rizwan's sister; Fahad's first wife
- Namrata Pathak as Shazia Abdullah: Fahad's second wife
- Rituraj Singh as Ghulam Haider: Shabana's husband; Aaliya and Aayat's father; Zain and Rizwan's father-in-law; Zayed and Kashish's maternal grandfather
- Riva Bubber as Shabana Haider: Osman's sister; Ghulam's wife; Aaliya and Aayat's mother; Zain and Rizwan's mother-in-law; Zayed and Kashish's maternal grandmother
- Nandish Sandhu as Rehan Khan: Habeeb's son;
- Astha Agarwal as Rida Khan: Rehan's first wife
- Raju Kher as Dr. Habeeb Khan: Rehan's father
- Imran Khan as Rahim Qureshi: Zarina's husband;
- Kamya Panjabi as Zarina Qureshi: Surraiya's sister;
- Neel Motwani as Bilal Qureshi: Zarina and Rahim's son;
- Dimple Jhangiani as Barkat Abdullah/Bobby Khan: Mir's daughter;
- Ankush Bali as Rafeeq Qureshi
- Mohit Sinha as Sarju (Aaliya's Dhaba Employee)
- Mohit Malhotra as Zubair Qureshi: Aaliya and Aayat's cousin
- Sunil Sinha as Mir Khan: Ghulam's brother; Bobby's fathe
- Wasim Faras as Zeeshan Ahmed: Zoya's son; Aaliya's ex-fiancé
- Vaishali Jhulka as Asmita Ahmed
- Farook Qaasi as Mohsin Ahmed
- Gaurav Devaiyya as Omar Ahmed
- Priya Shinde as Sanam: Zain's ex-fiancée
- Vishesh Bansal as Zayed Abdullah: Aaliya and Zain's son
- Sheela Sharma as Zoya Ahmed
- Madhuri Sanjeev as Chan bibi
- Puru Chibber as Rocky Singh
- Ahmad Harhash as Rajveer Singh

==== Guest appearance ====
- Akshay Kumar (Eid Special to promote his film It's Entertainment with Tamannaah Bhatia)
- Toral Rasputra as Anandi (Balika Vadhu)
- Sanaya Irani as Parvati (Rangrasiya Crossover episode)
- Ashish Sharma as Rudra (Rangrasiya Crossover episode)
- Drashti Dhami as Madhu (Madhubala Ek Ishq Ek Junoon)
- Tina Datta as Meethi (Uttaran)
- Rashami Desai from (Uttaran)
- Siddharth Shukla as Shiv (Balika Vadhu)
- Mrunal Jain as Akash (Uttaran)
- Dipika Kakar as Simar (Sasural Simar Ka)
- Dheeraj Dhoopar as Prem (Sasural Simar Ka)
- Manish Raisinghan as Siddhant (Sasural Simar Ka)
- Avika Gor as Roli (Sasural Simar Ka)
- Tejasswi Prakash as Dhara (Sanskaar - Dharohar Apnon Ki)

== Reception ==
Beintehaa received appreciation from the audience and stood at a steady 3.0 TVM figure for consecutive weeks. The show went off-air after successfully completing 11 months on 21 November 2014. In an interview Arora says, "We didn’t want to drag on we wanted to end the show on a high note. Also added, Making such a debut was a blessing."

Beintehaa was again reaired as "Pyaar Ka Fitoor" from 21 October 2021 and was broadcast on Colors Rishtey, just a month before its 7-year completion anniversary.

== Awards and nominations ==
Year	Award	Category	Work	Result
2014	Gold Awards	Best On-Screen Jodi	Beintehaa	Nominated
2014	Gold Awards	Best Debut Actress Preetika Rao	Beintehaa	Won
2014	Indian Television Academy Awards	GR8! Onscreen Couple Of The Year	Beintehaa	Won
2014	Indian Television Academy Awards	Performance of the Year (Both)	Beintehaa	Nominated
2014	Indian Telly Awards	Best Fresh New Face (Female) Preetika Rao	Beintehaa	Nominated
2014	Indian Television Academy Awards	Desh Ka Sitara Best Actor Harshad Arora	Beintehaa	Won
2014	Indian Telly Awards	Fresh New Face (Male) Harshad Arora	Beintehaa	Won
2014	Indian Telly Awards	Best Actor Popular (Male)	Beintehaa	Nominated
2014	Gold Awards	Best Actor Debut (Male) Harshad Arora	Beintehaa	Won

== Crossover episodes ==
On 31 May 2014, Beintehaa had a crossover with the TV show Rangrasiya.
