= Maa Hai Na =

2026 Indian reality cooking show

- माँ है ना
- Genre: Reality; Cooking show; Comedy
- Presented by: Shilpa Shetty (host); Gaurav Kapoor (co-host); Ali Asgar (special host); Chandan Prabhakar (special host)
- Starring: Urvashi Dholakia; Bhagyashree; Sunita Ahuja; Tina Ahuja; Manisha Rani; Tanya Mittal; Shahida Ansari; Gullu (Kushal Tanwar)
- Country of origin: India
- Original language: Hindi

Production
- Executive producers: Preeti Simoes; Neeti Simoes

Original release
- Network: ZEE5
- Release: 12 June 2026

Maa Hai Na (transl. Mom's Here) is a 2026 Indian Hindi-language reality cooking series scheduled to premiere on ZEE5 on 12 June 2026. It is hosted by Shilpa Shetty and produced by Preeti Simoes and Neeti Simoes.

Celebrity contestants compete in pairs, each pairing a public figure with a parent or adult child, in cooking challenges and comedy segments.

== Format ==
Each episode pairs a celebrity with a parent or adult child to compete in cooking tasks and team challenges. The show was announced on Mother's Day 2026; filming had already begun by that date.

== Contestants ==
- Tanya Mittal and Sunita Mittal
- Bhagyashree (BhagyaBro) and Rinju Sharma
- Gullu (Kushal) and Munesh Tanwar (Winners)
- Tina Ahuja and Sunita Ahuja
- Kshitij Dholakia and Urvashi Dholakia (First Runners-ups)
- Afghan and Shahida Ansari
- Manisha Rani and Manoj Kumar Chandi (Late entry)

== Production ==
The show was produced by Preeti Simoes and Neeti Simoes, who had previously produced Khatra Khatra Khatra on Indian television. Filming had finished before the June premiere.

At the trailer launch on 27 May 2026, Shetty said: "It's my first show, by the way, as a host. I have done many TV shows as a judge but hosting is very difficult."

Nikita Rawal, who had appeared on Bigg Boss, competed on the series as a contestant.

== Release ==
A trailer was released in late May 2026. The series premiered on ZEE5 on 12 June 2026.
