= Toral Rasputra =

Indian television actress (born 1987)

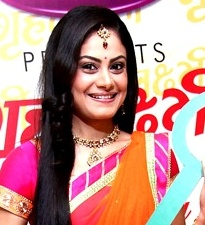
- Rasputra in 2015
- Born: 26 December 1987 (age 38); Mumbai, Maharashtra, India
- Occupation: Actress
- Years active: 2007–present
- Spouse: Dhaval (m. 2012; div. 2018)

Toral Rasputra (born 26 December 1987) is an Indian television actress. Rasputra has appeared in many well known successful shows, but is best recognized for starring as Anandi from 2013 to 2016 in Colors TV's Balika Vadhu, one of the longest-running Hindi television show.

== Television ==
Year	Serial	Role	Channel	Notes	Ref(s)
2007	Risshton Ki Dor	Shaina	Sony Entertainment Television		
2007–2008	Dhoom Machaao Dhoom	Priyanka	Disney Channel		
2007–2008	Yahaan Ke Hum Sikandar	Raima	Zee Next		
2009–2011	Kesariya Balam Aavo Hamare Des	Rasal	Sahara One		
2011	Ek Nayi Chhoti Si Zindagi	Isha	Zee TV		
2012	Lakhon Mein Ek	Bhavna	Star Plus	Episodic/ Cameo	
2013–2016	Balika Vadhu	Anandi Shivraj Shekhar	Colors TV		
2016	Box Cricket League 2	Contestant	Colors TV		
2017–2019	Mere Sai - Shraddha Aur Saburi	Bayja Maa	Sony Entertainment Television		
2018	Namune	Bhairavi Agnihotri	Sony Sab		
2019	Udaan	Chakor Suraj Rajvanshi	Colors TV		
2019–2020	Jag Janani Maa Vaishno Devi – Kahani Mata Rani Ki	Maharani Samriddhi	Star Bharat		
2021	Molkki	Sakshi Veerendra Pratapsingh	Colors TV	Antagonist	
2022	Dharm Yoddha Garud	Devi Vinta	Sony SAB		
2023–2024	Doree	Manasi Singh	Colors TV		
2026--Present	Hastinapur Ke Veer	Kunti	Sony Sab		

=== Special appearances ===
Year	Serial	Role
2013	Madhubala – Ek Ishq Ek Junoon	Anandi
2013	Uttaran	Anandi
2014	Beintehaa	Anandi
2014	Rangrasiya	Anandi
2014	Jhalak Dikhhla Jaa	Anandi
2014	Meri Aashiqui Tum Se Hi	Anandi
2015	Comedy Nights Bachao	Anandi
2015	Udaan	Anandi
2016	Comedy Nights Live	Anandi
2016	Sasural Simar Ka	Anandi
2019	Roop - Mard Ka Naya Swaroop	Chakor Suraj Rajvanshi
2024	Suhaagan: Ke Rang Jashn Ke Rang	Manasi Thakur

== Plays ==
Year	Play	Role
2017	I love you two	Meera
2018	Marriage Mantra	Sunidhi
2025	Tame pehla Jeva Nathi Rahya	Wife
