= Jhalak Dikhhla Jaa season 11 =

Jhalak Dikhhla Jaa
- Season 11
- Promotional poster for season 11, featuring the judges and the original celebrity cast
- Hosted by: Gauahar Khan; Rithvik Dhanjani
- Judges: Malaika Arora; Arshad Warsi; Farah Khan; Sambhavna Seth
- No. of contestants: 17
- Celebrity winner: Manisha Rani
- Professional winner: Ashutosh Pawar
- No. of episodes: 33

Release
- Original network: Sony Entertainment Television
- Original release: 11 November 2023 – 2 March 2024

Season chronology
- ← Previous; Season 10

Jhalak Dikhhla Jaa 11 is the eleventh season of the dance reality show, Jhalak Dikhhla Jaa. The series was hosted by Gauahar Khan and Rithvik Dhanjani and judged by Arshad Warsi, Farah Khan and Malaika Arora. The series premiered on 11 November 2023 on Sony Entertainment Television and is also available digitally on SonyLIV.

Manisha Rani and her professional partner Ashutosh Pawar were announced as the winners on 2 March 2024, winning ₹30 lakh (US$36,000) and ₹10 lakh (US$12,000) respectively, a mirrorball trophy, and a complementary trip to Yas Island.

== Format ==
The couples dance each week in a pre-recorded show that airs on weekends. The judges score each performance out of ten, and the couples are then ranked according to these scores. The public is also invited to vote for their favorite couples using the SonyLIV app. The judges' scores and public votes are combined in a 50:50 ratio.

The bottom-two couples perform a dance-off named Last Chance to Dance in the following week's episode. Based solely on this performance, each judge gives scores to the couple. The couple with the lower total is eliminated, while the one with the higher scores is safe. If it is their only performance, those scores are added to the scorecard; otherwise, they are discarded.

== Cast ==
=== Couples ===
Note: Since the finalists and runner-ups among the Top 5 were only announced, but their actual rankings were not, the average scores of the contestants are determined here for their ranks, following the international format stated in the show.

Celebrity	Notability	Professional partner	Status	Ref.
Aamir Ali	Bollywood and television actor	Sneha Singh	Eliminated 1st on 26 November 2023	
Urvashi Dholakia	Reality show alumnus and television actress	Vaibhav Ghuge	Eliminated 2nd on 3 December 2023	
Rajiv Thakur	Actor and comedian	Suchitra Sawant	Eliminated 3rd on 17 December 2023	
Vivek Dahiya	Television actor	Lipsa Acharya	Eliminated 4th on 24 December 2023	
Tanishaa Mukerji	Bollywood actress and reality show alumnus	Tarun Raj Nihalani	Eliminated 5th on 7 January 2024	
Nikhita Gandhi	Singer	Vipul Khandapal	Not Selected on 13 January 2024	
Awez Darbar	Social media personality	Vaishnavi Patil	Withdrew on 13 January 2024	
Glenn Saldanha	Radio jockey	Arundhati Garnaik	Eliminated 6th on 21 January 2024	
Anjali Anand	Bollywood and television actress	Danny Fernandez; Tarun Raj Nihalani (Week 10-12)	Eliminated 7th on 28 January 2024	
Sangeeta Phogat	Wrestler	Bharat Ghare	Eliminated 8th on 4 February 2024	
Karuna Pandey	Television actress	Vivek Chachere	Eliminated 9th on 11 February 2024	
Sagar Parekh	Television actor	Shivani Patel	Eliminated 10th on 17 February 2024	
Shiv Thakare	Reality show alumnus	Romsha Singh; Lipsa Acharya (Week 16)	Eliminated 11th on 24 February 2024	
Dhanashree Verma	Social media personality	Sagar Bora	Finalists on 2 March 2024	
Sreerama Chandra	Reality show alumnus and playback singer	Sonali Kar	Finalists on 2 March 2024	
Shoaib Ibrahim	Social media personality and television actor	Anuradha Iyengar	Runners-up on 2 March 2024	
Adrija Sinha	Bollywood actress	Akash Thapa; Tejas Verma (Week 9-11)	Runners-up on 2 March 2024	
Manisha Rani	Social media personality and reality show alumnus	Ashutosh Pawar	Winners on 2 March 2024	

=== Host and judges ===
On 14 October, it was announced that the season 3 runner-up, Gauahar Khan, and the season 5 2nd runner-up, Rithvik Dhanjani would host season 11.

Judges Farah Khan and Malaika Arora returned to the judging panel after seasons 10 and 2 respectively, along with Arshad Warsi. Marzi Pestonji served as a guest judge in week 6, during Farah Khan's absence.

=== Guest dance partners ===
In week 5, the couples were paired with a guest choreographer to perform a dance routine as a trio. Ruel Dausan Varindani, Nishant Bhatt, Vaishnavi Patil, Swetha Warrier, Sanam Johar, Tejas Verma, Ashish Patil, Paul Marshal, Deepak Singh and Shivani were the partners which includes ex-contestants, winners and runners-up as well.

=== Wild card entrants ===
Bigg Boss OTT (Hindi season 2) finalist Manisha Rani, social media influencer and YouTuber Awez Darbar, television actor Sagar Parekh, actress and dancer-choreographer Dhanashree Verma, singer Nikhita Gandhi and RJ Glenn Saldanha were announced as wildcards. Out of 6, 4 wildcards will get selected from combined results of judges' scores and public voting.

Awez Darbar won judges' choice and directly entered, however withdrew from the competition due to medical injury. Manisha Rani, Sagar Parekh, Glenn Saldanha and Dhanashree Verma entered as wildcards.

== Scoring chart ==
The highest score each week is indicated in bold green with a dagger (†), while the lowest score each week is indicated in italic red with a double-dagger (‡).

Last Chance to Dance scores are not given in this table as they are discarded.

Colour key:

Winners
Co-runners-up
Finalists
Bottom two
Eliminated
Withdrew from competition

Jhalak Dikhhla Jaa (season 11) - Weekly Scores
Couple	Pl.	Week																
Couple	Pl.	2	3	4	5	6	7	8 (Note: The professional partners were swapped for this week, scores mentioned are of the celebrity, full list is given below.)	7+8	9	10	11	12	13	14	15	16	17
Manisha & Ashutosh	1st									24‡ (Note: This couple was selected as wild card.)	27	26	**30**†	27	27+29=56	27+5=32	25+30=55 (Note: This couple finished in first place.)	
Shoaib & Anuradha	2nd	16‡	27	26	21‡	**30**†	27	**30**†	**57**†	**30**†	27	28	26	**30**†	24+29=53‡	25+10=35	30+26=56 (Note: This couple finished in second place.)	
Adrija & Akash	2nd	29	**30**†	**30**†	**30**†	**30**†	27	**30**†	**57**†	**30**†	29	29	**30**†	**30**†	30+29=**59**†	30+10=**40**†	25+30=55 (Note: This couple finished in second place.)	
Sreerama & Sonali	4th	27	27	27	28	27	**30**†	26	56	29	27	23‡ (Note: This couple was in the bottom two, and competed in dance-off the following week, but was not eliminated.)	26	27	27+30=57	30+10=**40**†	27+30=**57**† (Note: This couple was a finalist.)	
Dhanashree & Sagar B	4th									25	25	25	25	26	27+30=57	24+5=29‡	28+23=51‡	
Shiv & Romsha	6th	23	24	18‡	24	27	21‡	27	48‡	**30**†	24	28	21‡	24‡	24+30=54	26+5=31 (Note: This couple was eliminated after competing in dance-off the following week, in the results segment of this week.)		
Sagar P & Shivani	7th									25	20	28	29	24‡	26+29=55			
Karuna & Vivek	8th	**30**†	27	20	**30**†	28	27	25	52	28	19‡	**30**†	26	22				
Sangeeta & Bharat	9th	18	**30**†	24	27	24	**30**†	27	**57**†	**30**†	**30**†	27	24					
Anjali & Danny	10th	17	24	21	**30**†	28	21‡	28	49	28	**30**†	27						
Glenn & Arundhati	11th									27	24							
Awez & Vaishnavi	12th									27	(Note: This couple withdrew from the competition.)							
Nikhita & Vipul	—N/a									24‡ (Note: This couple was not selected as wild card.)								
Tanishaa & Tarun	13th	24	22	27	24	28	26	24‡	50									
Vivek D & Lipsa	14th	25	23	21	**30**†	23‡												
Rajiv & Suchitra	15th	21	17‡	28	23													
Urvashi & Vaibhav	16th	21	20															
Aamir & Sneha	17th	22																

== Weekly scores ==
Unless stated, individual judges' scores in the charts below are listed in following order from left to right: Malaika Arora, Arshad Warsi, Farah Khan.

The elimination and bottom two data given on the table is proportional to the Last Chance to Dance held next week during the result segment.

=== Week 1: Premiere ===
The couples performed a dance routine but were neither given scores nor the voting lines open. They are listed in the order which they performed.

Jhalak Dikhhla Jaa (season 11) - week 1
Couple	Scores	Dance	Music
Karuna and Vivek	No scores given	Garba and Dandiya Raas	"Dholida"
Anjali and Danny	No scores given	Fusion	"What Jhumka?"
Shoaib and Anuradha	No scores given	Bollywood	"Suraj Hua Maddham"
Sreerama and Sonali	No scores given	Hip-Hop	"Allah Duhai Hai"
Urvashi and Vaibhav	No scores given	Waacking and Salsa	"Yaar Naa Miley"
Aamir and Sneha	No scores given	Bollywood	"Mera Wala Dance"
Shiv and Romsha	No scores given	Freestyle	"Malhari"
Tanishaa and Tarun	No scores given	Tango	"Laila Main Laila"
Rajiv and Suchitra	No scores given	Freestyle	"Jhoome Jo Pathaan"
Sangeeta and Bharat	No scores given	Hip-Hop	"Malang"
Adrija and Akash	No scores given	Locking and Popping	"Dola Re Dola"
Vivek and Lipsa	No scores given	Contemporary	"Ramta Jogi"

=== Week 2: First competitive week ===
The couples are listed in the order they performed.

Jhalak Dikhhla Jaa (season 11) - week 2
Couple	Scores	Dance	Music	Results (26 November 2023)
Vivek and Lipsa	25 (9, 8, 8)	Contemporary and pole dance	"Har Kisi Ko"	Safe
Sreerama and Sonali	27 (9, 9, 9)	Freestyle	"Ye Kaali Kaali Aankhen"	Safe
Karuna and Vivek	30 (10, 10, 10)	Fire Kathak	"Silsila Ye Chaahat Ka"	Safe
Rajiv and Suchitra	21 (7, 8, 6)	Aerial bhangra	"Main Nikla Gaddi Leke"	Safe
Tanishaa and Tarun	24 (8, 8, 8)	Contemporary and acrobesia	"Hai Rama"	Safe
Shoaib and Anuradha	16 (6, 5, 5)	Bollywood	"Badan Pe Sitaare Lapete Huye"	Safe
Aamir and Sneha	22 (8, 7, 7)	Waltz	"Pehla Nasha"	Eliminated
Sangeeta and Bharat	18 (6, 6, 6)	Bollywood	"Chaiyya Chaiyya"	Safe
Shiv and Romsha	23 (8, 8, 7)	Bollywood and jive	"Naacho Naacho"	Safe
Adrija and Akash	29 (10, 10, 9)	Aerial and semi-classical	"Khoya Hain"	Safe
Anjali and Danny	17 (5, 6, 6)	Cha-cha-cha	"Yeh Ladka Hai Deewana"	Bottom two
Urvashi and Vaibhav	21 (7, 7, 7)	Bollywood	"Jaane Do Naa Paas Aao Na"	Safe

=== Week 3: Chartbuster songs night ===
The couples are listed in the order they performed.

Jhalak Dikhhla Jaa (season 11) - week 3
Couple	Scores	Dance	Music	Results (3 December 2023)
Sreerama and Sonali	27 (9, 9, 9)	Rock and Roll	"Bol Baby Bol"	Safe
Sangeeta and Bharat	30 (10, 10, 10)	Bollywood	"Hawa Hawaii"	Safe
Vivek and Lipsa	23 (8, 7, 8)	Bollywood	"Kaho Naa Pyaar Hai"	Safe
Shoaib and Anuradha	27 (9, 9, 9)	Bollywood	"Aap Ke Aa Jane Se"	Safe
Karuna and Vivek	27 (9, 9, 9)	Yakhsgaan and Bollywood	"Jhingat"	Safe
Urvashi and Vaibhav	20 (8, 6, 6)	Contemporary	"Do Dil Mil Rahe Hain"	Eliminated
Tanishaa and Tarun	22 (8, 7, 7 )	Kalbelia	"Choli Ke Peeche"	Bottom two
Shiv and Romsha	24 (9, 7, 8)	Bollywood & Hip-Hop	"Oonchi Hai Building"	Safe
Rajiv and Suchitra	17 (6, 6, 5)	Bollywood	"Naino Me Sapna"	Safe
Adrija and Akash	30 (10, 10, 10)	Chicago Footwork and Lyrical	"Mere Dholna"	Safe
Anjali & Danny	24	Semi-classical	"Kahin Aag Lage"	Safe

Last Chance to Dance (week 2 results)
Couple	Scores	Dance	Music	Result
Anjali & Danny	24	Semi-classical	"Kahin Aag Lage"	Winners
Aamir and Sneha	20	Bollywood & Hip-Hop	"One 2 Ka 4"	Losers

=== Week 4: Boney Kapoor special ===
The couples are listed in the order they performed.
Special Guest: Boney Kapoor

Jhalak Dikhhla Jaa (season 11) - week 4
Couple	Scores	Dance	Music	Results (10 December 2023)
Sangeeta & Bharat	24 (8, 8, 8)	Tollywood	"Mera Hi Jalwa"	Safe
Shoaib & Anuradha	26 (9, 8, 9)	Lyrical & Contemporary	"Kaate Nahi Kat Te"	Safe
Rajiv & Suchitra	28 (10, 9, 9)	Lavni	"Ishq Di Galli Vich - No Entry"	Safe
Sreerama & Sonali	27 (9, 9, 9)	Contemporary	"Sunta Hai Mera Khuda"	Safe
Karuna & Vivek	20 (7, 7, 6)	Bollywood	"Ae Zindagi Gale Laga Le"	Bottom two
Anjali & Danny	21 (8, 7, 6)	Bollywood	"Ishq Kameena"	Bottom two
Adrija & Akash	30 (10, 10, 10)	Salsa	"Kay Sera Sera"	Safe
Shiv & Romsha	18 (7, 6, 5)	Kathak & Bollywood	"Pyaar Hota Kayi Baar Hai"	Safe
Vivek & Lipsa	21 (7, 7, 7)	Bollywood	"Pehli Baa"	Safe
Tanishaa & Tarun	27 (9, 9, 9)	Aerial & Contemporary	"Joganiyan"	Safe

Last Chance to Dance (week 3 results)
Couple	Scores	Dance	Music	Result
Tanishaa & Tarun	27 (9, 9, 9)	Aerial & Contemporary	"Joganiyan"	Winners
Urvashi & Vaibhav	24 (8, 8, 8)	Bollywood	"Na Jaane Kahan Se"	Losers

=== Week 5: Meenakshi Seshadri special ===
The couples performed on the songs in which Meenakshi Seshadri had acted in the movies and are listed in the order they performed.
Special Guest: Meenakshi Seshadri

Jhalak Dikhhla Jaa (season 11) - week 5
Couple	Scores	Dance	Music	Results (17 December 2023)
Adrija & Akash	30 (10, 10, 10)	Indian Semi-classical	"Shiv Tandav Stotram (Har Har Shiv Shankar)"	Safe
Rajiv & Suchitra	23 (8, 7, 8)	Garba	"Main To Raste Se Ja Raha Tha"	Eliminated
Shiv & Romsha	24 (8, 8, 8)	Folk dance	"Maay Bhavani"	Safe
Tanishaa & Tarun	24 (8, 8, 8)	Contemporary	"Jab Koi Baat"	Bottom two
Shoaib & Anuradha	21 (7, 7, 7)	Contemporary	"Chura Ke Dil Mera"	Safe
Sangeeta & Bharat	27 (9, 9, 9)	Contemporary	"Ae Watan" & "Zindagi Ha Kadam Ek Nai Jung Hai"	Safe
Sreerama & Sonali	28 (10, 9, 9)	Street jazz	"Don't Say No"	Safe
Vivek & Lipsa	30 (10, 10, 10)	Bollywood	"Dhindhora Baje Re"	Safe
Karuna and Vivek	30 (10, 10, 10)	Bollywood & Pasodoble	"Koi Jaye To Le Aaye"	Safe
Anjali and Danny	30 (10, 10, 10)	Hip-Hop	"Hothon Pe Aisi Baat Main"	Safe

Last Chance to Dance (week 4 results)
Couple	Scores	Dance	Music	Result
Karuna and Vivek	30 (10, 10, 10)	Bollywood & Pasodoble	"Koi Jaye To Le Aaye"	Winners
Anjali and Danny	30 (10, 10, 10)	Hip-Hop	"Hothon Pe Aisi Baat Main"	Winners

=== Week 6: Teen Ka Tadka ===
Individual judges' scores in the charts below are listed in following order from left to right: Arshad Warsi, Malaika Arora, Marzi Pestonji.

Indian dancer and choreographer, Marzi Pestonji appeared as a guest judge in the absence of Farah Khan. Each couple performed a trio dance involving a professional partner. Couples are listed in the order they performed.

Jhalak Dikhhla Jaa (season 11) - week 6
Team	Trio dance partner	Scores	Dance	Music	Results (24 December 2023)
Anjlai & Danny	Ruel	28 (9, 9, 10)	Hip-Hop	"Phatela Jeb"	Safe
Shoaib & Anuradha	Nishant Bhatt	30 (10, 10, 10)	Contemporary	"Bheegi Bheegi"	Safe
Shiv & Romsha	Vaishnavi	27 (9, 9, 9)	Bollywood & Afro	"Saat Samundar Paar" & "Jungle Mein Kaand"	Safe
Sangeeta & Bharat	Shwetha Warrier	24 (8, 8, 8)	Bollywood	"Hanuman Chalisa (New)"	Bottom two
Vivek & Lipsa	Sanam Johar	23 (7, 8, 8)	Bollywood	"Make Some Noise For The Desi Boyz"	Eliminated
Adrija & Akash	Tejas Verma	30 (10, 10, 10)	Hip-Hop	"Pyaar Hua Ikraar Hua", "Mera Joota Hai Japani" & "Aa Jaa Sanam"	Safe
Karuna & Vivek	Ashish	28 (9, 9, 10)	Lavni	"Taal Se Taal Mila — Lavni Remix"	Safe
Sreerama & Sonali	Paul Marshal	27 (9, 9, 9)	Lyrical	"Premika Ne Pyar Se"	Safe
Tanishaa & Tarun	Deepak Singh	28 (9, 9, 10)	Pasodoble & Bollywood	"Ae Dil Hai Mushkil"	Safe

Last Chance to Dance (week 5 results)
Team	Scores	Dance	Music	Result
Rajiv, Suchitra & Shivani	25 (8, 8, 9)	Bollywood	"Aur Ho"	Losers
Tanishaa, Tarun & Deepak	28 (9, 9, 10)	Pasodoble & Bollywood	"Ae Dil Hai Mushkil"	Winners

=== Week 7: Wedding special ===
Special Guests: Archana Puran Singh and Parmeet Sethi

No elimination was held for this week. All the scores and votes were carried to the next week. The couples are listed in the order they performed.

Jhalak Dikhhla Jaa (season 11) - week 7
Couple	Scores	Dance	Music
Shoaib & Anuradha	27 (9, 9, 9)	Bollywood	"Yeh Ladka Hai Allah" & "Sajanji Ghar Aaye"
Sreerama & Sonali	30 (10, 10, 10)	Waltz	"Janam Janam"
Karuna and Vivek	27 (9, 9, 9)	Tollywood	"Saami Saami"
Anjali and Danny	21 (8, 7, 6)	Bollywood	"Ram Chahe Leela"
Shiv & Romsha	21 (8, 7, 6)	Bollywood & Hip-Hop	"Om Mangalam"
Tanishaa & Tarun	26 (9, 9, 8)	Indian contemporary	"Dilbaro"
Adrija & Akash	27 (9, 9, 9)	Lyrical	"Moh Moh Ke Dhaage"
Sangeeta & Bharat	30 (10, 10, 10)	Bollywood	"Sajna Ji Vari Vari"

Last Chance to Dance (week 7 results)
Couple	Scores	Dance	Music	Result
Sangeeta & Bharat	30 (10, 10, 10)	Bollywood	"Sajna Ji Vari Vari"	Winners
Vivek D & Lipsa	27 (9, 9, 9)	Indian contemporary	"Mera Naam Tu"	Losers

=== Week 8: Adla-badli ===
The professional partners were swapped for each celebrity this week. In the second episode of the week, all the couples performed a freestyle and Bollywood dance together, in celebration of New Year's Eve.

Guest performers: Pawandeep Rajan, Arunita Kanjilal, Mohd Danish, Sayli Kamble and Salman Ali

The couples are listed in the order they performed.

Jhalak Dikhhla Jaa (season 11) - Week 8
Couple	Scores	Dance	Music	Results (7 January 2024)
Adrija & Bharat	30 (10, 10, 10)	Jogwa	"Lallati Bhandar"	Safe
Karuna and Tarun	25 (8, 8, 9)	Latin & Cabaret	"Piya Tu Ab To Aja", "Yeh Mera Dil" & "Saat Samundar Paar"	Bottom two
Shiv & Anuradha	27 (9, 9, 9)	Contemporary	"Pehle Bhi Main"	Safe
Sreerama & Akash	26 (9, 8, 9)	Voguing & Wacking	"Humma Humma"	Safe
Shoaib & Sonali	30 (10, 10, 10)	Bollywood	"Lahu Munh Lag Gaya"	Safe
Anjali & Romsha	28 (10, 9, 9)	Jazz Funk	"Garmi"	Safe
Sangeeta & Vivek	27 (9, 9, 9)	Bollywood	"Chikni Chameli"	Safe
Tanishaa & Danny	24 (8, 8, 8)	Jive & Lindy Hop	"Gori Gori", "Chin Chin Chu" & "Eena Meena Deeka"	Eliminated

=== Week 9 ===
==== Night 1: Wild Card Challengers ====
This night introduced the 6 wild-card contestants, from which only 4 will be selected to compete in the main competition: one by the sole decision of the judges and the other 3 through a combination of judges' and audience votes. However, due to Darbar's withdrawal, 4 wildcards will be selected based on combined judges' and public votes.

The couples are listed in the order they performed.

Jhalak Dikhhla Jaa (season 11) - Wild cards
Couple	Scores	Dance	Music	Results
Awez & Vaishnavi	27 (9, 9, 9)	Bollywood & Hip-Hop	"Aala Re Aala"	Safe (Judges' Wildcard)
Awez & Vaishnavi	27 (9, 9, 9)	Bollywood & Hip-Hop	"Aala Re Aala"	Withdrew
Manisha & Ashutosh	24 (8, 8, 8)	Bollywood	"Munni Badnaam Hui"	Safe (Wildcard)
Sagar & Shivani	25 (8, 9, 8)	Bollywood	"Deva Shree Ganesha"	Safe (Wildcard)
Dhanashree & Sagar	25 (9, 8, 8)	Bollywood & Hip-Hop	"Crazy Kiya Re"	Bottom two (Wildcard)
Nikhita & Vipul	24 (8, 8, 8)	Bollywood	"Raabta" & "Do You Love Me"	Eliminated (Not selected)
Glenn & Arundhati	27 (9, 9, 9)	Freestyle & Contemporary	"Hua Main"	Safe (Wildcard)

==== Night 2: Char ka Vaar ====
The 8 couples performed their dance routines in pairs on this night. No eliminations were carried out the following week due to Darbar's withdrawal from the show.

The couples are listed in the order they performed.

Jhalak Dikhhla Jaa (season 11) - Week 9
Couple	Scores	Dance	Music
Sreerama & Sonali	29 (10, 10, 9)	Freestyle & Tandav	"Bolo Har Har Har"
Tanishaa & Tarun	29 (10, 10, 9)	Freestyle & Tandav	"Bolo Har Har Har"
Adrija & Tejas	30 (10, 10, 10)	Bollywood	"Tunak Tunak Tun"
Sangeeta & Bharat	30 (10, 10, 10)	Bollywood	"Tunak Tunak Tun"
Shoaib & Anuradha	30 (10, 10, 10)	Bollywood	"Hum Toh Hain Cappuccino (U.P. Bihar Lootne)"
Shiv & Romsha	30 (10, 10, 10)	Bollywood	"Hum Toh Hain Cappuccino (U.P. Bihar Lootne)"
Karuna and Vivek	28 (9, 10, 9)	Bollywood	"Chamma Chamma"
Anjali and Danny	28 (9, 10, 9)	Bollywood	"Chamma Chamma"

Last Chance to Dance (Weeks 7+8 Results)
Couple	Scores	Dance	Music	Result
Karuna & Vivek	28 (9, 10, 9)	Kathak & Bollywood	"Morey Piya"	Winners
Tanishaa & Tarun	26 (8, 9, 9)	Bollywood & Latin	"Babuji Zara Dheere Chalo"	Losers

=== Week 10: Raveena Tandon Special ===
Special Guest: Raveena Tandon

During this week's rehearsals, the judges' wildcard, Awez Darbar, sustained an injury to his right knee, resulting in a Grade 3 MCL tear. Following the doctors' advice, he decided to withdraw from the competition.

The couples are listed in the order they performed.

Jhalak Dikhhla Jaa (season 11) - Week 10
Couple	Scores	Dance	Music	Results (21 January 2024)
Sreerama & Sonali	27 (9, 9, 9)	Tango	"Aaja Gufaon Mein Aa"	Safe
Sangeeta & Bharat	30 (10, 10, 10)	Bollywood & Contemporary	"Ye Raat"	Safe
Shoaib & Anuradha	27 (9, 9, 9)	Bollywood	"Tu Cheez Badi Hai Mast", "Aankh Maarey" & "Dil Karta Hai Tere Paas Aaun"	Safe
Sagar & Shivani	20 (7, 7, 6)	Bollywood	"Main Laila Laila"	Safe
Glenn & Arundhati	24 (8, 8, 8)	Bollywood & Salsa	"Sheher Ki Ladki"	Eliminated
Karuna and Vivek	19 (6, 7, 6)	Bollywood	"Rabba Rabba"	Bottom two
Adrija & Tejas	29 (9, 10, 10)	New-school Hip-Hop	"Kabhi Tu Chhalia Lagta Hai"	Safe
Shiv & Romsha	24 (8, 8, 8)	Bollywood	"Ehsaas Nahi Tujhko Main Pyar Karu Kitna"	Safe
Manisha & Ashutosh	27 (9, 9, 9)	Bollywood	"Tip Tip Barsa Pani"	Safe
Anjali and Tarun	30 (10, 10, 10)	Semi-classical	"Nain Se Naino Ko Mila"	Safe
Dhanashree & Sagar	25 (8, 9, 8)	Hip-Hop	"Tumse Jo Dekhte Hi Pyar Hua"	Safe

Last Chance to Dance (Wildcard Results)
Couple	Scores	Dance	Music	Result
Dhanashree & Sagar	25 (8, 9, 8)	Hip-Hop	"Tumse Jo Dekhte Hi Pyar Hua"	Winners
Nikhita & Vipul	22 (7, 8, 7)	Bollywood	"Ankhiyon Se Goli Mare"	Losers

=== Week 11: Race to Finale ===
The couples are listed in the order they performed.

Jhalak Dikhhla Jaa (season 11) - Week 11
Couple	Scores	Dance	Music	Results (28 January 2024)
Adrija & Tejas	29 (10, 10, 9)	Chicago footwork & Hip-Hop	"Bumbro"	Safe
Shoaib & Anuradha	28 (9, 9, 10)	Contemporary & Lyrical	"Lag Jaa Gale Instrumental"	Safe
Anjali and Tarun	27 (9, 9, 9)	Belly dancing & Vogue	"San Sanana"	Eliminated
Dhanashree & Sagar	25 (8, 9, 8)	Bollywood	"Sheila Ki Jawani"	Safe
Sagar P & Shivani	28 (9, 9, 10)	Hip-Hop & Stomping	"Bulleya (Indian version)"	Safe
Shiv & Romsha	28 (9, 9, 10)	Freestyle	"Jai Shree Ram"	Safe
Manisha & Ashutosh	26 (9, 9, 8)	Koli & Bollywood	"Mala Jau De"	Safe
Sreerama & Sonali	23 (8, 8, 7)	Kathakali	"Current Laga Re"	Bottom two
Sangeeta & Bharat	27 (9, 9, 9)	Contemporary	"Duaa"	Safe
Karuna and Vivek	30 (10, 10, 10)	Semi-classical	"Aigiri Nandini"—Sachet–Parampara	Safe

Last Chance to Dance (Week 10 Results)
Couple	Scores	Dance	Music	Result
Karuna and Vivek	30 (10, 10, 10)	Semi-classical	"Aigiri Nandini"—Sachet–Parampara	Winners
Glenn & Arundhati	22 (7, 8, 7)	Latin & Bollywood	"Bheegi Bheegi Raaton Mein"	Losers

=== Week 12: Mahasangam ka Mahasangram ===
The professional partners did not perform this week. Two celebrities were paired with each other to perform a dance routine and are listed in the order they performed.

Jhalak Dikhhla Jaa (season 11) - Week 12
Celebrity	Scores	Dance	Music	Results (4 February 2024)
Shoaib	26 (9, 8, 9)	Bollywood	"Gerua"	Safe
Dhanashree	25 (8, 9, 8)	Bollywood	"Gerua"	Safe
Adrija	30 (10, 10, 10)	Odissi & Bollywood	"Jimmy Jimmy Aaja"	Safe
Manisha	30 (10, 10, 10)	Odissi & Bollywood	"Jimmy Jimmy Aaja"	Safe
Karuna	26 (9, 8, 9)	Sufi & Bollywood	"Bhar Do Jholi Meri Ya Muhammad"	Safe
Sagar P	29 (10, 9, 10)	Sufi & Bollywood	"Bhar Do Jholi Meri Ya Muhammad"	Bottom two
Shiv	21 (7, 7, 7)	Bollywood, Bhangra & Afro	"Jaan Lelo Na Jaan Re"	Safe
Sangeeta	24 (8, 8, 8)	Bollywood, Bhangra & Afro	"Jaan Lelo Na Jaan Re"	Eliminated
Anjali	24 (8, 8, 8)	Tollywood	"One Two Three Four"	—N/a
Sreerama	26 (8, 8, 9)	Tollywood	"One Two Three Four"	Safe

Last Chance to Dance (Week 11 Results)
Couple	Scores	Dance	Music	Result
Sreerama & Sonali	30 (10, 10, 10)	Bollywood & Latin	"Bang Bang"	Winners
Anjali & Tarun	23 (8, 8, 7)	Bollywood	"Mardaani Anthem"	Losers

=== Week 13: The Grand Costume Party & Jashn-e-Juhi ===
Special Guest: Juhi Chawala
The couples performed on the songs in which Juhi Chawala had acted in movies and are listed in the order they performed.

Jhalak Dikhhla Jaa (season 11) - Week 13
Couple	Scores	Dance	Music	Results (11 February 2024)
Sreerama & Sonali	27 (9, 9, 9)	Latin & Hip-Hop	"Neend Churayi Meri"	Safe
Shoaib & Anuradha	30 (10, 10, 10)	Contemporary	"Tu Hai Meri Kiran"	Safe
Dhanashree & Sagar B	26 (9, 9, 8)	Bollywood & Jazz	"I'm The Best"	Safe
Shiv & Romsha	24 (8, 8, 8)	Contemporary	"Tu Mere Saamne"	Safe
Adrija & Akash	30 (10, 10, 10)	Lyrical	"Aye Mere Humsafar"	Safe
Manisha & Ashutosh	27 (9, 9, 9)	Robotics & Animation	"Agar Tum Kaho"	Safe
Sagar P & Shivani	24 (8, 8, 8)	Aerial & Contemporary	"Khamoshiyan Gungunane Lagi"	Bottom two
Karuna & Vivek	22 (7, 8, 7)	Bollywood	"Roop Suhana Lagta Hai"	Eliminated

Last Chance to Dance (Week 12 Results)
Couple	Scores	Dance	Music	Result
Sagar P & Shivani	24 (8, 8, 8)	Aerial & Contemporary	"Khamoshiyan Gungunane Lagi"	Winners
Sangeeta & Bharat	21 (7, 7, 7)	Bollywood	"Tu Tu Tu Tu Tara"	Losers

=== Week 14: Love Special ===
Special Guests: Kriti Sanon, Shahid Kapoor and Jaaved Jaaferi
Each couple performed one unlearned dance and participated in a team dance on the songs in which Shahid Kapoor had acted in movies. The couples are listed in the order they performed.

Jhalak Dikhhla Jaa (season 11) - Week 14
Couple	Scores	Dance	Music	Results (17 February 2024)
Shiv & Romsha	24 (8, 8, 8)	Bollywood, Jazz & Aerial	"Gustakh Dil Tere Liye"	Bottom two
Shoaib & Anuradha	24 (8, 8, 8)	Bollywood	"Saree Ke Fall Sa"	Safe
Dhanashree & Sagar B	27 (9, 9, 9)	Lyrical	"Apna Bana Le"	Safe
Sreerama & Sonali	27 (9, 9, 9)	Bollywood	"Roshni Se"	Safe
Sagar P & Shivani	26 (9, 8, 9)	Semi-classical	"Wo Kisna Hai" & "Kaise Hua"	Eliminated
Adrija & Akash	30 (10, 10, 10)	Locking & Popping	"Laal Peeli Akhiyaan"	Safe
Manisha & Ashutosh	27 (9, 9, 9)	Contemporary	"Bekhayali"	Safe
Shiv & Romsha Dhanashree & Sagar B Sreerama & Sonali Karuna & Vivek	30 (10, 10, 10)	Bollywood & Afro (Team Manav)	"Khali Wali"	
Adrija & Akash Shoaib & Anuradha Sagar P & Shivani Manisha & Asutosh	29 (10, 10, 9)	Bollywood (Team Adi)	"Go Go Golmaal"	

Last Chance to Dance (Week 13 Results)
Couple	Scores	Dance	Music	Result
Sagar P & Shivani	26 (9, 8, 9)	Semi-classical	"Wo Kisna Hai" & "Kaise Hua"	Winners
Karuna & Vivek	25 (8, 9, 8)	Bollywood	"Dhating Naach"	Losers

=== Week 15: Rishton ka Jalsa ===
The couples performed with their family members this week. For those whose family members could not dance, they portrayed a special role in the performance only. The couples are listed in the order they performed.

The couple's also performed in a dance-off in separate routines and numbers. The winner received 10 bonus points while the loser received 5 bonus points.

Jhalak Dikhhla Jaa (season 11) - Week 15
Couple	Scores	Dance	Music	Results (24 February 2024)
Sreerama & Sonali	30 (10, 10, 10)	Contemporary	"Main Jahaan Rahoon"	Safe
Shiv & Romsha	26 (9, 9, 8)	Contemporary	"Papa Meri Jaan"	Eliminated
Shoaib & Anuradha	25 (8, 8, 9)	Contemporary	"Tu Jo Mila"	Safe
Adrija & Akash	30 (10, 10, 10)	Hip-Hop	"Maston Ka Jhund"	Safe
Manisha & Ashutosh	27 (9, 9, 9)	Contemporary	"Kitni Baatein"	Safe
Dhanashree & Sagar B	24 (8, 8, 8)	Lyrical & Hip-Hop	"Milegi Milegi"	Bottom two

Last Chance to Dance (Week 14 Results)
Couple	Scores	Dance	Music	Result
Shiv & Romsha	26 (9, 9, 8)	Contemporary	"Papa Meri Jaan"	Winners
Sagar P & Shivani	23 (8, 8, 7)	Contemporary & Garba	"Kar Har Maidaan Fateh"	Losers

Dance-offs
Couple	Dance	Music	Result
Shoaib & Anuradha	Bollywood	"Khalibali"	Winners
Manisha & Ashutosh	Bollywood	"O Saki Saki"	Losers
Shiv & Romsha	Bollywood	"Shankara Re Shankara"	Losers
Adrija & Akash	Bollywood & Hip-Hop	"Nach Baliye"	Winners
Dhanashree & Sagar B	Bollywood	"Nagada Sang Dhol"	Losers
Sreerama & Sonali	Hip-Hop	"Hairat"	Winners

=== Week 16: Semi-finals ===
The scores given this week were carried forward to the finale.

The couple's performed two dance routines this week and are listed in the order of their first routine.

Jhalak Dikhhla Jaa (season 11) - Week 16
Couple	Scores	Dance	Music
Manisha & Ashutosh	25 (9, 8, 8)	Belly dancing & Bollywood	"Mayya"
Manisha & Ashutosh	30 (10, 10, 10)	Contemporary	"Main Agar Kahoon"
Sreerama & Sonali	27 (9, 9, 9)	Afro & Latin	"Dance Meri Rani"
Sreerama & Sonali	30 (10, 10, 10)	Old-school Hip hop & Disco	"Sher Khul Gaye" & "Pag Ghungroo Bandh"
Adrija & Akash	25 (8, 9, 8)	Lyrical	"Ban Ja Rani"
Adrija & Akash	30 (10, 10, 10)	Latin, Semi-classical, Afro, Hip hop, Tap dance & Robotics	"Aplam Chaplam Chaplayee Re"
Shoaib & Anuradha	30 (10, 10, 10)	Bollywood & Paso doble	"Satrangi Re"
Shoaib & Anuradha	26 (8, 9, 9)	Contemporary	"Maa Tujhe Salaam"
Dhanashree & Sagar B	28 (9, 10, 9)	Contemporary	"Tanhayee"
Dhanashree & Sagar B	23 (8, 8, 7)	Tollywood and Bhangra	"Lungi Dance"

Last Chance to Dance (Week 15 Results)
Couple	Scores	Dance	Music	Result
Dhanashree & Sagar B	28 (9, 10, 9)	Contemporary	"Tanhayee"	Winners
Shiv & Lipsa	24 (8, 8, 8)	Bollywood	"Tattad Tattad"	Losers

=== Week 17: The Great Grand Finale ===
The results were announced considering the scores and votes of the semi-final week. There was no specific declaration of runners-up, instead Top 3 were announced among Top 5, and the winner was announced from Top 3. The couples performed along with the back dancers and are listed in the order of their first performance. In the second performance, they performed a dance relay and were given no scores in either of the performances.

Jhalak Dikhhla Jaa (season 11) - Week 17
Couple	Scores	Dance	Music	Results
Manisha & Ashutosh	No scores given	Freestyle	"Thumkeshwari", "Do You Love Me", "Param Sundari" and "Saami Saami"	Winners
Manisha & Ashutosh	No scores given	Freestyle	"Psycho Saiyaan"	Winners
Adrija & Akash	No scores given	Freestyle	"Nadiyon Paar", "Chammak Challo" and "Move Your Body"	Runners-up
Adrija & Akash	No scores given	Freestyle	"Man Mohini"	Runners-up
Sreerama & Sonali	No scores given	Freestyle	"Subhanallah", "Chaleya" and "Haan Main Galat"	Finalist
Sreerama & Sonali	No scores given	Freestyle	"Jashn-e-Ishqa"	Finalist
Shoaib & Anuradha	No scores given	Freestyle	"Baadshah, O Baadshah" and "Zinda Banda"	Runners-up
Shoaib & Anuradha	No scores given	Freestyle	"Dil Mein Baji Guitar"	Runners-up
Dhanashree & Sagar B	No scores given	Freestyle	"Apsara Aali", "Manike" and "Dhoom Machale Dhoom"	Finalist
Dhanashree & Sagar B	No scores given	Freestyle	"Aisa Jaadu Dala Re"	Finalist

== Dance chart ==
The couples performed the following each week:

- Weeks 1–13: One dance routine
- Week 14: One dance routine & team dance
- Week 15: One dance routine & dance-offs
- Week 16 (Semi-finals): Two dance routines
- Week 17 (Finals): One dance routine & dance relay

Jhalak Dikhhla Jaa (season 11) - Dance chart
Couple	Week (Note: Dance forms were allowed to be repeated but with a different concept.)																				
Couple	1	2	3	4	5	6	7	8	9	10	11	12	13	14		15		16		17	
Manisha & Ashutosh									Bolly.	Bolly.	Koli & Bolly.	Odissi & Bolly.	Robotics & Animation	Contemp.	Team Bolly.	Contemp.	Bolly.	Belly dancing & Bolly.	Contemp.	Freestyle (Note: No scores were received for this dance.)	Freestyle Relay
Shoaib and Anuradha	Bolly.	Bolly.	Bolly.	Lyrical & Contemp.	Contemp.	Contemp.	Bolly.	Bolly.	Bolly.	Bolly.	Contemp. & Lyrical	Bolly.	Contemp.	Bolly.	Team Bolly.	Contemp.	Bolly.	Bolly. & Paso doble	Contemp.	Freestyle	Freestyle Relay
Adrija and Akash	Locking and Popping	Aerial & Semi-classical	Chicago footwork and Lyrical	Salsa	Indian Semi-classical	Hip-Hop	Lyrical	Jogwa	Bolly.	New-school Hip-Hop	Chicago footwork & Hip-Hop	Odissi & Bolly.	Lyrical	Locking & Popping	Team Bolly.	Hip-Hop	Bolly. & Hip hop	Lyrical	Latin, Afro, Tap dance, Robotics & Semi-classical	Freestyle	Freestyle Relay
Sreerama and Sonali	Hip-Hop	Freestyle	Rock & Roll	Contemp.	Street jazz	Lyrical	Waltz	Voguing & Wacking	Freestyle & Tandav	Tango	Kathakali	Tollywood	Latin & Hip-Hop	Bolly.	Team Bolly. & Afro	Contemp.	Hip-Hop	Afro & Latin	Old school hip hop & Disco	Freestyle	Freestyle Relay
Dhanashree & Sagar B									Bolly. & Hip-Hop	Hip-Hop	Bolly.	Bolly.	Bolly. & Jazz	Lyrical	Team Bolly. & Afro	Lyrical & Hip-Hop	Bolly.	Contemp.	Tollywood & Bhangra	Freestyle	Freestyle Relay
Shiv and Romsha	Freestyle	Bolly. & Jive	Bolly. and Hip-Hop	Kathak & Bolly.	Folk dance	Bolly. & Afro	Bolly. & Hip-Hop	Contemp.	Bolly.	Bolly.	Freestyle	Bolly., Bhangra & Afro	Contemp.	Bolly., Jazz & Aerial	Team Bolly. & Afro	Contemp.	Bolly.	Bolly.			
Sagar P & Shivani									Bolly.	Bolly.	Hip-Hop & Stomping	Sufi & Bolly.	Aerial & Contemp.	Semi-classical	Team Bolly.	Contemp. & Garba				Group Freestyle	
Karuna and Vivek	Garba & Dandiya Raas	Fire Kathak	Yakhsgaan and Bolly.	Bolly.	Bolly. & Paso doble	Lavni	Tollywood	Latin & Cabaret	Bolly.	Bolly.	Semi-classical	Sufi & Bolly.	Bolly.	Bolly.	Team Bolly. & Afro					Group Freestyle	
Sangeeta and Bharat	Hip hop	Bolly.	Bolly.	Tollywood	Contemp.	Bolly.	Bolly.	Bolly.	Bolly.	Bolly. & Contemp.	Contemp.	Bolly., Bhangra & Afro	Bolly.							Group Freestyle	
Anjali and Danny	Fusion	Cha-cha-cha	Semi-classical	Bolly.	Hip-Hop	Hip-Hop	Bolly.	Jazz Funk	Bolly.	Semi-classical	Belly dancing & Vogue	Tollywood; Bolly.								Group Freestyle	
Glenn & Arundhati									Freestyle & Contemp.	Bolly. & Salsa	Latin & Bolly.										
Nikhita & Vipul									Bolly.	Bolly.											
Awez & Vaishnavi									Bolly. & Hip-Hop												
Tanishaa and Tarun	Tango	Contemp. & Acrobesia	Kalbelia	Aerial & Contemp.	Contemp.	Pasodoble & Bolly.	Indian Contemp.	Jive & Lindy Hop	Freestyle & Tandav; Bolly. & Latin											Group Freestyle	
Vivek D and Lipsa	Contemp.	Contemp. and Pole Dance	Bolly.	Bolly.	Bolly.	Bolly.	Indian Contemp.														
Rajiv and Suchitra	Freestyle	Aerial Bhangra	Bolly.	Lavni	Garba	Bolly.														Group Freestyle	
Urvashi and Vaibhav	Waacking & Salsa	Bolly.	Contemp.	Bolly.																	
Aamir and Sneha	Bolly.	Waltz	Bolly. and Hip-Hop																		

== Production ==
On 18 September 2023, the season was announced by Sony Entertainment Television, marking its return to the channel after a twelve-year hiatus. The series had been scrapped previously by Colors TV due to low TRPs. Gauahar Khan and Rithvik Dhanjani joined as hosts, alongside Arshad Warsi, Farah Khan and Malaika Arora on the judging panel. Principal photography of the series commenced in October 2023 in Mumbai.

== Guest appearances ==
Week(s)	Episode(s)	Guest(s)	Note(s)
Week 1	Episode 1	Dipika Kakar	To support her husband Shoaib Ibrahim
Week 1	Episode 2	Kiku Sharda	To entertain and support his friend Rajiv Thakur
Week 1	Episode 2	Geeta Phogat	To support her sister Sangeeta Phogat
Week 1	Episode 2	Karan Johar	Special appearance
Week 2	Episode 3	Divyanka Tripathi Dahiya	To support her husband Vivek Dahiya
Week 2	Episode 4	Meiyang Chang	To support his friend Anjali Anand
Week 3	Episode 7-8	Boney Kapoor	As a special guest for 'Boney Kapoor Special'
Week 5	Episode 9-10	Meenakshi Seshadri	As a special guest for 'Meenakshi Seshadri Special'
Week 5	Episode 10	Meenakshi Seshadri	As a special guest for 'Meenakshi Seshadri Special'
Week 5	Episode 10	Bajrang Punia	To support his wife Sangeeta Phogat
Week 6	Episode 11-12	Marzi Pestonji	Guest judge, to take the place of Farah Khan
Week 6	Episode 12	Marzi Pestonji	Guest judge, to take the place of Farah Khan
Week 6	Episode 12	Aarti Thakur	To support her husband Rajiv Thakur
Week 7	Episode 13-14	Archana Puran Singh and Parmeet Sethi	As special guests for 'Wedding Special'
Week 7	Episode 13	Zaid Darbar	To surprise his wife Gauahar Khan and celebrate their wedding anniversary
Week 7	Episode 14	Divyanka Tripathi Dahiya	To support her husband Vivek Dahiya and remarriage
Week 8	Episode 15	Bhoomi Trivedi	To support her friend Sreerama Chandra
Week 10	Episode 19-20	Raveena Tandon	As a special guest for 'Raveena Tandon Special'
Week 10	Episode 20	Raveena Tandon	As a special guest for 'Raveena Tandon Special'
Week 10	Episode 20	Yuzvendra Chahal	To support his wife Dhanashree Verma
Week 11	Episode 21	Aoora	To support Adrija Sinha
Week 11	Episode 21	Saba Ibrahim	To support her brother Shoaib Ibrahim
Week 11	Episode 21	Babil Khan and Jasleen Royal	To promote their song Dastoor
Week 11	Episode 22	Prince Narula	To support his best friend Shiv Thakare
Week 11	Episode 22	Faisal Shaikh	To support his friend Manisha Rani
Week 11	Episode 22	Karan Mehra and Shruti Anand	To promote their show Mehndi Wala Ghar
Week 11	Episode 22	Sumedh Shinde	To support his friend Glenn Saldanha
Week 13	Episode 24-25	Juhi Chawla	As a special guest for 'Jashn-e-Juhi'
Week 14	Episode 26-27	Shahid Kapoor and Kriti Sanon	To promote their film Teri Baaton Mein Aisa Uljha Jiya
Week 14	Episode 26-27	Jaaved Jaaferi	Special guest
Week 15	Episode 29	Vidyut Jammwal, Arjun Rampal, Nora Fatehi and Amy Jackson	To promote their film Crakk
Week 16	Episode 30	Guru Randhawa and Saiee Manjrekar	To promote their film Kuch Khattaa Ho Jaay
Week 16	Episode 31	Paritosh Tripathi, Kettan Singh, Ankita Shrivastav and Gaurav Dubey	To promote their show Madness Machayenge India Ko Hasayenge
Week 17	Episode 32	Sara Ali Khan, Vijay Varma and Sanjay Kapoor	To promote their film Murder Mubarak
Week 17	Episode 32-33	Huma Qureshi, Harsh Gujral and Inder Sahani	To promote their show Madness Machayenge India Ko Hasayenge
