= Manisha Rani =

Indian actress and social media personality (born 1997)

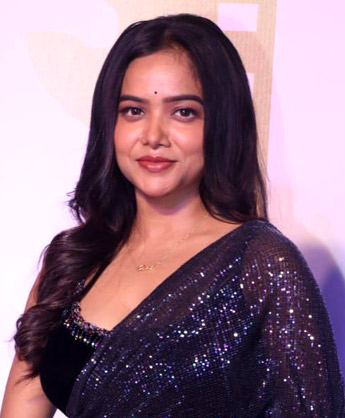
- Rani in 2024
- Born: 9 June 1997 (age 29); Munger, Bihar, India
- Occupations: Actress, Social media personality

YouTube information
- Channel: Manisha Rani
- Years active: 2017–present
- Genres: Comedy; Entertainment; Vlogs
- Subscribers: 4.49 million
- Views: 2.27 billion

Manisha Rani (born on 9 June 1997) is an Indian actress and social media personality. She participated in the reality show Bigg Boss OTT Season 2 in 2023 where she finished as 2nd runner-up. In 2024. Previously she participated in the dance-reality show Jhalak Dikhhla Jaa 11 as a wild-card contestant and emerged as the winner of the season.

== Early life ==
Manisha was born in a middle-class family in the Munger District of Bihar to her father Manoj Kumar Chandi and mother Ragini Devi. In an interview, Manisha Rani revealed that her parents were separated when she was 8 years old and she along with her four siblings was raised by her father alone.

Manisha Rani completed her education from her hometown in Munger and then she ran away from Bihar to Kolkata to learn dancing. In Kolkata, she took various jobs like working as a waitress and background dancer.

== Career ==
Manisha Rani first appeared on Indian Television in a dance reality show Dance India Dance Season 5 where she was evicted in the first round itself. After that, she did a small role in the &TV serial Gudiya Hamari Sabhi Pe Bhari in 2020.

In 2023, after almost 9 years of struggle, Manisha Rani participated in the reality show Bigg Boss OTT Season 2 where she finished as the 2nd runner-up. In 2024, she participated in Jhalak Dikhhla Jaa 11 as a wild-card contestant and emerged as the winner of the season.

In 2025, Manisha Rani made her acting debut as the lead female protagonist in the Indian web drama series Haale Dil, streamed on the YouTube channel Dreamiyata Drama. She portrayed the main character "Indu", a strong and emotionally driven role that marked her transition into full-time acting.

In September 2025, she hosted the reality game show The Treasure Hunters on JioHotstar alongside Scout OP. The series, described as the first of its kind in India, featured popular digital creators competing in a treasure-hunt format.

In September 2025, following the exit of Pawan Singh from the reality program Rise and Fall, the producers introduced Manisha Rani as a wild card contestant, where she finished at 7th place.

== Filmography ==
=== Television ===
Year	Title	Role	Notes	Ref.
2020	Gudiya Hamari Sabhi Pe Bhari	Manisha	Guest appearance	
2023	Bigg Boss OTT 2	Contestant	2nd Runner-Up	
2024	Jhalak Dikhhla Jaa 11	Contestant	Winner	
2024	India’s Best Dancer vs Super Dancer: Champions Ka Tashan	Manisha Rani	Guest appearance	
2025	Hip Hop India Season 2	Manisha Rani	Host	
2025	The Treasure Hunters	Manisha Rani	Host	
2025	Rise and Fall	Contestant	Evicted; 7th Place	
2026	The 50	Contestant		
2026	Maa Hai Na	Contestant		
2026	Bhojpuri Bawaal	Herself	Guest appearance	

=== Web series ===
Year	Title	Role	Ref.
2025	Haale Dil	Indu	

=== Music videos ===
Year	Title	Singer(s)	Ref.
2022	Sath	B Paras	
2023	Tinkiya	Akshara Singh	
2023	Jamna Paar	Tony Kakkar, Neha Kakkar	
2023	Tu Duniya Meri	Tony Kakkar	
2023	Nazar Na Lage	Payal Dev	
2023	Bolero	Preetinder, Asees Kaur	
2023	Baarish Ke Aane Se	Shreya Ghoshal, Tony Kakkar	
2024	Bairan Begani	Renuka Panwar, Nit-C	
2025	Holiya Mein Ude Re Gulal	Nikhita Gandhi, Romy, Ila Arjun, Lijo George	
