= Rebel (2015 film) =

- Directed by: Rajendra Singh Babu
- Screenplay by: Rajendra Singh Babu
- Story by: R. Selvaraj
- Produced by: Aadithya
- Starring: Aditya; Preetika Rao; Sanjjana; Suhasini Maniratnam
- Cinematography: Vamshi Krishna Prakash
- Edited by: T. Govardhan
- Music by: Jassie Gift
- Production company: Mysore Dream Merchants
- Release date: 8 May 2015
- Country: India
- Language: Kannada

Rebel is a 2015 Indian Kannada-language action film directed by Rajendra Singh Babu and starring Aditya, Preetika Rao, Sanjjana, and Suhasini Maniratnam.

== Cast ==
- Aditya as Karthik
- Preetika Rao as Preetika
- Sanjjana as Laila
- Suhasini Maniratnam as Anupama
- Shawar Ali as Shawar Ali
- Sharath Lohitashwa as Rana
- Sadhu Kokila
- Ramakrishna
- Sudharani

== Production ==
The film began production in 2011, but the film was delayed and news of the film later resurfaced. Aditya plays an NSG commando and trained with real commandoes to prepare for the film. This was the second collaboration between Rajendra Singh Babu and Aditya after Love (2004).

== Reception ==
A critic from Bangalore Mirror wrote that "It is not only the narration that is patchy, even the technical standards are like a B Grade film. There are many scenes that seem to have been shot on a cheap mobile phone and are pixelated on the big screen". A critic from The Times of India wrote that "The plot, if we are to call it that, is like a jigsaw puzzle made of dough. Malleable, it twists and turns according to the whims of the makers, in order to accommodate every little character in every other frame". A critic from The Hindu wrote that "There are some films that are so bad that they are fun to watch. And then there is a film like S.V. Rajendra Singh Babu’s Rebel which does not fall even into that category".
