= Haale Dil =

- Genre: Melodrama; Romance; Drama
- Created by: Ravi Dubey; Sargun Mehta
- Written by: Romit Ojha
- Directed by: Jai Basantu Singh
- Creative director: Shweta Mishra
- Starring: Manisha Rani; Nishank Verma; Harshad Arora; Jennifer Emannuel
- Theme music composer: Ripul Sharma & George Joseph
- Country of origin: India
- Original language: Hindi
- No. of seasons: 1
- No. of episodes: 50

Production
- Executive producers: Srman Jain; Preet Rajput
- Producers: Ravi Dubey; Sargun Mehta
- Editors: Dharmesh Patel; Shadab Khan; Kamal Bhatrai
- Camera setup: Multi-camera
- Running time: 22–38 minutes
- Production company: Dreamiyata Entertainment

Original release
- Network: YouTube
- Release: 6 June – 24 November 2025

Haale Dil is an Indian Hindi-language television drama series which premiered on 6 June 2025 to 24 November 2025 on YouTube. Produced by Ravi Dubey and Sargun Mehta, it stars Manisha Rani, Nishank Verma, Harshad Arora, and Jennifer Emannuel.

== Plot ==
Indu, a woman whose infectious joy lights up every room. Married and deeply in love, her world feels complete... until a devastating secret shatters everything. Indu discovers her husband's infidelity, pushing her into an identity crisis she never saw coming.

For so long, her life was defined by him. Now, faced with betrayal, she must confront the painful question: Who is She, truly, when her world is no longer about "them"?

== Cast ==
- Manisha Rani as Indu
- Nishank Verma as Kushaal
- Harshad Arora as Vivek Chawla
- Jenifer Emannuel as Dolly
- Sanjana Solanki as Mahima
- Manoj Bhatia as Rajendra Chawla
- Swati Trar as Vasundhara Chawla
- Anju Kapoor as Garima Rathod
- Sukhpal Singh as Vikram Rathod
- Minaal Kalra as Mohan Rathod
- Priya Bharadwaj as Rajeshwari Rathod

== Soundtrack ==
Title	Singer	Lyrics	Label
"Haale Dil Title Track"	Danny	Avvy Ballagan	Dreamiyata Music
"Tu Mere Khwab Ch"	Taanvi Sharma	Taanvi Sharma	Dreamiyata Music

Main theme song

== Production ==
=== Release ===
In May 2025, Ravi Dubey and Sargun Mehta announced a new series titled Haale Dil.

=== Casting ===
Manisha Rani was selected to play Indu. Harshad Arora was chosen to play Vivek Chawla. Nishank Verma was as signed to play Kushaal.
