= Dahleez (2016 TV series) =

2016 Indian television series

- Genre: Drama; Romance
- Created by: Shubham Chaturvedi
- Written by: Farhan Salaruddin; Rajesh Chawla
- Directed by: Shashant Shah; Rohit Raj Goyal; Faheim Inamdar
- Creative director: Rishi Rajendra
- Starring: Harshad Arora; Tridha Choudhury
- Theme music composer: Prakriti Akriti
- Opening theme: "Jiya Re" by Jubin Nautiyal
- Country of origin: India
- Original language: Hindi
- No. of seasons: 1
- No. of episodes: 104

Production
- Producer: Farhan Salaruddin
- Production locations: Delhi; Mumbai
- Cinematography: Sunil Vishwakarma; Ravi K Yadav
- Camera setup: Single-camera
- Running time: 26 minutes approx.
- Production company: Fortune Productions

Original release
- Network: StarPlus
- Release: 14 March – 26 June 2016

Dahleez is an Indian romantic drama television series that aired on StarPlus. It was produced by Fortune Productions of Farhan Salaruddin. The series aired from 14 March 2016 to 26 June 2016. It starred Harshad Arora and Tridha Choudhury.

Based in Delhi, it focuses on the bureaucracy of India, how the country works, and the high-level politics that happens behind closed doors with a terrorism angle. Harshad Arora plays the role of an IAS officer and Tridha Choudhury essays the role of a lawyer.

== Plot ==
Set in the political and legal world of Delhi, Adarsh Sinha is an honest IAS Officer who belongs to a family of high legal stature. His mother Suhasini Sinha, is a renowned senior advocate, his father Manohar Sinha, and elder brother Jaidev Sinha, bureaucratic officers, and his younger brother Abhay Sinha, an IPS officer. While Jaidev and his wife Jaya have a loveless arranged marriage, Abhay has recently eloped with his immature wife Simmi, whose corrupt father owns Ahuja Constructions.

Swadheenta Ramakrishnan is a strong, aspiring lawyer hailing from Chennai. She moves to Chandni Chowk with her uncle Haider Gilani, aunt Zubeida Gilani, and brother Asad Gilani, and hails from a middle class Tamilian family.

Adarsh spots Swadheenta at a friend's wedding and begins pursuing her. Soon, Swadheenta is assigned a difficult case against Ahuja Constructions, for which she meets Adarsh's mother Suhasini for guidance, and soon wins it, following which she starts working as Suhasini's assistant. Adarsh and Swadheenta meet again when they're assigned to a case together in Faridabad. Gradually, they begin to develop feelings for each other.

When Adarsh decides to propose to Swadheenta, supported by his brothers, he finds out she is already betrothed to her father's favourite Bharatanatyam student, Jeevan. Adarsh takes Bharatanatyam lessons from her father, and finally wins over the family, but is still unsure of Swadheenta's feelings. Suhasini arranges for Adarsh's engagement to Vanshika Bundela, the daughter of a reputed family in the Indian army. Swadheenta finally reaches the venue and confesses her love for Adarsh. Meanwhile, her brother Asad proposes to Radhika, who is engaged to Yash, Vanshika's brother.

With Jaya's help, Adarsh and Swadheenta convince Suhasini to approve of their marriage. Swadheenta promises Suhasini she will never interfere in her relationship with her son.

As their wedding preparations begin, the youngest brothers Asad and Abhay find out about a terrorist scheme plotted by Asad's tenant friends who plan to bomb the wedding location. They chase the terrorists, but Abhay is killed in the encounter, and Asad is mistaken to be a terrorist and shot dead when his friends escape.

While the Sinhas and Gilanis are both devastated, the Gilanis are nationally labelled as terrorists, and Suhasini and Swadheenta find themselves fighting for their families on opposing sides. Swadheenta believes Asad is innocent and Adarsh soon finds out that Manohar and Jaidev's senior minister have covered up the mistake made by the police. He lets Suhasini know of this, and betrayed, she soon changes her side to defend the innocent Gilanis. Swadheenta and Adarsh find Ifteqar Alam, the man behind the operation, while Lt. Yash Bundela finally assassinates him using a suicide bomb, sacrificing himself.

The truth is out in the open and the serial ends on a peaceful note where the Gilanis forgive the Sinhas, Manohar, Jaidev, and Minister Choudhary are brought in under enquiry, and Swadheenta returns to her in-laws.

== Cast ==
=== Main ===
- Harshad Arora as Adarsh Sinha; Manohar and Suhasini's son; Jaidev and Abhay's brother; Swadheenta's husband (2016)
- Tridha Choudhury as Advocate Swadheenta Sinha (nee Ramakrishnan); Vijaykanth and Revathi's daughter; Asad's cousin; Adarsh's wife (2016)

=== Recurring ===
- Meghna Malik as Advocate Suhasini Sinha; Manohar's wife; Jaidev, Adarsh, and Abhay's mother (2016)
- Amit Behl as IAS Manohar Sinha; Suhasini's husband; Jaidev, Adarsh, Abhay's father (2016)
- Mohit Chauhan as University Professor Haider Gilani; Zubeida's husband; Asad's father; Swadheenta's uncle (2016)
- Natasha Rastogi as Zubeida Gilani; Haider's wife; Asad's mother; Swadheenta'ś aunt (2016)
- Meer Ali as IAS Jaidev Sinha; Manohar and Suhasini's elder son; Adarsh and Abhay's elder brother; Jaya's husband (2016)
- Hunar Hali as Jaya Sinha; Jaidev's wife (2016)
- Aryan Pandit as DCP Abhay Sinha, Manohar, and Suhasini's younger son; Simple's husband (2016)(Dead)
- Nazea Hasan Sayed as Simple "Simmi" Sinha (née Ahuja); Navin's daughter; Abhay's widow (2016)
- Chirag Mahbubani as Asad Gilani; Haider and Zubeida's son; Swadheenta's cousin (2016)(Dead)
- Vaibhavi Upadhyay as Journalist (2016)
- Farook Qaasi as Naveen Ahuja; Simple's father (2016)
- Manish Wadhwa as Advocate Arjun Sanghvi (2016
- Siddharth Sen as Arvind Gupta/Major Iftikhar Alam (2016)(Dead)
- Khushboo Purohit as Vanshika Bundela (2016)
- Aashish K N Mehrotra as Lieutenant Yashvardhan "Yash" Bundela (2016)(Dead)
- Nikki Sharma as Radhika Deshmukh (2016)
- Sagar Saini as Vijaykanth Ramakrishnan, Swadheenta's father (2016)
- Neha Bam as Revathi Ramakrishnan (née Gilani), Swadheenta's mother (2016)
- Eklavey Kashyap as Ravi/Raqib Alam (2016)(Dead)
- Aman Tyagi as Rajesh/Mohsin Khan (2016)(Dead)
- Sohit Vijay Soni as Reporter (2016)
- Neha Kaul as Leela Sohni (2016)
- piyush rocking raj as Piyush rocking raj

=== Special appearances ===
- Shiva as Mukesh/Shekar
- Sathish as himself
- Kriti Sanon as herself
- Rakul Preet Singh as herself

=== Guest appearance ===
- Kiran Srinivas as Jeevan Bharadwaj

== Production ==
=== Development ===
Before premiere, while under pre-production, it was titled as Swadheenta but was renamed as Dahleez later.

The title track 'Jiya Re' has been penned by the Superbia band and sung by Jubin Nautiyal. The series was directed by Rohit Raj Goyal, Shashant Shah and Faheim Inamdar.

In December 2015, the shooting of the series was disrupted for few hours due to a dispute between director Rohit Raj Goyal and actress Meghna Malik. In March 2016, the shooting of a sequence was delayed with the mob of people to take photos with the lead actor Harshad Arora.

=== Filming ===
The series was mostly filmed at various locations in Delhi including Jama Masjid, Khan Market, Sainik Farms in Chhatarpur and the India Gate. However, in early June 2016, before its end, the shootings were done in Mumbai.

=== Training ===
The character of lead Tridha Choudhury being Tamil, she took training for Tamil language for the series. Meghna Malik for training for her role of an advocate said, "For Dahleez I spent a day at the Mumbai High Court as I had never been to a court earlier."

=== Cancellation ===
The series was a planned finite series but was wrapped up sooner, after 106 episodes on 26 June 2016, as it did not garner as good ratings as were expected.
