= Harshad Arora =

Indian television actor (born 1987)

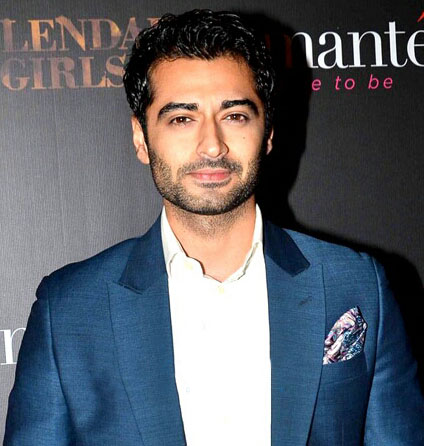
- Arora in 2016
- Born: 3 September 1987 (age 38); Delhi, India
- Occupation: Actor
- Years active: 2013–present
- Known for: Beintehaa; Dahleez
- Height: 5 ft 10 in (1.78 m)
- Spouse: Muskaan Rajput (m. 2024)
- Awards: ITA Awards; Indian Telly Awards

Harshad Arora (born 3 September 1987) is an Indian actor and model who appears in Hindi television. He made his acting debut in 2013 with Colors TV's popular Beintehaa portrayed male protagonist Zain Abdullah for which he received ITA Award for Best Actor Popular. In 2016, Arora was seen as an IAS officer Adarsh Sinha in Star Plus's Dahleez.

In 2015, he participated in Colors TV's stunt-based reality show Fear Factor: Khatron Ke Khiladi 6. He was then seen in Thodasa Badal Thodasa Paani and Ghum Hai Kisikey Pyaar Meiin (2023).

== Early life and education ==
Arora was born in Delhi, India. His father is a businessman. In the beginning of his career, he has worked in modeling and television commercials.

He started modeling from his college days. He received his early education from Ryan International School, New Delhi and then pursued a Bachelor of Science degree B.Sc. from Delhi University.

== Personal life ==
On 8 December 2024, Arora married his girlfriend, Muskaan Rajput in Delhi.

== Career ==
=== Early work and success (2013–2016) ===
Arora made his acting debut with television as a male lead in 2013, when he played Zain Abdullah in Colors TV's popular romantic show Beintehaa opposite Preetika Rao. Their onscreen chemistry became an instant hit and is still loved by the masses. Beintehaa drew praise for him and he also received several awards including the Indian Television Academy Award, Indian Telly Award and Kalakar Award. The show returned in the year 2016 with the same episodes but a different name, Salaam-E-Ishq Daastaan Mohabbat Ki (transl. Salame Ishq: the story of love") and was broadcast on Colors Rishtey.

This series has also been dubbed in Tamil as Alaipayuthey on Raj TV. The series has also been dubbed in Indonesian and aired on ANTV with the same name Beintehaa. The series has also been dubbed in Turkish language and aired on Kanal 7 channel in the name Benimsin. The series has also been dubbed in South Africa in the name Endless Love on Glow TV. The series has also been dubbed in Bosnia and Herzegovina and aired on OBN TV channel in the name Aaliya. The series has also been dubbed in Tanzania in Swahili language and aired on Azam TV(azam two) with the same name Beintehaa. In 2017, the show was premiered in Afghanistan on Lemar (TV channel) under the title احساس. It was also aired in Arabic by the title صرخة قلب on Sama Dubai. It premiered in Azerbaijan on Dalğa TV in 2018 with the name ƏBƏDİ SEVGİ.

Due to its immense popularity among audiences, Beintehaa was again reaired as "Pyaar Ka Fitoor" from 21 October 2021 and was broadcast on Colors Rishtey, just a month before its 7-year completion anniversary.

In 2015, Arora venture into reality with participating in Colors TV's stunt-based show Fear Factor: Khatron Ke Khiladi 6 where he finished at 15th place. After a year in 2016, he starred as Adarsh Sinha, an IAS officer in Star Plus's legal drama Dahleez co-starring Tridha Choudhury. The show went off air after completing 104 episodes.

=== Downturn fluctuations (2016–present) ===
From 2016 to 2017, Arora played SuperCop Jay in Life OK's supernatural drama SuperCops Vs Super Villains which was not received well. A year after in 2018, he portrayed Rajkumar Angad (The Prince of Mahapuram) in Star Bharat's fantastic series Mayavi Maling also known as The Kings Daughters. The show is a tale of finding the strength within and standing up against even the mightiest of evils. Set in a fantasy world. However, it was failed to impress the audience and after running three months it went off air.

From 2019 to 2020, Arora played the role of Alok Parihar in Sony SAB's comedy series Tera Kya Hoga Alia. The series was revamped and was retitled Carry On Alia for its the second season. After premiering two seasons it ended in October 2020 when the series was cancelled.

From August 2021 to March 2022, he portrayed Arjun Chatterjee a grey character in Colors TV's family drama serial Thodasa Badal Thodasa Paani co-starring Ishita Dutta and Karan Suchak. The series is loosely based on the movie Ek Vivaah... Aisa Bhi. It was remade in Bengali as Sona Roder Gaan. The show wraps up within seven months due to low ratings in March 2022.

From March 2023 to June 2023, he portrayed Dr. Satya Adhikari opposite Ayesha Singh in Star Plus's Ghum Hai Kisikey Pyaar Meiin. In June 2025, he playing Vivek in Dreamiyata's web series Haale Dil aired on YouTube.

== Filmography ==
=== Television ===
Year	Title	Role	Notes	Ref.
2013–2014	Beintehaa	Zain Abdullah		
2015	Fear Factor: Khatron Ke Khiladi 6	Contestant	15th place	
2016	Dahleez	IAS Adarsh Sinha		
2016–2017	SuperCops Vs Super Villains	SuperCop Jay		
2018	Mayavi Maling	Rajkumar Angad		
2019–2020	Tera Kya Hoga Alia	Alok Parihar		
2020	Kuch Smiles Ho Jayein... With Alia	Alok Parihar		
2021–2022	Thodasa Badal Thodasa Paani	Arjun Chatterjee		
2023	Ghum Hai Kisikey Pyaar Meiin	Dr. Satya Adhikari		

==== Guest appearances ====
Year	Title	Role	Ref.
2014	Bigg Boss 7	Zain Abdullah	
2014	Jhalak Dikhhla Jaa 7	Zain Abdullah	
2014	Meri Aashiqui Tumse Hi	Zain Abdullah	
2015	Cinta di Langit Taj Mahal	Zain	

=== Web series ===
Year	Title	Role	Notes	Ref.
2019	The Final Call	Abhimanyu Sahai		
2024	Pyramid	Arjun		
2025	Haale Dil	Vivek Chawla		
2025	Mafia vs Police	Lakshya Rathore	Microdrama	

== Awards and nominations ==
Year	Award	Category	Work	Result	Ref.
2014	Indian Television Academy Awards	GR8! Onscreen Couple Of The Year With (Preetika Rao)	Beintehaa	Won	
2014	Indian Television Academy Awards	Best Actor Popular	Beintehaa	Nominated	
2014	Indian Television Academy Awards	Desh Ka Sitara Best Actor	Beintehaa	Won	
2014	Indian Telly Awards	Fresh New Face (Male)	Beintehaa	Won	
2014	Indian Telly Awards	Best Actor Popular (Male)	Beintehaa	Nominated	
2014	Gold Awards	Best Actor Debut (Male)	Beintehaa	Won	
2014	Gold Awards	Best Onscreen Jodi with (Preetika Rao)	Beintehaa	Nominated	
2023	Indian Television Academy Awards	Best Actor Popular	Ghum Hai Kisikey Pyaar Meiin	Nominated	

== See also ==
- List of Indian television actors
