= Tridha Choudhury =

Indian actress (born 1989)

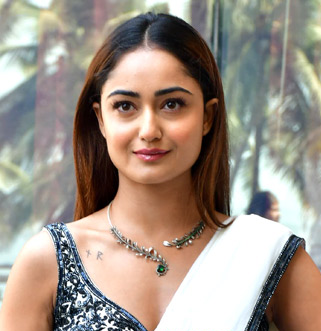
- Choudhury in 2025
- Born: Kolkata, West Bengal, India
- Education: Scottish Church College
- Occupation: Actress
- Years active: 2013–present
- Known for: Dahleez

Tridha Choudhury is an Indian actress who works primarily in Hindi, Bengali and Telugu films and television series. She was the winner of the Clean & Clear Times of India Freshface 2011 contest.

Choudhury made her film debut with Mishawr Rawhoshyo (2013), directed by Srijit Mukherji. She later appeared in the television series Dahleez, which premiered on 14 March 2016 on StarPlus.

In 2020, she appeared in the Amazon Prime Video series Bandish Bandits and the MX Player original series Aashram.

== Early life and education ==
Choudhury was born in Kolkata, West Bengal. She studied in M. P. Birla Foundation Higher Secondary School and attended Scottish Church College in Kolkata. She is actually a micro-biologist.

== Media ==
Choudhury was ranked in The Times of India's "Most Desirable Women List" at No. 13 in 2020.

== Filmography ==
Key
†	Denotes films that have not yet been released

=== Films ===
Year	Title	Role	Language	Notes	Ref.
2013	Mishawr Rawhoshyo	Rini	Bengali		
2014	Jodi Love Dile Na Prane	Aaheli	Bengali		
2014	Khaad	Meghna	Bengali		
2015	Surya vs Surya	Sanjana	Telugu		
2015	Merry Christmas	Riya	Bengali		
2016	Khawto	Sohaag	Bengali		
2018	Manasuku Nachindi	Nikita	Telugu		
2019	Shesh Theke Shuru	Yasmin	Bengali		
2019	7	Priya	Telugu/Tamil	Bilingual film	
2020	Anukunnadi Okati Ayinadi Okati	Tridha	Telugu		
2020	Haba Goba	Nandini	Hindi	Short film	
2022	Arranged	Richa	Hindi	Short film	
2023	Boomerang	Radha	Bengali		
2025	Dil Dosti Aur Dogs	Rebecca	Hindi		
2025	So Long Valley	Inspector Suman Negi	Hindi		
2025	Kis Kisko Pyaar Karoon 2	Meera	Hindi		
2026	Aakhri Sawal	Saara	Hindi		

=== Television ===
Year	Title	Role	Notes
2016	Dahleez	Swadheenta Ramakrishnan	

=== Web series ===
Year	Title	Role
2017	Spotlight	Sana Sanyal
2018	Shei Je Holud Pakhi	Vaidehi
2018	Dulha Wanted	Aarti
2020	Aashram	Babita
2020	The Chargesheet: Innocent or Guilty?	Antaraa Dixit
2020	Bandish Bandits	Sandhya
2023	Sin - Whispers of Guilt	Rumi

=== Music video appearances ===
Year	Title	Ref.	Singer
2022	"Dhokebaaz"		Afsana Khan
2023	"Tere Mere"		Asees Kaur, Stebin Ben
2023	"Dhuan Dhuan"		Nakash Aziz
