= Preetika Rao =

Indian actress

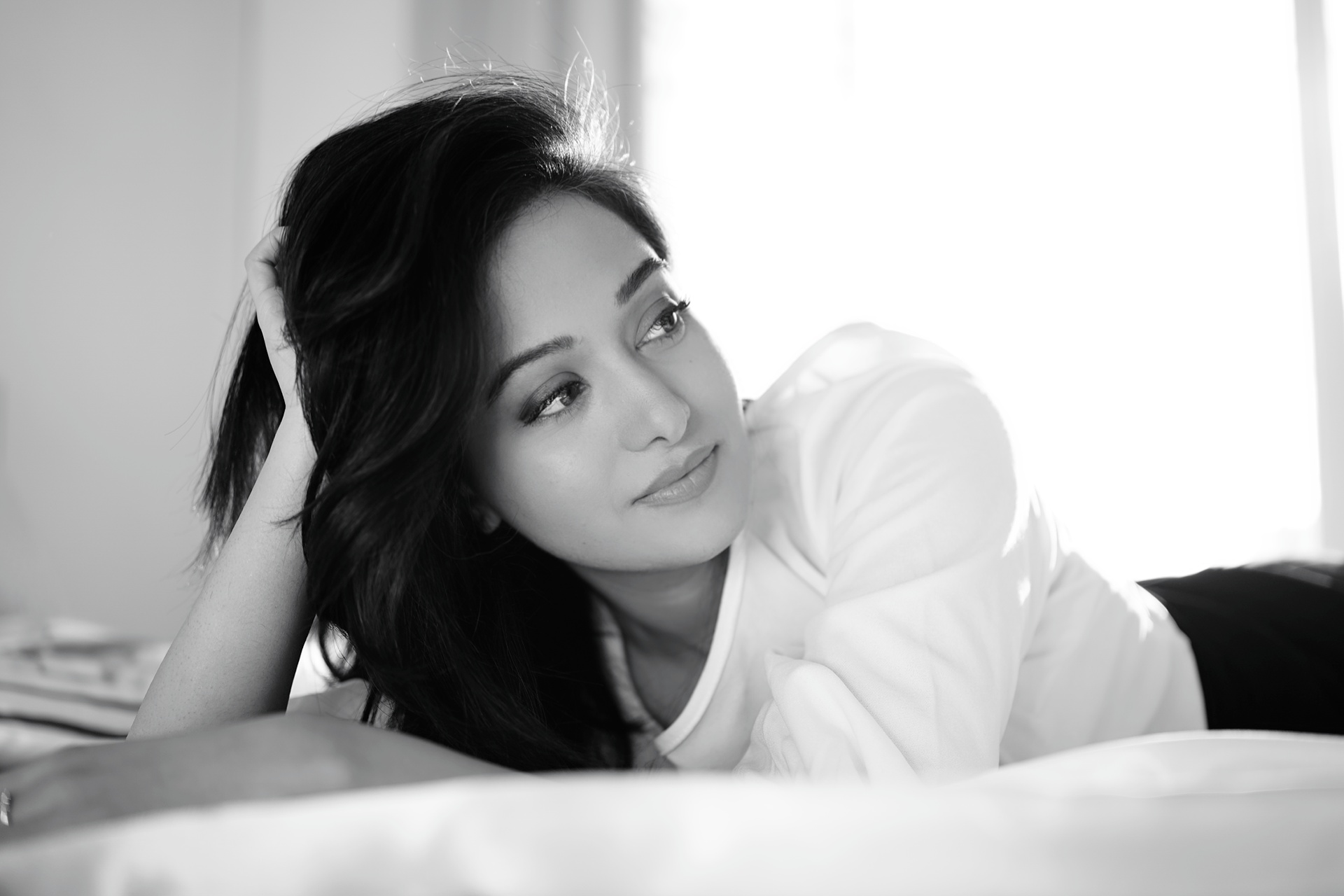
- Rao in 2022
- Born: Mangalore, Karnataka India
- Education: Sophia College, Mumbai; New York Film Academy, New York
- Occupations: Actress; model
- Years active: 2010–present
- Spouse: married (2026 - present)
- Relatives: Amrita Rao (sister)

Preetika Rao is an Indian actress, an ex film-columnist, and a famous spiritual podcaster (felicitated by The Ministry of Culture for trending Astrology Podcasts) on YouTube India for a global audience. Rao made her acting debut with the Tamil film Chikku Bukku (2010). Rao received huge popularity for her portrayal of Aaliya Haider Abdullah in Beintehaa (2013–2014) and Mohini Ranawat in Love Ka Hai Intezaar (2017). Beintehaa won her several accolades including the Gold Award for Debut in a Lead Role – Female and the Kalakar Best Actress Award in 2015.

== Early life ==
Rao was born in Mangalore, Karnataka. She comes from a Konkani - speaking Chitrapur Saraswat Brahmin family. She graduated majoring in history from Sophia College, while also acquiring a diploma in Advertising and Journalism. She wrote for Bangalore Mirror, Deccan Chronicle and the Asian Age. Her elder sister, Amrita Rao is a Bollywood actress.

After her acting debut, she moved to the United States for her diploma course in Broadcast Journalism from the New York Film Academy, New York.

== Career ==
=== 2010–2014 ===
She made her acting and film debut with the Tamil film Chikku Bukku (2010) where she played the lead as Meenal "Ammu" alongside Arya. She then made her Telugu debut with the role of Madhu Latha in Priyudu (2012) opposite Varun Sandesh.

Rao made the transition from regional cinema in 2013 and made her television debut with Beintehaa opposite Harshad Arora. She portrayed Aaliya Ghulam Haider/Aaliya Zain Abdullah and received various awards for her performance including Gold Awards Best Debut- Female.

=== 2015–2018 ===
In 2015, Rao made her singing debut with the single "Na Tum Humein Jano". The same year she made her Kannada debut with the role of Preetika in Rebel alongside Aditya (a film which she signed in 2010, but had a delayed release in 2015).

Rao also featured in the Star Plus show - Love Ka Hai Intezaar in 2017. She portrayed Mohini Mathur Ranawat/Mohini Ayaan Mehta opposite Mohit Sehgal. She then appeared as Priya alongside Yunus Khan in the short film Metro Mulaqat. The same year she released her second single "Yaad Kiya Dil Ne" with Siddharth Basrur.

In 2018, She played Mahima "Mahi" Malhotra in Laal Ishq alongside Priyank Sharma and Niti Taylor in the episode "Gudiya". She has also appeared in the music videos 'Surilee' (2017) with Shaan and in 'Tenu Bhul Na Pavagi' (2018).

=== 2019–present ===
She revealed in an interview with the Hindustan Times that she gave Bollywood a skip for television as she was not keen on entering it in spite of several offers since the beginning of her career.

She launched her Youtube channel in June 2022, making her one of the first Indian actor podcasters on YouTube. She was felicitated by the Ministry of Culture for being India's first female spiritual podcaster for a global audience on her channel, which is running successfully and marked her career as a content creator and producer on YouTube (180k+ Subscribers).

== Media image ==
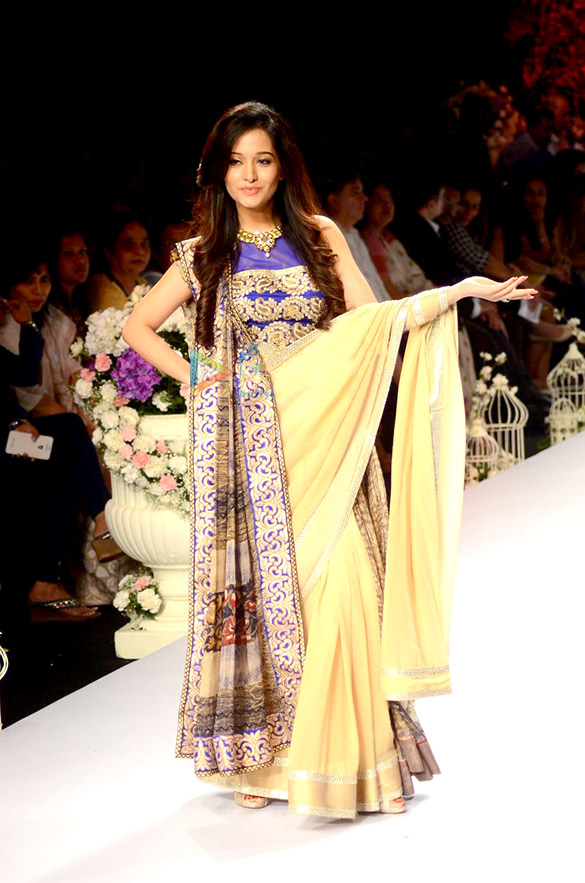
Rao at IIJW 2015

Rao was felicitated in Dar Es Salaam at the Sinema Zetu International Festival for her immense popularity in Tanzania due to her show Beintehaa. In 2014, she ranked 6th in Rediff's Top 10 Television Actresses List.

== Filmography ==
Key
†	Denotes films that have not yet been released

=== Films ===
Year	Title	Role	Language	Notes	Refs
2010	Chikku Bukku	Meenal "Ammu"	Tamil	credited as Preetika	
2012	Priyudu	Madhu Latha	Telugu		
2015	Rebel	Preetika	Kannada		
2017	Metro Mulaqat	Priya	Hindi	Short film	

=== Television ===
Year	Title	Role	Notes	Ref.
2013–2014	Beintehaa	Aaliya Zain Abdullah		
2017	Love Ka Hai Intezaar	Mohini Mehta		
2018	Laal Ishq	Mahima "Mahi" Malhotra	Episode: "Gudiya"	

=== Special appearances ===
Year	Title	Role	Ref.
2013	Bigg Boss Season 7	Aaliya Zain Abdullah	
2014	Jhalak Dikhhla Jaa 7	Aaliya Zain Abdullah	
2014	Meri Aashiqui Tumse Hi	Aaliya Zain Abdullah	

=== Music videos ===
Year	Title	Singer(s)	Ref.
2017	Surilee	Shaan	
2018	Tenu Bhul Na Pavagi	Shahid Mallya, Neelam Batra	

== Discography ==
Year	Title	Co-singer	Ref.
2015	Na Tum Humein Jano	-	
2017	Yaad Kiya Dil Ne	Siddharth Basrur	

== Awards and nominations ==
Television awards
Year	Award	Category	Work	Result	Ref.
2014	Kalakar Awards	Best Actress	Beintehaa	Won	
2014	Indian Television Academy Awards	GR8! On-screen Couple Of The Year with (Harshad Arora)	Beintehaa	Won	
2014	Indian Television Academy Awards	Best Actress - Popular	Beintehaa	Nominated	
2014	Indian Telly Awards	Fresh Face (Female)	Beintehaa	Nominated	
2014	Indian Telly Awards	Best Actress Popular	Beintehaa	Nominated	
2014	Gold Awards	Best Debut Actress	Beintehaa	Won	
2014	Gold Awards	Best Onscreen Jodi with (Harshad Arora)	Beintehaa	Nominated	
2014	Asian Viewers Television Awards	Female Actor Of The Year	Beintehaa	Nominated	
2015	Indian Telly Awards	Performer Of The Year	Beintehaa	Won	
2019	Global Woman's Achiever award	Best Actress	Beintehaa	Won	
2020	Wow! Awards	Iconic Personality Of The Year	Beintehaa	Won	
