= India's Got Talent season 10 =

Indian TV show

India's Got Talent
- Season 10
- Promotional poster for season 10, featuring judges (L to R) judges Kher, Kundra and Badshah and participants
- Hosted by: Arjun Bijlani
- Judges: Kirron Kher; Badshah; Shilpa Shetty Kundra; Anupam Kher (guest); Farah Khan (guest)
- Winners: Abujmarh Mallakhamb and Sports Academy
- Runner-up: Raaga Fusion
- No. of episodes: 30

Release
- Original network: Sony Entertainment Television
- Original release: 29 July – 5 November 2023

Season chronology
- ← Previous; Season 9 Next → Season 11

The tenth season of Indian talent competition programme India's Got Talent began on Sony Entertainment Television from 29 July 2023.

This season was won by Abujmarh Mallakhamb and Sports Academy.

== Production ==
On 18 May 2023, Fremantle India announced that there will be a tenth season of India's Got Talent with the same cast returning except Manoj Muntashir.

== Season overview ==
The taglines for the seasons returned once again. The tagline for the tenth season was "Vijayi Vishwa Hunar Hamara".

This year, shooting took place at Filmistan Studio. The show was again hosted by Arjun Bijlani. Once again this year, the judging panel changed following Manoj Muntashir's removal from the season after ill-received comments made on the Adipurush movie, for which he wrote the dialogues. Kirron Kher, Badshah and Shilpa Shetty Kundra reprised their role as judges.

During the last 2 days of the auditions Kirron Kher was absent from the sets. On the last day, she was replaced by Anupam Kher for an episode. During this season, Shilpa Shetty Kundra had been absent for multiple episodes owing to her film promotion and other unrevealed reasons.

The format for this season largely remained the same as of the previous season. Top 14 quarter-finalists^{1} compete in a weekly competition, eliminating one contestant per week. From the bottom-most contestants from public vote, judges give an anonymous verdict for whom they want to save. Results for each quarter-final are announced in the next quarter-final after all the performances.

In quarter-final 7, each judge was given two golden buzzers, to advance a contestant directly to the next quarter-final without facing elimination. In other quarter-finals, the golden buzzer served as an appreciation key.

=== Golden Buzzer Summary ===
Golden buzzer returned for its sixth series. Host was once again allowed to use the golden buzzer after season 8. Golden Buzzer acts straight away went to Top 14 Quarter-finals.

In quarter-finals, golden buzzer was used to highly appreciate an act, although it had no effect on the result of the performer except in quarter-final 7 where it saved a contestant from the elimination round.

Judges			Host
Kirron Kher	Badshah	Shilpa Shetty Kundra	Arjun Bijlani
Golden Girls; Dance Group	Mahila Band; Music Band	N-House Crew; Dance Group	Inspiring Dance Family; Hair Aerial Act
Zero Degree Crew; Dance Group	Raaga Fusion; Music Band	The ART; Dance Trio	Inspiring Dance Family; Hair Aerial Act

=== Top 14 ===
The following list includes the Top 14 quarter-finalists and their respective results in the season. Ages of the contestants were not revealed this season just like the previous season.

Winner | Runner-up | Third Place | Semi-finalist | Quarter-finalist
Golden Buzzer (Quarter-final 7) | Golden Buzzer Audition

Participant	Genre	Act	From	Last Quarter-final	Result
Abujmarh Mallakhamb and Sports Academy	Acrobatics	Mallakhamb Act	Abujmarh, Chhattisgarh	9	Winner
Anuska Chatterjee	Acrobatics	Contortionist	Kolkata, West Bengal	9	Eliminated
Awaara Crew	Dance	Dance Act	New Delhi	6	Eliminated
Golden Girls	Dance	Formation Dance Act	Kolkata, West Bengal	9	Third place
Farhan Sabir Live	Music	Music Band	New Delhi	9	Semi-finalist
Inspired Dance Family	Dance	Hair Aerial Act	Kolkata, West Bengal	3	Eliminated
Mahila Band	Music	Music Band	Kohima, Nagaland	9	Finalist
N House Crew	Dance	Acro Dance Act	Chandigarh	7	Eliminated
Raaga Fusion	Music	Music Band	Mumbai, Maharashtra	9	Runner-up
The ART	Dance	Free-style Dance Trio	Various	9	Finalist
Tholpavakhoothu Kala Kendram	Variety	Shadow Art	Palakkad, Kerala	2	Eliminated
UNB	Singing	Rapper	Sikkim, Gangtok	7	Eliminated
Vivek Singhi	Magic	Close-up Magician and Mentalist	Mumbai, Maharashtra	5	Eliminated
Zero Degree Crew	Dance	Free-style Dance Group	Kalyan, Maharashtra	9	Finalist

1. Assuming quarter-finals given that makers did not mention anything specific.

=== World Premiere (19-20 August) ===
Buzzed | Appreciation Golden Buzzer

Guest Performer- Javed Ali

Top 14	Order	Buzzes		
Top 14	Order	Kirron	Badshah	Shilpa
Golden Girls	1			
Abujmarh Mallakhamb Academy	2			
Mahila Band	3			
Zero Degree Crew	4			
UNB	5			
Vivek Singhi	6			
The A.R.T.	7			
Tholpavakoothu Kala Kendram	8			
N House Crew	9			
Raaga Fusion	10			
Farhan Sabir Live	11			
Anushka Chatterjee	12			
Awaara Crew	13			
Inspired Dance Family	14			

=== Quarter-finals Summary ===
Buzzed out |
Won Judges' Choice |
Lost Judges' Choice |
Advanced to the next quarter-final |
Appreciation Golden Buzzer

The results for each quarter-final was announced in the next quarter-final after all the performances of the week. To avoid confusion, the judges' choices and elimination data is listed in the tables according to the day, the results were announced.

==== Quarter-final 1 (26-27 August) ====
After each performance, the respective quarter-finalists appealed for their votes.

- Special Guests- Gurdas Maan, Ayushmann Khurrana and Ananya Panday

Quarter-finalist	Order	Buzzes			Result
Quarter-finalist	Order	Kirron	Badshah	Shilpa	Result
N House Crew	1				Announced in upcoming week
Mahila Band	2				Announced in upcoming week
Inspired Dance Family	3				Announced in upcoming week
Zero Degree Crew	4				Announced in upcoming week
UNB	5				Announced in upcoming week
Awaara Crew	6				Announced in upcoming week
Golden Girls	7				Announced in upcoming week
Vivek Singhi	8				Announced in upcoming week
Farhan Sabir Live	9				Announced in upcoming week
Abujmarh Mallakhamb Academy	10				Announced in upcoming week
Raaga Fusion	11				Announced in upcoming week
Anushka Chatterjee	12				Announced in upcoming week
Tholpavakhoothu Kala Kendram	13				Announced in upcoming week
The A.R.T.	14				Announced in upcoming week

==== Quarter-final 2 (2-3 September) ====
- Special Guests- Raftaar
- Guest Performers- Jasleen Royal ("Heeriye"), Anup Jalota ("Aisi Laagi Lagan")

Quarter-finalist	Order	Buzzes			Result (Q.F. 1)
Quarter-finalist	Order	Kirron	Badshah	Shilpa	Result (Q.F. 1)
Farhan Sabir Live	1				Advanced
Zero Degree Crew	2				Advanced
Mahila Band	3				Advanced
Awaara Crew	4				Advanced
The A.R.T.	5				Advanced
UNB	6				Advanced
Inspired Dance Family	7				Advanced (Won Judges' Choice)
Vivek Singhi	8				Advanced (Won Judges' Choice)
Raaga Fusion	9				Advanced
Golden Girls	10				Advanced
Abujmarh Mallakhamb Academy	11				Advanced
Anushka Chatterjee	12				Advanced
N House Crew	13				Advanced
Tholpavakhoothu Kala Kendram	14				Eliminated (Lost Judges' Choice)

==== Quarter-final 3 (9-10 September) ====
- Guest Judge- Farah Khan
- Guest Performer- Srushti Tawade

Quarter-finalist	Order	Buzzes			Result (Q.F. 2)
Quarter-finalist	Order	Kirron	Badshah	Farah	Result (Q.F. 2)
Golden Girls	1				Advanced
Zero Degree Crew	2				Advanced
Mahila Band	3				Advanced
Awaara Crew	4				Advanced
UNB	5				Advanced
Inspired Dance Family	6				Eliminated (Lost Judges' Choice)
Anushka Chatterjee	7				Advanced (Won Judges' Choice)
Farhan Sabir Live	8				Advanced
Abujmarh Mallakhamb Academy	9				Advanced
Raaga Fusion	11				Advanced
The A.R.T.	10				Advanced
Vivek Singhi	12				Advanced (Won Judges' Choice)
N House Crew	13				Advanced

==== Quarter-final 4 (16-17 September) ====
The twelve participants were a part of one of the judges' team. All the judges except the one whose team the participant is in gave scores out of ten. The participants in the team which gained the lowest scores were in the bottom four for elimination.

No elimination took place this week, the votes and scores were carried forward to the next week.

- Special Guests: Vicky Kaushal, Manushi Chhillar and Kusha Kapila

Quarter-finalist	Team	Order	Buzzes			Scores (20)
Quarter-finalist	Team	Order	Kirron	Badshah	Shilpa	Scores (20)
Abujmarh Mallakhamb Academy	Shilpa Shetty	1				20
Raaga Fusion	Badshah	2				20
N House Crew	Shilpa Shetty	3				17
UNB	Kirron Kher	4				18
The A.R.T.	Shilpa Shetty	5				18
Anushka Chatterjee	Badshah	6				20
Zero Degree Crew	Kirron Kher	7				20
Farhan Sabir Live	Kirron Kher	8				20
Golden Girls	Kirron Kher	9				18
Mahila Band	Badshah	10				20
Awaara Crew	Badshah	11				18
Vivek Singhi	Shilpa Shetty	12				19

==== Quarter-final 5 (23-24 September) ====
There were only two judges this week, owing to Shilpa Shetty's absence from the shooting.

- Special Guests: Chunky Pandey, Rahul Roy, Ayesha Jhulka and Deepak Tijori

Quarter-finalist	Order	Buzzes		Result (Q.F. 3+4)
Quarter-finalist	Order	Kirron	Badshah	Result (Q.F. 3+4)
Zero Degree Crew	1			Advanced
Farhan Sabir Live	2			Advanced (Won Judges' Choice)
N House Crew	3			Advanced
UNB	4			Advanced
Vivek Singhi	5			Eliminated (Lost Judges' Choice)
Awaara Crew	6			Advanced (Won Judges' Choice)
Abujmarh Mallakhamb Academy	7			Advanced
Golden Girls	8			Advanced
The A.R.T.	9			Advanced
Raaga Fusion	10			Advanced
Anushka Chatterjee	11			Advanced
Mahila Band	12			Advanced

==== Quarter-final 6 (1 October) ====
- Special Guests: Neha Kakkar, Kumar Sanu and Vishal Dadlani

Quarter-finalist	Order	Buzzes			Result (Q.F. 5)
Quarter-finalist	Order	Kirron	Badshah	Shilpa	Result (Q.F. 5)
Golden Girls	1				Advanced
Mahila Band	2				Advanced
Abujmarh Mallakhamb Academy	3				Advanced
Zero Degree Crew	4				Advanced
N House Crew	5				Advanced (Won Judges' Choice)
The A.R.T.	6				Advanced
Anushka Chatterjee	7				Advanced
Raaga Fusion	8				Advanced
Farhan Sabir Live	9				Advanced
Awaara Crew	10				Eliminated (Lost Judges' Choice)
UNB	11				Advanced (Won Judges' Choice)

==== Quarter-final 7 (6-7 October) ====
In this quarter-final, each judge had two golden buzzers, which will advance a participant to the next quarter-final directly. The remaining four acts would be in the bottom four and two of them would be eliminated based on the public votes only.

- Special Guests: Thank You for Coming and Yaariyan 2 star-cast

Quarter-finalist	Order	Buzzes			Result (Q.F. 6)
Quarter-finalist	Order	Kirron	Badshah	Shilpa	Result (Q.F. 6)
The A.R.T.	1				Golden Buzzer Advancement
Farhan Sabir Live	2				Golden Buzzer Advancement
Zero Degree Crew	3				Golden Buzzer Advancement
Anushka Chatterjee	4				Golden Buzzer Advancement
UNB	5				Eliminated (No Judges' Vote – Lost on Public Vote)
Golden Girls	6				Golden Buzzer Advancement
Mahila Band	7				Advanced (No Judges' Vote – Won on Public Vote)
Abujmarh Mallakhamb Academy	8				Advanced (No Judges' Vote – Won on Public Vote)
Raaga Fusion	9				Golden Buzzer Advancement
N House Crew	10				Eliminated (No Judges' Vote – Lost on Public Vote)

==== Quarter-final 8 (14-15 October) ====
No elimination took place this week, the votes were carried forward to the next week.

- Special Guests: Ravi Teja, Gayatri Bhardwaj, Nupur Sanon and Ramdev

Quarter-finalist	Order	Buzzes		
Quarter-finalist	Order	Kirron	Badshah	Shilpa
Zero Degree Crew	1			
Abujmarh Mallakhamb Academy	2			
Farhan Sabir Live	3			
Mahila Band	4			
The A.R.T.	5			
Anushka Chatterjee	6			
Raaga Fusion	7			
Golden Girls	8			

==== Quarter-final 9 (21-22 October) ====
There were only two judges this week, owing to Shilpa Shetty's absence from the shooting.

- Special Guest: Vidhu Vinod Chopra
- Guest Performers: Divyansh and Manuraj - winners of season 9

Quarter-finalist	Order	Buzzes		Result (Q.F. 7+8)
Quarter-finalist	Order	Kirron	Badshah	Result (Q.F. 7+8)
Abujmarh Mallakhamb Academy	1			Advanced
Golden Girls	2			Advanced
The A.R.T.	3			Advanced (Won Judges' Choice)
Farhan Sabir Live	4			Advanced (Won Judges' Choice)
Zero Degree Crew	5			Advanced
Mahila Band	6			Advanced
Anushka Chatterjee	7			Eliminated (Lost Judges' Choice)
Raaga Fusion	8			Advanced

=== Semi-finals summary ===
Buzzed out |
Won Judges' Choice |
Lost Judges' Choice |
Advanced to the finale |
Appreciation Golden Buzzer

There were only two judges in semi-finals, owing to Badshah's absence from the shooting.

==== Semi-final 1 (28 October) ====
- Special Guests: Radhika Madan, Nimrat Kaur, Bhagyashree and Yo Yo Honey Singh.

Semi-finalist	Order	Buzzes		Result (Q.F. 9)
Semi-finalist	Order	Kirron	Shilpa	Result (Q.F. 9)
Abujmarh Mallakhamb Academy	1			Advanced
Farhan Sabir Live	2			Eliminated (Lost Judges' Choice)
Zero Degree Crew	3			Advanced
Mahila Band	4			Advanced
Golden Girls	5			Advanced
Raaga Fusion	7			Advanced (Won Judges' Choice)
The A.R.T.	6			Advanced (Won Judges' Choice)

==== Semi-final 2 (29 October) ====
No elimination took place in this episode. After each performance, participants requested to vote for the finale, given that this was the last voting of the season.

- Special Guests: Jhalak Dikhhla Jaa (season 11) cast - Rithvik Dhanjani, Gauahar Khan, Sangeeta Phogat, Adrija Sinha, Tanishaa Mukerji and Rajiv Thakur

Semi-finalist	Order	Buzzes	
Semi-finalist	Order	Kirron	Shilpa
Abujmarh Mallakhamb Academy	1		
Golden Girls	4		
Zero Degree Crew	2		
Mahila Band	3		
The A.R.T.	5		
Raaga Fusion	6		

=== Grand Finale (4–5 November) ===
The top 4 finalist among the six participants were announced based on the anonymous judges' scores given in final and the winner and runners-up were announced based solely on the public votes.

Winner | Runner-up | 3rd place | 4th place

- Special Guest: Karan Johar
- Guest Performers: Ishita Vishwakarma, Rishabh Chaturvedi and Warrior Squad – runners-up and finalists of season 9

Finalist	Order	Result (5 November)
Abujmarh Mallakhamb Academy	1	1st
Raaga Fusion	2	2nd
Golden Girls	3	3rd
Zero Degree Crew	4	4th
Mahila Band	5	Eliminated (Top 6)
The A.R.T.	6	Eliminated (Top 6)

== Ratings ==
Ep. No.	Title	Event	Air date	TVR	SET India Weekly Rank
1	'Vijayi Vishwa Hunar'	Auditions 1	29 July 2023	1.8	1
2	'Unleashing India's Hidden Gems'	Auditions 2	30 July 2023	1.8	1
3	'Hunar Ki Talaash'	Auditions 3	5 August 2023	1.5	1
4	'Break The Record'	Auditions 4	6 August 2023	1.5	1
5	'Hauslo Ki Chhalang'	Auditions 5	12 August 2023	1.3	1
6	'Auditions Ka Akhri Daur'	Auditions 6	13 August 2023	1.3	1
7	'Talent Ka World Premiere'	Grand Premiere	19 August 2023	1.3	1
8	'Hunar Ka Naya Rang'	Grand Premiere	20 August 2023	1.3	1
9	'Indian Talent Ka World Class Show'	Quarter-final 1	26 August 2023	1.3	1
10	'Desh Ki Mitti Se Jude Hunarbaaz'	Quarter-final 1	27 August 2023	1.3	1
11	'Hunar Ka Jalwa'	Quarter-final 2	2 September 2023	1.1	3
12	'Janmashtami Special'	Quarter-final 2	3 September 2023	1.1	3
13	'Hunar Ka Alag Andaaz'	Quarter-final 3	9 September 2023	0.9	2
14	'Indian Railway Special'	Quarter-final 3	10 September 2023	0.9	2
15	'Ganesh Chaturthi Special'	Quarter-final 4	16 September	1.0	2
16	'Judge's Challenge'	Quarter-final 4	17 September	1.0	2
17	'Rishton Ka Reunion'	Quarter-final 5	23 September	1.0	2
18	'Bemisaal Reunion'	Quarter-final 5	24 September	1.0	2
19	'Party Special - Part 1'	Quarter-final 6	1 October	0.8	3
20	'Party Special - Part 2'	Quarter-final 6	1 October	0.8	3
21	'Golden Buzzer Special - Part 1'	Quarter-final 7	7 October	0.9	3
22	'Golden Buzzer Special - Part 2'	Quarter-final 7	8 October	0.9	3
23	'Mass Mania Special'	Quarter-final 8	14 October	0.9	1
24	'Navaratri Special'	Quarter-final 8	15 October	0.9	1
25	'Talent Aur Entertainment Ka Dum'	Quarter-final 9	21 October	1.0	1
26	'Entertainment Ki Udaan'	Quarter-final 9	22 October	1.0	1
27	'India's Got Talent ka Semi-Finals'	Semi-final 1	28 October	0.6	2
28	'Welcome Jhalak Dikhhla Ja'	Semi-final 2	29 October	0.6	2
29	'Hunar Ka Vishwa Cup - Grand Finale - Part 1'	Grand Finale	4 November	0.6	2
30	'Hunar Ka Vishwa Cup - Grand Finale - Part 2'	Grand Finale	5 November	0.6	2
