= India's Got Talent season 11 =

Indian TV show

India's Got Talent
- Season 11
- Hosted by: Aditya Narayan(Ep. 25-); Haarsh Limbachiyaa(Ep.1-24)
- Judges: Navjot Singh Sidhu; Malaika Arora; Shaan
- Winner: The Amazing Apsaras
- Runner-up: Sound of Souls x Gaurash

Release
- Original network: Sony Entertainment Television
- Original release: 4 October 2025 – 4 January 2026

Season chronology
- ← Previous; Season 10

The eleventh season of the Indian talent competition programme India's Got Talent aired on Sony Entertainment Television from 4 October 2025, 9:30 pm IST, with the finale held on 4 January 2026. The season was won by The Amazing Apsaras, Sound of Souls x Gaurash finishing as the runners-up, and Hidden Fire Crew securing third place..

== Production ==
On 10 September 2024, a promo was shared on SET's social media handles starring Navjot Singh Sidhu with the tagline "Jo Ajab Hai, Wohi Gajab Hai", along with revealing the name plaques of the new and returning judges, which include, Navjot Singh Sidhu, Shaan and the veteran judge, Malaika Arora.

== Season overview ==
This year, shooting took place at Yash Raj Studios. The show was hosted by Haarsh Limbachiyaa, husband of the former host Bharti Singh. This year the judge panel was revamped as Kirron Kher bid farewell to the series after completing her ten seasons, Badshah had commitments for the Indian Idol season 16 auditions and Shilpa Shetty also parted her ways.

After two years of being shifted to Sony Entertainment Television, the original format of the show was brought back, with auditions, judge cuts, semi-finals and the finale.

=== Golden Buzzer Summary ===
Golden buzzer returned for its seventh season. Golden Buzzer acts straight away went to the semi-finals, as the show returns to its original format.

==== Auditions 1-6 ====
| Sidhu | Malaika | Shaan |
|---|---|---|
| Nepal Tigers; Taekwondo Group | The Hidden Fire Crew; Dance Group | Rainbow Dance Troupe; Theatrical Act |
| Afla Tunes; Acapella Music Group | Akash and Abhishek; Body Balancing Duo | Dhanraj & Gayatri; Duo Hair Aerial Act |
| Anwar's Little Flames; Dance Group | Swaavlambi Foundation; Salsa Duo | The Royal Symphony and Choir; Choir |
Parineeti Bishnoi; Yoga Act
Hardol Mallakhamb Academy; Mallakhamb Act
R.D. Warriors; Dance Group

==== Auditions 7-12 ====
| Sidhu | Malaika | Shaan |
|---|---|---|
| SSP Academy; Balancing Act | K. Vignesh; Magician | AA Crew; Dance Group |
| Ismail Khan Langa & Group; Folk Band | Yo Highness; Dance Group | The Amazing Apsaras; Dance Group |
| Sabri Brothers; Kawali Group | Riju and Raju Sarkar; Dance and Balance Duo | The Amazing Apsaras; Dance Group |
Maada Squad; Aerial Act
Chibi Unity; Dance Group

==== Auditions 13-14 ====
| Sidhu | Malaika | Shaan |
|---|---|---|
| Beat Plus; Mirror Dance Group | V Company; Dance Group | Harshad & Duhita Golesar; Singing Duo |
| Devote Art; Folk Dance Group | The Evokers; Variety Fusion Dance Group | Harshad & Duhita Golesar; Singing Duo |

=== Judge Cuts Summary ===
Buzzed Out
Judge Cuts Golden Buzzer
Advanced to Semi-Finals (Golden Buzzer)
Advanced to Semifinals
Eliminated

==== Aar ya Paar 1: Spotlight (25–26 October) ====
15 acts selected from the auditions had to compete for three spots in the semi-finals. After each performance, the judges could award a spot to an act and were allowed to replace previously selected acts as the competition progressed. Ultimately, two acts advanced through the spotlight selection, along with one act that received the Golden Buzzer from the judges.

- Guest Performance: Maahi and Soham (Shaan's sons) - "Kuch Kam"
- Special Guests: Raadhika Mukherjee, Salim Merchant
- Special Performance: Shaan and Salim - "Tum Jo Kaho Toh"

| Participant | Order | Buzzes | | | Result |
| Participant | Order | Sidhu | Malaika | Shaan | Result |
|---|---|---|---|---|---|
| Akash and Gaglina | 1 | | | | Eliminated |
| Akhtar Hindustani | 2 | | | | Eliminated; Was Given the Spot; Replaced by Himanshu |
| Sushil Jaiswal | 3 | | | | Eliminated; Was Given the Spot; Replaced by Rashid Khan |
| Hillphonics | 4 | Golden Buzzer | | | Advanced to Semi-finals |
| Rashid Khan | 5 | | | | Eliminated; Was Given the Spot; Replaced by Anil Ventriloquist |
| Laxmikant Kaje | 6 | | | | Eliminated |
| The Punjabi Boys | 7 | | | | Eliminated |
| A Lycans India | 8 | | | | Eliminated |
| Anil Ventriloquist | 9 | | | | Eliminated; Was Given the Spot; Replaced by Vivek Patil |
| Vivek Patil | 10 | | | | Eliminated; Was Given the Spot; Replaced by Cali Boys |
| Himanshu Shekhar | 11 | | | | Advanced |
| Cali Boys | 12 | | | | Advanced |
| The Rising Duo | 13 | | | | Eliminated |
| Mohit Chopra Live Band | 14 | | | | Eliminated |
| Joel Kaden Sasi Pereira | 15 | | | | Eliminated |

==== Aar ya Paar 2 (22–23 November) ====
12 acts selected from the auditions had to compete for spots in the semi-finals. In the end, one act that received the Golden Buzzer and two acts selected by the judges advanced to the semi-finals.

| Participant | Order | Buzzes | | | Result |
| Participant | Order | Sidhu | Malaika | Shaan | Result |
|---|---|---|---|---|---|
| Sakshi and Kapil | 1 | | | | Advanced |
| Skippers Crew | 2 | | | | Eliminated |
| Takshvi Vaghani | 3 | | | | Eliminated |
| Krish and Kishore | 4 | Golden Buzzer | | | Advanced to Semi-finals |
| Prashanth Mani | 5 | | | | Eliminated |
| Nischal Gante Nethrananda | 6 | | | | Eliminated |
| Wentertainers | 7 | | | | Eliminated |
| Pramod Patel and Shruti Upmanya | 8 | | | | Eliminated |
| Rahul Singh | 9 | | | | Advanced |
| Praveen Prajapat | 10 | | | | Eliminated |
| 8 Wonders | 11 | | | | Eliminated |
| Kapow! | 12 | | | | Eliminated |

==== Aar ya Paar 3: Knockout (13-14 December) ====
Acts were called to perform against each other in batches, out of which one act would stay while the other was eliminated immediately. However, in the end, only the two best acts chosen by the judges advanced to the semi-finals.

- Guest Performances: Divyansh and Manuraj, Ishita Vishwakarma and Rishabh Chaturvedi from season 9 and Zero Degree Crew from season 10.

| Participant | Batch | Order | Buzzes | | | Result |
| Participant | Batch | Order | Sidhu | Malaika | Shaan | Result |
|---|---|---|---|---|---|---|
| Pranay and Nikhil | 1 | 1 | | | | Eliminated; Won the Batch Challenge |
| Prokash and Minarui | 1 | 2 | | | | Eliminated |
| Naadsaad | 2 | 3 | | | | Eliminated; Won the Batch Challenge |
| Sound of Souls x Gauransh | 2 | 4 | Golden Buzzer | | | Advanced to Semi-finals |
| Prankul | 3 | 5 | | | | Eliminated |
| Sudesh Sharma | 3 | 6 | | | | Eliminated |
| Tulsi Molparia | 3 | 7 | | | | Eliminated; Won the Batch Challenge |
| Classic Queens | 4 | 8 | | | | Advanced; Won the Batch Challenge |
| Mahi Krishna Leela | 4 | 9 | | | | Eliminated |
| Jawahar Mallakamb | 5 | 10 | | | | Eliminated; Won the Batch Challenge |
| Niyoshi Marfatia | 5 | 11 | | | | Eliminated |
| Pathania Sky Force | 6 | 12 | | | | Eliminated |
| We are one | 6 | 13 | | | | Eliminated; Won the Batch Challenge |

=== Top 36 Acts ===
The golden buzzer auditionees, and the qualified contestants of the judge-cuts performed in two semi-finals. The list of semi-finalists of this season is given as follows:

Winner | Runner-up | Third place | Finalist
Golden Buzzer | Semi-Final Golden Buzzer

| Participant | Genre | Performance Type | From | Semi-final | Finished |
|---|---|---|---|---|---|
| AA Crew | Dance | Dance Group | Prayagraj, Uttar Pradesh | 2 | Eliminated |
| Afla Tunes | Music | Singing (Acapella) Group | Mumbai, Maharashtra | 2 | Eliminated |
| Akash and Abhishek | Variety | Body Balancing Duo | Delhi | 2 | Finalist |
| Ankit Kanaujia | Variety | Calisthenics | Delhi | 1 | Eliminated |
| Anwar's Little Flames | Dance | Dance Group | Siliguri, West Bengal | 2 | Eliminated |
| Beat Plus | Dance | Mirror Dance Group | Indore, Madhya Pradesh | 2 | Eliminated |
| Cali Boys | Variety | Calisthenics Act | Delhi | 2 | Finalist |
| Chibi Unity | Dance | Dance Group | Niigata, Japan | 1 | Eliminated |
| Classic Queens | Dance | Folk & Modern Dance Group | Mumbai, Maharashtra | 2 | Finalist |
| Devote Art | Dance | Folk Dance Group | Gangtok, Sikkim | 2 | Eliminated |
| Dhanraj & Gayatri | Variety | Duo Hair Aerial Act | Guwahati, Assam | 1 | Finalist |
| Hardol Mallakhamb Academy | Variety | Mallakhamb Act | Kota, Rajasthan | 2 | Eliminated |
| Harshad & Duhita Golesar | Music | Singing Duo | Nashik, Maharashtra | 2 | Eliminated |
| Hidden Fire Crew | Dance | Dance Group | Mumbai, Maharashtra | 1 | Third place |
| Himanshu Shekhar | Magic | Psychic Magician | Delhi | 1 | Eliminated |
| Ismail Khan Langa & Group | Music | Folk Fusion Band | Rajasthan | 2 | Eliminated |
| K. Vignesh | Magic | Magician | Chennai, Tamil Nadu | 2 | Finalist |
| Krish and Kishore | Music | Singing Brother Duo | Mumbai | 1 | Finalist |
| Maada Squad | Dance | Aerial Act | Navi Mumbai, Maharashtra | 2 | Eliminated |
| Nepal Tigers | Variety | Taekwondo Act | Kathmandu, Nepal | 2 | Finalist |
| Parineeti Bishnoi and Rupa Bishnoi | Variety | Yoga Act | Jodhpur, Rajasthan | 1 | Eliminated |
| R.D. Warriors | Dance | Acro Dance Group | Dombivli, Maharashtra | 1 | Eliminated |
| Rahul Singh | Magic | Math-Magician | Noida, Uttar Pradesh | 1 | Eliminated |
| Rainbow Dance Troupe | Drama/ Dance | Theatrical Act | Kolkata, West Bengal | 1 | Finalist |
| Riju and Raju Sarkar | Dance | Dance and Balance Duo | Cooch Behar, West Bengal | 1 | Finalist |
| Sabri Brothers | Music | Kawali Group | Delhi | 1 | Eliminated |
| Sakshi and Kapil | Variety | Balancing Duo | Rohtak, Haryana | 2 | Eliminated |
| Sound of Souls x Gaurash | Music | Music Band | Various | 1 | Runner-up |
| SSP Academy | Variety | Balancing Duo | Nabadwip, West Bengal | 1 | Eliminated |
| Swaavlambi Foundation | Dance | Salsa Duo | Kolkata, West Bengal | 1 | Eliminated |
| The Amazing Apsaras | Dance | Dance Group | Kolkata, West Bengal | 2 | Winner |
| The Evokers | Dance | Variety Fusion Dance Group | Various parts on India | 2 | Eliminated |
| The Hillphonics | Music | Singing and Dance Group | Sikkim | 1 | Finalist |
| The Royal Symphony and Choir | Music | Choir | Chhattisgarh | 2 | Eliminated |
| V Company | Dance | Dance Group | Mumbai, Maharashtra | 2 | Finalist |
| Yo Highness | Dance | All Girls Dance Group | Dombivli, Maharashtra | 1 | Eliminated |

=== Semi-finals Summary ===
Buzzed Out
Golden Buzzer
Advanced to Finals (Golden Buzzer)
Won Judges' Choice
Eliminated

==== Semi-final 1 (20-21 December) ====
| Participant | Order | Buzzes | | | Result |
| Participant | Order | Sidhu | Malaika | Shaan | Result |
|---|---|---|---|---|---|
| Swaavlambi Foundation | 1 | | | | Eliminated |
| Rainbow Dance Troupe | 2 | | | Live Golden Buzzer | Golden Buzzer Advancement |
| Ankit Kanaujia | 3 | | | | Eliminated |
| Sabri Brothers | 4 | | | | Eliminated |
| Parineeti Bishnoi and Rupa Bishnoi | 5 | | | | Eliminated |
| Sound of Souls x Gaurash | 6 | | Live Golden Buzzer | | Golden Buzzer Advancement |
| Chibi Unity | 7 | | | | Eliminated |
| Himanshu Shekhar | 8 | | | | Eliminated |
| Riju and Raju Sarkar | 9 | Live Golden Buzzer | | | Golden Buzzer Advancement |
| SSP Academy | 10 | | | | Eliminated |
| Krish and Kishore Mondal | 11 | | | | Won Judges' Choice |
| Hidden Fire Crew | 12 | Live Golden Buzzer | | | Golden Buzzer Advancement |
| RD Warriors | 13 | | | | Eliminated |
| Yo Highness | 14 | | | | Eliminated |
| The Hillphonics | 15 | | | | Won Judges' Choice |
| Dhanraj and Gayatri | 16 | | | | Won Judges' Choice |
| Rahul Singh | 17 | | | | Eliminated |

==== Semi-final 2 (27-28 December) ====
Guest Host: Aditya Narayan

| Participant | Order | Buzzes | | | Result |
| Participant | Order | Sidhu | Malaika | Shaan | Result |
|---|---|---|---|---|---|
| Akash and Abhishek | 1 | Live Golden Buzzer | | | Golden Buzzer Advancement |
| Classic Queens | 2 | Live Golden Buzzer | | | Golden Buzzer Advancement |
| Devote Art | 3 | | | | Eliminated |
| Beat Plus | 4 | | | | Eliminated |
| Sakshi and Kapil | 5 | | | | Eliminated |
| Nepal Tigers | 6 | | Live Golden Buzzer | | Golden Buzzer Advancement |
| Harshad & Duhita Golesar | 7 | | | | Eliminated |
| Hardol Mallakhamb Academy | 8 | | | | Eliminated |
| Anwar's Little Flames | 9 | | | | Eliminated |
| Afla Tunes | 10 | | | | Eliminated |
| V Company | 11 | | | Live Golden Buzzer | Golden Buzzer Advancement |
| K. Vignesh | 12 | | | | Won Judges' Choice |
| Cali Boys | 13 | Live Golden Buzzer | | | Golden Buzzer Advancement |
| The Amazing Apsaras | 14 | | | | Won Judges' Choice |
| AA Crew | 15 | | | | Eliminated |
| The Evokers | 16 | | | | Eliminated |
| The Royal Symphony and Choir | 17 | | | | Eliminated |
| Maada Squad | 18 | | | | Eliminated |
| Ismail Khan Langa & Group | 19 | | | | Eliminated |

=== Finale Summary ===
Winner | Runner-up | 3rd place | Top 6

| Finalist | Order | Result (4 January) |
|---|---|---|
| Riju and Raju Sarkar | 1 | Top 14 |
| Classic Queens | 2 | Top 6 |
| Nepal Tigers | 3 | Top 14 |
| Akash and Abhishek | 4 | Top 6 |
| Rainbow Dance Troupe | 5 | Top 6 |
| Krish and Kishore Mondal | 6 | Top 14 |
| The Amazing Apsaras | 7 | 1st |
| Hidden Fire Crew | 8 | 3rd |
| Sound of Souls x Gaurash | 9 | 2nd |
| Cali Boys | 10 | Top 14 |
| Dhanraj and Gayatri | 11 | Top 14 |
| V Company | 12 | Top 14 |
| K. Vignesh | 13 | Top 14 |
| The Hillphonics | 14 | Top 14 |

== Episodes ==
| Ep. No. | Title | Event | Air date | Guest(s) |
|---|---|---|---|---|
| 1 | "Hindustan Ka Hunar" | Auditions 1 | 4 October 2025 | —N/a |
| 2 | "India's Incredible Talent" | Auditions 2 | 5 October 2025 | —N/a |
| 3 | "Spine-Chilling Acts | Auditions 3 | 11 October 2025 | —N/a |
| 4 | "Heartwarming Performances" | Auditions 4 | 12 October 2025 | —N/a |
| 5 | "Where Talent Meets Magic" | Auditions 5 | 18 October 2025 | —N/a |
| 6 | "Exceptional Skills, Remarkable Talent" | Auditions 6 | 19 October 2025 | —N/a |
| 7 | "Aar Ya Paar - Part 1" | Spotlight (Judge Cuts) | 25 October 2025 | Maahi, Soham and Raadhika Mukherjee (Shaan's family) |
| 8 | "Aar Ya Paar - Part 2" | Spotlight (Judge Cuts) | 26 October 2025 | Salim Merchant |
| 9 | "Josh Aur Junoon" | Auditions 7 | 1 November 2025 | Anu Malik |
| 10 | "Himmat Aur Sahas" | Auditions 8 | 2 November 2025 | Anu Malik |
| 11 | "Tadakte Bhadakte Acts" | Auditions 9 | 8 November 2025 | —N/a |
| 12 | "Kuch Anokha Karne Ka Junoon" | Auditions 10 | 9 November 2025 | Shehnaaz Gill |
| 13 | "Record Breaking Performances" | Auditions 11 | 15 November 2025 | Mika Singh |
| 14 | "Aaj Tutenge Records" | Auditions 12 | 16 November 2025 | Riteish Deshmukh, Vivek Oberoi and Aftab Shivdasani |
| 15 | "Sunhere Sapno Ka Shikhar" | Judge Cuts | 22 November 2025 | Ravie Dubey and Sargun Mehta |
| 16 | "A Showcase Of Sheer Mastery" | Judge Cuts | 23 November 2025 | Ravie Dubey and Sargun Mehta |
| 17 | "Chunky Panday Special" | Auditions 13 | 29 November 2025 | Chunky Panday |
| 18 | "Kriti Sanon Special" | Auditions 14 | 30 November 2025 | Chunky Panday and Kriti Sanon |
| 19 | "Sur Aur Talent Ka Mahasangam - Part 1" | Auditions 15 | 6 December 2025 | Vishal Dadlani and Shreya Ghoshal |
| 20 | "Sur Aur Talent Ka Mahasangam - Part 2" | Auditions 16 | 7 December 2025 | Vishal Dadlani and Shreya Ghoshal |
| 21 | "Battle Of Existence - Part 1" | Knockout (Judge Cuts) | 13 December 2025 | —N/a |
| 22 | "Battle Of Existence - Part 2" | Knockout (Judge Cuts) | 14 December 2025 | —N/a |
| 23 | "Semi-Final Ki Jung - Part 1" | Semi-final 1 | 20 December 2025 | —N/a |
| 24 | "Semi-Final Ki Jung - Part 2" | Semi-final 1 | 21 December 2025 | —N/a |
| 25 | "Dhamakedar Saat Din" | Semi-final 2 | 27 December 2025 | Pulkit Samrat, Shalini Pandey and Varun Sharma |
| 26 | "Sangharsh Se Shoharat" | Semi-final 2 | 28 December 2025 | Pulkit Samrat, Shalini Pandey and Varun Sharma |
| 27 | "Ajab Gazab Finale" | Final | 4 January 2026 | Karishma Kapoor, Emran Hashmi, Sharad Kelkar, Zoya Afroz, Kunal Kapur, Ranveer Brar, Vikas Khanna |
