= Sagar Bhatia =

Indian Qawwali singer and composer

- Born: Delhi, India
- Education: DAV MausamVihar; Ramjas College Religion: Islam
- Occupations: Qawwali singer & composer, guitarist
- Years active: 2005–present

Sagar Bhatia is an Indian Qawwali singer and composer based in Delhi, India. He is known for his renditions of popular tracks such as Kiven Mukhre Ton, Tere Jeya Hor Disda, and Je Tu Akhiyaan, as well as his original single Mera Ishq. His qawwali track Khudaya has been featured in the Akshay Kumar film Sarfira.

== Early life and education ==
Born and raised in Delhi, Sagar Bhatia is the son of the late Rakesh Bhatia, a businessman, and Kiran Bhatia, a teacher. He completed his schooling at DAV Public School, Mausam Vihar, and pursued higher education at Ramjas College.

== Career ==
Bhatia began his musical career in 2007 in Mumbai, where he played guitar for renowned singer Narendra Chanchal. He also performed in dance bars in Malaysia and Dubai. Returning to India in 2010, he formed a band and served as the lead guitarist. By 2011, he began singing in Chandigarh.

His breakthrough came in 2014 when he participated in the TV show India's Raw Star, where he placed among the top six contestants. In 2015, Bhatia established his company, Right Note, focusing on Sufi music. His first public qawwali performance under the moniker Sagar Wali Qawwali took place on 2 July 2022, at Studio XO.

Known for his recreations of popular melodies such as Kiven Mukhre Ton, Tere Jeya Hor Disda, and Je Tu Akhiyaan, Bhatia also released his original single Mera Ishq.

Bhatia has collaborated with Karan Johar through Dharma Cornerstone Agency and made his playback singing debut in the Akshay Kumar film Sarfira. The film has featured his qawwali track Khudaya, as reported by Bollywood Hungama. Sagar Bhatia also runs Sagar Bhatia’s Riyaaz, where he mentors aspiring musicians.

== Discography ==
=== Film ===
- Sarfira (2024)
- De De Pyaar De 2 (2025)

== Awards ==
- 2027: Popular Music Maestro of The Year at The Blackswan Awards, and Best Live Act on Stage.
