= Anita Hassanandani =

Indian actress (born 1981)

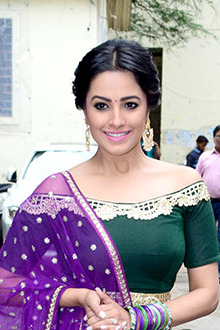
- Hassanandani in 2017
- Born: Natasha Hassanandani; 14 April 1981 (age 45); Bombay, Maharashtra, India
- Other names: Natassha; Anita Hassanandani Reddy
- Occupation: Actress
- Years active: 1998–present
- Spouse: Rohit Reddy (m. 2013)
- Children: 1

Natasha Hassanandani (pronounced [əˈniːt̪a ˈɦəsənənˈd̪aːni]; born 14 April 1981), known professionally as Anita Hassanandani or also simply as Natassha, is an Indian actress who predominantly works in Hindi and Telugu films and Hindi television. She made her acting debut in the television series Idhar Udhar (1998) and had her film debut with the Telugu film Nuvvu Nenu (2001), a commercial success. Hassanandani is known for her roles in Kkavyanjali, Kyunki Saas Bhi Kabhi Bahu Thi, Yeh Hai Mohabbatein and Naagin 3. She has established herself as one of the leading ladies of Indian television, winning numerous awards for acting and style.

== Early life ==
Hassanandani was born as Natasha Hassanandani, into a Sindhi Hindu family in Bombay (now Mumbai) on 14 April 1981.

== Career ==
=== Debut and success in South Indian films (1998–2004) ===
Hassanandani made her acting debut with the television series Idhar Udhar in 1998, where she played Anushka. It was followed by a special appearance in the Hindi film Taal, in 1999. In 2000, she appeared in the series Hare Kanch Ki Choodiyan. Hassanandani made her film debut with the Telugu film Nuvvu Nenu (2001) opposite Uday Kiran. The film was commercial success. Jeevi of Idlebrain noted, "Anita looks the part and gives a decent performance." From 2001 to 2002, she played Tanushree in Kabhii Sautan Kabhii Sahelii.

In 2002, Hassanandani appeared in four films. She first made her Tamil film debut with Varushamellam Vasantham opposite Manoj Bharathiraja. Malathi Rangarajan of The Hindu stated, "Anita, the new find, looks charming, with expressive eyes." Her other releases that year were: Samurai with Vikram, Sreeram with Uday Kiran and Thotti Gang with Prabhu Deva.

Hassanandani expanded to Hindi films in 2003 with Kucch To Hai opposite Tusshar Kapoor, which was a box office failure. Her next release, Yeh Dil, reunited her with Tusshar Kapoor but failed at the box office too. Priya Ganapati of Rediff.com stated that she gave a "reasonably good performance". Her performance in both these films earned her nomination for Zee Cine Award for Best Female Debut. Following this, Hassanandani appeared in three Telugu films: Ninne Ishtapaddanu, Aadanthe Ado Type with Aryan Rajesh, and Nenu Pelliki Ready with Srikanth. A critic from The Hindu was appreciative of her performance in the latter. That year, she also played Kareena in the series Kohi Apna Sa.

Hassanandani started 2004 with the series Lavanya, where she played Samira and had a special appearance in Nenunnanu. Following this, she played the lead opposite Sohail Khan in Krishna Cottage. Shilpa Bharatan Iyer of Rediff.com stated, "Natassha has done reasonable jobs with the script she have been given." In her last release of the year, she played the lead opposite Puneeth Rajkumar in Veera Kannadiga, her Kannada debut. The film emerged a major commercial success and proved her breakthrough.

=== Television breakthrough and career expansion (2005–2012) ===
Hassanandani's career marked a turning point in 2005, with Kkavyanjali. She played Anjali "Anjum" Salve Nanda, a middle-class girl marrying into a business tycoon's family opposite Rakshak Sahni and Eijaz Khan. The series earned her success and she won the Indian Telly Award for Best Actress for her performance. In the same year, she appeared in the Tamil film Sukran with Ravi Krishna, and the Hindi films Silsiilay and Koi Aap Sa. In Koi Aap Sa, Hassanandani played a rape survivor opposite Aftab Shivdasani. Taran Adarsh noted: "After making an impact in Silsiilay earlier this year, Natassha gets an author-backed role and the actor is only getting better, more dependable. A sincere performance, it stands out mainly because she handles it most naturally."

In 2006, Hassanandani appeared in her second Kannada film Gandugali Kumara Rama, opposite Shiva Rajkumar. R G Vijayasarathy stated the she "shines" among the actresses. In 2007, she first played Swati Bhatia in Kayamath and then appeared in the Hindi films: Dus Kahaniyaan and Just Married. From 2007 to 2008, she played Sanchi Virani in Kyunki Saas Bhi Kabhi Bahu Thi opposite Naman Shaw. Following her supporting parts in the series Kasamh Se, Kya Dill Mein Hai and Kis Desh Mein Hai Meraa Dil, Hassanandani played Draupadi in the 2008 series Kahaani Hamaaray Mahaabhaarat Ki. In the same year, she participated in the first season of Khatron Ke Khiladi. Later, she appeared in the Tamil film Nayagan.

In 2009, Hassanandani hosted Comedy Circus Ka Jadoo. Her only film release of the year was Ek Se Bure Do opposite Arshad Warsi. She then played the lead Anahita Mallik in Anhoniyon Ka Andhera, from 2010 to 2011. In 2010, Hassanandani appeared in the Hindi film Benny and Babloo, Kannada film Huduga Hudugi and had a special appearance in the Telugu film Ragada. In 2011, she played supporting parts in the series: Gutur Gu 2, Ek Hazaaron Mein Meri Behna Hai and had an episodic appearance in Teri Meri Love Stories. In the same year, she also appeared in the Tamil film Maharaja and the Telugu film Aha Naa Pellanta!, which was a commercial success. In 2012, she appeared in an episode of Lakhon Mein Ek, hosted Pyaar Tune Kya Kiya and had a special appearance in Genius.

=== Established actress (2013–2020) ===
Hassanandani established herself among the leading actresses of Hindi television with her portrayal of Shagun Arora Raghav in Yeh Hai Mohabbatein opposite Sumeet Sachdev and Karan Patel. She played the character from 2013 to 2019 and earned four consecutive Gold Award for Best Actress in a Negative Role for her performance. In 2013, she also played Sanya Nair in Madhubala – Ek Ishq Ek Junoon and appeared in the first episode of Yeh Hai Aashiqui as a married woman who falls in love with her student. She then made her Punjabi film debut with Yaaran Da Katchup in 2014 and in the same year she appeared in Ragini MMS 2, which was a box office success.

Hassanandani hosted Code Red in 2015. That year, she participated in Jhalak Dikhhla Jaa 8 as a wild card. Following this, she appeared in the Hindi film Hero. Alongside Yeh Hai Mohabbatein, she continued to play supporting parts in Bahu Hamari Rajni Kant, Trideviyaan and Sajan Re Phir Jhooth Mat Bolo. In 2016, she played a professor's wife in Manalo Okkadu opposite R. P. Patnaik. The film was a moderate success. A critic from 123telugu stated, "Anita makes a comeback and is perfect in her role. She does a neat job in emotional scenes and gives ample support to Patnaik."

From 2018 to 2019, Hassanandani played Vishakha, a shape-shifting serpent in Naagin 3 opposite Rajat Tokas. She received praises for her performance and earned several accolades. She made her web debut in 2018 with Galti Se Mis-Tech, playing a married woman caught in technological glitches opposite Rithvik Dhanjani. Sana Farzeen of The Indian Express was appreciative of her chemistry with Dhanjani and her portrayal. In 2019, she also participated in Nach Baliye 9 with her husband and emerged as the first runner-up. In 2020, she reprised her role as Vishakha in Naagin 4.

=== Hiatus and comeback (2021–present) ===
Following a small hiatus due to her pregnancy, Hassanandani made her comeback with the Hindi film Maarrich opposite Tusshar Kapoor, where she played a police officer's wife.

Hassanandani returned to television after three years with Hum Rahe Na Rahe Hum, where she played Roshni Sahni opposite Jay Bhanushali. From September 2024 to April 2025, she is seen portraying Devika Gupta Mittal in Suman Indori opposite Aman Sharma. Since May 2026, she playing Rajnandini in Zee TV's Tumm Se Tumm Tak.

== Personal life ==
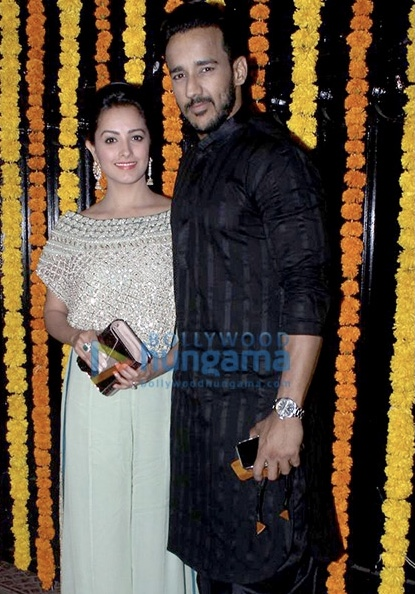
Hassanandani and her husband Rohit Reddy at Ekta Kapoor's Diwali party.

Hassanandani married corporate professional Rohit Reddy in Goa on 14 October 2013. On 10 October 2020, she announced her pregnancy in an Instagram video featuring Reddy and herself. The couple had their first child, a boy, on 9 February 2021. They named their son as Aaravv Reddy.

== Filmography ==
=== Film ===
Year	Title	Role	Language	Notes	Ref.
1999	Taal	Mansi's friend	Hindi		
2001	Nuvvu Nenu	Vasundhara "Vasu"	Telugu		
2002	Varushamellam Vasantham	Latha / Anarkali	Tamil		
2002	Samurai	Deiva	Tamil		
2002	Sreeram	Madhulatha "Madhu"	Telugu		
2002	Thotti Gang	Venkata Lakshmi	Telugu		
2003	Kucch To Hai	Natasha "Tashu"	Hindi		
2003	Yeh Dil	Vasundhara Pratap Singh	Hindi		
2003	Ninne Ishtapaddanu	Sanjana "Sanju"	Telugu		
2003	Aadanthe Ado Type	Brinda	Telugu		
2003	Nenu Pelliki Ready	Savithri	Telugu		
2004	Veera Kannadiga	Chitra	Kannada		
2004	Nenunnanu	Market flower selling girl	Telugu	Special appearance in the song "Ryali Ravulupadu"	
2004	Krishna Cottage	Shanti	Hindi		
2004	Santhosha	Anita	Kannada		
2005	Sukran	Sandhya	Tamil		
2005	Silsiilay	Piya Mahajan	Hindi		
2005	Koi Aap Sa	Simran "Simi" Ghosh	Hindi		
2006	Gandugali Kumara Rama	Ratna	Kannada		
2007	Dus Kahaniyaan	Simran	Hindi	Story: "Gubbare"	
2007	Just Married	Amrita	Hindi		
2008	Idi Sangathi	—N/a	Telugu	Special appearance in song	
2008	Nayagan	Nila	Tamil		
2009	Ek Se Bure Do	Payal	Hindi		
2010	Benny and Babloo	Esha / Sarita	Hindi		
2010	Huduga Hudugi		Kannada		
2010	Ragada	Banker	Telugu	Cameo appearance	
2011	Maharaja		Tamil		
2011	Aha Naa Pellanta!	Madhu	Telugu		
2012	Genius	—N/a	Telugu	Special appearance in song "Dibari Dibari"	
2014	Ragini MMS 2	Gina	Hindi		
2014	Yaaran Da Katchup	Simrat	Punjabi		
2015	Hero	Ruchi Mathur	Hindi		
2016	Manalo Okkadu	Krishnamurthy's wife	Telugu		
2022	Maarrich	Sushmita Dixit	Hindi		
2025	Oh Bhama Ayyo Rama	Meenakshi	Telugu		

=== Television ===
Year	Title	Role	Notes	Ref.
1998	Idhar Udhar	Anushka		
2000	Hare Kanch Ki Choodiyan	Nisha		
2001–2002	Kabhii Sautan Kabhii Sahelii	Tanushree "Tanu"		
2003	Kohi Apna Sa	Kareena		
2004	Lavanya	Samira		
2005–2006	Kkavyanjali	Anjali / Anjum		
2007	Kayamath	Swati Bhatia / Preeti		
2007–2008	Kyunki Saas Bhi Kabhi Bahu Thi	Sanchi Virani		
2008	Kya Dill Mein Hai	Tapur		
2008	Kahaani Hamaaray Mahaabhaarat Ki	Draupadi		
2008–2009	Kasamh Se	Anupam Kapadia		
2008	Kis Desh Mein Hai Meraa Dil	Shruti		
2008	Fear Factor: Khatron Ke Khiladi 1	Contestant	9th place	
2009	Dancing Queen	Contestant	3rd place	
2009	Comedy Circus Ka Jadoo	Host		
2010	Anhoniyon Ka Andhera	Anahita Mallik		
2011	Teri Meri Love Stories	Simran Sharma		
2011	Gutur Gu 2	Anita Ahuja		
2011	Ek Hazaaron Mein Meri Behna Hai	Paridhi		
2012–2014	Pyaar Tune Kya Kiya	Host		
2012–2014	Pyaar Tune Kya Kiya	Pari		
2012	Lakhon Mein Ek	Neelam Kapoor		
2013	Madhubala – Ek Ishq Ek Junoon	Sanya Nair		
2013	Yeh Hai Aashiqui	Priyanka		
2013–2019	Yeh Hai Mohabbatein	Shagun Arora/Shagun Raghav		
2014	MTV Fanaah	Preet / Dr. Yamini		
2014–2015	Box Cricket League 1	Contestant		
2015	Code Red	Host		
2015	Jhalak Dikhhla Jaa 8	Contestant	5th place	
2015	Comedy Classes	Contestant		
2015–2017	Comedy Nights Bachao	Contestant		
2016	Bahu Hamari Rajni Kant	Priya		
2016	Box Cricket League 2	Contestant		
2017	Trideviyaan	Mohini Iyer		
2018	Sajan Re Phir Jhooth Mat Bolo	Jaya		
2018	Box Cricket League 3	Contestant		
2018	Comedy Dangal	Contestant		
2018	Comedy Circus	Contestant		
2018–2019	Naagin 3	Vishakha		
2019	Box Cricket League 4	Contestant		
2019	Nach Baliye 9	Contestant	1st runner-up	
2020	Naagin 4	Vishakha		
2023	Naagin 6	Vishakha		
2023	Hum Rahein Na Rahein Hum	Roshni Sahni		
2024–2025	Suman Indori	Devika Gupta Mittal		
2025	Chhoriyan Chali Gaon	Winner		
2026–present	Tumm Se Tumm Tak	Rajnandini		
2026 –	Indian Game Show	Contestant		

==== Special appearances ====
Year	Title	Role	Ref.
2005	Kasautii Zindagii Kay	Anjali	
2006	Kumkum – Ek Pyara Sa Bandhan	Anjali	
2006	Kahaani Ghar Ghar Kii	Anjali	
2006	Karam Apnaa Apnaa	Anjali	
2011	Kitchen Champion 4	Herself	
2016	Krishnadasi	Herself	
2016	Bigg Boss 9	Herself	
2016	Bigg Boss 10	Herself	
2017	Bigg Boss 11	Herself	
2018	Bigg Boss 12	Herself	
2019	Khatra Khatra Khatra	Herself	
2019	Kitchen Champion 5	Herself	
2020	Naagin 5	Vishakha	
2021	Bigg Boss 15	Herself	
2022	Naagin: Basant Panchami Special	Vishakha	
2022	Good Night India	Herself	
2023	The Kapil Sharma Show	Herself	
2024	Laughter Chefs – Unlimited Entertainment	Devika	
2026	Naagin 7	Vishakha	

=== Web series ===
Year	Title	Role	Notes	Ref.
2018	Galti Se Mis-Tech	Dhara Sehgal	ALT Balaji's series	

=== Music videos ===
Year	Title	Singer	Ref.
2019	Teri Yaad	Rahat Fateh Ali Khan	
2019	Peerh Meri	Pearl V Puri	

=== Discography ===
Year	Film	Song	Composer	Ref.
2016	Fuddu	"Fuddu - Title Track"	Rana Majumdar, Sumeet Bellary	

== Awards and nominations ==
Year	Award	Category	Work	Result	Ref.
2004	Zee Cine Awards	Best Female Debut	Kucch To Hai & Yeh Dil	Nominated	
2005	Indian Telly Awards	Best Actress in a Lead Role	Kkavyanjali	Nominated	
2005	Indian Telly Awards	Best Onscreen Couple (with Eijaz Khan)	Kkavyanjali	Won	
2006	Indian Telly Awards	Best Actress in a Lead Role	Kkavyanjali	Won	
2006	Stardust Awards	Breakthrough Performance – Female	Silsiilay	Nominated	
2014	Indian Telly Awards	Best Actress in a Negative Role	Yeh Hai Mohabbatein	Nominated	
2014	Gold Awards	Best Actress in a Negative Role	Yeh Hai Mohabbatein	Won	
2015	Gold Awards	Best Actress in a Negative Role	Yeh Hai Mohabbatein	Won	
2015	Indian Television Academy Awards	Best Actress in a Negative Role	Yeh Hai Mohabbatein	Won	
2016	Gold Awards	Best Actress in a Negative Role	Yeh Hai Mohabbatein	Won	
2017	Gold Awards	Best Actress in a Negative Role	Yeh Hai Mohabbatein	Won	
2019	Gold Awards	Best Actress in a Supporting Role	Naagin 3	Nominated	
2019	Gold Awards	Best Actress in a Supporting Role – Jury	Naagin 3	Won	
2019	Indian Telly Awards	Best Actress in a Supporting Role	Naagin 3	Won	
2025	Indian Telly Awards	Fan Favorite – Negative Actress	Suman Indori	Won	
2025	Indian Telly Awards	Fan Favorite Star – Colors TV	Suman Indori	Nominated	

== See also ==
- List of Hindi television actresses
- List of Indian television actresses
