= Anhoniyon Ka Andhera =

- Genre: Horror
- Written by: Vikram Bhatt
- Directed by: Vikram Bhatt; Bhushan Patel
- Starring: Anita Hassanandani; Ajay Chaudhary
- Country of origin: India
- Original language: Hindi
- No. of seasons: 1
- No. of episodes: 18

Production
- Executive producer: Kshipra Darekar
- Producer: Jessu George
- Cinematography: Pawan Choudhary
- Editor: Jay B. Ghadiali
- Camera setup: Multi-camera
- Running time: Approx. 52 minutes
- Production company: ASA Productions & Enterprises

Original release
- Network: Colors TV
- Release: 26 February – 9 July 2011

Anhoniyon Ka Andhera is an Indian television horror series that premiered on 26 February 2011 on Colors. It ended on 9 July 2011. The series is produced by Bollywood film producer Vikram Bhatt, and each story of the show revolves around Anahita Malik, a girl who has supernatural powers. Vikram Bhatt film Haunted 3D stars Mahaakshay Chakraborty and Tia Bajpai also made their appearance on 30 April 2011 to promote their film.

== Cast ==
- Anita Hassanandani ... Anahita
- Ajay Chaudhary ... Rohan
- Nayan Bhatt ... Veteran
- Mohit Malhotra ... Vishal
