= Gauahar Khan =

Indian actress (born 1983)

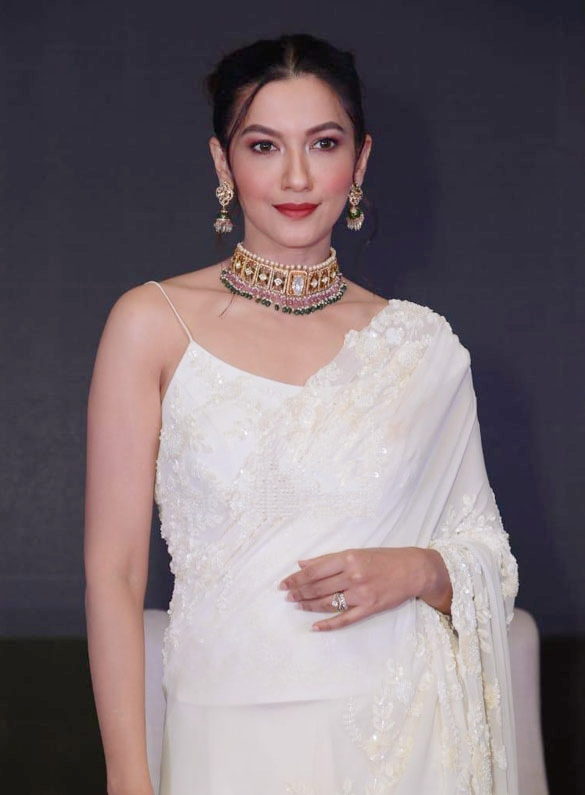
- Khan in 2021
- Born: Gauahar Zafar Khan; 23 August 1983 (age 43); Pune, Maharashtra, India
- Occupations: Actress; model
- Years active: 2003–present
- Notable work: Bigg Boss 7
- Spouse: Zaid Darbar (m. 2020)
- Children: 2
- Relatives: Nigaar Khan (sister); Ismail Darbar (father-in-law)

Gauahar Zafar Khan (born 23 August 1983) is an Indian actress, model and beauty pageant titleholder. She started her career as a model and participated in the Femina Miss India contest in 2002. She was the winner of Bigg Boss season 7 in 2013. Khan also appeared in Hindi films and television. After appearing in dance songs, Khan made her acting debut with Yash Raj Films's Rocket Singh: Salesman of the Year (2009). Khan later starred in films such as the action thriller Game (2011), the revenge drama Ishaqzaade (2012), the suspense thriller Fever (2016), the period drama Begum Jaan (2017) and the romantic comedy 14 Phere (2021).

== Early life ==
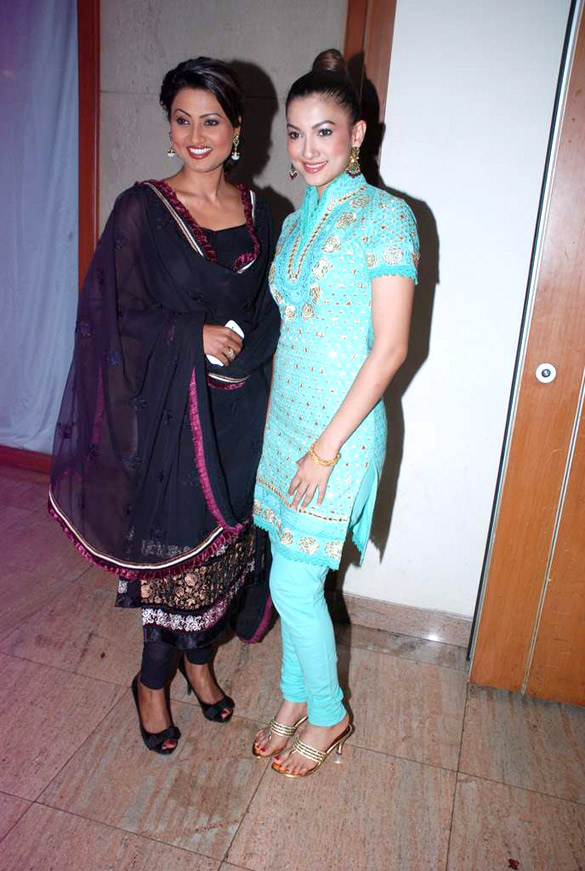
Nigaar Khan with sister Gauahar Khan in 2011

Gauahar Zafar Khan was born on 23 August 1983 in a Muslim family in Pune, Maharashtra to Zafar and Razia Khan. She completed her schooling from Mount Carmel Convent School, Pune. She is the youngest of five siblings and the sister of actress Nigaar Khan.

== Career ==
Khan in 2018

Khan started her career as a model. In 2002, at the age of 18, she participated in Femina Miss India contest where she came fourth and won the Miss Talented title. Later that year, she represented India in the Miss International 2002 contest. Khan appeared in a small role in movie Miss India: The Mystery as a model participant.

She appeared in a couple of music videos one of which, "Hawa Mein Udati Jaaye" by Bombay Vikings, became hugely popular. She anchored the film gossip show Page 3 on Zoom Television. In 2004, Khan made her entry in Bollywood with two films, Aan: Men at Work and Shankar Dada M.B.B.S., a Telugu film in item songs.

In February 2009, she participated in Sony TV's celebrity dance reality show, Jhalak Dikhhla Jaa 3 where she became the first runner up of the show. She made her acting debut in the 2009 Yash Raj Films production Rocket Singh: Salesman of the Year. Anupama Chopra said, "Gauahar was fashionable, ambitious and smart receptionist, she was sharply etched and memorable as Koena in the film". In 2010, Khan appeared in Ekta Kapoor's Once Upon a Time in Mumbaai in an item number, "Parda".

Khan next appeared as outspoken and rebellious Samara Shroff in the action thriller Game (2011). NDTV said that "Gauhar as the loyal secretary Samara is nicely outfitted." Later in the year, along with her sister Nigaar Khan, Gauahar appeared in the reality show, The Khan Sisters. Khan played Chand Bibi in the 2012 romantic drama Ishaqzaade, in which she also appeared in two item numbers "Jhalla Walla" and "Chokra Jawaan". Shomini Sen of Zee News stated that, "Gauahar as a kind-hearted prostitute Chand sizzles in two songs. It is pity that she is used so less in the film.". Taran Adarsh said, "Gauahar is lovely in a special role. Also, she dances very well in the two tracks."

In 2013, Khan became a celebrity contestant in the seventh season of Colors TV's reality show Bigg Boss, an Indian version of the reality TV show Big Brother. Khan took an exit after her boyfriend Kushal Tandon was asked to leave after he hit VJ Andy. A day later she returned to the house. She emerged as the winner in December 2013 defeating actress Tanishaa Mukerji.

In May 2014, Khan participated in Colors TV's stunt show Fear Factor: Khatron Ke Khiladi in its fifth season along with Kushal Tandon.

She later was a mentor for a reality show, Ticket To Bollywood. In September 2014, Khan hosted Star Plus's singing reality show India's Raw Star. On 30 November 2014, Khan was slapped during the shooting of a singing reality show called India's Raw Star by a member of the audience who admonished her for wearing a short dress. Police arrested 24-year-old Akil Malik for attacking the actress at show's studio in Mumbai. They quoted the man as telling Khan that "being a Muslim woman, she should not have worn such a short dress". He was later produced in court on 1 December 2014.

In May 2015, Khan made her Punjabi debut with the film Oh Yaara Ainvayi Ainvayi Lut Gaya, opposite Jassie Gill as Gunjan Kaur. In October 2015, Khan participated in Zee TV's I Can Do That and was paired along with Bani J. Khan emerged as the first runner-up whilist Rithvik Dhanjani emerged as the winner. In January 2016, Khan started the year with appearing in Ekta Kapoor's Kyaa Kool Hain Hum 3 for the item song "Jawani Le Doobi". In August 2016, Khan played one of the main leads in Ravi Agrawal's Fever, co-starring Rajeev Khandelwal and Gemma Atkinson as Kavya. The film released in August however failed at the box office. In October 2016, Khan appeared in the film Fuddu for an item song, sung by Jasmine Sandlas.

In 2017, Khan appeared in Karan Johar's Badrinath Ki Dulhania, the sequel to Humpty Sharma Ki Dulhania, starring Varun Dhawan and Alia Bhatt as Laxmi. The film released in March. In April 2017, Khan acted in the film Begum Jaan, co-starring Vidya Balan. In December 2017, Khan acted in Tera Intezaar. In 2018, she acted in Nine Hours in Mumbai as Gulabi.

In June 2019, Khan appeared in the Indian version of The Office, an adaptation of the hit BBC series of the same name. The show was released on the streaming service Hotstar on 28 June 2019. Khan played Riya Pahwa, the boss of the lead character Jagadeep Chadda. Later that year, she appeared in a web series, Parchayee.

In 2020, she returned to Bigg Boss as a toofani senior for its fourteenth season along with Hina Khan and Sidharth Shukla for the first three weeks. In 2021, Gauahar played the role of Maithili Sharan in amazon web series Tandav.

== Personal life ==
Khan was in a relationship with Kushal Tandon, her Bigg Boss 7 co-contestant in 2013, but later they broke up.

In November 2020, she got engaged to actor Zaid Darbar, son of music director Ismail Darbar. The two were married on 25 December 2020. On 20 December 2022, she announced on instagram that they were expecting their first child together. On 10 May 2023, she gave birth to a son, Zehaan. Their second son, Farwaan, was born on 1 September 2025.

== Filmography ==
=== Films ===
| Year | Title | Role | Notes |
|---|---|---|---|
| 2004 | Aan: Men at Work | | Special appearance in song "Nasha" |
| 2004 | Shankar Dada M.B.B.S. | | Telugu film; Special appearance in song "Naa Pera Kanchan Mala" |
| 2009 | Rocket Singh: Salesman of the Year | Koena Sheikh | |
| 2010 | Once Upon a Time in Mumbaai | | Special appearance in song "Parda" |
| 2011 | Game | Samara Shroff/Natasha Malhotra | |
| 2012 | Ishaqzaade | Chand Bibi | |
| 2015 | Oh Yaara Ainvayi Ainvayi Lut Gaya | Gunjan Kaur | Punjabi film |
| 2016 | Kyaa Kool Hain Hum 3 | | Special appearance in song "Jawaani Le Doobi" |
| 2016 | Fever | Kavya Chaoudhary/Pooja Warrier | |
| 2016 | Fuddu | | Special appearance in song "Curves Mere Killerrr Killerrr" |
| 2017 | Badrinath Ki Dulhania | Laxmi Shankar | Cameo |
| 2017 | Begum Jaan | Rubina | |
| 2017 | Tera Intezaar | | Special appearance in song "Barbie" |
| 2018 | Nine Hours in Mumbai | Gulabi | |
| 2021 | 14 Phere | Zubina | |
| TBA | Ikroop † | TBA | Filming |

=== Television ===
| Year | Title | Role | Notes |
|---|---|---|---|
| 2002 | Bitches & Beauty Queens: The Making of Miss India | Herself | British Television Documentary film |
| 2009 | Jhalak Dikhhla Jaa 3 | Contestant | 1st runner-up |
| 2011 | The Khan Sisters | Herself | |
| 2013 | Bigg Boss 7 | Contestant | Winner |
| 2014 | Khatron Ke Khiladi 5 | Contestant | 8th place |
| 2014 | Ticket to Bollywood | Mentor | |
| 2014 | India's Raw Star | Host | |
| 2015 | I Can Do That | Contestant | 4th place |
| 2019 | The Office | Riya Pahwa | |
| 2020 | Bigg Boss 14 | Senior | 2 weeks |
| 2023–2024 | Jhalak Dikhhla Jaa 11 | Host | |
| 2024 | Fauji 2 | Lieutenant Colonel Simarjeet Kaur | |

==== Special appearances ====
| Year | Title | Role |
|---|---|---|
| 2014 | Bigg Boss 8 | Herself |
| 2016 | Naagin 1 | Herself |
| 2016 | Bigg Boss 10 | Herself |
| 2017 | Bigg Boss 11 | Herself |
| 2018 | Bigg Boss 12 | Herself |
| 2018 | Naagin 3 | Herself |
| 2019 | Gathbandhan | Herself |
| 2019 | Bigg Boss 13 | Herself |

=== Web series ===
| Year | Title | Role | Notes | Ref. |
|---|---|---|---|---|
| 2019 | Parchhayee | Unnamed | Episode 9 | |
| 2021 | Tandav | Maithili Sharan | | |
| 2022 | Bestseller | Mayanka Kapoor | | |
| 2022 | Salt City | Gunjan Bajpai | | |
| 2022 | Shiksha Mandal | Anuradha Singh Shrivastava | | |
| 2024–2025 | Lovely Lolla | Vaishnavi "Lolla" Chawla | | |

=== Music videos ===
| Year | Title | Singer | Ref. |
|---|---|---|---|
| 2021 | "Wapis" | Ali Brothers | |
| 2021 | "Tohmat" | Shipra Goyal | |
| 2021 | "Main Pyaar Mein Hoon" | Goldboy | |
| 2022 | "Dil Ka Gehna" | Yasser Desai | |
| 2022 | "Baarish Mein Tum" | Neha Kakkar, Rohanpreet Singh | |

== Awards and nominations ==
Nominated

- Most Promising Newcomer – Female for Rocket Singh: Salesman of the Year at Screen Awards in 2010
- Best Actor in a Supporting Role – Female for Rocket Singh: Salesman of the Year at Screen Awards in 2010
- Best Breakthrough Performance – Female for Rocket Singh: Salesman of the Year at Stardust Awards in 2010
- Best Actress in a Supporting Role for Ishaqzaade at Renault Star Guild Awards in 2013
- Best Supporting Actress for 14 Phere at IIFA Awards in 2022

== See also ==
- List of Indian film actresses

| Preceded by (India) Kanwal Toor | Femina Miss India International; 2002 | Succeeded by (India) Shonali Nagrani |
