= Cartel (TV series) =

2021 Hindi Web Series

- Genre: Crime; Action; Drama
- Screenplay by: Sambit Mishra; Monish Talpade
- Directed by: Ankkitha Maithy
- Starring: Tanuj Virwani; Supriya Pathak; Rithvik Dhanjani; Divya Agarwal; Jitendra Joshi; Monica Dogra; Samir Soni
- Country of origin: India
- Original language: Hindi
- No. of seasons: 1
- No. of episodes: 14

Production
- Producer: Ekta Kapoor
- Production location: India
- Cinematography: Rajiv Singh
- Editor: Prashant Panda
- Running time: 40 minutes
- Production company: Balaji Telefilms

Original release
- Network: AltBalaji
- Release: 20 August 2021

Cartel is an Indian streaming television series produced by Ekta Kapoor under the banner of Balaji Telefilms. It stars Supriya Pathak, Rithvik Dhanjani, Jitendra Joshi, Tanuj Virwani and Divya Agarwal. It was released on 20 August 2021.

== Plot ==
The story revolves around 5 gang-lords of Mumbai. Khan, Anna, Angre, Gajraj and a mysterious movie producer form 5 gangs who rule the low-profile underworld in the city of dreams. While all 5 gangs operate in different parts of the city, order and harmony is ensured only due to one Iron lady, Rani Maai who sits on a throne and looks over the smooth functioning of events.

== Cast ==
- Supriya Pathak as Rani Mai
- Rithvik Dhanjani as Abhay Angre
- Tanuj Virwani as Ex-Major Arjun Mhatre/ Major Bhau
- Divya Agarwal as Grizzey
- Jitendra Joshi as Madhukar Mhatre/ Madhu Mhatre
- Monica Dogra as Maya
- Samir Soni as Dorabjee
- Shubhrajyoti Barat as Gajraj
- Sushrii Mishra as Vaidehi
- Tannishtha Chatterjee as Romilla
- Girija Oak as Rama
- Pranati Rai Prakash as Sumi
- Krishna Kaul as Javed
- Aditi Vasudev as Shweta
- Mayur More as Chiru
- Gaurav Sharma as ACP Dixit
- Kannan Arunachalam as Anna
- Vibhav Roy
- Nabeel Ahmed
- Aanchal Goswami
- Amey Wagh as Dhawal
- Riya Subodh
- Sanaya Pithawalla as Shreya
- Mrinal Dutt as Yograj
- Anil George as Khan
- Ashwath Bhatt as Chairman
- Mrinal Das as Suraj

== Release ==
The official trailer of the web series was launched on 1 August 2021 by MX Player on YouTube.

== Reception ==
Joginder Tuteja for ABP News rated 4 stars out of 5 and wrote "Cartel is an impressive show and rest assured, the work would have begun on the sequel due to the inherent dramatic quotient that it carries. An epic gangster drama, it works immensely due to the family set up which makes it different from usual underworld affairs." Sukanya Verma of Rediff rated only 1 star out of 5 stars and wrote "There's no tension, no thrills, no logic, no humour, no darkness and not an iota of entertainment." Bharathi Pradhan for Lehren gave 3 stars out of 5 and wrote "A starlet’s death which evokes remarks that followed the suicide of a famous star last year, a birthday party held at gun point, a wedding anniversary, family celebrations and loss of lives at every turn, keep the story moving." Archika Khurana for The Times of India "In a nutshell, if the gang wars are your thing, ‘Cartel’ will provide plenty of murder, slaughter and gunfights."
