= Galti Se Mis-Tech =

- Genre: Comedy
- Created by: Ekta Kapoor
- Developed by: Ekta Kapoor
- Directed by: Puja Banerji; Ashutosh Matela
- Starring: Anita Hassanandani; Rithvik Dhanjani
- Country of origin: India
- Original languages: Hindi; English
- No. of seasons: 1
- No. of episodes: 10

Production
- Producers: Ekta Kapoor; Shobha Kapoor
- Production locations: Mumbai, India
- Camera setup: Multi-camera
- Running time: 5-6 minutes
- Production company: Balaji Telefilms

Original release
- Network: ALT Balaji
- Release: 7 April 2018

Galti Se Mis-Tech is a 2018 Hindi short web series, created by Ekta Kapoor for her video on demand platform ALTBalaji. The web series is about a happily sorted couple who love each other's company until a series of technological glitches causes small fights in their marriage.

The series is available for streaming on the ALT Balaji App and its associated websites since its release date.

== Plot ==
The series revolves around Shivam and Dhara, a generation Y couple with technology in their DNA. Their cute and fun relationship thrives on technologies and smartphones. They are sorted out and enjoy their company until a series of technological glitches turns their lovely bond into a complete madhouse. The series explores how the two of them go through this journey of technological savvy world with their cute fights.

== Cast ==
- Anita Hassanandani as Dhara Sehgal
- Rithvik Dhanjani as Shivam Chaturvedi

== List of Episodes ==
- Episode 1: Say Cheese
- Episode 2: Bhadwa Baigan
- Episode 3: I Wanna Exercise
- Episode 4: Thodi Cute Thodi Sweet
- Episode 5: Daru Daru Daru
- Episode 6: Hangover
- Episode 7: Happy & Gay
- Episode 8: Chaddi Ki Shaadi
- Episode 9: Bangkok Calling
- Episode 10: Season Finale: I am Hungry
