= De De Pyaar De 2 =

2025 Indian film by Anshul Sharma

- Theatrical release poster
- Directed by: Anshul Sharma
- Written by: Luv Ranjan; Tarun Jain
- Story by: Luv Ranjan
- Produced by: Bhushan Kumar; Krishan Kumar; Luv Ranjan; Ankur Garg
- Starring: Ajay Devgn; R. Madhavan; Rakul Preet Singh
- Cinematography: Sudhir K. Chaudhary
- Edited by: Chetan M. Solanki
- Music by: Songs: Yo Yo Honey Singh; Jaani; Aditya Dev–Payal Dev; Avvy Sra; Sagar Bhatia; Background Score: Hitesh Sonik
- Production companies: T-Series Films; Luv Films
- Distributed by: PVR Inox Pictures (India); Yash Raj Films (international)
- Release date: 14 November 2025
- Running time: 146 minutes
- Country: India
- Language: Hindi
- Budget: ₹150 crore
- Box office: est. ₹104.67 crore

De De Pyaar De 2 (transl. 'Give me love 2') is a 2025 Indian Hindi-language romantic comedy drama directed by Anshul Sharma, written by Luv Ranjan and Tarun Jain and produced by T-Series Films and Luv Films. A sequel to De De Pyaar De (2019), and the second and final instalment of a duology, it stars Ajay Devgn, R. Madhavan and Rakul Preet Singh in the lead roles. In the film, chaos ensues when a middle-aged NRI divorcé, who is dating a woman almost half his age, is introduced to her family; once her parents realize he might be older than themselves, they hatch a plan to split the couple, causing a rift between the parents and the daughter.

A sequel to De De Pyaar De was teased in its ending, and the sequel was officially announced in March 2024. Editor Akiv Ali, who made his directorial debut with the 2019 original, did not return to either edit or direct. Sharma, who had served as a creative producer on the prequel, among Ranjan's other films, was roped in to direct, while editor Chetan M. Solanki, who made his debut as principal editor alongside Ali in the prequel, reprised his duties. Principal photography commenced in June 2024, and was primarily held in Punjab and London.

De De Pyaar De 2 was theatrically released worldwide on 14 November 2025. It received mixed reviews from critics and underperformed at the box office, grossing est. ₹104.67 crore worldwide.

== Plot ==
Following the events of De De Pyaar De, 51-year-old London-based NRI investor Ashish Mehra decides to meet his 27-year-old girlfriend Ayesha Khurana's family to get their approval, after having previously received his own family's approval. However, Ayesha is perplexed about introducing Ashish when she learns her sister-in-law Kittu is pregnant. They arrive in Ayesha's town, with Ashish's friend Ronak also following soon. She initially confides about Ashish to Kittu, revealing her plans to break the news in the midst of the newborn baby's arrival, but her parents, Rakesh and Anju, who share the same nickname for each other, "Rajji", end up learning about it. They question Ayesha, who partly reveals the truth, intending to keep his real age a secret. Despite their progressive and modern outlook, the Rajjis become convinced she is hiding something, but agree to nonetheless meet Ashish.

However, tensions arise when they realise that Ashish is almost as old as Rakesh. The two confront Ayesha over her lie once they learn from a private investigator about his background, leading to Rakesh's disapproval of her relationship. In the midst of their argument, Kittu goes into labour. They rush her to the hospital where she gives birth to a girl. Later, they all attend a party where Rakesh beats up a man who was ogling Ayesha. Ayesha confronts Rakesh over the scene at the party and they have a huge argument, following which Ayesha leaves with Ashish. Eventually, Rakesh comes to Ashish's house and apologises to Ayesha, asking them both to come back. However, it is revealed that the parents have decided to do a 'coup de foudre' by hiring Ayesha's childhood friend Aditya to seduce her and drive her away from Ashish.

Aditya flirts continuously with Ayesha, and employs various ways to seduce her including taking her to a nightclub. He manages to make her fall in love with him and start a relationship with him. Ashish realises that this was Rakesh's plan and confronts him. He eventually relents and promises to not stop Ayesha from courting Aditya or get in their way. He also requests Rakesh to give Ayesha the life she deserves, if he is unable to do so. Eventually, Ashish walks in on Ayesha and Aditya passionately kissing. This saddens him and he prepares to go back to London along with Ronak. Ayesha tries to convince him to not leave and eventually yells at him for "not fighting for her". However, Ashish is not deterred and leaves. Saddened by his departure, and out of spite for him, she proposes to Aditya for marriage. A little while later, she calls Rounak and requests him to tell Ashish to send back her luggage as she is getting married. Eventually, the day of Ayesha and Aditya's wedding arrives. During the wedding, Rakesh notices that Ayesha was tearing up causing him to get emotional. Later, Anju, on a call with Rakesh, sees her crying and enquires what was wrong.

It is revealed in a flashback that Ayesha had then confronted Aditya over him trying to seduce her. He had then confessed to her that Rakesh had hired him to seduce her and he had no true feelings for her. She and Aditya had both pretended to be in love and she had never moved on from Ashish. She had also convinced Anju to help her persuade Rakesh to let her marry Ashish — her emotional conversation with Ayesha over her feelings towards Ashish and Aditya that Rakesh had overheard on the phone had actually been pre-planned by both of them.

Rakesh plans to go to London to get Ashish, but on reaching the airport receives a call from Ronak that Ashish is leaving for India to stop Ayesha's wedding and they both rush to the venue. Both of them repeatedly try to convince Ayesha to stop the marriage and marry Ashish instead. Eventually, she agrees and reveals the truth to Ashish about having faked her relationship with Aditya. She kisses him and the film concludes with Ashish informing Manju of his impending nuptials.

== Cast ==
- Ajay Devgn as Ashish "Ashu" Mehra
- R. Madhavan as Rakesh "Rajji" Khurana, Ayesha's father
- Rakul Preet Singh as Ayesha "Ayeshu" Khurana, Rajji's daughter
- Jaaved Jaaferi as Ronak Motla, Ashu's friend
- Meezaan Jafri as Aditya, Aishu's childhood friend
- Gautami Kapoor as Anju "Rajji" Khurana, Ayesha's mother
- Ishita Dutta as Kittu, Ayesha's sister-in-law
- Tarun Gehlot as Rohan Khurana, Ayesha's brother
- Sanjeev Seth as Kittu's father
- Suhasini Mulay as Naani, Anju's mother
- Gracy Goswami as Tia
- Jyoti Gauba as Aditya's mother
- Sameer Malhotra as Aditya's father
- Ekavali Khanna as Anita, Anju's sister
- Shiwangi Peswani as Mini
- Ankur Nayyar as Babbi, Rakesh's brother
- Anvesha Vij as Dia
- Meneka Arora as Kittu's mother
- Yo Yo Honey Singh as himself in the song "Jhoom Sharabi" (special appearance)

== Production ==
=== Development and casting ===
A potential script for a sequel to De De Pyaar De (2019) was finalized in August 2023, while the official announcement was made in March 2024. Anshul Sharma, who had served as a creative producer on the prequel, was announced as director, replacing editor Akiv Ali, who made his directorial debut with the prequel, with Ajay Devgn and Rakul Preet Singh reprising their roles. Anil Kapoor was initially signed to play Ayesha's father, but later opted out in favour of War 2 and was replaced by R. Madhavan. Editor Chetan M. Solanki, who made his principal debut alongside Ali on the prequel after having worked as his associate, returned to serve as editor. Choreography for the songs was handled by Raju Khan and Ganesh Acharya. Meezaan Jafri joined the cast, marking his first major collaboration with his father Jaaved Jaaferi, who also appeared in the prequel.

=== Filming ===
Principal photography commenced in June 2024 at Mehboob Studio, Mumbai, Maharashtra, with the next schedules set to happen in Punjab and London. The first Punjab schedule in Patiala was completed in September–October 2024 but ended early as Sharma contracted dengue fever. The second Punjab schedule of the film was started in January and completed in February 2025. During the filming, with half of the film complete, Singh suffered from a spinal injury that kept her bedridden for 40 days. She resumed shooting after a three-month break and completed the shooting lying on a physio bed.

== Soundtrack ==
De De Pyaar De 2

Soundtrack album by Yo Yo Honey Singh, Jaani, Aditya Dev–Payal Dev, Avvy Sra and Sagar Bhatia
- Released: 6 November 2025
- Recorded: 2024–2025
- Genre: Feature film soundtrack
- Length: 23:26
- Language: Hindi
- Label: T-Series
External audio
- Official Audio Jukebox on YouTube

The film's soundtrack was composed by Yo Yo Honey Singh, Jaani, Aditya Dev–Payal Dev, Avvy Sra and Sagar Bhatia, with lyrics written by Kumaar, Sagar Bhatia, Jaani, Karan Aujla and Yo Yo Honey Singh. The first single "Raat Bhar", a duet, was released on 22 October 2025. The second single "Jhoom Sharaabi" was released on 29 October 2025, which was recreated from the 1974 film 5 Rifles The third single "3 Shaukk" was released on 4 November 2025.

Track listing
No.	Title	Lyrics	Music	Singer(s)	Length
1.	"Raat Bhar"	Kumaar	Aditya Dev–Payal Dev	Aditya Rikhari, Payal Dev	3:12
2.	"Jhoom Sharabi"	Yo Yo Honey Singh	Yo Yo Honey Singh	Yo Yo Honey Singh, Athar Hayat, Sameer Hayat	4:14
3.	"3 Shaukk"	Karan Aujla, Jaani	Avvy Sra, Dj Chetas	Avvy Sra, Karan Aujla, Jyotica Tangri	3:00
4.	"Aakhri Salaam" (Sagar Bhatia Version)	Sagar Bhatia	Sagar Bhatia	Sagar Bhatia	4:49
5.	"Baabul Ve"	Kumaar	Aditya Dev–Payal Dev	Shreya Ghoshal	3:21
6.	"Aakhri Salaam"	Sagar Bhatia	Sagar Bhatia	Armaan Malik	4:50
Total length:					23:26

== Marketing ==
The trailer was launched on 14 October 2025 at an event organized in Devgn Cinex in Gurgaon. The film has been promoted on Bigg Boss 19. The official poster was launched on 11 October 2025. As part of the marketing campaign, the entire soundtrack album was released on 7 November 2025 by T-Series.

== Release ==
=== Theatrical ===
De De Pyaar De 2 was theatrically released worldwide on 14 November 2025. The film has been released by PVR Inox Pictures. The film was released in 4000 screens in total for a wide release. The film was released without any cuts from CBFC with U/A rating suitable for 13+ viewers as a family entertainer.

=== Pre-release business ===
The film registered decent advance bookings as part of its pre-release business. The film recorded over 16000 ticket sales in multiplex chains like PVR Inox and Cinepolis. These advance booking figures are lower as Rom-com genre films are finding it tough to get business in the post COVID-19 era.

=== Home media ===
The film began streaming on Netflix from 9 January 2026.

== Reception ==
=== Box office ===
The film had an opening day box office collection on 14 November 2025 of ₹8.75 crore with an opening weekend collection of ₹33.70 crore. After 3 weeks the film collected in India ₹81.90 crore and overseas collection stood at ₹21.29 crore for a total of est. ₹104.96 crore worldwide.

=== Review ===
On the review aggregator website Rotten Tomatoes, 55% of 11 critics' reviews are positive, with an average rating of 5.8/10.

Shubhra Gupta of The Indian Express gave 2.5 stars out of 5 and said that "If only the film didn’t resemble an extended sit-com, with a house where most of the action takes place not bothering to hide the fact that it is a set, the length making us restive." Radhika Sharma of NDTV rated it 3/5 stars and writes that "Age is the elephant in the room, a topic that the film doesn't brush under the carpet." Vineeta Kumar of India Today awarded 3 stars out of 5 and stated that "'De De Pyaar De 2' is a fun, breezy rom-com that combines humour, family drama and familiar charm. The casting is awkward, but the film doesn't disappoint."

Nandini Ramnath of Scroll.in observed that "Some judicious snipping might have taken care of the tonal inconsistency, while also better showcasing the sharp lines and charming tendency of characters to talk themselves into a corner. De De Pyaar De 2 is too much of a good thing." Anuj Kumar of The Hindu writes in his review that "Director Anshul Sharma rekindles the breezy energy of the original, but the fresh spin on ‘love vs loved ones’ becomes formulaic after a point." Kartik Bhardwaj of Cinema Express gave 2.5 stars out of 5 and said that "Watching De De Pyaar De 2 can be described as an experience of taking a rollercoaster ride, you start feeling the seats are wobbly once it slows down."

Devesh Sharma of Filmfare gave 3 stars out of 5 and said that " De De Pyaar De 2 is a rom com which says age doesn’t matter in affairs of the heart." Bollywood Hungama gave 4 stars out of 5 and said that "On the whole, DE DE PYAAR DE 2 impresses with its compelling performances, relatable narrative, and an entertaining fusion of humour and drama. At the box office, the film possesses strong prospects of sustaining and expanding its run over the weekend and thereafter, particularly if favourable word of mouth regarding its emotional quotient and comedic moments gains momentum." Rahul Desai of The Hollywood Reporter India observed that "The Luv Ranjan-written age-gap comedy is occasionally witty and intuitive, but it pushes too many buttons to make an impact."
