= I Can Do That (Indian TV series) =

- Genre: Reality
- Created by: Subhash Chandra
- Presented by: Farhan Akhtar
- Country of origin: India
- No. of seasons: 1

Production
- Producer: Subhash Chandra
- Production location: India
- Production company: Essel Vision Productions

Original release
- Network: Zee TV
- Release: 17 October – 22 November 2015

Related
- I Can Do That

I Can Do That is an Indian reality television series based on the American show of the same name. It was launched on 17 October 2015 on Zee TV. The series is produced by Essel Vision Productions. The series is the Indian adaptation of the American television series where participants would be challenged to showcase their skills on various tasks. The show is hosted by actor Farhan Akhtar.

== Contestants ==
- Madhurima Tuli
- Gauahar Khan
- Ranveer Brar
- VJ Bani
- Meiyang Chang
- VJ Andy
- Dino Morea
- Rithvik Dhanjani
- Shibani Dandekar
- Bharti Singh
- Gurmeet Choudhary
- Mandira Bedi

== Results ==
Rithvik Dhanjani was the winner.

Gauahar Khan was 1st runner- up.

Madhurima Tuli was the 2nd runner-up.

== See also ==
- Nach Baliye
- Dance India Dance
