= India's Got Talent season 8 =

India's Got Talent
- Season 8
- Promotional poster for season 8, featuring judges (L to R) judges Kher, Johar and Arora.
- Hosted by: Bharti Singh; Rithvik Dhanjani
- Judges: Kirron Kher; Karan Johar; Malaika Arora
- Winner: Javed Khan
- Runner-up: Live 100 Experience
- No. of episodes: 21

Release
- Original network: Colors TV
- Original release: 20 October – 29 December 2018

Season chronology
- ← Previous; Season 7 Next → Season 9

India's Got Talent season 8 started on 20 October 2018. Actress Malaika Arora Khan, director and producer Karan Johar, and veteran actress Kirron Kher returned as the judges. Bharti Singh returned to present the show. Rithvik Dhanjani also hosted the show.

Close-up magician Javed Khan was announced as the winner on 29 December 2018.

== Season cverview ==
The golden buzzer returned for its fourth season. The judges were given two golden buzzers this season. Also, for the first time, hosts were allowed to use the golden buzzer separately. The following table shows the acts which received the golden buzzer in the audition:

Kirron Kher	Karan Johar	Malaika Arora	Rithvik Dhanjani	Bharti Singh
North Eastern Chronicles; Choir Band	Show Stoppers Crew; Contemporary Dance Act	Bishnu Behra (Vishnu Prasad); Close-up Magician	Ramie Singh; Solo Dance Act	R G Rathod; Comedy & Stunt Act
Crazy Hoppers; Acrobatics Dance Group Act	Navneet Sundar & Rangapriya Sankaranarayan; Violin and Technology Music from iPad & Phones	S. Angels; Flexibility Dance Act	Ramie Singh; Solo Dance Act	R G Rathod; Comedy & Stunt Act

Of the participants who auditioned for this season, thirty-five secured a place in the semi-finals, with nine performing in each (except for the golden buzzer semi-final, were 8 performed). The following below lists the results of each participant's overall performance in this season:

Winner | Runner-up | Finalist | Semi-finalist |
Golden Buzzer - Auditions |
Golden Buzzer - Pre Finale |
Public Wildcard

Participant	Age(s)	Genre	Act	From	Semi-Final	Result
Sufi Nizami Brothers	18-38	Singing	Kavali Singing Group	New Delhi	1	Pre-finalist
Altmas Khan	25	Dance	Aerial Act	Mumbai	2	Grand-finalist
Bishnu Behra (Vishnu Prasad)	30	Magic	Close-up Magician	Bhubaneswar	4	Eliminated
Bidisha Mohanta	21	Singing	Singer	Mumbai	3	Pre-finalist
Mukesh Singh & Rahul Singh	20 & 23	Acrobatics	Acrobatic Balance Act	Sirsa	2	Grand-finalist
S. Angels	10-11	Dance	Flexibility Dance Act	Calcutta	4	Eliminated
Live 100 Experience	9-52	Singing	100 Members Band	Mumbai	3	Runner-up
North Eastern Chronicles	19-22	Singing	Choir Band	Guwahati	4	Eliminated
Ramie Singh	23	Dance	Solo Dance Act	Ranchi & Mumbai	4	Eliminated
R G Rathod	34	Comedy & Stunt	Comedy & Stunt Act	Nanded, Maharashtra	4	Eliminated
Javed Khan	27	Magic	Close-up Magician	Mumbai	3	Winner
Navneet & Rangapriya	34 & 20	Instrumental	Violin and Technology Music from iPad & Phones	Chennai	4	Eliminated
Sujata & Umakant Sahu (Guna)	27 & 28	Acrobatics	Mallakhamb Duo	Rishikesh	3	Eliminated
Dark Criminals Crew	16-22	Dance	Swag Dancing Group	Ahmedabad	3	Eliminated
DSR Crew	16-25	Dance	Dance Crew	Jamshedpur	3	Eliminated
Swagistan	26-43	Singing	Fusion Band	Jaipur	3	Eliminated
Komal Gandhar	18-24	Dance	Transgender Dance Group	Kolkata	1	Pre-finalist
Proneita Swargari	25	Dance	Twerk Dance Style	Assam	3	Eliminated
Gurugram Warriors	11-25	Acrobatics	Acrobatic Group with Risky Props	Gurugram	3	Eliminated
Show Stoppers Crew	16-19	Dance	Contemporary Act	Indore	4	Pre-finalist
Pallu Girls	13-22	Dance	Dance Act	Uttar Pradesh	2	Eliminated
Ismail Langa Group	11-47	Singing	Folk Singing Group	Jodhpur	2	Eliminated
Om Dance Academy	14-26	Dance	Bharatanatyam Fusion Dance	Pune	2	Eliminated
Crazy Hoppers	10-27	Dance	Acrobatics Dance Group	Agra	4	Grand-finalist
Afsana Khan & Razia Sultan	23 & 30	Singing	Sisters Singing Duo	Bathinda	2	Eliminated
Sarvam Patel	28	Variety	Sand Art	Mumbai	2	Eliminated
Royal Boys Crew	14-19	Dance	Freestyle Dance Crew	Chandigarh	2	Eliminated
S. S. T. Warning Crew	8-11	Dance	School Dance Group	Ahmedabad	2	Eliminated
Swaranjali Music Academy	45-60	Singing	House-wife Singing Group	Vadodara, Gujarat	1	Eliminated
Brothers Bond Crew	18-22	Dance	Dance Group	Allahabad	1	Eliminated
J. D. Carbon Crew	8-24	Dance	Dance Crew	Rohtak	1	Eliminated
Sagar Ovhalkar	20	Acrobatics	Mallakhamb Act	Chembur	1	Eliminated
B. S. Reddy	37	Magic	Illusionist	Visakhapatnam	1	Eliminated
Skeleton Crew	20-35	Dance	Light-Up Dance Group	New Delhi	1	Eliminated
Dream Track Band	20-29	Instrumental	Instrumental Band	Thrissur, Kerala	1	Eliminated

=== Semi Finals Summary ===
Buzzed out |
Won the Judges' Choice |
Won the Public's Vote |
Eliminated

==== Semi-final 1 (9 December) ====
- Special Guests: Riteish Deshmukh & Saiyami Kher

Semi-Finalist	Order	Buzzes			Result
Semi-Finalist	Order	Kirron	Karan	Malaika	Result
Sagar Ovhalkar	1				Eliminated
Brothers Bond Crew	2				Eliminated
B. S. Reddy	3				Eliminated
Komal Gandhar	4				Advanced (Won Public Vote)
Swaranjali Music Academy	5				Eliminated
Skeleton Crew	6				Eliminated
Sufi Nizami Brothers	7				Advanced (Won Judges' Choice)
J. D. Carbon Crew	8				Eliminated
Dream Track Band	9				Eliminated

==== Semi-final 2 (15 December) ====
- Special Guests: Katrina Kaif & Anushka Sharma

Semi-Finalist	Order	Buzzes			Result
Semi-Finalist	Order	Kirron	Karan	Malaika	Result
S. S. T. Warning Crew	1				Eliminated
Ismail Langa Group	2				Eliminated
Mukesh Singh & Rahul Singh	3				Advanced (Won Public Vote)
Pallu Girls	4				Eliminated
Altmas Khan	5				Advanced (Won Judges' Choice)
Sarvam Patel	6				Eliminated
Royal Boys Crew	7				Eliminated
Afsana Khan & Razia Sultan	8				Eliminated
Om Dance Academy	9				Eliminated

==== Semi-final 3 (16 December) ====
Semi-Finalist	Order	Buzzes			Result
Semi-Finalist	Order	Kirron	Karan	Malaika	Result
Gurugram Warriors	1				Eliminated
Live 100 Experience	2				Advanced (Won Judges' Choice)
Proneita Swargari	3				Eliminated
Javed Khan	4				Advanced (Won Public Vote)
Bidisha Mohanta	5				Eliminated
Sujata & Umakant Sahu (Guna)	6				Eliminated
Dark Criminals Crew	7				Eliminated
Swagistan	8				Eliminated
Om Dance AcademyDSR Crew	9				Eliminated

==== Semi-final 4 (22 December) ====
- Special Guest: Vicky Kaushal & Yami Gautam

The eight golden buzzer acts performed in this semi-final. The public voting was not opened for this semi-final, the judges chose two acts to perform in the pre-finale.

Semi-Finalist	Order	Buzzes			Result
Semi-Finalist	Order	Kirron	Karan	Malaika	Result
Bishnu Behra (Vishnu Prasad)	1				Eliminated
Crazy Hoppers	2				Advanced (Won Judges' Choice)
North Eastern Chronicles	3				Eliminated
Ramie Singh	4				Eliminated
R G Rathod	5				Eliminated
S. Angels	6				Eliminated
Show Stoppers Crew	7				Advanced (Won Judges' Choice)
Navneet Sundar & Rangapriya Sankaranarayan	8				Eliminated

=== Finals Summary ===
==== Pre Finale: India Ka Faisla (23 December) ====
Golden Buzzer Advancement |
Advanced to Top 9 Finalists |
Public Wildcard

- Special Guests: Rohit Shetty and Ranveer Singh

The public voting results of the three semi-finals were announced in the pre-finale. The eight participants, along with a public wildcard, Bidhisha Mohanta, performed to gain public votes for the finale. Additionally, a group golden buzzer was given to Crazy Hoppers to advance them directly to the Top 5.

Pre-Finalist	Order	Buzzes			Result
Pre-Finalist	Order	Kirron	Karan	Malaika	Result
Javed Khan	1				Advanced to Top 5 (Won Public Vote)
Sufi Nizami Brothers	2				Eliminated
Mukesh Singh & Rahul Singh	3				Advanced to Top 5 (Won Public Vote)
Crazy Hoppers	4				Advanced to Top 5 (Won Judges' Choice)
Live 100 Experience	5				Advanced to Top 5 (Won Public Vote)
Altmas Khan	6				Advanced to Top 5 (Won Public Vote)
Komal Gandhar	7				Eliminated
Bidisha Mohanta	8				Eliminated
Show Stoppers Crew	9				Eliminated

==== Grand Finale (29 December) ====
Winner | Runner-up

The top 5 finalists were announced from among the nine pre-finalists, and they performed for the judges' scores out of 10, which would be added to the total public votes received in the pre-finale.

Finalist	Order	Judges' Scores				Result
Finalist	Order	Kirron	Karan	Malaika	Total	Result
Javed Khan	1	8	8	9	25	1st (Note: Live 100 Experience and Javed Khan were tied in the cumulative judges' scores and public votes. Therefore, based solely on the public votes, the latter was crowned as the winner.)
Mukesh Singh and Rahul Singh	2	7	7	7	21	Grand-finalist
Crazy Hoppers	3	7	7	9	23	Grand-finalist
Altmas Khan	4	8	7	8	23	Grand-finalist
Live 100 Experience	5	10	10	10	30	2nd
