= India's Got Talent season 9 =

India's Got Talent
- Season 9
- Promotional Poster for season 9, featuring (L to R) judges Muntashir, Kher, Shetty and Badshah.
- Hosted by: Arjun Bijlani
- Judges: Manoj Muntashir; Shilpa Shetty Kundra; Badshah; Kirron Kher; Malaika Arora Khan (guest)
- Winner: Divyansh and Manuraj
- Runner-up: Ishita Vishwakarma
- No. of episodes: 28

Release
- Original network: SET India
- Original release: 15 January – 17 April 2022

Season chronology
- ← Previous; Season 8 Next → Season 10

India's Got Talent 9, is the ninth series of the Indian reality TV series India's Got Talent. It premiered from 15 January 2022 on Sony TV. Kirron Kher judging the show for the ninth time along with Manoj Muntashir, Shilpa Shetty and Badshah who were the judges of the season 9. This season was hosted by Arjun Bijlani.

Flute & beat-box duo Divyansh & Manuraj was announced as the winner on 17 April 2022.

== Season Overview ==
Unlike previous seasons, the judge cuts episode was merely reduced to 10 minutes discussion between the judges. They selected other 6 acts which would compete along with 8 golden buzzers in quarter-finals. And later in the season, six acts along with eight golden buzzer acts compete in a weekly competition with act(s) eliminating each week till the season finale.

The wildcard act chosen by the judges was dance group Euphony, after they lost judges' vote. Another wildcard act i.e. Krish and Shalini were chosen by the public using SonyLIV application on their phones.

=== Golden Buzzer Summary ===
Golden buzzer returned for its fifth series. This year the golden buzzer acts went straight to Top 14. In Finals, "Golden Buzzer" was used as an appreciation key.

Kirron Kher	Badshah	Shilpa Shetty Kundra	Manoj Muntashir
Crazy Hoppers; Acrobatic Dance Crew	Bomb Fire; Dance Crew	Demolition Crew; Acrobatic Dance Crew	Sathi Dey; Hair Aerial Dancer
Workout Warriors; Balancing Group	Divyansh & Manuraj; Beatboxer & Flautist	Nitish Bharti; Sand Animator	Ishita Vishwakarma; Singer

=== Top 14 ===
The following list includes the Top 14 quarter-finalists and their respective results in the season. Ages of the contestants were not revealed.

Winner | Runner-up | Third Place | Finalist

Quarter-finalist | Judges' Wildcard Quarter-finalist | Public Wildcard Quarter-finalist
Golden Buzzer (Auditions)

Contestant(s)	Genre	Act	From	Last Quarter-final	Result
Bad Salsa 2.0	Dance	Salsa	Kolkata, West Bengal	5	Eliminated
Bomb Fire Crew	Dance	Acro Dance	New Delhi, Delhi	8	2nd Runner-up
B.S. Reddy	Magic	Magic Act	Visakhapatnam, AP	8	Finalist
Crazy Hoppers Crew	Dance	Acrobatic Dance	Agra, Uttar Pradesh	8	Eliminated
Demolition Crew	Dance	Acro Dance	Ambarnath, Maharashtra	8	Finalist
Divyansh & Manuraj	Music	Beat Box & Flute	Rajasthan	8	Winner
Euphony	Music	Instrumental Band	Mumbai, Maharashtra	6	Eliminated
Ishita Vishwakarma	Music	Vocals	Jabalpur, Madhya Pradesh	8	1st Runner-up
Nitish Bharti	Performance Art	Sand Animation	Mumbai, Maharashtra	7	Withdrew
Rishabh Chaturvedi	Music	Vocals	Amritsar, Punjab	8	Finalist
Sathi Dey	Dance	Hair Aerial Act	Bardhaman, West Bengal	2	Eliminated
Shalini & Krish	Dance	Fire Aerial Act	Rohtak, Haryana	7	Eliminated
Sufi Nizami Brothers	Music	Qawwali	New Delhi, Delhi	2	Eliminated
Warrior Squad	Calisthenics	Calisthenics Act	Gurugram, Haryana	8	Finalist
Workout Warriors	Acrobatics	Acrobatic Balance Act	Jahangirpuri, Uttar Pradesh	3	Eliminated

=== Grand Premiere (12-13 February) ===
Buzzed | Appreciation Golden Buzzer

Top 14	Order	Buzzes			
Top 14	Order	Kirron	Badshah	Shilpa	Manoj
Euphony	1				
Bomb Fire	2				
Workout Warriors	3				
Crazy Hoppers	4				
Ishita Vishwakarma	5				
B.S. Reddy	6				
Bad Salsa 2.0	7				
Sathi Dey	8				
Demolition Crew	9				
Divyansh & Manuraj	10				
Warrior Squad	11				
Rishabh Chaturvedi	12				
Nitish Bharti	13				
Sufi Nizami Brothers	14				

=== Quarter-finals Summary ===
Buzzed | Appreciation Golden Buzzer
Advanced to next quarter-final
Won Judges' Choice
Lost Judges' Choice
Eliminated after performing

==== Quarter-final 1 (12-13 February) ====
Special Guest: Dharmendra

Quarter-finalist	Order	Buzzes					Results (20 February)
Quarter-finalist	Order	Kirron	Dharmendra	Badshah	Shilpa	Manoj	Results (20 February)
Bad Salsa 2.0	1						Advanced
Demolition Crew	2						Advanced
Nitish Bharti	3						Advanced
Workout Warriors	4						Advanced
Ishita Vishwakarma	5						Advanced
Euphony	6						Won Judges' Choice
Sufi Nizami	7						Lost Judges' Choice
Sathi Dey	8						Lost Judges' Choice
Warrior Squad	9						Advanced
Rishabh Chaturvedi	10						Advanced
Bomb Fire	11						Advanced
B.S. Reddy	12						Advanced
Divyansh and Manuraj	13						Advanced
Crazy Hopper	14						Advanced

==== Quarter-final 2 (19-20 February) ====
Special Guest: Jackie Shroff

Quarter-finalist	Order	Buzzes					Results (27 February)
Quarter-finalist	Order	Kirron	Badshah	Jackie	Shilpa	Manoj	Results (27 February)
Bad Salsa 2.0	1						Won Judges' Choice
Euphony	2						Lost Judges' Choice
Bomb Fire	3						Advanced
Workout Warriors	4						Lost Judges' Choice
Ishita Vishwakarma	5						Advanced
Nitish Bharti	6						Advanced
B.S. Reddy	7						Advanced
Crazy Hoppers	8						Advanced
Rishabh Chaturvedi	9						Advanced
Demolition Crew	10						Advanced
Divyansh and Manuraj	11						Advanced
Warrior Squad	12						Advanced
Sufi Nizami	13						Eliminated
Sathi Dey	14	Did not perform due to health issues					Eliminated

==== Quarter-final 3 (26-27 February) ====
Special Guests: Rohit Shetty & The Fame Game cast

Quarter-finalist	Order	Buzzes					Results (6 March)
Quarter-finalist	Order	Kirron	Badshah	Madhuri	Shilpa	Manoj	Results (6 March)
Crazy Hoppers	1						Advanced
Rishabh Chaturvedi	2						Advanced
Warrior Squad	3						Advanced
Divyansh and Manuraj	4						Advanced
Bomb Fire	5						Advanced
Nitish Bharti	6						Advanced
Krish & Shalini	7						Advanced
Workout Warriors	8						Eliminated
Euphony	9						Eliminated
Demolition Crew	10						Advanced
Ishita Vishwakarma	11						Advanced
B.S. Reddy	12						Advanced
Bad Salsa 2.0	13						Advanced

==== Quarter-final 4 (Ep. 17 & 18) ====
Special Guests: Govinda, Karishma Kapoor & Devi Sri Prasad

Quarter-finalist	Order	Buzzes						Results
Quarter-finalist	Order	Kirron	Badshah	Karishma	Govinda	Shilpa	Manoj	Results
Bad Salsa 2.0	1							Lost Judges' Choice
Demolition Crew	2							Won Judges' Choice
Ishita Vishwakarma	3							Advanced
Crazy Hoppers	4							Advanced
Krish & Shalini	5							Advanced
B.S. Reddy	6							Advanced
Bomb Fire	7							Advanced
Rishabh Chaturvedi	8							Advanced
Warrior Squad	9							Advanced
Divyansh and Manuraj	10							Advanced
Nitish Bharti	11							Advanced

==== Quarter-final 5 (Ep. 19) ====
Guest Judge: Malaika Arora Khan in absence of Shilpa
Special Guests: Tamannaah Bhatia & Bappi Lahiri's Family

Quarter-finalist	Order	Buzzes				Results
Quarter-finalist	Order	Kirron	Badshah	Malaika	Manoj	Results
Euphony	1					Lost Judges' Choice
Crazy Hoppers	2					Advanced
Ishita Vishwakarma	3					Advanced
Demolition Crew	5					Advanced
Krish & Shalini	4					Advanced
Nitish Bharti	6					Won Judges' Choice
Bad Salsa 2.0	7					Eliminated
Rishabh Chaturvedi	8					Advanced
Bomb Fire	9					Advanced
Warrior Squad	10					Advanced
Divyansh and Manuraj	11					Advanced
B.S. Reddy	12					Advanced

==== Quarter-final 6 (26 March) ====
Special Guests: John Abraham, Jacqueline Fernandez, Rakul Preet Singh, Terence Lewis & Miss Universe 2021 Harnaaz Sandhu

Quarter-finalist	Order	Buzzes				Results
Quarter-finalist	Order	Kirron	Badshah	Shilpa	Manoj	Results
Krish & Shalini	1					Lost Judges' Vote
Rishabh Chaturvedi	2					Advanced
Warrior Squad	3					Advanced
Crazy Hoppers	5					Advanced
B.S. Reddy	4					Won Judges' Vote
Euphony	6					Eliminated
Ishita Vishwakarma	7					Advanced
Bomb Fire	8					Advanced
Divyansh and Manuraj	9					Advanced
Demolition Crew	10					Advanced
Nitish Bharti	11					Advanced

==== Quarter-final 7 (2 April) ====
Guests: Dasvi Cast (Abhishek Bachchan, Nimrat Kaur and Yami Gautam) and Jersey Cast (Shahid Kapoor & Mrunal Thakur)

Quarter-finalist	Order	Buzzes				Results
Quarter-finalist	Order	Kirron	Badshah	Shilpa	Manoj	Results
Crazy Hoppers	1					(No Judge Vote)- Lost Public's Vote
Divyansh and Manuraj	2					Advanced
Warrior Squad	3					Advanced
Ishita Vishwakarma	5					Advanced
Demolition Crew	4					(No Judge Vote)- Won Public's Vote
Rishabh Chaturvedi	6					Advanced
Bomb Fire	7					(No Judge Vote)- Won Public's Vote
B.S. Reddy	8					Advanced
Krish & Shalini	9					Eliminated
Nitish Bharti	10	Didn't perform due to health issues				Withdrew

==== Quarter-final 8 (9 April) ====
Quarter-finalist	Order	Buzzes				Results for Top 7
Quarter-finalist	Order	Kirron	Badshah	Shilpa	Manoj	Results for Top 7
Crazy Hoppers	1					Eliminated
Demolition Crew	2					Advanced
Divyansh and Manuraj	3					Advanced
Warrior Squad	4					Advanced
Bomb Fire	5					Advanced
Ishita Vishwakarma	6					Advanced
Rishabh Chaturvedi	7					Advanced
B.S. Reddy	8					Advanced

=== Semi-final (10 April) ===
Appreciation Golden Buzzer

Guest performer: Jubin Nautiyal

Semi-finalist	Order	Buzzes			
Semi-finalist	Order	Kirron	Badshah	Shilpa	Manoj
Rishabh Chtaurvedi	1				
Divyansh & Manuraj	2				
Bomb Fire	3				
Warrior Squad	4				
Ishita Vishwakarma	5				
B.S. Reddy	6				
Demolition Crew	7				

=== Grand Finale ===
Winner | 1st Runner-up | 2nd Runner-up

Guests: Heropanti 2 Cast, Superstar Singer 2 Cast and Sugandha Mishra.

Finalist	Result
Rishabh Chaturvedi	Finalist
Demolition Crew	Finalist
Bomb Fire	3rd
Ishita Vishwakarma	2nd
Warrior Squad	Finalist
Divyansh & Manuraj	1st
B.S. Reddy	Finalist

== Ratings ==
These ratings are sourced from BARC and are limited to television only, OTT platforms views or ratings are not counted.

Episodes	Air dates	TRP	SET Weekly rank
Episode 1 & 2	15 & 16 January	2.3	1
Episode 3 & 4	22 & 23 January	2.2	1
Episode 5 & 6	29 & 30 January	1.9	1
Episode 7 & 8	5 & 6 February	1.8	1
Episode 9 & 10	12 & 13 February	1.8	1
Episode 11 & 12	19 & 20 February	1.8	1
Episode 13 & 14	26 & 27 February	1.6	1
Episode 15 & 16	5 & 6 March	1.6	1
Episode 17 & 18	12 & 13 March	1.6	1
Episode 19 & 20	19 & 20 March	1.3	1
Episode 21 & 22	26 & 27 March	1.3	1
Episode 23 & 24	2 & 3 April	1.1	1
Episode 25 & 26	9 & 10 April	1.1	1
Episode 27 & 28 (final)	16 & 17 April	1.3	1
