= Rithvik Dhanjani =

Indian actor (born 1988)

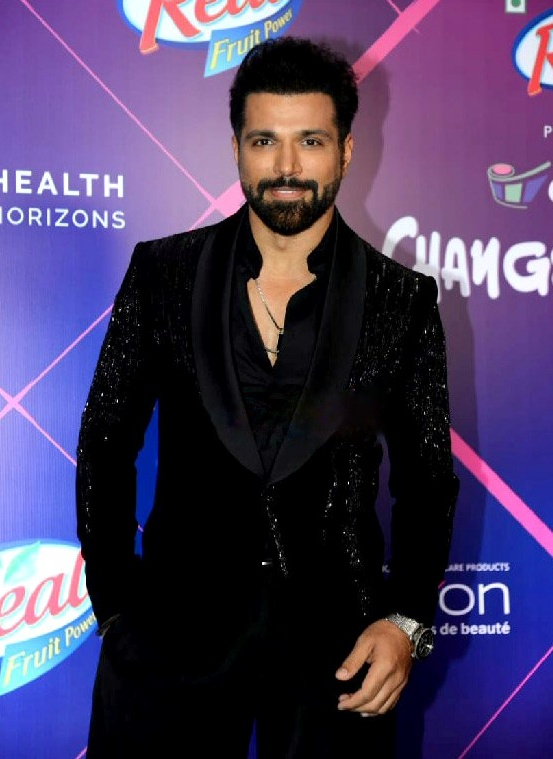
- Dhanjani in 2023
- Born: 5 November 1988 (age 37); Mandsaur, Madhya Pradesh, India
- Education: City of London College, London
- Occupations: Actor; television host; dancer
- Years active: 2009-present
- Known for: Pyaar Kii Ye Ek Kahaani; Pavitra Rishta; Super Dancer; Cartel
- Partner: Asha Negi (2013-2020)

Rithvik Dhanjani (born 5 November 1988) is an Indian actor who primarily works in Hindi television and web shows. He made his acting debut in 2009, portraying Parth in Bandini. Dhanjani earned wider recognition with his portrayal of Arjun Digvijay Kirloskar in Pavitra Rishta. He is a recipient of one Indian Telly Award and Gold Award each, along with other nominations. He is currently a contestant on the reality show Khatron Ke Khiladi 15.

Dhanjani had his first success with Pyaar Kii Ye Ek Kahaani, where he was seen portraying Jay Khurana. His film debut Jo Hum Chahein (2011), failed to leave a mark. The year 2013, marked a turning point in his career when he turned host with Yeh Hai Aashiqui and his success there led to him hosting other shows including India's Next Superstars, Super Dancer, India's Best Dramebaaz and So You Think You Can Dance. He made his web debut with I Don't Watch TV (2016) and has been part of successful web series including XXX (2018) and Cartel (2021).

In addition to his acting career, Dhanjani has won reality shows such as Nach Baliye 6, with his then partner Asha Negi and I Can Do That.

== Early life ==
Dhanjani was born on 5 November 1988 in Mandsaur, Madhya Pradesh. His family, who's Sindhi, moved to Dubai soon after he was born. He has a younger sister named Heena Dhanjani. He did his schooling in Dubai and complete his graduation from City of London College, London. In his college days, he was into acting, modeling and hosting shows.

Later, Dhanjani got involved in theater for as long as two and a half years. After doing theatre and events in Dubai, he decided to shift to Mumbai to become an actor. He then did an acting course from the Kishore Namit Kapoor Institute before entering the television industry.

== Career ==
=== Debut and early roles (2009–2012) ===
Dhanjani began his acting career with a cameo in Bandini in 2009, where he played Parth, a negative character. He then portrayed supporting parts of Prithvi Pundir in Bairi Piya from 2009 to 2010 and Partho Rawal in Tere Liye in 2010.

He had his big break with Pyaar Kii Ye Ek Kahaani where he played the antagonist, Jay Khurana from 2010 to 2011, who was a werewolf and in love with Sukirti Kandpal's character. In 2011, he made his film debut with Jo Hum Chahein, portraying Akash. The film received mixed to negative reviews and was a box-office failure. He also worked in the short film, Aftermath portraying Ali.

In June 2012 Rithvik entered Jhalak Dikhhla Jaa 5 as wild card entry and became the second runner up.

=== Establishment as an actor and presenter (2013-2019) ===
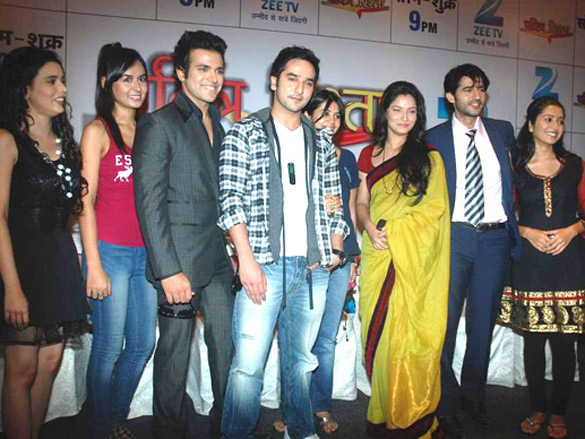
Dhanjani with Pavitra Rishta's team

Dhanjani's portrayal of Arjun Digvijay Kirloskar opposite Asha Negi in Balaji Telefilms's Pavitra Rishta proved as a major turning point in his career. He portrayed the character from 2011 to 2014. Dhanjani got several nominations for his portrayal and won the Indian Telly Award for Best Actor in a Supporting Role.

In 2013, he hosted India's Best Dramebaaz with Ragini Khanna. From 2013 to 2015, he hosted two seasons of Yeh Hai Aashiqui, which gained him further praises. In 2013, he also portrayed Kabir, opposite Mihika Verma in an episode of Yeh hai Aashiqui. In 2015, he and Negi recreated their love story in the final episode of Season 1.

The same year, he participated in Nach Baliye 6 with his then partner Asha Negi and they emerged as the winners. In 2014, he portrayed Vidhyut in MTV Fanaah. In the same year, he participated in the dance reality show Dare 2 Dance and hosted the finale episode of India's Raw Star. He hosted a variety of shows such as V Distraction and Nach Baliye 7 with Karan Patel.

Dhanjani emerged as the winner of the stunt based reality show I Can Do That. He has also hosted India's Best Dramebaaz (Season 2) the same year. Dhanjani hosted four shows in 2016 including Pyaar Ki Yeh Kahani Suno, So You Think You Can Dance, Man Vs. Job and Super Dancer (Chapter 1). Dhanjani nade his web debut with I Don't Watch TV in 2016.

In 2017, he first hosted Aye Zindagi and then participated in Fear Factor: Khatron Ke Khiladi 8 and ended at 7th place. He also participated in Lip Sing Battle. From 2017 to 2018, he hosted Super Dancer (Chapter 2), for which he won Gold Award for Best Anchor, and Rasoi Ki Jung Mummyon Ke Sung. He hosted, India's Next Superstars and India's Got Talent 8 in 2018.

Dhanjani portrayed Shivam Chaturvedi, opposite Anita Hassanandani in Galti Se Mis-Tech. It received positive reviews. He portrayed Mayank in XXX, both in 2018. He hosted Super Dancer Chapter 3 from 2018 to 2019.

=== Expansion and career progression (2020-present) ===
Dhanjani participated in Fear Factor: Khatron Ke Khiladi – Made in India in 2020. He stood at 7th place and quit the show midway. The same year, he appeared in Lockdown Rishtey, as a presenter. He then appeared in Ladies vs Gentlemen as panelist.

In 2021, He hosted Super Dancer 4. Dhanjani next portrayed Abhay Angre opposite Monica Dogra in 2021 series Cartel. Joginder Tuteja for ABP News noted, "Rithvik is a find. When Cartel begins, it takes time to adapt to his character and mannerisms. However as the series progresses, you get the ‘sur’ of him, something that unleashes big time towards the terrific climax."

Dhanjani in 2022, appeared in the short film, Arranged, portraying Tarun opposite Tridha Choudhury. Praising his performance, Archika Khurana wrote, "Both, Tridha’s Richa and Rithvik’s Tarun are the most appealing and well-written characters of the film. Onscreen, they get along well, and their genuine and sincere performances contribute to the story's relatability." The same year, he hosted Global Excellence Awards and Indian Film Festival of Melbourne.

In 2023, Dhanjani appeared in an interactive film Lost and Found in Singapore opposite Apoorva Arora. It was released on MX Player. That year, he also appeared in an episode of the mini series Butterflies.

Dhanjani began 2024 with the reality show Aapka Apna Zakir, where he appeared as a panel member. Following this, he played Ved in the second season of Half Love Half Arranged opposite Maanvi Gagroo. Bhawna Arya stated, "Rithvik's Ved has our heart, the innocence in his character is clearly intriguing and he plays his part flawlessly."

== Personal life ==
Dhanjani met actress Asha Negi on the set of Pavitra Rishta in 2011 and later they began dating. Dhanjani and Negi parted ways in May 2020, after 7 years of relationship.

== Other work and public image ==
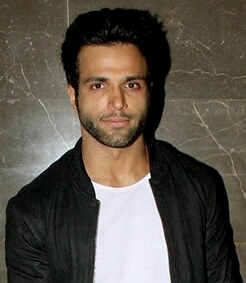
Dhanjani in 2015

Dhanjani along with his Cartel team, joined a project named, "JO FO MO" with a NGO to help the charity organizations raise funds for the migrant workers, during the COVID-19 pandemic. He has ramp walked in the ITA Creators Walk in 2017 and has been the cover model for several magazines such as Zing Magazine and Gr8 Magazine, where he featured with Asha Negi.

Dhanjani ranked 15th in 2013 in Eastern Eye's 50 Sexiest Asian Men list. In the same list, he ranked 21st in 2014 and 20th in 2015. In Times of India's Most Desirable Men on TV list, he was placed 13th in 2017. Apart from acting, Dhanjani is a celebrity endorser for several brands and products, including Vivo. He also featured in Amazon Audible's ad film with Nakuul Mehta. In 2024, Dhanjani started his own clothing line, named RDX.

== Filmography ==
Key
†	Denotes films that have not yet been released

=== Films ===
Year	Title	Role	Notes	Ref.
2011	Jo Hum Chahein	Aakash		
2011	Aftermath	Ali	Short film	
2022	Arranged	Tarun	Short film	
2023	Lost and Found in Singapore	Dhruv		

=== Television ===
Year	Title	Role	Notes	Ref.
2010–2011	Bandini	Parth Shashank Mehta		
2009–2010	Bairi Piya	Prithvi Pundir		
2010	Tere Liye	Partho Rawal		
2010–2011	Pyaar Kii Ye Ek Kahaani	Jeh Khurana		
2011–2014	Pavitra Rishta	Arjun Digvijay Kirloskar		
2012	Jhalak Dikhhla Jaa 5	Contestant	2nd runner-up	
2013	India's Best Dramebaaz	Host		
2013	Yeh Hai Aashiqui	Kabir	Episode: "Lights, Camera, Heartbreak"	
2013–2015	Yeh Hai Aashiqui	Host	Episodes 14-94	
2013–2014	Nach Baliye 6	Contestant	Winner	
2014	MTV Fanaah	Vidhyut		
2014	India's Raw Star	Host	Finale episode	
2014	Dare 2 Dance	Contestant		
2014–2015	Box Cricket League 1	Contestant		
2015	Yeh Hai Aashiqui	Himself	Episode: "Onscreen Offscreen"	
2015	India Poochega Sabse Shaana Kaun?	Contestant	Episode 4	
2015	V Distraction	Host		
2015	Nach Baliye 7	Host		
2015	Yeh Hai Aashiqui Siyappa Ishq Ka	Host		
2015	I Can Do That	Contestant	Winner	
2015–2016	India's Best Dramebaaz	Host		
2016	Box Cricket League 2	Contestant		
2016	Pyaar Ki Yeh Kahani Suno	Host		
2016	So You Think You Can Dance	Host		
2016	Man Vs. Job	Host		
2016	Super Dancer Chapter 1	Host		
2017	Aye Zindagi	Host		
2017	Fear Factor: Khatron Ke Khiladi 8	Contestant	7th place	
2017	Lip Sing Battle	Contestant		
2017–2018	Super Dancer Chapter 2	Host		
2017–2018	Rasoi Ki Jung Mummyon Ke Sung	Host		
2018	India's Next Superstars	Host		
2018	India's Got Talent 8	Host		
2018–2019	Super Dancer Chapter 3	Host		
2020	Fear Factor: Khatron Ke Khiladi – Made in India	Contestant	9th place	
2021	Super Dancer Chapter 4	Host		
2023–2024	Jhalak Dikhhla Jaa 11	Host		
2024	Aapka Apna Zakir	Rithvik		
2026	Khatron Ke Khiladi 15	Contestant	1st runner-up	

==== Guest appearances ====
Year	Title	Role	Ref.
2013	Sapne Suhane Ladakpan Ke	Himself	
2014	MTV Webbed 2	Himself	
2014	India's Best Cinestars Ki Khoj	Himself	
2014	Hum Hain Na	Himself	
2014	Jhalak Dikhhla Jaa 6	Himself	
2015	Fear Factor: Khatron Ke Khiladi 6	Himself	
2015	Kumkum Bhagya	Arjun Kirloskar	
2015	Jamai Raja	Himself	
2017	Bigg Boss 11	Himself	
2018	Kaleerein	Himself	
2020	Fear Factor: Khatron Ke Khiladi 10	Himself	
2021	Meet: Badlegi Duniya Ki Reet	Himself	

=== Web series ===
Year	Title	Role	Notes	Ref.
2016	I Don't Watch TV	Himself		
2016	Arre: Ho Ja Re-Gender	Guest	Special appearance	
2018	Galti Se Mis-Tech	Shivam Chaturvedi		
2018	XXX	Mayank	Episode: "The Climax"	
2020	Lockdown Rishtey	Rithvik		
2020	Ladies vs Gentlemen	Himself	Panelist	
2021	Cartel	Abhay Angre		
2022	Datebaazi	Host		
2023	Butterflies 4	Gaurav	Episode: "Kebab Mein Haddi"	
2024	Half Love Half Arranged	Ved	Season 2	

== Accolades ==
Year	Award	Category	Work	Result	Ref.
2012	Gold Awards	Debut in a Lead Role - Male	Pavitra Rishta	Nominated	
2013	Indian Telly Awards	Best Actor in a Supporting Role	Pavitra Rishta	Won	
2013	Indian Telly Awards	Best Onscreen Couple (with Asha Negi)	Pavitra Rishta	Nominated	
2013	Indian Television Academy Awards	Gr8 Face of the Year	Pavitra Rishta	Nominated	
2013	Gold Awards	Best Actor in a Supporting Role	Pavitra Rishta	Nominated	
2013	Gold Awards	Gold Best Onscreen Jodi (with Asha Negi)	Pavitra Rishta	Nominated	
2017	Gold Awards	Best Anchor (Note: Shared with Paritosh Tripathi)	Super Dancer 2	Won	
2022	Pinkvilla Style Icons Awards	Super Stylish Host	—N/a	Nominated	
2022	Indian Television Academy Awards	Popular Actor - Host	Super Dancer 4	Nominated	

== See also ==
- List of Indian television actors
