= India's Raw Star =

Indian singing competition series

- Genre: Reality television
- Based on: Music
- Directed by: Gajendra Singh
- Presented by: Gauahar Khan
- Judges: Yo Yo Honey Singh; Himesh Reshammiya
- Theme music composer: Darshan Raval; Mohit Gaur
- Opening theme: Meri Pehli Mohabbat; Cupcake
- Country of origin: India
- Original language: Hindi
- No. of seasons: 1
- No. of episodes: 15

Production
- Producer: Saaibaba Telefilms
- Production location: Mumbai

Original release
- Network: Star Plus
- Release: 28 August – 30 November 2014

India's Raw Star is an Indian singing competition series created by Gajendra Singh of Saibaba Telefilms which began airing on Star Plus from 24 August 2014. It was hosted by model-actress and Bigg Boss 7 winner Gauahar Khan and mentored by singer-rapper Yo Yo Honey Singh. Rituraj Mohanty won the first season on 30 November 2014 with Darshan Raval and Mohit Gaur finishing second and third respectively. The other contestants were Sagar Bhatia, Akasa Singh, pardeep singh sran etc. Mohan Rathore, winner of a Bhojpuri singing competition 'Sur Sangram' was also one of the contestants. Arjun Kapoor and Deepika Padukone made guest appearances in the show. India's Raw Star witnessed singers like Kailash Kher, Mohit Chauhan and Shaan perform in the final episode with finalists Rituraj, Mohit and Darshan. The finalists sang the final face off song composed by Sachin and Jigar on the occasion, while Arjun Kapoor, promoted his film Tevar.

== Winner ==
Darshan Raval, Mohit Gaur and Rituraj Mohanty reached the finale of India's Raw Star. Rituraj Mohanty was announced as the winner of the show.

== Production ==
The show was filmed at sets created in the Filmcity in Goregaon at Mumbai.

== Reception ==
Vinod Talreja of Bollywoodlife.com rated the series 3.5/5 and wrote "The first episode of India's Raw Star definitely impressed us. All the music lovers who are looking for something different will surely love it. We hope it doesn't lose the plot and keeps going like this in coming episodes."

Prathamesh Jadhav from India.com said "The show is a fresh concept indeed, but it ultimately resorts to the gimmicky efforts ( for instance, back story for every contender) that stretches the duration unnecessarily."
