= Ishvinder Maddh =

- Born: 7 July 1978 (age 47); Vienna, Austria
- Other names: Baba
- Occupation: Managing Director of Robinville Intech Pvt Ltd
- Website: robinville.in

Ishvinder ‘Baba’ Maddh is an Austro-Indian entrepreneur. Since 2009, he has been representing Central and Eastern European countries in India, and his focus is to increase outbound tourism from India into these countries. He has led Indian film and television production houses for production in Austria. His notable work includes Service Production of Indian Films like Saaho, Tiger Zinda Hai, Ae Dil Hai Mushkil, and TV show Pardes Mein Hai Mera Dil in Austria.

== Early life and career ==
Ishvinder was born and raised in Vienna, Austria. He began his career in the aviation industry working with Austrian Airlines and Lauda Air in Vienna gaining early exposure to international operations and cross-cultural communication. Since 2007, he has lived in New Delhi, India. In 2009, he incorporated Robinville Intech Pvt Ltd (Robinville Art) which is currently headquartered in New Delhi. Under his guidance, the firm initially ventured in promoting Austrian and Central European tourism in India before expanding to film productions and entertainment. His other ventures include an advisory firm, Georgetown Advisory Partners. Ishvinder is an early investor in Bollyshake.com and serves as a guest lecturer in MCI Management Center Innsbruck.

== Film and TV Productions ==
Ishvinder represents film commissions like Location Austria, Cine Tirol, Scandinavian Locations in India. Over the years has facilitated many Indian film & TV productions in Austria including Ae Dil Hai Mushkil, Tiger Zinda Hai, Saaho, Pardes Me Hai Mera Dil etc. for notable production houses such as Yash Raj Films, Dharma Productions, UV Creations, and Balaji Telefilms.

== Tourism and Cultural Diplomacy ==
As the representative for Location Austria (Austrian Film Commission), Cine Tirol, and Innsbruck Tourism in India (2016–2023), Maddh’s efforts led to a dramatic increase in Indian tourist arrivals to Austria, with overnight stays more than doubling between 2015 and 2019. He organized high-level business and government delegations, such as the visit of India’s Transport Minister to Nordkette Railways, further strengthening Indo-Austrian partnerships in tourism and infrastructure.

== Bollywood Meets Austria ==
In 2018, his firm Robinville Intech Pvt Ltd along with Austrian Economic Chamber organised "Bollywood Meets Austria" where six Indian producers explored Austria from 9 to 15 September 2018. A highlight of the trip was the signing of a Memorandum of Understanding between the Indian "Film & Television Producers Guild", Austrian Economic Chamber and Location Austria 10 September 2018, to intensify the existing cooperation between the federal states. This event was given the EVA-Event-Award as "Best Newcomer Event" in 2018.

== Expansion into Music and Talent Management ==
During the COVID-19 pandemic, Maddh pivoted Robinville Intech (Branded as Robinville Art) from tourism and film facilitation to music and talent management, focusing on developing South Asian artists for the global stage. He manages acts such as Talwiinder and NDS, producing live shows and tours in cities including London, Melbourne, Sydney, and Toronto, and building partnerships with global music labels, show organizers, and digital platforms. Robinville Art has executed live shows across major Indian cities and internationally, expanding opportunities for South Asian talent.

== Awards ==
In May 2019, he received the TAI - Werbe Grand Prix 2018/19 award for "Bollywood Meets Austria" Campaign and Robinville Intech Pvt Ltd's contribution for promoting Austria as a destination for Bollywood Film Production.

== Selected Filmography (As Service/Line Producer) ==
Film/ TV Show	Year	Role/Contribution
Ae Dil Hai Mushkil	2016	Service Producer (Austria)
Tiger Zinda Hai	2017	Service Producer (Austria)
Saaho	2019	Service Producer (Austria)
Tiger 3	2023	Service Producer (Austria)
Pardes Mein Hai Mera Dil	2016	TV Service Producer (Austria)
