= Jhalak Dikhhla Jaa season 6 =

Season of television series

Jhalak Dikhhla Jaa
- Season 6
- Hosted by: Manish Paul; Kapil Sharma
- Judges: Remo D'Souza; Madhuri Dixit; Karan Johar
- No. of contestants: 20
- Celebrity winner: Drashti Dhami
- Professional winner: Salman Yusuff Khan
- No. of episodes: 31

Release
- Original network: Colors TV
- Original release: 1 June – 14 September 2013

Season chronology
- ← Previous; Season 5 Next → Season 7

Jhalak Dikhhla Jaa 6 is the sixth season of the dance reality show, Jhalak Dikhhla Jaa. It premiered on 1 June 2013 on Colors. The season was hosted by Manish Paul and Kapil Sharma. Madhuri Dixit, Karan Johar and Remo D'Souza were the three judges. The finale took place on 14 September 2013 and where Drashti Dhami with Salman Yusuff Khan emerged as the winners while Lauren Gottlieb and Punit Pathak became the runner-up.

== Cast ==
Celebrity	Notability	Professional partner	Result
Eijaz Khan	Actor	Bhawna Khanduja	Withdrew on 1 June 2013
Suresh Menon	Comedian	Suchitra Sawant	Eliminated 1st on 8 June 2013
Krishnamachari Srikkanth	Cricketer	Amrita Maitra	Eliminated 2nd on 15 June 2013
Meghna Malik	Na Aana Is Des Laado actress	Savio Barnes	Eliminated 3rd on 22 June 2013
Ekta Kaul	Actress	Tushar Kalia	Eliminated 4th on 29 June 2013
Shweta Tiwari	Actress and Bigg Boss 4 winner	Sushant Pujari (later Savio Barnes)	Eliminated 5th on 7 July 2013
Rochelle Rao	Model & Presenter	Varun Thakur	Not Selected on 12 July 2013
Rohit Roy	Actor	Suchitra Sawant	Not Selected on 12 July 2013
Vatsal Sheth	Model & Bollywood actor	Alisha Singh	Not Selected on 12 July 2013
Aarti Chabria	Bollywood actress and Khatron Ke Khiladi 4 winner	Cornel Rodrigues	Eliminated 6th on 13 July 2013
Mantra Dasgupta	Actor and RJ	Ankita Maity	Eliminated 7th on 20 July 2013
Karan Patel	Actor	Sharmishtha Rao	Eliminated 9th on 3 August 2013
Karanvir Bohra	Actor	Sneha Kapoor	Eliminated 10th on 10 August 2013
Sidharth Shukla	Balika Vadhu actor and model	Sonia Jaffer (later Mohena Singh)	Eliminated 11th on 17 August 2013
Sana Saeed	Kuch Kuch Hota Hai actress	Tushar Kalia	Eliminated 12th on 24 August 2013
Mukti Mohan	Actress and dancer	Altaf Iqbal (later Shashank Dogra)	Eliminated 13th on 7 September 2013
Shaan Mukherjee	Singer	Marischa Fernandes	Fourth place on 14 September 2013
Sonali Majumdar	India's Got Talent winner	Sumanth Maroju	Third place on 14 September 2013
Lauren Gottlieb	So You Think You Can Dance star and dancer	Punit Pathak	Runners-up on 14 September 2013
Drashti Dhami	Madhubala – Ek Ishq Ek Junoon actress	Salman Yusuff Khan	Winners on 14 September 2013

== Scoring chart ==
The highest score each week is indicated in bold green with a dagger (†), while the lowest score each week is indicated in italicized red with a double-dagger (‡).

Colour key:

Winners
Runners-up
Third place
Fourth place
Excused from competition for the week
Bottom two
Eliminated

Couple	Pl.	Week																		
Couple	Pl.	1	2	3	4	5	6	7	8	9	8+9	10	11	12	13	14	13+14	15	16	15+16
Drashti & Salman	1st	24	26	28	**30**†	27	**30**†	29	**30**†	**30**†	**60**†	25	27	22+24=46‡	27+27=54	27+30=57	111	30+10+30=**70**†	**30**†	**100**† (Note: This couple finished in first place.)
Lauren & Punit	2nd	**28**†	**30**†	**30**†	**30**†	**30**†	28	27	**30**†	**30**†	**60**†	**30**†	**30**†	30+30=**60**†	30+27=**57**†	30+30=**60**†	**117**†	30+8+30=68	**30**†	98 (Note: This couple finished in second place.)
Sonali & Sumanth	3rd	26	**30**†	29	26	28	27	**30**†	29	**30**†	59	(Note: This couple was excused from competition due to illness or injury, and was granted a bye to the following week.)	**30**†	25+30=55	27+30=**57**†	30+30=**60**†	**117**†	30+6+30=66	**30**†	96 (Note: This couple finished in third place.)
Shaan & Marischa^{3}	4th	24	**30**†	28	27	27	27	25	27	24	51	23‡	24‡	24+27=51	27+24=51‡	24+27=51	102‡	30+4+29=63‡	**30**†	93‡ (Note: This couple finished in fourth place.)
Mukti & Shashank	5th						(Note: This couple was selected as wild card.)	24	**30**†	24	54 (Note: This couple was in the bottom two, but was not eliminated.)	**30**†	27	24+24=48	24+30=54	26+23=49‡	103 (Note: This couple was eliminated.)			
Sana & Tushar	6th							27	27	29	56	**30**†	26	26+30=46‡						
Sidharth & Mohena^{2}	7th	25	20‡	25	24	24	24‡	20‡	26	27	53	23‡	24‡							
Karanvir & Sneha	8th	27	25	23‡	27	26	25	24	27	27	54	27								
Karan & Sharmishtha	9th							24	23‡	21‡	44‡									
Manta & Ankita	10th							22												
Aarti & Cornel	11th	25	27	26	24	21‡	24‡													
Shweta & Savio^{1}	12th	24	23	23‡	23‡	22														
Ekta & Tushar	13th	23	25	26	26															
Meghna & Savio	14th	26	27	24																
Srikkanth & Amrita	15th		21																	
Suresh & Suchitra	16th	21‡																		
Eijaz & Bhawna	17th	(Note: This couple withdrew from the competition.)																		

Notes

^1 In Week 5, Shweta's choreographer Sushant sustained an injury during technical rehearsals and was thus unable to perform. Savio, another dancing partner who was seen with Meghna earlier this season, replaced Sushant as Shweta's new choreographer.
^2 In Week 8, Sidharth's choreographer Sonia was injured during technical rehearsals and was unable to continue the show. Hence, Mohena, another dancing partner who was seen with Karan Wahi in the previous season, replaced Sonia as Sidharth's new choreographer.
^3 In Week 12, Shaan's choreographer Marischa hurt herself hence she could not perform on the stage. Therefore, Sneha, who was seen earlier this season with Karanvir Bohra performed with Shaan, which was choreographed by Marischa herself.

== Themes ==
The celebrities and professional partners danced one of these routines for each corresponding week:

- Week 1 : Introduction
- Week 2 : Jhalak On Wheels
- Week 3 : Dance Fusion
- Week 4 : Family
- Week 5 : Out Of The Box (Prop Pe Prop)
- Week 6 : Wild Card Entries & Back-up Dancers
- Week 7 : Filmi Masala
- Week 8 : Costume Drama (Nautanki)
- Week 9 : International 'Item Songs'
- Week 10 : Brahmastra & Team Challenge
- Week 11 : Phir Bhi Dil Hai Hindustani & Dance Marathon
- Week 12 : DJ Mix & Indian Cinema
- Week 13 : Teen Ka Tadka & Public's Demand
- Week 14 : Ganesh Acharya Special & International Style on Bollywood Songs
- Week 15 : Semi Finals & Dancing with the Fictitious Crew without their choreographers
- Week 16 : Super Finale

Week 4 was themed 'Family' Special, and each of the participating celebrities dedicated their performances as follow.

- Lauren & Punit- Father
- Sidharth & Sonia- Mother
- Shaan & Marisha- Kids
- Ekta & Tushar- Sisters
- Shweta & Sushant- Working/Single Mothers
- Karanvir & Sneha- Lovers
- Drashti & Salman- Brother and Sister
- Aarti & Cornel- Mother
- Sumanth & Sonali- Friendship

Week 5 was themed 'Out Of The Box (Prop Pe Prop)', and each of the participating celebrities performed with the given props.

- Sumanth & Sonali- Matka (Earthen Pot)
- Drashti & Salman- Chain
- Karanvir & Sneha- Feather
- Shweta & Savio- Skipping Rope
- Lauren & Punit- Umbrella
- Sidharth & Sonia- Scarf
- Shaan & Marisha- Pillow
- Aarti & Cornel- Suitcase

1st Episode of Week 6 themed 'Wild Card' Special selected 4 new contestant to current participating celebrities.

Couple	Dance Form	Dance Song
Sana & Tushar	Bollywood & Latin	Chikni Chameli & Kombdi Palali
Vastal & Alisha	Lyrical Hip-Hop & Freestyle	Main Kya Karoon
Karan & Sharmishtha	Freestyle	Deva Shree Ganesha
Mantra & Ankita	Freestyle	Dope Shope
Rochelle & Varun	Freestyle & Jazz	Babuji Dheere
Mukti & Altaf	Contemporary	Khuda Jaane
Rohit & Suchitra	Freestyle	Hud Hud Dabangg

Out of the 7 new Wild Card Entrance the couples which joined the current celebrities in the race of 'Jhalak' were

- Mukti & Altaf
- Sana & Tushar
- Karan & Sharmishtha
- Mantra & Ankita

Selected Dance
Rejected Dance

Week 10 themed 'Brahmastra & Team Challenge' had two performances from the participants, where one was a team performance. Team leader was selected from the previous week's highest scorers. Team participants, dancing style and songs were finalised by these leaders.

Category	Drashti's Team	Lauren's Team
Team Leader	Drashti & Salman	Lauren & Punit
Remaining Participants	Sana & Tushar, Mukti & Shashank, Sidharth & Mohena	Karanvir & Sneha, Shaan & Marisha
Dance Form	Salsa	Jive
Dance Song	Yeh Jawaani Hai Deewani Mashup	Lift Kara De, Phatela Jeb, Tai Tai Phish, I Hate You (Like I Love You)
Marks	30	30

- Initially Sonali & Sumant, Karan & Sharmishtha were both in Lauren's team, but Sonali being hospitalised, they could not take part in the team act and were not scored and Karan & Sharmishtha being eliminated in the same week, they were too not a part of the team performance.
- The marks gained by the participants were added to their individual marks and next elimination was based on the combined marks with the votes.

Green numbers indicates the highest score.

Week 13 was themed 'Teen Ka Tadka' special episode wherein every contestant will get a new celebrity contestant to dance with. Sana and Tushar who were paired with Mumaith Khan could not perform in the episode since they got eliminated in that week.

- Lauren & Punit- Rithvik Dhanjani
- Drashti & Salman- Sanaya Irani
- Sonali & Sumant- Darsheel Safary
- Shaan & Sneha- Hazel Keech
- Sana & Tushar- Mumaith Khan
- Mukti & Shashank- Ragini Khanna

== Dance chart ==
- Shweta performed with Savio in Week 5 due to an injury caused to her former choreographer Sushant.
- In Week 7, Mukti performed with Altaf, her former choreographer, but week 8 onwards, she continued the show with Shashank as her new choreographer.
- Week 8 onwards, Sidharth performed with Mohena due to an injury to his former partner Sonia.
- In week 10, as Sonali was hospitalised and had high fever with abdominal pain, Sumant performed a solo act which wasn't scored.
- In the first episode of week 13, Lauren-Punit performed with Rithvik, Drashti-Salman with Sanaya, Sonali-Sumant with Darsheel, Shaan-Sneha with Hazel and Mukti-Shashank with Ragini.

Highest scoring dance
Lowest scoring dance
Danced, but not scored

=== Dance forms ===
Jhalak Dikhhla Jaa (season 6) - Dance chart
Couple	Weeks																			
Couple	1	2	3	4	5	6	7	8	9	10	11	12		13		14		15		16
Drashti & Salman	Waltz	Contemporary	Argentine tango & Contemporary	Acrobatics	Flamenco	Acrobacia & Contemporary	Salsa	Afro	Jive	Contemporary	Aerial & Contemporary	Freestyle	Ballroom & Contemporary	Pasodoble	Bollywood	Bollywood	Rumba	Freestyle	Hip-Hop	Freestyle
Lauren & Punit	Hip-Hop	Robotics	Semi Classical & Pasodoble	Contemporary	Contorted Contemporary	Bollywood & Broadway	Bollywood	Contemporary	Broadway Jazz	Contemporary	Lyrical Hip Hop	Garba & Robotics	Tango	Freestyle	Bharatanatyam	Bollywood	Street Jazz	Contemporary	Hip-Hop	Hip-Hop
Sonali & Sumant	Waltz	Freestyle Contemporary	Robotic & Salsa	Freestyle	Bollywood & Semi Classical	Freestyle	Disco	Freestyle, Hip-Hop, Garba	Rock & Roll	Freestyle (Note: No scores were given for this dance.)	Semi Classical	Freestyle & Hip-Hop	Kathak & Contemporary	Hip-Hop	Contemporary	Bollywood	Salsa	Freestyle	Rumba	Salsa
Shaan & Maricsha	Disco	Freestyle Contemporary & Acrobacia	Afro & Krumping	Freestyle	Modern Contemporary	Freestyle & Pasodoble	Freestyle	Freestyle & Acrobacia	Tango	Mallakhamb & Freestyle	Freestyle	Freestyle	Contemporary & Aerial Silk	Freestyle	Bollywood	Bollywood	Waltz	Freestyle	Hip-Hop	Freestyle
Mukti & Shashank						Contemporary	Lindy Hop	Tandav	Samba	Contemporary	Contemporary	Hip-Hop	Freestyle	Afro	Mujra	Bollywood	Broadway Jazz			
Sana & Tushar						Bollywood & Latin	Cabaret, Lindy Hop & Rock & Roll	Freestyle	Pasodoble & Krumping	Aerial Contemporary	Indian Folk	Hip-Hop	Acrobacia & Afro							
Sidharth & Sonia/Mohena	Freestyle	Freestyle	Rumba & Contemporary	Freestyle & Hip-Hop	Bollywood	Bollywood	Broadway Jazz	Robotics	Rumba	Pasodoble	Contemporary & Sufi									
Karanvir & Sneha	Hip-Hop	Contemporary	Kathak & Tap	Waltz	Lyrical Hip-Hop	Garba & Bharatanatyam	Freestyle	Lavani	Salsa	Freestyle										
Karan & Sharmishtha						Freestyle	Bollywood & Jive	Pasodoble	Hip-Hop											
Mantra & Ankita						Freestyle	Freestyle													
Aarti & Cornel	Bachata	Freestyle	Kalaripayattu & Tango	Contemporary	Hip-Hop	Freestyle & Waltz														
Rochelle & Varun						Freestyle & Jazz														
Rohit & Suchitra						Freestyle														
Vatsal & Alisha						Lyrical Hip-Hop & Freestyle														
Shweta & Savio/Sushant	Bollywood	Jazz	Belly & Hip Hop	Contemporary	Freestyle & Hip-Hop															
Ekta & Tushar	Contemporary & Acrobacia	Contemporary	Mayurbhanj Chhau & Odissi	Contemporary																
Meghna & Savio	Rock and Roll & Jive	Bollywood	Lavani & Cha-cha-cha																	
Srikant & Amrita		Freestyle																		
Suresh & Suchitra	Tollywood																			

=== Dance songs ===
Couple	Weeks																			
Couple	1	2	3	4	5	6	7	8	9	10	11	12		13		14		15		16
Drashti & Salman	Ishq Wala Love	Uska Hi Banana	Enna Vi Na Dope Shope	Saturday Saturday	Pyaar Ki Yeh Kahani	Aao Huzoor Tumko	Nain Lad Jai Hai	O…Saya	Tumse Mili Nazar To	Jeene Laga Hoon	Bharat Ka Rahnewala & Maa Tujhe Salaam	Second Hand Jawaani & Chadti Jawani Meri	Bahon Ke Darmiyan & Tadap Tadap	Yeh Raat	Humko Aaj Kal Hai Intezaar	Halkat Jawani	O O Jaane Jaana	Ishq Bina	Sadda Dil Vi Tu	Pretty Women
Lauren & Punit	Bezubaan	Dreamum Wakeuppam	Morni Baga Bagoliyan	Ainvayi Ainvayi	Mila Toh Marega	Ooh La La	Jaane Do Na	Pehli Baar Mohabbat	Antakshri	Ali Maula	Bande Mein Tha Dum	Jalwa	Mangta Hai Kya	Maar Dala, Badtameez Dil Char Baj Gaye	I Hate Luv Storys	Aisa Jadoo	Mere Dholna Sun	Khoon Chala	Main Heroine Hoon	Behti Hawa Sa Tha Woh
Sonali & Sumant	Aashiyan	Aashayen	Mere Mehboob Mere Sanam	Jaane Kyun	Radha	Oye Lucky! & One Two Three Four	I Am a Disco Dancer	Brown Rang	Apdi Pode	Khabar Nahin (Note: No scores were given for this dance.)	Man Mohini	Chura Ke Dil Mera & Chinta Ta Ta & Aila Re Aila	Azeem-O-Shaan Shahenshah	Chil Chil Chillla Ke	Tera Naina	Husn Hai Suhana	Jhanjariya	Mere Watan	Dhoom Again	Maahi Ve
Shaan & Maricsha	Dekho Nashe & Where's The Party	Dil Kyun Yeh Mera	Kun Faya Kun	Aal Izz Well	Te Amo	Amitabh Saliloqi	Dil Mein Baji Guitar	Roshani Se	Neeyat Kharab	Dil Haara	Zinda, Lakshya & Kandhon Se Milte	Yamma Yamma	Mere Haath Main	Mashallah	Aati Kya Khandala	Main Laila	Woh Ladki Jo	Suno Na	Blue Theme	Aa Dekhen Zara
Mukti & Shashank						Khuda Jaane	Na Jaane Kahan Se Aayi Hai	Rhythmic Beat	Aa Re Pritam Pyaare	Lag Jaa Gale Se	Ghanan Ghanan	Koi Yaha Nache & Yaar Bina Chain Kahan	Yeh Kahan Aa Gaye Hum & Yeh Haseen Waadiyaan	Satrangi Re	Inhi Logon Ne	Chamma Chamma	Kabhi Tu Chhalia Lagta Hai			
Sana & Tushar						Chikni Chameli & Kombdi Palali	O Haseena Zulfonwali, Aaj Ki Raat & Parda	Ek Haseena Thi	Mast	Nahin Samne	Rang De Basanti	Pyaar Mein Dil Pein Maar De	Awara Man Mein Hai							
Sidharth & Sonia/Mohena	Raftaarein	Tip Tip Barsa Pani	Tere Bin	Rab Ka Shukraana	Dhadang Dhang & Character Dheela	Baadshah, Tumhi Dekho Naa & Dard-e-Disco	Inteha Ho Gayi Intezaar Ki	Dum	Honton Pe Bas	Khalbali & Sadda Haq	Yun Shabnami & Khwaja Mere Khwaja									
Karanvir & Sneha	Allah Duhai Hai	Anjaana Anjaani	Taal Se Taal	Ek Ladki Ko Dekha To	Mera Mann Kehne Lag	Radha Kaise, Hum Hain Is Pal & Jashn-E-Bahaara	Bachna Ae Haseeno	Panga	Jumma Chumma De De	Roundhe										
Karan & Sharmishtha						Deva Shree Ganesha	Ruk Ja O Dil Deewane	Kar Ja Re Ya Mar Ja Re	Zara Dil Ko Thaam Lo & Main Hoon Don											
Mantra & Ankita						Gabru	Hum The Woh Thi & Nakhrewali													
Aarti & Cornel	Lat Lag Gayee	Suraj Hua Maddham	Hai Rama	Tujh Mein Rab Dikhta Hai	Dhan Te Nan	Aao Na														
Rochelle & Varun						Babuji Dheere Chalna														
Rohit & Suchitra						Hud Hud Dabangg														
Vatsal & Alisha						Main Kya Karoon														
Shweta & Savio/Sushant	Fevicol Se	Muskaanein Jhooti Hai	Zara Zara Touch Me	Khwahishein	Crazy Kiya Re															
Ekta & Tushar	Meri Aashiqui	Jiyein Kyun	Rhythmic Beat	Kitni Baatein																
Meghna & Savio	Aunty Ji	Aa Ante Amalapuram	Munni Badnaam Hui																	
Srikant & Amrita		Chammak Challo																		
Suresh & Suchitra	Go Go Govinda																			

== Guest appearances ==
Week(s)	Episode(s)	Guest(s)	Note(s)
1	Ep01	Sushant Singh Rajput	Introduced female contestants in the Grand Premiere episode
1	Ep01	Jacqueline Fernandez	Introduced male contestants in the Grand Premiere episode
1	Ep01	Ranbir Kapoor	To promote Yeh Jawani Hai Deewani
1	Ep02	Dharmendra, Sunny Deol & Bobby Deol	To promote Yamla Pagla Deewana 2
2	Ep03	Sunny Leone	To announce First Elimination Result
3	Ep06	Ranveer Singh	To promote Lootera
4	Ep07	Sonam Kapoor & Dhanush	To promote Raanjhanaa
4	Ep08	Vidya Balan	To promote Ghanchakkar
6	Ep11	Farhan Akhtar	To promote Bhaag Milkha Bhaag
6	Ep12	Shahrukh Khan & Rohit Shetty	To promote Chennai Express
7	Ep13	Prabhu Deva & Girish Kumar	To promote Ramaiya Vastavaiya
7	Ep14	Vivian Dsena	To support Drashti Dhami
8	Ep16	Mika Singh	To support Shaan
8	Ep16	Rishi Kapoor & Arjun Rampal	To promote D-Day
8	Ep17	Shakti Mohan & Neeti Mohan	To support Mukti Mohan
9	Ep18	Sanaya Irani	To support Drashti Dhami
9	Ep19	John Abraham	To promote Madras Cafe
10	Ep21	Riteish Deshmukh	To promote Grand Masti
12	Ep25	Bharti Singh	In Teen ka tadka episode
12	Ep25	Ram Charan & Priyanka Chopra	To promote Zanjeer
12	Ep26	Sushant Singh Rajput & Parineeti Chopra	To promote Shuddh Desi Romance
13	Ep27	Shahid Kapoor & Ileana D'Cruz	To promote Phata Poster Nikhla Hero
13	Ep28	Salman Khan	To promote Bigg Boss
14	Ep29	Anil Kapoor	To promote 24
14	Ep29	Irrfan Khan	To promote The Lunchbox
14	Ep30	Ranbir Kapoor, Rishi Kapoor & Neetu Singh	To promote Besharam
14	Ep30	Karan Singh Grover	To support Drashti Dhami
15	Ep31	Hrithik Roshan & Priyanka Chopra	To promote Krrish 3
15	Ep31	Gurmeet Choudhary, Karan Wahi & Rashami Desai	Special appearances
15	Ep31	Anirudh Ravichander & Yo Yo Honey Singh	Special appearances
