= Pyaar Kii Ye Ek Kahaani =

Indian television series

- Genre: Teen drama Romantic thriller Supernatural
- Created by: Ekta Kapoor
- Written by: Ritu Bhatia (dialogues)
- Screenplay by: Athlea Kaushal
- Story by: Sonali Jaffar
- Directed by: Partho Mitra, Raminder Singh Suri, Ashish Shrivatav and Nitesh Singh
- Creative directors: Prashant Bhatt; Chloe Ferns; Meet Kohli
- Starring: Vivian Dsena; Sukirti Kandpal
- Country of origin: India
- Original language: Hindi
- No. of seasons: 1
- No. of episodes: 331

Production
- Producers: Ekta Kapoor; Shobha Kapoor
- Production location: Mumbai, Maharashtra
- Cinematography: Mahesh Talkad
- Editors: Vikas Sharma; Vishal Sharma; Sandeep Bhatt; Rajiv Yadav
- Camera setup: Multi-camera
- Running time: 24 minutes
- Production company: Balaji Telefilms

Original release
- Network: STAR One
- Release: 18 October 2010 – 15 December 2011

Pyaar Kii Ye Ek Kahaani (translation: This Is a Story of Love) is an Indian supernatural television series produced by Ekta Kapoor that aired on STAR One from 18 October 2010 to 15 December 2011. Developed under the working title "Fanaa", it was regarded as one of the more ambitious projects by producer Ekta Kapoor. Starring Vivian Dsena and Sukirti Kandpal, the show was the first youth-centric supernatural series in India inspired by The Vampire Diaries and the Twilight Saga. Vivian Dsena's portrayal of a vampire helped establish his public notability.

== Plot ==
The story follows Abhay, a 200-year-old vampire who falls for a human Piya, who resembles his soulmate when he was human, princess Maithili.

The series begins with Piyali/Piyashree Jaiswal, a bright girl from an orphanage receiving a Harrison scholarship for a prominent college in Dehradun, the Mount College. Piya and her mother Sugandh Jaiswal were abandoned by her father, Arnab Dobriyal, when she was a child. After her mother's death due to cancer, she lived in the orphanage for ten years. When she reaches Mount College, she is befriended by Misha Dobriyal, who introduces her to Kabir Singh Rathore, and his ex-girlfriend Tanushree Ambolkar, also known as T. Kabir falls in love with Piya at first sight. The first day, as the four go mountain rappelling, Piya falls, and an unknown person saves her. Misha introduces her elder sister Panchi Dobriyal and her mother Madhu Dobriyal to Piya. At a party that night, she meets Panchi's fiancé Danish Singh Rathore who is Kabir's cousin. T insults Piya at the party and Piya leaves the venue. In the forest, she meets her unknown saviour for the second time. Piya's roommate plots against her in a case of drugs. Misha requests her father to save Piya. Piya's hostel mistress discovers the plot and takes the culprits to the police station.

When Piya sees Misha's father, she is shocked to learn that he is her father. Arnab however does not recognise Piya, having last seen her during her childhood and also believes that Sugandh and Piya died in an accident. Piya realises that Madhu is her stepmother and Panchi and Misha are her half-sisters. The next day, Misha introduces her to Ruhi Juneja or Tracker, her friend. An unknown guy she met earlier when arriving in Dehradun is revealed to be Abhay Raichand, who comes to seek admission into the college. The Raichands become a big name in the city as they arrive, buying an old empty house on the outskirts, and transact many deals with prominent businesspeople like Mr. Dobriyal. Abhay is rude and arrogant, and when the principal does not give him admission, the family has the principal replaced.

Panchi is the director of a skit in which Piya plays Juliet and Kabir, Romeo. Abhay wants the role of Romeo which leads to a contest that Abhay wins. The Raichands host a party, where Abhay excludes Piya's name as he doesn't want her in the party but Misha forgets her invitation card in her room and asks Piya to bring it over. When Abhay sees Piya in the party, he hurts and insults her. Haseena Raichand, Abhay's mother, asks him to apologize. Abhay does so in front of the guests and asks her to dance with him, which makes Kabir jealous.

The next day when Piya visits the Raichands' house to give sweets to them for her birthday, Abhay's father, Chand Raichand is shocked to see her face as she resembles Abhay's ex-girlfriend. Abhay and Piya collide several times and fight every time. Kabir writes a love letter to Piya and tells her that if she reciprocates, she should wear a yellow dress the next day. Instead of putting the letter in Piya's locker, he drops it into Misha's. Misha is shocked to read the letter and places the letter beside T's locker which makes T believe that Kabir still loves her. The letter then reaches Tracker by mistake. Misha tries the next day to hide from Kabir. Piya accidentally spills juice on her, and gives her a yellow top to wear. Misha reluctantly agrees to wear it. Kabir sees Piya wearing a yellow skirt, and assumes she likes him too, which makes Abhay jealous. When they both are rehearsing their roles, Abhay is mesmerized by Piya because her straight hair is like that of his ex-girlfriend Mathili.

A new roommate, Maya Sharma, arrives and befriends Piya but hides something from her. In Misha's birthday party Piya, Misha and Panchi learn that Maya is pregnant and being abused by her boyfriend. Due to certain misunderstandings, Piya thinks Abhay is her boyfriend, and Maya does not contradict this. Although Piya is charmed by and attracted to Abhay, his rudeness and attitude make her believe that he is the culprit. In the party, Kabir confess his love to Piya in front of everyone. Abhay asks Piya to accept Kabir's proposal and eventually she agrees. Abhay makes T stay away from Piya. One day in a club party Piya accidentally falls into Abhay's arms and Abhay remembers his past with Mathili.

Madhu learns that Piya is Arnab and Sugandh's daughter. The next day in a boxing match in college, Abhay has the better of Kabir but deliberately loses as he is smitten by Piya who worries about Kabir's injury. Madhu meets Piya and tells her she knows that Piya is Arnab's daughter and asks her to not inform Misha and Pancho. Maya has a miscarriage and Piya thinks that Abhay orchestrated it. At Danish and Panchi's engagement Maya confesses to Piya that an innocent Abhay repeatedly saved her life, Danish is the real culprit and not even Abhay knows. Piya asks Abhay why he accepted the blame and he replies that he wants everyone, including Piya, to hate him. They realize their feelings for each other. When Piya confronts Danish, he threatens her, and Abhay arrives just in time to save Piya. Abhay finds a photo of Maya with Danish but she destroys the proof. Danish goes to Piya's hostel to hurt her but she is saved by Abhay. Piya then goes to his house and finds about Abhay's ex-girlfriend. She faces immense humiliation the next day as Abhay's parents, Chand and Haseena, arrive at the college to oust the girl who spent the night at their home, but she is saved by Abhay and Arnab. Piya tries to tell the Dobriyals the truth, but Danish instead blames her, saying that she kept throwing herself at him. An angry Arnab tries to slap Piya but is saved by Abhay.

Misha becomes suspicious of Danish because of a check given by Danish to Maya around November at which time he apparently did not yet know her. She also wonders if Piya is telling the truth. Abhay predicts an earthquake before the students sense one. Piya tells Abhay that Misha might get stuck in the locker room. Abhay breaks the wall and saves Misha. Misha tries to finds out the truth with the help of Piya's phone which had the recorded confession, but it gets thrown into water. Abhay does not like Piya telling everyone that he saved Misha but soon he learns that T was taking credit for saving Misha. Piya finds Mathili's photo in Abhay's wallet and straightens her hair just like Maithili's. Misha apologizes to Piya for her actions and both seek to hide their friendship. Abhay is shocked to see Piya's new look, while Piya asks him why he keeps Maithili's photograph in his wallet. Abhay learns that Misha and Piya have become friends again and of their plan to expose Danish. Maya confesses the truth to Kabir in front of Piya and Misha. Abhay, in his anger, ends up calling Piya 'Maithili'. Piya and Maya dress up as ballet girls to dance at Danish's bachelor's party. With the help of Kabir, they reveal the truth. Danish tries to stab Piya but she is saved by Abhay. Piya follows Abhay as his hands were bleeding but is shocked to witness the blood vanishing. Abhay goes to a grave which Piya finds out is Mathili's.

Panchi apologizes to Piya for her ill-treatment. Kabir also visits the Dobriyal house to apologize to her. Piya forgives Kabir but tells him that their relationship is at an end and they will only be friends. In a college picnic, Misha learns that Angad, Kabir's best friend, loves her. Danish who gets bailed by the Raichands, tries to kidnap Piya but kidnaps Tracker mistakenly. Abhay and Piya find Tracker but are later surrounded by wolves. He scares the wolves away but Piya gets afraid and runs away too. Next day, they go to Pandher castle. Abhay is afraid of entering it and runs from there. Kabir tells Piya about the history of Pandher and asks her to accompany with him while returning to Dehradun but she refuses and instead gets stuck in the castle. Danish tries to kill Piya but Abhay realizes that Piya is in danger and saves her. In the castle, Piya sees Mathili's painting and is shocked that she was a princess of Pandher 200 years ago. Abhay tells her that he is writing a book on Pandher and that is why he keeps Mathili's picture in his wallet. Abhay brings Piya's silver chain which she lost in the castle, but when the chain falls into his hands, they bleed. Piya has seen Abhay do several things which are beyond comprehension. She questions him, but he misleads her.

Panchi gets a new job and Misha and Panchi plan to bring Abhay and Piya closer. On the other hand, Sugandh's lawyer informs Arnab that Sugandh died because of cancer and Piya is still alive; Arnab is shocked because he was told both Sugandh and Piya died in a car accident. Piya discovers that Arnab has learnt the truth, but doesn't tell him that she is his daughter. Piya finds a book in the college library which is on Pandher but is unable to read it because it is written in an old language. Piya visits the castle again and meets an old man who tells her that the book is written in Pandher's language to hide the secrets of Pandher. He narrates the story of Princess Mathili to her and tells her that the princess was in love with a pauper Abhayendra Singh. When king learnt of it, he punished his own daughter by burning her alive and Abhayendra who tries to rescue her perishes in the fire too. Piya thinks that she and Abhay are both reborn, as Abhayendra's face is similar to Abhay's. Piya gifts Abhay a book on his birthday party which contains Maithili's photo.

Piya learns that Abhay is the adopted son of Chand and Haseena. Abhay abducts Piya when she dresses up like Maithili in a party and questions his and Maithili's connection. He leaves her in a cave but retrieves after realizing his mistake. Chand and Haseena find out about Piya's quest and decide to leave the city. Piya meets with an accident and Kabir takes her to the hospital and informs Misha. Arnab donates blood to Piya and Madhu decides to disclose the truth about Piya to Arnab. Abhay realizes that Piya is in danger and visits the hospital secretly, healing her wounds with his power. Abhay visits Piya's hostel to see her. Piya realizes her love for Abhay and decides to uncover the truth of Maithili and him. She goes to an old cottage where Mathili was burnt alive but gets stuck in the cottage as it catches fire. Abhay tries to rescue her but is unable to. Having lost Maithili similarly, he decides to assume his vampire form to save Piya. Piya is shocked to witness it and contemplates running away but returns when she realises that she loves him. Abhay decides to stay away from Piya as he doesn't want her to become part of his world.

Abhay and Piya try to stay away from each other but they can't and soon Abhay discovers a CD which contains the truth about Piya's father. Piya breaks the CD. Misha wins a Mount College fashion show and holds a party to celebrate her victory. Abhay feels that Piya might be in danger so he stays near her and tells everyone that he and Piya are still in a relationship. Abhay learns that Arnab is Piya's biological father. Initially, Panchi is disgusted by her boss Siddharth's habits but soon falls for his charms as Siddharth repeatedly saves her from having to face Danish. Piya wins a scholarship from her maternal uncle Mr. Parveen Jaiswal who is a trustee of Mount College. Misha shows the scholarship certificate to Arnab who sees her full name and realizes she is his daughter. Piya refuses to stay with him as he had abandoned her, and runs away to the forest where she meets with an accident. Abhay saves Piya by healing her wounds. It is soon discovered that Siddharth is Abhay's elder brother who also loved Maithili and died in the same fire trying to save her. Chand and Haseena had saved both brothers. Abhay feels that if Siddharth learns about Piya, he will harm her. Abhay tries to keep Piya away from Siddharth, but in a party when Siddharth is in the forest with T, he senses that Piya is around and thinks of biting her. However, he is shocked to realize that Piya resembles Maithili and understands why Abhay loves Piya so much.

Misha is finally smitten by a man for the first time, the handsome Shaurya Khanna, and tries to impress him. On prom night, Misha confesses to Shaurya that she loves him but Shaurya tells her that he has already given his heart to someone else. Siddharth makes Misha and Abhay prom queen and king, so that he has an opportunity to take Piya into the forest. At one point, to save Piya from Siddharth, Abhay bites her. Although this does not turn her into a vampire, it begins the process. Only after biting her twice more on a full moon can she fully turn. Chand and Haseena ask Abhay to stay close to Piya because Siddharth might do anything to tell Piya that Abhay bit her. Later, he admits his affection for Piya. They enjoy some beautiful moments together, hidden from the entire world, in their safe little bubble. Finally, Siddharth realises that the only way to get to Piya is through Panchi and has a relationship with her. Haseena, out of her mother's love, tries to get Siddharth to understand, but he manipulates her. Misha learns from Piya that Shaurya is gay and loves Shankar who is trying to impress Misha but fails and tells Shaurya that they can be good friends.

Arnab and Madhu's 25th anniversary arrives, and Misha prepares a collage of their old pictures, including the picture of Sugandh from their college days. Piya is very hurt because she does not want to see her father once again forsake her mother publicly, so she asks Abhay to get the CD before it is played at the party. But Abhay is caught by Kabir and Misha, who call the entire family into the office. Everyone humiliates him, but Piya tries to take his side, which leads to a fight between Misha and Piya. When Arnab discovers only the CD with Abhay, he realises what was happening. Angry at her father, who is still silent, Piya lashes out at him, asking him to act in a way at least once in his lifetime which won't humiliate her. This angers Misha, who pushes Piya into a bookshelf. Piya immediately faints. Arnab admits that he loves Piya very much, and he loved her mother too, which shocks Panchi and Misha. They call a doctor, but Abhay takes Piya away, claiming that she never wanted to do anything with Arnab then and doesn't now either. Piya has vampire blood in her, and if anyone does any tests on her, the truth would emerge, which the Raichands cannot allow. Madhu discloses that Arnab and Sugandh were in love and wanted to get married but faced family opposition in their relationship. While Arnab was still depressed, Madhu took advantage of the situation and asked her father to send a proposal to Arnab's family and get them married. Later, when Arnab and Sugandh met again, they were still in love and started a relationship. However, when Sugandh asked him to take a stand for them, Arnab backed away. Sugandh asked her neighbours to tell Arnab that she and her daughter died in a car crash. Misha leaves home, angry at her father for cheating. Chand and Haseena tell Piya that they will support her if necessary, but she finally decides to join her family. In a dance competition, when Piya and Abhay dance together, Siddharth buys the vote of a judge and makes Mount College lose. Danish and Arnab find out but Siddharth attacks and kidnaps Arnab. He is let go after a threat against Panchi. Arnab, Danish, and Abhay make a plan to expose Siddharth. Arnab goes to Manali, but while returning, there is a landslide. Both Arnab and Chand are stuck and hurt. Arnab tries to tell Panchi to stay away from Siddharth, but his words are misconstrued, and everyone thinks he wants them to get married. In the chaos, Misha also returns and forgives everyone, while Piya finds out that she was bitten by Abhay. She breaks up with him.

Piya goes to Siddharth to learn the truth about the Raichands. He takes her to the old Haveli, where Maithili, Abhayendra, and Siddharth lived as kids. Piya finds out that Siddharth is the elder brother, and Maithili is also alive because Siddharth changed her into a vampire that fateful night. Maithili is angry with Abhay because she thinks that he left her for dead and now loves Piya, and she intends on drinking Piya's blood: when a vampire drinks his/her doppelganger's blood, they gain immeasurable powers. However, Piya telepathically contacts Abhay, and he, Chand, and Haseena reach the place to save her. At the Dobriyal House, Arnab is well again, and he calls Mr Hasni, who deals with the supernatural, to reveal the truth about Siddharth to the family. Hasni explains about Siddharth and realizes that Siddharth wants Piya and Panchi was simply a mode to get to her. Misha and Panchi also leave with Hasni to save Piya. They get to her in the palace, but the person who comes out is Maithili in Piya's clothes. Siddharth, on realising that Piya is linked telepathically to Abhay, takes her away from the place, along with T, who had unwittingly entered the palace to expose Siddharth and Piya's 'affair'. Piya harms Siddharth with her silver chain and runs away with T. Chand and Haseena reach her and tell her to take leaves that keep her safe from vampires and run away.

Misha is soon suspicious of this Piya who is Maithili and tells her that she is happy they know they are not sisters. When Maithili agrees, she discreetly messages Panchi, and they run away while Maithili's back is turned. However, Maithili catches up with them and "mind-links" Piya to get there to save her sisters. Piya returns, Hasni and Abhay meet, and Abhay understands that they are fighting on the same side. Siddharth is assisted by a werewolf and has him attack Chand and Haseena, but Abhay reaches just in time to save them and kills the werewolf. Then he and Siddharth fight, and Abhay kills Siddharth by piercing his heart with a stake. Maithili is angry with Abhay and wants to fight him, and Abhay tells Piya to run away. Piya meets her family but doesn't want to leave Abhay alone. In the forest, Hasni is dead because of Siddhath biting him, and Maithili is fighting with Abhay. She tells him that she loves him so she cannot kill him, he loved her, so he cannot kill her, and she cannot kill Piya because she is Abhay's love now. So she puts a slab of ice on Abhay and tells him that until Piya dies of natural causes and Abhay forgets her, he will remain there frozen. After Piya dies, Maithili will return for him. In his last moments, Abhay gets to Piya and wipes her memory of him. He becomes buried under the snow, frozen, as Arnab and Madhu arrive to take Piya with them.

=== One year later ===
One year has passed, and Piya returns to Dehradun from Paris, as Piya Dobriyal where Arnab and Madhu had sent her with Misha for peace. Piya is now a supermodel. She doesn't remember anything about her time at Dehradun, yet she is repeatedly attracted to the spot where Abhay is left frozen. She meets Jeh Khurana, who is a new student in Mount College. A mysterious guy is in a hunt for Abhay to take retribution on him for killing his brother. Piya saves Abhay from his condition. He is again impolite and mean to her, and she is confused about her thoughts, feeling both repulsed and fascinated by him. The Raichand family returns to Dehradun and a business rivalry starts between them and the Khuranas. Khuranas, which include Depanita, Nil and Jeh, now live in the same mansion which was once owned by Raichands.

Chand, while wandering in the jungle is attacked by werewolves and mortally wounded. Abhay and Haseena locate him and take him home. Abhay finds a college ID card belonging to an unknown Mount College student. In order to save Chand, he needs the blood of a werewolf within 7 days. Abhay rejoins the college and traces the ID number which leads him to a Chiragh Doshi. Thinking him to be a werewolf and in order to kill him, Abhay asks the college principal to immediately organize an inter college boxing competition. He intentionally sets up his match against Chiragh. A day before the match, Abhay also gets attacked by a werewolf. He successfully defends himself and inflicts a scratch on the werewolf's chest so that he can identify him later. The boxing match begins and Abhay injures Chiragh with a single punch. Nil, sitting as a judge, interrupts the fight along with his brother Jeh but both get knocked out by Abhay. Abhay looks at Chiragh's chest but finds no scratch mark there and realizes that he pinpointed the wrong person.

Hopeless and running out of time, Abhay with his blood-filled hands brings Chand in contact with the blood. Chand recovers and a surprised Abhay then realizes that he had seen the scratch mark on Nil's chest. Meanwhile, Danish brings information about Khuranas to the Raichands and tells them that they have no past and they came from nowhere. The Raichands conclude that Khuranas are in fact, the werewolves. Chand and Haseena plan to kill Neil without involving Abhay. Abhay and Misha start a fake relationship to keep Piya away from remembering anything about her past. Panchi tells Misha that she hates Nil and wants to end her engagement with him. Misha goes to Nil and warns him. Neil gets kidnapped by Chand and Haseena and is critically injured. Misha goes to find him and is also caught by the two but Abhay arrives in time and frees Misha and take Nil back to his home. Chand and Haseena also follow him and wait for him outside the Khuranas house. Inside the house, Abhay finds the picture of the werewolf he killed while fighting against Sidharth. He realizes that the Khuranas are here to take revenge for their dead family member and to bring him back to life with Abhay's blood. Depanita calls two werewolves as backup who fight and cage Chand and Haseena. Abhay kills the two attacking werewolves. He now wants to save Piya from Jeh because he knows his true identity.

In the meantime, Piya and Jeh become best of friends. Battles begin between the witty vampires and the cunning werewolves. Piya uses Misha's bike to go home from the college but loses control while avoiding an oncoming vehicle. She loses consciousness after getting hit by a boulder. Both Jeh and Abhay go to save her and Jeh decides to take her to his home. The person from the oncoming vehicle is later revealed to be Jeh's sister, Alina, who was held captive for three years by Depanita. Piya gets better and Abhay takes her back to her home. Meanwhile, Arnab invites both Khuranas and Raichands to a dinner and discusses his suspicions about the Raichands being the vampires with Depanita. After the dinner, both families go to their homes but on the way, Depanita stops the Raichands and challenges them to a battle. Haseena gets injured during the fight and Depanita attacks Chand but Abhay intercepts and kills her with a blunt wooden stick. Piya watches and informs Jeh about this. Jeh quickly arrives and takes Depanita home. He knows that Depanita can only be saved by a woman who is the direct descendant of Depanita within a span of 6 hours. Piya contacts the police and Abhay is arrested for murder. The police also summons Jeh but both Jeh and Abhay deny the allegations. Police want to see Depanita. Jeh calls Neil and tells him that they have only 15 minutes. Neil asks Alina to save her mother; she refuses initially but later agrees. She tries to revive Depanita but is not strong enough to do it. As a last resort, she consumes the remaining spirit of her dead brother and uses it to revive Depanita. Depanita is alive but is angry with Alina because she lost her son in the process. Depanita commands her children to take revenge for their dead brother and to eliminate Abhay. The Jeh and Abhay rivalry reaches its peak.

Meanwhile, an employee of Khuranas named Tyagi is working secretly for the Raichands. Depanita realizes this, kills Tyagi and pins the blame on Raichands. Police arrest Haseena for the murder. Abhay makes a plan to trap Depanita. He uses a fake witness to make Depanita confess. The police arrest Depanita and release Haseena. The vampire clan, impressed by Abhay's intelligence and strength, declare him their new leader. Jeh kidnaps Piya and asks Abhay to return his mother in exchange for Piya. Jeh hands Piya over to Neil. Alina tells Misha about this. Misha, Panchi and Danish track Neil and rescue Piya. Depanita escapes from prison and leaves the city. Neil is killed by Raichands the next day and his body is found by Arnab and Madhu. Arnab finds vampire bites on Nil's neck and informs Jeh. Abhay is also angry with his parents for killing Neil.

At this crucial point, Piya regains her memory and reunites with Abhay. However, he worries about her safety, so they tell nobody about their relationship. Alina, Jeh's sister, falls in love with Abhay, and he agrees to be with her only to shield Piya. Now Mathili is back and casts a spell on Haseena, compelling her to kill Tanushree and uses her body to hide her presence. When Abhay and Alina are looking for a magical potion, he tells her about his past. A clash takes place between Haseena and Dipanita leading Piya to learn the truth about Khuranas. The vampires and werewolves fight and Mathili uses the opportunity and takes Haseena's form to put a spell on Abhay. In Mount College's Halloween Party, Abhay tries to kill Piya by drinking her blood under the spell but emerges from the spell in time. Mathili impersonates Piya to locate the magical potion. Another clash takes place, during which Haseena kills Dipanita Mathili bites Panchi. Abhay saves Piya from Mathili's spell and Jeh murders Abhay. Chand and Haseena take Abhay's body back to their home. They need the potion to save Abhay within twelve hours. The clan leader sends some vampires over to extract Abhay's soul and use it to gain more power. The vampires make a symbolic formation and perform black magic on Abhay. Chand and Haseena suspect there's something wrong with the ritual and go to Arnab. He tells them the truth about the symbology. Piya tries to find the magical potion with the help of clues given by Abhay and Piya and Alina succeed in saving Abhay.

The vampires imprison Chand, Haseena and Arnab. Jeh, along with Maithli, enters the Raichands' house. He frees Chand and Haseena and helps them save Abhay. Now, Abhay turns into a human being with the help of the potion and Maithili is killed by vampires after she and Siddharth are exposed. Arnab asks the vampire to let him see his family one last time. He sees them without meeting them and realizes her love for Madhu and is then taken away by the vampire. Abhay and Piya go to hospital to save Panchi but Abhay, now a human being, is unable to save her leading to her death. Piya informs Misha about she and Abhay leaving Dehradun for a new beginning.

=== Three months later ===
Misha and Kabir's wedding is arranged. Jeh now owner of Khurana business tries to locate Abhay for revenge. Abhay and Piya now living in Mumbai enjoying their lives and plans to get married soon. Jeh kidnaps Piya for revenge and Alina hates her brother for this action. Abhay knows that he can't stand against Jeh so he goes to the vampire leader for help. The acting leader of vampires is revealed to be Arnab. Abhay offers his soul for helping him. Learning that Piya is in danger, Arnab agrees to help Abhay. Alina tells Abhay that Piya is held captive by Jeh in Pandher Palace. A battle ensues, and Jeh is killed by Arnab. Both Abhay and Arnab return to the vampire clan and ask the Supreme Leader for his decision on their lives. The leader spares both of them because of their human emotions. At last, Arnab changes into a human and attends Misha and Kabir's wedding. The next day, the show ends on a happy note with the wedding of Abhay and Piya.

== Cast ==
=== Main ===
- Vivian Dsena as Vampire Abhay Raichand/Abhayendra Singh: A 200-year-old vampire, later human; Chand and Haseena's adopted son; Siddharth's brother; Maithili's former lover; Piya's husband
- Sukirti Kandpal as
  - Piya Dobriyal Raichand/Piyali/ Piyashree Jaiswal: A 17-year-old girl, Arnab and Sugandh's daughter; Madhu's step-daughter; Panchi and Misha's half-sister; Abhay's wife
  - Princess Maithili: 19th century Princess of Pandher kingdom as human; Piya's doppelganger; Abhay's former obsessive lover; Siddharth's love interest. She was turned vampire by Siddharth.

=== Recurring cast ===
- Priya Wal as Misha Dobriyal Rathore: Arnab and Madhu's younger daughter; Panchi's sister; Piya's half-sister; Kabir's wife
- Rithvik Dhanjani as Jeh Khurana: The werewolf; Dipanita's son; Alina's brother; Neel's adopted brother; Piya's obsessive lover
- Naved Aslam as Chand Raichand: Vampire; Haseena's husband; Siddharth and Abhay's adoptive father
- Kishwer Merchant as Haseena Raichand: Vampire; Chand's wife; Siddharth and Abhay's adoptive mother
- Siddhant Karnick as Siddharth Raichand/Mehra: Chand and Haseena's adopted son; Abhay's elder brother; Maithili's obsessive lover; Panchi's boss and former love interest
- Vahbbiz Dorabjee as Panchi Dobriyal: Arnab and Madhu's elder daughter; Misha's elder sister; Piya's eldest half-sister; Danish and Neel's ex-fiancée; Siddharth's employee and former love interest (Dead)
- Vishal Gandhi as Kabir Singh Rathore: Danish's cousin; Misha's husband; Angad's best friend
- Anupam Bhattacharya as Arnab Dobriyal: Sugandh's ex-lover; Madhu's husband; Piya, Panchi and Misha's father
- Papiya Sengupta as Madhu Dobriyal: Arnab's wife; Panchi and Misha's mother; Piya's step-mother.
- Madhura Naik as Tanushree "T" Ambolkar: Kabir's ex-girlfriend
- Priya Chauhan as Alina Khurana: Dipanita's daughter; Jeh's sister; Neel's adopted sister; Abhay's lover
- Suyyash Rai as Neel Khurana: Dipanita's adopted son; Jeh and Elina's adopted brother; Panchi's ex-fiancé
- Karuna Verma as Dipanita Khurana: Jeh and Alina's mother; Neel's adoptive mother (Dead)
- Tabrez Khan as Danish Singh Rathore: Panchi's ex-fiancé; Kabir's cousin
- Neetha Shetty as Sugandh Jaiswal: Arnab's ex-lover; Piya's mother
- Hetal Gada as Piyali Jaiswal (younger)
- Roshani Shetty as Ruhi Juneja: Angad's wife
- Anshuman Singh Mahant as Angad: Ruhi's husband; Kabir's best friend
- Tanvi Thakkar as Maya Sharma: Danish's ex-girlfriend
- Gautam Gulati as Shaurya Khanna: A gay engineer; Misha's former love interest
- Yash Gera as Shankar aka Pintu: Mount college professor; Shaurya's friend; Misha's former lover
- Shamta Tiwari as Shamta: T's minion
- Vikram Sahu as Mr. Rathore: Kabir's father
- Abhidnya Bhave as Abhidnya: Tracker's minion
- Monica Castelino as Miss Shanaya: Sports teacher
- Malika Juneja as Malika: T's minion

=== Guest appearances ===
- Nishant Singh Malkani as Adhiraj (from Miley Jab Hum Tum)
- Sanaya Irani as Gunjan (from Miley Jab Hum Tum)
- Drashti Dhami as Geet (from Geet - Hui Sabse Parayi)
- Gurmeet Choudhary as Mann (from Geet - Hui Sabse Parayi)

== See also ==
- List of vampire television series
