= Vahbbiz Dorabjee =

Indian television actress and model (born 1985)

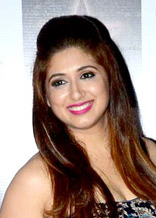
- Vahbbiz at Pride Gallantry Awards in 2016
- Born: 28 November 1985 (age 40); Pune, Maharashtra, India
- Occupations: Actress; model
- Years active: 2010–present
- Known for: Panchi Dobriyal in Pyaar Kii Ye Ek Kahaani
- Spouse: Vivian Dsena (m. 2013; div. 2016)

Vahbbiz Dorabjee is an Indian television actress and model.

== Career ==
Vahbiz Dorabjee made her television debut with the television serial Pyaar Kii Ye Ek Kahaani, playing the role of Panchi Dobriyal from 18 October 2010 to 15 December 2011. In 2013, she played the role of Alak in the television series Saraswatichandra.

== Personal life ==
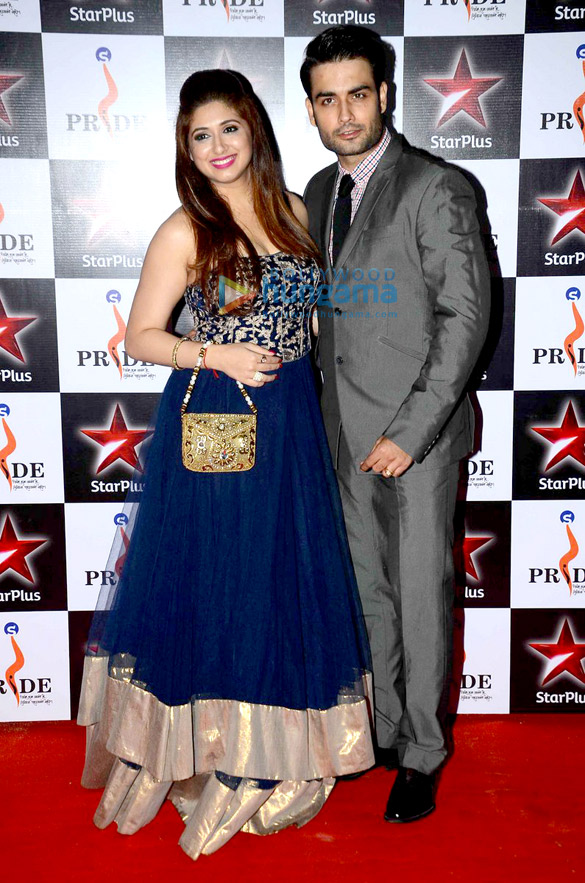
Vahbbiz Dorabjee with her ex-husband Vivian Dsena

She was born in Pune, Maharashtra, into a Parsi family. Her father's name is Jehangir Dorabjee, and mother's name is Firoza Dorabjee. They are well-known entrepreneurs of Pune.

In 2013, Dorabjee married her Pyaar Kii Ye Ek Kahaani co-star Vivian Dsena. They got divorced in 2016.

== Television ==
Year	Show	Role	Channel	Ref
2010–2011	Pyaar Kii Ye Ek Kahani	Panchi Dobriyal	Star One	
2013	Savitri	Vishkamini	Life OK	
2013	Saraswatichandra	Alak Kishori Dharmadhikari	Star Plus	
2016–2017	Bahu Hamari Rajni Kant	Maggie	Life OK	
2021	Hiccups and Hookups	Meenakshi Bhanohur	Lionsgate Play	
2024	Deewaniyat	Babita Chaudhary	Star Plus	

== See also ==
- List of Indian television actresses
