= Vivian Dsena =

Indian actor (born 1988)

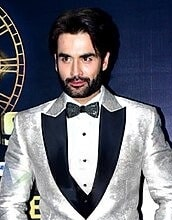
- Dsena in 2024
- Born: 28 June 1988 (age 38); Ujjain, Madhya Pradesh, India
- Education: Lokmanya Tilak High School; Bhonsala Military School
- Occupations: Actor, model
- Years active: 2008–present
- Known for: Pyaar Kii Ye Ek Kahaani; Madhubala - Ek Ishq Ek Junoon; Shakti - Astitva Ke Ehsaas Ki
- Spouses: Vahbbiz Dorabjee (m. 2013; div. 2021); Nouran Aly (m. 2022)
- Children: 2
- Awards: see list

Vivian Dsena (pronounced [ˈʋɪʋɪjən d̪ˈseːnaː]; (born 28 June 1988) is an Indian actor and former model who works predominantly in Hindi television. As a prominent figure in Indian television, Dsena has received several accolades, including two Indian Television Academy Awards, two Indian Telly Awards, two Gold Awards and an Asian Viewers Television Award.

Dsena made his acting debut with the Indian television soap opera Kasamh Se in 2008. He later received wider reach for his portrayal of Abhay Raichand in the supernatural teen drama Pyaar Kii Ye Ek Kahaani (2010–2011). He then played Rishabh Kundra, the superstar in the romantic drama Madhubala – Ek Ishq Ek Junoon (2012–2014), Harman Singh in the social drama Shakti – Astitva Ke Ehsaas Ki (2016–2019) and Ranveer Oberoi in the romantic drama Sirf Tum (2021–2022). Dsena played a cameo role of Sartaj Singh Randhawa in the romantic drama Udaariyaan (2023). He also participated in reality shows such as Jhalak Dikhhla Jaa season 8 (2015), Khatron Ke Khiladi 7 (2016) and Bigg Boss 18 (2024). He joined the third season of the cooking based comedy show Laughter Chefs in 2025.

== Early life ==
Dsena was born on 28 June 1988 in Ujjain, Madhya Pradesh, India. His mother is Hindu, while his father is Christian. His father is of Portuguese descent. His paternal grandfather was Portuguese and his paternal grandmother was of British descent. He studied at Lokmanya Tilak High School in Mumbai, where he completed his schooling up to Class 12.

He also studied at the Bhonsala Military School in Nashik, Maharashtra for two years. He passed the Madhya Pradesh State-Level Engineering Entrance Exam and initially pursued engineering. He had also cleared the All India Engineering Entrance Examination as well, but as modelling was his passion so he pursued that.

He is also a national level football player.

== Career ==
=== 2007–2008: Early modelling success and acting debut ===
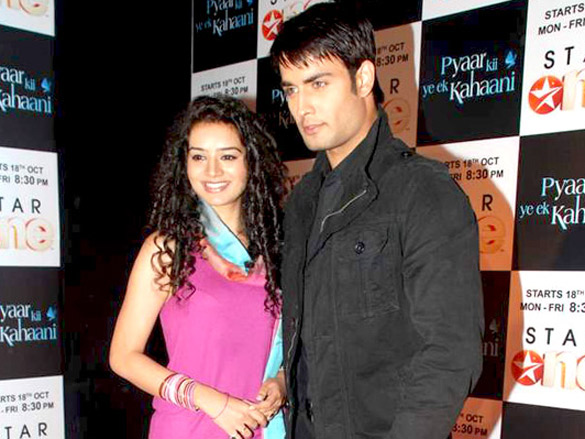
Sukirti Kandpal and Dsena at the launch of Pyaar Kii Ye Ek Kahaani

Dsena's career started with a call from Gladrags Manhunt and Megamodel Contest. He came to Mumbai from Ujjain to be a model, and was among the top 10 finalists in Gladrags Manhunt contest in 2007. He later walked the ramp for designers like Vikram Phadnis. Dsena has said he was rejected 350 to 400 times. He made his television debut in 2008 with Zee TV's Kasamh Se by playing the role of Vicky jai Walia. This was followed by his next project Agnipareeksha Jeevan Ki – Gangaa which aired on Colors TV where he played the role of Shivam. Later in 2010, he played a double role in Star One TV's supernatural romance Pyaar Kii Ye Ek Kahaani as Abhay Raichand and Abhayendra Singh opposite Sukirti Kandpal. The show was the first youth centric supernatural series in India, inspired by The Vampire Diaries and Twilight Saga. The show aired its last episode on 15 December 2011 and established Dsena as a television actor.

In 2012, he played a triple role in Colors TV's Madhubala – Ek Ishq Ek Junoon as Rishabh Kundra, Keval Ram Kushwaha and Raja Kushwaha opposite Drashti Dhami. The performance of Dsena received numerous accolades and nominations including the ITA Award for Performer of the Year, Gold Award for Best Actor in a Lead Role and AVTA for Best Personality of the Year. Madhubala – Ek Ishq Ek Junoon has been broadcast in over 50 countries.

In 2015, Dsena participated in Colors TV's dance reality show, Jhalak Dikhhla Jaa 8 and finished in 10th place. In 2016, he again participated in the Colors TV's stunt-based reality TV show Fear Factor: Khatron Ke Khiladi 7, which was filmed in Argentina and ended as a finalist.

=== 2016–present: established actor ===
From 2016 to 2019, Dsena portrayed Harman Singh, in Colors TV's long-running popular show Shakti – Astitva Ke Ehsaas Ki for which he was awarded a Gold Award for Best Actor (Critics) and ITA Award for Best Actor Drama Popular. The show's story revolved around the transgender love story of Saumya (played by Rubina Dilaik) and Harman. The show completed 700 episodes. Dsena exited the show in 2019, citing his preference for not playing a father to a grown-up actor. From 2021 to 2022, Dsena portrayed the role of Ranveer Oberoi, on Colors TV's romantic drama Sirf Tum opposite Eisha Singh. He lost 10 kg of weight for his role. It was considered a success, with 232 episodes. In 2023, he made a brief appearance in Udaariyaan as Dr. Sartaj Singh Randhawa. Dsena's entry made a significant impact on the show's viewership and TRP ratings.

In 2024, Dsena was a contestant in the eighteenth season of Bigg Boss, the Indian version of the reality TV show Big Brother. He stayed in the house for 105 days and emerged as the 1st runner up. He was the highest-paid contestant on Bigg Boss 18. He appeared on the first episode of Munawar Faruqui's talk show, "Hafta Vasooli," on JioHotstar. The episode featured discussions about Vivian's life, including his time on "Bigg Boss 18". He was last seen on Laughter Chefs as a guest, reuniting with his former co-star Rubina Dilaik for a Holi special episode.

From November 2025 to January 2026, Dsena joined the third season of the cooking based comedy show Laughter Chefs. He was touted as the highest-paid contestant and this time he charging Rs 5 lakhs per episode.

== Personal life ==
In 2013, Dsena married his Pyaar Kii Ye Ek Kahaani co-actress Vahbbiz Dorabjee. They separated in 2016 and their divorce was finalised in December 2021. He later married Nouran Aly, an Egyptian journalist in 2022. They have a daughter together. Dsena converted to Islam in 2019 and is a practicing Muslim. Before his conversion to Islam, he was a Christian. The couple's second child, a son, was born in March 2026.

== Media image and other work ==
In 2014, Dsena was included in Rediff's Television's Top 10 Actors list. Since 2013, Dsena has been placed on The Times of India Most Desirable Television Men list. He was ranked 31st in 2013, 4th in 2018 and 11th position in 2019 list. Between 2013 and 2021, Dsena's name appeared on Eastern Eye's list of 50 Sexiest Asian Men. He was ranked 24th in 2013, 5th in 2015, 7th in 2016, 4th in 2017, 2nd in 2018 and 3rd position in both 2019 and 2021.

Dsena is a football enthusiast. Since 2013, he has also been an active part of the All Star Football Club, a celebrity football club that raises funds for charity. He has also participated in the Gold Charity Soccer matches to raise funds for supporting the junior artists of the industry. Dsena has also played in a charity soccer match against the FWICE and in a celebrity football cup in Dubai. He has been honored by the Bahrain government for his contributions to the entertainment industry, becoming the first Indian television actor to receive this recognition.

== Filmography ==
=== Television ===
Year	Title	Role	Notes	Ref.
2008–2009	Kasamh Se	Vicky Jai Walia		
2010	Agnipareeksha Jeevan Ki – Gangaa	Shivam		
2010–2011	Pyaar Kii Ye Ek Kahaani	Abhay Raichand		
2011	Pyaar Kii Ye Ek Kahaani	Abhayendra Singh		
2012–2014	Madhubala Ek Ishq Ek Junoon	Rishabh Kundra		
2013–2014	Madhubala Ek Ishq Ek Junoon	Keval Ram Kushwaha		
2014	Madhubala Ek Ishq Ek Junoon	Raja Kushwaha		
2013	Jhalak Dikhhla Jaa 6	Himself	Guest	
2015	Comedy Nights with Kapil	Himself	Guest	
2015	Jhalak Dikhhla Jaa 8	Contestant	10th place	
2016	Fear Factor: Khatron Ke Khiladi 7	Contestant	5th place	
2015–2016	India's Got Talent	Himself	Guest	
2016–2019	Shakti – Astitva Ke Ehsaas Ki	Harman Singh/Jolly		
2018	Bigg Boss 12	Himself	Guest	
2021	Bigg Boss 15	Himself	Guest	
2021–2022	Sirf Tum	Ranveer Oberoi		
2023	Udaariyaan	Dr. Sartaj Singh Randhawa		
2024–2025	Bigg Boss 18	Contestant	1st Runner-up	
2025	Hafta Vasooli	Himself	Guest	
2025	Laughter Chefs – Unlimited Entertainment season 2	Himself	Guest	
2025–2026	Laughter Chefs – Unlimited Entertainment 3	Contestant		

== Awards and nominations ==
Year	Award	Category	Show	Result	Ref.
2012	Indian Television Academy Awards	GR8! Performer of the Year (Male)	Madhubala - Ek Ishq Ek Junoon	Won	
2013	Indian Telly Awards	Best Actor in Lead Role (Male)	Madhubala - Ek Ishq Ek Junoon	Nominated	
2013	Indian Telly Awards	Best Onscreen Couple (With Drashti Dhami)	Madhubala - Ek Ishq Ek Junoon	Won	
2013	Gold Awards	Best Actor in Lead Role (Jury)	Madhubala - Ek Ishq Ek Junoon	Won	
2013	Gold Awards	Best Actor in Lead Role (Popular)	Madhubala - Ek Ishq Ek Junoon	Nominated	
2013	Indian Television Academy Awards	Best Actor Popular	Madhubala - Ek Ishq Ek Junoon	Nominated	
2014	Asian Viewers Television Awards	Jaguar Male Personality of the Year	Madhubala - Ek Ishq Ek Junoon	Won	
2014	Indian Telly Awards	Best Onscreen Couple (with Drashti Dhami)	Madhubala - Ek Ishq Ek Junoon	Nominated	
2017	Indian Television Academy Awards	Best Actor (Popular)	Shakti - Astitva Ke Ehsaas Ki	Won	
2017	Indian Television Academy Awards	Best Actor Male (Jury)	Shakti - Astitva Ke Ehsaas Ki	Nominated	
2018	Gold Awards	Best Actor Male (Critics)	Shakti - Astitva Ke Ehsaas Ki	Won	
2018	Gold Awards	Best Actor Male (Popular)	Shakti - Astitva Ke Ehsaas Ki	Nominated	
2018	Gold Awards	Best Jodi (With Rubina Dilaik)	Shakti - Astitva Ke Ehsaas Ki	Nominated	
2018	Indian Television Academy Awards	Best Actor (Popular)	Shakti - Astitva Ke Ehsaas Ki	Nominated	
2019	Indian Telly Awards	Best Actor in Lead Role Male (Popular)	Shakti - Astitva Ke Ehsaas Ki	Nominated	
2019	Indian Telly Awards	Best Jodi (Popular) (with Rubina Dilaik)	Shakti - Astitva Ke Ehsaas Ki	Nominated	
2019	Gold Awards	Best Actor Male (Popular)	Shakti - Astitva Ke Ehsaas Ki	Nominated	
2025	Indian Telly Awards	Fan Favourite TV Personality of the year	Bigg Boss 18	Won	

== See also ==
- List of Indian television actors
- List of Hindi television actors
