= Drashti Dhami =

Indian actress, model, and dancer (born 1985)

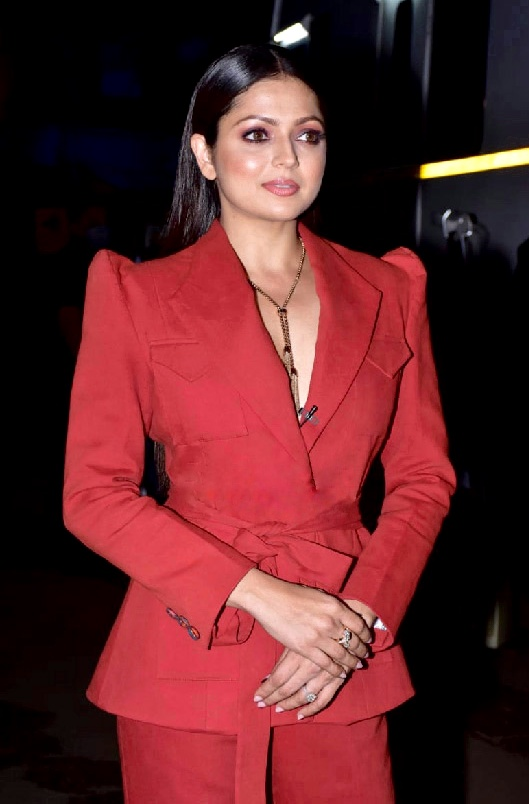
- Dhami in 2021
- Born: 10 January 1985 (age 41); Mumbai, Maharashtra, India
- Education: Degree in sociology
- Occupations: Actress; model; dancer
- Years active: 2003–2019, 2021–2023
- Spouse: Niraj Khemka (m. 2015)
- Children: 1
- Relatives: Suhasi Goradia Dhami (sister-in-law)

Drashti Dhami (pronounced [ˈd̪ɾəʃʈi ˈd̪ʱaːmi]; born 10 January 1985) is an Indian actress, model and dancer who works predominantly in Hindi television. Dhami is considered among the most popular Hindi television actresses, she is a recipient of several accolades including one ITA Award, one Indian Telly Award and two Gold Awards.

She has been part of successful shows like, Dill Mill Gayye (2007-2010), Geet (2010-2011), Madhubala (2012-2014), Ek Tha Raja Ek Thi Rani (2015-2017) and Silsila Badalte Rishton Ka (2018). Dhami also participated into dance reality show Jhalak Dikhhla Jaa 6 (2013), with choreographer Salman Yusuff Khan and emerged as the winner. She has also ventured into web series with period drama The Empire (2021), portraying Khanzada Begum (2022), and ZEE5 crime thriller Duranga portraying Ira Jaykar.

In addition to her acting career, she is the celebrity endorser for several brands and products. Dhami is married to businessman Niraj Khemka.

== Early life and family ==
Dhami was born on 10 January 1985 into a Gujarati family in Mumbai, where she studied. She attended Mary Immaculate Girl's High School and also went to Mumbai's Mithibai College from where she has a degree in sociology. Before entering into modelling, Dhami was a dance instructor Dhami belongs to a conservative family. According to her interview in The Times of India, she said:

When I got [the] offer to dance in a music video ... I had to seek permission from ten different family members including my closest relatives. It was my cousin who supported me, convinced everyone and still stands by me whenever I have to take a decision on my career front. So it's not been so easy for me but my family's support is always with me."

On 21 February 2015, Dhami married businessman Niraj Khemka in a traditional Hindu ceremony. Suhasi Dhami, also an actress, is married to her elder brother Jaisheel Dhami. Dhami said that her in-laws are very supportive when it comes to her work. On 22 October 2024, Dhami gave birth to their first child, a girl.

== Career ==
=== Career beginnings and Geet Hui Sabse Parayi (2007–2011) ===
Dhami started her career in modelling for print and television advertisements before debuting in the entertainment industry with her appearance in the music video "Saiyyan Dil Mein Aana Re" followed by "Humko Aaj Kal Hai", "Teri Meri Nazar Ki Dori" and "Nachle Soniyo Tu" and worked in advertisements like Colgate, Lion Honey, Pulimoottil Silks, Vasan Eyecare, RKS Grand, Amul, VIP Bags, Chevrolet and Reliance.

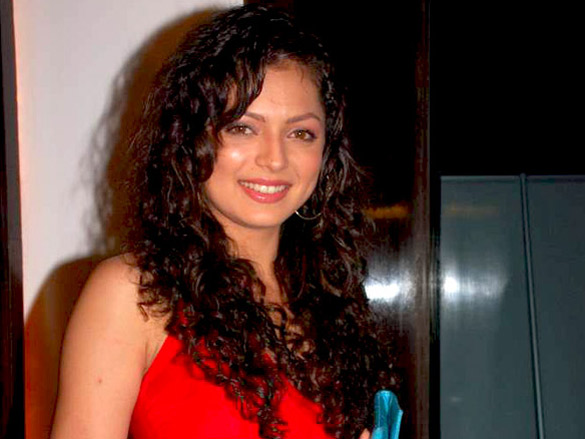
Dhami at Dill Mill Gayye's party in 2010

Dhami made her acting debut in television with Star One's popular show Dill Mill Gayye, where she portrayed Dr. Muskaan Chadda from 2007 to 2009. In 2008, she participated in the reality show, Kaun Jeetega Bollywood Ka Ticket by Ekta Kapoor. In 2010, she appeared as the female lead in Star One's Geet – Hui Sabse Parayi opposite Gurmeet Choudhary. Dhami got recognition with her portrayal of the character Geet with this role. The show ended in December 2011 after the channel got closed.

Dhami made an appearance on Imagine TV's reality show Big Money: Chota Parda Bada Game in 2010. The same year, she was also a part of another reality show, Nachle Ve with Saroj Khan.

=== Recognition with Madhubala and Jhalak Dikhhla Jaa 6 (2012–2018) ===
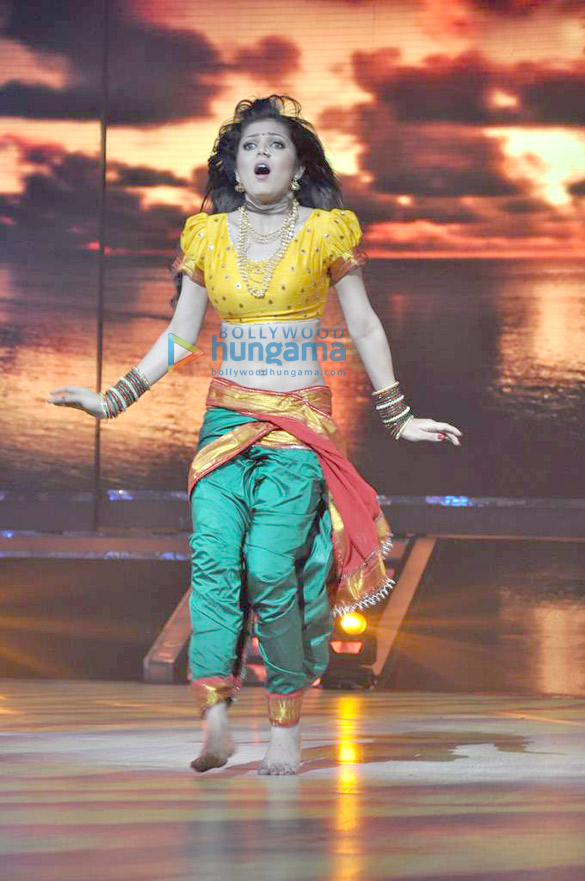
Dhami on the sets of Jhalak Dikhhla Jaa 6

In May 2012, Dhami made a guest appearance on the show Na Bole Tum Na Maine Kuch Kaha. Later, she played the lead role in Colors TV's show Madhubala – Ek Ishq Ek Junoon opposite to Vivian Dsena from 2012 to 2014. In 2013, Dhami participated in Colors TV's popular dance reality show, Jhalak Dikhhla Jaa 6 and emerged as the winner alongside her choreographer Salman Yusuff Khan. In June 2014, Dhami hosted Jhalak Dikhhla Jaa 7. However, she later got replaced by Manish Paul. In December 2014, Dhami participated in Sony TV's Box Cricket League playing in the team Mumbai Warriors.

In 2015, Dhami played the role of Rani Gayatri in Zee TV's Ek Tha Raja Ek Thi Rani opposite Siddhant Karnick. While playing the role of Gayatri, Dhami said:

"I do feel a little under pressure since 'Madhubala' was such a success. But I am also looking forward to seeing my fans' reaction to my new show. Even my family and friends are very excited," "It found it difficult to speak in the dialect which people spoke at that time. That was challenging. Other than that, I did not have any issues with the role."

She quit the show in May 2016. The same year, she joined the web series I Don't Watch TV along with Karan Patel, Nakuul Mehta, Karan Wahi, Disha Parmar, Sanaya Irani, Kritika Kamra and many other TV celebrities.

In November 2016, Dhami joined Star Plus's Pardes Mein Hai Mera Dil as Naina Batra, opposite Arjun Bijlani. The show went off air in June 2017.

From June to October 2018, she played Nandini, a victim of domestic violence who falls in love with her best friend's husband in Colors TV's Silsila Badalte Rishton Ka, opposite Shakti Arora. A critic from India Today praised her, saying that she is equally good as another television actress Sriti Jha who also played a victim of domestic violence in the past. She quit the show in November 2018. In 2021, Drashti starred in the Web series "The Empire" based on the novel Empire of the Moghul by Alex Ruthford. Her acting was praised and she won an award in the popular actress category

=== Other appearances ===
In 2011, Dhami did special dance performances on shows like Chhoti Bahu - Sawar Ke Rang Rachi, Sajan Re Jhoot Mat Bolo and Pyaar Kii Ye Ek Kahaani. In 2012, she made a guest appearance on Colors TV's Na Bole Tum Na Maine Kuch Kaha to promote her show Madhubala.

In March 2013, she made a guest appearance on Nach Baliye 5 to support her brother Jaisheel Dhami and sister-in-law Suhasi Dhami. In June 2014, Dhami was seen on Colors TV's Mission Sapne and later made another appearance on Comedy Nights with Kapil. In September 2015, she was seen as a guest on Jhalak Dikhhla Jaa 8 to support Sanaya Irani.

== Other work and media image ==
Dhami was the brand ambassador for Canvironment Week 2011 and 2013 to support the cause of 'Save Our Planet'. In 2016, she was part of the Swachh Survekshan 2017 Initiative for an environmentally cleaner India (Swachh Bharat Abhiyan).

Dhami was also the captain for Team 'D' Celebrity Championship 2016, where six teams comprising 78 television personalities competed to help kids in need of education and food. She won, and received an award from 'I HELP A KID.COM' Celebrity Championship. In 2017, Dhami became the brand ambassador of Bajaj Brahmi Amla Ayurvedic Hair oil. In the same year, she did an advertisement for Godrej Soap with Ragini Khanna and Ekta Kaul.

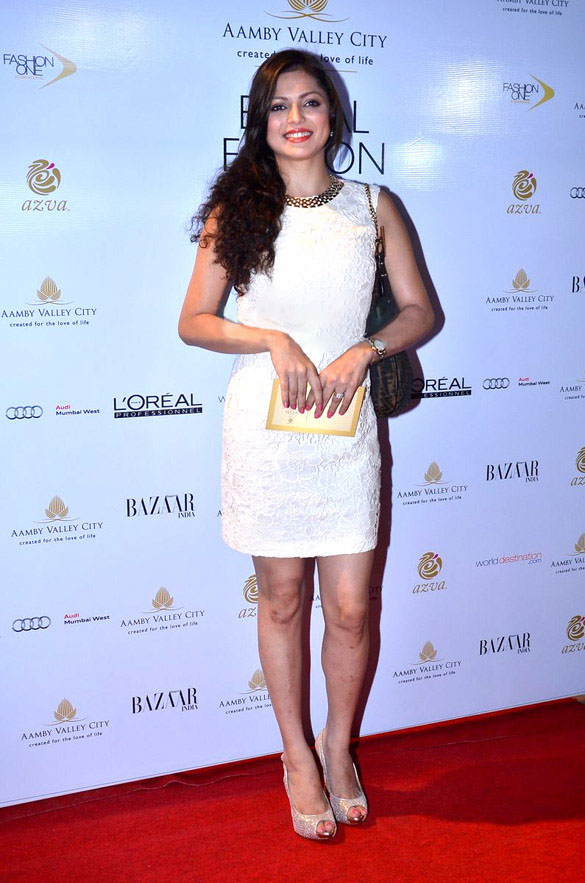
Dhami at an event in 2015

Bombay Times called her 'Numero Uno' actress on television. Dhami is also known for her style and fashion sense. Dhami is among the highest earning television actresses in India. In 2011, she was voted the most desirable woman on television in polls conducted by TellyChakkar.com. She is the brand ambassador of MATRIX India's hair colour brand, SoColor.

Dhami was included in second place on "Television's Top 10 Actresses" list by Rediff. Dhami also included in the top nine list of Indian television most stylish on-screen actress by Rediff. The UK-based newspaper Eastern Eye placed her in their "50 Sexiest Asian Women" list. In 2012, Eastern Eye placed her at twelfth position. Thereafter she remained in the top three spots for three consecutive years, listed at the third spot in 2013, the second spot in 2014, the third spot in 2015, the fourth spot in 2016, sixth spot in 2017, and twelfth spot in 2018. Dhami included in list of FHM India 100 Sexiest women of 2014 at tenth place. In 2016, Dhami was nominated in "Sexiest Woman" list by FHM India.

Dhami was listed eight among the "35 Hottest Actresses in Indian Television" by MensXP.com, an Indian lifestyle website for men. She was ranked in 38th position in The Times of India's 2014 list of "50 Most Desirable Women". According to the survey in India in 2017, Dhami was voted as desirable woman opposite to Hrithik Roshan in the list.

Dhami received an offer to participate in Bigg Boss but she rejected it. During her dance performance on Jhalak Dikhhla Jaa 6, film maker Karan Johar compared Dhami to film actress Zeenat Aman. Filmmaker Karan Johar complimented Dhami by saying that she is better than Kareena Kapoor when she performed in the song "Halkat Jawani" from the film Heroine on Jhalak Dikhhla Jaa 6.

== Filmography ==
=== Television ===
Year	Title	Role	Notes	Refs
2007–2009	Dill Mill Gayye	Dr. Muskaan Chaddha	Debut	
2008	Kaun Jeetega Bollywood Ka Ticket	Contestant	Finalist	
2010–2011	Geet – Hui Sabse Parayi	Geet Handa Singh Khurana	Main role	
2010	Nachle Ve with Saroj Khan	Contestant		
2012–2014	Madhubala – Ek Ishq Ek Junoon	Madhubala Malik Kundra/Madhubala Kundra Kushwaha	Main role	
2013	Jhalak Dikhhla Jaa 6	Contestant	Winner	
2014	Mission Sapne	Contestant		
2014	Jhalak Dikhhla Jaa 7	Host		
2014–2015	Box Cricket League 1	Contestant		
2015–2016	Ek Tha Raja Ek Thi Rani	Gayatri Seth / Rani Gayatri Devi / Savitri	Main role	
2016–2017	Pardes Mein Hai Mera Dil	Naina Batra	Main role	
2018–2019	Silsila Badalte Rishton Ka	Nandini Verma Malhotra	Main role	

==== Special appearances ====
Year	Show	Role	Refs
2009	Miley Jab Hum Tum	Herself	
2010	Big Money: Chota Parda Bada Game	Herself	
2010	Sapna Babul Ka...Bidaai	Geet Khurana	
2011	Rang Badalti Odhani	Geet Khurana	
2011	Pyaar Kii Ye Ek Kahaani	Geet Khurana	
2011	Chhoti Bahu - Sawar Ke Rang Rachi	Herself	
2011	Sajan Re Jhoot Mat Bolo	Herself	
2012	Na Bole Tum Na Maine Kuch Kaha	Madhubala	
2012	Balika Vadhu	Madhubala	
2013	Sasural Simar Ka	Madhubala	
2013	Nach Baliye 5	Herself	
2013	Iss Pyaar Ko Kya Naam Doon?...Ek Baar Phir	Herself	
2014	Beintehaa	Madhubala	
2014	Comedy Nights with Kapil	Herself	
2015	Jhalak Dikhhla Jaa 8	Guest Contestant	
2015	Jamai Raja	Gayatri	
2016	Yeh Hai Mohabbatein	Naina	
2016	Saath Nibhaana Saathiya	Naina	
2017	Yeh Rishta Kya Kehlata Hai	Naina	
2017	Ishqbaaz	Naina	
2017	Nach Baliye 8	Herself	
2018	Shakti - Astitva Ke Ehsaas Ki	Nandini	
2018	Naagin 3	Nandini	
2018	Dance Deewane	Nandini	
2019	Gathbandhan	Herself	
2019	Kumkum Bhagya	Herself	

=== Web series ===
Year	Name	Role	Notes	Ref
2016	I Don't Watch TV	Herself	Guest	
2021	The Empire	Khanzada Begum		
2022–2023	Duranga	Ira Jaykar Patel		

=== Short films ===
Year	Film	Notes	Refs
2016	The Change	Short Film	

=== Music videos ===
Year	Song	Singer	Notes	Ref
2003	Saiyyan Dil Mein Aana Re	Sneha Panth		
2004	Humko Aaj Kal Hai	Sarnali Bhowmik		
2005	Teri Meri Nazar Ki Dori			
2008	Nachle Soniyo Tu	Shael Oswal		

== Awards and nominations ==
Year	Award	Category	Show	Result
2011	Gold Awards	Most Celebrated Jodi (With Gurmeet Choudhary)	Geet - Hui Sabse Parayi	Won
2012	Indian Telly Awards	Best Onscreen Couple (With Gurmeet Choudhary)	Geet - Hui Sabse Parayi	Nominated
2013	Indian Telly Awards	Best Actress in a Lead Role	Madhubala - Ek Ishq Ek Junoon	Nominated
2013	Indian Telly Awards	Best Jodi (With Vivian Dsena)	Madhubala - Ek Ishq Ek Junoon	Won
2013	BIG Star Entertainment Awards	BIG Star Most Entertaining Television Actor - Female	Madhubala - Ek Ishq Ek Junoon	Nominated
2014	Star Guild Awards	Best Actress in a Drama Series	Madhubala - Ek Ishq Ek Junoon	Won
2014	Gold Awards	Best Actress (Critics)	Madhubala - Ek Ishq Ek Junoon	Won
2014	Indian Telly Awards	Best Actress in a Leading Role	Madhubala - Ek Ishq Ek Junoon	Nominated
2014	Indian Telly Awards	Best Onscreen Jodi (With Vivian Dsena)	Madhubala - Ek Ishq Ek Junoon	Nominated
2018	Indian Television Academy Awards	Best Actress (Popular)	Silsila Badalte Rishton Ka	Nominated
2018	Indian Television Academy Awards	Best Actress (Popular)	Silsila Badalte Rishton Ka	Nominated
2019	Indian Telly Awards	Best Actress (Jury)	Silsila Badalte Rishton Ka	Nominated
2021	Gold Glam and Style Awards	Fitness Icon (Female)	—N/a	Won
2021	Indian Television Academy Awards	Popular Actress Web	The Empire	Won
