= Mission Sapne =

- Presented by: Sonali Bendre
- Starring: Drashti Dhami
- Country of origin: India
- Original language: Hindi
- No. of seasons: 2
- No. of episodes: 20

Production
- Producer: SBF
- Production location: Film City
- Camera setup: Multi-camera
- Running time: 45 minutes
- Production company: SBF

Original release
- Network: Colors TV
- Release: 27 April 2014 – 20 March 2016

Mission Sapne (transl. Mission Dreams) is an Indian television reality show, the show is created by SBF. which airs on Colors TV. The first actor to appear on the show was Ranbir Kapoor. The first season ended on 27 April 2014.

Second season premiered on 17 January 2016 featuring Vidya Balan. The second season ended on 20 March 2016 with Alia Bhatt featuring in the final episode.

== Synopsis ==
The show is about upbringing people who have struggled in their life but never left their spirit to achieve something. The show will help these people to achieve dreams which they've dreamed of. The show will financially help these people by inviting Celebrities who will do the same daily job which these people do like driving auto rickshaw or selling something. The amount which the celebrity will earn will be multiplied by 100.

== Guests ==
S. No.	Guest	Date
1	Ranbir Kapoor	27 April 2014
2	Mika Singh	4 May 2014
3	Varun Dhawan	11 May 2014
4	Ram Kapoor	18 May 2014
5	Drashti Dhami	25 May 2014
6	Karan Johar	1 June 2014
7	Salman Khan	8 June 2014
8	Ronit Roy	15 June 2014
9	Harbhajan Singh	22 June 2014
10	Siddharth Malhotra	29 June 2014
11	Vidya Balan	17 January 2016
12	Akshay Kumar	24 January 2016
13	Jimmy Shergill	31 January 2016
14	Sania Mirza	7 February 2016
15	Manish Paul	14 February 2016
16	Parineeti Chopra	21 February 2016
17	Sonu Nigam	28 February 2016
18	Sonakshi Sinha	6 March 2016
19	Arjun Kapoor	13 March 2016
20	Alia Bhatt	20 March 2016
