= Pardes Mein Hai Mera Dil =

2016–2017 Indian television series

- Genre: Soap opera
- Developed by: Ekta Kapoor
- Written by: Ritu Bhatia; Aayush Agrawal
- Directed by: Mujammil Desai; Neeraj Baliyan; Imran; Onir
- Creative director: Sandiip Sickand
- Starring: Arjun Bijlani; Drashti Dhami
- Composer: Pamela Jain
- Country of origin: India
- Original language: Hindi
- No. of seasons: 1
- No. of episodes: 170

Production
- Executive producer: Aayush Agrawal
- Producers: Ekta Kapoor; Shobha Kapoor
- Production locations: Austria; Mumbai
- Cinematography: Ravi Mishra
- Editors: Vikas Sharma; Vishal Sharma
- Camera setup: Multi-camera
- Running time: 22 minutes
- Production company: Balaji Telefilms

Original release
- Network: Star Plus
- Release: 7 November 2016 – 30 June 2017

Pardes Mein Hai Mera Dil (transl. My Heart Is in a Foreign Land) (International title: Chasing My Heart) is an Indian television series produced by Ekta Kapoor under her banner Balaji Telefilms for Star Plus. The story, set in Austria, is inspired by the 1997 film Pardes and Manju Kapur's 2008 novel The Immigrant. It was shot in locations in India, Vienna and Innsbruck. The series starred Drashti Dhami, Arjun Bijlani and Vineet Raina. It went off air on 30 June 2017 with 170 episodes. It was replaced by Iss Pyaar Ko Kya Naam Doon 3.

== Plot ==
Set in Austria, Raghav Mehra works in his rich Indian family. He was adopted by Mehra family but only Indumati (dadi) loves him. He loves the spoilt Sanjana who ignores him. Sanjana is his Aunt Parmeshwari's niece. Parmeshwari wants to marry Sanjana to Veer to get hold of business. Naina Batra, a woman close to her family breaks up with her fiancé Amit due to her heart patient mother Asha's illness and leaves to Austria for the operation.

Naina and Raghav become friends. Raghav's grandmother Indumati fixes Naina's marriage with his cousin Veer. On the wedding day, Veer leaves, after which Raghav sacrifices his love and marries Naina who feels betrayed but soon trusts him.

Sanjana is pregnant with Veer's child. Indumati allows Veer back in the family and announces his marriage with Sanjana. Veer feels jealous of Naina and Raghav. Indumati goes into a coma. Raghav starts a new business but he needs money for that. A buyer Rehaan Khanna enters. Naina meets his wife Ahana and agrees to become a surrogate mother. Naina gives that money to Raghav to start his business.

Due to a misunderstanding, Raghav thinks that Naina has an affair and carries someone else's baby.

Without justification, Raghav divorces Naina. Ahana meets with a car accident planned by Rehaan's stepmother Harjeet, and dies after telling Naina that the baby is in danger.

=== 6 months later ===
Raghav has now become a rich but arrogant businessman and buys Mehra mansion.

Naina now lives in India. She works in Raghav's company. Indumati wakes up from coma and mistakes Ahana's baby to be of Raghav and Naina. Indumati tells Raghav the reason for her coma. Raghav is infuriated and rushes to Veer and beats him and gets him arrested. Rehaan learns that Ahana hired a surrogate so he began searching her and also told about this to Harjeet who now wants to kill Ahana's baby.

Naina gives premature birth to a baby boy Ahaan. Naina and Raghav grow closer and confesses their love. Rehaan attacks Raghav thinking he had kidnapped the baby. Raghav presumably dies thinking Naina cheated on him and Rehaan is Ahaan's father.

Naina marries Rehaan to look after Ahaan, and acts to be possessed by Ahana's ghost. Naina reveals Harjeet's true intentions. She tells Indumati that her marriage with Rehaan is real. Harjeet is arrested and tries to shoot Naina but Rehaan sacrifices himself,

=== 7 years later ===
Naina, Ahaan and Indumati live happily. Naina works as a tuition teacher and points towards Raghav's photo when her students question about her love story. She tells them that Raghav is her life as he told her the meaning of love and she will be united with him in heaven.

== Cast ==
=== Main ===
- Drashti Dhami as Naina Batra Khurana (formerly Mehra): Asha's daughter; Rajeev's sister; Amit and Veer's ex-fiancée; Raghav's widow; Rehaan's second wife; Ahaan's surrogate and step-mother (2016–2017)
- Arjun Bijlani as Raghav Mehra: Swaraj's son; Sanjana's ex-lover; Naina's late husband (2016–2017) (Dead)
- Vineet Raina as Rehaan Khurana: Harjeet's step-son; Armaan's half-brother; Ahana's widower; Naina's second husband; Ahaan's father (2017)

=== Recurring ===
- Surekha Sikri as Indumati Mehra: Matriach of the Mehra family; Madan, Swaraj and Balraj's mother; Veer, Akash, Shaurya, Ira and Raghav's grandmother; Veera, Ishaan, Aman, Prayag and Imraan's great-grandmother (2016–2017)
- Alka Amin as Asha Batra: Rajeev and Naina's mother; Ayaan, Ishaan and Neil's grandmother; Ahaan's step-grandmother (2016–2017)
- Adaa Khan as Ahana Khurana: Rehaan's late wife; Ahaan's mother (2017) (Dead)
- Sudha Chandran as Harjeet Khurana: Armaan's mother; Rehaan's step-mother; Imraan's grandmother; Ahaan, Ishaan and Neil's step-grandmother (2017)
- Alok Narula as Rajeev Batra: Asha's son; Naina's elder brother; Chanchal's husband; Ayaan's father (2016–2017)
- Unknown as Ayaan Batra: Rajeev and Chanchal's son (2016–2017)
- Sangeeta Kapure as Chanchal Batra: Rajeev's wife; Ayaan's mother (2016–2017)
- Rakesh Kukreti as Madan Mehra: Indumati's son; Swaraj and Balraj's brother; Sudha's husband; Veer and Akash's father; Veera and Aman's grandfather (2016–2017)
- Manini Mishra as Sudha Mehra: Madan's wife; Veer and Akash's mother; Veera and Aman's grandmother (2016–2017)
- Laksh Lalwani as Veer Mehra: Madan and Sudha's son; Akash's brother; Naina's ex-fiancé; Sanjana's husband; Veera's father (2016–2017) (Dead)
- Additi Gupta as Sanjana Mehra: Raghav's ex-lover; Veer's wife; Veera's mother (2016–2017)
- Gauri Singh as Seema (2017)
- Unknown as Veera Mehra: Veer and Sanjana's daughter (2017)
- Lovekesh Solanki as Akash Mehra: Madan and Sudha's son; Veer's brother; Soumya's husband; Aman's father (2016–2017)
- Unknown as Soumya Mehra: Akash's wife; Aman's mother (2017)
- Unknown as Aman Mehra: Akash and Soumya's son (2017)
- Manish Khanna as Balraj Mehra: Indumati's son; Swaraj and Madan's brother; Parmeshwari's husband; Shaurya and Ira's father; Prayag and Imraan's grandfather (2016–2017)
- Sonia Rakkar as Parmeshwari "Pam" Mehra: Balraj's wife; Shaurya and Ira's mother; Prayag and Imraan's grandmother (2016–2017)
- Ankit Shah as Sikandar "Shaurya" Mehra: Balraj and Parmeshwari's son; Ira's brother; Pragya's husband; Prayag's father (2016–2017)
- Unknown as Pragya Mehra: Shaurya's wife; Prayag's mother (2017)
- Unknown as Prayag Mehra: Shaurya and Pragya's son (2017)
- Rini Das as Iranjali "Ira" Mehra Khurana: Balraj and Parmeshwari's daughter; Shaurya's sister; Armaan's wife; Imraan's mother (2016–2017)
- Pulkit Bangia as Armaan Khurana: Harjeet's son; Rehaan's half-brother; Ira's husband; Imraan's father (2017)
- Parveen Kaur as Mrs. Vishwakarma: Amit's mother (2016)
- Vicky Arora as Amit Vishwakarma: Naina's ex-fiancé; Bella's boyfriend (2016)
- Lucinda Nicholas as Bella D'Costa: Amit's girlfriend (2016)
